= 42nd David di Donatello =

1997 Italian film awards

- Date: 20 April 1997
- Site: Teatro delle Vittorie, Rome
- Hosted by: Milly Carlucci

Highlights
- Best Picture: The Truce
- Most awards: The Truce (4)
- Most nominations: Nirvana (12)

Television coverage
- Network: Rai 1

The 42th David di Donatello ceremony, presented by the Accademia del Cinema Italiano, was held on 20 April 1997.

== Winners and nominees ==
Best Film: The Truce, directed by Francesco Rosi; The Cyclone, directed by Leonardo Pieraccioni; Marianna Ucrìa, directed by Roberto Faenza; My Generation, directed by Wilma Labate; Nirvana, directed by Gabriele Salvatores	Best Producer: Leo Pescarolo, Guido de Laurentiis – The Truce; Vittorio Cecchi Gori, Rita Rusić, Maurizio Totti – Nirvana; Giovanni Di Clemente – The Game Bag; Laurentina Guidotti, Francesco Ranieri Martinotti – Growing Artichokes in Mimongo; Pietro Valsecchi – An Eyewitness Account
Best Director: Francesco Rosi – The Truce; Roberto Faenza – Marianna Ucrìa; Wilma Labate – My Generation; Gabriele Salvatores – Nirvana; Maurizio Zaccaro – The Game Bag	Best New Director: Fulvio Ottaviano – Growing Artichokes in Mimongo; Franco Bernini – The Grey Zone; Ugo Chiti – Albergo Roma; Roberto Cimpanelli – A Cold, Cold Winter; Anna Di Francisca – La bruttina stagionata
Best Actor: Fabrizio Bentivoglio – An Eyewitness Account; Claudio Amendola – My Generation; Leonardo Pieraccioni – The Cyclone; Sergio Rubini – Nirvana; Carlo Verdone – I'm Crazy About Iris Blond	Best Actress: Asia Argento – Traveling Companion; Margherita Buy – An Eyewitness Account; Iaia Forte – Luna e l'altra; Claudia Gerini – I'm Crazy About Iris Blond; Monica Guerritore – La lupa
Best Supporting Actor: Leo Gullotta – The Game Bag; Diego Abatantuono – Nirvana; Antonio Albanese – Vesna Goes Fast; Claudio Amendola – An Eyewitness Account; Massimo Ceccherini – The Cyclone	Best Supporting Actress: Barbara Enrichi – The Cyclone; Edi Angelillo – La bruttina stagionata; Andréa Ferréol – I'm Crazy About Iris Blond; Eva Grieco – Marianna Ucrìa; Lorenza Indovina – The Truce
David di Donatello for Best Screenplay: Fabio Carpi – Homer: Portrait of the Artist as an Old Man; Marco Bechis, Umberto Cantarello, Lara Fremder, Gigi Riva, Maurizio Zaccaro – The Game Bag; Pino Cacucci, Gloria Corica, Gabriele Salvatores – Nirvana; Sandro Petraglia, Francesco Rosi, Stefano Rulli – The Truce; Leonardo Pieraccioni, Giovanni Veronesi – The Cyclone	Best Cinematography: Tonino Delli Colli – Marianna Ucrìa; Pasqualino De Santis, Marco Pontecorvo – The Truce; Blasco Giurato – The Game Bag; Giuseppe Lanci – The Prince of Homburg; Italo Petriccione – Nirvana
Best Production Design: Danilo Donati – Marianna Ucrìa; Giancarlo Basili – Nirvana; Giantito Burchiellaro – The Prince of Homburg; Andrea Crisanti – The Truce; Gianni Sbarra – The Elective Affinities	Best Score: Paolo Conte – How the Toys Saved Christmas; Luis Bacalov – The Truce; Carlo Crivelli – The Prince of Homburg; Federico De Robertis, Mauro Pagani – Nirvana; Nicola Piovani – My Generation
Best Editing: Ruggero Mastroianni, Bruno Sarandrea – The Truce; Francesca Calvelli – The Prince of Homburg; Massimo Fiocchi – Nirvana; Mirco Garrone – The Cyclone; Roberto Perpignani – Marianna Ucrìa	Best Sound: Tullio Morganti – Nirvana; Maurizio Argentieri – The Prince of Homburg; Gaetano Carito – A Cold, Cold Winter; Tiziano Crotti – Sacred Silence; Bruno Pupparo – My Generation
Best Costumes: Danilo Donati – Marianna Ucrìa; Patrizia Chericoni, Florence Emir – Nirvana; Lina Nerli Taviani – The Elective Affinities; Francesca Sartori – The Prince of Homburg; Alberto Verso – The Truce	Best Short Film: Senza parole, directed by Antonello De Leo
Best Foreign Film: Ridicule, directed by Patrice Leconte; David Scuola: The Cyclone, directed by Leonardo Pieraccioni	Special David Awards: Marcello Mastroianni; Claudia Cardinale
