= List of Italian films of 1995 =

A list of films produced in Italy in 1995 (see 1995 in film):

Title	Director	Cast	Genre	Notes
1995
Banditi	Stefano Mignucci	Ben Gazzara, Marco Leonardi	crime-drama	
Beyond the Clouds (Al di là delle nuvole)	Michelangelo Antonioni, Wim Wenders	John Malkovich, Sophie Marceau, Fanny Ardant	drama	last film of Antonioni
I Buchi neri	Pappi Corsicato	Iaia Forte, Vincenzo Peluso, Manuela Arcuri	comedy drama	
Camerieri	Leone Pompucci	Paolo Villaggio, Diego Abatantuono, Marco Messeri	comedy drama	
Colpo di luna	Alberto Simone	Tchéky Karyo, Nino Manfredi, Isabelle Pasco	comedy drama	Entered into the 45th Berlin International Film Festival
Croce e delizia	Luciano De Crescenzo	Marina Confalone, Teo Teocoli	comedy	
Cuore cattivo	Umberto Marino	Kim Rossi Stuart, Massimo Ghini	crime-drama	
Un eroe borghese	Michele Placido	Fabrizio Bentivoglio, Michele Placido, Omero Antonutti	crime-drama	
Facciamo paradiso	Mario Monicelli	Margherita Buy, Lello Arena, Philippe Noiret	comedy drama	
Ferie d'agosto	Paolo Virzì	Silvio Orlando, Laura Morante, Ennio Fantastichini	comedy drama	1996 David di Donatello Best Film winner
Fermo posta Tinto Brass	Tinto Brass	Cinzia Roccaforte	erotic	
The Horseman on the Roof	Jean-Paul Rappeneau	Juliette Binoche, Olivier Martinez	drama	French-Italian co-production
Io e il re	Lucio Gaudino	Franco Nero, Laura Morante, Carlo Delle Piane	comedy-drama	
Io no spik inglish	Carlo Vanzina	Paolo Villaggio, Paola Quattrini	comedy	
Ivo il tardivo	Alessandro Benvenuti	Alessandro Benvenuti, Francesca Neri	comedy-drama	
Love Story with Cramps	Pino Quartullo	Pino Quartullo, Chiara Caselli, Sergio Rubini, Debora Caprioglio	comedy	
Il mago	Ezio Pascucci	Anthony Quinn	comedy	
Men Men Men	Christian De Sica	Christian De Sica, Massimo Ghini, Leo Gullotta	comedy drama	
Nasty Love (L'amore molesto)	Mario Martone	Anna Bonaiuto, Angela Luce	Drama	3 David di Donatello, 1 Nastro d'Argento and entered at Cannes
Nemici d'infanzia	Luigi Magni	Renato Carpentieri	comedy drama	
Palermo-Milan One Way	Claudio Fragasso	Raoul Bova, Giancarlo Giannini, Stefania Sandrelli	crime-action	
Palla di neve	Claudio Fragasso	Paolo Villaggio, Alessandro Haber, Monica Bellucci	family-adventure	
Pasolini, un delitto italiano	Marco Tullio Giordana	Giulio Scarpati, Nicoletta Braschi, Claudio Amendola	crime-drama	entered the 52nd Venice International Film Festival
Poliziotti	Giulio Base	Claudio Amendola, Kim Rossi Stuart, Michele Placido	crime	
Romanzo di un giovane povero	Ettore Scola	Alberto Sordi, Isabella Ferrari	drama	entered the 52nd Venice International Film Festival
La Scuola	Daniele Luchetti	Silvio Orlando, Fabrizio Bentivoglio, Anna Galiena	comedy drama	1995 David di Donatello Best Film winner
The Second Time (La seconda volta)	Mimmo Calopresti	Nanni Moretti, Valeria Bruni Tedeschi, Marina Confalone	Drama	2 David di Donatello, entered into the 1996 Cannes Film Festival
Selvaggi	Carlo Vanzina	Ezio Greggio, Emilio Solfrizzi, Leo Gullotta		
Sons of Trinity	Enzo Barboni	Keith Neubert	Spaghetti Western	
The Star Maker (L'uomo delle stelle)	Giuseppe Tornatore	Sergio Castellitto, Tiziana Lodato, Leo Gullotta	Drama	Academy Awardnominee. 3 David di Donatello. 5 Nastro d'Argento
State Secret	Giuseppe Ferrara	Massimo Ghini, Massimo Dapporto	thriller	Entered into the 19th Moscow International Film Festival
Vacanze di Natale '95	Neri Parenti	Massimo Boldi, Christian De Sica, Luke Perry	comedy	
Viaggi di nozze	Carlo Verdone	Carlo Verdone, Claudia Gerini	comedy	
Lo Zio di Brooklyn	Daniele Ciprì, Franco Maresco	Salvatore Gattuso	Grotesque comedy	

== See also ==
- 1995 in Italian television
