= Nastro d'Argento for Best Supporting Actress =

Italian film award

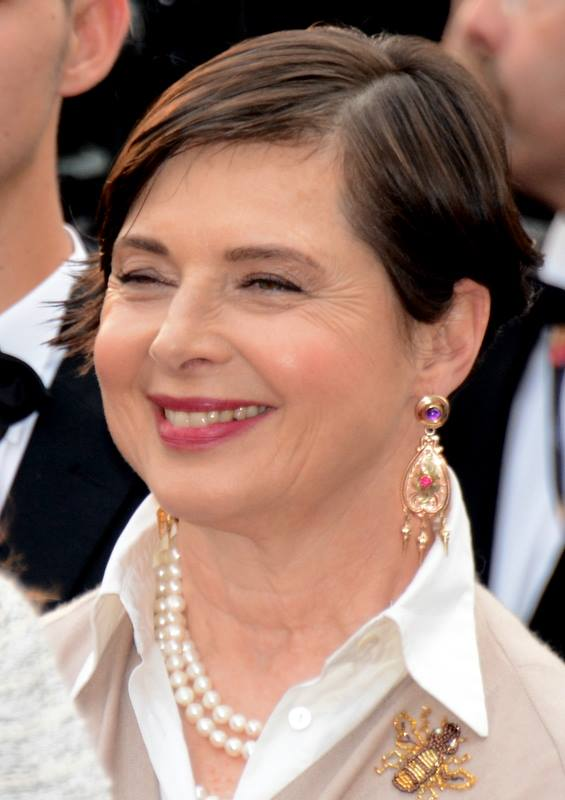
Isabella Rossellini at the Cannes Film Festival, 2015

The Nastro d'Argento (Silver Ribbon) is a film award presented annually since 1946 by the Sindacato Nazionale dei Giornalisti Cinematografici Italiani ("Italian National Syndicate of Film Journalists"), the association of Italian film critics.

This is the list of Nastro d'Argento awards for Best Supporting Actress. Virna Lisi and Stefania Sandrelli are the most awarded actresses in this category, with 4 awards each.

== 1940s ==
- 1946 – Anna Magnani – Rome, Open City
- 1947 – Ave Ninchi – To Live in Peace
- 1948 – Vivi Gioi – Tragic Hunt
- 1949 – Giulietta Masina – Without Pity

== 1950s ==
- 1950 – not awarded
- 1951 – Giulietta Masina – Variety Lights
- 1952 – not awarded
- 1953 – not awarded
- 1954 – not awarded
- 1955 – Tina Pica – Bread, Love and Jealousy
- 1956 – Valentina Cortese – Le amiche
- 1957 – Marisa Merlini – Time of Vacation
- 1958 – Franca Marzi – Nights of Cabiria
- 1959 – Dorian Gray – Mogli pericolose

== 1960s ==
- 1960 – Cristina Gajoni – ...And the Wild Wild Women
- 1961 – Didi Perego – Kapò
- 1962 – Monica Vitti – La notte
- 1963 – Regina Bianchi – The Four Days of Naples
- 1964 – Sandra Milo – 8½
- 1965 – Tecla Scarano – Marriage Italian-Style
- 1966 – Sandra Milo – Juliet of the Spirits
- 1967 – Olga Villi – The Birds, the Bees and the Italians
- 1968 – Maria Grazia Buccella – I Married You for Fun
- 1969 – Pupella Maggio – Be Sick... It's Free

== 1970s ==
- 1970 – not awarded
- 1971 – Francesca Romana Coluzzi – Venga a prendere il caffè da noi
- 1972 (shared)

– Marina Berti – Lady Caliph
– Silvana Mangano – Death in Venice

- 1973 – not awarded
- 1974 – Adriana Asti – A Brief Vacation
- 1975 – Giovanna Ralli – We All Loved Each Other So Much
- 1976 – Maria Teresa Albani – Down the Ancient Staircase
- 1977 – Adriana Asti – The Inheritance
- 1978 – Virna Lisi – Beyond Good and Evil
- 1979 – Lea Massari – Christ Stopped at Eboli

== 1980s ==
- 1980 – Stefania Sandrelli – La terrazza
- 1981 – Ida Di Benedetto – Fontamara
- 1982 – Claudia Cardinale – The Skin
- 1983 – Virna Lisi – Time for Loving
- 1984 – Monica Scattini – Away from where
- 1985 – Marina Confalone – Così parlò Bellavista
- 1986 – Isa Danieli – Camorra (A Story of Streets, Women and Crime)
- 1987 – Ottavia Piccolo – The Family
- 1988 – Elena Sofia Ricci – Me and My Sister
- 1989 – Stefania Sandrelli – Mignon Has Come to Stay

== 1990s ==
- 1990 – Nancy Brilli – Little Misunderstandings
- 1991 – Zoe Incrocci – Towards Evening
- 1992 – Ilaria Occhini – Welcome to Home Gori
- 1993 – Paola Quattrini – Brothers and Sisters
- 1994 – Milena Vukotic – Fantozzi in paradiso
- 1995 – Virna Lisi – La Reine Margot
- 1996 – Regina Bianchi – Camerieri
- 1997 – Lucia Poli – Albergo Roma
- 1998 – Mimma De Rosalia, Maria Aliotta, Annamaria Confalone, Adele Aliotta, Francesca Di Cesare, Eleonora Teriaca, Concetta Alfano, Antonia Uzzo – To Die for Tano
- 1999 – Stefania Sandrelli – La cena

== 2000s ==
- 2000 – Marina Massironi – Bread and Tulips
- 2001 – Stefania Sandrelli – The Last Kiss
- 2002 – Margherita Buy, Virna Lisi, Sandra Ceccarelli – The Best Day of My Life
- 2003 – Monica Bellucci – Remember Me, My Love
- 2004 – Margherita Buy – Caterina in the Big City
- 2005 – Giovanna Mezzogiorno – Love Returns
- 2006 – Angela Finocchiaro – The Beast in the Heart
- 2007 – Ambra Angiolini – Saturn in Opposition
- 2008 – Sabrina Ferilli – Your Whole Life Ahead of You
- 2009 – Francesca Neri – Giovanna's Father

== 2010s ==
- 2010 (shared)

– Isabella Ragonese – La nostra vita and Due vite per caso
– Elena Sofia Ricci, Lunetta Savino – Loose Cannons

- 2011 – Carolina Crescentini – Boris: The Film and 20 Cigarettes
- 2012 – Michela Cescon – Piazza Fontana: The Italian Conspiracy
- 2013 – Sabrina Ferilli – The Great Beauty
- 2014 – Paola Minaccioni – Fasten Your Seatbelts
- 2015 – Micaela Ramazzotti – An Italian Name
- 2016 – Greta Scarano – Suburra
- 2017 (shared)

– Sabrina Ferilli – Omicidio all'italiana
– Carla Signoris – Lasciati andare

- 2018 – Kasia Smutniak – Loro
- 2019 – Marina Confalone – The Vice of Hope

== 2020s ==
- 2020 – Valeria Golino – Portrait of a Lady on Fire and 5 Is the Perfect Number
- 2021 – Sara Serraiocco – Thou Shalt Not Hate
- 2022 – Luisa Ranieri – The Hand of God
- 2023 – Barbora Bobuľová - A Brighter Tomorrow
- 2024 – Isabella Rossellini - La chimera
- 2025 – Matilda De Angelis / Elodie – Fuori (tie)

== See also ==
- David di Donatello for Best Supporting Actress
- Cinema of Italy
