= Blasco Giurato =

Italian cinematographer (1941–2022)

- Born: 7 June 1941; Rome, Italy
- Died: 26 December 2022 (aged 81)
- Occupation: Cinematographer

Blasco Giurato (7 June 1941 – 26 December 2022) was an Italian cinematographer.

Born in Rome, Giurato was the brother of journalist Luca Giurato and of singer-songwriter Flavio Giurato. He was nominated to the BAFTA Award for Best Cinematography for Giuseppe Tornatore's Cinema Paradiso. In 1993, he won the Globo d'oro for the cinematography of Tornatore's A Pure Formality. In 1997, he was nominated for the David di Donatello for Best Cinematography for his work in Maurizio Zaccaro's The Game Bag.

== Selected filmography ==
- La Orca (1976)
- Oedipus Orca (1976)
- A Spiral of Mist (1977)
- Escape from the Bronx (1983)
- Sapore di mare 2 - Un anno dopo (1983)
- The Professor (1986)
- Teresa (1987)
- Cinema Paradiso (1988)
- Sinbad of the Seven Seas (1989)
- Time to Kill (1989)
- I'll Be Going Now (1990)
- Everybody's Fine (1990)
- Year of the Gun (1991)
- Amami (1993)
- A Pure Formality (1993)
- Tentazioni Metropolitane (1993)
- Belle al Bar (1994)
- Ivo the Genius (1995)
- Sostiene Pereira (1995)
- The Blue Collar Worker and the Hairdresser in a Whirl of Sex and Politics (1996)
- Albergo Roma (1996)
- The Game Bag (1997)
- Of Lost Love (1998)
- Ferdinando and Carolina (1999)
- Viper (2000)
- Vajont (2001)
- Two Friends (2002)
- Five Moons Square (2003)
- A Golden Boy (2014)
- Abe (2020)
