= It Was a Dark and Stormy Night (film) =

1985 film

- Directed by: Alessandro Benvenuti
- Written by: Alessandro Benvenuti
- Produced by: Alfredo Nicolai
- Starring: Alessandro Benvenuti; Athina Cenci; Daniele Trambusti
- Cinematography: Cristiano Pogany
- Edited by: Franco Fraticelli
- Music by: Patrizio Fariselli
- Distributed by: Istituto Luce
- Release date: September 5, 1985
- Running time: 106 minutes
- Country: Italy
- Language: Italian

It Was a Dark and Stormy Night (Italian: Era una notte buia e tempestosa...) is a 1985 Italian comedy film directed by Alessandro Benvenuti.

== Cast ==
- Alessandro Benvenuti as Felix
- Athina Cenci as Valentina
- Daniele Trambusti as Riccardino
- Maria Rosaria Omaggio as Lilian
- Giovanni Chinnici Botta as Amedeo
- Clara Colosimo as Fernanda
- Maurizio Dami as Billicioni
- Michelangelo Lo Prete as the Boss
