= My Dearest Friends =

1998 Italian thriller-comedy

- Directed by: Alessandro Benvenuti
- Written by: Alessandro Benvenuti; Alberto Ongaro
- Produced by: Vittorio Cecchi Gori; Rita Rusić
- Starring: Alessandro Benvenuti; Athina Cenci; Eva Robin's; Alessandro Gassmann; Gianmarco Tognazzi; Andrea Brambilla; Nino Formicola; Vito
- Cinematography: Maurizio Calvesi
- Edited by: Carla Simoncelli
- Music by: Patrizio Fariselli
- Release date: April 3, 1998
- Running time: 113 minutes
- Country: Italy
- Language: Italian

My Dearest Friends (Italian: I miei più cari amici) is a 1998 Italian thriller-comedy film directed by Alessandro Benvenuti.

== Cast ==
- Alessandro Benvenuti as Alessio
- Athina Cenci as Martha
- Eva Robin's as Loretta
- Alessandro Gassmann as Rossano
- Gianmarco Tognazzi as Tommasi
- Andrea Brambilla as Bric
- Nino Formicola as Brac
- Vito as Oscar
- Marco Messeri as Ascanio
- Umberto Smaila as Nemo
- Flavio Bucci as the botanist
- Cristina Moglia as Alda
- Roberto Ciufoli as Luca
- Alessandro Lombardi as the butler
