= Return to Home Gori =

- Original title: Ritorno a casa Gori
- Directed by: Alessandro Benvenuti
- Written by: Alessandro Benvenuti; Ugo Chiti; Francesca Marciano
- Starring: Alessandro Benvenuti; Sabrina Ferilli; Athina Cenci; Alessandro Haber
- Cinematography: Danilo Desideri
- Edited by: Carla Simoncelli
- Music by: Patrizio Fariselli
- Release date: 1996
- Running time: 82 minutes
- Country: Italy
- Language: Italian

Return to Home Gori (Italian: Ritorno a casa Gori) is a 1996 comedy film directed by Alessandro Benvenuti. It is the sequel of Welcome to Home Gori.

== Plot ==
After 5 years from the fateful day of Christmas at Welcome to Home Gori, the scenery changes during a robbery in a villa in Tuscany by Danilo (Massimo Ceccherini) and his friends addicts (one of whom is played by Alessandro Paci). Back home, he expect a sad circumstance, the death of his mother Adele (Ilaria Occhini). In fear of theft Danilo hiding the loot in the coffin of his mother exposed in the red room in the house for the wake.

== Cast ==
- Alessandro Benvenuti as Luciano
- Massimo Ceccherini as Danilo Gori
- Ilaria Occhini as Adele Papini
- Carlo Monni as Gino Gori
- Novello Novelli as Annibale Papini
- Athina Cenci as Bruna Papini
- Alessandro Haber as Libero Salvini
- Sabrina Ferilli as Sandra Salvini Sottili
- Barbara Enrichi as Cinzia Enrichi
