= Welcome to Home Gori =

- Italian: Benvenuti in casa Gori
- Directed by: Alessandro Benvenuti
- Written by: Alessandro Benvenuti; Ugo Chiti
- Produced by: Francesco Nuti
- Starring: Athina Cenci; Ilaria Occhini; Carlo Monni; Novello Novelli; Alessandro Benvenuti
- Cinematography: Gianlorenzo Battaglia
- Edited by: Sergio Montanari
- Music by: Patrizio Fariselli
- Release date: 1990
- Running time: 96 minutes
- Country: Italy
- Language: Italian

Welcome to Home Gori (Italian: Benvenuti in casa Gori) is a 1990 comedy-drama film directed by Alessandro Benvenuti.

It is based on a comedy play with the same name by Ugo Chiti and the same Benvenuti. For her performance Ilaria Occhini was awarded with a Nastro d'Argento for Best Supporting Actress. The film has a sequel, Return to Home Gori.

== Plot ==
The film is set in a house in a Tuscan landscape, has an ironic content and a Christmas frame. The film is divided into 5 episodes: The Family, The Lunch, Unexpected Pregnancy, The Videotape and Epilogue.

== Cast ==
- Athina Cenci as Bruna Papini
- Ilaria Occhini as Adele Papini
- Carlo Monni as Gino Gori
- Novello Novelli as Annibale Papini
- Alessandro Benvenuti as Lapo Frittelli
- Massimo Ceccherini as Danilo Gori
- Barbara Enrichi as Cinzia
- Ornella Marini as Serena Salvini
- Giorgio Picchianti as Libero Salvini
- Camilla Benvenuti as Samantha Frittelli
