= Love Story with Cramps =

- Directed by: Pino Quartullo
- Written by: Pino Quartullo; Claudio Masenza; Graziano Diana
- Produced by: Vittorio Cecchi Gori; Rita Rusic
- Starring: Pino Quartullo; Chiara Caselli
- Cinematography: Maurizio Calvesi
- Music by: Tony Esposito
- Release date: 1995
- Country: Italy
- Language: Italian

Love Story with Cramps (Italian: Storie d'amore con i crampi) is a 1995 Italian romantic comedy film written and directed by Pino Quartullo.

== Cast ==
- Pino Quartullo as Francesco
- Chiara Caselli as Marcella/Amanda
- Sergio Rubini as Roberto
- Debora Caprioglio as Alessia
- Rossella Falk as Agency Director
- Antonio Allocca as Pension Owner

== See also ==
- List of Italian films of 1995
