= Eva Robin's =

Italian actress (born 1958)

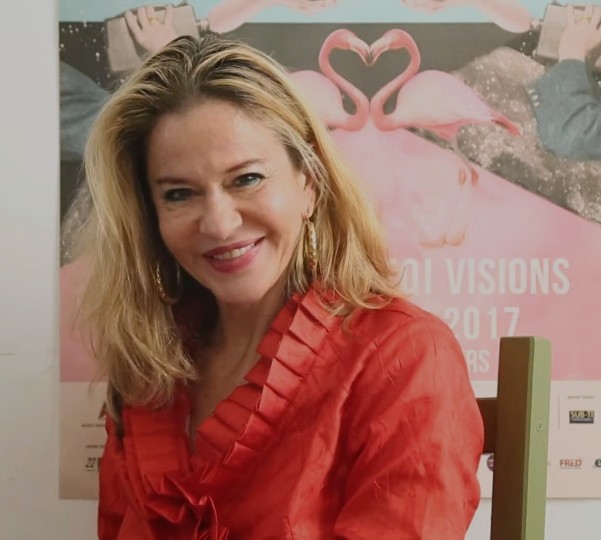
- Born: 10 December 1958 (age 67); Bologna, Italy
- Other names: Cassandra; Eva Robins; Eva Coatti
- Occupations: Actress, model
- Years active: 1979–present
- Height: 1.67 m (5 ft 6 in)

Eva Robin's (born 10 December 1958) is an Italian actress, model, and activist. She is best known for her role in Dario Argento's 1982 horror film Tenebrae.

Eva was born male, but from the age of about thirteen, she says she felt she was female. When she was sixteen, she met a neighbor who was transgender and who introduced her to feminizing hormones. By the age of twenty-one, she was living as a transgender woman. Eva says she does not want sex reassignment surgery, saying she feels comfortable with her body and has no desire to change.

Contrary to conflicting mentions, Eva currently does spell her last name with an apostrophe in it. She took her nom de plume from a character in Italy's Diabolik comics, Eva Kant, and writer Harold Robbins. While on holiday in Sardinia, she saw the name "Robbins" spelled as "Robin's" and decided to take on that particular spelling.

The friendship with Paolo Villaggio gave her the opportunity to meet Marta Marzotto, Bianca Jagger, Christian Bulgari, and industrialists such as Barilla.

== Filmography ==
=== Films ===
Year	Title	Role	Notes
1979	La cerimonia dei sensi	Eva	
1980	Eva Man (Due sessi in uno)	Eva Man	
1982	Tenebrae	Girl on beach	Uncredited
1982	El regreso de Eva Man	Eva Man	
1983	Hercules	Daedalus	
1985	The Adventures of Hercules	Daedalus	
1987	Mascara	Pepper	
1989	Massacre Play	Rosita	
1990	Fantasmi a Napoli	Secretary	
1994	Belle al Bar	Giulia	
1996	Luna e l'altra	Bearded woman	Cameo
1998	My Dearest Friends	Loretta	
2002	L'auto del silenzio	The Woman	Short
2003	Cattive inclinazioni	Nicole Cardente	
2007	Il segreto di Rahil	Mother Superior	
2007	Women of My Life	Chocolate seller	Cameo
2007	All'amore assente	Taxi driver	Cameo
2013	Una notte agli studios	Mrs. Blair	
2018	Tu mi nascondi qualcosa	Pamela	
2021	La discoteca	Sylvester	Short

=== Television ===
Year	Title	Role	Notes
1989	Valentina	Madame	Episode: "Ciao Valentina"
1991	Odyssey	Mermaid	Television film
2002	Il bello delle donne	Pola	2 episodes
2007	Di che peccato sei	Manuela	Television film
