= A Respectable Man =

1999 Italian drama film

- Directed by: Maurizio Zaccaro
- Starring: Michele Placido; Stefano Accorsi; Mariangela Melato; Giovanna Mezzogiorno; Leo Gullotta; Giuliano Gemma; Vincenzo Peluso; Franco Castellano; Mariano Rigillo; Pino Ammendola; Luigi Diberti; Franco Trevisi; Augusto Zucchi
- Cinematography: Pasquale Rachini
- Music by: Pino Donaggio
- Release date: 1999
- Language: Italian

A Respectable Man (Italian: Un uomo perbene) is a 1999 Italian drama film written and directed by Maurizio Zaccaro. It depicts the judicial case of television presenter Enzo Tortora, who was falsely accused by several pentiti to be a camorra man and who died of cancer a short time after being acquitted. For his performance Leo Gullotta won the David di Donatello for best supporting actor.

== Plot ==
On June 17, 1983, at 4:00 a.m., Enzo Tortora, a well-known television host, was arrested at the Hotel Plaza in Rome. The informant Giovanni Pandico had identified him as a member of the Nuova Camorra Organizzata and a cocaine courier for Raffaele Cutolo. The defense was handled by lawyers Della Valle, Dall'Ora, and Coppola. In the following months, Tortora faced confrontations with fellow informants Giovanni Melluso and Villa, who persisted with their accusations. On August 17, 1984, the Naples court issued an indictment for 640 defendants, including Tortora. The first-instance trial began on February 4, 1985, and concluded on September 17, 1986, with Tortora sentenced to ten years and seven months in prison. The appeal hearing began on May 20, 1986. On September 1st, attorney Della Valle delivered the defense's seven-hour oral argument. On September 15th, at 11:00 a.m., the court issued its verdict: Enzo Tortora was fully acquitted, a sentence upheld by the Supreme Court of Cassation on June 17, 1987.

== Cast ==
- Michele Placido: Enzo Tortora
- Stefano Accorsi: Lawyer Raffaele Della Valle
- Giovanna Mezzogiorno: Silvia Tortora
- Mariangela Melato: Anna Tortora
- Leo Gullotta: Giovanni Pandico
- Luigi Diberti: Public Prosecutor
- Pino Ammendola: Lawyer Antonio Coppola
- Giuliano Gemma: Lawyer Alberto Dall'Ora
- Vincenzo Peluso: Gianni Melluso
- Mariano Rigillo: Judge Antonio Fontana
