= Cain vs. Cain =

- Directed by: Alessandro Benvenuti
- Written by: Alessandro Benvenuti; Leo Benvenuti; Piero De Bernardi; Ugo Chiti
- Produced by: Mario Cecchi Gori; Vittorio Cecchi Gori
- Starring: Enrico Montesano; Alessandro Benvenuti
- Cinematography: Cristiano Pogany
- Edited by: Sergio Montanari
- Music by: Patrizio Fariselli
- Distributed by: Variety Distribution
- Release date: 1993
- Running time: 102 minutes
- Country: Italy
- Language: Italian

Cain vs. Cain (Italian: Caino e Caino) is a 1993 Italian comedy film directed by Alessandro Benvenuti.

== Cast ==
- Enrico Montesano as Fabio Casamei
- Alessandro Benvenuti as Franco Casamei
- Daniela Poggi as Viviana
- Cristiana Casini as Giada
- Alessio De Lelli as Daniele
- Bruno Vetti as Attilio
- Gisella Sofio as Giuliana
- Novello Novelli as Aureliano Casamei
- Wanda Pasquini as Adelina
- Ines Nobili as Irene
- Emy Kay as Katerina
- Evelina Gori as Luisa
- Anna Maria Torniai as Adua
- Giuliano Ghiselli as Adelmo
- Sandro Ghiani as the Brigadier
