= 1995 in Italian television =

This is a list of Italian television related events from 1995.

== Events ==
- 23 February. During the Sanremo Festival, the unemployed Pino Pagano threatens, on air, to jump from a dais of the Ariston theatre. The presenter Pippo Baudo eventually manages to get him down, among the applauses of the public. Later, Pagano will admit to have staged the suicide, hoping to get some notoriety. The contest is won by Giorgia, with Come saprei.

== Debuts ==
=== Rai ===
==== Variety ====
- Carramba che sorpresa! – with Raffaella Carrà; 8 seasons. An Italian version of the British Surprise, surprise, Carramba che sorpresa! is a mix of variety and reality show, with ordinary people who are surprised by meetings with lost relatives or their favorite celebrities. The success of the show has led to the coinage of the Italian word “carrambata”, meaning an unexpected encounter.

==== Serial ====
- Pazza famiglia (Crazy family) – with Enrico Montesano (also director), Alessandra Casella and Paolo Panelli; 2 seasons. The family troubles of an aged architect, forced to face his second divorce, are told in humorous key.

==== News and educational ====
- Le Alpi di Messner (Reinhold Messner’s Alps) – by Carlo Alberto Pinelli; 2 seasons.

=== Fininvest ===
==== Variety ====
- Colpo di fulmine (Love at first sight) – reality show, hosted by Alessia Marcuzzi, Michelle Hunziker and Walter Nudo, Italian version of the American Street match; four seasons. The host tries to match a boy and a girl chosen by chance in the streets of a town.

=== International ===
- 3 July - (France) / (Canada) / (United States) The Busy World of Richard Scarry (Rai 1) (1994-1997)
- 1 October - (United States) Skeleton Warriors (Italia 1) (1995)
- 10 October - (United States) Gravedale High (Italia 1) (1990)
- 24 December - (United Kingdom) Noddy's Toyland Adventures (Italia 1) (1992-1994, 1999)
- (United States) / (Canada) Fievel's American Tails (TELE+1) (1992)
- (United States) / (Canada) Eek! The Cat (Italia 1) (1992-1997)
- (Australia) The Adventures of Blinky Bill (Junior TV) (1994)

== Television shows ==
=== RAI ===
==== Drama ====
- Moses – by Roger Young, with Ben Kingsley in the title role, Frank Langella (Merneptha) and Christopher Lee (Ramses II.); fifth chapter of the LuX Vide's Bible project.
- La rossa del Roxy Bar (The Roxy bar’s red woman) – comedy with Tullio Solenghi and Anna Marchesini (also directors); 2 episodes. Two bored spouses become, under fake identities, lovers of each other.

==== Miniseries ====
- La piovra 7 – Indagine sulla morte del commisario Cattani (Enquiry about superintendent Cattani’s killing) – by Luigi Perelli, with Raoul Bova (the third hero of the franchise, the vice-superintendent Gianni Breda), Patricia Millardet and Ennio Fantastichini (the new villain, Saverio Bronta), 6 episodes.
- Voci notturne (Night voices) – esoteric thrillerset in Rome; by Fabrizio Laurenti, written by Pupi Avati, with Massimo Bonetti, Lorenzo Falherty and Jason Robards III; 6 episodes. The series attempts to emulate the Il segno del comando's formula, but gets low ratings when it’s aired; only later, it becomes a cult object for the amateurs of the genre.

=== Fininvest ===
==== Variety ====
- Generazione X (Generation X) – talk show about the problems of the youth, hosted by Ambra Angiolini, who here gives up the frivolous image of her beginning.
- Re per una notte (1994-1996)

== Deaths ==
Date	Name	Age	Cinematic Credibility
6 February	Edy Campagnoli	60	Italian TV personality & actress
13 November	Adriana Serra	71	Italian film actress

== See also ==
- List of Italian films of 1995
