= Regina Bianchi =

Italian actress (1921–2013)

Regina Bianchi (1 January 1921 – 5 April 2013) was an Italian stage and film actress.

== Life and career ==
Born in Lecce as Regina D'Antigny, she was the daughter of two theatre actors. Forced by the fascist phobia of foreign cultures to change her surname, she adopted the surname of her paternal grandmother.

At age 16, she entered the stage company of Raffaele Viviani and, that year, debuted in the comedy play Campagna napoletana, in the leading role of Reginella. In 1939, she starred in the drama film Il ponte di vetro; on the film set she became engaged to the director Goffredo Alessandrini, who remained her partner for over 20 years.

After having announced her retirement in 1944, she came back in 1959 with the title role in Eduardo De Filippo's Filumena Marturano. She won two Nastro d'Argento for Best Supporting Actress, in 1963 for Nanni Loy's The Four Days of Naples, and in 1996 for Leone Pompucci's Camerieri, and she appeared as Anna, the mother of Mary, in Franco Zeffirelli's television miniseries Jesus of Nazareth in 1977.

In 1996, she was awarded Grand Officer of the Italian Republic for artistic merits. She died at 92 in her home in Rome.

== Filmography ==
Year	Title	Role	Notes
1939	Rosa de Sangue		
1939	The Silent Partner		
1940	Bridge of Glass	Anna	
1940	Then We'll Get a Divorce	Margaret	
1942	I due Foscari	Lucrezia Contarini	
1961	The Last Judgment		
1961	A Day for Lionhearts	Moglie di Edoardo	
1962	His Days Are Numbered	Giulia	
1962	A Milanese Story	Madre di Valeria	
1962	The Four Days of Naples	Concetta Capuozzo	Uncredited
1966	Shoot Loud, Louder... I Don't Understand	Rosa Amitrano	
1966	Il nero		
1968	Operazione ricchezza		
1969	Temptation		
1977	Jesus of Nazareth	Anna	1 episode
1977	Dove volano i corvi d'argento	Istevene's mother	
1980	Zappatore	Maddalena Esposito	
1981	Carcerato	Donna Assunta	
1981	Celebrità	Rosa	
1982	Giuramento	Sua madre	
1983	Stangata napoletana	Palmira	
1984	Kaos	Madre di Pirandello	(segment "Colloquio con la madre")
1985	L'amara scienza		
1994	Law of Courage	Mrs. Livatino	
1994	The Teddy Bear	Nonna Claudia	
1995	Camerieri	Salvatore Azzaro's Wife	
1999	Il manoscritto di Van Hecken		
1999	Not registered	Tonia	
2001	E adesso sesso	Nonna Assunta	
2002	Sotto gli occhi di tutti	Tonia	
2008	Ci sta un francese, un inglese e un napoletano	Madre Noemi	(final film role)
