= Ivo the Genius =

- Theatrical release poster
- Directed by: Alessandro Benvenuti
- Written by: Alessandro Benvenuti; Ugo Chiti; Nicola Zavagli
- Starring: Alessandro Benvenuti; Francesca Neri
- Cinematography: Blasco Giurato
- Music by: Patrizio Fariselli
- Production company: Union P.N.
- Distributed by: United International Pictures
- Release date: 1995
- Country: Italy
- Language: Italian

Ivo the Genius (Italian: Ivo il tardivo) is a 1995 Italian comedy drama film co-written, directed and starred by Alessandro Benvenuti.

== Plot ==
Ivo, a troubled forty-year old man, keen on solving puzzles has just recovered from a mental illness. He goes back to his hometown where he meets Sara, who wants to help him at all costs. He falls in love with her and in order to keep seeing her he agrees to go and live with four people with mental problems with whom he sets up a kind of misfits community.

== Cast ==
- Alessandro Benvenuti as Ivo
- Francesca Neri as Sara
- Davide Bechini as Fabio
- Francesco Casale as Andrea
- Vito as Silvano
- Antonino Iuorio as Antonio
- Sandro Lombardi as Aldo
- Luca Fagioli as Carlino
- Sonia Grassi as Delfina
- Daniele Trambusti as Lele
- Maria Pelikan as Bruna
- Lucia Ragni as Aunt Augusta
- Guido Cerniglia as Sara's father

== See also ==
- List of Italian films of 1995
