= Ugo Chiti =

Italian screenwriter and playwright (born 1943)

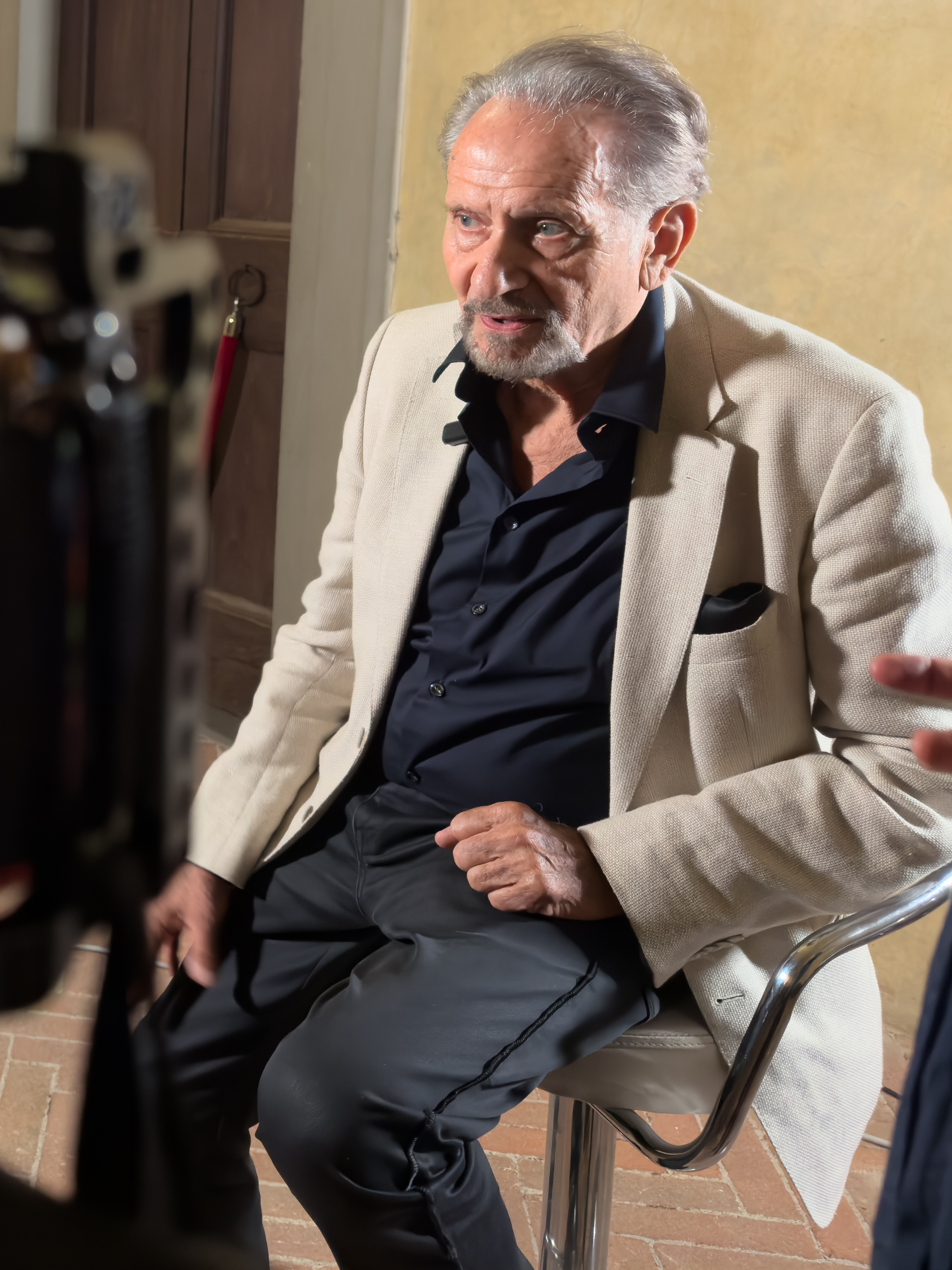
- Chiti in 2023
- Born: 13 February 1943 (age 83); Tavarnelle Val di Pesa, Italy
- Occupations: Screenwriter; Playwright

Ugo Chiti (born 13 February 1943) is an Italian screenwriter, playwright, stage and film director.

== Life and career ==
Born in Tavarnelle Val di Pesa, Chiti started his career in 1970 with Pier'Alli's Society for Theatre Research. He later founded Teatro in piazza ('Theater in the Square'), a stage company focused in folk and dialect theatre, and collaborated with Affratellamento Theater in Florence. In 1983, he founded the Arkhè theater and began a long collaboration with the Arca Azzurra stage company, of which he became the main dramatist. In theater, he is best known for the trilogy of dramas La terra e la memoria ('The land and the memory', 1987-1993), a portrait of 50 years of Italian history, of which he adapted the first chapter Allegretto into the film Albergo Roma in 1996.

After serving as costume and production designer in a few films, Chiti started his career as a screenwriter with Willy Signori e vengo da lontano by Francesco Nuti. In the following years, he became a close collaborator of Nuti, Alessandro Benvenuti and Giovanni Veronesi. Starting from 2003, he is a regular collaborator of Matteo Garrone.

During his career Chiti won numerous awards, notably six David di Donatello, two Silver Ribbons, a Globo d'oro and a European Film Award for Best Screenwriter.

== Selected filmography ==
- Willy Signori e vengo da lontano (1989)
- Welcome to Home Gori (1990)
- Women in Skirts (1991)
- The Party's Over (1991)
- Cain vs. Cain (1993)
- For Love, Only for Love (1993)
- Belle al Bar (1994)
- Ivo the Genius (1995)
- OcchioPinocchio (1995)
- Albergo Roma (1996, also director)
- The Barber of Rio (1996)
- Return to Home Gori (1996)
- Silenzio... si nasce (1996)
- The Second Wife (1998, also director)
- Io amo Andrea (1999)
- Caruso, Zero for Conduct (2001)
- The Embalmer (2002)
- Do You Mind If I Kiss Mommy? (2003)
- Manual of Love (2005)
- Manual of Love 2 (2006)
- Gomorrah (2008)
- Black Sea (2008)
- Italians (2009)
- La pecora nera (2010)
- Parents and Children: Shake Well Before Using (2010)
- The Ages of Love (2011)
- Reality (2012)
- The Fifth Wheel (2013)
- A Woman as a Friend (2014)
- Tale of Tales (2015)
- As Needed (2018)
- Dogman (2018)
- The Life Ahead (2020)
- Strangeness (2022)
- Mimì: Prince of Darkness (2023)
- The Illusion (2025)
