= Zuzzurro =

Italian actor and comedian

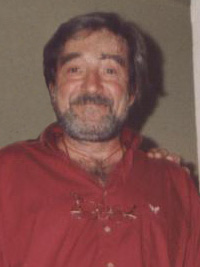
- Zuzzurro in April 2010.
- Born: Andrea Cipriano Brambilla; 21 August 1946; Varese, Italy
- Died: 24 October 2013 (aged 67); Milan, Italy
- Occupations: Actor, comedian
- Years active: 1976–2013

Andrea Cipriano Brambilla (21 August 1946 − 24 October 2013), better known as Zuzzurro, was an Italian actor and comedian.

Zuzzurro was born on 21 August 1946 in Varese. He was a former member of Zuzzurro e Gaspare with Nino Formicola (Gaspare).

In September 2013, it was reported Zuzzurro had lung cancer. He subsequently died of the illness on 24 October 2013, aged 67, in Milan.

== Filmography ==
Year	Title	Role	Notes
1980	La liceale al mare con l'amica di papà	Arcibaldo	
1981	L'esercito più pazzo del mondo	Soldier #1	
1994	Belle al Bar	Guido	
1998	My Dearest Friends		
1999	All the Moron's Men	Guinea pig	(final film role)
