= Black Sea (2008 film) =

2008 drama film

- Directed by: Federico Bondi
- Screenplay by: Ugo Chiti; Federico Bondi
- Starring: Ilaria Occhini; Dorotheea Petre; Corso Salani
- Cinematography: Gigi Martinucci
- Edited by: Ilaria Fraioli
- Music by: Enzo Casucci
- Release date: 2008
- Countries: Italy; Romania; France
- Language: Italian

Black Sea (Italian: Mar nero) is a 2008 drama film co-written and directed by Federico Bondi, in his directorial debut. A co-production between Italy, Romania and France, it premiered at the Locarno Film Festival, in which Ilaria Occhini was awarded best actress.

== Cast ==
- Ilaria Occhini as Gemma
- Dorotheea Petre as Angela
- Corso Salani as Enrico
- Vlad Ivanov as Adrian
- Maia Morgenstern as Madalina
- Theodor Danetti as Nicolae
