= Clara Colosimo =

Italian actress (1922–1994)

- Born: 23 May 1922; San Vendemiano, Treviso, Italy
- Died: 15 June 1994 (aged 72)
- Occupation: Actress
- Years active: 1968–1991

Clara Colosimo (23 May 1922 – 15 June 1994) was an Italian film actress. She appeared in 65 films between 1968 and 1991.

== Biography ==
Clara Colosimo was born in Conegliano in 1922. She studied opera as a mezzo-soprano in Trieste, where she grew up.

== Selected filmography ==
- Night of the Serpent (1969)
- Alfredo, Alfredo (1972)
- Sex Pot (1975)
- Il mostro (1977)
- Zanna Bianca e il grande Kid (1977)
- In the Highest of Skies (1977)
- Orchestra Rehearsal (1978)
- Dear Father (1979)
- Café Express (1980)
- The Lady of the Camellias (1981)
- Eccezzziunale... veramente (1982)
- Il ragazzo di campagna (1984)
- It Was a Dark and Stormy Night (1985)
- Italian Fast Food (1986)
