= West of Paperino =

- Directed by: Alessandro Benvenuti
- Written by: Alessandro Benvenuti
- Produced by: Gianfranco Piccioli
- Starring: Athina Cenci; Alessandro Benvenuti; Francesco Nuti
- Cinematography: Romano Albani
- Edited by: Sergio Montanari
- Music by: Alessandro Benvenuti; Stephen Head; Dado Parisini
- Release date: December 1981
- Running time: 91 minutes
- Country: Italy
- Language: Italian

West of Paperino (Italian: Ad ovest di Paperino) is a 1981 Italian comedy film directed by Alessandro Benvenuti.

It is the first film of the comedy trio "I GianCattivi", formed by Athina Cenci, Francesco Nuti and Benvenuti, who won the Nastro d'Argento for Best New Director. The film is set in Florence, Tuscany, with some scenes shot in Prato. The title is an inside joke that refers to the Tuscan village of Paperino, which is a district of Prato; the film's surreal and grotesque undertones are also hinted by the title itself, since "Paperino" is also the Italian name for Donald Duck.

== Cast ==
- Athina Cenci as Marta
- Alessandro Benvenuti as Sandro
- Francesco Nuti as Francesco Sabatini
- Paolo Hendel as Veleno
- Gianna Sammarco as Francesco's mother
- Novello Novelli as Francesco's father
- Renato Scarpa as Don Vincenzo
- Franco Javarone as Notturno
- Silvano Panichi as Wiliams
- Lucilla Baroni as Lucilla
- Franco Piacentini as Torchio
- Giovanni Nannini as Belvedere
- Paolo Pieri as Mario the barman
- Angelo Pellegrino as the employee of the employment office
- Giorgio Picchianti as the fisherman
