= Jackpot (1992 film) =

- Directed by: Mario Orfini
- Written by: Adriano Celentano; Mario Orfini; Grazia Giardiello
- Starring: Adriano Celentano; Kate Vernon; Totò Cascio; Christopher Lee; Carroll Baker
- Cinematography: Luciano Tovoli
- Edited by: Pietro Scalia
- Music by: Anthony Marinelli; Giorgio Moroder
- Release date: December 23, 1992
- Running time: 110 minutes
- Country: Italy
- Language: English - Italian
- Budget: 18 billion lire ($US 12.6 million)
- Box office: 158 million lire (US$110,000)

Jackpot (also known as Cyber Eden) is a 1992 Italian science fiction adventure film directed by Mario Orfini.

The film was a box office bomb, grossing just 158 million lire at the Italian box office against a budget of 18 billions lire.

== Plot ==
In Italy an old female billionaire has created a multinational company called Financial Youth Foundation, which has taken seven prodigies children who work with new computers. The purpose of the foundation is to restore youth to old with artificial products. The gardener of the villa of the old billionaire, Furio, discovers that this effect of youth, apparently beneficial, is a plan to exploit people with technology. So Furio is opposed to this system, so that the seven children and the younger generation can savor the beauty of nature, fighting the false and malicious technology.

== Cast ==
- Adriano Celentano as Furio
- Kate Vernon as Prudunce
- Salvatore Cascio as Cosimo
- Carroll Baker as Madame
- Scott Magensen as Vladimir
- Christopher Lee as Cedric
- Johnny Melville as Synthetic man

== See also ==
- List of Italian films of 1992
