= Who Wants to Kill Sara? =

- Directed by: Gianpaolo Tescari
- Written by: Silvia Napolitano
- Starring: Nancy Brilli; Giulio Scarpati
- Cinematography: Fernando Ciangola
- Music by: Antonio Di Pofi
- Release date: 1992
- Running time: 96 minutes
- Country: Italy
- Language: Italian

Who Wants to Kill Sara? (Italian: Tutti gli uomini di Sara) is a 1992 Italian giallo film written and directed by Gianpaolo Tescari and starring Nancy Brilli.

== Plot ==
Divorce attorney Sara Lancetti, soon to be married, starts getting notes and phone calls threatening her life if she marries. Hoping to identify the person who made the threats, she tries to track down all her former boyfriends.

== Cast ==
- Nancy Brilli as Sara Lancetti
- Giulio Scarpati as Max Altieri
- Claudio Bigagli as Daniele
- Antonella Lualdi as Miss Toscano
- Marie Laforêt as Sara's mother
- Luciano Bartoli as Riccardo
- Maurizio Donadoni as Andrea
- Antonella Fattori as Manuela
- Stéphane Ferrara as Nicolas
- François Perrot as Gomez

== See also ==
- List of Italian films of 1992
