= Belle al Bar =

- Directed by: Alessandro Benvenuti
- Written by: Alessandro Benvenuti; Ugo Chiti; Nicola Zavagli
- Starring: Alessandro Benvenuti; Eva Robin's
- Cinematography: Blasco Giurato
- Edited by: Carla Simoncelli
- Music by: Patrizio Fariselli
- Production company: Union P.N.
- Distributed by: United International Pictures
- Release date: 17 December 1994
- Country: Italy
- Language: Italian

Belle al Bar is a 1994 Italian comedy film directed, written and starred by Alessandro Benvenuti. The film follows an art restorer in an unhappy marriage who unexpectedly reunites with his transgender cousin, with the two striking an unconventional romance.

It won the 1995 Silver Ribbon for best script.

== Premise ==
Leo is an obsessive art restorer in an unhappy marriage. While at work away from home, he collapses and is aided by a beautiful woman. He awakens to find the person who took care of him was his cousin Giulio, now a transgender prostitute named Giulia. As the two reconnect, Giulia confesses that she has always been in love with Leo, while Leo begins falling for Giulia.

== Cast ==
- Alessandro Benvenuti as Leo
- Eva Robin's as Giulia
  - Salvatore Cammuca as young Giulio
- Assumpta Serna as Simona
- Giovanni Pellegrino as Gianni
- Andrea Brambilla as Guido
- Maurizio Comito as Arnaldo
- Pietro Ghislandi: Portiere di albergo

== Reception ==
Despite its Christmas release, the film failed to find an audience.
