= Leo Gullotta =

Italian actor

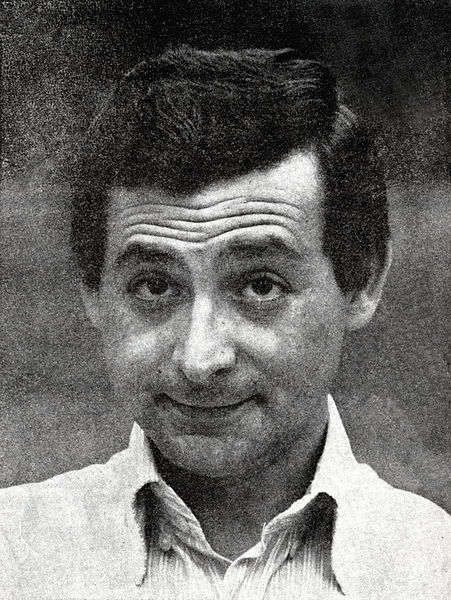
- Gullotta in 1979
- Born: Salvatore Leopoldo Gullotta; 9 January 1946 (age 80); Catania, Italy
- Occupations: Actor; voice actor; comedian; impressionist; writer
- Years active: 1964–present
- Spouse: Fabio Grossi (m. 2019)

Salvatore Leopoldo "Leo" Gullotta (born 9 January 1946) is an Italian actor, voice actor, comedian and writer. He became known for his role in Café Express (1980), and has won several David di Donatello awards, the first one being for his role in Giuseppe Tornatore's The Professor (1986).

== Biography ==
Gullotta started his career as an extra in Teatro Massimo Bellini, and in 1970, he entered the stage company of the Teatro Stabile di Catania. In his long career as an actor, Gullotta has starred in about 100 films and has participated in numerous shows and drama series for television.

He became widely known for his role in Nanni Loy's Café Express, a Commedia all'italiana hit in 1980. He has worked with director and screenwriter Giuseppe Tornatore at least five times. Gullotta has also starred in many theatrical plays and dramas, and was part of the Il Bagaglino theater company.

Gullotta is also a well-known voice actor; as a voice dubber, he provided the Italian voice of Manny in the first three films of the Ice Age film series, reprising this role in short films and video games. He also dubbed Burt Young in Rocky, Joe Pesci in Once Upon a Time in America, Moonwalker, My Cousin Vinny and The Irishman, and the robot Johnny 5 in Short Circuit. He also became the new Italian voice of Woody Allen after the death of Oreste Lionello in 2009.

In 2010, Gullotta celebrated fifty years of his career.

== Other activities ==
In 2020, along with Francesco Calogero, Gullotta was artistic director of Taormina Film Fest.

== Awards ==
In 1987, Gullotta won his first David di Donatello for Best Supporting Actor for his role in The Professor by Giuseppe Tornatore.

In 1997 and 2000, respectively, he won two more David di Donatello for Best Supporting Actor, for the Maurizio Zaccaro films The Game Bag and A Respectable Man.

Gullotta has also won two Silver Ribbons for Best supporting Actor, in 1984 for Where's Picone? by Nanni Loy and in 2001 for Vajont by Renzo Martinelli.

In 2010, he won the Flaiano Prize as stage actor of the year.

== Personal life ==
Gullotta is openly gay. He did not reveal his sexuality to the public until 1995. In 2019, he entered into civil union with the actor and playwright Fabio Grossi, who was his partner of 32 years. He considers himself Roman Catholic.

== Selected filmography ==
- Lo voglio maschio (1971)
- The Nurse on a Military Tour (1977) – Captain Lopez – doctor
- Swindle (1977) – Tarcisio Pollaroli "Er Fibbia"
- Ride bene... chi ride ultimo (1977) – Ifigenia' (segment "Sedotto e violentato)
- Rock 'n' Roll (1978) – Il vigile
- Café Express (1980) – Imbastaro
- Stark System (1980) – Schioppa
- I carabbinieri (1981) – Salvatore Caruso
- L'onorevole con l'amante sotto il letto (1981) – Segretaria Sgarbozzi / Onorevole Sgarbozzi
- L'esercito più pazzo del mondo (1981) – Trasformista
- Teste di quoio (1981) – Carrisi (l'interprete)
- I carabbimatti (1981) – Carabiniere Pasta
- Il paramedico (1982) – Attorney
- Spaghetti House (1982) – Salvatore Manzilla
- Sturmtruppen 2 (tutti al fronte) (1982) – Recluta
- Heads I Win, Tails You Lose (1982) – Walter
- Miss Right (1982) – Benito
- Where's Picone? (1984) – Sgueglia
- Giuseppe Fava: Siciliano come me (1984)
- Mezzo destro mezzo sinistro - 2 calciatori senza pallone (1985) – Juan Carlos Fulgencio
- Il Bi e il Ba (1986) – Gaetano
- The Professor (1986) – Comissario Iervolino
- Grandi magazzini (1986) – Simoni
- Italiani a Rio (1987) – Salvatore Giuffrida
- Tango blu (1987) – Fior da Fiore
- Animali metropolitani (1987) – Don Michele Amitrano
- Cinema Paradiso (1988) – Usher
- Operazione pappagallo (1988)
- Sinbad of the Seven Seas (1989) – Nadir
- Street Kids (1989) – Fortunato Assante
- L'insegnante di violoncello (1989) – Leo
- Everybody's Fine (1990) – Uomo armato sul tetto
- Nel giardino delle rose (1990) – Armando
- Gole ruggenti (1992) – Edoardo Lasagnetta (scriptwriter)
- Agnieszka (1992) – Franco
- Pacco, doppio pacco e contropaccotto (1993) – Il frodatore fiscale conto terzi
- The Escort (1993) – Policeman
- Sì!... Ma vogliamo un maschio (1994)
- Men Men Men (1995) – Tony
- The Star Maker (1995) – Vito
- Selvaggi (1995) – Luigi
- Snowball (1995) – Sidik
- Carogne (1995) – Prandstaller
- Bruno Is Waiting on the Car (1996) – Ziino
- 3 (1996) – Bishop of Pisa
- The Game Bag (1997) – Carlo Gabbiadini
- Io, tu e tua sorella (1997) – Dr. Fabietti
- I corti italiani (1997)
- Gli inaffidabili (1997) – Bostik
- Simpatici & antipatici (1998) – Gigetto
- A Respectable Man (1999) – Giovanni Pandico
- Oltremare (1999)
- Scarlet Diva (2000) – Dr. Vessi
- Territori d'ombra (2001) – Antonio
- Vajont (2001) – Mario Pancini
- In questo mondo di ladri (2004) – Leonardo
- Guardians of the Clouds (2004) – La Rocca
- Il cuore nel pozzo (2005, TV movie) – Don Bruno
- Incidenti (2005) – Giornalista
- Fatti della banda della Magliana (2005) – Il giudice
- Monógamo sucesivo (2006)
- Baarìa (2009) – Liborio
- The Father and the Foreigner (2010) – Santini
- Fantasmi al Valle (2012) – Luigi Pirandello
- Italo (2014) – Narrator (voice)
- It's the Law (2017) – Padre Raffaele
- Sono solo fantasmi (2019)
- Framed! A Sicilian Murder Mystery (2022-)

== Voice work ==
Year	Title	Role	Notes
2002	Il principe dei dinosauri	Sluggard	Animated film
2004	Leo the Lion	Cobo	Animated film
2010	Ma che storia...	Voice-over	Documentary
2012	La missione di 3P	Pino Puglisi	Animated film
2014	Sul Vulcano	Voice-over	Documentary
2014	Italo	Narrator	Comedy
2014	Giovanni e Paolo e il mistero dei pupi	Salvatore, Lisca	Animated film
2016	Donne	Narrator	TV miniseries
2018	La stella di Andra e Tati	Andra's Father	Animated film

=== Dubbing ===
==== Animation ====
- Manny in Ice Age, Ice Age: The Meltdown, Ice Age: Dawn of the Dinosaurs, The Ice Age Adventures of Buck Wild
- Mr. Big in Zootopia
- Tiger in An American Tail
- Hans Blix in Team America: World Police
- Yattaran in Space Pirate Captain Harlock

==== Live action ====
- Frankie Minaldi in Once Upon a Time in America
- Frankie Lideo in Moonwalker
- Vinny Gambini in My Cousin Vinny
- Russell Bufalino in The Irishman
- Jerry in To Rome with Love
- Murray Schwartz in Fading Gigolo
- Sidney Munsinger in Crisis in Six Scenes
- Jacquasse la Crasse / Jacques-Henri Jacquard in The Visitors
- Asterix in Asterix and Obelix vs. Caesar
- Paulie Pennino in Rocky
- Sergeant Royko in Blood Bath
- Malcolm Stinnett in The Sentinel
- Zed McGlunk in Police Academy 2: Their First Assignment, Police Academy 4: Citizens on Patrol
- Nighthob in The NeverEnding Story
- Johnny 5 in Short Circuit
- Nick in The Inglorious Bastards
- Lou Friedlander in Slow Dancing in the Big City
- Medical Examiner in Tightrope
- Christian Reall in Drums Along the Mohawk (1970 redub)
- Sandman Williams in The Cotton Club
- Eddie's Bodyguard in The Big Sleep
- Mac in Local Hero
- Salieri's Valet in Amadeus
- It-Psammead in Five Children and It
- Francis Reggio in Le Boulet
- Limbo in Planet of the Apes
- Archie in Dr. Dolittle 2
- Prophet Jack in Life or Something Like It
- Judge in Kiss of Death
- Boy Mulcaster in Brideshead Revisited
- Inspector in A Pure Formality
- Michou in La Crise

=== Books ===
- Gullotta, L. (1998). Mille fili d'erba. I dialoghi (in Italian). Rome: Di Renzo Editore. ISBN 88-86044-87-9.
