= Flavio Giurato =

Italian singer-songwriter (born 1949)

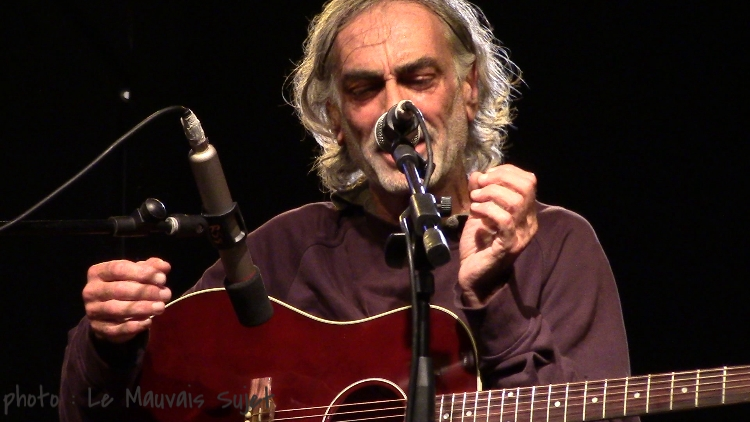
- Giurato in 2014

Background information
- Born: 10 January 1949 (age 76); Rome, Italy
- Occupations: Singer; songwriter
- Years active: 1978–present

Flavio Giurato (born 10 January 1949) is an Italian singer-songwriter.

== Career ==
Flavio Giurato, son of diplomat Giovanni Giurato, started his career as a songwriter, penning songs for artists like Anna Melato in the 1970s. He is the brother of journalist Luca Giurato, geologist Claudia Giurato, and cinematographer Blasco Giurato. His maternal grandfather was playwright Giovacchino Forzano.

Giurato signed with Dischi Ricordi and released his debut album, Per futili motivi, in 1978, a concept album telling a boy's story during the fascist era and the onset of World War II. The album gained popularity on private radio, particularly for its title track and "Che ne sapevo".

His next album, Il tuffatore (1982), released under CGD, is regarded as his masterpiece, receiving further acclaim through music videos featured on the show Mister Fantasy. This album blends acoustic tracks with catchy melodies and revolves around a love story set during a tennis tournament in Orbetello, interspersed with reflections on youth. The album is ranked 84th in Rolling Stone Italia's list of the 100 greatest Italian albums of all time.

Giurato's subsequent work, Marco Polo (1984), did not achieve similar success, resulting in the termination of his contract with the label. Giurato continued to compose and perform intermittently but did not release any albums for 15 years, during which he also worked on documentaries. He later released Il manuale del cantautore (2002), La scomparsa di Majorana (2015), and Le promesse del mondo (2017).

== Discography ==
=== Studio albums ===
- Per futili motivi (1978)
- Il tuffatore (1982)
- Marco Polo (1984)
- Il manuale del cantautore (2007)
- La scomparsa di Majorana (2015)
- Le promesse del mondo (2017)

=== Live albums ===
- Il manuale del cantautore (2002)
- Flavio Giurato Live (2004)

== Sources ==
- Gino Castaldo, ed. (1990). Enciclopedia della canzone italiana. Armando Curcio.
- Enrico Deregibus, ed. (2006). Dizionario completo della canzone italiana. Giunti.
- Gianluca Testani, ed. (2006). Enciclopedia del rock italiano. Arcana Editrice.
