= Where the Night Begins =

1991 drama film

- Directed by: Maurizio Zaccaro
- Screenplay by: Pupi Avati
- Produced by: Antonio Avati; Aurelio De Laurentiis; Luigi De Laurentiis
- Starring: Tom Gallop
- Cinematography: Pasquale Rachini
- Edited by: Amedeo Salfa
- Music by: Stefano Caprioli
- Release date: 1991
- Language: English

Where the Night Begins (Italian: Dove comincia la notte) is a 1991 Italian mystery horror film written by Pupi Avati and directed by Maurizio Zaccaro in his directorial debut. It premiered at the 48th Venice International Film Festival.

== Cast ==
- Tom Gallop as Irving
- Cara Wilder as Nora
- Don Pearson as Lee
- Kim Mai Guest as Sybil
- Blair Bybee as Denny
- Jerry Y. Wolking as Greg

== Production ==
The film was produced by Duea and Filmauro with the participation of Rai 1. It was shot in Davenport, Iowa, where the screenwriter Pupi Avati was shooting at the same time his film Bix. Film historian Roberto Curti noted "having the stories take place in an anonymous, cold, and squalid Midwestern environment was dictated not just by commercial needs, but mainly by the effort to provoke a similar disorientation as Avati's previous Po Valley Gothics". It had a budget of 800 million lire.

== Release ==
The film had its world premiere at the 48th edition of the Venice Film Festival, in the Mattinate del Cinema Italiano ("Italian Cinema Mornings") sidebar.

== Reception ==
Corriere della Sera's film critic Maurizio Porro praised the film, calling it "a cleverly crafted film". Paolo Mereghetti also lauded the film, noting it uses "a giallo premise as a framework for an effective collective psychodrama, depicting a reality in which everything wavers and disintegrates within an America portrayed as the European dream turned into a nightmare." Roberto Curti described it as "an understated ghost story devoid of jump scares", in which Avati "uses the American Gothic tropes to construct a deeply Catholic meditation on the sense of guilt", but in a "so restrained and subdued way that it results in a self-punishing flatness that seems to echo that of the protagonist".

For this film, Zaccaro won the David di Donatello for Best Directorial Debut and received a Nastro d'Argento nomination as Best New Director.
