= Salvatore Cascio =

Italian actor (born 1979)

- Born: 8 November 1979 (age 46); Palazzo Adriano, Sicily, Italy
- Occupation: Actor
- Years active: 1988–2001
- Known for: Cinema Paradiso

Salvatore Cascio (born 8 November 1979) is an Italian actor. His most famous performance was in Cinema Paradiso (1988), for which he received critical acclaim and a BAFTA Award. He has retinitis pigmentosa.

== Filmography ==
Year	Title	Role	Notes
1988	Cinema Paradiso	Salvatore 'Totò' Di Vita (child)	Won BAFTA Award for Best Actor in a Supporting Role
1990	There Was a Castle with Forty Dogs	Tom	
1990	Everybody's Fine	Alvaro enfant	
1990	Breath of Life	Adelmo	
1990	II Ricatto 2		Episode: "Bambini nell'ombra"
1991	The Pope Must Die	Paulo	
1992	Jackpot	Cosimo	
2001	Il morso del serpente		TV movie
