= Do You Mind If I Kiss Mommy? =

2003 film

- Directed by: Alessandro Benvenuti
- Written by: Alessandro Benvenuti; Ugo Chiti
- Starring: Alessandro Benvenuti; Natasha Stefanenko
- Cinematography: Alessio Gelsini Torresi
- Edited by: Carla Simoncelli
- Music by: Patrizio Fariselli
- Release date: November 7, 2003
- Running time: 120 minutes
- Country: Italy
- Language: Italian

Do You Mind If I Kiss Mommy? (Italian: Ti spiace se bacio mamma?) is a 2003 Italian comedy film directed by Alessandro Benvenuti.

== Cast ==
- Alessandro Benvenuti as Sandro
- Natasha Stefanenko as Lena
- Arnoldo Foà as Renato
- Marina Massironi as Lorenza
- Annalisa Favetti as Loriana
- Stefania Barca as Loretta
- Maria Cristina Heller as Laura
- Zoe Incrocci as Bettina Patti
- Carla Macelloni as Serenella Marini
- Massimo Corvo as Rodolfo
- Prospero Richelmy as Alberto
- Claudia Lawrence as Santa
- Valeria Sabel as Cia
- Luciana Palombi as Tatiana
