= Lucia Poli =

Italian actress, playwright and stage director

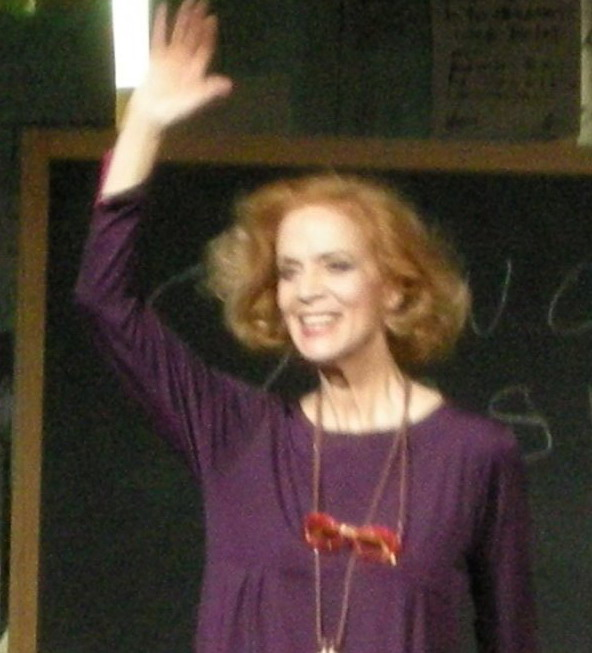
- Poli in 2011
- Born: 14 June 1940 (age 84); Florence, Kingdom of Italy
- Occupation: Actress

Lucia Poli (born 14 June 1940) is an Italian actress, playwright and stage director.

== Life and career ==
Born in Florence, Italy, the sister of the actor Paolo, Poli began her career in 1970 with the children's theater. In the mid-1970s she formed her own stage company and started writing her works, characterized by social and feminist themes and by a peculiar comic verve, filled with paradoxical and satirical moods.

Poli was also active on radio, television and cinema; in 1997 she won the Nastro d'Argento for Best Supporting Actress for her performance in the Ugo Chiti's comedy film Albergo Roma.
