= Paperino, Tuscany =

Paperino
- Frazione
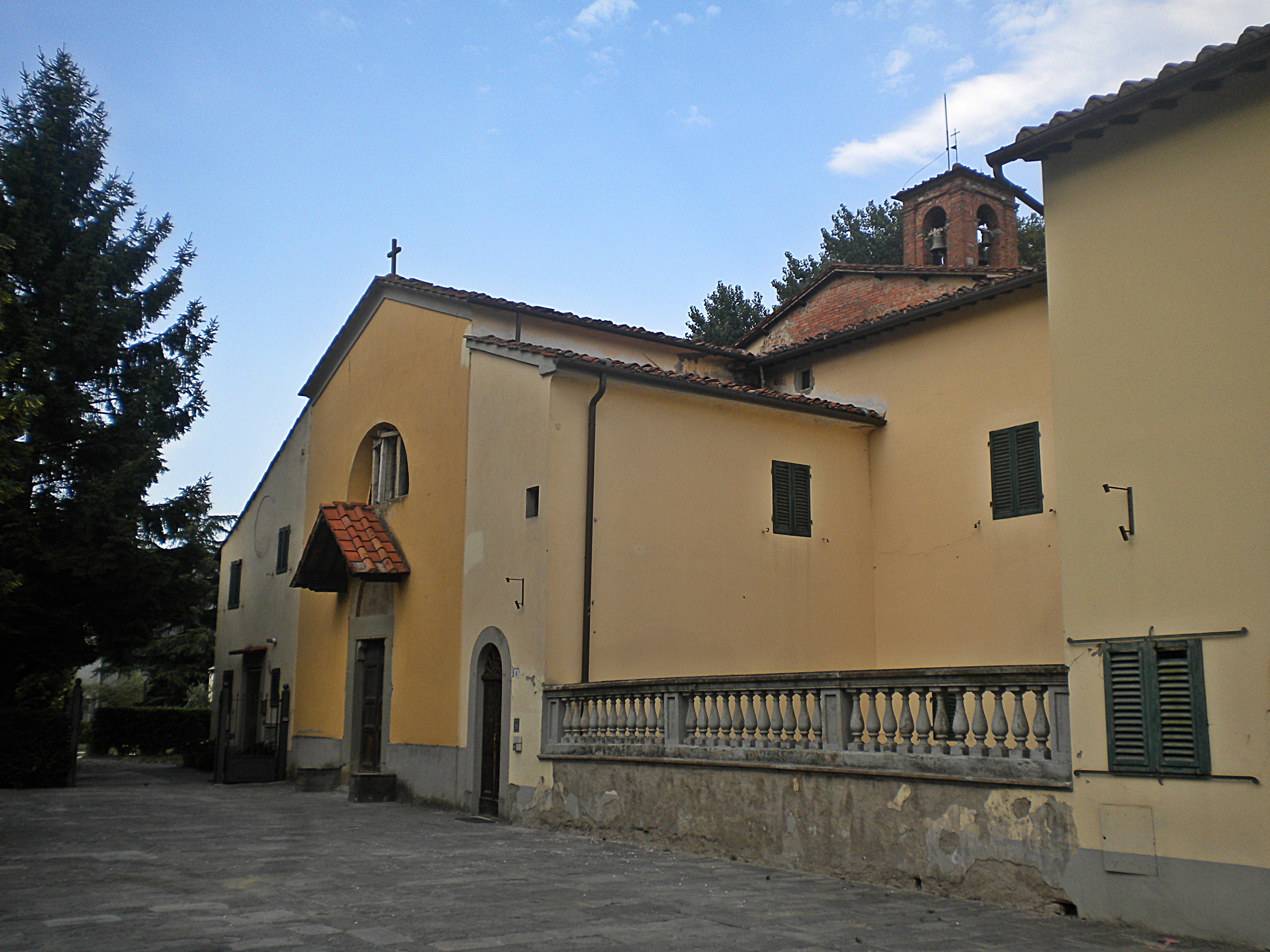
- The church of San Martino

- Location of Paperino in Italy
- Coordinates: 43°50′38″N 11°5′13″E
- Country: Italy
- Region: Tuscany
- Province: Prato (PO)
- Comune: Prato
- Elevation: 38 m (125 ft)
- Time zone: UTC+1 (CET)
  - Summer (DST): UTC+2 (CEST)

Paperino is a village in Tuscany, central Italy, administratively a frazione of the comune of Prato, province of Prato. It is located about 6 km from the centre of Prato and 22 km from Florence.

The 1981 comedy film West of Paperino is named after this village.

== Bibliography ==
- Emanuele Repetti (1841). "Paperino". Dizionario geografico fisico storico della Toscana (in Italian). Vol. 4. Florence. p. 56.
