= Cinema Paradiso =

1988 film by Giuseppe Tornatore

- Italian theatrical release poster by Cecco Cecchini
- Italian: Nuovo Cinema Paradiso
- Directed by: Giuseppe Tornatore
- Written by: Giuseppe Tornatore
- Produced by: Franco Cristaldi; Giovanna Romagnoli
- Starring: Philippe Noiret; Jacques Perrin; Antonella Attili; Pupella Maggio; Salvatore Cascio
- Cinematography: Blasco Giurato
- Edited by: Mario Morra
- Music by: Ennio Morricone; Andrea Morricone
- Production companies: Cristaldi Film; Les Films Ariane; RAI; TF1; Forum Picture
- Distributed by: Titanus (Italy); Ariane Distribution (France)
- Release dates: 17 November 1988 (Italy); 20 September 1989 (France)
- Running time: 155 minutes
- Countries: Italy; France
- Language: Italian
- Budget: US$5 million
- Box office: $36 million (US/France/Italy only)

Cinema Paradiso (Italian: Nuovo Cinema Paradiso, Italian pronunciation: [ˈnwɔːvo ˈtʃiːnema paraˈdiːzo], lit. 'New Paradise Cinema') is a 1988 coming-of-age comedy-drama film written and directed by Giuseppe Tornatore.

Set in a fictional small Sicilian town, called Giancaldo, the film centres on the friendship between a young boy and an aging projectionist who works at the titular movie theatre. The Italian-French co-production stars Philippe Noiret, Jacques Perrin, Antonella Attili, Pupella Maggio and Salvatore Cascio. The film score was composed by Ennio Morricone and his son, Andrea, marking the beginning of a collaboration between Tornatore and Morricone that lasted until Morricone's death in 2020.

Credited with revitalizing Italy's film industry, Cinema Paradiso has been cited as one of the greatest films of all time, and a world cinema classic. The ending is considered among the greatest endings in film history. It was a commercial success, and won several awards, including the Academy Award for Best Foreign Language Film and the Cannes Film Festival's Grand Prix. It was nominated for 11 BAFTA Awards and won five; including Best Actor for Philippe Noiret, Best Supporting Actor for Salvatore Cascio, Best Original Screenplay, and Best Foreign Language Film, a record for a foreign language feature until it was broken by All Quiet on the Western Front in 2023.

== Plot ==
In 1988 Rome, Salvatore Di Vita, a famous film director, returns home late one evening, where his girlfriend sleepily tells him that his mother called to say someone named Alfredo has died. Salvatore shies from committed relationships and has not been to his home village of Giancaldo, Sicily, in thirty years. As his girlfriend asks him who Alfredo was, Salvatore is unable to fall asleep and flashes back to his childhood.

A few years after World War II, eight-year-old Salvatore is the mischievous, intelligent son of a war widow. Nicknamed Totò, he discovers a love for films and spends every free moment at the local movie house, Cinema Paradiso. Although they initially start on tense terms, he develops a friendship with the middle-aged projectionist, Alfredo, who often lets him watch films from the projection booth. During the shows, the audience can be heard booing because there are missing sections, causing the films to suddenly jump, bypassing scenes with romantic kisses or embraces. The local priest, the owner of the cinema, had ordered these sections to be censored, and the deleted scenes are cut from the film reels by Alfredo and piled on the projection room floor, where Alfredo keeps them until he can splice them back in for the film to be sent to the next town.

Alfredo eventually teaches Salvatore how to operate the film projector. One day, Cinema Paradiso catches fire as Alfredo is projecting The Firemen of Viggiù after hours, on the wall of a nearby house. Salvatore saves Alfredo's life, but not before a reel of nitrate film explodes in Alfredo's face, leaving him permanently blind. The movie house is rebuilt by a town citizen, Ciccio Spaccafico from Naples, using his winnings from a football lottery. Salvatore, still a child, is hired as the new projectionist, as only he knows how to run the machines.

About a decade later, Salvatore, now in high school, is still operating the projector at the "Nuovo Cinema Paradiso". His relationship with the blind Alfredo has strengthened, and Salvatore often looks to him for help – advice that Alfredo often dispenses by quoting classic films. Salvatore has been experimenting with filming, using a home movie camera; doing this he has met, and captured on film, a girl named Elena Mendola, daughter of a wealthy banker, and has fallen in love with her. Salvatore woos – and wins – Elena's heart, only to lose her due to her father's disapproval.

As Elena and her family move away, Salvatore leaves town for compulsory military service. His attempts to write to Elena are fruitless; his letters are returned as undeliverable. Upon his return from the military, Alfredo urges Salvatore to leave Giancaldo permanently, counselling that the town is too small for Salvatore to ever find his dreams. Moreover, the old man tells him that once he leaves he must pursue his destiny wholeheartedly, never looking back and never returning, even to visit; he must never give in to nostalgia or even write or think about them. They tearfully embrace, and Salvatore leaves to pursue his future as a filmmaker.

Back in the present, Salvatore realizes that he is very satisfied with his life from a professional point of view but not from a personal one, so decides to return home to attend Alfredo's funeral. Though the town has changed greatly, he now understands why Alfredo thought it was important that he leave. Alfredo's widow tells him that the old man followed Salvatore's successes with pride and he left him something: an unlabelled film reel and the old stool that Salvatore once stood on to operate the projector. Salvatore learns that Cinema Paradiso is to be demolished to make way for a parking lot. At the funeral, he recognizes the faces of many people who attended the cinema when he was the projectionist.

Salvatore returns to Rome where he watches Alfredo's reel and discovers that it comprises all the romantic scenes that the priest had ordered Alfredo to cut from the films; Alfredo had spliced every kiss together to form a single reel. Totò comes to peace with his past, smiling with tears in his eyes.

== Cast ==
- Philippe Noiret as Alfredo
- Salvatore Cascio as child Salvatore Di Vita
  - Marco Leonardi as teenage Salvatore
  - Jacques Perrin as adult Salvatore
- Antonella Attili as Maria Di Vita
  - Pupella Maggio as old Maria
- Agnese Nano as Elena Mendola
  - Brigitte Fossey as adult Elena (director's cut only)
- Enzo Cannavale as Spaccafico
- Isa Danieli as Anna
- Leopoldo Trieste as Father Adelfio
- Roberta Lena as Lia
- Nino Terzo as Peppino's father
- Leo Gullotta as the usher
- Tano Cimarosa as the blacksmith
- Nicola Di Pinto as the village idiot

== Production ==
Cinema Paradiso was shot in director Tornatore's hometown Bagheria, Sicily, as well as Cefalù on the Tyrrhenian Sea. The town square in the film is Piazza Umberto I in the village of Palazzo Adriano, about 48 kilometres (30 mi) south of Palermo. The Paradiso Cinema was built there, at Via Nino Bixio, overlooking the octagonal Baroque fountain, which dates from 1608.

Seen as an example of "nostalgic postmodernism", the film intertwines sentimentality with comedy, and nostalgia with pragmaticism. It explores issues of youth, coming of age, and reflections (in adulthood) about the past. The imagery in the scenes can be said to reflect Salvatore's idealised memories of his childhood. Cinema Paradiso is also a celebration of films; as a projectionist, young Salvatore (a.k.a. Totò) develops a passion for films that shapes his life path in adulthood.

== Releases ==
The film exists in multiple versions. It was originally released in Italy at 155 minutes, but poor box office performance in its native country led to its being shortened to 124 minutes for international release; in that form it was successful. The shorter international version contributed significantly to the film's wider distribution outside Italy, where the original release had struggled commercially. This version was selected for the Panorama section of the 39th Berlin International Film Festival, but following a La Stampa interview with the festival's artistic director, Moritz de Hadeln, which included negative remarks about the film, particularly in comparison to Ettore Scola's similarly themed Splendor, Tornatore and producer Franco Cristaldi decided to withdraw it from the festival. It was later selected for the main competition at the 1989 Cannes Film Festival, winning the Special Jury Prize, and later won the 1989 Academy Award for Best Foreign Language Film. In 2002, the director's cut 173-minute version was released (known in the United States. as Cinema Paradiso: The New Version), although this was the original version, used at the film's premiere at the Europa Cinema Festival in Bari on 29 September 1988.

=== Director's cut ===
In the 173-minute version of the film, after the funeral, Salvatore notices an adolescent girl who resembles the teenage Elena. He follows as she rides her scooter to her home, which allows Salvatore to contact his long-lost love Elena, who is revealed to be the girl's mother. Salvatore calls her in hopes of rekindling their romance; she initially rejects him, but later reconsiders and goes to see Salvatore, who was contemplating his rejection at a favorite location from their early years. Their meeting ultimately leads to a sex session in her car. He learns that she had married an acquaintance from his school years, who became a local politician of modest means. Afterwards, feeling cheated, he strives to rekindle their romance, and while she clearly wishes it were possible, she rejects his entreaties, choosing to remain with her family and leave their romance in the past.

During their evening together, a frustrated Salvatore asks Elena why she never contacted him or left word of where her family was moving to. He learns that the reason they lost touch was because Alfredo asked her not to see him again, fearing that Salvatore's romantic fulfillment would only destroy what Alfredo sees as Salvatore's destiny – to be successful in the cinema world. Alfredo tried to convince her that if she loved Salvatore, she should leave him for his own good. Elena explains to Salvatore that, against Alfredo's instruction, she had secretly left a note with an address where she could be reached and a promise of undying love and loyalty. Salvatore realizes that he never found that note, and thus lost his true love for more than thirty years. The next morning, Salvatore returns to the decaying Cinema Paradiso and frantically searches through the piles of old film invoices pinned to the wall of the projection booth. There, on the reverse side of one of the dockets, he finds the handwritten note Elena had left thirty years earlier.

The film ends with Salvatore returning to Rome and, with teary eyes, viewing the film reel that Alfredo left.

== Home media ==
A special edition of Cinema Paradiso was released on DVD by Umbrella Entertainment on 4 September 2006. The DVD is compatible with all region codes and includes special features such as the theatrical trailer, the director's cut, scenes from the director's cut, the Ennio Morricone soundtrack and a documentary on Giuseppe Tornatore.

An Academy Award edition of Cinema Paradiso was released on DVD by Umbrella Entertainment on 1 February 2009. It is also compatible with all region codes and includes different special features such as Umbrella Entertainment trailers, cast and crew biographies and the director's filmography.

On 1 July 2011, Umbrella Entertainment released the film on Blu-ray. Arrow released a remastered special edition Blu-ray of the film, with both theatrical and extended cuts, in 2017.

In June 2020, Arrow Films announced a 4K UHD Blu-ray release with both of the aforementioned cuts due for September of that year, with the 124-minute theatrical cut as a 4K UHD presentation, the 174-minute director's cut as a Blu-ray presentation.

== Reception ==
=== Box office ===
Cinema Paradiso was a box-office success.

The film was released twice in Italy before its Cannes win and flopped at the box office both times. After the Cannes win it was re-released and performed steadily however, following its Academy Award success, it was released again and performed better, grossing $5.3 million in Italy. In France, the film ran for over a year, grossing over $19 million. In the United States and Canada, it grossed $12.3 million. In Japan, the film grossed ¥369 million during a 40-week run at Tokyo's Cine Switch Ginza, while its 1990 release in South Korea attracted approximately 270,000 admissions in Seoul.

=== Critical response ===
Cinema Paradiso received widespread critical acclaim, making Tornatore internationally known, and is regarded by many as a classic. On the review aggregator website Rotten Tomatoes, the film holds an approval rating of 90% based on 84 reviews, with an average rating of 8.2/10. The website's critics consensus reads, "Cinema Paradiso is a life-affirming ode to the power of youth, nostalgia, and the the [sic] movies themselves." Metacritic, which uses a weighted average, assigned the film a score of 80 out of 100, based on 21 reviews, indicating "generally favorable" reviews. It is particularly renowned for the "kissing scenes" montage at the film's end. Winning the Academy Award for Best Foreign Film in 1989, the film is often credited with reviving Italy's film industry, which later produced Mediterraneo (1991) and Life Is Beautiful (1997).

Film critic Roger Ebert gave it 3.5 stars out of four and four stars out of four for the extended version, declaring "Still, I'm happy to have seen it—not as an alternate version, but as the ultimate exercise in viewing deleted scenes." Oddly, despite giving a higher rating to the extended version, Ebert maintained that the theatrical version was superior: "I must confess that the shorter version of Cinema Paradiso is a better film than the longer."

The film was ranked number 27 in Empire magazine's "The 100 Best Films of World Cinema" in 2010. In 2016, the Directors Guild of America ranked the film 69th on its list of The 80 Best-Directed Films since the Guild’s founding in 1936.

=== Accolades ===
French poster, by Jouineau Bourduge, the last film poster to win a César Award

- 1989: Cannes Film Festival
  - Grand Prix du Jury (tied with Trop belle pour toi)
- 1989: Golden Globes
  - Best Foreign Language Film
- 1989: Academy Awards
  - Best Foreign Language Film
- 1990: César Awards
  - César Award for Best Poster: Jouineau Bourduge
- 1991: BAFTA Awards
  - BAFTA Award for Best Film Not in the English Language
  - Best Actor: Philippe Noiret
  - Best Actor in a Supporting Role: Salvatore Cascio
  - Best Original Screenplay: Giuseppe Tornatore
  - Best Film Music: Ennio Morricone and Andrea Morricone

== In popular culture ==
The famed "kissing scene" montage at the end of the film was used in "Stealing First Base", an episode of The Simpsons that aired on 21 March 2010, during its twenty-first season. The scene used Morricone's "Love Theme" and included animated clips of famous movie kisses, including scenes used in Cinema Paradiso as well as contemporary films not shown in the original film. American progressive metal band Dream Theater 1992 album Images and Words' song "Take the Time" features in the lyrics the sentence spoken by Alfredo after the fire, "ora che ho perso la vista, ci vedo di più! (I can see much clearer now I'm blind)".

== See also ==
- List of submissions to the 62nd Academy Awards for Best Foreign Language Film
- List of Italian submissions for the Academy Award for Best Foreign Language Film
