= Nancy Brilli =

Italian actress (born 1964)

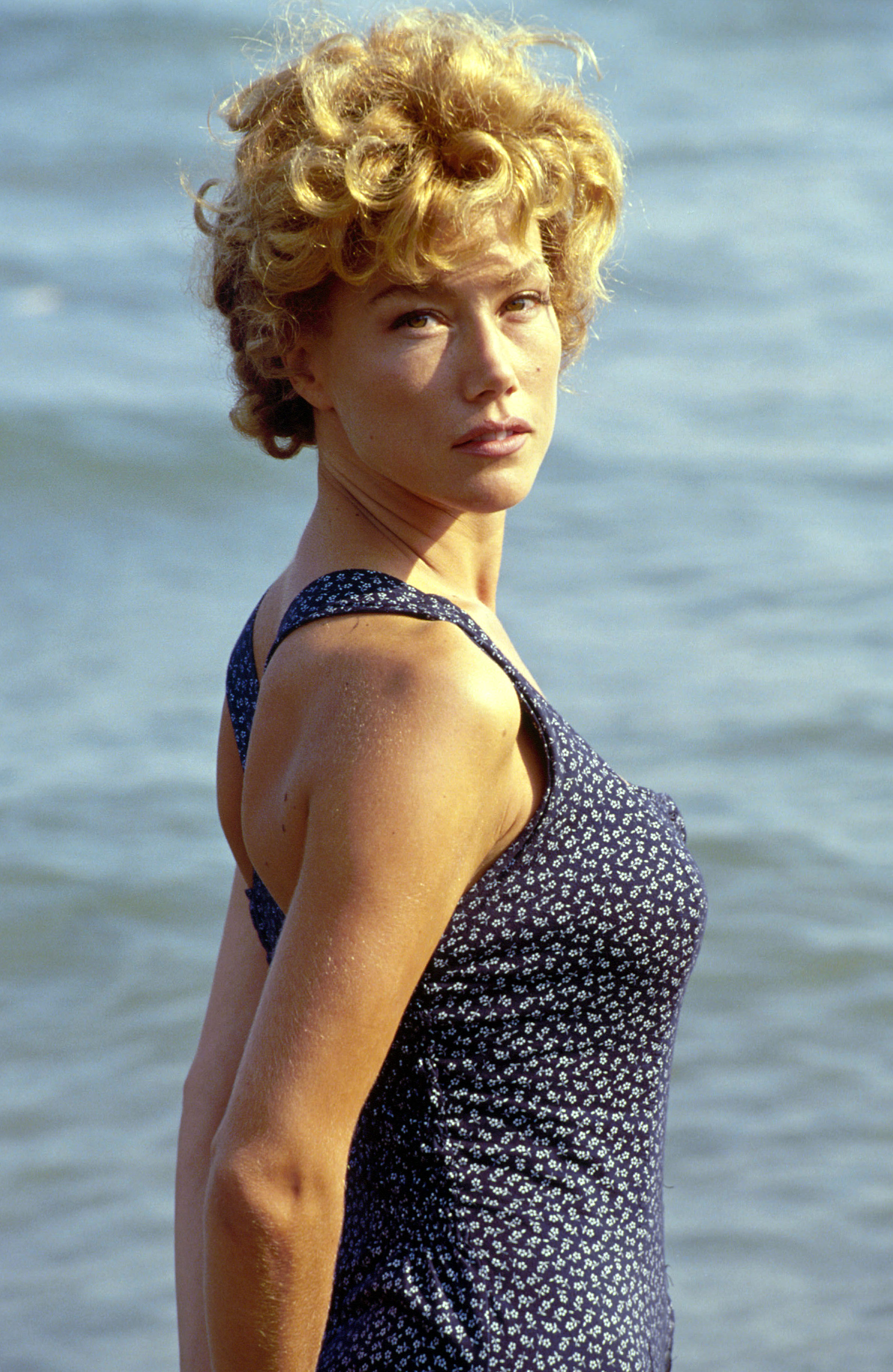
- Born: Nicoletta Brilli; 10 April 1964 (age 61); Rome, Italy
- Occupation: Actress

Nancy Brilli (Italian pronunciation: [ˈnɛnsi ˈbrilli]; born 10 April 1964 as Nicoletta Brilli) is an Italian film, television and stage actress.

== Career ==
Born in Rome, of partial Ukrainian origin, Nancy Brilli was introduced in cinema by Pasquale Squitieri, making her debut in a role of note in Claretta (1984). In 1990 she won a David di Donatello for Best Supporting Actress and a Silver Ribbon in the same category for the role of Sophie in Little Misunderstandings.

== Personal life ==
Nancy Brilli was married for two years to actor Massimo Ghini and later, again for two years, to director Luca Manfredi, son of actor and director Nino Manfredi. Previously she had a relationship with the songwriter Ivano Fossati.

In 1994 she discovered she suffered from endometriosis and underwent the removal of an ovarian cancer.

She is a niece of the racing driver Gastone Brilli-Peri.

== Filmography ==
=== Film ===
Year	Title	Role(s)	Notes
1984	Claretta	Young Miriam Petacci	
1986	Demons 2	Hannah	
1986	Body Count	Tracy	
1987	Under the Chinese Restaurant	Ursula	
1988	Compagni di scuola	Federica Polidori	
1989	Little Misunderstandings	Sophie	
1990	Italia-Germania 4-3	Giulia	
1992	Who Wants to Kill Sara?	Sara Lancetti	
1996	Bruno aspetta in macchina	Margherita	
1997	Lady and the Tramp	Peg (voice)	Italian voice-over (1997 re-dubbed version)
1997	Grazie di tutto	Francesca Pacifico	
1998	Rudolph the Red-Nosed Reindeer: The Movie	Stormella (voice)	Italian voice-over
1999	Meglio tardi che mai	Chiara Brandini	
2000	Chicken Run	Ginger (voice)	Italian voice-over
2002	Febbre da cavallo – La mandrakata	Aurelia Santarelli	
2002	Il compagno americano	Lilian Grey	
2007	Natale in crociera	Francesca Zanchi	
2008	Un'estate al mare	Luciana Morabito	
2009	Many Kisses Later	Caterina	
2010	La vita è una cosa meravigliosa	Elena	
2010	Men vs. Women	Paola	
2010	A Natale mi sposo	Sara	
2011	Women vs. Men	Paola	
2014	Sapore di te	Elena Proietti	
2017	Tiro libero	Diana	
2022	Amici per la pelle	Filippo's Mother	
2023	Un weekend particolare	Elena	

=== Television ===
Year	Title	Role(s)	Notes
1986	Naso di cane	Rosa	Miniseries (3 episodes)
1988	Due fratelli	Monique Garlin	Television movie
1990	Il colore della vittoria	Dorina	Television movie
1990	Un cane sciolto	Claudia Baldazzi	Television movie
1993	Papà prende moglie	Francesca Banfi	Co-lead role (8 episodes)
1994	Italian Restaurant	Connie Mancuso	Main role (8 episodes)
1996	Ci vediamo in tribunale	Giulia	Television movie
1998	Vado e torno	Nicoletta	Television movie
1999–2002	Commesse	Roberta Ardenzi	Main role (12 episodes)
2001–2003	Il bello delle donne	Vittoria Violetta Melzi	Main role (36 episodes)
2003	I ragazzi della via Pal	Anna Nemecsek	Television movie
2004	Madame	Emma Benasso Tarlazzi	Television movie
2005	I colori della vita	Adua Del Vesco	Television movie
2006	Zecchino d'Oro	Herself / Co-host	Children's singing contest
2007	Donne sbagliate	Anna	Television movie
2007	Caterina e le sue figlie	Renata	Main role (season 2; 6 episodes)
2016	Matrimoni e altre follie	Luisella Rossini	Lead role (24 episodes)
2022	Drag Race Italia	Herself / Guest judge	Episode: "Colorful Drag, Lucky Drag"
2024	Pechino Express	Herself / Contestant	Reality show (season 11)
2025	Ballando con le Stelle	Herself / Contestant	Reality competition (season 20)

== Awards and nominations ==
Year	Award	Category	Nominated work	Result
1990	David di Donatello	Best Supporting Actress	Little Misunderstandings	Won
1990	Ciak d'Oro	Best Supporting Actress	Little Misunderstandings	Nominated
1990	Nastro d'Argento	Best Supporting Actress	Little Misunderstandings	Won
1991	David di Donatello	Best Actress	Italia-Germania 4-3	Nominated
1994	Nastro d'Argento	Best Actress	Who Wants to Kill Sara?	Nominated
