= Pasinetti =

Pasinetti is a surname. Notable people with the surname include:

- Andrea Pasinetti, American executive
- Antonio Pasinetti (1863–1940), Italian painter
- Francesco Pasinetti (1911–1949), Italian film director and screenwriter
- Giulio Maria Pasinetti, Italian expatriate neurologist
- Luigi Pasinetti (1930–2023), Italian economist
- P. M. Pasinetti (1913–2006), Italian expatriate novelist, professor and journalist
- Pamela Pasinetti (born 1993), Thai-Italian model and beauty pageant titleholder
