= Tom Gallop =

American actor

- Education: University of Michigan, Ann Arbor (BA); New York University (MFA)

Tom Gallop is an American actor. He is best known for his performance as Tom Cronin in the Bourne film franchise and for playing recurring character Rob in Will & Grace.

== Filmography ==
Film
Year	Title	Role	Notes
1991	Where the Night Begins	Irving	
1993	The Contenders	Ivo Popescu	
1996	Jerry Maguire	Ben	
1997	Always Say Goodbye	Irritated Groom	
1998	Mercury Rising	Medic	
2001	A.I. Artificial Intelligence	Supernerd	
2001	It Is What It Is	Ty Weber	
2004	The Bourne Supremacy	Special Agent Tom Cronin	
2007	The Bourne Ultimatum	Special Agent Tom Cronin	
2014	Not Safe for Work	Roger Crawford	
2015	Insidious: Chapter 3	Dr. Henderson	
2015	Baby, Baby, Baby	Jam Body Wash Announcer	

Television
Year	Title	Role	Notes
1995-1996	Hudson Street	Officer R. Regelski	22 episodes
1996	Seinfeld	Alan Mercer	Episode: "The Andrea Doria"
1997	Cybill	Harvey	Episode: "Like Family"
1998-2000	Rude Awakening	Jerry Frank	8 episodes
1998-2006	Will & Grace	Rob	17 episodes
1999	ER	Dr. Roger Julian	3 episodes
1999	The X-Files	Win Shroeder	Episode: "Arcadia"
2011	Burn Notice	Kevin Skyler	Episode: "Better Halves"
2011	American Horror Story	Mr. Carmichael	Episode: "Piggy Piggy"
2012	Bones	Gavin Carmichael	Episode: "The Partners in the Divorce"
2015	The Mentalist	Charlie McInnis	Episode: "Little Yellow House"
2018	Lucifer	Rohan	Episode: "Let Pinhead Sing"
