= Italia-Germania 4-3 =

- Directed by: Andrea Barzini
- Starring: Massimo Ghini
- Cinematography: Enzo Ghinassi
- Release date: 1990
- Country: Italy
- Language: Italian

Italia-Germania 4-3 is a 1990 Italian comedy film directed by Andrea Barzini. The title is inspired by the semi-finals of the 1970 FIFA World Cup.

== Cast ==
- Massimo Ghini as Federico
- Giuseppe Cederna as Antonio
- Fabrizio Bentivoglio as Francesco
- Nancy Brilli as Giulia
- Emanuela Pacotto as Martina
