= Compagni di scuola =

1988 film

- Theatrical release poster by Renato Casaro
- Directed by: Carlo Verdone
- Written by: Carlo Verdone; Leonardo Benvenuti; Piero De Bernardi
- Produced by: Mario Cecchi Gori; Vittorio Cecchi Gori
- Starring: Carlo Verdone; Alessandro Benvenuti; Nancy Brilli; Athina Cenci; Maurizio Ferrini; Massimo Ghini; Natasha Hovey; Luisa Maneri; Piero Natoli; Eleonora Giorgi; Christian De Sica
- Cinematography: Danilo Desideri
- Edited by: Antonio Siciliano
- Production company: Cecchi Gori Group
- Distributed by: Columbia Tri-Star Films Italia
- Release date: 21 December 1988
- Running time: 120 minutes
- Country: Italy
- Language: Italian

Compagni di scuola is a 1988 Italian comedy-drama film directed by and starring Carlo Verdone. It was shown as part of a retrospective on Italian comedy at the 67th Venice International Film Festival.

== Plot ==
Federica Polidori, a charming thirty-five-year-old, throws a party with her former high school classmates at her luxurious villa near Rome. The reunion quickly takes a melancholic turn: many of the former classmates reveal their frustrations and the failures life has brought them in the fifteen years since graduating high school; their personal stories intertwine over the course of the party.

During the party, his classmates discover Ruffolo's affair with his student Cristina. Valenzani pressures him to bring his young lover to the party, while Maria Rita suggests he leave his wife, who is making him unhappy. While Ruffolo goes to leave his wife Cinzia, Valenzani abuses Cristina.

Meanwhile, Ciardulli discovers that Santolamazza isn't actually paralyzed after a car accident, but that it was a prank planned by him and Lepore. So, he organizes a counter-prank on Santolamazza, causing an accident that, in addition to exposing him, will cause him to suffer various injuries.

Upon his return, Ruffolo discovers that Valenzani has raped Cristina and attacks him. The politician is saved by his escort and, to the scorn of his other friends, leaves, vowing to ruin Ruffolo's career. Maria Rita escorts Cristina home, where she decides to leave both Ruffolo and the school.

At dawn, only a few of the classmates remain, and Federica reveals to them that her lover has left her, and that the check she wrote to Bruno is therefore unpaid (this statement will lead Ciardulli to believe that, probably, she was the one who stole the money from Finocchiaro). She also reveals that the party was her last chance to do something nice at her ex's villa, from which she was evicted. Attenni suggests she can go away with him, but she will accept Gloria's hospitality in exchange for help with the baby.

Before leaving, Attenni takes a group photo with the few remaining members, the "best" of the group. As his former schoolmates walk away, Ruffolo reflects on his shattered life, indulging in a liberating cigarette.

== Cast ==
- Carlo Verdone as Piero Ruffolo, a literature teacher at a private high school. He is oppressed by his vulgar and annoying wife Cinzia and her father. Beset by misfortune, he endures all sorts of troubles throughout the day and is tormented by his overly jealous wife over the phone. He has an affair with his young student Cristina.
- Nancy Brilli as Federica Polidori, who hosts the party at her villa, where she lives supported by a wealthy, elderly lover. A melancholic and elegant woman, she finds great joy in reuniting with her former schoolmates and is very helpful to them, as when she lends her car to Ruffolo or when she writes a large check to Ciardulli.
- Christian De Sica as Bruno Ciardulli, aka Tony Brando (or Mike Foster), a failed singer burdened by debts. Hopelessly immature, he spends the whole evening trying to gather money or help from his ex-companions, going so far as to humiliate himself in front of everyone by begging on his knees.
- Angelo Bernabucci as Walter Finocchiaro, a stereotype of the Roman nouveau riche. Vulgar and boastful, he made his fortune through the wholesale meat trade; he demeans his former mates with humiliating jokes and is the victim of a theft during the party.
- Massimo Ghini as Mauro Valenzani, a well-known politician. He shows up at the reunion accompanied by his security detail and proves to be cynical, cruel, and a cocaine addict.
- Eleonora Giorgi as Valeria Donati, a charming journalist and Luca's ex-wife. As soon as she sees him again at the party, she wants to leave, but Federica convinces her to stay. During the course of the party, she will end up getting closer to her ex-husband again.
- Athina Cenci as Maria Rita Amoroso, a melancholic psychologist. She is extremely devoted to her work and throughout the party she tries to solve her friends' problems, who however do not care about hers.
- Natasha Hovey as Cristina, Ruffolo's young student and his lover.
- Maurizio Ferrini as Armando Lepore, a gynecologist. He organizes a cruel prank on his classmates and pretends to take care of Santolamazza, who pretends to be disabled.
- Alessandro Benvenuti as Lino Santolamazza, a magistrate. He pretends to be severely disabled after a serious car accident to play a prank on his classmates.
- Fabio Traversa as Piermaria Fabris. Introverted and completely changed in appearance, so much so as to be unrecognizable, he becomes the butt of ridicule and harsh jokes from many of his former classmates. He will be the first to leave the party after yet another round of taunting from his old classmates.
- Luigi Petrucci as Ottavio Postiglione. The stereotype of a nerd, he is a Southerner transplanted to the North for work. Extremely talkative, he is therefore avoided with various excuses by his former classmates, who even end up drugging him.
- Piero Natoli as Luca Guglielmi, a cartoonist, abandoned by his wife Valeria because of his immaturity.
- Luisa Maneri as Gloria Montanari, an unhappy single mother who brings her baby to the party.
- Isa Gallinelli as Jolanda Scarpellini, Valeria's unmarried friend, to whom she is morbidly attached. Touchy and bitter, especially toward Luca, who is guilty of wanting to get back together with Valeria, she is exploited and mocked throughout the evening and soon leaves the party.
- Giusi Cataldo as Margherita Serafini. Married to a jealous Carabinieri captain of Sicilian origin, she realizes that her feelings for Toscani are still alive, and before leaving, she kisses him, only to give in to fear.
- Gianluca Favilla as Margherita's husband.
- Giovanni Vettorazzo as Francesco Toscani, a bachelor, the one who has improved his physical appearance the most over the years. He has been in love with Margherita since school, and rekindles a brief relationship with her.
- Carmela Vincenti as Gioia Savastano, the class's wit. She hides a deep sadness and will reveal to Gloria that she is sterile.
- Silvio Vannucci as Giulio Attenni, an accountant, separated from his wife and unrequited lover of Federica since school years.
- Gianni Musy as Piero's father in law.
- Serena Bennato as Cinzia, Piero's wife.
