= Everybody's Fine (1990 film) =

- Italian: Stanno tutti bene
- Directed by: Giuseppe Tornatore
- Written by: Massimo De Rita; Tonino Guerra; Giuseppe Tornatore
- Produced by: Angelo Rizzoli Jr. Mario Cotone (executive producer)
- Starring: Marcello Mastroianni; Valeria Cavalli; Norma Martelli; Giacomo Civiletti; Marino Cenna; Roberto Nobile; Sylvie Fennec; Christopher Thompson; Salvatore Cascio
- Cinematography: Blasco Giurato
- Edited by: Mario Morra
- Music by: Ennio Morricone
- Production companies: Erre Produzioni; Les Films Ariane; TF1 Films Production; Sovereign Pictures; Silvio Berlusconi Communications
- Distributed by: Penta Distribuzione (Italy); Les Films Ariane (France)
- Release dates: 20 May 1990 (Cannes); 19 September 1990 (France)
- Running time: 125 minutes
- Countries: Italy; France
- Language: Italian

Everybody's Fine (Italian: Stanno tutti bene) is a 1990 Italian comedy-drama film directed by Giuseppe Tornatore who co-wrote the screenplay with Tonino Guerra and Massimo De Rita.

It won the Prize of the Ecumenical Jury (Giuseppe Tornatore) and was nominated for Golden Palm (Giuseppe Tornatore) at the 1990 Cannes Film Festival. It also won the David di Donatello Awards for David Best Music (Ennio Morricone) and the Italian National Syndicate of Film Journalists for Silver Ribbon Best Original Story (Giuseppe Tornatore).

The film was remade in 2009 as Everybody's Fine with an American setting and starring Robert De Niro, and again as Everybody's Fine in 2016 in China.

== Plot ==
Matteo Scuro, a retired Sicilian bureaucrat and opera buff, has been stood up by his five adult children during the summer vacation, all of whom live in various cities on the Italian mainland with what he believes are responsible jobs. Despite their not visiting and the neighbours' criticisms, he remains optimistic, considering that his children could not come because they are too busy. His children are named after popular opera characters, Tosca for Puccini's Tosca, Canio for Leoncavallo's Pagliacci, Norma for Bellini's Norma, Guglielmo for Rossini's Guglielmo Tell and Alvaro for Verdi's La forza del destino.

He decides to surprise each of them with a visit, traveling by train, and finds none of them as he imagined, with each of his children seeming to reflect the opera character after whom they were named. Matteo's train journeys take him to Naples, Rome, Florence, passing by Rimini, on the Adriatic coast, and to Milan and Turin to search for each of his children; he even spends one night on the streets among the homeless. Before his arrival at each of their homes, each of his grown children scramble to put on a façade to cover up their personal failings: One daughter's ex-husband temporarily moves back in with her and their child. A son who lost his University professorship temporarily moves back into his old office. Another daughter hides the fact that she works as a lingerie model, etc. Finally, after visiting all his children, Scuro returns to Sicily, visits his wife's grave, and reports to her with irony that their children are all fine.

== Cast ==
- Marcello Mastroianni: Matteo Scuro
- Michèle Morgan: Woman in train
- Valeria Cavalli: Tosca
- Marino Cenna: Canio
- Norma Martelli: Norma
- Roberto Nobile: Guglielmo
- Salvatore Cascio: Alvaro enfant

== Reception ==
On review aggregator website Rotten Tomatoes, the film holds an approval rating of 67% based on 9 reviews, with an average rating of 6.5/10.
