= Ilaria Occhini =

Italian actress (1934–2019)

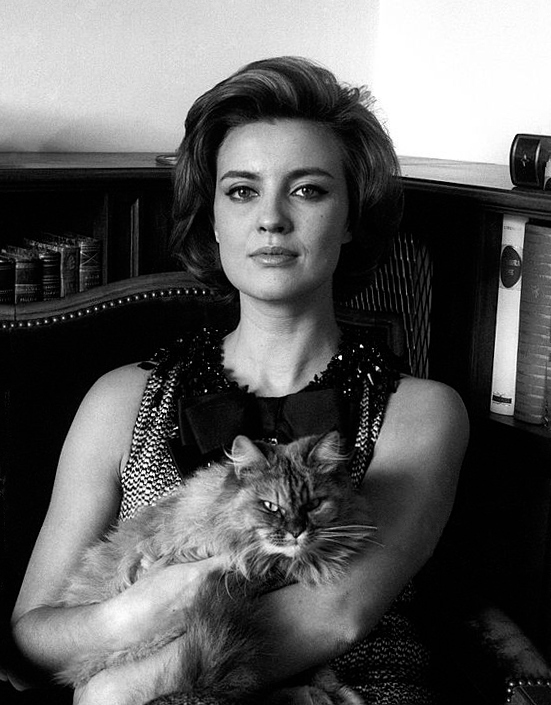
- Occhini in Rome in 1965
- Born: 28 March 1934; Florence, Kingdom of Italy
- Died: 20 July 2019 (aged 85); Florence, Italy
- Occupation: Actress
- Years active: 1954–2019

Ilaria Occhini (28 March 1934 – 20 July 2019) was an Italian stage, television and film actress. She appeared in more than 30 films.

== Life and career ==
Born in Florence, niece and daughter of novelists, Occhini started her film career at 19 with the Luciano Emmer's comedy film Terza Liceo with the stage name Isabella Redi, then attended the Accademia d'Arte Drammatica in Rome, graduating in 1957. The same year she came back to acting with Mario Monicelli's Il medico e lo stregone, and at the same time she debuted on stage with Luchino Visconti's La ragazza delle smirne and had her first leading role in the Anton Giulio Majano's TV series Jane Eyre. In 1959 she appeared in the television adaptation The Vicar of Wakefield.

Her mother, Gioconda Papini (1910-1954), was one of the two daughters of writer Giovanni Papini and his wife Giacinta Giovagnoli, the other being writer Viola Paszkowski Papini. Her father was writer, art historian and journalist Barna Occhini (pseudonym of Carlo Luigi Occhini) (1905-1978), the son of senator Pier Ludovico Occhini and his wife Maria Luisa Tettamanzi.

Occhini obtained her major successes on stage, working several times with Luchino Visconti, then joining the Piccolo Teatro of Naples, where she received large critical appreciation by interpreting classical and contemporary authors. She was also a constant presence in RAI television series, and also starred in many films, but rarely in leading roles.

In 1992 Occhini won the Nastro d'Argento for best supporting role for her performance in Benvenuti in Casa Gori. In 2008 she was awarded Best Actress at the Locarno International Film Festival for her role in Black Sea. In 2010 she won a David di Donatello for Best Supporting Actress for her role in Loose Cannons; the same year she was awarded a special Nastro d'Argento for her career.

She married screenwriter and author Raffaele La Capria, with whom she had a daughter, Alexandra.

== Selected filmography ==
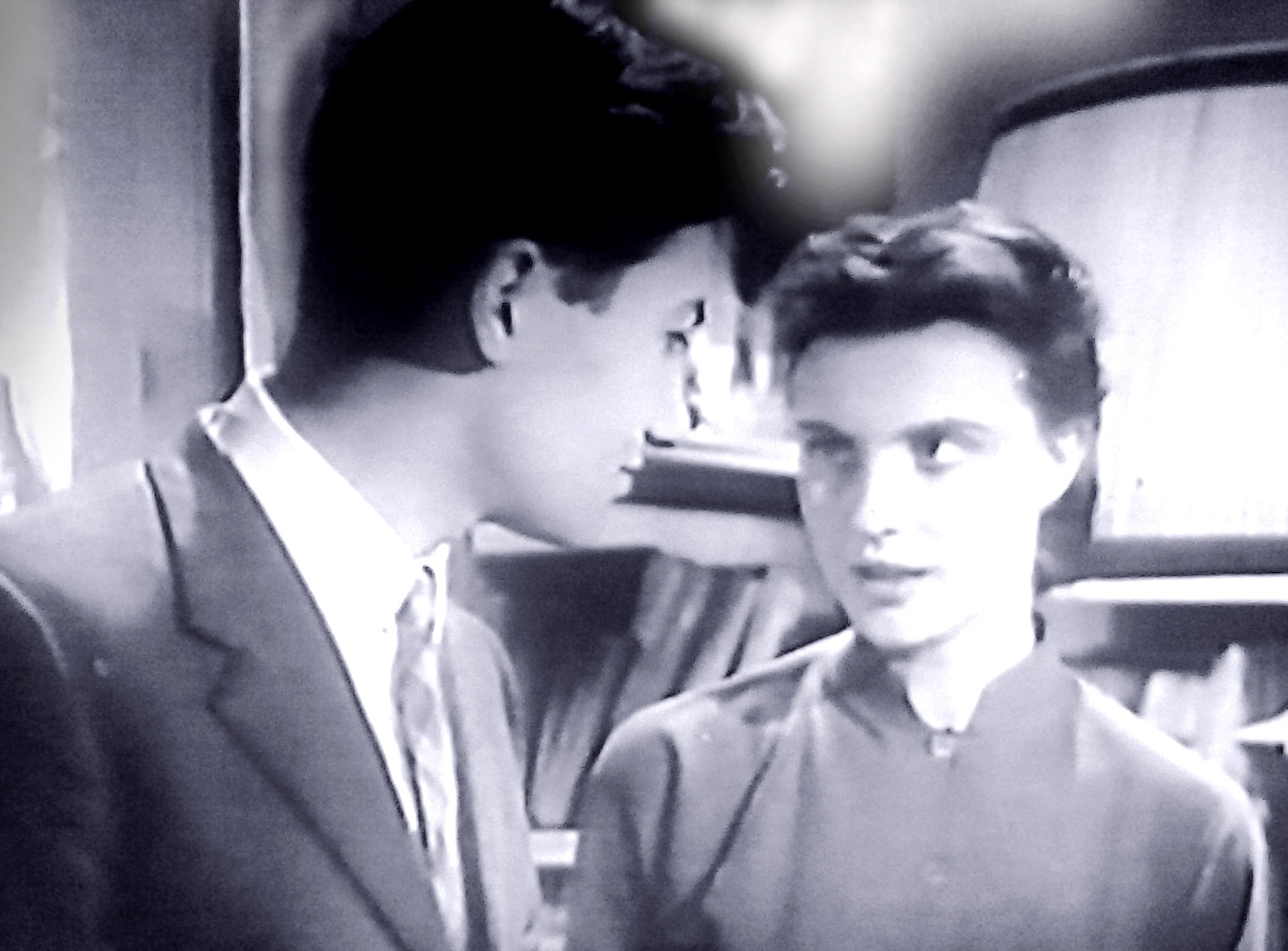
Ferdinando Cappabianca and Ilaria Occhini in High School

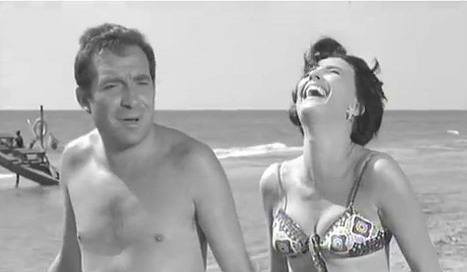
Ugo Tognazzi and Ilaria Occhini in His Women

- High School (1954)
- Doctor and the Healer (1957)
- The Dragon's Blood (1957)
- Carthage in Flames (1960)
- His Women (1961)
- Damon and Pythias (1962)
- The Shortest Day (1962)
- The Betrothed (1964)
- The Tramplers (1965)
- I complessi (1965)
- The Man Who Laughs (1966)
- Brigade antigangs (1966)
- Almost a Man (1966)
- Hearth Fires (1972)
- Two Men in Town (1973)
- Welcome to Home Gori (1990)
- Return to Home Gori (1996)
- Tomorrow (2001)
- Black Sea (2008)
- Loose Cannons (2010)
- All at Sea (2011)
- A Perfect Family (2012)
