= The Game Bag =

- Directed by: Maurizio Zaccaro
- Written by: Lara Fremder; Marco Bechis; Gigi Riva; Maurizio Zaccaro; Umberto Contarello
- Produced by: Giovanni Di Clemente
- Cinematography: Blasco Giurato
- Music by: Pino Donaggio
- Release date: 1997
- Running time: 94 minutes
- Language: Italian

The Game Bag (Italian: Il carniere) is a 1997 Italian war drama film directed by Maurizio Zaccaro.

For his performance Leo Gullotta won the David di Donatello for best supporting actor.

== Plot ==
In late summer 1991, three Italians reach a hunting reserve in Croatia with a station wagon. They go to deer, but, unaware of what's in store for months, they do not decipher the enigmatic signs that surround them. One of the three is suddenly wounded in the knee by a bullet of unknown provenance, and they end up in a hotel targeted by snipers night and day.

== Cast ==
- Massimo Ghini: Renzo
- Paraskeva Djukelova: Rada
- Antonio Catania: Paolo
- Leo Gullotta: Carlo
- Yavor Milushev: Boris
- Giorgio Tirabassi
