= Maurizio Zaccaro =

Italian film director

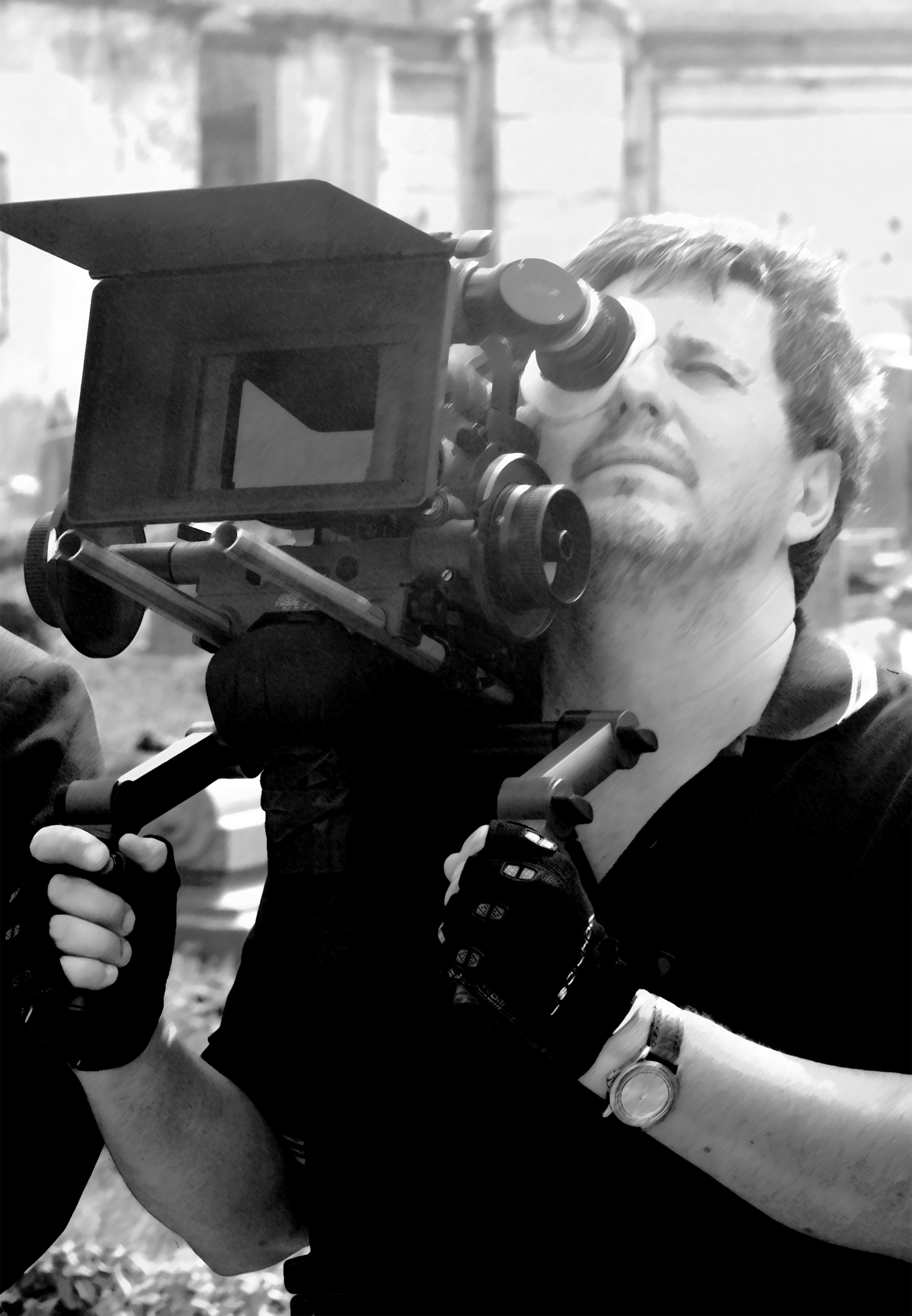
- Born: 8 May 1952 (age 74); Milan, Italy
- Occupations: director cinematographer editor screenwriter

Maurizio Zaccaro (born 8 May 1952 in Milan, Italy) is an Italian film director, cinematographer, film editor, and screenwriter.

== Biography ==
Maurizio Zaccaro was born in Milan. After ending his study at the Milan Film School (1977) he took on work in Ermanno Olmi Film Factory and at the same time developed several short movies. But with the debut of his movie Where the Night Begins (1991), a horror film, he received the David di Donatello Award for Best New Director and stepped into the business of film-making.

This first movie, entirely shot in United States, is also one of the few that he did not write himself.

Two years later his second movie The Valley of Stone (1992) followed, though not released abroad. This film was the cinematographic adaptation of a novel of the Austrian writer Adalbert Stifter. Another couple of years later the outstanding Article 2 – l'Articolo 2 (1994), a movie in a style reminiscent of the movies of Italian Neorealism with an almost poetic-like atmosphere. L' Articolo 2 won the Solinas award for best screenplay. In 1996, Zaccaro made the war movie The Game Bag, which also won David di Donatello for best supporting actor, Leo Gullotta, award. Later he directed A Respectable Man (Un uomo perbene) (1999) a legal thriller on Enzo Tortora, a well known anchorman of Italian television. A respectable man won the Pasinetti award in Venice Film Festival 1999, another David di Donatello for best supporting actor award and a Silver Ribbon for best screenplay. Zaccaro then showed his ability to direct TV movies as well, with La missione (The Mission) (1997), Un dono semplice – A simple gift (2000), Cuore – Heart (2001), and I ragazzi della via Pal (The boys of St. Paul street) (2003). Some others of his most successful TV films were Al di là delle frontiere – Beyond borders (2004), Mafalda di Savoia – Mafalda of Savoy (2005), O Professore – The professor (2006), "Lo smemoreato di collegno – The Forgetter" and "Le ragazze dello swing – The queens of swing" awarded in Montecarlo and Shanghai film Festival as best director.

“In writing, preparing, and shooting a film, I’m certain of one thing: I can’t please everyone with each decision I make. This certainty makes me feel free and easy, like the floating feather in Forrest Gump. So, what counts, is only the quality of my work.” Maurizio Zaccaro - Press conference, 66th Venice Film Festival (2009)

== Films ==
director

- 1989: In coda della coda
- 1991: Where the Night Begins
- 1992: The Valley of Stone aka Kalkstein
- 1994: L'articolo 2
- 1996: Testa matta
- 1997: The Game Bag
- 1998: La missione (TV)
- 1999: Rock Crystal (TV)
- 1999: A Respectable Man
- 2000: Un dono semplice (TV)
- 2001: Cuore miniseries
- 2003: I ragazzi della via Pál (TV)
- 2004: Al di là delle frontiere miniseries
- 2005: Il bell'Antonio miniseries
- 2006: Mafalda di Savoia miniseries
- 2008: Il bambino della domenica miniseries
- 2008: O professore (TV)
- 2009: Lo smemorato di Collegno (TV)
- 2009: Il piccolo
- 2010: Le ragazze dello swing (TV)
- 2011: Un foglio bianco
- 2012: A testa alta (TV)
- 2013: adelante petrolersos
- 2014: Il sindaco pescatore
- 2016: La felicità umana - Human happiness

Screenplay

- 1989: In coda della coda
- 1994: L'articolo 2
- 1996: Cervellini fritti impanati
- 1997: The Game Bag
- 1999: A Respectable Man
- 1999: Rock Crystal (TV)
- 2003: I ragazzi della via Pál (TV)
- 2006: Mafalda di Savoia miniseries
- 2009: Lo smemorato di Collegno (TV)
- 2009: Il piccolo
- 2010: Le ragazze dello swing

Cinematographer

- 1983: À la poursuite de l'étoile
- 1985: Mediatori e carrozze
- 1987: Lunga vita alla signora!
- 2009: Il piccolo

Film editor

- 1989: Maicol
- 1991: L'attesa

Assistant director

- 2009: Terra madre
