= Andrea Pasinetti =

- Occupations: Founder of Kira Learning and founder and former CEO of Teach For China

Andrea Pasinetti is an American entrepreneur and software engineer. He is the co-founder and CEO of Kira Learning, an Education Technology company. Pasinetti is also a Co-founder of VIAVIA, a video-first e-commerce platform. Previously he founded and was CEO of Teach For China, one of the most influential nonprofit organizations in China.

Pasinetti attended Trinity School in New York and has an undergraduate degree from Princeton University. He received an MBA from Stanford University’s Graduate School of Business (GSB), and is enrolled in Stanford’s M.S. in Computer Science program. In 2008 Pasinetti dropped out of Princeton University to found Teach For China (previously China Education Initiative), but later graduated in 2018.

== Awards ==
Pasinetti was recognized in 2011 by ChinaNewsweek magazine as the most influential foreigner working in China. He was included in Foreign Policy Magazine’s inaugural Pacific Power Index as one of “50 people sharing the U.S.-China relationship.” In 2014 Pasinetti was recognized by the World Economic Forum (WEF) as a Young Global Leader (YGL).

== Personal ==
Pasinetti is fluent in Mandarin Chinese, and Italian and has given interviews on Chinese television. He is married to former CNBC news anchor Sixuan Li. The two live in Los Angeles with their three dogs, Alma, Archie, and Hugo.
