= Albergo Roma =

- Directed by: Ugo Chiti
- Cinematography: Blasco Giurato
- Music by: Marco Baraldi
- Release date: 1996
- Country: Italy
- Language: Italian

Albergo Roma (Hotel Rome) is a 1996 Italian comedy film directed by Ugo Chiti. It was screened at the 53rd Venice International Film Festival, in which Chiti won the Kodak Award.

For her performance Lucia Poli won a Nastro d'Argento for best supporting actress.

== Cast ==
- Alessandro Benvenuti: Tonchio
- Deborah Caprioglio: Ginecriste
- Maria Cristina Maccà : Peppina
- Claudio Bisio: Danilo Giorgini
- Tchéky Karyo: Federale Apolloni
- Giorgio Panariello: Maresciallo
- Cecilia Dazzi: Milenina
- Carlo Monni: Don Urbano
- Alessandra Acciai: Ottavia
- Davide Bechini: Dr. Goffredo
- Lucia Poli: Viola La Sarta
- Gianna Giachetti: Mrs. Olimpia
- Novello Novelli: Senior saxophone player
- Massimo Ceccherini: gang member
- Alfiero Toppetti: gang member
- Laura Trotter: Miss Mirella Salimbeni
- Lily Tirinnanzi:Mrs. Salimbeni
- Barbara Enrichi:Adina Giorgini
