= The Four Days of Naples (film) =

- Italian film poster
- Directed by: Nanni Loy
- Written by: Carlo Bernari; Pasquale Festa Campanile; Massimo Franciosa; Nanni Loy; Vasco Pratolini
- Produced by: Goffredo Lombardo
- Starring: Regina Bianchi; Aldo Giuffrè
- Cinematography: Marcello Gatti
- Edited by: Ruggero Mastroianni
- Music by: Carlo Rustichelli
- Distributed by: Metro Goldwyn Mayer in United States/Titanus in Italy
- Release dates: 16 November 1962; 19 March 1963
- Running time: 120 minutes
- Country: Italy
- Language: Italian
- Budget: $800,000
- Box office: $2 million (Italy)

The Four Days of Naples (Italian: Le quattro giornate di Napoli) is a 1962 Italian film, directed by Nanni Loy and set during the uprising (28 September 1943 to 1 October 1943) which gives its name. It stars Regina Bianchi, Aldo Giuffrè, Lea Massari, Jean Sorel, Franco Sportelli, Charles Belmont, Gian Maria Volonté and Frank Wolff.

The film won the Nastro d'Argento for Best Director, and was nominated for the Academy Awards for Best Foreign Language Film and Best Original Screenplay, and a BAFTA Award for Best Film. At the 3rd Moscow International Film Festival in 1963, the film was awarded with the FIPRESCI Prize.

== Plot ==
Following the truce between Italy and the Allies in World War II, German forces occupy Naples and begin to shoot resisters, demolish port facilities and round up young men to be transported to Germany as forced labour. The city's population, aware that Allied forces are close and determined to disrupt the deportations, revolt against the Germans following the public execution of an Italian sailor. This sparks a spontaneous insurrection among the Neapolitans who despite their limited arms and organization, forced the German forces to retreat from the city just before Allied troops arrive by advancing from the Salerno beachhead.

== Cast ==
- Regina Bianchi as Concetta Capuozzo (as Régina Bianchi)
- Aldo Giuffrè as Pitrella
- Lea Massari as Maria
- Jean Sorel as sailor livornese
- Franco Sportelli as Prof. Rosati
- Charles Belmont as Sailor
- Gian Maria Volonté as captain Royal Italian Army
- Frank Wolff as Salvatore
- Luigi De Filippo as Cicillo
- Pupella Maggio as Arturo's Mother
- Georges Wilson as Reformatory Director
- Raffaele Barbato as Ajello
- Rosalia Maggio as concerned woman
- Enzo Cannavale as partisan
- Domenico Formato as Gennaro Capuozzo

== Production ==
The film was shot on location in the streets of Naples where the events actually happened. The film's producers emphatically stated that the "stars" of the film are "the people of Naples" and in tribute to them and to those that died, the professional cast of actors agreed to omit their names from the film's credits.

== Reception ==
The Four Days of Naples has an approval rating of 80% on review aggregator website Rotten Tomatoes, based on 5 reviews, and an average rating of 7.5/10.

== See also ==
- List of submissions to the 35th Academy Awards for Best Foreign Language Film
- List of Italian submissions for the Academy Award for Best Foreign Language Film
