= Camerieri =

- Directed by: Leone Pompucci
- Written by: Leone Pompucci, Filippo Pichi, Paolo Rossi
- Produced by: Vittorio Cecchi Gori, Mario Cecchi Gori
- Starring: Diego Abatantuono, Paolo Villaggio, Marco Messeri, Ciccio Ingrassia
- Cinematography: Massimo Pau
- Edited by: Mauro Bonanni
- Music by: Carlo Di Blasi; Paolo Rossi
- Release date: 1995
- Running time: 96 min
- Country: Italy
- Language: Italian

Camerieri (Waiters) is a 1995 Italian comedy-drama film written and directed by Leone Pompucci. The film won two Silver Ribbons, for best screenplay and best supporting actress (to Regina Bianchi).

== Plot summary ==
In a lonely restaurant on the beach, four waiters and the cook along with his aide from the Philippines are left alone by their senior boss (Ciccio Ingrassia) who goes to the hospital for a sudden illness, on the last day before selling the place to dysfunctional family of a rich furniture factory owner. The new management is still undecided on whether to keep the place as it is or convert the location into further expansion of his main business, firing everybody. The fate of the staff depends on this decision, as they are all barely getting by with this job. They suffer from gambling addiction, mental problems, immigration issues, and inexperience. The new owner Salvatore Azzaro, an old Roman hick, has decided to put them to a test by throwing a party for a wedding anniversary.

During the long lunch, customers and waiters show their character flaws and the situation is repeatedly saved from the brink of collapse. The cook has a quarrel with the old chief waiter and suddenly refuses to help. His foreign aide drinks too much and damages the cake on the way back from the pastry shop. One of the waiters is repeatedly humiliated for his aborted career as a professional football player and constantly strives to get money through new loans and even petty thief in order to feed his gambling addiction and keep a loan shark at bay. The head waiter gets fired after boasting his long career and experience in the service of many celebrities while also getting exposed for the loss of his own restaurant in a card game. Another barely literate, homeless waiter is recognized as a previously successful but failed accordion player. The young and inexperienced nephew of the head waiter struggles to cope with his first job.

The customers as well show all their vices, contradictions, and moral corruption. The new owner has invited his mistress and betrays his wife even during the celebration, and causes her breakdown in tears in front of all their friends and relatives. His younger son insults and mocks the waiters in various ways, tantalizes them about remaining employed, but also ends up humiliated in front his friends during a bet.

At the end of the day, when all appears lost and the whole staff faces termination, the sudden chance for redemption comes in the form of a joint Totocalcio win by all waiters. Unexpectedly they decide to use part of it to buy the restaurant themselves. Only the younger one however appears to also use the occasion in order to start a new life in a different career as international salesman, while the movie ends hinting at all the others still persisting in their own ways.

== Cast ==
- Paolo Villaggio: Loris Bianchi
- Diego Abatantuono: Mario Tangaro
- Marco Messeri: Agostino Rondine
- Antonio Catania: Germano
- Carlo Croccolo: Salvatore Azzaro
- Antonello Fassari: son of Azzaro
- Enrico Salimbeni: Riccardo Bianchi
- Regina Bianchi: wife of Salvatore Azzaro
- Ludovica Modugno:wife of the son of Azzaro
- Ciccio Ingrassia: Mr. Loppi
- Sandra Milo: lover of Salvatore Azzaro
- Cristina Gajoni: ospite
