= Alessandro Benvenuti =

Italian actor

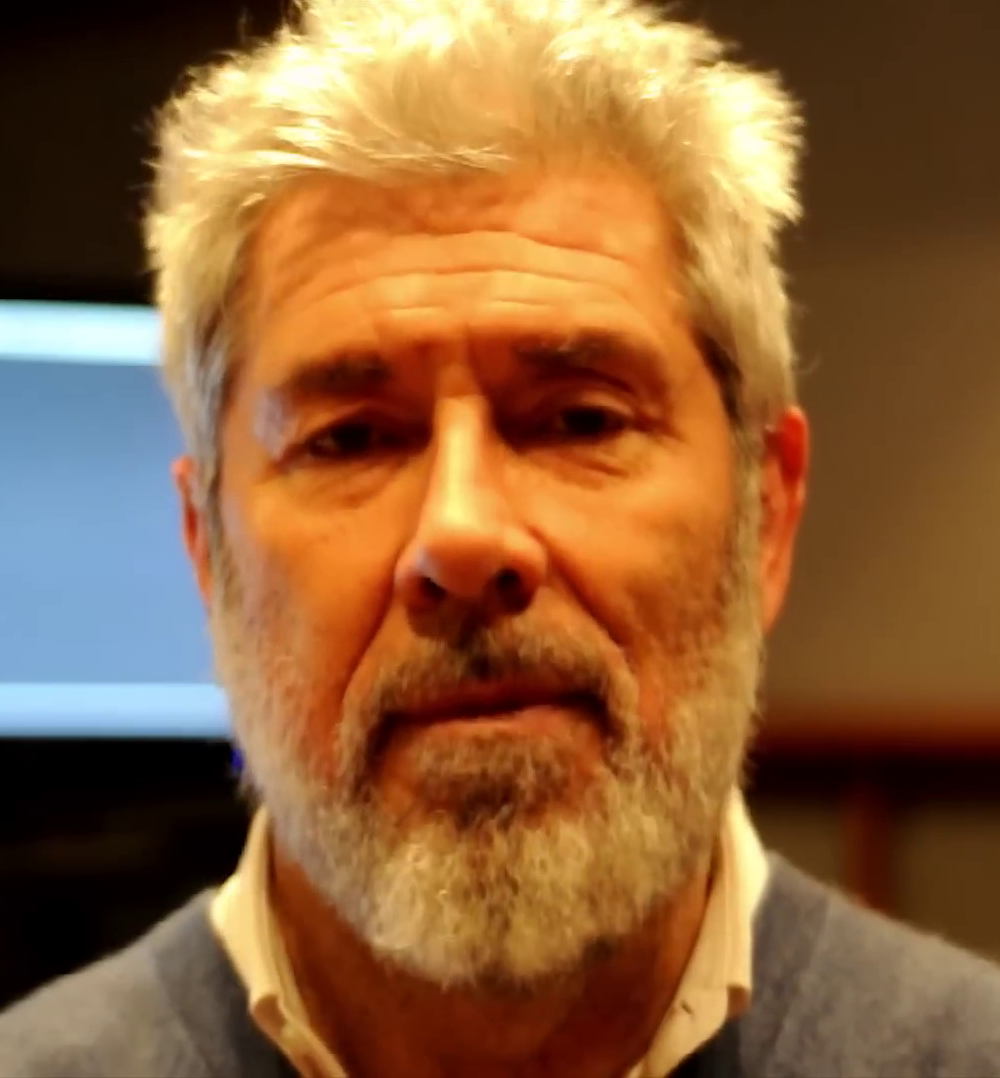
- Benvenuti in 2013
- Born: 31 January 1950 (age 76); Pelago, Italy
- Occupations: Actor; film director; screenwriter
- Years active: 1977–present
- Height: 1.90 m (6 ft 3 in)

Alessandro Benvenuti (born 31 January 1950) is an Italian actor, film director and screenwriter. He was co-founder, together with Francesco Nuti and Athina Cenci, of the comedy ensemble "GianCattivi" with whom he achieved his first successes on stage and on television. He made his film debut in West of Paperino, for which he won the 1982 Nastro d'Argento for Best New Director, therefore he started a critically appreciated career as director, screenwriter and actor of a set of original, offbeat comedies. In 1995 he won a second Nastro d'Argento for the script of the film Belle al Bar. In 1996, he received three Globi d'oro nominations for his comedy drama film Ivo the Genius in the categories best film, best actor and best director.

== Filmography ==
=== As director ===
- West of Paperino (1981)
- It Was a Dark and Stormy Night (1985)
- Welcome to Home Gori (1990)
- The Party's Over (1991)
- Cain vs. Cain (1993)
- Belle al Bar (1994)
- Ivo the Genius (1995)
- Return to Home Gori (1996)
- My Dearest Friends (1998)
- Do You Mind If I Kiss Mommy? (2003)

=== As actor ===
- West of Paperino (1981)
- It Was a Dark and Stormy Night (1985)
- Fatto su misura (1985)
- Il ragazzo del Pony Express (1986)
- Soldati - 365 all'alba (1987)
- Professione vacanze (1987) TV
- Compagni di scuola (1988)
- Welcome to Home Gori (1990)
- The Party's Over (1991)
- Cain vs. Cain (1993)
- Belle al Bar (1994)
- Sentimental Maniacs (1994)
- Ivo the Genius (1995)
- Return to Home Gori (1996)
- Albergo Roma (1996)
- My Dearest Friends (1998)
- Un colpo al cuore (2000) TV
- The Fugitive (2003)
- Do You Mind If I Kiss Mommy? (2003)
- 13 at a Table (2004)
- Caterina and her daughters (2005-2010) TV
- Concorso di colpa (2005)
- Mogli a pezzi (2008) TV
- Amici miei – Come tutto ebbe inizio (2011)
- Un fantastico via vai (2013)
- Murders at Barlume (2014) TV
