= Giuseppe Tornatore =

Italian film director and screenwriter

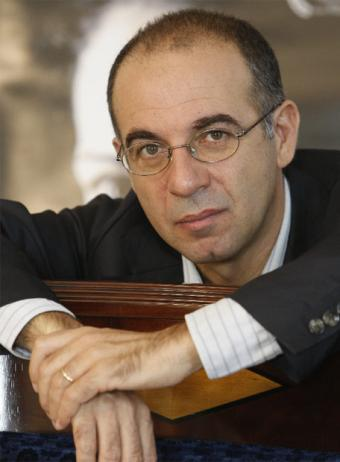
- Born: 27 May 1956 (age 69); Bagheria, Sicily, Italy
- Occupations: Film director, screenwriter
- Years active: 1985–present
- Awards: Academy Award (1990)

Giuseppe Tornatore (born 27 May 1956) is an Italian film director and screenwriter. He is considered one of the directors who brought critical acclaim back to Italian cinema. In a career spanning over 30 years he is best known for directing and writing drama films such as Everybody's Fine, The Legend of 1900, Malèna, Baarìa and The Best Offer. His most noted film is Cinema Paradiso, for which Tornatore won the Academy Award for Best Foreign Language Film. He has also directed several advertising campaigns for Dolce & Gabbana.

Tornatore is also known for his long-standing association with composer Ennio Morricone, who composed music for thirteen Tornatore feature films since 1988.

== Life and career ==
Born in Bagheria, near Palermo, Tornatore developed an interest in acting and the theatre from at least the age of 16 and put on works by Luigi Pirandello and Eduardo De Filippo.

He worked initially as a freelance photographer. Then, switching to cinema, he made his debut with Le minoranze etniche in Sicilia (The Ethnic Minorities in Sicily), a collaborative documentary film which won a Salerno Festival prize. He then worked for RAI before releasing his first full-length film,The Professor, in 1985. This evoked a positive response from audiences and critics alike and Tornatore was awarded the Silver Ribbon for best new director.

In 1988, a collaboration with producer Franco Cristaldi gave birth to Tornatore's best known screen work: Cinema Paradiso, a film narrating the life of a successful film director who has returned to his native town in Sicily for the funeral of his mentor. This obtained worldwide success and won the 1990 Academy Award for Best Foreign Language Film. Subsequently, Tornatore released several other films. In 2007 he won the Silver George for Best Director at the 29th Moscow International Film Festival for The Unknown Woman.

== Personal life ==
Tornatore describes himself as "one who does not believe and who regrets this". His brother, Francesco Tornatore, is a producer.

== Filmography ==
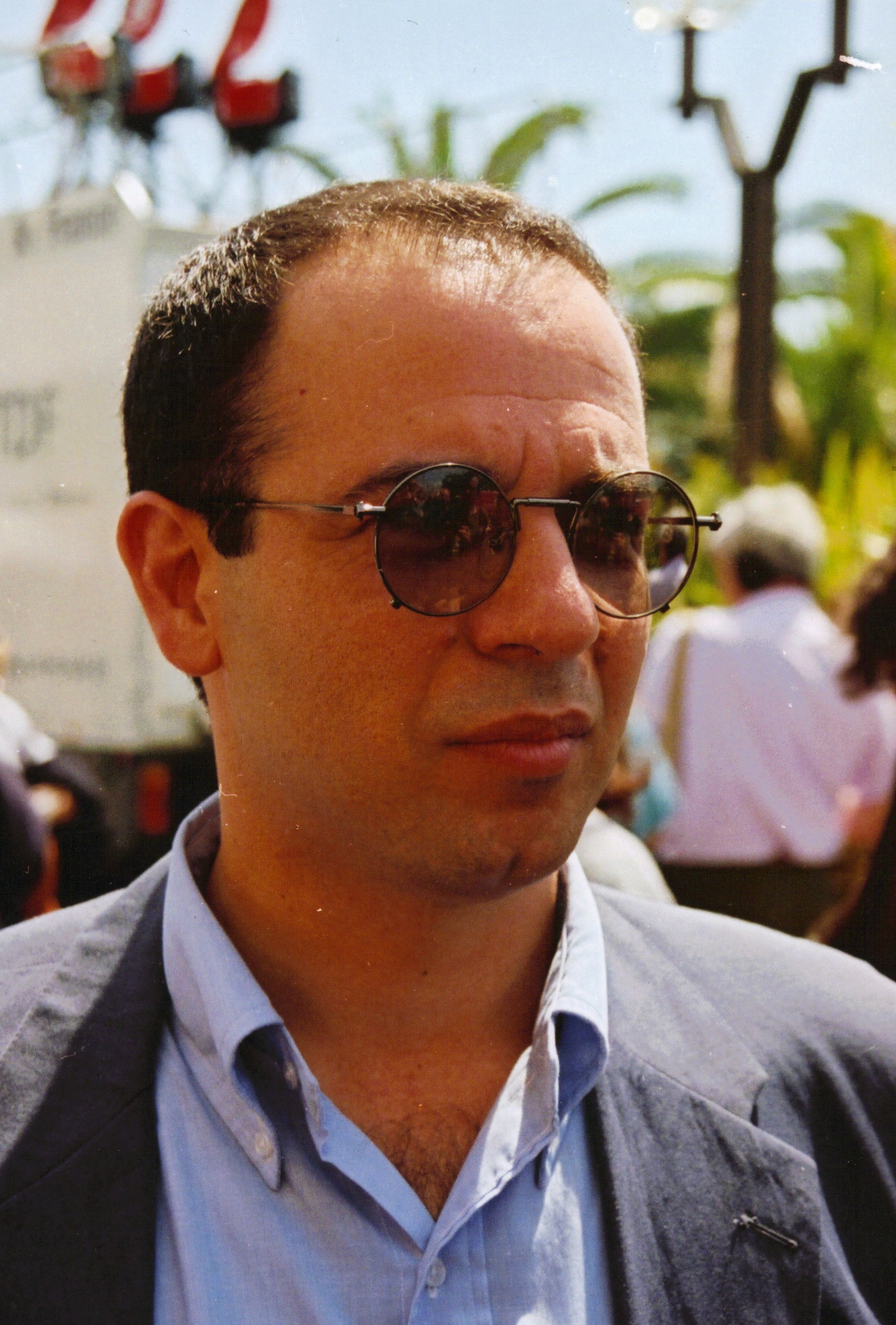
Tornatore at the 1994 Cannes Film Festival.

=== Written and directed ===
- 1986: The Professor (Il camorrista)
- 1988: Cinema Paradiso (Nuovo Cinema Paradiso)
- 1990: Everybody's Fine (Stanno tutti bene)
- 1991: Especially on Sunday (segment "Il cane blu")
- 1994: A Pure Formality (Una pura formalità)
- 1995: The Star Maker (L'uomo delle stelle)
- 1995: Lo schermo a tre punte (documentary)
- 1996: Ritratti d'autore: seconda serie (documentary)
- 1998: The Legend of 1900 (La leggenda del pianista sull'oceano)
- 2000: Malèna
- 2006: The Unknown Woman (La sconosciuta)
- 2009: Baarìa
- 2013: The Best Offer (La migliore offerta)
- 2016: The Correspondence (La corrispondenza)
- 2021: Ennio – The Maestro (documentary)
- 2025: Brunello: The Gracious Visionary (documentary)
- TBA: Cinema Paradiso – Miniseries

=== Screenplay ===
- Cento giorni a Palermo ("One Hundred Days in Palermo"), directed by Giuseppe Ferrara (1984) – Tornatore is credited under the name Peppuccio Tornatore
- The Best Offer (2013).
