= Athina Cenci =

Italian actress (born 1946)

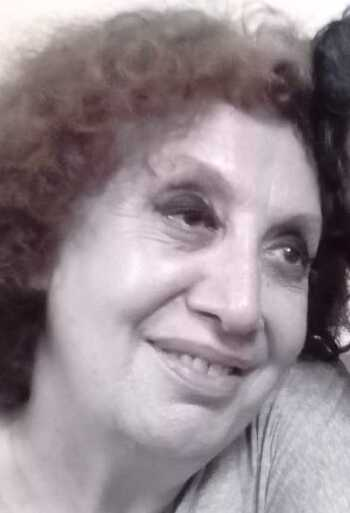
- Cenci in 2021
- Born: 13 March 1946 (age 79); Kos, Dodecanese, Kingdom of Italy (preent-day Greece)
- Occupation: Actress
- Height: 1.73 m (5 ft 8 in)

Athina Cenci (Italian pronunciation: [aˈtiːna ˈtʃɛntʃi]; born 13 March 1946) is a Greek-born Italian former actress, stand-up comedian and politician.

== Life and career ==
Born in Kos, Greece, Cenci was co-founder and member, together with Francesco Nuti and Alessandro Benvenuti, of the comedy ensemble "GianCattivi" with whom she achieved her first successes on stage and on television. She made her film debut with GianCattivi in West of Paperino (1982), then, after the group split, she started a successful solo career winning two David di Donatello for Best Supporting Actress for her performances in Mario Monicelli's Let's Hope It's a Girl and Carlo Verdone's Compagni di scuola. She later also worked with other notable directors, including Paolo and Vittorio Taviani and Ettore Scola, and was active on stage and on television, in TV-series and variety shows. In 1999 Cenci was elected with the Democrats of the Left in the city council of Florence. In 2001 she suffered a stroke that forced her to interrupt her artistic and political activities for many years. She reappeared in public in 2014 and the year after returned on stage as protagonist.
