= List of Italian films of 1985 =

A list of films produced in Italy in 1985 (see 1985 in film):

== Films ==
Title	Director	Cast	Genre	Notes
The Alcove	Joe D'Amato	Lilli Carati, Annie Belle	Erotic	
All the Fault of Paradise	Francesco Nuti	Francesco Nuti, Ornella Muti	Romantic comedy	
A me mi piace	Enrico Montesano	Enrico Montesano	comedy	
Amici miei – Atto III	Nanni Loy	Ugo Tognazzi, Gastone Moschin, Adolfo Celi, Renzo Montagnani, Bernard Blier	Comedy	
L'attenzione	Giovanni Soldati	Stefania Sandrelli, Ben Cross, Amanda Sandrelli	Romance	
Bank Clerks	Pupi Avati	Claudio Botosso, Elena Sofia Ricci	Comedy	
The Berlin Affair	Liliana Cavani	Gudrun Landgrebe, Kevin McNally, Mio Takaki	Drama	
Big Deal After 20 Years	Amanzio Todini	Marcello Mastroianni, Vittorio Gassman	Commedia all'italiana	
Blues metropolitano	Salvatore Piscicelli	Marina Suma, Ida Di Benedetto, Barbara D'Urso	Musical	
La Cage aux Folles 3: The Wedding	Georges Lautner	Michel Serrault, Ugo Tognazzi	comedy	French-Italian co-production
Casablanca, Casablanca	Francesco Nuti	Francesco Nuti, Giuliana De Sio	Comedy	
Love at First Sight	Marco Risi	Jerry Calà, Vanessa Gravina, Ricky Tognazzi	Comedy	
Commando Leopard	Antonio Margheriti	Lewis Collins, Klaus Kinski	Action	
Cut and Run	Ruggero Deodato	Lisa Blount, Leonard Mann, Willie Aames	Horror	
Demons	Lamberto Bava	Urbano Barberini, Natasha Hovey	Horror	
Il diavolo sulle colline	Vittorio Cottafavi	Urbano Barberini	Drama	
È arrivato mio fratello	Castellano & Pipolo	Renato Pozzetto	Comedy	
Fatto su misura	Francesco Laudadio	Ricky Tognazzi, Ugo Tognazzi	Comedy	
Formula for a Murder	Alberto De Martino	David Warbeck, Rossano Brazzi, Christina Nagy		
Fracchia contro Dracula	Neri Parenti	Paolo Villaggio Gigi Reder, Isabella Ferrari	—N/a	
Graduation Party	Pupi Avati	Carlo Delle Piane, Aurore Clément	Comedy-drama	
Hercules II	Luigi Cozzi	Lou Ferrigno, Milly Carlucci, Sonia Viviani	Comedy	
I Am an ESP	Sergio Corbucci	Alberto Sordi, Eleonora Brigliadori, Elsa Martinelli	Comedy	
Joan Lui	Adriano Celentano	Adriano Celentano, Claudia Mori, Marthe Keller	Musical-comedy	
Jungle Raiders	Antonio Margheriti	Christopher Connelly, Lee Van Cleef	Adventure	
Killer vs. Killers	Fernando Di Leo	Henry Silva, Dalila Di Lazzaro	—N/a	
Light Blast	Enzo G. Castellari	Erik Estrada, Ennio Girolami	Science fiction, action	
Little Flames (film)	Peter Del Monte	Valeria Golino	Drama	
Lui è peggio di me	Enrico Oldoini	Adriano Celentano, Renato Pozzetto	Comedy	
Macaroni	Ettore Scola	Jack Lemmon, Marcello Mastroianni	Comedy	
Madman at War	Dino Risi	Coluche, Beppe Grillo, Bernard Blier, Fabio Testi	Comedy	
Man Hunt	Fabrizio De Angelis	Ethan Wayne, Henry Silva		
Mamma Ebe	Carlo Lizzani	Berta D. Domínguez, Alessandro Haber, Stefania Sandrelli	Drama	
The Mass Is Ended	Nanni Moretti	Nanni Moretti, Ferruccio De Ceresa	Comedy	
Massacre in Dinosaur Valley	Michele Massimo Tarantini	Michael Sopkiw	Horror	
Mezzo destro mezzo sinistro - 2 calciatori senza pallone	Sergio Martino	Gigi & Andrea, Milena Vukotic, Leo Gullotta, Isabel Russinova	Comedy	
Miami Supercops	Bruno Corbucci	Terence Hill, Bud Spencer	Action-comedy	
Miranda	Tinto Brass	Serena Grandi, Andrea Occhipinti	erotic	
Il mistero di Bellavista	Luciano De Crescenzo	Marina Confalone, Luciano De Crescenzo	Comedy	
My Dearest Son	Valentino Orsini	Ben Gazzara, Sergio Rubini, Valeria Golino, Mariangela Melato	Drama	
Nothing Underneath	Carlo Vanzina	Renée Simonsen, Donald Pleasence	Giallo	
The Pleasure	Joe D'Amato	Lilli Carati, Laura Gemser	Erotic	
Pizza Connection	Damiano Damiani	Michele Placido, Ida Di Benedetto	Crime	
Phenomena	Dario Argento	Jennifer Connelly, Daria Nicolodi, Donald Pleasence	Horror	
I pompieri	Neri Parenti	Paolo Villaggio, Lino Banfi, Massimo Boldi	Comedy	
Power of Evil	Krzysztof Zanussi	Benjamin Völz, Vittorio Gassman, Marie-Christine Barrault	Drama	
The Repenter	Pasquale Squitieri	Tony Musante, Franco Nero, Max von Sydow, Erik Estrada	Crime	
Savage Island	Nicholas Beardsley	Anthony Steffen, Ajita Wilson	Action	
Scandalous Gilda	Gabriele Lavia	Monica Guerritore, Gabriele Lavia	erotic	
Secrets Secrets	Giuseppe Bertolucci	Gabriele Lavia, Lina Sastri, Lea Massari	Drama	
Tex and the Lord of the Deep	Duccio Tessari	Giuliano Gemma, William Berger	Western	
The Trap	Giuseppe Patroni Griffi	Laura Antonelli, Tony Musante, Florinda Bolkan		
The Two Lives of Mattia Pascal	Mario Monicelli	Marcello Mastroianni, Senta Berger, Flavio Bucci, Laura Morante	Comedy-drama	
Warbus	Ferdinando Baldi	Daniel Stephen, Romano Kristoff	Action	
White Slave	Mario Gariazzo	Elvire Audray, Rik Battaglia	Horror	
Woman of Wonders	Vittorio Cottafavi	Ben Gazzara, Lina Sastri, Claudia Cardinale	Drama	
