= List of Italian films of 1986 =

A list of films produced in Italy in 1986 (see 1986 in film):

Title	Director	Cast	Genre	Notes
1986
7 chili in 7 giorni	Luca Verdone	Carlo Verdone, Renato Pozzetto	comedy	
Anemia	Alberto Abruzese, Achille Pisanti	Hanns Zichler	—N/a	
The Beekeeper	Theodoros Angelopoulos	Marcello Mastroianni, Serge Reggiani	Drama	Greek-Italian co-production
Il Bi e il Ba	Maurizio Nichetti	Nino Frassica, Leo Gullotta, Marco Messeri	comedy	
Blood Ties	Giacomo Battiato	Brad Davis, Tony Lo Bianco, Vincent Spano, Barbara De Rossi	crime	Italian-American co-production
La bonne	Salvatore Samperi	Florence Guérin	erotic	
The Bride Was Beautiful	Pál Gábor	Ángela Molina, Massimo Ghini, Stefania Sandrelli	Drama	
Il burbero	Castellano & Pipolo	Adriano Celentano, Debra Feuer	comedy	
Camorra (A Story of Streets, Women and Crime)	Lina Wertmüller	Ángela Molina, Harvey Keitel	crime	Entered into the 36th Berlin International Film Festival
Il Camorrista (The Professor)	Giuseppe Tornatore	Ben Gazzara, Laura del Sol, Leo Gullotta, Franco Interlenghi	Crime-Drama	Tornatore's debut. Nastro d'Argento best new director
La Casa del Buon Ritorno	Beppe Cino	Amanda Sandrelli	—N/a	
Demons 2	Lamberto Bava	Nancy Brilli, Asia Argento	Horror	
Detective School Dropouts	Filippo Ottoni	David Landsberg, Lorin Dreyfuss, Christian De Sica, Valeria Golino	crime-comedy	Italian-American co-production
Devil in the Flesh (Diavolo in corpo)	Marco Bellocchio	Maruschka Detmers, Federico Pitzalis	drama	Polemic film with sex on screen. Based on the Raymond Radiguet's novel
The Devil's Honey (Il miele del diavolo)	Lucio Fulci	Brett Halsey, Corinne Cléry	thriller	
Desiderando Giulia	Andrea Barzini	Serena Grandi, Johan Leysen, Sergio Rubini	erotic	
Les Exploits d'un jeune Don Juan	Gianfranco Mingozzi	Serena Grandi, Claudine Auger, Marina Vlady	Erotic	French-Italian co-production
Francesca è mia	Roberto Russo	Monica Vitti, Corrado Pani	romance	
Ginger and Fred (Ginger e Fred)	Federico Fellini	Marcello Mastroianni, Giulietta Masina, Franco Fabrizi	Felliniesque	3 David di Donatello. Golden Globe nominee. 4 Nastro d'Argento. BAFTA nominee
Grandi magazzini	Castellano & Pipolo	Enrico Montesano, Renato Pozzetto, Paolo Villaggio, Nino Manfredi, Laura Antonelli, Ornella Muti	Anthology comedy	
I Love You	Marco Ferreri	Christopher Lambert, Eddy Mitchell	drama	Entered into the 1986 Cannes Film Festival
The Killer Is Still Among Us	Camillo Teti	Mariangela D'Abbraccio, Giovanni Visentin, Riccardo Parisio Perrotti	Horror	
A Lustful Mind (Lussuria)	Joe D'Amato	Lilli Carati, Al Cliver	erotic	
The Inquiry	Damiano Damiani	Keith Carradine, Harvey Keitel, Lina Sastri	historical drama	
Momo	Johannes Schaaf	Radost Bokel, Leopoldo Trieste, Mario Adorf	fantasy	German-Italian co-production
Morirai a mezzanotte	Lamberto Bava	Valeria D'Obici	horror	
The Name of the Rose	Jean-Jacques Annaud	Sean Connery, F. Murray Abraham, Christian Slater	Romance, Drama	West German-French-Italian co-production
Naso di cane	Pasquale Squitieri	Claudia Cardinale, Donald Pleasence, Raymond Pellegrin	Drama	Made for television
Operation Nam	Fabrizio De Angelis	Oliver Tobias, Christopher Connelly	—N/a	West German-Italian co-production
Otello	Franco Zeffirelli	Plácido Domingo, Justino Díaz, Katia Ricciarelli	Opera	Giuseppe Verdi's Otello. Academy Award nominee. BAFTA nominee. National Board of Review winner
Il ragazzo del pony express	Franco Amurri	Jerry Calà, Isabella Ferrari, Alessandro Benvenuti	comedy	
Regalo di Natale	Pupi Avati	Carlo Delle Piane, Diego Abatantuono	Drama	4 awards
Romance	Massimo Mazzucco	Luca Barbareschi, Walter Chiari	comedy-drama	
Salome	Claude d'Anna	Jo Champa, Fabrizio Bentivoglio, Tomas Milian	drama	Screened at the 1986 Cannes Film Festival
Il Sapore del Grano (The Flavor of Corn)	Gianni Da Campo	Marina Vlady	Romance, Drama	2 awards at the Festival del Cinema Neorealistico
Scuola di ladri	Neri Parenti	Enrico Maria Salerno, Paolo Villaggio, Lino Banfi, Massimo Boldi	comedy	
Sembra morto... ma è solo svenuto	Felice Farina	Sergio Castellitto, Marina Confalone	comedy-drama	
Sensi	Gabriele Lavia	Monica Guerritore, Gabriele Lavia	erotic	
Senza scrupoli	Tonino Valerii	Sandra Wey	erotic	
Separati in casa	Riccardo Pazzaglia	Riccardo Pazzaglia, Marina Confalone	comedy	
La signora della notte	Piero Schivazappa	Serena Grandi	erotic	
Speriamo che sia femmina	Mario Monicelli	Liv Ullmann, Catherine Deneuve, Giuliana De Sio, Stefania Sandrelli, Philippe Noiret, Giuliano Gemma	Commedia all'italiana	7 David di Donatello. Nastro d'Argento for Best Director
La sposa americana	Giovanni Soldati	Stefania Sandrelli, Harvey Keitel	Romance, Drama	
La Storia	Luigi Comencini	Claudia Cardinale, Francisco Rabal	Drama	
Storia d'amore	Francesco Maselli	Valeria Golino, Luigi Diberti	drama	Special Jury Prize (Venice Film Festival)
Una spina nel cuore (A Thorn in the Heart)	Alberto Lattuada	Anthony Delon, Sophie Duez, Antonella Lualdi, Gastone Moschin	Romance, Drama	
Stregati	Francesco Nuti	Francesco Nuti, Ornella Muti	comedy	
Summer Night, with Greek Profile, Almond Eyes and Scent of Basil	Lina Wertmüller	Mariangela Melato, Michele Placido	comedy	
Superfantagenio	Bruno Corbucci	Bud Spencer	comedy	
Superfantozzi	Neri Parenti	Paolo Villaggio, Gigi Reder	comedy	
Il tenente dei carabinieri	Maurizio Ponzi	Enrico Montesano, Nino Manfredi, Massimo Boldi	comedy	
Three Men on Fire	Richard Harrison	Richard Harrison, Alphonse Beni	action	
Troppo forte	Carlo Verdone	Carlo Verdone, Alberto Sordi	comedy	
Vendetta dal futuro	Sergio Martino	Daniel Greene, Janet Agren, John Saxon	sci-fi	
The Venetian Woman	Mauro Bolognini	Laura Antonelli, Monica Guerritore, Jason Connery	erotic	
Yuppies	Carlo Vanzina	Jerry Calà, Christian De Sica, Massimo Boldi	comedy	
Yuppies 2	Enrico Oldoini	Jerry Calà, Christian De Sica, Massimo Boldi	comedy	
