= Giovanni Veronesi =

Italian film screenwriter, actor and director (born 1962)

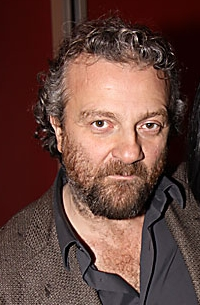
- Veronesi in 2009
- Born: 31 August 1962 (age 64); Prato, Italy
- Occupations: Filmmaker; actor
- Years active: 1985–present
- Height: 1.75 m (5 ft 9 in)

Giovanni Veronesi (born August 31, 1962) is an Italian director, screenwriter and actor. Most known for his romantic comedy trilogy: Manual of Love (2005), Manual of Love 2 (2007) and The Ages of Love (2011), he work as a screenwriter for Francesco Nuti, Leonardo Pieraccioni, Carlo Verdone and Massimo Ceccherini.

Throughout his career, he has been honored with a David di Donatello for Best Screenplay for For Love, Only for Love (1993), two Nastri d'Argento for Best Screenplay for the films Il ciclone (1996) and Manual of Love (2005), and a Globo d'oro for his direction of Romeo Is Juliet (2024). He has also directed music videos for italian music artists Elisa, Negramaro and Gianna Nannini, directed theatre productions and hosted television and radio programs.

== Life and career ==
Giovanni Veronesi was born on August 31, 1962, in Prato. His father, Giannino Veronesi, was an engineer and sailor, and his mother, Luisa Govoni, an literature teacher; both were originally from Bologna. Veronesi grew up in Prato and Roccamare with his parents and his brother Sandro Veronesi.

After graduating at the high school in Prato, he joined the city's theater circles, where he met Francesco Nuti, a fledgling director from Florence. Veronesi formed a close friendship with Nuti, who had temporarily moved to Rome to work on the production of Maurizio Ponzi’s film What a Ghostly Silence There Is Tonight. Nuti persuaded Veronesi to move to Rome with him at the age of 20, offering him a place to stay as a roommate.

=== 1980–1999: Francesco Nuti, directorial debut and emergence as a screenwriter ===
After some minor roles in Maurizio Ponzi and Pupi Avati's movies, in 1984, Veronesi co-wrote his first feature film screenplay All the Fault of Paradise with Vincenzo Cerami and Francesco Nuti, who also directed the film. In 1986, he wrote the screenplay for Nuti’s second film Stregati, while in 1987, he co-wrote his directorial debut Maramao, written with his brother Sandro. Between 1988 and 1993, he wrote three screenplays with Nuti, appearing in the cast as an actor in Caruso Pascoski, Son of a Pole (1988) and Willy Signori e vengo da lontano (1989).

In 1993, Aurelio De Laurentiis produced Veronesi's second film, For Love, Only for Love, written by Veronesi and Ugo Chiti, the film starred Penélope Cruz, Diego Abatantuono, Stefania Sandrelli and Alessandro Haber. The film received ten David di Donatello nominations, winning for Best Screenplay. Between 1994 and 1995, he returned to work as a screenwriter on Nuti's OcchioPinocchio (1994) and collaborated with Christian De Sica on Men Men Men (1995) and with Leonardo Pieraccioni on The Graduates.

While he directed some box-office flop films, including Viola Kisses Everybody (1998) starring Asia Argento and Valerio Mastandrea, he achieved greater success as a screenwriter, co-writing the films Il ciclone (1996) and Fuochi d'artificio (1997) with Leonardo Pieraccioni. For Il ciclone, Veronesi won his first Nastro d'Argento for Best Screenplay.

=== 2000–2010: The success with What Will Happen to Us and Manual of Love's saga ===
In 2000, he worked with Carlo Verdone for the first time on A Chinese in a Coma. In 2001, Veronesi returned to directing with Witches to the North, co-written with his brother Sandro Veronesi and Massimiliano Governi. In 2004, he wrote and directed What Will Happen to Us, earning twelve nominations at the 2005 David di Donatello, including for Best Film.

In 2005, Manual of Love, written and directed by Veronesi, was a critical and box-office success. The film received twelve nominations for the 2006 David di Donatello, winning in the lead acting categories for Carlo Verdone and Margherita Buy, and earning Veronesi his second Nastro d'Argento for Best Screenplay. In 2007 Veronesi directed the sequel, Manual of Love 2, the film was a box office success and received critical acclaim. Veronesi also directed the music video for the film's soundtrack song, "Eppure sentire (Un senso di te)", written and performed by Italian singer-songwriter Elisa.

In 2008, he directed the music video for Negramaro's "Meraviglioso", a song included on the soundtrack for Veronesi's film Italians, which was released in Italian theaters in 2009. That same year, he co-wrote the film Me and Marilyn with Leonardo Pieraccioni. In 2010, he directed Parents and Children: Shake Well Before Using starring Silvio Orlando, Luciana Littizzetto, and Elena Sofia Ricci. The film earned Veronesi a nomination for the David Giovani Award and two nominations for the Nastri d'Argento.

=== 2011-2019: Career as a director and new projects in television, radio and theater ===
In 2011, The Ages of Love was released in theaters, featuring a cast that included Carlo Verdone, Riccardo Scamarcio, Monica Bellucci, and Robert De Niro. That same year, he wrote the screenplay for the film Finalmente la felicità, directed by Leonardo Pieraccioni. In 2013, he directed the film The Fifth Wheel, the opening film of the eighth edition of the Rome International Film Festival, which received nominations at the Ciak d'oro and Nastri d'Argento. The film's soundtrack was composed by singer-songwriter Elisa, who also wrote the title track "Ecco che", whose music video was directed by Veronesi himself.

From June 2014 through 2019, he co-hosted the Rai Radio 2 TV show Non è un paese per giovani with Massimo Cervelli. In 2014, he directed and co-wrote the film A Woman as a Friend, starring Fabio De Luigi and Laetitia Casta. In 2015, he collaborated again with Leonardo Pieraccioni on Il professor Cenerentolo. In 2016, he embarked the italian theater tour A ruota libera with Nino Frassica, Sergio Rubini, Alessandro Haber and Rocco Papaleo, which ended in 2019.

In 2017, he directed the film No Country for Young Men, which received nominations for the Ciak D'oro and Nastri d'Argento. In 2018, The King's Musketeers was released, a comedy starring the musketeer, for which he received a David Giovani nomination at the 2019 David di Donatello. In 2019, he host and co-write Rai 2 TV show's Maledetti amici miei, based on his the stage play A ruota libera, featuring Rocco Papaleo, Sergio Rubini, Alessandro Haber, Max Tortora and Margherita Buy.

=== 2021–present: Return to film and theater and the success with Romeo is Juliet ===
In 2020, the film Tutti per 1 - 1 per tutti, the sequel to The King's Musketeers, was not released in theaters due to the COVID-19 pandemic in Italy but was broadcast on Sky Cinema Uno Italia. In 2021, he reunited with Carlo Verdone, after twenty years from their first collaboration, to co-write the screenplay for the film Si vive una volta sola, which was nominated for a Nastro d'Argento for Best Comedy.

In 2024, the film Romeo Is Juliet, starring Sergio Castellitto and Pilar Fogliati, was released in italian theaters, earning Veronesi a nomination for Best Comedy at the Nastri d'Argento Awards and his first Globo d'Oro for Best Comedy.

In 2026, God Laughs will mark his first film selected to the Venice Film Festival, as the closing film for the 83rd edition.

== Personal life ==
Born in Prato, he is the brother of the writer Sandro Veronesi. His partner is the Italian actress Valeria Solarino, whom Veronesi directed in What Will Happen to Us.

== Filmography ==
=== Feature films ===
Year	English Title	Original Title	Notes
1987	Maramao		Co-written with Sandro Veronesi
1993	For Love, Only for Love	Per amore, solo per amore	Co-written with Ugo Chiti
1996	Silenzio... si nasce		Co-written with Ugo Chiti
1996	The Barber of Rio	Il barbiere di Rio	Co-written with Ugo Chiti
1998	Viola Kisses Everybody	Viola bacia tutti	Co-written with Rocco Papaleo
1998	Gunslinger's Revenge	Il mio West	Co-written with Leonardo Pieraccioni
2001	Witches to the North	Streghe verso nord	Co-written with Sandro Veronesi and Massimiliano Governi
2004	What Will Happen to Us	Che ne sarà di noi	Co-written with Silvio Muccino
2005	Manual of Love	Manuale d'amore	Co-written with Vincenzo Cerami and Ugo Chiti
2007	Manual of Love 2	Manuale d'amore 2 - Capitoli successivi	Co-written with Andrea Agnello and Ugo Chiti
2009	Italians		Co-written with Andrea Agnello and Ugo Chiti
2010	Parents and Children: Shake Well Before Using	Genitori & figli - Agitare bene prima dell'uso	Co-written with Andrea Agnello and Ugo Chiti
2011	The Ages of Love	Manuale d'amore 3	Co-written with Ugo Chiti
2013	The Fifth Wheel	L'ultima ruota del carro	Co-written with Filippo Bologna, Ugo Chiti and Ernesto Fioretti
2014	A Woman as a Friend	Una donna per amica	Co-written with Ugo Chiti
2017	No Country for Young Men	Non è un paese per giovani	Co-written with Ilaria Macchia and Andrea Paolo Massara
2018	The King's Musketeers	Moschettieri del re - La penultima missione	Co-written with Nicola Baldoni
2020		Tutti per 1 - 1 per tutti	
2024	Romeo Is Juliet	Romeo è Giulietta	Co-written with Pilar Fogliati and Nicola Baldoni
2026	God Laughs	Dio Ride	

=== Only screenwriter ===
- All the Fault of Paradise (1985)
- Stregati (1987)
- Caruso Pascoski, Son of a Pole (1988)
- Women in Skirts (1991)
- Vacanze di Natale '91 (1991)
- Anni 90 (1992)
- Amami (1992)
- OcchioPinocchio (1994)
- Men Men Men (1995)
- The Graduates (1995)
- 3 (1996)
- The Cyclone (1996)
- Five Stormy Days (1997)
- Fireworks (1997)
- Lucignolo (1999)
- The Fish in Love (1999)
- A Chinese in a Coma (2000)
- Picasso's Face (2000)
- The Prince and the Pirate (2001)
- My Life with Stars and Stripes (2003)
- Suddenly Paradise (2003)
- I Love You in Every Language in the World (2005)
- Il professor Cenerentolo (2015)
- Si vive una volta sola (2021)

=== Music video ===
Year	Song	Artist	Notes
2007	"Eppure sentire (Un senso di te)"	Elisa	Director
2008	"Meraviglioso"	Negramaro	Director
2013	"Ecco che"	Elisa	Director
2013	"Inno"	Gianna Nannini	Director
2014	"Un amore così grande"	Negramaro	Director
2016	"Lo sai da qui"	Negramaro	Director

=== Actor ===
- A School Outing (1983)
- Caruso Pascoski, Son of a Pole (1988)
- Picasso's Face (2000)
- Fughe da fermo (2001)

== Accolades ==
Award	Year	Category	Nominated work	Result	Ref.
David di Donatello Award	1994	Best Screenplay	For Love, Only for Love	Won	
David di Donatello Award	2005	Best Film	Manual of Love	Nominated	
David di Donatello Award	2005	Best Screenplay	Manual of Love	Nominated	
David di Donatello Award	2010	Young David Award	Parents and Children: Shake Well Before Using	Nominated	
David di Donatello Award	2019	Young David Award	The King's Musketeers	Nominated	
Globo d'oro	2024	Best Comedy Film	Romeo Is Juliet	Won	
Nastri d'argento	1997	Best Screenplay	The Cyclone	Won	
Nastri d'argento	2006	Best Italian Film	Manual of Love	Nominated	
Nastri d'argento	2006	Best Screenplay	Manual of Love	Won	
Nastri d'argento	2010	Best Comedy Film	Parents and Children: Shake Well Before Using	Nominated	
Nastri d'argento	2010	Best Screenplay	Parents and Children: Shake Well Before Using	Nominated	
Nastri d'argento	2021	Best Comedy Film	All for One, One for All	Nominated	
Nastri d'argento	2024	Best Comedy Film	Romeo Is Juliet	Nominated	
Nastri d'argento	2025	Special Nastro d'Argento	The Blue Avalanche	Won	
