= List of Columbia Pictures films (1980–1989) =

The following is a list of films produced and/or released by Columbia Pictures in 1980–1989. Most films listed here were distributed theatrically in the United States by the company's distribution division, Sony Pictures Releasing (formerly known as Triumph Releasing Corporation (1982–1994) and Columbia TriStar Film Distributors International (1988–2005)). It is one of the Big Five film studios. Columbia Pictures is a subsidiary of Japanese conglomerate Sony.

== 1980 ==
Release date	Title	Notes
May 30, 1980	The Hollywood Knights	co-production with PolyGram Pictures
June 1, 1980	The Mountain Men	co-production with Polyc International BV
June 6, 1980	Night of the Juggler (Note: Distribution rights currently owned by Kino Lorber in the U.S. and Radiance Films in the U.K.)	U.S., U.K., Irish, Australian and New Zealand theatrical distribution only; produced by GCC Productions
June 13, 1980	Wholly Moses!	—
June 20, 1980	The Blue Lagoon	—
July 11, 1980	Used Cars	—
October 1, 1980	Gloria	—
October 17, 1980	Foolin' Around	U.S., U.K., Irish, Australian, New Zealand and Spanish theatrical distribution only; produced by GCC Productions
October 24, 1980	It's My Turn	co-production with Rastar
October 31, 1980	Touched by Love	North American distribution only; produced by Rastar and Dove, Inc.
December 3, 1980	The Competition	co-production with Rastar
December 12, 1980	Stir Crazy	—
December 12, 1980	Tess (Note: Owned by Pathé, with U.S. distribution rights currently licensed to Janus Films and The Criterion Collection)	North American, U.K., Irish, Australian and New Zealand distribution only Nominee for the Academy Award for Best Picture
December 19, 1980	Seems Like Old Times	co-production with Rastar

== 1981 ==
Release date	Title	Notes
February 13, 1981	American Pop	co-production with Bakshi Productions
March 13, 1981	Modern Romance	—
May 9, 1981	Spider-Man: The Dragon's Challenge	international distribution only; co-production with Danchuck Productions and Marvel Comics
May 15, 1981	Happy Birthday to Me	co-production with Canadian Film Development Corporation and Famous Players
June 5, 1981	Nice Dreams	co-production with C&C Brown Productions
June 26, 1981	Stripes	—
June 29, 1981	Lady Chatterley's Lover (Note: Owned by MGM)	select international distribution only; produced by Golan-Globus Productions
July 16, 1981	Enter the Ninja	select international distribution only; produced by The Cannon Group, Inc. and First City Films
August 7, 1981	Heavy Metal	Canadian film; produced by Guardian Trust Company, Canadian Film Development Corporation, Famous Players and Potterton Productions
August 14, 1981	Nobody's Perfekt	co-production with Rastar
September 23, 1981	Only When I Laugh	co-production with Rastar
December 18, 1981	Absence of Malice	co-production with Mirage Enterprises
December 18, 1981	Neighbors	co-production with the Zanuck/Brown Company

== 1982 ==
Release date	Title	Notes
February 11, 1982	One from the Heart (Note: Owned by American Zoetrope, with U.S. distribution rights split between Rialto Pictures for theatrical and Lionsgate for certain rights)	North American distribution only; produced by Zoetrope Studios
February 11, 1982	Death Wish II	international distribution only; produced by Golan-Globus Productions; distributed in North America by Filmways Pictures
March 12, 1982	Richard Pryor: Live on the Sunset Strip	co-production with Rastar
April 2, 1982	Silent Rage	co-production with Topkick Productions
May 5, 1982	The Street Sweeper	Mexican film; produced by Cantinflas Films S.A.
May 14, 1982	Wrong Is Right	co-production with Rastar
May 21, 1982	Annie	co-production with Rastar
June 4, 1982	Hanky Panky	—
June 25, 1982	Monty Python Live at the Hollywood Bowl (Note: Owned by Python (Monty) Pictures)	North American theatrical distribution only; produced by HandMade Films
August 4, 1982	Things Are Tough All Over	co-production with C&C Brown Productions
August 13, 1982	Tempest	—
August 14, 1982	Piranha II: The Spawning	international distribution only; distributed in the U.S. by Saturn International Pictures
November 2, 1982	The Missionary (Note: Owned by HandMade Films)	North American theatrical and television distribution only; produced by HandMade Films
December 8, 1982	Gandhi	co‐production with Goldcrest Films, International Film Investors, National Film Development Corporation of India and Indo-British Films; Winner of the Academy Award for Best Picture
December 10, 1982	The Toy	co-production with Rastar
December 17, 1982	Tootsie	co-production with Mirage Enterprises and Punch Productions; Nominee for the Academy Award for Best Picture

== 1983 ==
Release date	Title	Notes
January 21, 1983	Treasure of the Four Crowns	international distribution only; produced by The Cannon Group, Inc.
March 25, 1983	Spring Break	—
April 21, 1983	The Wicked Lady	select international theatrical distribution only; produced by The Cannon Group, Inc.
May 13, 1983	Blue Thunder	co-production with Rastar
May 20, 1983	Spacehunter: Adventures in the Forbidden Zone	co-production with Delphi Productions
June 22, 1983	The Survivors	co-production with Rastar
July 29, 1983	Krull	—
August 19, 1983	Yor, the Hunter from the Future	North American distribution only
September 7, 1983	Man, Woman and Child	international distribution only; produced by Gaylord Productions; distributed in North America by Paramount Pictures
September 30, 1983	The Big Chill	co-production with Carson Productions; Nominee for the Academy Award for Best Picture; Inducted into the National Film Registry in 2025
October 28, 1983	Educating Rita	distribution outside the U.K. and Ireland only; produced by Acorn Pictures
December 6, 1983	The Dresser	British film; distribution only; produced by Goldcrest Films and World Film Services; Nominee for the Academy Award for Best Picture
December 9, 1983	Christine	co-production with Polar Film and Delphi Premier Productions
December 16, 1983	The Man Who Loved Women	—
December 16, 1983	Sahara	select international theatrical distribution only; produced by The Cannon Group, Inc.

== 1984 ==
Release date	Title	Notes
March 2, 1984	Against All Odds	co-production with Delphi Productions
April 6, 1984	Moscow on the Hudson	co-production with Delphi Premier Productions
May 4, 1984	Hardbodies	distribution only; produced by Chroma III Productions (uncredited)
June 8, 1984	Ghostbusters	co-production with Delphi Productions; Inducted into the National Film Registry in 2015
June 22, 1984	The Karate Kid	co-production with Delphi II Productions; Inducted into the National Film Registry in 2025
August 17, 1984	Sheena	co-production with Delphi II Productions
September 14, 1984	A Soldier's Story	Nominee for the Academy Award for Best Picture; Nominee of the Golden Globe Award for Best Motion Picture – Drama
October 19, 1984	The Razor's Edge	Remake of 1946 film
October 26, 1984	Body Double	co-production with Delphi II Productions
November 9, 1984	No Small Affair	co-production with Delphi II Productions
December 14, 1984	A Passage to India	North American distribution only; produced by Thorn EMI Screen Entertainment and Home Box Office; Nominee for the Academy Award for Best Picture
December 14, 1984	Starman	co-production with Delphi II Productions
December 21, 1984	Micki & Maude	co-production with Delphi III Productions

== 1985 ==
Release date	Title	Notes
January 18, 1985	The New Kids	co-production with Fogbound, Inc.
February 15, 1985	Fast Forward	co-production with Delphi III Productions and Verdon-Cedric Productions
March 15, 1985	Sylvester	co-production with Rastar
March 29, 1985	The Slugger's Wife	co-production with Delphi II Productions and Rastar
April 26, 1985	Just One of the Guys	co-production with Summa Entertainment Group and Triton
May 22, 1985	Steaming	international distribution only; produced by World Film Services; distributed in North America by New World Pictures
June 7, 1985	Perfect	co-production with Delphi III Productions
June 20, 1985	D.A.R.Y.L.	international distribution only; co-production with World Film Services; distributed in North America by Paramount Pictures
June 28, 1985	St. Elmo's Fire	co-production with Delphi IV Productions
July 10, 1985	Silverado	co-production with Delphi IV Productions
August 2, 1985	Fright Night	co-production with Delphi IV Productions and Vistar Films
August 16, 1985	The Bride	co-production with Delphi III Productions
September 27, 1985	Agnes of God	co-production with Delphi IV Productions
October 4, 1985	Jagged Edge	co-production with Delphi IV Productions
November 22, 1985	White Nights	co-production with Delphi IV Productions and New Visions
December 11, 1985	Miami Supercops	Italian film; distribution in Italy, the Benelux, France, Spain and Germany only
December 20, 1985	A Chorus Line (Note: Owned by StudioCanal, with U.S. home video and digital distribution rights owned by MGM; Sony Pictures Television retains TV rights)	U.S. theatrical distribution only; produced by Embassy Films Associates and PolyGram Pictures
December 20, 1985	All the Fault of Paradise	Italian film; produced by Cecchi Gori Group
December 25, 1985	Murphy's Romance	co-production with Delphi IV Productions and Fogwood Films

== 1986 ==
Release date	Title	Notes
February 14, 1986	Quicksilver	co-production with Delphi V Productions and The IndieProd Company
March 7, 1986	Care Bears Movie II: A New Generation	distribution only; produced by Nelvana and LBS Communications
March 14, 1986	Crossroads	—
April 18, 1986	Desert Bloom	co-production with Delphi IV Productions and Carson Productions
April 25, 1986	Crimewave (Note: Owned by StudioCanal, with U.S. distribution rights currently split between MGM for theatrical and home video, and Quiver Distribution for digital and streaming; Sony Pictures Television retains TV rights)	U.S. theatrical distribution only; produced by Embassy Pictures
April 25, 1986	Violets Are Blue	co-production with Delphi IV Productions and Rastar
May 2, 1986	Jo Jo Dancer, Your Life Is Calling	co-production with Delphi V Productions
May 2, 1986	Saving Grace	U.S. theatrical distribution only; produced by Embassy Pictures
May 30, 1986	Big Trouble	co-production with Delphi III Productions
June 20, 1986	The Karate Kid Part II	co-production with Delphi V Productions
June 27, 1986	American Anthem (Note: Owned by Warner Bros.)	North American theatrical distribution only; produced by Lorimar Motion Pictures
July 25, 1986	Out of Bounds	co-production with Delphi V Productions and Fries Entertainment
August 8, 1986	A Fine Mess	co-production with Delphi V Productions
August 15, 1986	Armed and Dangerous	co-production with Delphi V Productions
August 22, 1986	One More Saturday Night	co-production with Delphi V Productions
August 22, 1986	Stand by Me	distribution only; produced by Act III Communications; Nominee of the Golden Globe Award for Best Motion Picture – Drama
August 1986	Stewardess School	co-production with Delphi V Productions and Summa Entertainment Group
October 10, 1986	That's Life!	theatrical and television distribution only; co-production with Delphi V Productions
November 20, 1986	The Moro Affair	Italian film; distribution only; co-production with Yarno Cinematografica
December 12, 1986	Where Are The Children?	co-production with Rastar
December 19, 1986	Bewitched	Italian film; produced by Cecchi Gori Group

== 1987 ==
Release date	Title	Notes
February 13, 1987	84 Charing Cross Road	co-production with Brooksfilms
May 15, 1987	Ishtar	co-production with Delphi V Productions
June 19, 1987	Roxanne	co-production with The IndieProd Company and L.A. Films
July 10, 1987	White Water Summer	co-production with Delphi V Productions and Polar Entertainment
July 24, 1987	La Bamba	distribution only; produced by New Visions
August 7, 1987	Happy New Year	co-production with Delphi IV Productions
August 21, 1987	The Big Easy (Note: Owned by Lionsgate)	U.S. theatrical distribution only; produced by Kings Road Entertainment
September 25, 1987	The Big Town	North American theatrical and television distribution only
October 9, 1987	Someone to Watch Over Me	—
October 16, 1987	Hope and Glory	North American theatrical, U.K., Irish and Japanese distribution only; produced by Goldcrest Films; co-distributed by Nelson Entertainment in North America; Nominee for the Academy Award for Best Picture
November 5, 1987	My First Forty Years	Italian film; distribution only; produced by Cecchi Gori Group released in the US in October 1989
November 20, 1987	The Last Emperor (Note: Owned by HanWay Films with U.S. distribution rights licensed to Janus Films and The Criterion Collection and some rights to Shout! Studios)	distribution in North America theatrically, the U.K., Ireland, Australia, New Zealand, Latin America and Italy only; produced by Recorded Picture Company; co-distributed by Hemdale Film Corporation in North America; Winner of the Academy Award for Best Picture; Winner of the Golden Globe Award for Best Motion Picture – Drama
November 25, 1987	Housekeeping	—
December 4, 1987	The Stranger	—
December 18, 1987	Leonard Part 6	co-production with SAH Enterprises, Inc.
December 19, 1987	Me and My Sister	Italian film; distribution only; produced by Cecchi Gori Group
December 23, 1987	The ways of the Lord are over	Italian film; distribution

== 1988 ==
Release date	Title	Notes
February 12, 1988	School Daze	co-production with 40 Acres and a Mule Filmworks
March 4, 1988	Pulse	co-production with Aspen Film Society
March 11, 1988	Vice Versa	—
March 18, 1988	Little Nikita	—
March 18, 1988	Stars and Bars	—
April 15, 1988	Zelly and Me	co-production with Cypress Films and Mark/Jett Productions
April 22, 1988	A Time of Destiny	North American theatrical distribution only; produced by Nelson Entertainment and Alive Films
May 6, 1988	White Mischief	British film; North American theatrical, U.K. and Irish distribution only; co-distributed by Nelson Entertainment in North America; produced by Goldcrest, Umbrella Films and BBC
July 29, 1988	The New Adventures of Pippi Longstocking	North and Latin American, U.K., Irish and West German distribution only; co-production with Svensk Filmindustri
August 5, 1988	Vibes	co-production with Imagine Entertainment
August 19, 1988	The Big Blue (Note: U.S. distribution rights to this film have since been transferred to sister company Sony Pictures Classics, which in turn acquired them from producer Gaumont)	North American distribution with Weintraub Entertainment Group only; produced by Gaumont
September 2, 1988	Rocket Gibraltar	—
September 2, 1988	The Legend of the Holy Drinker	Italian film; distribution only; produced by Cecchi Gori Group
September 16, 1988	The Beast	co-production with A&M Films
October 7, 1988	Punchline	co-production with Fogwood Productions and The IndieProd Company
October 14, 1988	The Little Devil	Italian film; distribution only; produced by Cecchi Gori Group
October 21, 1988	Things Change	distribution outside West Germany only; co-production with Filmhaus
November 18, 1988	Fresh Horses	distribution outside U.S. television only; produced by Weintraub Entertainment Group
December 9, 1988	My Stepmother is an Alien	distribution outside U.S. television only; produced by Weintraub Entertainment Group and Catalina Production Group
December 16, 1988	Caruso Pascoski, Son of a Pole	Italian film; distribution only under the Columbia Tri-Star Films Italia label; produced by Cecchi Gori Group
December 22, 1988	Fantozzi Retires	Italian film; distribution only under the Columbia Tri-Star Films Italia label; produced by Cecchi Gori Group

== 1989 ==
Release date	Title	Notes
January 27, 1989	Physical Evidence	North American theatrical and television distribution only; co-production with Martin Ransohoff Productions
February 17, 1989	True Believer	co-production with Lasker/Parkes Productions
March 10, 1989	Hanussen	U.S. distribution only
March 10, 1989	The Adventures of Baron Munchausen	distribution outside West Germany theatrically and Italy only; co-production with Allied Filmmakers, Prominent Features and Laura Film
March 24, 1989	Troop Beverly Hills	distribution outside U.S. television only; produced by Weintraub Entertainment Group, Fries Entertainment and Avanti
April 14, 1989	She's Out of Control	distribution outside U.S. television only; produced by Weintraub Entertainment Group
April 14, 1989	Winter People (Note: Full rights owned by Warner Bros.; MGM owns certain non-theatrical rights)	North American theatrical distribution only; produced by Nelson Entertainment and Castle Rock Entertainment (uncredited)
May 5, 1989	Listen to Me	distribution outside U.S. television only; produced by Weintraub Entertainment Group
June 16, 1989	Ghostbusters II	—
June 30, 1989	The Karate Kid Part III	—
July 21, 1989	Eat a Bowl of Tea	co-production with American Playhouse Theatrical Films
July 21, 1989	When Harry Met Sally...	North American theatrical distribution only; produced by Castle Rock Entertainment and Nelson Entertainment; Inducted into the National Film Registry in 2022
August 4, 1989	Me and Him	North American distribution only; produced by Neue Constanstin Film
August 18, 1989	Casualties of War	—
August 25, 1989	The Adventures of Milo and Otis	North American distribution only; produced by Fuji Television Network
September 15, 1989	The Big Picture	co-production with Aspen Film Society
September 29, 1989	Welcome Home	North American distribution only; co-production with Martin Ransohoff Productions
October 6, 1989	Old Gringo	co-production with Fonda Films
October 13, 1989	To Kill a Priest	distribution outside France only
October 27, 1989	Immediate Family	co-production with Sanford/Pillsbury Productions
November 3, 1989	Bloodhounds of Broadway	co-production with American Playhouse Theatrical Films

== See also ==
- List of film serials by studio § Columbia Pictures
- Columbia Pictures
- List of TriStar Pictures films
- List of Screen Gems films
- Sony Pictures Classics
- Category:Lists of films by studio
