= Antonio Petrocelli =

Italian actor (born 1953)

- Born: 18 September 1953 (age 72); Montalbano Jonico, Italy
- Occupation: Actor
- Years active: 1979 – present
- Height: 1.83 m (6 ft 0 in)

Antonio Petrocelli (born 18 September 1953) is an Italian actor.

== Partial filmography ==
=== Film ===
- The Pool Hustlers (1982)
- The Eyes, the Mouth (1982)
- Secrets Secrets (1985)
- Il tenente dei carabinieri (1986)
- The Strangeness of Life (1987)
- Italian Night (1987)
- It's Happening Tomorrow (1988)
- Caruso Pascoski di padre polacco (1988)
- Willy Signori e vengo da lontano (1989)
- Red Wood Pigeon (1989)
- The Handsome Priest (1989)
- The Yes Man (1991)
- Donne con le gonne (1991)
- Un'altra vita (1992)
- Sud (1993)
- Where Are You? I'm Here (1993)
- Caro diario (1993)
- Who Killed Pasolini? (1995)
- The Second Time (1995)
- La scuola (1995)
- Vesna Goes Fast (1996)
- The Barber of Rio (1996)
- Freshwater Man (1997)
- An Eyewitness Account (1997)
- Mr. Fifteen Balls (1998)
- Outlaw (1999)
- Johnny the Partisan (2000)
- Nightwatchman (2000)
- Caruso, Zero for Conduct (2001)
- The Son's Room (2001)
- Azzurro (2001)
- El Alamein: The Line of Fire (2002)
- The Caiman (2006)
- Scordato (2023)

=== Television ===
- Don Matteo (2001)
- Valeria medico legale (2002)
- Imperium: Augustus (2003)
- Benedetti dal Signore (2004)
- Il mammo (2004–2007)
- I Cesaroni (2006–2012)
- Un medico in famiglia (2014)
- 1993 (2017)
- The New Pope (2019)
