= Novello Novelli =

Italian actor (1930–2018)

- Born: Novellantonio Novelli; 2 March 1930; Poggibonsi, Italy
- Died: 10 January 2018 (aged 87); Poggibonsi, Italy
- Occupation: Actor
- Height: 1.75 m (5 ft 9 in)

Novello Novelli (2 March 1930 – 10 January 2018) was an Italian character actor.

== Life and career ==
Born in Poggibonsi, province of Siena, as Novellantonio Novelli, a former footballer and surveyor, Novelli initially was the manager of the cabaret group "I Giancattivi" consisting of Francesco Nuti, Athina Cenci and Alessandro Benvenuti.

In 1981, he made his acting debut in Giancattivi's film West of Paperino, then, after the group disbanded, Novelli remained associated with Nuti, appearing in almost all his films.

He also worked with Benvenuti, being critically appreciated for his performances in Welcome to Home Gori and its sequel, Return to Home Gori.

== Death ==
Novelli died in Poggibonsi on 10 January 2018, aged 87.

== Partial filmography ==
- West of Paperino (1981) - Francesco's father
- What a Ghostly Silence There Is Tonight (1982) - Chiaramonti
- The Pool Hustlers (1983) - Merlo
- Son contento (1983) - 'Kursaal' director
- Casablanca, Casablanca (1985) - Il 'merlo'
- All the Fault of Paradise (1985) - Oste
- Stregati (1986) - Novello
- Noi uomini duri (1987) - Berno Berni Sr
- Maramao (1987) - The lone sailor
- Delitti e profumi (1988) - The ventriloquist
- Caruso Pascoski, Son of a Pole (1988) - The police chief
- Piccole stelle (1988)
- Musica per vecchi animali (1989) - Pittore del Metro
- Willy Signori e vengo da lontano (1989) - Il cadavere
- Welcome to Home Gori (1990) - Annibale
- The Party's Over (1991) - Corpo
- Allullo drom (1992) - Giuseppe
- Amami (1993) - Tullio Venturini
- Bonus malus (1993) - Signor Cecchi
- Cain vs. Cain (1993) - Aureliano Casamei
- Miracolo italiano (1994) - Nonno di Saverio
- OcchioPinocchio (1994) - Segugio
- Dear Goddamned Friends (1994) - Zingaro
- Noce di cocco (1995)
- Albergo Roma (1996)
- Return to Home Gori (1996) - Annibale
- Gli inaffidabili (1997) - Cinzia's father
- Mr. Fifteen Balls (1998) - Pool master
- I volontari (1998) - Alfonso
- Io amo Andrea (2000) - Il taxista
- Un altr'anno e poi cresco (2001) - The professor
- My Life with Stars and Stripes (2003) - Lando's father
- La mia squadra del cuore (2003)
- Via Varsavia (2006)
- Sedotta e bidonata (2007)
- Cenci in Cina (2009) - Forasassi
- Ridere fino a volare (2012)
- Una vita in gioco (2012) - Vito's grandfather
- Sarebbe stato facile (2013)
- Uscio e bottega (2014) - Himself (final film role)
