= Carlo Giuffrè =

Italian actor (1928–2018)

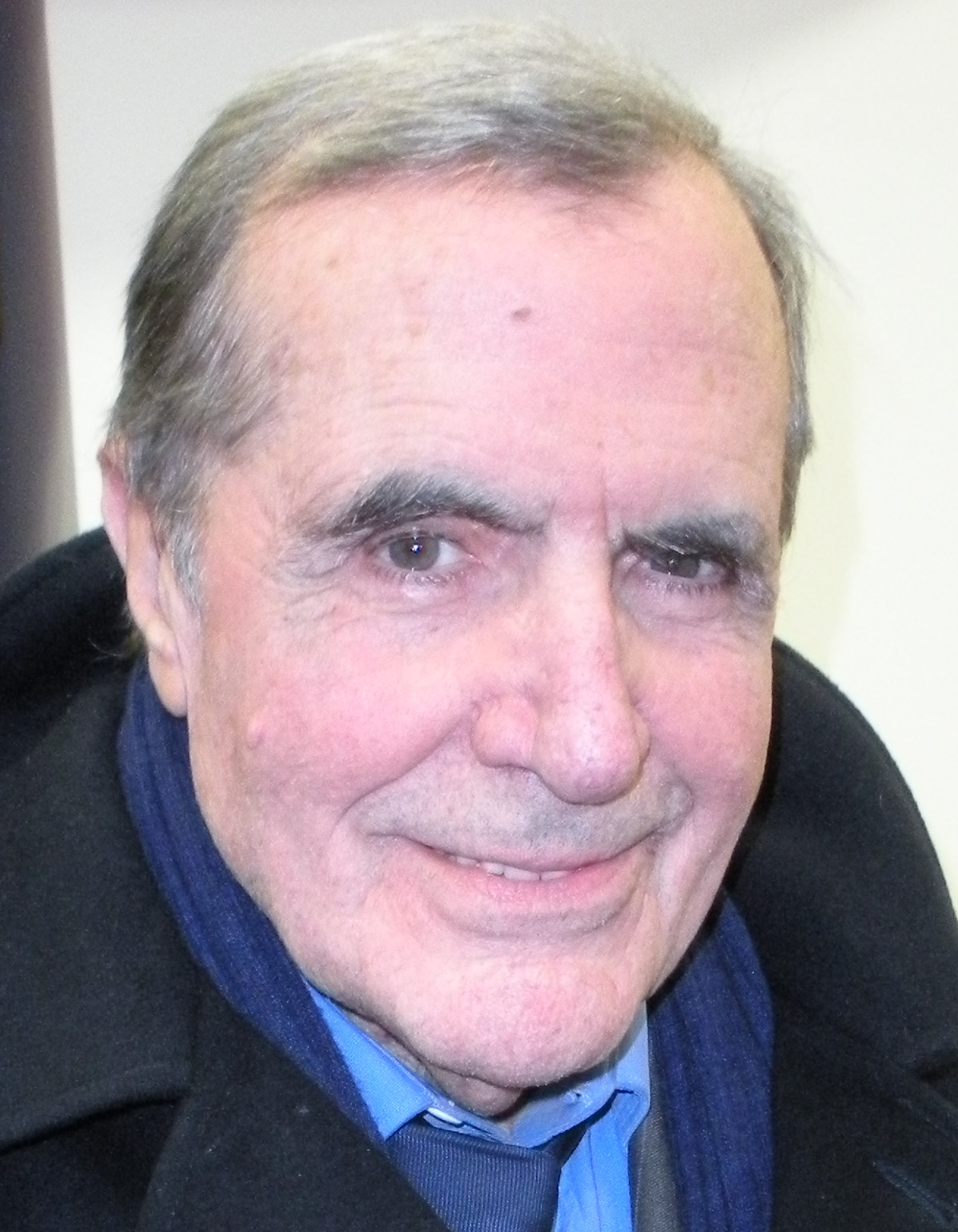
- Giuffrè in 2011
- Born: 3 December 1928; Naples, Kingdom of Italy
- Died: 1 November 2018 (aged 89); Rome, Italy
- Occupation: Actor
- Years active: 1942–1991; 2002–2018
- Height: 1.78 m (5 ft 10 in)
- Relatives: Aldo Giuffrè (brother)

Carlo Giuffrè (Italian pronunciation: [ˈkarlo dʒufˈfrɛ]; 3 December 1928 – 1 November 2018) was an Italian stage, film and television actor and a stage director. He appeared in more than 90 films between 1942 and 2002.

== Biography ==
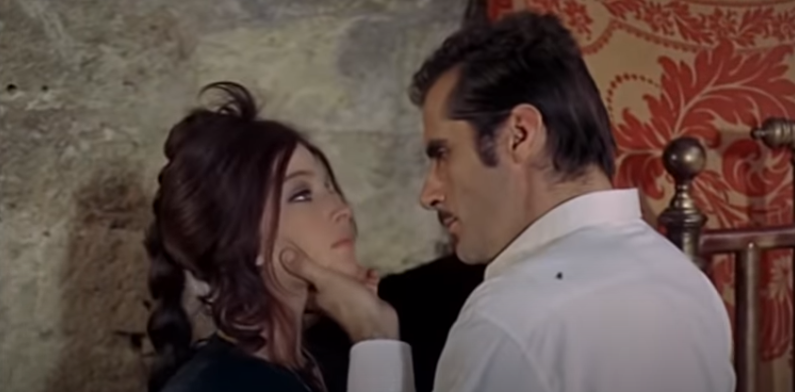
Giuffrè and Monica Vitti in La ragazza con la pistola (The Girl with the Pistol)

Giuffrè was born in Naples, Italy and was the brother of the actor Aldo Giuffrè. He enrolled at the National Academy of Dramatic Arts Silvio D'Amico, then he made his stage debut in 1949 with the company of Eduardo De Filippo. In 1984 Giuffrè won a David di Donatello for Best Supporting Actor for the comedy film Son contento, directed by Maurizio Ponzi.

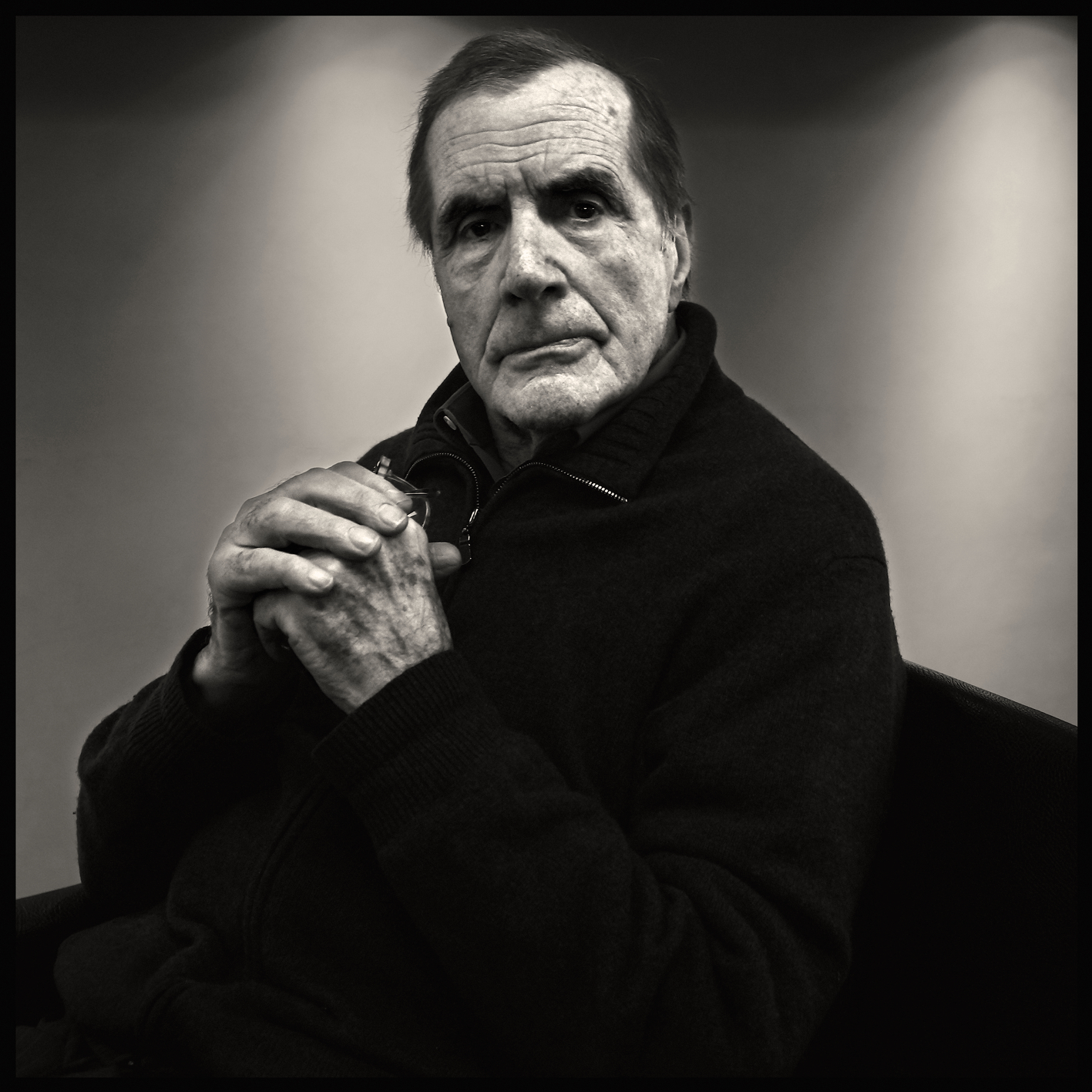
Carlo Giuffrè in 2015, photographed by Augusto De Luca

== Selected filmography ==
- Side Street Story (1950)
- The Steamship Owner (1951)
- Deceit (1952)
- The Machine to Kill Bad People (1952)
- Naples Sings (1953)
- Sunset in Naples (1955)
- The Railroad Man (1956)
- Leoni al sole (1961)
- La bellezza di Ippolita (1962)
- I soldi (1965)
- Trap for Seven Spies (1967)
- The Girl with the Pistol (1968)
- Basta guardarla (1970)
- Ninì Tirabusciò: la donna che inventò la mossa (1971)
- Noi donne siamo fatte così (1971)
- The Inconsolable Widow Thanks All Those Who Consoled Her (1973)
- The Lady Has Been Raped (1973)
- Commissariato di notturna (1974)
- Il trafficone (1974)
- Poker in Bed (1974)
- The Best (1976)
- Scandalo in famiglia (1976)
- Rag. Arturo De Fanti, bancario precario (1980)
- The Skin (1981)
- Son contento (1983)
- Tre colonne in cronaca (1990)
- Pinocchio (2002)
- Bartali: The Iron Man (2006)
