= Casablanca, Casablanca =

- Directed by: Francesco Nuti
- Written by: Luciano Vincenzoni; Sergio Donati; Francesco Nuti
- Produced by: Gianfranco Piccioli
- Starring: Francesco Nuti; Giuliana De Sio
- Cinematography: Franco Di Giacomo
- Music by: Giovanni Nuti
- Release date: 1985
- Running time: 109 min
- Country: Italy
- Language: Italian

Casablanca, Casablanca is a 1985 Italian comedy film written, directed and starred by Francesco Nuti. It is the sequel of The Pool Hustlers.

For his performance Nuti won the David di Donatello for best actor.

== Plot summary ==
Francesco, nicknamed the "Toscano", is a musician who plays in the orchestra with his girlfriend Chiara. But one day Chiara receives a job offer at Casablanca. She then leaves from Tuscany with his conductor, said "the Dark". Francesco gets angry, because he believes that between the two there is a love affair, and chases them in Casablanca.

== Cast ==
- Francesco Nuti as Francesco Piccioli aka "il Toscano"
- Giuliana De Sio as Chiara
- Daniel Olbrychski as Daniel, Chiara's lover
- Domenico Acànfora as Acànfora
- Marcello Lotti as lo Scuro
- Carlo Monni as the barman
- Novello Novelli as Merlo
- Clarissa Burt

== See also ==
- List of Italian films of 1985
