= Noi uomini duri =

1987 film by Maurizio Ponzi

- Theatrical release poster by Renato Casaro
- Directed by: Maurizio Ponzi
- Written by: Leo Benvenuti; Piero De Bernardi; Maurizio Ponzi
- Produced by: Mario & Vittorio Cecchi Gori
- Starring: Enrico Montesano; Renato Pozzetto
- Cinematography: Sandro D'Eva
- Music by: Beppe Cantarelli
- Release date: February 12, 1987 (Italy)
- Country: Italy
- Language: Italian

Noi uomini duri (lit. 'We tough men') is a 1987 Italian comedy film directed by Maurizio Ponzi.

== Plot ==
Mario (Enrico Montesano), a tram-driver, and Silvio (Renato Pozzetto), a banker, make friends in the group of participants in a survival training course. Among evidence of daring, unusual gimmicks to learn and little food, it's a terrible life. But at least there is, for Silvio, the spasm to Cora, the wife of a sort of Rambo, who wins all the various tests of the course.

== Cast ==
- Enrico Montesano: Mario Fortini
- Renato Pozzetto: Silvio
- Isabel Russinova: Cora
- Alessandra Mussolini: Adua
- Novello Novelli: Berno Berni Sr.
- Mariangela Giordano: Teresa
- Maria Pia Casilio: Ines

== Release ==
Noi uomini duri was released theatrically in Italy on February 12, 1987 across several cities including Rome, Milan, Bologna, Turin, and Florence.

== See also ==
- List of Italian films of 1987
