= CRAJ =

CRAJ (and Craj) may refer to:

- Commandos de Recherche et d'Action en Jungle, a French military unit based in French Guiana, according to the list of special forces units
- Centre de recherche et d'analyse juridiques, a French law research center based in the University of Pau, France
- Craj - An Italian documentary film of Teresa De Sio directed by Davide Marengo
