= Giuliana De Sio =

Italian actress

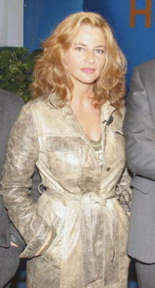
- Born: 2 April 1957 (age 69); Salerno, Italy
- Occupation: Actress
- Years active: 1976–present

Giuliana De Sio (born 2 April 1957) is an Italian actress and the younger sister of pop-folk singer Teresa De Sio. She won two David di Donatello for Best Actress and a Nastro d'Argento for Best Actress.

== Biography and career ==
Giuliana De Sio was born in Salerno and grew up in Cava de' Tirreni, where her family is originally from. She is the daughter of lawyer and essayist Alfonso De Sio and the younger sister of the singer-songwriter Teresa De Sio. De Sio's first public appearance was when she was five years old in a show at Teatro Verdi in Salerno. She moved to Terrasini when she was eighteen to live in a hippy commune. Relocated to Rome, she started a relationship with Alessandro Haber, who encouraged her to take up acting. Her first main role was in 1977 RAI TV film Una donna.

De Sio had her breakout in 1983, when she starred in Massimo Troisi's Scusate il ritardo and alongside Francesco Nuti in Maurizio Ponzi's The Pool Hustlers, that got her a David di Donatello for Best Actress and a Nastro d'Argento for Best Actress. She won a second David di Donatello for Carlo Lizzani's The Wicked.

== Personal life ==
She is an atheist but admires Pope Francis and Saint Januarius.

In March 2020, she was reported to have tested positive for COVID-19, but recovered after a few days.

== Filmography ==
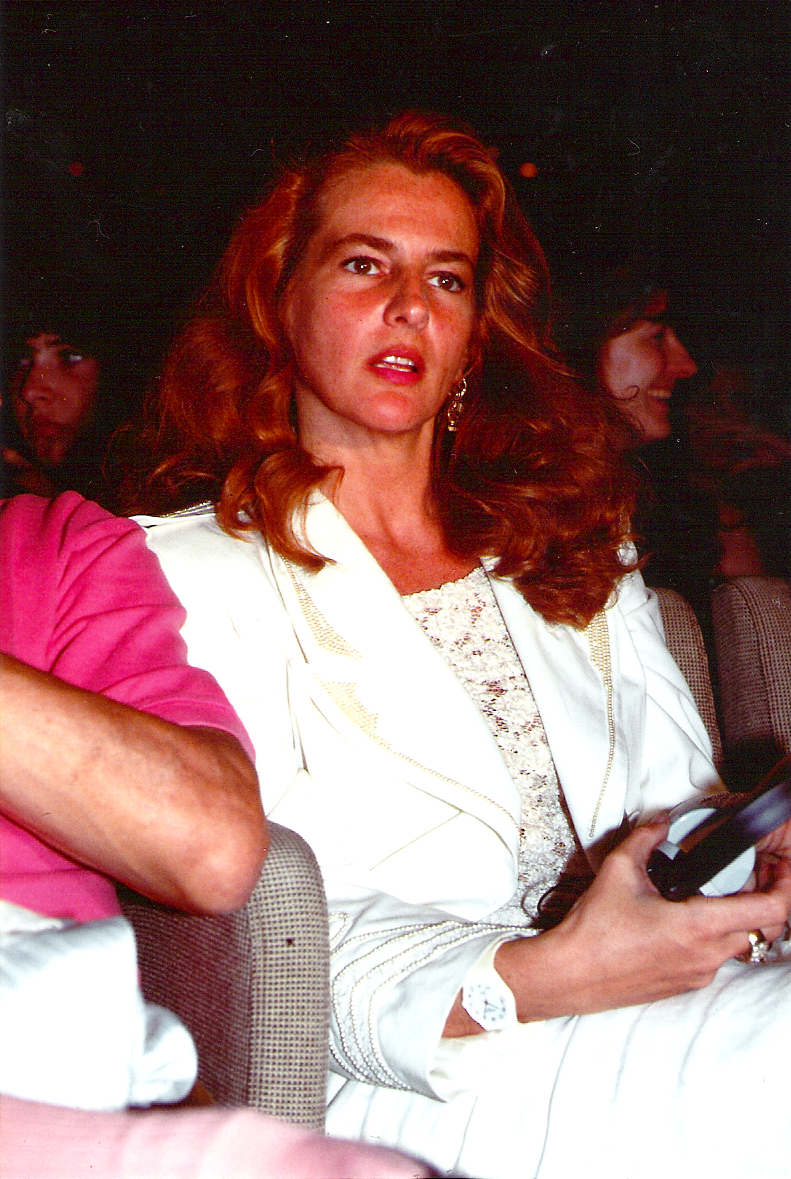
Giuliana De Sio

- Sex for Sale (1976)
- Street of the Crane's Foot (1979)
- Hypochondriac (1979)
- Sciopèn (1982)
- The Pool Hustlers (1983)
- Scusate il ritardo (1983)
- A Proper Scandal (1984)
- Cuore (1985, TV series)
- Casablanca, Casablanca (1985)
- One Hundred Days in Palermo (1984)
- Let's Hope It's a Girl (1986)
- Private Affairs (1987)
- La piovra (season 3, 1987)
- The Rogues (1988)
- What if Gargiulo Finds Out? (1988)
- Feu sur le candidat (1990)
- The Wicked (1991)
- Historical center (1992)
- For not forget (1992)
- Wolffs Revier (1993, TV episode)
- The True Life of Antonio H. (1994)
- Italians (1996)
- With Hate And With Love (1997)
- Besame mucho (1999)
- Mary Magdalene (2000, TV)
- Der Kapitän - Kein Hafen für die Anastasia (2000, TV)
- Il bello delle donne (2001, TV series)
- I Love You Eugenio (2002)
- Chemistry Forever (2002)
- Lights Turn Off (2004)
- The Not Long Night (2006, TV)
- Il console Italiano (2011)
