= Maramao =

- Directed by: Giovanni Veronesi
- Written by: Giovanni Veronesi; Sandro Veronesi
- Produced by: Francesco Nuti
- Starring: Vanessa Gravina
- Cinematography: Gianlorenzo Battaglia
- Edited by: Ugo De Rossi
- Release date: 1987
- Running time: 94 minutes
- Country: Italy
- Language: Italian

Maramao is a 1987 Italian film by Giovanni Veronesi at his directorial debut.

== Cast ==
- Vanessa Gravina as Patrizia
- Maurizio Begotti as Sandro
- Filippo Tempesti as Giannino
- Alberto Frasca as Pippo
- Cristina Sivieri as Chiara
- Romney Williams as Paolo
- Novello Novelli the Lone Sailor
- Carlo Monni
