= The Visionaries (film) =

- Italian: I visionari
- Directed by: Maurizio Ponzi
- Written by: Eduardo de Gregorio
- Screenplay by: Maurizio Ponzi
- Story by: Maurizio Ponzi
- Produced by: Giuseppe Francone
- Starring: Pierluigi Aprà; Adriana Asti
- Cinematography: Angelo Barcella
- Release date: 5 October 1968 (Locarno Film Festival)
- Running time: 95 minutes
- Country: Italy
- Language: Italian

The Visionaries (Italian: I visionari) is a 1968 Italian film directed by Maurizio Ponzi. It won the Golden Leopard at the Locarno International Film Festival and is inspired by the writings by Robert Musil.

== Cast ==
- Pierluigi Aprà
- Adriana Asti
- Lidia Biondi
- Jean-Marc Bory
- Olimpia Carlisi
- Laura De Marchi
- Sergio De Vecchi
- Luigi Diberti
- Fabienne Fabre

== Reception ==
=== Awards ===
1968 Locarno International Film Festival

- Won: Golden Leopard
