= Amami (film) =

1993 film by Bruno Colella

- Directed by: Bruno Colella
- Written by: Bruno Colella; Giovanni Veronesi
- Cinematography: Blasco Giurato
- Music by: Giovanni Nuti
- Release date: 1993
- Running time: 91 minutes
- Country: Italy
- Language: Italian

Amami (literally Love me, also known as Daddy Don't Blush) is a 1993 Italian comedy film directed by Bruno Colella.

== Plot ==
Tullio Venturini, a retired widower, has a daughter, Anna, who is an actress. However, he is the only one not to know that she works in the industry of porn. When he finds out the truth, he goes in full crisis mode. The daughter will be able to rebuild her relationship with him when she makes him participate in a biopic about her career as a hard diva.

== Cast ==
- Moana Pozzi as Anna Venturini
- Novello Novelli as Tullio Venturini
- Nadia Rinaldi as Mary
- Tony Esposito as Marco
- Flavio Bucci as Pagani
- Bruno Colella
- Victor Cavallo
- Eugenio Bennato
- Carlo Buccirosso
- Carlo Monni
- Jeff Blynn
- Massimo Ceccherini

== See also ==
- List of Italian films of 1993
