= Suddenly Paradise =

- Italian theatrical release poster
- Italian: Il paradiso all'improvviso
- Directed by: Leonardo Pieraccioni
- Written by: Leonardo Pieraccioni; Giovanni Veronesi
- Starring: Leonardo Pieraccioni; Angie Cepeda; Alessandro Haber; Rocco Papaleo; Anna Maria Barbera
- Cinematography: Italo Petriccione
- Edited by: Stefano Chierchiè
- Music by: Gianluca Sibaldi
- Release date: 19 December 2003
- Running time: 90 minutes
- Country: Italy
- Language: Italian

Suddenly Paradise (Italian: Il paradiso all'improvviso) is a 2003 Italian comedy film directed by Leonardo Pieraccioni.

== Cast ==
- Leonardo Pieraccioni as Lorenzo
- Angie Cepeda as Amaranta
- Alessandro Haber as Taddeo Borromini
- Rocco Papaleo as Giandomenico Bardella
- Anna Maria Barbera as Nina
- Gea Martire as Veronica
- Giulia Montanarini as Mirna
- Fabrizio Pizzuto as Fausto
- Nunzia Schiano as the Fortuneteller
