= For Love, Only for Love =

- Directed by: Giovanni Veronesi
- Written by: Giovanni Veronesi; Ugo Chiti
- Starring: Diego Abatantuono; Penélope Cruz; Alessandro Haber; Stefania Sandrelli
- Distributed by: Filmauro
- Release date: October 29, 1993
- Running time: 114 minutes
- Country: Italy
- Language: Italian
- Box office: $3.5 million (Italy)

For Love, Only for Love (Italian: Per amore, solo per amore) is a 1993 Italian historical drama film directed by Giovanni Veronesi and starring Diego Abatantuono, Penélope Cruz and Alessandro Haber. It depicts the nativity of Mary.

== Reception ==
The film did well in the run up to Christmas with a gross of over $3.5 million in Italy.

== See also ==
- List of Italian films of 1993
