= Caruso, Zero for Conduct =

- Directed by: Francesco Nuti
- Written by: Francesco Nuti; Carla Giulia Casalini; Ugo Chiti
- Starring: Francesco Nuti; Cecilia Dazzi
- Cinematography: Giovanni Canevari
- Edited by: Ugo De Rossi
- Music by: Riccardo Galardini; Giovanni Nuti
- Distributed by: Medusa Film
- Release date: 9 March 2001
- Running time: 92 minutes
- Country: Italy
- Language: Italian

Caruso, Zero for Conduct (Italian: Caruso, zero in condotta) is a 2001 Italian comedy film directed by Francesco Nuti.

== Cast ==
- Francesco Nuti as Lorenzo Caruso
- Cecilia Dazzi as Olga
- Giulia Serafini as Giulia
- Lorenzo De Angelis as Diego
- Carlo Monni as the farmer
- Mario Patanè as the magistrate
- Ramona Badescu as Trielina
- Antonio Petrocelli as the school principal
- Platinette as the nun
