= Magnificat (film) =

1993 film

- Italian theatrical release poster
- Directed by: Pupi Avati
- Written by: Pupi Avati
- Starring: Luigi Diberti
- Cinematography: Cesare Bastelli
- Edited by: Amedeo Salfa
- Music by: Riz Ortolani
- Release date: 1993
- Running time: 110 minutes
- Country: Italy
- Language: Italian

Magnificat is a 1993 Italian drama film directed by Pupi Avati. It was entered into the 1993 Cannes Film Festival.

== Cast ==
- Luigi Diberti - Lord of Malfole
- Arnaldo Ninchi - Folco
- Massimo Bellinzoni - Baino
- Dalia Lahav - Rozal
- Lorella Morlotti - Venturina
- Massimo Sarchielli - Margherita's Father
- Brizio Montinaro - Lord of Campodose
- Marcello Cesena - Agateo
- Consuelo Ferrara - Abbess
- Eleonora Alessandrelli - Margherita
- David Celli - Bagnaro
- Vincenzo Crocitti - Agnello
- Nando Gazzolo - (voice)
- Dalia Lamav Zagni
- Mario Patanè - Benigno
- Rosa Pianeta
- Lucio Salis
- Andrea Scorzoni - Lord of Manfole
- Sofia Spada - Martinella
