= Io amo Andrea =

- Directed by: Francesco Nuti
- Written by: Ugo Chiti; Francesco Nuti; Carla Giulia Casalini
- Starring: Francesco Nuti; Francesca Neri
- Cinematography: Maurizio Calvesi
- Music by: Giovanni Nuti
- Release date: 2000
- Language: Italian

Io amo Andrea (transl. I Love Andrea) is a 2000 Italian romantic comedy film directed by Francesco Nuti.

== Cast ==
- Francesco Nuti as Dado
- Francesca Neri as Andrea
- Agathe de La Fontaine as Francesca
- Marina Giulia Cavalli as Rossana
- Novello Novelli as the taxi driver
