= Mr. Fifteen Balls =

- Directed by: Francesco Nuti
- Written by: Francesco Nuti; Mario Rellini
- Starring: Francesco Nuti; Sabrina Ferilli
- Cinematography: Danilo Desideri
- Edited by: Ugo De Rossi
- Music by: Giovanni Nuti
- Release date: 1998
- Running time: 100 min
- Country: Italy
- Language: Italian

Mr. Fifteen Balls (Italian: Il Signor Quindicipalle) is a 1998 Italian comedy film directed by Francesco Nuti.

== Plot summary ==
Francesco is a Tuscan who is very good at playing American pool, so much so that he is nicknamed "Mr. Quindicipalle", for the time he performed the unlikely feat of pocketing fifteen (quindici) balls (palle) in one shot, using the wooden handle of a broom as his cue stick. Francesco is also an experienced womanizer, like his recently deceased father. Indeed, Francesco meets the woman of his dreams at his father's funeral – a prostitute who calls herself Sissi. The two fall in love, and so Francesco thinks she might be a lucky charm for him, in his training for a big pool tournament. But Sissi frequently infuriates Francesco, compromising his skill and his training for the tournament.

== Cast ==
- Francesco Nuti as Francesco Di Narnali
- Sabrina Ferilli as Sissi
- Antonio Petrocelli as Giampiero
- Novello Novelli as Maestro
- Laura Torrisi as Francesca
