= Luigi Diberti =

Italian actor (born 1939)

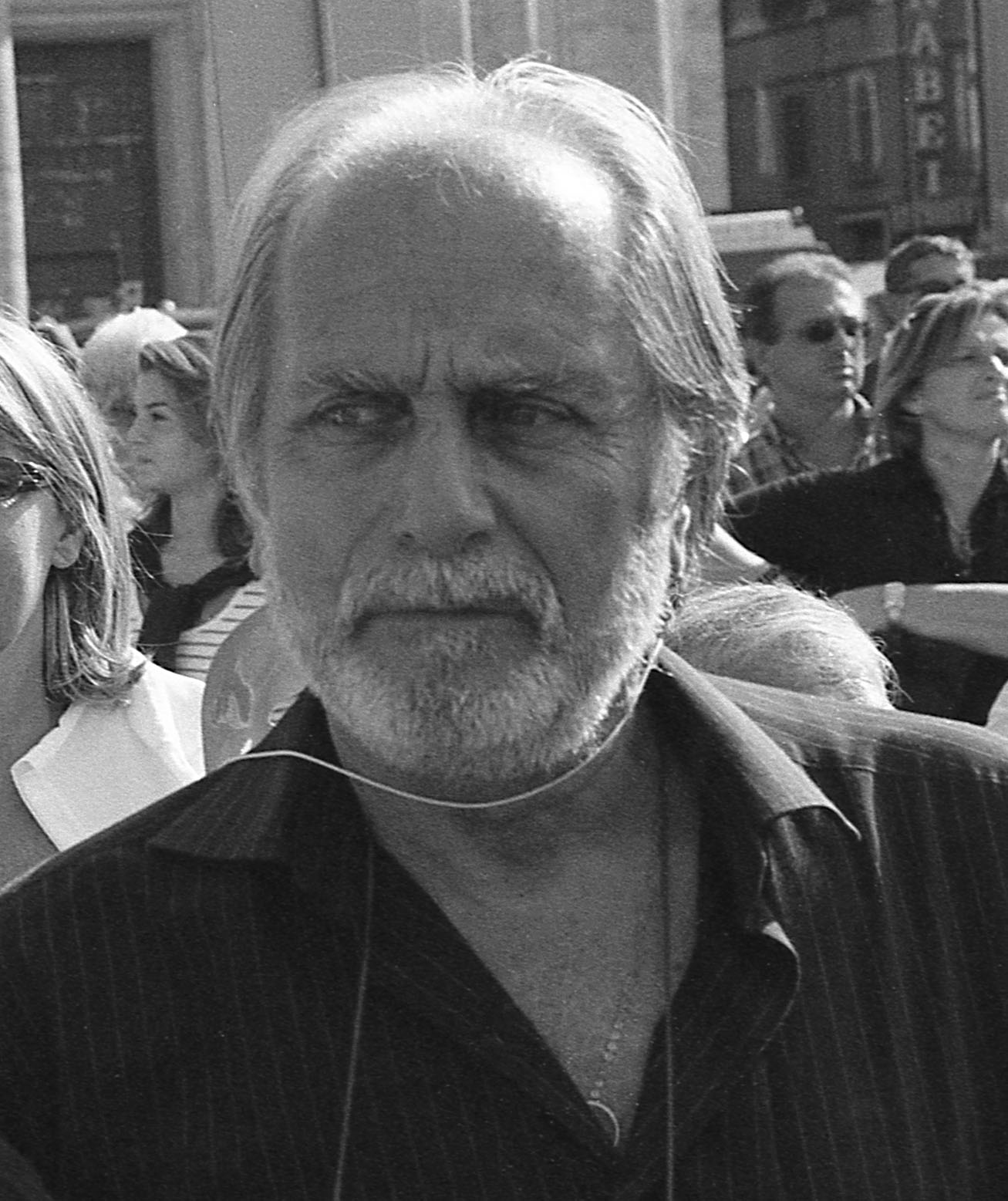
- Born: 29 September 1939 (age 86); Turin, Italy
- Occupation: Actor
- Years active: 1968–present

Luigi Diberti (born 29 September 1939) is an Italian actor and dubber.

After graduating from the National Academy of Dramatic Arts in Rome, he first appeared in small theater roles before having his breakout in 1968 with Luca Ronconi's L'Orlando Furioso.

The same year he made his film debut in Maurizio Ponzi's The Visionaries (1968). Since then, he has appeared in films by Elio Petri, Lina Wertmüller, Michelangelo Antonioni, Dino Risi, and many others. On stage, he worked several times with Giorgio Strehler.

== Selected filmography ==
- The Visionaries (1968)
- Metello (1970)
- The Working Class Goes to Heaven (1971)
- The Seduction of Mimi (1972)
- Beau Masque (1972)
- Libera, My Love (1973)
- Wifemistress (1977)
- Last Feelings (1978)
- The Mystery of Oberwald (1980)
- The Secret (1990)
- Magnificat (1993)
- Immortal Beloved (1994)
- The Stendhal Syndrome (1996)
- Padre Pio: Between Heaven and Earth (2000)
- I Am Emma (2002)
- Clare and Francis (2007)
- Einstein (2008)
- With or Without You (2021)
- The Life Apart (2024)
- Children of the Monkey (2026)
