= Men Men Men =

1995 Italian comedy film

- English DVD cover
- Directed by: Christian De Sica
- Written by: Christian De Sica; Enrico Vanzina; Giovanni Veronesi
- Starring: Christian De Sica; Massimo Ghini; Leo Gullotta; Alessandro Haber; Monica Scattini
- Cinematography: Gianlorenzo Battaglia
- Edited by: Raimondo Crociani
- Music by: Manuel De Sica
- Release date: 2 March 1995 (Italy)
- Running time: 90 minutes
- Country: Italy
- Language: Italian

Men Men Men (Italian: Uomini uomini uomini) is a 1995 Italian LGBT-themed comedy-drama film directed by Christian De Sica. The film, a comedy about four friends, was the first mainstream Italian film dealing with gay lifestyles.

== Cast ==
- Christian De Sica as Vittorio Mannino
- Massimo Ghini as Sandro Di Nepi
- Leo Gullotta as Tony Piraino
- Alessandro Haber as Dado Piccioni
- Monica Scattini as Simonetta
- Paco Reconti as Luca
- Paolo Conticini as Alex Giannetti
- Paolo Gasparini as Michele
- Carlo Croccolo as Peppino
- Fabrizia Sacchi as Anna Farnesi
- Lucia Guzzardi as Tony's mother

== Reception ==
Leo Gullotta announced he was gay during promotion for the film.

The film received poor reviews but opened on 95 screens in Italy and placed third for the weekend behind Nell and Wes Craven's New Nightmare with a gross of 935 million lire ($584,111). In its second weekend it moved to number one.
