= Outlaw (1999 film) =

Ormai è fatta!
- Theatrical release poster
- Directed by: Enzo Monteleone
- Written by: Horst Fantazzini; Angelo Orlando; Enzo Monteleone
- Produced by: Hera International Film; Radiotelevisione Italiana
- Starring: Stefano Accorsi; Fabrizia Sacchi; Emilio Solfrizzi; Antonio Catania
- Cinematography: Arnaldo Catinari
- Music by: Pivio and Aldo De Scalzi
- Distributed by: Columbia TriStar Films Italia
- Release date: 23 April 1999
- Running time: 98 minutes
- Country: Italy
- Language: Italian

Outlaw (Italian: Ormai è fatta!) is a 1999 Italian drama film directed by Enzo Monteleone. It is based on the book by the Italian anarchist Horst Fantazzini. It was entered into the 21st Moscow International Film Festival.

== Plot ==
On July 23, 1973, in the prison of Fossano, Piedmont, the young Horst Fantazzini, detained with a sentence of 22 years, decides that the time has come to try to escape. However, the operation soon turns out to be more difficult than expected, and Horst is forced to take two guards hostage. At this point the jailbreak can be said to have failed in practice, but Horst certainly has no intention of giving up. Thus begins a long day, punctuated by the slow passing of minutes and hours, along which negotiations, hopes, hostage fears, Fantazzini's wife's anxiety, the telephone calls of the lawyer who uselessly advises Horst to surrender, a phone call from his father, who reproaches his son for being a thief without a real motivation unlike when he had specific political and social goals.

== Cast ==
- Stefano Accorsi as Horst Fantazzini
- Giovanni Esposito as guard Di Gennaro
- Emilio Solfrizzi as guard Loiacono
- Antonio Catania as prosecutor D'Onofrio
- Antonio Petrocelli as prison warden Ridolfi
- Fabrizia Sacchi as Anna, wife of Fantazzini
- Paolo Graziosi as carabinieri colonel Tagliaferri
- Alessandro Haber as Fantazzini's lawyer
- Francesco Guccini as Alfonso Fantazzini, father of Horst
