= The Wicked (1991 film) =

- Directed by: Carlo Lizzani
- Written by: Furio Scarpelli; Francesca Archibugi
- Produced by: Piero e Mario Begni per P.A.C.
- Starring: Giuliana De Sio; Julian Sands; Erland Josephson
- Cinematography: Daniele Nannuzzi
- Edited by: Franco Fraticelli
- Music by: Armando Trovajoli
- Distributed by: United International Pictures
- Release date: 1991
- Running time: 98 minutes
- Country: Italy
- Language: English

Cattiva (internationally released as The Wicked) is a 1991 Italian drama film directed by Carlo Lizzani. The film is loosely based on real life events of Carl Jung, the founder of analytical psychology, and of Sabina Spielrein. For this film Giuliana De Sio was awarded a David di Donatello for Best Actress.

== Plot ==
In the early twentieth century, the young Italian-born Emilia Schmidt leads a comfortable life in Switzerland, with her husband and little son Ludwig, but shows from time-to-time signs of mental imbalance.

She is admitted to a luxurious clinic in Zürich, where she receives the diagnosis of schizophrenia due to her behavior, thus being defined as "wicked". However, Professor Gustav, a young assistant to the clinic's head physician, Professor Brokner, becomes passionate about her case; using the innovative research of Dr. Sigmund Freud, he is able to partially cure her. This allows Emilia to leave the clinic, not completely cured, but released from her neuroses and confident in Gustav's promise to continue monitoring her health in the future.

== Cast ==
- Giuliana De Sio as Emilia
- Julian Sands as Gustav
- Erland Josephson as Prof. Brokner
- Milena Vukotic as Annette, a patient in the clinic
- Didi Perego as Chief nurse
- Francesca Ventura as Mitzi, Emilia's maid
- Stefano Lescovelli as Leopold Schmidt, Emilia's husband
- Luisa Maneri as Marta, Emilia's sister
- Massimo Venturiello as Enrico Carossi, Emilia's childhood friend
- Flaminia Lizzani as Anna, Gustav's girlfriend
- Eva Vanicek as Emilia's mother
