= Willy Signori e vengo da lontano =

- Directed by: Francesco Nuti
- Written by: Ugo Chiti; Francesco Nuti; Giovanni Veronesi
- Starring: Francesco Nuti; Isabella Ferrari; Anna Galiena; Alessandro Haber; Cristina Gajoni; Antonio Petrocelli; Giovanni Veronesi; Novello Novelli
- Cinematography: Gianlorenzo Battaglia
- Edited by: Sergio Montanari
- Music by: Giovanni Nuti
- Distributed by: Warner Bros.
- Release date: 1989
- Running time: 105 min
- Country: Italy
- Language: Italian
- Box office: $8.6 million (Italy)

Willy Signori e vengo da lontano is a 1989 Italian romantic comedy film directed by Francesco Nuti.

For his performance Alessandro Haber won the Nastro d'Argento for best supporting actor.

== Plot ==
Willy Signori is a journalist in Milan, bored with his work, involved in a romantic relationship that has no more romance left, only routine, and a paraplegic brother under his care, constantly asking to "move to Africa where the warm climate will help my poor legs". One night, Willy is involved in a car crash, accidentally killing the other car's driver. The following day Lucia, the victim's girlfriends, angrily confronts Willy in his office, accusing him of being a murderer. Willy keeps his cool and tries to financially and morally support Lucia to recover from her shock, as he feels guilty because she is pregnant from the dead boyfriend. Willy tries to support her behind his fiancée's back, and in due time between the two there are sparks of love. After a quarrel, and after breaking up from his relationship, Willy leaves for Africa with his brother for holiday, and there, we see Lucia giving birth in an African clinic, to a baby who most likely will know Willy as his father.

== Cast ==
- Francesco Nuti as Willy Signori
- Isabella Ferrari as Lucia Ventura
- Anna Galiena as Alessandra
- Alessandro Haber as Ugo Signori
- Novello Novelli as the corpse
- Antonio Petrocelli as the gynaecologist
- Cristina Gajoni as Ilona
- Fabrizio Galasso as traffic warden
- Giovanni Veronesi as the window cleaner
- Don Powell as an African doctor

== Reception ==
It was one of the highest-grossing Italian films of the year.
