= The King's Musketeers =

2018 Italian comedy film

- Film poster
- Italian: Moschettieri del re - La penultima missione
- Directed by: Giovanni Veronesi
- Written by: Giovanni Veronesi; Nicola Baldoni
- Produced by: Fabrizio Donvito; Benedetto Habib; Marco Cohen
- Starring: Pierfrancesco Favino; Rocco Papaleo; Valerio Mastandrea; Sergio Rubini; Margherita Buy; Alessandro Haber
- Cinematography: Giovanni Canevari
- Edited by: Consuelo Catucci
- Music by: Checco Zalone
- Release date: 27 December 2018
- Running time: 109 minutes
- Country: Italy
- Language: Italian

The King's Musketeers (Italian: Moschettieri del re - La penultima missione) is a 2018 Italian comedy film directed by Giovanni Veronesi, loosely based on the Alexandre Dumas's novels The Three Musketeers and Twenty Years After.

== Cast ==
- Pierfrancesco Favino as D'Artagnan
- Rocco Papaleo as Athos
- Valerio Mastandrea as Porthos
- Sergio Rubini as Aramis
- Margherita Buy as Queen Anne
- Alessandro Haber as Cardinal Mazarin
- Marco Todisco as King Louis XIV
- Matilde Gioli as the servant
- Federico Ielapi as Antonio
- Valeria Solarino as Cicognac
- Giulia Bevilacqua as Milady de Winter

== Sequel ==
In 2020, a sequel entitled Tutti per uno, uno per tutti ("All for one, one for all!") was announced; filming began in Tuscany on 21 August 2020. Due to the COVID-19 pandemic, the sequel was directly released on Sky Cinema on 25 December 2020.
