= OcchioPinocchio =

- Directed by: Francesco Nuti
- Written by: Ugo Chiti; Francesco Nuti; Giovanni Veronesi
- Produced by: Mario Cecchi Gori; Vittorio Cecchi Gori
- Starring: Francesco Nuti; Chiara Caselli; Joss Ackland
- Cinematography: Maurizio Calvesi
- Edited by: Sergio Montanari
- Music by: Giovanni Nuti
- Distributed by: Variety Distribution
- Release date: December 22, 1994
- Running time: 132 minutes
- Country: Italy
- Language: Italian
- Budget: $10 million
- Box office: $2 million (Italy)

OcchioPinocchio (also spelled as Occhio Pinocchio) is a 1994 Italian comedy film directed by Francesco Nuti.

== Cast ==
- Francesco Nuti as Pinocchio/Leonardo
- Chiara Caselli as Lucy Light
- Joss Ackland as Brando Della Valle
- Victor Cavallo as the hospice manager
- Charles Simon as the lawyer
- Leon Askin as the psychiatrist
- Mel Berger as Gatto
- Jacques Dacqmine as the chief of police
- Pina Cei as Colomba
- Novello Novelli as Segugio

== Reception ==
The film underperformed compared to its budget and grossed $2 million against its $10 million budget.
