= Son contento =

1983 film by Maurizio Ponzi

- Directed by: Maurizio Ponzi
- Cinematography: Carlo Cerchio
- Music by: Carlo Maria Cordio
- Release date: 1983
- Country: Italy
- Language: Italian

Son contento (I'm Happy) is a 1983 Italian drama comedy film directed by Maurizio Ponzi.

For his performance Carlo Giuffrè won the David di Donatello for best supporting actor.

== Cast ==
- Francesco Nuti: Francesco
- Barbara De Rossi: Paola
- Carlo Giuffrè: Falcone
- Novello Novelli: Manager
- Ricky Tognazzi: Postman
