= Vietato ai minori =

- Directed by: Maurizio Ponzi
- Written by: Maurizio Ponzi; Melania Mazzucco; Luigi Guarnieri
- Starring: Alessandro Haber; Mariella Valentini; Massimo Venturiello; Paco Reconti; Angelo Orlando; Nicola Pistoia; Massimo De Rossi; Sabrina Ferilli
- Cinematography: Maurizio Calvesi
- Edited by: Sergio Montanari
- Release date: 1992
- Language: Italian

Vietato ai minori (Forbidden to Minors) is a 1992 Italian comedy film directed by Maurizio Ponzi.

== Plot ==
Officially landed on the Isle of Elba to make a documentary for Rai 1, a crew is actually there to shoot a porn film. The film has to be starred by the diva Edith Costello and by the young actor Salvatore, who is unaware that he had been hired to shoot hardcore scenes. When Salvatore will discover the truth, problems will begin.

== Cast ==
- Alessandro Haber as Scalpo
- Mariella Valentini as Edith Costello
- Massimo Venturiello as Thomas Parker
- Sabrina Ferilli as Barbara
- Angelo Orlando as Arnolds
- Nicola Pistoia as Juan
- Paco Reconti as Salvatore
- Gina Rovere as Ada
- Lidia Biondi as Talent agent

== See also ==
- List of Italian films of 1992
