= The Girl with the Pistol =

1968 film by Mario Monicelli

- Theatrical release poster
- Italian: La ragazza con la pistola
- Directed by: Mario Monicelli
- Screenplay by: Rodolfo Sonego; Luigi Magni
- Story by: Rodolfo Sonego
- Produced by: Gianni Hecht Lucari
- Starring: Monica Vitti; Stanley Baker; Corin Redgrave; Anthony Booth; Carlo Giuffrè
- Cinematography: Carlo Di Palma
- Edited by: Ruggero Mastroianni
- Music by: Peppino De Luca
- Production company: Documento Film
- Distributed by: Euro International Films
- Release dates: 15 July 1968 (SSIFF); 20 September 1968 (Italy)
- Running time: 100 minutes
- Country: Italy
- Language: Italian

The Girl with the Pistol (Italian: La ragazza con la pistola) is a 1968 Italian comedy film directed by Mario Monicelli and starring Monica Vitti, with Stanley Baker, Corin Redgrave, Anthony Booth, and Carlo Giuffrè in supporting roles. It was nominated for the Academy Award for Best Foreign Language Film. Vitti won the David di Donatello for Best Actress.

The film tackles the themes of bride kidnapping and honour killing, which were still relevant in the Southern Italian culture of the time and normalised to some extent by Italian law, and had then only recently been challenged when Franca Viola publicly refused to marry the man who raped her.

== Plot ==
In a Sicilian seaside village, young Assunta Patanè is walking down the street with her mother and cousin when two henchmen in a car kidnap her and take her to an outbuilding, where Vincenzo Macaluso explains that he was actually trying to kidnap her cousin Concetta. Assunta confesses that she has long been in love with Vincenzo and demands that he marry her. As Vincenzo takes Assunta's virginity, he becomes doubtful of her chastity since she is an exceptionally good kisser.

The next morning, Assunta awakens to find Vincenzo gone and is soon told by her relatives that she is now a fallen woman who has dishonoured her family, since Vincenzo has refused to marry her. Local customs dictate that Assunta and her sisters cannot marry until a male relative kills the offender and restores the family's honour. Because there are no men in her family, Assunta takes matters into her own hands and, armed with a pistol, leaves for the United Kingdom in pursuit of Vincenzo.

In Edinburgh, Assunta seeks out Vincenzo at an Italian restaurant where he is working, but he flees before she can find him. While Assunta is working as a housemaid for a local couple, Vincenzo calls her from Sheffield, telling her to leave him alone and declaring that he would never marry a "whore" like her. Assunta promptly travels to Sheffield and meets John, an Englishman, who takes her to a party where Vincenzo evades her before she can see him.

The next day, after Assunta fails to find Vincenzo at a coffeehouse he frequents, John offers to drive her to Bath, where he is playing a rugby match. There, Assunta spots Vincenzo in his new job as a stretcher bearer and follows him to the local hospital, but faints after witnessing an operation. To earn money, Assunta donates blood to Frank Hogan, a student who is admitted to the hospital after attempting suicide.

As Frank accompanies Assunta in her search for Vincenzo, two Sicilian men inform her that Vincenzo has died in an accident and show her his grave. She is distraught, unable to salvage her honour. Impressed by Assunta's intensity, Frank proposes to her, and she accepts. However, she learns from Dr Osborne, the physician who treated both Assunta and Frank in the hospital, that Frank is gay and attempted suicide over another man. Osborne encourages Assunta to stay in England and become independent.

One day, after spotting Vincenzo with another woman, Assunta follows the two to Royal Victoria Park and blindly shoots at Vincenzo, but accidentally hits the woman instead. The woman, who turns out to be Osborne's wife, is rushed to the hospital, where a frantic Vincenzo proclaims that Assunta is trying to kill him. Although Osborne is angry with Assunta for shooting his wife, he helps her escape by putting her on a plane back to Italy. Instead, Assunta boards a plane to London.

Some time later, Assunta encounters Osborne, who has moved to London and is in the process of divorcing his wife. Vincenzo, who is also in London, calls Assunta and asks to see her, but she rebuffs him. After learning that Tom is on holiday in Jersey, Assunta sets off to meet him, but is informed that the next ferry will not depart until the following morning due to stormy weather. Checking into a hotel in Brighton, Assunta receives a call from Osborne, and they arrange to meet the next day.

Assunta is surprised by Vincenzo, who explains that he wants a woman who belongs to him and that because of that one night they spent together, he still has a claim on her. They end up in Assunta's hotel room, where Vincenzo proposes to her, and she vows to give up her freedom for him as they have sex. The next morning, Assunta exacts revenge on Vincenzo by abandoning him and taking a ferry to meet Osborne. After failing to catch up with Assunta, Vincenzo calls her a "whore" as the ferry leaves.

== Cast ==
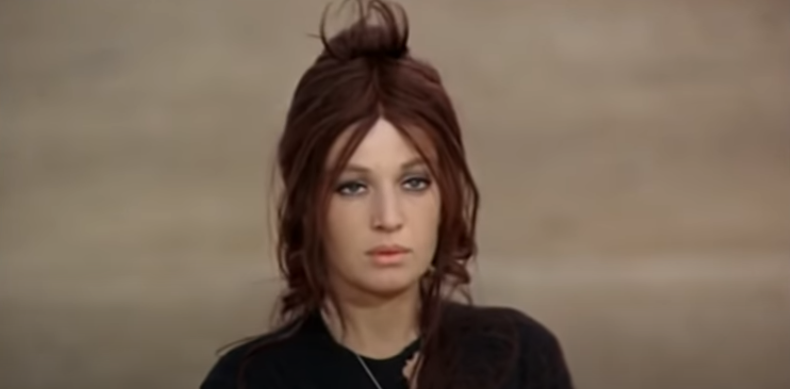
Monica Vitti as Assunta in the film

- Monica Vitti as Assunta Patanè
- Stanley Baker as Dr Osborne
- Corin Redgrave as Frank Hogan
- Anthony Booth as John
- Carlo Giuffrè as Vincenzo Macaluso
- Nicolina Papetti (credited as Nicolina Verrelli) as Concetta
- Tiberio Murgia as Sicilian man #1
- Aldo Puglisi as Sicilian man #2
- Stefano Satta Flores as the waiter at the Capri restaurant
- Helen Downing as Ada
- Dominic Allan as Mr Sullivan
- Deborah Stanford as Mrs Sullivan (uncredited)
- Catherine Feller as Rosina Canunzio (uncredited)
- Janet Brandes as nurse (uncredited)
- Natasha Harwood as Mrs Osborne (uncredited)
- Johnny Briggs as the cad at the dance (uncredited)
- Yutte Stensgaard as the blonde at the party (uncredited)

== Production ==
The early Sicilian scenes were actually shot in Polignano a Mare in Apulia, not in Sicily. Filming locations in Edinburgh included Waverley station, Princes Street, Lawnmarket and Castle Terrace, while in Sheffield several scenes were shot in Granville Street and near the site of the former Neepsend railway station, as well as at the now redeveloped bus station in nearby Rotherham. Other landmarks shown in the film include the Clifton Suspension Bridge in Bristol; Royal Crescent in Bath; Holy Trinity Church in Bradford-on-Avon, Wiltshire; the Elephant and Castle, Royal Albert Hall, Chelsea Embankment and Lincoln's Inn Fields in London; and the Royal Pavilion and Grand Hotel in Brighton. The final scene, which features Assunta escaping from Vincenzo's clutches and onto a car ferry, was filmed separately in Newhaven and Ancona.

== Reception ==
=== Box office ===
The Girl with the Pistol was wildly popular in Italy, garnering nearly $4 million in box office receipts by June 1969, and was regarded as heralding the emergence of Monica Vitti as one of the country's leading comic stars. In the United Kingdom, the film was not shown in cinemas.

== See also ==
- List of submissions to the 41st Academy Awards for Best Foreign Language Film
- List of Italian submissions for the Academy Award for Best Foreign Language Film
