= The Barber of Rio =

- Directed by: Giovanni Veronesi
- Written by: Ugo Chiti; Giovanni Veronesi
- Starring: Diego Abatantuono
- Cinematography: Maurizio Calvesi
- Edited by: Nino Baragli
- Music by: Irene Grandi; Dado Parisini; Telonio
- Distributed by: Cecchi Gori
- Release date: 18 October 1996
- Running time: 105 minutes
- Country: Italy
- Language: Italian
- Box office: 5.2 billion lira (Italy)

The Barber of Rio (Italian: Il barbiere di Rio) is a 1996 Italian comedy film directed by Giovanni Veronesi.

== Cast ==
- Diego Abatantuono as Matteo
- Zuleika Dos Santos as Giorginha
- Rocco Papaleo as Ugo
- Giuseppe Oristanio as Rocco
- Margaret Mazzantini as Silvia
- Renata Fronzi as Angelina
- Dario Tata as Alex
- Claudio Bignone as Simone
- Antonio Petrocelli as the policeman
- Irene Grandi as Guardian angel
- Mauro Di Francesco, Nini Salerno and Ugo Conti as Italians in Rio

== Reception ==
By 30 November, the film had grossed 5.2 billion lira in Italy.
