= Love at First Sight (1985 film) =

- Directed by: Marco Risi
- Written by: Marco Risi; Massimo Franciosa
- Starring: Jerry Calà
- Cinematography: Giuseppe Maccari
- Edited by: Raimondo Crociani
- Music by: Manuel De Sica
- Production company: Numero Uno Cinematografica
- Distributed by: Columbia Pictures
- Release date: 1985
- Country: Italy
- Language: Italian

Love at First Sight (Italian: Colpo di fulmine) is a 1985 Italian comedy film directed by Marco Risi.

== Plot ==
At the age of thirty Carlo is a chronic and complex boy, in full existential crisis, left by his wife for a more mature and self-confident man, and fired from a job he has never loved. Having reached the limit of endurance, he decides to change scenery for a while and, accepting the invitation of his historic friend Massimo, he leaves Rome to spend a few weeks in Venice, the city where man has rebuilt his life. Massimo also has a bankruptcy story behind him, from which his 11-year-old daughter Giulia was born.

Carlo has not seen his friend's daughter for some years, and when he meets Giulia for the first time, he is strangely struck. Even the girl immediately shows a strong sympathy towards her father's young friend, with a very different character compared to the adults she knows. The time spent in the lagoon soon leads Carlo to forget his ex-girlfriend, while the commitments of his parents mean that Giulia ends up spending most of her days in the company of Carlo: his adolescent soul, sometimes childish, and the character of her, a decidedly precocious child compared to her young age, means that between the two there is an unforeseeable "love at first sight". Although it is only a platonic fall in love, as absurd as it is childish, Giulia is excited by the thing since this is her first, true love, while on the contrary Carlo is upset by the fact that he has taken a crush on a girl, moreover the daughter of his best friend .

He decides all the same to confess everything to Massimo, who obviously doesn't take it well. Nonetheless, Carlo and Giulia continue dating, living a bizarre "relationship" that is a little more than a friendship, a little less than a love, but over time all the differences that separate an adult inevitably emerge. a little girl. A simple quarrel after a spite of Giulia turns out to be enough to expose the absurdity of the state of things, writing an end to this unlikely situation. Giulia thus chooses to accept the court of one of her classmates, while Carlo, however matured as a person out of this Venetian "adventure", once back to everyday life finds a way to win back his ex-wife.

== Cast ==
- Jerry Calà: Carlo
- Vanessa Gravina: Giulia
- Ricky Tognazzi: Massimo
- Elisabetta Giovannini: Silvia
- Valeria D'Obici: Anna
- Franca Scagnetti: Attilia

== See also ==
- List of Italian films of 1985
