= Il volpone =

- Directed by: Maurizio Ponzi
- Written by: Maurizio Ponzi; Ottavio Jemma; Piero De Bernardi; Leo Benvenuti
- Story by: Ben Jonson
- Starring: Enrico Montesano; Enrico Maria Salerno; Renzo Montagnani; Athina Cenci; Alessandro Haber; Mariangela Giordano; Eleonora Giorgi
- Cinematography: Sandro D'Eva
- Music by: Fabio Liberatori
- Distributed by: CDI
- Release date: 1988
- Language: Italian

Il volpone is a 1988 Italian comedy film directed in by Maurizio Ponzi, inspired by Ben Jonson's comedy with the same name. The film stars Enrico Montesano, Enrico Maria Salerno and Paolo Villaggio.

== Plot ==
Set in the Ligurian Riviera during the 1980s, it features Paolo Villaggio as Ugo Maria Volpone, a rich but apparently ill ship company owner. He is surrounded by a series of relatives and friends (played by Enrico Maria Salerno, Renzo Montagnani, Alessandro Haber) who blandish him in order to inherit his estate. The shrewd Volpone, in return, organizes a hoax against them to betray their greed. In the movie, he is joined by a new waiter, Bartolomeo Mosca (Enrico Montesano), who quickly shows himself to be as cunning as Volpone in arranging humiliations.

== Cast ==
- Enrico Montesano as Bartolomeo Mosca
- Enrico Maria Salerno as Ciro Corvino
- Renzo Montagnani as Raffaele Voltore
- Athina Cenci: Marta Corbaccio
- Alessandro Haber a Ernesto Corbaccio
- Mariangela Giordano as Eliana Voltore
- Eleonora Giorgi as Francesca Corvino
- Paolo Villaggio as Ugo Maria Volpone
- Maurizio Donadoni as Aldo Marignano
- Sabrina Ferilli as Rosalba Marignano
