= Caruso Pascoski, Son of a Pole =

1988 film by Francesco Nuti

- Directed by: Francesco Nuti
- Written by: David Grieco; Francesco Nuti; Giovanni Veronesi
- Starring: Francesco Nuti
- Edited by: Sergio Montanari
- Music by: Giovanni Nuti
- Production company: Cecchi Gori Group
- Distributed by: Columbia Tri-Star Films Italia
- Release date: 16 December 1988
- Running time: 102 minute
- Country: Italy
- Language: Italian

Caruso Pascoski, Son of a Pole (Italian: Caruso Pascoski di padre polacco) is a 1988 Italian comedy film directed by Francesco Nuti.

== Cast ==
- Francesco Nuti as Caruso Pascoski
- Clarissa Burt as Giulia Pascoski
- Ricky Tognazzi as Edoardo Mariotti
- Antonio Petrocelli as Caruso's lawyer
- Novello Novelli as the carabinieri marshal
- Carlo Monni as the snoring man
- Narcisa Bonati as the toilet woman
- Giovanni Veronesi as the nerd
