= What a Ghostly Silence There Is Tonight =

- Directed by: Maurizio Ponzi
- Written by: Francesco Nuti; Elvio Porta
- Starring: Francesco Nuti
- Cinematography: Carlo Cerchio
- Edited by: Sergio Montanari
- Music by: Barluna; Carlo Maria Cordio; Francesco Nuti
- Release date: September 1982
- Running time: 93 minutes
- Country: Italy
- Language: Italian

What a Ghostly Silence There Is Tonight (Italian: Madonna che silenzio c'è stasera) is a 1982 Italian comedy film directed by Maurizio Ponzi.

== Cast ==
- Francesco Nuti as Francesco
- Edy Angelillo as Maria
- Massimo Sarchielli as Magnifico
- Gianna Sammarco as the mother
- Mario Cesarino as Filippo
- Novello Novelli as Chiaramonti
- Sergio Forconi as the man on the bus
- Riccardo Tognazzi as Don Valerio
