= All the Fault of Paradise =

1985 film

- Directed by: Francesco Nuti
- Written by: Vincenzo Cerami; Francesco Nuti; Giovanni Veronesi
- Cinematography: Giuseppe Ruzzolini
- Edited by: Francesco Frigeri
- Music by: Giovanni Nuti
- Production companies: C.G. Silver Film; Union P.N.
- Distributed by: Columbia Pictures Italia
- Release date: December 20, 1985
- Language: Italian

All the Fault of Paradise (Italian: Tutta colpa del paradiso) is a 1985 Italian romance-comedy film directed by Francesco Nuti.

For his performance Nuti won the Ciak d'oro for best actor.

== Premise ==
A former convict seeks to reconnect with his son, who has been adopted by a couple in the mountains.

== Cast ==
- Francesco Nuti: Romeo Casamonica
- Ornella Muti: Celeste
- Roberto Alpi: Alessandro
- Marco Vivio: Lorenzo
- Laura Betti: Director
- Bobby Rhodes: Sonny
- Novello Novelli: Hotel keeper
- Silvia Annichiarico: Wanda
- Alessandro Partexano: Mario
- Patrizia Tesone: Guardian

== See also ==
- List of Italian films of 1985
