= Mamma Ebe =

- Directed by: Carlo Lizzani
- Written by: Iaia Fiastri; Gino Capone; Carlo Lizzani
- Produced by: Giovanni Di Clemente
- Starring: Stefania Sandrelli; Barbara De Rossi; Ida Di Benedetto; Alessandro Haber; Cassandra Domenica; Laura Betti; Paolo Bonacelli
- Cinematography: Romano Albani
- Edited by: Franco Fraticelli
- Music by: Franco Piersanti
- Release date: 1985
- Language: Italian

Mamma Ebe (Mother Ebe) is a 1985 courtroom drama film directed by Carlo Lizzani. It was entered into the main competition at the 42nd Venice International Film Festival, in which Barbara De Rossi won the Pasinetti Award for best actress. Based on real events, the film was poorly received by critics.

== Cast ==
- Berta D. Dominguez as Mamma Ebe (credited as Cassandra Domenica)
- Stefania Sandrelli as Sandra Agostini
- Barbara De Rossi as Laura Bonetti
- Ida Di Benedetto as Maria Pia Sturla
- Alessandro Haber as Mario Bonetti
- Laura Betti as Lidia Corradi
- Paolo Bonacelli as Don Paolo Monti
- Giuseppe Cederna as Bruno Corradi
- Carlo Monni as Foschi
- Massimo Sarchielli as Oste
- Luigi Pistilli as Roberto Lavagnino
- Maria Fiore as Mara
- Enzo Robutti as Bishop
- Federico Sangirardi Wardal as Don Franco
- Néstor Garay as the judge
