= Vanessa Gravina =

Italian actress (born 1974)

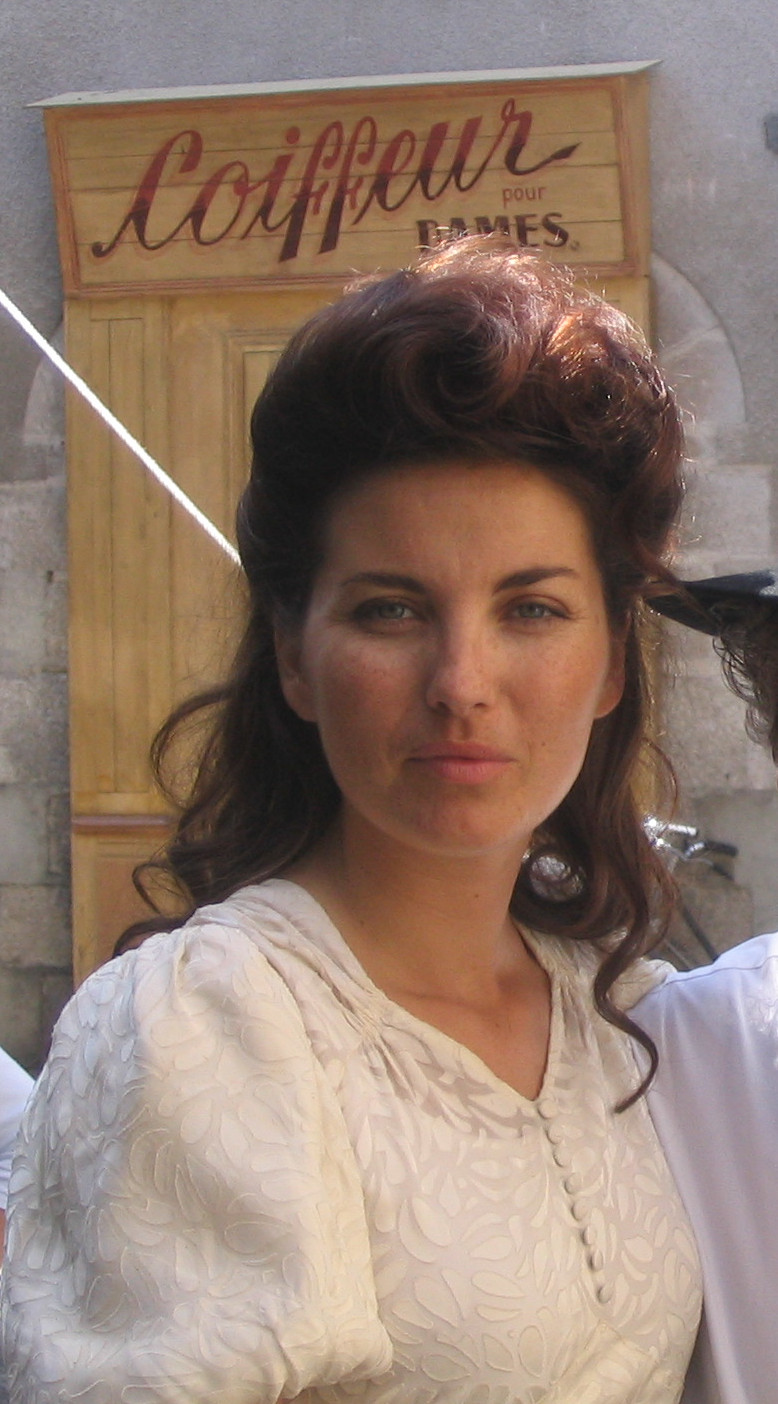
- Vanessa Gravina in 2006
- Born: 4 January 1974 (age 52); Milan, Italy
- Occupation: Actress

Vanessa Gravina (born 4 January 1974) is an Italian film, television and stage actress and director.

Born in Milan, Gravina debuted as a child actress in 1985, starring opposite Jerry Calà in the Marco Risi's romantic comedy Love at First Sight. For her performance she was nominated for Silver Ribbon for best new actress. In the following years she kept starring in films while continuing her studies at the Liceo linguistico. Starting in the late 1980s she gradually focused on television, where she got her main successes. She is also active on stage, where she worked with Dacia Maraini and Giorgio Strehler, among others.

She considers herself Buddhist.

== Filmography ==
=== Cinema ===
- Colpo di fulmine, directed by Marco Risi (1985)
- Maramao, directed by Giovanni Veronesi (1987)
- 32 dicembre, directed by Luciano De Crescenzo (1988)
- Abbronzatissimi 2 - Un anno dopo, directed by Bruno Gaburro (1993)
- Dietro la pianura, directed by Gerardo Fontana and Paolo Girelli (1994)
- La ragazza di Cortina, directed by Maurizio Vanni (1994)
- Italiani, directed by Maurizio Ponzi (1996)
- Milonga, directed by Emidio Greco (1999)
- Les gens en maillot de bain, directed by Eric Assous (2001)
- Rien que du bonheur, directed by Denis Parent (2003)
- L'inferno secondo noi, directed by Giovanni Giacobelli – short film (2005)
- L'uomo privato, directed by Emidio Greco (2007)
- Principessa part time, directed by Giorgio Arcelli (2008)
- Il patto, directed by Giuseppe Recchia (2020)
- Come ogni mattina, directed by Claudio Rossi Massimi - short film (2024)

=== Televisione ===
- La voglia di vincere, directed by Vittorio Sindoni (1987)
- Don Tonino - 6 episodes (1988)
- Due fratelli, directed by Alberto Lattuada (1988)
- La piovra 4, directed by Luigi Perelli (1989)
- Laura and Luis, directed by Frank Strecker (1989)
- La piovra 5 - Il cuore del problema, directed by Luigi Perelli (1990)
- Manuela (1991)
- Micaela (1992)
- Camilla, parlami d'amore (1992)
- Come quando fuori piove, directed by Bruno Gaburro (1998)
- Ricominciare (2000–2001)
- Gioco a incastro, directed by Enzo G. Castellari – film TV (2000)
- Incantesimo - 29 episodes (2001–2002)
- CentoVetrine (2003–2004)
- Sospetti 3 (2005)
- Gente di mare - 28 episodes (2005–2007)
- Commissaire Valence (2006)
- Pompei, ieri, oggi, domani, directed by Paolo Poeti (2007)
- Les camarades, directed by François Luciani (2007)
- Butta la luna 2 (2009)
- Un caso di coscienza - 6 episodes (2009)
- Madre, aiutami, directed by Gianni Lepre (2014)
- Il bello delle donne...alcuni anni dopo - 2 episodes (2017)
- Furore – 8 episodes (2018)
- Il paradiso delle signore (2018 - )

== Theatre ==
=== Actress ===
- The lady from the sea, by Henrik Ibsen, directed by Giorgio Strehler (1991)
- In caso di matrimonio rompere il vetro, by Robert Thomas, directed by Fabio L. Lionello (1996)
- Nella città l'inferno, directed by Dacia Maraini and Francesco Tavassi (1997)
- Pilato sempre, by Giorgio Albertazzi, directed by Armando Pugliese (2002)
- Trojan women, by Euripides, directed by Livio Galassi (2003)
- Electra, by Sophocles, directed by Walter Manfrè (2004)
- La vita che ti diedi, by Luigi Pirandello, directed by Luigi Squarzina (2004)
- Oresteia, by Aeschylus, directed by Livio Galassi (2004)
- Rudens, by Plautus, directed by Walter Manfrè (2005)
- Agata, by Rocco Familiari, directed by Walter Manfrè (2005)
- Amores, Amandi, directed by Milo Vallone (2005)
- Fröken Julie, by August Strindberg, directed by Armando Pugliese (2007–2009)
- Vestire gli ignudi, by Luigi Pirandello, directed by Walter Manfrè (2008–2010)
- Capitan Ulisse, di Alberto Savinio, directed by Giuseppe Emiliani (2009)
- Fra... intendimenti d'amore, by Edoardo Siravo (2009–2015)
- The Taming of the Shrew, by William Shakespeare, directed by Armando Pugliese (2010–2012)
- Antigone, di Sophocles, directed by Federico Vigorito (2011)
- Rousseau e La serva padrona, directed by Dora Liguori e Giancarlo Zanetti (2013)
- Farse plautine, directed by Luca Cairati (2013)
- Barefoot in the park, by Neil Simon, directed by Stefano Artissunch (2013–2015)
- Carmen, Medea, Cassandra, directed by Luciano Cannito (2014)
- Diario di sé - Nel labirinto di Anais Nin, by Luca Cedrola, directed by Bruno Garofalo (2015)
- Lysistrata, di Aristophanes, directed by Cristiano Roccamo (2015)
- Nina, by André Roussin, directed by Pino Strabioli e Patrick Rossi Gastaldi (2015)
- Les bonnes, by Jean Genet, directed by Giovanni Anfuso (2016–2017)
- Queste pazze donne, by Gabriel Barylli, directed by Stefano Artissunch (2017–2018)
- Il piacere dell'onestà, by Luigi Pirandello, directed by Liliana Cavani (2018–2020)
- Tartuffe, by Molière, directed by Roberto Valerio (2019-2020-2023)
- Uncle Vanya, by A. Chekhov, directed by Roberto Valerio (2022)
- Witness for the prosecution, by Agatha Christie, directed by Geppy Gleijeses (2022–2024)

=== Director ===
- Il combattimento di Tancredi e Clorinda, madrigal by Claudio Monteverdi (2019)
