= Stregati =

- Directed by: Francesco Nuti
- Written by: Vincenzo Cerami; Francesco Nuti; Giovanni Veronesi
- Starring: Francesco Nuti; Ornella Muti
- Cinematography: Giuseppe Ruzzolini
- Edited by: Sergio Montanari
- Music by: Giovanni Nuti
- Production companies: C.G. Silver Film; Union P.N.
- Distributed by: Columbia Pictures Italia
- Release date: 19 December 1986
- Country: Italy
- Language: Italian

Stregati (Bewitched) is a 1986 Italian romantic comedy film directed by Francesco Nuti.

For this film Giovanni Nuti won the Nastro d'Argento for best score.

== Plot ==
Lorenzo is a dj who lives in Genoa, in a loft near the port; he conducts a nocturnal radio program for Radio Strega, keeping company, with his words and sentences, for those who suffer from insomnia or work at night. His philosophy of life, as well as that of his student friends (a taxi driver and a pianist) and his father (manager of a cinema where pornographic films are broadcast), is to fight monotony, always trying to have fun, often even breaking the rules and some female hearts.

Every night, in fact, after work, Lorenzo and his friends wander around the city, combining all kinds of jokes and experiencing occasional adventures. On a rainy night, while driving his friend's taxi, Lorenzo meets Anna, a beautiful girl with whom he ends up in bed; however she is about to get married and is in the Ligurian capital only to buy the wedding dress and then leave for Verona, where her future husband awaits her.

However, the two spend together almost all the time she stays and, between them, a particular relationship is established, poised between attraction and repulsion, but intense. Thus, Anna misses the train of return twice and only on the third attempt does she manage to leave again, not before having had sex with Lorenzo again. After a few days, however, when everything seems to be over, Anna returns and returns to Lorenzo, willing to be with him and ready to share his bizarre and messy lifestyle.

== Cast ==
- Francesco Nuti as Lorenzo
- Ornella Muti as Anna
- Novello Novelli as Novello
- Alex Partexano as Alex
- Mirta Pepe as Clara
- Sergio Solli as Remo Quaranta

== See also ==
- List of Italian films of 1986
