= Teresa De Sio =

Italian pop-folk singer and songwriter

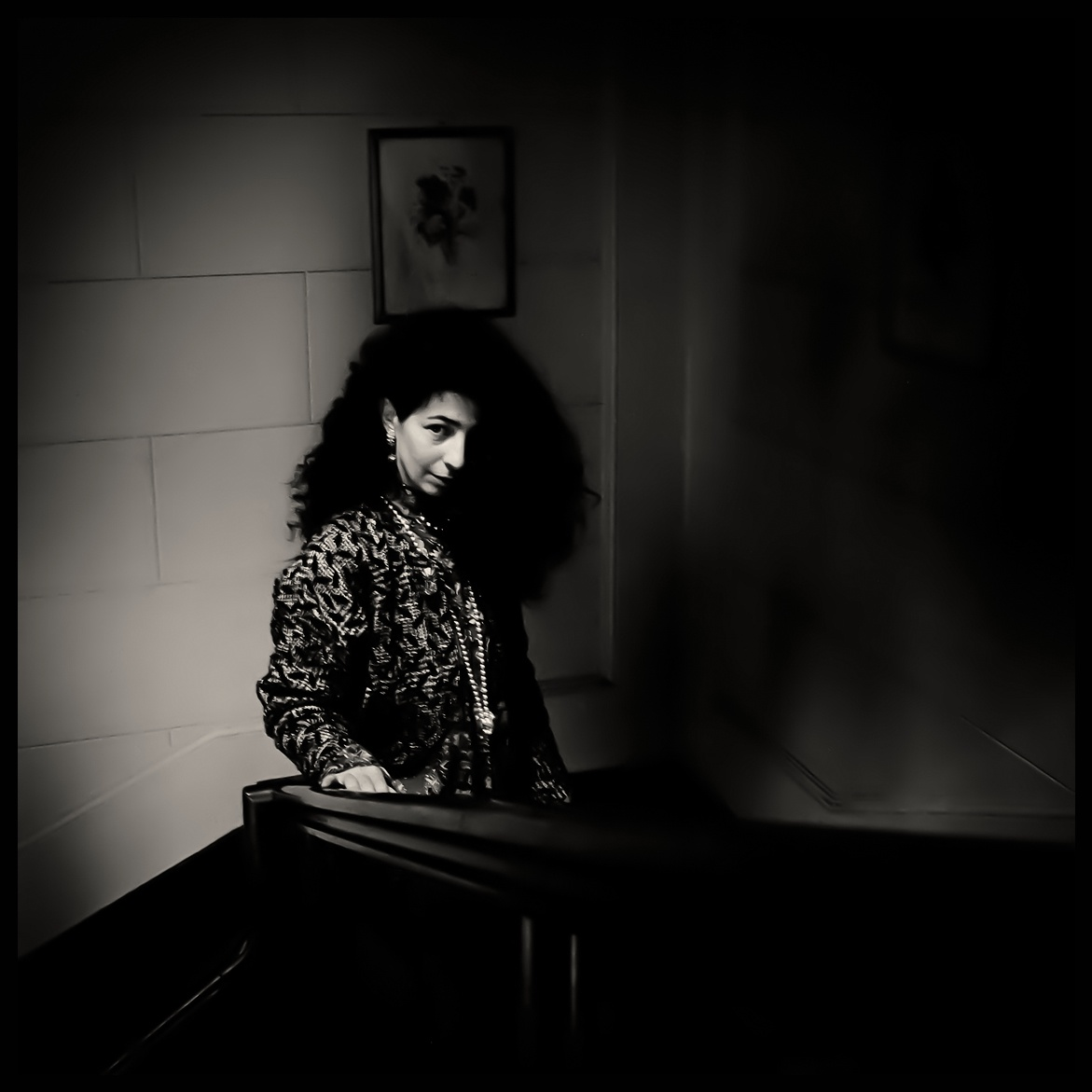
- De Sio in 1987, photographed by Augusto De Luca

Background information
- Born: 3 November 1952 (age 73)
- Origin: Naples, Italy
- Genres: Folk
- Occupation: Singer-songwriter
- Instruments: Vocals, guitar
- Years active: 1976–present
- Label: Philips Records
- Website: www.teresadesio.com

Teresa De Sio (born 3 November 1952) is an Italian pop-folk singer and songwriter. She is the elder sister of actress Giuliana De Sio.

== Life and career ==
Teresa De Sio was born in Naples and grew up in Cava de' Tirreni, where her family was originally from. Between the ages of 5 and 11 studied dance at the San Carlo theater school. After some acting experiences, in 1976 she started her career as a vocalist with Eugenio Bennato's musical project Musicanova, a group which focused on Neapolitan folk music.

In 1980 she launched her solo career with Sulla terra sulla luna, an album that combines folk, jazz and rock, and in which she debuted as lyricist. Her second album Teresa De Sio, that include De Sio's signature songs "Voglia 'e turnà" and "Aumm aumm", was sung in Neapolitan, and was met with critical and commercial success, selling over 500,000 copies. Her third album Tre (1982), sold over 400,000 copies.

De Sio collaborated with Brian Eno for her two albums Africana (1985) and Sindarella suite (1988), which include a 16 minutes suite, "La storia vera di Lupita Mendera", composed with Eno and Michael Brook and performed with Piero Pelù. In between, there is an album of covers of classic Canzone Napoletana songs, Toledo and Regina. In the 1990s her work became more politically engaged. In her 1995 album Un libero cercare she worked with Fabrizio De André and Fiorella Mannoia.

In 2003 performed, along with Stewart Copeland and Vittorio Cosma at "La Notte della Taranta" in Melpignano. In 2005 De Sio participated to the 62nd Venice International Film Festival with the documentary Craj (Note: Meaning "tomorrow" in various Southern Italian dialects.) The film was directed by Davide Marengo, and went on to win the Lino Micciché Prize.

During her career De Sio received awards and various honours, notably a Targa Tenco in 1988 for the song "'A neve e 'o sole".

== Discography ==
=== Solo albums ===
- 1980 – Sulla terra sulla luna
- 1982 – Teresa De Sio
- 1983 – Tre
- 1985 – Africana
- 1986 – Toledo e regina
- 1988 – Sindarella suite
- 1991 – Ombre rosse
- 1993 – La mappa del nuovo mondo
- 1995 – Un libero cercare
- 1997 – Primo viene l'amore
- 1999 – La notte del Dio che balla (Note: Various singers.)
- 2004 – A Sud! A Sud!
- 2007 – Sacco e fuoco
- 2011 - Tutto cambia
- 2017 - Teresa canta Pino
- 2019 - Puro desiderio

=== With Musicanova ===
- 1976 - Garofano d'ammore
- 1978 - Musicanova
- 1978 – Villanelle Popolaresche del '500 (Note: Some sources indicate this album as a solo album by De Sio, but it is instead part of the Musicanova project.)
- 1979 - Quanno turnammo a nascere

=== Compilation albums ===
- 1991 – Voglia 'e turnà
- 1998 – Successi
- 2002 – Voglia 'e turnà e altri successi
- 2006 – Primo viene l'amore: Le più belle canzoni di Teresa De Sio
- 2012 – Primo viene l'amore: Mediterranea

=== Singles ===
- 1980 – "'O Sole Se Ne Va"
- 1985 – "Tamburo"
- 1988 – "Bocca Di Lupo"
- 1995 – "Animali Italiani"
- 2011 – "Inno Nazionale" / "Non Dormo Mai Tutta La Notte" / "Padroni E Bestie"
