= The Pool Hustlers =

1982 Italian comedy-drama film

The Pool Hustlers a.k.a. Io, Chiara e lo scuro
- Theatrical release poster
- Directed by: Maurizio Ponzi
- Written by: Francesco Nuti; Franco Ferrini; Enrico Oldoini; Maurizio Ponzi
- Produced by: Gianfranco Piccioli; Marco Valsania
- Starring: Francesco Nuti
- Cinematography: Carlo Cerchio
- Edited by: Sergio Montanari
- Music by: Carlo Maria Cordio
- Release date: 1982
- Running time: 103 minutes
- Country: Italy
- Language: Italian

The Pool Hustlers (Italian: Io, Chiara e lo Scuro, "I, Chiara and lo Scuro") is a 1982 Italian comedy drama film directed by Maurizio Ponzi. It was screened in the Un Certain Regard section at the 1983 Cannes Film Festival. It was co-written by Ponzi, male lead Francesco Nuti and established screenwriters Franco Ferrini and Enrico Oldoini. The symbolic names of the characters mentioned in the Italian title, "Chiara" and "lo Scuro", mean "Claire", and "the Dark One", respectively. Highly successful in Italy, and noted for the spectacular billards scenes performed by Francesco Nuti himself and the legend of italian-style billards Marcello "Lo Scuro" Lotti,like the iconic "royal ottavina " shot.

== Cast ==
- Francesco Nuti as Francesco Piccoli a.k.a. "il Toscano" ("the Tuscan")
- Giuliana De Sio as Chiara
- Marcello Lotti (as himself) - "lo Scuro" ("the Dark One")
- Antonio Petrocelli as Mancino
- Novello Novelli (as Novellantonio Novelli) - Merlo
- Renato Cecchetto as Giovanni
- Claudio Casale
- Carlo Neri
- Claudio Spadaro
- Stefano Cuneo
- Pierangelo Pozzato (as Pietro Angelo Pozzato)
