= Women in Skirts =

- Directed by: Francesco Nuti
- Written by: Ugo Chiti; Francesco Nuti; Giovanni Veronesi
- Cinematography: Giuseppe Ruzzolini
- Music by: Giovanni Nuti
- Distributed by: Filmauro
- Release date: 1991
- Language: Italian
- Box office: $11.7 million (Italy)

Women in Skirts (Italian: Donne con le gonne) is a 1991 Italian romantic comedy film directed by Francesco Nuti. It was the highest-grossing Italian film in Italy in 1992. The film was nominated for two awards, Best Supporting Actress and Best Costume Design.

== Cast ==
- Francesco Nuti as Renzo Calabrese
- Carole Bouquet as Margherita
- Barbara Enrichi as Renzo's mother
- Cinzia Leone as Cinzia
- Gastone Moschin as lawyer Carabba
- Didi Perego as Pubblico Ministero
- Daniele Dublino as count Ugolino
