= My Life with Stars and Stripes =

- Directed by: Massimo Ceccherini
- Written by: Massimo Ceccherini; Giovanni Veronesi
- Produced by: Fulvio Lucisano; Federica Lucisano
- Starring: Massimo Ceccherini; Victoria Silvestedt
- Cinematography: Massimo Ceccherini
- Edited by: Massimo Ceccherini
- Release date: October 2003
- Running time: 110 minutes
- Countries: Italy; United States
- Language: Italian

My Life with Stars and Stripes is a 2003 film directed by and starring Massimo Ceccherini, released in Italian cinemas on October 31, 2003.

== Plot ==
The placid life of Lando (Massimo Ceccherini), tuscan peasant is shocked by the sudden return of an aunt, who emigrated to the United States thirty years before, became a fat irreducible by appetite. She is accompanied by her husband, an ex-marine crazy, Vietnam veteran, who knows by memory Apocalypse Now and gets up every morning at five, by his grandson, a nuisance affected by the mania of video games and, fortunately, even the shapely daughter (Victoria Silvestedt) who intriguing Lando. The American guests don't renounce to their habits: jogging; Halloween party, military march at 5 a.m., roast turkey for the Thanksgiving holiday, etc.. Lando, having reached the limit of endurance, it explodes and releases everything, but eventually the appeal of United States involves too.
