= Il tenente dei carabinieri =

1986 film by Maurizio Ponzi

- Directed by: Maurizio Ponzi
- Written by: Leo Benvenuti; Piero De Bernardi; Maurizio Ponzi
- Produced by: Mario Cecchi Gori & Vittorio Cecchi Gori
- Starring: Nino Manfredi; Enrico Montesano; Massimo Boldi
- Cinematography: Carlo Cerchio
- Edited by: Antonio Siciliano
- Music by: Bruno Zambrini
- Production company: C.G. Silver Film
- Distributed by: Columbia Pictures
- Release date: 1986
- Running time: 110 min
- Country: Italy
- Language: Italian

Il tenente dei carabinieri (The lieutenant of Carabinieri) is a 1986 Italian crime-comedy film directed by Maurizio Ponzi.

== Plot ==
The Lieutenant of Carabinieri Duilio Cordelli often quarrels with his Commander Colonel Vinci. When the two must investigate two suspects of murder, Duilio discovers that a gang of thieves plan to cover a major bank heist in Rome with a traffic of counterfeit notes.

== Cast ==
- Enrico Montesano: Lt. Duilio Cordelli
- Nino Manfredi: Colonel Vinci
- Massimo Boldi: Brigadier Nautico Lodifè
- Marisa Laurito: Wife of Cordelli
- Mattia Sbragia: Domenico Vasaturo
- Nuccia Fumo: Mother of Cordelli
- Bruno Corazzari: Augusto Lorenzini
