= Isabel Russinova =

Bulgarian-born Italian actress, producer and television personality

- Born: Maria Isabella Cociani; 20 January 1958 (age 67); Sofia, Bulgaria
- Occupation(s): Actress, television presenter, model
- Years active: 1980s-present

Isabel Russinova (Bulgarian: Изабел Русинова; born 20 January 1958) is a Bulgarian-born Italian actress, producer and television personality.

== Biography ==
Born in Sofia as Maria Isabella Cociani, Russinova came to the success in 1983 with the Rai Uno musical show Discoring. The same year, she co-hosted the Sanremo Music Festival. She later hosted several television programs, and she appeared as an actress in a number of films and TV-series. Russinova is also the artistic director of the film, television and theater production company Ars Millennia and the director of the Bravo theater festival.

After her experience as a model and popularity in the eighties in the television and cinema field, she is today a cultural operator, playwright, writer and producer of cinema and theater.

Her attention to social, equal opportunity and the defense of human rights, have led to be today the official testimonial of Amnesty International.

== Bibliography ==
Year	Italian title	Publishing
2005	Ti racconto quattro storie	RAI Libri
2009	Antonio, l'isola e la balena	RAI Libri
2011	Galla Placida. L'imperatrice romana che governò i barbari	
2016	Reinas. Storie di grandi donne	Armando Curcio Editore
