= Alessandro Haber =

Italian actor, film director and singer (born 1947)

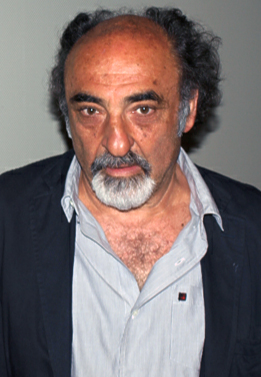
- Alessandro Haber in 2010
- Born: 19 January 1947 (age 79); Bologna, Italy
- Occupations: actor, comedian, director, songwriter
- Years active: 1967 – present
- Height: 1.73 m (5 ft 8 in)
- Spouse: Antonella Bavaro
- Children: 1
- Website: Alessandrohaber

Alessandro Haber (born 19 January 1947) is an Italian actor, film director and singer.

Haber was born in Bologna in a Jewish family of mixed ancestry (his father was a Romanian Jew and his mother Italian) and spent his childhood in Israel. His movie debut was in 1967 with China Is Near by Marco Bellocchio. His first leading role was in Pupi Avati's Christmas Present.

Haber directed his only movie in 2003 with Scacco pazzo.

He is also a distinguished theatre actor, having performed amongst others in Orgia by Pier Paolo Pasolini, Woyzeck by Georg Büchner, The Miser by Molière, Uncle Vanya by Anton Chekhov, Dialogo by Natalia Ginzburg and A Servant of Two Masters by Carlo Goldoni.

He has been touring theatres since 2006 with Tango d'amore e di coltelli, with music by Ástor Piazzolla, based on a text by Jorge Luis Borges.

He has won three Nastro d'Argento, one David di Donatello, one Premio Gassman, one Premio IDI and one theatre critics' award. In 2021, the actor was also awarded the Special Nastro d'Argento 2021.

As a singer, he has released three albums: Haberrante, Qualcosa da dichiarare and Il sogno di un uomo. His greatest success was the single "La valigia dell'attore", written for him by Francesco De Gregori.

In June 2011, Haber attempted to kiss actress Lucia Lavia onstage during a rehearsal for Othello at the Teatro Romano di Verona. She responded by slapping him and he immediately slapped her back while accusing her of being "cold." After the intervention of both their lawyers, the theater forced Haber to leave the production and he was replaced by Franco Branciaroli.

In 2017, he has interpreted Gabriele Tinti's poetry giving voice to the masterpieces in the National Archaeological Museum, Naples and in the Capitoline Museums.

== Selected filmography ==
=== As an actor ===
- 1967 - China Is Near
- 1969 - Youth March
- 1969 - Under the Sign of Scorpio
- 1970 - The Conformist
- 1970 - Corbari
- 1971 - Eneide
- 1971 - Lover of the Great Bear
- 1972 - Who Saw Her Die?
- 1975 - Cagliostro
- 1975 - Mondo candido
- 1976 - Pure as a Lily
- 1976 - Victory March
- 1976 - Quanto è bello lu murire acciso
- 1978 - Tough to Kill
- 1978 - Goodbye & Amen
- 1978 - Ligabue
- 1981 - Bollenti spiriti
- 1981 - Sweet Dreams
- 1981 - Sweet Pea
- 1982 - All My Friends Part 2
- 1982 - Sogni mostruosamente proibiti
- 1982 - Ehrengard
- 1983 - Fantozzi subisce ancora
- 1983 - Flirt
- 1983 - Dream of a Summer Night
- 1985 - The Two Lives of Mattia Pascal
- 1985 - Mamma Ebe
- 1986 - Christmas Present
- 1986 - Grandi Magazzini
- 1987 - Da grande
- 1987 - Man on Fire
- 1988 - Il volpone
- 1989 - Willy Signori e vengo da lontano
- 1989 - The Story of Boys & Girls
- 1991 - The Professional Secrets of Dr. Apfelgluck
- 1992 - Parenti serpenti
- 1992 - Vietato ai minori
- 1993 - Pacco, doppio pacco e contropaccotto
- 1993 - For Love, Only for Love
- 1994 - The True Life of Antonio H.
- 1994 - Love Burns
- 1995 - Men Men Men
- 1995 - Bits and Pieces
- 1995 - The Graduates
- 1995 - Snowball
- 1996 - The Cyclone
- 1996 - Return to Home Gori
- 1997 - Fireworks
- 1998 - Simpatici & antipatici
- 1998 - Kaputt Mundi
- 1999 - Dirty Linen
- 1999 - Outlaw
- 1999 - Falkehjerte
- 2002 - A Journey Called Love
- 2003 - Scacco pazzo
- 2003 - Suddenly Paradise
- 2003 - Life as It Comes
- 2004 - Christmas Rematch
- 2005 - Raul: Straight to Kill
- 2006 - The Unknown Woman
- 2006 - The Roses of the Desert
- 2007 - Peopling the Palaces at Venaria Reale
- 2007 - Seven Kilometers from Jerusalem
- 2008 - Albakiara
- 2008 - Sandrine in the Rain
- 2009 - Christine Cristina
- 2011 - The Cardboard Village
- 2012 - Il sogno del maratoneta
- 2013 - The Fifth Wheel
- 2017 - Agadah
- 2018 - As Needed
- 2018 - Youtopia
- 2018 - The King's Musketeers
- 2019 - Il signor Diavolo
- 2021 - We Still Talk
- 2022 - Caravaggio's Shadow
- 2024 - Romeo Is Juliet

=== As a director ===
- 2003: Scacco pazzo

== Discography ==
- 1995: Haberrante
- 1999: Qualcosa da dichiarare
- 2003: Il sogno di un uomo

== Awards ==
- Premio IDI (best actor) 1980 (Dialogo)
- Nastro d'Argento (best supporting actor) 1990 (Willy Signori e vengo da lontano)
- Nastro d'Argento (best supporting actor) 1994 (Per amore, solo per amore)
- David di Donatello (best supporting actor) 1994 (Per amore, solo per amore)
- Nastro d'Argento (best actor) 1995 (La vera vita di Antonio H.)
- Theatre critics' award 1996 (Arlecchino)
- Premio Gassman (best theatre actor) 2006 (Zio Vania)
