= Maurizio Ponzi =

Italian film director

- Born: 8 May 1939 (age 87); Rome, Italy
- Occupations: Film director, screenwriter
- Years active: 1968 - 2012

Maurizio Ponzi (born 8 May 1939) is an Italian film director, screenwriter and cinema critic.

Born in Rome, he wrote cinema reviews in several Italian magazines during the early 1960s. He worked as assistant director in Pier Paolo Pasolini's episode in Amore e rabbia and directed a series of documentaries in 1967–1968.

He has directed 22 films between 1968 (his debut film I visionari won a prize in the Locarno Festival) and 2012. His film The Pool Hustlers (Io, Chiara e lo Scuro, one of three featuring Francesco Nuti that Ponzi directed in the early 1980s) was screened in the Un Certain Regard section at the 1983 Cannes Film Festival.

== Selected filmography ==
- The Visionaries (1968)
- Equinozio (1971)
- Il caso Raoul (1975)
- The Pool Hustlers (1982)
- What a Ghostly Silence There Is Tonight (1982)
- Son contento (1983)
- Aurora (1984)
- Il tenente dei carabinieri (1986)
- Noi uomini duri (1987)
- Il volpone (1988)
- Volevo i pantaloni (1990)
- Vietato ai minori (1992)
- Anche i commercialisti hanno un'anima (1994)
- Italiani (1996)
- Fratelli coltelli (1997)
- Besame mucho (1999)
- A luci spente (2004)
- Ci vediamo a casa (2012)
