= Francesco Nuti =

Italian actor (1955–2023)

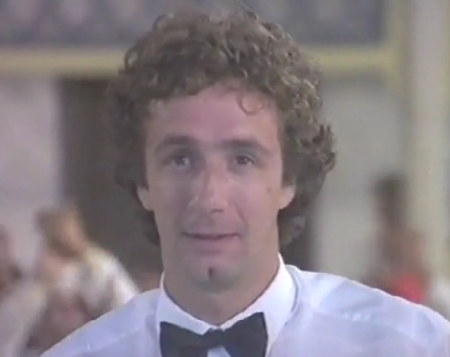
- Nuti in 1985
- Born: 17 May 1955; Florence, Italy
- Died: 12 June 2023 (aged 68); Rome, Italy
- Occupations: Actor; film director; screenwriter
- Years active: 1982–2005
- Height: 1.76 m (5 ft 9 in)
- Children: Ginevra

Francesco Nuti (17 May 1955 – 12 June 2023) was an Italian actor, film director and screenwriter.

== Biography ==
Born in Prato, Nuti began his professional career as an actor in the late 1970s, when he formed the cabaret group Giancattivi together with Alessandro Benvenuti and Athina Cenci. The group took part in the TV shows Black Out and Non Stop for RAI TV, and shot their first feature film, West of Paperino (1981), written and directed by Benvenuti.

The following year Nuti abandoned the trio and began a solo career with three movies directed by Maurizio Ponzi: What a Ghostly Silence There Is Tonight (1982), The Pool Hustlers (1982) and Son contento (1983). Starting in 1985, he began to direct his movies, scoring an immediate success with the films Casablanca, Casablanca and All the Fault of Paradise (1985), Stregati (1987), Caruso Pascoski, Son of a Pole (1988), Willy Signori e vengo da lontano (1989) and Women in Skirts (1991). In 1988 he also participated at the Sanremo Festival with the song "Sarà per te", later recorded by Mina. In 1992 he sang with Mietta in "Lasciamoci respirare", written by singer-songwriter Biagio Antonacci.

The 1990s were however a period of decline for the Tuscan director, with unsuccessful movies such as OcchioPinocchio (1994), Mr. Fifteen Balls (1998), Io amo Andrea (2000) and Caruso, Zero for Conduct (2001). In the following years Nuti also started to suffer from depression and alcoholism.

=== Accident and permanent disability ===
On 2 September 2006, shortly before he was due to begin filming a new project—reportedly titled Olga e i fratellastri Billi—Nuti was admitted to Policlinico Umberto I in Rome after a serious fall down the stairs at his home. The accident caused a subdural hematoma that resulted in severe brain damage, leaving him unable to speak or move. In the years that followed, several appearances on Italian television showed the extent of his disability in public, prompting strong emotional reactions from fans as well as criticism from those who regarded those broadcasts as an exploitative use of the former director's condition. On 21 September 2016, a second fall led to his being hospitalized again in critical condition. In July 2017, after reaching the age of majority, Nuti's daughter Ginevra became his legal guardian. Nuti died on 12 June 2023, at the age of 68.

== Legacy and Tribute ==
On 17 May 2025, at 11:30, For the 70th birth anniversary of Francesco Nuti, the municipality of Florence placed a marble plaque in memory at the place where he was born in Via Sant'Antonino 23, Florence.

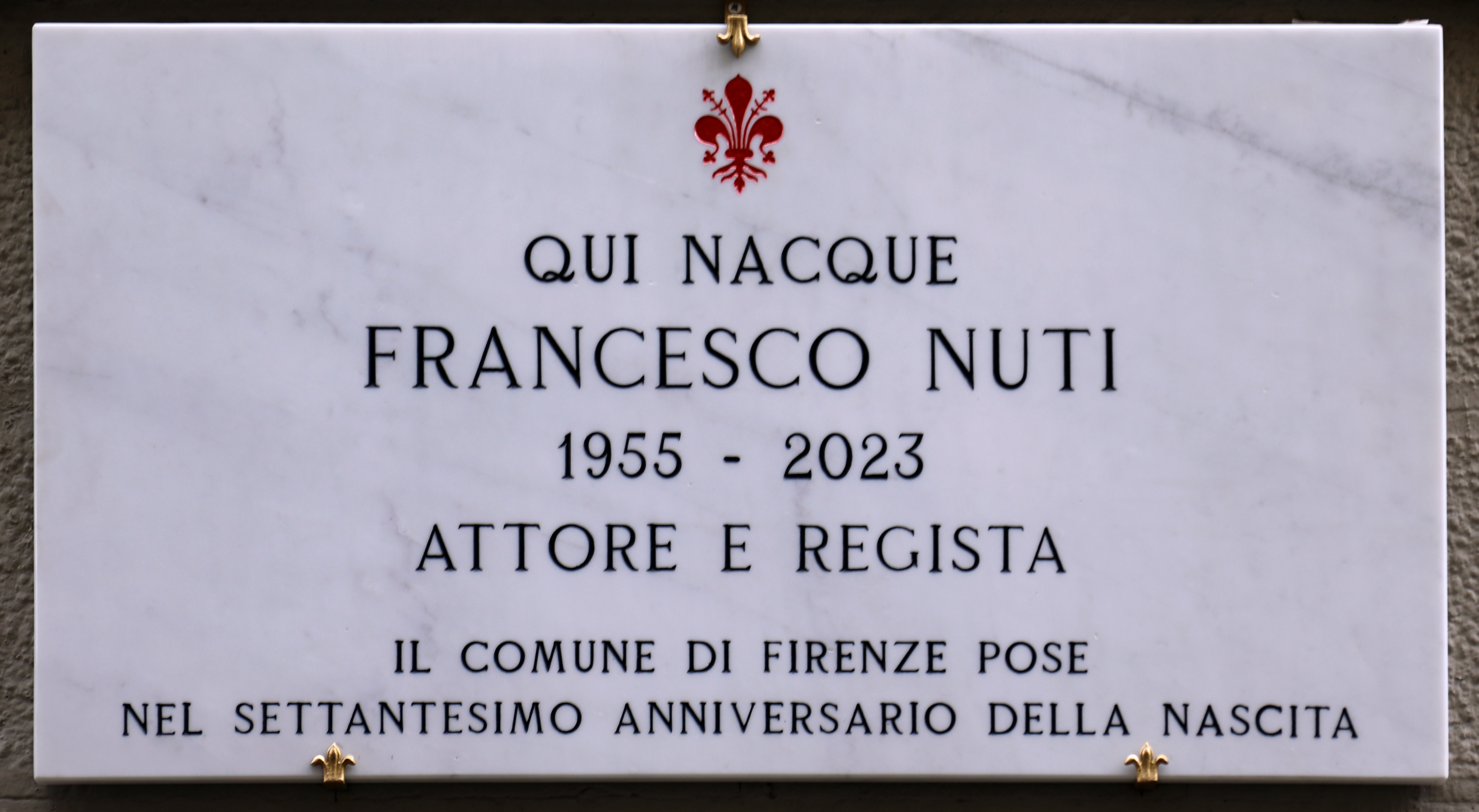
Marble plaque placed in memory of the place where Francesco Nuti was born in Via Sant'Antonino 23, Florence, placed by the municipality of Florence in 2025.

But in reality, as Nuti himself stated in an interview with Archivio Luce Cinecittà, he was born in his grandmother's house at Via Ottavio Rinuccini 14. Via Sant'Antonino 23 was certainly the place of residence during his early childhood until six year old and the place of birth of his brother, Giovanni Nuti.

== Filmography ==
=== Director ===
- All the Fault of Paradise (1985)
- Casablanca, Casablanca (1985)
- Stregati (1987)
- Caruso Pascoski, Son of a Pole (1988)
- Willy Signori e vengo da lontano (1989)
- Women in Skirts (1991)
- OcchioPinocchio (1994)
- Mr. Fifteen Balls (1998)
- Io amo Andrea (2000)
- Caruso, Zero for Conduct (2001)

=== Screenwriter ===
- What a Ghostly Silence There Is Tonight (1982)
- The Pool Hustlers (1982)
- Son contento (1983)
- Casablanca, Casablanca (1985)
- All the Fault of Paradise (1985)
- Stregati (1987)
- Caruso Pascoski, Son of a Pole (1988)
- Willy Signori e vengo da lontano (1989)
- Women in Skirts (1991)
- OcchioPinocchio (1994)
- Mr. Fifteen Balls (1998)
- Io amo Andrea (2000)
- Caruso, Zero for Conduct (2001)

=== Actor ===
- West of Paperino (1982)
- What a Ghostly Silence There Is Tonight (1982)
- The Pool Hustlers (1982)
- Son contento (1983)
- Sogni e bisogni (1984, TV)
- Casablanca, Casablanca (1985)
- All the Fault of Paradise (1985)
- Stregati (1987)
- Caruso Pascoski, Son of a Pole (1988)
- Willy Signori e vengo da lontano (1989)
- Women in Skirts (1991)
- OcchioPinocchio (1994)
- Mr. Fifteen Balls (1998)
- Io amo Andrea (2000)
- Caruso, Zero for Conduct (2001)
- Concorso di colpa (2005)

=== Producer ===
- Maramao (1987)
- Io amo Andrea (2000)
