= 52nd David di Donatello =

2007 Italian film awards

- Date: 14 June 2007
- Site: GranTeatro, Rome, Italy
- Hosted by: Tullio Solenghi

Highlights
- Best Picture: The Unknown Woman
- Most awards: The Unknown Woman (5)
- Most nominations: The Unknown Woman (12)

Television coverage
- Network: Rai 2

The 52nd David di Donatello ceremony, presented by the Accademia del Cinema Italiano, was held on 14 June 2007.

== Winners and nominees ==
Best Film: The Unknown Woman – directed by Giuseppe Tornatore; Along the Ridge – directed by Kim Rossi Stuart; Golden Door – directed by Emanuele Crialese; My Brother Is an Only Child – directed by Daniele Luchetti; One Hundred Nails – directed by Ermanno Olmi	Best Producer: Donatella Botti for BIANCAFILM and Rai Cinema – Salty Air; Fabrizio Mosca – Golden Door; Medusa Film – The Unknown Woman; Cattleya – My Brother Is an Only Child; Luigi Musini, Roberto Cicutto for Cinemaundici – One Hundred Nails
Best Director: Giuseppe Tornatore – The Unknown Woman; Ermanno Olmi – One Hundred Nails; Marco Bellocchio – The Wedding Director; Emanuele Crialese – Golden Door; Daniele Luchetti – My Brother Is an Only Child	Best New Director: Kim Rossi Stuart – Along the Ridge; Alessandro Angelini – Salty Air; Francesco Amato – Ma che ci faccio qui; Giambattista Avellino, Ficarra e Picone – Il 7 e l'8; Davide Marengo – Night Bus
Best Actor: Elio Germano – My Brother Is an Only Child; Vincenzo Amato – Golden Door; Michele Placido – The Unknown Woman; Giacomo Rizzo – The Family Friend; Kim Rossi Stuart – Along the Ridge	Best Actress: Kseniya Rappoport – The Unknown Woman; Margherita Buy – Saturn in Opposition; Donatella Finocchiaro – The Wedding Director; Giovanna Mezzogiorno – Flying Lessons; Laura Morante – Liscio
Best Supporting Actor: Giorgio Colangeli – Salty Air; Ninetto Davoli – One Out of Two; Ennio Fantastichini – Saturn in Opposition; Valerio Mastandrea – Napoleon and Me; Riccardo Scamarcio – My Brother Is an Only Child	Best Supporting Actress: Ambra Angiolini – Saturn in Opposition (ex aequo); Angela Finocchiaro – My Brother Is an Only Child (ex aequo); Michela Cescon – Salty Air; Sabrina Impacciatore – Napoleon and Me; Francesca Neri – A Dinner for Them to Meet
David di Donatello for Best Screenplay: Daniele Luchetti, Sandro Petraglia, Stefano Rulli – My Brother Is an Only Child; Linda Ferri, Francesco Giammusso, Kim Rossi Stuart, Federico Starnone – Along the Ridge; Emanuele Crialese – Golden Door; Giuseppe Tornatore – The Unknown Woman; Ermanno Olmi – One Hundred Nails	Best Cinematography: Fabio Zamarion – The Unknown Woman; Alessandro Pesci – Napoleon and Me; Luca Bigazzi – The Family Friend; Agnès Godard – Golden Door; Fabio Olmi – One Hundred Nails
Best Production Design: Carlos Conti – Golden Door; Francesco Frigeri – Napoleon and Me; Tonino Zera – The Unknown Woman; Giuseppe Pirrotta – One Hundred Nails; Andrea Crisanti – The Lark Farm	Best Score: Ennio Morricone – The Unknown Woman; Teho Teardo – The Family Friend; Neffa – Saturn in Opposition; Franco Piersanti – My Brother Is an Only Child; Fabio Vacchi – One Hundred Nails
Best Original Song: "La paranza" and "Mi persi" from Night Bus – Daniele Silvestri; "Fascisti su Marte" from Fascisti su Marte – Corrado Guzzanti; "Eppur sentire (un senso di te)" from Manual of Love 2 – Paolo Buonvino, Elisa Toffoli; "Passione" from Saturn in Opposition – Neffa; "One Hundred Nails" from One Hundred Nails – Paolo Fresu	Best Editing: Mirco Garrone – My Brother Is an Only Child; Francesca Calvelli – The Wedding Director; Maryline Monthieux – Golden Door; Massimo Quaglia – The Unknown Woman; Patrizio Marone – Saturn in Opposition
Best Sound: Bruno Pupparo – My Brother Is an Only Child; Mario Iaquone – Along the Ridge; Pierre Yves Labouè – Golden Door; Gilberto Martinelli – The Unknown Woman; Marco Grillo – Saturn in Opposition	Best Costumes: Mariano Tufano – Golden Door; Maurizio Millenotti – Napoleon and Me; Nicoletta Ercole – The Unknown Woman; Mariarita Barbera – My Brother Is an Only Child; Lina Nerli Taviani – The Lark Farm
Best Special Visual Effects: L'ètude et la supervision des trucages – Golden Door; Stefano Coccia, Massimo Contini, Frame by frame, Rebel think, Sirenae Film Post, Spark digital entertainment, Martina Venettoni, VISION – Fascisti su Marte; Proxima – Napoleon and Me; LUMIQ STUDIOS – The Stone Merchant; FX Italia Digital Group – The Lark Farm	Best Documentary Feature: Il mio paese – directed by Daniele Vicari; 100 anni della nostra storia – directed by Gianfranco Pannone and Marco Simon Puccioni; Bellissime (seconda parte) – directed by Giovanna Gagliardo; Souvenir Srebrenica – directed by Luca Rosini; L'udienza è aperta – directed by Vincenzo Marra
Best Short Film: Meridionali senza filtro – directed by Michele Bia; Armando – directed by Massimiliano Camaiti; La cena di Emmaus – directed by Josè Corvaglia; Solo cinque minuti – directed by Filippo Soldi; Travaglio – directed by Lele Biscussi	Best European Film: The Lives of Others – directed by Florian Henckel von Donnersmarck; Notes on a Scandal – directed by Richard Eyre; My Best Friend – directed by Patrice Leconte; The Queen – directed by Stephen Frears; Volver – directed by Pedro Almodóvar
Best Foreign Film: Babel – directed by Alejandro González Iñárritu; Letters from Iwo Jima – directed by Clint Eastwood; Little Miss Sunshine – directed by Jonathan Dayton and Valerie Faris; The Pursuit of Happyness – directed by Gabriele Muccino; The Departed – directed by Martin Scorsese	David Youth Award: Red Like the Sky – directed by Cristiano Bortone; Golden Door – directed by Emanuele Crialese; Saturn in Opposition – directed by Ferzan Özpetek; Notte prima degli esami – Oggi – directed by Fausto Brizzi
Special David Awards: Armando Trovajoli; Giuliano Montaldo; Carlo Lizzani
