= List of Italian films of 2006 =

A list of films produced in Italy in 2006 (see 2006 in film):

Title	Director	Cast	Genre	Notes
2006
Along the Ridge	Kim Rossi Stuart	Kim Rossi Stuart, Barbora Bobuľová, Alessandro Morace	Drama	
The Bodyguard's Cure	Carlo Arturo Sigon	Claudio Bisio, Stefania Rocca, Ernest Borgnine	Neo-noir	
The Caiman (Il caimano)	Nanni Moretti	Silvio Orlando, Margherita Buy, Jasmine Trinca, Michele Placido, Giuliano Montaldo, Nanni Moretti		6 David di Donatello, entered at Cannes
Commediasexi	Alessandro D'Alatri	Paolo Bonolis, Sergio Rubini, Margherita Buy, Rocco Papaleo, Michele Placido	Comedy	
Don't Make Any Plans for Tonight	Gianluca Maria Tavarelli	Luca Zingaretti, Giorgio Tirabassi, Alessandro Gassmann, Micaela Ramazzotti	Drama	
The Family Friend (L'amico di famiglia)	Paolo Sorrentino	Giacomo Rizzo, Fabrizio Bentivoglio, Laura Chiatti	Drama	
The Goodbye Kiss	Michele Soavi	Alessio Boni, Michele Placido, Isabella Ferrari	Neo-noir	
Hans	Louis Nero	Franco Nero	drama	
Ice on Fire	Umberto Marino	Raoul Bova, Donatella Finocchiaro	drama	Entered into the 28th Moscow International Film Festival
Marcello: A Sweet Life	Annarosa Morri, Mario Canale	Marcello Mastroianni	Documentary	
The Missing Star	Gianni Amelio	Sergio Castellitto	Drama	
Monamour	Tinto Brass	Anna Jimskaia	Erotic	
Night Before The Exams (Notte prima degli esami)	Fausto Brizzi	Giorgio Faletti, Cristiana Capotondi, Nicolas Vaporidis, Sarah Maestri, Chiara Mastalli, Elena Bouryka, Valeria Fabrizi	Teen Comedy	Great success. Remade in France as Nos 18 ans (2008).
The Golden Door (Nuovomondo)	Emanuele Crialese	Charlotte Gainsbourg, Vincenzo Amato	Emigrant Drama	Venice awards
One Out of Two	Eugenio Cappuccio	Fabio Volo, Anita Caprioli	Drama	
L'Orchestra di Piazza Vittorio	Agostino Ferrente		Documentary	About immigrant musicians in Rome
Really SSSupercool: Chapter Two	Carlo Vanzina	Diego Abatantuono, Sabrina Ferilli	Comedy	
The Roses of the Desert	Mario Monicelli	Michele Placido, Giorgio Pasotti, Alessandro Haber	War-drama	last film of Monicelli
Salty Air	Alessandro Angelini	Giorgio Pasotti, Giorgio Colangeli	Prison drama	
Secret Journey (Viaggio segreto)	Roberto Andò	Alessio Boni, Donatella Finocchiaro, Valeria Solarino, Claudia Gerini, Emir Kusturica	romance-drama	
La terra	Sergio Rubini	Fabrizio Bentivoglio, Paolo Briguglia, Massimo Venturiello, Emilio Solfrizzi, Sergio Rubini, Claudia Gerini	Drama	
The Unknown Woman	Giuseppe Tornatore	Kseniya Rappoport, Michele Placido, Claudia Gerini, Margherita Buy, Pierfrancesco Favino, Piera Degli Esposti, Alessandro Haber, Ángela Molina	Thriller	5 David di Donatello. 2 Awards at the Moscow Film Festival
The Wedding Director	Marco Bellocchio	Sergio Castellitto	Drama	Screened at the 2006 Cannes Film Festival
