= List of Italian films of 1998 =

A list of films produced in Italy in 1998 (see 1998 in film):

Title	Director	Cast	Genre	Notes
1998
Aprile	Nanni Moretti	Nanni Moretti, Silvio Orlando, Silvia Nono, Moretti's sons	Comedy	David di Donatello for Best Supporting Actor (Orlando), screened at Cannes
The Ballad of the Windshield Washers	Peter Del Monte	Olek Mincer, Kim Rossi Stuart, Agata Buzek	Drama	
Besieged	Bernardo Bertolucci	Thandiwe Newton, David Thewlis	Drama	
The Best Man (Il testimone dello sposo)	Pupi Avati	Diego Abatantuono, Inés Sastre	comedy	Golden Globe nominee, entered into the 48th Berlin International Film Festival
La cena	Ettore Scola	Antonio Catania, Fanny Ardant, Riccardo Garrone, Vittorio Gassman, Giancarlo Giannini, Adalberto Maria Merli, Eros Pagni	commedia all'italiana	
Children of Hannibal	Davide Ferrario	Diego Abatantuono, Silvio Orlando, Valentina Cervi	comedy	
The Dust of Naples	Antonio Capuano	Silvio Orlando, Lola Pagnani, Teresa Saponangelo	comedy	
Ecco fatto	Gabriele Muccino	Giorgio Pasotti, Claudio Santamaria, Barbora Bobulova	comedy	
The Garden of Eden	Alessandro D'Alatri	Kim Rossi Stuart, Saïd Taghmaoui, Massimo Ghini	drama	Entered the 59th Venice International Film Festival
Gunslinger's Revenge	Giovanni Veronesi	Leonardo Pieraccioni, Harvey Keitel, David Bowie	western-comedy	
The Legend of 1900 (La leggenda del pianista sull'oceano)	Giuseppe Tornatore	Tim Roth, Pruitt Taylor Vince, Mélanie Thierry, Bill Nunn, Clarence Williams III		Cutten outside Italy. 6 David di Donatello. 6 Nastro d'Argento. Based on Alessandro Baricco's theatre monologue. Spoken in English. Ennio Morricone won the Golden Globe for its score
Marriages	Cristina Comencini	Diego Abatantuono, Francesca Neri, Stefania Sandrelli, Claude Brasseur	romantic comedy	
Monella	Tinto Brass	Anna Ammirati, Serena Grandi	erotic comedy	
My Best Friend's Wife	Vincenzo Salemme	Vincenzo Salemme, Eva Herzigová	comedy	
Notes of Love	Mimmo Calopresti	Valeria Bruni Tedeschi, Fabrizio Bentivoglio, Mimmo Calopresti, Gérard Depardieu	drama	
Of Lost Love	Michele Placido	Giovanna Mezzogiorno, Fabrizio Bentivoglio, Rocco Papaleo	drama	Screened at the 59th Venice Film Festival
The Phantom of the Opera	Dario Argento	Julian Sands, Asia Argento	horror	
I piccoli maestri	Daniele Luchetti	Stefano Accorsi, Giorgio Pasotti, Marco Paolini	drama	Entered the 59th Venice International Film Festival
Radiofreccia	Luciano Ligabue	Stefano Accorsi, Francesco Guccini, Serena Grandi	drama	
Rehearsals for War	Mario Martone	Andrea Renzi, Iaia Forte, Toni Servillo	drama	Screened at the 1998 Cannes Film Festival
The Room of the Scirocco	Maurizio Sciarra	Giancarlo Giannini, Tiziana Lodato	romance	
The Scent of the Night (L'odore della notte)	Pupi Avati	Valerio Mastandrea, Marco Giallini, Giorgio Tirabassi, Little Tony	crime-drama	Screened at the 59th Venice International Film Festival
Shooting the Moon	Francesca Archibugi	Valeria Golino, Sergio Rubini, Stefano Dionisi	drama	Entered the 59th Venice International Film Festival
Mr. Fifteen Balls (Il signor Quindicipalle)	Francesco Nuti	Francesco Nuti, Sabrina Ferilli	comedy	
L'ultimo Capodanno	Marco Risi	Monica Bellucci, Marco Giallini, Claudio Santamaria	comedy drama	
Viola bacia tutti	Giovanni Veronesi	Asia Argento, Rocco Papaleo, Valerio Mastandrea	comedy	
The Way We Laughed (Così ridevano)	Gianni Amelio	Enrico Lo Verso, Francesco Giuffrida	Drama	Golden Lion winner
We'll Really Hurt You	Pino Quartullo	Pino Quartullo, Ricky Memphis, Stefania Sandrelli, Anna Valle	comedy	
You Laugh (Tu ridi)	Paolo and Vittorio Taviani	Antonio Albanese, Sabrina Ferilli, Turi Ferro, Lello Arena	Drama	Best Director Award at Mar del Plata Film Festival
Viol@	Donatella Maiorca	Stefania Rocca, Ennio Fantastichini	Erotic drama	
