= 50th David di Donatello =

2005 Italian film awards

- Date: 29 April 2005
- Site: Auditorium Parco della Musica, Rome
- Hosted by: Mike Bongiorno and Luisa Corna

Highlights
- Best Picture: The Consequences of Love
- Most awards: The Consequences of Love (5)
- Most nominations: Sacred Heart and Manual of Love (12)

Television coverage
- Network: Rai 1

The 50th David di Donatello ceremony, presented by the Accademia del Cinema Italiano, was held on 29 April 2005.

== Winners and nominees ==
Best Film: The Consequences of Love, directed by Paolo Sorrentino; A Children's Story, directed by Andrea and Antonio Frazzi; The Keys to the House, directed by Gianni Amelio; Sacred Heart, directed by Ferzan Özpetek; Manual of Love, directed by Giovanni Veronesi	Best Producer: Rosario Rinaldo – A Children's Story; Aurelio De Laurentiis – Manual of Love; Davide Ferrario – After Midnight; Elda Ferri – Come into the Light; Domenico Procacci, Nicola Giuliano – The Consequences of Love
Best Director: Paolo Sorrentino – The Consequences of Love; Gianni Amelio – The Keys to the House; Davide Ferrario – After Midnight; Andrea and Antonio Frazzi – A Children's Story; Ferzan Özpetek – Sacred Heart	Best New Director: Saverio Costanzo – Private; Paolo Franchi – The Spectator; David Grieco – Evilenko; Stefano Mordini – Smalltown, Italy; Paolo Vari and Antonio Bocola – Chemical Hunger
Best Actor: Toni Servillo – The Consequences of Love; Stefano Accorsi – Smalltown, Italy; Giorgio Pasotti – After Midnight; Kim Rossi Stuart – The Keys to the House; Luca Zingaretti – Come into the Light	Best Actress: 'Barbora Bobuľová – Sacred Heart; Sandra Ceccarelli – The Life That I Want; Valentina Cervi – Smalltown, Italy; Maria de Medeiros – The Remains of Nothing; Maya Sansa – An Italian Romance
Best Supporting Actor: Carlo Verdone – Manual of Love; Johnny Dorelli – But When Do the Girls Get Here?; Silvio Muccino – Manual of Love; Raffaele Pisu – The Consequences of Love; Fabio Troiano – After Midnight	Best Supporting Actress: Margherita Buy – Manual of Love; Erika Blanc – 'Sacred Heart; Lisa Gastoni – Sacred Heart; Giovanna Mezzogiorno – Love Returns; Galatea Ranzi – The Life That I Want
David di Donatello for Best Screenplay: Paolo Sorrentino – The Consequences of Love; Gianni Amelio, Sandro Petraglia, Stefano Rulli – The Keys to the House; Gianni Romoli, Ferzan Özpetek – Sacred Heart; Davide Ferrario – After Midnight; Ugo Chiti, Giovanni Veronesi – Manual of Love	Best Cinematography: Luca Bigazzi – The Consequences of Love; Tani Canevari – Manual of Love; Arnaldo Catinari – The Life That I Want; Dante Cecchin – After Midnight; Gianfilippo Corticelli – Sacred Heart
Best Production Design: Andrea Crisanti – Sacred Heart; Giancarlo Basili – An Italian Romance; Francesca Bocca – After Midnight; Marco Dentici – The Life That I Want; Beatrice Scarpato –The Remains of Nothing	Best Score: Riz Ortolani – But When Do the Girls Get Here?; Paolo Buonvino – Manual of Love; Pasquale Catalano – The Consequences of Love; Andrea Guerra – Sacred Heart; Franco Piersanti – The Keys to the House
Best Song: "Christmas in Love" from Christmas in Love – Tony Renis, Marva Jan Marrow; "Fame chimica" from Chemical Hunger – 'O Zulù; "Gioia e rivoluzione" from Working Slowly (Radio Alice) – Patrizio Fariselli, Ares Tavolazzi, Paolo Tofani, Afterhours; "Manuale d'amore" from Manual of Love – Paolo Buonvino; "Ma quando arrivano le ragazze?" from But When Do the Girls Get Here? – Riz Ortolani	Best Editing: Claudio Cutry – A Children's Story; Claudio Cormio – After Midnight; Claudio Di Mauro – Manual of Love; Giogiò Franchini – The Consequences of Love; Patrizio Marone – Sacred Heart; Simona Paggi – The Keys to the House
Best Sound: Alessandro Zanon – The Keys to the House; Mario Dallimonti – Come into the Light; Gaetano Carito, Pierpaolo Merafino – Manual of Love; Marco Grillo – Sacred Heart; Daghi Rondanini, Emanuele Cecere – The Consequences of Love	Best Costumes: Daniela Ciancio –The Remains of Nothing; Maria Rita Barbera – The Life That I Want; Catia Dottori – Sacred Heart; Gianna Gissi – An Italian Romance; Gemma Mascagni – Manual of Love
Best Special Visual Effects: Grande Mela – After Midnight; Paola Trisoglio, Stefano Marinoni – Come into the Light; Proxima – Love Returns; Pasquale Croce and Roberto Mestroni for E.D.I. – Eyes of Crystal; Apocalypse – The Three Faces of Terror	Best Documentary Feature: Un silenzio particolare, directed by Stefano Rulli; I dischi del sole, directed by Luca Pastore; Travelling with Che Guevara, directed by Gianni Minà; Passaggi di tempo – Il viaggio di Sonos 'e Memoria, directed by Gianfranco Cabiddu; I ragazzi della Panaria, directed by Nello Correale
Best Short Film: Aria, directed by Claudio Noce (ex aequo); Lotta libera, directed by Stefano Viali (ex aequo); Mio fratello Yang, directed by Massimiliano & Gianluca De Serio; O' guarracino, directed by Michelangelo Fornaro; Un refolo, directed by Giovanni Arcangeli	Best European Film: The Sea Inside, directed by Alejandro Amenábar; The Chorus, directed by Christophe Barratier; The Merchant of Venice, directed by Michael Radford; Vera Drake, directed by Mike Leigh; Head-On, directed by Fatih Akın
Best Foreign Film: Million Dollar Baby, directed by Clint Eastwood; 2046, directed by Wong Kar-wai; 3-Iron, directed by Kim Ki-duk; Hotel Rwanda, directed by Terry George; Ray, directed by Taylor Hackford	David Youth Award: Come into the Light, directed by Roberto Faenza
Torino Piemonte Film Commission Award: A Children's Story, directed by Andrea and Antonio Frazzi	Special David Awards: Carlo Azeglio Ciampi; Tom Cruise; Mario Monicelli; Dino Risi; Cecchi Gori Group
