= Giovanni Basso =

Italian film director (born 1984)

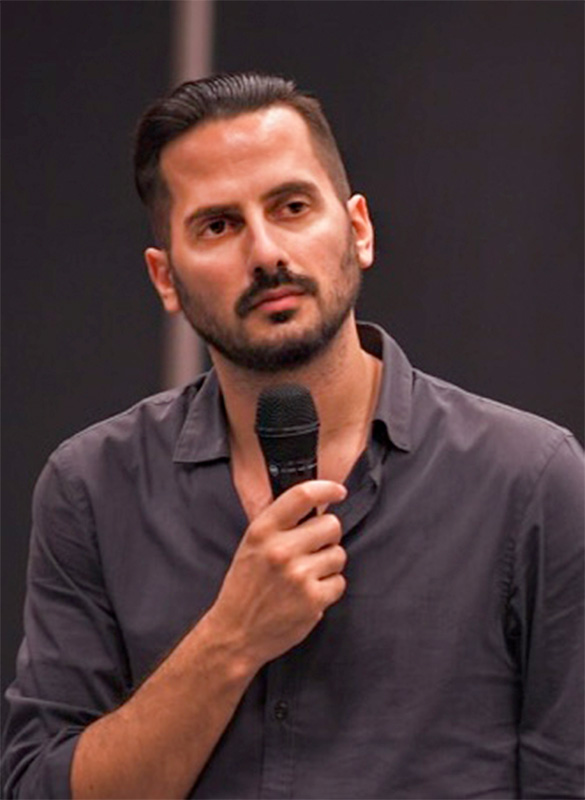
- Giovanni Basso in 2022
- Born: 27 February 1984 (age 41); Ferrara, Italy
- Occupations: Film director; screenwriter; Film producer

Giovanni Basso (27 February 1984) is an Italo-Australian film director, screenwriter and producer. He is best known for directing the 2022 film Mindemic.

== Biography ==
Basso was born in Ferrara, Northern Italy, and graduated from the Liceo Classico Ludovico Ariosto in 2003. He moved to Australia in 2010, later becoming a naturalized Australian.

== Career ==
In 2013, he wrote, directed, and produced the Australian short film The Swimmer, which competed in over fifty film festivals and at the 2013 Hollywood Film Awards. In 2014, he wrote, directed, and produced Terra Continens, a short film presented in 2015 as a special event during the Venice Film Festival. In 2018, he wrote and directed Il Grande Presidente, a short film starring Lorenzo Balducci and Giorgio Colangeli, shot on 35mm film, with support from the MiC - Ministry of Culture, the Centro Sperimentale di Cinematografia, and SIAE.

In 2022, he wrote and directed his debut feature film, Mindemic, starring Giorgio Colangeli. The film, shot entirely with an iPhone, received several nominations at the 2023 Ciak d'oro awards. On the 19th of September 2022, it was included in the list of twelve Italian films to possibly represent Italy as a foreign language film at the 2023 Academy Awards.

== Filmography ==
=== Short film ===
Year	Title	Director	Writer	Producer	Notes
2007	L'Odore della Notte	Yes	Yes	Yes	Also cinematographer
2013	The Swimmer	Yes	Yes	Yes	
2015	Terra Continens	Yes	Yes	Yes	Also editor
2019	Il Grande Presidente	Yes	Yes	Yes	Also editor

=== Feature film ===
Year	Title	Director	Writer	Producer	Notes
2022	Mindemic	Yes	Yes	Yes	Also cinematographer and editor

== Awards and nominations ==
Year	Title	Award/Nomination
2023	Mindemic	Nominated - Golden Ciak for Best Emerging Director; Los Angeles Italia Film Festival Award for Best Feature
