= Morace =

Morace is an Italian surname. Notable people with the surname include:

- Alessandro Morace, Italian child actor
- Carolina Morace (born 1964), former Italian football player
- Robert Morace (born 1947), American writer

== See also ==
- Moraceae, family of flowering plants
