= Mindemic =

2022 film

- Theatrical release poster
- Directed by: Giovanni Basso
- Screenplay by: Giovanni Basso
- Produced by: Giovanni Basso
- Starring: Giorgio Colangeli; Rosanna Gentili; Paolo Gasparini; Roberto Andreucci; Claudio Alfredo Alfonsi
- Cinematography: Giovanni Basso
- Edited by: Giovanni Basso
- Music by: Teo Usuelli
- Production company: Magnet Films
- Distributed by: Azimut Distribution
- Release date: 15 June 2022
- Running time: 84 minutes
- Country: Italy
- Language: Italian

Mindemic is a 2022 Italian psychological comedy drama film directed by Giovanni Basso in his directorial debut. It was in competition at the 2023 David di Donatello Awards.

The film was nominated for three Golden Ciak, including Best Emerging Director, Best Lead Actor and Best Playbill.

== Plot ==
Nino, a retired seventy-year-old director, is tasked by his longtime producer, Fredo, to craft a new screenplay. Accepting the challenge, he types away on his cherished typewriter, inspired to create an epic war tale. Seeking aid, he reaches out to past collaborators: screenwriter De Paoli, who declines, and actor Giovanni Marino, who rejects the offered role.

Lost in his creative fervor, Nino stages his script in his apartment, playing every part himself—a band of soldiers rescuing a mysterious woman in a vague war. Nino also receives a visit from a woman, a prostitute identical to his ex-wife Angela, who left him years before and with whom he's still in love. As he writes, Nino slips into a delirium where memories of Angela and his colleagues blur with his film’s plot, muddling reality and illusion. When Angela tells him he’s dead and his world unreal, Nino persists, finishing his script with a warped conclusion.

On his apartment’s terrace—never once departed—he stands with her, accepting his fate hand in hand.

== Cast ==
- Giorgio Colangeli as Nino
- Rosanna Gentili as Angela
- Roberto Andreucci as De Paoli
- Paolo Gasparini as Giovanni Marino
- Claudio Alfredo Alfonsi as Fredo
- Rossella Gardini as Lucia

== Production ==
During an interview for The Hot Corn, Basso stated:

"When I penned the script two years ago, I crafted it with Giorgio Colangeli in mind for the lead, having first met him in 2018 while collaborating on my short film Il Grande Presidente. I printed his photograph and kept it as a guiding touchstone throughout the writing process. After sending him the completed script, I fretted he might decline due to its unconventional narrative twists. Yet, just three days later, Giorgio rang me, brimming with enthusiasm, declaring his unwavering commitment to take on the role regardless of any challenges."

The movie was filmed in Rome inside an apartment in via Galeazzo Alessi (Tor Pignattara). It was entirely shot on an iPhone 8+ with an anamorphic lens. Basso also stated that all the phone & video calls that Nino makes in the film were recorded live and not added in post-production.

== Promotion and Distribution ==
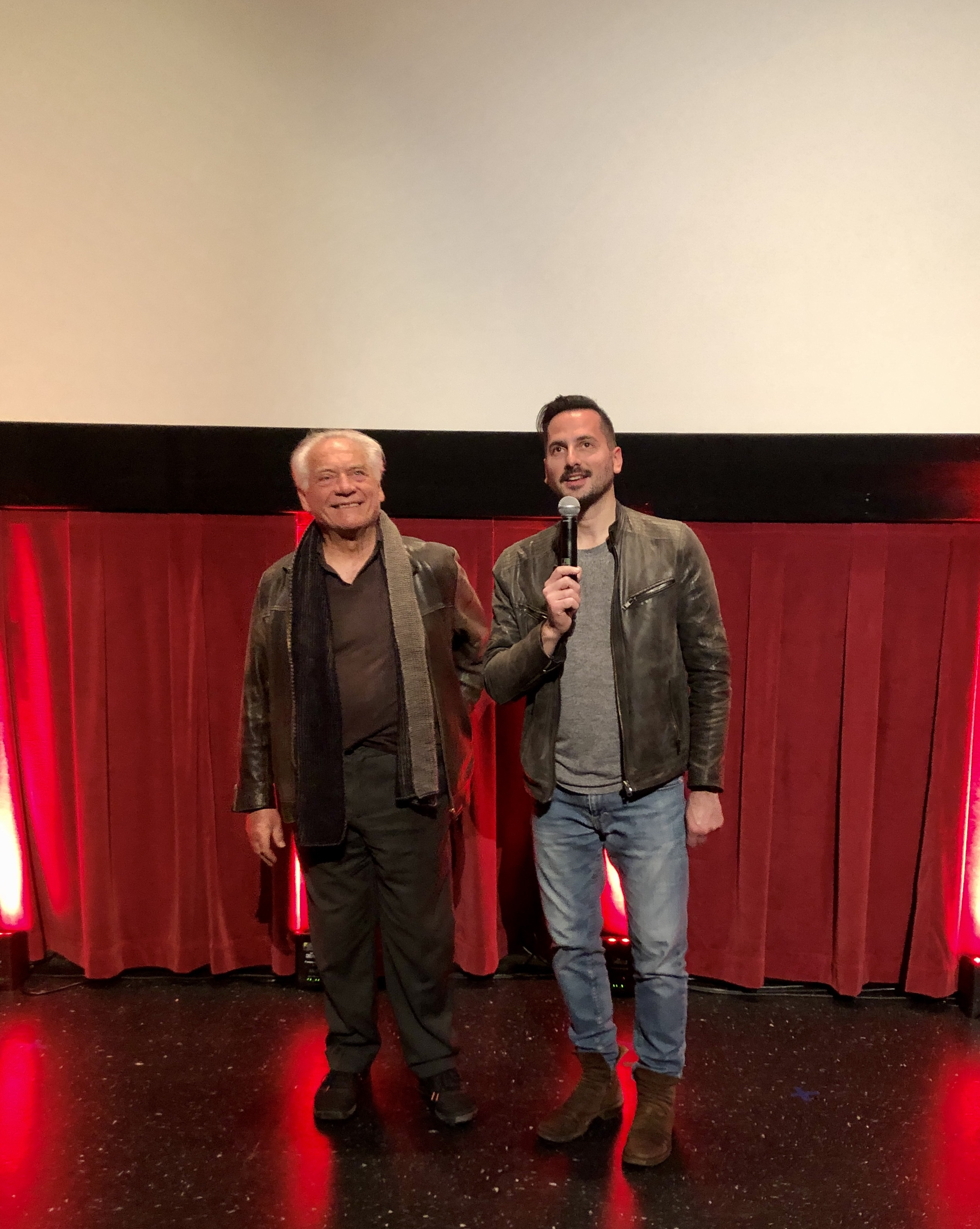
Colangeli and Basso at an event in Los Angeles in 2023

The official trailer was published on the Coming Soon YouTube channel on June 9, 2022, while a promotional clip of the film was published on MYmovies on June 14, 2022.

The movie was distributed in Italian cinemas on June 15, 2022. On the 19th of September 2022 it was included in the list of twelve Italian films to possibly represent Italy at the 2023 Academy Awards. Since the 3rd of August 2023 the movie is available on demand on the streaming platform Chili. In June 2024, the film received a limited theatrical release across select Australian cinemas.

== Soundtrack ==
As indicated in the film's credits, the soundtrack is composed entirely by the music that the Italian composer Teo Usuelli created for the 1968 film La Rivoluzione Sessuale by Riccardo Ghione, published by Universal Music Group.

== Reception ==
The movie was positively reviewed by the critics:

When the threads of the mind unravel, when memory and action blur and intertwine, all that remains is what existed at the start: a newborn cradled in a blue sky on the terrace of a new era—or so it appears. Now, all that remains for Nino, amid this bewildering darkness, is a gentle sway. Once again, we are primitives of a new age, where the contagion fades yet the enduring spread of his idea persists, cast forth on a fresh journey into a world of shifting rules and growing uncertainty. What were we like when we were human?

— Leonardo Lardieri, Sentieri Selvaggi, 15 June 2022

Giovanni Basso stakes all on the towering talent of Giorgio Colangeli, clinching a triumph. Colangeli anchors the film, his commanding presence a force unbound, seldom yielding the frame to fellow players. It is he who weaves the narrative’s strands, a Demiurge in flesh, lending lightness to a work that otherwise embraces claustrophobia—both mind and matter—as its haunting hallmark

— Lucia Mancini, Cinematographe.it, 16 June 2022

Giovanni Basso helms a daring, expansive debut film (echoing Kubrick’s 1953 Fear and Desire), raw and redemptive, a prismatic lens that bends light and mirrors truth, ever-shifting.

— Silvia Lumaca, Framed, 17 June 2022

Crafted as a metaphor for the artist’s creative existence, Mindemic emerged during the 2020 lockdown, absorbing its essence of confinement and bewilderment, evolving into a universal tale of uncertainty and the rejection of conventional frameworks. This break from tradition is further underscored by the director’s decision to film entirely with an iPhone, harnessing the medium’s technical-artistic potential, including its liberating flexibility and shooting agility [...]

— Miriam Raccosta, Rivista del cinematografo, 15 June 2022

Mindemic is a fearless work that boldly cites, toys with déjà vu, and plunges into the vast cinematic crucible of the past eighty years, summoning Kubrick (Nino’s compulsive script-scrawling) or, as Colangeli mutters before his so-called Olivetti, “Ben Hur, Fellini, 2001: A Space Odyssey, Antonioni, Cassavetes,” unfurling a nostalgic frenzy that teeters on the edge of perilous intoxication.

— Francesca Pistocchi, Close-Up, 15 June 2022

== Awards and nominations ==
Year	Award/Nomination
2022	Nominated - Golden Ciak for Best Emerging Director; Nominated - Golden Ciak for Best Actor; Nominated - Golden Ciak for Best Playbill
2023	Los Angeles Italia Film Festival Award for Best Feature
