= Linda Ferri =

Italian author and screenwriter

- Born: 1957 (age 68–69); Rome, Italy
- Education: Columbia University
- Occupations: Author; screenwriter

Linda Ferri (born 1957 in Rome) is an Italian author and screenwriter.

== Early life ==
Linda Ferri was born in Rome to an American mother and Italian father. However, she spent most of her early years in Paris, France. Ferri graduated with a degree in political science in Paris. Subsequently, she studied Philosophy at Columbia University in New York. She later graduated with a degree in philosophy of history in Florence, Italy. Ferri worked numerous years in the writing industry, publishing work as a translator and editor of foreign literature.

In an interview with Biblioteche di Roma in 2012, Ferri states that even though she has had a permanent and lifelong love for literature, it was truly cinema that provided her with the most vivid and lasting memories of her childhood. She suggested that she could remember films better than books because she associated them with exciting family memories. In 2009, during an interview for the Italian edition of Marie Claire magazine, conducted by Lorenzo Pesce. Ferri states: "Perhaps being a woman helps me delve into the motions, or perhaps not. I do not believe in a 'feminine writing', a film script involves a multiplicity of gazes, it does not have a gender."

== Career ==
=== Cinema ===
Ferri is an author who is perhaps best known for her work as a screenwriter. Following her first publication, she co-wrote the screenplay Voglia una donnaaa! in 1998, which was directed and co-written by two brothers, Marco and Luca Mazzieri. Subsequently, Ferri co-wrote the story and screenplay for La stanza del figlio (The Son’s Room) directed by Nanni Moretti in 2001. Additionally, in 2001, she co-wrote Luce dei mei Occhi (Light of my eyes) and La Vita che Vorrei (The Life I Want) directed by Giuseppe Piccioni in 2004. Ferri co-wrote Anche Libero Va Bene (Along the Ridge) in 2006, directed by Kim Rossi Stuart.

=== Novels ===
Her first novel, entitled Incantesimi (Enchantments) is a fable-like biography with autobiographical roots (Translated in French as Enchantements by Marilène Raiola and Joël Gayraud, Paris, Mille et une nuits, 2000). The book resembles a memoir from the age of a toddler to early teen years. Ferri’s second book, Il Tempo Che Resta (The Time That Remains), is an assortment of seven short stories on the theme of love. Additionally, Ferri’s second novel, Cecilia, is a feminist reinterpretation of the myth of Saint Cecilia. It was born from what Ferri describes as “falling in love” stemming from emotions aroused by the baroque artist Stefano Maderno’s statue of Saint Cecilia in the Church of Saint-Cecilia in Rome. She has also written and illustrated a number of children’s picture books.

== Filmography ==
- 1998: Voglio una donnaaa! directed by Luca Mazzieri, Marco Mazzieri
- 2001: La stanza del figlio (The Son’s Room) directed by Nanni Moretti
- 2001: Luce dei mei occhi (Light of my Eyes) directed by Giuseppe Piccioni
- 2004: La vita che Vorrei (The Life I Want) directed by Giuseppe Piccioni
- 2006: Anche libero va bene (Along the Ridge) directed by Kim Rossi Stuart
- 2009: Di me cosa ne sai directed by Valerio Jalongo
- 2010: Come un soffio directed by Michela Cescon
- 2012: My bow breathing directed by Enrico Maria Artale

== Awards ==
| Year | Award | Film | Category | Nomination/Win |
|---|---|---|---|---|
| 2001 | Cannes International Film Festival | La stanza del figlio (The Son's Room) | Palme d'Or | Win |
| 2001 | David di Donatello | La stanza del figlio (The Son's Room) | Best Screenplay | Nominated |
| 2001 | Nastro D'Argento | La stanza del figlio (The Son's Room) | Best Screenplay | Nominated |
| 2007 | David Di Donatello | Anche libero va bene (Along the Ridge) | Best Screenplay | Nominated |
