= A Small Southern Enterprise =

- Theatrical release poster
- Italian: Una piccola impresa meridionale
- Directed by: Rocco Papaleo
- Written by: Rocco Papaleo; Valter Lupo
- Produced by: Arturo Paglia; Isabella Cocuzza
- Starring: Riccardo Scamarcio; Barbora Bobuľová; Rocco Papaleo; Sarah Felberbaum; Claudia Potenza; Giovanni Esposito; Giampiero Schiano; Giuliana Lojodice
- Cinematography: Fabio Zamarion
- Edited by: Christian Lombardi
- Music by: Rita Marcotulli
- Distributed by: Warner Bros. Pictures
- Release date: October 17, 2013
- Running time: 101 minutes
- Country: Italy
- Language: Italian

A Small Southern Enterprise (Italian: Una piccola impresa meridionale) is a 2013 Italian comedy film directed by Rocco Papaleo.

It is based on Papaleo's novel of the same name.

== Plot ==
Don Costantino leaves the priesthood after falling in love with a woman who does not return his feelings. Consequently, his mother forces him to take refuge in a family-owned lighthouse, where she hopes to hide his broken vows from a judgmental village. However, isolation proves impossible. As several people trickle into the building—including his humiliated brother-in-law, a former prostitute, a lesbian couple, and an eccentric renovation crew hiding their own domestic crises—the lighthouse transforms into a sanctuary for social outcasts. United by scandal and marginalization, this dysfunctional assembly bands together to turn the crumbling fortress into a cozy hotel, providing them with an opportunity to rebuild their futures and seek personal redemption, while finally leaving society's prejudices behind.

== Cast ==
- Rocco Papaleo as Don Costantino
- Riccardo Scamarcio as Arturo
- Barbora Bobulova as Magnolia
- Sarah Felberbaum as Valbona
- Claudia Potenza as Rosa Maria
- Giuliana Lojodice as Stella
- Giovanni Esposito as Raffaele
- Susy Del Giudice as Maddalena
- Giorgio Colangeli as Emanuele
- Giampiero Schiano as Gennaro/Jennifer

== Accolades ==
Award	Category	Recipient	Result	Year	Ref
David di Donatello	Best Original Song	"Dove cadono i fulmini" by Erica Mou	Nominated	2014	
Nastro d'Argento	Best Supporting Actress	Giuliana Lojodice, Claudia Potenza	Nominated	2014	
Ciak d'oro	Best Supporting Actress	Giuliana Lojodice	Nominated	2014	
