= Kaputt Mundi =

- Directed by: Marco Risi
- Written by: Marco Risi; Niccolò Ammaniti
- Starring: Monica Bellucci; Alessandro Haber; Giorgio Tirabassi; Ricky Memphis; Beppe Fiorello; Angela Finocchiaro
- Cinematography: Maurizio Calvesi
- Edited by: Franco Fraticelli
- Music by: Andrea Rocca
- Release date: 1998
- Country: Italy
- Language: Italian

Kaputt Mundi (Italian: L'ultimo capodanno) is a 1998 Italian comedy drama film directed by Marco Risi. It is based on the short story L'ultimo capodanno dell'umanità by Niccolò Ammaniti.

== Cast ==
- Monica Bellucci: Giulia Giovannini
- Marco Giallini: Enzo Di Girolamo
- Angela Finocchiaro: signora Rinaldi
- Claudio Santamaria: Cristiano Carucci
- Iva Zanicchi: Gina Carucci
- Giorgio Tirabassi: Augusto Carbone
- Ricky Memphis: Orecchino
- Adriano Pappalardo: Mastino di Dio
- Piero Natoli: Vittorio Trodini
- Francesca D'Aloja: Lisa Faraone
- Alessandro Haber: avv. Rinaldi
- Giuseppe Fiorello: Gaetano Malacozza
- Ludovica Modugno: Filomena
- Antonella Steni: Esa Giovannini
- Maria Monti: Scintilla

== See also ==
- List of Italian films of 1998
