= Caterina e le sue figlie =

Italian television series

- Genre: Comedy-drama
- Starring: Virna Lisi; Alessandra Martines; Valeria Milillo; Sarah Felberbaum; Giuliana De Sio; Ray Lovelock; Alessandro Benvenuti; Iva Zanicchi; it:Giacomo Piperno
- Country of origin: Italy
- No. of seasons: 3
- No. of episodes: 18

Production
- Running time: 90 mins.

Original release
- Network: Canale 5
- Release: December 4, 2005 – March 3, 2010

Caterina e le sue figlie (Caterina and her daughters) (known internationally as My Daughters) is an Italian television series that aired from December 4, 2005 to March 3, 2010 on Canale 5. The comedy series follows single mother Catherine (Virna Lisi) as she tries to balance raising three daughters alone and dating.

== Cast ==
- Virna Lisi: Caterina Foresi in Parisi - Pensiero
- Alessandra Martines: Adele Parisi
- Valeria Milillo: Agostina Parisi
- Sarah Felberbaum: Carlotta Parisi
- Nancy Brilli: Renata Pensiero
- Manuela Arcuri: Morena
- Carol Alt: Ines
- Iva Zanicchi: Liliana
- Alessandro Benvenuti: Ettore
- Ray Lovelock: Attilio Pensiero
- Giuliana De Sio: Cetty Saponero
- Eva Grimaldi: Eleonora
- Rossy de Palma: Estrella Toledo
- Ángela Molina: Maria

== See also ==
- List of Italian television series
