= Ecco fatto =

1998 film

- Directed by: Gabriele Muccino
- Screenplay by: Andrea Garello; Nicola Alvau; Gabriele Muccino
- Story by: Gabriele Muccino
- Produced by: Domenico Procacci; Anouk Andarolo; Francesco Nardello
- Starring: Enrico Silvestrin; Barbora Bobuľová; Giorgio Pasotti; Ginevra Colonna; Claudio Santamaria
- Cinematography: Arnaldo Catinari
- Edited by: Claudio Di Mauro
- Music by: Paolo Buonvino
- Production company: Fandango
- Distributed by: Mikado Film
- Release date: 27 November 1998
- Running time: 90 minutes
- Country: Italy
- Language: Italian

Ecco fatto is a 1998 Italian romantic comedy-drama film directed by Gabriele Muccino.

== Plot ==
Matteo is a twenty-year-old who is impulsive and hardly committed to his studies. He and Margherita fall in love. She is a young, strong Slavic woman who is older than him and who has already taken her place in the world of work. However, Matteo's insecurity ruins this potentially very beautiful love story. His jealousy transforms itself into a morbid obsession. Things are getting worse and worse at school too. Is everything sliding down towards a tragic epilogue?

== Cast ==
- Giorgio Pasotti: Matteo
- Claudio Santamaria: Piterone
- Barbora Bobuľová: Margherita
- Enrico Silvestrin: Paolo
- Ginevra Colonna: Floriana
- Stefano Abbati: preside
- Gigio Alberti: Gigio
- Sergio Rubini: parcheggiatore abusivo

== See also ==
- List of Italian films of 1998
