= Sarah Felberbaum =

Italian actress

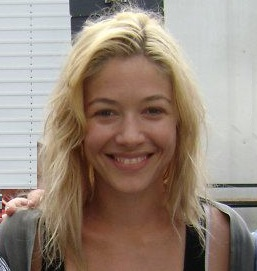
- Born: 28 November 1980 (age 45); London, England
- Citizenship: United Kingdom; Italy
- Occupations: Actress; model
- Spouse: Daniele De Rossi (m. 2015)
- Children: 2

Sarah Frances Rose Felberbaum (born 28 November 1980) is a British-born Italian actress and model. She was nominated for a David di Donatello for Best Actress for her performance in The Jewel (2011).

== Life and career ==
Born in London to a British mother and an American father of German-Jewish descent, Felberbaum moved to Italy with her family when she was a year old. At 15 she started working as a model and appearing in commercials and music videos. In 2000 she hosted the Italian version of the music show Top of the Pops and in 2002 she hosted the Rai 1 talk show Unomattina Estate. She made her acting debut in 2001 in the sitcom Via Zanardi, 33. Active in films, television and on stage, in 2011 she was nominated in the best actress category at the David di Donatello for her performance in The Jewel.

On 26 December 2015. she married A.S. Roma and Italy national football team midfielder Daniele De Rossi in a private ceremony in the Maldives; the couple had been in a relationship since 2011 and have a daughter, Olivia Rose, born on 14 February 2014, and a son, Noah, born on 3 September 2016.

== Filmography ==
=== Films ===
Year	Title	Role(s)	Notes
2007	Cardiofitness	Ilaria	Feature film debut
2010	Due vite per caso	Letizia	
2010	Ti presento un amico	Francesca Berardi	
2010	Men vs. Women	Francesca	
2011	Women vs. Men	Francesca	
2011	The Jewel	Laura Aliprandi	
2012	La stagione dell'amore	Sonia	Short film
2012	Viva l'Italia	Valentina	
2013	The Unlikely Prince	Princess Letizia	
2013	A Small Southern Enterprise	Valbona	
2015	Poli opposti	Claudia Torrini	
2018	Tu mi nascondi qualcosa	Valeria	
2018	Nessuno come noi	Betty Bottone	
2018	One Of The Family	Regina	
2019	Bentornato Presidente!	Janis Clementi	
2019	I'm Not a Killer	Beatrice	
2021	Like a Cat on a Highway 2	Camilla	
2022	Sposa in rosso	Roberta	

=== Television ===
Year	Title	Role(s)	Notes
2001	Via Zanardi 33	Lucia	Recurring role; 4 episodes
2005–10	Caterina e le sue figlie	Carlotta Parisi	Main role; 18 episodes
2007	La figlia di Elisa - Ritorno a Rivombrosa	Countess Agnese Ristori	Lead role; 8 episodes
2008	Caravaggio	Lena	Miniseries
2008	Giorni da leone	Asia	2 episodes
2009	Mal'aria	Elsa Corzari	Television film
2010	Caldo criminale	Cecilia	Television film
2012–14	The Young Montalbano	Livia Burlando	Recurring role (season 1), guest star (season 2); 5 episodes
2012–15	Una grande famiglia	Nicoletta Rengoni	Main role; 21 episodes
2016	Medici	Maddalena	Recurring role; 4 episodes
2016	Stasera casa Mika	Herself / co-host	Variety show (season 1)
2022	Non mi lasciare	Giada Lari	Main role; 8 episodes
2023	Tina Anselmi: Una vita per la democrazia	Tina Anselmi	Television film
2025	Real Men	Ilenia	Main role; 8 episodes

=== Music videos ===
Year	Title	Artist(s)	Notes
1999	"Come voglio"	Zero Assoluto	
2002	"Magari meno"	Zero Assoluto	
2005	"Contromano"	Nek	
2008	"Il mio pensiero"	Ligabue	
2019	"L'ultimo ostacolo"	Paola Turci	
