= The Vanity Serum =

- Film poster
- Directed by: Alex Infascelli
- Written by: Niccolò Ammaniti; Antonio Manzini
- Produced by: Marco Poccioni
- Starring: Margherita Buy; Barbora Bobuľová; Valerio Mastandrea; Francesca Neri
- Cinematography: Stefano Ricciotti
- Edited by: Esmeralda Calabria
- Music by: Morgan
- Release date: 15 April 2004
- Running time: 92 minutes
- Language: Italian

The Vanity Serum (Italian: Il siero della vanità) is a 2004 Italian mystery film directed by Alex Infascelli. It is loosely based on the novel Il libro italiano dei morti by Niccolò Ammaniti.

== Plot synopsis ==
The VIPs of Italian television mysteriously disappear. Two detectives, Lucia and Franco, try to investigate the mystery, drowning into a strange world ruled by the powerful movie star Sonia Norton.

== Cast ==
- Margherita Buy as Lucia Allasco
- Francesca Neri as Sonia Norton
- Valerio Mastandrea as Franco Berardi
- Barbora Bobuľová as Azzurra Rispoli
- Marco Giallini as Michele Benda
- Ninni Bruschetta as Vittorio Terracciano
- Luis Molteni as Rocco Piccolo
- Rosario J. Gnolo as Mago Daniel
- Armando De Razza as Michel Simone

== See also ==
- List of Italian films of 2004
