= Via Zanardi 33 =

- Genre: Sitcom
- Starring: Dino Abbrescia; Alessandra Bertin; Ginevra Colonna; Elio Germano; Antonia Liskova; Enrico Silvestrin
- Country of origin: Italy
- Original language: Italian
- No. of seasons: 1
- No. of episodes: 24

Original release
- Network: Italia 1
- Release: January 28 – May 15, 2001

Via Zanardi, 33 is an Italian television series.

== Cast ==
- Dino Abbrescia: Stefano
- Alessandra Bertin: Fra
- Ginevra Colonna: Bea
- Sarah Felberbaum: Lucia
- Elio Germano: Ivan
- Antonia Liskova: Anneke
- Enrico Silvestrin: Mattia
- Patrizio Pelizzi: Gianni

== See also ==
- List of Italian television series
