= Tulpa (film) =

2012 film by Federico Zampaglione

- Theatrical release poster
- Italian: Tulpa – Perdizioni mortali
- Directed by: Federico Zampaglione
- Screenplay by: Giacomo Gensini; Federico Zampaglione
- Story by: Dardano Sacchetti
- Produced by: Maria Grazia Cucinotta
- Starring: Claudia Gerini; Michela Cescon; Ivan Franek; Nuot Arquint; Federica Vincenti; Pierpaolo Lovino; Giulia Bertinelli; Giorgia Sinicorni; Crisula Stafida; Piero Maggiò; Michele Placido
- Cinematography: Giuseppe Maio
- Edited by: Marco Spoletini
- Music by: Francesco Zampaglione; Andrea Moscianese
- Production company: Italian Dreams Factory
- Distributed by: Bolero Film
- Release dates: 25 August 2012 (FrightFest); 20 June 2013 (Italy)
- Running time: 82 minutes
- Country: Italy
- Language: English

Tulpa (Italian: Tulpa – Perdizioni mortali) is a 2012 Italian giallo-horror film co-written and directed by Federico Zampaglione. It premiered at the 2012 London FrightFest Film Festival and was released in Italy on 20 June 2013.

== Plot ==
Lisa Boeri is a businesswoman with a secret double life. During the day she is a busy and serious worker, but at night she frequents the private club Tulpa, owned by a haunting Tibetan guru, where the sickest fantasies of customers become reality. As the fiery lovers who attended Lisa begin to die one by one in increasingly cruel ways, she realizes she's involved in the chain of murders. In order to keep her private life a secret, Lisa investigates alone - and faces a terrible escalation of death, mystery and eroticism.

== Cast ==
- Claudia Gerini as Lisa Boeri
- Michela Cescon as Giovanna
- Nuot Arquint as Kiran
- Michele Placido as Roccaforte
- Ennio Tozzi as Ferri
- Ivan Franek as Stefan
- Crisula Stafida as Giulia

== Reception ==
The film received generally positive reviews by Italian film critics. It was referred as "more than a tribute to the masters of the genre of the Seventies", "an attempt to resurrect an imaginary, a disenchanted and passionate way of making films". Film critic Natalino Bruzzone wrote: "Tulpa has defects and failures, but its constant, uncertain balance between suspense, frightening visual style, grotesque and liberating sense of the absurd make it interesting".
