= Francesco Pannofino =

Italian actor and voice actor

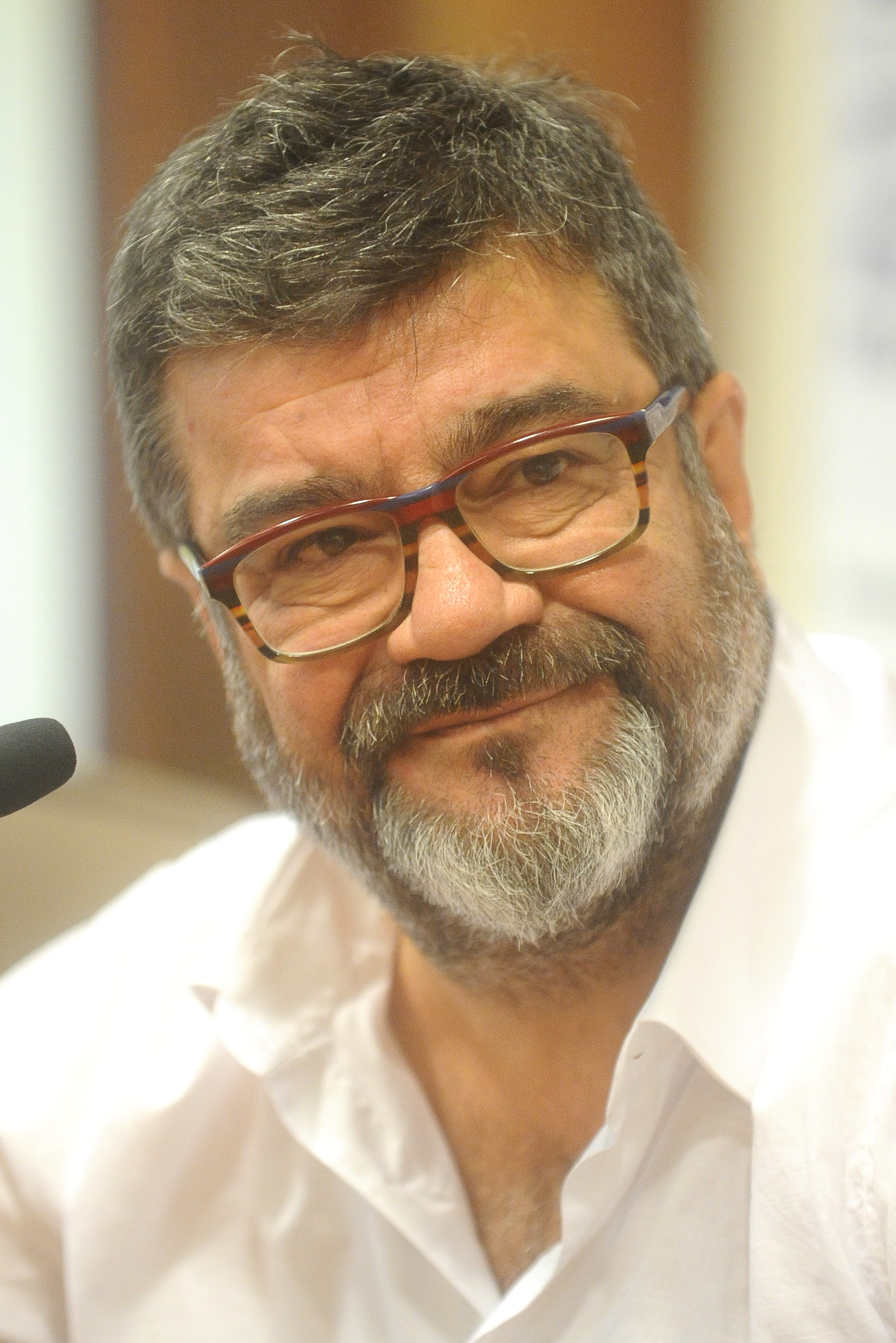
- Pannofino attending the Lucca Comics & Games convention in 2018
- Born: 14 November 1958 (age 67); Pieve di Teco, Italy
- Occupations: Actor; voice actor; dubbing director
- Years active: 1985–present
- Spouse(s): Emanuela Rossi (m. 1997; div. 2006) (m. 2011)
- Children: 1
- Relatives: Lino Pannofino (brother)

Francesco Pannofino (born 14 November 1958) is an Italian actor and voice actor.

== Biography ==
Born in Pieve di Teco, Pannofino's parents originated from Locorotondo. Sometime after 1972, he and his family moved to Rome. In 1978, while waiting for a bus to take him to university so that he could undergo an algebra exam, Pannofino heard the sound of gunshots coming from a street nearby: what he heard was in fact Aldo Moro being kidnapped; he would later write a song based on those events, Il sequestro di stato (i.e. State abduction), which appears in the soundtrack of Felice Farina's 2014 film Patria featuring him in the main role.

Pannofino began his career as a theatre actor at some point between the late 1970s and the early 1980s and as a screen actor during the mid-90s, appearing in many films and television series through the years; these include Giovanni Falcone – L'uomo che sfidò Cosa Nostra, in which he portrayed real life gangster Tommaso Buscetta, and Night Bus, starring Giovanna Mezzogiorno and Valerio Mastandrea, as well as the TV film Imperium: Pompeii. He is especially known for the role of frustrated TV director René Ferretti in the satirical TV series Boris, also contributing to the soundtrack with his own song Ciak (Italian onomatopeia indicating the clapperboard used to demand action while filming).

Pannofino is considered to be one of the most representative dubbers in the fifth generation of Italian voice actors and has dubbed a great number of characters into the Italian language. He is the official voice actor of George Clooney and Denzel Washington. Other actors he often or occasionally dubs include Kurt Russell, Wesley Snipes, Mickey Rourke, Dan Aykroyd, Antonio Banderas, Jean-Claude Van Damme, Philip Seymour Hoffman, Ray Winstone, Michael Madsen, Kiefer Sutherland, Daniel Day-Lewis and Kevin Spacey (the latter of which is mainly dubbed by Roberto Pedicini).

Pannofino performed the Italian voices of characters such as Rubeus Hagrid (portrayed by Robbie Coltrane) in the Harry Potter franchise (which includes narrating the official audiobooks), the Green Goblin (portrayed by Willem Dafoe) in Sam Raimi's Spider-Man trilogy, Gil Grissom (portrayed by William Petersen) in CSI: Crime Scene Investigation, Budd (portrayed by Michael Masden) in Kill Bill: Volume 1 and Kill Bill: Volume 2 and the title character (portrayed by Tom Hanks) in Forrest Gump. In his animated roles, he performed the Italian voices of Papi in the Beverly Hills Chihuahua film series, The Red Guy in Cow and Chicken and I Am Weasel, Lrrr in the first five seasons of Futurama and many more.

== Personal life ==
Pannofino is married to actress and voice actress Emanuela Rossi, with whom he had a son, Andrea, who also became an actor and voice actor; the two actors separated in 2006, but later reunited and married a second time in 2011, although, by mutual agreement, the two chose not to live together again. He is a fan of soccer team Lazio, a passion that he developed in the mid-70s when, as a teenager, he sold drinks in the stands of the Olympic Stadium in Rome.

== Filmography ==
=== Cinema ===
- Croce e delizia [it] (1995)
- That's Life (1998)
- Free the Fish (2000)
- Fatti della banda della Magliana (2005)
- Night Bus (2007)
- Lessons in Chocolate (2007)
- This Night Is Still Ours (2008)
- Pinocchio (2008)
- L'uomo fiammifero (2009)
- Different from Whom? (2009)
- Just Married (2009)
- Me and Marilyn (2009)
- Scontro di civiltà per un ascensore a Piazza Vittorio [it] (2010)
- Men vs. Women (2010)
- Boris: The Film (2011)
- Faccio un salto all'Avana (2011)
- Poker Generation (2012)
- Workers - Pronti a tutto (2012)
- Operazione vacanze (2012)
- L'arbitro (2013)
- Il pretore (2014)
- Ogni maledetto Natale (2014)
- Patria [it] (2014)
- Le frise ignoranti (2015)
- Burning Love (2015)
- Solo [it] (2016)
- My Father Jack (2016)
- The Man Who Bought the Moon (2018)
- The Match (2019)
- A mano disarmata
- Nati 2 volte (2019)
- La banda dei tre (2019)
- Il caso Pantani - L'omicidio di un campione (2020)
- Si muore solo da vivi (2020)
- Uomini da marciapiede (2022)
- Lo sposo indeciso che non poteva o forse non voleva più uscire dal bagno (2023)
- La guerra del Tiburtino III (2023)
- Gli addestratori (2024)

=== Television ===
- Linda e il brigadiere - TV series, season 3, episode 2 (1998)
- Una donna per amico – TV series (2001)
- La squadra – TV series, 9 episodes (2001)
- Judas - TV film (2001)
- Carabinieri – TV series, season 5, episode 1 (2002)
- Distretto di Polizia – TV series, episode 5, season 8 (2005)
- Try again teacher! – TV series, season 1, episode 1 and 3 (2005)
- Questa è la mia terra – TV series (2006)
- Giovanni Falcone - L'uomo che sfidò Cosa Nostra – TV miniseries (2006)
- Imperium: Pompeii - TV miniseries (2007)
- Piloti - TV series, season 1, episode 5 (2007)
- Il generale Dalla Chiesa – TV minisereies (2007)
- Boris – TV series (2007-2010, 2022)
- Pinocchio – TV miniseries (2008)
- Un caso di coscienza – TV series, 6 episodes (2009-2010)
- I Cesaroni – TV series (2009-2012)
- Un medico in famiglia – TV series, 1 episode (2009)
- La nuova squadra – TV series (2011)
- Camera Café – TV series, 1 episode (2011)
- Nero Wolfe [it] – TV series (2012)
- Heiraten ist auch keine Lösung – TV film (2012)
- Una notte da paura - TV film (2012)
- Adriano Olivetti - La forza di un sogno – TV miniseries (2013)
- La farfalla granata – TV film (2013)
- Romolo + Giuly: La guerra mondiale italiana – TV series (2018)
- Inspector Coliandro – TV series, season 7, episode 1 (2018)
- Enrico Piaggio - Un sogno italiano - TV film (2019)
- Ostaggi (film) – TV film (2021)
- No Activity - Niente da segnalare – TV series (2024)

== Voice work ==
=== Live action voice roles ===
- Narrator in Via Veneto Set – documentary (2006), Zero - Inchiesta sull'11 settembre – documentary (2007), Coincidenze – short film (2010), La vita è arte. Renato Guttuso, l'artista e il suo tempo – documentary (2011), Padre Pio costruttore di misericordia – documentary (2016), Meraviglie – documentary series (2018-2022), Io, Leonardo, Being With Refugees – documentary (2020), Vaccari – documentary (2020), Dentro il Quirinale - Il palazzo degli italiani – documentary (2020), La Divina Commedia VR: l'Inferno, un Viaggio Immersivo – short film (2022), Il tempio della velocità – documentary (2022)
- Guido Picelli in Il ribelle [it] – documentary (2011)
- Rasputin in Rasputin - La verità supera la leggenda (2011)
- Clown in Cuore di clown – short film (2011)
- Spam in Doggywood
- Marshal in Toilet [it] (2022)

==== Italian-dubbed roles ====
- Rubeus Hagrid in Harry Potter and the Philosopher's Stone, Harry Potter and the Chamber of Secrets, Harry Potter and the Prisoner of Azkaban, Harry Potter and the Goblet of Fire, Harry Potter and the Order of the Phoenix, Harry Potter and the Half-Blood Prince, Harry Potter and the Deathly Hallows – Part 1, Harry Potter and the Deathly Hallows – Part 2
- Major General Henry “Hank” Landry in Stargate SG-1, Stargate Atlantis, Stargate: The Ark of Truth, Stargate: Continuum
- Norman Osborn / Green Goblin in Spider-Man, Spider-Man 2, Spider-Man 3, Spider-Man: No Way Home
- Mark Hoffman in Saw IV, Saw V, Saw VI, Saw 3D
- Eric Brooks / Blade in Blade, Blade II, Blade: Trinity
- Danny Ocean in Ocean's Eleven, Ocean's Twelve, Ocean's Thirteen
- Devlin in Spy Kids, Spy Kids 3-D: Game Over
- Xander Cage in XXX, XXX: Return of Xander Cage
- Budd in Kill Bill: Volume 1, Kill Bill: Volume 2
- Robert McCall in The Equalizer, The Equalizer 2
- Hound in Transformers: Age of Extinction, Transformers: The Last Knight
- Vince in The Fast and the Furious, Fast Five
- Luc Deveraux/GR-44 in Universal Soldier, Universal Soldier: The Return
- Gil Grissom in CSI: Crime Scene Investigation, CSI: Vegas
- Parnell Steven "Stackz" Edwards, Ed and Inspector Deacy in Goodfellas
- Kwang and Clive in Licence to Kill
- Captain Hanson and Tonane in Stargate SG-1
- Jeff Spicoli in Fast Times at Ridgemont High
- Steve Biko in Cry Freedom
- Carlos in Women on the Verge of a Nervous Breakdown
- Tom Everett in Caddyshack II
- Oscar Wallace in The Untouchables
- Jack in A Time of Destiny
- Jake Edward Briggs in She's Having a Baby
- Jim in We're No Angels (1989 film)
- Sergeant Tony Meserve in Casualties of War
- 1st Lieutenant Ivan Putin in The Hunt for Red October
- George Lazan in Postcards from the Edge
- Bradley in Regarding Henry
- Lieutenant Stephen "Bull" McCaffrey/Captain Dennis McCaffrey in Backdraft
- Giovanni in Year of the Gun
- Commander Peter Krill in Under Siege
- Malcolm X in Malcolm X (1992 film)
- Raul in Jamón jamón
- Raymond Hill in The Waterdance
- Newland Archer in The Age of Innocence
- Sean Miller in Patriot Games
- Eddie Lomax in The Firm (1993 film)
- Gray Grantham in The Pelican Brief
- Joe Miller in Philadelphia
- Marcos in Outrage!
- Sam Gillen in Nowhere to Run (1993 film)
- Wilek Chilowicz in Schindler's List
- Spike in Super Mario Bros.
- Sonny Black in Donnie Brasco
- Forrest Gump in Forrest Gump
- Max Walker in Timecop
- Fred Flintstone in The Flintstones
- Wyatt Earp in Tombstone
- Jack O'Neill in Stargate
- David Grant in Executive Decision
- Napoleon Stone in Heart Condition
- Bleek Gilliam in Mo' Better Blues
- Colonel Guile in Street Fighter (1994 film)
- Antonio in Miami Rhapsody
- Art Dodge in Two Much
- Ezekiel "Easy" Rawlins in Devil in a Blue Dress
- Florence Nightingale in Fall Time
- John Doe in Seven (1995 film)
- John Reilly in Sleepers
- Miguel Bain in Assassins (1995 film)
- Scars in The Quick and the Dead (1995 film)
- Butch "Bullet" Stein in Bullet (1996 film)
- Jack Lambert in Getting Away with Murder
- Jack Taylor in One Fine Day
- Long John Silver in Muppet Treasure Island
- Rufus Buckley in A Time to Kill (1996 film)
- Sergeant Gianni Tricarico in Marching in Darkness
- Alain Moreau / Mikhail Suverov in Maximum Risk
- Bobby Rayburn in The Fan (1996 film)
- Christopher Dubois in The Quest (1996 film)
- Jim Williams in Midnight in the Garden of Good and Evil
- Jack Paul Quinn in Double Team
- Max Carlyle in One Night Stand (1997 film)
- Thomas Devoe in The Peacemaker (1997 film)
- Armand in Interview with the Vampire
- Chris Sabian in The Negotiator
- Jack Crow in Vampires (1998 film)
- John Hobbes in Fallen (1998 film)
- Mark J. Sheridan in U.S. Marshals
- Jack Foley in Out of Sight
- Lincoln Rhyme in The Bone Collector
- Pierre Brochant in The Dinner Game
- Archie Gates in Three Kings (1999 film)
- Pepe the King Prawn in Muppets from Space
- Gal Dove in Sexy Beast
- Michael Lynch in Ordinary Decent Criminal
- Herman Boone in Remember the Titans
- Alonzo Harris in Training Day
- Jan in Animal Factory
- Kevin Spacey in Austin Powers in Goldmember
- Chris Magruder in The Curse of the Jade Scorpion
- Curtis McCabe in Vanilla Sky
- Frank Grillo in Earth vs. the Spider (2001 film)
- George in Merry Christmas (2001 film)
- Governor Lewis in Evolution (2001 film)
- Luis Antonio Vargas in Original Sin
- Michael Zane in 3000 Miles to Graceland
- Ulysses Everett McGill in O Brother, Where Art Thou?
- Billy Tyne in The Perfect Storm
- Captain Ives in Interstate 60
- Chris Kelvin in Solaris (2002 film)
- Dean Trumbell in Punch-Drunk Love
- Freddy Lounds in Red Dragon (2002 film)
- Jim Byrd in Confessions of a Dangerous Mind
- John Quincy Archibald in John Q.
- Max Beasley in Unconditional Love (2002 film)
- Nicolas Bardo in Femme Fatale (2002 film)
- William "Bill the Butcher" Cutting in Gangs of New York
- Matthias Lee Whitlock in Out of Time (2003 film)
- Miles Massey in Intolerable Cruelty
- Roman Pearce in 2 Fast 2 Furious
- T.J. in My Boss's Daughter
- Felix in Collateral
- John W. Creasy in Man on Fire (2004 film)
- Bennett Marco in The Manchurian Candidate (2004 film)
- Bob Barnes in Syriana
- Herb Brooks in Miracle (2004 film)
- Joseph Keats in 50 First Dates
- Sandy Lyle in Along Came Polly
- Ben Crane in Dreamer (2005 film)
- Jeremiah Ecks in Ballistic: Ecks vs. Sever
- Steve Stronghold in Sky High (2005 film)
- Lorenz / Jason York in Chaos (2005 Capitol film)
- Jacob Geismer in The Good German
- Jack Tuliver in 7 Seconds
- Jeremy Grey in Wedding Crashers
- Ed Moseby in Domino (2005 film)
- George Deckart in XXX: State of the Union
- Major Lincoln in Jarhead
- Vic Frohmeyer in Christmas with the Kranks
- Alex Dimitrios in Casino Royale (2006 film)
- Alfonso Diaz in Bordertown (2006 film)
- Bruno Fella in Breaking and Entering
- Darrius Sayle in Stormbreaker
- Douglas Carlin in Déjà Vu (2006 film)
- Keith Frazier in Inside Man
- John Ammer in Click (2006 film)
- Michael Clayton in Michael Clayton
- Owen Davian in Mission: Impossible III
- Pierre Dulaine in Take the Lead
- Sam Keenan in Second in Command
- Beowulf in Beowulf (2007 film)
- Daniel Plainview in There Will Be Blood
- Gust Avrakotos in Charlie Wilson's War
- James Jackson Dial in The Contractor
- Jimmy "Dodge" Connelly in Leatherheads
- Mike McKay in Death Proof
- Armand Degas in Killshot
- the Chechen in The Dark Knight
- George "Mac" McHale in Indiana Jones and the Kingdom of the Crystal Skull
- Harry Pfarrer in Burn After Reading
- Kristic in Get Smart
- Neil Shaw in The Art of War II: Betrayal
- The Punisher in Punisher: War Zone
- Randall Bragg in Appaloosa
- Robin Ramzinski in The Wrestler
- Johnny Whitefeather in Imagine That
- Lyn Cassady in The Men Who Stare at Goats
- Ryan Bingham in Up in the Air (2009 film)
- The Count in The Boat That Rocked
- Walter Garber in The Taking of Pelham 123 (2009 film)
- Frank Barnes in Unstoppable
- Jack / Edward in The American (2010 film)
- Mr. Griffith in Easy A
- Winston Churchill in The King's Speech
- Eli in The Book of Eli
- Ivan Vanko in Iron Man 2
- Mike Morris in The Ides of March (2011 film)
- Matt King in The Descendants
- King Hyperion in Immortals (2011 film)
- Lancaster Dodd in The Master (2012 film)
- Tobin Frost in Safe House
- Whip Whitaker in Flight
- Bobby Trench in 2 Guns
- Matt Kowalski in Gravity
- Seymour Heller in Behind the Candelabra
- Xander in Enemies Closer
- Günther Bachmann in A Most Wanted Man
- Mickey Scarpato in God's Pocket
- Frank Stokes in The Monuments Men
- Frank Walker in Tomorrowland
- Baird Whitlock in Hail, Caesar!
- Lee Gates in Money Monster
- Frank in The Gambler (2014 film)
- Tubal-cain in Noah (2014 film)
- Emcee in Pixels (2015 film)
- John Ruth in The Hateful Eight
- Stanley in The Gunman (2015 film)
- Sam Chisholm in The Magnificent Seven (2016 film)
- Troy Maxson in Fences
- Jimmy Harrell in Deepwater Horizon
- Roman J. Israel in Roman J. Israel, Esq.
- Lieutenant Scheisskopf in Catch-22
- Randy Miller / Narrator in Once Upon a Time in Hollywood

=== Animated roles ===
- Mustafà/Wolf and Tenebrone in Pipì, Pupù e Rosmarina in Il mistero delle note rapite (English title: Pipi, Pupu & Rosemary: the Mystery of the Stolen Notes)
- Rospoleon in Yaya e Lennie - The Walking Liberty
- Maccabeo in Hanukkah - La festa delle luci
- Gufo (Owl) in Lupo racconta la SMA

==== Italian-dubbed roles ====
- Papi in Beverly Hills Chihuahua, Beverly Hills Chihuahua 2, Beverly Hills Chihuahua 3: Viva la Fiesta!
- Lord Rothbart in The Swan Princess, The Swan Princess: The Mystery of the Enchanted Kingdom
- The Red Guy in Cow and Chicken, I Am Weasel
- Whenua in Bionicle 2: Legends of Metru Nui, Bionicle 3: Web of Shadows
- Grug Crood in The Croods, The Croods: A New Age
- Bomb in The Angry Birds Movie, The Angry Birds Movie 2
- Conductor, Santa Claus, Hobo Ghost and Narrator in The Polar Express
- Raven, Hakon and Egon in Gargoyles
- Skunky Skunk, Mad Hatter and minor characters in Bonkers
- Arpo Butcher and Ram Punchington in Sons of Butcher
- Itchiford "Itchy" Dachshund in All Dogs Go to Heaven 2
- General Von Talon in Valiant
- Mr. Fox in Fantastic Mr. Fox
- Lrrr in Futurama (seasons 1–5)
- Chief Ted Grizzly in Hoodwinked!
- Tiger in An American Tail: Fievel Goes West
- Daffy Duck in Who Framed Roger Rabbit
- Captain Gutt in Ice Age: Continental Drift
- Sid in Flushed Away
- Featherstone in Gnomeo & Juliet
- Master Storming Ox in Kung Fu Panda 2
- Sam in Cats & Dogs
- Grimroth "Grim" Razz in Ratchet & Clank
- Grundel in Thumbelina
- George Clooney in Team America: World Police
- Pinky in Rock-a-Doodle
- Hanover Fiste / Dr. Anrak in Heavy Metal (1996 redub)
- Double Dan in Ralph Breaks the Internet
- Mr. Mulch in Wallace & Gromit: The Curse of the Were-Rabbit
- Cookie Monster in The Adventures of Elmo in Grouchland
- Mayor in Boo, Zino & the Snurks
- Jeager Clade in Strange World
- Nicholas St. North in Rise of the Guardians
- Barney the Encyclocentipedia in ChalkZone

=== Video games ===
- Blackbeard in Assassin's Creed IV: Black Flag
- Colonel Hathi in The Jungle Book Groove Party
