= Enrico Silvestrin =

Italian television presenter, actor and singer-songwriter

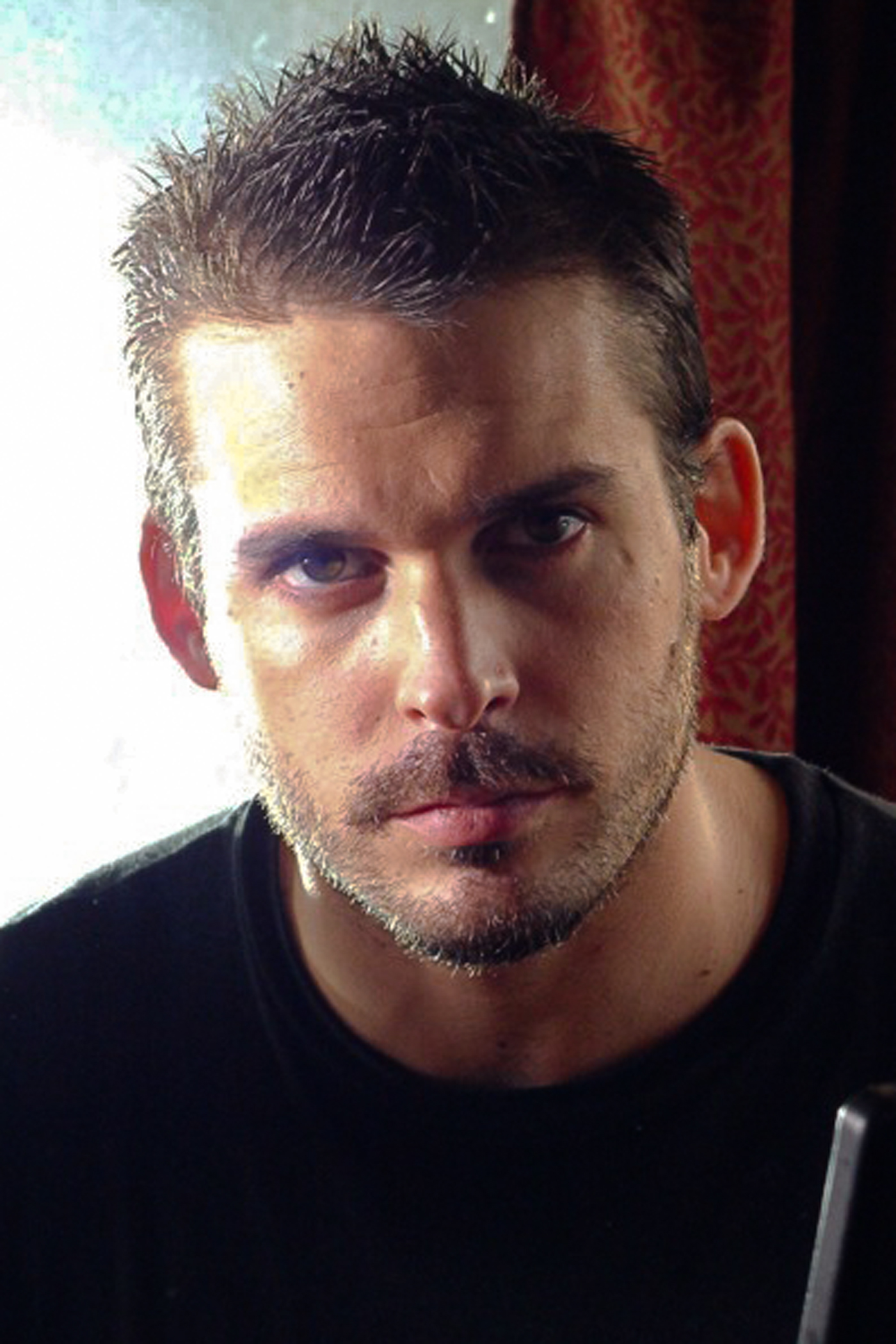
- Born: 30 May 1972 (age 52); Rome, Italy
- Occupation(s): Actor; Presenter
- Years active: 1994-present

Enrico Silvestrin (born 30 May 1972) is an Italian actor, television and radio presenter and musician.

== Life and career ==
Born in Rome, after a supporting role in Michele Placido's Close Friends, in 1994 Silvestrin started working as a VJ on MTV Europe, and later on MTV Italy. In 2000, he refused the Gabriele Muccino's offer of starring in The Last Kiss preferring a role in the Italia 1 sitcom Via Zanardi 33, which eventually turned to be a flop.

In 2005 Silvestrin left MTV as to focus on his acting career. He then appeared in a number of films and TV-series, getting a personal success with the role of Alessandro Berti in the Canale 5 crime series Distretto di Polizia. In 2007 he presented the Festivalbar. In 2018 he competed in Grande Fratello VIP, the Italian adaptation of Celebrity Big Brother. He was the third contestant to be evicted on day 22.

Silvestrin is also active as a musician. He has been part of the musical groups Agony in Cage, Tempus Fugit, Ilor and Silv3man. He is nephew on his mother's side of actor and playwright Peppino De Filippo.

== Selected filmography ==
- Close Friends (1992)
- Ecco fatto (1998)
- But Forever in My Mind (1999)
- Deceit (1999)
- Via Zanardi 33 (TV, 2001)
- Remember Me, My Love (2003)
- What Will Happen to Us (2004)
- Floor 17 (2005)
- L'ispettore Coliandro (TV, 2006)
- The Last House in the Woods (2006)
- Distretto di Polizia (TV, 2006-2008)
- I delitti del cuoco (TV, 2010)
