= Ti presento un amico =

2010 film

- Theatrical release poster
- Directed by: Carlo Vanzina
- Written by: Carlo Vanzina; Enrico Vanzina
- Produced by: Alessandro Fracassi
- Starring: Raoul Bova; Barbora Bobuľová; Martina Stella; Kelly Reilly; Stefano Dionisi; Sarah Felberbaum
- Cinematography: Carlo Tafani
- Edited by: Raimondo Crociani
- Music by: Federico De Robertis
- Production companies: Media One S.P.A.; Warner Bros. Entertainment Italia
- Distributed by: Warner Bros. Pictures
- Release date: 12 November 2010
- Running time: 103 minutes
- Country: Italy
- Language: Italian

Ti presento un amico is a 2010 Italian romantic comedy film directed by Carlo Vanzina.

== Plot ==
Marco Ferretti is an Italian manager who is young and beautiful, but he cannot stand the presence of women after a difficult affair. When Marco goes to Milan for an appointment, he meets four beautiful girls who disrupt his life with love.

== Cast ==
- Raoul Bova as Marco Ferretti
- Barbora Bobuľová as Giulia Lombardi
- Martina Stella as Gabriella Amoruso
- Kelly Reilly as Sarah Johnson
- Sarah Felberbaum as Francesca Berardi
- Stefano Dionisi as Giorgio Antonio Roversi
- Carlo Giuseppe Gabardini as Riccardo Tardini
- Paolo Calabresi as Antonio "Tony" Martini
- Teco Celio as Herr Volker
