= Nessuno come noi =

2018 Italian romantic drama film

- Film poster
- Directed by: Volfango De Biasi
- Written by: Luca Bianchini (story); Volfango de Biasi; Tiziana Martini
- Produced by: Fulvio Lucisano; Federica Lucisano
- Starring: Alessandro Preziosi; Sarah Felberbaum
- Cinematography: Roberto Forza
- Edited by: Stefano Chierchiè
- Music by: Michele Braga
- Release date: October 18, 2018 (Italy)
- Running time: 100 minutes
- Country: Italy
- Language: Italian

Nessuno come noi (lit. 'Nobody like us') is a 2018 Italian romantic drama film directed by Volfango De Biasi.

== Cast ==
- Alessandro Preziosi as Umberto Fioravanti
- Sarah Felberbaum as Betty Bottone
- Christiane Filangieri as Ludovica Martinelli
- Elisa Di Eusanio as Susi
- Vincenzo Crea as Vince
- Leonardo Pazzagli as Romeo Fioravanti
- Sabrina Martina as Cate
- Davide Campagna as Sergio
