= Ugly Nasty People =

- Film poster
- Italian: Brutti e cattivi
- Directed by: Cosimo Gomez
- Written by: Luca Infascelli; Cosimo Gomez
- Produced by: Luca Barbareschi
- Starring: Claudio Santamaria; Marco D'Amore; Sara Serraiocco
- Cinematography: Vittorio Omodei Zorini
- Edited by: Mauro Bonanni
- Distributed by: 01 Distribution
- Release date: 19 October 2017 (Italy)
- Running time: 87 minutes
- Country: Italy
- Language: Italian

Ugly Nasty People (Italian: Brutti e cattivi) is a 2017 Italian heist comedy film directed by Cosimo Gomez.

== Cast ==
- Claudio Santamaria as The Duck
- Marco D'Amore as Giorgio Armani, aka "Shit"
- Sara Serraiocco as Rosabella "Ballerina" Terzi, the armless dancer
- Simoncino Martucci as Plissé
- Narcisse Mame as Don Charles
- Aline Belibi as Perla
- Giorgio Colangeli as Commissioner Parisi
- Filippo Dini as The Chicken
- Rosa Canova as Katia
- Fabiano Lioi as Senna
- Maria Chiara Augenti as Mimma
- Adamo Dionisi as Walter Masini
- Rinat Khismatouline as Borush
- Yang Shi as Shi Juan
- Guo Qiang Xu as Boss Shi Peijun
