= The Match (2019 film) =

2019 Italian drama film

- Film poster
- Italian: La partita
- Directed by: Francesco Carnesecchi
- Written by: Francesco Carnesecchi
- Starring: Francesco Pannofino; Alberto Di Stasio; Giorgio Colangeli
- Distributed by: Netflix Originals
- Release dates: July 2019 (Taormina); February 27, 2020
- Running time: 94 minutes
- Country: Italy
- Language: Italian

The Match (Italian: La partita) is a 2019 Italian drama film directed and written by Francesco Carnesecchi and starring Francesco Pannofino, Alberto Di Stasio and Giorgio Colangeli.

== Cast ==
- Francesco Pannofino as Claudio Bulla
- Alberto Di Stasio as Italo
- Giorgio Colangeli as Umberto
- Gabriele Fiore as Antonio
- Daniele Mariani as Leo
- Lidia Vitale as Roberta
- Fabrizio Sabatucci as Paolo
- Veruska Rossi as Gianna
- Simone Liberati as Ragazzo in macchina
- Giulia Schiavo as Ragazza in macchina
- Giada Fradeani as Laura
- Efisio Sanna as Ettore
- Stefano Ambrogi as Cristian
- Francesca Antonelli as Tifosa
- Giulia Cragnotti as Giulietta
