= The Jewel (2011 film) =

2011 film

- Film poster
- Directed by: Andrea Molaioli
- Written by: Andrea Molaioli; Ludovica Rampoldi; Gabriele Romagnoli
- Produced by: Francesca Cima
- Starring: Toni Servillo; Remo Girone; Sarah Felberbaum
- Cinematography: Luca Bigazzi
- Edited by: Giogiò Franchini
- Music by: Teho Teardo
- Release date: 4 March 2011
- Running time: 110 minutes
- Country: Italy
- Languages: Italian; English

The Jewel (Italian: Il gioiellino) is a 2011 Italian drama film directed by Andrea Molaioli. The film was mainly shot in Acqui Terme and its surroundings, including the ancient palace former seat of the Court, and in Turin. Other shots were taken in New York, Moscow-Russia.

== Cast ==
- Toni Servillo as Ernesto Botta
- Remo Girone as Amanzio Rastelli
- Sarah Felberbaum as Laura Aliprandi
- Fausto Maria Sciarappa as Franco Schianchi
- Lino Guanciale as Filippo Magnaghi
- Vanessa Compagnucci as Barbara Magnaghi
- Lisa Galantini as Segretaria
- Renato Carpentieri as Crusco
- Gianna Paola Scaffidi as Augusta Rastelli
- Maurizio Marchetti as Giulio Fontana
- Igor Chernevich as Igor Yashenko
- Jay O. Sanders as Mr. Rothman

== See also ==
- Parmalat bankruptcy
