= Besieged (film) =

- Theatrical release poster
- Directed by: Bernardo Bertolucci
- Screenplay by: Bernardo Bertolucci; Clare Peploe
- Based on: "The Siege" by James Lasdun
- Produced by: Massimo Cortesi
- Starring: Thandiwe Newton; David Thewlis; Claudio Santamaria
- Cinematography: Fabio Cianchetti
- Edited by: Jacopo Quadri
- Music by: Alessio Vlad
- Distributed by: Fine Line Features
- Release dates: September 14, 1998 (Toronto); May 21, 1999 (USA)
- Running time: 93 minutes
- Box office: $2,048,740

Besieged (Italian title: L'assedio) is a 1998 film by Bernardo Bertolucci starring Thandie Newton and David Thewlis. The film is based on the short story "The Siege" by James Lasdun and was supposed to be a 60-minute teleplay until Bertolucci chose to expand it.

== Plot ==
The film opens in an unnamed African town where Shandurai (Thandiwe Newton) watches with distress as a school teacher is taken away by police.

In Rome, Shandurai is now a housemaid for Jason Kinsky (David Thewlis), an eccentric English pianist and composer, and is also a promising medical student. Kinsky is in love with Shandurai, sending gifts down to her room via the dumbwaiter. One gift is a ring, which leads to an impassioned marriage proposal, which she rejects. Asked how he could make her love him, she shouts, “Get my husband out of jail!” Only then does Kinsky realize that Shandurai is married.

Shandurai notices a tapestry and some figurines she had dusted are now missing. Later, Kinsky begins composing using Shandurai, vacuuming nearby, as his muse. Hearing his piano riffs, she begins to fall in love herself.

Kinsky bargains with an African priest over an undisclosed transaction. Coming home from the school, Shandurai looks up to see Kinsky's piano being lowered into a truck; he has sold it. From a letter, she discovers that Kinsky has raised the money to secure her husband's release. He is coming to Rome. The night before his arrival, Shandurai unbuttons the sleeping Kinsky's shirt and curls up with him in bed. Morning arrives with her husband ringing the doorbell below. Shandurai at first does not react. Then she gets up, and the film ends with her husband still waiting by the door.

== Cast ==
- Thandiwe Newton as Shandurai (credited as Thandie Newton)
- David Thewlis as Jason Kinsky
- Claudio Santamaria as Agostino
- John C. Ojwang as Singer
- Massimo De Rossi as Patient
- Cyril Nri as Priest

== Production ==
Clare Peploe first suggested adapting James Lasdun's short story "The Siege", which first appeared in the author's 1985 book The Silver Age (published in the United States as Delirium Eclipse and Other Stories). Bertolucci conceived the project as a one-hour television movie, but expanded it for theatrical release after seeing the rushes projected on a large screen. It nonetheless remained a low-budget film with a small crew and a brisk shooting schedule of 20-25 scenes each day, roughly four times the director's usual pace. By Peploe's and Bertolucci's own account, the project, Bertolucci's first love story, was a particularly apt one for them as a married couple. Peploe served as both screenwriter and, informally, as co-director.

The short story differed from the screen play in three significant ways: it was set in London, not Rome; the woman came from Latin America, not Africa; and Kinsky was depicted as fat and much older than he was in the film. Peploe added a character, Shandurai's friend Agostino, as a way to contrast Shandurai's sociability with Kinsky's social awkwardness. In structuring the story, Bertolucci was intent on minimizing the exposition, leaving it to the audience to piece together the relationships between characters. Thewlis too had to guess about his character's origins and motivations: Kinsky's character was conceived as an "enigma" with no backstory, other than that he had inherited his villa from an aunt.

Most of the action was filmed and set at 8 vicolo del Bottino in Rome. The villa is currently being operated by the nearby Hotel Hassler as a separate boutique hotel named Il Palazzetto. As Bertolucci and Peploe first encountered it, the villa was as depicted at the end of the film, a largely unfurnished home with bare walls and an overgrown garden. But the home met the director's criteria for a spiral staircase, and Bertolucci liked the exterior for its two contrasting facades, one overlooking a narrow street leading to a subway station, the other adjacent to the Spanish Steps. The street scenes in both locations were filmed with a hidden camera, allowing the actors to interact with passersby. Throughout the film, a hand-held camera was used for about half the shots.

The African sequences that open the film and appear occasionally thereafter were shot last, over four days in Naivasha, Kenya, with an aerial shot of Lake Turkana, although no specific African country was identified or implied. After viewing the African footage, Bertolucci re-cut the first half-hour of the adjoining sequences set in Rome.

== Reception ==
The aggregator site Rotten Tomatoes gave Besieged a 75% rating among critics from 48 reviews.

Stephen Holden in the New York Times found the film's minimal dialogue a refreshing departure in what he termed the age of television psychobabble. He called the Besieged "a purposefully romantic exploration of the nonverbal connections between people that can blossom into love. Filled with rich, glinting images of the world imagined as a confusingly lovely mosaic, the movie has one of the sparsest screenplays of any film released this year. For the feelings that this love story examines are built up more through music than through talking, and through mysterious deeds, carried out by one character and observed by the other, that don't seem to add up. Even after the story ends, a lurking sense of mystery hovers."

Conversely, Roger Ebert's review was very negative, giving the film 1 out of 4 stars and calling it "a movie about whether two people with nothing in common, who have no meaningful conversations, will have sex--even if that means dismissing everything we have learned about the woman. It is also about whether we will see her breasts. How can a director of such sophistication, in a film of such stylistic grace, tell such a shallow and evasive story? But wait. The film also involves race, politics and culture, and reduces them all to convenient plot points. The social values in this movie would not have been surprising in a film made 40 years ago, but to see them seriously proposed [in 1999] is astonishing."

At the 1999 Ciak d'oro Awards, named after the magazine of the same name, the film won Best Editing for Jacopo Quadri.

== Influence ==
Despite dissimilar themes, the 2002 film City of God, which depicts gangs in Rio de Janeiro, drew inspiration from Besieged. Director Fernando Meirelles, who trained as an architect, liked Bertolucci's use of physical space, which served to show Shandurai's early sense of dislocation and eventual sense of place. Bertolucci achieved this by first using long focal length lenses, then shifting to shorter focal lengths as the movie progressed, thereby widening the view and deepening the focus. As a result, said Meirelles, the audience begins "to see where the stairs lead, and Bertolucci begins to explain the geography. In almost the last shot, the camera looks out from the roof of the house, which by now you really know; I could draw this house. Then it pans across the metro and the square behind the building and you see the house in the world. The story begins in a labyrinth and at the end you understand everything." Meirelles took the reverse approach with City of God, transitioning from 32mm and 40mm shots of the skyline to longer focal-length shots of alleyways to convey a feeling of entrapment.

== See also ==
- Movies about immigration to Italy
