= Night Bus (2007 film) =

- Film poster
- Italian: Notturno bus
- Directed by: Davide Marengo
- Cinematography: Arnaldo Catinari
- Release date: May 11, 2007
- Running time: 105 minutes
- Country: Italy
- Language: Italian

Night Bus (Italian: Notturno bus) is a 2007 Italian noir-comedy film directed by Davide Marengo. A low-budget film, it became a sleeper box office hit.

== Plot ==
Set in Rome, Davide Marengo's crime story revolves around two main characters, a female thief, Leila (Mezzogiorno), whose modus operandi of looting her victims is by administering drugs or seducing them, and a lonely bus driver, Franz (Mastandrea), who is up to his neck in debt. The real story advances when the duo happens to come into possession of a valuable microchip valued at 4 million euros. The film's plot comes across more twists as a pair of hardened criminals, Garafano (Pannofino) and Diolaiti (Citran), and a retired intelligence officer, Carlo Matera (Fantastichini), enter the scene.

== Cast ==
- Giovanna Mezzogiorno as Leila Ronchi
- Valerio Mastandrea as Franz
- Ennio Fantastichini as Carlo Matera
- Francesco Pannofino as Garofano
- Roberto Citran as Diolaiti
- Iaia Forte as Micia
- Ivan Franek as Andrea
- Marcello Mazzarella as Sandro
- Antonio Catania as Bergamini
- Sascha Zacharias as Alessia
- Mario Rivera as Titti
- Paolo Calabresi as Paolo
