= Alessandro Morace =

Italian actor

- Born: Alessandro Morace; Rome, Italy
- Years active: 2006─present
- Awards: Flaiano Film Festival for Best actor

Alessandro Morace is an Italian child actor.

He received a Best Actor award at the 2006 Flaiano Film Festival for the role of Tommaso (Tommi) Benetti in Kim Rossi Stuart's film Anche libero va bene (Along the Ridge).

In 2007 he played Fulvio Frisone in the TV film Il Figlio della luna.

== Musical career ==
Since the autumn of 2012 he plays the banjo and the guitar in a folk rock band, "Old River Folks". In 2013 they released their first EP "Flower of Sighs".
