= Sacred Heart (film) =

- Film poster
- Directed by: Ferzan Özpetek
- Written by: Ferzan Özpetek; Gianni Romoli
- Produced by: Tilde Corse; Gianni Romoli
- Starring: Barbora Bobuľová; Andrea Di Stefano; Lisa Gastoni
- Cinematography: Gianfilippo Corticelli
- Edited by: Patrizio Marone
- Music by: Andrea Guerra
- Release date: 25 February 2005
- Running time: 120 minutes
- Country: Italy
- Language: Italian

Sacred Heart (Italian: Cuore sacro) is a 2005 Italian drama film which tells the story of an Italian workaholic businesswoman Irene (Barbora Bobuľová) who experiences the loss of two of her friends by suicide. This loss, combined with her desire to sell off a piece of property that includes the living quarters of her eccentric mother, ends up sending her on a journey of emotional and spiritual transformation.

== Awards ==
The movie won the 2005 David di Donatello awards for Best Actress (Barbora Bobuľová) and Best Production Design (Andrea Crisanti). Other awards were won at the 2005 Flaiano Film Festival, including the Audience Award for Best Actress (Barbora Bobulova), Best Cinematography (Gianfilippo Corticelli), and Best Supporting Actress (Erika Blanc).

== Cast ==
- Barbora Bobuľová as Irene Ravelli
- Camille Dugay Comencini as Benny
- Lisa Gastoni as Eleonora Ravelli
- Massimo Poggio as Father Carras
- Gigi Angelillo as Aurelio
- Erika Blanc as Maria Clara Ravelli
- Andrea Di Stefano as Giancarlo
- Caterina Vertova as Angela Marchetti
- Stefano Santospago as Giorgio Marchetti
- Michela Cescon as Anna Maria
- Paolo Romano as Alberto
- Stefania Spugnini as Liliana
- Elisabetta Pozzi as Psychologist
