= One Hundred Nails =

2007 Italian drama film

- Italian: Centochiodi
- Directed by: Ermanno Olmi
- Written by: Ermanno Olmi
- Screenplay by: Ermanno Olmi
- Produced by: Luigi Musini
- Starring: Raz Degan
- Cinematography: Fabio Olmi
- Edited by: Paolo Cottignola
- Music by: Fabio Vacchi
- Production company: Rai Cinema
- Distributed by: Mikado Film
- Release date: 2007
- Running time: 92 minutes
- Country: Italy
- Language: Italian
- Budget: € 4,213,000
- Box office: $ 3,536,561

One Hundred Nails (Italian: Centochiodi) is a 2007 Italian drama film directed by Ermanno Olmi, starring Raz Degan. It tells the story of a young professor who leaves his position at the University of Bologna to live in an old farmhouse by the river Po, where he gets involved with the local population. The film was shown as a Special Screening at the 2007 Cannes Film Festival. It received the Critics Award at the 2007 David di Donatello Awards and was nominated in eight more categories, including Best Film.

== Reception ==
Variety's Jay Weissberg called the film "disappointing" and wrote: "In many ways, One Hundred Nails harks back to Olmi's earliest films, with a touch of Pasolini, evident not only in the locations but also the largely nonpro cast. Fabio Olmi's lensing repeatedly returns to the river's calm, presenting a timeless land of purer values than those of the city, though lacking the richness of his last two pics with father Ermanno." Geoff Andrew of Time Out London described it as "a bizarre, elegant gem", and wrote: "Not unlike a latterday, more effective Miracle in Milan, this profoundly Catholic, profoundly personal fable veers, like many Olmi films, between the seemingly inept and the spellbindingly innocent, magical in its tenderness, its striking visuals and its unpredictability. Don't miss – but give it time."
