= The Roses of the Desert =

Le rose del deserto
- Theatrical poster
- Directed by: Mario Monicelli
- Written by: Alessandro Bencivenni; Suso Cecchi d'Amico; Mario Monicelli; Domenico Saverni
- Based on: Il deserto della Libia by Mario Tobino
- Produced by: Mauro Berardi
- Starring: Michele Placido; Giorgio Pasotti; Alessandro Haber
- Cinematography: Saverio Guarna
- Edited by: Bruno Sarandrea
- Music by: Paolo Dossena; Mino Freda
- Release date: December 1, 2006
- Running time: 102 minutes
- Country: Italy
- Language: Italian

The Roses of the Desert (Italian: Le rose del deserto) is a 2006 Italian film directed by Mario Monicelli, in his final film, and was loosely inspired by the romance Il deserto della Libia of Mario Tobino.

== Plot ==
In World War II a group of Italian soldiers is sent to Egypt to provide assistance to the local population. The military, however, should expect other directives from the Duce Benito Mussolini but completely lose contact with the Italy. Soon the members of the brigade, which includes some very curious and picturesque characters such as the Captain who loves poetry, get acquainted with the local customs and forget their duty as soldiers. Again however the war impose its presence, after an encounter with an outspoken missionary (Michele Placido) who is walking through the desert with a troop of Germans. As hostilities begin again, the soldiers take up arms, but something has changed through their experience and they begin to consider war as useless, while they could live in blissful oblivion in a land so beautiful and rich in culture. These thoughts are cut short when the Captain, who alone had remained a reference figure for the troops, discovers that his recently deceased wife was not faithful. He commits suicide by jumping against the weapons of some Bedouin.

== Cast ==
- Michele Placido - Brother Simeone
- Giorgio Pasotti - Lieutenant Marcello Salvi
- Alessandro Haber - Major Stefano Strucchi
- Moran Atias - Aisha
- Danilo De Summa - soldier
- Tatti Sanguineti - a general
- Fulvio Falzarano - Sergeant Barzottin
- Claudio Bigagli - soldier
- Stefano Scandaletti - soldier
