= Claudio Santamaria =

Italian actor

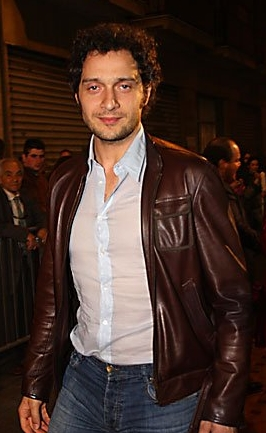
- Santamaria in 2008
- Born: Claudio Santamaria Ferraro; 22 July 1974 (age 52); Rome, Italy
- Occupation: Actor
- Years active: 1997–present

Claudio Santamaria Ferraro (born 22 July 1974) is an Italian actor. In 2016, he was awarded the David di Donatello for Best Actor award for portraying the superhero Enzo "Jeeg" Ceccotti in They Call Me Jeeg.

== Career ==
His cinema debut came in 1997, with Leonardo Pieraccioni's Fuochi d'artificio. His first important film roles are in Gabriele Muccino's first film Ecco fatto, and in the films Marco Risi's L'ultimo capodanno and Bernardo Bertolucci's L'assedio. He played the terrorist Carlos in Casino Royale. He was also the voice of Christian Bale in the Italian version of Batman Begins, The Dark Knight, The Dark Knight Rises, and the voice of Eric Bana in Munich.

== Filmography ==
=== Films ===
Year	Title	Role	Notes
1997	Fireworks	Er Banana	
1997	Dead Train	Andrea	Short film
1998	Kaputt Mundi	Cristiano Carucci	
1998	Besieged	Agostino	
1998	Ecco fatto	Pietro "Piterone" Ristuccia	
1999	The Building	Gianni	Short film
2000	Almost Blue	Simone Martini	
2001	The Last Kiss	Paolo	
2001	The Son's Room	Dive shop salesman	Cameo appearance
2001	Amarsi può darsi	Davide	
2002	Appuntamento al buio	Thief	Short film
2002	Paz!	Pentothal	
2002	Life as It Comes	Marco	
2003	Past Perfect	Andrea	
2003	The Soul's Place	Mario	
2004	The Card Player	Carlo Sturni	
2004	Agata and the Storm	Nico/Arturo	
2005	But When Do the Girls Get Here?	Nick	
2005	Romanzo Criminale	Bruno "Il Dandi" De Magistris	
2005	Melissa P.	Museum keeper	Cameo appearance
2006	Casino Royale	Carlos	
2006	Il quarto sesso	Jesus	Short film
2007	Apnea	Paolo	
2007	Fine pena mai	Antonio Perrone	
2008	Birdwatchers	Roberto	
2008	Aspettando il sole	Toni	
2009	The Case of Unfaithful Klara	Luca Castelli	
2010	Kiss Me Again	Paolo	
2010	600 Kilos d'Or Pur	Enzo	
2011	Drifters	Bruno	
2011	Terraferma	Revenue officer	Cameo appearance
2011	The First on the List	Pino Masi	
2012	Diaz - Don't Clean Up This Blood	Max Flamini	
2013	È stata lei	Nicola	Short film
2014	Greenery Will Bloom Again	The Major	
2014	The Lego Movie	Bruce Wayne / Batman (voice)	Italian voice-over
2014	Il venditore di medicine	Bruno Donati	
2015	They Call Me Jeeg	Enzo Ceccotti / Jeeg	
2017	The Lego Batman Movie	Bruce Wayne / Batman (voice)	Italian voice-over
2017	PIIGS	Narrator	Italian voice-over
2017	Ugly Nasty People	Il Papero	
2018	Forgive Us Our Debts	Guido	
2019	Tutto il mio folle amore	Willi	
2019	The Lego Movie 2: The Second Part	Bruce Wayne/Batman (voice)	Italian voice-over
2020	The Best Years	Riccardo Morozzi	
2021	Freaks Out	Fulvio	
2023	The Super Mario Bros. Movie	Mario	Italian dubbing
2023	My Summer with the Shark	Antonio Di Santi	
2023	Elf Me	Ciocca	
2024	The Return	Eumaeus	
2025	Madly	Eros	
	The Big Fake	il Sarto	
2026	Il rumore delle cose nuove		Paolo Genovese
TBA	In the Hand of Dante	TBA	Filming

=== Television ===
Year	Title	Role	Notes
1999	Ama il tuo nemico	Ernesto	Television film
2007	Rino Gaetano - Ma il cielo è sempre più blu	Rino Gaetano	Miniseries
2010	Le cose che restano	Andrea	Miniseries
2014	Non è mai troppo tardi	Alberto Manzi	Miniseries
2015–2018	È arrivata la felicità	Orlando Mieli	Main role
2022	Christian	Matteo	Main role

== Dubbing roles ==
- The Dark Knight Trilogy of Christopher Nolan films:
  - Batman Begins (2005)
  - The Dark Knight (2008)
  - The Dark Knight Rises (2012)
- Munich (2005)

=== Animation ===
Year	Title	Voice	Notes
2014	The LEGO Movie	Batman	
2017	The Lego Batman Movie	Batman	
2019	The Lego Movie 2: The Second Part	Batman	
2023	The Super Mario Bros. Movie	Mario	
2026	The Super Mario Galaxy Movie	Mario	

=== Video games ===
Year	Title	Voice	Notes
2005	Batman Begins	Batman	
