= After Midnight (2004 film) =

- Directed by: Davide Ferrario
- Written by: Davide Ferrario
- Starring: Giorgio Pasotti; Francesca Inaudi; Fabio Troiano; Francesca Picozza
- Narrated by: Silvio Orlando
- Cinematography: Dante Cecchin
- Edited by: Claudio Cormio
- Music by: Banda Ionica; Fabio Barovero; Daniele Sepe
- Release dates: 8 February 2004 (Berlinale); 23 April 2004 (Italy)
- Running time: 92 minutes
- Country: Italy
- Language: Italian

After Midnight (Italian: Dopo mezzanotte) is a 2004 Italian romantic comedy film directed by Davide Ferrario. It entered the Forum section at the 54th Berlin International Film Festival, in which Ferrario won the Caligari Film Prize and the Don Quixote Award.

== Cast ==
- Giorgio Pasotti as Martino
- Francesca Inaudi as Amanda
- Fabio Troiano as The Angel of Falchera
- Francesca Picozza as Barbara
- Silvio Orlando as Narrator
- Pietro Eandi as Martino's Grandfather
- Andrea Romero as Fast Food Owner
- Giampiero Perone as Bruno the Night Watchman
- Francesco D'Alessio as Member of the Falchera's Gang
- Gianni Talia as Member of the Falchera's Gang
- Andrea Moretti as Member of the Falchera's Gang
- Gianna Cavalla as The Car Receiver
- Claudio Pagano as The Car Receiver's Bodyguard

== See also ==
- List of Italian films of 2004
