= Golden Door (film) =

2006 film by Emanuele Crialese

- Italian theatrical release poster
- Italian: Nuovomondo
- Directed by: Emanuele Crialese
- Written by: Emanuele Crialese
- Produced by: Fabrizio Mosca; Alexandre Mallet-Guy
- Starring: Charlotte Gainsbourg; Vincenzo Amato; Vincent Schiavelli; Aurora Quattrocchi; Francesco Casisa; Filippo Pucillo
- Cinematography: Agnès Godard
- Edited by: Maryline Monthieux
- Music by: Antonio Castrignanó
- Production companies: Titti Film; Memento Films; Respiro; Rai Cinema
- Distributed by: 01 Distribution (Italy); Memento Films (France)
- Release dates: 8 September 2006 (Venice); 22 September 2006 (Italy); 21 March 2007 (France)
- Running time: 120 minutes
- Countries: Italy; France
- Language: Italian

Golden Door (Italian: Nuovomondo, lit. 'New World') is a 2006 historical romantic drama film written and directed by Emanuele Crialese, based on a family's migration from Italy to New York City at the beginning of the 20th century. The film opens on location in Sicily and concludes in the United States. (The Ellis Island sequences were shot at a studio in Rome and Buenos Aires.) Vincent Schiavelli, whose character was originally planned to play a major part, died during the filming, forcing his role to become a supporting character.

The film premiered at the 63rd Venice International Film Festival on 8 September 2006 to critical praise and received seven nominations (with six wins) at the festival. Many praised the director's focus on sound and visual composition. Others focused on the lack of typical iconography of the time (such as the Statue of Liberty). Martin Scorsese was involved in the marketing, and introduced the film at the 2007 Tribeca Film Festival. Although selected as the Italian entry for the Best Foreign Language Film at the 79th Academy Awards, it was not nominated.

== Plot ==
The first major segment of the film introduces the poor Mancuso family (headed by the widowed Salvatore), from Sicily, Italy, at the turn of the 20th century residing in a rural mountainous region, who decide to emigrate to the United States after receiving a sign from God in the form of American postcards depicting giant produce and chickens. Their dreams about the land of opportunity where giant vegetables are grown, people swim in milk, and coins fall from the sky propel their decision, which gives the viewer insight into the unrealistic expectations that many immigrants held about America. Salvatore takes his family consisting of his two sons as well as his old mother, Fortunata, who is the village folk healer and involved heavily in mysticism. The dramatic scene that opens up the next segment of the film, the boat trip, visually depicts a sea of people being separated, those on the dock and those on the boat metaphorically representing the departure of the old and the new world respectively.

While aboard the ship to America, a red-headed British woman named Lucy, who is traveling alone, stands out as both an attractive and elusive woman, catching the attention of the men for her beauty and the women for her classiness and independence. Salvatore is immediately smitten with this woman throughout the journey. Upon arrival at Ellis Island, Lucy asks Salvatore to marry her purely for administrative reasons, as being a woman she is unable to enter the United States alone. He agrees; he understands that she is not in love with him yet, but expects that will come with time. Their complex relationship highlights the troubling dynamic of the time, as women must still submit to male authority in the new world in order to even hope for the lesser freedom they so desire.

At Ellis Island, the final major segment of the film, the family join the rest of the immigrants on board to undergo extensive and humiliating physical and psychological examinations and questioning. The value of class that separated the immigrants on the ship becomes irrelevant in this final segment, as all of the immigrants' places in the new world are not guaranteed; they are all deemed equal. The ending of the movie reveals a surprising transfer of power between Pietro and Fortunata, as Pietro tells Salvatore that his grandmother wishes to return home. After the tests are conducted, Salvatore is informed that Pietro is about to be sent back for being mute, and Salvatore's mother for insufficient intelligence. The viewers are then left with the dilemma of whether Salvatore chooses to return home with his family or enter the United States.

== Cast ==
- Charlotte Gainsbourg as Lucy
- Vincenzo Amato as Salvatore
- Aurora Quattrocchi as Donna Fortunata
- Francesco Casisa as Angelo
- Filippo Pucillo as Pietro
- Federica De Cola as Rita
- Isabella Ragonese as Rosa
- Vincent Schiavelli as Don Luigi
- Massimo Laguardia as Mangiapane
- Filippo Luna as Don Ercole
- Ernesto Mahieux as Dr. Zampino

== Reception ==
=== Critical response ===
The film received generally favorable reviews from critics. On the review aggregator website Rotten Tomatoes, the film holds an approval rating of 72% based on 86 review, with an average rating of 6.8/10. The website's critics consensus reads, "Slow-moving but ultimately rewarding, Golden Door is a profound drama with scenes of fantastical magical realism, lively humor, and stunning images." Metacritic reported the film had an average score of 74 out of 100, based on 22 reviews, indicating "generally favorable" reviews.

Ann Hornaday of The Washington Post and Wesley Morris of The Boston Globe named it the seventh best film of 2007.

=== Accolades ===
The film won six awards at the 63rd Venice International Film Festival, including two awards for Best Film (the CinemAvvenire and Pasinetti Awards), along with the FEDIC, SIGNIS, Silver Lion, and UNICEF awards. It was also nominated for a Golden Lion award. The film was also nominated for a European Film Award, for the Film of the Year. The film was Italy's submission for the 79th Academy Awards, but was ultimately passed over in final nominations.

== See also ==
- List of submissions to the 79th Academy Awards for Best Foreign Language Film
- List of Italian submissions for the Academy Award for Best Foreign Language Film
