= Salty Air =

- Directed by: Alessandro Angelini
- Written by: Alessandro Angelini; Angelo Carbone
- Starring: Giorgio Pasotti; Giorgio Colangeli
- Cinematography: Arnaldo Catinari
- Music by: Luca Tozzi
- Distributed by: 01 Distribution
- Release date: 2006
- Country: Italy
- Language: Italian

Salty Air (Italian: L'aria salata) is a 2006 Italian drama film written and directed by Alessandro Angelini and starring Giorgio Pasotti, Giorgio Colangeli and Michela Cescon.

The film entered the competition at the 2006 Rome Film Festival, in which Giorgio Colangeli won the award for best actor. For his performance Colangeli also won the David di Donatello for Best Supporting Actor.

== Plot ==
Fabio, who works as an educator in the prison of Rebibbia, finds by chance his father, Luigi Sparta, who was convicted of murder and is now pretending to be epileptic in order to obtain the libertà condizionata. Fabio and Luigi have not been seen since the man abandoned his son, when he was only six years old.

== Cast ==
- Giorgio Pasotti as Fabio
- Giorgio Colangeli as Luigi Sparti
- Michela Cescon as Cristina
- Katy Louise Saunders as Emma
- Sergio Solli as Lodi
- Paolo De Vita as Umberto Sparti
- Paolo Pierobon as Brunetti

== Reception ==
In her review for Variety, film critic Deborah Young called the film "the Italian debut of the year, at least as for critics" and referred to it as a film which "hits fever pitch early and never pauses for a moment of softness or to let the story breathe".
