= One Out of Two =

- Directed by: Eugenio Cappuccio
- Cinematography: Gianfilippo Corticelli
- Music by: Francesco Cerasi
- Release date: 2006
- Language: Italian

One Out of Two (Italian: Uno su due) is a 2006 Italian drama film directed by Eugenio Cappuccio. It entered the competition at the Rome Film Festival, in which Ninetto Davoli was awarded best supporting actor.

== Cast ==
- Fabio Volo: Lorenzo
- Anita Caprioli: Silvia
- Giuseppe Battiston: Paolo
- Paola Rota: Antonia
- Ninetto Davoli: Giovanni
- Tresy Taddei: Tresy
- Agostina Belli: Elena
