= Along the Ridge =

- Theatrical release poster
- Italian: Anche libero va bene
- Directed by: Kim Rossi Stuart
- Written by: Linda Ferri; Federico Starnone; Francesco Giammusso; Kim Rossi Stuart
- Produced by: Carlo Degli Esposti; Giorgio Magliulo; Andrea Costantini
- Starring: Alessandro Morace; Barbora Bobuľová; Kim Rossi Stuart
- Cinematography: Stefano Falivene
- Edited by: Marco Spoletini
- Music by: Banda Osiris
- Production companies: Rai Cinema; Palomar
- Distributed by: 01 Distribution
- Release dates: 3 May 2006 (Milan); 5 May 2006 (Italy)
- Running time: 108 minutes
- Country: Italy
- Language: Italian
- Box office: $1.9 million

Along the Ridge (Italian: Anche libero va bene) is a 2006 Italian drama film directed by Kim Rossi Stuart (in his directorial debut), from a screenplay he co-wrote with Linda Ferri, Federico Starnone and Francesco Giammusso. The film stars Alessandro Morace, Barbora Bobuľová and Rossi Stuart.

At the 2006 Flaiano Prizes, Morace and Rossi Stuart received the awards for Best Male Newcomer and Best Director, respectively.

== Premise ==
11-year-old Tommi and his slightly older sister, Viola, live with their father in Rome. They cope with being a single-parent family until their mother shows up after the latest of many unannounced absences. The film shows their continuing struggle with love, friendship, puberty and life in general.

== Cast ==
- Alessandro Morace as Tommaso "Tommi" Benetti
- Kim Rossi Stuart as Renato Benetti
- Barbora Bobuľová as Stefania Benetti
- Marta Nobili as Viola Benetti
- Pietro De Silva as Domenico
- Roberta Paladini as Letizia
- Sebastiano Tiraboschi as Antonio
- Francesco Benedetto as Vincenzo
- Roberta Lena as Marina
- Stefano Busirivici as Barzelli
- Marco Bardi as Guglielmo
- Greta Alice Gorietti as Elena
- Francesca Strati as Monica
- Federico Santolini as Claudio
- Manuela Occhiuzzi as Teacher
- Ettore Belmondo as Doctor
- Lidia Vitale as Livia
- Tommaso Ragno as Bontempi
- Anna Ferruzzo as Barzelli's Secretary
