= Michela Cescon =

Italian actress (born 1971)

- Born: 13 April 1971 (age 55); Treviso, Italy
- Occupation: Actress

Michela Cescon (Italian pronunciation: [miˈkɛːla tʃeˈskon]; born 13 April 1971) is an Italian actress. Her film credits include Piazza Fontana: The Italian Conspiracy, Salty Air, Viva la libertà, Quando sei nato non puoi più nasconderti, First Love and Tulpa.

== Selected filmography ==
Film
Year	Title	Role	Notes
2004	First Love	Sonia	Italian Golden Globe Award for Best Actress Revelation; Flaiano Prize for Best Actress Revelation; Nominated—David di Donatello for Best Actress; Nominated—Nastro d'Argento for Best Actress
2005	Sacred Heart	Anna Maria	
2005	Once You're Born You Can No Longer Hide	Lucia	Nominated—Italian Golden Globe Award for Best Actress
2006	Don't Make Any Plans for Tonight	Iole	
2007	Salty Air	Cristina	Nominated—David di Donatello for Best Supporting Actress; Nominated—Nastro d'Argento for Best Supporting Actress
2009	Vincere	Rachele Mussolini	
2009	David's Birthday	Shary	
2012	Piazza Fontana: The Italian Conspiracy	Licia Pinelli	David di Donatello for Best Supporting Actress; Nastro d'Argento for Best Supporting Actress; Nominated—Ciak d'oro for Best Supporting Actress
2011	When the Night	Bianca	
2012	Tulpa	Giovanna	
2013	Long Live Freedom	Anna	
2016	Piuma	Carla Pardini	Nominated—Ciak d'oro for Best Supporting Actress; Nominated—David di Donatello for Best Supporting Actress
2017	The Girl in the Fog	Agent Mayer	
2018	Loro	Marinella Brambilla	
2018	Reckless	Castiglioni	
2018	A Woman's Name	Tina Della Rovere	
2019	The Man Without Gravity	Natalia	
2024	The Life Apart	Lucilla's mother	
