= Los Angeles Italia Film Festival =

L.A. film festival

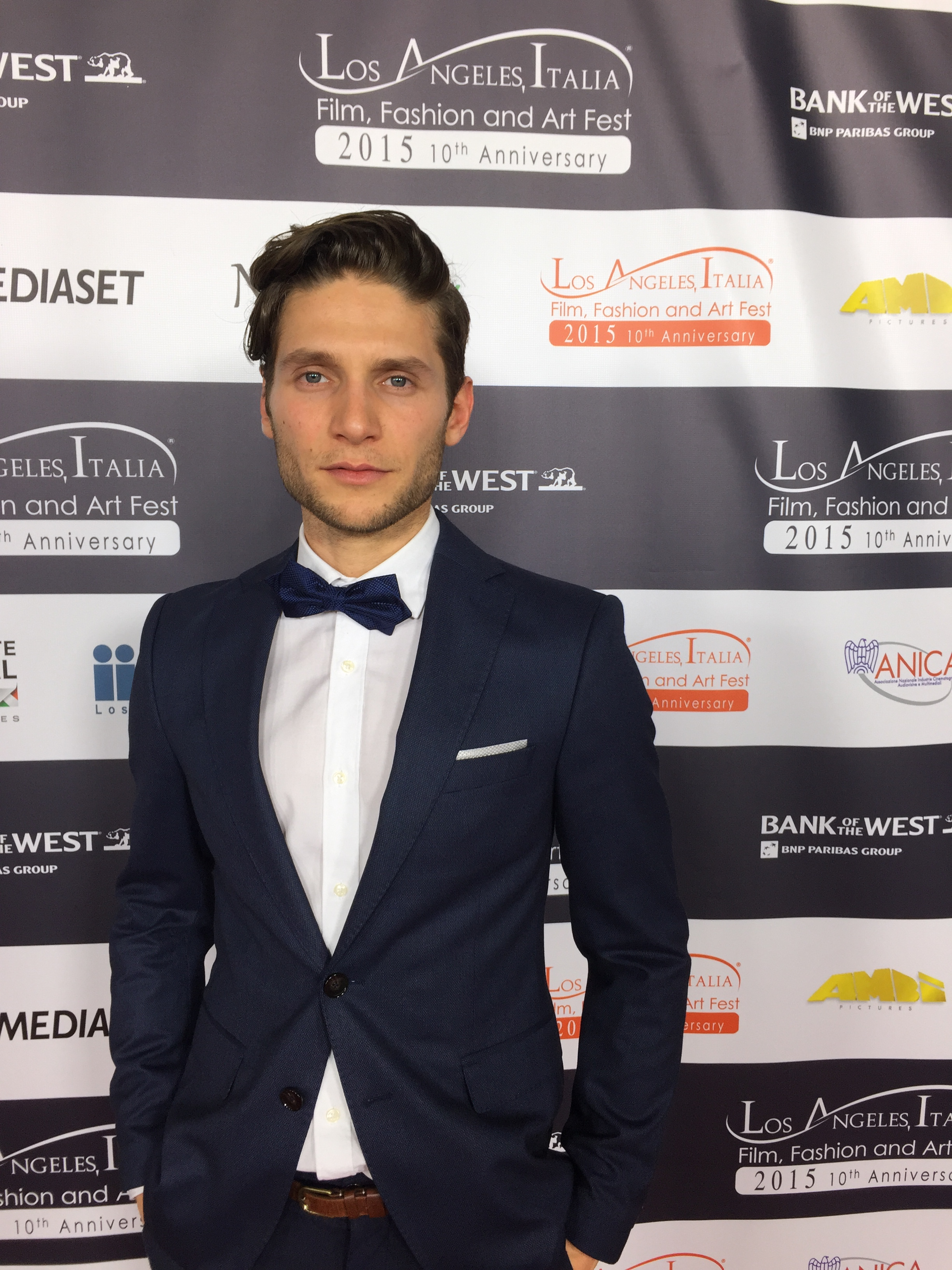
- Italian actor Alessandro Nori at the Los Angeles Italia Film Festival in 2011
- Location: Grauman's Chinese Theatre, Hollywood, California
- Website: losangelesitalia.com

The Los Angeles Italia Film Festival or Los Angeles-Italia Film Fashion and Art Fest is an Italian film festival held in Grauman's Chinese Theatre, Hollywood, California. The festival honors the best of Italian and Italian-American culture every year through premieres, performances and exhibitions, during the pre-Oscar week. All of its events are open to the public free of charge. The festival is sponsored by the Italian Culture Ministry and Intesa San Paolo Bank.
