= Barbora Bobuľová =

Slovak-Italian actress

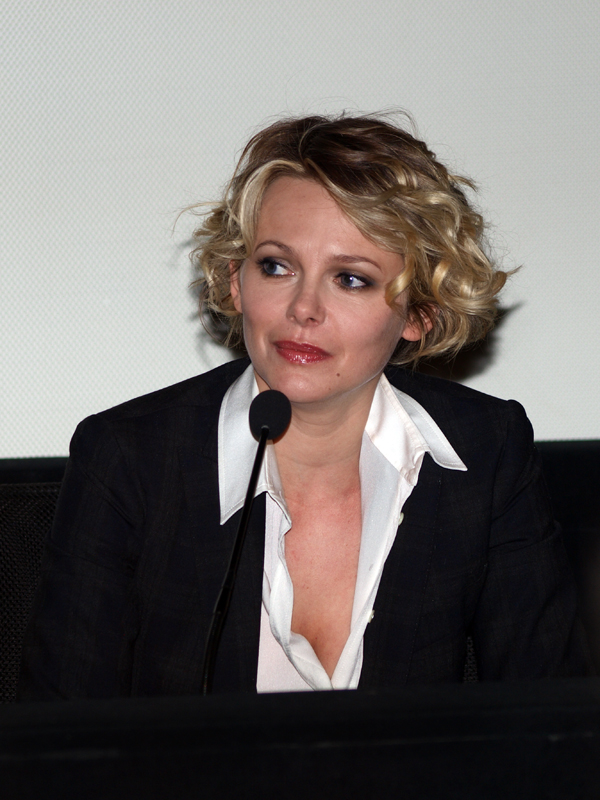
- Bobulová in 2011
- Born: 29 April 1974 (age 52); Martin, Czechoslovakia (present-day Slovakia)
- Citizenship: Slovakia; Italy
- Occupation: Actress
- Years active: 1997–present
- Partner: Alessandro Casale
- Children: 2

Barbora Bobuľová (Slovak pronunciation: [ˈbarbɔra ˈbɔbuʎɔʋaː]; born 29 April 1974) is a Slovak-born Italian actress. She has lived and worked mainly in Italy since 1995.

== Life and work ==
Born in Martin, Bobuľová trained at the Academy of Performing Arts in Bratislava before moving to Italy in 1995. She made her feature film debut in the Italian film The Prince von Homburg, that was selected to represent Italy at the 1997 Cannes Film Festival.

For her work in the 2005 film Sacred Heart, she won Best Actress Awards at the David di Donatello awards, the Ciak d'oro awards and Audience Award for Best Actress at the Flaiano Film Festival in Pescara. In 2006 she received the Nastro Europeo at the Nastro d'Argento (Silver Ribbon) awards from the Italian National Syndicate of Film Journalists.

Bobuľová's additional film credits include The Vanity Serum, Check and Mate, Mirka, Poor Liza, That's It and Green Ashes. American television audiences know Bobuľová from her starring role in the Hallmark Hall of Fame movie In Love and War, where she plays Eric Newby's girlfriend Wanda. Her additional TV credits include the Italian miniseries La Cittadella, La guerra è finita and Crociati. In 2008, Bobuľová co-starred with Shirley MacLaine in Coco Chanel.

In addition to her native Slovak, Bobuľová is fluent in Czech, Italian, and English.

== Personal life ==
Bobuľová has two daughters, Lea (in 2007) and Anita (in 2008) with her partner, assistant director Alessandro Casale.

== Filmography ==
=== Films ===
Key
†	Denotes films that have not yet been released

Year	Title	Role(s)	Notes
1993	Nesmrtelná teta	Princess Pavlina	Feature film debut
1994	Khakestar-e-sabz	Fatima	
1996	Eine kleine Jazzmusik	Zuzana	
1997	The Prince of Homburg	Natalia von Oranien	
1998	Ecco fatto	Margherita	
2000	Mirka	Elena	
2000	Poor Liza	Liza	
2002	La regina degli scacchi	Maria Adele	
2004	The Vanity Serum	Azzurra Rispoli	
2004	The Spectator	Valeria	
2004	Ovunque sei	Emma	
2004	Tartarughe sul dorso	Her	
2004	Paul	Dinah	
2005	Sacred Heart	Irene Ravelli	
2006	Fratelli di sangue	Lella	
2006	Along the Ridge	Stefania Benetti	
2007	Manual of Love 2	Manuela	
2008	Made in Italy	Lilla	
2008	Blood of the Losers	Anna Spada / Costantina	
2010	Le ultime 56 ore	Sara Ferri	
2010	Ti presento un amico	Giulia Lombardi	
2010	Love & Slaps	Lory	
2011	The Immature	Luisa Maimone	
2011	Easy!	Tina	
2012	The Immature: The Trip	Luisa Maimone	
2012	Balancing Act	Elena	
2013	Closed Circuit	Piccola	
2013	A Small Southern Enterprise	Magnolia	
2013	Il mondo fino in fondo	Giulia	
2014	Black Souls	Valeria	
2014	The Dinner	Sofia	
2017	Lasciami per sempre	Viola	
2017	Pure Hearts	Marta	
2017	I'm - Infinita come lo spazio	Susanna	
2017	Diva!	Valentina Cortese	
2017	After the War	Anna Lamberti	
2018	Hotel Gagarin	Valeria	
2018	We'll Be Young and Beautiful	Isabella	
2018	Tutte le mie notti	Veronica	
2020	La regola d'oro	Monica	
2023	Romantic Girls	Dr. Valeria Panizzi	
2023	A Brighter Tomorrow	Vera	
2023	Born for You	Livia Gianfelici	
2024	Sicilian Letters	Lucia Russo	

=== Television ===
Year	Title	Role(s)	Notes
1986	Polovacka na octa	Berta	Television movie
1989	Posledné hry	Cilka	Television movie
1993	Tanec lásky a smrti	Milenka	Television movie
1994	Erotikon	Blanche	Episode: "Blanche"
1996	Infiltrato	Monika	Television movie
2000	Padre Pio: Between Heaven and Earth	Emilia	Television movie
2000	Paul the Apostle	Dina	Television movie
2001	In Love and War	Wanda	Television movie
2001	Crociati	Rachel	Television movie
2002	Maria José - L'ultima regina	Marie-José of Belgium	Television movie
2002	La guerra è finita	Giulia Bonsanti	Miniseries
2003	The Citadel	Christine Barlow	Main role
2008	Coco Chanel	Adult Coco Chanel	Television movie
2011	Come un delfino	Valeria Viti	2 episodes
2012	Mai per amore	Helena	Episode: "Helena&Glory"
2013	Inspector Montalbano	Liliana Lombardi	Episode: "Il gioco degli specchi"
2013–2016	In Treatment	Lea	Main role (seasons 1–2)
2015	Baciato dal sole	Diana Morigi	Main role
2020	Vite in fuga	Agnese Serravalle	Main role
2022	Il re	Gloria	Main role
2022	Studio Battaglia	Anna Battaglia	Lead role
2022	Sopravvissuti	Giulia Morena	Main role
2024	Stucky	Marina	Main role
