= Giorgio Pasotti =

Italian actor

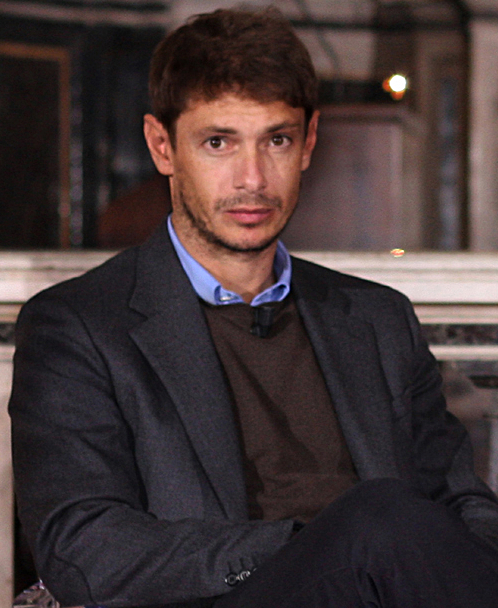
- Pasotti in 2012
- Born: 22 June 1973 (age 53); Bergamo, Lombardy, Italy
- Occupation: Actor
- Years active: 1994–present
- Height: 1.74 m (5 ft 9 in)
- Children: Maria

Giorgio Pasotti (born 22 June 1973) is an Italian actor and former martial arts athlete.

== Life and career ==
Born in Bergamo, Pasotti started performing martial arts at a very young age, practising karate and kobudo and became European and World champion of wushu. He speaks five languages. Between 1994 and 1996, he lived in China, where, while studying at the Beijing Sport University, he made his film debut in American Shaolin and appeared in several other martial arts films.

Back in Italy, Pasotti continued his film career appearing in art films, blockbusters, television series and commercials. In 2005 he was appointed Shooting Star at the Berlin International Film Festival. The same year, he was nominated at David di Donatello for Best Actor for his performance in After Midnight.

== Selected filmography ==
- Treasure Hunt (1994)
- Drunken Master III (1994)
- Ecco fatto (1998)
- Little Teachers (1998)
- Paul the Apostle (2000)
- The Last Kiss (2001)
- After Midnight (2004)
- To Sleep Next To Her (2004)
- The Roses of the Desert (2006)
- Salty Air (2006)
- Baciami ancora (2010)
- Anita Garibaldi (2012)
- The Great Beauty (2013)
- Diary of a Well-to-do Maniac (2013)
- Sapore di te (2014)
- A Fairy-Tale Wedding (2014)
- Tulipani, Love, Honour and a Bicycle (2017)
- Elf Me (2023)
