= Giorgio Colangeli =

Italian stage, television and film actor

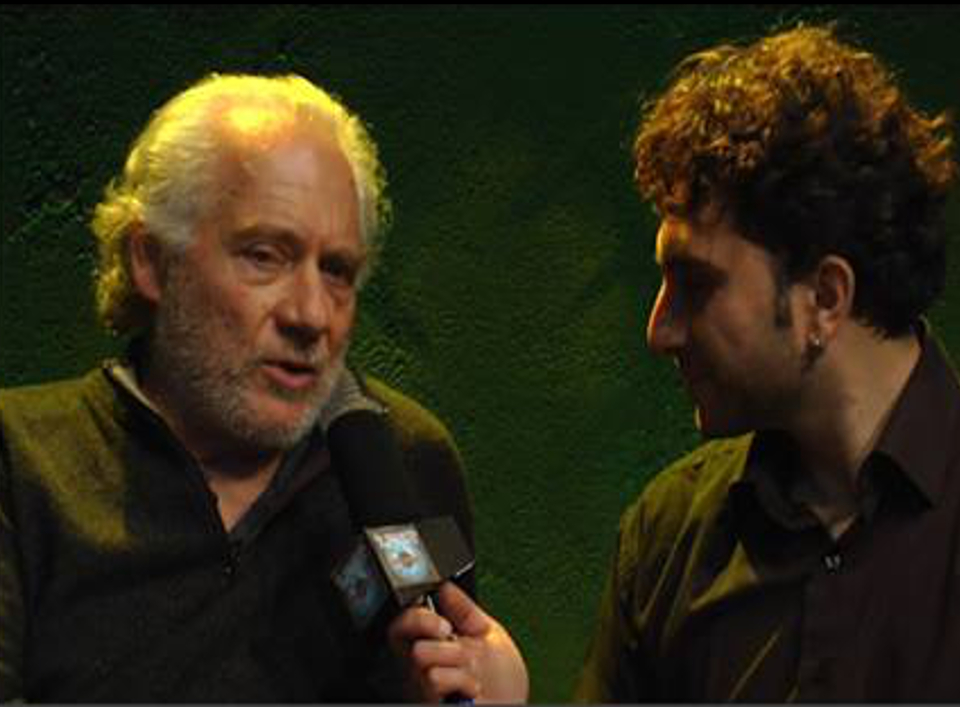
- Colangeli (left) during an interview
- Born: 14 December 1949 (age 76); Rome
- Occupation: actor
- Height: 1.75 m (5 ft 9 in)

Giorgio Colangeli (born 14 December 1949) is an Italian stage, television and film actor.

== Early life ==
Born in Rome, Colangeli graduated in nuclear physics, then he started a stage career.

== Career ==
After several minor roles, Colangeli's breakout role came in 2006 with the tormented Luigi Sparti in Alessandro Angelini's Salty Air; for his performance he won a David di Donatello for best supporting actor and the Best Actor Award at the first Rome Film Festival.

In 2012, for his performance in La decima onda, he won a Nastro d'Argento for best actor in a short film.

== Selected filmography ==
- The Dinner (1998)
- Past Perfect (2003)
- City Limits (2004)
- Salty Air (2006)
- The Family Friend (2006)
- Cardiofitness (2007)
- Miss F (2007)
- St. Giuseppe Moscati: Doctor to the Poor (2007)
- Il Divo (2008)
- We Can Do That (2008)
- Galantuomini (2008)
- Parlami d'amore (2008)
- Little Sea (2009)
- Raise Your Head (2009)
- Palestrina - Prince of Music (2009)
- Il mostro di Firenze (2009)
- The Double Hour (2009)
- La nostra vita (2010)
- The Woman of My Dreams (2010)
- 20 Cigarettes (2010)
- Tatanka (2011)
- Islands (2011)
- Piazza Fontana: The Italian Conspiracy (2012)
- Stay Away from Me (2013)
- A Small Southern Enterprise (2013)
- Three Days Later (2013)
- Banana (2015)
- The Wait (2015)
- Chlorine (2015)
- Ugly Nasty People (2017)
- Twin Flower (2018)
- Citizens of the World (2019)
- The Match (2019)
- Permette? Alberto Sordi (2020)
- Bentornato papà (2021)
- Mindemic (2022)
- There's Still Tomorrow (2023)
- Immaculate (2024)
- I Am the End of the World (2025)
- Make a Wish (2025)
- Love in Separate Beds (2025)
