= Kim Rossi Stuart =

Italian actor and film director (born 1969)

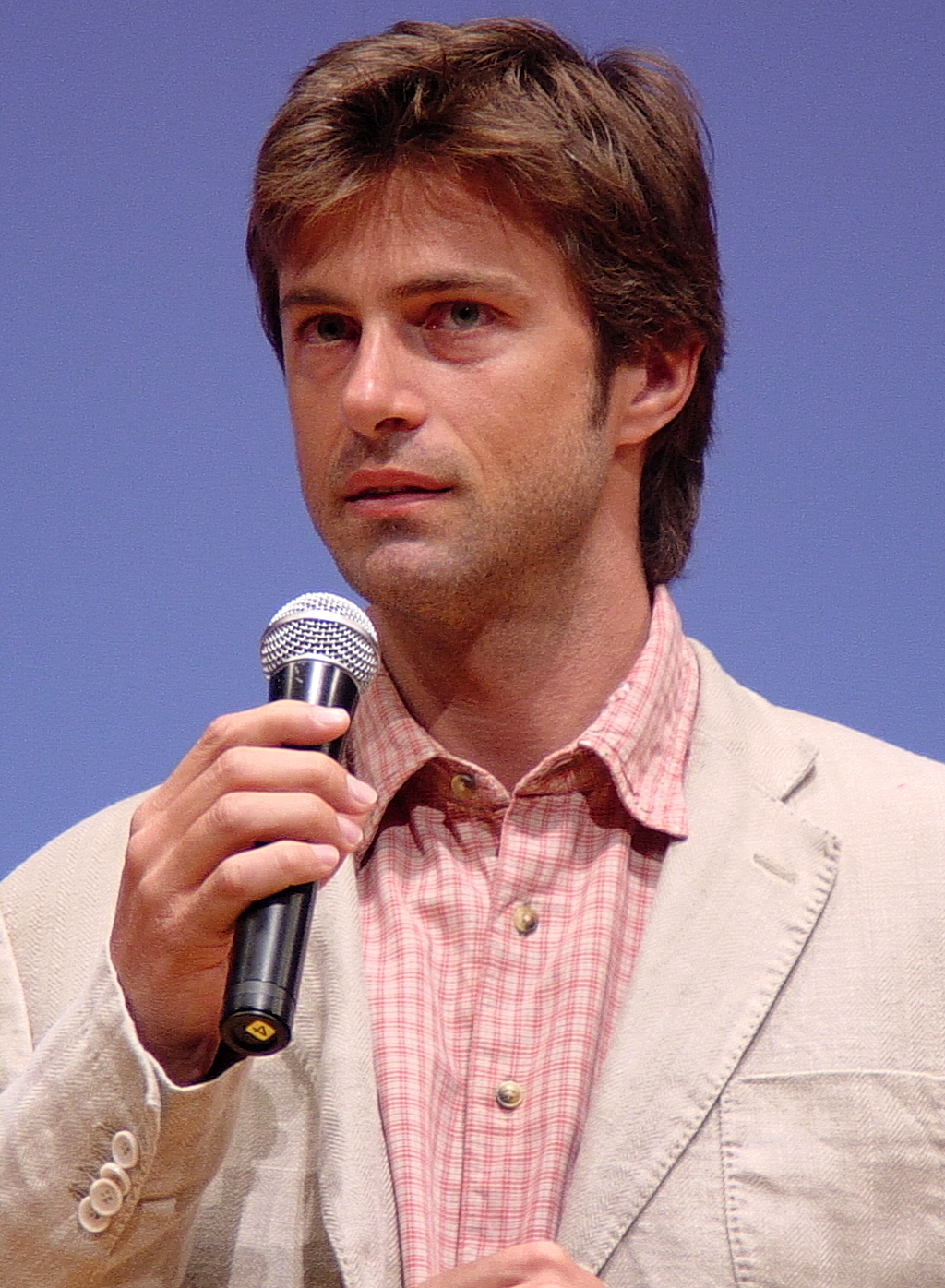
- Rossi Stuart in Tokyo, April 2007
- Born: 31 October 1969 (age 56); Rome, Italy
- Other name: Kim Stuart
- Years active: 1974–present
- Spouse: Ilaria Spada (m. 2019)
- Children: 3
- Parents: Giacomo Rossi Stuart (father); Klara Müller (mother)

Kim Rossi Stuart (born 31 October 1969) is an Italian actor and director.

== Early life and career ==
Rossi Stuart was born on 31 October 1969, in Rome. His father, Giacomo, was an actor of Italian and Scottish descent (his mother was Scottish). Kim's mother, Klara Müller, was a former top model of German and Dutch descent.

He began acting at the age of five. He studied theatre and in 1986 began acting regularly, especially on television productions such as the Fantaghirò series and in cinema with a small role in The Name of the Rose. He reached popularity with Karate Warrior and in the film Poliziotti. After this commercial film, he began to act only in quality films, like Senza pelle, where his role, a man with psychological problems, was appreciated by critics. He then acted with director Antonioni in Al di là delle nuvole and played Julien Sorel in the French television film The Red and the Black (Le Rouge et le Noir) in 1997, based upon the novel of the same name by Stendhal.

Rossi Stuart came back to act in the theatre with Re Lear and with the most important Italian actors, like Turi Ferro in the work Il visitatore. In 2002, he appeared in the film Pinocchio as Lucignolo. In 2004, he played in Le Chiavi di Casa as a young father who attempts to forge a relationship with his teenage, handicapped son when he met him for the first time.

Later, he played Mimmo in the television film Il tunnel della libertà (2004) and he had one of the leading roles (Freddo) in Michele Placido's 2005 film Romanzo Criminale, based on Giancarlo De Cataldo's 2002 novel of the same name.

Rossi Stuart wrote the screenplay, directed and acted in the 2006 film Anche libero va bene. It was followed by Piano, solo (2007), a film based on the life of Italian jazz musician Luca Flores, with Rossi Stuart playing Flores. Another film, Questione Di Cuore, was released in 2009. Rossi Stuart's following film was Angel of Evil, based on the life of 1970s Italian gangster Renato Vallanzasca. It was released in Italy in January 2011 and opened in Germany in February of the same year.

In 2020, he played the main role in Cosa sarà by Francesco Bruni. This role brought Rossi Stuart Nastro d'argento and Globo d'oro for Best Actor.

In 2023, he starred in Everybody Loves Diamonds series, described as an Italian Ocean's Eleven.

== Personal life ==
Rossi Stuart comes from a family of actors; his father, Giacomo and his sister Valentina are both actors, the latter with credits as a stunt performer as well. He was named after the Rudyard Kipling novel Kim. He left his parents' home at age 14 and also left school to begin his career as an actor. Rossi Stuart was engaged to actress Veronica Logan. He speaks English, French and Italian, is an accomplished swimmer and also plays the trumpet. In 2005, Rossi Stuart suffered a severe road accident with multiple fractures and injuries.

In the September 2010 Italian issue of Vanity Fair, Kim spoke about his latest film and personal life, confirming that he is single and expressed the wish to become a father.

He has a son, born on 26 November 2011 by his girlfriend Ilaria Spada. The couple married on 2 March 2019.

== Filmography ==
=== Film ===
Year	Title	Role	Notes
1974	The Murri Affair		
1986	The Name of the Rose	Novitiate	
1987	Karate Warrior	Anthony Scott	
1987	Il mistero del panino assassino		Direct-to-video
1988	Karate Warrior 2	Anthony Scott	
1988	Domino	Eugene	
1989	The Sleazy Uncle	Andrea	
1989	Obbligo di giocare – Zugzwang	Marco	
1991	18 anni tra una settimana	Paolo	
1992	In camera mia	Prince Fjodor	
1992	Un'altra vita	Luciano	
1994	No Skin	Saverio	
1995	Policemen	Andrea	
1995	Heartless	Claudio Scalise	
1995	Beyond the Clouds	Silvano	
1998	The Garden of Eden	Jeoshua	
1998	The Ballad of the Windshield Washers	Rafal	
2002	Pinocchio	Lucignolo	
2004	The Keys to the House	Gianni	
2005	Romanzo Criminale	Il Freddo	
2006	Along the Ridge	Renato Benetti	Also director and co-writer
2007	Piano, solo	Luca Flores	
2009	A Question of the Heart	Angelo	
2010	Angel of Evil	Renato Vallanzasca	
2013	Those Happy Years	Guido	
2014	L'Ex de ma vie	Nino	
2015	Wondrous Boccaccio	Calandrino	
2016	Tommaso	Tommaso	Also director and co-writer
2020	The Best Years	Paolo	
2020	Everything's Gonna Be Alright	Bruno Salvati	

=== Television ===
Year	Title	Role	Notes
1984	I ragazzi della valle misteriosa	Pietro	Miniseries; 10 episodes
1987	Garibaldi	Menotti Garibaldi	Miniseries; 4 episodes
1989	Il ricatto	Luca Fedeli	Miniseries; 5 episodes
1989	Valentina	Bruno	3 episodes
1990	Senza scampo	Adriano	Miniseries; 2 episodes
1990	Mademoiselle Ardel	Alessandro di Falco	Television film
1991	Fantaghirò	Romualdo	Television film
1992	Dalla notte all'alba	Matteo	Miniseries; 2 episodes
1992	Un posto freddo in fondo al cuore	Luca Savio	Television film
1992	Il cielo non cade mai	Nicola Brentano	Miniseries; 3 episodes
1992	Fantaghirò 2	Romualdo	Television film
1993	Dov'eri quella notte	Tupac	Television film
1993	Fantaghirò 3	Romualdo	Television film
1995	La famiglia Ricordi	Vincenzo Bellini	Miniseries; 4 episodes
1997	The Red and the Black	Julien Sorel	Television film
2001	Uno bianca	Inspector Valerio Maldesi	Miniseries; 2 episodes
2004	Il tunnel della libertà	Domenico "Mimmo" Sesta	Miniseries; 2 episodes
2017	Maltese – Il romanzo del Commissario	Commissioner Dario Maltese	Miniseries; 4 episodes
2025	The Leopard	Don Fabrizio Corbera	Miniseries; 6 episodes
