= List of Italian films of 2002 =

A list of films produced in Italy in 2002 (see 2002 in film):

Title	Director	Cast	Genre	Notes
2002
Amnèsia	Gabriele Salvatores	Diego Abatantuono, Sergio Rubini, Martina Stella	Comedy-drama	
Un amore perfetto	Valerio Andrei	Cesare Cremonini, Martina Stella	romantic comedy	
Angela	Roberta Torre	Donatella Finocchiaro, Andrea Di Stefano	Drama	
The Bankers of God: The Calvi Affair	Giuseppe Ferrara	Omero Antonutti, Giancarlo Giannini, Alessandro Gassman, Rutger Hauer	Drama	
The Best Day of My Life (Il Più bel giorno della mia vita)	Cristina Comencini	Virna Lisi, Luigi Lo Cascio, Margherita Buy, Sandra Ceccarelli, Jean-Hugues Anglade	Drama	Gay interest. 2 Nastro d'Argento
Bimba - È clonata una stella	Sabina Guzzanti	Sabina Guzzanti, Francesco Paolantoni	Comedy	
Callas Forever	Franco Zeffirelli	Fanny Ardant, Jeremy Irons, Joan Plowright	biographical	
Carlo Giuliani, Boy	Francesca Comencini	-	Documentary	Screened at the 2002 Cannes Film Festival
Casomai	Alessandro D'Alatri	Fabio Volo, Stefania Rocca	romantic comedy	
Ciao America	Frank Ciota	Maurizio Nichetti, Violante Placido, Giancarlo Giannini, Paul Sorvino	comedy-drama	
The Council of Egypt	Emidio Greco	Silvio Orlando, Renato Carpentieri	drama	
Dracula	Roger Young	Patrick Bergin, Giancarlo Giannini, Stefania Rocca	Horror	
El Alamein	Enzo Monteleone	Paolo Briguglia, Pierfrancesco Favino, Luciano Scarpa, Emilio Solfrizzi, Giuseppe Cederna, Roberto Citran, Silvio Orlando	War	3 David di Donatello
The Embalmer (L'imbalsamatore)	Matteo Garrone	Ernesto Mahieux, Valerio Foglia Manzillo, Elisabetta Rocchetti	Drama	2 David di Donatello. 2 Nastro d'Argento. Gay interest
Febbre da cavallo - La mandrakata	Carlo Vanzina	Gigi Proietti, Enrico Montesano, Carlo Buccirosso, Nancy Brilli	comedy	
I Am Emma	Francesco Falaschi	Cecilia Dazzi, Marco Giallini, Pierfrancesco Favino	comedy	
I Love You Eugenio	Francisco José Fernandez	Giancarlo Giannini, Giuliana De Sio	drama	
A Journey Called Love	Michele Placido	Laura Morante, Stefano Accorsi, Alessandro Haber	romance	
Maximum Velocity (V-Max) (Velocità massima)	Daniele Vicari	Valerio Mastandrea, Cristiano Morroni, Ennio Girolami	Drama	1 David di Donatello. 2 Nastro d'Argento
My Mother's Smile (L'ora di religione)	Marco Bellocchio	Sergio Castellitto, Jacqueline Lustig, Chiara Conti, Piera Degli Esposti, Gigio Alberti	Drama	4 Nastro d'Argento, entered at Cannes
My Name Is Tanino	Paolo Virzì	Corrado Fortuna, Rachel McAdams	comedy-drama	
Natale sul Nilo	Neri Parenti	Christian De Sica, Massimo Boldi	comedy	
Nati stanchi	Dominick Tambasco	Ficarra e Picone, Luigi Maria Burruano	comedy	
Pinocchio	Roberto Benigni	Roberto Benigni, Nicoletta Braschi, Kim Rossi Stuart	fantasy comedy	
The Power of the Past	Piergiorgio Gay	Sergio Rubini, Bruno Ganz, Valeria Moriconi	drama	
Respiro	Emanuele Crialese	Valeria Golino, Vincenzo Amato	Drama	
Ripley's Game	Liliana Cavani	John Malkovich, Dougray Scott, Ray Winstone, Lena Headey	thriller	Italian-British-American co-production
Soul Mate	Sergio Rubini	Valentina Cervi, Violante Placido	fantasy comedy	
The Soul Keeper	Roberto Faenza	Emilia Fox, Iain Glen, Craig Ferguson	romance-drama	Italian-French-British co-production
Valentín	Alejandro Agresti	Rodrigo Noya, Carmen Maura	drama	Argentine-French-Italian co-production
Winter	Nina Di Majo	Valeria Bruni Tedeschi, Fabrizio Gifuni, Valeria Golino	drama	

== See also ==
- 2002 in Italy
- 2002 in Italian television
