= Valerio Mastandrea =

Italian actor (born 1972)

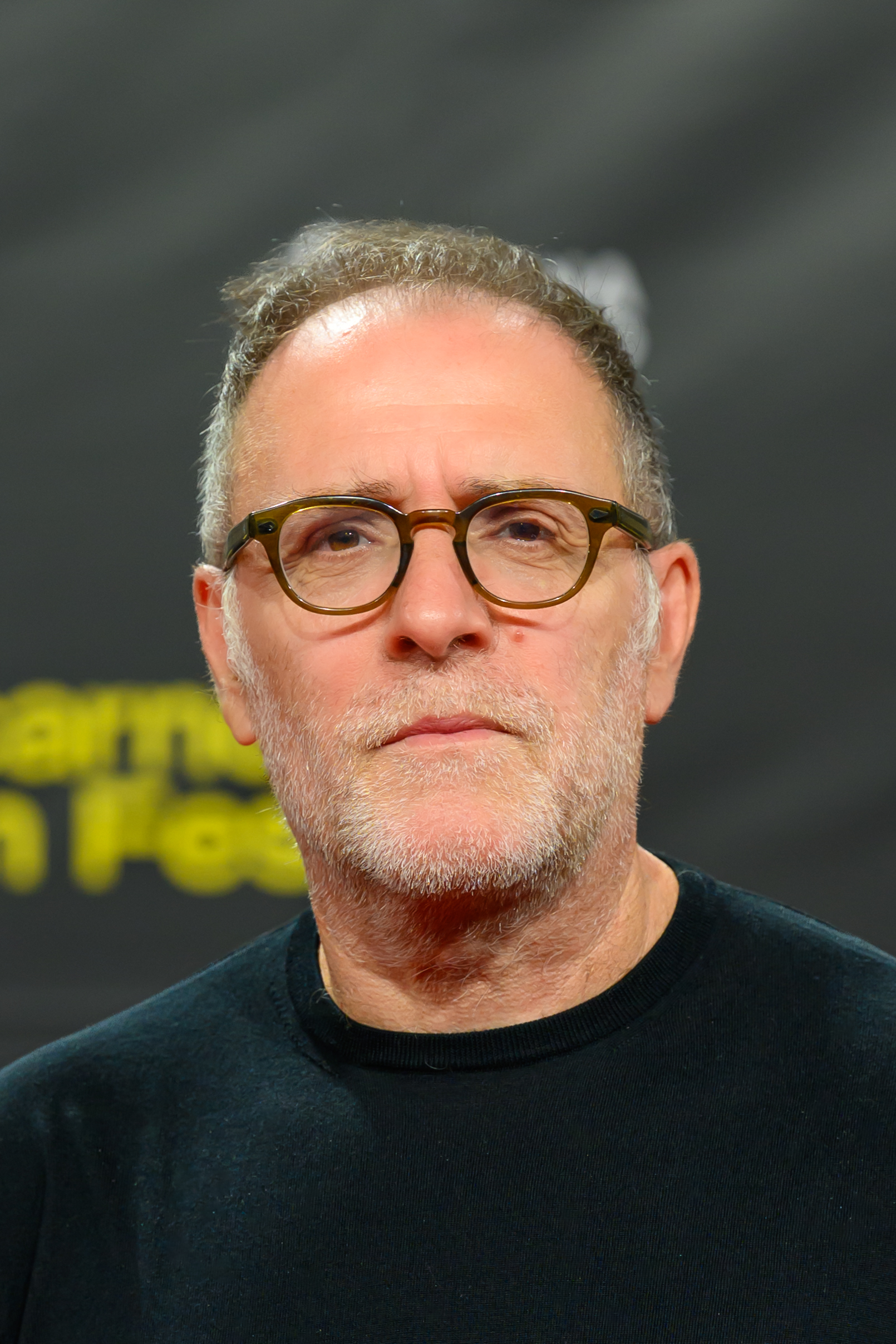
- Mastandrea in 2026
- Born: Valerio Marco Massimo Maria Mastandrea; 14 February 1972 (age 54); Rome, Italy
- Occupations: Actor; filmmaker; producer
- Years active: 1994–present

Valerio Mastandrea (born 14 February 1972) is an Italian actor, filmmaker, and film producer.

== Life and career ==
He was born in Rome. While being a student of philosophy, in the early 1990s Mastandrea enjoyed some success thanks to the semi-regular participation in the Canale 5 late night talk show Maurizio Costanzo Show.

After some occasional participation in stage plays and films, he had his breakout with the role of Tarcisio in the 1995 crime film Palermo – Milan One Way by Claudio Fragasso. In 1997 he got his first leading role in the sleeper box office hit We All Fall Down.

== Awards and nominations ==
Award	Year	Category	Nominated work	Result	Ref.
59th Venice International Film Festival	2002	Pasinetti Award for Best Actor	Maximum Velocity	Won	
Bari International Film Festival	2018	Gabriele Ferzetti Award for Best Actor	Tito and the Aliens	Won	
Ciak d'Oro	2008	Best Actor	Don't Think About It	Won	
Ciak d'Oro	2013	Best Supporting Actor	Long Live Freedom	Won	
Ciak d'Oro	2016	Best Producer	Don't Be Bad	Won	
Ciak d'Oro	2023	Best Actor	There's Still Tomorrow	Nominated	
Cinematografo Award	2025	Best Actor	Five Seconds	Won	
David di Donatello	2007	Best Supporting Actor	Napoleon and Me	Nominated	
David di Donatello	2009	Best Actor	Don't Think About It	Nominated	
David di Donatello	2010	Best Actor	The First Beautiful Thing	Won	
David di Donatello	2012	Best Actor	Piazza Fontana: The Italian Conspiracy	Nominated	
David di Donatello	2013	Best Actor	Balancing Act	Won	
David di Donatello	2013	Best Supporting Actor	Long Live Freedom	Won	
David di Donatello	2016	Best Actor	Perfect Strangers	Nominated	
David di Donatello	2016	Best Producer	Don't Be Bad	Nominated	
David di Donatello	2017	Best Actor	Sweet Dreams	Nominated	
David di Donatello	2017	Best Supporting Actor	Fiore	Won	
David di Donatello	2018	Best Actor	The Place	Nominated	
David di Donatello	2019	Best New Director	Ride	Nominated	
David di Donatello	2019	Best Adapted Screenplay	La profezia dell'armadillo	Nominated	
David di Donatello	2019	Best Supporting Actor	Euphoria	Nominated	
David di Donatello	2021	Best Actor	Figli	Nominated	
David di Donatello	2022	Best Supporting Actor	Diabolik	Nominated	
David di Donatello	2024	Best Actor	There's Still Tomorrow	Nominated	
David di Donatello	2026	Best Actor	Five Seconds	Nominated	
Globo d'oro	2007	Best Actor	Night Bus	Nominated	
Globo d'oro	2010	Best Actor	The First Beautiful Thing	Nominated	
Globo d'oro	2012	Best Actor	Piazza Fontana: The Italian Conspiracy	Nominated	
Globo d'oro	2013	Best Actor	Balancing Act	Nominated	
Globo d'oro	2026	Best Actor	Five Seconds	Nominated	
La pellicola d'oro	2015	Special Award	Himself	Won	
La pellicola d'oro	2021	Best Actor	Figli	Nominated	
La pellicola d'oro	2024	Best Actor	There's Still Tomorrow	Won	
La pellicola d'oro	2026	Best Actor	Feeling Better	Nominated	
Locarno Film Festival	1997	Bronze Leopard Award	We All Fall Down	Won	
Moscow International Film Festival	2019	Silver Saint George for Best Director	Ride	Won	
Nastro d'Argento	1998	Best Actor	We All Fall Down	Nominated	
Nastro d'Argento	1999	Best Actor	The Scent of the Night	Nominated	
Nastro d'Argento	2003	Best Actor	Maximum Velocity	Nominated	
Nastro d'Argento	2008	Best Actor	Don't Think About It	Nominated	
Nastro d'Argento	2010	Best Actor	The First Beautiful Thing	Nominated	
Nastro d'Argento	2013	Best Actor	Balancing Act	Nominated	
Nastro d'Argento	2016	Special Nastro d'Argento	Perfect Strangers	Won	
Nastro d'Argento	2017	Best Supporting Actor	Fiore	Nominated	
Nastro d'Argento	2018	Best Actor	The Place	Nominated	
Nastro d'Argento	2019	Best Actor	Domani è un altro giorno	Nominated	
Nastro d'Argento	2019	Best New Director	Ride	Won	
Nastro d'Argento	2020	Best Comedy Actor	Figli	Won	
Nastro d'Argento	2025	Best Story	Feeling Better	Won	
Nastro d'Argento	2026	Best Actor	Five Seconds	Won	

== Filmography ==
=== Film ===
Key
†	Denotes films that have not yet been released

Title	Year	Role	Director	Notes
Ladri di cinema	1994	Valerio	Piero Natoli	
Heartless	1995	Agent Inzerillo	Umberto Marino	
Palermo – Milan One Way	1995	Tarcisio Proietti	Claudio Fragasso	
L'anno prossimo vado a letto alle dieci	1995	Mirko	Angelo Orlando	
Bruno aspetta in macchina	1996	Nanni	Duccio Camerini	
Growing Artichokes in Mimongo	1996	Enzo	Fulvio Ottaviano	
A Cold, Cold Winter	1996	Roby	Roberto Cimpanelli	
La classe non è acqua	1997	Mauro Rizzuti	Cecilia Calvi	
We All Fall Down	1997	Walter Verra	Davide Ferrario	
Stressati	1997	Bertarelli	Mauro Cappelloni	Uncredited
Physical Jerks	1997	Massimo Migliarini	Stefano Reali	
Viola Kisses Everybody	1998	Samuele	Giovanni Veronesi	
Abbiamo solo fatto l'amore	1998	Leo	Fulvio Ottaviano	
The Scent of the Night	1998	Remo Guerra	Claudio Caligari	
Barbara	1998	Aldo	Angelo Orlando	
La Carbonara	2000	Fabrizio	Luigi Magni	
Zora the Vampire	2000	Nicola Speranza	Manetti Bros.	
Tomorrow	2001	Giovanni Moccia	Francesca Archibugi	
Empty Eyes	2001	Agent Rinaldi	Andrea Porporati	
The Nest	2002	Giovanni	Florent-Emilio Siri	
Ultimo stadio	2002	Marco De Cesari	Ivano De Matteo	
Maximum Velocity	2002	Stefano	Daniele Vicari	
People of Rome	2003	Guy on Bus	Ettore Scola	
The Vanity Serum	2004	Franco Berardi	Alex Infascelli	
Working Slowly (Radio Alice)	2004	Lt. Lippolis	Guido Chiesa	
Sorry, You Can't Get Through!	2005	Piero (Extrovert)	Paolo Genovese, Luca Miniero	
L'orizzonte degli eventi	2005	Max Flamini	Daniele Vicari	
Amatemi	2005	Andrea	Renato De Maria	
Piano 17	2005	Street Vendor	Manetti Bros.	Cameo appearance
The Caiman	2006	Captain Cesari	Nanni Moretti	
AD Project	2006	MIB 1	Eros Puglielli	Direct-to-video
Napoleon and Me	2006	Ferrante Papucci	Paolo Virzì	
Last Minute Marocco	2007	Sergio	Francesco Falaschi	
Night Bus	2007	Francesco Renzi	Davide Marengo	
Don't Think About It	2007	Stefano Nardini	Gianni Zanasi	
Your Whole Life Ahead of You	2008	Giorgio Conforti	Paolo Virzì	
Basette	2008	Antonio	Gabriele Mainetti	Short film
Chi nasce tondo…	2008	Mario	Alessandro Valori	Also co-writer
A Perfect Day	2008	Antonio Buonocore	Ferzan Özpetek	
Giulia Doesn't Date at Night	2009	Guido Montani	Giuseppe Piccioni	
Good Morning Aman	2009	Teodoro	Claudio Noce	Also co-producer
Nine	2009	De Rossi	Rob Marshall	
The First Beautiful Thing	2010	Adult Bruno Michelucci	Paolo Virzì	
All at Sea	2011	Fantino	Matteo Cerami	
Escort in Love	2011	Narrator	Massimiliano Bruno	Voice role
Things from Another World	2011	Ariele Verderame	Francesco Patierno	
Ruggine	2011	Adult Carmine	Daniele Gaglianone	
Tormenti	2011	Mario (voice)	Filiberto Scarpelli	Voice role
Piazza Fontana: The Italian Conspiracy	2012	Luigi Calabresi	Marco Tullio Giordana	
The Landlords	2012	Cosimo	Edoardo Gabriellini	Also co-writer
Balancing Act	2012	Giulio	Ivano De Matteo	
Garibaldi's Lovers	2012	Leo	Silvio Soldini	
Long Live Freedom	2013	Andrea Bottini	Roberto Andò	
La mia classe	2013	Professor	Daniele Gaglianone	Also co-producer
The Chair of Happiness	2013	Dino	Carlo Mazzacurati	
Caserta Palace Dream	2014	Charles III	James McTeigue	Short film
Pasolini	2014	Nico Naldini	Abel Ferrara	
The Face of an Angel	2014	Edoardo	Michael Winterbottom	
Ogni maledetto Natale	2014	Tiziano / Baldovino	Giacomo Ciarrapico, Mattia Torre	
The Complexity of Happiness	2015	Enrico Giusti	Gianni Zanasi	
Don't Be Bad	2015	None	Claudio Caligari	Producer
Perfect Strangers	2016	Lele	Paolo Genovese	
Sweet Dreams	2016	Massimo	Marco Bellocchio	
Fiore	2016	Ascanio	Claudio Giovannesi	Also co-producer
The Place	2017	Mysterious Man	Paolo Genovese	
Tito and the Aliens	2018	Professor Biondi	Paola Randi	
Euphoria	2018	Ettore Barbieri	Valeria Golino	
La profezia dell'armadillo	2018	None	Emanuele Scaringi	Co-writer
The King's Musketeers	2018	Porthos	Giovanni Veronesi	
Ride	2018	None	Valerio Mastandrea	Directional debut; also writer and producer
Domani è un altro giorno	2019	Tommaso	Simone Spada	
Figli	2020	Nicola	Giuseppe Bonito	
The Players	2020	Paolo	Stefano Mordini	
The King's Musketeers: All for One, One for All	2020	Porthos	Giovanni Veronesi	
La terra dei figli	2021	Boia	Claudio Cupellini	
Zeros and Ones	2021	Luciano	Abel Ferrara	
Dog Years	2021	Stella's father	Fabio Mollo	
Diabolik	2021	Inspector Ginko	Manetti Bros.	
Il pataffio	2022	Migone	Francesco Lagi	
Dry	2022	Loris	Paolo Virzì	
Diabolik: Ginko Attacks!	2022	Inspector Ginko	Manetti Bros.	
The First Day of My Life	2023	Napoleone	Paolo Genovese	
There's Still Tomorrow	2023	Ivano Santucci	Paola Cortellesi	
Diabolik: Who Are You?	2023	Inspector Ginko	Manetti Bros.	
Adagio	2023	Polniuman	Stefano Sollima	
True Blue	2024	Franco	Filippo Barbagallo	
Feeling Better	2025	Him	Valerio Mastandrea	Also director, writer and producer
Five Seconds	2025	Adriano Sereni	Paolo Virzì	
No Pain	2026	Michele	Gianni Amelio	
The City of the Living	2026	Giuseppe Varani	Edoardo Gabbriellini	
È andata così	2026	Christophe	Gianni Zanasi	
Armony †	2026	Armony	Dario Albertini	Post-production
Il sopravvissuto †	TBA	Andrea Marescalchi	Claudio Cupellini	Post-production
Gli ultimi giorni di vita di Leonardo Ravelli, figlio unico †	TBA	TBA	Stefano Grasso	In production

=== Television ===
Title	Year	Role	Network	Notes
I ragazzi del muretto	1996	Marcello	Rai 2	Episode: "Sangue e amore"
Da cosa nasce cosa	1997	Mickey	Italia 1	Television movie
Gli insoliti ignoti	2003	Cosimo Spadoni	Canale 5	Television movie
Cefalonia	2005	Moreno	Rai 1	Two-parts television movie
Buttafuori	2006	Cianca	Rai 3	Lead role; 8 episodes
Boris	2007	Castings Actor	Fox	Episode: "Una giornata particolare"
Non pensarci – La serie	2009	Stefano Nardini	Fox	Main role; 12 episodes
Tutti pazzi per amore	2010	Himself	Rai 1	Episode: "Almeno tu nell'universo"
La linea verticale	2018	Luigi	Rai 3	Lead role; 8 episodes
Tear Along the Dotted Line	2021	Armadillo (voice)	Netflix	Main role; 6 episodes
This World Can't Tear Me Down	2023	Armadillo (voice)	Netflix	Main role; 6 episodes
La Storia	2024	Remo	Rai 1	Main role; 8 episodes
Antonia	2024	Manfredi	Prime Video	Main role; 6 episodes
My 2 Cents	2026	Armadillo (voice)	Netflix	Main role; 6 episodes
Peccato	2026	Himself	HBO Max	Episode: "The Cheesecake Theory"
