= Boccanera =

Boccanera is a surname. Notable people with the surname include:

- Fabio Boccanera (born 1964), Italian voice actor, brother of Laura
- Giacinto Boccanera (1666–1746), Italian painter
- Laura Boccanera (born 1961), Italian voice actress, sister of Fabio

== See also ==
- Boccanegra
