= Nastro d'Argento for Best Supporting Actor =

- Type: Film award
- Awarded for: Supporting actor film performance
- Country: Italy
- Established: 1940s
- First award: 1940s

The Nastro d'Argento (Silver Ribbon) is a film award assigned each year, since 1946, by Sindacato Nazionale dei Giornalisti Cinematografici Italiani ("Italian National Syndicate of Film Journalists"), the association of Italian film critics.

This is the list of Nastro d'Argento awards for Best Supporting Actor. Romolo Valli, Leopoldo Trieste and Alessandro Haber are the most awarded actors in this category, with 3 awards each.

== 1940s ==
- 1946 – Gino Cervi – His Young Wife
- 1947 – Massimo Serato – The Sun Still Rises
- 1948 – Nando Bruno – Flesh Will Surrender
- 1949 – Saro Urzì – In the Name of the Law

== 1950s ==
- 1950 – not awarded
- 1951 – Umberto Spadaro – Il Brigante Musolino
- 1952 – not awarded
- 1953 – Gabriele Ferzetti – The Wayward Wife
- 1954 – Alberto Sordi – I Vitelloni
- 1955 – Paolo Stoppa – The Gold of Naples
- 1956 – Memmo Carotenuto – The Bigamist
- 1957 – Peppino De Filippo – Toto, Peppino and the Outlaws
- 1958 – Andrea Checchi – Parola di ladro
- 1959 – Nino Vingelli – La sfida

== 1960s ==
- 1960 – Claudio Gora – The Facts of Murder
- 1961 – Enrico Maria Salerno – Long Night in 1943
- 1962 – Salvo Randone – The Assassin
- 1963 – Romolo Valli – A Milanese Story
- 1964 – Folco Lulli – The Organizer
- 1965 – Leopoldo Trieste – Seduced and Abandoned
- 1966 – Ugo Tognazzi – I Knew Her Well
- 1967 – Gastone Moschin – The Birds, the Bees and the Italians
- 1968 – Gabriele Ferzetti – We Still Kill the Old Way
- 1969 – Ettore Mattia – The Black Sheep

== 1970s ==
- 1970
  - Umberto Orsini – The Damned
  - Fanfulla – Fellini Satyricon
- 1971 – Romolo Valli – The Garden of the Finzi-Continis
- 1972 – Salvo Randone – The Working Class Goes to Heaven
- 1973 – Mario Carotenuto – The Scientific Cardplayer
- 1974 – Turi Ferro – Malicious
- 1975 – Aldo Fabrizi – We All Loved Each Other So Much
- 1976 – Ciccio Ingrassia – Todo modo
- 1977 – Romolo Valli – An Average Little Man
- 1978 – Carlo Bagno – In the Name of the Pope King
- 1979 – Vittorio Mezzogiorno – A Dangerous Toy

== 1980s ==
- 1980 – Tomas Milian – La Luna
- 1981 – Massimo Girotti – Passion of Love
- 1982 – Paolo Stoppa – Il Marchese del Grillo
- 1983 – Tino Schirinzi – Sciopèn
- 1984 – Leo Gullotta – Where's Picone?
- 1985 – Leopoldo Trieste – Henry IV
- 1986 – Gastone Moschin – Amici miei – Atto III
- 1987 – Diego Abatantuono – Christmas Present
- 1988 – Enzo Cannavale – 32 dicembre
- 1989 – Fabio Bussotti – Francesco

== 1990s ==
- 1990 – Alessandro Haber – Willy Signori e vengo da lontano
- 1991 – Ennio Fantastichini – Open Doors
- 1992 – Paolo Bonacelli – Johnny Stecchino
- 1993 – Renato Carpentieri – Puerto Escondido
- 1994 – Alessandro Haber – For Love, Only for Love
- 1995 – Marco Messeri – With Closed Eyes
- 1996 – Leopoldo Trieste – The Star Maker
- 1997 – Gianni Cavina – Festival
- 1998 – Giustino Durano – Life Is Beautiful
- 1999 – Antonio Catania, Riccardo Garrone, Vittorio Gassman, Giancarlo Giannini, Adalberto Maria Merli, Eros Pagni, Stefano Antonucci, Giorgio Colangeli, Giuseppe Gandini, Valter Lupo, Paolo Merloni, Carlo Molfese, Sergio Nicolai, Corrado Olmi, Mario Patanè, Pierfrancesco Poggi, Francesco Siciliano, Giorgio Tirabassi, Venantino Venantini, Andrea Cambi – The Dinner

== 2000s ==
- 2000 – Felice Andreasi – Bread and Tulips
- 2001 – Giancarlo Giannini – Hannibal
- 2002 – Leo Gullotta – Vajont
- 2003 – Diego Abatantuono – I'm Not Scared
- 2004 – Arnoldo Foà – Gente di Roma
- 2005 – Raffaele Pisu – The Consequences of Love
- 2006 – Carlo Verdone – Manual of Love
- 2007 – Alessandro Haber – The Unknown Woman and The Roses of the Desert
- 2008 – Alessandro Gassman – Quiet Chaos
- 2009 – Ezio Greggio – Giovanna's Father

== 2010s ==
- 2010
  - Ennio Fantastichini – Loose Cannons
  - Luca Zingaretti – The Youngest Son and La nostra vita
- 2011 – Giuseppe Battiston – La Passione, Unlikely Revolutionaries and Make a Fake
- 2012 – Marco Giallini – A Flat for Three and ACAB – All Cops Are Bastards
- 2013 – Carlo Verdone – The Great Beauty
- 2014: Carlo Buccirosso e Paolo Sassanelli – Song'e Napule
  - Alessandro Haber – The Fifth Wheel
  - Ricky Memphis – The Move of the Penguin
  - Giorgio Pasotti – Sapore di te, Nottetempo e A Fairy-Tale Wedding
  - Filippo Timi – A Castle in Italy
- 2015: Claudio Amendola – The Legendary Giulia and Other Miracles
  - Stefano Fresi – Ogni maledetto Natale, La prima volta (di mia figlia)
  - Adriano Giannini – Without Pity, The Ice Forest
  - Luigi Lo Cascio – The Dinner
  - Francesco Scianna – Latin Lover
- 2016 – Luca Marinelli – They Call Me Jeeg
- 2017 – Alessandro Borghi – Fortunata and I Was a Dreamer
- 2018 – Riccardo Scamarcio – Loro
- 2019
  - Luigi Lo Cascio – The Traitor
  - Fabrizio Ferracane – The Traitor

== 2020s ==
- 2020 – Roberto Benigni - Pinocchio
- 2021 – Massimo Popolizio - Pinocchio
- 2022 – Francesco Di Leva and Tommaso Ragno - Nostalgia
- 2023 – Paolo Pierobon - Kidnapped
- 2024: Elio Germano - Palazzina Laf
- 2025: Francesco Di Leva - Familia

== See also ==
- David di Donatello for Best Supporting Actor
- Cinema of Italy
