= David di Donatello for Best Short Film =

Annual Italian film award

The David di Donatello for Best Short Film (Italian: David di Donatello per il miglior cortometraggio) is a category in the David di Donatello Awards, described as "Italy's answer to the Oscars", presented annually by the Accademia del Cinema Italiano (ACI, Academy of Italian Cinema) to recognize the most outstanding Italian short film released in Italy during the year preceding the ceremony, starting with the 1997 edition.

== Winners and nominees ==
Winners are indicated in bold.

=== 1990s ===
1997

- **Senza parole**, by Antonello De Leo

1998

- **La matta dei fiori**, by Rolando Stefanelli
- Asino chi legge, by Pietro Reggiani
- Spalle al muro, by Nina Di Maio

1999

- **Quasi fratelli**, by Francesco Falaschi
- Fuochino, by Carlotta Cerquetti
- Incantesimo napoletano, by Paolo Genovese and Luca Miniero
- Tanti auguri, by Giulio Manfredonia

=== 2000s ===
2000

- **Monna Lisa**, by Matteo Delbò

2001

- **Gavetta**, by Craig Bell
- Cecchi Gori Cecchi Gori?, by Rocco Papaleo

2002

- **Non dire gatto**, by Giorgio Tirabassi
- La storia chiusa, by Emiliano Corapi
- Un paio di occhiali, by Carlo Damasco

2003

- **Racconto di guerra**, by Mario Amura (ex aequo)
- **Rosso fango**, by Paolo Ameli (ex aequo)
- Radioportogutenberg, by Alessandro Vannucci
- Regalo di Natale, by Daniele De Plano
- Space off, by Tino Franco

2004

- **Sole**, by Michele Carrillo (ex aequo)
- **Zinanà**, by Pippo Mezzapesa (ex aequo)
- Aspettando il treno, by Catherine Mc Gilvray
- Interno 9, by Davide Del Degan
- Un amore possibile, by Amanda Sandrelli

2005

- **Aria**, by Claudio Noce (ex aequo)
- **Lotta libera**, by Stefano Viali (ex aequo)
- Mio fratello Yang, by Gianluca e Massimiliano De Serio
- O' guarracino, by Michelangelo Fornaro
- Un refolo, by Giovanni Arcangeli

2006

- **Un inguaribile amore**, by Giovanni Covini
- Codice a sbarre, by Ivano De Matteo
- Dentro Roma, by Francesco Costabile
- Tanalibera tutti, by Vito Palmieri
- Zakaria, by Gianluca and Massimiliano De Serio

2007

- **Meridionali senza filtro**, by Michele Bia
- Armando, by Massimiliano Camaiti
- La cena di Emmaus, by Josè Corvaglia
- Solo cinque minuti, by Filippo Soldi
- Travaglio, by Lele Biscussi

2008

- **Uova**, by Alessandro Celli
- Adil & Yusuf, by Claudio Noce
- Il bambino di Carla, by Emanuela Rossi
- Ora che Marlene, by Giovanna Nazarena Silvestri
- Tramondo, by Giacomo Agnetti and Davide Bazzali

2009

- **L'arbitro**, by Paolo Zucca
- L'amore è un gioco, by Andrea Rovetta
- Bisesto, by Giovanni Esposito and Francesco Prisco
- Cicatrici, by Eros Achiardi
- La Madonna della frutta, by Paola Randi

=== 2010s ===
2010

- **Passing Time**, by Laura Bispuri
- L'altra metà, by Pippo Mezzapesa
- Buonanotte, by Riccardo Banfi
- Nuvole, mani, by Simone Massi
- Uerra, by Paolo Sassanelli

2011

- **Jody delle giostre**, by Adriano Sforzi
- Io sono qui, by Mario Piredda
- Caffè Capo, by Andrea Zaccariello
- Salvatore, by Bruno Urso and Fabrizio Urso
- Stand By Me, by Giuseppe Marco Albano

2012

- **Dell'ammazzare il maiale**, by Simone Massi
- Ce l'hai un minuto?, by Alessandro Bardani and Luca Di Prospero
- Cusutu n' coddu - Cucito addosso, by Giovanni La Pàrola
- L'estate che non viene, by Pasquale Marino
- Tiger Boy, by Gabriele Mainetti

2013

- **L'esecuzione**, by Enrico Iannaccone
- Ammore, by Paolo Sassanelli
- Cargo, by Carlo Sironi
- Preti, by Astutillo Smeriglia
- Settanta, by Pippo Mezzapesa

2014

- **37°4 S**, by Adriano Valerio
- A passo d'uomo, by Giovanni Aloi
- Bella di notte, by Paolo Zucca
- Lao, by Gabriele Sabatino Nardis
- Non sono nessuno, by Francesco Segrè

2015

- **Thriller**, by Giuseppe Marco Albano
- Due piedi sinistri, by Isabella Salvetti
- L'errore, by Brando De Sica
- Sinuaria, by Roberto Carta
- Le note di Giulia, by Andrea Dalla Costa

2016

- **Bellissima**, by Alessandro Capitani
- A metà luce, by Anna Gigante
- Dove l'acqua con altra acqua si confonde, by Gianluca Mangiasciutti and Massimo Loi
- La ballata dei senzatetto, by Monica Manganelli
- Per Anna, by Andrea Zuliani

2017

- **A casa mia,** by Mario Piredda
- Ego, by Lorenza Indovina
- Mostri, by Adriano Giotti
- Simposio suino in re minore, by Francesco Filippini
- Viola, Franca, by Marta Savina

2018

- **Bismillah,** by Alessandro Grande
- Confino, by Nico Bonomolo
- La Giornata, by Pippo Mezzapesa
- Mezzanotte Zero Zero, by Nicola Conversa
- Pazzo & Bella, by Marcello Di Noto

2019

- **Frontiera**, by Alessandro Di Gregorio
- Il nostro concerto, by Francesco Piras
- Im Bären, by Lilian Sassanelli
- Magic Alps, by Andrea Brusa and Marco Scotuzzi
- Yousef, by Mohamed Hossameldin

=== 2020s ===
2020

- **Inverno**, by Giulio Mastromauro
- Baradar, by Beppe Tufarulo
- Il nostro tempo, by Veronica Spedicati
- Mia sorella, by Saverio Cappiello
- Unfolded, by Cristina Picchi

2021

- **Anne**, by Domenico Croce and Stefano Malchiodi
- The Family Gold, by Emanuele Pisano
- Gas Station, by Olga Torrico
- Il gioco, by Alessandro Haber
- Shero, by Claudio Casale

2022

- **Maestrale**, by Nico Bonomolo
- Diorama, by Camilla Carè
- L'ultimo spegne la luce, by Tommaso Santambrogio
- Notte romana, by Valerio Ferrara
- Pilgrims, by Farnoosh Samadi and Ali Asgari

2023

- **Le variabili dipendenti**, by Lorenzo Tardella
- Albertine where are you?, by Maria Guidone
- Ambasciatori, by Francesco Romano
- Il barbiere complottista, by Valerio Ferrara
- Lo chiamavano Cargo, by Marco Signoretti

2024

- **The Meatseller**, by Lorenzo Tardella
- Asterión, by Francesco Montagner
- Foto di gruppo, by Tommaso Frangini
- In quanto a noi, by Simone Massi
- We Should All Be Futurists, by Angela Norelli

2025

- **Domenica sera** – directed by Matteo Tortone
- La confessione – directed by Nicola Sorcinelli
- The Eggregores' Theory – directed by Andrea Gatopoulos
- Majonezë – directed by Giulia Grandinetti
- La ragazza di Praga – directed by Andree Lucini

2026

- **Everyday in Gaza** – directed by Omar Rammal
- Astronauta – directed by Giorgio Zampà
- Ciao, Varsavia – directed by Diletta Di Nicolantonio
- Festa in famiglia – directed by Nadir Taji
- Tempi supplementari – directed by Matteo Memè
