= Riccardo Rossi =

Riccardo Rossi may refer to:

- Riccardo Rossi (actor, born 1962), Italian actor and television presenter
- Riccardo Rossi (motorcyclist) (born 2002), Italian motorcycle racer
- Riccardo Rossi (politician) (born 1964), Italian politician
- Riccardo Rossi (voice actor) (born 1963), Italian voice actor
