= Mirko Frezza =

Italian actor (born 1973)

- Born: 15 September 1973 (age 51); Rome, Italy
- Occupation: Actor
- Years active: 2011–present

Mirko Frezza (born 15 September 1973) is an Italian actor.

== Life and career ==
Born in 1973 in Rome, and the son of a convicted criminal, he grew up in the outskirts of Tor Cervara, where from a young age he was involved in petty crime, leading to an eight-year prison sentence. After his prison experience, he decided to focus on social activism to revitalize the suburbs through the "Casale Caletto" neighborhood committee, of which he became president. Noticed by actor Alessandro Borghi, with whom he started a friendship, he was introduced to the world of entertainment, initially as a location scout for film shoots in the Roman suburbs, and later as an actor in minor roles.

In 2016, Frezza made his debut as a leading actor in I Was a Dreamer, directed by Michele Vannucci. The film, which tells Frezza's story from his experience in prison to social redemption, was well received by critics.

In 2018, he was part of the cast of Reckless by Marco Ponti, Dogman by Matteo Garrone, and As Needed by Francesco Falaschi. That same year, Frezza took part at the Rai 2 television show Pechino Express, but had to withdraw due to an injury. In 2023, he portrayed the titular character in the drama film Goliath.

Since 2016, he has played the character of Furio Lattanzi in the main cast of the crime series Rocco Schiavone.

== Filmography ==
Film
Year	Title	Role	Notes
2014	What's Your Sign?	Er Puzzone	
2016	I Was a Dreamer	Mirko	Lead role
2016	Fratelli di sangue	Pitbull	
2017	La banda dei tre	Sergej Makarovich	
2018	As Needed	Marione	
2018	Dogman	Pusher	
2018	Reckless	Rambo	
2018	Detective per caso	Ivan	
2019	A mano disarmata	Calogero Costa	
2019	Appena un minuto	Sampei	
2022	Tenebra	Dark ogre	
2023	Goliath	Goliath	Lead role
2023	Before We Say Goodbye	Mauro	
2023	Have You Ever Been Afraid?	Scajaccia	
2024	Mya	Fulvio	
2024	Friends by Chance	Er Caciara	
2024	Il tempo è ancora nostro	Stefano	Lead role

Television
Year	Title	Role	Notes
2016	Dov'è Mario?	Enzo Scarfa	Episode 1
2016–present	Rocco Schiavone	Furio Lattanzi	Main role
2021–present	Un professore	Pantera	
