= Growing Artichokes in Mimongo =

- Directed by: Fulvio Ottaviano
- Written by: Fulvio Ottaviano; Francesco Ranieri Martinotti
- Produced by: Laurentina Guidotti; Francesco Ranieri Martinotti
- Cinematography: Marco Cristiani
- Edited by: Fulvio Ottaviano; Alessandro Corradi
- Music by: Gian Andrea Tabacchi
- Production company: Iterfilm
- Distributed by: Cecchi Gori Distribuzione
- Release date: 1996
- Country: Italy
- Language: Italian
- Budget: $560,000

Growing Artichokes in Mimongo (Italian: Cresceranno i carciofi a Mimongo) is a 1996 Italian independent comedy film directed by Fulvio Ottaviano, his debut feature.

For this film Ottaviano won a David di Donatello for best new director.

== Cast ==
- Daniele Liotti: Sergio Baldini
- Francesca Schiavo: Rita
- Valerio Mastandrea: Enzo
- Simona Marchini: Stefania
- Piero Natoli: Paolo Baldini
- Rocco Papaleo: Esaminatore
- Niccolò Ammaniti: Fattorino
