= Giuliano Taviani =

Italian composer (born 1969)

- Born: 1969 (age 55–56); Rome, Italy
- Occupation: Composer

Giuliano Taviani (born 1969) is an Italian composer.

== Life and career ==
Born in Rome, Taviani is the son of the director and screenwriter Vittorio. He started studying jazz, singing, and guitar at the Scuola Popolare di Musica di Testaccio, under Giovanna Marini, and after a brief experience as a guitarist and a vocalist in the band Defaillance he enrolled at the Conservatory of L'Aquila where he graduated in composition.

After composing some incidental music, he debuted as a film score composer in 1999, for Gianni Zanasi's See You. A longtime collaborator of Francesco Munzi, in 2015 he won two David di Donatello for Best Score and Best Song for Munzi's Black Souls.

== Selected filmography ==
- See You (1999)
- Now or Never (2003)
- Saimir (2004)
- The Lark Farm (2007)
- Love, Soccer and Other Catastrophes (2008)
- The Ladies Get Their Say (2009)
- Generation 1000 Euros (2009)
- Oggi sposi (2009)
- The Woman of My Dreams (2010)
- Unlikely Revolutionaries (2010)
- One Day More (2011)
- Escort in Love (2011)
- Ex 2: Still Friends? (2011)
- Viva l'Italia (2012)
- Caesar Must Die (2012)
- Stay Away from Me (2013)
- Black Souls (2014)
- Sapore di te (2014)
- Wondrous Boccaccio (2015)
- Torno indietro e cambio vita (2015)
- Non si ruba a casa dei ladri (2016)
- Caccia al tesoro (2017)
- Natale a cinque stelle (2018)
- Figli (2020)
- A Girl Returned (2021)
- The Man Who Drew God (2022)
- Diamonds (2024)
