= Balancing Act =

- Directed by: Ivano De Matteo
- Starring: Valerio Mastandrea; Barbora Bobuľová
- Cinematography: Vittorio Omodei Zorini
- Release dates: 30 August 2012 (Venice Film Festival); 13 September 2013 (Italy)
- Running time: 107 minutes

Balancing Act (Italian: Gli equilibristi, French: Les equilibristes) is a 2012 Italian-French drama film directed by Ivano De Matteo. It premiered at the 69th Venice International Film Festival, in which Valerio Mastandrea won the Pasinetti Award. For his performance Mastandrea was also awarded David di Donatello for Best Actor.

== Cast ==
- Valerio Mastandrea: Giulio
- Barbora Bobuľová: Elena
- Maurizio Casagrande: Stefano
- Rolando Ravello: Franco
- Rosabell Laurenti Sellers: Camilla
- Grazia Schiavo: Stefania
- Antonio Gerardi: Pietro
- Antonella Attili
