= Feeling Better =

2024 Italian film

- Italian: Nonostante
- Directed by: Valerio Mastandrea
- Written by: Enrico Audenino; Valerio Mastandrea
- Produced by: Viola Prestieri; Valeria Golino; Francesco Tatò; Oscar Glioti; Moreno Zani; Malcom Pagani
- Starring: Valerio Mastandrea; Dolores Fonzi
- Cinematography: Guido Michelotti
- Edited by: Chiara Vullo
- Music by: Tóti Gudnason
- Production companies: HT Film; Damocle; Tenderstories (with Rai Cinema)
- Distributed by: BiM Distribuzione
- Release date: 28 August 2024 (Venice)
- Running time: 93 minutes
- Country: Italy
- Language: Italian

Feeling Better (Italian: Nonostante, lit. 'Despite') is a 2024 Italian comedy-drama film directed by Valerio Mastandrea from a screenplay by Mastrandea and Enrico Audenino. The film stars Mastandrea and Dolores Fonzi as a hospital patients with different perspectives on life and illness.

Mastandrea's second feature film as director, Nonostante was selected to open the Orizzonti sidebar competition at the 81st Venice International Film Festival on 28 August 2024.

== Premise ==
In a hospital, comatose patients live a parallel life separated from their mortal bodies, able to interact with each other but not with others—patients, doctors, visitors, etc. The protagonist (unnamed, like all the other characters) lives his condition lightheartedly until a young woman, the victim of a car accident, is admitted to the hospital in a coma. This upsets his equilibrium, drawing him into a love story lived intensely "despite" the precariousness of their situation, suspended between life and death.

== Cast ==
- Valerio Mastandrea as Him
- Dolores Fonzi as Her
- Lino Musella as Curiosone
- Giorgio Montanini as Volontario
- Justin Alexandre Korovkin as Young Nonostante
- Barbara Ronchi as Curiosone's Wife
- Luca Lionello as Nonostante Sfascio
- Laura Morante as Veteran
- Claudia Della Seta as Caposala
- Stefania Orsola Garello as Nonostante Forestiera

== Production ==
Principal photography for Feeling Better took place between September and November 2023 in the frazioni of Fregenae and Maccarese within Fiumicino. The film was shot by cinematographer Guido Michelotti and edited by Chiara Vullo. Tóti Gudnason composed the original score for the film.

== Release ==
Feeling Better premiered on 28 August 2024, where it opened the Orizzonti sidebar section of that year's Venice Film Festival.

== Reception ==
The film has been described as "a small and surreal romantic comedy that nevertheless deviates from the usual ghost film thanks to its very original central idea", and "one of the more accessible cinematic takes on existentialism", featuring "a crowd-pleasing sweep and quirky verve".

=== Accolades ===
Award	Ceremony date	Category	Recipient	Result	Ref.
Venice Film Festival	07 September 2024	Orizzonti Award for Best Film	Nonostante	Nominated	
