= Lucia's Grace =

2018 film by Gianni Zanasi

- Theatrical release poster
- Italian: Troppa grazia
- Directed by: Gianni Zanasi
- Screenplay by: Gianni Zanasi; Giacomo Ciarrapico; Michele Pellegrini; Federica Pontremoli
- Produced by: Rita Rognoni; Beppe Caschetto
- Starring: Alba Rohrwacher; Elio Germano; Giuseppe Battiston
- Cinematography: Vladan Radovic
- Edited by: Rita Rognoni; Gianni Zanasi
- Music by: Niccolò Contessa
- Production companies: Pupkin Production; Rai Cinema
- Distributed by: BIM Distribuzione
- Release dates: 17 May 2018 (Cannes); 22 November 2018 (Italy)
- Running time: 110 minutes
- Country: Italy
- Language: Italian
- Budget: $1.2 million

Lucia's Grace (Italian: Troppa grazia, lit. 'Too Much Grace') is a 2018 Italian comedy-drama film directed by Gianni Zanasi. It was selected to screen in the Directors' Fortnight section at the 2018 Cannes Film Festival, where it won the Europa Cinemas Label Award for Best European Film.

== Cast ==
- Alba Rohrwacher as Lucia
- Elio Germano as Arturo
- Giuseppe Battiston as Paolo
- Hadas Yaron as the Madonna
- Carlotta Natoli as Claudia
- Thomas Trabacchi as Guido
- Daniele De Angelis as Fabio
- Rosa Vannucci as Rosa
- Teco Celio as Giulio Ravi
