= Questo mondo è per te =

- Film poster
- Directed by: Francesco Falaschi
- Written by: Filippo Bologna; Francesco Falaschi; Stefano Ruzzante
- Starring: Matteo Petrini; Eugenia Costantini; Paolo Sassanelli; Cecilia Dazzi
- Cinematography: Gianni Giannelli
- Edited by: Paola Freddi; Francesco De Matteis
- Music by: Luca Cresta; Pivio and Aldo De Scalzi; Claudio Pacini
- Release date: 1 April 2011
- Running time: 82 minutes
- Country: Italy
- Language: Italian

Questo mondo è per te (lit. 'This world is for you') is a 2011 Italian comedy film directed by Francesco Falaschi.

== Cast ==
- Matteo Petrini as Teo
- Eugenia Costantini as Chiara
- Paolo Sassanelli as Italo
- Cecilia Dazzi as Laura
- Fabrizia Sacchi as Carlotta
- Edoardo Natoli as Marco
- Domenico Diele as Luca Martini
- Massimiliano Bruno as Vagoni
- Paolo Migone as Pierluigi
- Sergio Sgrilli as Company owner
