= Good Morning Aman =

- Directed by: Claudio Noce
- Screenplay by: Claudio Noce; Heidrun Schleef; Diego Ribon
- Produced by: Dodo Fiori
- Starring: Valerio Mastandrea; Anita Caprioli
- Cinematography: Michele D'Attanasio
- Music by: Valerio Vigliar
- Release date: 2009
- Language: Italian

Good Morning Aman (also spelled Good Morning, Aman) is a 2009 Italian drama film directed by Claudio Noce, at his feature film debut.

The film premiered at the International Film Critics' Week of the 66th Venice International Film Festival. For this film, Noce was nominated for David di Donatello for best new director.

== Cast ==
- Valerio Mastandrea as Teodoro
- Anita Caprioli as Sara
- Said Sabrie as Aman
- Amin Nur as Said
- Giordano De Plano as Brando
- Adamo Dionisi as Bruno

== See also ==
- List of Italian films of 2009
- Films about immigration to Italy
