= C'è un posto nel mondo =

- Directed by: Francesco Falaschi
- Written by: Alessio Brizzi; Francesco Falaschi
- Starring: Cristiana Dell'Anna; Luigi Fedele; Daniele Parisi; Alessandra Arcangeli; Alessia Barela; Cecilia Dazzi; Jacopo Olmo Antinori; Gaja Masciale; Massimo Salvianti; Valentina Martone; Paolo Sassanelli; Fabrizia Sacchi; Angela Pepi
- Cinematography: Giuseppe Pignone
- Edited by: Claudio Di Mauro
- Music by: Paolo Vivaldi
- Release dates: 23 September 2024 (Lucca); 13 November 2025 (Italy)
- Running time: 106 minutes
- Country: Italy
- Language: Italian

C'è un posto nel mondo (lit. 'There is a place in the world') is a 2024 Italian drama film directed by Francesco Falaschi.

Written by Falaschi together with Alessio Brizzi, the film is set in a series of small Tuscan towns and follows three intertwined stories, each shaped by the tension between provincial life and the desire to leave it behind. The film premiered on 23 September 2024 at the Lucca Film Festival and was released in theaters on 13 November 2025.

== Production ==
The film is produced by Kahuna Film in collaboration with TVedo TV, Storie di Cinema, Rumont, and Dado Produzioni, with additional support from local associations such as the community cooperative "Il Borgo" of Montelaterone and the municipalities of Santa Fiora, Arcidosso, and Castel del Piano, where it was entirely filmed. Shooting took place in the summer of 2023.

== Cast ==
- Cristiana Dell'Anna as Anna Santi
- Luigi Fedele as Lorenzo
- Daniele Parisi as Prof. Lenzi
- Alessandra Arcangeli as Karima
- Alessia Barela as Sandra
- Cecilia Dazzi as Marta
- Jacopo Olmo Antinori as Giacomo
- Gaja Masciale as Rosa
- Massimo Salvianti as Aldo
- Valentina Martone as Ambra
- Paolo Sassanelli as Italo De Gherardis
- Fabrizia Sacchi as Laura
- Angela Pepi as Stefania
