= Physical Jerks =

- Directed by: Stefano Reali
- Cinematography: Mauro Pagani
- Music by: Marco Pontecorvo
- Release date: 1997
- Country: Italy
- Language: Italian

Physical Jerks (Italian: In barca a vela contromano) is a 1997 Italian comedy film directed by Stefano Reali. It is an adaptation of a semi-autobiographical comedy play by the same Reali.

The English version of its title is the (chiefly British) informal term for physical exercise.

== Cast ==
- Valerio Mastandrea: Massimo Migliarini
- Antonio Catania: Luigi "Gigi" Bonsanti
- Maurizio Mattioli: Carlo
- Emanuela Rossi: Wanda
- Pierfrancesco Favino: Castrovillari
- Davide Bechini: Giorgio Cupreo
- Enrico Brignano: Zinna
- Raffaele Vannoli: Brianza
