= The Complexity of Happiness =

- Directed by: Gianni Zanasi
- Written by: Gianni Zanasi; Lorenzo Favella; Michele Pellegrini
- Story by: Gianni Zanasi
- Produced by: Francesco Tatò
- Starring: Valerio Mastandrea; Giuseppe Battiston
- Cinematography: Vladan Radovic
- Edited by: Ugo De Rossi
- Music by: Niccolò Contessa
- Release date: November 21, 2015 (Turin Film Festival)
- Running time: 117 minutes
- Country: Italy
- Language: Italian

The Complexity of Happiness (Italian: La felicità è un sistema complesso [la felitʃiˈta ˌɛ un siˈstɛːma komˈplɛsso]) is a 2015 comedy film written and directed by Gianni Zanasi and starring Valerio Mastandrea and Giuseppe Battiston. It premiered at the 2015 Turin Film Festival.

== Cast ==
- Valerio Mastandrea as Enrico Giusti
- Giuseppe Battiston as Carlo Bernini
- Hadas Yaron as Avinoam
- Paolo Briguglia as Matteo Borghi
- Maurizio Donadoni as Uncle Umberto
- Teco Celio as Bernini Senior
- Filippo De Carli as Filippo Lievi
- Camilla Martini as Camilla Lievi
- Maurizio Lastrico as Ivano
- Domenico Diele as Bernini's assistant
- Daniele De Angelis as Nicola Giusti

== See also ==
- List of Italian films of 2015
