= Michele D'Attanasio =

Italian cinematographer (born 1976)

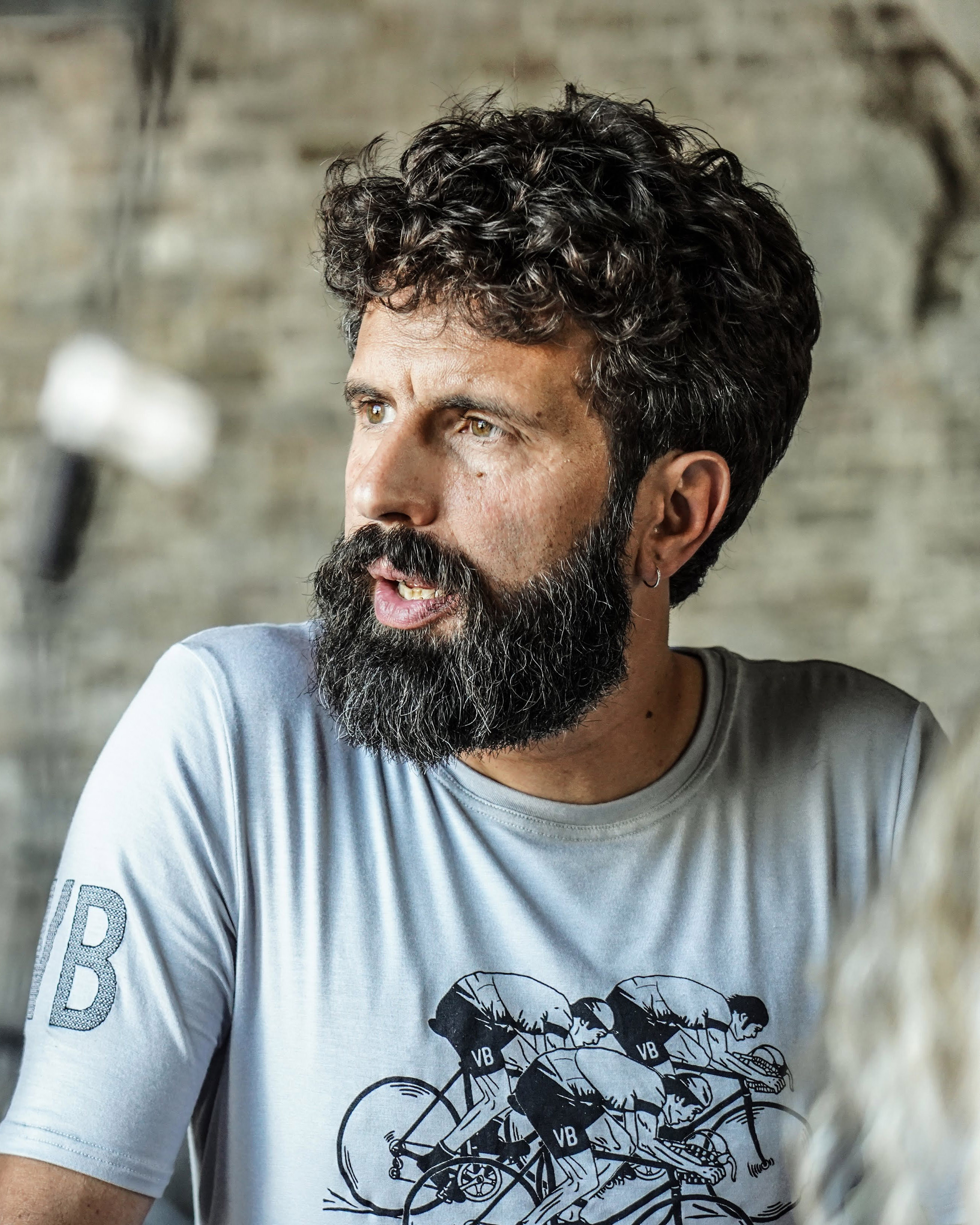
- D'Attanasio in 2022
- Born: 18 June 1976 (age 49); Pescara, Italy
- Occupation: Cinematographer
- Years active: 2003-present

Michele D'Attanasio (born 18 June 1976) is an Italian cinematographer.

== Life and career ==
Born in Pescara, D'Attanasio graduated from the liceo scientifico in his hometown, and then studied at the DAMS (Disciplines of Arts, Music, and Entertainment) department at the University of Bologna. He started his career in 2003, serving as assistant cinematographer of Paolo Carnera in Sergio Rubini's Love Returns. In 2010, he received a special mention at Nastri d'Argento Awards for the short film L’Ape e il Vento.

In 2017, D'Attanasio won the David di Donatello for Best Cinematography for Matteo Rovere's Italian Race. In 2022, he received a second David for Gabriele Mainetti's Freaks Out. In 2023, he was awarded a Nastro d'Argento for his work in Burning Hearts and Caravaggio's Shadow.

== Selected filmography ==
- Good Morning Aman (2009)
- The Last Shepherd (2013)
- The Ice Forest (2014)
- Quiet Bliss (2014)
- They Call Me Jeeg (2015)
- Italian Race (2016)
- Moglie e marito (2017)
- Couple Therapy for Cheaters (2017)
- Capri-Revolution (2018)
- The Most Beautiful Day in the World (2019)
- The Man Without Gravity (2019)
- Padrenostro (2020)
- Freaks Out (2021)
- Three Floors (2021)
- The Shadow of the Day (2022)
- Burning Hearts (2022)
- Caravaggio's Shadow (2022)
- A Brighter Tomorrow (2023)
- Eternal Visionary (2024)
