= Last Minute Marocco =

- Directed by: Francesco Falaschi
- Written by: Carla Giulia Casalini; Francesco Falaschi
- Produced by: Mohamed Asli; Giovanna Emidi; Silvia Natili; Rosanna Thau; Giulio Violati
- Starring: Valerio Mastandrea; Maria Grazia Cucinotta; Daniele De Angelis; Nicolas Vaporidis
- Cinematography: Antonello Emidi
- Music by: Pivio and Aldo De Scalzi
- Release date: 13 April 2007
- Running time: 88 minutes
- Country: Italy
- Language: Italian

Last Minute Marocco is a 2007 Italian comedy film directed by Francesco Falaschi.

== Cast ==
- Valerio Mastandrea as Sergio
- Maria Grazia Cucinotta as Valeria
- Daniele De Angelis as Valerio
- Nicolas Vaporidis as Andrea
- Lorenzo Balducci as Giacomo
- Esther Elisha as Jasmina
- Kesia Elwin as Tamu
- Stefano Dionisi as Giorgio
- Jamil Hammoudi as Samir
- Babak Karimi as Zin Krisha
- Paolo Sassanelli as Guido
