= Reckless (2018 film) =

2018 Italian comedy film

- Film poster
- Italian: Una vita spericolata
- Directed by: Marco Ponti
- Written by: Marco Ponti
- Produced by: Fulvio Lucisano; Federica Lucisano
- Starring: Lorenzo Richelmy; Matilda De Angelis; Eugenio Franceschini
- Cinematography: Roberto Forza
- Edited by: Consuelo Catucci
- Music by: Gigi Meroni
- Production company: Italian International Film
- Release date: 21 June 2018 (Italy)
- Running time: 102 minutes
- Country: Italy
- Language: Italian

Reckless (Italian: Una vita spericolata, lit. 'A reckless life') is a 2018 Italian comedy film directed by Marco Ponti.

== Plot ==
A 30-year-old mechanic on the verge of bankruptcy goes to the bank to ask for a loan, but in the blink of an eye, he finds himself the target of a robbery, with the police and the underworld on his tail and an unlikely hostage.

== Cast ==
- Lorenzo Richelmy as Roberto Rossi
- Matilda De Angelis as Soledad Agramante
- Eugenio Franceschini as BB Bartolomeo
- Antonio Gerardi as Leonardi
- Massimiliano Gallo as Captain Greppi
- Michela Cescon as Castiglioni
- Gigio Alberti as Cesco
- Libero De Rienzo as Inspector Bartolomeo Vanzetti
- Desirée Noferini as Eva
- Mirko Frezza as Rambo
- Luigi Mastrangelo as the sniper
- Benedetta Porcaroli as the young star
