= The Human Factor (2013 film) =

2013 film

- Directed by: Bruno Oliviero
- Screenplay by: Valentina Cicogna; Lionello Cerri
- Produced by: Gabriella Manfrè
- Starring: Giuseppe Battiston; Silvio Orlando; Sandra Ceccarelli
- Cinematography: Renaud Personnaz
- Edited by: Carlotta Cristiani
- Music by: Michael Stevens
- Release date: 2013
- Running time: 83 minutes
- Country: Italy

The Human Factor (Italian: La variabile umana) is a 2013 Italian neo-noir film directed by Bruno Oliviero. It entered the competition at the 2013 Locarno International Film Festival.

== Cast ==
- Silvio Orlando as Inspector Monaco
- Giuseppe Battiston as Levi
- Sandra Ceccarelli as Miss Ullrich
- Alice Raffaelli as Linda Monaco
