= 2002 in Italian television =

This is a list of Italian television-related events from 2002.

== Events ==
- 4 December – Bruno Cuomo wins the first season of Operazione Trionfo.

== Debuts ==
Rai

- L'eredità: A TV quiz based on the Argentine format El legado. As of 2023, with more than 5000 episodes, it is the longest-running television game show in Italy.

== Television shows ==
=== Drama ===
- Resurrection, by the Taviani Brothers, with Silvia Rocca and Timothy Peach, based on Lev Tolstoj's novel; 2 episodes.
- Perlasca un eroe italiano ("An Italian hero") – by Alberto Negrin, with Luca Zingaretti in the title role, Amanda Sandrelli and Giuliana Lojodice, music by Ennio Morricone; 2 episodes.
- The apocalypse – by Raffaele Mertes, with Richard Harris (St. John the Evangelist), Vittoria Bevlvedere and Paolo Villaggio. The thirteenth and final chapter of LUV VIDE's Bible project.
- Maria Josè l'ultima regina ("The last queen") – by Carlo Lizzani, with Barbora Bobulova as title role and Alberto Molinari as Umberto II; 2 episodes.

=== Variety ===
- Il caso Scarfoglia ("The Scarfoglia affair") – satirical variety show by Corrado Guzzanti (protagonist and director) with Marco Marzocca and Caterina Guzzanti. A cynical TV journalist, assisted by a fanatic priest, investigates the vanishing of an average man. The simulated enquiry serves as a common thread for absurd inventions, such as fake newsreels about the landing of a fascist expedition on Mars (Guzzanti later adapted these sketches into a movie, Fascisti su Marte).

=== Mediaset ===
- Grande Fratello (2000–present)

== Networks and services ==
=== Launches ===
Network	Type	Launch date	Notes	Source
GAY.tv	Cable and satellite	13 May		
DeeJay TV	Cable and satellite	10 June		
ESPN Classic	Cable and satellite	July		

== Deaths ==
Date	Name	Age	Cinematic credibility
24 January	Nunzio Filogamo	99	Italian television & radio presenter, actor & singer
16 March	Carmelo Bene	64	Italian stage actor and director

== See also ==
- 2002 in Italy
- List of Italian films of 2002
