= Cuore contro cuore =

- Genre: Drama
- Starring: Isabella Ferrari; Rocco Papaleo; Carlotta Natoli; Stefano Pesce; Victoria Cabello; Ennio Fantastichini
- Country of origin: Italy
- No. of seasons: 22

Original release
- Network: Canale 5
- Release: September 14, 2004 – January 5, 2005

Cuore contro cuore (Heart to heart) is a 2004 Italian drama television series directed by Riccardo Mosca, produced by Taodue and broadcast on Canale 5. The series stars Ennio Fantastichini, Isabella Ferrari and Carlotta Natoli.

== Cast ==
- Ennio Fantastichini: Claudio Donati
- Isabella Ferrari: Francesca De Luca
- Carlotta Natoli: Alessandra Vinci
- Rocco Papaleo: Rocco Amato
- Victoria Cabello: Alice
- Chiara de Bonis: Serena Maggi
- Nicolò Diana: Luca Donati

== See also ==
- List of Italian television series
