= Francesco Falaschi =

Italian film director and screenwriter

- Born: 6 August 1961 (age 65); Grosseto, Tuscany, Italy
- Education: University of Florence
- Occupations: Film director, screenwriter
- Years active: 1997–present

Francesco Falaschi (born 6 August 1961) is an Italian film director and screenwriter.

He won the David di Donatello for Best Short Film for Quasi fratelli in 1999. He was nominated for a David di Donatello and a Silver Ribbon for Best New Director in 2003 for his debut film I Am Emma.

== Life and career ==
Born in Grosseto in 1961, Falaschi graduated in film history from the University of Florence and began his career writing for several industry magazines, including Segnocinema. He made his directorial debut in 1997 with "Furto con destrezza", a segment starring Giorgio Tirabassi included in the Corti stellari collective film. He later directed Quasi fratelli, which earned him the David di Donatello for Best Short Film. In 1999, he also directed the short Adidabuma, featuring Elda Alvigini, Pierfrancesco Favino, and Marco Giallini.

His first feature film, I Am Emma, was released in 2002 with Cecilia Dazzi in the lead role. The comedy earned Falaschi nominations for Best New Director at both the David di Donatello and the Nastro d'Argento, though he did not win either award. Five years later, he directed his second feature, Last Minute Marocco, a comedy starring Valerio Mastandrea, Maria Grazia Cucinotta, and Nicolas Vaporidis.

His third feature, Questo mondo è per te, was released in 2011. Filmed in the Maremma region between Follonica, Grosseto, and Scansano, it starred Cecilia Dazzi, Paolo Sassanelli, and newcomer Matteo Petrini in the lead role.

In 2018, Falaschi returned to cinemas with As Needed, his fourth feature film, centered on the friendship between a disgraced chef and a young cook with Asperger syndrome. The film stars Vinicio Marchioni, Luigi Fedele, and Valeria Solarino.

== Filmography ==
Year	Title	Notes
1997	Corti stellari	Segment "Furto con destrezza"
1998	Quasi fratelli	Short film
1999	Adidabuma	Short film
2002	I Am Emma	Feature film debut
2004	Il minestrone	Short film
2007	Last Minute Marocco	
2007	Dalla finestra aperta	Short film
2011	Questo mondo è per te	
2012	My Tuscany: Art Storm	Short film
2018	As Needed	
2020	Ho tutto il tempo che vuoi	Short film
2024	C'è un posto nel mondo	
