= As Needed (film) =

- Directed by: Francesco Falaschi
- Written by: Filippo Bologna; Ugo Chiti; Francesco Falaschi; Federico Sperindei
- Produced by: Guglielmo Marchetti; Daniele Mazzocca; Notorious Pictures
- Starring: Vinicio Marchioni; Luigi Fedele; Valeria Solarino; Alessandro Haber; Gianfranco Gallo
- Cinematography: Stefano Falivene
- Edited by: Patrizio Marone
- Music by: Paolo Vivaldi
- Distributed by: Manymore Films; Hark; Notorious Pictures
- Release date: 5 April 2018
- Running time: 92 minutes

As Needed (Italian: Quanto basta) is a 2018 Italian comedy film by Francesco Falaschi.

== Plot ==
Arturo (Vinicio Marchioni) was a well known chef. He ends up in prison for anger issues. After he gets out, he must work at social services and teaches a group of people with Asperger syndrome to cook. One of his students, Guido (Luigi Fedele), succeeds to get into a culinary competition. As his tutor, Arturo must face the specific behavior of Guido, becomes drawn into his world and starts to care about him.

== Cast ==
- Vinicio Marchioni as Arturo
- Luigi Fedele as Guido
- Valeria Solarino as Anna
- Nicola Siri as Marinari
- Mirko Frezza as Marione
- Stephanie de Jongh as Concierge
- Benedetta Porcaroli as Giulietta
- Gianfranco Gallo as Corradi
- Alessandro Haber as Celso
- Ludovica Bargellini as Escort
