= Gianni Zanasi =

Italian film director (born 1965)

- Born: 1965 (age 59–60); Vignola, Italy
- Citizenship: Italy
- Occupations: Director; actor; writer
- Years active: 1993–present

Gianni Zanasi is an Italian film director, screenwriter and actor.

== Early life and education ==
Gianni Zanasi was born in Vignola in 1965. After studying philosophy at the University of Bologna, he enrolled in a school of theatrical writing and a course in film directed by Nanni Moretti. He attended the Experimental Center of Cinematography in Rome, where in 1992 he graduated from directing.

In 1992 made his first short film Le belle prove, which won a prize at the Torino Film Festival. Two years later the same cast was reassembled for his first feature film, Nella mischia (1995), which was selected for the Directors' Fortnight section of the Cannes Film Festival. His following film, See You, was entered into the main competition at the 1999 Venice Film Festival.

Zanasi also directed the television miniseries Fathers and Sons and the documentary Life is short but the day is long.

He returned to feature films in 2007, with the comedy Don't Think About It, starring Valerio Mastandrea, Anita Caprioli, Giuseppe Battiston, Caterina Murino, and others. Critically acclaimed, the film gave rise in 2009 to a television series of the same name, broadcast by Fox Italy, directed by Zanasi and Pellegrini, with the same cast as the original title.

In 2018 he directed Lucia's Grace.

== Filmography ==
Director
Title	Year	Notes
Nella mischia	1995	As director
See You	1999	Direction and screenplay
Don't Think About It	2007	Direction and screenplay
The Complexity of Happiness	2015	Direction and screenplay
Lucia's Grace	2018	Direction and screenplay

Writer
Title	Notes	Year
Le belle prove	Short film	1993
Nella mischia		1995
A domani	Director and screenplay	1999
Beside Myself	As an actor also	1999
The life's short but the day is long	Documentary. Original Title - La vita è breve ma la giornata è lunghissima	2004
Don't Think About It	Original Title - Non pensarci	2007
Non pensarci, la serie	TV series	2009

=== Others ===
- Cinque pezzi facili (2009)
- La grande abbuffata (2009)
- Il candidato (2009)
- Il padrino (2009)
- Pretty Woman (2009)
