= We All Fall Down (1997 film) =

- Directed by: Davide Ferrario
- Written by: Davide Ferrario
- Starring: Valerio Mastandrea; Caterina Caselli
- Cinematography: Giovanni Cavallini
- Music by: C.S.I.
- Distributed by: Columbia TriStar Films Italia
- Release date: 24 April 1997
- Country: Italy
- Language: Italian

We All Fall Down (Italian: Tutti giù per terra) is a 1997 Italian independent comedy film directed by Davide Ferrario. It is based on the novel Tutti giù per terra by Giuseppe Culicchia.

The film premiered at the 1997 Locarno International Film Festival, in which Valerio Mastandrea was awarded Best Actor.

== Cast ==
- Valerio Mastandrea: Walter
- Caterina Caselli: Caterina, Walter's aunt
- Benedetta Mazzini: Valeria
- Anita Caprioli Beatrice
- Carlo Monni: father of Walter
- Adriana Rinaldi: mother of Walter
- Luciana Littizzetto: post office assistant
- Giovanni Lindo Ferretti: member of the examination committee
- Vladimir Luxuria: prostitute
- Roberto Accornero: professor
