= Make a Fake =

- Film poster
- Italian: Senza arte né parte
- Directed by: Giovanni Albanese
- Written by: Giovanni Albanese; Fabio Bonifacci
- Starring: Vincenzo Salemme; Giuseppe Battiston; Donatella Finocchiaro; Hassani Shapi; Giulio Beranek; Sonia Bergamasco; Paolo Sassanelli
- Cinematography: Ramiro Civita
- Music by: Mauro Pagani
- Release date: 6 May 2011
- Country: Italy
- Language: Italian

Make a Fake (Italian: Senza arte né parte) is a 2011 Italian comedy film written and directed by Giovanni Albanese.

For his performance, Giuseppe Battiston won the Nastro d'Argento for Best Supporting Actor. The film was also nominated for the Nastro d'Argento for best comedy film. The film had a worldwide box office gross of $731,299.

== Plot ==
Arrogant and unscrupulous pasta factory owner Alfonso Tammaro tells his workers Enzo, Carmine and Bandula, that the factory will close and that they are laid off. When they ask if they can work in his new factory, he tells them he doesn't need them since it is completely automated. They are hard put to make ends meet, but Enzo's wife Aurora, who has been hired by Tammaro as a translator, convinces Tammaro to hire them as security guards at the old factory, which he now uses to store his latest enthusiasm, modern art. They find the art bizarre and the prices outrageously high. When Carmine accidentally breaks one of the artworks, they realize they have to create a duplicate, and find it surprisingly easy. Angry at Tammaro and desperate to improve their prospects, they decide to create duplicates and leave them for Tammaro, while selling the originals. They achieve some early success and become more ambitious. They travel to Rome to meet with a buyer who isn't too fussy about how they came into possession of such pieces, and Enzo is taken for a great new sensation in the art world. Put on the spot by a wealthy patron, he creates a new work by tracing the woman's hand with a pen and adding whatever bits of color he finds handy. For this "original" she gives him €1000.

Alas, just when they have finished recreating an entire collection of modern art, the scheme goes awry. After they have switched their fakes for the genuine artworks, but before they can sell the real ones, Tammaro closes down the operation and sends the (fake) collection to Rome for auction. Terrified at being found out and sent to prison, they confess what they have done to Aurora, who helps them come up with a plan to undo their fraud by switching the art pieces at the auction site. They are unable to complete the swap, and are astonished to learn that in the world of modern art, it doesn't even matter. The film ends with them once again completely broke, except for the €1000 Enzo made for his hand tracing, which they end up giving to Bandula so he can attend his daughter's wedding back in India.

== Cast ==
- Vincenzo Salemme as Enzo Gesumunno
- Giuseppe Battiston as Carmine Bandiera
- Donatella Finocchiaro as Aurora
- Hassani Shapi as Bandula
- Giulio Beranek as Marcellino
- Sonia Bergamasco as The Financial Advisor
- Paolo Sassanelli as Alfonso Tammaro
- Ernesto Mahieux as Don Elio
- Mariolina De Fano as Carmine's Mother
- Dante Marmone as Natale
- Daniele Esposito as Savino
- Ninni Bruschetta as Ciccio Rizzuto
