= See You (1999 film) =

1999 comedy film

- Directed by: Gianni Zanasi
- Screenplay by: Gianni Zanasi
- Starring: Stefania Rivi; Wilson Saba
- Cinematography: Giulio Pietromarchi
- Edited by: Rita Rognoni
- Music by: Giuliano Taviani
- Distributed by: Istituto Luce
- Release date: 1999
- Language: Italian

See You (Italian: A domani), also known as Until Tomorrow, is a 1999 Italian coming-of-age comedy-drama film written and directed by Gianni Zanasi. It premiered into the main competition at the 56th Venice International Film Festival.

== Cast ==
- Stefania Rivi as Stefania
- Wilson Saba as Angelo
- Andrea Corneti as Andrea
- Paolo Sassanelli as the Mechanic
- Mimmo Mancini as Capucci
- Cesare Bocci as Ferrari

== Production ==
The film was shot in the director's hometown Vignola. Zanasi described it as "a little film without a story". He wrote the screenplay in three weeks, and shot it in seven weeks, with eight weeks of post-production.

== Release ==
The film had its world premiere at the 56th edition of the Venice Film Festival, in which it entered the main competition.

== Reception ==
Variety's critic David Rooney described the film as "agreeable but slight", "self-consciously cute" and lacking spontaneity. Irene Bignardi from La Repubblica noted the Éric Rohmer influences in the film, and described it as overly simplistic. Tullio Kezich from Corriere della Sera referred to it as "initially pleasant, witty, and harmless, but increasingly weak as it progresses."
