= Sciopèn =

1982 film

- Directed by: Luciano Odorisio
- Written by: Luciano Odorisio
- Produced by: RAI
- Starring: Michele Placido; Giuliana De Sio; Fabio Traversa
- Cinematography: Nando Forni
- Edited by: Patrizia Proserpio
- Music by: Frédéric Chopin
- Release date: 1982
- Running time: 106 min
- Country: Italy
- Language: Italian

Sciopèn (also known as Chopin) is a 1982 Italian comedy film directed by Luciano Odorisio. The film entered the competition at the 39th Venice Film Festival, in which it won the Silver Lion for best first work. Odorisio was awarded best new director at the San Sebastián International Film Festival, while Tino Schirinzi won a Silver Ribbon for best supporting actor.

== Plot ==
In Abruzzo, in the town of Chieti, a group of friends, workers with the passion of classical music, try to rebuild a historic city orchestra, which no longer exists. The final concert provides only compositions the famous composer Frédéric Chopin, and the citizens of Chieti seem willing to finance the project. However, The mayor and local officials are skeptical because they think only of their own interests. So the project soon failed, but the workers come back from defeat with a smile.

== Cast ==
- Michele Placido: Francesco Maria Vitale
- Giuliana De Sio: Marta Vitale
- Adalberto Maria Merli: Andrea Serano
- Guido Celano: Cesare Serano '’zio Cesarin'’
- Tino Schirinzi: Nicolino
- Fabio Traversa: Vittorio
- Lino Troisi: Lawyer Gianni D'Angelo
- Anna Bonaiuto: Laura Serano

== See also ==
- List of Italian films of 1982
