= I Was a Dreamer =

2016 Italian film

- Poster
- Italian: Il più grande sogno
- Directed by: Michele Vannucci
- Written by: Michele Vannucci
- Produced by: Giovanni Pompili
- Starring: Mirko Frezza; Alessandro Borghi
- Cinematography: Matteo Vieille
- Edited by: Sara Zavarise
- Music by: Teho Teardo
- Release dates: 4 September 2016 (Venice); 24 November 2016 (Italy)
- Running time: 86 minutes
- Country: Italy
- Language: Italian

I Was a Dreamer (Italian: Il più grande sogno) is a 2016 Italian comedy drama film directed by Michele Vannucci at his feature film debut, and starring Mirko Frezza and Alessandro Borghi.

The film premiered on 4 September 2016 at the 73rd Venice International Film Festival in the "Orizzonti" section, and was released in Italy on 24 November 2016.

The film was awarded with a Special Jury Grand Prix and the Le Dauphiné libéré's Public Award at the Annecy Italian Film Festival. Borghi won the Nastro d'Argento for Best Supporting Actor, and Vannucci was nominated for best new director at the David di Donatello and at the Seattle International Film Festival.

== Cast ==
- Mirko Frezza as Mirko
- Alessandro Borghi as Boccione
- Vittorio Viviani as Pierino
- Milena Mancini as Milena
- Ivana Lotito as Paola
- Ginevra De Carolis as Michelle
