= Carlotta Natoli =

Italian actress

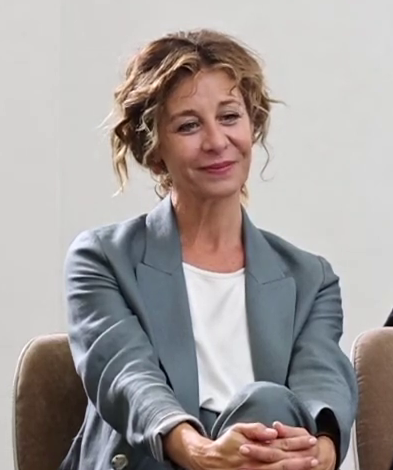
- Born: 29 May 1971 (age 55); Rome, Italy
- Occupation: Actress

Carlotta Natoli (born 29 May 1971) is an Italian actress.

== Life and career ==
Born in Rome, Italy, the daughter of Piero Natoli, she made her film debut in 1980, at the age of eight years, in her father's semi-autobiographical indie film Con... fusione. She later studied acting at the Actors Studio in New York City, and in early 1990s she started a professional career as an actress in films, television and on stage. In 1995 Natoli received a nomination for Nastro d'Argento for Best Supporting Actress thanks to her performance in L'estate di Bobby Charlton. In 2000s she had regular roles in the successful TV-series Distretto di Polizia and Tutti pazzi per amore.

Natoli is married to actor Thomas Trabacchi, with whom she has a son, Teo.

== Filmography ==
=== Film ===
Year	Title	Role(s)	Notes
1992	Gli assassini vanno in coppia	Young Margherita	
1992	Close Friends	Morena	
1993	Il tuffo	Elsa	
1994	An Italian Miracle	Samantha	Segment: "Sesto episodio"
1994	Ladri di cinema	Carlotta	
1995	Carogne	Anna	
1996	A Cold, Cold Winter	Monica	
1999	La vera madre	Chiara	
2001	Caruso, Zero for Conduct	Woman of the Past	
2001	La verità vi spiego sull'amore	Monica	
2008	All Human Rights for All	Performer	Segment: "Art. 29"
2010	18 Years Later	The Loquacious	
2015	Mi chiamo Maya	Lena	
2016	Fuga da Reuma Park	Reuma Park Speaker	Voice cameo
2017	Stories of Love That Cannot Belong to This World	Diana	
2017	Diva!	Valentina Cortese	
2018	Lucia's Grace	Claudia	
2020	I Hate Summer	Paola	
2021	Quattordici giorni	Marta	
2022	War	Antonella	
2022	Chiara	Cristiana	
2023	Da grandi	Inspector	

=== Television ===
Year	Title	Role(s)	Notes
1996	Les Clients d'Avrenos	Nouchi	Television movie
1998	Una donna per amico	Alice	Episode: "Nel nome del padre"
1999	Una farfalla nel cuore	Sister Marcella	Television movie
2000–2002	Distretto di Polizia	Dr. Angela Rivalta	Main role (season 1-2), guest star (season 3)
2003	Gli insoliti ignoti	Marisa Cattaneo	Television movie
2004	Sex Traffic	Dr. Lola Carizonne	Two-parts television movie
2004–2005	Cuore contro cuore	Alessandra Vinci	Main role
2007	La strana coppia	Gloria	Main role
2008	Ne parliamo a cena	Sabrina	Television movie
2008–2011	Tutti pazzi per amore	Monica Liverani	Main role
2011	Cenerentola	Veronica	Two-parts television movie
2012	Il caso Enzo Tortora: Dove eravamo rimasti?	Anna Tortora	Two-parts television movie
2013	Anna Karenina	Dolly Ščerbackaja	Two-parts television movie
2014–2016	Braccialetti rossi	Dr. Mariapia Lisandri	Main role
2015	The Mysteries of Laura	Inspector Laura Moretti	Lead role
2019	L'Aquila – Grandi speranze	Beatrice Merli	Main role
2019–2021	La Compagnia del Cigno	Vittoria Croce	Main role
2021	Mai scherzare con le stelle	Rosalyn	Television movie
2025	Gerri	PM Maddalena Crovace	Main role
