= Five Seconds =

2025 film by Paolo Virzì

- Italian theatrical release poster
- Italian: Cinque secondi
- Directed by: Paolo Virzì
- Written by: Francesco Bruni; Carlo Virzì; Paolo Virzì
- Produced by: Marco Belardi; Benedetto Habib; Fabrizio Donvito; Marco Cohen; Daniel Campos Pavoncelli; Ester Ligori
- Starring: Valerio Mastandrea; Galatea Bellugi; Ilaria Spada; Anna Ferraioli Ravel; Valeria Bruni Tedeschi
- Cinematography: Luca Bigazzi
- Edited by: Jacopo Quadri
- Music by: Carlo Virzì
- Production companies: GreenBoo Production; Indiana Production; Motorino Amaranto; Vision Distribution
- Distributed by: Vision Distribution
- Release dates: October 2025 (Rome); 30 October 2025 (Italy)
- Country: Italy

Five Seconds (Italian: Cinque secondi) is a 2025 Italian drama film co-written and directed by Paolo Virzì. It stars Valerio Mastandrea, Galatea Bellugi, Ilaria Spada, Anna Ferraioli Ravel, and Valeria Bruni Tedeschi. It premiered at the 20th Rome Film Festival on 18 October 2025 and received a theatrical release in Italy on 30 October 2025.

== Premise ==
Adriano is a middle-aged man living in a dilapidated villa in Tuscany, when a group of young idealistic students arrives to restore the villa's vineyards.

== Cast ==
- Valerio Mastandrea as Adriano Sereni
- Galatea Bellugi as Matilde
- Ilaria Spada as Letizia
- Anna Ferraioli Ravel
- Valeria Bruni Tedeschi as Giuliana

== Production ==
Principal photography began in Rome in October 2024.

== Release ==
A trailer was released on 19 August 2025. The film premiered in the Grand Public section of the 20th Rome Film Festival on 18 October 2025. It received a theatrical release in Italy on 30 October 2025.
