= A Cold, Cold Winter =

1996 Italian film

- Directed by: Roberto Cimpanelli
- Written by: Furio Scarpelli; Giacomo Scarpelli; Roberto Cimpanelli
- Starring: Cecilia Dazzi; Carlotta Natoli; Paola Tiziana Cruciani
- Cinematography: Maurizio Calvesi
- Edited by: Sergio Montanari
- Music by: Claudio Cimpanelli
- Release date: 1996
- Running time: 95 minutes
- Language: Italian

A Cold, Cold Winter (Italian: Un inverno freddo freddo) is a 1996 Italian romantic comedy film directed by Roberto Cimpanelli.

For this film Cimpanelli won the 1997 Nastro d'Argento for best new director.

== Cast ==
- Cecilia Dazzi as Rosanna
- Carlotta Natoli as Monica
- Paola Tiziana Cruciani as Danila
- Marco Messeri as Gianfrancesco
- Frédérique Feder as Guya
- Armando De Razza as Bruno
- Carlo Croccolo as Dr. Crocchia
- Riccardo Garrone as Lawyer Rossi Mannelli
- Valerio Mastandrea as Roby
- Francesca Reggiani as Ginevra
- Francesca Rettondini as Luana
- Giorgio Gobbi as Roby's friend
- Salvatore Puntillo as Rodolfo
- Sergio Fiorentini as Achille Di Cola
- Lidia Biondi as Maddalena
- Marzia Aquilani as Marzia
- Mimmo Palmara as Leo
