= Tino Schirinzi =

Italian actor and stage director

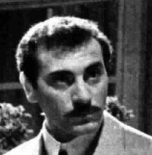
- Born: 12 August 1934; Taranto, Italy
- Died: 18 August 1993 (aged 59); Barberino di Mugello, Italy
- Occupations: Actor, stage director

Tino Schirinzi (12 August 1934 – 18 August 1993), was an Italian actor and stage director.

Born in Taranto, Schirinzi graduated in medicine, then he devoted himself to the theatre, often working at the Teatro Stabile in Turin and at the Piccolo Teatro in Milan. He created a successful artistic partnership with Piera Degli Esposti, and took part in Italian theatrical debut of Patrice Chéreau. After 1968, he was author of irreverent reinterpretations of works by Gabriele d'Annunzio, Carlo Goldoni and of the Elizabethan theatre which resulted in a resounding firing from the Vittoriale theatre.

Less active in cinema, in 1983 Schirinzi won a Nastro d'Argento for Best Supporting Actor thanks to his performance in Sciopèn.

Struck by an incurable cancer, for which he had lost his speech, in 1993 he killed himself with his wife Daisy Lumini, by jumping from the viaduct under construction on the Bilancino dam near Barberino di Mugello.

== Filmography ==
Year	Title	Role	Notes
1962	Luciano, una vita bruciata		
1977	Nenè	Ju and Pa's Father	
1977	Il giorno dell'Assunta		
1979	Liquirizia	Professore	
1981	Three Brothers	Raffaeles's Friend	
1982	Sciopèn	Nicolino	
1990	Matilda	Presidente	
