= The Power of the Past =

- Directed by: Piergiorgio Gay
- Written by: Lara Fremder; Piergiorgio Gay
- Based on: La forza del passato by Sandro Veronesi
- Produced by: Lionello Cerri
- Starring: Sergio Rubini; Bruno Ganz
- Cinematography: Luca Bigazzi
- Music by: Quintorigo
- Release date: 2002
- Country: Italy
- Language: Italian

The Power of the Past (Italian: La forza del passato, also known as Truth and Lies) is a 2002 Italian drama film directed by Piergiorgio Gay. It is based on the novel with the same name written by Sandro Veronesi. It entered the main competition at the 59th Venice International Film Festival.

== Cast ==
- Sergio Rubini as Gianni Orzan
- Bruno Ganz as Bogliasco
- Valeria Moriconi as Mother of Gianni
- Mariangela D'Abbraccio as Mother of Matteo
- Sandra Ceccarelli as Anna Orzan
- Giuseppe Battiston as Night Porter
- Aleksander Krosl as Arkady Fokin

== See also ==
- List of Italian films of 2002
