= Rocco Schiavone =

Italian crime drama television series

- Genre: Crime drama
- Created by: Antonio Manzini
- Written by: Antonio Manzini; Maurizio Careddu
- Directed by: Michele Soavi; Giulio Manfredonia; Simone Spada
- Starring: Marco Giallini; Ernesto D'Argenio; Massimiliano Caprara; Christian Ginepro; Gino Nardella
- Composers: Corrado Carosio; Pierangelo Fornaro
- Country of origin: Italy
- Original language: Italian
- No. of seasons: 6
- No. of episodes: 24

Production
- Running time: 95–111 minutes (original)
- Production companies: Cross Production; Rai Fiction

Original release
- Network: Rai 2
- Release: 9 November 2016 – present

Rocco Schiavone (also known as Rocco Schiavone: Ice Cold Murders) is an Italian crime drama television series broadcast on Rai 2. It was first aired on 9 November 2016. The series is based on the books by Antonio Manzini.

== Premise ==
Rocco Schiavone is a widowed detective superintendent who has recently been transferred from his beloved Rome to Aosta in the Italian Alps for disciplinary reasons. While hating his new posting, Schiavone investigates crimes that disrupt the peaceful Aosta Valley, although he sometimes resorts to questionable methods when doing so. His wife, who died almost ten years ago, is always present in his mind. He often sees her in other women and when he is home alone, he takes comfort in hearing her sound advice regarding various cases and the ethical issues they may pose.

== Cast ==
- Marco Giallini as Rocco Schiavone
- Ernesto D'Argenio (seasons 1–5) and Paolo Bernardini (season 6) as Italo Pierron
- Massimiliano Caprara as Michele Deruta
- Christian Ginepro as Domenico D'Intino
- Gino Nardella as Ugo Casella
- Filippo Dini as Maurizio Baldi
- Massimo Olcese as Andrea Costa
- Isabella Ragonese (seasons 1–4) and Miriam Dalmazio (seasons 5–present) as Marina
- Mirko Frezza as Furio Lattanzi
- Massimo Reale as Alberto Fumagalli
- Francesco Acquaroli as Sebastiano Cecchetti
- Tullio Sorrentino as Fabrizio "Brizio" Marchetti
- Claudia Vismara as Caterina Rispoli
- Fabio La Fata (season 1) and Alberto Lo Porto (season 4–present) as Antonio Scipioni
- Anna Ferzetti as Adele Talamonti
- Sargis Galstyan as Omar Shai

== Episodes ==
=== Series overview ===
Series	Episodes	Originally released		
Series	Episodes	First released	Last released	Network
1	6	9 November 2016	7 December 2016	Rai 2
2	4	17 October 2018	7 November 2018	Rai 2
3	4	2 October 2019	23 October 2019	Rai 2
4	2	17 March 2021	24 March 2021	Rai 2
5	4	5 April 2023	19 April 2023	Rai 2
6	4	19 February 2025	12 March 2025	Rai 2

=== Season 1 ===
No. overall	No. in season	Title	Duration	Original release date
1	1	"Black Slope" (Pista nera)	105 min	9 November 2016
2	2	"Adam's Rib" (La costola di Adamo)	108 min	11 November 2016
3	3	"Castor and Pollux" (Castore e Polluce)	96 min	18 November 2016
4	4	"Out of Season" (Non è stagione)	96 min	23 November 2016
5	5	"It Was in May" (Era di maggio)	97 min	30 November 2016
6	6	"Spring Cleaning" (Pulizie di primavera)	95 min	7 December 2016

=== Season 2 ===
No. overall	No. in season	Title	Duration	Original release date
7	1	"7.7.2007"	111 min	17 October 2018
8	2	"The Whole Truth" (Tutta la verità)	101 min	24 October 2018
9	3	"Dust and Shadow" (Pulvis et Umbra)	98 min	31 October 2018
10	4	"Before the Rooster Crows" (Prima che il gallo canti)	108 min	7 November 2018

=== Season 3 ===
No. overall	No. in season	Title	Duration	Original release date
11	1	"Life Goes On" (La vita va avanti)	97 min	2 October 2019
12	2	"The Tramp" (L'accattone)	100 min	9 October 2019
13	3	"Après la boule passe"	101 min	16 October 2019
14	4	"Faites vos jeux"	94 min	23 October 2019

=== Season 4 ===
No. overall	No. in season	Title	Duration	Original release date
15	1	"Rien ne va plus"	105 min	17 March 2021
16	2	"Ah Love, Love" (Ah l'amore, l'amore)	102 min	24 March 2021

=== Season 5 ===
No. overall	No. in season	Title	Duration	Original release date
17	1	"The Journey Continues" (Il viaggio continua)	98 min	5 April 2023
18	2	"Who Leaves and Who Stays" (Chi parte e chi resta)	102 min	12 April 2023
19	3	"Points of View" (Punti di vista)	102 min	14 April 2023
20	4	"Old Acquaintances" (Vecchie conoscenze)	96 min	19 April 2023

=== Season 6 ===
No. overall	No. in season	Title	Duration	Original release date
21	1	"The Roar of the Pigs" (La ruzzica de li porci)	TBA	19 February 2025
22	2	(Ossa loquuntur)	TBA	26 February 2025
23	3	"The Bones Speak" (Le ossa parlano)	TBA	5 March 2025
24	4	"Will our Heroes be able to Find their Friend who Mysteriously Disappeared in South America?" (Riusciranno i nostri eroi a ritrovare l'amico misteriosamente scomparso in Sudamerica?)	TBA	12 March 2025

== Production ==
The series is filmed in various parts of the Aosta Valley, including Aosta, the Skyway Monte Bianco, and Pila.

== Awards and nominations ==
Year	Award	Category	Nominee	Result	Ref.
2023	Nastri d'Argento Grandi Serie	Best Crime Series	Rocco Schiavone	Nominated	
2023	Nastri d'Argento Grandi Serie	Best Actor	Marco Giallini	Nominated	
