= Don't Think About It =

- Directed by: Gianni Zanasi
- Written by: Gianni Zanasi; Michele Pellegrini
- Produced by: Beppe Caschetto; Rita Rognoni
- Starring: Valerio Mastandrea; Anita Caprioli; Giuseppe Battiston
- Cinematography: Giulio Pietromarchi
- Edited by: Rita Rognoni
- Music by: Matt Messina
- Release dates: 1 September 2007 (Mostra del Cinema di Venezia); 4 April 2008 (Italy)
- Running time: 105 minutes
- Country: Italy
- Language: Italian

Don't Think About It (Italian: Non pensarci) is a 2007 Italian-language comedy directed by Gianni Zanasi.

== Synopsis ==
The film follows Stefano Nardini, a post-punk guitarist, stuck in a strange career limbo.

== Cast ==
- Valerio Mastandrea: Stefano Nardini
- Anita Caprioli: Michela Nardini
- Giuseppe Battiston: Alberto Nardini
- Caterina Murino: Nadine
- Paolo Briguglia: Paolo Guidi
- Dino Abbrescia: Carlo
- Teco Celio: Walter Nardini
- Gisella Burinato: Mamma Nardini
- Paolo Sassanelli: Francesco
