= I ragazzi del muretto =

- Genre: Teen drama
- Starring: Francesca Antonelli; Vincenzo Diglio; Claudio Lorimer; Elodie Treccani; Cecilia Dazzi; Amedeo Letizia; Barbara Ricci; Gabriele Pao Pei Andreoli; Alberto Rossi; Michela Rocco di Torrepadula; Lorenzo Amato; Riccardo Salerno; Samuela Sardo; Irene Grazioli; Alessandra Monti; Nicola Rebeschini; Ettore Bassi; Luciano Federico
- Country of origin: Italy
- Original language: Italian
- No. of seasons: 3
- No. of episodes: 52

Original release
- Network: Rai 2
- Release: March 28, 1991 – July 2, 1996

I ragazzi del muretto is an Italian teen drama television series.
