= Emanuela Rossi =

Italian actress

- Born: 24 January 1959 (age 67); Rome, Italy
- Occupations: Actress; voice actress; adapter; dubbing director
- Years active: 1970–present
- Spouse(s): Francesco Pannofino (m. 1997; div. 2006) (m. 2011)
- Children: 1
- Relatives: Massimo Rossi (brother); Riccardo Rossi (brother); Laura Boccanera (cousin); Fabio Boccanera (cousin)

Emanuela Rossi (born 24 January 1959) is an Italian actress and voice actress.

== Biography ==
Rossi has been active as an actress and dubbing artist since the early 1970s and has starred in more than ten films since 1989. She has long collaborated in television, theatre and dubbing with her husband Francesco Pannofino. Rossi is the official Italian voice of Michelle Pfeiffer and Emma Thompson. She has also dubbed Robin Wright, Rene Russo, Kim Basinger, Olivia Newton-John, Debra Winger, Cate Blanchett and Sissy Spacek in some of their works.

Rossi is best known for providing the Italian voices of Trinity in The Matrix, Mary Alice Young in Desperate Housewives, Demona in Gargoyles and she dubbed at least two characters in the soap opera The Young and the Restless.

=== Personal life ===
Rossi is the sister of voice actors Massimo and Riccardo Rossi and the cousin of voice actors Laura and Fabio Boccanera. Rossi is also married to actor and voice actor Francesco Pannofino. Together, they have one son, Andrea. They had divorced in 2006 but they eventually remarried in 2011.

== Filmography ==
- Qui squadra mobile - TV series, 1 episode (1973)
- Le finte bionde (1989) - Elena
- Physical Jerks (In barca a vela contromano) (1997) - Wanda
- That's Life (Così è la vita) (1998) - Woman with a child
- E adesso sesso (2001) - Barbara's mother
- Innamorata della morte (2005) - Nurse
- Seven Kilometers from Jerusalem (7 km da Gerusalemme) (2007) - Ginevra Santi
- Una notte da paura - TV Film (2012) – Sergio's wife
- Operazione vacanze (2012) - Sonia
- Poker Generation (2012) - Brigitte
- E la vita continua - short film (2012) - Lorenzo's mother
- SENZaria - short film (2013)
- Mio papà (2014) - Lawyer/Lea
- No Activity - Niente da segnalare - TV series (2014) - Marcello's wife
- Oltre la linea - short film (2015)
- Dove l'acqua con altra acqua si confonde - short film (2015)
- Come fai sbagli - TV series (2016) - Emmeti
- Being George Clooney - documentary (2016) - Herself
- The Pantani Affair (Il caso Pantani - L'omicidio di un campione) (2020) - Manuela Ronchi
- Daisy - short film (2022)
- Nato il sei ottobre - TV film (2024) - Signora De Marchis

== Voice work ==
- Leo the Lion (2005) - Avoria
- Winx Club: The Secret of the Lost Kingdom (2007), Winx Club 3D: Magical Adventure (2010), Winx Club: The Mystery of the Abyss (2014) - Faragonda
- Welcome Back Pinocchio (Bentornato Pinocchio) (2007) - Blue Fairy
- Pinocchio (2012) - The Dove
- Adrian - TV series (2019) - Gilda
- Trash - La leggenda della piramide magica (2020) - Kudo
