= I Am Emma =

- Directed by: Francesco Falaschi
- Written by: Salvatore De Mola; Francesco Falaschi; Stefano Ruzzante
- Produced by: Bernadette Carranza; Paolo Lucisano
- Starring: Cecilia Dazzi; Marco Giallini; Pierfrancesco Favino; Luigi Diberti
- Cinematography: Patrizio Patrizi
- Edited by: Paola Freddi
- Music by: Andrea Guerra
- Release date: 15 November 2002
- Running time: 87 minutes
- Country: Italy
- Language: Italian

I Am Emma (Italian: Emma sono io) is a 2002 Italian comedy film directed by Francesco Falaschi.

The movie was nominated for a David di Donatello and a Silver Ribbon for Best New Director in 2003.

== Cast ==
- Cecilia Dazzi as Emma
- Marco Giallini as Roberto
- Pierfrancesco Favino as Carlo
- Elda Alvigini as Marta
- Nicola Siri as Daniele
- Luigi Diberti as Marcello
- Claudia Coli as Elisa
- Federico Marinacci as Emilio
