= Giuseppe Battiston =

Italian actor

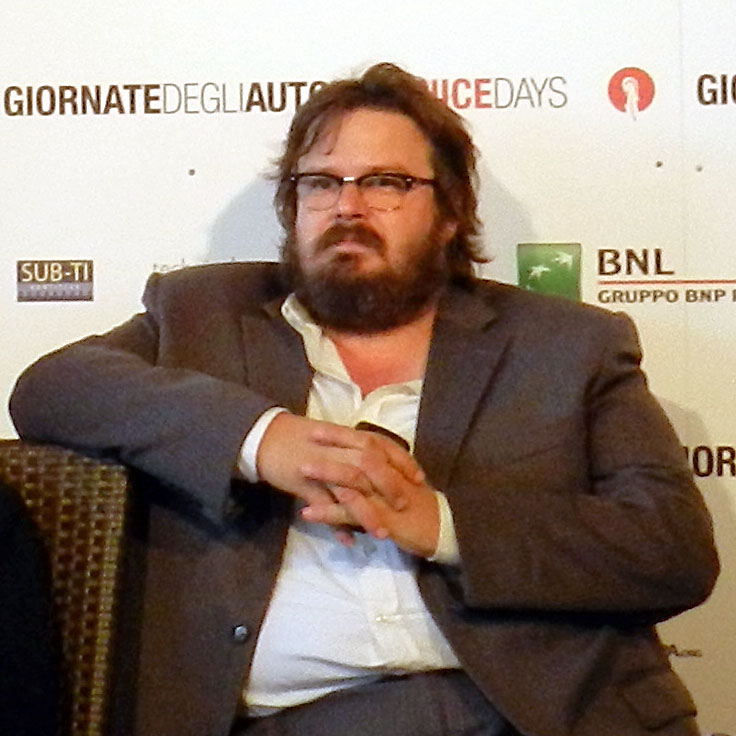
- Battiston in 2011
- Born: 22 July 1968 (age 58); Udine, Italy
- Occupation: Actor
- Years active: 1990–present

Giuseppe Battiston (born 22 July 1968) is an Italian actor. He has appeared in more than 50 films since 1990.

== Filmography ==
=== Film ===
Year	Title	Role	Notes
1990	Italia-Germania 4-3	Student	Credited as Giuseppe Battistoni
1993	A Soul Split in Two	Autogrill clerk	
1995	Era meglio morire da piccoli	Andrea	
1997	The Acrobats	Mondini	
1999	Il più lungo giorno	Uncle Mario	
2000	Bread and Tulips	Costantino Caponangeli	David di Donatello for Best Supporting Actor
2000	Ask Me If I'm Happy	Beppe the Thief	Credited as Beppe Battiston
2002	The Power of the Past	Night custodian	
2002	Nemmeno in un sogno	Zicarico	
2002	Un Aldo qualunque	Caimano	
2003	The Best of Youth	Man at the Ceremony	Cameo
2004	Agata and the Storm	Romeo d'Avanzo	Nominated—David di Donatello for Best Actor
2004	L'uomo perfetto	Simone	
2005	The Tiger and the Snow	Ermanno	
2005	The Beast in the Heart	Andrea Negri	Nominated—Nastro d'Argento for Best Supporting Actor
2005	Apnea	Renato	
2006	Don't Make Any Plans for Tonight	Vittorio	
2006	One Out of Two	Paolo	
2006	Our Country	Otello	
2007	La fine del mare	Dolce	
2007	Don't Think About It	Alberto Nardini	David di Donatello for Best Supporting Actor; Nominated—Nastro d'Argento for Best Supporting Actor (also for The Right Distance)
2007	Days and Clouds	Vito	Nominated—David di Donatello for Best Supporting Actor
2007	The Right Distance	Amos	Nominated—Nastro d'Argento for Best Supporting Actor (also for Don't Think About It)
2008	Love, Soccer and Other Catastrophes	'The Mine'	
2008	We Can Do That	Dr. Federico Furlan	
2009	The Hush	Ugo Ramponi	
2010	Come Undone	Alessio	
2010	La Passione	Ramiro	David di Donatello for Best Supporting Actor; Nastro d'Argento for Best Supporting Actor (also for Make a Fake and Unlikely Revolutionaries)
2010	News from the Excavations	The Professor	
2011	Make a Fake	Carmine Bandiera	Nastro d'Argento for Best Supporting Actor (also for La Passione and Unlikely Revolutionaries)
2011	Unlikely Revolutionaries	Bauer	Nastro d'Argento for Best Supporting Actor (also for La Passione and Make a Fake)
2011	Shun Li and the Poet	Devis	Nominated—David di Donatello for Best Supporting Actor
2011	Bar Sport	Antonio 'Onassis'	
2012	Garibaldi's Lovers	Amanzio	Nominated—David di Donatello for Best Supporting Actor
2013	The Human Factor	Carlo Levi	
2013	Zoran, My Nephew the Idiot	Paolo Bressan	Nominated—David di Donatello for Best Actor
2013	First Snowfall	Fabio	
2014	The Chair of Happiness	Father Weiner	Nominated—David di Donatello for Best Supporting Actor
2015	Pitza e datteri	Bepi	
2015	The Complexity of Happiness	Carlo Bernini	Nominated—David di Donatello for Best Supporting Actor
2016	Perfect Strangers	Peppe	
2017	After the War		
2018	Lucia's Grace		
2018	Just Believe	Marco Cilio	
2019	Il grande passo	Dario Cavalieri	
2020	È per il tuo bene	Sergio	
2022	Pinocchio	Stromboli	
2023	The Worst Days	Antonio	

=== Television ===
Year(s)	Title	Role	Notes
2001	Cuore		5 episodes
2003	L'avvocato	Reiber	1 episode
2004	Beyond Borders	Ugo Adinolfo	Television film
2005	Una famiglia in giallo	Dr. Biamonti	6 episodes
2005	La notte breve	Stefano	Television film
2008	Quo Vadis, Baby?	Toschi	1 episode
2008–2010	Tutti pazzi per amore	Dr. Freiss	Main role, 46 episodes
2009	A Mother's Ray of Hope	Dr. Frisanti	Television film
2009	The Collegno Amnesiac	Astolfi	Television film
2009	Non pensarci – La serie	Alberto Nardini	Main role, 12 episodes
2010	The Swing Girls	Pier Maria Canapa Canapone	Television film
2018	Trust	Bertolini	U.S. TV Series
