= Laura Boccanera =

Italian voice actress

- Born: 13 September 1961 (age 64); Rome, Italy
- Occupations: Voice actress; dubbing director
- Relatives: Fabio Boccanera (brother); Massimo Rossi (cousin); Emanuela Rossi (cousin); Riccardo Rossi (cousin)

Laura Boccanera (born 13 September 1961) is an Italian voice actress.

== Biography ==
Born in Rome, Boccanera started her voice acting career at 8. She is best known as the official Italian voice of Jodie Foster; other actresses she has often or occasionally dubbed include Julia Roberts, Sandra Bullock, Famke Janssen, Juliette Lewis, Winona Ryder, Annabella Sciorra and Catherine Keener. One of her most popular animated dubbing roles includes voicing Belle in the Italian dub of Beauty and the Beast, as well as Candy White Ardlay in Candy Candy, Morgana McCawber in the Darkwing Duck and Miranda Wright in Bonkers.

Some of Boccanera's other dubbing contributions include Bellatrix Lestrange (portrayed by Helena Bonham Carter) in the Harry Potter film series as well as Claire Underwood (portrayed by Robin Wright) in House of Cards.

=== Personal life ===
Boccanera is the sister of the voice actor Fabio Boccanera, and the cousin of Massimo Rossi, Emanuela Rossi and Riccardo Rossi, all of whom are also voice actors.

== Voice work ==
- Bianca in Kate - The Taming of the Shrew (Kate - La bisbetica domata) - animated film (2004)

=== Dubbing roles ===
==== Animation ====
- Midori in Grendizer
- Princess Cecilia of Finland in Hans Christian Andersen's The Little Mermaid
- Candice White Ardlray in Candy Candy
- Aruba, Helena and Kaori in Great Mazinger
- Various characters in Grendizer
- Kozue Ayuhara in Attack No. 1
- Anne-Marie in Belle and Sebastian
- Sally in Sally the Witch
- Jenny Maxwell and Kiuki Yak in Attack on Tomorrow!
- Marie Antoinette in The Rose of Versailles
- Various characters in Urusei Yatsura
- Teela in He-Man and the Masters of the Universe (Season 1)
- Yoko Misaki in Goliath the Super Fighter
- Belle in Beauty and the Beast, Beauty and the Beast: The Enchanted Christmas and Belle's Magical World
- Morgana McCawber in Darkwing Duck
- Miranda Wright in Bonkers
- Sally in The Nightmare Before Christmas
- Jessica Lovejoy, Luann Van Houten (seasons 7-8), Maggie Simpson (episode 20.20) and Paula in The Simpsons
- Nala in The Lion King and The Lion King II: Simba's Pride
- Sadira in Aladdin
- Princess Odette in The Swan Princess, The Swan Princess: Escape from Castle Mountain, The Swan Princess III: The Mystery of the Enchanted Treasure
- Various characters in Family Guy
- Rita the Fox in Jungledyret Hugo 2 - den store filmhelt
- Penny Sanchez (1st voice) (S1) in ChalkZone

==== Live action ====
- Alexandra Rover in Nim's Island
- Clarice Starling in The Silence of the Lambs
- Kathryn Railly in 12 Monkeys
- Capucine Jamet in A Girl Cut in Two
- Cynthia in A Walk to Remember
- The Wachati Princess in Ace Ventura: When Nature Calls
- Princess Isabelle in Braveheart
- Penny in Broken Flowers
- Mrs. Reed in Jane Eyre
- Bellatrix Lestrange in Harry Potter and the Order of the Phoenix, Harry Potter and the Half-Blood Prince, Harry Potter and the Deathly Hallows – Part 1, Harry Potter and the Deathly Hallows – Part 2
- Claire Underwood in House of Cards
- Mia in Love Actually
- Tracy Atwood in Mr. Brooks
- Ruth in Nine Lives
- Catherine Deane in The Cell
- Carla Purty in The Nutty Professor
- Annette Jennings in The Safety of Objects
- Diane Shaver in The Vanishing
- Audrey Billings in Transporter 2
- Grace McKenna in U Turn
- Betty Carver in What's Eating Gilbert Grape
