= Fabio Boccanera =

Italian voice actor

- Born: 28 October 1964 (age 61); Rome, Italy
- Occupation: Voice actor
- Years active: 1968–present
- Relatives: Laura Boccanera (sister); Massimo Rossi (cousin); Emanuela Rossi (cousin); Riccardo Rossi (cousin)

Fabio Boccanera (born 28 October 1964) is an Italian voice actor.

== Biography ==
Born in Rome, Boccanera began his dubbing career as a child and was involved as an actor in a couple of TV miniseries, in one of which he played the main role; he is well known as the Italian dubbed voice of Johnny Depp. He has also dubbed Colin Farrell and Ben Affleck in some of their films, as well as Christian Bale, Clive Owen, Billy Zane, Joaquin Phoenix and James Marsters.

Boccanera has also dubbed characters from many anime productions. He is the younger brother of voice actress Laura Boccanera and the cousin of voice actors Massimo, Emanuela and Riccardo Rossi.

== Filmography ==
- L'uomo del tesoro di Priamo – TV miniseries (1977)
- Un paio di scarpe per tanti chilometri - TV miniseries (1981)
- L'amore non basta (2008)

== Voice work ==
- How the Toys Saved Christmas - Lesto
- Tentacolino - Don Juan

=== Dubbing ===
==== Animation ====
- Hefty Smurf (1st voice) in The Smurfs
- Glaucus in Little Pollon
- Megane (3rd voice) and Shutaro Mendo (4th voice) in Urusei Yatsura
- Captain Planet in Captain Planet and the Planeteers
- Mozenrath in Aladdin
- Balto in Balto
- Little Creek in Spirit: Stallion of the Cimarron
- Narrator in ChalkZone
- Sitka in Brother Bear
- Chris Tucker, Ben Affleck, Dane Cook, Jean Shepherd, Daniel LaRusso, Adam Sandler (episode 7.13), Colin Farrell (episode 13.17), Johnny Depp and H. Jon Benjamin in Family Guy
- Prince Sancho in El Cid: The Legend
- Victor Van Dort in Corpse Bride
- Shockblast in Transformers: Energon
- Sterling Archer in Archer
- Whitney Doubleday in Big Top Scooby-Doo!
- Ronin in Epic
- Sherlock Gnomes in Sherlock Gnomes

==== Live action ====
- Jack Sparrow in Pirates of the Caribbean: The Curse of the Black Pearl, Pirates of the Caribbean: Dead Man's Chest, Pirates of the Caribbean: At World's End, Pirates of the Caribbean: On Stranger Tides, Pirates of the Caribbean: Dead Men Tell No Tales
- John Dillinger in Public Enemies
- Willy Wonka in Charlie and the Chocolate Factory
- Sweeney Todd in Sweeney Todd: The Demon Barber of Fleet Street
- Cesar in The Man Who Cried
- Tony's First Transformation in The Imaginarium of Doctor Parnassus
- Caledon Hockley in Titanic
- Roman Pearce in Fast Five, Fast & Furious 6, Furious 7, The Fate of the Furious
- Bobby Morrow in A Home at the End of the World
- David in The Lobster
- Huckleberry Finn in The New Adventures of Huckleberry Finn
- Spike in Buffy the Vampire Slayer, Angel
- Michael Samuelle in La Femme Nikita
- Frederick Abberline in From Hell
- Travers Robert Goff in Saving Mr. Banks

=== Video games ===
- Jack Sparrow in Pirates of the Caribbean: The Legend of Jack Sparrow
