= The Ice Forest =

- Directed by: Claudio Noce
- Screenplay by: Elisa Amoruso; Francesca Manieri; Claudio Noce; Diego Ribon
- Story by: Elisa Amoruso; Claudio Noce
- Produced by: Andrea Paris; Matteo Rovere
- Starring: Emir Kusturica; Kseniya Rappoport; Domenico Diele; Adriano Giannini
- Cinematography: Michele D'Attanasio
- Edited by: Federico Conforti; Paola Freddi; Andrea Maguolo
- Distributed by: Fandango
- Release date: October 23, 2014 (Rome Film Festival)
- Country: Italy
- Language: Italian

The Ice Forest (Italian: La foresta di ghiaccio) is a 2014 thriller film written and directed by Claudio Noce and starring Emir Kusturica, Kseniya Rappoport and Adriano Giannini. It premiered at the 2014 Rome Film Festival.

== Plot ==
Pietro, a young specialized technician, arrives in a small Alpine town on the Slovenian border to repair a fault in the high-altitude power plant and then suddenly finds himself faced with a strange disappearance. A strong clash is therefore created between the young Pietro and two brothers, Lorenzo and Secondo, who work and live in that area. Once Pietro discovers the origin of the secrets hidden in the valley, all tension erupts, starting a game of distorting mirrors in which no one, not even Lana, the bear expert, is immune from suspicion.

== Cast ==
- Emir Kusturica as Secondo
- Kseniya Rappoport as Lana
- Domenico Diele as Pietro
- Adriano Giannini as Lorenzo
- Giovanni Vettorazzo as Stanislao
- Maria Roveran as Sandra
- Rinat Khismatouline as Lazlo
- Danilo Panzeri as Attilio
- Marco Tenti as Manlio
- Adriano Mosca as Davide
- Stefano Pellizzari as Drago

== See also ==
- List of Italian films of 2014
