= Unlikely Revolutionaries =

- Theatrical release poster
- Directed by: Lucio Pellegrini
- Written by: Francesco Cenni; Lucio Pellegrini; Michele Pellegrini
- Produced by: Beppe Caschetto; Rita Rognoni
- Starring: Pierfrancesco Favino; Claudia Pandolfi; Fabio Volo; Giorgio Tirabassi; Giuseppe Battiston; Paolo Sassanelli
- Cinematography: Gian Enrico Bianchi
- Edited by: Walter Fasano
- Music by: Giuliano Taviani
- Production companies: ITC Movie; Pupkin Production; Warner Bros. Entertainment Italia
- Distributed by: Warner Bros. Pictures
- Release date: 22 October 2010
- Running time: 102 minutes
- Country: Italy
- Language: Italian

Unlikely Revolutionaries (Italian: Figli delle stelle) is a 2010 Italian crime comedy film directed by Lucio Pellegrini. It was shot between Rome and in Cervinia, Aosta Valley. The film was screened out of competition at the 2011 Montreal World Film Festival.

== Plot ==
A "chronic" precarious worker, a porter from Marghera, a somewhat seasoned university researcher, an insecure television journalist and a man just out of jail, all disappointed with their life, decide to take action and kidnap a minister.

== Cast ==
- Pierfrancesco Favino as Pepe
- Giuseppe Battiston as Bauer
- Fabio Volo as Toni
- Claudia Pandolfi as Marilù
- Giorgio Tirabassi as Stella
- Simona Nasi as Silvia, Stella's wife
- Fausto Maria Sciarappa as Umberto
- Paolo Sassanelli as Ramon
- Camilla Filippi as Marta
- Lydia Biondi as Pepe's Mother
- Edoardo Gabbriellini as Edo

== See also ==
- List of Italian films of 2010
