= La Passione (2010 film) =

2010 Italian comedy film

- Film poster
- Directed by: Carlo Mazzacurati
- Written by: Umberto Contarello; Doriana Leondeff; Carlo Mazzacurati; Marco Pettenello
- Produced by: Domenico Procacci
- Starring: Silvio Orlando; Giuseppe Battiston; Kasia Smutniak; Marco Messeri; Maria Paiato; Fausto Russo Alesi; Cristiana Capotondi; Stefania Sandrelli; Corrado Guzzanti
- Cinematography: Luca Bigazzi
- Music by: Carlo Crivelli, Orchestra Citta Aperta conducted by Robin O'Neil
- Production company: Fandango
- Release dates: 3 September 2010 (Venice); 24 September 2010 (Italy)
- Running time: 106 minutes
- Country: Italy
- Language: Italian

La Passione is a 2010 Italian comedy film directed by Carlo Mazzacurati. The film was nominated for the Golden Lion at the 67th Venice International Film Festival.

== Plot ==
In a small village in Umbria, the film director Gianni is in deep creative crisis. He lives like a bum, no longer an idea to create a movie when its problems if there is another bigger than all the others. His home water pipe broke, flooding as a precious fresco of the church in the country. Gianni has two choices: pay the damage or finance and direct a sacred representation of the Passion of Christ. Since we do not have the money to pay for the damage to the fresco ancient, Gianni agrees to regain the Italian public by directing the sacred representation.

== Cast ==
- Kasia Smutniak
- Stefania Sandrelli
- Cristiana Capotondi
- Silvio Orlando as Gianni Dubois
- Giuseppe Battiston
- Corrado Guzzanti
- Marco Messeri
