= Riccardo Rossi (voice actor) =

Italian voice actor

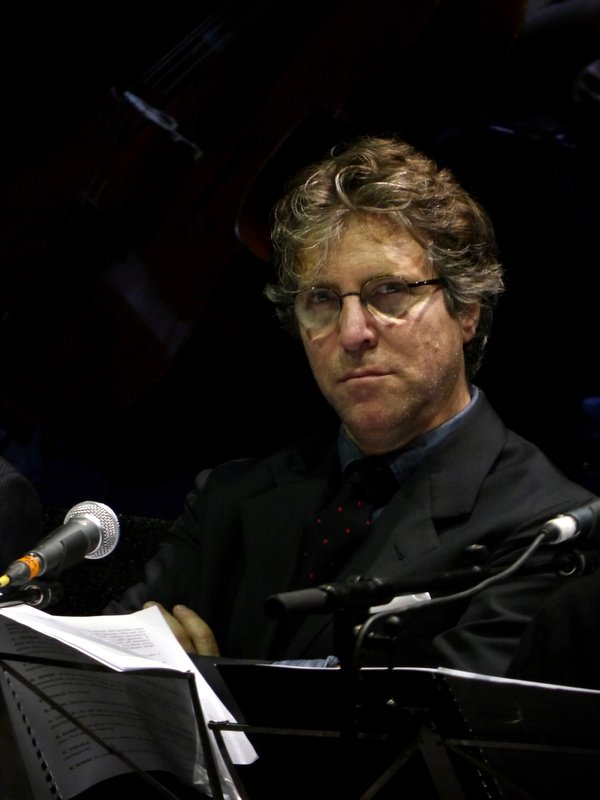
- Rossi in 2014
- Born: 9 November 1963 (age 62); Rome, Italy
- Occupations: Voice actor; dubbing director; Actor
- Years active: 1970–present
- Relatives: Massimo Rossi (brother); Emanuela Rossi (sister); Laura Boccanera (cousin); Fabio Boccanera (cousin)

Riccardo Rossi (born 9 November 1963) is an Italian voice actor.

== Biography ==
Born in Rome, Rossi began his career dubbing characters in Italian at an early age, also appearing in a few TV shows in the 1970s. As a child, Rossi voiced Toulouse in the Italian language dub of The Aristocats. As he grew up, he went on with his dubbing career, serving as the recurring Italian voice dubbing actor for Adam Sandler, Ben Affleck, Cuba Gooding Jr., Paul Walker (notably as Brian O'Conner in The Fast and the Furious film series) and Mark Ruffalo (including his role as Bruce Banner in the Marvel Cinematic Universe). Other actors he dubs includes Christian Bale, Johnny Depp, Matt Damon and Mark Wahlberg.

Rossi's character dubbing contributions include Simba as an adult from Disney's The Lion King; he also voiced many TV commercials.

In 2014, Rossi appeared in a minor role in Ermanno Olmi's anti-war film Greenery Will Bloom Again, while in 2016 he took part in the documentary film Being George Clooney.

=== Personal life ===
Rossi is the younger brother of voice actors Massimo and Emanuela Rossi. He is also the cousin of voice actors Laura and Fabio Boccanera.

== Voice work ==
=== Animation ===
- Sole and various characters in Pipì, Pupù e Rosmarina, Pipi, Pupu and Rosemary in: The Mystery of the Stolen Notes [it]
- Policeman #2 in Pinocchio (2012 film)

==== Italian-dubbed animated roles ====
- Toulouse in The Aristocats
- Ataru Moroboshi in Urusei Yatsura
- Narcissus in Little Pollon
- Simba in The Lion King, The Lion King II: Simba's Pride, The Lion King 1½, Timon & Pumbaa, The Lion Guard, Disney's House of Mouse
- Richie Sakai and Glen Tangier / Airshot in The Simpsons
- Dwayne (episode 2.01), R.J. (episode 3.10), Steve Castle/"That Guy", Paul Revere, Randy Munchnick (ep. 6x25), Flamo and Lars Fillmore in Futurama
- Terrance Mephesto, Denver Kid and Tweek Tweak (seasons 3-4) in South Park (1st Italian dub)
- Prince Proteus in Sinbad: Legend of the Seven Seas
- Sheen Estevez in Jimmy Neutron: Boy Genius
- Grouchy Smurf in The Smurfs (film)
- Lars Fillmore in Futurama: Bender's Big Score
- John Greystoke in Tarzan
- Zino in Boo, Zino & the Snurks

=== Live action ===
- Man interviewing René in Boris - TV series, season 1, episode 4

==== Italian-dubbed live-action roles ====
- Sonny Koufax in Big Daddy
- Longfellow Deeds in Mr. Deeds
- Barry Egan in Punch-Drunk Love
- Lenny Feder in Grown Ups, Grown Ups 2
- Chuck Levine in I Now Pronounce You Chuck & Larry
- Danny Maccabee in Just Go with It
- George Simmons in Funny People
- Donny Berger in That's My Boy
- Sam Brenner in Pixels
- Dave Buznik in Anger Management
- Henry Roth in 50 First Dates
- John Clasky in Spanglish
- Paul Crewe in The Longest Yard
- Michael Newman in Click
- Charlie Fineman in Reign Over Me
- Zohan Dvir in You Don't Mess with the Zohan
- Skeeter Bronson in Bedtime Stories
- Jack Sadelstein / Jill Sadelstein in Jack and Jill
- Jim Friedman in Blended
- Adam Sandler in Top Five
- Tommy Dunson Stockburn in The Ridiculous 6
- Max Simkin in The Cobbler
- Sandy Wexler in Sandy Wexler
- Danny Meyerowitz in The Meyerowitz Stories
- Nick Spitz in Murder Mystery
- Don Truby in Men, Women & Children
- Max Kessler in The Do-Over
- Kenny Lustig in The Week Of
- Howard Ratner in Uncut Gems
- Hubie Dubois in Hubie Halloween
- Brian O'Conner in The Fast and the Furious, 2 Fast 2 Furious, Fast & Furious, Fast Five, Fast & Furious 6, Furious 7
- Chris Johnston in Timeline
- Dean Sampson Jr. in She's All That
- Ben Garvey in The Lazarus Project
- John Rahway in Takers
- Damien Collier in Brick Mansions
- Bruce Banner / Hulk in The Avengers, Iron Man 3, Avengers: Age of Ultron, Thor: Ragnarok, Avengers: Infinity War, Captain Marvel, Avengers: Endgame
- Stan Fink in Eternal Sunshine of the Spotless Mind
- Ray Fanning in Collateral
- Dylan Rhodes-Shrike in Now You See Me, Now You See Me 2
- Dan Mulligan in Begin Again
- Dave Schultz in Foxcatcher
- Cam Stuart in Infinitely Polar Bear
- Michael Rezendes in Spotlight
- Jeff Daly in Rumor Has It
- Patrick Bateman in American Psycho
- Quinn Abercromby in Reign of Fire
- John Preston in Equilibrium
- Alfred Borden in The Prestige
- Dan Evans in 3:10 to Yuma
- John Connor in Terminator Salvation
- Irving Rosenfeld in American Hustle
- Russell Baze in Out of the Furnace
- Joseph J. Blocker in Hostiles
- Bagheera in Mowgli: Legend of the Jungle
- Ken Miles in Ford v Ferrari
- Gilbert Grape in What's Eating Gilbert Grape
- Paul Kemp in The Rum Diary
- Axel Blackmar in Arizona Dream
- John Arnold DeMarco / Don Juan in Don Juan DeMarco
- Joseph D. Pistone in Donnie Brasco
- William Blake / Johnny Depp in L.A. Without a Map
- Dean Corso in The Ninth Gate
- Spencer Armacost in The Astronaut's Wife
- Ichabod Crane in Sleepy Hollow
- George Jung in Blow
- Sheldon Jeffrey Sands in Once Upon a Time in Mexico
- Mort Rainey in Secret Window
- J. M. Barrie in Finding Neverland
- Guy LaPointe in Tusk, Yoga Hosers
- Rod Tidwell in Jerry Maguire
- Frank Sachs in As Good as It Gets
- Theo Caulder in Instinct
- Owen Templeton in Rat Race
- James Robert "Radio" Kennedy in Radio
- Darrin Hill in The Fighting Temptations
- Salim Adel in Dirty
- Charlie Hinton in Daddy Day Camp
- Michael Dixon in Linewatch
- Ben Carson in Gifted Hands: The Ben Carson Story
- Lewis Hicks in Ticking Clock
- Jonas Arbor in The Hit List
- El Chameleón 2 in Machete Kills
- Fred Gray in Selma
- Bruce Wayne / Batman in Batman v Superman: Dawn of Justice, Suicide Squad, and Justice League
- Neil in He's Just Not That Into You
- Bartleby in Dogma
- Rafe McCawley in Pearl Harbor
- Michael in The Third Wheel
- Lawrence Bowen in Daddy and Them
- Gavin Banek in Changing Lanes
- Holden McNeil / Ben Affleck in Jay and Silent Bob Strike Back
- Larry Gigli in Gigli
- Ollie Trinké in Jersey Girl
- George Reeves in Hollywoodland
- Jack Giamoro in Man About Town
- Stephen Collins in State of Play
- Doug MacRay in The Town
- Tony Mendez in Argo
- Neil in To the Wonder
- Chris Wolff in The Accountant
- Joe Coughlin in Live by Night
- Tom "Redfly" Davis in Triple Frontier
- Linus Caldwell in Ocean's Eleven, Ocean's Twelve, Ocean's Thirteen
- Britton Davis in Geronimo: An American Legend
- Mike McDermott in Rounders
- Steven Sanderson in Finding Forrester
- John Grady Cole in All the Pretty Horses
- Bryan Woodman in Syriana
- Francois Pienaar in Invictus
- George Lonegan in Hereafter
- Narrator in Inside Job
- Steve Butler in Promised Land
- Max Da Costa in Elysium
- Scott Thorson in Behind the Candelabra
- Mann in Interstellar
- William Garin in The Great Wall
- William Wharton in The Green Mile
- Eric Knox in Charlie's Angels
- Chuck Barris in Confessions of a Dangerous Mind
- Frank James in The Assassination of Jesse James by the Coward Robert Ford
- Sam Bell in Moon
- Robert Goode in Everybody's Fine
- Doc in Cowboys & Aliens
- John Moon in A Single Shot
- Eric Bowen in Poltergeist
- Jason Dixon in Three Billboards Outside Ebbing, Missouri
- Eddie Adams in Boogie Nights
- Mickey in The Basketball Diaries
- Leo Handler in The Yards
- Lewis Bartholomew in The Truth About Charlie
- Tommy Corn in I Heart Huckabees
- Chris Farraday in Contraband
- Éomer in The Lord of the Rings: The Two Towers, The Lord of the Rings: The Return of the King
- Priest in Priest
- Vincent Stevens in The Loft
- Will Ruiney in Hangman
- Danny Gallagher in Bent
- John Grimes in Black Hawk Down
- Young Edward Bloom in Big Fish
- Henry Bennett in The Impossible
- Ian Blaine in Cassandra's Dream
- Bill Fordham in August: Osage County
- Ethan Hunt in Mission: Impossible III
- Ray Ferrier in War of the Worlds
- Hannibal King in Blade: Trinity
- George Lutz in The Amityville Horror
- Michael Taylor in Fireflies in the Garden
- Matt Weston in Safe House
- Damian Hale / Mark Bitwell in Self/less
- E. Randol Schoenberg in Woman in Gold
- Bill Pope in Criminal
- Michael Bryce in The Hitman's Bodyguard
- Gary Winston in An Unfinished Life
- Hector in Our Kind of Traitor
- Steve McQueen in Once Upon a Time in Hollywood
- Jason "J.D." Dean in Heathers
- Andy Smith in Tales from the Darkside: The Movie
- Will Scarlett in Robin Hood: Prince of Thieves
- Clarence Worley in True Romance
- Adam in Untamed Heart
- Trevor Allen Finch in Who Is Cletis Tout?
- Choozy Doozy Host in Hot Tub Time Machine 2
- Dereck McKinley in The Summit
- Kirby Keager in St. Elmo's Fire
- James St. James in Men at Work
- Alex Furlong in Freejack
- Jack Colt in Loaded Weapon 1
- Bill Reimers in Another Stakeout
- Frank Wyatt in Judgment Night
- Jack Slayton in A Man Apart
- Fritz Messing in Catch and Release
- David in The Crazies
- Henry in Mother's Day
- CIA Agent Geneva in Snowden
