= Claudio Noce =

Italian film director

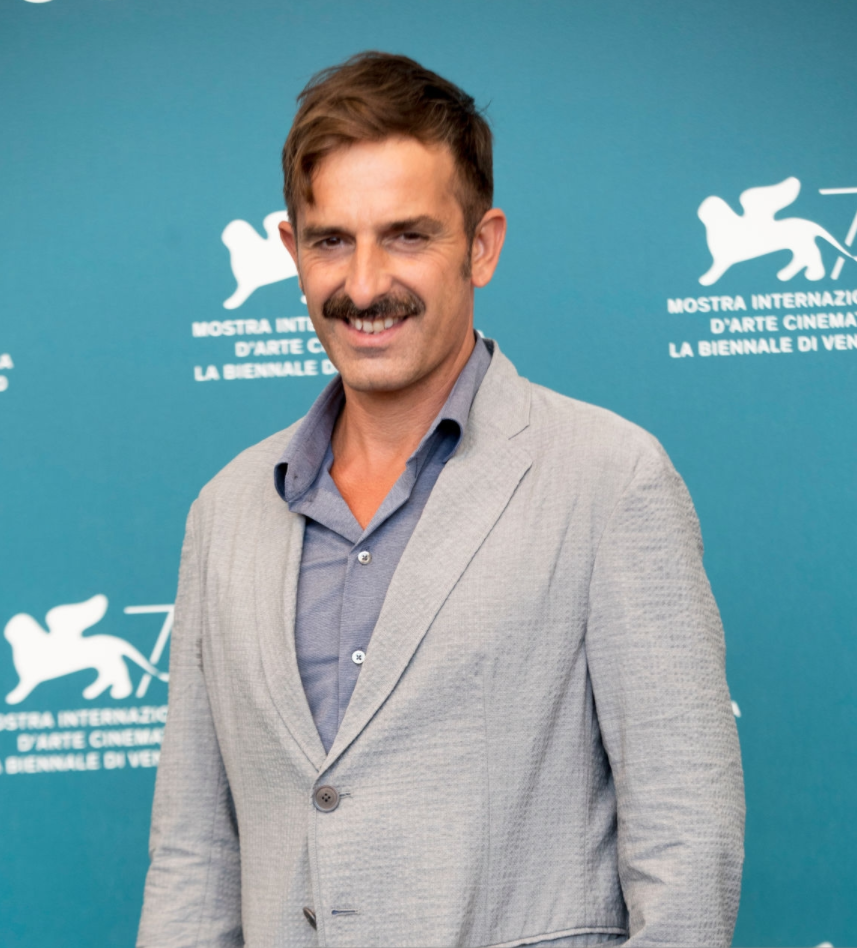
- Born: 1 August 1975 (age 49); Rome, Italy
- Occupation(s): Film director · screenwriter
- Years active: 2002–present

Claudio Noce (Italian pronunciation: [ˈklaudjo ˈnoːtʃe]; born 1 August 1975) is an Italian film director and screenwriter.

== Career ==
In 2005 he won the David di Donatello for Best Short Film for Aria. His feature film directorial debut Good Morning Aman was presented at the International Critics' Week of the 66th Venice Film Festival. His subsequent film The Ice Forest (2014) premiered at the Rome Film Festival. His third feature film, Padrenostro, was selected in competition at the 77th Venice Film Festival.

== Filmography ==
=== Films ===
Year	Title	Director	Writer	Notes
2002	Ai tempi del baratto	Yes	Yes	Documentary short film; Also cinematographer
2003	Gas	Yes	Yes	Short film
2005	Aria	Yes	Yes	Short film; Also producer David di Donatello for Best Short Film
2007	Adil e Yusuf	Yes	Yes	Short film Nominated – David di Donatello for Best Short Film
2009	Good Morning Aman	Yes	Yes	Nominated – David di Donatello for Best New Director; Nominated – Nastro d'Argento for Best New Director
2012	Altra musica	Yes	Yes	Short film
2014	The Ice Forest	Yes	Yes	
2020	Padrenostro	Yes	Yes	

=== Television ===
Year(s)	Title	Director	Writer	Notes
2017–2018	Thou Shalt Not Kill	Yes		Television series; 7 episodes
2019	1994	Yes		Television miniseries; 4 episodes
