= Paolo Sassanelli =

Italian actor and director

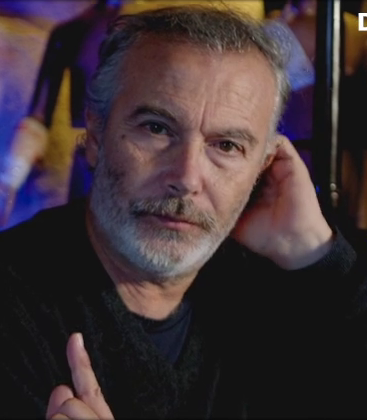
- Paolo Sassanelli (Déluge TV, 2022)
- Born: 29 October 1958 (age 68); Bari, Italy
- Occupation: Actor
- Height: 1.73 m (5 ft 8 in)

Paolo Sassanelli (born 29 October 1958) is an Italian stage, film and television actor and director.

== Life and career ==
Born in Bari, Sassanelli made his stage debut in his hometown in the second half of the 1980s. He then moved to Rome and had his breakout in the early 1990s with the role of Gabriele Serra in the TV-series Classe di ferro. In 2014, Sassanelli won the Nastro d'Argento for best supporting actor for his performance in the crime-comedy film Song'e Napule. His short film debut Guerra (War) won as best fiction at The Palace International Short Film Festival, in 2010.

== Selected filmography ==
- Colpo di luna (1995)
- Marriages (1998)
- See You (1999)
- Un medico in famiglia (TV, 1998-2014)
- Without Filter (2001)
- Compagni di scuola (TV, 2001)
- Now or Never (2003)
- The Life That I Want (2004)
- Red Like the Sky (2005)
- Codice rosso (TV, 2006)
- Last Minute Marocco (2007)
- Don't Think About It (2007)
- Days and Clouds (2007)
- Giulia Doesn't Date at Night (2009)
- Ubaldo Terzani Horror Show (2010)
- Unlikely Revolutionaries (2010)
- Questo mondo è per te (2011)
- Make a Fake (2011)
- Paura (2012)
- Song'e Napule (2013)
- Ever Been to the Moon? (2015)
- Somewhere Amazing (2015)
- Youtopia (2018)
- Magical Nights (2018)
- Tuttapposto (2019)
- C'è un posto nel mondo (2024)

=== Director ===
==== Feature films ====
- Two Little Italians, 2018

==== Short films ====
- Bei capelli (Beautiful hair), (2003)
- Uerra (War), (2009)
- Ammore (Love), (2013)
- Amore Disperato (Desperate Love), (2016)
- Un voto all'italiana (An Italian-style vote), (2017)
