= Cecilia Dazzi =

Italian actress, television personality and songwriter

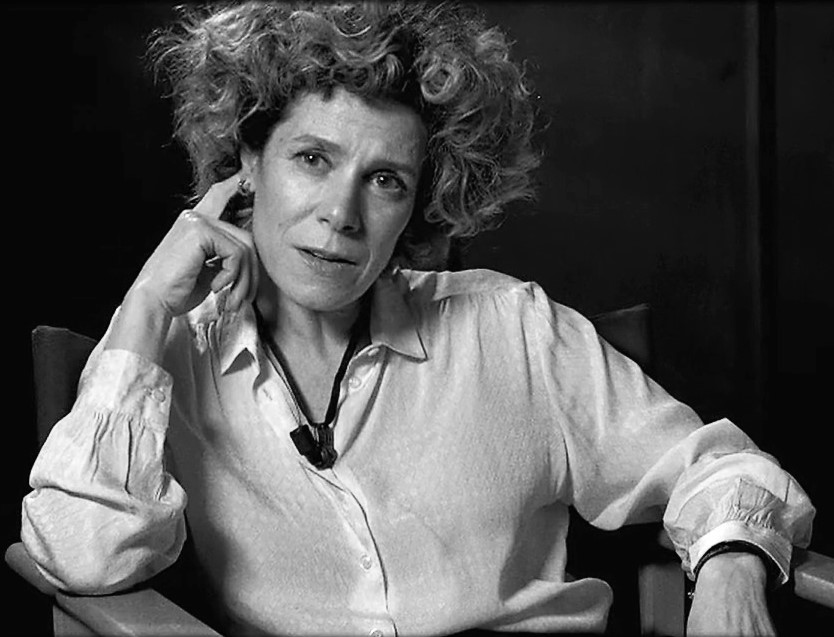
- Dazzi appears for the UNHCR in 2022.
- Born: 17 October 1969 (age 57); Rome, Italy
- Occupation: Actress

Cecilia Dazzi (born 17 October 1969) is an Italian actress, television personality and songwriter.

== Early life ==
Born in Rome, she is the daughter of film producer Tommaso Dazzi.

== Career ==
She made her film debut in 1987, in Ettore Scola's The Family. After working as an assistant of Carmelo Bene, in 1989 she went to New York City to pursue acting courses under Herbert Bergof. Her breakout came with the TV-series I ragazzi del muretto. In 1999 she won the David di Donatello for best supporting actress thanks to her performance in Cristina Comencini's Matrimoni. In 2002 she won the Flaiano Prize for her performance in I Am Emma.

Dazzi is also a songwriter, and she composed several of Niccolò Fabi's hits, including 'Capelli', winner of Mia Martini critics award. She also patented and developed a special pillow suitable for women with heavy breasts or suffering from mastitis.

== Filmography ==
Film
Year	Title	Role	Notes
1986	Molly O	Michelle	
1987	The Family	Beatrice	
1989	Smeraldina liberata	Smeraldina	
1993	Tra due risvegli	Giulia	
1993	La città dei sogni	Lilly	
1994	Miracolo italiano	Vanessa	
1995	Pierced by a Ray of Sun	Deborah	
1996	Albergo Roma	Milenina	
1996	A Cold, Cold Winter	Rosanna	
1997	Once We Were Strangers	City Hall Witness	
1997	La classe non è acqua	Prof.ssa Salvini	
1998	Marriages	Sandra	
2000	Twenty	Eva	
2000	The Witch Doctors	Cecile	
2001	Caruso, Zero for Conduct	Olga	
2002	I Am Emma	Emma	
2002	Bell'amico	Cecilia	
2004	Movimenti	Cate	
2004	Ogni volta che te ne vai	Pamela	
2004	Wimbledon	Billi Clementi	
2006	The Caiman	Luisa	
2007	Flood	Anna	
2007	Voce del verbo amore	Gioia	
2007	The Water Mask	Mirandolina	
2008	Scusa ma ti chiamo amore	Simona	
2009	Feisbum	Mamma Andrea	
2010	Sorry If I Want to Marry You	Simona	
2010	Sharm el Sheikh - Un'estate indimenticabile	Franca Romano	
2011	The Rite	Nurse	
2011	Questo mondo è per te	Laura	
2011	We Have a Pope	Mamma	
2013	White as Milk, Red as Blood	Angela	
2016	L'amore rubato	Maestra	
2019	The Two Popes	Nun	
2023	Needing a Friend?	Fiorenza	
2024	C'è un posto nel mondo	Marta	
2026	No Place to Be Single	Mariana	

Television
Year	Title	Role	Notes
1988	Piazza Navona	Martina	Episode: "Fernanda"
1991–1993	I ragazzi del muretto	Debora	28 episodes
1994	Jacob	Billah	Television film
1996	Dio vede e provvede	Suor Luminosa	Episode: "La lucciola"
1998	Il Mattino	Giulia	6 episodes
1999	Ama il tuo nemico	Cecilia	Television film
2000	Un colpo al cuore	Elisa Valenzi	Television film
2002	Operazione Kebab	Ispettore Eva Gabelli	Television film
2003	My House in Umbria	Rosa Crevelli	Television film
2004	O la va, o la spacca	Mariella	7 episodes
2006, 2009	L'ispettore Coliandro	Alessia Pira	2 episodes
2007	Caccia segreta	Elena Digiacomo	Television film
2007	Boris	Ana Canestri	Episode: "Quando un uomo sente la fine"
2007	La squadra	Elena Barone	2 episodes
2008	Amiche mie	Grazia	18 episodes
2014	Il tredicesimo apostolo	Francesca	Episode: "L'uomo nero"
2014	Beauty and the Beast	Albertine	Episode: "Tale 1"
2015	Saturday Night Fathers	Penelope	Episode: "Educazione sessuale"
2016	Bulletproof Heart	Giada	4 episodes
2017	La porta rossa	Eleonora Pavesi	12 episodes
2017	L'isola di Pietro	Ines Fadda	5 episodes
2019	La Reina del Sur	Stella	2 episodes
