= Piero Natoli =

Italian actor, director, and screenwriter

- Born: 22 November 1947; Rome, Italy
- Died: 8 May 2001 (aged 53); Rome, Italy
- Occupations: Actor; Director; Screenwriter
- Height: 1.82 m (6 ft 0 in)
- Children: Carlotta Natoli

Piero Natoli (22 November 1947 – 8 May 2001) was an Italian actor, director and screenwriter.

Born in Rome, Natoli entered the cinema industry as an assistant director to Marco Bellocchio. After an intense career as a documentarist for RAI, in 1980 he debuted as director and actor with Armonica a bocca. Between the second half of 1980s and the early 2000s he had an intense career as a character actor, working with Gabriele Muccino, Paolo Virzì, Marco Risi, Carlo Verdone and Antonello Grimaldi, among others. He died of an intracranial aneurysm. His daughter Carlotta Natoli is also an actress.
