= List of Italian submissions for the Academy Award for Best International Feature Film =

Best International Feature Film submissions from Italy

Highlights
- Debut: 1947
- Submissions: 73
- Nominations: 33
- Oscar winners: 14

Italy has submitted films for the Academy Award for Best International Feature Film (Note: The category was previously named the Academy Award for Best Foreign Language Film, but this was changed to the Academy Award for Best International Feature Film in April 2019, after the Academy deemed the word "Foreign" to be outdated.) since the conception of the award. The award is handed out annually by the United States Academy of Motion Picture Arts and Sciences to a feature-length motion picture produced outside the United States that contains primarily non-English dialogue. The category was not formally created until 1956 Academy Awards; however, between 1947 and 1955, the Academy presented Honorary Awards to the best foreign language films released in the United States. These awards were not competitive, as there were no nominees but simply a winner every year that was voted on by the Board of Governors of the Academy. Three Italian films received Honorary Awards during this period.

As of 2026, Italy has been nominated thirty-three times, winning fourteen times films. Among all countries that have submitted films for the award, Italy ranks first in terms of films that have won the award, followed by France (twelve awards) and Japan (five awards), and second in terms of nominees, behind France (forty-two nominations) and ahead of Spain (twenty-one nominations).

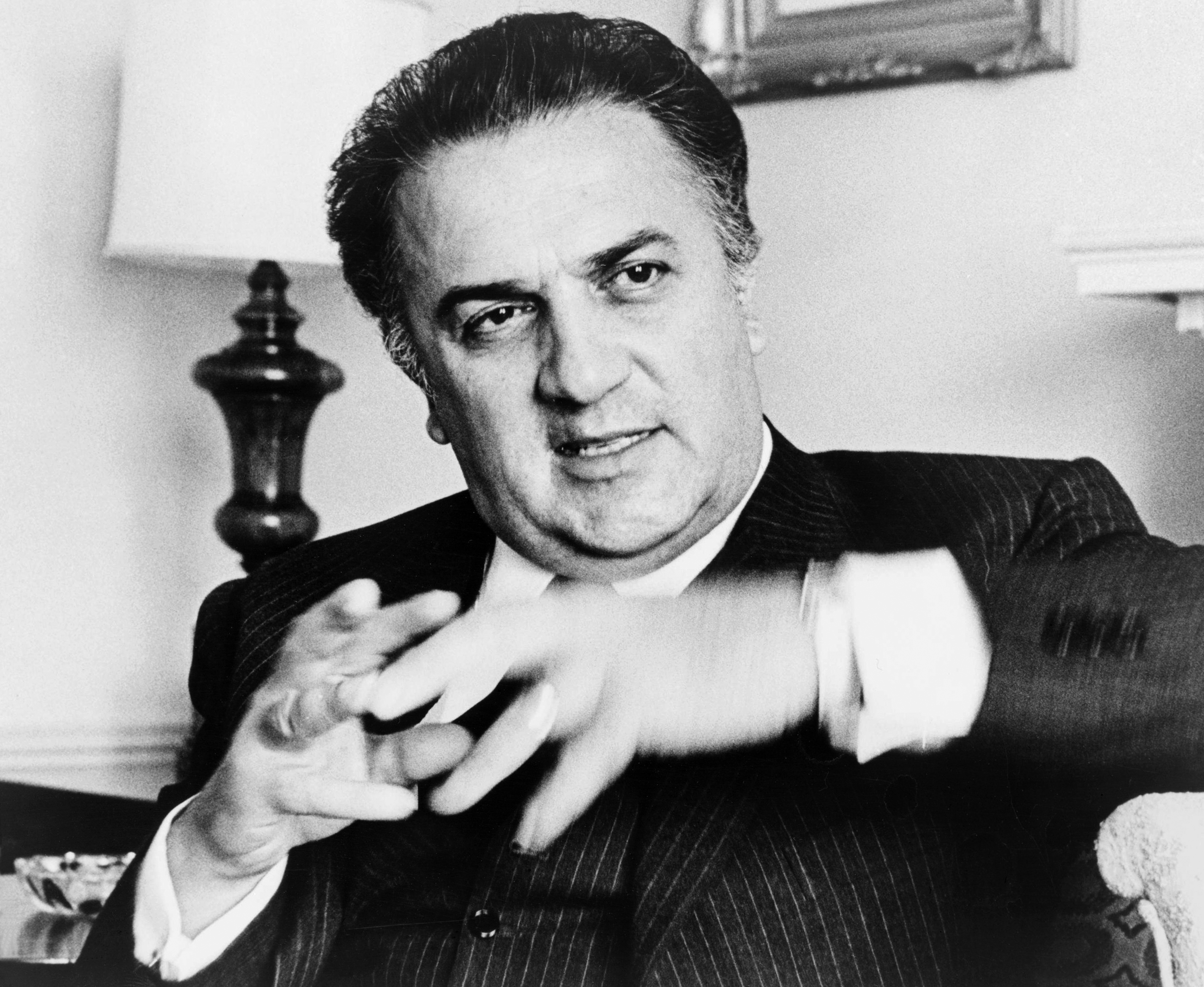
Federico Fellini won four times, the most for any filmmaker in the history, and had three other films were also submitted to the category.

== Submissions ==
The Academy of Motion Picture Arts and Sciences has invited the film industries of various countries to submit their best film for the Academy Award for Best International Feature Film since 1956. The International Feature Film Committee oversees the process and reviews all the submitted films. Following this, they vote via secret ballot to determine the five nominees for the award. Before the award was created, the Board of Governors of the Academy voted on a film every year that was considered the best foreign language film released in the United States, and there were no submissions.

The only Italian filmmakers to win multiple awards are Federico Fellini and Vittorio De Sica. Fellini received four awards for La Strada (1954), Nights of Cabiria (1957), 8½ (1963), and Amarcord (1973), the most in the history of the Academy, and had other three other films submitted but not nominated. De Sica received two Honorary Awards for Shoeshine (1946) and Bicycle Thieves (1948) and two competitive wins for Yesterday, Today and Tomorrow (1963) and The Garden of the Finzi-Continis (1970), alongside a nomination for Marriage Italian Style (1964).

Other winners include: The Walls of Malapaga (1950), Investigation of a Citizen Above Suspicion (1970), Cinema Paradiso (1989), Mediterraneo (1991), Life Is Beautiful (1998), and The Great Beauty (2013).

The Unknown Woman (2007) and Vermiglio (2024) advanced to the December shortlists, but were not nominated.

All the films submitted are primary in Italian. Below is a list of the films that have been submitted by Italy for review by the Academy for the award since its conception.

Year	Film title used in nomination	Original title	Director(s)	Result
1947 (20th)	Shoeshine	Sciuscià	Vittorio De Sica	Won Honorary Award
1949 (22nd)	Bicycle Thieves	Ladri di biciclette	Vittorio De Sica	Won Honorary Award
1950 (23rd)	The Walls of Malapaga	Le mura di Malapaga	René Clément	Won Honorary Award
1956 (29th)	La Strada		Federico Fellini	Won Academy Award
1957 (30th)	Nights of Cabiria	Le notti di Cabiria	Federico Fellini	Won Academy Award
1958 (31st)	Big Deal on Madonna Street	I soliti ignoti	Mario Monicelli	Nominated
1959 (32nd)	The Great War	La grande guerra	Mario Monicelli	Nominated
1960 (33rd)	Kapò		Gillo Pontecorvo	Nominated
1961 (34th)	La Notte		Michelangelo Antonioni	Not nominated
1962 (35th)	The Four Days of Naples	Le quattro giornate di Napoli	Nanni Loy	Nominated
1963 (36th)	8½	Otto e mezzo	Federico Fellini	Won Academy Award
1964 (37th)	Yesterday, Today and Tomorrow	Ieri, oggi, domani	Vittorio De Sica	Won Academy Award
1965 (38th)	Marriage Italian Style	Matrimonio all'Italiana	Vittorio De Sica	Nominated
1966 (39th)	The Battle of Algiers	La battaglia di Algeri	Gillo Pontecorvo	Nominated
1967 (40th)	China is Near	La Cina è vicina	Marco Bellocchio	Not nominated
1968 (41st)	The Girl with the Pistol	La ragazza con la pistola	Mario Monicelli	Nominated
1969 (42nd)	Fellini Satyricon		Federico Fellini	Not nominated
1970 (43rd)	Investigation of a Citizen Above Suspicion	Indagine su un cittadino al di sopra di ogni sospetto	Elio Petri	Won Academy Award
1971 (44th)	The Garden of the Finzi-Continis	Il giardino dei Finzi-Contini	Vittorio De Sica	Won Academy Award
1972 (45th)	Roma		Federico Fellini	Not nominated
1974 (47th)	Amarcord		Federico Fellini	Won Academy Award
1975 (48th)	Scent of a Woman	Profumo di donna	Dino Risi	Nominated
1976 (49th)	Seven Beauties	Pasqualino Settebellezze	Lina Wertmüller	Nominated
1977 (50th)	A Special Day	Una giornata particolare	Ettore Scola	Nominated
1978 (51st)	Viva Italia!	I nuovi mostri	Mario Monicelli, Dino Risi and Ettore Scola	Nominated
1979 (52nd)	To Forget Venice	Dimenticare Venezia	Franco Brusati	Nominated
1980 (53rd)	A Leap in the Dark	Salto nel vuoto	Marco Bellocchio	Not nominated
1981 (54th)	Three Brothers	Tre fratelli	Francesco Rosi	Nominated
1982 (55th)	The Night of the Shooting Stars	La notte di San Lorenzo	Paolo and Vittorio Taviani	Not nominated
1983 (56th)	And the Ship Sails On	E la nave va	Federico Fellini	Not nominated
1984 (57th)	Where's Picone?	Mi manda Picone	Nanni Loy	Not nominated
1985 (58th)	Macaroni	Maccheroni	Ettore Scola	Not nominated
1986 (59th)	Summer Night with Greek Profile, Almond Eyes and Scent of Basil	Notte d'estate con profilo greco, occhi a mandorla e odore di basilico	Lina Wertmüller	Not nominated
1987 (60th)	The Family	La famiglia	Ettore Scola	Nominated
1988 (61st)	The Legend of the Holy Drinker	La leggenda del santo bevitore	Ermanno Olmi	Not nominated
1989 (62nd)	Cinema Paradiso	Nuovo Cinema Paradiso	Giuseppe Tornatore	Won Academy Award
1990 (63rd)	Open Doors	Porte aperte	Gianni Amelio	Nominated
1991 (64th)	Mediterraneo		Gabriele Salvatores	Won Academy Award
1992 (65th)	The Stolen Children	Il ladro di bambini	Gianni Amelio	Not nominated
1993 (66th)	The Great Pumpkin	Il grande cocomero	Francesca Archibugi	Not nominated
1994 (67th)	Lamerica		Gianni Amelio	Not nominated
1995 (68th)	The Star Maker	L'uomo delle stelle	Giuseppe Tornatore	Nominated
1996 (69th)	My Generation	La mia generazione	Wilma Labate	Not nominated
1997 (70th)	The Best Man	Il testimone dello sposo	Pupi Avati	Not nominated
1998 (71st)	Life Is Beautiful	La vita è bella	Roberto Benigni	Won Academy Award
1999 (72nd)	Not of This World	Fuori dal mondo	Giuseppe Piccioni	Not nominated
2000 (73rd)	The Hundred Steps	I cento passi	Marco Tullio Giordana	Not nominated
2001 (74th)	The Son's Room	La stanza del figlio	Nanni Moretti	Not nominated
2002 (75th)	Pinocchio		Roberto Benigni	Not nominated
2003 (76th)	I'm Not Scared	Io non ho paura	Gabriele Salvatores	Not nominated
2004 (77th)	The Keys to the House	Le chiavi di casa	Gianni Amelio	Not nominated
2005 (78th)	Don't Tell	La bestia nel cuore	Cristina Comencini	Nominated
2006 (79th)	Golden Door	Nuovomondo	Emanuele Crialese	Not nominated
2007 (80th)	The Unknown Woman	La sconosciuta	Giuseppe Tornatore	Made shortlist
2008 (81st)	Gomorrah	Gomorra	Matteo Garrone	Not nominated
2009 (82nd)	Baarìa		Giuseppe Tornatore	Not nominated
2010 (83rd)	The First Beautiful Thing	La prima cosa bella	Paolo Virzì	Not nominated
2011 (84th)	Terraferma		Emanuele Crialese	Not nominated
2012 (85th)	Caesar Must Die	Cesare deve morire	Paolo and Vittorio Taviani	Not nominated
2013 (86th)	The Great Beauty	La grande bellezza	Paolo Sorrentino	Won Academy Award
2014 (87th)	Human Capital	Il capitale umano	Paolo Virzì	Not nominated
2015 (88th)	Don't Be Bad	Non essere cattivo	Claudio Caligari	Not nominated
2016 (89th)	Fire at Sea	Fuocoammare	Gianfranco Rosi	Not nominated
2017 (90th)	A Ciambra		Jonas Carpignano	Not nominated
2018 (91st)	Dogman		Matteo Garrone	Not nominated
2019 (92nd)	The Traitor	Il traditore	Marco Bellocchio	Not nominated
2020 (93rd)	Notturno		Gianfranco Rosi	Not nominated
2021 (94th)	The Hand of God	È stata la mano di Dio	Paolo Sorrentino	Nominated
2022 (95th)	Nostalgia		Mario Martone	Not nominated
2023 (96th)	Io Capitano		Matteo Garrone	Nominated
2024 (97th)	Vermiglio		Maura Delpero	Made shortlist
2025 (98th)	Familia		Francesco Costabile	Not nominated
2026 (99th)	The Spiral	L'estranea	Paolo Strippoli	Pending

== Shortlisted films ==
Every year since 2009, Italy has announced a list of finalists that varied in number over the years (from 4 to 25 films) before announcing its official Oscar nominee. The following films have been shortlisted by the Italy's Associazione Nazionale Industrie Cinematografiche Audiovisive e Multimediali:

Year	Films
2009	The Big Dream · The Double Hour · Vincere
2010	20 Cigarettes · Basilicata Coast to Coast · The Double Hour · I Am Love · Kiss Me Again · Loose Cannons · The Man Who Will Come · La nostra vita · Le quattro volte
2011	Angel of Evil · Escort in Love · Heavenly Body · News from the Excavations · Tatanka · We Believed · We Have a Pope
2012	Balancing Act · The Big Heart of Girls · Diaz – Don't Clean Up This Blood · Dormant Beauty · A Flat for Three · It Was the Son · Là-bas: A Criminal Education · Magnificent Presence · Reality
2013	A Five Star Life · Long Live Freedom · Midway – Between Life and Death · Miele · The Mongrel · Salvo
2014	Black Souls · Fasten Your Seatbelts · Quiet Bliss · Song'e Napule · Sotto una buona stella · The Wonders
2015	Blood of My Blood · For Your Love · Latin Lover · Leopardi · Mia Madre · Sworn Virgin · The Wait · You Can't Save Yourself Alone
2016	Indivisible · The Last Will Be the Last · Perfect Strangers · Pericle · Suburra · They Call Me Jeeg
2017	The Ark of Disperata · Cinderella the Cat · Equilibrium · Everything You Want · A Family · Fortunata · I Have Friends in Heaven · It's the Law · Pure Hearts · The Order of Things · Sicilian Ghost Story · The Stuff of Dreams · Tenderness
2018	As Needed · Bloody Richard · Boys Cry · Caina · L'Esodo · Il figlio sospeso · The Girl in the Fog · Happy as Lazzaro · Imperfect Age · Just Like My Son · Like a Cat on a Highway · Little Tito and the Aliens · Manuel · Naples in Veils · A Woman's Name · On My Skin · The Place · The Stolen Caravaggio · There's No Place Like Home · Where I've Never Lived
2019	The First King: Birth of an Empire · Martin Eden · Piranhas · The Vice of Hope
2020	18 Presents · Alone with Her Dreams · Aspromonte: Land of the Forgotten · Bad Tales · Bar Joseph · Citizens of the World · Il delitto Mattarella · The Goddess of Fortune · Hidden Away · Into the Labyrinth · The Life Ahead · The Macaluso Sisters · Out of My League · Padrenostro · Pinocchio · The Predators · Rose Island · The Shift · The Stonebreaker · Thou Shalt Not Hate · Tornare · Trash · The Truth About La Dolce Vita · Volare
2021	3/19 · A Chiara · A Girl Returned · The Bad Poet · The Catholic School · Mondocane · Ennio · I fratelli De Filippo · Freaks Out · The Giants · The Inner Cage · The King of Laughter · Parsifal · Superheroes · Three Floors · We Still Talk · Yaya e Lennie: The Walking Liberty
2022	Caravaggio's Shadow · Chiara · Dante · The Eight Mountains · Giulia · The Hummingbird · L'immensità · Lord of the Ants · Mindemic · Small Body · Strangeness
2023	A Brighter Tomorrow · Casanova's Return · Fireworks · Kidnapped · Last Night of Amore · La chimera · Land of Women · Mixed by Erry · Supernova · Thank You Guys · There's Still Tomorrow
2024	Accattaroma · Battlefield · Confidenza · Food for Profit · Gloria! · How Kids Roll · La casa di Ninetta · The Life Apart · Lubo · My Place Is Here · A Hundred Sundays · The Other Way · Palazzina Laf · Parthenope · Taxi Monamour · The Time It Takes · Volare · Zamora
2025	The American Backyard · Below the Clouds · The Boy with Pink Pants · The Children's Train · Diamonds · Diva Futura · Duse · Elisa · Eternal Visionary · The Flood · Fuori · The Great Ambition · Hey Joe · Joachim and the Apocalypse · The Last One for the Road · Madly · Naples to New York · The Negotiator · Siblings · The Sicilian Storyteller · The Tasters · Trifole · Vittoria
2026	Anna · Back to Buenos Aires · Children of the Monkey · Controcorrente A Rebours · The Eyes of Others · Finale: Allegro · Hitler's Big Fear: The Trial Against Degenerate Art · It Will Happen Tonight · Judas' Gospel · Life Goes This Way · Mosquitoes · Orfeo · Quasi Grazia · Per te · Primavera · La salita · Serpenti · Sweetheart · The Things Left Unspoken · Three Goodbyes

== See also ==
- List of Academy Award winners and nominees for Best International Feature Film
- List of Academy Award–winning foreign-language films
- List of countries by number of Academy Awards for Best International Feature Film
- Cinema of Italy
