= David di Donatello for Best Sound =

Annual Italian film award

The David di Donatello for Best Sound (Italian: David di Donatello per il miglior suono) is a film award presented annually by the Accademia del Cinema Italiano (ACI, Academy of Italian Cinema) to recognize outstanding efforts on the part of sound technicians who have worked within the Italian film industry during the year preceding the ceremony. Born in the 1988 edition of the David di Donatello award show as David di Donatello for Best Sound Engineer, from the 2017 edition onward, it has been called David di Donatello for Best Sound in order to recognize all sound technicians.

== Winners and nominees ==
Winners are indicated in bold.

=== 1980s ===
1988

- **Raffaele De Luca** – The Last Minute

1989

- **Candido Raini** – Mignon Has Come to Stay

=== 1990s ===
1990

- **Remo Ugolinelli** – Open Doors

1991

- **Tiziano Crotti** – Mediterraneo (ex aequo)
- **Remo Ugolinelli** – Ultra (ex aequo)

1992

- **Gaetano Carito** – The Invisible Wall

1993

- **Remo Ugolinelli** – The Escort

1994

- **Tullio Morganti** – Sud
- Benito Alchimede – Let's Not Keep in Touch
- Franco Borni – Caro diario

1995

- **Alessandro Zanon** – Lamerica
- Mario Iaquone and Daghi Rondanini – Nasty Love
- Tullio Morganti – No Skin

1996

- **Giancarlo Laurenzi** – Palermo – Milan One Way
- Massimo Loffredi – The Star Maker
- Alessandro Zanon – The Second Time

1997

- **Tullio Morganti** – Nirvana
- Maurizio Argentieri – The Prince of Homburg
- Gaetano Carito – A Cold, Cold Winter
- Tiziano Crotti – Sacred Silence
- Bruno Pupparo – My Generation

1998

- **Tullio Morganti** – Ovosodo
- Tullio Morganti – Life Is Beautiful
- Alessandro Zanon – April

1999

- **Gaetano Carito** – Radiofreccia
- Amedeo Casati – Not of this World
- Bruno Pupparo – Marriages

=== 2000s ===
2000

- **Maurizio Argentieri** – Bread and Tulips
- Tullio Morganti – The Sweet Sounds of Life
- Bruno Pupparo – But Forever in My Mind

2001

- **Gaetano Carito** – The Last Kiss
- Fulgenzio Ceccon – One Hundred Steps
- Alessandro Zanon – The Son's Room

2002

- **Remo Ugolinelli** – Light of My Eyes

2003

- **Andrea Giorgio Moser** – El Alamein: The Line of Fire
- Maurizio Argentieri – Casomai
- Gaetano Carito – Remember Me, My Love
- Gaetano Carito – Maximum Velocity (V-Max)
- Marco Grillo – Facing Windows

2004

- **Fulgenzio Ceccon** – The Best of Youth
- Gaetano Carito – Good Morning, Night
- Mario Iaquone – Don't Move
- Mauro Lazzaro – I'm Not Scared
- Miguel Polo – What Will Happen to Us

2005

- **Alessandro Zanon** – The Keys to the House
- Mario Dallimonti – Come into the Light
- Gaetano Carito and Pierpaolo Merafino – Manual of Love
- Marco Grillo – Sacred Heart
- Daghi Rondanini and Emanuele Cecere – The Consequences of Love

2006

- **Alessandro Zanon** – The Caiman
- Benito Alchimede and Maurizio Grassi – Notte prima degli esami
- Gaetano Carito – My Best Enemy
- Mario Iaquone – Romanzo Criminale
- Bruno Pupparo – The Beast in the Heart

2007

- **Bruno Pupparo** – My Brother Is an Only Child
- Mario Iaquone – Along the Ridge
- Pierre Yves Labouè – Nuovomondo
- Gilberto Martinelli – The Unknown Woman
- Marco Grillo – Saturn in Opposition

2008

- **Alessandro Zanon** – The Girl by the Lake
- Gaetano Carito – Quiet Chaos
- François Musy – Days and Clouds
- Bruno Pupparo – Black and White
- Remo Ugolinelli – The Right Distance

2009

- **Maricetta Lombardo** – Gomorrah
- Emanuele Cecere – Il divo
- Marco Fiumara – Many Kisses Later
- Gaetano Carito, Marco Grillo, and Bruno Pupparo – Italians
- Bruno Pupparo – We Can Do That

=== 2010s ===
2010

- **Carlo Missidenti** – The Man Who Will Come
- Faouzi Thabet – Baarìa
- Bruno Pupparo – Genitori & figli – Agitare bene prima dell'uso
- Mario Iaquone – The First Beautiful Thing
- Gaetano Carito – Vincere

2011

- **Bruno Pupparo** – La nostra vita
- Mario Iaquone – 20 Cigarettes
- Francesco Liotard – Basilicata Coast to Coast
- Paolo Benvenuti and Simone Paolo Olivero – Le quattro volte
- Gaetano Carito and Maricetta Lombardo – Noi credevamo

2012

- **Benito Alchimede** and **Brando Mosca** – Caesar Must Die
- Gilberto Martinelli – ACAB – All Cops Are Bastards
- Alessandro Zanon – We Have a Pope
- Fulgenzio Ceccon – Piazza Fontana: The Italian Conspiracy
- Ray Cross and William Sarokin – This Must Be the Place

2013

- **Remo Ugolinelli** and **Alessandro Palmerini** – Diaz – Don't Clean Up This Blood
- Gaetano Carito and Pierpaolo Merafino – Dormant Beauty
- Fulgenzio Ceccon – Long Live Freedom
- Maricetta Lombardo – Reality
- Gilberto Martinelli – The Best Offer

2014

- **Roberto Mozzarelli** – Human Capital
- Maurizio Argentieri – Those Happy Years
- Angelo Bonanni – I Can Quit Whenever I Want
- Emanuele Cecere – The Great Beauty
- Marco Grillo and Mirko Pantalla – Fasten Your Seatbelts

2015

- **Stefano Campus** – Black Souls
- Remo Ugolinelli – An Italian Name
- Alessandro Zanon – Mia Madre
- Gilberto Martinelli – The Invisible Boy
- Francesco Liotard – Greenery Will Bloom Again

2016

- **Angelo Bonanni** – Don't Be Bad
- Umberto Montesanti – Perfect Strangers
- Maricetta Lombardo – Tale of Tales
- Valentino Giannì – They Call Me Jeeg
- Emanuele Cecere – Youth

2017

- **Angelo Bonanni**, **Diego De Santis**, **Mirko Perri**, and **Michele Mazzucco** – Italian Race
- Valentino Giannì, Fabio Conca, Sandro Rossi, Omar Abouzaid, Lilio Rosato, and Francesco Cucinelli – Indivisible
- Filippo Porcari, Federica Ripani, Claudio Spinelli, Marco Marinelli, and Massimo Marinelli – La stoffa dei sogni
- Alessandro Bianchi, Luca Novelli, Daniela Bassani, Fabrizio Quadroli, and Gianni Pallotto – Like Crazy
- Gaetano Carito, Pierpaolo Lorenzo, Lilio Rosato, Roberto Cappannelli, and Gianluca Basili – Sweet Dreams

2018

- **Adriano Di Lorenzo**, **Alberto Padoan**, **Marc Bastien**, **Eric Grattepain**, and **Franco Piscopo** – Nico, 1988
- Giuseppe Tripodi, Florian Fabre, and Julien Perez – A Ciambra
- Giancarlo Rutigliano, Andrea Cutillo, and Giorgio Molfini – Cinderella the Cat
- Lavinia Burcheri, Simone Costantino, Claudio Spinelli, Gianluca Basili, Sergio Basili, Antonio Tirinelli, and Nadia Paone – Love and Bullets
- Fabio Conca, Giuliano Marcaccini, Daniele De Angelis, Giuseppe D'Amato, Antonio Giannantonio, Dario Calvari, and Alessandro Checcacci – Napoli velata

2019

- **Maricetta Lombardo**, **Alessandro Molaioli**, **Davide Favargiotti**, **Mirko Perri**, **Mauro Eusepi**, and **Michele Mazzucco** – Dogman
- Yves-Marie Omnes, Thomas Gastinel, Davide Favargiotti, Jean-Pierre Laforce – Call Me by Your Name
- Alessandro Zanon, Alessandro Palmerini, Alessandro Piazzese, Marta Billingsley, Stefano Grosso, Marzia Cordò, Giancarlo Rutigliano, and Paolo Segat – Capri-Revolution
- Christophe Giovannoni, Julien D'Esposito, Marta Billingsley, and François Musy – Happy as Lazzaro
- Emanuele Cecere, Francesco Sabez, Paolo Testa, Silvia Moraes, Alessandro Feletti, Alessandro Quaglio, Mirko Perri, Mauro Eusepi, and Marco Saitta – Loro

=== 2020s ===
2020

- **Angelo Bonanni**, **Davide D'Onofrio**, **Mirko Perri**, **Mauro Eusepi**, and **Michele Mazzucco** – The First King: Birth of an Empire
- Daniele Maraniello, Max Gobiet, Giuseppe D'Amato, Francesco Albertelli, and Marcos Molina – 5 Is the Perfect Number
- Denny de Angelis, Simone Panetta, Stefano Grosso, and Michael Kaczmarek – Martin Eden
- Maricetta Lombardo, Luca Novelli, Daniela Bassani, Stefano Grosso, and Gianni Pallotto – Pinocchio
- Gaetano Carito, Adriano Di Lorenzo, Pierpaolo Merafino, Lilio Rosato, Gianluca Basili, and Francesco Tumminello – The Traitor

2021

- **Hidden Away**
- Bad Tales
- Hammamet
- Rose Island
- Miss Marx
