= Nastro d'Argento for Best Actress =

Italian film critics award for Best Actress

The Nastro d'Argento for Best Actress is an accolade presented annually since 1946 by the Sindacato Nazionale dei Giornalisti Cinematografici Italiani (Italian National Syndicate of Film Journalists), an association of Italian film critics.

Mariangela Melato and Margherita Buy are the record holders, with five Nastro d'Argento awards each for Best Actress received, followed by Anna Magnani, Micaela Ramazzotti, and Jasmine Trinca, four-time winners. A list of Nastro d'Argento awards for Best Actress follows.

== 1940s ==
- 1946 - Clara Calamai - The Adulteress
- 1947 - Alida Valli - Eugenie Grandet
- 1948 - Anna Magnani - Angelina
- 1949 - Anna Magnani - L'Amore

== 1950s ==
- 1950 - not awarded
- 1951 - Pier Angeli - Tomorrow Is Too Late
- 1952 - Anna Magnani - Bellissima
- 1953 - Ingrid Bergman - Europa '51
- 1954 - Gina Lollobrigida - Bread, Love and Dreams
- 1955 - Silvana Mangano - The Gold of Naples
- 1956 - not awarded
- 1957 - Anna Magnani - The Awakening
- 1958 - Giulietta Masina - Nights of Cabiria
- 1959 - not awarded

== 1960s ==
- 1960 - Eleonora Rossi Drago - Violent Summer
- 1961 - Sophia Loren - Two Women
- 1962 - not awarded
- 1963 - Gina Lollobrigida - Imperial Venus
- 1964 - Silvana Mangano - The Verona Trial
- 1965 - Claudia Cardinale - Bebo's Girl
- 1966 - Giovanna Ralli - The Escape
- 1967 - Lisa Gastoni - Wake Up and Die
- 1968 - not awarded
- 1969 - Monica Vitti - The Girl with the Pistol

== 1970s ==
- 1970 - Paola Pitagora - Unknown Woman
- 1971 - Ottavia Piccolo - Metello
- 1972 - Mariangela Melato - The Working Class Goes to Heaven
- 1973 - Mariangela Melato - The Seduction of Mimi
- 1974 - Laura Antonelli - Malicious
- 1975 - Lisa Gastoni - Bitter Love
- 1976 - Monica Vitti - Duck in Orange Sauce
- 1977 - Mariangela Melato - Caro Michele
- 1978 - Sophia Loren - A Special Day
- 1979 - Mariangela Melato - To Forget Venice

== 1980s ==
- 1980 - Ida Di Benedetto - Immacolata and Concetta: The Other Jealousy
- 1981 - Mariangela Melato - Help Me Dream
- 1982 - Eleonora Giorgi - Talcum Powder
- 1983 - Giuliana De Sio - The Pool Hustlers
- 1984 - Lina Sastri - Where's Picone?
- 1985 - Claudia Cardinale - Claretta
- 1986 - Giulietta Masina - Ginger and Fred
- 1987 - Valeria Golino - A Tale of Love
- 1988 - Ornella Muti - Me and My Sister
- 1989 - Ornella Muti - Private Access

== 1990s ==
- 1990 - Virna Lisi - Merry Christmas... Happy New Year
- 1991 - Margherita Buy - The Station
- 1992 - Francesca Neri - I thought it was love, but it was a barouche
- 1993 - Antonella Ponziani - Way South
- 1994 - Chiara Caselli - Where Are You? I'm Here
- 1995 - Sabrina Ferilli - Living It Up
- 1996 - Anna Bonaiuto - Nasty Love
- 1997
  - Iaia Forte - Luna e l'altra
  - Virna Lisi - Follow Your Heart
- 1998 - Francesca Neri - Live Flesh (in Spanish language)
- 1999 - Giovanna Mezzogiorno - Of Lost Love

== 2000s ==
- 2000 - Licia Maglietta - Bread and Tulips
- 2001 - Margherita Buy - The Ignorant Fairies
- 2002 - Valeria Golino - Respiro
- 2003 - Giovanna Mezzogiorno - The Cruelest Day and Facing Windows
- 2004 - Jasmine Trinca, Adriana Asti, Sonia Bergamasco and Maya Sansa - The Best of Youth
- 2005 - Laura Morante - Love Is Eternal While It Lasts
- 2006 - Katia Ricciarelli - The Second Wedding Night
- 2007 - Margherita Buy - Saturn in Opposition and The Caiman
- 2008 - Margherita Buy - Days and Clouds
- 2009 - Giovanna Mezzogiorno - Vincere

== 2010s ==
- 2010 - Micaela Ramazzotti, Stefania Sandrelli - The First Beautiful Thing
- 2011 - Alba Rohrwacher - The Solitude of Prime Numbers
- 2012 - Micaela Ramazzotti - A Flat for Three and The Big Heart of the Girls
- 2013 - Jasmine Trinca - There Will Come a Day and Miele
- 2014 - Kasia Smutniak - Fasten Your Seatbelts
- 2015 - Margherita Buy - Mia Madre
- 2016 - Valeria Bruni Tedeschi, Micaela Ramazzotti - Like Crazy
- 2017 - Jasmine Trinca - Fortunata
- 2018 - Elena Sofia Ricci - Loro
- 2019 - Anna Foglietta - If Life Gives You Lemons

== 2020s ==
- 2020 - Jasmine Trinca - The Goddess of Fortune
- 2021 - Teresa Saponangelo - Il buco in testa
- 2022 - Teresa Saponangelo - The Hand of God
- 2023 - Barbara Ronchi - Kidnapped
- 2024 - Micaela Ramazzotti - Felicità
- 2025 - Valeria Golino – Fuori / Romana Maggiora Vergano – The Time It Takes

== See also ==
- David di Donatello for Best Actress
- Cinema of Italy
