= David di Donatello for Best Supporting Actress =

Annual Italian film award category

- Country: Italy
- Presented by: Accademia del Cinema Italiano
- First award: 1981 (for performances in films released during the 1980/1981 film season)
- Currently held by: Emanuela Fanelli; There's Still Tomorrow (2024)
- Website: daviddidonatello.it

The David di Donatello Award for Best Supporting Actress (Italian: David di Donatello per la migliore attrice non protagonista) is a film award presented annually by the Accademia del Cinema Italiano (ACI, Academy of Italian Cinema) to recognize the outstanding performance in a supporting role of an actress who has worked within the Italian film industry during the year preceding the ceremony. It has been awarded every year since 1981.

== Winners and nominees ==
Winners are indicated in bold.

=== 1980s ===
1981

- **Maddalena Crippa** – Three Brothers (ex aequo)
- **Ida Di Benedetto** – Camera d'albergo (ex aequo)
- Laura Antonelli – Passion of Love

1982

- **Alida Valli** – The Fall of the Rebel Angels
- Piera Degli Esposti – Sweet Dreams
- Valeria D'Obici – Sweet Pea

1983

- **Virna Lisi** – Time for Loving (ex aequo)
- **Lina Polito** – Sorry for the delay (ex aequo)
- Milena Vukotic – My Friends Act III

1984

- **Elena Fabrizi** – Acqua e sapone
- Stefania Casini – Lontano da dove
- Rossana Di Lorenzo – Ballando ballando
- Anna Longhi – Il tassinaro

1985

- **Marina Confalone** – Così parlò Bellavista
- Valeria D'Obici – A Proper Scandal
- Ida Di Benedetto – Pizza Connection

1986

- **Athina Cenci** – Let's Hope It's a Girl
- Stefania Sandrelli – Let's Hope It's a Girl
- Isa Danieli – Camorra

1987

- **Lina Sastri** – The Inquiry
- Valentina Cortese – Via Montenapoleone
- Stefania Sandrelli – The Bride Was Beautiful

1988

- **Elena Sofia Ricci** – Io e mia sorella
- Vivian Wu – The Last Emperor
- Silvana Mangano – Dark Eyes
- Marthe Keller – Dark Eyes

1989

- **Athina Cenci** – Compagni di scuola
- Pupella Maggio – Cinema Paradiso
- Pamela Villoresi – Splendor

=== 1990s ===
1990

- **Nancy Brilli** – Little Misunderstandings
- Stefania Sandrelli – Dark Illness
- Pamela Villoresi – Evelina e i suoi figli
- Mariella Valentini – Red Wood Pigeon
- Amanda Sandrelli – Amori in corso

1991

- **Zoe Incrocci** – Towards Evening
- Vana Barba – Mediterraneo
- Milena Vukotic – Fantozzi alla riscossa
- Mariella Valentini – To Want to Fly
- Anne Roussel – The Yes Man
- Alida Valli – La bocca

1992

- **Elisabetta Pozzi** – Damned the Day I Met You
- Angela Finocchiaro – The Invisible Wall
- Cinzia Leone – Women in Skirts

1993

- **Marina Confalone** – The Storm Is Coming
- Alessia Fugardi – The Great Pumpkin
- Monica Scattini – Another Life

1994

- **Monica Scattini** – Sentimental Maniacs
- Regina Bianchi – Law of Courage
- Stefania Sandrelli – For Love, Only for Love

1995

- **Angela Luce** – Nasty Love
- Virna Lisi – La Reine Margot
- Ottavia Piccolo – Bidoni

1996

- **Marina Confalone** – The Second Time
- Stefania Sandrelli – The Nymph
- Lina Sastri – Strangled Lives

1997

- **Barbara Enrichi** – The Cyclone
- Edi Angelillo – La bruttina stagionata
- Andrea Ferreol – I'm Crazy About Iris Blond
- Eva Grieco – Marianna Ucrìa
- Lorenza Indovina – The Truce

1998

- **Nicoletta Braschi** – Ovosodo
- Athina Cenci – My Dearest Friends
- Marina Confalone – Notes of Love

1999

- **Cecilia Dazzi** – Marriages
- Paola Tiziana Cruciani – Kisses and Hugs
- Lunetta Savino – Marriages

=== 2000s ===
2000

- **Marina Massironi** – Bread and Tulips
- Rosalinda Celentano – The Sweet Sounds of Life
- Anna Galiena – But Forever in My Mind

2001

- **Stefania Sandrelli** – The Last Kiss
- Athina Cenci – Rosa and Cornelia
- Jasmine Trinca – The Son's Room

2002

- **Stefania Sandrelli** – Sons and Daughters
- Rosalinda Celentano – Probably Love
- Iaia Forte – Paz!

2003

- **Piera Degli Esposti** – My Mother's Smile
- Monica Bellucci – Remember Me, My Love
- Serra Yilmaz – Facing Windows
- Francesca Neri – Happiness Costs Nothing
- Nicoletta Romanoff – Remember Me, My Love

2004

- **Margherita Buy** – Caterina in the Big City
- Anna Maria Barbera – Suddenly Paradise
- Claudia Gerini – Don't Move
- Jasmine Trinca – The Best of Youth
- Giselda Volodi – Agata and the Storm

2005

- **Margherita Buy** – Manual of Love
- Erika Blanc – Sacred Heart
- Lisa Gastoni – Sacred Heart
- Giovanna Mezzogiorno – Love Returns
- Galatea Ranzi – The Life That I Want

2006

- **Angela Finocchiaro** – The Beast in the Heart
- Isabella Ferrari – The Goodbye Kiss
- Marisa Merlini – The Second Wedding Night
- Stefania Rocca – The Beast in the Heart
- Jasmine Trinca – The Caiman

2007

- **Ambra Angiolini** – Saturn in Opposition
- **Angela Finocchiaro** – My Brother is an Only Child
- Michela Cescon – Salty Air
- Francesca Neri – A Dinner for Them to Meet
- Sabrina Impacciatore – Napoleon and Me

2008

- **Alba Rohrwacher** – Days and Clouds
- Carolina Crescentini – Speak to me of love
- Isabella Ferrari – Caos calmo
- Valeria Golino – Caos calmo
- Sabrina Impacciatore – Miss F
- Paola Cortellesi – Piano, solo

2009

- **Piera Degli Esposti** – Il Divo
- Sabrina Ferilli – Your Whole Life Ahead of You
- Maria Nazionale – Gomorrah
- Micaela Ramazzotti – Your Whole Life Ahead of You
- Carla Signoris – Many Kisses Later

=== 2010s ===
2010

- **Ilaria Occhini** – Loose Cannons
- Anita Kravos – Raise Your Head
- Alba Rohrwacher – The Man Who Will Come
- Claudia Pandolfi – The First Beautiful Thing
- Elena Sofia Ricci – Loose Cannons

2011

- **Valentina Lodovini** – Welcome to the South
- Barbora Bobuľová – Love & Slaps
- Valeria De Franciscis – The Salt of Life
- Anna Foglietta – Escort in Love
- Claudia Potenza – Basilicata Coast to Coast

2012

- **Michela Cescon** – Piazza Fontana: The Italian Conspiracy
- Anita Caprioli – Heavenly Body
- Margherita Buy – We Have a Pope
- Cristiana Capotondi – Kryptonite!
- Barbora Bobuľová – Easy!

2013

- **Maya Sansa** – Dormant Beauty
- Ambra Angiolini – Viva l'Italia
- Anna Bonaiuto – Viva la libertà
- Rosabell Laurenti Sellers – Balancing Act
- Francesca Neri – A Perfect Family
- Fabrizia Sacchi – A Five Star Life

2014

- **Valeria Golino** – Human Capital
- Claudia Gerini – Blame Freud
- Paola Minaccioni – Fasten Your Seatbelts
- Galatea Ranzi – The Great Beauty
- Milena Vukotic – The Chair of Happiness

2015

- **Giulia Lazzarini** – Mia Madre
- Barbora Bobulova – Black Souls
- Micaela Ramazzotti – An Italian Name
- Valeria Golino – The Invisible Boy
- Anna Foglietta – The Legendary Giulia and Other Miracles

2016

- **Antonia Truppo** – They Call Me Jeeg
- Piera Degli Esposti – Solo
- Elisabetta De Vito – Don't Be Bad
- Sonia Bergamasco – Quo Vado?
- Claudia Cardinale – Ultima fermata

2017

- **Antonia Truppo** – Indivisible
- Valentina Carnelutti – Like Crazy
- Valeria Golino – La vita possibile
- Michela Cescon – Piuma
- Roberta Mattei – Italian Race

2018

- **Claudia Gerini** – Love and Bullets
- Sonia Bergamasco – Like a Cat on a Highway
- Micaela Ramazzotti – Tenderness
- Anna Bonaiuto – Naples in Veils
- Giulia Lazzarini – The Place

2019

- **Marina Confalone** – The Vice of Hope
- Donatella Finocchiaro – Capri-Revolution
- Nicoletta Braschi – Happy as Lazzaro
- Kasia Smutniak – Loro
- Jasmine Trinca – On My Skin

=== 2020s ===
2020

- **Valeria Golino** – 5 Is the Perfect Number
- Anna Ferzetti – Domani è un altro giorno
- Tania Garribba – The First King: Birth of an Empire
- Maria Amato – The Traitor
- Alida Baldari Calabria – Pinocchio

2021

- **Matilda De Angelis** – Rose Island
- Alba Rohrwacher – If Only
- Barbara Chichiarelli – Bad Tales
- Benedetta Porcaroli – 18 Presents

2022

- **Teresa Saponangelo** – The Hand of God
- Cristiana Dell'Anna – The King of Laughter
- Luisa Ranieri – The Hand of God
- Susy Del Giudice – I fratelli De Filippo
- Vanessa Scalera – A Girl Returned

2023

- **Emanuela Fanelli** – Dry
- Giulia Andò – Strangeness
- Daniela Marra – Exterior Night
- Giovanna Mezzogiorno – Amanda
- Aurora Quattrocchi – Nostalgia

2024

- **Emanuela Fanelli** – There's Still Tomorrow
  - Barbora Bobulova – A Brighter Tomorrow
  - Alba Rohrwacher – La chimera
  - Isabella Rossellini – La chimera
  - Romana Maggiora Vergano – There's Still Tomorrow

2025

- **Valeria Bruni Tedeschi** – The Art of Joy
  - Geppi Cucciari – Diamonds
  - Tecla Insolia – Familia
  - Jasmine Trinca – The Art of Joy
  - Luisa Ranieri – Parthenope

2026

- **Matilda De Angelis** – Fuori
  - Valeria Golino – A Brief Affair
  - Valeria Bruni Tedeschi – Five Seconds
  - Silvia D'Amico – Three Goodbyes
  - Milvia Marigliano – La grazia
  - Barbara Ronchi – Diva Futura
