= Leo Pescarolo =

Italian film producer

- Born: 1935; Kingdom of Italy
- Died: 24 May 2006 (aged 70); Rabat, Morocco
- Occupation: Film producer

Leo Pescarolo (1935 – 24 May 2006) was an Italian film producer.

The son of the actress Vera Vergani, Pescarolo entered the film industry at age 22, first as an assistant director of Gianni Franciolini and Mario Camerini, and later as a producer. He produced many films of Liliana Cavani, Giuliano Montaldo and almost all the works of Francesca Archibugi, as well as films by Federico Fellini, Francesco Rosi and Lars von Trier. In 1994 he won the Nastro d'Argento for Best Producer, for Archibugi's The Great Pumpkin, and in 1997 he won the David di Donatello in the same category for The Truce. Pescarolo was also a renowned gastronome, and he held a cooking column for a newspaper.

== Selected filmography ==
- Francesco di Assisi (1966)
- Galileo (1968)
- What Have You Done to Solange? (1972)
- Super Bitch (1973)
- Giordano Bruno (1973)
- Innocence and Desire (1974)
- Autopsy (1975)
- The Sinner (1975)
- Tell Me You Do Everything for Me (1976)
- Red Rings of Fear (1978)
- Devil in the Flesh (1986)
- The Gold Rimmed Glasses (1987)
- Mignon Has Come to Stay (1988)
- The Sleazy Uncle (1989)
- Christian (1989)
- Time to Kill (1989)
- Towards Evening (1990)
- On My Own (1991)
- The Great Pumpkin (1993)
- With Closed Eyes (1994)
- The Truce (1997)
- Shooting the Moon (1998)
- Time Regained (1999)
- Dancer in the Dark (2000)
- The Luzhin Defence (2000)
- Dogville (2003)
