= Incrocci =

Incrocci is an Italian surname. Notable people with the surname include:

- Agenore Incrocci (1919–2005), Italian screenwriter, brother of Zoe
- Zoe Incrocci (1917–2003), Italian actress and voice actress
