= Victor Cavallo =

Italian actor and underground writer (1947–2000)

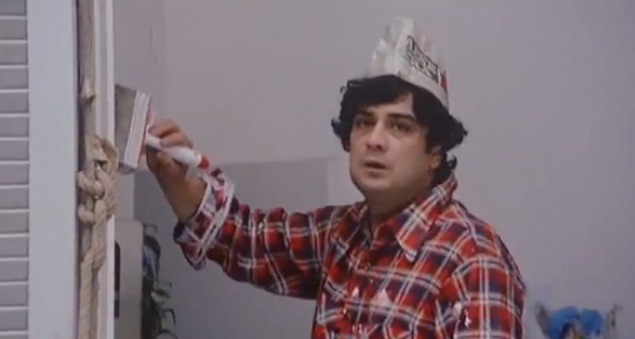
- Cavallo in W la foca, 1982
- Born: Vittorio Vitolo; 8 May 1947; Rome
- Died: 22 January 2000 (aged 52); Rome
- Years active: 1974–2000

Victor Cavallo (birth name Vittorio Vitolo; 8 May 1947 in Rome – 22 January 2000 in Rome) was an Italian actor and underground writer.

He started his acting career on stage in 1974, in cinema worked for directors such as Bernardo Bertolucci and Francesca Archibugi. He died of Hepatitis C.

== Selected filmography ==
- Tragedy of a Ridiculous Man (1981)
- W la foca (1982)
- Lontano da dove (1983)
- Io con te non ci sto più (1983)
- La piovra, season 2 (1986, TV series, 2 episodes, "Alvaro Marilli")
- Grandi magazzini (1986)
- Naso di cane (1986, TV)
- The Invisible Ones (1988)
- Burro (1989)
- Towards Evening (1990)
- Piedipiatti (1991)
- The Great Pumpkin (1993)
- Amami (1993)
- OcchioPinocchio (1994)
- Who Killed Pasolini? (1995)
- Porzûs (1997)
- Shooting the Moon (1998)
- The Ballad of the Windshield Washers (1998)
- Excellent Cadavers (1999)

== Bibliography ==
- Victor Cavallo. Ecchime. Antologia sinfonia. Stampa alternativa, 2003. ISBN 978-88-7226-735-6.
- Victor Cavallo - Storie, racconti, poesie, teatro, lettere, pensieri, disegni etc... Edizioni Ribot, marzo 2010, (ID: 8492657)
