= Stefania Sandrelli =

Italian actress (born 1946)

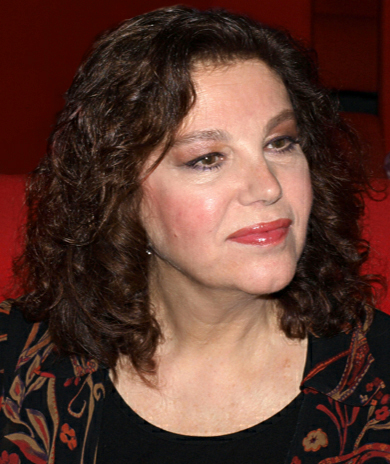
- Sandrelli in 2010
- Born: 5 June 1946 (age 80); Viareggio, Italy
- Occupation: Actress
- Years active: 1961–present
- Spouse(s): Nicky Pende (m. 1972; div. 1976)
- Partner(s): Gino Paoli (1964–1972?); Giovanni Soldati (1983–present)
- Children: 2, including Amanda Sandrelli
- Awards: David di Donatello; Best Actress; 1989 Mignon Has Come to Stay; Best Supporting Actress; 2001 The Last Kiss; 2002 Sons and Daughters; Nastro d'Argento; Best Actress; 2010 The First Beautiful Thing; Best Supporting Actress; 1980 La terrazza 1989 Mignon Has Come to Stay; 1999 The Dinner; 2001 The Last Kiss; 2006 Lifetime Achievement Award

Stefania Sandrelli (born 5 June 1946) is an Italian actress, famous for her many roles in the "Italian-style comedy" (commedia all'italiana), starting from the 1960s. She was 14 years old when she starred in Divorce Italian Style as Angela, the cousin and love interest of Ferdinando, played by Marcello Mastroianni.

== Early life ==
Sandrelli was born in Viareggio, Tuscany, into a middle-class family, the daughter of Florida and Otello Sandrelli (who died when she was eight years old), owners of a pension in Viareggio.

As a girl, Sandrelli studied ballet and learned to play the accordion. Sandrelli had a brother, Sergio, seven years older, who had a successful music career and died in 2013.

== Career ==
She debuted in cinema at the age of 15 in Mario Sequi's film Gioventù di notte. In 1960, Sandrelli won the Miss Cinema Viareggio beauty contest, then was the cover girl of the magazine Le Ore, and had `her first opportunities to make films, appearing, among others, in Luciano Salce's The Fascist. Her film career was launched by Pietro Germi with Divorce Italian Style (1961); later, she worked three more times with Germi, in Seduced and Abandoned (1964), The Climax (1967), and Alfredo, Alfredo (1970).

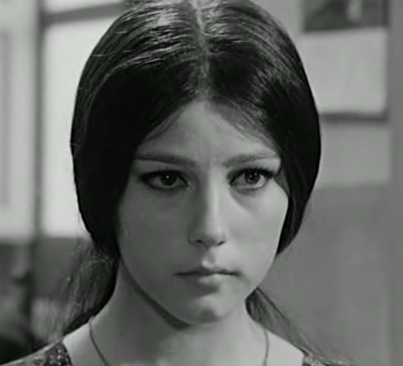
Sandrelli in Seduced and Abandoned

Sandrelli became in a short time a protagonist of the commedia all'italiana, appearing, among others, in Antonio Pietrangeli's I Knew Her Well, Mario Monicelli's Brancaleone at the Crusades, and Ettore Scola's We All Loved Each Other So Much. She also starred in several Bernardo Bertolucci's drama films, including The Conformist (1970) and 1900 (1976), and in several French productions.

In 1980, she won the Nastro d'Argento for Best Supporting Actress thanks to her performance in Ettore Scola's La terrazza. In 1983, she relaunched her career with the Tinto Brass erotic film The Key.

On 10 September 2005, she received the Golden Lion for Lifetime Achievement at the 62nd Venice International Film Festival. On 11 May 2012, she received the title of Chevalier (Knight) of the Ordre des Arts et des Lettres.

== Personal life ==
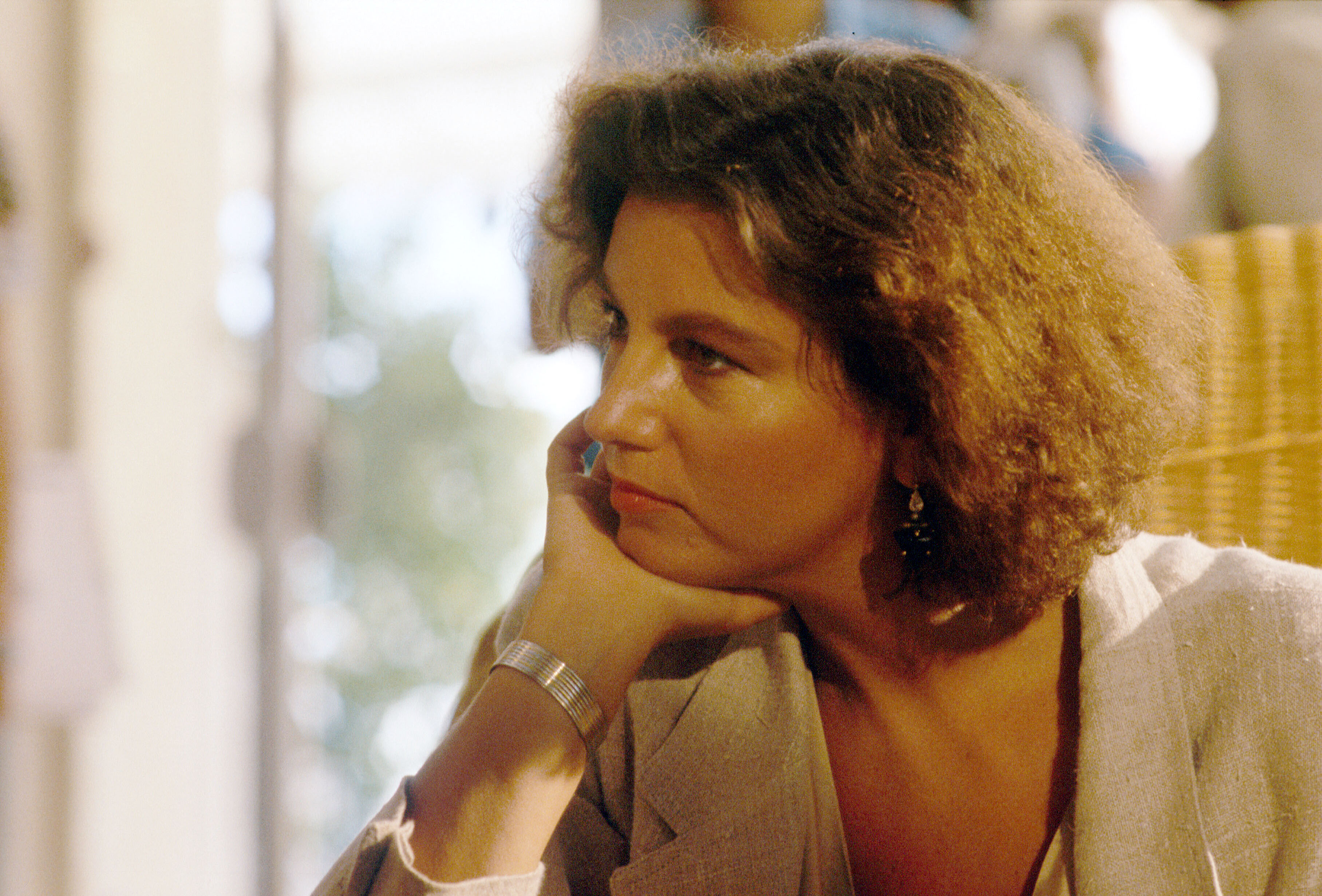
Sandrelli in 1992

Sandrelli had a long relationship with Italian singer-songwriter Gino Paoli. Their daughter Amanda Sandrelli, born in 1964, is also an actress.

== Filmography ==
=== Film ===
| Title | Year | Role | Director | Notes |
|---|---|---|---|---|
| The Fascist | 1961 | Lisa | Luciano Salce | |
| Gioventù di notte | 1961 | Claudia | Mario Sequi | |
| Divorce Italian Style | 1961 | Angela | Pietro Germi | |
| The War Lover | 1962 | Woman in the club | Philip Leacock | Uncredited |
| La bella di Lodi | 1963 | Roberta | Mario Missiroli | |
| Les vierges | 1963 | Marie-Claude | Jean-Pierre Mocky | |
| Il Fornaretto di Venezia | 1963 | Annella | Duccio Tessari | |
| The Swindlers | 1963 | Corti's client | Lucio Fulci | Segment: "Medico e fidanzata" |
| Magnet of Doom | 1963 | Angie | Jean-Pierre Melville | |
| Seduced and Abandoned | 1964 | Agnese Ascalone | Pietro Germi | |
| La chance et l'amour | 1964 | Hélène Feuillard | Eric Schlumberger | Segment: "Fiancés de la chance, Les" |
| I Knew Her Well | 1965 | Adriana Astarelli | Antonio Pietrangeli | |
| Tender Scoundrel | 1966 | Véronique | Jean Becker | |
| The Climax | 1967 | Marisa Malagugini | Pietro Germi | |
| Partner | 1968 | Clara | Bernardo Bertolucci | |
| The Bandit | 1968 | Gemma | Carlo Lizzani | |
| The Conformist | 1970 | Giulia | Bernardo Bertolucci | |
| Brancaleone at the Crusades | 1970 | Tiburzia | Mario Monicelli | |
| Un'estate con sentimento | 1970 | Sue Morley | Roberto Scarsella | |
| Black Belly of the Tarantula | 1971 | Anna | Paolo Cavara | |
| Devil in the Brain | 1972 | Sandra Garces | Sergio Sollima | |
| Alfredo, Alfredo | 1972 | Mariarosa Cavarani | Pietro Germi | |
| Somewhere Beyond Love | 1974 | Carmela Santoro | Luigi Comencini | |
| We All Loved Each Other So Much | 1974 | Luciana Zanon | Ettore Scola | |
| Police Python 357 | 1976 | Sylvia Leopardi | Alain Corneau | |
| Le voyage de noces | 1976 | Sarah | Nadine Trintignant | |
| Death Rite | 1976 | Silvia | Claude Chabrol | |
| 1900 | 1976 | Anita Furlan | Bernardo Bertolucci | |
| Strange Occasion | 1976 | Donatella | Luigi Comencini, Nanni Loy, Luigi Magni | Segment: "L'ascensore" |
| Io sono mia | 1977 | Vannina Magro | Sofia Scandurra | |
| Where Are You Going on Holiday? | 1978 | Giuliana | Mario Bolognini, Luciano Salce, Alberto Sordi | Segment: "Sarò tutta per te" |
| Traffic Jam | 1979 | Teresa | Luigi Comencini | |
| Le Maître-nageur | 1979 | Marie Mariani Poter | Jean-Louis Trintignant | |
| La verdad sobre el caso Savolta | 1979 | Teresa | Antonio Drove | |
| La terrazza | 1980 | Giovanna | Ettore Scola | |
| Desideria | 1980 | Viola | Gianni Barcelloni | |
| La disubbidienza | 1981 | Angela | Aldo Lado | |
| Eccezzziunale... veramente | 1982 | Loredana | Carlo Vanzina | |
| My Darling, My Dearest | 1982 | Clarabella | Sergio Corbucci | |
| The Key | 1983 | Teresa | Tinto Brass | |
| Vacanze di Natale | 1983 | Ivana Braghetti | Carlo Vanzina | |
| Una donna allo specchio | 1984 | Manuela | Paolo Quaregna | |
| Magic Moments | 1984 | Francesca | Luciano Odorisio | |
| Mi faccia causa | 1984 | Rosanna Bianchini | Steno | |
| Secrets Secrets | 1985 | Renata | Giuseppe Bertolucci | |
| Mamma Ebe | 1985 | Sandra Agostini | Carlo Lizzani | |
| L'attenzione | 1985 | Livia | Giovanni Soldati | |
| Let's Hope It's a Girl | 1986 | Lori Samuelli | Mario Monicelli | |
| The American Bride | 1986 | Anna | Giovanni Soldati | |
| The Family | 1987 | Beatrice | Ettore Scola | |
| D'Annunzio | 1987 | Elvira Fraternali Leoni | Sergio Nasca | |
| The Bride Was Beautiful | 1987 | Carmela | Pál Gábor | |
| The Gold Rimmed Glasses | 1987 | Mrs. Lavezzoli | Giuliano Montaldo | |
| Secondo Ponzio Pilato | 1987 | Claudia Procula | Luigi Magni | |
| The Little Devil | 1988 | Patrizia | Roberto Benigni | |
| Noyade interdite | 1988 | Winny | Pierre Granier-Deferre | |
| Stradivari | 1988 | Antonia Maria | Giacomo Battiato | |
| Mignon Has Come to Stay | 1988 | Laura | Francesca Archibugi | |
| The Sleazy Uncle | 1989 | Isabella | Franco Brusati | |
| Dark Illness | 1990 | Sylvaine | Mario Monicelli | |
| Evelina e i suoi figli | 1990 | Evelinia | Livia Giampalmo | |
| Traces of an Amorous Life | 1990 | Woman at store | Peter Del Monte | Cameo appearance |
| The African Woman | 1990 | Anna | Margarethe von Trotta | |
| Nottataccia | 1992 | Susanna | Duccio Camerini | |
| Jamón jamón | 1992 | Conchita | Bigas Luna | |
| Non chiamarmi Omar | 1992 | Monica | Sergio Staino | |
| For Love, Only for Love | 1993 | Dorotea | Giovanni Veronesi | |
| Of Love and Shadows | 1994 | Beatriz | Betty Kaplan | |
| With Closed Eyes | 1994 | Anna | Francesca Archibugi | |
| Tatiana, la muñeca rusa | 1995 | Marta | Santiago San Miguel | |
| Palermo – Milan One Way | 1995 | Franca Leofonte | Claudio Fragasso | |
| Stealing Beauty | 1996 | Noemi | Bernardo Bertolucci | |
| The Nymph | 1996 | Nunziata | Lina Wertmüller | |
| We'll Really Hurt You | 1998 | Federica Birki | Pino Quartullo | |
| The Dinner | 1998 | Isabella | Ettore Scola | |
| Marriages | 1998 | Vera | Cristina Comencini | |
| Volavérunt | 1999 | Maria Luisa of Parma | Bigas Luna | |
| Waiting for the Messiah | 2000 | Elsa | Daniel Burman | |
| The Last Kiss | 2001 | Anna | Gabriele Muccino | |
| Probably Love | 2001 | Herself | Giuseppe Bertolucci | Cameo appearance |
| Sons and Daughters | 2002 | Victoria Ramos | Marco Bechis | |
| Life as It Comes | 2003 | Mery | Stefano Incerti | |
| A Talking Picture | 2003 | Francesca | Manoel de Oliveira | |
| People of Rome | 2003 | Herself | Ettore Scola | Cameo appearance |
| I Can See It in Your Eyes | 2004 | Margherita | Valia Santella | |
| A Perfect Day | 2008 | Olimpia Tempesta | Ferzan Özpetek | |
| A Question of the Heart | 2009 | Herself | Francesca Archibugi | Cameo appearance |
| Ce n'è per tutti | 2009 | Grandma | Luciano Melchionna | |
| La Passione | 2010 | The Principal | Carlo Mazzacurati | |
| The Woman of My Dreams | 2010 | Alba | Luca Lucini | |
| The First Beautiful Thing | 2010 | Anna Michelucci | Paolo Virzì | |
| Tutta colpa della musica | 2011 | Elisa | Ricky Tognazzi | |
| One Day More | 2011 | Giacomo's mother | Massimo Venier | |
| Falchi | 2017 | Donna Arianna | Toni D'Angelo | |
| It's All About Karma | 2017 | Caterina | Edoardo Falcone | |
| Il crimine non va in pensione | 2017 | Maria | Fabio Fulco | |
| There's No Place Like Home | 2018 | Alba | Gabriele Muccino | |
| Brave ragazze | 2019 | Lucia | Michela Andreozzi | |
| We Still Talk | 2021 | Caterina Ravallini | Pupi Avati | |
| Never Too Late for Love | 2022 | Stefania | Gianni Di Gregorio | |
| Acqua e anice | 2022 | Olimpia | Corrado Ceron | |
| L'estate più calda | 2023 | Carmen | Matteo Pilati | |
| Parthenope | 2024 | Old Parthenope | Paolo Sorrentino | |

=== Television ===
| Title | Year | Role | Network | Notes |
|---|---|---|---|---|
| Lulù | 1980 | Lulù | Rai 2 | Television film |
| I racconti del maresciallo | 1984 | Miss Marzorati | Rai 1 | Episode: "Suggestion diabolique" |
| Come stanno bene insieme | 1989 | Luisa | Rai 2 | 3 episodes |
| La moglie ingenua e il marito malato | 1989 | Jolanda Kador | Canale 5 | Television film |
| Come una mamma | 1990 | Elvira Passanisi | Canale 5 | Television film |
| The Dragon Ring | 1995 | Fairy of Crystal Sword Lake | Canale 5 | Television film |
| Il maresciallo Rocca | 1996–2001 | Margherita Rizzo | Rai 1 | 16 episodes |
| Caro maestro | 1997 | Francesca Deodato | Canale 5 | 6 episodes |
| Villa Ada | 1999 | The Wife | Canale 5 | Television film |
| Piovuto dal cielo | 2000 | Pina | Rai 1 | Television film |
| Il bello delle donne | 2001–2003 | Anna Borsi | Canale 5 | 27 episodes |
| Blindati | 2003 | Lucrezia | Rete 4 | Television film |
| Sanremo Music Festival 2004 | 2004 | Herself / Guest | Rai 1 | Annual music festival |
| La tassista | 2004 | Marcella | Rai 1 | 4 episodes |
| Renzo e Lucia | 2004 | Agnese Mondella | Canale 5 | Television film (based on The Betrothed) |
| Mai storie d'amore in cucina | 2004 | Luisa | Rai 1 | Television film |
| Ricomincio da me | 2005–2006 | Teresa | Canale 5 | 4 episodes |
| Io e mamma | 2007 | Eleonora | Canale 5 | 6 episodes |
| Il generale Dalla Chiesa | 2007 | Dora Fabbo Dalla Chiesa | Canale 5 | Television film |
| Puccini | 2009 | Albina Magi | Rai 1 | Television film |
| Una grande famiglia | 2012–2015 | Eleonora Pastore | Rai 1 | 22 episodes |
| Non è stato mio figlio | 2016 | Anna Gerardi | Canale 5 | 8 episodes |
