= Zoe Incrocci =

Italian actress (1917–2003)

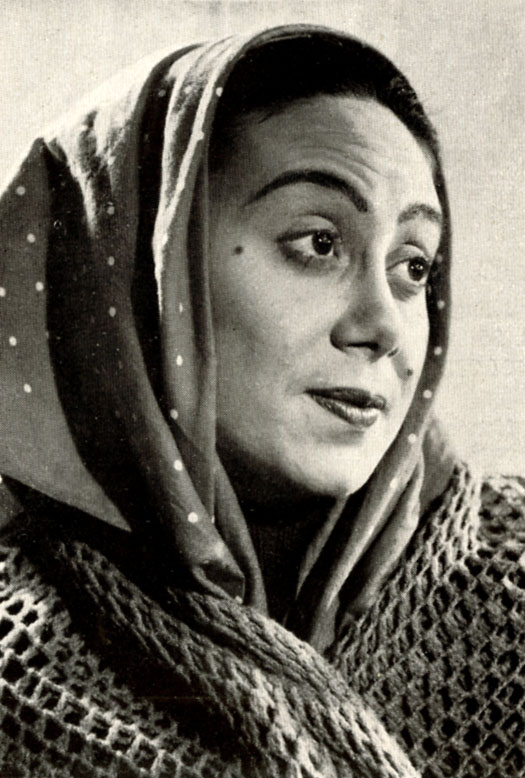
- Incrocci in 1954
- Born: 21 September 1917; Brescia, Kingdom of Italy
- Died: 6 November 2003 (aged 86); Rome, Italy
- Occupations: Actress; voice actress
- Years active: 1934–2003
- Spouse: Nino Meloni (died 1960)
- Children: 1
- Relatives: Agenore Incrocci (brother); Giorgia Meloni (granddaughter)

Zoe Incrocci (21 September 1917 – 6 November 2003) was an Italian actress and voice actress.

== Early life ==
Born in Brescia, Incrocci was the older sister of the screenwriter Agenore Incrocci.

== Career ==
She made her film debut at young age in a supporting role in the 1934 comedy film L'eredità dello zio buonanima directed by Amleto Palermi. She worked intensively in theater, radio, television and films. She was also a very active voice actress. In 1991 Incrocci received a David di Donatello for Best Supporting Actress and a Nastro d'Argento in the same category thanks to her performance in Francesca Archibugi's Towards Evening.

As a voice actress, Incrocci voiced Grandmother Willow in the Italian-language dub of Pocahontas. She reprised this role in the sequel.

== Personal life ==
Incrocci was married to the radio director Nino Meloni until his death in 1960. Through their son Francesco Meloni, Incrocci is the grandmother of Prime Minister Giorgia Meloni.

== Death ==
On 6 November 2003 Incrocci died at her home in Rome at the age of 86. Her brother died just two years later.

== Partial filmography ==
- Everybody's Woman (1934) – boarding school pupil who makes impressions (uncredited)
- Seconda B (1934) – pupil Fumasoni
- L'eredità dello zio buonanima (1934) – Sisina
- Il serpente a sonagli (1935) – boarding school pupil
- But It's Nothing Serious (1936) (uncredited)
- The Anonymous Roylott (1936)
- Nina non far la stupida (1937) – curious lady at the balcony
- La mazurka di papà (1938)
- Toto Looks for a Wife (1950) – Nannina
- Ring Around the Clock (1950) – Concettina
- Strano appuntamento (1950)
- The Steamship Owner (1951) – one of the furious women
- Perdonami! (1953) – Adele
- Passionate Song (1953) – prostitute at the train station
- Of Life and Love (1954) – Andrea's sister (segment Marsina stretta)
- We Stole a Tram (1954)
- Bravissimo (1955) – Margherita
- Destinazione Piovarolo (1955) – Ernesto's niece
- Allow Me, Daddy! (1956) – client at the butcher's
- Noi siamo le colonne (1956) – Ida (uncredited)
- Mamma sconosciuta (1956) – mother superior (uncredited)
- Rascel-Fifì (1957) – Mrs. Patrick
- Colpo gobbo all'italiana (1962)
- Dropout (1970)
- The Adventures of Pinocchio (1972, TV Mini-Series) – snail
- High Crime (1973) – Scavino's wife
- Down and Dirty (1976) – Mother Tommasina
- Towards Evening (1990) – Elvira
- Screw Loose (1999) – Mrs. De Luca
- Si fa presto a dire amore... (2000) – aunt Iole
- La collezione invisibile (2003) – Adua
- Do You Mind If I Kiss Mommy? (2003) – Bettina Patti (final film role)
