= An Italian Name =

- Directed by: Francesca Archibugi
- Starring: Alessandro Gassmann; Valeria Golino; Luigi Lo Cascio; Rocco Papaleo; Micaela Ramazzotti
- Production companies: Indiana Production Company, coproduced with Lucky Red and Motorino Amaranto
- Release date: 22 January 2015
- Running time: 94 minutes
- Country: Italy
- Language: Italian

An Italian Name (Italian: Il nome del figlio) is a 2015 Italian comedy film directed by Francesca Archibugi.

The film is based on the French play Le Prénom and its 2012 film adaptation What's in a Name?.

== Plot ==
Paolo Pontecorvo, the son of a left-wing Member of the Italian Parliament who survived the Holocaust and passed away years earlier, is a successful real estate agent known for his quick wit and love of practical jokes. He and his wife Simona, an aspiring writer, are expecting a child. During a dinner party at the home of Paolo’s sister Betta and her husband Sandro — also attended by their friend Claudio — Paolo announces, with dramatic flair, the name they’ve chosen for the baby: Benito.

The name, however, is just part of a prank. The guests, all of whom have strong emotional ties to the memory of Italy’s Fascist era, react poorly. What starts as a heated exchange of opinions quickly escalates into a full-blown confrontation, with long-standing values, personal choices, and even the guests themselves being questioned and attacked, leading to insults and hurt feelings. Each character is hiding a secret — somehow connected to the others — that threatens to unravel their relationships.

In the end, reconciliation arrives with the birth of the baby, who, in a final twist, turns out to be a girl.

== Cast ==
- Alessandro Gassmann - Paolo
- Valeria Golino - Betta
- Micaela Ramazzotti - Simona
- Luigi Lo Cascio - Sandro
- Rocco Papaleo - Claudio
- Carolina Cetroli

== Awards ==
Awards
Award	Category	Recipients and nominees	Result
70th Silver Ribbon Awards	Best Comedy	Francesca Archibugi	Nominated
70th Silver Ribbon Awards	Best Screenplay	Francesca Archibugi and Francesco Piccolo	Nominated
70th Silver Ribbon Awards	Best Actor	Alessandro Gassmann	Won
70th Silver Ribbon Awards	Best Supporting Actress	Micaela Ramazzotti	Won
70th Silver Ribbon Awards	Best Editing	Esmeralda Calabria	Nominated
60th David di Donatello Awards	Best Actor	Alessandro Gassmann	Nominated
60th David di Donatello Awards	Best Supporting Actress	Micaela Ramazzotti	Nominated
60th David di Donatello Awards	Best Supporting Actor	Luigi Lo Cascio	Nominated
60th David di Donatello Awards	Best Sound	Remo Ugolinelli	Nominated
55th Globi d'oro	Best Comedy	Francesca Archibugi	Nominated
55th Globi d'oro	Best Actress	Micaela Ramazzotti	Nominated
30th Ciak d'oro	Best Supporting Actress	Micaela Ramazzotti	Nominated
30th Ciak d'oro	Best Screenwriter	Francesca Archibugi and Francesco Piccolo	Nominated
30th Ciak d'oro	Best Cinematography	Fabio Cianchetti	Nominated
30th Ciak d'oro	Best Editing	Esmeralda Calabria	Nominated
30th Ciak d'oro	Best Sound	Remo Ugolinelli e Simone Carnesecchi	Nominated
