= Towards Evening =

1990 film

- Film poster
- Directed by: Francesca Archibugi
- Written by: Francesca Archibugi; Gloria Malatesta; Claudia Sbarigia
- Produced by: Guido De Laurentiis; Leo Pescarolo
- Starring: Marcello Mastroianni
- Cinematography: Paolo Carnera
- Edited by: Roberto Missiroli
- Release date: 21 December 1990
- Running time: 99 minutes
- Country: Italy
- Language: Italian

Towards Evening (Italian: Verso sera) is a 1990 Italian drama film directed by Francesca Archibugi. It was entered into the 17th Moscow International Film Festival. For her performance Zoe Incrocci was awarded with a David di Donatello for Best Supporting Actress and a Silver Ribbon in the same category. The film also won the David di Donatello for Best Film and the Nastro d'Argento for Best Actor (to Marcello Mastroianni).

== Cast ==
- Marcello Mastroianni as Prof. Bruschi
- Sandrine Bonnaire as Stella
- Zoe Incrocci as Elvira
- Giorgio Tirabassi as Oliviero
- Victor Cavallo as Pippo
- Veronica Lazar as Margherita
- Lara Pranzoni as Papere
- Paolo Panelli as Galliano, the hairdresser
- Giovanna Ralli as Pina
- Gisella Burinato as Stella's mother
- Pupo De Luca as Judge
- Dante Biagioni as Architect
