= A Question of the Heart =

2009 film

- Directed by: Francesca Archibugi
- Written by: Umberto Contarello; Francesca Archibugi
- Starring: Antonio Albanese; Kim Rossi Stuart; Micaela Ramazzotti; Francesca Inaudi
- Cinematography: Fabio Zamarion
- Music by: Battista Lena
- Release date: 2009
- Language: Italian

A Question of the Heart (Italian: Questione di cuore) is a 2009 Italian comedy-drama film directed by Francesca Archibugi.

== Cast ==
- Antonio Albanese: Alberto
- Kim Rossi Stuart: Angelo
- Micaela Ramazzotti: Rossana
- Alessia Fugardi: Claudia
- Francesca Inaudi: Carla
- Andrea Calligari: Airton
- Nelsi Xhemalaj: Perla
- Chiara Noschese: Loredana
- Paolo Villaggio: Renato
- Stefania Sandrelli
- Carlo Verdone
- Ascanio Celestini
- Daniele Luchetti
- Paolo Sorrentino
- Paolo Virzì

== See also ==
- List of Italian films of 2009
