= Darker Than Midnight =

- Directed by: Sebastiano Riso
- Written by: Sebastiano Riso; Stefano Grasso; Andrea Cedrola
- Produced by: Claudio Saraceni; Federico Saraceni; Jacopo Saraceni
- Starring: Vincenzo Amato; Micaela Ramazzotti
- Cinematography: Piero Basso
- Edited by: Marco Spoletini
- Music by: Michele Braga
- Distributed by: Cinecittà Luc
- Release date: 15 May 2014 (Cannes)
- Running time: 94 minutes
- Country: Italy
- Languages: Italian; English; French

Darker Than Midnight (Italian: Più buio di mezzanotte) is a 2014 Italian drama film directed by Sebastiano Riso and starring Vincenzo Amato and Micaela Ramazzotti. It was screened as part of the Critics' Week section at the 2014 Cannes Film Festival.

== Cast ==
- Vincenzo Amato as Massimo
- Micaela Ramazzotti as Rita
- Davide Capone as Davide
- Lucia Sardo as Davide's Grandmother

== Accolades ==
List of Accolades
Award / Film Festival	Category	Recipient(s)	Result
69th Nastri d'Argento	Best New Director	Sebastiano Riso	Nominated
69th Nastri d'Argento	Best Supporting Actress	Micaela Ramazzotti	Nominated
69th Nastri d'Argento	Best Editing	Marco Spoletini	Nominated
69th Nastri d'Argento	Best Score	Michele Braga	Nominated
69th Nastri d'Argento	Guglielmo Biraghi Award - Special Mention	Davide Capone	Won
