= Like Crazy (2016 film) =

- Theatrical release poster
- Directed by: Paolo Virzì
- Written by: Paolo Virzì; Francesca Archibugi
- Produced by: Marco Belardi
- Starring: Valeria Bruni Tedeschi; Micaela Ramazzotti
- Cinematography: Vladan Radovic
- Edited by: Cecilia Zanuso
- Music by: Carlo Virzì
- Distributed by: 01 Distribution
- Release dates: 14 May 2016 (Cannes); 18 May 2016 (Italy)
- Running time: 116 minutes
- Country: Italy
- Language: Italian
- Box office: € 6,060,000 (Italy only)

Like Crazy (Italian: La pazza gioia, Mad Joy) is a 2016 Italian comedy-drama film directed by Paolo Virzì, starring Valeria Bruni Tedeschi and Micaela Ramazzotti. It tells the story of two women from different backgrounds who become friends while being treated at a mental institution. It was screened in the Directors' Fortnight section at the 2016 Cannes Film Festival.

== Cast ==
- Micaela Ramazzotti - Donatella Morelli
- Valeria Bruni Tedeschi - Beatrice Morandini Valdirana
- Valentina Carnelutti - Fiamma Zappa
- Marco Messeri - Floriano Morelli
- Bob Messini - Pierluigi Aitiani
- Roberto Rondelli - Renato Corsi
- Anna Galiena - Luciana Brogi Morelli
- Tommaso Ragno - Giorgio Lorenzini
- Sergio Albelli - Torregiani
- Marisa Borini - Signora Morandini Valdirana

== Production ==
The film was produced by Lotus Production and Rai Cinema. It was shot in Tuscany and Rome. Filming began on 18 May 2015 and lasted eight weeks.

== Release ==
01 Distribution released the film in Italy on 18 May 2016.

The film's first English-speaking audience release took place in Australia on November 24, 2016 through Hi Gloss Entertainment. The film had previously played at the New Zealand Film Festival, and at the Italian Film Festival in Australia. The film was previewed to mental health professionals to generate interest and discussions on themes in the film.

== Reception ==
On review aggregator website Rotten Tomatoes, the film holds an approval rating of 84% based on 31 reviews, with an average rating of 7.5/10.

== Awards ==
| Year | Award/Festival | Category | Recipient | Result |
|---|---|---|---|---|
| 2016 | 71st Nastri d'Argento | Best Director | Paolo Virzì | Won |
| 2016 | 71st Nastri d'Argento | Best Producer | Marco Belardi | Nominated |
| 2016 | 71st Nastri d'Argento | Best Actress | Valeria Bruni Tedeschi and Micaela Ramazzotti | Won |
| 2016 | 71st Nastri d'Argento | Best Supporting Actress | Valentina Carnelutti | Nominated |
| 2016 | 71st Nastri d'Argento | Best Script | Paolo Virzì e Francesca Archibugi | Won |
| 2016 | 71st Nastri d'Argento | Best Editing | Cecilia Zanuso | Nominated |
| 2016 | 71st Nastri d'Argento | Best Scenography | Tonino Zera | Nominated |
| 2016 | 71st Nastri d'Argento | Best Costumes | Catia Dottori | Won |
| 2016 | 71st Nastri d'Argento | Best Score | Carlo Virzì | Won |
| 2016 | 29th European Film Awards | Best Actress | Valeria Bruni Tedeschi | Nominated |
| 2017 | 62nd David di Donatello Awards | Best Film | Paolo Virzì | Won |
| 2017 | 62nd David di Donatello Awards | Best Director | Paolo Virzì | Won |
| 2017 | 62nd David di Donatello Awards | Best Original Screenplay | Francesca Archibugi & Paolo Virzì | Nominated |
| 2017 | 62nd David di Donatello Awards | Best Producer | Indiana Production Rai Cinema and Motorino Amaranto | Nominated |
| 2017 | 62nd David di Donatello Awards | Best Actress | Valeria Bruni Tedeschi | Won |
| 2017 | 62nd David di Donatello Awards | Best Actress | Micaela Ramazzotti | Nominated |
| 2017 | 62nd David di Donatello Awards | Best Supporting Actress | Valentina Carnelutti | Nominated |
| 2017 | 62nd David di Donatello Awards | Best Cinematography | Vladan Radovic | Nominated |
| 2017 | 62nd David di Donatello Awards | Best Production Design | Tonino Zera | Won |
| 2017 | 62nd David di Donatello Awards | Best Costumes | Catia Dottori | Nominated |
| 2017 | 62nd David di Donatello Awards | Best Make-up | Esmé Sciaroni | Nominated |
| 2017 | 62nd David di Donatello Awards | Best Hairstyling | Daniela Tartari | Won |
| 2017 | 62nd David di Donatello Awards | Best Editing | Cecilia Zanuso | Nominated |
| 2017 | 62nd David di Donatello Awards | Best Sound | Alessandro Bianchi, Luca Novelli, Daniela Bassani, Fabrizio Quadroli, Gianni Pallotto | Nominated |
| 2017 | 62nd David di Donatello Awards | Best Score | Carlo Virzì | Nominated |
| 2017 | 62nd David di Donatello Awards | Best Original Song | Carlo Virzì | Nominated |
| 2017 | 62nd David di Donatello Awards | Youngs' David | Paolo Virzì | Nominated |
