= Io sto bene =

2020 film

- Directed by: Donato Rotunno
- Starring: Renato Carpentieri
- Release date: 16 October 2020 (Rome)
- Running time: 94 minutes
- Country: Luxembourg
- Languages: Italian; French; Luxembourgish

Io sto bene (English: I'm Fine) is a 2020 Luxembourgish drama film directed by Donato Rotunno. It was selected as the Luxembourgish entry for the Best International Feature Film at the 94th Academy Awards.

== Cast ==
- Renato Carpentieri as Antonio
- Sara Serraiocco as Leo

== See also ==
- List of submissions to the 94th Academy Awards for Best International Feature Film
- List of Luxembourgish submissions for the Academy Award for Best International Feature Film
