= Renato Carpentieri =

Italian actor, stage director, and playwright

- Born: 2 April 1943 (age 83); Savignano Irpino, Campania, Italy
- Occupation: Actor
- Height: 1.74 m (5 ft 9 in)

Renato Carpentieri (born 2 April 1943) is an Italian actor, stage director and playwright.

== Life and career ==
Born in Savignano Irpino, Avellino, Carpentieri studied architecture in Naples, where from 1965 to 1974 he was engaged in the organization and promotion of cultural events with the group Nuova Cultura. In 1975 he was co-founder of the stage company Teatro dei Mutamenti, in which he was active until 1980 as a director, an actor and a playwright.

He made his film debut in 1990, almost fifty years old, in Gianni Amelio's Porte aperte.

In 1993 he won a Nastro d'Argento for best supporting actor for his performance in Gabriele Salvatores' Puerto Escondido.

Since 1995 he has been the artistic director of the Neapolitan stage company Libera Scena Ensemble.

== Partial filmography ==
- Open Doors (1990)
- The Yes Man (1991)
- The Stolen Children (1992)
- Puerto Escondido (1992)
- Death of a Neapolitan Mathematician (1992)
- Sud (1993)
- Caro diario (1993)
- Fiorile (1993)
- Law of Courage (1994)
- The Meter Reader (1995)
- Five Stormy Days (1997)
- The Council of Egypt (2002)
- The Sweet and the Bitter (2007)
- Fort Apache Napoli (2009)
- We Believed (2010)
- The Jewel (2011)
- Heavenly Body (2011)
- Discovery at Dawn (2012)
- Leopardi (2014)
- Tenderness (2017)
- Cinderella the Cat (2017)
- The Stolen Caravaggio (2018)
- Piranhas (2019)
- Ordinary Happiness (2019)
- Hammamet (2020)
- The Life Ahead (2020)
- Io sto bene (2020)
- The Hand Of God (2021)
- Santa Lucia (2021)
- The Worst Days (2023)
- Bare Hands (2024)
