= Vivere (2019 film) =

2019 Italian drama film

- Film poster
- Directed by: Francesca Archibugi
- Written by: Francesca Archibugi; Francesco Piccolo; Paolo Virzì
- Produced by: Marco Belardi
- Starring: Micaela Ramazzotti; Adriano Giannini; Massimo Ghini; Marcello Fonte; Róisín O'Donovan; Andrea Calligari; Elisa Miccoli; Valentina Cervi; Enrico Montesano
- Cinematography: Kika Ungaro
- Edited by: Esmeralda Calabria
- Music by: Battista Lena
- Release dates: 31 August 2019 (Venice); 26 September 2019 (Italy)
- Running time: 103 minutes
- Country: Italy
- Language: Italian
- Box office: $493,072

Vivere (lit. 'To live') is a 2019 Italian drama film directed by Francesca Archibugi.

The film premiered out of competition at the 76th Venice International Film Festival on 31 August 2019.

== Cast ==
- Micaela Ramazzotti as Susi
- Adriano Giannini as Luca
- Massimo Ghini as Marinoni
- Marcello Fonte as Perind
- Róisín O'Donovan as Mary Ann
- Andrea Calligari as Pierpaolo
- Elisa Miccoli as Lucilla
- Valentina Cervi as Azzurra
- Enrico Montesano as De Sanctis

== Release ==
The film had its world premiere out of competition at the 76th Venice International Film Festival on 31 August 2019. It was released in Italy on 26 September 2019.
