= Shooting the Moon =

- Directed by: Francesca Archibugi
- Written by: Francesca Archibugi
- Produced by: Guido De Laurentiis; Leo Pescarolo
- Starring: Valeria Golino; Sergio Rubini; Stefano Dionisi
- Cinematography: Luca Bigazzi
- Edited by: Esmeralda Calabria
- Music by: Battista Lena
- Production company: 3 Emme Cinematografica
- Distributed by: Istituto Luce
- Release date: 4 September 1998
- Running time: 105 minutes
- Country: Italy
- Language: Italian

Shooting the Moon (Italian: L'albero delle pere) is a 1998 Italian drama film directed by Francesca Archibugi. It entered the competition at the 59th Venice International Film Festival, in which Niccolò Senni won the Marcello Mastroianni Award.

== Cast ==
- Valeria Golino as Silvia
- Sergio Rubini as Massimo
- Stefano Dionisi as Roberto
- Niccolò Senni as Siddharta
- Francesca Di Giovanni as Domitilla
- Victor Cavallo as Coso
