= I Killed Napoléon =

- Directed by: Giorgia Farina
- Written by: Giorgia Farina; Federica Pontremoli
- Story by: Giorgia Farina
- Produced by: Angelo Barbagallo
- Starring: Micaela Ramazzotti; Libero De Rienzo; Adriano Giannini
- Cinematography: Maurizio Calvesi
- Edited by: Esmeralda Calabria
- Music by: Andrea Farri
- Distributed by: 01 Distribution
- Release date: 26 March 2015
- Running time: 90 minutes
- Country: Italy
- Language: Italian

I Killed Napoléon (Italian: Ho ucciso Napoleone) is a 2015 black comedy film written and directed by Giorgia Farina and starring Micaela Ramazzotti.

== Plot ==
Anita is a career woman who works as a manager of the pharmaceutical company Fanelli. Cold and determined, she has decided to sacrifice relationships with others for freedom, work and power: she does not even hesitate to throw the goldfish named Napoleon into the toilet, entrusted to her by a neighbor girl who left for the holidays. Within a day, however, she discovers she is pregnant with her boss Paris, is promoted to an important position, but the next day hastily fired.

Convinced that she was fired by Paris because she was pregnant, she meditates revenge with the help of a group of women she meets in the park in front of the company: Olga, former secretary of a medical office that sells medicines, Gianna and Filippa, desperate and unemployed women and finally Enrica, a stressed-out lawyer who takes her dismissal for unjust cause to heart. Also helping her is Biagio, a shy lawyer who is secretly in love with her and who is part of the board of directors of the Fanelli company. Thanks to him, Anita discovers the thefts of money in the company against Paris and tries to exploit the news for her revenge. Thanks to the women and to Biagio, Anita succeeds in her aim and after having fired every other possible candidate as Paris's right-hand man on the board of directors she succeeds with a gimmick in getting Biagio to choose. The two finally convince Paris to confess the theft and the man is fired on the spot.

Anita is so austere due to a childhood spent in the complete indifference of her parents, both artists, who finally separated. During the pregnancy Anita and Biagio, chosen by her as a putative father towards the family, get closer and closer until they get married and give the child the name of Dora, like the beloved deceased grandmother of Biagio, who had raised him after disappearance of parents. She shows herself more and more sweet and submissive towards him, even giving up the lawsuit brought by Erica against the pharmaceutical company, because she is convinced that Biagio will take her back as soon as possible.

In reality, Biagio is a profiteer with psychiatric problems, who used Anita for his rise to power in the company. Anita can no longer do anything against him because Biagio can blackmail her for having given a slimming product not yet on the market to her friends, in particular to Gianna who felt ill and was hospitalized. Her husband blocks her money in the bank and throws her out of the house with the child. Thanks to Enrica, it turns out that Biagio lied to everyone about his parents, who are actually alive and successful managers and also about his grandmother Dora, who actually never existed.

Anita asks Paris for help and it turns out that the dismissal of the woman, which took place months before, was not his will, but it was wanted by the other members of the board of directors who had voted against her: including Biagio. With a ruse, Anita manages to enter the house from the terrace and discovers that Biagio wants to kill Gianna. Together with the other friends, Anita manages to frame Biagio while he is trying to poison her. However, Biagio manages to escape.

Months later, the situation is different: sentimentally Anita seems to be linked to Paris, while in the workplace, flanked by Olga as her new secretary and with a goldfish named Waterloo in the office, she was hired back into the company after saving her from the slimming scandal. Anita is a career woman again. Meanwhile, in Paris, Biagio puts his modus operandi into action again with another manager.

== Cast ==
- Micaela Ramazzotti as Anita
- Libero De Rienzo as Biagio
- Adriano Giannini as Paride
- Elena Sofia Ricci as Olga
- Iaia Forte as Gianna
- Thony as Enrica
- Monica Nappo as Filippa
- Bebo Storti as Fanelli
- Roberto Zibetti as Riccardo
- Pamela Villoresi as Cecilia
- Tommaso Ragno as Gabriele
- Erika Blanc as Clelia
- Luce Caponegro as Eleonora

== See also ==
- List of Italian films of 2015
