= Micaela Ramazzotti =

Italian actress

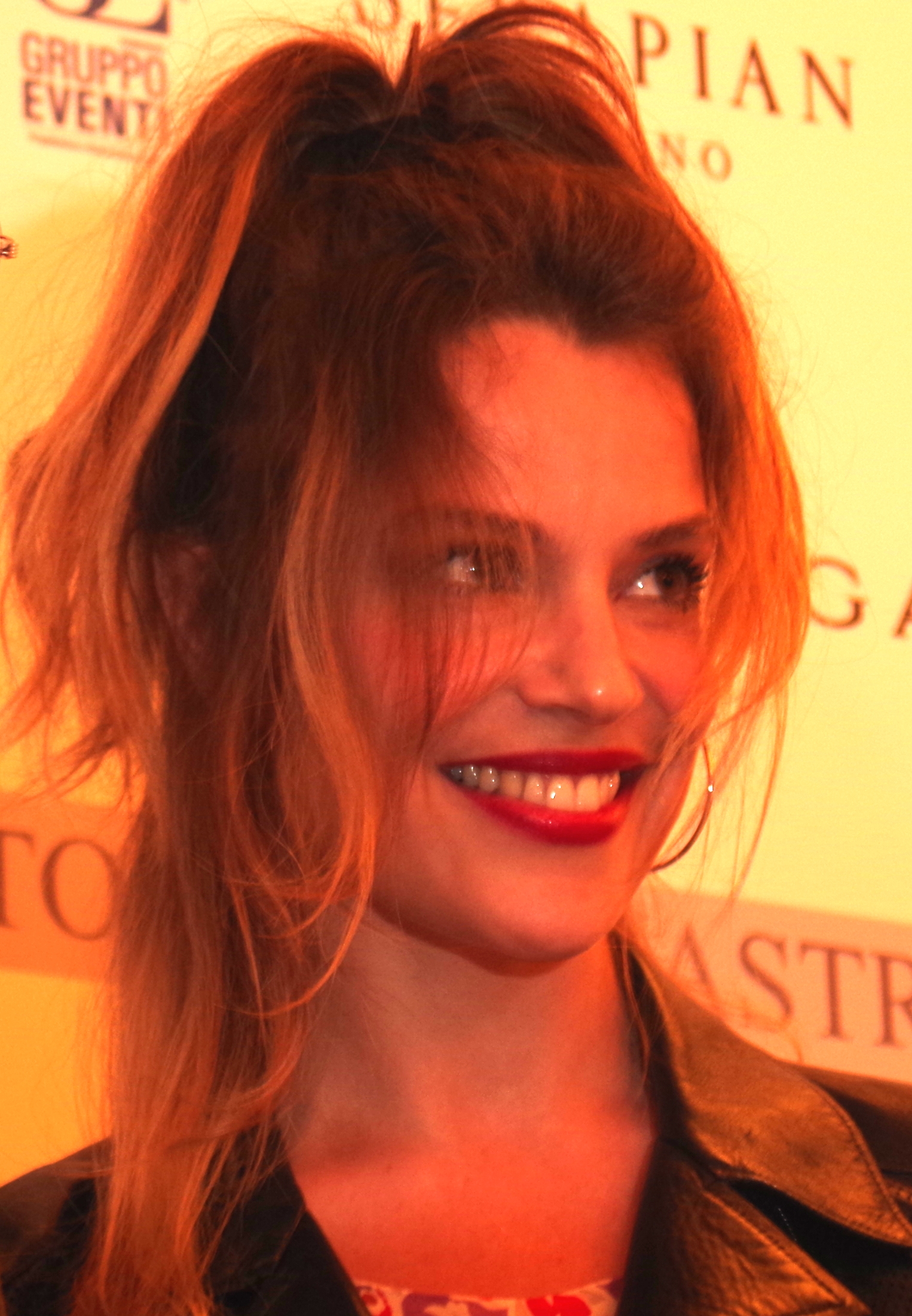
- Born: 17 January 1979 (age 47); Rome, Italy
- Occupation: Actress
- Years active: 1998–present
- Spouse: Paolo Virzì (m. 2009)
- Children: 2
- Awards: David di Donatello; Best Actress; 2010 The First Beautiful Thing Nastro d'Argento; Best Actress; 2010 The First Beautiful Thing; 2012 A Flat for Three/The Big Heart of the Girls; 2016 Like Crazy; 2024 Felicità; Best Supporting Actress; 2015 An Italian Name

Micaela Ramazzotti (born 17 January 1979) is an Italian actress. She is the recipient of numerous accolades including a David di Donatello, five Nastro d'Argento, an Italian Golden Globe and two Ciak d'oro.

Ramazzotti began her career starring in the horror comedy film Zora the Vampire (2000), before landing numerous television roles, including soap opera Cuori rubati (2003–2004), period drama series Orgoglio (2005), police procedural R.I.S.: Delitti imperfetti (2007), and medical drama series Crimini bianchi (2008–2009). Her film credits include leading roles in The First Beautiful Thing (2010), The Big Heart of Girls (2011), Those Happy Years (2013), Darker Than Midnight (2014), I Killed Napoléon (2015), An Italian Name (2015), Like Crazy (2016), The Stolen Caravaggio (2018), Vivere (2019), as well as high-profile supporting roles in Don't Make Any Plans for Tonight (2006), Your Whole Life Ahead of You (2008), A Question of the Heart (2009), A Flat for Three (2012), Tenderness (2017) and Caravaggio's Shadow (2022).

In 2023 Ramazzotti made her directional debut, with the film Felicità, presented during the 80th Venice International Film Festival, in the "Orizzonti Extra" section, winning the Audience Special Award.

== Personal life ==
She married film director, writer and producer Paolo Virzì, on 17 January 2009 in Livorno. Together they have 2 children: Jacopo (born 1 March 2010) and Anna (15 April 2013).

Ramazzotti and Virzì separated in November 2018 and reconciled in February 2019.

== Filmography ==
=== Film ===
Year	Title	Role(s)	Notes
1999	La prima volta	Norma	
1999	Vacanze di Natale 2000	Giada Covelli	
2000	Zora the Vampire	Zora	
2001	Vento di primavera	Viviana Leonardis	
2001	Commedia Sexy	Giulia	
2005	Sexum Superando – Isabella Morra	Isabella di Morra	
2006	Don't Make Any Plans for Tonight	Veronica	
2008	Your Whole Life Ahead of You	Sonia	
2009	A Question of the Heart	Rossana	
2009	Ce n'è per tutti	Isa	
2010	The First Beautiful Thing	Anna Michelucci	
2011	The Big Heart of Girls	Francesca	
2012	A Flat for Three	Gloria	
2012	Bellas Mariposas	Aleni	
2013	Planes	Rochelle (voice)	Italian voice
2013	Those Happy Years	Serena	
2014	Darker Than Midnight	Rita	
2015	An Italian Name	Simona	
2015	I Killed Napoléon	Anita Petroni	
2015	The Little Prince	The Rose (voice)	Italian voice
2016	Like Crazy	Donatella Morelli	
2017	Tenderness	Michela	
2017	A Family	Maria	
2018	The Stolen Caravaggio	Valeria Tramonti	
2018	Ti presento Sofia	Mara	
2019	Vivere	Susi Attorre	
2020	The Best Years	Gemma	
2020	Maledetta primavera	Laura Mancini	
2021	Naufragi	Maria Palusci	
2021	7 Women and a Murder	Veronica	
2022	Caravaggio's Shadow	Lena Antonietti	
2023	Felicità	Desirée Mazzoni	Directional debut; also writer
2023	Una madre	Giovanna	
2025	30 notti con il mio ex	Terry	
2025	Elena del Ghetto	Elena Di Porto	
TBA	Praticamente perfette †	TBA	Post-production

=== Television ===
Year	Title	Role(s)	Notes
1999–2000	Incantesimo	Sonia Grassi	3 episodes
2001	Don Matteo	Viviana Cosmi	Episode: "Fuori gioco"
2001	Gli occhi dell'amore	Miki	Television movie
2002–2003	Cuori rubati	Eleonora Rossi	195 episodes
2003	Blindati	Patrizia Callea	Television movie
2004–2005	Amanti e Segreti	Cristiana	8 episodes
2005	Un anno a primavera	Marta	Television movie
2005	Orgoglio	Livia	4 episodes
2006	Il mio amico Babbo Natale 2	Silvia	Television movie
2007	R.I.S.: Delitti imperfetti	Sara Melli	16 episodes
2008	L'ultimo padrino	Eleonora "Fiore" Massa	Two-parts television movie
2008–2009	Crimini bianchi	Chiara Rinaldi	12 episodes
2009	Le segretarie del sesto	Giovanna	Television movie
2023	The Good Mothers	Lea Garofalo	6 episodes
2024	Un amore	Anna Sarti	6 episodes

== Awards and nominations ==
Award	Year	Category	Nominated work	Result
63rd Venice International Film Festival	2006	Wella Prize for Best Breakthrough Actress	Don't Make Any Plans for Tonight	Won
80th Venice International Film Festival	2023	Audience Award – Orizzonti Extra Section	Felicità	Won
Bari International Film Festival	2016	Federico Fellini Platinum Award for Cinematic Excellence	Herself	Won
Bari International Film Festival	2020	Anna Magnani Award for Best Actress	The Best Years	Won
Ciak d'oro	2008	Best Supporting Actress	Your Whole Life Ahead of You	Nominated
Ciak d'oro	2009	Best Supporting Actress	A Question of the Heart	Won
Ciak d'oro	2015	Best Supporting Actress	An Italian Name	Nominated
Ciak d'oro	2017	Best Actress	Like Crazy	Won
David di Donatello	2009	Best Supporting Actress	Your Whole Life Ahead of You	Nominated
David di Donatello	2010	Best Actress	The First Beautiful Thing	Won
David di Donatello	2012	Best Actress	A Flat for Three	Nominated
David di Donatello	2015	Best Supporting Actress	An Italian Name	Nominated
David di Donatello	2017	Best Actress	Like Crazy	Nominated
David di Donatello	2018	Best Supporting Actress	Tenderness	Nominated
David di Donatello	2021	Best Actress	The Best Years	Nominated
David di Donatello	2024	Best Actress	Felicità	Nominated
David di Donatello	2024	Best Directional Debut	Felicità	Nominated
Flaiano Award	2019	Best Performance by a Female Actor	The Stolen Caravaggio	Won
Italian Golden Globe	2009	Best Actress	A Question of the Heart	Nominated
Italian Golden Globe	2014	Best Actress	Those Happy Years	Nominated
Italian Golden Globe	2015	Best Actress	An Italian Name	Nominated
Italian Golden Globe	2017	Best Actress	Tenderness	Nominated
Italian Golden Globe	2024	Best Actress	Felicità	Won
La pellicola d'oro	2017	Best Actress	Like Crazy	Won
Nastro d'Argento	2009	L'Orèal Professionel Award	A Question of the Heart	Won
Nastro d'Argento	2010	Best Actress	The First Beautiful Thing	Won
Nastro d'Argento	2012	Best Actress	A Flat for Three	Won
Nastro d'Argento	2014	Best Supporting Actress	Darker Than Midnight	Nominated
Nastro d'Argento	2015	Best Supporting Actress	An Italian Name	Won
Nastro d'Argento	2016	Best Actress	Like Crazy	Won
Nastro d'Argento	2017	Best Actress	Tenderness	Nominated
Nastro d'Argento	2019	Best Actress	The Stolen Caravaggio	Nominated
Nastro d'Argento	2020	Best Actress	The Best Years	Nominated
Nastro d'Argento	2024	Best Actress	Felicitià	Won
Nastro d'Argento	2024	Best New Director	Felicitià	Nominated
Nastro d'Argento	2025	Best Comedy Actress	30 notti con il mio ex	Nominated
