= Sud (1993 film) =

Italian drama film

- Cover of Sud
- Directed by: Gabriele Salvatores
- Written by: Franco Bernini; Angelo Pasquini; Gabriele Salvatores
- Produced by: Marco Mandelli
- Starring: Silvio Orlando
- Cinematography: Italo Petriccione
- Edited by: Massimo Fiocchi
- Distributed by: Variety Distribution
- Release date: 1993
- Running time: 86 minutes
- Country: Italy
- Language: Italian
- Box office: $3 million (Italy)

Sud, also known as South, is a 1993 Italian drama film directed by Gabriele Salvatores.

The movie won the Best Score award and was nominated for Best Original Story at the 1994 Nastro d'Argento ceremony. It also won the Best Sound award and was nominated for Best Score at the 1994 David di Donatello. For his performance, Silvio Orlando was nominated for the 1994 David di Donatello for Best Actor.

== Plot ==
During a warm springy Sunday afternoon in a small town of South Italy, the opening of the polling station is disrupted by three Italians and one Eritrean, who are unemployed, angry and armed. They threaten to occupy the polling station. They start to negotiate with the police, but eventually the four men are forced to leave.

== Cast ==
- Silvio Orlando: Ciro
- Gigio Alberti: Gianni
- Claudio Bisio: Giacomo Fiori
- Renato Carpentieri: Cannavacciuolo
- Antonio Catania: Elia
- Marco Manchisi: Michele
- Ighèzu Mussiè: Munir
- Francesca Neri: Lucia
- Antonio Petrocelli: Colonel

== Reception ==
The film performed well in the run up to Christmas grossing over $3 million in Italy.

== See also ==
- List of Italian films of 1993
