= Let's Hope It's a Girl =

1986 film by Mario Monicelli

- Italian theatrical release poster
- Italian: Speriamo che sia femmina
- Directed by: Mario Monicelli
- Screenplay by: Leo Benvenuti; Piero De Bernardi; Suso Cecchi d'Amico; Tullio Pinelli; Mario Monicelli
- Story by: Tullio Pinelli
- Produced by: Giovanni Di Clemente
- Starring: Liv Ullmann; Catherine Deneuve; Giuliana De Sio; Philippe Noiret; Giuliano Gemma; Bernard Blier; Stefania Sandrelli; Lucrezia Lante della Rovere; Paolo Hendel; Athina Cenci
- Cinematography: Camillo Bazzoni
- Edited by: Ruggero Mastroianni
- Music by: Nicola Piovani
- Production companies: Clemi Cinematografica; Producteurs Associés
- Distributed by: Compagnia Distribuzione Europea (Italy); Acteurs Auteurs Associés (France)
- Release dates: 6 February 1986 (Italy); 4 June 1986 (France)
- Running time: 120 minutes
- Countries: Italy; France
- Language: Italian

Let's Hope It's a Girl (Italian: Speriamo che sia femmina) is a 1986 comedy-drama film co-written and directed by Mario Monicelli. It stars Liv Ullmann, Catherine Deneuve, Giuliana De Sio, Philippe Noiret, Giuliano Gemma, Bernard Blier, Stefania Sandrelli, Lucrezia Lante della Rovere, Paolo Hendel and Athina Cenci. The film follows a former aristocrat who, after her divorce, runs the family villa in Tuscany with the help of her female relatives. The family's lives are thrown into turmoil when the matriarch's ex-husband suddenly returns with a renovation project.

The film earned Monicelli a David di Donatello for Best Director and a Nastro d'Argento in the same category. It also won David di Donatello Awards for Best Film, Best Supporting Actress (Cenci), Best Supporting Actor (Blier), Best Producer, Best Editing and Best Script.

== Plot ==
Elena Leonardi, a former aristocrat, is separated from her husband, Count Leonardo De Angelis, and has taken over the family's large, decaying villa in the Tuscan countryside, where she lives with housekeeper Fosca, youngest daughter Malvina and niece Martina, as well as Fosca's young daughter Immacolata and Leonardo's senile uncle Gugo, who is the only man in the house. Elena is assisted by farmer Guido Nardoni, who has long been in love with her. Claudia, Elena's sister and Martina's mother, is a famous actress who lives in Rome. Elena's eldest daughter, Franca, is a university student in Siena.

Leonardo, who is riddled with debts, visits the villa from Rome with a plan to renovate a disused spa owned by his family and transform it into a modern facility. Franca also comes to visit with her boyfriend Mario Giovannini, an eccentric dialectologist. In despair, Leonardo asks Elena for a large sum of money to complete his project, which is being financed by his mistress. Elena refuses to give Leonardo any money due to his history of failing business ideas, but invites him to stay temporarily at the villa to avoid his creditors.

While visiting a scenic overlook with Uncle Gugo the next day, Leonardo decides to return to Rome. Leonardo asks Gugo for assistance while reversing his vintage Mustang convertible on the edge of a cliff, but Gugo is distracted with releasing a carrier pigeon, causing Leonardo to back his car off the cliff. That night, Gugo returns to the villa but fails to inform the other family members of Leonardo's car accident, as they are preoccupied with locating Martina and Immacolata, who have secretly run away to a Ron concert in Siena. Claudia joins the family at the police station, and Nardoni eventually finds the girls, who are brought back home.

The next day, a police officer informs the family of Leonardo's death. At the funeral, the family meets Lori Samuelli, Leonardo's young mistress and one of his creditors, and Franca reveals her plans to marry Mario and move to Rome. Back at the villa, Franca and Malvina both blame Elena for Leonardo's death due to not giving him money; Claudia, feeling guilty about Martina's running away, resolves to take her home to Rome; and Fosca plans to join her husband, who emigrated to Australia many years earlier. Elena intends to sell the villa to pay off Leonardo's debts and move to Rome with Malvina.

The following day, Elena and Nardoni trick Uncle Gugo into checking into a retirement home where Nardoni's mother lives. Later, Nardoni offers to buy the villa and marry Elena so she can stay; although Elena is not interested in a marriage of convenience, she agrees to sell the property. One night, Gugo flees the retirement home and makes his way back to the villa. The women eventually reunite at the villa: Fosca learns that her husband has another family in Australia; Franca, pregnant by Mario, has left him; and Claudia has ended her affair with her married lover, Cesare Molteni, who made advances towards Malvina during the latter's visit to her aunt. Elena tells Nardoni she has decided against selling the villa.

As the women and Uncle Gugo gather for dinner, Lori comes to the villa to collect her payment, and Elena tells her that she has decided not to sell the villa, but assures her that she intends to pay her back. Elena also invites Lori to stay temporarily at the villa. When Franca announces she plans to keep her baby, Elena quips, "Let's hope it's a girl."

== Cast ==
- Liv Ullmann as Elena
- Catherine Deneuve as Claudia
- Giuliana De Sio as Franca
- Philippe Noiret as Count Leonardo
- Giuliano Gemma as Guido Nardoni
- Bernard Blier as Uncle Gugo
- Stefania Sandrelli as Lori Samuelli
- Lucrezia Lante della Rovere as Malvina
- Paolo Hendel as Mario Giovannini
- Athina Cenci as Fosca
- Francesca Calò as Martina
- Simona Cera as Immacolata
- Nuccia Fumo as Rosa Nardoni
- Carlo Monni as truck driver
- Paul Muller as priest
- Adalberto Maria Merli as Cesare Molteni (uncredited)
