= Sons and Daughters (film) =

2001 film by Marco Bechis

- Directed by: Marco Bechis
- Written by: Lara Fremder; Marco Bechis
- Starring: Carlos Echevarría; Julia Sarano; Stefania Sandrelli; Enrique Piñeyro
- Edited by: Jacopo Quadri
- Music by: Jacques Lederlin
- Release date: 2001
- Running time: 92 minutes
- Countries: Argentina; Italy
- Language: Spanish

Sons and Daughters (Spanish: Figli/Hijos) is a 2001 Argentine drama film directed by Marco Bechis. Two years after Olympic Garage, this is the second film of Bechis focused on the Argentina's Dirty War.

== Cast ==
- Carlos Echevarría as Javier Ramos
- Julia Sarano as Rosa Ruggeri
- Stefania Sandrelli as Victoria Ramos
- Enrique Piñeyro as Raul Ramos
- Antonella Costa as woman in labour

== Awards ==
- 2002: David di Donatello for Best Supporting Actress to Stefania Sandrelli
