= Io con te non ci sto più =

- Directed by: Gianni Amico
- Written by: Francesco Tullio Altan; Gianni Amico; Enzo Ungari
- Produced by: Bernardo Bertolucci
- Starring: Monica Guerritore; Victor Cavallo
- Cinematography: Antonio Nardi
- Edited by: Roberto Perpignani
- Music by: Fernando Falcone
- Release date: 1983
- Language: Italian

Io con te non ci sto più (also known as I'm Not Living With You Anymore, Enough Is Enough, Happy End and I'm Not Staying With You Anymore) is a 1983 Italian romantic comedy-drama film written and directed by Gianni Amico and starring Monica Guerritore and Victor Cavallo. It was screened in the "Venice Night" section at the 40th edition of the Venice International Film Festival.

== Cast ==
- Monica Guerritore as Clara
- Victor Cavallo as Marco
- Coralla Maiuri as Tina
- Claudio Remondi
- Carlo Monni
- Silvio Vannucci

== See also ==
- List of Italian films of 1983
