= The Stolen Caravaggio =

2018 drama film

- Directed by: Roberto Andò
- Screenplay by: Roberto Andò; Angelo Pasquini
- Produced by: Angelo Barbagallo
- Starring: Micaela Ramazzotti; Renato Carpentieri; Laura Morante; Jerzy Skolimowski; Alessandro Gassmann
- Cinematography: Maurizio Calvesi
- Edited by: Esmeralda Calabria
- Music by: Marco Betta
- Distributed by: 01 Distribution
- Release date: 2018
- Language: Italian

The Stolen Caravaggio (Italian: Una storia senza nome, lit. 'A Story With No Name') is a 2018 Italian drama film co-written and directed by Roberto Andò.

The film deals with the robbery of Caravaggio's Nativity with Saint Francis and Saint Lawrence, and premiered out of competition at the 75th edition of the Venice Film Festival. It had its North-American premiere at the 54th Chicago International Film Festival.

== Cast ==
- Micaela Ramazzotti as Valeria Tramonti
- Renato Carpentieri as Alberto Rak
- Laura Morante as Amalia Roberti
- Jerzy Skolimowski as Jerzy Kunze
- Alessandro Gassmann as Alessandro Pes
- Antonio Catania as Massimo Vitelli
- Gaetano Bruno as Diego Spadafora
- Marco Foschi as Riccardo
- Martina Pensa as Irene
- Renato Scarpa as Arturo Onofri
- Silvia Calderoni as Romeo Agate
- Giovanni Martorana as Mario
- Filippo Luna as Seminerio
- Paolo Graziosi as Nemi
- Michele Di Mauro as Augusto Trezzi
