= Bar Joseph =

- Theatrical release poster
- Italian: Bar Giuseppe
- Directed by: Giulio Base
- Written by: Giulio Base
- Starring: Ivano Marescotti; Virginia Diop; Michele Morrone
- Release date: 2019
- Running time: 95 minutes
- Country: Italy
- Language: Italian

Bar Joseph (Italian: Bar Giuseppe) is a 2019 Italian drama film written and directed by Giulio Base. It stars Ivano Marescotti & Virginia Diop.

== Synopsis ==
Giuseppe, co-owner of a gas station and bar in Puglia, loses his wife abruptly. Facing a lack of support from his adult children for the bar management, he hires Bikira, an eighteen-year-old girl who recently arrived in Italy with adoptive parents. Despite the substantial age gap, Giuseppe and Bikira marry, causing a scandal in their provincial town. Subsequently, Bikira informs Giuseppe of her pregnancy, asserting that she has not had any physical contact with a man.

== Cast ==
The actors participating in this film are:

- Ivano Marescotti as Giuseppe
- Michele Morrone as Luigi

== Production ==
The film was largely shot in Puglia, Bitonto, with scenes also in the territories between Terlizzi, Palo del Colle and Canosa di Puglia in the village of Loconia, up to Lavello in Basilicata. Filming took place between November and December 2018.

== Release ==
Due to the COVID-19 pandemic, a theatrical release could not be properly scheduled. The film was presented in 2019 at the Rome Film Fest, was distributed and made available by Rai Cinema exclusively on RaiPlay starting May 28, 2020.
