= Marriages (1998 film) =

- Directed by: Cristina Comencini
- Produced by: Aurelio De Laurentiis
- Starring: Diego Abatantuono; Francesca Neri; Stefania Sandrelli; Claude Brasseur
- Cinematography: Roberto Forza
- Music by: Aldo De Scalzi; Paul Racer; Matt Son
- Release date: 1998
- Running time: 94 minutes
- Country: Italy
- Language: Italian

Marriages (Italian: Matrimoni) is a 1998 Italian romantic comedy film directed by Cristina Comencini. For her performance Cecilia Dazzi won the David di Donatello for best supporting actress.

== Plot ==
Giulia is getting everything ready for the Christmas Eve party she always hosts for her family, helped by her unmarried sister Sandra. Her husband Paolo keeps out of the way, going for a game of tennis when he finishes work. It is Giulia who has to go to the railway station to collect her brother Sergio and his wife Lucia, whose relationship is on the brink. Instead of greeting them, on an impulse she jumps on a train that takes her to her birthplace of Trani.

A tense party continues without Giulia, who has bumped into Fausto, an old flame, while Paolo left on his own is being comforted by Sandra. For the New Year, everybody else comes down to Trani, where Giulia's separated parents are having a secret tryst in a hotel closed for the winter. When Fausto and Giulia sneak into an empty bedroom there, they are spotted by her mother and Giulia's virtue is preserved. While Paolo reconciles with Giulia, Sandra and Fausto discover they have a lot in common. Amid all this pairing off, Sergio and Lucia resolve to turn over a new leaf.

== Cast ==
- Diego Abatantuono as Paolo
- Francesca Neri as Giulia
- Stefania Sandrelli as Vera
- Claude Brasseur as Alessio
- Paolo Sassanelli as Fausto
- Cecilia Dazzi as Sandra
- Lunetta Savino as Lucia
- Emilio Solfrizzi as Sergio
- Claire Keim as Catherine
- Gigio Alberti
- Fabio De Luigi
