= Cinderella the Cat =

2017 film by Alessandro Rak, Ivan Cappiello, Marino Guarnieri and Dario Sansone

- Theatrical release poster
- Italian: Gatta Cenerentola
- Directed by: Alessandro Rak; Ivan Cappiello; Marino Guarnieri; Dario Sansone
- Screenplay by: Alessandro Rak; Ivan Cappiello; Corrado Morra; Marianna Garofalo; Italo Scialdone; Marino Guarnieri; Dario Sansone
- Story by: Ivan Cappiello; Marco Galli; Luciano Stella
- Produced by: Luciano Stella; Maria Carolina Terzi; Mario Luchetti
- Starring: Massimiliano Gallo; Maria Pia Calzone; Alessandro Gassmann; Renato Carpentieri; Mariano Rigillo; Ciro Priello
- Edited by: Alessandro Rak; Marino Guarnieri
- Music by: Antonio Fresa; Luigi Scialdone
- Production companies: Mad Entertainment; Rai Cinema; Big Sur; Sky Dancers; Tramp Ltd; O' Groove; Gatta Cenerentola
- Distributed by: Videa
- Release dates: 6 September 2017 (Venice); 14 September 2017 (Italy)
- Running time: 86 minutes
- Country: Italy
- Language: Italian
- Box office: $359,833

Cinderella the Cat (Italian: Gatta Cenerentola) is a 2017 Italian adult animated crime drama film directed by Alessandro Rak, Ivan Cappiello, Marino Guarnieri and Dario Sansone, loosely based on the Giambattista Basile's fable of the same name and Roberto De Simone's musical La Gatta Cenerentola. The plot is set in a decaying future Naples and concerns a mysterious mute teenager called Mia, who struggles to escape from the Camorra boss Salvatore Lo Giusto and Mia's vicious stepmother Angelica.

The film had its world premiere in the Horizons section of the 74th Venice International Film Festival, and was released theatrically in Italy on 14 September 2017 by Videa. It was among the fourteen films shortlisted to be the Italian entry for the Academy Award for Best Foreign Language Film at the 90th Academy Awards, but was not selected.

== Plot ==
Vittorio Basile is a rich scientist and shipowner; one of his ships, the Megaride, is a high-tech ship that records everything that happens inside and shows it in the form of holograms. Basile wants to turn the harbor of Naples into a huge technological harbor and the Megaride into a digital database that keeps a memory of everyone that steps inside the ship.

Basile has a 3-year-old daughter, Mia, and he is going to marry Angelica, mother of five daughters and a young son Luigi. On the day of the wedding, Salvatore Lo Giusto, known as O' Re (The King), an ambitious drug lord and secret lover of Angelica, kills Basile. Mia becomes aphonous after this shock and is left under the protection of her stepmother Angelica, since Mia is the only heir of the Megaride and, according to Lo Giusto's plan, she is going to sign after her 18th birthday a contract that will give all her inheritance to Lo Giusto. Mia lives with Angelica and her cruel daughters that treat her like a servant and call her Gatta Cenerentola (Cinderella the Cat) because of her habit of crawling inside the ducts of the ship like a cat. The Megaride remains in the harbor for 15 years and Angelica turns it into a sleazy brothel. The dream of Lo Giusto and Angelica is to turn the city of Naples, into a capital city of crime and drug recycling.

Primo Gemito, formerly Basile's bodyguard, tries to find evidence to frame Lo Giusto, but he is injured and almost killed by Angelica's daughters who work as prostitutes in the brothel. Primo is saved by Mia, who was under his protection when she was a baby and they both recognize each other even though 15 years have passed. Thanks to Mia, Primo finds all the evidence he needs, including images of the hold of the ship where Lo Giusto has been throwing the corpses of his enemies. Primo wants to bring Mia away from the Megaride, but she refuses to leave her father's ship.

Meanwhile, Lo Giusto comes back to Naples on Mia's 18th birthday, after a long absence: when Mia is going to sign the transfer of property, Lo Giusto and Angelica will be free to marry after killing Mia. However, Lo Giusto confesses that he has never loved Angelica and he doesn't want to marry her since she has grown very old and plans instead to marry Mia, this caused Anna to throw her headphones and tearing her black sleeveless shirt, after she tears her black sleeveless shirt, Angelica grounded the poor Mia for disobeying her and told her that she will not move until the song begins. Lo Giusto transfers Mia to the suite Basile gave to Angelica when they were engaged and gives her beautiful dresses and shoes. At first Mia is flattered by this kindness, but before the ceremony she sees a hologram that shows the moment when Lo Giusto killed her father. Shattered, Mia escapes through the ducts chased by Lo Giusto's henchmen.

Primo is leading a group of policemen to arrest Lo Giusto, even though Lo Giusto has already cleaned up the hold of the ship after a tip and has threatened to kill him. Primo is not afraid to die, since he wants to restore Naples and save Mia from marrying him. Meanwhile, Angelica understands that Lo Giusto wants to marry Mia instead of her and asks her daughters to kill her before the ceremony.

When the stepsisters finally find Mia to try to kill her, they are ambushed by Lo Giusto's henchmen. At this point, a gunfight begins between Angelica's daughters and the henchmen and it ends with a massacre: all Angelica's daughters are killed and the last of Lo Giusto's henchman is shot dead by Angelica herself. Looking at the corpses of all her children, Angelica understands that all that happened was not Mia's fault, but her own, since she has betrayed Basile, the only man that really loved her, and then let Lo Giusto use her for his own purposes. Angelica decides to spare Mia and goes to the engine room to blow up the ship and everyone inside, but first she asks Mia to go inside her suite and free a blackbird that Basile gave her during their engagement and then leave the ship before the explosion. Angelica starts the countdown and, since she wants to die as well, sits on a balcony while she smokes a cigarette.

Primo manages to give the alarm, allowing everyone to leave the Megaride in time, while Lo Giusto tries to take Mia with him. The girl, knowing that she is standing in front of the man who killed her father, starts beating Lo Giusto on his head and face and is stopped only when Primo arrives and tells her to run away. Primo and Mia manage to leave the ship just a second before the explosion, while Lo Giusto is left bleeding to die in one of the hallways.

== Voice cast ==
- Massimiliano Gallo as Salvatore Lo Giusto
- Maria Pia Calzone as Angelica Carannante
- Alessandro Gassmann as Primo Gemito
- Mariano Rigillo as Vittorio Basile
- Renato Carpentieri as Commissioner
- Ciro Priello as Luigi
- Federica Altamura as Anna
- Chiara Baffi as Barbara
- Francesca Romana Bergamo as Carmen and Luisa
- Anna Trieste as Sofia
- Gino Fastidio as James

== Reception ==
=== Critical response ===
On review aggregator website Rotten Tomatoes, the film holds an approval rating of 67%, based on 6 reviews, and an average rating of 5.5/10. On Metacritic, the film has a weighted average score of 55 out of 100, based on 4 critics, indicating "mixed or average reviews".

Jay Weissberg from Variety praised the film, saying, "with its slick, creative animation, and enjoyable tunes, Cinderella the Cat is one of the best Italian animated films of recent years".

=== Accolades ===
- David di Donatello Awards (2018)
  - David di Donatello for Best Producer to Luciano Stella and Maria Carolina Terzi
  - David di Donatello for Best Visual Effects
  - Nomination for David di Donatello for Best Film
  - Nomination for David di Donatello for Best Score to Antonio Fresa and Luigi Scialdone
  - Nomination for David di Donatello for Best Song to Dario Sansone and Foja for A chi appartieni
  - Nomination for David di Donatello for Best Sound to Giancarlo Rutigliano, Andrea Cutillo, and Giorgio Molfini
  - Nomination for David Giovani Award
