= Felicità (film) =

2023 Italian comedy-drama film

- Directed by: Micaela Ramazzotti
- Written by: Isabella Cecchi; Alessandra Guidi; Micaela Ramazzotti
- Produced by: Davide Boschin
- Starring: Micaela Ramazzotti
- Cinematography: Luca Bigazzi
- Edited by: Jacopo Quadri
- Music by: Carlo Virzì
- Release dates: September 1, 2023 (Venice); September 21, 2023 (Italy)
- Running time: 104 minutes
- Country: Italy
- Language: Italian

Felicità (Happiness) is a 2023 Italian comedy-drama film co-written and directed by Micaela Ramazzotti, at her feature film debut. It premiered at the 80th Venice International Film Festival.

== Cast ==
- Micaela Ramazzotti as Desirée Mazzoni
- Matteo Olivetti as Claudio Mazzoni
- Max Tortora as Max Mazzoni
- Anna Galiena as Floriana Mazzoni
- Sergio Rubini as Bruno
- Beatrice Vendramin as Ludovica
- Marco Cocci as Riccardo Montero
- Massimiliano Franciosa as Luciano
- Florence Guérin as Gertrud Ferrero
- Isabella Cecchi as Psichiatrist
- Giovanni Veronesi as Himself

== Production ==
Ramazzotti cited Ken Loach as the main inspiration for her directorial debut. The film was produced by Leone Film Group, the production company of Sergio Leone's daughter and son Raffaella and Andrea, with Lotus Production. It was shot between Rome and Fiumicino.

== Release ==
The film premiered at the 80th Venice International Film Festival, in the Orizzonti Extra section, where it won the Audience Award. It was released in Italian cinemas on 21 September 2023.

== Reception ==
For this film Ramazzotti was nominated for two David di Donatello awards, both in the best new director and best actress categories.
