= With Closed Eyes =

1994 film by Francesca Archibugi

- Directed by: Francesca Archibugi
- Starring: Stefania Sandrelli; Marco Messeri; Debora Caprioglio; Alessia Fugardi; Fabio Modesti; Gabriele Bocciarelli; Ángela Molina; Laura Betti
- Cinematography: Giuseppe Lanci
- Edited by: Roberto Perpignani
- Music by: Battista Lena
- Release date: 22 December 1994
- Country: Italy
- Language: Italian

With Closed Eyes (Italian: Con gli occhi chiusi) is a 1994 Italian drama film written and directed by Francesca Archibugi. It is based on the novel with the same name written by Federigo Tozzi.

For his performance Marco Messeri won the Nastro d'Argento for best supporting actor.

== Cast ==
- Debora Caprioglio: Ghisola, adult
- Marco Messeri: Domenico
- Stefania Sandrelli: Anna
- Alessia Fugardi: Ghisola, young age
- Gabriele Bocciarelli: Pietro, young age
- Ángela Molina: Rebecca
- Fabio Modesti: Pietro, adult
- Sergio Castellitto: Alberto
- Margarita Lozano: Masa
- Laura Betti: Beatrice
- Nada: singer

== Reception ==
Despite its Christmas release, the film failed to find an audience.
