= A Family (2017 film) =

2017 film

- Film poster
- Directed by: Sebastiano Riso
- Written by: Sebastiano Riso
- Starring: Micaela Ramazzotti; Patrick Bruel
- Release dates: 4 September 2017 (Venice); 28 September 2017 (Italy)
- Running time: 97 minutes
- Country: Italy
- Language: Italian

A Family (Italian: Una famiglia) is a 2017 Italian drama film directed by Sebastiano Riso. It was screened in the main competition section of the 74th Venice International Film Festival.

== Cast ==
- Micaela Ramazzotti as Maria
- Patrick Bruel as Vincenzo
- Fortunato Cerlino as Dr. Minerva
- Marco Leonardi as Pietro
- Matilda De Angelis as Stella
- Ennio Fantastichini as Giorgio

== Reception ==
=== Critical response ===
On review aggregator website Metacritic, which assigns a rating to reviews, the film has a weighted average score of 31 out of 100, based on 4 critics, indicating "generally unfavorable reviews".
