= Tenderness (2017 film) =

- Film poster
- Directed by: Gianni Amelio
- Screenplay by: Alberto Taraglio
- Story by: Gianni Amelio; Alberto Taraglio; Chiara Valerio
- Based on: The Temptation to Be Happy by Lorenzo Marone
- Produced by: Agostino Saccà; Giuseppe Saccà; Maria Grazia Saccá
- Starring: Elio Germano; Giovanna Mezzogiorno; Micaela Ramazzotti; Greta Scacchi; Renato Carpentieri
- Cinematography: Luca Bigazzi
- Edited by: Simona Paggi
- Music by: Franco Piersanti
- Distributed by: 01 Distribution
- Release date: 22 April 2017
- Running time: 103 minutes
- Country: Italy
- Language: Italian

Tenderness (also titled La tenerezza and Tenerezza: Holding Hands) is a 2017 Italian drama film directed by Gianni Amelio and starring Elio Germano, Giovanna Mezzogiorno, Micaela Ramazzotti, Greta Scacchi and Renato Carpentieri. It is based on the novel The Temptation to Be Happy by Lorenzo Marone.

== Plot ==
Lorenzo, an elderly retired lawyer, has just had a heart attack but in the hospital he refuses to speak with his children Elena and Saverio, with whom he has no relationship. The only relative with whom he has affectionate relations is Francesco, the son Elena had while studying in Egypt to become an interpreter. Back home, Lorenzo makes the acquaintance of Michela, his new neighbor, who moved with her husband Fabio and their two children to the apartment next to his, while he was in hospital.

Lorenzo grows fond of this family from the north, especially Michela who invites him to smile more, proving to be an affectionate presence in his solitary life. Lorenzo soon discovers that Fabio, a neurotic engineer, is unable to bond with his children, just like him. One Sunday, speaking with Michela, Lorenzo confides that when his children were children, he loved them very much, but once they grew up he was completely detached from them. Michela speculates that it is a psychological defense not to feel pain in seeing them suffer. Point on the spot, Lorenzo leaves the house.

In the evening, on his return, the elderly lawyer discovers that Fabio has committed a massacre by killing his children and committing suicide. The only survivor is Michela who is hospitalized dying at the hospital. Posing as her father, Lorenzo visits her constantly. During this period in which he visits Michela daily, Lorenzo meets Aurora, Fabio's mother, already paranoid and unable to manage relationships with others since he was a child, and returns to find his old lover Rossana, whose relationship now ended seems to have led to the starvation of Lorenzo's wife.

Discovered that he is not Michela's father, Lorenzo receives a restraining order and it comes to light that during the exercise of his profession, Lorenzo had won all the cases, but had repeatedly cheated the state by putting himself at the service of false invalids or for scams. One morning Michela dies and Lorenzo moves away from home causing agitation to his daughter Elena, who despite her father's silence had always worried about him hoping for a reconciliation.

A few days later, Lorenzo goes to court, where he witnesses his daughter's work as an interpreter during a trial. Once the session is over, Elena leaves the court and finds her father sitting on a bench. Silently she sits beside her and he, without saying anything, shakes her hand.

== Cast ==
- Renato Carpentieri as Lorenzo
- Micaela Ramazzotti as Michela
- Elio Germano as Fabio
- Giovanna Mezzogiorno as Elena
- Greta Scacchi as Aurora
- Arturo Muselli as Saverio
- Giuseppe Zeno as Giulio
- Maria Nazionale as Rossana
