= Dormant Beauty =

2012 film

Dormant Beauty (Bella addormentata)
- Film poster
- Directed by: Marco Bellocchio
- Written by: Marco Bellocchio; Veronica Raimo; Stefano Rulli
- Produced by: Riccardo Tozzi; Giovanni Stabilini; Marco Chimenz; Fabio Conversi (co-producer); Fabio Massimo Cacciatori (executive producer); Franco Bevione (executive producer)
- Starring: Toni Servillo; Isabelle Huppert; Alba Rohrwacher; Michele Riondino; Maya Sansa; Pier Giorgio Bellocchio; Gianmarco Tognazzi; Fabrizio Falco; Brenno Placido; Roberto Herlitzka
- Cinematography: Daniele Ciprì
- Edited by: Francesca Calvelli
- Music by: Carlo Crivelli
- Release dates: 5 September 2012 (Venice); 6 September 2012 (Italy)
- Running time: 115 minutes
- Countries: Italy; France
- Language: Italian

Dormant Beauty (Italian: Bella addormentata) is a 2012 Italian drama film directed by Marco Bellocchio and starring Toni Servillo and Isabelle Huppert. The film was selected to compete for the Golden Lion at the 69th Venice International Film Festival. For this film Maya Sansa won the David di Donatello for Best Supporting Actress.

== Plot ==
The film revolves around the true story of Eluana Englaro, a girl felt into an irreversible coma in 1992 following a car accident and deemed incurable. After long years of struggle, her parents opted to euthanize her, asking the authorization to the competent authority and obtaining it in 2009. The Catholic Church and some political parties during the Berlusconi IV Cabinet ruthlessly attacked them. Eluana is never shown in the film, but images of television programs and newspapers mentioning her case are constantly in the background reminding the audience about her presence.

The plot features several stories chained to themselves and to the themes of life and death. Uliano is a Member of the Parliament elected for Forza Italia who refuses to align himself with the party and plans to vote against a bill that will make euthanasia illegal; his daughter Maria joins an anti-euthanasia Christian prayer group in front of Eluana's hospital, but then she falls in love with Roberto, an activist for the opposite pro-euthanasia group whose brother Pipino has bipolar disorder. A great French actress referred as the "Divine Mother" is married to an Italian actor, but since when their daughter Rosa has felt into a coma she stopped caring about her husband, son and work, spending her whole time praying for her health. Rossa is a young woman addicted to heroin with suicidal tendencies saved and eventually persuaded to live by Pallido, a doctor who felt in love with her.

== Cast ==
- Toni Servillo as Uliano Beffardi
- Alba Rohrwacher as Maria
- Isabelle Huppert as Divina Madre
- Maya Sansa as Rossa
- Michele Riondino as Roberto
- Gianmarco Tognazzi as Divina Madre's husband
- Roberto Herlitzka as Psychiatrist senator

== Reception ==
=== Critical response ===
Dormant Beauty has an approval rating of 81% on review aggregator website Rotten Tomatoes, based on 26 reviews, and an average rating of 6.8/10. The website's critical consensus states: "As complex and compelling a work as its ripped-from-the-headlines storyline deserves, Dormant Beauty serves as a delightfully thorny testament to director Marco Bellocchio and his talented cast". Metacritic assigned the film a weighted average score of 72 out of 100, based on 12 critics, indicating "generally favorable reviews".

=== Awards and nominations ===
- Brian Award at the 69th Venice International Film Festival.

== See also ==
- Isabelle Huppert on screen and stage
