= The Big Heart of Girls =

2011 film

- Film poster
- Directed by: Pupi Avati
- Written by: Pupi Avati
- Starring: Cesare Cremonini; Micaela Ramazzotti
- Music by: Lucio Dalla
- Release date: 11 November 2011
- Running time: 85 minutes
- Country: Italy
- Language: Italian

The Big Heart of Girls (Italian: Il cuore grande delle ragazze) is a 2011 Italian drama film directed by Pupi Avati.

== Cast ==
- Cesare Cremonini as Carlino Vigetti
- Micaela Ramazzotti as Francesca Osti
- Gianni Cavina as Sisto Osti
- Erika Blanc as Eugenia Vigetti (as Erica Blanc)
- Manuela Morabito as Rosalia Osti
- Gisella Sofio as Olimpia Osti
- Massimo Bonetti as Umberto Vigetti
- Isabelle Adriani as Marcella Vanarini
- Sydne Rome as Enrichetta
