= The Great Pumpkin (film) =

1993 film

- Film poster
- Directed by: Francesca Archibugi
- Written by: Francesca Archibugi
- Produced by: Guido De Laurentiis
- Starring: Sergio Castellitto
- Cinematography: Paolo Carnera
- Edited by: Roberto Missiroli
- Release date: 10 February 1993
- Running time: 95 minutes
- Country: Italy
- Language: Italian

The Great Pumpkin (Italian: Il grande cocomero) is a 1993 Italian drama film directed by Francesca Archibugi. It was screened in the Un Certain Regard section at the 1993 Cannes Film Festival, and selected as the Italian entry for the Best Foreign Language Film at the 66th Academy Awards, but was not accepted as a nominee. The film focuses on Valentina, a young girl, sent to a psychiatric clinic.

A literal translation of the title would substitute "watermelon" for "pumpkin"; however, the phrase has pop culture cachet from being an intentional mistranslation of "The Great Pumpkin" from the comic strip, Peanuts.

== Plot ==
Valentina, nicknamed Pippi, is the daughter of two rich spouses. After having had an attack of epilepsy she is admitted to the department of child neuropsychiatry. The doctor who takes care of her is Arturo, who is immediately convinced that the child has these attacks due to psychological and not psychiatric problems and her family is involved.

== Cast ==
- Sergio Castellitto as Arturo
- Anna Galiena as Cinzia Diotallevi, Pippi's mother
- Armando De Razza as Marcello Diotallevi, Pippi's father
- Alessia Fugardi as Valentina 'Pippi' Diotallevi
- Silvio Vannucci as Gianni
- Alessandra Panelli as Fiorella
- Victor Cavallo as Don Annibale
- Laura Betti as Aida
- Maria Consagra as a sick child's mother
- Lidia Broccolino as Laura
- Raffaele Vannoli
- Giacomo Ciarrapico as Giacomo
- Lara Pranzoni
- Tiziana Bianchi
- Andrea Di Giacomo
- Marco Coda
- Giuseppe Giordani
- Gigi Reder as Prof. Turcati

== See also ==
- List of submissions to the 66th Academy Awards for Best Foreign Language Film
- List of Italian submissions for the Academy Award for Best Foreign Language Film
- List of Italian films of 1993
