= Mignon Has Come to Stay =

- Directed by: Francesca Archibugi
- Starring: Massimo Dapporto; Céline Beauvallet; Stefania Sandrelli; Leonardo Ruta
- Music by: Roberto Gatto; Battista Lena
- Release date: 1988
- Language: Italian

Mignon è partita (literally Mignon Has Left, internationally released as Mignon Has Come to Stay) is a 1988 Italian drama film directed by Francesca Archibugi. The film won five David di Donatello awards for Best New Director, Best Screenplay, Best Actress (Stefania Sandrelli), Best Supporting Actor (Massimo Dapporto) and Best Sound.

The film centers on a sophisticated young Parisian girl who is forced to move to Rome to live with her extended family after her father runs into criminal charges and her mother has a nervous breakdown.

== Cast ==
- Stefania Sandrelli: Laura
- Jean-Pierre Duriez: Federico
- Massimo Dapporto: Aldo
- Micheline Presle: Prof. Girelli
- Céline Beauvallet: Mignon
- Leonardo Ruta: Giorgio
- Daniele Zaccaria: Tommaso
- Francesca Antonelli: Chiara
