= A Flat for Three =

A Flat for Three (Posti in piedi in paradiso)
- Directed by: Carlo Verdone
- Written by: Carlo Verdone; Pasquale Plastino; Maruska Albertazzi
- Produced by: Aurelio De Laurentiis
- Starring: Carlo Verdone; Pierfrancesco Favino; Micaela Ramazzotti; Marco Giallini
- Cinematography: Danilo Desideri
- Music by: Fabio Liberatori
- Release date: March 2, 2012
- Running time: 119 minutes
- Country: Italy
- Language: Italian

A Flat for Three (Italian: Posti in piedi in paradiso) is a 2012 Italian comedy film directed by Carlo Verdone. The film won three Nastro d'Argento Awards, including Best Comedy Film, Best Actress (Ramazzotti) and Best Supporting Actor (Giallini). The film was a box office success, grossing over 9 million euros.

== Plot ==
In Italy burden of the economic crisis three men in Rome: Ulisse, Fulvio and Domenico decide to rent an apartment together in order to live with their modest work. However the three encounter any difficulties that have forced them to always be one step away from starvation. Ulisse has to maintain his wife and daughter selling recordings of important foreign singers, Fulvio has the task of reviewing silly scandals of celebrities instead of writing articles for major artists, while Domenico must keep his wife and children going to make love with old single pensioners. At the end of the story the three, despite all the difficulties, able to have a little luck in their lives.

== Cast ==
- Carlo Verdone: Ulisse Diamanti
- Pierfrancesco Favino: Fulvio Brignola
- Marco Giallini: Domenico Segato
- Micaela Ramazzotti: Gloria
- Diane Fleri: Claire
- Nicoletta Romanoff: Lorenza
- Maria Luisa De Crescenzo: Agnese
- Tezeta Abraham: Girl in the dream
