= The First Beautiful Thing =

2010 film

- Theatrical release poster
- Directed by: Paolo Virzì
- Written by: Paolo Virzì; Francesco Bruni; Francesco Piccolo
- Produced by: Paolo Virzì
- Starring: Valerio Mastandrea; Micaela Ramazzotti; Stefania Sandrelli; Claudia Pandolfi
- Cinematography: Nicola Pecorini
- Edited by: Simone Manetti
- Music by: Carlo Virzì
- Production company: Indiana Production Company
- Distributed by: Medusa Film
- Release date: 15 January 2010
- Running time: 122 minutes
- Country: Italy
- Language: Italian

The First Beautiful Thing (Italian: La prima cosa bella) is a 2010 Italian comedy-drama film directed by Paolo Virzì, produced by Medusa Film, Motorino Amaranto and Indiana Production, released in Italy on 15 January 2010. The film stars Micaela Ramazzotti, Valerio Mastandrea, Claudia Pandolfi and Stefania Sandrelli. On 9 November 2010 the film opened at the Cinema Italian style Film Festival in Los Angeles. Although selected as the Italian entry for the Best Foreign Language Film at the 83rd Academy Awards, it was not nominated.

== Plot ==
The film tells the story of the Michelucci family, from the 1970s to the present day: the central character is the stunningly beautiful Anna, the lively, frivolous and sometimes embarrassing mother of Bruno and Valeria. Everything begins in the Summer of 1971, at the annual summer beauty pageant held at Livorno's most popular bathing establishment. Anna is unexpectedly crowned "Most Beautiful Mother", unwittingly stirring the violent jealousy of her husband, a Non-commissioned officer of Carabinieri. From then on, chaos strikes the family and for Anna, Bruno and his sister Valeria, it is the start of an adventure that will only end thirty years later. The whole movie is set when Bruno, a high school teacher who ended up living in Milan after managing to escape from Livorno and his mother, returns to his hometown to be at his mother's side during her very last days, remembering many of the key episodes of his family life through a long series of flashbacks.

== Cast ==
- Valerio Mastandrea as Bruno Michelucci
- Micaela Ramazzotti as Anna Nigiotti in Michelucci - 1971-1981
- Stefania Sandrelli as Anna Nigiotti in Michelucci - 2008
- Claudia Pandolfi as Valeria Michelucci
- Marco Messeri as Il Nesi
- Fabrizia Sacchi as Sandra
- Aurora Frasca as Valeria Michelucci - child
- Giacomo Bibbiani as Bruno Michelucci - child
- Giulia Burgalassi as Valeria Michelucci - teenager
- Francesco Rapalino as Bruno - teenager
- Sergio Albelli as Mario Michelucci
- Isabella Cecchi as Zia Leda Nigiotti
- Emanuele Barresi as Roberto Lenzi
- Dario Ballantini as Avvocato Cenerini
- Paolo Ruffini as Cristiano Cenerini

== Reception ==
=== Critical response ===
The First Beautiful Thing has an approval rating of 74% on review aggregator website Rotten Tomatoes, based on 19 reviews, and an average rating of 6.6/10. Metacritic assigned the film a weighted average score of 62 out of 100, based on 10 critics, indicating generally favorable reviews.

=== Awards and nominations ===
The film was nominated for 18 David di Donatello Awards, and won Best Screenplay (Paolo Virzì, Francesco Bruni, Francesco Piccolo), Best Actress Micaela Ramazzotti Best Actor Valerio Mastandrea. 4 Silver Ribbon, Director of the best film Paolo Virzì, Best screenplay, Best Actress Stefania Sandrelli and Micaela Ramazzotti, Best Costume Gabriella Pescucci. The film was nominated for the European Film Award for Best Director. It was selected as the Italian entry for the Best Foreign Language Film at the 83rd Academy Awards, but it didn't make the final shortlist.

In July 2010, La prima cosa bella (The first beautiful Thing) won four Silver Ribbon awards: Director of the Best Film of the Year (Paolo Virzi), Best Actress Micaela Ramazzotti and Stefania Sandrelli, Best Screenplay Paolo Virzi, Francesco Bruni, Francesco Piccolo) and Best Costume Design to the Oscar winner Gabriella Pescucci. The film was screened at some international film festivals including the Open Roads, New York, the Shanghai International Film Festival, the Annecy Cinéma Italien Film Festival and the NICE Italian Film Festival, San Francisco.

== See also ==
- List of submissions to the 83rd Academy Awards for Best Foreign Language Film
- List of Italian submissions for the Academy Award for Best Foreign Language Film
