= Fasten Your Seatbelts =

- Directed by: Ferzan Özpetek
- Written by: Ferzan Özpetek; Gianni Romoli
- Starring: Kasia Smutniak; Francesco Arca
- Cinematography: Gian Filippo Corticelli
- Music by: Pasquale Catalano
- Release date: 6 March 2014
- Running time: 110 minutes
- Country: Italy
- Language: Italian

Fasten Your Seatbelts (Italian: Allacciate le cinture) is a 2014 Italian drama film written and directed by Ferzan Özpetek. For their performances in this film Kasia Smutniak and Paola Minaccioni won the Nastro d'Argento Awards for best actress and best supporting actress respectively.

== Cast ==
- Kasia Smutniak as Elena
- Francesco Arca as Antonio
- Filippo Scicchitano as Fabio
- Carolina Crescentini as Silvia
- Francesco Scianna as Giorgio
- Carla Signoris as Anna
- Elena Sofia Ricci as Viviana / Dora
- Paola Minaccioni as Egle Santini
- Giulia Michelini as Diana
- Luisa Ranieri as Maricla
