= Francesca Archibugi =

Italian film director and scriptwriter

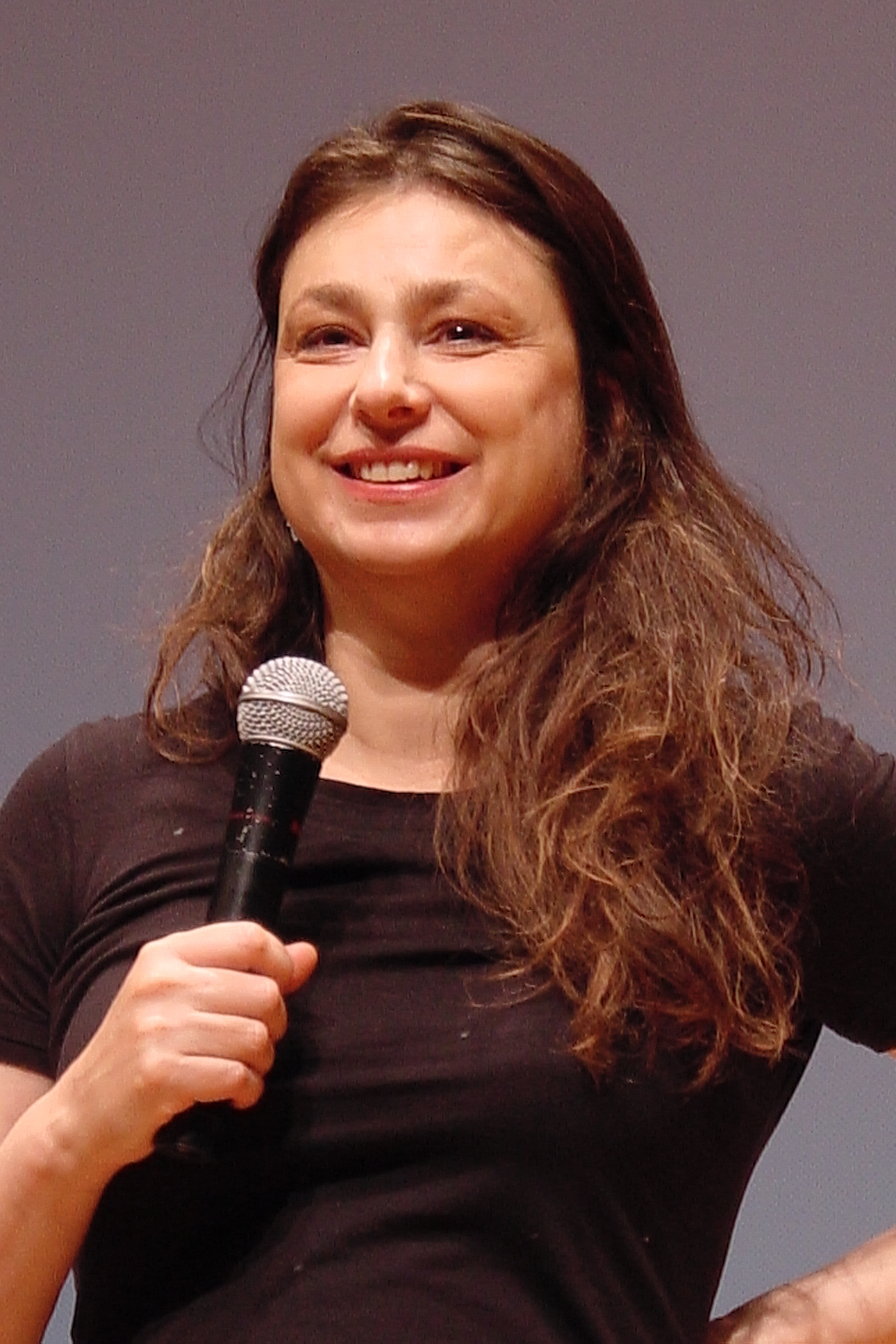
- Francesca Archibugi at the Italian Film Festival in Tokyo, 3 May 2008
- Born: 16 May 1960 (age 66); Rome, Italy
- Occupations: Film director; screenwriter
- Years active: 1988–present

Francesca Archibugi (Italian pronunciation: [franˈtʃeska arkiˈbuːdʒi]; born 16 May 1960) is an Italian film director and scriptwriter.

== Life and career ==
Born and raised in Rome in an intellectual family (her elder brother is the political and economic theorist Daniele Archibugi), she started to study acting with Alessandro Fersen and graduated in Film Direction from the Centro Sperimentale di Cinematografia in Rome.

From 1980 to 1983 she directed short films such as La piccola avventura (1981), about handicapped children, and acted in La caduta degli angeli ribelli (1981), directed by Marco Tullio Giordana and starring Alida Valli. She filmed the short Un sogno truffato in 1984 with the Lualdi-Interlenghi duo and played the neurotic intellectual woman in Giuseppe Bertolucci's film Segreti, segreti (1986), again starring Alida Valli, and with Rossana Podestà, Lea Massari, Lina Sastri and Stefania Sandrelli.

She wrote the script of L'estate sta finendo in 1987.

Her long film debut came with Mignon Has Come to Stay in 1988, a bitter family portrait that examines the first experiences and disappointments of teenage love. The film won 5 David di Donatello awards: Best New Director, Best Actress (Stefania Sandrelli), Best Supporting Actor (Massimo Dapporto), Best Script and Best Sound. During the filming, she fell in love with the composer Battista Lena, who wrote the score for her film.

Her second film, Towards Evening (1990), starring Marcello Mastroianni and Sandrine Bonnaire, was a success. It was named Best Film of the year at David di Donatello Awards. The film was entered into the 17th Moscow International Film Festival.

Her third film, The Great Pumpkin (Il grande cocomero) (1993), starring Sergio Castellitto and Anna Galiena, won 2 David di Donatello awards, for Best Film and Best Script, and was another success. It was also screened in the Un Certain Regard section at the 1993 Cannes Film Festival.

In 1994 she filmed Con gli occhi chiusi, based on Federico Tozzi's novel, starring Laura Betti, Stefania Sandrelli, Sergio Castellitto and Debora Caprioglio. Her next film was Shooting the Moon (1998).

Ornella Muti starred in Tomorrow in (2001), a film about the 1997 Umbria and Marche earthquake. She collaborated on Pasolini – Le ragioni di un sogno (2001), and she directed Giovanna Mezzogiorno and Roberto Citran in Flying Lessons (2007).

== Filmography ==
=== As director ===
==== Film ====
- Mignon Has Come to Stay (1988)
- Towards Evening (1990)
- The Great Pumpkin (1993)
- With Closed Eyes (1994)
- Shooting the Moon (1998)
- Tomorrow (2001)
- Flying Lessons (2007)
- A Question of the Heart (2009)
- An Italian Name (2015)
- Couch Potatoes (2017)
- Vivere (2019)
- The Hummingbird (Il colibrì) (2022)
- Illusione (2025)

==== Television ====
- La strana storia di Banda Sonora (1997)
- Renzo e Lucia (2004, TV miniseries)
- Parole povere (2013)
- Romanzo famigliare (2018)

=== As screenwriter ===
- L'estate sta finendo (1987)
- The Belt (1989)
- The Wicked (1991)
- Like Crazy (2016)
- The Leisure Seeker (2017)
- Magical Nights (2018)
