= David di Donatello for Best Director =

Italian film award

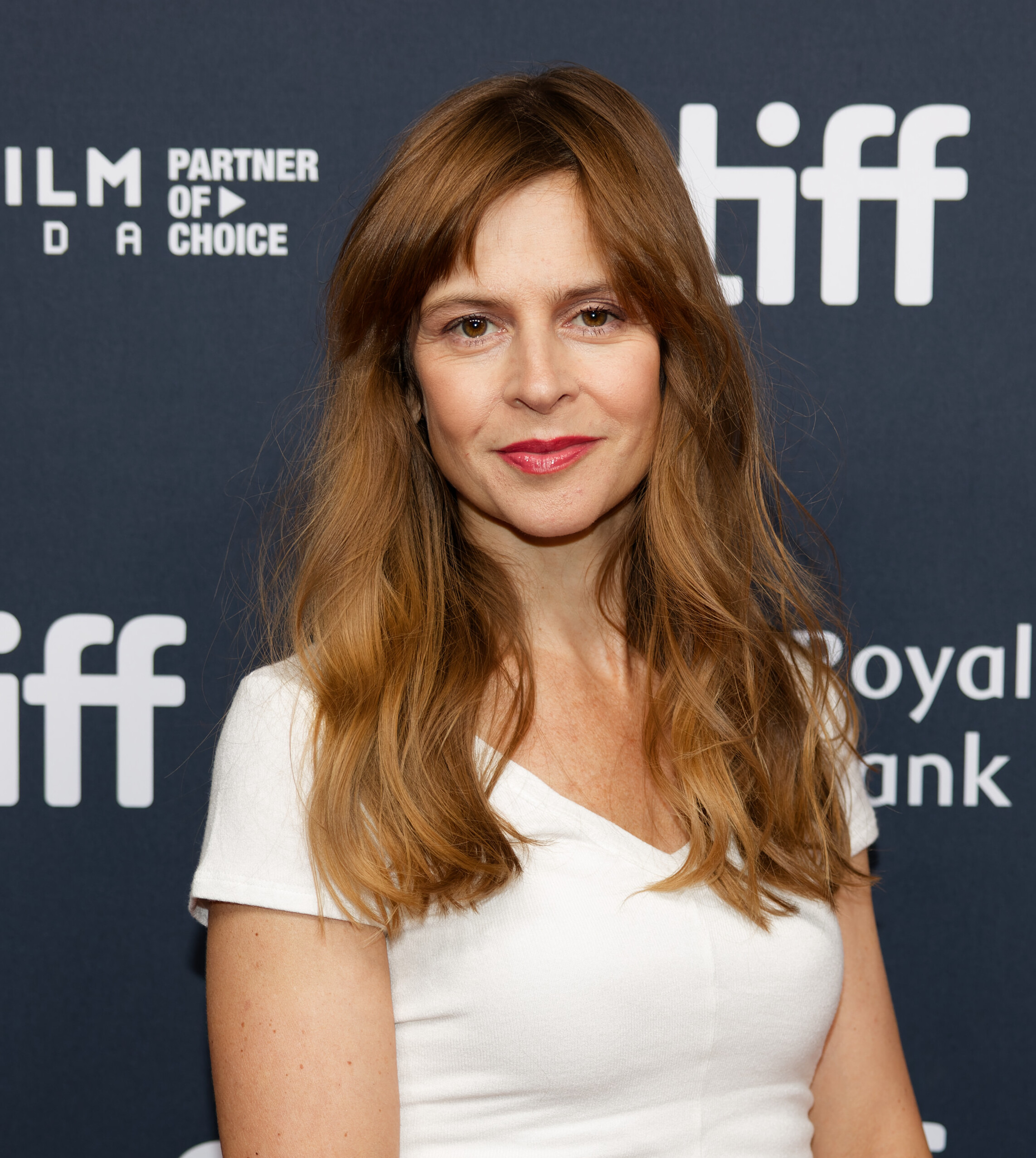
- The 2025 recipient: Maura Delpero
- Awarded for: Best director of an Italian film
- Country: Italy
- Presented by: Accademia del Cinema Italiano
- First award: 1956 (for direction in films released during the 1955/1956 film season)
- Currently held by: Maura Delpero; Vermiglio (2025)
- Website: www.daviddidonatello.it

The David di Donatello for Best Director (Italian: David di Donatello per il miglior regista) is a film award presented annually by the Accademia del Cinema Italiano (ACI, Academy of Italian Cinema) to recognize the outstanding direction of a film director who has worked within the Italian film industry during the year preceding the ceremony. The award was first given in 1956, and became competitive in 1981.

Nominees and winners are selected via runoff voting by all the members of the Accademia.

Francesco Rosi is the record holder with six awards in the category, received from 1965 to 1997, followed by Marco Bellocchio, Mario Monicelli and Giuseppe Tornatore with four.

Maura Delpero became the first woman to win in 2025.

== Winners and nominees ==
Below, winners are listed first in the colored row, followed by other nominees.

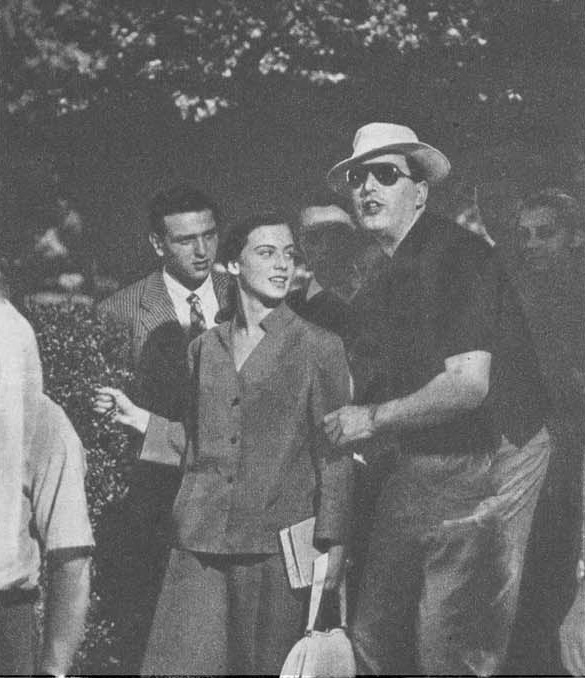
Gianni Franciolini (right) was the first holder of the award, winning in 1956 for Roman Tales.

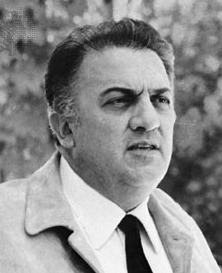
Federico Fellini won the award three times from 1957 to 1974, for Nights of Cabiria, La dolce vita, and Amarcord.

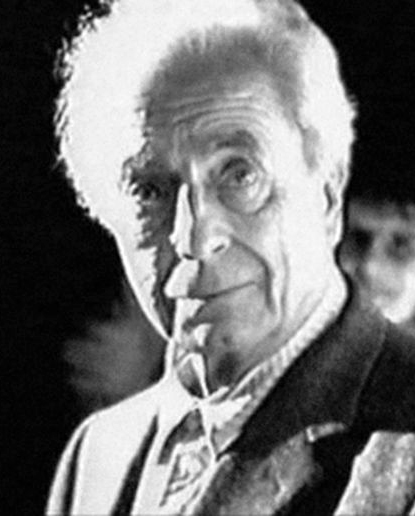
Michelangelo Antonioni won in 1961 for La notte.

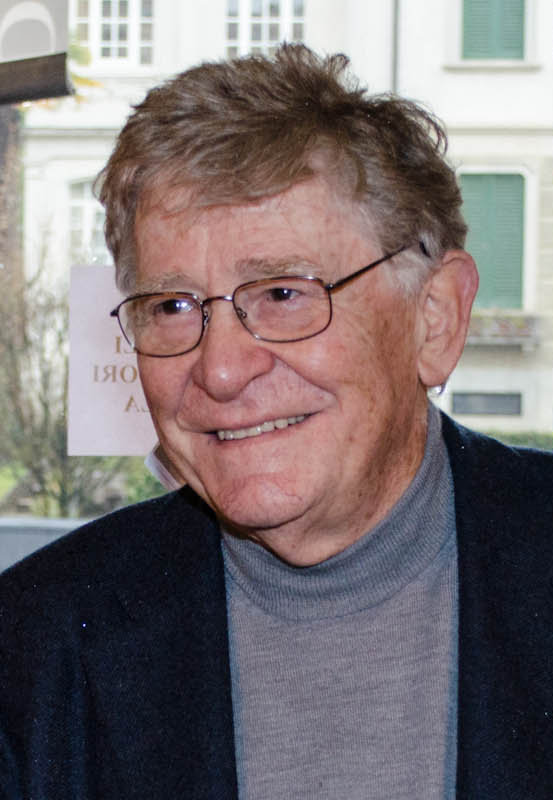
Ermanno Olmi was nominated five times, winning three times over a span of four decades.

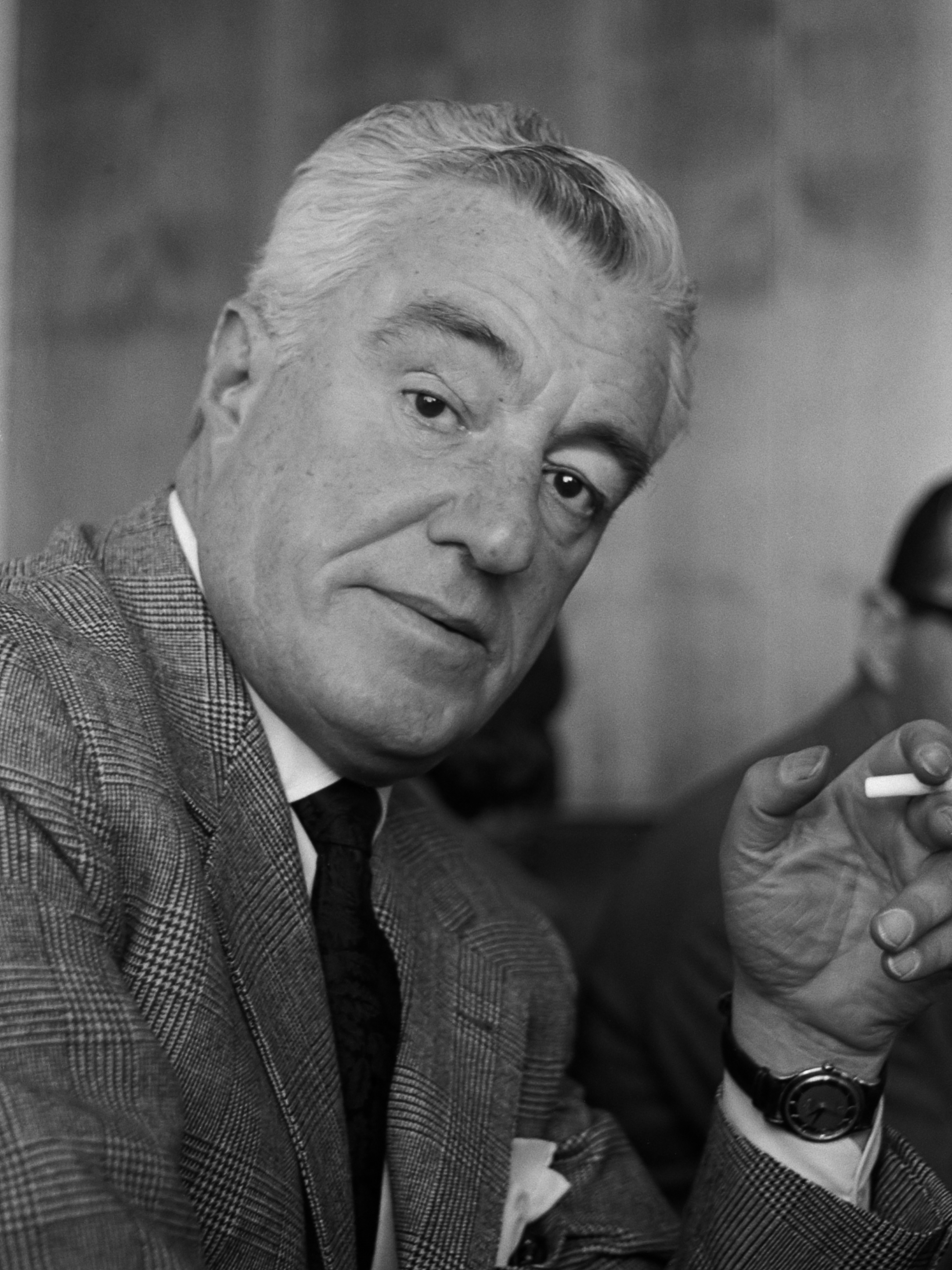
Vittorio De Sica won twice, in 1963 and 1965.

Pietro Germi won twice for Seduced and Abandoned and The Birds, the Bees and the Italians.

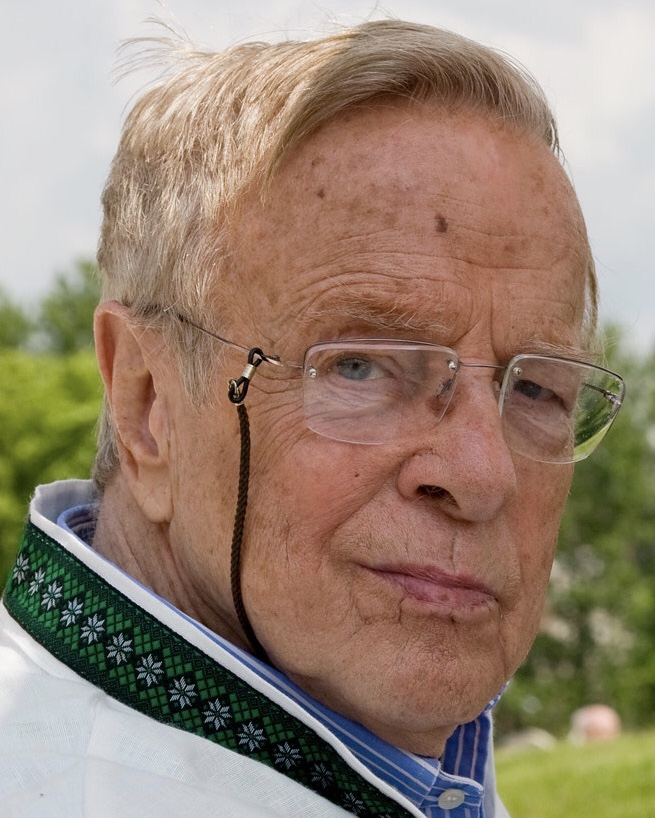
Franco Zeffirelli won in 1969 for Romeo and Juliet and in 1972 for Brother Sun, Sister Moon.

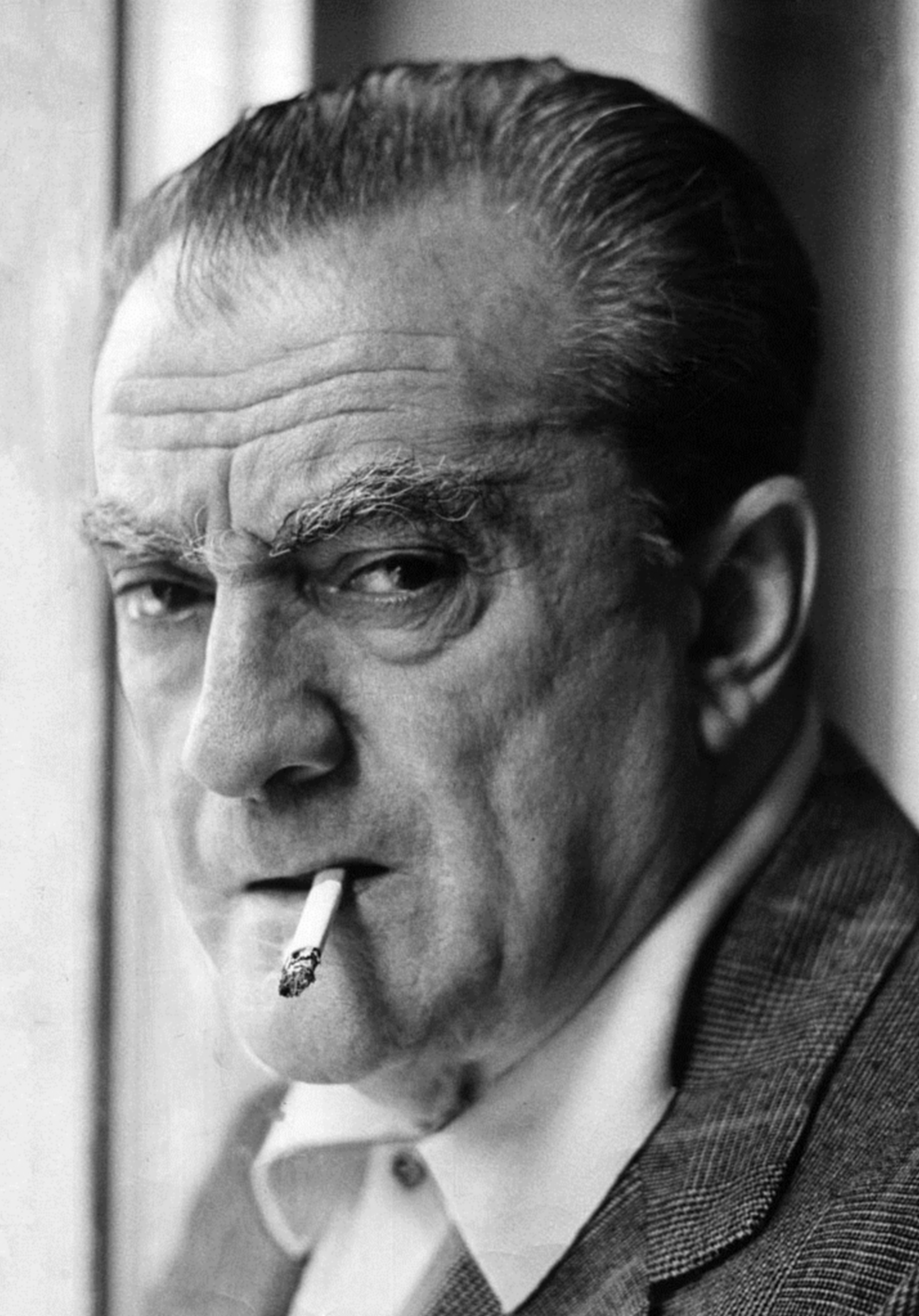
Luchino Visconti won twice, for Death in Venice in 1971 and Ludwig in 1974.

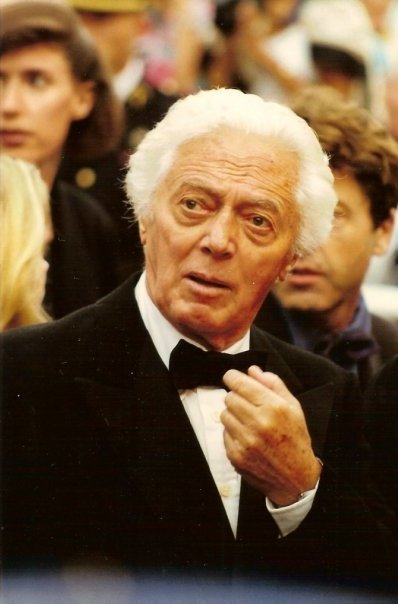
Dino Risi won in 1975 for Scent of a Woman.

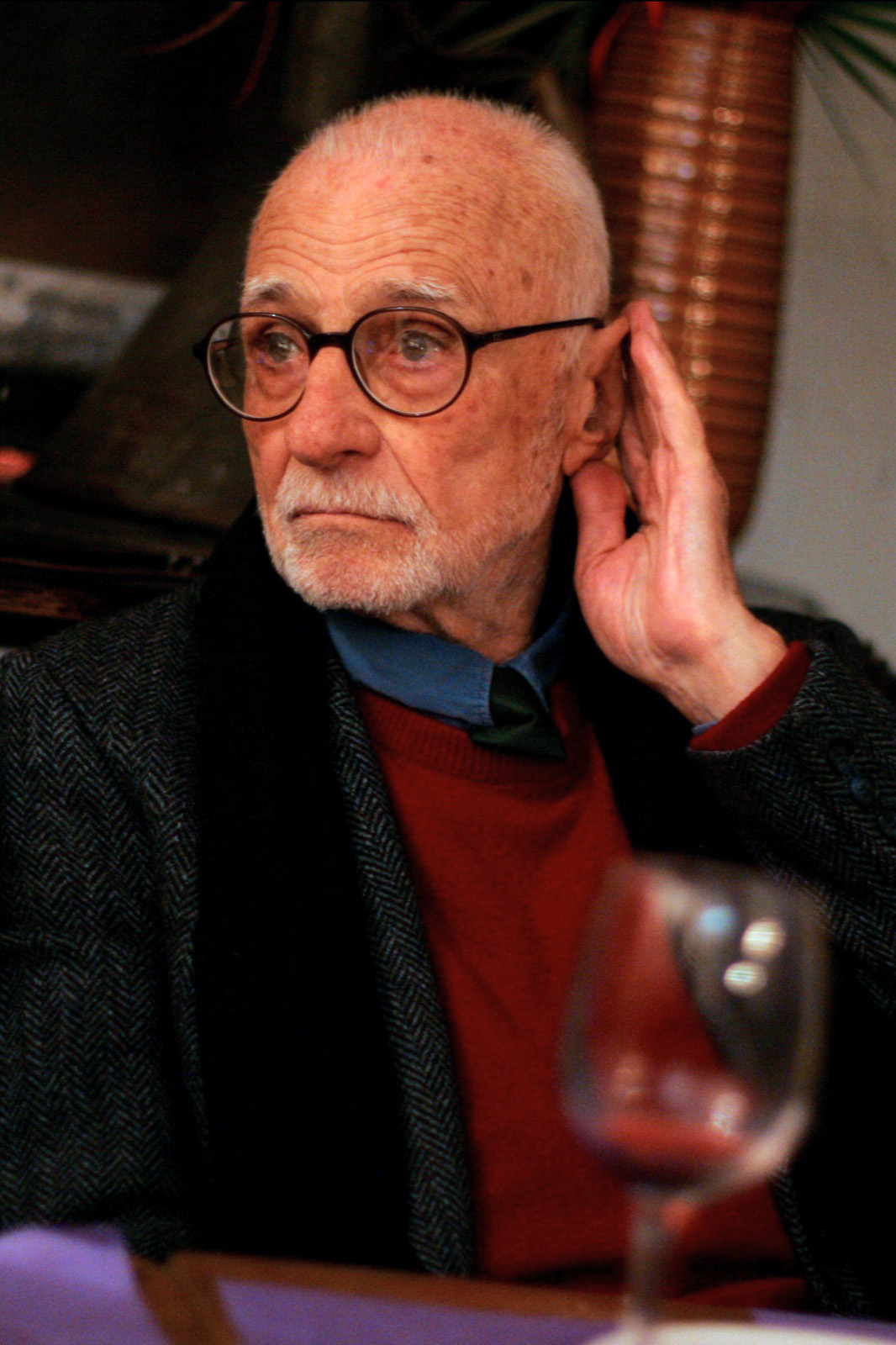
Mario Monicelli won four times from 1976 to 1990, every year he was nominated.

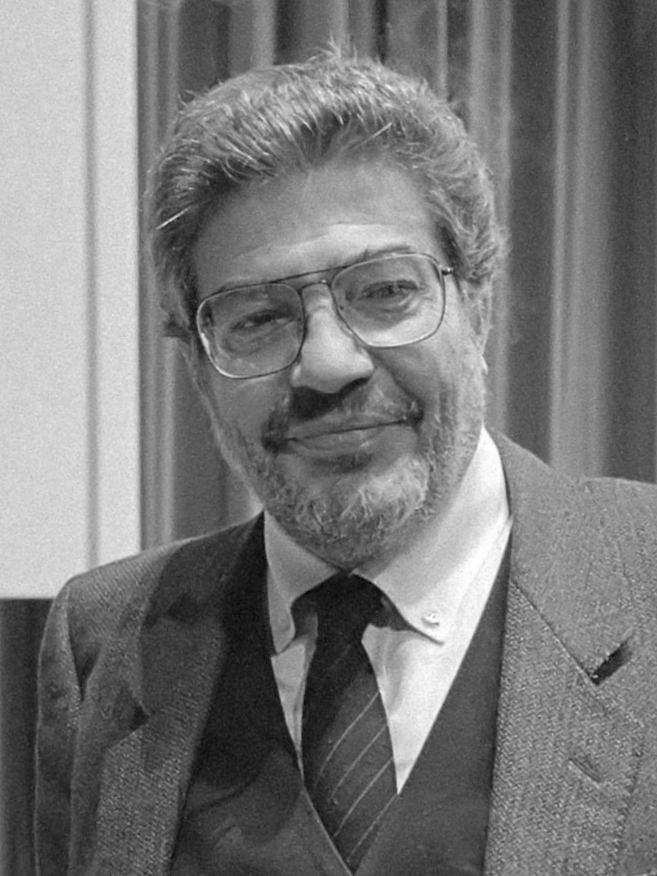
Ettore Scola won three times from 1978 to 1987, being nominated six times.

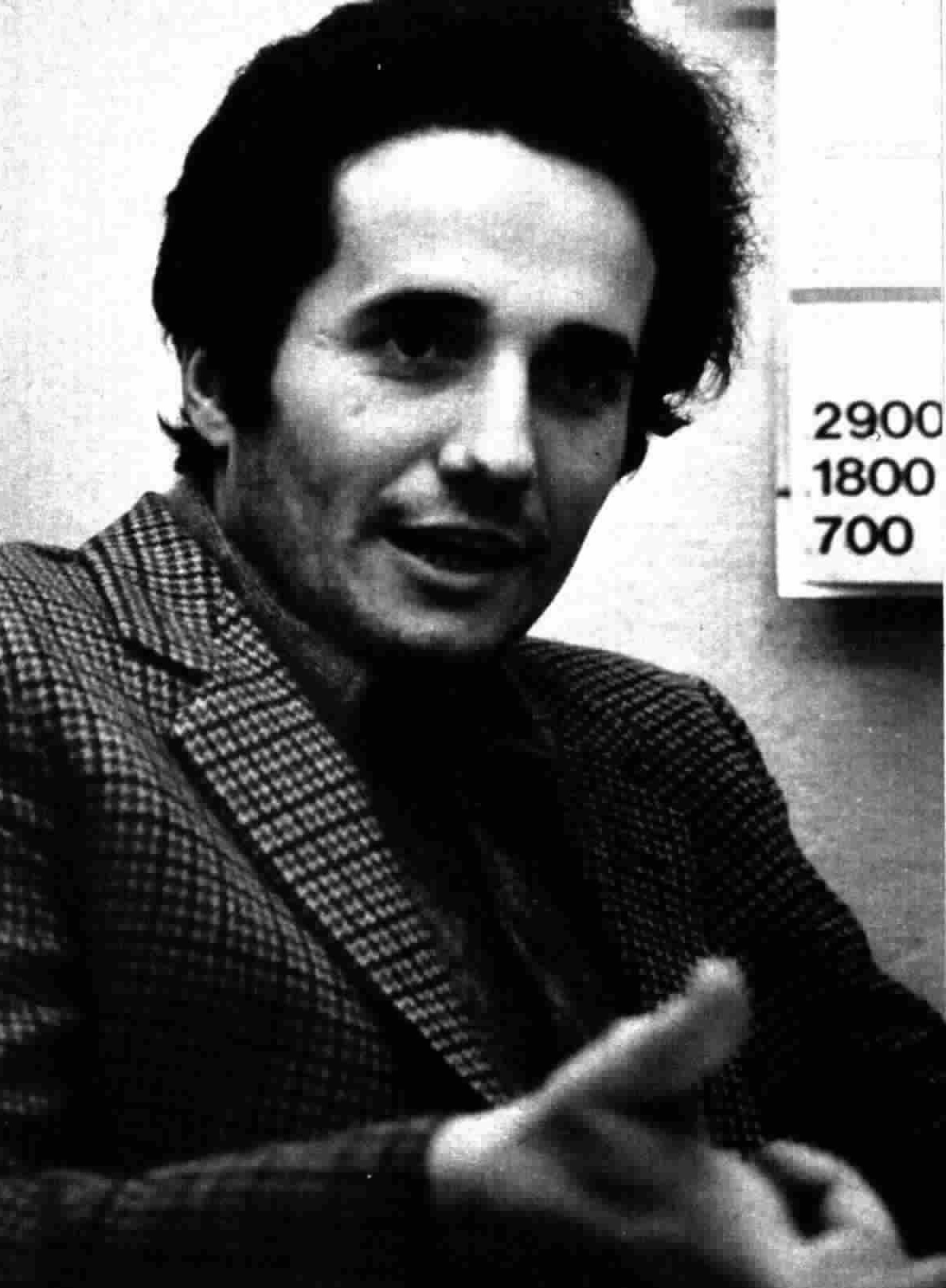
Marco Bellocchio won four times from 1980 to 2023.

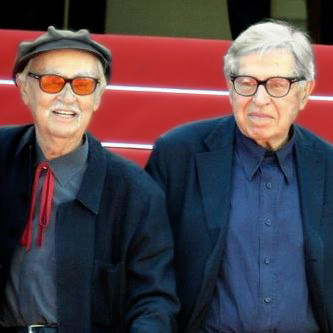
Paolo and Vittorio Taviani won twice in 1983 and 2012.

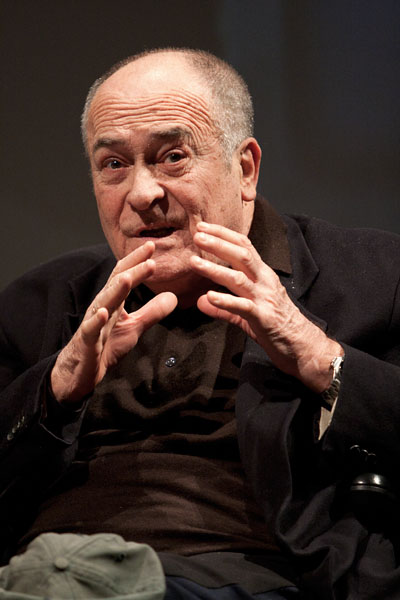
Bernardo Bertolucci won in 1988 for The Last Emperor.

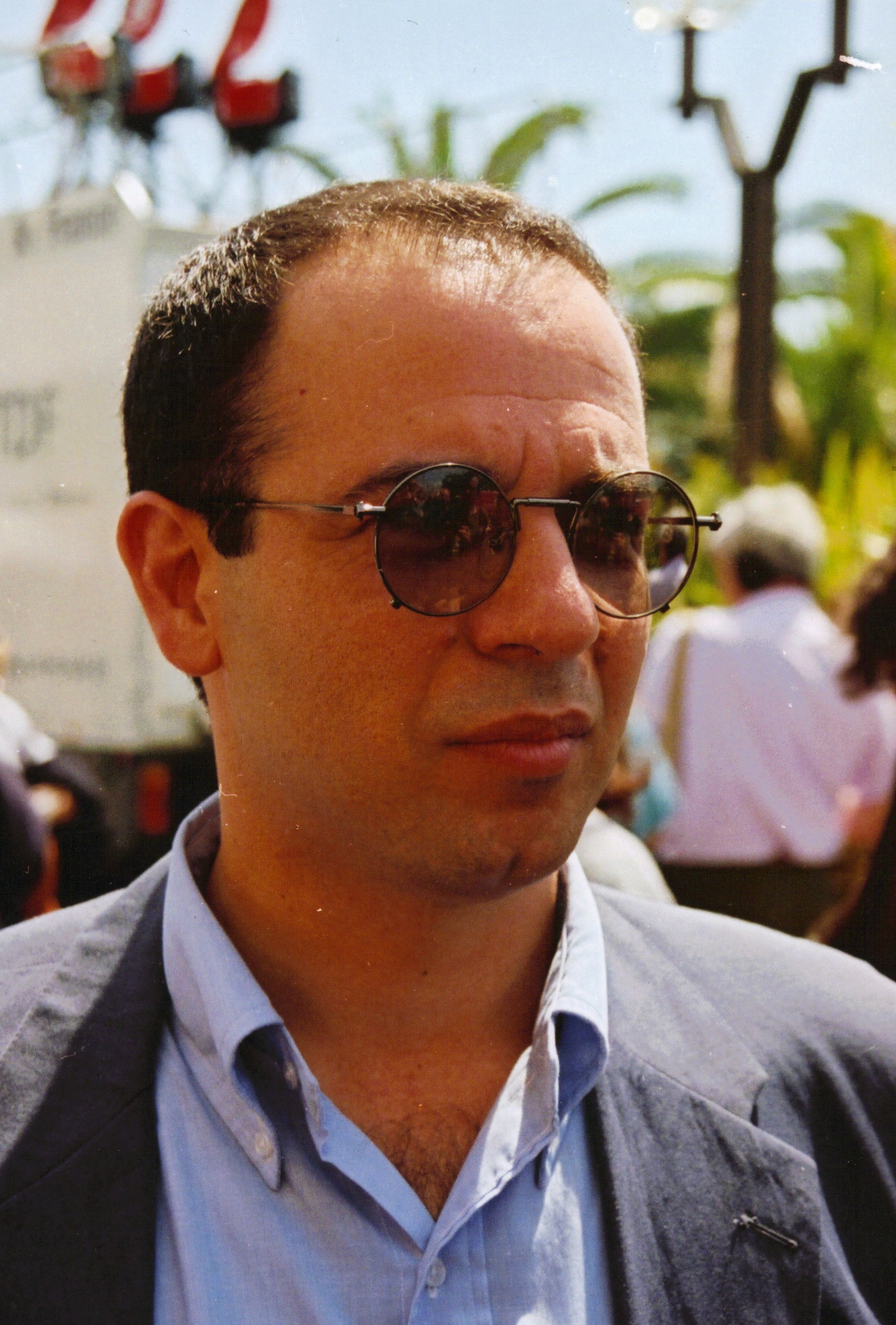
Giuseppe Tornatore won four times from 1996 to 2013, being nominated six times.

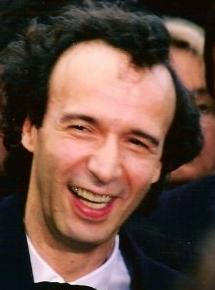
Roberto Benigni won in 1998 for Life is Beautiful.

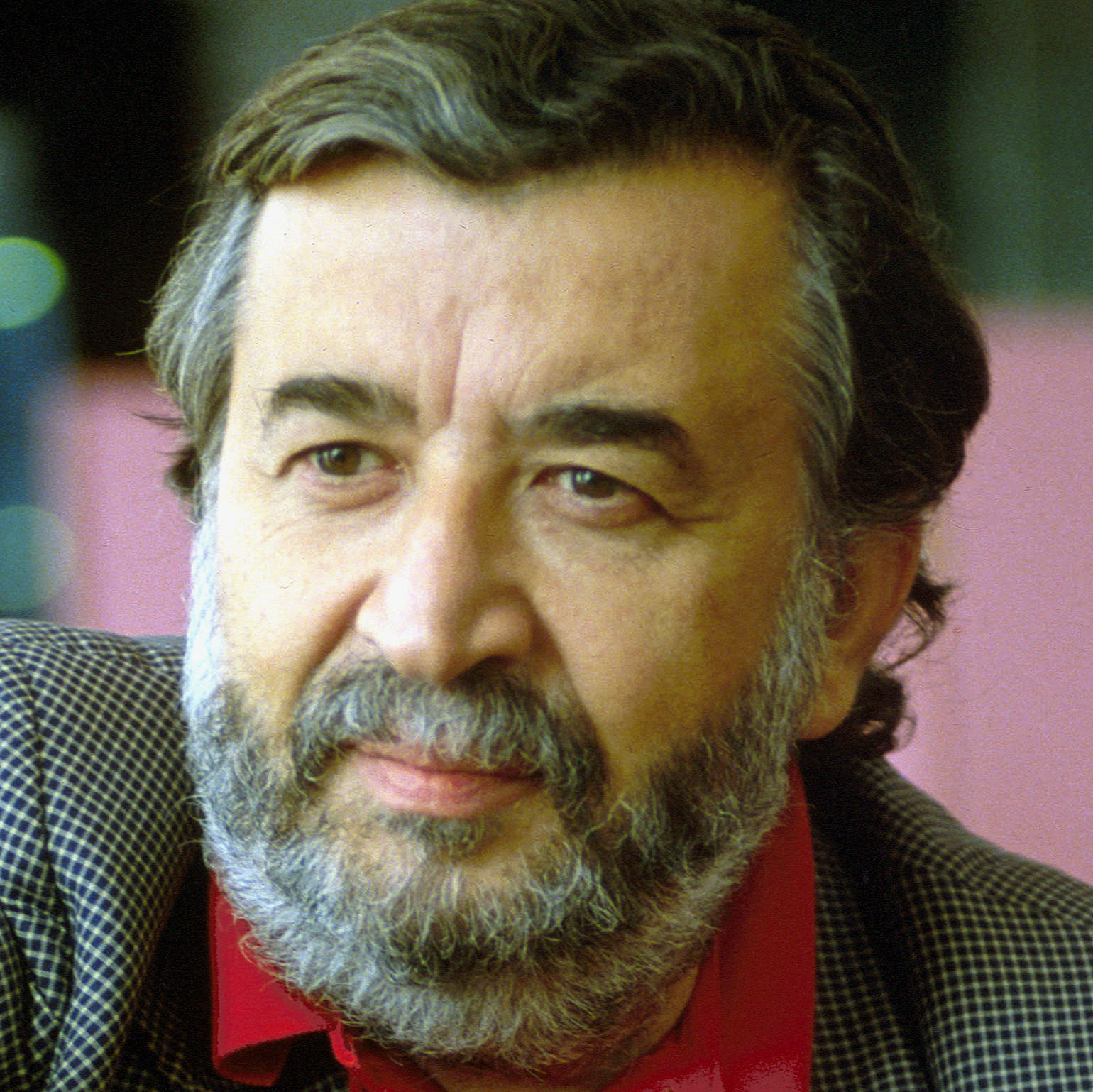
Pupi Avati won in 2003 after six nominations.

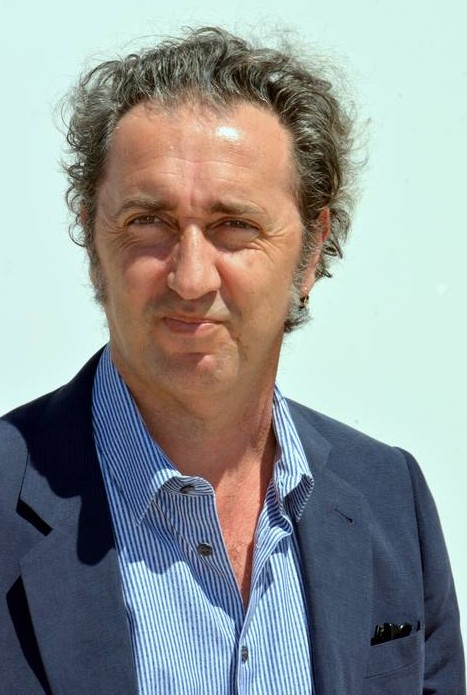
Paolo Sorrentino won in 2005 for The Consequences of Love and in 2014 for The Great Beauty.

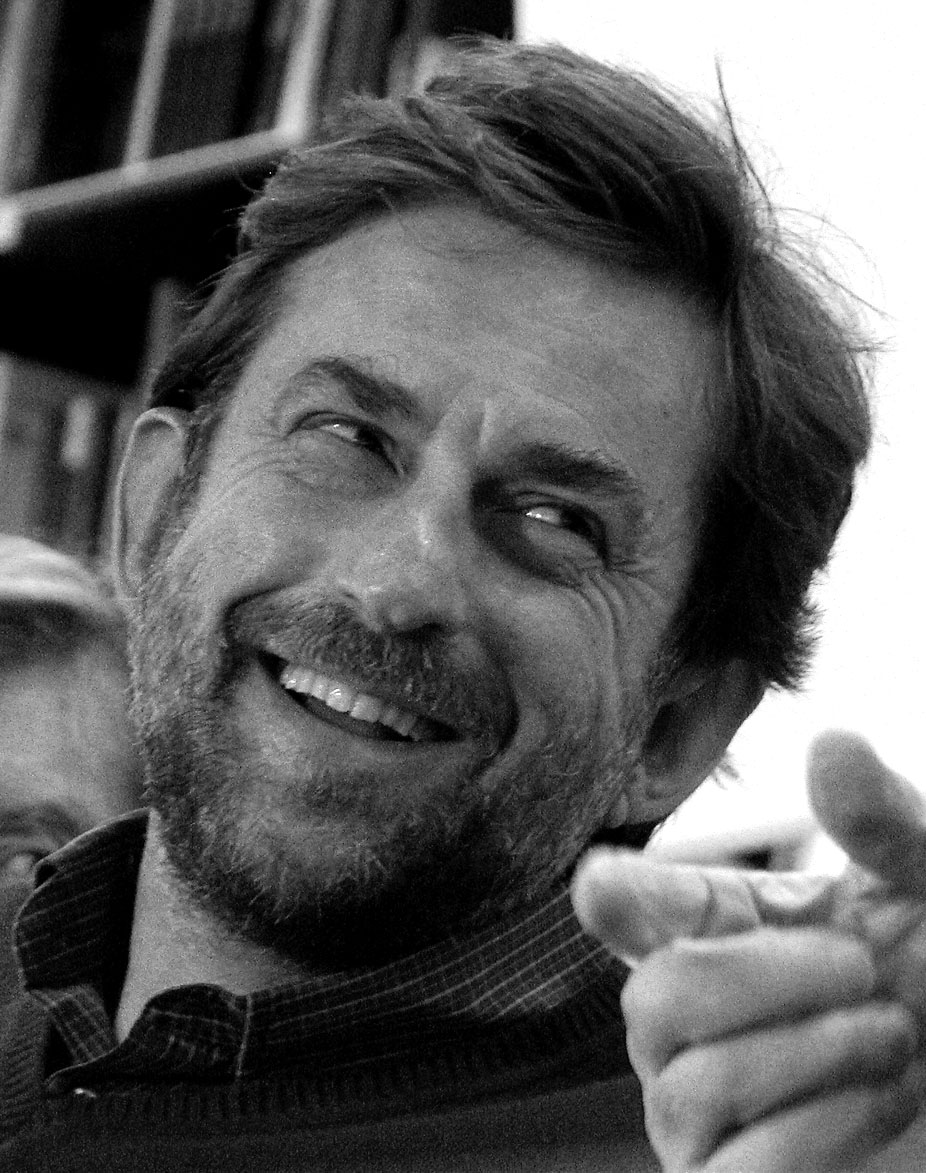
Nanni Moretti won in 2006 for The Caiman, after seven nominations.

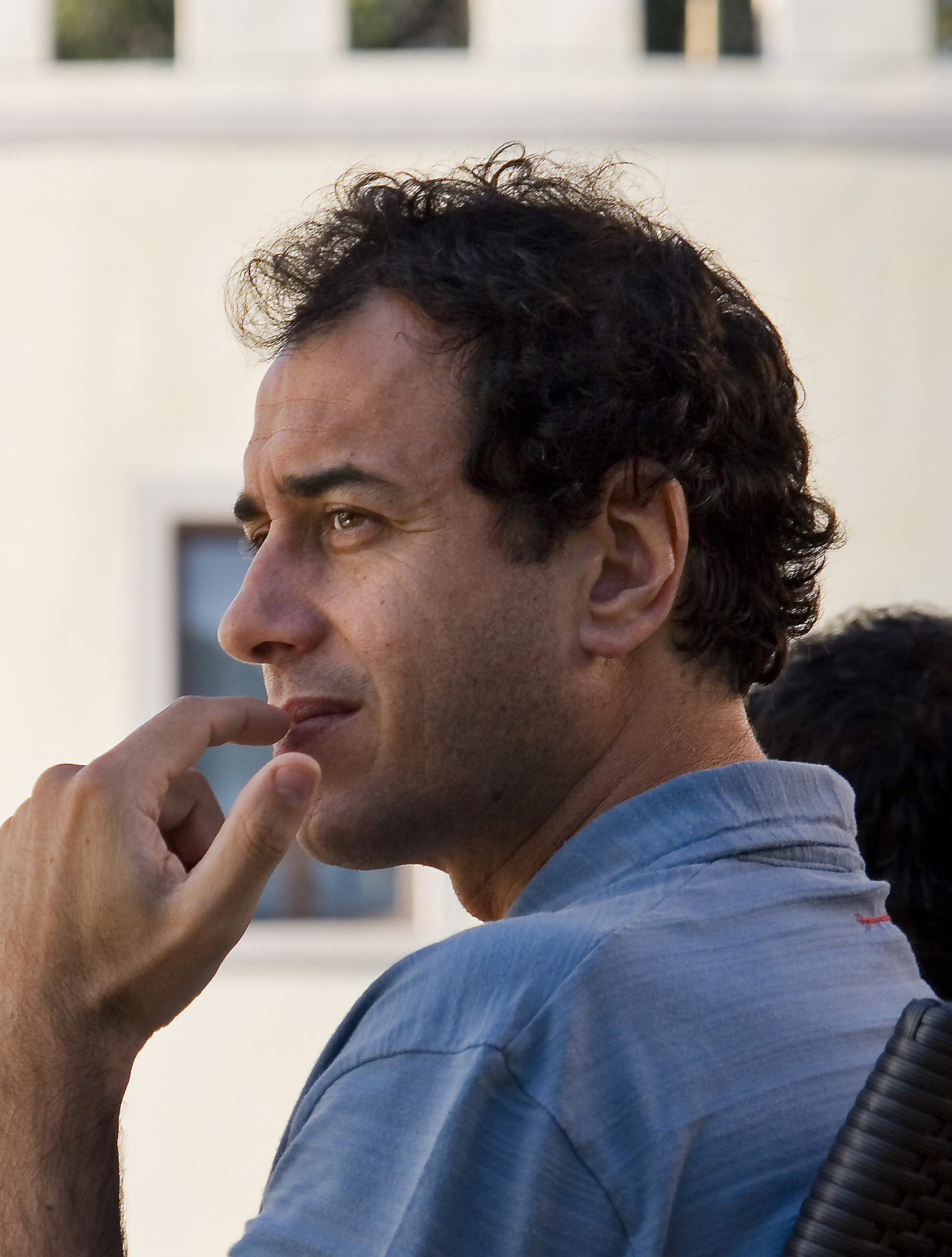
Matteo Garrone won three times, in 2009, 2016 and 2019, for Gomorrah, Tale of Tales and Dogman.

=== 1950s ===
Year	Director(s)	English Title	Original Title
1955/56	Gianni Franciolini	Roman Tales	Racconti romani
1956/57
1956/57	Federico Fellini	Nights of Cabiria	Le notti di Cabiria
1958/59
1958/59	Alberto Lattuada	Tempest	La tempesta

=== 1960s ===
Year	Director(s)	Film
1959/60 (5th)	Federico Fellini	La dolce vita
1960/61 (6th)
1960/61 (6th)	Michelangelo Antonioni	La notte
1961/62 (7th)
1961/62 (7th)	Ermanno Olmi	Il posto
1962/63 (8th)
1962/63 (8th)	Vittorio De Sica	The Condemned of Altona
1963/64 (9th)
1963/64 (9th)	Pietro Germi	Seduced and Abandoned
1964/65 (10th)
1964/65 (10th)	Vittorio De Sica	Marriage Italian-Style
1964/65 (10th)	Francesco Rosi	The Moment of Truth
1965/66 (11th)
1965/66 (11th)	Alessandro Blasetti	Me, Me, Me... and the Others
1965/66 (11th)	Pietro Germi	The Birds, the Bees and the Italians
1966/67 (12th)
1966/67 (12th)	Luigi Comencini	Misunderstood
1967/68 (13th)
1967/68 (13th)	Carlo Lizzani	Bandits in Milan
1968/69 (14th)
1968/69 (14th)	Franco Zeffirelli	Romeo and Juliet

=== 1970s ===
Year	Director(s)	Film
1969/70 (15th)	Gillo Pontecorvo	Burn!
1970/71 (16th)
1970/71 (16th)	Luchino Visconti	Death in Venice
1971/72 (17th)
1971/72 (17th)	Sergio Leone	Duck, You Sucker!
1971/72 (17th)	Franco Zeffirelli	Brother Sun, Sister Moon
1972/73 (18th)
1972/73 (18th)	Luchino Visconti	Ludwig
1973/74 (19th)
1973/74 (19th)	Federico Fellini	Amarcord
1974/75 (20th)
1974/75 (20th)	Dino Risi	Scent of a Woman
1975/76 (21st)
1975/76 (21st)	Mario Monicelli	My Friends
1975/76 (21st)	Francesco Rosi	Illustrious Corpses
1976/77 (22nd)
1976/77 (22nd)	Mario Monicelli	An Average Little Man
1976/77 (22nd)	Valerio Zurlini	The Desert of the Tartars
1977/78 (23rd)
1977/78 (23rd)	Ettore Scola	A Special Day
1978/79 (24th)
1978/79 (24th)	Francesco Rosi	Christ Stopped at Eboli

=== 1980s ===
Year	Director(s)	Film
1979/80(25th)	Marco Bellocchio	A Leap in the Dark
1979/80(25th)	Gillo Pontecorvo	Ogro
1980/81 (26th)
1980/81 (26th)	Francesco Rosi	Three Brothers
1980/81 (26th)	Luigi Comencini	Eugenio
1980/81 (26th)	Ettore Scola	Passion of Love
1981/82 (27th)
1981/82 (27th)	Marco Ferreri	Tales of Ordinary Madness
1981/82 (27th)	Salvatore Piscicelli	The Opportunities of Rosa
1981/82 (27th)	Carlo Verdone	Talcum Powder
1982/83 (28th)
1982/83 (28th)	Paolo and Vittorio Taviani	The Night of the Shooting Stars
1982/83 (28th)	Gianni Amelio	Blow to the Heart
1982/83 (28th)	Ettore Scola	That Night in Varennes
1983/84 (29th)
1983/84 (29th)	Ettore Scola	Le Bal
1983/84 (29th)	Federico Fellini	And the Ship Sails On
1983/84 (29th)	Nanni Loy	Where's Picone?
1984/85 (30th)
1984/85 (30th)	Francesco Rosi	Carmen
1984/85 (30th)	Pupi Avati	Bank Clerks
1984/85 (30th)	Paolo and Vittorio Taviani	Kaos
1985/86 (31st)
1985/86 (31st)	Mario Monicelli	Let's Hope It's a Girl
1985/86 (31st)	Federico Fellini	Ginger and Fred
1985/86 (31st)	Nanni Moretti	The Mass Is Ended
1986/87 (32nd)
1986/87 (32nd)	Ettore Scola	The Family
1986/87 (32nd)	Pupi Avati	Christmas Present
1986/87 (32nd)	Francesco Maselli	A Tale of Love
1987/88 (33rd)
1987/88 (33rd)	Bernardo Bertolucci	The Last Emperor
1987/88 (33rd)	Federico Fellini	Intervista
1987/88 (33rd)	Nikita Sergeevič Mikhalkov	Dark Eyes
1988/89 (34th)
1988/89 (34th)	Ermanno Olmi	The Legend of the Holy Drinker
1988/89 (34th)	Marco Risi	Forever Mery
1988/89 (34th)	Giuseppe Tornatore	Cinema Paradiso

=== 1990s ===
Year	Director(s)	Film
1989/90 (35th)	Mario Monicelli	Dark Illness
1989/90 (35th)	Gianni Amelio	Open Doors
1989/90 (35th)	Pupi Avati	The Story of Boys & Girls
1989/90 (35th)	Federico Fellini	The Voice of the Moon
1989/90 (35th)	Nanni Loy	Street Kids
1989/90 (35th)	Nanni Moretti	Red Wood Pigeon
1990/91 (36th)
1990/91 (36th)	Marco Risi	Boys on the Outside
1990/91 (36th)	Ricky Tognazzi	Ultrà
1990/91 (36th)	Francesca Archibugi	Towards Evening
1990/91 (36th)	Daniele Luchetti	The Yes Man
1990/91 (36th)	Gabriele Salvatores	Mediterraneo
1991/92 (37th)
1991/92 (37th)	Gianni Amelio	The Stolen Children
1991/92 (37th)	Marco Risi	The Invisible Wall
1991/92 (37th)	Carlo Verdone	Damned the Day I Met You
1992/93 (38th)
1992/93 (38th)	Roberto Faenza	Jonah Who Lived in the Whale
1992/93 (38th)	Ricky Tognazzi	The Escort
1992/93 (38th)	Francesca Archibugi	The Great Pumpkin
1993/94 (39th)
1993/94 (39th)	Carlo Verdone	Let's Not Keep in Touch
1993/94 (39th)	Nanni Moretti	Caro diario
1993/94 (39th)	Pasquale Pozzessere	Father and Son
1994/95 (40th)
1994/95 (40th)	Mario Martone	Nasty Love
1994/95 (40th)	Gianni Amelio	Lamerica
1994/95 (40th)	Alessandro D'Alatri	No Skin
1995/96 (41st)
1995/96 (41st)	Giuseppe Tornatore	The Star Maker
1995/96 (41st)	Bernardo Bertolucci	Stealing Beauty
1995/96 (41st)	Carlo Lizzani	Celluloide
1995/96 (41st)	Paolo Virzì	August Vacation
1996/97 (42nd)
1996/97 (42nd)	Francesco Rosi	The Truce
1996/97 (42nd)	Roberto Faenza	Marianna Ucrìa
1996/97 (42nd)	Wilma Labate	My Generation
1996/97 (42nd)	Gabriele Salvatores	Nirvana
1996/97 (42nd)	Maurizio Zaccaro	The Game Bag
1997/98 (43rd)
1997/98 (43rd)	Roberto Benigni	Life Is Beautiful
1997/98 (43rd)	Mario Martone	Rehearsals for War
1997/98 (43rd)	Paolo Virzì	Ovosodo
1998/99 (44th)
1998/99 (44th)	Giuseppe Tornatore	The Legend of 1900
1998/99 (44th)	Bernardo Bertolucci	Besieged
1998/99 (44th)	Giuseppe Piccioni	Fuori dal mondo

=== 2000s ===
Year	Director(s)	Film
2000	Silvio Soldini	Bread and Tulips
2000	Marco Bechis	Olympic Garage
2000	Ricky Tognazzi	Canone inverso
2001	Gabriele Muccino	The Last Kiss
2001	Marco Tullio Giordana	One Hundred Steps
2001	Nanni Moretti	The Son's Room
2002	Ermanno Olmi	The Profession of Arms
2002	Giuseppe Piccioni	Light of My Eyes
2002	Silvio Soldini	Burning in the Wind
2003	Pupi Avati	Incantato
2003	Marco Bellocchio	My Mother's Smile
2003	Matteo Garrone	The Embalmer
2003	Gabriele Muccino	Remember Me, My Love
2003	Ferzan Özpetek	Facing Windows
2004	Marco Tullio Giordana	The Best of Youth
2004	Pupi Avati	Christmas Rematch
2004	Marco Bellocchio	Good Morning, Night
2004	Sergio Castellitto	Don't Move
2004	Matteo Garrone	First Love
2005	Paolo Sorrentino	The Consequences of Love
2005	Gianni Amelio	The Keys to the House
2005	Davide Ferrario	After Midnight
2005	Andrea and Antonio Frazzi	A Children's Story
2005	Ferzan Özpetek	Sacred Heart
2006	Nanni Moretti	The Caiman
2006	Antonio Capuano	Mario's War
2006	Michele Placido	Romanzo Criminale
2006	Sergio Rubini	Our Land
2006	Carlo Verdone	My Best Enemy
2007	Giuseppe Tornatore	The Unknown Woman
2007	Marco Bellocchio	The Wedding Director
2007	Emanuele Crialese	Nuovomondo
2007	Daniele Luchetti	My Brother is an Only Child
2007	Ermanno Olmi	One Hundred Nails
2008	Andrea Molaioli	The Girl by the Lake
2008	Cristina Comencini	Black and White
2008	Antonello Grimaldi	Quiet Chaos
2008	Carlo Mazzacurati	The Right Distance
2008	Silvio Soldini	Days and Clouds
2009	Matteo Garrone	Gomorrah
2009	Pupi Avati	Giovanna's Father
2009	Fausto Brizzi	Many Kisses Later
2009	Giulio Manfredonia	We Can Do That
2009	Paolo Sorrentino	Il Divo

=== 2010s ===
Year	Director(s)	Film
2010	Marco Bellocchio	Vincere
2010	Giorgio Diritti	The Man Who Will Come
2010	Ferzan Özpetek	Loose Cannons
2010	Giuseppe Tornatore	Baarìa
2010	Paolo Virzì	The First Beautiful Thing
2011	Daniele Luchetti	La nostra vita
2011	Marco Bellocchio	Sorelle Mai
2011	Saverio Costanzo	The Solitude of Prime Numbers
2011	Claudio Cupellini	A Quiet Life
2011	Michelangelo Frammartino	Le Quattro Volte
2011	Paolo Genovese	The Immature
2011	Mario Martone	We Believed
2011	Luca Miniero	Benvenuti al Sud
2012	Paolo and Vittorio Taviani	Caesar Must Die
2012	Emanuele Crialese	Terraferma
2012	Marco Tullio Giordana	Piazza Fontana: The Italian Conspiracy
2012	Nanni Moretti	We Have a Pope
2012	Ferzan Özpetek	Magnificent Presence
2012	Paolo Sorrentino	This Must Be the Place
2013	Giuseppe Tornatore	The Best Offer
2013	Bernardo Bertolucci	Me and You
2013	Matteo Garrone	Reality
2013	Gabriele Salvatores	Siberian Education
2013	Daniele Vicari	Diaz – Don't Clean Up This Blood
2014	Paolo Sorrentino	The Great Beauty
2014	Carlo Mazzacurati	The Chair of Happiness
2014	Ferzan Özpetek	Fasten Your Seatbelt
2014	Ettore Scola	How Strange to Be Named Federico
2014	Paolo Virzì	Human Capital
2015	Francesco Munzi	Black Souls
2015	Saverio Costanzo	Hungry Hearts
2015	Mario Martone	Leopardi
2015	Nanni Moretti	Mia Madre
2015	Ermanno Olmi	Greenery Will Bloom Again
2016	Matteo Garrone	Tale of Tales
2016	Claudio Caligari	Don't Be Bad
2016	Paolo Genovese	Perfect Strangers
2016	Gianfranco Rosi	Fire at Sea
2016	Paolo Sorrentino	Youth
2017	Paolo Virzì	Like Crazy
2017	Marco Bellocchio	Sweet Dreams
2017	Edoardo De Angelis	Indivisible
2017	Claudio Giovannesi	Fiore
2017	Matteo Rovere	Italian Race
2018	Jonas Carpignano	A Ciambra
2018	Gianni Amelio	Tenderness
2018	Paolo Genovese	The Place
2018	Manetti Bros.	Love and Bullets
2018	Ferzan Özpetek	Napoli velata
2019	Matteo Garrone	Dogman
2019	Valeria Golino	Euphoria
2019	Luca Guadagnino	Call Me By Your Name
2019	Mario Martone	Capri-Revolution
2019	Alice Rohrwacher	Happy as Lazzaro

=== 2020s ===
Year	Director(s)	Film	Ref.
2020	Marco Bellocchio	The Traitor	
2020	Matteo Garrone	Pinocchio	
2020	Claudio Giovannesi	Piranhas	
2020	Pietro Marcello	Martin Eden	
2020	Matteo Rovere	The First King: Birth of an Empire	
2021	Giorgio Diritti	Hidden Away	
2021	Gianni Amelio	Hammamet	
2021	Emma Dante	The Macaluso Sisters	
2021	Damiano and Fabio D'Innocenzo	Bad Tales	
2021	Susanna Nicchiarelli	Miss Marx	
2022	Paolo Sorrentino	The Hand of God	
2022	Leonardo Di Costanzo	The Inner Cage	
2022	Giuseppe Tornatore	Ennio	
2022	Gabriele Mainetti	Freaks Out	
2022	Mario Martone	The King of Laughter	
2023	Marco Bellocchio	Exterior Night	
2023	Gianni Amelio	Lord of the Ants	
2023	Roberto Andò	Strangeness	
2023	Felix Van Groeningen and Charlotte Vandermeersch	The Eight Mountains	
2023	Mario Martone	Nostalgia	
2024	Matteo Garrone	Io capitano	
2024	Alice Rohrwacher	La chimera	
2024	Marco Bellocchio	Kidnapped	
2024	Andrea Di Stefano	Last Night of Amore	
2024	Nanni Moretti	A Brighter Tomorrow	
2025	Maura Delpero	Vermiglio	
2025	Francesca Comencini	The Time It Takes	
2025	Valeria Golino	The Art of Joy	
2025	Paolo Sorrentino	Parthenope	
2025	Andrea Segre	The Great Ambition	

== Multiple wins and nominations ==
The following individuals have won multiple Best Director awards:

Wins	Director
6	Francesco Rosi
4	Mario Monicelli
4	Giuseppe Tornatore
4	Marco Bellocchio
3	Federico Fellini
3	Matteo Garrone
3	Ermanno Olmi
3	Ettore Scola
2	Vittorio De Sica
2	Pietro Germi
2	Gillo Pontecorvo
2	Paolo Sorrentino
2	Taviani brothers
2	Ricky Tognazzi
2	Luchino Visconti
2	Franco Zeffirelli

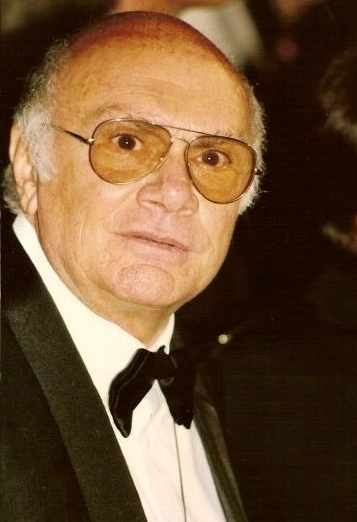
Francesco Rosi won the award six times, more than everyone else, from 1965 to 1997.

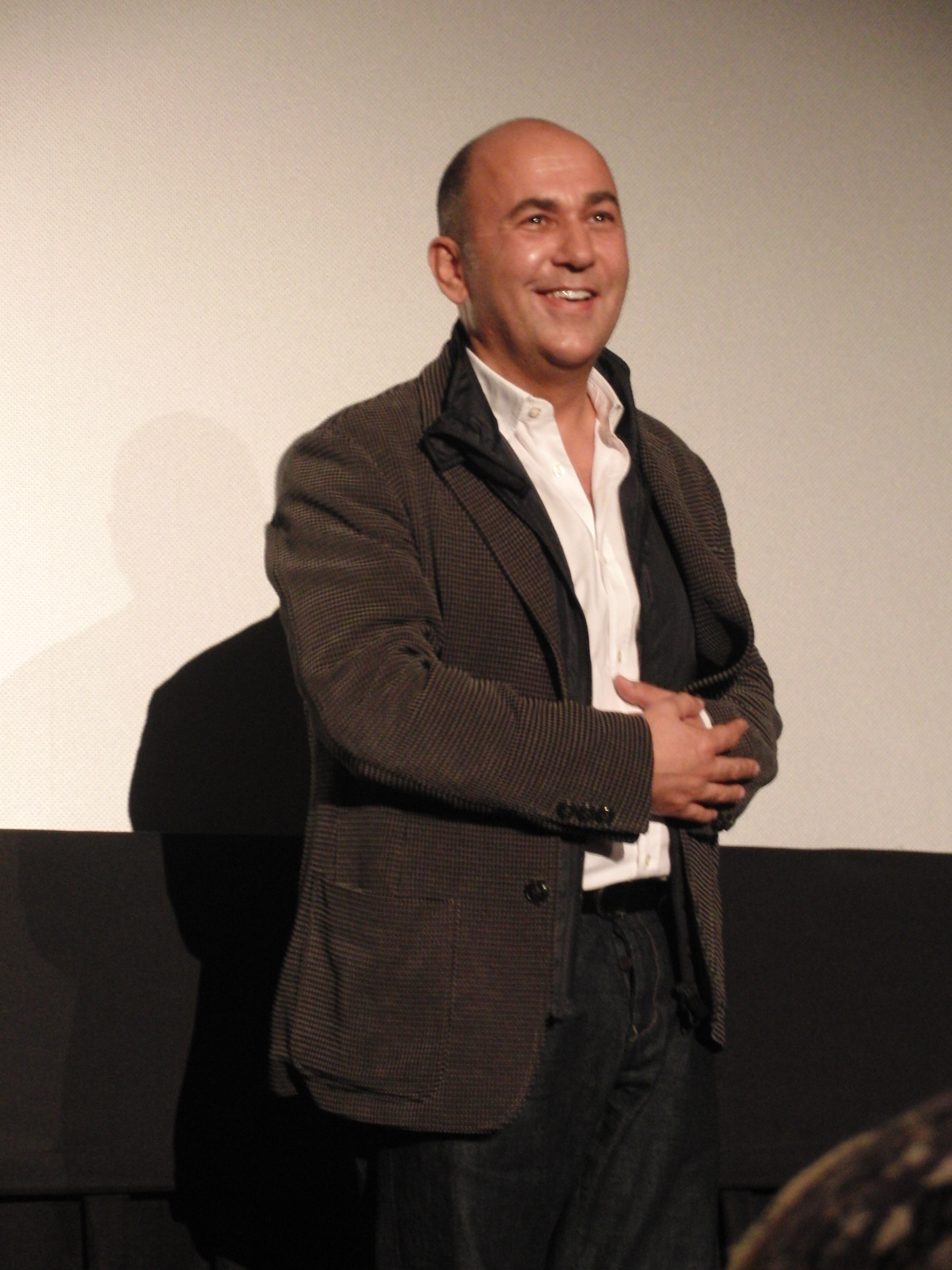
Ferzan Özpetek is the most nominated director without any wins, being nominated six times from 2003 to 2017.

The following directors have received three or more Best Director nominations (* indicates no wins):

Nominations	Director
10	Marco Bellocchio
7	Gianni Amelio
7	Federico Fellini
7	Nanni Moretti
6	Pupi Avati
6	Matteo Garrone
6	Ferzan Özpetek*
6	Francesco Rosi
6	Ettore Scola
6	Giuseppe Tornatore
5	Mario Martone
5	Ermanno Olmi
5	Paolo Sorrentino
5	Paolo Virzì
4	Bernardo Bertolucci
4	Mario Monicelli
4	Carlo Verdone
3	Paolo Genovese*
3	Marco Tullio Giordana
3	Daniele Luchetti
3	Marco Risi
3	Gabriele Salvatores*
3	Silvio Soldini
3	Taviani brothers
3	Ricky Tognazzi

== See also ==
- Nastro d'Argento for Best Director
- Academy Award for Best Director
- BAFTA Award for Best Direction
- César Award for Best Director
- European Film Award for Best Director
- Goya Award for Best Director
