= 53rd David di Donatello =

2008 Italian film awards

- Date: 18 April 2008
- Site: Auditorium Conciliazione, Rome, Italy
- Hosted by: Tullio Solenghi

Highlights
- Best Picture: The Girl by the Lake
- Most awards: The Girl by the Lake (10)
- Most nominations: Quiet Chaos (18)

Television coverage
- Network: Rai 2

The 53rd David di Donatello ceremony, presented by the Accademia del Cinema Italiano, was held on 18 April 2008.

== Winners and nominees ==
Best Film: The Girl by the Lake – directed by Andrea Molaioli; Quiet Chaos – directed by Antonello Grimaldi; Days and Clouds – directed by Silvio Soldini; The Wind Blows Round – directed by Giorgio Diritti; The Right Distance – directed by Carlo Mazzacurati	Best Producer: Nicola Giuliano, Francesca Cima – The Girl by the Lake; Domenico Procacci – Quiet Chaos; Lionello Cerri – Days and Clouds; Andrea Occhipinti, Gianluca Arcopinto – Sonetàula; Simone Bachini, Mario Chemello, Giorgio Diritti – The Wind Blows Round
Best Director: Andrea Molaioli – The Girl by the Lake; Cristina Comencini – Black and White; Antonello Grimaldi – Quiet Chaos; Silvio Soldini – Days and Clouds; Carlo Mazzacurati – The Right Distance	Best New Director: Andrea Molaioli – The Girl by the Lake; Fabrizio Bentivoglio – Don't Waste Your Time, Johnny!; Giorgio Diritti – The Wind Blows Round; Marco Martani – Concrete Romance; Silvio Muccino – Parlami d'amore
Best Actor: Toni Servillo – The Girl by the Lake; Antonio Albanese – Days and Clouds; Lando Buzzanca – I Viceré; Nanni Moretti – Quiet Chaos; Kim Rossi Stuart – Piano, solo	Best Actress: Margherita Buy – Days and Clouds; Anna Bonaiuto – The Girl by the Lake; Antonia Liskova – Riparo; Valentina Lodovini – The Right Distance; Valeria Solarino – Miss F
Best Supporting Actor: Alessandro Gassmann – Quiet Chaos; Giuseppe Battiston – Days and Clouds; Fabrizio Gifuni – The Girl by the Lake; Ahmed Hafiene – The Right Distance; Umberto Orsini – The Early Bird Catches the Worm	Best Supporting Actress: Alba Rohrwacher – Days and Clouds; Paola Cortellesi – Piano, solo; Carolina Crescentini – Parlami d'amore; Isabella Ferrari – Quiet Chaos; Valeria Golino – Quiet Chaos; Sabrina Impacciatore – Miss F
David di Donatello for Best Screenplay: Sandro Petraglia – The Girl by the Lake; Nanni Moretti, Laura Paolucci, Francesco Piccolo – Quiet Chaos; Doriana Leondeff, Francesco Piccolo, Federica Pontremoli, Silvio Soldini – Days and Clouds; Doriana Leondeff, Carlo Mazzacurati, Marco Pettenello, Claudio Piersanti – The Right Distance; Giorgio Diritti, Fredo Valla – The Wind Blows Round	Best Cinematography: Ramiro Civita – The Girl by the Lake; Luca Bigazzi – The Right Distance; Maurizio Calvesi – I Viceré; Arnaldo Catinari – Parlami d'amore; Alessandro Pesci – Quiet Chaos
Best Production Design: Francesco Frigeri – I Viceré; Paola Bizzarri – Days and Clouds; Giada Calabria – Quiet Chaos; Alessandra Mura – The Girl by the Lake; Tonino Zera – Hotel Meina	Best Score: Paolo Buonvino – Quiet Chaos; Lele Marchitelli – Piano, solo; Fausto Mesolella – Don't Waste Your Time, Johnny!; Teho Teardo – The Girl by the Lake; Giovanni Venosta – Days and Clouds
Best Original Song: "L'amore trasparente" from Quiet Chaos – Ivano Fossati; "Senza fiato" from Concrete Romance – Paolo Buonvino; "Amore fermati" from Don't Waste Your Time, Johnny! – Bernardino Zapponi, Gorni Kramer, Italo Terzoli; "L'arrivo a Milano" from Milano Palermo – Il ritorno – Pino Donaggio; "Tear Down These Houses" from Parlami d'amore – Andrea Guerra, Skin; "La rabbia" from La rabbia – Luis Bacalov	Best Editing: Giogiò Franchini – The Girl by the Lake; Paolo Cottignola – The Right Distance; Carlotta Cristiani – Days and Clouds; Eduardo Crespo, Giorgio Diritti – The Wind Blows Round; Angelo Nicolini – Quiet Chaos
Best Sound: Alessandro Zanon – The Girl by the Lake; Gaetano Carito – Quiet Chaos; François Musy – Days and Clouds; Bruno Pupparo – Black and White; Remo Ugolinelli – The Right Distance	Best Costumes: Milena Canonero – I Viceré; Ortensia De Francesco – Don't Waste Your Time, Johnny!; Catia Dottori – Hotel Meina; Maurizio Millenotti – Parlami d'amore; Silvia Nebiolo, Patrizia Mazzon – Days and Clouds; Alessandra Toesca – Quiet Chaos
Best Special Visual Effects: Paola Trisoglio, Stefano Marinoni for Visualogie – The Girl by the Lake; Proxima – Quiet Chaos; Marbea – Concrete Romance; Lee Wilson – Mother of Tears; Corrado Virgilio, Vincenzo Nisco – Winx Club: The Secret of the Lost Kingdom	Best Make-up Artist: Gino Tamagnini – I Viceré; Martinas Cossu – Come tu mi vuoi; Gianfranco Mecacci – Quiet Chaos; Fernanda Perez – The Girl by the Lake; Esmé Sciaroni – Days and Clouds
Best Hairstylist: Maria Teresa Corridoni – I Viceré; Aldina Governatori – Days and Clouds; Giorgio Gregorini – Scusa ma ti chiamo amore; Ferdinando Merolla – Hotel Meina; Sharim Sabatini – Quiet Chaos	Best Documentary Feature: Madri – directed by Barbara Cupisti; Centravanti nato – directed by Gianclaudio Guiducci; La minaccia – directed by Silvia Luzi, Luca Bellino; Crossing the Line – directed by Pietro Marcello; We Want Roses Too – directed by Alina Marazzi
Best Short Film: Uova – directed by Alessandro Celli; Adil & Yusuf – directed by Claudio Noce; Il bambino di Carla – directed by Emanuela Rossi; Ora che Marlene – directed by Giovanna Nazarena Silvestri; Tramondo – directed by Giacomo Agnetti, Davide Bazzali	Best European Film: Irina Palm – directed by Sam Garbarski; 4 Months, 3 Weeks and 2 Days – directed by Cristian Mungiu; The Secret of the Grain – directed by Abdellatif Kechiche; Elizabeth: The Golden Age – directed by Shekhar Kapur; The Diving Bell and the Butterfly – directed by Julian Schnabel
Best Foreign Film: No Country for Old Men – directed by Coen brothers; Across the Universe – directed by Julie Taymor; Into the Wild – directed by Sean Penn; In the Valley of Elah – directed by Paul Haggis; There Will Be Blood – directed by Paul Thomas Anderson	David Youth Award: Parlami d'amore – directed by Silvio Muccino; The Right Distance – directed by Carlo Mazzacurati; Lessons in Chocolate – directed by Claudio Cupellini; Piano, solo – directed by Riccardo Milani; I Viceré – directed by Roberto Faenza
Special David Awards: Carlo Verdone; Luigi Magni; Gabriele Muccino
