= 55th David di Donatello =

2010 Italian film awards

- Date: 7 May 2010
- Site: Auditorium Conciliazione, Rome, Italy
- Hosted by: Tullio Solenghi

Highlights
- Best Picture: The Man Who Will Come
- Most awards: Vincere (8)
- Most nominations: The First Beautiful Thing (18)

The 55th David di Donatello ceremony, presented by the Accademia del Cinema Italiano, was held on 7 May 2010.

== Winners and nominees ==
Best Film: The Man Who Will Come – directed by Giorgio Diritti; Baarìa – directed by Giuseppe Tornatore; The First Beautiful Thing – directed by Paolo Virzì; Loose Cannons – directed by Ferzan Özpetek; Vincere – directed by Marco Bellocchio	Best Producer: Simone Bachini, Giorgio Diritti – The Man Who Will Come; Giampaolo Letta, Mario Spedaletti – Baarìa; Angelo Barbagallo, Gianluca Curti – Fort Apache Napoli; Domenico Procacci – Loose Cannons; Mario Gianani – Vincere
Best Director: Marco Bellocchio – Vincere; Giuseppe Tornatore – Baarìa; Giorgio Diritti – The Man Who Will Come; Paolo Virzì – The First Beautiful Thing; Ferzan Özpetek – Loose Cannons	Best New Director: Valerio Mieli – Ten Winters; Susanna Nicchiarelli – Cosmonaut; Claudio Noce – Good Morning Aman; Marco Chiarini – L'uomo fiammifero; Giuseppe Capotondi – The Double Hour
Best Actor: Valerio Mastandrea – The First Beautiful Thing; Antonio Albanese – A Question of the Heart; Libero De Rienzo – Fort Apache Napoli; Kim Rossi Stuart – A Question of the Heart; Filippo Timi – Vincere	Best Actress: Micaela Ramazzotti – The First Beautiful Thing; Greta Zuccheri Montanari – The Man Who Will Come; Stefania Sandrelli – The First Beautiful Thing; Margherita Buy – The White Space; Giovanna Mezzogiorno – Vincere'
Best Supporting Actor: Ennio Fantastichini – Loose Cannons; The whole cast of supporting actors – Baarìa; Pierfrancesco Favino – Kiss Me Again; Marco Giallini – Io, loro e Lara; Marco Messeri – The First Beautiful Thing	Best Supporting Actress: Ilaria Occhini – Loose Cannons; Anita Kravos – Raise Your Head; Alba Rohrwacher – The Man Who Will Come; Claudia Pandolfi – The First Beautiful Thing; Elena Sofia Ricci – Loose Cannons
David di Donatello for Best Screenplay: Francesco Bruni, Francesco Piccolo, Paolo Virzì – The First Beautiful Thing; Jim Carrington, Andrea Purgatori, Marco Risi, Maurizio Cerino – Fort Apache Napoli; Giorgio Diritti, Giovanni Galavotti, Tania Pedroni – The Man Who Will Come; Ivan Cotroneo, Ferzan Özpetek – Loose Cannons; Marco Bellocchio, Daniela Ceselli – Vincere	Best Cinematography: Daniele Ciprì – Vincere; Enrico Lucidi – Baarìa; Roberto Cimatti – The Man Who Will Come; Nicola Pecorini – The First Beautiful Thing; Maurizio Calvesi – Loose Cannons
Best Production Design: Marco Dentici – Vincere; Maurizio Sabatini – Baarìa; Giancarlo Basili – The Man Who Will Come; Tonino Zera – The First Beautiful Thing; Andrea Crisanti – Loose Cannons	Best Score: Ennio Morricone – Baarìa; Marco Biscarini, Daniele Furlati – The Man Who Will Come; Carlo Virzì – The First Beautiful Thing; Pasquale Catalano – Loose Cannons; Carlo Crivelli – Vincere
Best Original Song: "Baciami ancora" from Kiss Me Again – Composed and performed by Jovanotti; "Angela" from Cado dalle nubi – Composed and performed by Checco Zalone; "21st Century Boy" from The First Beautiful Thing – Composed by Valerio Casini, performed by Bad Love Experience; "'Sogno" from Loose Cannons – Composed by Marco Giacomelli, Fabio Petrillo, Ilaria Cortese, performed by Patty Pravo; "Canzone in prigione" from Tutta colpa di Giuda – Composed by Cristiano Godano, Gian Luca Bergia, Riccardo Tesio, performed by Marlene Kuntz	Best Editing: Francesca Calvelli – Vincere; Massimo Quaglia – Baarìa; Giorgio Diritti, Paolo Marzoni – The Man Who Will Come; Simone Manetti – The First Beautiful Thing; Patrizio Marone – Loose Cannons
Best Sound: Carlo Missidenti – The Man Who Will Come; Faouzi Thabet – Baarìa; Bruno Pupparo – Parents and Children: Shake Well Before Using; Mario Iaquone – The First Beautiful Thing; Gaetano Carito – Vincere	Best Costumes: Sergio Ballo – Vincere; Luigi Bonanno – Baarìa; Lia Francesca Morandini – The Man Who Will Come; Gabriella Pescucci – The First Beautiful Thing; Alessandro Lai – Loose Cannons
Best Special Visual Effects: Paola Trisoglio, Stefano Marinoni – Vincere; Mario Zanot – Baarìa; LIMINA – The Man Who Will Come; Ermanno Di Nicola – L'uomo fiammifero; EDI – Effetti Digitali Italiani – The First Beautiful Thing	Best Make-up Artist: Franco Corridoni – Vincere; Gino Zamprioli – Baarìa; Amel Ben Soltane – The Man Who Will Come; Paola Gattabrusi – The First Beautiful Thing; Luigi Rocchetti, Erzsébet Forgács – Mi Ricordo Anna Frank
Best Hairstylist: Alberta Giuliani – Vincere; Giusy Bovino – Baarìa; Aldo Signoretti, Susana Sanchez Nunez – I, Don Giovanni; Daniela Tartari – The Man Who Will Come; Massimo Gattabrusi – The First Beautiful Thing	Best Documentary Feature: The Mouth of the Wolf – directed by Pietro Marcello; Hollywood on the Tiber – directed by Marco Spagnoli; L'isola dei sordobimbi – directed by Stefano Cattini; The One Man Beatles – directed by Cosimo Messeri; Valentina Postika in attesa di partire – directed by Caterina Carone
Best Short Film: Passing Time – directed by Laura Bispuri; L'altra metà – directed by Pippo Mezzapesa; Buonanotte – directed by Riccardo Banfi; Nuvole, mani – directed by Simone Massi; Uerra – directed by Paolo Sassanelli	Best European Film: Le Concert – directed by Radu Mihăileanu; The White Ribbon – directed by Michael Haneke; A Prophet – directed by Jacques Audiard; Soul Kitchen – directed by Fatih Akın; Welcome – directed by Philippe Lioret
Best Foreign Film: Inglourious Basterds – directed by Quentin Tarantino; A Serious Man – directed by Coen brothers; Avatar – directed by James Cameron; Invictus – directed by Clint Eastwood; Up in the Air – directed by Jason Reitman	David Youth Award: Baarìa – directed by Giuseppe Tornatore; Kiss Me Again – directed by Gabriele Muccino; Parents and Children: Shake Well Before Using – directed by Giovanni Veronesi; Io, loro e Lara – directed by Carlo Verdone; The Man Who Will Come – directed by Giorgio Diritti
Special David Awards: Lina Wertmüller, Career David; Bud Spencer, Career David; Terence Hill, Career David; Tonino Guerra, Career David
