= David di Donatello for Best Film =

Italian film award

David di Donatello Award for Best Film
- Awarded for: Best Film of the Year
- Country: Italy
- Presented by: Accademia del Cinema Italiano (ACI)
- First award: 1970; 56 years ago (for the films released during the 1969/1970 film season)
- Most recent winner: Vermiglio (2024)
- Website: daviddidonatello.it

The David di Donatello Award for Best Film (Italian: David di Donatello per il miglior film) is one of the David di Donatello awards presented annually by the Accademia del Cinema Italiano (ACI). The award recognizes the most outstanding Italian film theatrically released in Italy during the year preceding the ceremony. The award was first given in 1970, and became competitive in 1981.

Nominees and winners are selected via runoff voting by all the members of the Accademia.

== Winners and nominees ==
Below, winners are listed first in the colored row, followed by other nominees.

=== 1970s ===
Year	Film	Producer(s)	Ref.
1969/70 (15th)
1969/70 (15th)	Investigation of a Citizen Above Suspicion	Marina Cicogna and Daniele Senatore	
1969/70 (15th)	Metello	Gianni Hecht Lucari	
1970/71 (16th)
1970/71 (16th)	The Conformist	Maurizio Lodi-Fè	
1970/71 (16th)	The Garden of the Finzi-Continis	Artur Brauner, Arthur Cohn, and Gianni Hecht Lucari	
1970/71 (16th)	Waterloo	Dino De Laurentiis	
1971/72 (17th)
1971/72 (17th)	This Kind of Love	Mario Cecchi Gori	
1971/72 (17th)	The Working Class Goes to Heaven		
1972/73 (18th)
1972/73 (18th)	Alfredo, Alfredo	Guglielmo Colonna	
1972/73 (18th)	Ludwig	Ugo Santalucia and Dieter Geissler	
1973/74 (19th)
1973/74 (19th)	Amarcord	Franco Cristaldi	
1973/74 (19th)	Bread and Chocolate	Maurizio Lodi-Fè	
1974/75 (20th)
1974/75 (20th)	Conversation Piece	Giovanni Bertolucci	
1974/75 (20th)	Drama of the Rich	Giovanni Di Clemente	
1975/76 (21st)
1975/76 (21st)	Illustrious Corpses	Alberto Grimaldi	
1976/77 (22nd)
1976/77 (22nd)	An Average Little Man	Aurelio De Laurentiis and Luigi De Laurentiis	
1976/77 (22nd)	The Desert of the Tartars	Michelle de Broca, Bahman Farmanara, Mario Gallo, Enzo Giulioli, Jacques Perrin, and Giorgio Silvagni	
1977/78 (23rd)
1977/78 (23rd)	In the Name of the Pope King	Franco Committeri	
1977/78 (23rd)	I Am the Law	Gianni Hecht Lucari	
1978/79 (24th)
1978/79 (24th)	Christ Stopped at Eboli	Nicola Carraro and Franco Cristaldi	
1978/79 (24th)	To Forget Venice	Franco Brusati and Claudio Grassetti	
1978/79 (24th)	The Tree of Wooden Clogs		

=== 1980s ===
Year	Film	Producer(s)	Ref.
1980/81 (26th)
1980/81 (26th)	I'm Starting from Three	Mauro Berardi	
1980/81 (26th)	Passion of Love	Franco Committeri	
1980/81 (26th)	Three Brothers	Giorgio Nocella and Antonio Macrì	
1981/82 (27th)
1981/82 (27th)	Talcum Powder	Mario Cecchi Gori and Vittorio Cecchi Gori	
1981/82 (27th)	Il marchese del Grillo	Renzo Rossellini	
1981/82 (27th)	Tales of Ordinary Madness	Jacqueline Ferreri	
1982/83 (28th)
1982/83 (28th)	The Night of the Shooting Stars	Giuliani G. De Negri	
1982/83 (28th)	Blow to the Heart	Enzo Porcelli	
1982/83 (28th)	That Night in Varennes	Renzo Rossellini	
1983/84 (29th)
1983/84 (29th)	And the Ship Sails On	Franco Cristaldi	
1983/84 (29th)	Le Bal	Mohammed Lakhdar-Hamina and Giorgio Silvagni	
1983/84 (29th)	Where's Picone?	Antonio Avati and Gianni Minervini	
1984/85 (30th)
1984/85 (30th)	Carmen	Marcel Dassault, Patrice Ledoux, and Alain Poiré	
1984/85 (30th)	Kaos	Giuliani G. De Negri	
1984/85 (30th)	A Proper Scandal	Fulvio Lucisano	
1985/86 (31st)
1985/86 (31st)	Let's Hope It's a Girl	Giovanni Di Clemente	
1985/86 (31st)	Ginger and Fred	Alberto Grimaldi and Heinz Bibo	
1985/86 (31st)	The Mass Is Ended	Achille Manzotti	
1986/87 (32nd)
1986/87 (32nd)	The Family	Franco Committeri	
1986/87 (32nd)	Christmas Present	Antonio Avati	
1986/87 (32nd)	A Tale of Love	Carlo Tuzii	
1987/88 (33rd)
1987/88 (33rd)	The Last Emperor§	Jeremy Thomas	
1987/88 (33rd)	Dark Eyes	Carlo Cucchi and Silvia D'Amico Bendicò	
1987/88 (33rd)	Intervista	Ibrahim Moussa	
1988/89 (34th)
1988/89 (34th)	The Legend of the Holy Drinker	Roberto Cicutto and Vincenzo Di Leo	
1988/89 (34th)	Cinema Paradiso	Franco Cristaldi and Giovanna Romagnoli	
1988/89 (34th)	Francesco	Roberta Cadringher, Giulio Scanni, and Jost Steinbruchel	

=== 1990s ===
Year	Film	Producer(s)	Ref.
1989/90 (35th)
1989/90 (35th)	Open Doors	Angelo Rizzoli Jr.	
1989/90 (35th)	Dark Illness	Giovanni Di Clemente	
1989/90 (35th)	Red Wood Pigeon	Nella Banfi, Angelo Barbagallo, and Nanni Moretti	
1989/90 (35th)	The Story of Boys & Girls	Antonio Avati, Pupi Avati, Emanuela Guzzardi, Giorgio Leopardi, and Gianfranco Piccioli	
1989/90 (35th)	The Voice of the Moon	Mario Cecchi Gori and Vittorio Cecchi Gori	
1990/91 (36th)
1990/91 (36th)	Mediterraneo	Silvio Berlusconi, Mario Cecchi Gori, Vittorio Cecchi Gori, and Gianni Minervini	
1990/91 (36th)	Towards Evening	Guido De Laurentiis and Leo Pescarolo	
1990/91 (36th)	The House of Smiles	Augusto Caminito and Giovanna Romagnoli	
1990/91 (36th)	The Station	Domenico Procacci	
1990/91 (36th)	The Yes Man	Angelo Barbagallo and Nanni Moretti	
1991/92 (37th)
1991/92 (37th)	The Stolen Children	Stefano Mufanò and Angelo Rizzoli Jr.	
1991/92 (37th)	Damned the Day I Met You	Mario Cecchi Gori and Vittorio Cecchi Gori	
1991/92 (37th)	The Invisible Wall	Mario Cecchi Gori, Vittorio Cecchi Gori, and Maurizio Tedesco	
1992/93 (38th)
1992/93 (38th)	The Great Pumpkin	Guido De Laurentiis, Fulvio Lucisano, and Leo Pescarolo	
1992/93 (38th)	The Escort	Claudio Bonivento	
1992/93 (38th)	Jonah Who Lived in the Whale	Gianna Bellavia, Elda Ferri, Áron Sipos, and Dénes Szekeres	
1993/94 (39th)
1993/94 (39th)	Caro diario	Nella Banfi, Angelo Barbagallo, and Nanni Moretti	
1993/94 (39th)	For Love, Only for Love	Aurelio De Laurentiis	
1993/94 (39th)	Let's Not Keep in Touch	Vittorio Cecchi Gori	
1994/95 (40th)
1994/95 (40th)	La scuola	Vittorio Cecchi Gori	
1994/95 (40th)	Nasty Love	Angelo Curti, Andrea Occhipinti, and Kermit Smith	
1994/95 (40th)	Il Postino: The Postman*	Mario Cecchi Gori, Vittorio Cecchi Gori, and Gaetano Daniele	
1995/96 (41st)
1995/96 (41st)	August Vacation	Vittorio Cecchi Gori and Rita Cecchi Gori	
1995/96 (41st)	Celluloide	Pio Angeletti and Adriano De Micheli	
1995/96 (41st)	The Star Maker	Vittorio Cecchi Gori and Rita Cecchi Gori	
1995/96 (41st)	Stealing Beauty	Jeremy Thomas	
1996/97 (42nd)
1996/97 (42nd)	The Truce	Véra Belmont, Guido De Laurentiis, and Leo Pescarolo	
1996/97 (42nd)	The Cyclone	Vittorio Cecchi Gori and Rita Cecchi Gori	
1996/97 (42nd)	Marianna Ucrìa	Vittorio Cecchi Gori, Elda Ferri, and Rita Cecchi Gori	
1996/97 (42nd)	My Generation	Maurizio Tini	
1996/97 (42nd)	Nirvana	Vittorio Cecchi Gori, Rita Cecchi Gori, and Maurizio Totti	
1997/98 (43rd)
1997/98 (43rd)	Life Is Beautiful*	Gianluigi Braschi and Elda Ferri	
1997/98 (43rd)	Ovosodo	Vittorio Cecchi Gori and Rita Cecchi Gori	
1997/98 (43rd)	April	Angelo Barbagallo and Nanni Moretti	
1998/99 (44th)
1998/99 (44th)	Not of this World	Lionello Cerri	
1998/99 (44th)	Besieged	Massimo Cortesi	
1998/99 (44th)	The Legend of 1900	Francesco Tornatore	

=== 2000s ===
Year	Film	Producer(s)	Ref.
1999/00 (45th)
1999/00 (45th)	Bread and Tulips	Daniele Maggioni	
1999/00 (45th)	Canone inverso	Vittorio Cecchi Gori	
1999/00 (45th)	Olympic Garage	Marco Bechis, Amedeo Pagani, and Enrique Piñeyro	
2000/01 (46th)
2000/01 (46th)	The Son's Room	Angelo Barbagallo, Federico Fabrizio, Vincenzo Galluzzo, Lorenzo Luccarini, and Nanni Moretti	
2000/01 (46th)	The Last Kiss	Domenico Procacci	
2000/01 (46th)	One Hundred Steps	Fabrizio Mosca	
2001/02 (47th)
2001/02 (47th)	The Profession of Arms	Roberto Cicutto and Luigi Musini	
2001/02 (47th)	Burning in the Wind	Lionello Cerri and Luigi Musini	
2001/02 (47th)	Light of My Eyes	Lionello Cerri	
2002/03 (48th)
2002/03 (48th)	Facing Windows	Tilde Corsi and Gianni Romoli	
2002/03 (48th)	The Embalmer	Domenico Procacci	
2002/03 (48th)	My Mother's Smile	Marco Bellocchio and Sergio Pelone	
2002/03 (48th)	Remember Me, My Love	Domenico Procacci	
2002/03 (48th)	Respiro	Domenico Procacci	
2003/04 (49th)
2003/04 (49th)	The Best of Youth	Angelo Barbagallo and Donatella Botti	
2003/04 (49th)	Don't Move	Marco Chimenz, Giovanni Stabilini, and Riccardo Tozzi	
2003/04 (49th)	Good Morning, Night	Marco Bellocchio and Sergio Pelone	
2003/04 (49th)	I'm Not Scared	Marco Chimenz, Giovanni Stabilini, Maurizio Totti, and Riccardo Tozzi	
2003/04 (49th)	What Will Happen to Us?	Aurelio De Laurentiis	
2004/05 (50th)
2004/05 (50th)	The Consequences of Love	Francesca Cima, Angelo Curti, Nicola Giuliano, and Domenico Procacci	
2004/05 (50th)	A Children's Story	Rosario Rinaldo	
2004/05 (50th)	Sacred Heart	Tilde Corsi and Gianni Romoli	
2004/05 (50th)	The Keys to the House	Enzo Porcelli	
2004/05 (50th)	Manual of Love	Aurelio De Laurentiis	
2005/06 (51st)
2005/06 (51st)	The Caiman	Angelo Barbagallo and Nanni Moretti	
2005/06 (51st)	My Best Enemy	Aurelio De Laurentiis	
2005/06 (51st)	Notte prima degli esami	Federica Lucisano, Fulvio Lucisano, and Giannandrea Pecorelli	
2005/06 (51st)	Our Land	Domenico Procacci	
2005/06 (51st)	Romanzo criminale		
2006/07 (52nd)
2006/07 (52nd)	The Unknown Woman		
2006/07 (52nd)	Along the Ridge	Carlo Degli Esposti, Giorgio Magliulo, and Andrea Costantini	
2006/07 (52nd)	My Brother is an Only Child	Marco Chimenz, Giovanni Stabilini, and Riccardo Tozzi	
2006/07 (52nd)	Nuovomondo	Alexandre Mallet-Guy and Fabrizio Mosca	
2006/07 (52nd)	One Hundred Nails	Roberto Cicutto and Luigi Musini	
2007/08 (53rd)
2007/08 (53rd)	The Girl by the Lake	Francesca Cima and Nicola Giuliano	
2007/08 (53rd)	Days and Clouds	Lionello Cerri	
2007/08 (53rd)	Quiet Chaos	Domenico Procacci	
2007/08 (53rd)	The Right Distance	Domenico Procacci	
2007/08 (53rd)	The Wind Blows Round	Simone Bachini, Mario Chemello, Giorgio Diritti, and Roberto Passuti	
2008/09 (54th)
2008/09 (54th)	Gomorrah	Domenico Procacci	
2008/09 (54th)	Il Divo	Francesca Cima, Nicola Giuliano, and Andrea Occhipinti	
2008/09 (54th)	Many Kisses Later	Federica Lucisano and Fulvio Lucisano	
2008/09 (54th)	We Can Do That	Andrea Rizzoli Jr. and Angelo Rizzoli Jr.	
2008/09 (54th)	Your Whole Life Ahead of You	Paolo Virzì	

=== 2010s ===
Year	Film	Producer(s)	Ref.
2009/10 (55th)
2009/10 (55th)	The Man Who Will Come	Simone Bachini and Giorgio Diritti	
2009/10 (55th)	Baarìa	Tarak Ben Ammar	
2009/10 (55th)	The First Beautiful Thing	Marco Cohen, Fabrizio Donvito, Benedetto Habib, Carlo Virzì, and Paolo Virzì	
2009/10 (55th)	Loose Cannons	Domenico Procacci	
2009/10 (55th)	Vincere	Mario Gianani	
2010/11 (56th)
2010/11 (56th)	We Believed	Conchita Airoldi, Carlo Degli Esposti, and Giorgio Magliulo	
2010/11 (56th)	Basilicata Coast to Coast	Isabella Cocuzza, Mark Lombardo, Elisabetta Olmi, and Arturo Paglia	
2010/11 (56th)	Benvenuti al Sud	Marco Chimenz, Giovanni Stabilini, Francesca Longardi, and Riccardo Tozzi	
2010/11 (56th)	La nostra vita	Marco Chimenz, Fabio Conversi, Giovanni Stabilini, and Riccardo Tozzi	
2010/11 (56th)	A Quiet Life	Fabrizio Mosca and Christer von Lindequist	
2011/12 (57th)
2011/12 (57th)	Caesar Must Die	Grazia Volpi	
2011/12 (57th)	Piazza Fontana: The Italian Conspiracy	Marco Chimenz, Giovanni Stabilini, and Riccardo Tozzi	
2011/12 (57th)	Terraferma	Marco Chimenz, Fabio Conversi, Giovanni Stabilini, and Riccardo Tozzi	
2011/12 (57th)	This Must Be the Place	Francesca Cima, Nicola Giuliano, and Andrea Occhipinti	
2011/12 (57th)	We Have a Pope	Jean Labadie, Nanni Moretti, and Domenico Procacci	
2012/13 (58th)
2012/13 (58th)	The Best Offer	Isabella Cocuzza and Arturo Paglia	
2012/13 (58th)	Diaz – Don't Clean Up This Blood	Domenico Procacci	
2012/13 (58th)	Long Live Freedom	Angelo Barbagallo	
2012/13 (58th)	Me and You	Mario Gianani and Lorenzo Mieli	
2012/13 (58th)	Siberian Education	Marco Chimenz, Gina Gardini, Giovanni Stabilini, and Riccardo Tozzi	
2013/14 (59th)
2013/14 (59th)	Human Capital	Marco Cohen and Benedetto Habib	
2013/14 (59th)	The Chair of Happiness	Angelo Barbagallo	
2013/14 (59th)	The Great Beauty	Francesca Cima and Nicola Giuliano	
2013/14 (59th)	I Can Quit Whenever I Want	Andrea Paris, Domenico Procacci, and Matteo Rovere	
2013/14 (59th)	The Mafia Kills Only in the Summer	Fausto Brizzi, Mario Gianani, and Lorenzo Mieli	
2014/15 (60th)
2014/15 (60th)	Black Souls	Luigi Musini and Olivia Musini	
2014/15 (60th)	Greenery Will Bloom Again	Luigi Musini and Elisabetta Olmi	
2014/15 (60th)	Hungry Hearts	Mario Gianani and Lorenzo Mieli	
2014/15 (60th)	Leopardi	Carlo Degli Esposti, Margherita Murolo, and Nicola Serra	
2014/15 (60th)	Mia madre	Nanni Moretti and Domenico Procacci	
2015/16 (61st)
2015/16 (61st)	Perfect Strangers	Marco Belardi	
2015/16 (61st)	Don't Be Bad	Paolo Bogna, Simone Isola, and Valerio Mastandrea	
2015/16 (61st)	Fire at Sea	Roberto Cicutto, Paolo Del Brocco, Camille Laemlé, Serge Lalou, Donatella Palermo, Gianfranco Rosi, and Martine Saada	
2015/16 (61st)	Tale of Tales	Matteo Garrone, Anne-Laure Labadie, Jean Labadie, and Jeremy Thomas	
2015/16 (61st)	Youth	Carlotta Calori, Francesca Cima, and Nicola Giuliano	
2016 (62nd)
2016 (62nd)	Like Crazy	Marco Belardi	
2016 (62nd)	Fiore	Beppe Caschetto and Rita Rognoni	
2016 (62nd)	Indivisible	Attilio De Razza e Pierpaolo Verga	
2016 (62nd)	Italian Race	Domenico Procacci	
2016 (62nd)	Sweet Dreams	Beppe Caschetto	
2017 (63rd)
2017 (63rd)	Love and Bullets	Carlo Macchitella and Manetti Bros.	
2017 (63rd)	A Ciambra	Paolo Carpignano, Jon Coplon, Christoph Daniel, Gwyn Sannia, Marc Schmidheiny, and Rodrigo Teixeira	
2017 (63rd)	Cinderella the Cat	Luciano Stella and Maria Carolina Terzi	
2017 (63rd)	Nico, 1988	Valérie Bournonville, Marta Donzelli, Gregorio Paonessa, and Joseph Rouschop	
2017 (63rd)	Tenderness	Agostino Saccá, Giuseppe Saccá, and Maria Grazia Saccá	
2018 (64th)
2018 (64th)	Dogman	Paolo Del Brocco, Matteo Garrone, Jean Labadie, and Jeremy Thomas	
2018 (64th)	Call Me By Your Name*	Emilie Georges, Luca Guadagnino, James Ivory, Marco Morabito, Howard Rosenman, Peter Spears, and Rodrigo Teixeira	
2018 (64th)	Euphoria	Viola Prestieri	
2018 (64th)	Happy as Lazzaro	Carlo Cresto-Dina, Gregory Gajos, Arthur Hallereau, Alexandra Henochsberg, Pierre-François Piet, Tiziana Soudani, and Michael Weber	
2018 (64th)	On My Skin	Luigi Musini, Olivia Musini, and Andrea Occhipinti	
2019 (65th)
2019 (65th)	The Traitor	IBC Movie, Kavac Film, and Rai Cinema	
2019 (65th)	Martin Eden	Pietro Marcello, Beppe Caschetto, Thomas Ordonneau, Michael Weber, Viola Fügen, and Rai Cinema	
2019 (65th)	Pinocchio	Archimede, Rai Cinema, and Le Pacte	
2019 (65th)	Piranhas	Carlo Degli Esposti and Nicola Serra	
2019 (65th)	The First King: Birth of an Empire	Groenlandia, Gapbusters, Rai Cinema and Roman Citizen	

=== 2020s ===
Year	Film	Producer(s)	Ref.
2020 (66th)
2020 (66th)	Hidden Away	Carlo Degli Esposti, Nicola Serra	
2020 (66th)	Bad Tales	Agostino Saccà, Giuseppe Saccà, Rai Cinema	
2020 (66th)	Hammamet	Agostino Saccà, Maria Grazia Saccà	
2020 (66th)	The Macaluso Sisters	Marica Stocchi, Marta Donzelli	
2020 (66th)	Miss Marx		
2021 (67th)
2021 (67th)	The Hand of God		
2021 (67th)	Ennio		
2021 (67th)	Freaks Out		
2021 (67th)	The Inner Cage		
2021 (67th)	The King of Laughter		
2022 (68th)
2022 (68th)	The Eight Mountains		
2022 (68th)	Exterior Night		
2022 (68th)	Lord of the Ants		
2022 (68th)	Nostalgia		
2022 (68th)	Strangeness		
2023 (69th)
2023 (69th)	Io capitano		
2023 (69th)	A Brighter Tomorrow		
2023 (69th)	La chimera		
2023 (69th)	Kidnapped		
2023 (69th)	There's Still Tomorrow		
2024 (70th)
2024 (70th)	Vermiglio		
2024 (70th)	Parthenope		
2024 (70th)	The Art of Joy		
2024 (70th)	The Great Ambition		
2024 (70th)	The Time It Takes		
2025 (71st)
2025 (71st)	The Last One for the Road		
2025 (71st)	The Tasters		
2025 (71st)	Five Seconds		
2025 (71st)	Fuori		
2025 (71st)	La grazia		

== See also ==
- Nastro d'Argento
- Academy Award for Best Picture
- Academy Award for Best Foreign Language Film (list of submissions)
- Cinema of Italy
