= The Condemned of Altona (film) =

1962 film

- Film poster
- Directed by: Vittorio De Sica
- Written by: Jean-Paul Sartre (play); Abby Mann; Cesare Zavattini
- Produced by: Carlo Ponti
- Starring: Sophia Loren; Maximilian Schell
- Cinematography: Roberto Gerardi
- Music by: Dmitry Shostakovich
- Distributed by: Titanus (Italy)
- Release date: 30 October 1962
- Running time: 114 minutes
- Countries: Italy; France
- Language: English
- Box office: $1.1 million (US/ Canada rentals)

The Condemned of Altona (Italian: I sequestrati di Altona) is a 1962 Italian-French drama film directed by Vittorio De Sica. It is based on the play of the same name by Jean-Paul Sartre. For this film Vittorio De Sica won the Academy of Italian Cinema's David di Donatello award for Best Director.

== Plot ==
The industrialist Albrecht von Gerlach realizes he's close to death and summons his son Werner, a lawyer, whom he wants to appoint as his successor. Werner hesitates because he knows their family firm supported Nazism, leading to the execution of his brother Franz for war crimes. Meanwhile, Werner's wife Johanna, an actress involved in an anti-Nazi play by Brecht, discovers Franz is alive and hiding in their family home in Altona. She paints a bleak picture of Germany, still struggling after the war.

Franz's meeting with Johanna changes his perspective as he learns of Germany's divided state, one part rebuilt while the other languishes. Leaving his hiding spot, he explores the city to confront the truth. In a tragic twist, he and his father meet their end, falling from the scaffolding of the Gerlach shipyard.

== Cast ==
- Sophia Loren as Johanna
- Maximilian Schell as Franz
- Fredric March as Albrecht von Gerlach
- Robert Wagner as Werner von Gerlach
- Françoise Prévost as Leni von Gerlach
- Alfredo Franchi as Groundskeeper
- Lucia Pelella as Groundskeeper's wife
- Roberto Massa as Chauffeur
- Antonia Cianci as Maid
- Carlo Antonini as Police Official
- Armando Sifo as Policeman
- Osvaldo Peccioli as Cook
- Ekkehard Schall

== Music and Art ==
The music used in the film is from the third movement, "Eternal Memory," of Symphony No. 11 ("The Year 1905") by Dmitri Shostakovich. The drawings on the walls of Franz's room are by the Sicilian artist Renato Guttuso.
