= There Will Come a Day (film) =

2013 film directed by Giorgio Diritti

- Directed by: Giorgio Diritti
- Starring: Jasmine Trinca; Anne Alvaro; Pia Engleberth
- Cinematography: Roberto Cimatti
- Release date: 2013
- Running time: 109 minutes
- Country: Italy
- Language: Italian

There Will Come a Day (Italian: Un giorno devi andare) is a 2013 Italian drama film directed by Giorgio Diritti. It premiered at the 2013 Sundance Film Festival. For her performance Jasmine Trinca won the Nastro d'Argento for Best Actress.

== Cast ==
- Jasmine Trinca as Augusta
- Anne Alvaro as Anna
- Pia Engleberth as Suor Franca
- Sonia Gessner as Antonia
- Amanda Fonseca Galvao as Janaina
- Paulo De Souza as Joao
- Eder Frota Dos Santos as Nilson
