= Andrea Mozzali =

Italian painter (1895–1977)

Andrea Mozzali (Guastalla 1895–Poviglio 1977) was an Italian sculptor, restorer and painter.

== Biography ==
Andrea Mozzali was a student and collaborator of Alceo Dossena in Parma and Accademia di Belle Arti di Roma. He worked as sculptor in Mossina palace (formerly the Ducal Palace of Guastalla ) and on other commissions. He created busts of historical figures, such as Ferrante Gonzaga, Isabella di Capua, Lucrezia Borgia, and public monuments, including one commemorating casualties of the Great War in San Girolamo di Guastalla. After taking part in World War I, he married Luigia Maria Olga Rizzi (1895-1947) and settled in Guastalla on Via Martiri di Belfiore, where he founded the "Pia cantina di San Francese" with other friends, artists, and writers in 1933. In 1939 he presented his works at the 1st Art Exhibition at the Technical Institute of Guastalla. During the interwar period, Mozzali devoted himself to restoration, classical sculpture, and cemetery tombstones for churches in the province of Reggio Emilia and Brescia. His son Guido died in the second half of the 1940s. In the following decades, Mozzali continued to exhibit his paintings, including at: Galleria S. Babila in Milan with Ligabue and Bruno Rovesti in 1959; the Casa d'arte di Guastalla in 1962, 1965, and 1966; and subsequently in Luzzara, Biella, Correggio, Mirandola, Brescia, Palazzolo sull'Oglio, Suzzara, Mantua, Bologna, Prato, Ancona, Rome, Reggio Emilia and abroad in Lugano and Zagabria.

Mozzali is known for his friendship with Antonio Ligabue, who considered Mozzali his only "friend." In 1941 Mozzali hosted Ligabue in his home in Guastalla after securing the latter's release from a psychiatric hospital.

== Artwork ==
Mozzali's works prior to 1930 are academic, influenced by his master Alceo Dossena. In the following decade, he devoted himself above all to the creation of sculptures for funeral and religious commissions, which incorporated Renaissance influences. Starting in the mid-1950s, Mozzali shifted his thematic focus to social commentary and village life.

== Works ==
- "Band concert in a square". Oil on canvas. Suzzara (MN), Galleria Civica d'Arte Contemporanea.
- "Male portrait". Drawing on card. National museum naives Cesare Zavattini, Luzzara (RE).
- "Child". Limestone sculpture. National museum naives Zavattini, Luzzara (RE).
- "Monuments for dead soldiers of the Great War". San Girolamo di Guastalla (RE).
- "Via Crucis in modeled terracotta". Church of Bobbio (Piacenza).
- "Bronze mask of Antonio Ligabue on his tomb". Cemetery of Gualtieri (RE).
- "Terracotta reliefs and marble statues of saints on the facade". Chiesa dei Santi Filippo e Giacomo, Guastalla (RE).
- "Ferrante I Gonzaga triumphant over Envy", bronze statue, Civic Gallery, Guastalla (RE).
- "Landscape", Oil on canvas, Galleria d'arte moderna Aroldo Bonzagni, Cento (FE).
- "Interior", Oil on canvas, Pinacoteca civica "M. Moretti", Civitanova Marche Alta (MC).
- "Two kneeling angels in adoration of the Cross", marble relief for the tomb of Francesco Scaravelli, Guastalla Cemetery.
- "Butcher", Oil on canvas.
