= Hidden Away (2020 film) =

2020 film

- Theatrical release poster
- Directed by: Giorgio Diritti
- Screenplay by: Giorgio Diritti; Tania Pedroni
- Story by: Giorgio Diritti; Fredo Valla
- Produced by: Carlo Degli Esposti; Nicola Serra
- Starring: Elio Germano
- Cinematography: Matteo Cocco
- Edited by: Paolo Cottignola; Giorgio Diritti
- Music by: Marco Biscarini; Daniele Furlati
- Production companies: Palomar; Rai Cinema
- Distributed by: 01 Distribution
- Release date: 21 February 2020 (Berlinale)
- Running time: 120 minutes
- Country: Italy
- Language: Italian

Hidden Away (Italian: Volevo nascondermi, lit. 'I Wanted to Hide') is a 2020 Italian biographical drama film co-written, directed and co-edited by Giorgio Diritti. It stars Elio Germano as Italian painter Antonio Ligabue, who lived a notoriously reclusive life, troubled with physical problems and mental illness.

It was selected to compete for the Golden Bear in the main competition section at the 70th Berlin International Film Festival. At Berlin, Elio Germano won the Silver Bear for Best Actor.

== Plot ==
The story of the painter Antonio Ligabue, with flashbacks showing glimpses of his childhood and his Swiss-Italian origins. Little Antonio is entrusted to adoptive parents and immediately begins to have psychophysical disorders, ill with rickets, and after being expelled from school and attacking his mother, he is hospitalized several times in an asylum.

But at the same time, Antonio finds comfort in painting and sculpture, often depicting exotic animals, such as lions, horses, gorillas, tigers, which he unites with the Emilian landscape, as Antonio will move to Gualtieri in Emilia, where he is derogatively called "El Tudesc" (The German).

However, Ligabue is soon discovered by the critic Renato Marino Mazzacurati, who encourages him to continue with his works, and to participate in art exhibitions and conferences in the province, until Ligabue is slowly discovered and appreciated by critics, although branded by certain academics as a naïve artist.

== Cast ==
- Elio Germano as Antonio 'Toni' Ligabue
  - Oliver Ewy as young Antonio Ligabue
  - Leonardo Carrozzo as Antonio Ligabue as a child
- Pietro Traldi as Renato Marino Mazzacurati
- Orietta Notari as Mazzacurati's mother
- Andrea Gherpelli as Andrea Mozzali
- Denis Campitelli as Nerone
- Filippo Marchi as Vandino
- Maurizio Pagliari as Sassi
- Francesca Manfredini as Cesarina
- Daniela Rossi as Cesarina's mother
- Mario Perrotta as Raffaele Andreassi
- Paolo Dallasta as Erminio Canova
- Gianni Fantoni as Antonini
- Paola Lavini as Pina

== Release ==
The film premiered in competition at the 70th Berlin International Film Festival on 21 February 2020. The film was scheduled to be released in Italy on 27 February 2020, by 01 Distribution, but it was indefinitely postponed due to the coronavirus outbreak in the country.

== Reception ==
=== Critical response ===
The film received critical acclaim at the Berlin Film Festival. Hidden Away has an approval rating of 67% on review aggregator website Rotten Tomatoes, based on 9 reviews, and an average rating of 5.7/10.

The Upcoming gave it five stars out of five.

=== Awards and nominations ===
- 70th Berlin International Film Festival (2020)
  - Silver Bear for Best Actor to Elio Germano
  - Nomination for Golden Bear
- 33rd European Film Awards (2020)
  - European Film Award for Best Cinematographer to Matteo Cocco
  - European Film Award for Best Costume Designer to Ursula Patzak
  - Nomination for European Film Award for Best Actor to Elio Germano
- David di Donatello (2021)
  - David di Donatello for Best Film
  - David di Donatello for Best Director to Giorgio Diritti
  - David di Donatello for Best Actor to Elio Germano
  - David di Donatello for Best Cinematography to Matteo Cocco
  - David di Donatello for Best Production Design to Ludovica Ferrario, Alessandra Mura and Paolo Zamagni
  - David di Donatello for Best Hairstyling to Aldo Signoretti
  - David di Donatello for Best Sound to Carlo Missidenti, Filippo Toso, Luca Leprotti, Marco Biscarini and Francesco Tumminello
  - Nomination for David di Donatello for Best Producer to Carla Degli Esposti
  - Nomination for David di Donatello for Best Original Screenplay to Giorgio Diritti, Tania Pedroni and Fredo Valla
  - Nomination for David di Donatello for Best Costumes to Ursula Patzak
  - Nomination for David di Donatello for Best Make-up to Giuseppe Desiato and Lorenzo Tamburini
  - Nomination for David di Donatello for Best Visual Effects to Rodolfo Migliari
  - Nomination for David di Donatello for Best Editing to Paolo Cottignola and Giorgio Diritti
  - Nomination for David di Donatello for Best Score to Marco Biscarini and Daniele Furlati
  - Nomination for David di Donatello for Best Original Song to Invisible by Marco Biscarini
