= Sonia Gessner =

Italian-Swiss actress (1938–2026)

- Born: 24 December 1938; Milan, Italy
- Died: 14 April 2026 (aged 87)
- Occupation: Actress

Sonia Gessner (24 December 1938 – 14 April 2026) was a Swiss-Italian actress. She was active in the Politeama Rossetti and appeared in films from 1961 to 2016.

Gessner died on 14 April 2026, at the age of 87.

== Filmography ==
- A Milanese Story (1962)
- 8½ (1963)
- Blow to the Heart (1982)
- Love and Fear (1988)
- The Sun Also Shines at Night (1990)
- A Soul Split in Two (1993)
- Let's Not Keep in Touch (1994)
- Not of this World (1999)
- The Life That I Want (2004)
- There Will Come a Day (2013)
- The Great Beauty (2013)
- Youth (2015)
