= Giorgio Diritti =

Italian director and screenwriter (born 1959)

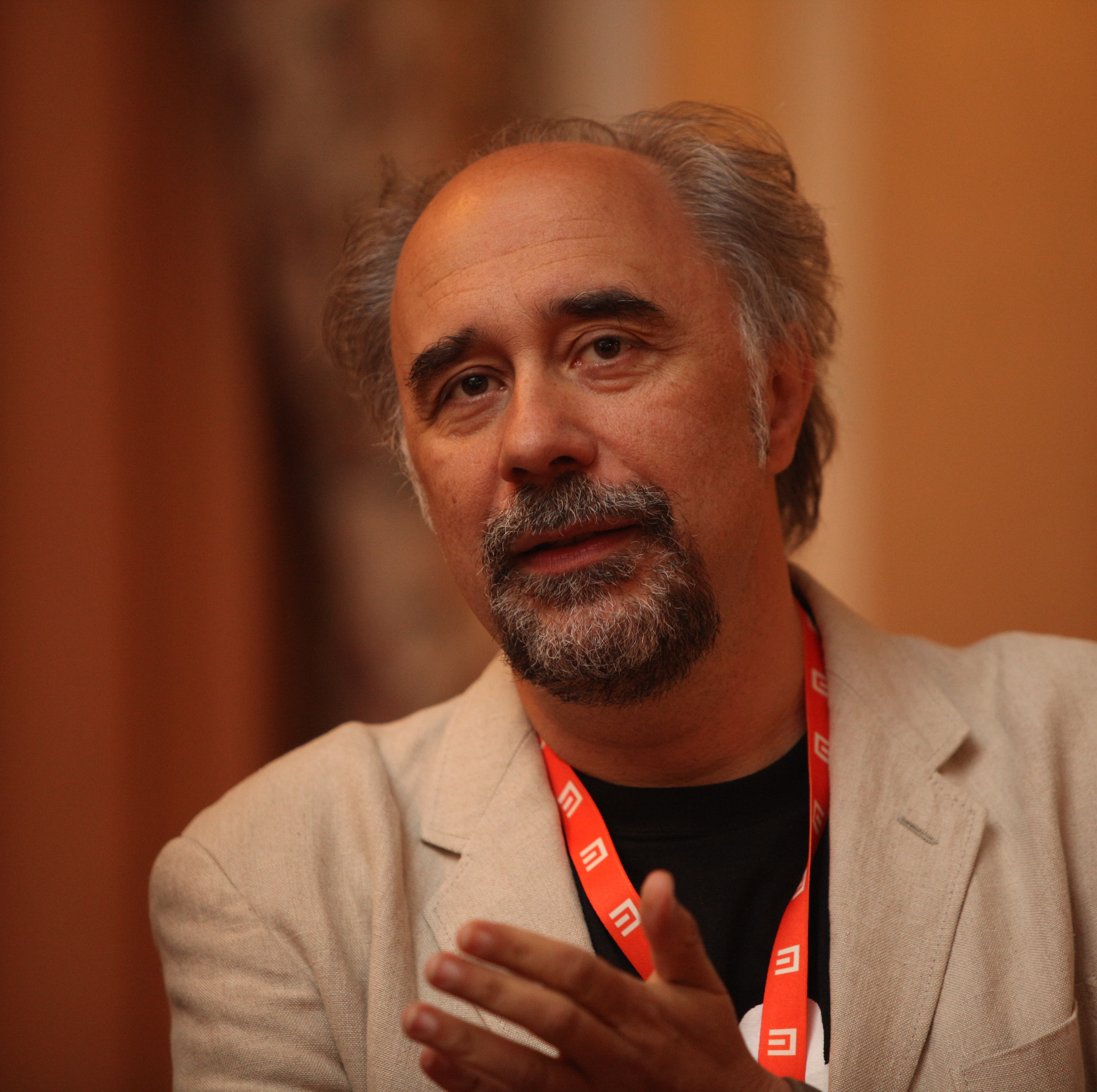
- Diritti at the 2010 Karlovy Vary Film Festival.
- Born: 21 December 1959 (age 66); Bologna, Italy
- Occupations: Director, Screenwriter, Film editor
- Years active: 1990–present

Giorgio Diritti (born 21 December 1959) is an Italian director and screenwriter.

== Career ==
Diritti trained by working alongside various authors such as Pupi Avati and made various castings for films in Emilia-Romagna, including Federico Fellini's The Voice of the Moon. He took part in the activity of Ipotesi Cinema, an institute for the training of young authors, founded and directed by Ermanno Olmi. During the years, Diritti directed documentaries, short films and television programs.

His debut film, The Wind Blows Round, participates in over 60 national and international festivals, winning over 36 awards and became a "national case", remaining in programming at Cinema Mexico in Milan for more than a year and a half.

His second film, The Man Who Will Come, is presented in the official selection of the 2009 Rome Film Festival, where it won the Silver Marc'Aurelio - Grand Jury Prize.

In 2013, his film There Will Come a Day premiered at the Sundance Film Festival.

In 2020, Diritti directed Hidden Away, which tells the life of painter Antonio Ligabue: the film was presented at the 2020 Berlin Film Festival, where Elio Germano won for his role the Silver Bear for Best Actor. The film later won six David di Donatello Awards, including Best Film and Best Director.

== Filmography ==
- The Wind Blows Round (2005)
- The Man Who Will Come (2009)
- There Will Come a Day (2013)
- Hidden Away (2020)
- Lubo (2023)

== Nominations and awards ==
- David di Donatello
  - 2008 - Nomination for David di Donatello for Best Film for The Wind Blows Round
  - 2008 - Nomination for David di Donatello for Best Director for The Wind Blows Round
  - 2008 - Nomination for David di Donatello for Best Original Screenplay for The Wind Blows Round
  - 2008 - Nomination for David di Donatello for Best Producer for The Wind Blows Round
  - 2008 - Nomination for David di Donatello for Best Editing for The Wind Blows Round
  - 2010 - David di Donatello for Best Film for The Man Who Will Come
  - 2010 - Nomination for David di Donatello for Best Director for The Man Who Will Come
  - 2010 - Nomination for David di Donatello for Best Original Screenplay for The Man Who Will Come
  - 2010 - David di Donatello for Best Producer for The Man Who Will Come
  - 2010 - Nomination for David di Donatello for Best Editing for The Man Who Will Come
  - 2021 - David di Donatello for Best Film for Hidden Away
  - 2021 - David di Donatello for Best Director for Hidden Away
  - 2021 - Nomination for David di Donatello for Best Original Screenplay for Hidden Away
  - 2021 - Nomination for David di Donatello for Best Editing for Hidden Away
- Nastro d'Argento
  - 2008 - Nomination for Nastro d'Argento for Best New Director for The Wind Blows Round
  - 2008 - Nomination for Nastro d'Argento for Best Editing for The Wind Blows Round
  - 2010 - Nomination for Nastro d'Argento for Best Director for The Man Who Will Come
  - 2010 - Nastro d'Argento for Best Producer for The Man Who Will Come
  - 2010 - Nomination for Nastro d'Argento for Best Editing for The Man Who Will Come
  - 2013 - Nomination for Nastro d'Argento for Best Producer for There Will Come a Day
