= Loose Cannons (2010 film) =

- Italian Poster
- Directed by: Ferzan Özpetek
- Written by: Ferzan Özpetek; Ivan Cotroneo
- Produced by: Domenico Procacci
- Starring: Riccardo Scamarcio; Nicole Grimaudo; Alessandro Preziosi; Ennio Fantastichini; Lunetta Savino; Ilaria Occhini; Carmine Recano; Paola Minaccioni; Bianca Nappi; Massimiliano Gallo; Gianluca De Marchi; Mauro Bonaffini; Daniele Pecci; Carolina Crescentini; Elena Sofia Ricci
- Cinematography: Maurizio Calvesi
- Edited by: Patrizio Marone
- Music by: Pasquale Catalano
- Production company: Fandango
- Distributed by: 01 Distribution
- Release dates: 13 February 2010 (Berlin); 12 March 2010 (Italy)
- Running time: 110 minutes
- Country: Italy
- Language: Italian
- Box office: €8.3 million

Loose Cannons (Italian: Mine vaganti) is a 2010 Italian comedy film directed by Ferzan Özpetek. Özpetek also wrote the script with the help of Ivan Cotroneo, while Domenico Procacci served as a producer. The film stars Riccardo Scamarcio, Alessandro Preziosi, Nicole Grimaudo, Lunetta Savino, Ennio Fantastichini, and Ilaria Occhini.

Loose Cannons premiered on 13 February 2010, at the 60th Berlin International Film Festival. The following month, it was theatrically released in Italy, Switzerland, and Turkey. In the United States, the film premiered at the Tribeca Film Festival on 28 April 2010, where it won the Special Jury Prize. It was later screened at the Seattle International Film Festival, the Provincetown International Film Festival and Palm Springs International Film Festival. In October 2010, the film was screened at the London Film Festival.

Loose Cannons received generally positive reviews from critics. It was nominated for thirteen David di Donatello Awards, including for the Best Film, winning the Best Supporting Actor for Ennio Fantastichini and the Best Supporting Actress for Ilaria Occhini. The film also earned six out of eleven nominations at the Nastro d'Argento Awards.

== Plot summary ==
Tommaso Cantone left his hometown in Salento, Southern Italy, because of its narrow-minded inhabitants, and for some time he has resided in Rome with his boyfriend Marco. In fact, in the big city, he was able to create his own independence and live in the light of the sun his homosexuality. After a long time, determined to reveal his sexual orientation to his family, he returns to his homeland, where he comes to confront his middle-class parents, and a mentally different society. The Cantone are a large and bizarre family, known in Lecce for being the owner of a large industrial pasta factory. Tommaso will have to face his severe and hard father Vincenzo, his suffocating mother Stefania, his elder brother Antonio, whom his father would like to be joined by Tommaso in the management of the pasta factory, and his sister Elena, who aspires to a better life than that of a housewife. His eccentric aunt Luciana and his grandmother are also part of the numerous clan of the Cantone.

Once back in Lecce, Tommaso comes out to his brother Antonio, who is not particularly disturbed by the revelation; however, on the evening in which Tommaso would like to reveal himself to his entire family, Antonio is the first to speak and to come out as gay himself: feeling the responsibility to carry on the family name, the man had always hidden himself, but in seeing the coming out of his brother his final sentence he had decided to do it first. In fact, the consequences of that gesture are tragic: Vincenzo kicks Antonio out of the house shortly before having a heart attack; the whole family feels targeted by the slander and gossip of the town, while Tommaso has the whole responsibility of the pasta factory. Tommaso also lied about his university career: he has in fact declared that he had enrolled in economics and commerce, while in reality he's close to a degree in literature and his dream is to become a writer. In this, however, he finds an unexpected ally in Alba Brunetti, daughter of Vincenzo's work partner and brilliant economist, with whom Tommaso establishes an ambiguous friendship.

While the family tries to adapt to the sudden change, Tommaso feels more and more inadequate in his new responsibilities, which also leads him to neglect his boyfriend Marco and not to be able to return to Rome as he would have liked. After a very tense confrontation with his brother, in which each of the two accuses the other of each other faults, the daily life of the Cantone is upset by the arrival of Marco together with his friends Davide, Andrea and Massimiliano: believing them to be heterosexual, Tommaso's parents welcome them in his own house, against Tommaso's wishes. Soon the extravagance of the three friends makes the family suspicious, confirming some clues about him being gay. Meanwhile, Marco accuses his boyfriend of not being able to deal with his parents, and their relationship becomes very tense. Only shortly before departure the two manage to clarify the things between them; once Marco and his friends are gone, Tommaso finally finds the courage to face his parents and declare that the life they have chosen for him is not the one he wants to live.

That same evening, the grandmother puts in place an extreme plan to resolve the situation: despite suffering from diabetes mellitus, she decides to eat a huge amount of sweets that leads her to her death. Since she is the largest shareholder of the pasta factory, she in her last will leaves it to Antonio, who will thus have to return to the family, and she recommends each member of the family to be himself and to respect the diversity of others. During her funeral, past and present come together in an almost dreamlike scene: the grandmother finds her beloved Nicola, her husband's brother and her only true love; Vincenzo and Antonio seem to make peace, while Tommaso watches Marco and Alba dance and, after hinting at a smile, leaves.

== Cast ==
- Riccardo Scamarcio as Tommaso Cantone
- Alessandro Preziosi as Antonio Cantone
- Lunetta Savino as Stefania Cantone
- Ennio Fantastichini as Vincenzo Cantone
- Nicole Grimaudo as Alba Brunetti
- Ilaria Occhini as Grandmother
- Elena Sofia Ricci as Aunt Luciana
- Bianca Nappi as Elena Cantone
- Massimiliano Gallo as Salvatore
- Daniele Pecci as Andrea
- Carolina Crescentini as Young Grandmother
- Carmine Recano as Marco
- Paola Minaccioni as Teresa
- Gianluca De Marchi as Davide
- Mauro Bonaffini as Massimiliano
- Gea Martire as Patrizia
- Matteo Taranto as Domenico
- Giorgio Marchesi as Nicola

== Release ==
Loose Cannons premiered on 13 February 2010 at the 60th Berlin International Film Festival. The following month, it was theatrically released in Italy, Switzerland and Turkey. On 28 April, the film was screened at the Tribeca Film Festival, earning the Special Jury Prize. A month later, Loose Cannons was shown at the Seattle International Film Festival. In the United States, it would also be screened at the Provincetown International Film Festival and Palm Springs International Film Festival in January 2011.

Throughout 2010 and 2011, Loose Cannons was screened at film festivals such as Aruba International Film Festival, Moscow Film Festival, Durban International Film Festival, Festival do Rio and Ghent International Film Festival, and was theatrically released in France, Russia, Sweden, Germany, Poland, Austria, Portugal, Spain, Brazil, Hungary, Japan, Colombia, the Netherlands, Argentina and Philippines. In October 2010, the film was shown at the London Film Festival before being released in British cinemas.

In 2021, Warner Brothers and Sincrone Produções produced a Brazilian remake entitled Quem Vai Ficar com Mário? (There's something about Mario).

== Reception ==
=== Critical response ===
Review aggregation website Rotten Tomatoes gives the film an approval rating of 72% based on 18 reviews and an average score of 5.9/10.

=== Awards and nominations ===
Awards	Category	Nominee	Result
63rd Silver Ribbon Awards	Best Director	Ferzan Özpetek	Nominated
63rd Silver Ribbon Awards	Best Comedy	Ferzan Özpetek	Won
63rd Silver Ribbon Awards	Best Producer	Domenico Procacci	Nominated
63rd Silver Ribbon Awards	Best Screenplay	Ferzan Özpetek and Ivan Cotroneo	Nominated
63rd Silver Ribbon Awards	Best Actor	Riccardo Scamarcio	Nominated
63rd Silver Ribbon Awards	Best Supporting Actor	Ennio Fantastichini	Won
63rd Silver Ribbon Awards	Best Supporting Actress	Elena Sofia Ricci and Lunetta Savino	Won
63rd Silver Ribbon Awards	Best Cinematography	Maurizio Calvesi	Won
63rd Silver Ribbon Awards	Best Scenography	Andrea Crisanti	Nominated
63rd Silver Ribbon Awards	Best Score	Pasquale Catalano	Nominated
63rd Silver Ribbon Awards	Best Original Song	Patty Pravo	Won
59th David di Donatello Awards	Best Film	Ferzan Özpetek	Nominated
59th David di Donatello Awards	Best Director	Ferzan Özpetek	Nominated
59th David di Donatello Awards	Best Script	Ferzan Özpetek, Ivan Cotroneo	Nominated
59th David di Donatello Awards	Best Producer	Domenico Procacci	Nominated
59th David di Donatello Awards	Best Supporting Actor	Ennio Fantastichini	Won
59th David di Donatello Awards	Best Supporting Actress	Ilaria Occhini	Won
59th David di Donatello Awards	Best Supporting Actress	Elena Sofia Ricci	Nominated
59th David di Donatello Awards	Best Cinematography	Maurizio Calvesi	Nominated
59th David di Donatello Awards	Best Score	Pasquale Catalano	Nominated
59th David di Donatello Awards	Best Original Song	Marco Giacomelli, Patty Pravo, Fabio Petrillo, Ilaria Cortese	Nominated
59th David di Donatello Awards	Best Production Design	Andrea Crisanti	Nominated
59th David di Donatello Awards	Best Costumes	Alessandro Lai	Nominated
59th David di Donatello Awards	Best Film Editing	Patrizio Marone	Nominated
50th Italian Golden Globe	Best Film	Paolo Sorrentino	Won
50th Italian Golden Globe	Best Screenplay	Ferzan Özpetek and Ivan Cotroneo	Won
50th Italian Golden Globe	Best Cinematography	Maurizio Calvesi	Won
50th Italian Golden Globe	Best Actress Revelation	Nicole Grimaudo	Won
25th Ciak d'oro	Best Film	Ferzan Özpetek	Won
25th Ciak d'oro	Best Actor	Riccardo Scamarcio	Won
25th Ciak d'oro	Best Supporting Actor	Ennio Fantastichini	Won
25th Ciak d'oro	Best Supporting Actress	Elena Sofia Ricci	Won
25th Ciak d'oro	Best Screenwriter	Ferzan Özpetek and Ivan Cotroneo	Nominated
25th Ciak d'oro	Best Producer	Domenico Procacci	Nominated
25th Ciak d'oro	Best Sets and Decorations	Andrea Crisanti	Nominated
25th Ciak d'oro	Best Movie Poster		Nominated
23rd European Film Awards	Audience Award for Best Film	Loose Cannons	Nominated
23rd European Film Awards	Audience Award for Best Score	Pasquale Catalano	Nominated
Tribeca Film Festival Awards	Special Jury Prize	Loose Cannons	Won

== Other media ==
=== Soundtrack album ===
Loose Cannons

Soundtrack album by Various Artists
- Released: 12 March 2010
- Recorded: 2009–10
- Genre: Soundtrack, pop
- Length: 66:18
- Label: Universal Music
- Producer: Pasquale Catalano

The soundtrack album for Loose Cannons was released on 12 March 2010 through Universal Music. It was produced by Pasquale Catalano, who also composed the original music for the film. The vocals were recorded by Eleonora Bordonaro, while the music was recorded by Fabrizio Romano (piano), Paolo Sasso (violin), Pietro Bentivenga (accordion), Claudio Romano (guitar), Domenico Rinaldi (oboe) and Pasquale Catalano (guitar, mandolin and harpsichord).

==== Track listing ====
1. "Sogno" by Patty Pravo
2. "La linea dei ricordi" by Pasquale Catalano
3. "Tutti lo sanno" by Pasquale Catalano
4. "50mila" by Nina Zilli
5. "Nessuno ad aspettare" by Pasquale Catalano
6. "Duetto" by Pasquale Catalano
7. "Una notte a Napoli" by Pink Martini
8. "Sulina Waltz" by Pasquale Catalano
9. "Sorry, I'm a Lady" by Baccara
10. "Cuore di sabbia" by Pasquale Catalano
11. "Mine vaganti" by Pasquale Catalano
12. "Kutlama" by Sezen Aksu
13. "Due notti" by Pasquale Catalano
14. "Yara" by Radiodervish
15. "La ruota pazza" by Pasquale Catalano
16. "Pensiero stupendo" by Patty Pravo
17. "Mais De Min" by Mariana Delgado
18. "Kutlama (Reprise)" by Radiodervish

=== Home media ===
Loose Cannons was released on DVD on 25 June 2010, and on Blu-ray on 27 August.
