= Antonio Ligabue =

Italian painter (1899–1965)

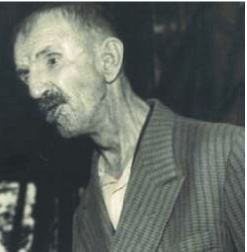
Antonio Ligabue

Antonio Ligabue (18 December 1899 – 27 May 1965; born Antonio Laccabue) was an Italian painter. He was one of the most important Naïve artists of the 20th century.

== Biography ==
He was born in Zürich, Switzerland on 18 December 1899, to Elisabetta Costa, a native from Cencenighe Agordino, and supposedly to Bonfiglio Laccabue (the true identity of the father is still unknown), native from Reggio Emilia. His mother, Elisabetta, and three brothers died in 1913 as a result of food poisoning.

In 1942 the painter changed his surname from Laccabue to Ligabue, presumably because of the hate towards his father, whom he considered guilty of the uxoricide of his mother. In September 1900 he was entrusted to the Swiss Johannes Valentin Göbel and Elise Hanselmann. He began to work occasionally as a farm hand and conducted a wandering life. After an altercation with his foster mother, he was hospitalized in a psychiatric clinic.

In 1919, following the complaint by Hanselmann, Ligabue was expelled from Switzerland. From Chiasso he was moved to Gualtieri, in the province of Reggio Emilia, the hamlet of origin of the adoptive father but, not knowing a word of Italian, he tried to return to Switzerland.

Ligabue lived with support from the City Hospice of beggars. He began to paint in 1920. In 1928 he met Marino Mazzacurati, who appreciated his artistic capabilities and taught him the use of oil painting. In those years Ligabue devoted himself to painting and continued to wander aimlessly along the River Po.

In 1937 he was hospitalized in a mental hospital in Reggio Emilia for self-mutilation. In 1941 Andrea Mozzali helped him to get out of the psychiatric hospital and welcomed him to his home in Guastalla, near Reggio Emilia. During World War II Ligabue served in the Italian Army as an interpreter for the German troops. In 1945, after beating a German soldier with a bottle, he was interned in a mental hospital and remained there for three years.

In 1948 he began painting more intensely, and journalists, critics and art dealers began to be interested in him. In 1957 Severo Boschi, a journalist at the Il Resto del Carlino newspaper, and photographer Aldo Ferrari went to Gualtieri to meet him. The result was the currently best-known photograph of Ligabue.

In 1961 his first solo exhibition was held at the La Barcaccia gallery in Rome. He had a motorcycle accident and the following year he was stricken with paralysis. Guastalla dedicated him a major retrospective in 1963. By now ill, asked to be received in the Catholic Church and, shortly after being baptized and confirmed, Ligabue died in Gualtieri on 27 May 1965.

In 1965, after his death, a retrospective of his work was held in the context of the Ninth Quadrennial of Rome.

== See also ==
- Ligabue (1978 film)
- Hidden Away (2020 film)
