= The Man Who Will Come =

The Man Who Will Come L'uomo che verrà
- Directed by: Giorgio Diritti
- Screenplay by: Giorgio Diritti; Giovanni Galavotti; Tania Pedroni
- Produced by: Simone Bachini; Giorgio Diritti
- Starring: Claudio Casadio; Alba Rohrwacher; Maya Sansa; Greta Zuccheri Montanari
- Cinematography: Roberto Cimatti
- Edited by: Giorgio Diritti; Paolo Marzoni
- Music by: Marco Biscarini; Daniele Furlati
- Production companies: Aranciafilm; Rai Cinema
- Distributed by: Mikado Film
- Release dates: October 16, 2009 (Rome Film Festival); January 22, 2010 (Italy)
- Running time: 115 minutes
- Country: Italy
- Languages: Italian; German; Emilian

The Man Who Will Come (Italian: L'uomo che verrà) is a 2009 Italian historical drama film directed by Giorgio Diritti. It was released in Italian cinemas on January 22, 2010. In the original version the film is in Bolognese dialect with subtitles in Italian.

The film was presented in competition at the International Rome Film Festival 2009, where it won the audience's Marc'Aurelio d'Oro for best film and the Grand Jury Prize Marc'Aurelio d'Argento. It garnered sixteen nominations for David di Donatello 2010, winning three awards, including one for best film. It received seven nominations for Nastri d'Argento 2010, winning three.

== Plot ==
The film is set in the winter between 1943 and 1944 in the Apennines. Eight-year-old Martina lives with her parents and a large peasant family, who toil every day to survive. Since the death of her younger brother, Martina has stopped talking, and this makes her the object of her peers' ridicule, however her observations are profound. World War II arrives, with the increasingly intrusive presence of German soldiers and squads of partisans. Martina's mother Lena becomes pregnant and Martina carefully follows the nine months of gestation, while the war intersects with everyday life: laundry, woven baskets in the stable, slaughter of the pig, flirtations of young people, first communion.

Martina's little brother is born at home at the end of September 1944. At daybreak the SS, supported by units of German soldiers, arrive in the hills. They carry out a ferocious roundup, to be remembered as the "Marzabotto massacre": old people, women and children are murdered after they are herded into cemeteries, churches and farmhouses. Martina, who had managed to escape, is discovered and locked up in the small church of Cerpiano together with dozens of others. After closing the doors, the soldiers carry out a massacre.

Martina miraculously remains unharmed and returns home, finding only empty rooms and silence: she takes the basket with her brother, whom she had hidden inside a refuge in the woods, and takes shelter in the rectory of Don Fornasini. After the massacre is complete, she returns to the family cottage, where she cares for her brother by singing a lullaby, regaining her speech.

== Production ==
The film was shot in Radicondoli, in the province of Siena, and in Monte San Pietro, in the province of Bologna, with a budget of 3 million euros and with the support of Rai Cinema and the Ministry for Cultural Heritage and Activities.

== Reality and fiction ==
The director studied extensively before making the film, especially at the Parri Institute (Institute for the history and memories of the 20th century, Bologna). Peasant life is presented with realism and richness of detail. The credits state that the characters and the events of the film are fictional, while the historical background (the massacre of Monte Sole/Marzabotto) is real. Some characters featured in the film existed:

- don Giovanni Fornasini, a young anti-fascist priest;
- don Ubaldo Marchioni, who was killed in front of the altar of the church of Casaglia: the pyx he was holding in his hand at the time of the killing is still preserved, and it still has the bullet stuck on its side;
- Sister Antonietta Benni, Ursuline, kindergarten teacher (in the film however, her name is not mentioned); in reality, she is one of the three survivors of the Cerpiano massacre;
- the partisan "Lupo", of the brigade Stella Rossa;
- the crippled woman killed in the church because she could not obey the German soldiers who had ordered her to leave the holy place immediately;
- a group of eighty-four people killed in the Casaglia cemetery;
- a group of about seventy people killed inside the church of Cerpiano.

== Awards ==
- David di Donatello 2010
  - Best Film
  - Best Producer
  - Best Sound
