= Blow to the Heart =

1982 Italian film by Gianni Amelio

- Directed by: Gianni Amelio
- Written by: Vincenzo Cerami
- Story by: Gianni Amelio
- Starring: Jean-Louis Trintignant; Laura Morante
- Cinematography: Tonino Nardi
- Music by: Franco Piersanti
- Release date: 1982
- Country: Italy
- Language: Italian

Blow to the Heart (Italian: Colpire al cuore) is a 1982 Italian drama film directed by Gianni Amelio. The film entered the competition at the 39th Venice Film Festival. Fausto Rossi won a Silver Ribbon and a David di Donatello as best new actor. The film also won the Silver Ribbon for best script. It was described as a "masterful psychological study investigating two profoundly different characters". A teenage son of a university professor discovers his father's secret life and begins keeping his father under surveillance after one of his father's friends dies in a terrorist shoot-out.

== Cast ==
- Jean-Louis Trintignant as Dario
- Fausto Rossi as Emilio
- Laura Morante as Giulia
- Sonia Gessner as Emilio's mother
- Vanni Corbellini as Sandro Ferrari
- Laura Nucci as Dario's mother
- Matteo Cerami as Matteo

== See also ==
- List of Italian films of 1982
