= The Right Distance =

- Italian: La giusta distanza
- Directed by: Carlo Mazzacurati
- Starring: Valentina Lodovini
- Cinematography: Luca Bigazzi
- Music by: Tin Hat
- Production company: Fandango
- Release date: 2007
- Country: Italy
- Language: Italian

The Right Distance (Italian: La giusta distanza) is a 2007 Italian drama film directed by Carlo Mazzacurati.

It entered the competition at the second Rome Film Festival. The film was later awarded with a Nastro d'Argento for best script; it was also nominated for several David di Donatello Awards, including categories for Best Film and Best Actress.

== Cast ==
- Giovanni Capovilla as Giovanni
- Valentina Lodovini as Mara
- Ahmed Hafiene as Hassan
- Giuseppe Battiston as Amos
- Fabrizio Bentivoglio as Bencivegna
- Marina Rocco as Eva
- Natalino Balasso as Franco
- Dario Cantarelli as Tiresia
- Ivano Marescotti as lawyer

== See also ==
- Movies about immigration to Italy
