= Let's Not Keep in Touch =

- Theatrical release poster
- Italian: Perdiamoci di vista
- Directed by: Carlo Verdone
- Written by: Carlo Verdone; Francesca Marciano
- Produced by: Mario Cecchi Gori; Vittorio Cecchi Gori
- Starring: Carlo Verdone; Asia Argento
- Cinematography: Danilo Desideri
- Edited by: Antonio Siciliano
- Music by: Fabio Liberatori
- Production company: Cecchi Gori Group Tiger Cinematografica
- Distributed by: Penta Distribuzione
- Release date: 27 January 1994 (Italy)
- Running time: 110 minutes
- Country: Italy
- Language: Italian
- Box office: $4.2 million (Italy)

Let's Not Keep in Touch (Italian: Perdiamoci di vista) is a 1994 Italian romantic comedy film written, directed by and starring Carlo Verdone.

For this film Asia Argento was awarded with a David di Donatello for Best Actress.

== Plot ==
Gepy 'Fuxas' is the famous host of a television talk show for RAI in Rome. He has built his fame on the populist pursue of highly emotional scoops, trivializing the real problems of his public and faking over-the-top drama in order to increase his audience. One day a paraplegic girl, Arianna, exposes during the show Gepy's hypocrisy and his instrumental abuses of his guests' private life. The scandal leads to the show being canceled and Gepy being fired by the national broadcasting company. He tries in vain to recover his public image, and to find a second wind for his career, eventually accepting a job offer from a much smaller private network. The vulgarity of the program leads however him to abandon the show already during recordings of the pilot.

While Gepy's professional efforts aren't successful, on the personal side he starts to date Arianna and to gradually develop a more mature conscience. Their relationship however remains full of struggles, since Arianna remains very jealous of her independence, and Gepy seems unable to really accept her handicap as a permanent condition, aside which the girl however leads a very normal life. After reading by chance about a miraculous new therapy, he tricks Arianna to join him for a short vacation in Prague, and only on-site he reveals the real goal of their trip. After this unsuccessful attempt, the two appear to reconcile with their conditions and each others.

== Cast ==
- Carlo Verdone as Gepy Fuxas
- Asia Argento as Arianna
- Aldo Maccione as Antonazzi
- Sonia Gessner as Magda
- Cosima Costantini as Ambra
- Anita Bartolucci as Elda

== Reception ==
It was one of the top 10 highest-grossing Italian films for the year with a gross of $4.2 million.

== See also ==
- List of Italian films of 1994
