= Accademia del Cinema Italiano =

Italian film organization

- Formation: 1963
- Type: Film organization
- Headquarters: Rome, Italy
- Members: 1776 (as of 2025)
- President: Piera Detassis
- Website: www.daviddidonatello.it

The Accademia del Cinema Italiano (English: Academy of Italian Cinema) is an organization that gives out the David di Donatello Awards. It was founded in 1955 as a part of the Open Gate Club, originally with the name Ente David di Donatello. The organization became independent in 1963. In 2007 it assumed its current name.

== Presidents ==
- Italo Gemini (1963-1970)
- Eitel Monaco (1971-1977)
- Paolo Grassi (1978-1980)
- Gian Luigi Rondi (1981-2016)
- Giuliano Montaldo (2016-2017) (ad interim)
- Piera Detassis (since 2018)
