= Fandango (Italian company) =

Italian entertainment company

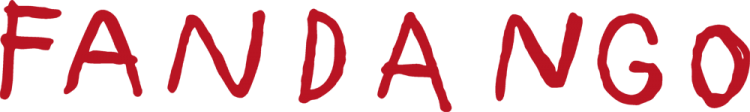
- Type: S.p.A.
- Industry: Entertainment
- Founded: 1989; 37 years ago
- Founder: Domenico Procacci
- Headquarters: Rome, Italy
- Services: Film distribution; Film production; Publishing; Television production
- Website: www.fandango.it

Fandango is an Italian entertainment company founded in 1989 by Domenico Procacci. Fandango began as a film production company and has expanded its focus over the years into publishing, film distribution, music, television, radio, and the management of literary cafés and cinemas.

== History ==
Fandango was founded in 1989 by Domenico Procacci, who named it after the 1985 film of the same name starring Kevin Costner. Fandango's first production was the film The Station (1990) by Sergio Rubini. The film was screened at the Venice International Film Festival, and was awarded the David di Donatello Award for Best New Director and the Nastro d'Argento for Best New Director. In 1992, Fandango produced its first international co-production, Bad Boy Bubby by Rolf de Heer. The collaboration later inspired the creation of an Australian branch of Fandango in 2002. In 1998, Fandango produced two films by first-time directors: Radiofreccia by Luciano Ligabue and Ecco fatto by Gabriele Muccino.

In 2000, Fandango Distribuzione was created. Its first film was Johnny the Partisan (2000) by Guido Chiesa, which Fandango also produced. In 2001, the Radio Fandango record label was founded. It was initially started to publish soundtracks of the films produced. Since 2005, however, it has been a full-fledged record label. Towards the end of 2002, the Laboratorio Fandango was created. In practice, it is a film school divided into a directing course and a production course. It is free and open to a maximum of 12 students.

Fandango owned the historic Politecnico cineclub, which Procacci acquired in 2001. It was located in the Flaminio quartiere of Rome. In 2006, Procacci opened the Caffè Fandango, a bookshop meeting place and center for promotion.

The animated logo shown at the beginning of the films produced and distributed by Fandango was created by Gianluigi Toccafondo.

=== Publishing ===
In 1998, Fandango created the publishing house Fandango Libri, which publishes comics, fiction, nonfiction, poetry and plays. In 2005, Fandango Libri was revamped with a new corporate structure. Fandango Libri publishes both well-known authors, such as Andrea Pazienza, and emerging writers such as Maurizio de Giovanni.

In 2009, Fandango acquired the comics publisher Coconino Press, founded by Igort. Coconino Press is known for its translations of comics from around the world.

In February 2011, Fandango acquired the publisher Alet and, through it, also the publisher Beccogiallo. Alet, which is based in Padua, reprints classic texts.

In May 2011, Fandango acquired the publishing house Playground, founded by Andrea Bergamini, who was its editorial director and would remain at the helm of the publishing house in partnership with Domenico Procacci. Playground focuses exclusively on fiction, including the popular collana editoriale High School, as well as children's fiction.

In April 2012, Fandango's publishing company was renamed to Gruppo Fandango Editore. Its director is Edoardo Nesi, winner of the 2011 Strega Prize former member of Fandango Libri since 2005. At the same time, Fandango acquired Orecchio Acerbo, a graphic arts studio and publisher of books and comics, founded in Rome in December 2001 by Fausta Orecchio and Simone Tonucci.

== Filmography ==
=== Feature films ===
- The Station (1990)
- Flight of the Innocent (1992)
- Bad Boy Bubby (1993)
- The Blonde (1993)
- Life and Extraordinary Adventures of Private Ivan Chonkin (1994)
- Like Two Crocodiles (1994)
- Bits and Pieces (1996)
- The Quiet Room (1996)
- The Grey Zone (1997)
- Epsilon (1997)
- The Ice Rink (1998)
- Ecco fatto (1998)
- Radiofreccia (1998)
- The Room of the Scirocco (1998)
- But Forever in My Mind (1999)
- The Monkey's Mask (2000)
- Johnny the Partisan (2000)
- Samsara (2001)
- He Died with a Felafel in His Hand (2001)
- Dust (2001)
- Dark Blue World (2001)
- The Last Kiss (2001)
- Maximum Velocity (V-Max) (2002)
- The Embalmer (2002)
- Respiro (2002)
- Break Free (2003)
- Secret File (2003)
- Now or Never (2003)
- Remember Me, My Love (2003)
- Strawberries in the Supermarket (2003)
- Eros (2004)
- Working Slowly (Radio Alice) (2004)
- The Consequences of Love (2004)
- First Love (2004)
- Texas (2005)
- Mario's War (2005)
- Tickets (2005)
- The Family Friend (2006)
- Ten Canoes (2006)
- Our Land (2006)
- Don't Waste Your Time, Johnny! (2007)
- The Right Distance (2007)
- Silk (2007)
- Sympathy for the Lobster (2007)
- The Past Is a Foreign Land (2008)
- A Perfect Day (2008)
- Lecture 21 (2008)
- Gomorrah (2008)
- Quiet Chaos (2008)
- The White Space (2009)
- Cosmonaut (2009)
- La Passione (2010)
- Loose Cannons (2010)
- The Horde (2010)
- Kiss Me Again (2010)
- Drifters (2011)
- We Have a Pope (2011)
- The Perfect Life (2011)
- Qualunquemente (2011)
- The Last Man on Earth (2011)
- Magnificent Presence (2012)
- Diaz – Don't Clean Up This Blood (2012)
- Reality (2012)
- The Fifth Wheel (2013)
- I Can Quit Whenever I Want (2014)
- A Woman as a Friend (2014)
- Italian Race (2016)
- Era d'estate (2016)
- Sun, Heart, Love (2016)
- I Can Quit Whenever I Want: Masterclass (2017)
- La profezia dell'armadillo (2018)
- Bangla (2019)
- The Predators (2020)
- Three Floors (2021)
- Margins (2022)
- The Hummingbird (2022)
- Flowing (2022)
- A Brighter Tomorrow (2023)
- An Endless Sunday (2023)
- Anywhere Anytime (2024)
- The Holy Boy (2025)
- Damned If You Do, Damned If You Don't (2025)

=== Television ===
Year	Title	Network
2014–2021	Gomorrah	Sky Atlantic
2018–2024	My Brilliant Friend	HBO / Rai 1 / TIMvision
2020	Luna Nera	Netflix
2021	Luna Park	Netflix
2022	Bangla - La serie	RaiPlay
2023	The Lying Life of Adults	Netflix

=== Documentaries ===
- Super 8 Stories (2001)
