= 65th David di Donatello =

2020 Italian film awards

- Date: 8 May 2020
- Site: RAI Studios; Rome, Italy
- Hosted by: Carlo Conti

Highlights
- Best Picture: The Traitor
- Most awards: The Traitor (6)
- Most nominations: The Traitor (18)

Television coverage
- Network: Rai 1
- Duration: 2 hours, 8 minutes

The 65th David di Donatello ceremony, presented by the Accademia del Cinema Italiano, honoured the best Italian films of 2019. The ceremony was hosted by presenter Carlo Conti on 8 May 2020. The awards ceremony was initially set for 3 April 2020 but was postponed due to the COVID-19 pandemic. Also, the ceremony was held live at RAI Studios and broadcast by Rai 1 while the candidates were connected via video and answered the questions asked by the Carlo Conti from the studio.

The crime drama film The Traitor won six awards, including Best Film, out of eighteen nominations. Other winners included Pinocchio with five, The First King: Birth of an Empire with three, The Goddess of Fortune with two, and 5 is the Perfect Number, Bangla, Il flauto magico di Piazza Vittorio, Martin Eden, My Brother Chases Dinosaurs, Once Upon a Time... in Bethlehem, Parasite, Selfie and Timo's Winter with one.

== Winners and nominees ==
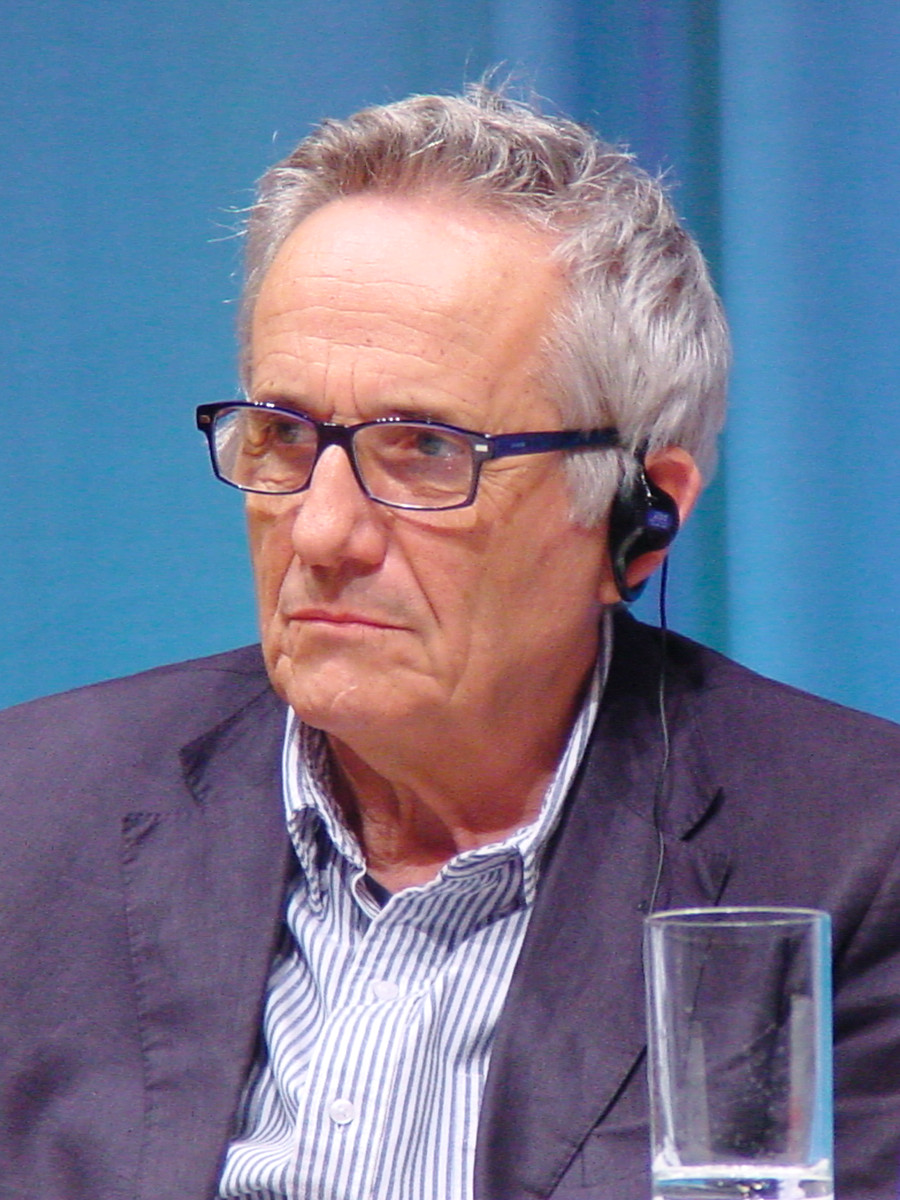
Marco Bellocchio, Best Film and Best Director winner

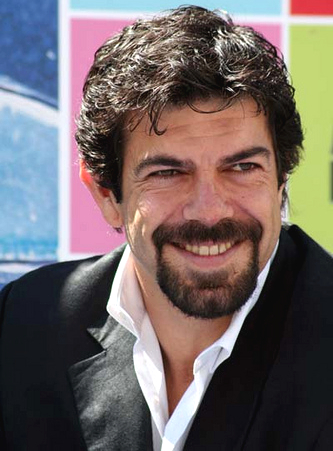
Pierfrancesco Favino, Best Actor winner

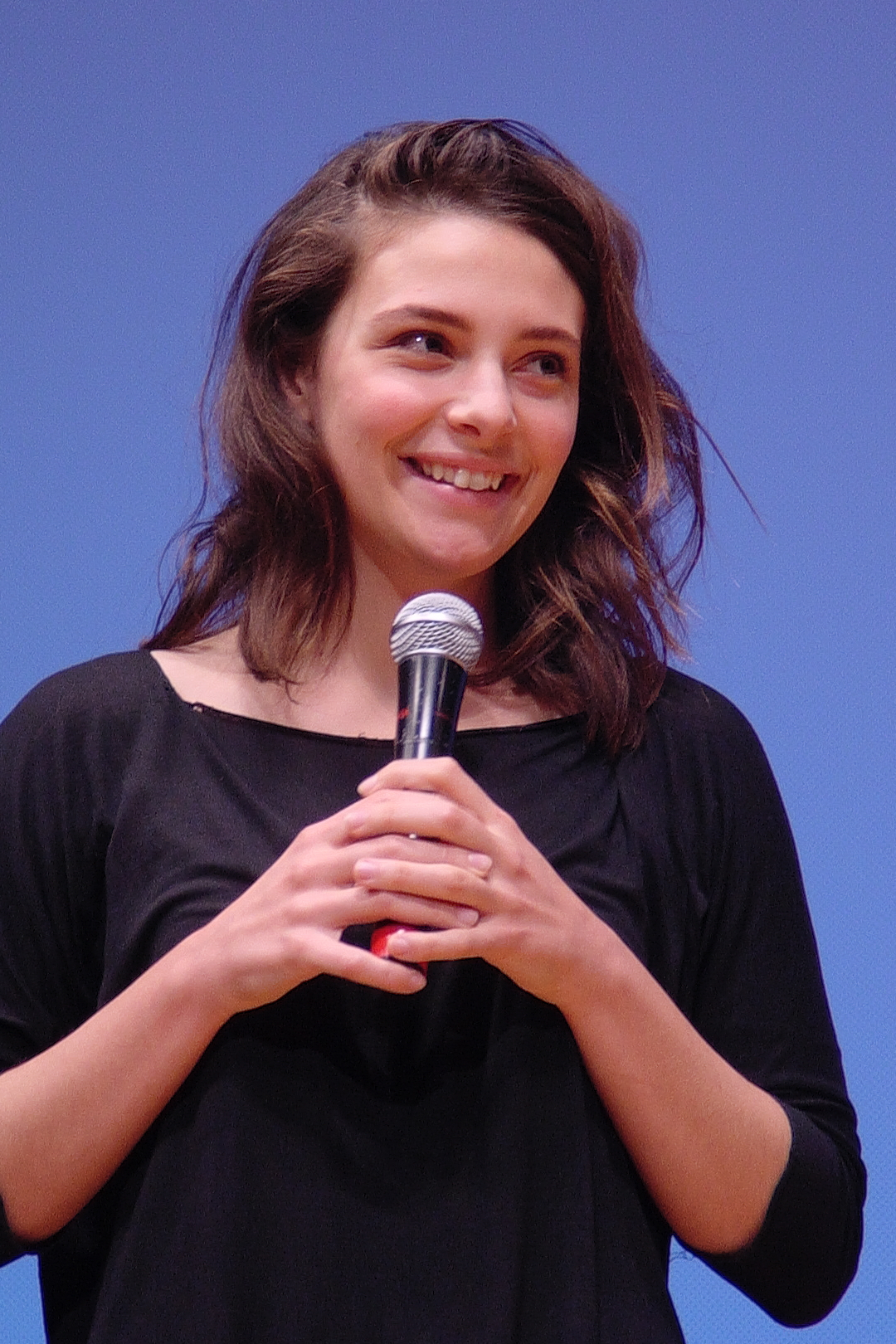
Jasmine Trinca, Best Actress winner

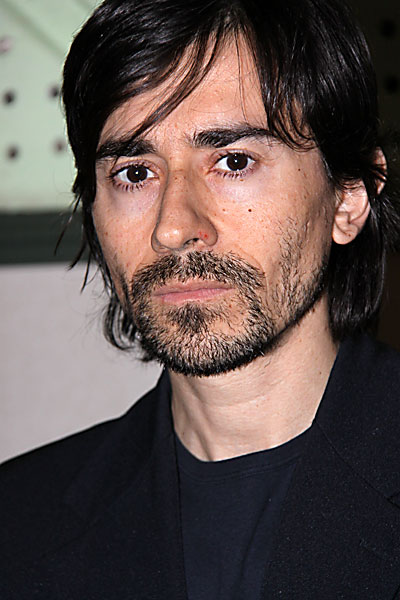
Luigi Lo Cascio, Best Supporting Actor winner

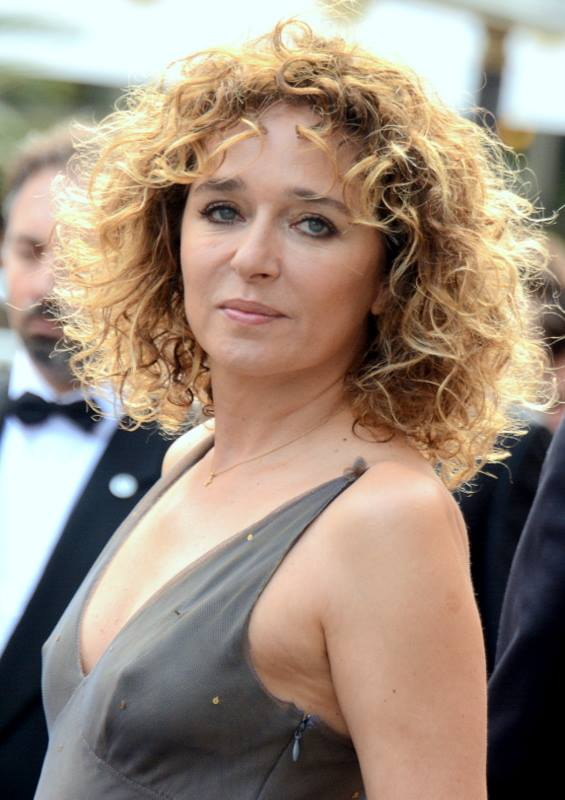
Valeria Golino, Best Supporting Actress winner

Winners are listed first, highlighted in boldface, and indicated with a double dagger (‡). The nominations were announced on 18 February 2020.

**Best Film**: **The Traitor – Marco Bellocchio, director**‡; The First King: Birth of an Empire – Matteo Rovere, director; Martin Eden – Pietro Marcello, director; Pinocchio – Matteo Garrone, director; Piranhas – Claudio Giovannesi, director	**Best Producer**: **The First King: Birth of an Empire – Andrea Paris and Matteo Rovere, producers; Groenlandia, Rai Cinema, Roman Citizen and Gapbusters, production companies**‡; Bangla – Domenico Procacci and Anna Maria Morelli, producers; TIMvision, production company; Martin Eden – Pietro Marcello, Beppe Caschetto, Thomas Ordonneau, Michael Weber and Viola Fügen, producers; Rai Cinema, production company; Pinocchio – Matteo Garrone, Jean Labadie, Anne-Laure Labadie, Jeremy Thomas and Paolo Del Brocco, producers; Archimede, Rai Cinema and Le Pacte, production companies; The Traitor – Beppe Caschetto, producer; IBC Movie, Kavac Film and Rai Cinema, production companies
**Best Director**: **Marco Bellocchio – The Traitor**‡; Claudio Giovannesi – Piranhas; Matteo Garrone – Pinocchio; Matteo Rovere – The First King: Birth of an Empire; Pietro Marcello – Martin Eden	**Best New Director**: **Phaim Bhuyian – Bangla**‡; Carlo Sironi – Sole; Igort – 5 Is the Perfect Number; Leonardo D'Agostini – The Champion; Marco D'Amore – The Immortal
**Best Actor**: **Pierfrancesco Favino – The Traitor as Tommaso Buscetta**‡; Alessandro Borghi – The First King: Birth of an Empire as Remus; Francesco Di Leva – The Mayor of Rione Sanità as Antonio Barracano; Luca Marinelli – Martin Eden as Martin Eden; Toni Servillo – 5 Is the Perfect Number as Peppino Lo Cicero	**Best Actress**: **Jasmine Trinca – The Goddess of Fortune as Annamaria**‡; Isabella Ragonese – My Brother Chases Dinosaurs as Katia; Linda Caridi – Remember? as Lei; Lunetta Savino – Rosa as Rosa; Valeria Bruni Tedeschi – The Summer House as Anna; Valeria Golino – Volare as Elisa
**Best Supporting Actor**: **Luigi Lo Cascio – The Traitor as Salvatore Contorno**‡; Carlo Buccirosso – 5 Is the Perfect Number as Totò the Butcher; Fabrizio Ferracane – The Traitor as Giuseppe Calò; Roberto Benigni – Pinocchio as Geppetto; Stefano Accorsi – The Champion as Valerio	**Best Supporting Actress**: **Valeria Golino – 5 Is the Perfect Number as Rita**‡; Alida Baldari Calabria – Pinocchio as Fairy with Turquoise Hair; Anna Ferzetti – Tomorrow's a New Day as Paola; Maria Amato – The Traitor as Melchiorra Buscetta; Tania Garribba – The First King: Birth of an Empire as Satnei
**Best Original Screenplay**: **The Traitor – Marco Bellocchio, Ludovica Rampoldi, Valia Santella and Francesco Piccolo**‡; Bangla – Phaim Bhuiyan and Vanessa Picciarelli; The First King: Birth of an Empire – Filippo Gravino, Francesca Manieri and Matteo Rovere; The Goddess of Fortune – Gianni Romoli, Silvia Ranfagni and Ferzan Özpetek; Remember? – Valerio Mieli	**Best Adapted Screenplay**: **Martin Eden – Maurizio Braucci and Pietro Marcello; based on the novel by Jack London**‡; The Bears' Famous Invasion of Sicily – Jean-Luc Fromental, Thomas Bidegain and Lorenzo Mattotti; based on the book by Dino Buzzati; The Mayor of Rione Sanità – Mario Martone and Ippolita Di Majo; based on the play by Eduardo De Filippo; Pinocchio – Matteo Garrone and Massimo Ceccherini; based on the novel The Adventures of Pinocchio by Carlo Collodi; Piranhas – Claudio Giovannesi, Roberto Saviano and Maurizio Braucci; based on the novel The Piranhas: The Boy Bosses of Naples by Roberto Saviano
**Best Cinematography**: **The First King: Birth of an Empire – Daniele Ciprì**‡; Martin Eden – Franco Di Giacomo; Pinocchio – Nicolaj Brüel; Remember? – Daria D'Antonio; The Traitor – Vladan Radovic	**Best Production Design**: **Pinocchio – Dimitri Capuani**‡; 5 Is the Perfect Number – Nello Giorgetti; The First King: Birth of an Empire – Tonino Zera; Suspiria – Inbal Weinberg; The Traitor – Andrea Castorina
**Best Score**: **Il flauto magico di Piazza Vittorio – Orchestra di Piazza Vittorio**‡; The First King: Birth of an Empire – Andrea Farri; Pinocchio – Dario Marianelli; Suspiria – Thom Yorke; The Traitor – Nicola Piovani	**Best Original Song**: **"Che vita meravigliosa" from The Goddess of Fortune – Music, Lyrics and Performed by Diodato**‡; "Festa" from Bangla – Music by Aiello; Lyrics by Aiello and Shoshi Md Ziaul; Performed by Moonstar Studio; "Rione Sanità" from The Mayor of Rione Sanità – Music, Lyrics and Performed by Ralph P; "Suspirium" from Suspiria – Music, Lyrics and Performed by Thom Yorke; "Un errore di distrazione" from The Guest – Music, Lyrics and Performed by Brunori Sas
**Best Editing**: **The Traitor – Francesca Calvelli**‡; The First King: Birth of an Empire – Gianni Vezzosi; Martin Eden – Aline Hervé and Fabrizio Federico; The Mayor of Rione Sanità – Jacopo Quadri; Pinocchio – Marco Spoletini	**Best Sound**: **The First King: Birth of an Empire – Angelo Bonanni, Davide D'Onofrio, Mirko Perri, Mauro Eusepi and Michele Mazzucco**‡; 5 Is the Perfect Number – Daniele Maraniello, Max Gobiet, Giuseppe D'Amato, Francesco Albertelli and Marcos Molina Jaime; Martin Eden – Denny de Angelis, Simone Panetta, Stefano Grosso and Michael Kaczmarek; The Traitor – Gaetano Carito, Adriano di Lorenzo, Pierpaolo Merafino, Lilio Rosato, Gianluca Basili and Francesco Tumminello; Pinocchio – Maricetta Lombardo, Gianni Pallotto, Luca Novelli, Daniela Bassani and Stefano Grosso
**Best Costumes**: **Pinocchio – Massimo Cantini Parrini**‡; 5 Is the Perfect Number – Nicoletta Taranta; The First King: Birth of an Empire – Valentina Taviani; Martin Eden – Andrea Cavalletto; The Traitor – Daria Calvelli	**Best Visual Effects**: **Pinocchio – Rodolfo Migliari and Theo Demeris**‡; 5 Is the Perfect Number – Giuseppe Squillaci; The First King: Birth of an Empire – Francesco Grisi and Gaia Bussolati; Suspiria – Luca Saviotti; The Traitor – Rodolfo Migliari
**Best Make-up Artist**: **Pinocchio – Dalia Colli and Mark Coulier**‡; 5 Is the Perfect Number – Andreina Becagli; The First King: Birth of an Empire – Roberto Pastore, Andrea Leanza, Valentina Visintin and Lorenzo Tamburini; Suspiria – Fernanda Perez; The Traitor – Dalia Colli and Lorenzo Tamburini	**Best Hairstylist**: **Pinocchio – Francesco Pegoretti**‡; The First King: Birth of an Empire – Marzia Colomba; Martin Eden – Daniela Tartari; Suspiria – Manolo García; The Traitor – Alberta Giuliani
**Best Documentary**: **Selfie – Agostino Ferrente, director**‡; Citizen Rosi – Didi Gnocchi and Carolina Rosi, directors; Fellini Never-Ending – Eugenio Cappuccio, director; The Mafia Is No Longer What It Used to Be – Franco Maresco, director; Se c'è un aldilà sono fottuto - Vita e cinema di Claudio Caligari – Simone Isola and Fausto Trombetta, directors	**Best Short Film**: **Timo's Winter – Giulio Mastromauro, director**‡; Brother – Beppe Tufarulo, director; My Sister – Saverio Cappiello, director; Our Time – Veronica Spedicati, director; Unfolded – Cristina Picchi, director
**Best Foreign Film**: **Parasite – Bong Joon-ho, director**‡; Green Book – Peter Farrelly, director; Joker – Todd Phillips, director; An Officer and a Spy – Roman Polanski, director; Once Upon a Time in Hollywood – Quentin Tarantino, director	**David Youth Award**: **My Brother Chases Dinosaurs – Stefano Cipani, director**‡; The Goddess of Fortune – Ferzan Özpetek, director; Into the Labyrinth – Donato Carrisi, director; Martin Eden – Pietro Marcello, director; The Traitor – Marco Bellocchio, director
**Special David Awards**: **Franca Valeri**	**David Audience Award**: **Once Upon a Time... in Bethlehem, directed by Ficarra e Picone for garnering 2,363,303 spectators**

== Films with multiple nominations and awards ==
Films that received multiple nominations
Nominations	Film
18	The Traitor
15	The First King: Birth of an Empire
15	Pinocchio
11	Martin Eden
9	5 Is the Perfect Number
6	Suspiria
4	Bangla
4	The Goddess of Fortune
4	The Mayor of Rione Sanità
3	Piranhas
3	Ricordi?
2	The Champion
2	My Brother Chases Dinosaurs

Films that received multiple awards
Awards	Film
6	The Traitor
5	Pinocchio
3	The First King: Birth of an Empire
2	The Goddess of Fortune
