= David di Donatello for Best Directorial Debut =

Italian film award

David di Donatello Award for Directorial Debut
- Country: Italy
- Presented by: Accademia del Cinema Italiano
- First award: 1982 (for directorial debut films released during the 1981–1982 film season)
- Currently held by: Margherita Vicario — Gloria! (2025)
- Website: daviddidonatello.it

The David di Donatello for Best Directorial Debut (Italian: David di Donatello per il miglior esordio alla regia), known as the David di Donatello for Best New Director (David di Donatello per il miglior regista esordiente) prior to 2023, is a film award presented annually since 1982 by the Accademia del Cinema Italiano (ACI, Academy of Italian Cinema) to recognize the outstanding feature-film directorial debut of a film director who has worked within the Italian film industry during the year preceding the ceremony. Nominees and winners are selected via runoff voting by all members of the Accademia.

== Winners and nominees ==
Below, winners are listed first in the colored row, followed by other nominees.

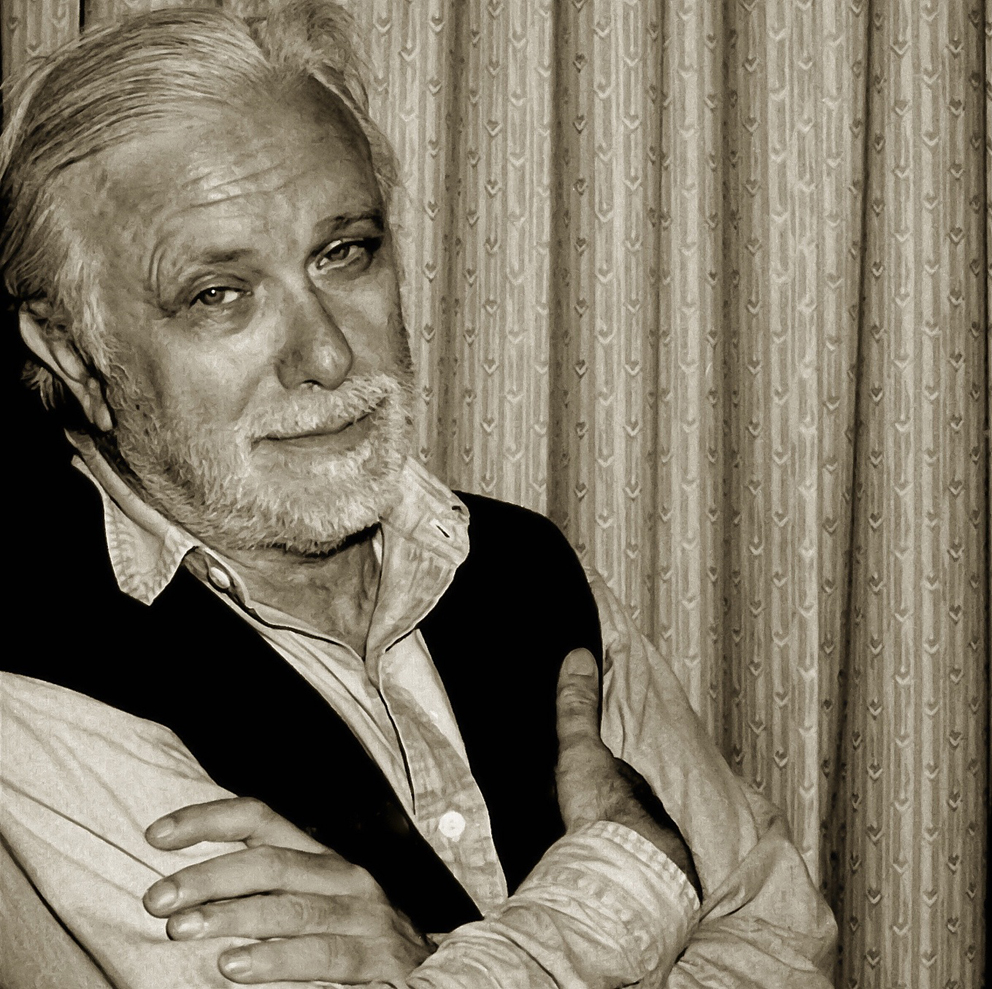
Luciano De Crescenzo won in 1985 for Così parlò Bellavista.

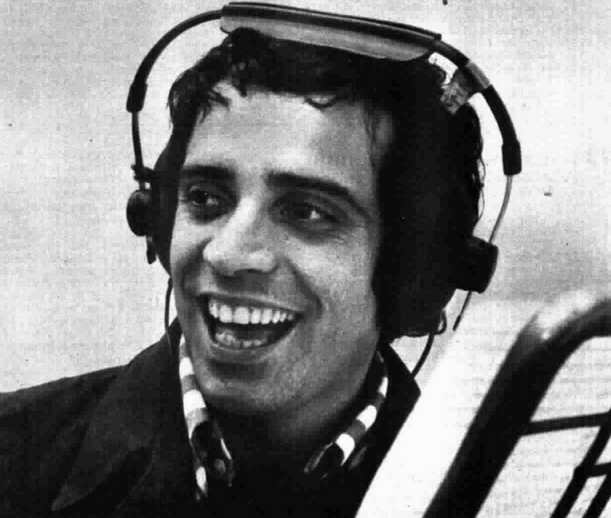
Enrico Montesano won in 1986 for A me mi piace.

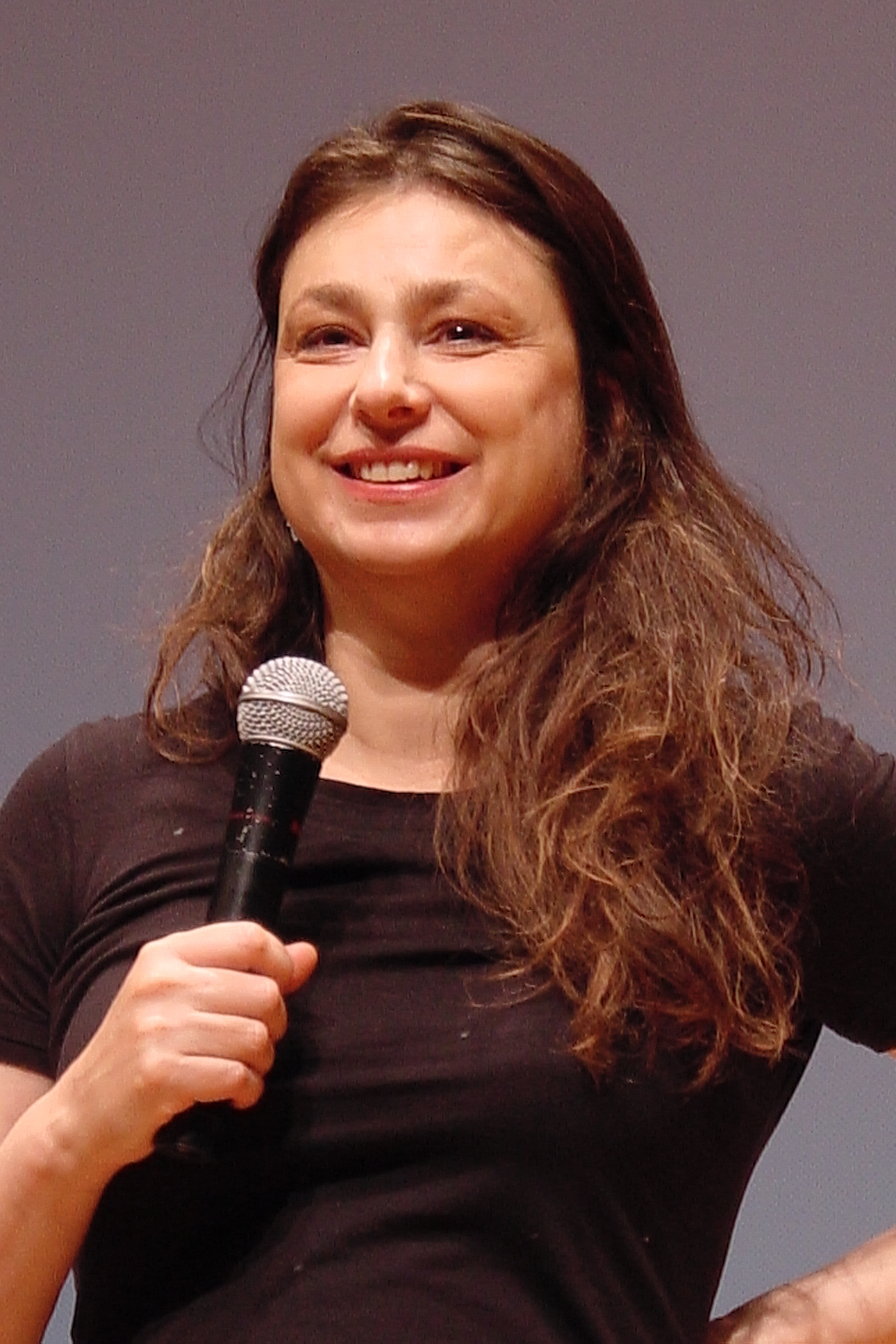
Francesca Archibugi won in 1989 for Mignon Has Come to Stay.

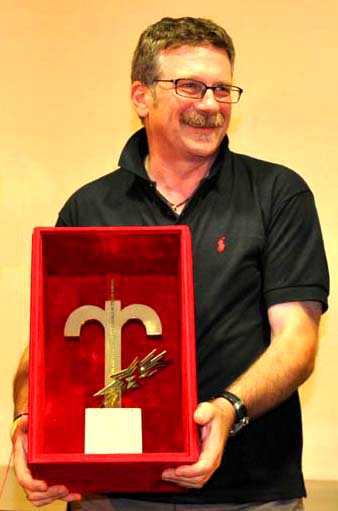
Alessandro D'Alatri won in 1991 for Red American.

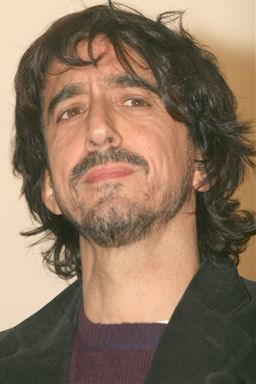
Sergio Rubini won in 1991 for The Station.

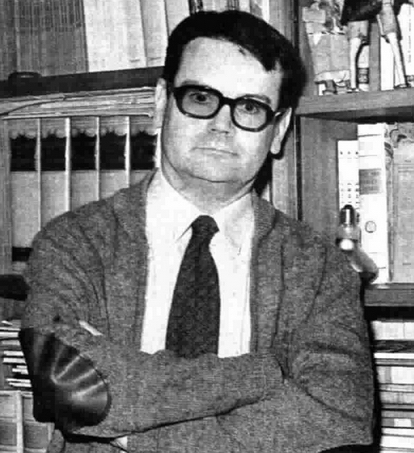
Massimo Scaglione won in 1992 for Angeli a Sud.

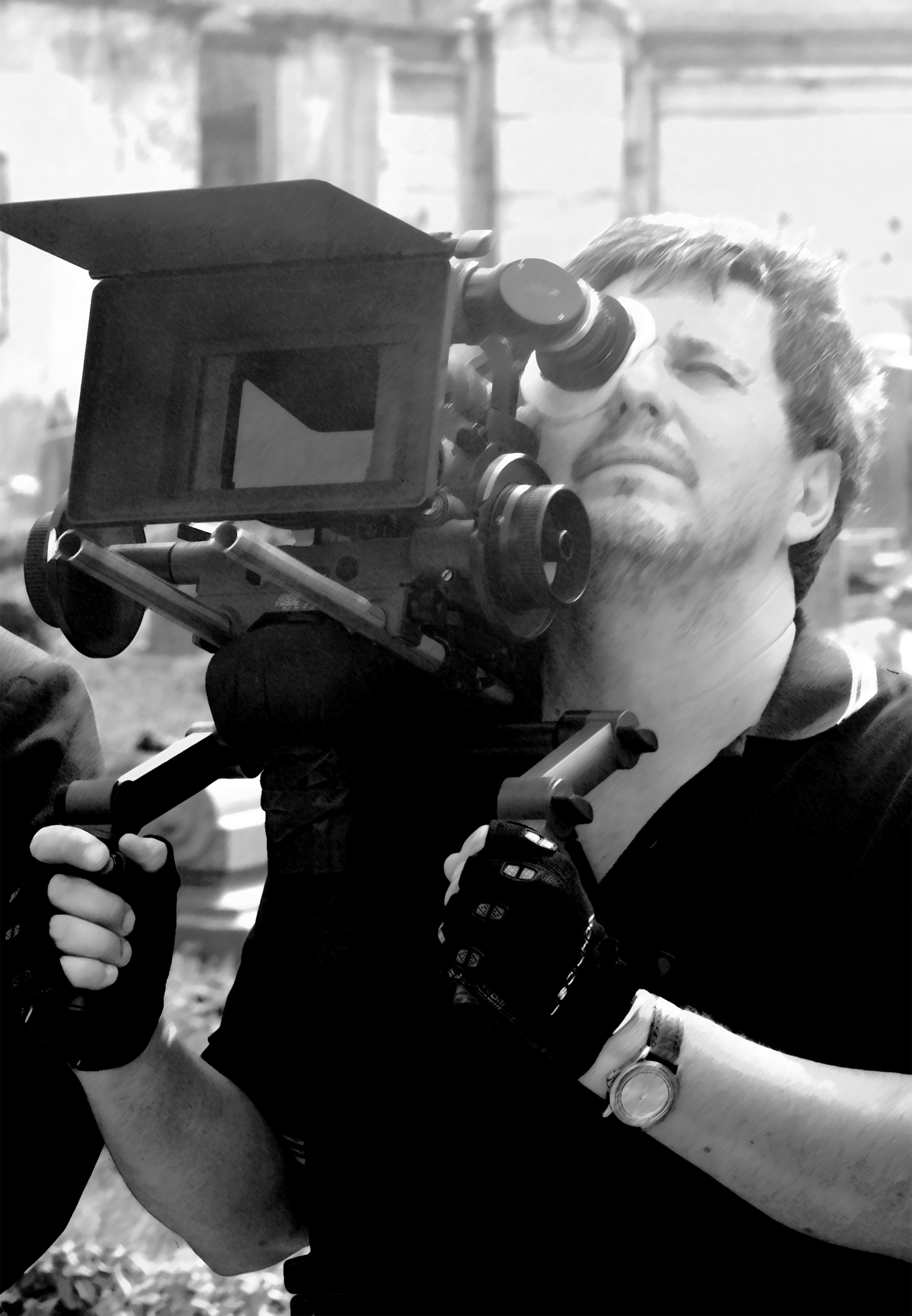
Maurizio Zaccaro won in 1992 for Where the Night Begins.

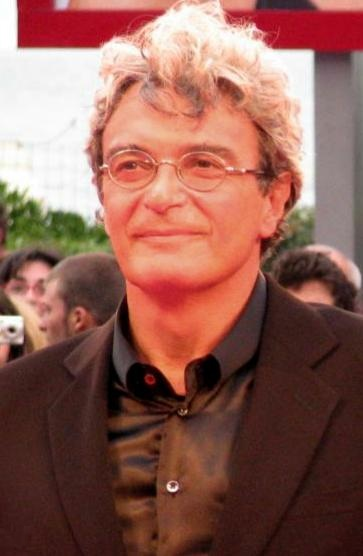
Mario Martone won in 1993 for Death of a Neapolitan Mathematician.

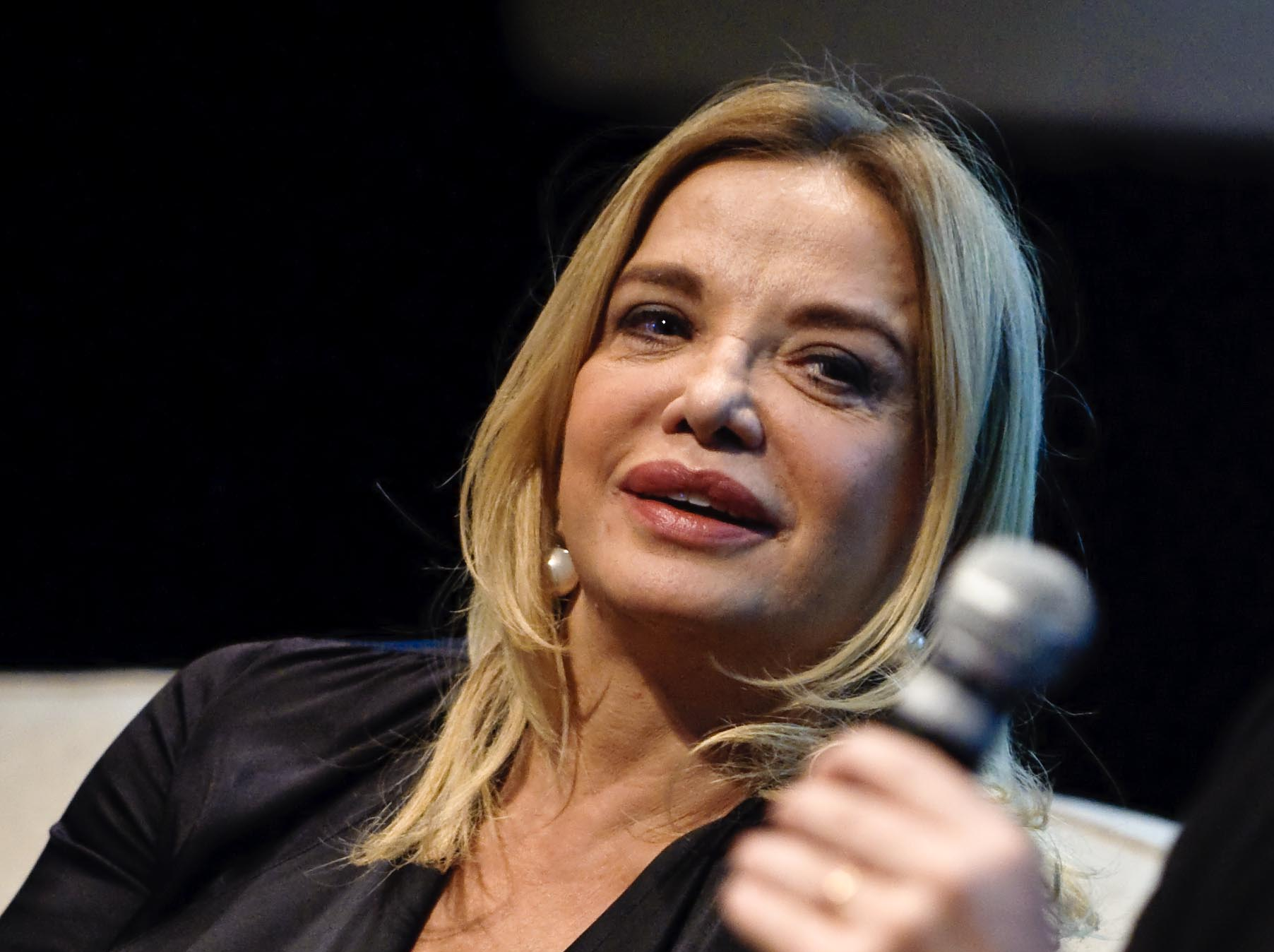
Simona Izzo won in 1994 for Sentimental Maniacs.

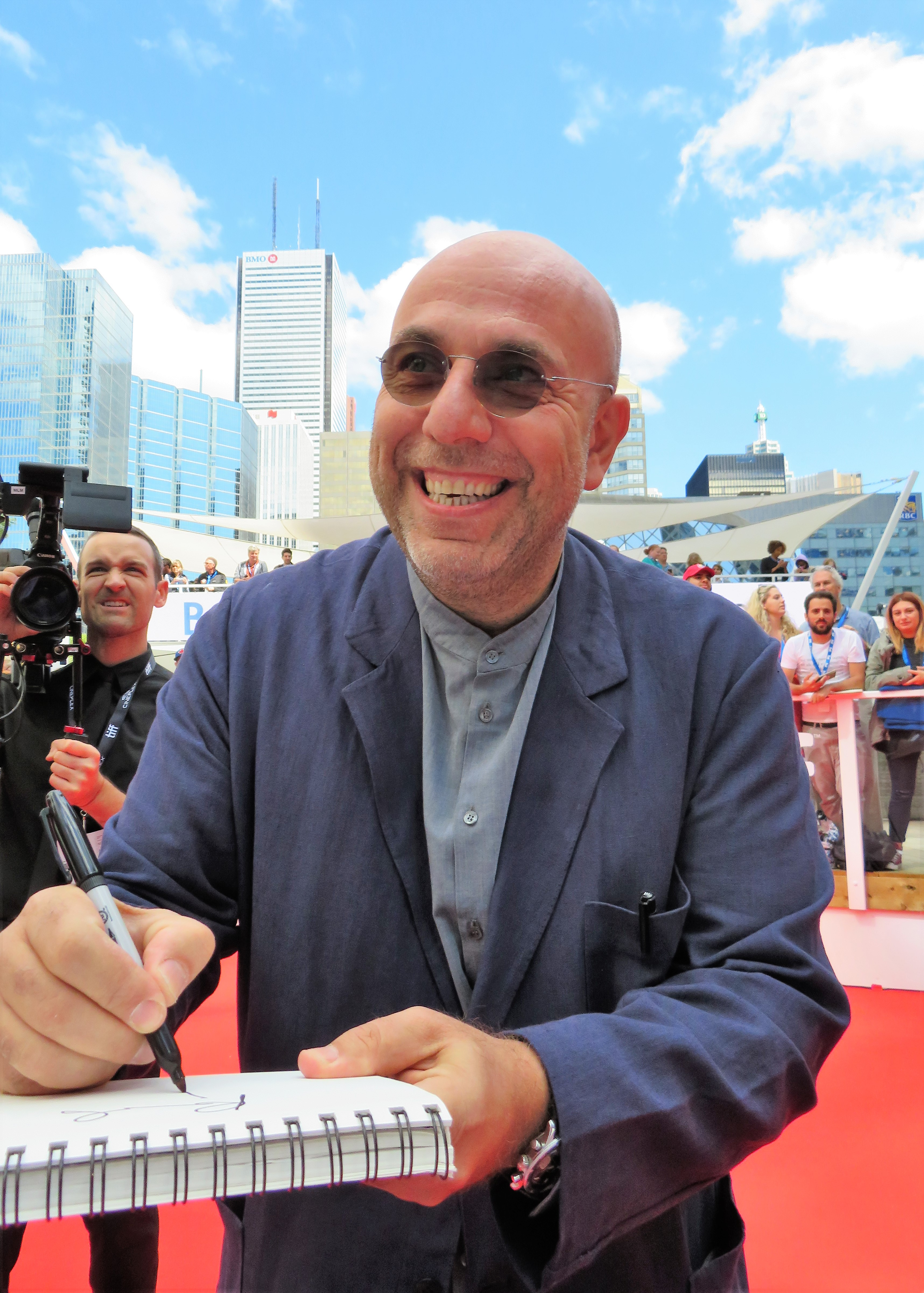
Paolo Virzì won in 1995 for Living It Up.

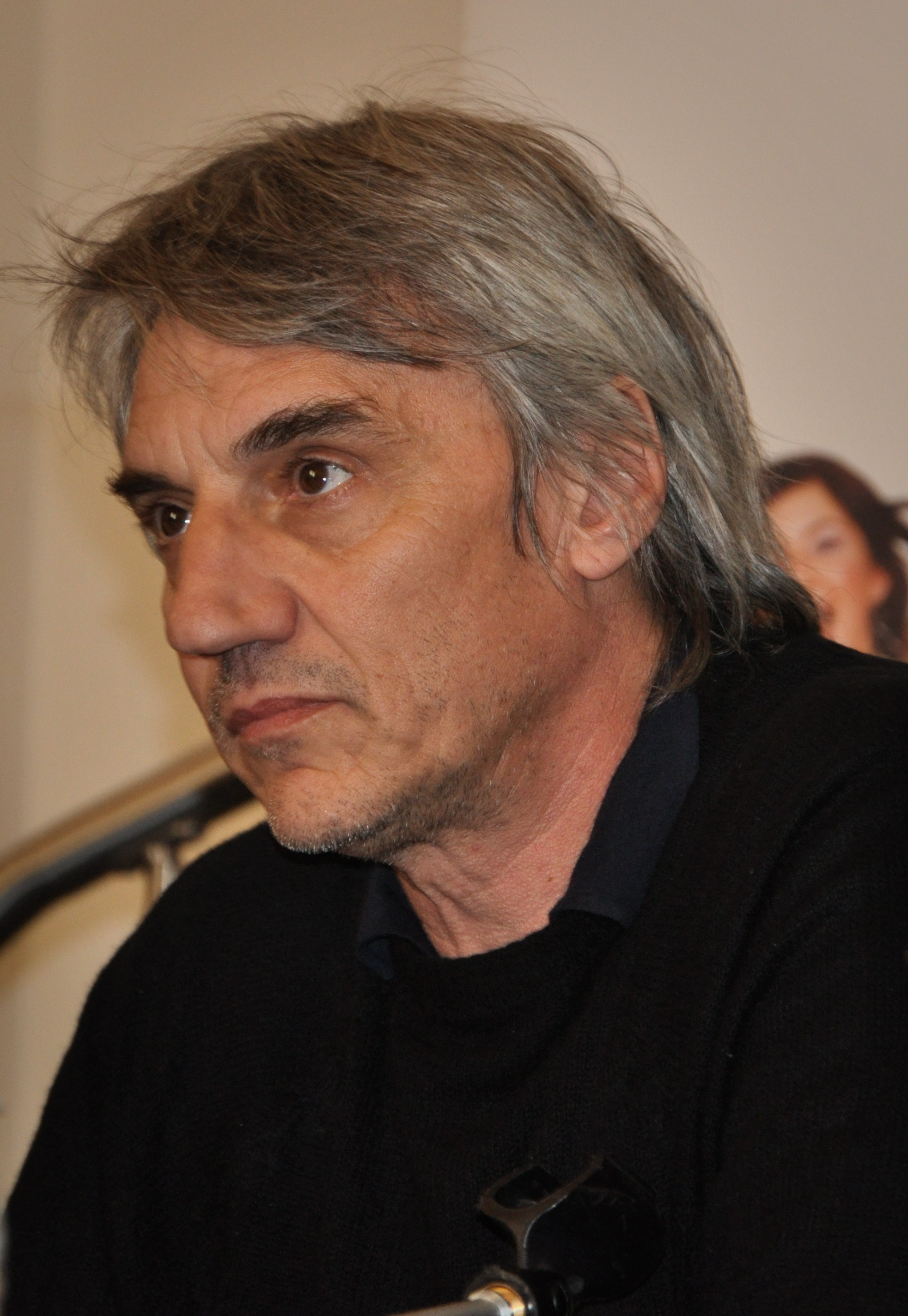
Mimmo Calopresti won in 1996 for The Second Time.

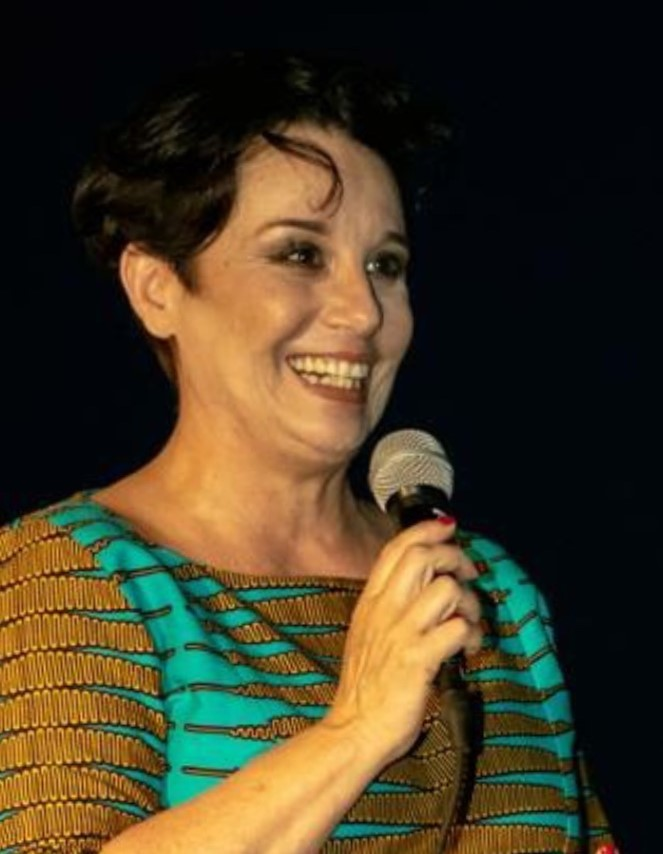
Roberta Torre won in 1998 for To Die for Tano.

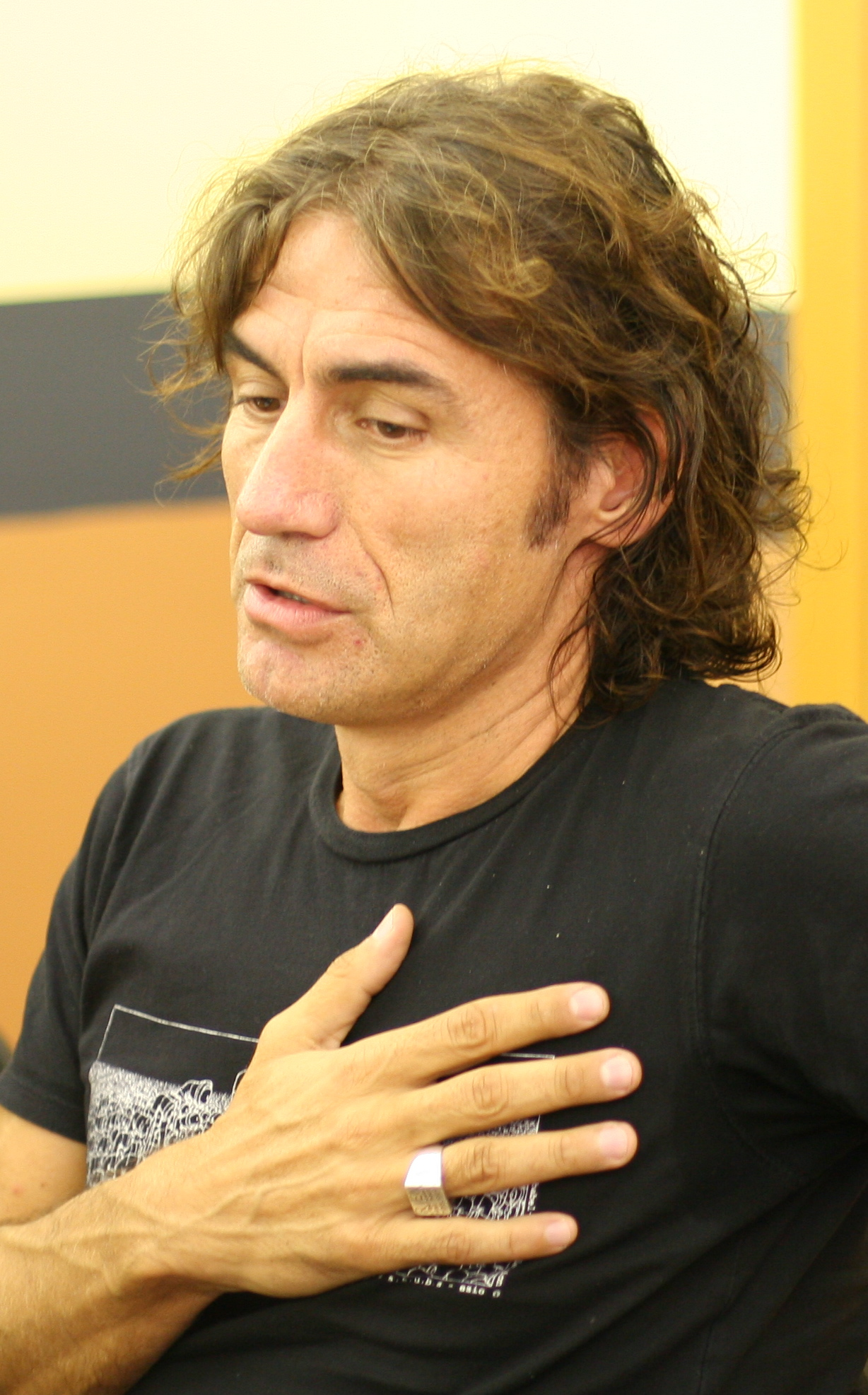
Luciano Ligabue won in 1999 for Radiofreccia.

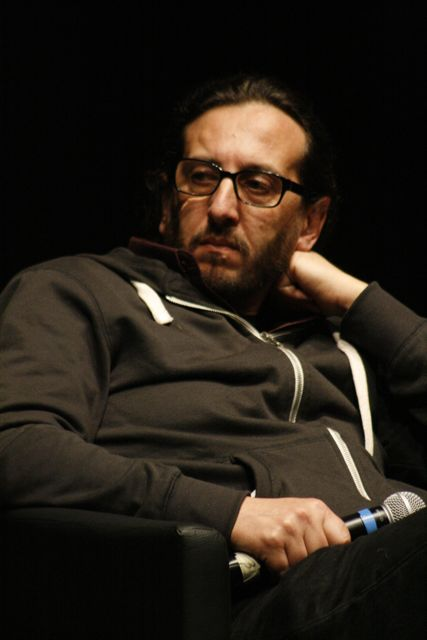
Daniele Vicari won in 2003 for Maximum Velocity (V-Max).

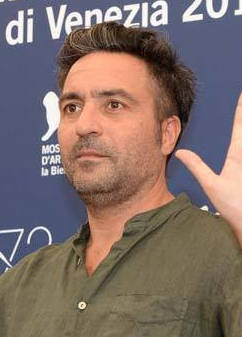
Saverio Costanzo won in 2005 for Private.

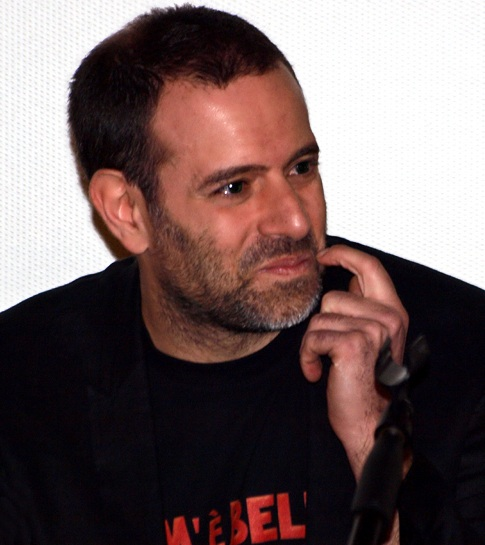
Fausto Brizzi won in 2006 for Notte prima degli esami.

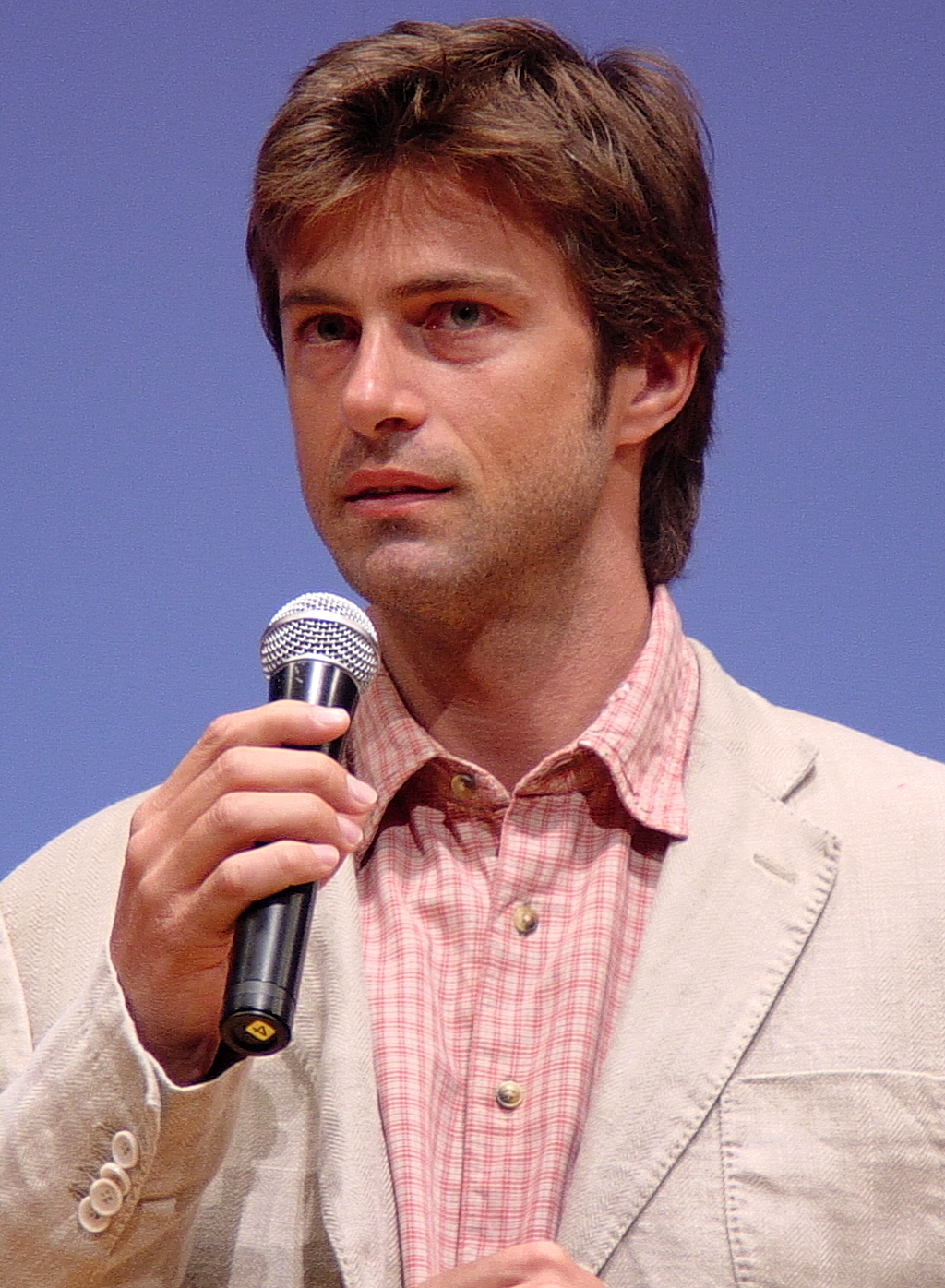
Kim Rossi Stuart won in 2007 for Along the Ridge.

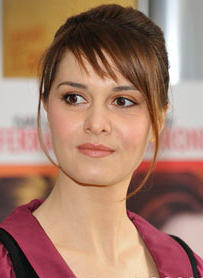
Paola Cortellesi won in 2024 with There's Still Tomorrow.

=== 1980s ===
Year	Director	Film	Ref.
1981/82 (27th)
1981/82 (27th)	Luciano Manuzzi	Off Season	
1981/82 (27th)	Alessandro Benvenuti	West of Paperino	
1981/82 (27th)	Enzo De Caro	Prima che sia troppo presto	
1982/83 (28th)
1982/83 (28th)	Francesco Laudadio	Grog	
1982/83 (28th)	Roberto Benigni	Tu mi turbi	
1982/83 (28th)	Marco Risi	I'm Going to Live by Myself	
1982/83 (28th)	Cinzia TH Torrini	Giocare d'azzardo	
1983/84 (29th)
1983/84 (29th)	Roberto Russo	Flirt	
1983/84 (29th)	Giacomo Battiato	Hearts and Armour	
1983/84 (29th)	Francesca Marciano and Stefania Casini	Lontano da dove	
1984/85 (30th)
1984/85 (30th)	Luciano De Crescenzo	Così parlò Bellavista	
1984/85 (30th)	Francesca Comencini	Pianoforte	
1984/85 (30th)	Francesco Nuti	Casablanca, Casablanca	
1985/86 (31st)
1985/86 (31st)	Enrico Montesano	A me mi piace	
1985/86 (31st)	Amanzio Todini	Big Deal After 20 Years	
1985/86 (31st)	Valerio Zecca	Chi mi aiuta?	
1986/87 (32nd)
1986/87 (32nd)	Giorgio Treves	The Malady of Love	
1986/87 (32nd)	Antonietta De Lillo and Giorgio Magliulo	Una casa in bilico	
1986/87 (32nd)	Giuseppe Tornatore	The Professor	
1987/88 (33rd)
1987/88 (33rd)	Daniele Luchetti	It's Happening Tomorrow	
1987/88 (33rd)	Carlo Mazzacurati	Italian Night	
1987/88 (33rd)	Stefano Reali	Down There in the Jungle	
1988/89 (34th)
1988/89 (34th)	Francesca Archibugi	Mignon Has Come to Stay	
1988/89 (34th)	Massimo Guglielmi	Rebus	
1988/89 (34th)	Sergio Staino	Cavalli si nasce	

=== 1990s ===
Year	Director	Film	Ref.
1989/90 (35th)
1989/90 (35th)	Ricky Tognazzi	Little Misunderstandings	
1989/90 (35th)	Gianfranco Cabiddu	Disamistade	
1989/90 (35th)	Giacomo Campiotti	Corsa di primavera	
1989/90 (35th)	Livia Giampalmo	Evelina e i suoi figli	
1989/90 (35th)	Monica Vitti	Secret Scandal	
1990/91 (36th)
1990/91 (36th)	Alessandro D'Alatri	Red American	
1990/91 (36th)	Sergio Rubini	The Station	
1990/91 (36th)	Christian De Sica	Faccione	
1990/91 (36th)	Antonio Monda	Dicembre	
1990/91 (36th)	Michele Placido	Pummarò	
1991/92 (37th)
1991/92 (37th)	Massimo Scaglione	Angeli a sud	
1991/92 (37th)	Maurizio Zaccaro	Where the Night Begins	
1991/92 (37th)	Giulio Base	Crack	
1992/93 (38th)
1992/93 (38th)	Mario Martone	Death of a Neapolitan Mathematician	
1992/93 (38th)	Carlo Carlei	Flight of the Innocent	
1992/93 (38th)	Pasquale Pozzessere	Verso Sud	
1993/94 (39th)
1993/94 (39th)	Simona Izzo	Sentimental Maniacs	
1993/94 (39th)	Francesco Ranieri Martinotti	Abissinia	
1993/94 (39th)	Leone Pompucci	Mille bolle blu	
1994/95 (40th)
1994/95 (40th)	Paolo Virzì	Living It Up	
1994/95 (40th)	Sandro Baldoni	Weird Tales	
1994/95 (40th)	Alberto Simone	Colpo di luna	
1995/96 (41st)
1995/96 (41st)	Mimmo Calopresti	The Second Time	
1995/96 (41st)	Stefano Incerti	The Meter Reader	
1995/96 (41st)	Leonardo Pieraccioni	The Graduates	
1996/97 (42nd)
1996/97 (42nd)	Fulvio Ottaviano	Growing Artichokes in Mimongo	
1996/97 (42nd)	Franco Bernini	The Grey Zone	
1996/97 (42nd)	Ugo Chiti	Albergo Roma	
1996/97 (42nd)	Roberto Cimpanelli	A Cold, Cold Winter	
1996/97 (42nd)	Anna Di Francesca	No Spring Chicken	
1997/98 (43rd)
1997/98 (43rd)	Roberta Torre	To Die for Tano	
1997/98 (43rd)	Aldo, Giovanni & Giacomo and Massimo Venier	Three Men and a Leg	
1997/98 (43rd)	Riccardo Milani	Auguri professore	
1998/99 (44th)
1998/99 (44th)	Luciano Ligabue	Radiofreccia	
1998/99 (44th)	Giuseppe M. Gaudino	Giro di lune tra terra e mare	
1998/99 (44th)	Gabriele Muccino	Ecco fatto	

=== 2000s ===
Year	Director	Film	Ref.
1999/00 (45th)
1999/00 (45th)	Alessandro Piva	La capa gira	
1999/00 (45th)	Andrea and Antonio Frazzi	Il cielo cade	
1999/00 (45th)	Piergiorgio Gay and Roberto San Pietro	Three Stories	
2000/01 (46th)
2000/01 (46th)	Alex Infascelli	Almost Blue	
2000/01 (46th)	Roberto Andò	The Prince's Manuscript	
2000/01 (46th)	Rolando Stefanelli	Il prezzo	
2001/02 (47th)
2001/02 (47th)	Marco Ponti	Santa Maradona	
2001/02 (47th)	Vincenzo Marra	Sailing Home	
2001/02 (47th)	Paolo Sorrentino	L'uomo in più	
2002/03 (48th)
2002/03 (48th)	Daniele Vicari	Maximum Velocity (V-Max)	
2002/03 (48th)	Francesco Falaschi	I Am Emma	
2002/03 (48th)	Michele Mellara and Alessandro Rossi	Fortezza Bastiani	
2002/03 (48th)	Marco Simon Puccioni	What Are You Looking For	
2002/03 (48th)	Spiro Scimone and Francesco Sframeli	Two Friends	
2003/04 (49th)
2003/04 (49th)	Salvatore Mereu	Three-Step Dance	
2003/04 (49th)	Andrea Manni	The Fugitive	
2003/04 (49th)	Francesco Patierno	Pater Familias	
2003/04 (49th)	Piero Sanna	La destinazione	
2003/04 (49th)	Maria Sole Tognazzi	Past Perfect	
2004/05 (50th)
2004/05 (50th)	Saverio Costanzo	Private	
2004/05 (50th)	Paolo Franchi	The Spectator	
2004/05 (50th)	David Grieco	Evilenko	
2004/05 (50th)	Stefano Mordini	Smalltown, Italy	
2004/05 (50th)	Paolo Vari and Antonio Bocola	Chemical Hunger	
2005/06 (51st)
2005/06 (51st)	Fausto Brizzi	Notte prima degli esami	
2005/06 (51st)	Vittorio Moroni	Tu devi essere il lupo	
2005/06 (51st)	Francesco Munzi	Saimir	
2005/06 (51st)	Fausto Paravidino	Texas	
2005/06 (51st)	Stefano Pasetto	Tartarughe sul dorso	
2006/07 (52nd)
2006/07 (52nd)	Kim Rossi Stuart	Along the Ridge	
2006/07 (52nd)	Alessandro Angelini	Salty Air	
2006/07 (52nd)	Francesco Amato	What the Hell Am I Doing Here?	
2006/07 (52nd)	Giambattista Avellino, and Ficarra e Picone	Il 7 e l'8	
2006/07 (52nd)	Davide Marengo	Night Bus	
2007/08 (53rd)
2007/08 (53rd)	Andrea Molaioli	The Girl by the Lake	
2007/08 (53rd)	Fabrizio Bentivoglio	Don't Waste Your Time, Johnny!	
2007/08 (53rd)	Giorgio Diritti	The Wind Blows Round	
2007/08 (53rd)	Marco Martani	Concrete Romance	
2007/08 (53rd)	Silvio Muccino	Parlami d'amore	
2008/09 (54th)
2008/09 (54th)	Gianni Di Gregorio	Mid-August Lunch	
2008/09 (54th)	Marco Amenta	The Sicilian Girl	
2008/09 (54th)	Umberto Carteni	Different from Whom?	
2008/09 (54th)	Tony D'Angelo	Una notte	
2008/09 (54th)	Marco Pontecorvo	Pa-ra-da	

=== 2010s ===
Year	Director	Film	Ref.
2009/10 (55th)
2009/10 (55th)	Valerio Mieli	Ten Winters	
2009/10 (55th)	Giuseppe Capotondi	The Double Hour	
2009/10 (55th)	Marco Chiarini	L'uomo fiammifero	
2009/10 (55th)	Susanna Nicchiarelli	Cosmonaut	
2009/10 (55th)	Claudio Noce	Good Morning Aman	
2010/11 (56th)
2010/11 (56th)	Rocco Papaleo	Basilicata Coast to Coast	
2010/11 (56th)	Aureliano Amadei	20 Cigarettes	
2010/11 (56th)	Massimiliano Bruno	Escort in Love	
2010/11 (56th)	Edoardo Leo	18 Years Later	
2010/11 (56th)	Paola Randi	Into Paradiso	
2011/12 (57th)
2011/12 (57th)	Francesco Bruni	Easy!	
2011/12 (57th)	Guido Lombardi	Là-bas: A Criminal Education	
2011/12 (57th)	Alice Rohrwacher	Heavenly Body	
2011/12 (57th)	Andrea Segre	Shun Li and the Poet	
2011/12 (57th)	Stefano Sollima	ACAB - All Cops Are Bastards	
2012/13 (58th)
2012/13 (58th)	Leonardo Di Costanzo	The Interval	
2012/13 (58th)	Giorgia Farina	Amiche da morire	
2012/13 (58th)	Alessandro Gassmann	The Mongrel	
2012/13 (58th)	Luigi Lo Cascio	The Ideal City	
2012/13 (58th)	Laura Morante	Cherry on the Cake	
2013/14 (59th)
2013/14 (59th)	Pif	The Mafia Kills Only in Summer	
2013/14 (59th)	Valeria Golino	Miele	
2013/14 (59th)	Fabio Grassadonia and Antonio Piazza	Salvo	
2013/14 (59th)	Matteo Oleotto	Zoran, My Nephew the Idiot	
2013/14 (59th)	Sydney Sibilia	I Can Quit Whenever I Want	
2014/15 (60th)
2014/15 (60th)	Edoardo Falcone	God Willing	
2014/15 (60th)	Laura Bispuri	Sworn Virgin	
2014/15 (60th)	Eleonora Danco	N-Capace	
2014/15 (60th)	Andrea Jublin	Banana	
2014/15 (60th)	Lamberto Sanfelice	Chlorine	
2015/16 (61st)
2015/16 (61st)	Gabriele Mainetti	They Call Me Jeeg	
2015/16 (61st)	Alberto Caviglia	Burning Love	
2015/16 (61st)	Carlo Lavagna	Arianna	
2015/16 (61st)	Piero Messina	The Wait	
2015/16 (61st)	Francesco Miccichè and Fabio Bonifacci	Them Who?	
2015/16 (61st)	Adriano Valerio	Banat	
2016/17 (62nd)
2016/17 (62nd)	Marco Danieli	Worldly Girl	
2016/17 (62nd)	Lorenzo Corvino	WAX: We Are the X	
2016/17 (62nd)	Fabio Guaglione and Fabio Resinaro	Mine	
2016/17 (62nd)	Marco Segato	La pelle dell'orso	
2016/17 (62nd)	Michele Vannucci	I Was a Dreamer	
2017/18 (63rd)
2017/18 (63rd)	Donato Carrisi	The Girl in the Fog	
2017/18 (63rd)	Cosimo Gomez	Ugly Nasty People	
2017/18 (63rd)	Roberto De Paolis	Pure Hearts	
2017/18 (63rd)	Andrea De Sica	Children of the Night	
2017/18 (63rd)	Andrea Magnani	Easy	
2018/19 (64th)
2018/19 (64th)	Alessio Cremonini	On My Skin	
2018/19 (64th)	Damiano and Fabio D'Innocenzo	Boys Cry	
2018/19 (64th)	Luca Facchini	Fabrizio De André - Principe libero	
2018/19 (64th)	Valerio Mastandrea	Ride	
2018/19 (64th)	Simone Spada	Hotel Gagarin	

=== 2020s ===
Year	Director	Film	Ref.
2020 (65th)
2020 (65th)	Phaim Bhuyian	Bangla	
2020 (65th)	Igort	5 Is the Perfect Number	
2020 (65th)	Leonardo D'Agostini	The Champion	
2020 (65th)	Marco D'Amore	The Immortal	
2020 (65th)	Carlo Sironi	Sole	
2021 (66th)
2021 (66th)	Pietro Castellitto	The Predators	
2021 (66th)	Ginevra Elkann	If Only	
2021 (66th)	Mauro Mancini	Thou Shalt Not Hate	
2021 (66th)	Alice Filippi	Out of My League	
2021 (66th)	Luca Medici	Tolo Tolo	
2022 (67th)
2022 (67th)	Laura Samani	Small Body	
2022 (67th)	Gianluca Jodice	The Bad Poet	
2022 (67th)	Maura Delpero	Maternal	
2022 (67th)	Alessio Rigo de Righi, Matteo Zoppis	The Tale of King Crab	
2022 (67th)	Francesco Costabile	Una Femmina: The Code of Silence	
2023 (68th)
2023 (68th)	Giulia Steigerwalt	September	
2023 (68th)	Carolina Cavalli	Amanda	
2023 (68th)	Jasmine Trinca	Marcel!	
2023 (68th)	Niccolò Falsetti	Margins	
2023 (68th)	Vincenzo Pirrotta	The Bone Breakers	
2024 (69th)
2024 (69th)	Paola Cortellesi	There's Still Tomorrow	
2024 (69th)	Giacomo Abbruzzese	Disco Boy	
2024 (69th)	Giuseppe Fiorello	Fireworks	
2024 (69th)	Micaela Ramazzotti	Felicità	
2024 (69th)	Michele Riondino	Palazzina Laf	
2025 (70th)
2025 (70th)	Margherita Vicario	Gloria!	
2025 (70th)	Loris Lai	How Kids Roll	
2025 (70th)	Neri Marcorè	Zamora	
2025 (70th)	Edgardo Pistone	Ciao bambino	
2025 (70th)	Gianluca Santoni	My Killer Buddy	
2026 (71st)
2026 (71st)	Margherita Spampinato	Sweetheart	
2026 (71st)	Alissa Jung	Paternal Leave	
2026 (71st)	Alberto Palmiero	Tienimi presente	
2026 (71st)	Ludovica Rampoldi	A Brief Affair	
2026 (71st)	Greta Scarano	Siblings	

== See also ==
- Nastro d'Argento for Best New Director
- Cinema of Italy
