= Bangladeshis in Italy =

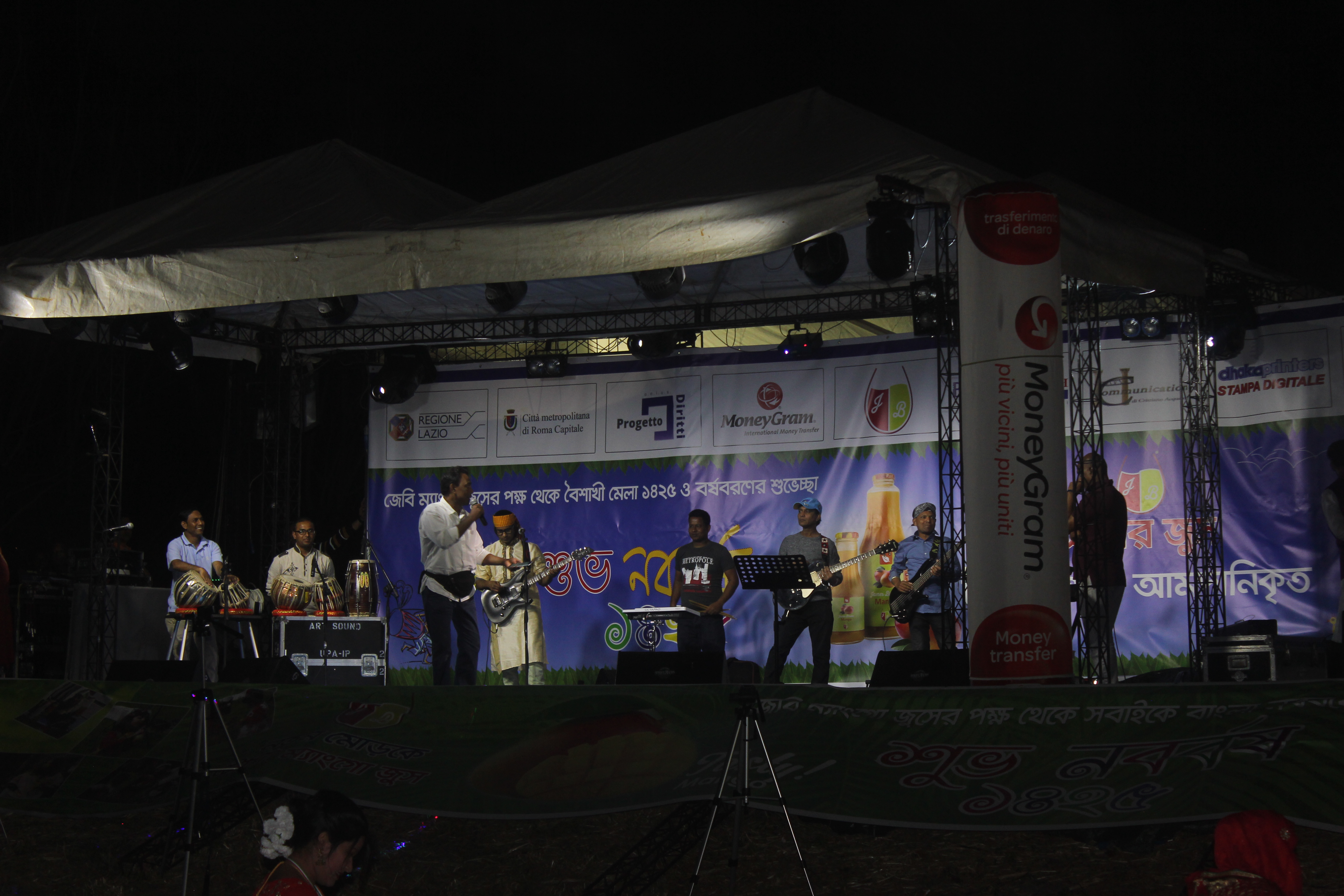
- Boishakhi Mela, celebrated by Italian Bangladeshis in Rome

Total population
- 200,000 (2023)

Regions with significant populations
- Lazio, Lombardy, Veneto

Languages
- Bengali, Italian, English

Religion
- Islam, Hinduism, Christianity

Related ethnic groups
- Bangladeshi diaspora, British Bangladeshis, Bangladeshi Americans

Bangladeshis are one of the largest immigrant populations in Italy. As per the Italian Ministry of Labour and Social Policies annual report 2022, there were approximately 150,692 Bangladeshis living in Italy. However, in 2024, the Italian ambassador to Bangladesh, Antonio Alessandro, stated in an interview that the figure is around 175,000-200,000, including undocumented migrants.

== History ==
Bangladeshis first started immigrating to Italy in the 1980s, following the independence of Bangladesh in 1971. Many were skilled graduates attracted by career opportunities in industrial Northern Italy. Between late 1989 and mid-1990, the 200–300 Bangladeshis living in Rome increased by an estimated twenty-fold to become the largest Bangladeshi community in continental Europe. Subsequently, the population in Rome doubled in size, mainly through undocumented migration, to an estimated 10,000 people as of 1995. There are also a significant number of Bangladeshis in Sicily.

From 2012, over 20,000 Italian Bangladeshis migrated to the United Kingdom with the advent of Italy's manufacturing decline. The majority of them settled within the British Bangladeshi community in Tower Hamlets, Redbridge and Newham.

== Demography ==
Most of the Bangladeshis in Italy hail from the districts of Comilla, Dhaka, Faridpur, and Noakhali. 71.6% of them are male. 59% of the Bangladeshi population (15 years and older) is employed – a figure two percentage points higher than that recorded for the non-EU nationals in the country. The Bangladeshi community in Italy has an unemployment rate of 11%, slightly lower than the whole of non-EU nationals. The service sector absorbs over 70% of the workers belonging to the community. The percentage of Bangladeshis employed in industry is 22%. About 33% of Bangladeshis employed earn a monthly income below €800. Preponderant is the income class between €800 and €1,200, accounting for 48% of the community's employed.

== In popular culture ==
The Italian blockbuster Bangla was released in 2019, which won awards for two consecutive years after its release. The film displayed the current situation of Bangladeshis in Italy. On 13 April 2022, its sequel TV series, directed by Phaim Bhuiyan and Emanuele Scaringi, was released.

== See also ==
- Bangladesh–Italy relations
- Bangladeshi diaspora
- Immigration to Italy
