= Phaim Bhuiyan =

Italian actor and filmmaker (born 1995)

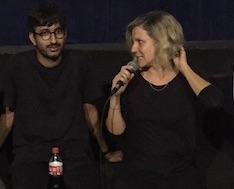
- Bhuiyan and Vanessa Picciarelli during the presentation of Bangla
- Born: 31 October 1995 (age 30); Rome, Italy
- Education: Istituto Europeo di Design
- Occupations: director; actor; producer

Mohammad Phaim Bhuiyan (Bengali: ফাহিম ভূঁইয়া, pronounced [ˈfa(h)im ˈbʱũ(i)e̯a]; born 31 October 1995) is an Italian actor, producer and filmmaker.

== Early life and education ==
Bhuiyan was born in Rome from parents of Bangladeshi origin and grew up in the Torpignattara district. He attended IPS Virginia Woolf high-school in Circonvallazione Casilina, Rome. After high school, he attended Istituto Europeo di Design with a scholarship.

== Career ==
Bhuiyan directed, produced, written and acted on the film Bangla which was awarded the Globo d'oro as best first work with the Nastro d'argento for the best comedy of the 2019. The same year he participated in the episodes of the program "Viva RaiPlay!" hosted by Rosario Fiorello.

On 8 May 2020 he won the David di Donatello in the best new director category. Same month he directs a music-video call "Miami a Fregene" of the singer-songwriter Avincola.

In 2021 he was included on Forbes 30 Under 30-Europe 2021: Entertainment ranking. Later on he became one of the judges for Forbes 30 under 30-Europe 2023: Entertainment.

On 13 April 2022, Bangla - La serie was released, directed by Bhuiyan and Emanuele Scaringi, a sequel to his 2019 film.

== Filmography ==
=== Film ===
Year	Title	Role	Notes & Ref.
2016	Spazio alle storie	Assistant Director	Short film
2018	La profezia dell'armadillo	Assistant Director	
2019	Bangla	Director, Writer and Protagonist	

=== Television ===
Year	Title	Role	Notes & Ref.
2017	Yoroi	Director	1 episode, 2017
2017	Io e il marziano	Assistant Director	Television Series
2019	Riders-La serie	Cast member	1 episode, 2019
2019	Bangla Kitchen	Director, Writer and Cast member	4 episodes, 2019
2020	Nuove Strade	Self	1 episode, 2020
2022	Bangla - La serie	Director, Writer and Protagonist	8 episodes, 2022

=== Song ===
Year	Song	Singer	Role	Notes & Ref.
2020	Miami a Fregene	Avincola	Director	Music Video

== Awards and nominations ==
Year	Award	Category	Work	Result	Ref.
2019	Hamburg International Film Festival	Best Production	Bangla	Nominated	
2019	Nastro d'argento	Best Comedy	Bangla	Won	
2019	International Film Festival Rotterdam	Big Screen Award	Bangla	Nominated	
2019	Globo d'oro	Best First Feature	Bangla	Won	
2020	Festival del Cinema Europeo	Mario Verdone Award	Bangla	Won	
2020	David di Donatello	Best Debut Director	Bangla	Won	
2020	David di Donatello	Best Original Screenplay	Bangla	Nominated	
2022	Premi Flaiano	Best Male Performance in the Youth Section	Bangla - La serie	Won	
2022	Terni Film Festival	Miglior serie televisiva	Bangla - La serie	Won	
2022	Nastro d'argento	Miglior Serie Commedia	Bangla - La serie	Won	
2022	Giffoni Film Festival	Explosive Talent Award	Bangla	Won	

== See also ==
- Italian film directors
- Bangladeshi-Italian
