= Bangla - La serie =

Italian television series

- Genre: Comedy drama; Romance film
- Written by: Phaim Bhuiyan; Emanuele Scaringi; Vanessa Picciarelli
- Directed by: Emanuele Scaringi; Phaim Bhuiyan
- Starring: see Cast section
- Music by: Dario Lanzellotti; Pino Pecorelli
- Country of origin: Italy
- Original language: Italian
- No. of series: 1
- No. of episodes: 8

Production
- Producers: Laura Paolucci; Domenico Procacci
- Cinematography: Simone D'Onofrio
- Editors: Micaela Natascia Di Vito; Steve Flamini; Gianluca Scarpa
- Running time: 25–29 minutes
- Production companies: Fandango; Rai Fiction

Original release
- Network: RaiPlay; Rai 3
- Release: 13 April – 6 May 2022

Bangla – La serie is an Italian comedy romance television series created for RaiPlay by Emanuele Scaringi, who wrote the script along with Phaim Bhuiyan and Vanessa Picciarelli. Scaringi directed the series, along with Phaim Bhuiyan, the latter of whom directed the prequel film Bangla. The series was produced by Laura Paolucci and Domenico Procacci of Fandango along with Rai Fiction.

The series was filmed across Rome, mostly shot in Tor Pignattara, where the director and main cast Bhuiyan was born. Some clips of the ending episode was filmed on Fiumicino Airport. Simone D'Onofrio served as the cinematographer, with Micaela Natascia Di Vito, Steve Flamini, and Gianluca Scarpa being the editor of the series. The series screened at Torino Film Festival in 2021.

== Premise ==
Phaim Bhuiyan is a second-generation boy born and raised in Italy with strong traditional values instilled by his Bangladeshi parents. However, things take a turn when he falls in love with Asia, a rebellious and free-spirited girl from an atheist family.

Despite the significant clash of their cultural backgrounds, Phaim and Asia are willing to compromise to experience the genuine love they share. However, Phaim's families culture and traditions put the relationship in a crisis.

Phaim's father Shipon, a dreamer and an idealist, who wants to move to London. On the other hand, Asia's father Olmo is explosive and overwhelming, but passionate about everything except his back pain and constant conflicts with his ex-wife. Along with Olmo, Asia's mother also shows her approval of their relationship.

Phaim's sister Navila is in constant "siblings" conflict with him, while his cousin and roommate Sumaya tries to help him navigate his personal and love life. His friend Matteo always sits in the same bench, giving him advice and smoking weed.

In contrast, the Imam of the local mosque, Rifat, who is also a friend of Phaim, helps him through this crisis and supports him. Asia's best friend Fede is always there to support her in her decisions as well.

As they both try to navigate their love and cultural differences, they also find themselves surrounded by other quirky characters in their lives, like Fayruj, Tangir, and Shoshi, whom are Phaim's singing bandmates. Also, Bob Corn, a singer of desperate loves who loves to accompany the strangest couples with his bizarre and heartfelt notes.

== Cast and characters ==
- Phaim Bhuiyan as Phaim, a second-generation boy born from immigrant parents in Italy. Despite the differences he falls in love with an Italian girl named Asia,
- Carlotta Antonelli as Asia, a rebellious and a bit hipster. She is Phaim's love interest
- Pietro Sermonti as Olmo, he is Asia's father.
- Carolina de Nicolò as Asia's mother
- Rishad Noorani as Shipon, Phaim's father.
- Nasima Akhter as herself, Phaim's mother.
- Sahila Maiuhddin as Navila, Phaim's older sister.
- Nilima Mittal as Sumaya, is Phaim's cousin and roommate.
- Simone Liberati as Matteo, Phaim's Best friend.
- Raja Sethi as Rifat, he is the Imam of the local mosque and another friend of Phaim.
- Martina Gatti as Faith/Fede, is Asia's best friend.
- Tiziano Sgarbi as Bob Corn, a singer.
- Sanjia Haque as Shoshi, is one of Phaim's band member
- Afroza Begum as Phaim's friend's mother who also owns a clothing shop in the neighborhood.
- Fabian Durrani as Fayruj
- Tangir Ahammed Miah as Tangir
- Alessia Giuliani as Carla
- Eva Grieco as Marzia

== Episodes ==
=== Series overview ===
Series	Episodes	Originally released		
Series	Episodes	First released	Last released	Network
1	8	13 April 2022	6 May 2022	RaiPlay

=== Series 1 (2022) ===
No.	Title	Duration	Original release date
1	"No sex" "S1E1"	25 min	13 April 2022
2	"Ti presento i miei " "S1E2"	27 min	unknown
3	"Il rasoio di Occam" "S1E3"	25 min	unknown
4	"Baci con moderazione" "S1E4"	29 min	unknown
5	"Love Turns Around Drunk Version" "S1E5"	28 min	unknown
6	"Le trasmissioni sono momentaneamente sospese" "S1E6"	25 min	unknown
7	"Mogli e buoi" "S1E7"	28 min	unknown
8	"Love Turns Around Unplugged " "S1E8"	27 min	6 May 2022

== Production ==
The series was primarily shot in Tor Pignattara, exactly like the film it's based on call Bangla. The series is an ironic and multi-ethnic portrait of Italy, seen through the eyes of the new generation of immigrants born and raised in Italy. The series released on 13 April 2022, on RaiPlay and later streamed on Rai3 on 27 April. After the success achieved in streaming, Bangla-La serie arrived in Netflix on 20 July 2022.

== Reception ==
=== Accolades ===
Year	Award	Category	Nominee	Result	Ref.
2022	Premi Flaiano	Best Male Performance in the Youth Section	Phaim Bhuiyan	Won	
2022	Nastro d'argento	Miglior Serie Commedia	Bangla-La serie	Won	
2022	Terni Film Festival	Miglior serie televisiva	Bangla - La serie	Won	
2022	Diversify TV Awards	Representation of Race and Ethnicity – Scripted	Bangla-La serie	Nominated	

== See also ==
- Bangla (film)
- List of Italian television series
