= An Endless Sunday =

2023 drama film

- Directed by: Alain Parroni
- Written by: Alain Parroni; Giulio Pennacchi; Beatrice Puccilli
- Produced by: Domenico Procacci; Laura Paolucci; Giorgio Gucci; Fabrizio Moretti; Wim Wenders
- Starring: Enrico Bassetti; Zackari Delmas; Federica Valentini; Lars Rudolph
- Cinematography: Andrea Benjamin Manenti
- Edited by: Riccardo Giannetti
- Music by: Shirō Sagisu
- Production companies: Fandango; Alcor; Rai Cinema; Art Me Pictures; Road Movies
- Distributed by: Fandango
- Release dates: 1 September 2023 (Venice); 14 September 2023 (Italy)
- Running time: 110 minutes
- Countries: Italy; Ireland; Germany
- Language: Italian

An Endless Sunday (Italian: Una sterminata domenica) is a 2023 Italian-Irish-German drama film co-written and directed by Alain Parroni, at his feature film debut. It won the Orizzonti Special Jury Prize at the 80th edition of the Venice Film Festival.

== Cast ==
- Enrico Bassetti as Alex
- Zackari Delmas as Kevin
- Federica Valentini as Brenda
- Lars Rudolph as Domenico

== Production ==
In 2016, Perroni conceived the main plot, the title and the characters' names of the film. In 2017, he started conducting interviews with a group of teenagers (including Federica Valentini, who was later cast as Brenda) about their personal experiences; he continued to interview the same group over the following years, and the material collected from their accounts was eventually incorporated into the film's script. The film was produced by Fandango, Alcor, Art Me Pictures and Road Movies Filmproduktion, in collaboration with Rai Cinema; Wim Wenders served as a co-producer.

== Release ==
The film premiered in the Orizzonti section at the 80th Venice International Film Festival, in which it was awarded the Fipresci Award and the Special Jury Prize. It is also set to be screened at the 48th Toronto International Film Festival and at the 28th Busan International Film Festival. The film was released in Italy on 14 September 2023 by Fandango.
