= Drifters (2011 film) =

- Directed by: Matteo Rovere
- Written by: Matteo Rovere; Laura Paolucci; Francesco Piccolo
- Based on: Gli sfiorati by Sandro Veronesi
- Produced by: Domenico Procacci
- Cinematography: Vladan Radovic
- Edited by: Giogiò Franchini
- Music by: Andrea Farri
- Production company: Fandango
- Release dates: 26 October 2011 (London Film Festival); 2 March 2012 (Italy)
- Running time: 111 minutes

Drifters (Italian: Gli sfiorati) is a 2011 Italian drama film directed by Matteo Rovere. It is based on the 1990 novel Gli sfiorati by Sandro Veronesi.

== Plot ==
For the young Méte, a graphologist fascinated by the psychology hidden behind writing, it's an embarrassing and difficult situation having to take care of his half-sister Belinda, a seventeen-year-old teenager in the balance between everything and nothing, during the second marriage of Méte's father (the only thing the two have in common). To avoid the situation, Méte pretends to be mostly busy with Damiano, a womanizer friend, and Bruno, colleague and separated father. But Méte must eventually face his half-sister, a subject hitherto only grazed.

== Cast ==
- Andrea Bosca as Méte
- Miriam Giovanelli as Belinda
- Claudio Santamaria as Bruno
- Michele Riondino as Damiano
- Massimo Popolizio as Sergio
- Aitana Sánchez-Gijón as Virna
- Asia Argento as Beatrice

== See also ==
- List of Italian films of 2011
- Genetic sexual attraction
