= The Room of the Scirocco =

- Directed by: Maurizio Sciarra
- Written by: Suso Cecchi d'Amico; Salvatore Marcarelli; Maurizio Sciarra
- Produced by: Domenico Procacci
- Starring: Giancarlo Giannini
- Cinematography: Arnaldo Catinari
- Edited by: Cecilia Zanuso
- Music by: Eugenio Bennato
- Production company: Fandango
- Distributed by: Warner Bros. Italia
- Release date: 24 April 1998
- Country: Italy
- Language: Italian

The Room of the Scirocco (Italian: La stanza dello scirocco) is a 1998 Italian romantic comedy film written and directed by Maurizio Sciarra. It is based on the novel with the same name by Domenico Campana. The film won two Nastro d'Argento Awards, for best actor (Giancarlo Giannini) and for best score.

== Plot ==
An elderly marquis, persecuted by fascism, returns to his homeland to be able to sell a property. On his arrival in the fire of his building his butler dies. In order not to suffer the persecutions, the Marquis of Acquafurata decides to take his place in order to carry out his plan undisturbed. The Fascist Party would like to appropriate the building. But instead the Marquis, thanks to the notary Spatafora, finds a false will in which the palace is given to the poorest couple in the country.

Two young spouses, Vincenzo Labate and his wife Rosalia, take possession of the building. The beauty and reluctance of the young woman make the elderly Marquis fall in love, who after her husband's departure confesses his love to Rosalia. The house has a sirocco room in the basement, over which a legend hovers. Built by Arab architects, it is said that by shouting three times inside, the whole building will collapse, leaving no escape for the enemies. The crazy love between the two is consumed in the room, until her parents, who have smelled their daughter's feelings for the Marquis, force her to leave the palace to return to their home. The Marquis chases her, tells her that he will wait for her in the sirocco room, and from there he will take her with him to Paris, after having mocked her fascist pursuers. But the wait is in vain. The Marquis, in a delirium, seems to hear the voice of the young woman, his love screams at her three times, and the palace collapses on him. Disillusioned by now, the man goes to escape, a motorboat awaits him at the sea that will take him to safety. But right there he will find Rosalia, and together they will flee to freedom.

== Cast ==
- Giancarlo Giannini as Marquis of Acquafurata
- Tiziana Lodato as Rosalia
- Paolo De Vita as Spatafora
- Francesco Benigno as Vincenzo Labate
- Tony Sperandeo as Sollima
- Valentina Biasio as Maria
- Lucia Sardo as Lucia

== See also ==
- List of Italian films of 1998
