= The Predators (film) =

- Film poster
- Italian: I predatori
- Directed by: Pietro Castellitto
- Written by: Pietro Castellitto
- Produced by: Domenico Procacci; Laura Paolucci
- Starring: Massimo Popolizio; Manuela Mandracchia; Giorgio Montanini; Pietro Castellitto; Dario Cassini; Anita Caprioli; Marzia Ubaldi; Antonio Gerardi
- Cinematography: Carlo Rinaldi
- Production companies: Rai Cinema; Fandango
- Distributed by: 01 Distribution
- Release date: 22 October 2020
- Running time: 109 minutes
- Country: Italy
- Language: Italian

The Predators (Italian: I predatori) is a 2020 Italian comedy-drama film written and directed by Pietro Castellitto in his directorial debut.

The film was presented at the Horizons section of the 77th Venice International Film Festival, where it received the Best Screenplay Award.

== Plot ==
One day in Ostia, a charismatic watch seller manages to cheat the elderly Ines Vismara by selling her a faulty watch for 1,000 euros. This incident enrages Claudio, Ines' son, a fascist proprietor of a gun shop, and destabilizes Ines to the point that she is run over by a van while crossing the street.

Ines is saved and brought to the hospital by Dr. Pierpaolo Pavone, the head of an intellectual radical chic family. Pierpaolo's wife, Laura, is an uncompromising film director, and their 25-year-old son, Federico, is a scholar passionate about Friedrich Nietzsche. Federico becomes upset when his professor, Nicola, informs him that he cannot join him in exhuming Nietzsche's body. Pierpaolo is having an affair with Gaia, the young girlfriend of Bruno Parise, a colleague who enjoys playing pranks on him.

One day, Federico manages to purchase a bomb from Claudio to destroy Nietzsche's grave. Federico completes his mission despite being injured during the explosion. Flavio, Claudio's uncle, informs him that after being arrested, Federico will reveal where he acquired the bomb. Because Federico is the son of a medic and a director, he won't be sent to jail. However, if the police discover Claudio's guns, Claudio will surely be imprisoned. Consequently, Flavio orders Claudio to kill Federico.

When Claudio confronts Federico, he discovers that Federico is the son of Pierpaolo, the medic who saved his mother's life, and aborts the mission. When Flavio demands an explanation, Claudio brings his 12-year-old gun-loving son, Cesare, to the meeting. Cesare shoots and kills Flavio with a shotgun. Claudio is arrested but retains his parental rights.

A few months later, Bruno dies from brain cancer, which Pierpaolo had diagnosed. Gaia manages to find a new boyfriend in the very watch seller who triggered the entire series of events.

== Cast ==
- Massimo Popolizio as Pierpaolo Pavone
- Manuela Mandracchia as Ludovica Pensa
- Pietro Castellitto as Federico Pavone
- Giorgio Montanini as Claudio Vismara
- Dario Cassini as Bruno Parise
- Anita Caprioli as Gaia
- Marzia Ubaldi as Ines
- Giulia Petrini as Teresa
- Liliana Fiorelli as Paola
- Claudio Camilli as Carlo Vismara
- Orsetta De Rossi as Vittoria
- Rosalina Neri as grandma Ornella
- Renato Marchetti as Saverio
- Maria Castellitto as Marie
- Nando Paone as Nicola Fiorillo
- Antonio Gerardi as Flavio Vismara
- Vinicio Marchioni as a watch seller
- Francesco Borgese as Cesare Vismara
- Nicola Ciccariello as Tullio
- Paolo Fosso as Stefano
- Maria Giulia De Santis as Anna
- Alessandro La Ginestra as Valerio
- Giancarlo Porcacchia as Renato
- Emanuele Linfatti as Jacopo

== Accolades ==
- 77th Venice International Film Festival (2020)
  - Horizons Award for Best Screenplay
- David di Donatello Awards (2021)
  - David di Donatello for Best New Director to Pietro Castellitto
  - Nomination for David di Donatello for Best Original Screenplay to Pietro Castellitto
  - Nomination for David di Donatello for Best Producer to Domenico Procacci and Laura Paolucci
  - Nomination for David di Donatello for Best Score to Niccolò Contessa
