= Sun, Heart, Love =

2016 film

- Directed by: Daniele Vicari
- Screenplay by: Daniele Vicari
- Produced by: Domenico Procacci
- Starring: Isabella Ragonese; Eva Grieco; Francesco Montanari; Francesco Acquaroli
- Cinematography: Gherardo Gossi
- Edited by: Benni Atria; Alberto Masi
- Music by: Stefano Di Battista
- Distributed by: Koch Media
- Release date: 2016
- Language: Italian

Sun, Heart, Love (Italian: Sole cuore amore) is a 2016 Italian drama film written and directed by Daniele Vicari and starring Isabella Ragonese.

== Cast ==
- Isabella Ragonese as Eli
- Eva Grieco as Vale
- Francesco Montanari as Mario
- Francesco Acquaroli as Nicola
- Giulia Anchisi as Bianca
- Noemi Abbrescia as Ada
- Chiara Scalise as Malika
- Paola Tiziana Cruciani as Adele
- Giordano De Plano as Sergio
- Teresa Piergentili as Gemma

== Production ==
The film was produced by Fandango with Rai Cinema. Principal photography started in November 2015 in Rome. The original title of the film comes from the refrain of the Valeria Rossi's hit song "Tre parole".

== Release ==
The film premiered at the 11th Rome Film Festival. It was released on Italian cinemas on 4 May 2017.

== Reception ==
For her performance Isabella Ragonese was nominated for best actress both at Nastro d'Argento and David di Donatello Awards. The film also received Nastro d'Argento nominations for best score and best sound, and a Globo d'oro nomination for best score.
