= Domenico Procacci =

Italian film producer (born 1960)

Domenico Procacci (born 8 February 1960) is an Italian film producer.

== Life and career ==
Born in Bari, Procacci debuted as a producer in the late 1980s, when he co-founded with Renzo Rossellini and others the production company Vertigo. In 1990 he founded the company Fandango, which debuted with a box office hit, Sergio Rubini's La stazione. He soon specialized in producing small-budget art films directed by young directors. In 1992, he started a long collaboration with Rolf de Heer, producing and even distributing his films in Italy, and in 2002 he co-founded with de Heer, Richard Lowenstein, Sue Murray and Bryce Menzies the production company Fandango Australia.

Procacci won four David di Donatello Awards for best producer, and four Silver Ribbons in the same category.

In 2014, Procacci had a son with Kasia Smutniak, whom he married in September 2019.

== Selected filmography ==
- 1990 - The Station
- 1992 - Flight of the Innocent
- 1993 - Bad Boy Bubby
- 1993 - The Blonde
- 1994 - Like Two Crocodiles
- 1994 - The Life and Extraordinary Adventures of Private Ivan Chonkin
- 1996 - Bits and Pieces
- 1996 - The Quiet Room
- 1997 - The Grey Zone
- 1998 - Radiofreccia
- 1998 - Dance Me to My Song
- 1998 - Ecco fatto
- 1998 - The Ice Rink
- 1998 - The Room of the Scirocco
- 1999 - But Forever in My Mind
- 2000 - Johnny the Partisan
- 2001 - The Monkey's Mask
- 2001 - The Last Kiss
- 2001 - Dark Blue World
- 2001 - Dust
- 2001 - He Died with a Felafel in His Hand
- 2002 - The Tracker
- 2002 - The Embalmer
- 2002 - Respiro
- 2002 - Maximum Velocity (V-Max)
- 2003 - Remember Me, My Love
- 2003 - Alexandra's Project
- 2003 - Secret File
- 2003 - Break Free
- 2004 - First Love
- 2004 - The Consequences of Love
- 2004 - Working Slowly (Radio Alice)
- 2005 - Tickets
- 2005 - Mario's War
- 2006 - Our Land
- 2006 - Ten Canoes
- 2006 - The Family Friend
- 2007 - Dr. Plonk
- 2007 - Silk
- 2007 - The Right Distance
- 2007 - Don't Waste Your Time, Johnny!
- 2008 - Quiet Chaos
- 2008 - The Past Is a Foreign Land
- 2008 - Seven Pounds
- 2008 - Gomorrah
- 2008 - Un giorno perfetto
- 2009 - The White Space
- 2009 - Cosmonaut
- 2010 - Kiss Me Again
- 2010 - Loose Cannons
- 2010 - Barney's Version
- 2010 - La passione
- 2011 - Qualunquemente
- 2011 - The Perfect Life
- 2011 - The Forgiveness of Blood
- 2011 - We Have a Pope
- 2011 - The Last Man on Earth
- 2011 - Drifters
- 2012 - Diaz – Don't Clean Up This Blood
- 2012 - Magnificent Presence
- 2012 - Reality
- 2013 - Tutti contro tutti
- 2013 - The Fifth Wheel
- 2014 - A Woman as a Friend
- 2014 - I Can Quit Whenever I Want
- 2015 - Mia Madre
- 2016 - Era d'estate
- 2016 - Sun, Heart, Love
- 2017 - Stories of Love That Cannot Belong to This World
- 2018 - The Happiest Man in the World
- 2019 - Bangla il film
- 2020 - The Predators
- 2021 - Three Floors
- 2022 - Bangla - La serie
- 2022 - The Hummingbird
- 2023 - A Brighter Tomorrow
- 2023 - An Endless Sunday
- 2024 - The Story of Frank and Nina
- 2025 - The Holy Boy
