= Bangla (2019 film) =

2019 film

- Film poster
- Directed by: Phaim Bhuiyan
- Written by: Phaim Bhuiyan; Vanessa Picciarelli
- Produced by: Domenico Procacci; Annamaria Morelli
- Starring: Phaim Bhuiyan; Carlotta Antonelli; Simone Liberati; Pietro Sermonti; Shaila Mohiuddi; Nasima Akhter; Rishad Noorani
- Cinematography: Simone D'Onofrio
- Edited by: Roberto Di Tanna
- Music by: Dario Lanzellotti
- Production companies: Fandango; TimVision Production
- Distributed by: Fandango
- Release date: 26 January 2019 (IFFR)
- Running time: 87 minutes
- Country: Italy
- Language: Italian
- Box office: $291 thousand (worldwide)

Bangla is a 2019 Italian film directed by Phaim Bhuiyan. The film premiered at the 2019 International Film Festival Rotterdam.

The film won the David di Donatello for Best Directorial Debut. In 13 April 2022, Bangla - La serie was released on RaiPlay, produced by Fandango and Rai Fiction as a sequel of the film.

== Awards and nominations ==
Year	Award	Category	Result	Ref.
2019	Hamburg International Film Festival	Best Production	Nominated	
2019	Italian Film Festival	Audience Award	Won	
2019	International Film Festival Rotterdam	Big Screen Award	Nominated	
2019	Nastro d'argento	Best Comedy	Won	
2019	Globo d'oro	Best First Feature	Won	
2020	Festival del Cinema Europeo	Mario Verdone Award	Won	
2020	David di Donatello	Best Directorial Debut	Won	
	David di Donatello	Best Original Screenplay	Nominated	
