= Tor Tre Teste =

Urban zone of Rome, Italy

Coordinates: 41°53′37″N 12°35′55″E

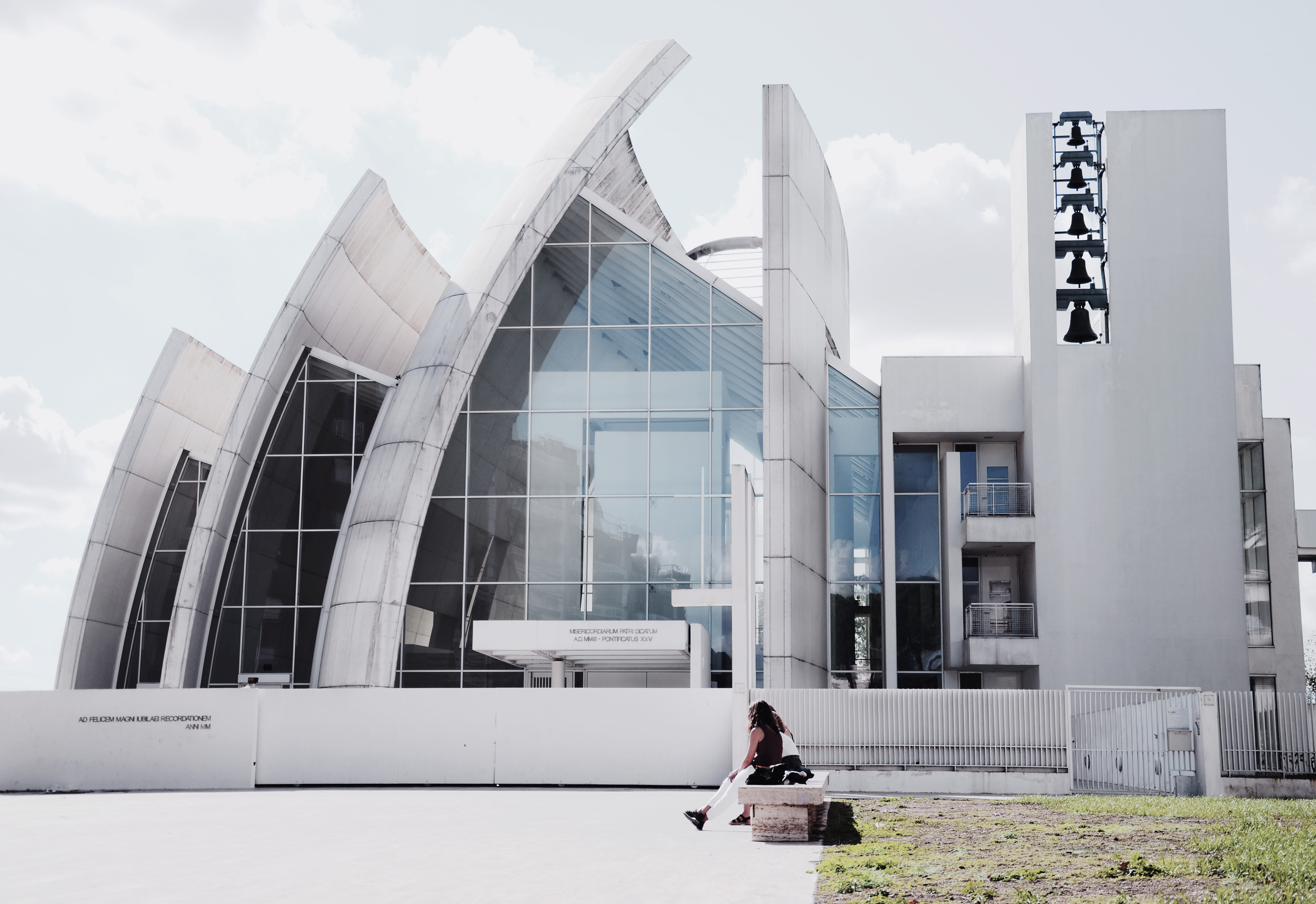
The Jubilee Church

Tor Tre Teste is a district of Rome, Italy, outside the Aurelian Walls. It is located in Municipio V along Via Praenestina. It has a population of 12,176.

The area was part of the Roman countryside until the middle of the 20th century. Tor Tre Teste means "three heads' tower" and was named after a Roman funerary relief. One of the deceased is a veiled woman. The relief was walled into a tower built in the 12th century and belonging to the Lateran Basilica. Later the tower was incorporated into a small church.

This part of the Roman Campagna was built up rapidly in the second half of the 20th century. Important Roman archaeological remains were destroyed during the process. The modern district is mainly suburban sprawl, a blend of undistinguished housing developments and industrial estates.

== Notable places ==
- Jubilee Church or chiesa di Dio Padre Misericordioso by Richard Meier was built in 2003 for the Great Jubilee of the Roman Catholic Church. The church features three large curved walls of pre-cast concrete. The project plays a part in the revitalization of the run-down area.
- The ruins of the medieval tower are standing in a military precinct near Via Praenestina together with the small derelict 17th-century church. A copy of the Roman relief, after which the whole district was named, is attached to the wall.
