= Daniele Vicari =

Italian director, screenwriter and producer

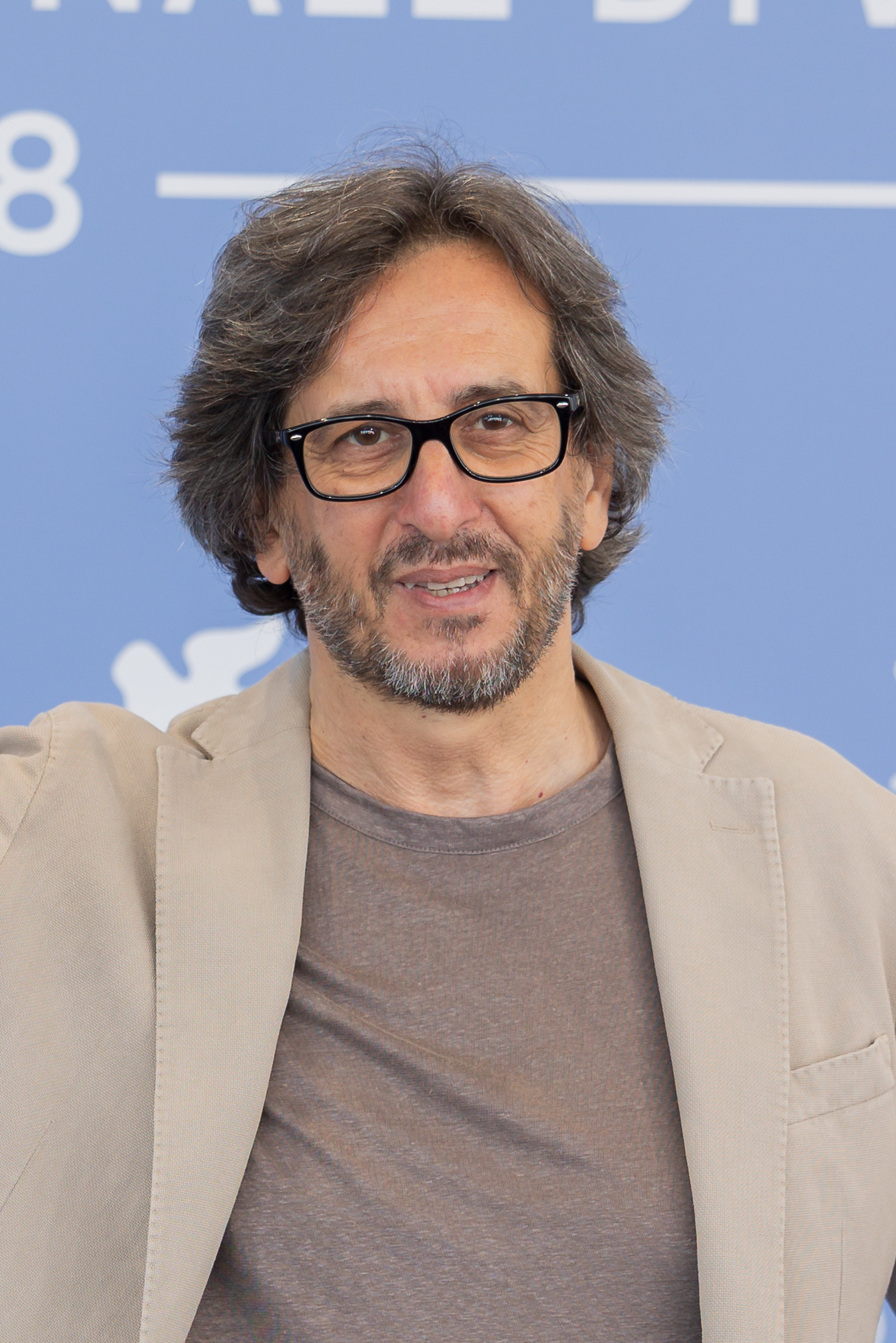
- Vicari in 2025
- Born: 26 February 1967 (age 59); Collegiove, Italy
- Occupations: Director; Screenwriter

Daniele Vicari (born 26 February 1967) is an Italian director, screenwriter and producer.

== Life and career ==
Born in Collegiove, Province of Rieti, Vicari graduated from Rome's University La Sapienza in History and Critics of Cinema under Guido Aristarco. He worked as a film critic for the magazines Cinema Nuovo (1990-1996) and Cinema 60 (1997-1999). During this period he filmed his first shorts.

After shooting several documentary films, in 2002 Vicari made his feature film debut with the drama Maximum Velocity (V-Max), which was entered into the competition at the 59th edition of the Venice International Film Festival and got him a David di Donatello for best new director. His 2006 film My Country won a David di Donatello for best documentary film.

In 2008 he directed Il passato è una terra straniera, based on the novel by Gianrico Carofiglio and was awarded with Grand Jury Prize at the Miami International Film Festival.

In 2012 his film Diaz - Don't Clean Up This Blood depicting the police violence during 2011 G8 in Genoa won four David di Donatello Awards.

His later works include the crime series The Alligator (2020), Orlando (2022), starring Michele Placido, Fela, My Living God (2023), a documentary on the life of the Nigerian musician and political activist Fela Kuti and Tired of Killing - Autobiography of an Assassin (2025).

His next film Bianco, which will be released in theaters in 2027, is a feature film about one of Italy's best known mountaineers, Walter Bonatti.

== Filmography ==
=== Feature Films ===
- Maximum Velocity (V-Max) (2002)
- The Horizon of Events (2005)
- The Past Is a Foreign Land (2006)
- Diaz – Don't Clean Up This Blood (2012)
- Sun, Heart, Love (2016)
- Orlando (2022)
- Il giorno e la notte (2021)
- Tired of Killing: Autobiography of an Assassin (2025)
- Bianco (2027)

=== Documentaries ===
- Partigiani (1997)
- Uomini e lupi (1998)
- Comunisti (1998)
- Bajaram (1998)
- Sesso, marmitte e videogames (1999)
- Non mi basta mai (1999)
- Morto che parla (2000)
- My Country (2006)
- My Country 2.0 (2007)
- Foschia, pesci , Africa, sonno, nausea, fantasia (2010)
- Anija. The Ship (2012)
- Uno, nessuno (2015)
- Safari Njema (2021)
- Fela, My Living God (2023)

=== Short films and television ===
- Il nuovo (1993)
- Mari del Sud (1996)
- Prima che la notte (2018)
- The Alligator (2020)
- Aria (2020)
- Straniero RMX (2024)

=== Video clips ===
- Mai più io sarò saggio - 99 Posse (2012)
- Chitarra nera - Vasco Brondi (2021)
