= Municipio V =

Municipio V di Roma
- Municipio of Rome
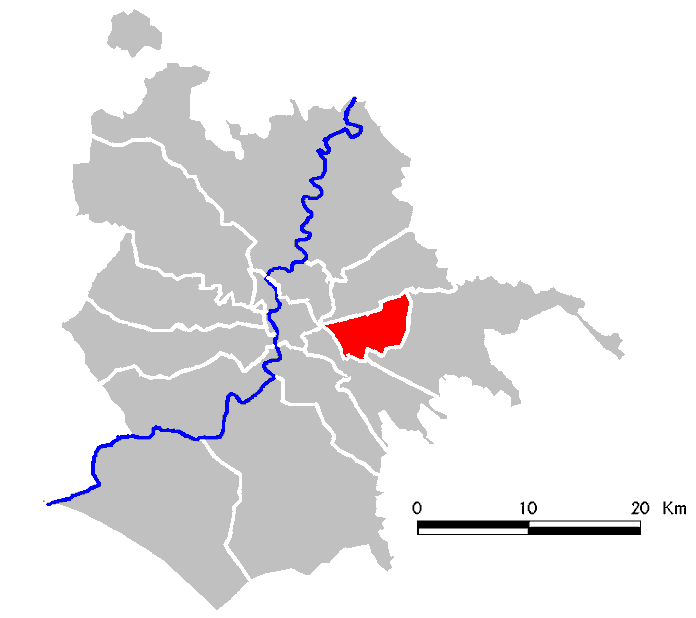
- Location of Municipio V of Rome
- Country: Italy
- Region: Lazio
- Comune: Rome

Government
  - President: Mauro Caliste (PD)

Population (2016)
  - Total: 247,302
- Time zone: UTC+1 (CET)
  - Summer (DST): UTC+2 (CEST)

Municipio V (or Municipality 5) is one of the 15 administrative subdivisions of the city of Rome in Italy. It is in the eastern part of the capital.

== Urban subdivision ==
- 6A Tor Pignattara
- 6B Casilino
- 6C Quadraro
- 6D Gordiani
- 7A Centocelle
- 7B Alessandrina
- 7C Tor Sapienza
- 7D La Rustica
- 7E Tor Tre Teste
- 7F Casetta Mistica
- 7G Centro Direzionale Centocelle
- 7H Omo
