= Like Two Crocodiles =

1994 film

Like Two Crocodiles (Come due coccodrilli)
- Directed by: Giacomo Campiotti
- Written by: Aleksandr Adabashyan; Giacomo Campiotti; Marco Piatti
- Produced by: Domenico Procacci
- Starring: Fabrizio Bentivoglio; Giancarlo Giannini; Valeria Golino
- Cinematography: Raffaele Mertes
- Edited by: Roberto Missiroli
- Music by: Stefano Caprioli
- Production companies: Fandango (Italy); K'ien Productions (France)
- Release date: 19 July 1995 (France)
- Running time: 100 min.
- Country: Italy / France / UK
- Language: Italian

Like Two Crocodiles (Italian: Come due coccodrilli) is a 1994 Italian-French drama film directed and co-written by Giacomo Campiotti.

== Plot ==
A successful art dealer, the bastard son of an Italian aristocrat, returns to his family home to avenge himself against his evil stepbrothers.

== Cast ==
- Fabrizio Bentivoglio as Gabriele
- Giancarlo Giannini as Pietro
- Valeria Golino as Marta
- Sandrine Dumas as Claire
- Ignazio Oliva as Gabriele Giovane
- Angela Baraldi as Antonella

== Awards and nominations ==
- David di Donatello Awards (Italy)
  - Won: Best Supporting Actor (Giancarlo Giannini)
- Golden Globe Awards (USA)
  - Nominated: Best Foreign Language Film
- Locarno Film Festival (Switzerland)
  - Nominated: Golden Leopard (Giacomo Campiotti)
