= The Grey Zone (1997 film) =

1997 Italian film by Franco Bernini

- Directed by: Franco Bernini
- Produced by: Domenico Procacci
- Starring: Francesca Neri
- Cinematography: Paolo Carnera
- Music by: Dario Lucantoni
- Production companies: Fandango; ACHAB Film
- Release date: 14 March 1997
- Running time: 95 minutes
- Language: Italian

The Grey Zone (Italian: Le mani forti) is a 1997 Italian drama film written and directed by Franco Bernini. It entered into the competition at the International Critics' Week of the 50th Cannes Film Festival. The film won the Grolla d'oro for best screenplay.

== Cast ==
- Claudio Amendola: Dario Campisi
- Francesca Neri: Claudia
- Enzo De Caro: Giulio
- Toni Bertorelli: Judge Consoli
- Barbara Cupisti: Teresa
- Massimo De Francovich: Prof. Sembriani
- Teresa Saponangelo: Patient
