= Radiofreccia =

1998 Italian film by Luciano Ligabue

- Directed by: Luciano Ligabue
- Written by: Antonio Leotti; Luciano Ligabue
- Story by: Luciano Ligabue
- Produced by: Domenico Procacci
- Starring: Stefano Accorsi; Luciano Federico; Alessio Modica; Enrico Salimbeni; Roberto Zibetti; Francesco Guccini
- Cinematography: Arnaldo Catinari
- Music by: Luciano Ligabue
- Production company: Fandango
- Distributed by: Medusa Film
- Release date: 1998
- Running time: 112 minutes
- Country: Italy
- Language: Italian

Radiofreccia, released in 1998, is the first movie directed by Italian rock singer-songwriter Luciano Ligabue, based on his 1997 debut novel Fuori e dentro il Borgo.

It features the singer-songwriter Francesco Guccini (with whom Ligabue also collaborated for a song) in a small role.

== Cast ==
- Stefano Accorsi as Freccia
- Luciano Federico as Bruno
- Cosima Coccheri as Ragazza eroinomane
- Paolo Cremonini as Omero
- Fulvio Farnetti as Virus
- Ottorino Ferrari as Pluto
- Serena Grandi as Madre di Freccia
- Francesco Guccini as Adolfo
