= The Station (1990 film) =

- Directed by: Sergio Rubini
- Written by: Umberto Marino; Sergio Rubini; Filippo Ascione
- Produced by: Domenico Procacci
- Starring: Sergio Rubini; Margherita Buy
- Cinematography: Alessio Gelsini Torresi
- Edited by: Angelo Nicolini
- Music by: Antonio Di Pofi
- Release date: 1990
- Language: Italian

La stazione, internationally released as The Station, is a 1990 Italian comedy-drama film directed by Sergio Rubini.

For this film Rubini won a David di Donatello for Best New Director and Margherita Buy was awarded with a David di Donatello for Best Actress.

== Cast ==
- Sergio Rubini as Domenico
- Margherita Buy as Flavia
- Ennio Fantastichini as Danilo
- Emilio Solfrizzi

== See also ==
- List of Italian films of 1990
