= Secret File =

- Directed by: Paolo Benvenuti
- Written by: Paola Baroni; Paolo Benvenuti; Mario Cereghino
- Produced by: Domenico Procacci
- Cinematography: Gianni Marras
- Edited by: César Meneghetti
- Release date: 2003
- Country: Italy
- Language: Italian

Secret File (Italian: Segreti di Stato) is a 2003 Italian historical drama film written and directed by Paolo Benvenuti.

It depicts a fictional investigation about the Portella della Ginestra massacre. It was entered into the main competition at the 60th Venice International Film Festival.

== Cast ==
- David Coco as Gaspare Pisciotta
- Antonio Catania as The Lawyer
- Sergio Graziani as The Professor
- Aldo Puglisi as Perito Settore
- Francesco Guzzo as Cacaova

== See also ==
- List of Italian films of 2003
