= Italian Film Festival =

- Frequency: Annually
- Location(s): Edinburgh, Scotland
- Established: 1993
- Website: italianfilmfestival.org.uk

The Italian Film Festival is a film festival organised by the Italian Institute of Culture and Edinburgh Filmhouse with the collaboration of the Glasgow Film Theatre, DCA Dundee Contemporary Arts, Aberdeen Filmhouse, and Inverness Eden Court.

== Origins and objectives ==
Since 1993, the festival has been held annually except for the 2020 and 2021 editions due to the Coronavirus pandemic and to the temporary closure of the Italian Institute of Culture. It was first envisioned as a celebration of the best Italian productions, including classic and contemporary cinema. The week-long event includes a wide-ranging variety of films, short films, and documentaries released within the twelve months in between festivals. It aims at including the works of new talents as well as of established professionals.

== Events ==
In addition to the screening of movies and documentaries, the Italian Film Festival includes tributes to the most representative and relevant figures in their film industry. Among those who have been celebrated are Ettore Scola in 2017, Luchino Visconti in 2016, and Alida Valli in 2009.

In 2013 seven of the movies from the festival were screened in Belfast. Other previous editions included venues in St. Andrews, Kirkcaldy, and Manchester.

== Organisers ==
- Italian Institute of Culture in Edinburgh (founder)
- Italian Consul General
- Creative Scotland
- Istituto Luce – Cinecittà

== External links section ==
http://italianfilmfestival.org.uk
