= Orchestra di Piazza Vittorio =

Italian orchestra

- Orchestra
- Founded: 2002
- Location: Rome
- Website: orchestrapiazzavittorio.it

Orchestra di Piazza Vittorio is a well-known Italian multi-ethnic orchestra that was created in Rome in 2002. It is also the subject of a 2006 film of the same name.

== History ==
The Orchestra di Piazza Vittorio begins in the Esquilino neighborhood in Rome. The neighbourhood is largely populated by immigrants and revolves around a square that is a hub for various cultures, sounds and musicians from all corners of the world: Piazza Vittorio Emanuele II, also known as Piazza Vittorio. This Piazza inspired musician Mario Tronco, of the Piccola Orchestra Avion Travel, and filmmaker Agostino Ferrente to reunite some of these performers, each one unique in origin, instrument, and musical experience, in an orchestra that plays and reinvents music from all over the world with an energy that audiences take away with them after each concert.

The project was carried out through Apollo 11, a community organization founded in 2001 by Tronco, Ferrente, and other artists and volunteers with the goal of rescuing the Apollo, a vintage movie theater, from being turned into a bingo hall.

The documentary L'Orchestra di Piazza Vittorio (2006) by Agostino Ferrente tells the story of this very unusual musical ensemble. The movie has since been successfully screened at many international festivals, including the Locarno International Film Festival in Switzerland and the Tribeca Film Festival in New York City. In Italy it is distributed by Luckyred, and has won several awards such as the Nastro d'Argento and the Globo D’Oro as best documentary, both in 2007. Netflix is the US distributor of the movie that has also been released in many other countries around the world.

L’Orchestra di Piazza Vittorio has played over 300 concerts in the five continents, often after the screening of Ferrente’s movie, a format referred to as "cineconcerto" (film + concert).

The Orchestra has recorded five albums until now: the first (self-titled) has received the "German Record Critics' Award" in 2005 in the World Music section. The album Il Flauto Magico was co-produced by the legendary Bob Ezrin.

In the summer of 2009, the Orchestra di Piazza Vittorio made a tour in Europe with their rendition of Mozart’s The Magic Flute, which debuted in Lyon.

== Orchestra members ==
- Houcine Ataa (Tunisia) – vocals
- Fausto Bottoni (Italy) – trombone, euphonium
- Peppe D’Argenzio (Italy) – baritone and soprano sax, clarinet
- Evandro Cesar Dos Reis (Brazil) – vocals, classical and electric guitar, cavaquinho
- Sanjay Kansa Banik (India) – tabla
- Awalys Ernesto “El Kiri” López Maturell (Cuba) – drums, congas
- Omar López Valle (Cuba) – trumpet, flugelhorn
- Zsuzsanna Krasznai (Hungary) – cello
- John Maida (United States) – violin
- Gaia Orsoni (Italy) – viola
- Carlos Paz Duque (Ecuador) – vocals, Andean flute
- Pino Pecorelli (Italy) – double bass, electric bass
- Leandro Piccioni (Italy) – piano
- El Hadji “Pap” Yeri Samb (Senegal) – vocals, djembe, dundun, sabar
- Raúl “Cuervo” Scebba (Argentina) – marimba, congas, percussions, timpani
- “Kaw” Dialy Mady Sissoko (Senegal) – vocals, kora
- Ziad Trabelsi (Tunisia) – oud, vocals
- Mario Tronco (Italy) – Fender Rhodes
- with Sylvie Lewis (UK/USA) – vocals, guitar

=== Former members ===
- Eszter Nagypal (Hungary) – cello
- Giuseppe Smaldino (Italy) – french horn
- Mohammed Bilal (India) – harmonium, castanets
- Amrit Hussain (India) – tabla

== Discography ==
- Studio albums:
  - L'Orchestra di Piazza Vittorio (2003)
  - Sona (2006)
  - L'Isola di Legno (2013)
  - Credo (2016)
- Live albums
  - Il Flauto Magico Secondo L'Orchestra di Piazza Vittorio (2010)
