= Don't Waste Your Time, Johnny! =

- Theatrical release poster
- Directed by: Fabrizio Bentivoglio
- Written by: Fabrizio Bentivoglio; Umberto Contarello; Filippo Gravino; Guido Iuculano; Valia Santella
- Produced by: Ivan Fiorini; Domenico Procacci
- Starring: Fabrizio Bentivoglio
- Cinematography: Luca Bigazzi
- Music by: Fausto Mesolella
- Distributed by: Medusa Film
- Release date: 2007
- Country: Italy
- Language: Italian

Don't Waste Your Time, Johnny! (Italian: Lascia perdere, Johnny!) is a 2007 Italian biographical comedy-drama film written and directed by Fabrizio Bentivoglio. It is loosely based on real life events of musician Fausto Mesolella, a member of Piccola Orchestra Avion Travel.

It was nominated for four David di Donatello Awards, including Best New Director.

== Cast ==
- Antimo Merolillo as Fausto "Johnny" Ciaramella
- Fabrizio Bentivoglio as Augusto Riverberi
- Ernesto Mahieux as Raffaele Niro
- Valeria Golino as Annamaria
- Lina Sastri as Vincenza, Johnny's mother
- Peppe Servillo as Gerry Como
- Roberto De Francesco as Autore
- Toni Servillo as Maestro Falasco
- Daria D'Antonio as Franca Marocco
- Ugo Fangareggi as Pietro Tagnin
- Luigi Montini as Discografico

== See also ==
- List of Italian films of 2007
