= Maximum Velocity (V-Max) =

- Directed by: Daniele Vicari
- Written by: Maura Nuccetelli; Laura Paolucci; Daniele Vicari
- Produced by: Domenico Procacci
- Starring: Valerio Mastandrea
- Cinematography: Gherardo Gossi
- Edited by: Marco Spoletini
- Music by: Massimo Zamboni
- Release date: 2002
- Country: Italy
- Language: Italian

Maximum Velocity (V-Max) (Italian: Velocità massima) is a 2002 Italian drama film directed by Daniele Vicari. It entered the competition at the 59th Venice International Film Festival.

For this film Vicari won the 2003 David di Donatello for best new director. The film also won two Nastro d'Argento Awards, for best producer and best editing.

== Cast ==
- Valerio Mastandrea: Stefano
- Cristiano Morroni: Claudio
- Alessia Barela: Giovanna
- Ivano De Matteo: Fischio
- Ennio Girolami: Father of Stefano
- Sara Franchetti: Mother of Stefano
- Isabella Orsini: Actress

== See also ==
- List of Italian films of 2002
