= Tor Pignattara =

District of Rome in Lazio region, Italy

- Comune
- Comune di Tor Pignattara
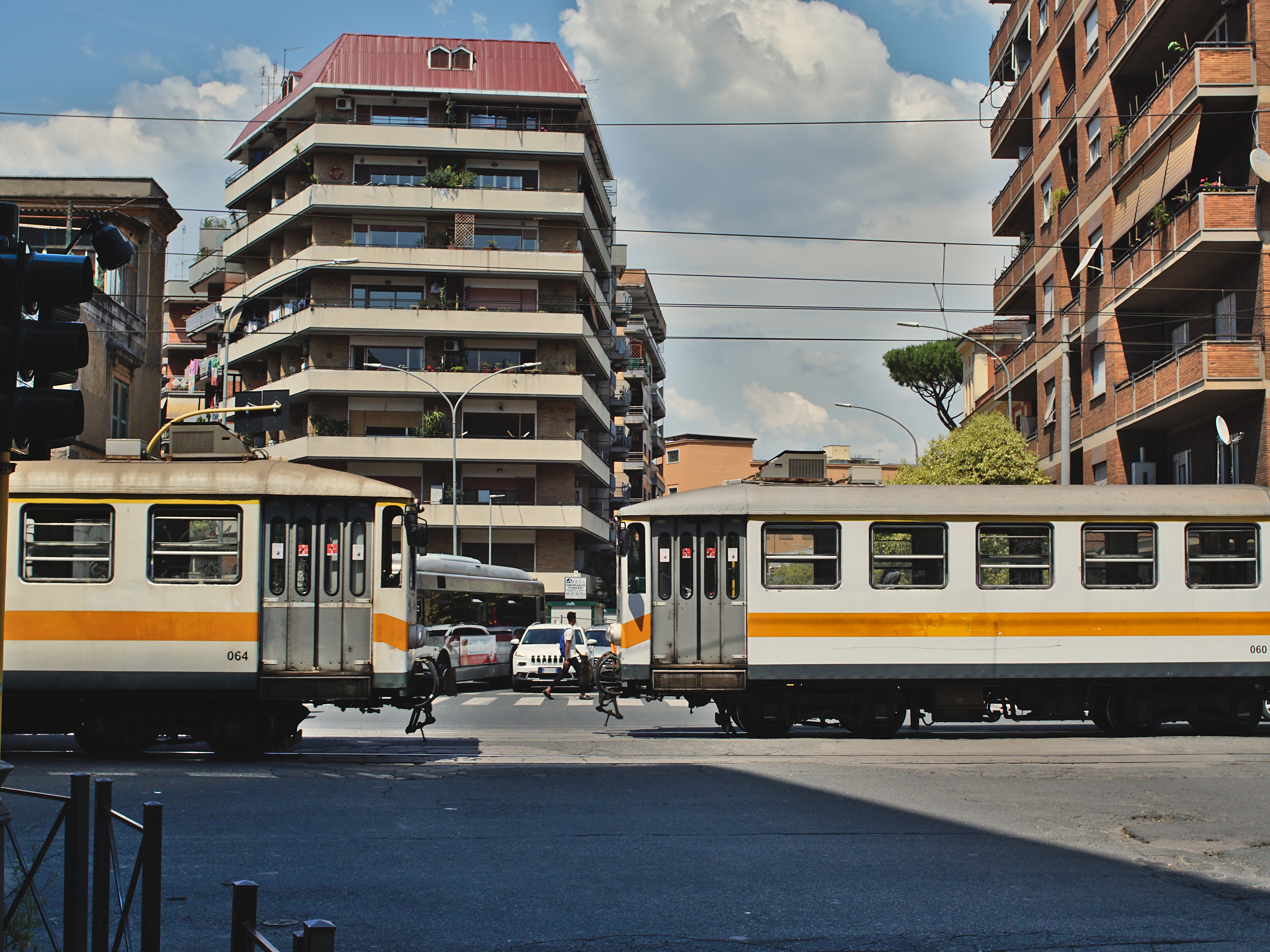
- Tor Pignattara District

- Map of administrative subdivisions of Rome with Tor Pignattara highlighted

- Location within Italy Location within Lazio
- Country: Italy
- Region: Lazio
- Province: Rome
- Founded: 30 luglio 1977
- Time zone: UTC+1 (CET)
  - Summer (DST): UTC+2 (CEST)
- Postal code: 00177
- Dialing code: 06A
- Website: www.italia.it/en/lazio/rome/torpignattara

Tor Pignattara is a district of Rome, Italy. It is located in Municipio V with an area of 2.27 km^{2}. It has a population of 47,029.

The name Tor Pignattara comes from the Mausoleum of Elena, who was the mother of Constantine. Her tomb was located in the area, and parts of it can still be seen today. The mausoleum had a dome, which unfortunately cannot be seen anymore. But in the past, the base of the dome was made up of two circles of clay pots called "pignatte" by the Romans. Over time, these pots became more visible, and people started referring to the place as the "tower of the pots" or "Tor Pignattara".

== See also ==
- Administrative subdivisions of Rome
- Municipio V
