= Flight of the Innocent =

- Theatrical release poster
- Directed by: Carlo Carlei
- Screenplay by: Carlo Carlei; Gualtiero Rosella
- Story by: Carlo Carlei
- Cinematography: Raffaele Mertes
- Edited by: Claudio Di Mauro; Carlo Fontana
- Music by: Carlo Siliotto
- Production companies: Canal+ Rocket Pictures; Fandango; RAI; Cristaldifilm; Fildebroc
- Distributed by: Metro-Goldwyn-Mayer
- Release dates: October 9, 1992 (Italy); October 22, 1993 (United States)
- Running time: 105 minutes
- Country: Italy
- Language: Italian
- Budget: $1.8 million

La corsa dell'innocente (internationally released as Flight of the Innocent) is a 1992 Italian drama film directed by Carlo Carlei. It was nominated at 51st Golden Globe Awards for Best Foreign Language Film.

== Cast ==
- Francesca Neri as Marta Rienzi
- Jacques Perrin as Davide Rienzi
- Manuel Colao as Vito
- Federico Pacifici as Scarface
- Salvatore Borghese as Vito's father
- Lucio Zagaria as Orlando
- Giusi Cataldo as Giovanna
- Massimo Lodolo as Rocco
- Anita Zagaria as Vito's mother
- Nicola Di Pinto as the Police chief
- Gianfranco Barra as Porter
- Beppe Chierici as Don Silvio
- Isabelle Mantero as a policewoman

== Year-end lists ==
- Honorable mention – David Elliott, The San Diego Union-Tribune
