= 5 Is the Perfect Number =

2019 film directed by Igort

- Film poster
- Italian: 5 è il numero perfetto
- Directed by: Igort
- Screenplay by: Igort
- Based on: 5 is the Perfect Number by Igort
- Produced by: Elda Ferri; Marina Alessandra Marzotto; Mattia Oddone
- Starring: Toni Servillo; Valeria Golino; Carlo Buccirosso; Iaia Forte
- Cinematography: Nicolaj Brüel
- Edited by: Esmeralda Calabria; Walter Fasano
- Production company: Rai Cinema
- Distributed by: 01 Distribution
- Release date: 29 August 2019
- Running time: 138 minutes
- Country: Italy
- Language: Neapolitan

5 Is the Perfect Number (Italian: 5 è il numero perfetto) is a 2019 Italian thriller drama film directed by Igort, based on his 2002 homonymous graphic novel, starring Toni Servillo and Valeria Golino.

The film was released in Italy on 29 August 2019 and presented at the Venice Days of the 76th Venice Film Festival.

== Plot ==
In 1970s Naples, the retired camorrist Peppino Lo Cicero decides to return to action after the murder of his son Nino. Imagining that his son's death was caused by a betrayal, Peppino tries to hire four fellow hitmen in order to plan and execute his revenge.

== Cast ==
- Toni Servillo as Peppino Lo Cicero
- Valeria Golino as Rita
- Carlo Buccirosso as Totò o' Macellaio (Totò the Butcher)
- Iaia Forte as Madonna
- Giovanni Ludeno as Il Gobbo (The Hunchback)
- Vincenzo Nemolato as Mister Ics (Mr. X)
- Mimmo Borrelli as Don Guarino
- Gigio Morra as Don Lava
- Emanuele Valenti as Ciro
- Marcello Romolo as Michele

== Reception ==
The film has been described as visually and stylistically appealing, yet not emotionally compelling by The Hollywood Reporter.
