= RaiPlay =

Italian video streaming service

- Logo used since 2023
- Website type: OTT streaming platform
- Available in: Italian
- Country of origin: Italy
- Area served: Italy
- Owner: RAI
- Industry: Entertainment; mass media
- Products: Streaming media; video on demand; digital distribution
- Services: Film production; film distribution; television production; television distribution
- Website: www.raiplay.it
- Commercial: Yes
- Registration: Required
- Launched: 12 September 2016
- Current status: Active

RaiPlay is an Italian subscription video on-demand over-the-top streaming service owned by RAI. The service primarily distributes films and television series produced by RAI.

== History ==
RaiPlay was created on 9 January 2007 as Rai.tv and operated by Rai Net (now Rai).

From 2007 to 2014 many videos have been available on the Rai's YouTube channel, but in 2014 the broadcaster decided not to renew the partnership with the famous web site, removing 150 000 videos in a 9 year period. The economic loss due to this decision has been estimated at €1,5 million.

On 12 September 2016, Rai.tv became RaiPlay, renewing its graphics and functions but not including the live streaming or radio content. RaiPlay has been available on smart TVs since December 2016.

Since 1 June 2017, during the airing of the second season of Non uccidere, all episodes of new seasons belonging to Rai series or purchased from other broadcasters were made available online via RaiPlay Anteprima.
