= Senso (film) =

1954 film by Luchino Visconti

- Film poster by Renato Fratini
- Directed by: Luchino Visconti
- Screenplay by: Suso Cecchi d'Amico; Luchino Visconti; Carlo Alianello; Giorgio Bassani; Giorgio Prosperi; Tennessee Williams; Paul Bowles
- Based on: Senso by Camillo Boito
- Produced by: Domenico Forges Davanzati
- Starring: Alida Valli; Farley Granger; Massimo Girotti
- Cinematography: G. R. Aldo; Robert Krasker
- Edited by: Mario Serandrei
- Music by: Anton Bruckner; Nino Rota (adaptation)
- Distributed by: Lux Film
- Release date: 30 December 1954
- Running time: 117 minutes
- Country: Italy
- Languages: Italian; German

Senso (Italian pronunciation: [ˈsɛnso]) is a 1954 Italian historical melodrama film directed and co-written by Luchino Visconti, based on Camillo Boito's novella of the same name. Set during the Third Italian War of Independence, the film follows the Italian Contessa Livia Serpieri (Alida Valli), who has an affair with the Austrian Lieutenant Franz Mahler (Farley Granger). It was Visconti's first color film.

The word senso is Italian for 'sense', 'feeling', or 'lust'. The title refers to the delight Livia experiences while reflecting on her affair with a handsome lieutenant, in spite of her political convictions.

In 2008, the film was included on the Italian Ministry of Cultural Heritage’s 100 Italian films to be saved, a list of 100 films that "have changed the collective memory of the country between 1942 and 1978."

== Plot ==
The film is set in Italy around 1866, the year the Italian-Austrian war of unification would see the Veneto and most of Friuli-Venezia Giulia united to Italy after the Seven Weeks' War between Austria on one side and Prussia and Italy on the other.

In spring of 1866, a performance of Il Trovatore at La Fenice opera house in Venice is interrupted at the close of Manrico's rousing aria "Di quella pira" by a boisterous protest by Italian Nationalists against the occupying Austrian troops present in the theater. Livia Serpieri, an Italian countess, unhappily married to a stuffy older aristocrat, witnesses this and tries to conceal the fact that her cousin Marchese Roberto Ussoni has organized the protest. During the commotion, she meets a dashing young Austrian Lieutenant named Franz Mahler, and is instantly smitten with him. The two begin a secret love affair. Despite the fact that Franz was responsible for sending Roberto into exile for his radical behavior, Livia vainly pretends not to be aware of it.

Although Franz is obviously using Livia for her money and social status, Livia throws herself into an affair of complete sexual abandon with Franz, giving away her money and not caring what society thinks about her. But soon, Franz begins failing to show up for their trysts and Livia becomes consumed by jealousy and paranoia. The war finally forces the lovers apart, with Livia's husband taking her away to their villa in the country in order to avoid the carnage. Late one night, Franz arrives on the estate and slips into Livia's bedroom. He asks her for more money to bribe the army doctors into keeping him off the battlefield, and Livia complies, giving him all of the money she was holding for Roberto, who intended to supply it to the partisans fighting the Austrians. Livia's betrayal leads to tragic consequences, as the Austrians overwhelm the under-equipped Italians at the Battle of Custoza (1866).

Being separated from Franz almost drives Livia mad, and she rejoices when a letter from him finally arrives. In it, he thanks her for the financial support that helped him stay away from the front, but advises her not to come and see him in Verona yet, as the journey would be too dangerous. She disregards this last bit of advice, however, and, without qualms, abandons her comfortable life to hurry to him as soon as possible. She makes her way to his apartment, which her money has paid for, only to find Franz in the company of a young prostitute called Clara. Now a drunken, self-loathing rogue, he openly mocks Livia for accepting his abuse.

After forcing Livia to sit and drink with the prostitute, Franz throws Livia out of his rooms, and she finds herself in the streets, which are filled with drunken, amorous Austrian soldiers. Her sanity slipping, Livia realizes that she still has Franz's letter, and heads to the headquarters of the Austrian Army, where she hands the letter to a general. Although he can see that Livia is acting out of spite for being cuckolded, the general is forced to act upon the evidence of Franz's treason, and Franz is promptly executed by firing squad. Livia, now insane, runs off into the night, crying out her lover's name.

== Cast ==
- Farley Granger as Lieutenant Franz Mahler
- Alida Valli as Contessa Livia Serpieri
- Massimo Girotti as Marchese Roberto Ussoni
- Heinz Moog as Count Serpieri
- Rina Morelli as Laura, Livia's maid
- Christian Marquand as a Bohemian officer
- Sergio Fantoni as Luca, a Nationalist farmer
- Tino Bianchi as Captain Meucci
- Ernst Nadherny as the Austrian officer in Verona
- Tonio Selwart as Colonel Kleist
- Marcella Mariani as Clara, a prostitute

Uncredited

- Christoph Hartung von Hartungen (Mediziner, 1882) as General Hauptmann
- Marianne Leibl as General Hauptmann's wife
- Jean-Pierre Mocky as a soldier
- Goliarda Sapienza as lead demonstrator at opera house

== Production ==
=== Adaptation ===
Boito's novella is presented as though it is the private diary of Countess Livia (who is not from Venice, as she is in the film, but, rather, from Trento). Sixteen years after the Third Italian War of Independence, she tells of being courted on and off by a lawyer, Gino, whom she constantly rebuffs, and then reminisces about an affair she had in Venice in 1866, and the story switches back and forth between the present and past, with the past comprising the majority of the work. In adapting the novella, Visconti chose not to incorporate the diary aspect and deleted the character of Gino entirely to focus solely on the events that take place during the War.

The film has a greater focus on the War than the novella, and the character of Roberto Ussoni, Livia's nationalist cousin who leads a rebellion against the Austrians, is original to the film. The episode in which Livia gives the money meant for the Italian partisans to her lover, leading to a dramatic massacre, is also not in Boito's story. Visconti strayed so far from the original source material that, at one point, he thought of renaming the film Custoza, after the big battle that is depicted late in the film, but he was unable to for legal reasons.

The character of Remigio Ruz in the novella was renamed Franz Mahler for the film. Visconti changed the name as a tribute to Gustav Mahler, one of his favourite composers, whose music features prominently in his later film Death in Venice (1971). Another musical aspect of the film that was added to the story is the opening, which takes place during an opera (in Boito's novella, the protagonists first meet at a swimming bath).

=== Casting ===
Originally, Visconti had hoped to cast Ingrid Bergman and Marlon Brando in the lead roles. However, at the time, Bergman was married to Italian director Roberto Rossellini, who would not allow her to work for other directors, and Brando was rejected by the producers, who considered Granger to be a bigger star. It has also been said that Brando refused the role after being informed that Bergman was not going to participate in the film. Because Granger did not speak Italian, his dialogue was dubbed by Enrico Maria Salerno in post-production.

In his autobiography, Tab Hunter claimed Visconti considered him to play Mahler, but his agent didn't tell him because he thought foreign films were a waste of time.

Ironically, while Alida Valli portrays an Italian countess at odds with the Austrian Empire, she was descended from Austrian nobility and held the title Freiin von Marckenstein-Frauenberg. Visconti also offered the part to Maria Callas, who declined due to scheduling issues.

=== Costumes and production design ===
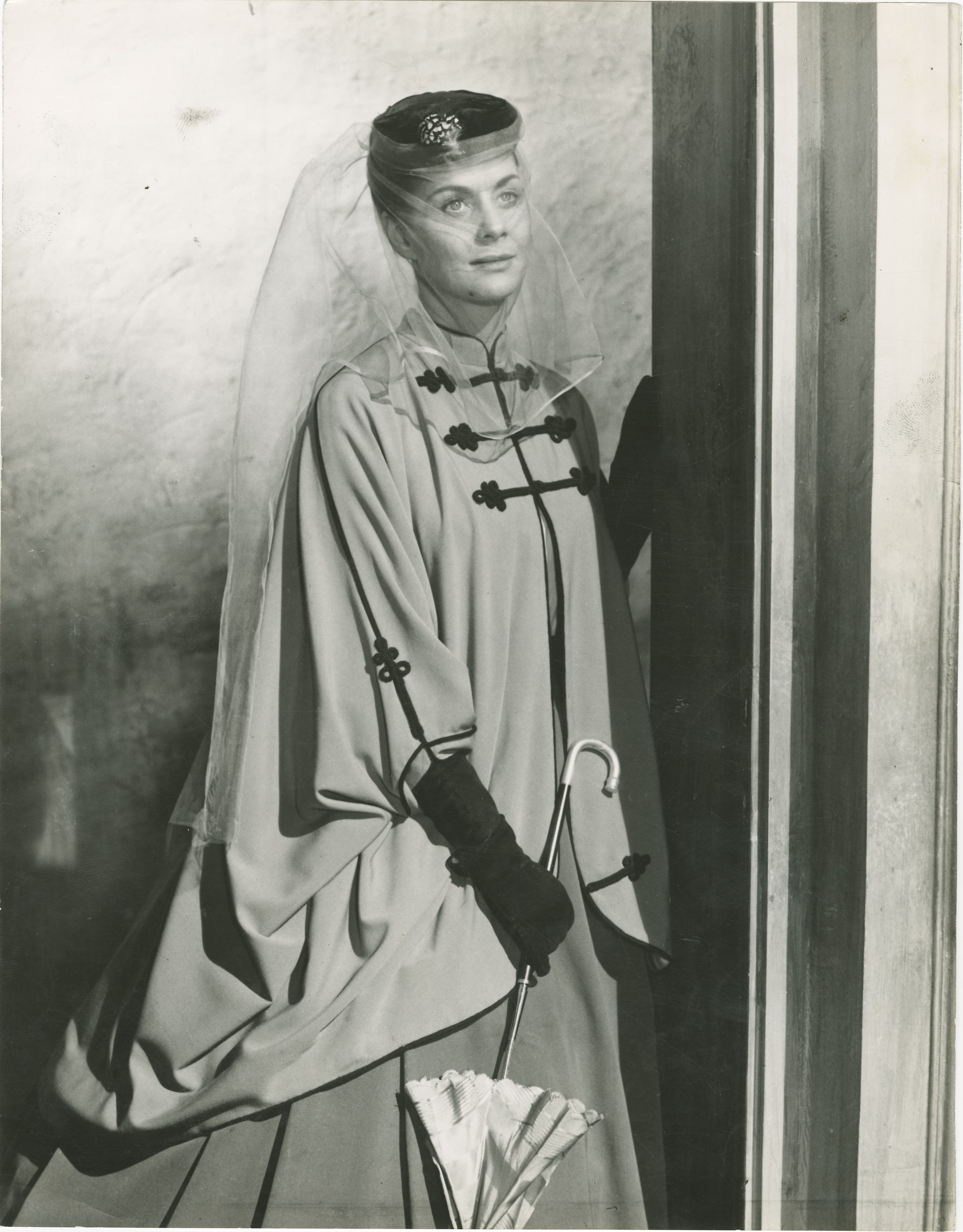
The detailed period costumes and visuals would become Visconti's directorial signature.

The detailed period costumes were recreated with great care after meticulous iconographic research, which would become a signature of Visconti's productions thereafter. Alida Valli's costumes were designed by Marcel Escoffier, Jean Cocteau's regular collaborator, while the remainder of the costumes were designed by Piero Tosi. Fashion writer Anna Battista writes that "[Visconti] wanted [Tosi] to transform main actress Alida Valli into a sophisticated foreigner, almost 'de-Italianising' her: her style and elegance had to be highlighted through what she worn and she had to turn into the focal point of the film." Ottavio Scotti was the production designer.

The overall visual style was inspired by impressionist and Macchiaioli paintings.

=== Filming ===
The film was shot primarily in Venice and Rome, and at the Titanus and Scalera studios. The opening sequence was shot on-location at La Fenice opera house. After La Fenice was destroyed by arson in 1996, stills from the film were used as references for the reconstruction. Other filming locations included Villa Godi, the Venetian Ghetto, the Cannaregio canal, Castel Sant'Angelo, and Valeggio sul Mincio.

Franco Zeffirelli, Francesco Rosi and Jean-Pierre Mocky, who would go on to become accomplished film and theater directors in their own right, worked as Visconti's assistants on the film. G. R. Aldo, the film's original cinematographer, died midway through production, so Robert Krasker was brought in to take his place, but Visconti's and Krasker's visions clashed. When the shoot ran long and Krasker had to leave due to another commitment, camera operator Giuseppe Rotunno stepped in and lensed the remaining scenes, including Mahler's execution. The ending sequence was actually a reshoot, after the original ending was rejected by Italian censors.

Farley Granger had a falling-out with Visconti towards the end of filming and returned to the US. Visconti handled this by using a body double to stand in for Granger's character in the ending sequence. The double was told to keep his hands in front of his face, and was dispatched with his face to the wall.

=== Music ===
Rather than an original score, the film is scored by period music written by Anton Bruckner, primarily excerpts from his "Symphony No. 7." The symphony was adapted by Nino Rota, the first of several collaborations with Visconti, and recorded by the RAI Symphony Orchestra (conducted by Franco Ferrara).

The opening sequence is set to Giuseppe Verdi's Il trovatore, performed by Anita Cerquetti and Gino Penno.

== Alternate versions ==
A truncated English-language version of the film recut to 94 minutes and featuring dialogue written by Tennessee Williams and Paul Bowles was released under the title The Wanton Countess.

A French-language dub was supervised by Visconti's old mentor Jean Renoir.

== Reception ==
For his work on the film, the Italian National Syndicate of Film Journalists awarded G. R. Aldo the Silver Ribbon for Best Cinematography. Visconti was nominated for the Golden Lion at the 15th Venice International Film Festival.

André Bazin wrote that "Visconti seeks to impose upon this magnificent, beautifully composed, almost picturesque setting the rigor and, most importantly, the unobtrusiveness of a documentary."

Roger Ebert gave Senso four out of four stars, and listed it as one of his "Great Movies". Martin Scorsese listed it in his "85 Films You Need To See To Know Anything About Film." On the review aggregator website Rotten Tomatoes, 88% of 24 critics' reviews are positive, with an average rating of 7.8/10.

In 2008, the film was included on the Italian Ministry of Cultural Heritage’s 100 Italian films to be saved, a list of 100 films that "have changed the collective memory of the country between 1942 and 1978."

== Home media ==
A digitally restored version of the film was released on DVD and Blu-ray by The Criterion Collection in February 2011. The release includes The Wanton Countess, the rarely seen English-language version of the film; The Making of "Senso", a new documentary featuring Rotunno, assistant director Rosi, costume designer Piero Tosi, and Caterina D’Amico, daughter of screenwriter Suso Cecchi D’Amico and author of Life and Work of Luchino Visconti; a visual essay by film scholar Peter Cowie; Viva VERDI, a new documentary on Visconti, Senso, and opera; and Man of Three Worlds: Luchino Visconti, a 1966 BBC program exploring Visconti’s mastery of cinema, theater, and opera direction. There is also a booklet featuring an essay by filmmaker and author Mark Rappaport and an excerpt from Granger's autobiography, Include Me Out.

== Senso '45 ==
After reading Boito's novella and finding himself unsatisfied with Visconti's rather liberal adaptation, Tinto Brass re-adapted the work as the 2002 film Senso '45 (retitled Black Angel for the international release), starring Anna Galiena as Livia and Gabriel Garko as her lover. Unlike the 1954 film, Senso '45 does not romanticize Livia's affair, but, rather, depicts it as a clinical study of vanity and lust. This film is much more faithful to the novella than the earlier adaptation in terms of tone and story, but the action was transported from the War of Unification to the end of World War II, with Remigio becoming a Nazi Lieutenant named Helmut Schultz, and Livia updated to being the wife of a high ranking Fascist official. Brass later explained that the change in era was made because he did not want to compete with Visconti's vision of Risorgimento-era Italy. Senso '45 won Italian cinema's Silver Ribbon for Best Costume Design.
