= A Christmas Eve =

Short story by Camillo Boito

"A Christmas Eve" is a short story by Camillo Boito which appeared in his anthology of decadence and perversity titled Tales of Vanity (sometimes translated as Vain Tales), which also featured his more famous work, the novella Senso.

The story deals with a young man who is sexually obsessed with his recently deceased twin sister. Deeply depressed on Christmas Eve, he picks up a prostitute that bears a striking similarity to his dead sibling, but spending the night with her only sends him further into complete madness.

This short story is known for bearing a similarity to one of Edgar Allan Poe's lesser known works, Berenice.

== Plot ==
Like Senso, the story is framed in the form of the protagonist's secret manuscript. Maria, the main character's nurse, to her horror comes across this document and narrates its disturbing contents to the reader.

Giorgio is a disturbed young man from Turin, vacationing in Milan in hopes of finally coping with the death of his twin sister Emelia, with whom he has shared a close bond. But by Christmas Eve, his condition only worsens and he starts suffering from horrific stomach pains, unable to eat or drink.

By night fall, he comes across the residence of a young prostitute, whom he appears to have been stalking for days. In his mind, she is the spitting image of his deceased sister. Giorgio invites her to his hotel room. At first, the girl refuses, claiming that she is waiting for her husband, but finally gives in after Giorgio promises to reward her presence.

They arrive at his suite and Giorgio orders all the delicacies off the menu and, to the young prostitute's delight, a bottle of champagne. They eat and drink. Eventually, her company soothes Giorgio's nerves and his stomach pains subside.

When the girl smiles during dinner, Giorgio becomes fascinated with the girl's perfect white teeth. He asks if he could have one of her teeth in exchange for 500 lire. The girl laughs and agrees almost immediately, saying that she could easily get a prosthetic for 40 lire and keep the rest.

As the evening progresses, the prostitute entices Giorgio into sex games. He complies hesitantly, slowly realizing that her likeness to Emelia was only in his head and the girl is nothing but a trashy whore.

Eventually, the girl passes out from all the alcohol she consumed. Giorgio looks at her in disgust. Then, after brief hesitation, he grabs a butter knife and knocks a tooth out of her mouth. He takes it with him as he flees the inn, giving the innkeeper an envelope with 500 lire for the girl when she awakens.

This is where Giorgio's confession ends. Maria then finishes narrating the tale; Giorgio returns home from Milan and his condition quickly worsens. Soon, the depression and the stomach pains leave him bed ridden. Maria realizes that he has only a few days left to live.

As Giorgio lies on his deathbed, Maria receives an unexpected visitor in the form of a coarse city girl, who angrily announces that Giorgio still owes her for her services.

Ignoring Maria's protests, she storms into Giorgio's room. Upon seeing her, the dying man smiles weakly and whispers Emelia's name. He then takes out a necklace he has given his twin sister shortly before she died and places it on the young woman's bare chest. She takes a look at her new trinket and smiles broadly, revealing a hideous hole in her pearly white teeth. Upon seeing this, Giorgio screams in terror and dies.

== Themes ==
Like most of Boito's works, the story deals heavily with the exploration of vanity, this time the vanity of a trashy prostitute and a young man obsessed with his dead sibling.

And sharing a similarity with Boito's earlier work The Body, the tale delves heavily into necrophilia, made only more disturbing with the connotations of incest, since Giorgio's obsession with Emelia is sexual.

Since Giorgio is psychologically disturbed and suffering from a painful illness and delusional fantasies, A Christmas Eve can also be described an example of a short story with an unreliable narrator.

== Short film adaptation ==
A short film adaptation, updated to 1945 and titled Christmas Eve '45 (in the vein of Tinto Brass' re-imagining of Boito's Senso) premiered on October 13, 2012 at the PollyGrind Film Festival.
