= Villa Piovene =

16th-century villa in Vicenza, Italy

Coordinates: 45°44′48″N 11°31′36″E

UNESCO World Heritage Site
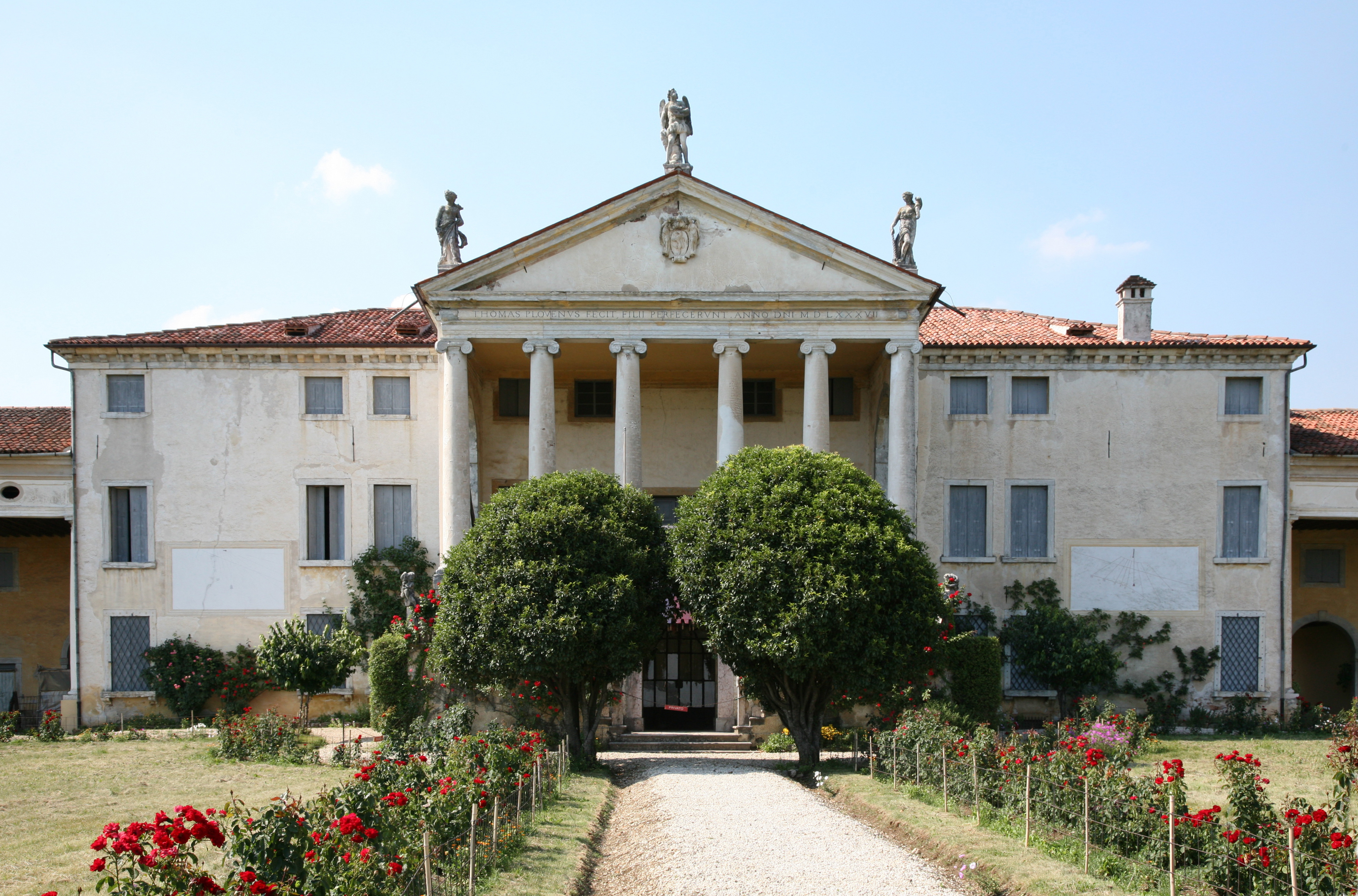

- Location within Veneto Location within Italy
- Location: Lugo di Vicenza, Veneto, Italy
- Part of: City of Vicenza and the Palladian Villas of the Veneto
- Criteria: Cultural: (i), (ii)
- Reference: 712bis-025
- Inscription: 1996 (20th Session)

Villa Piovene is a Palladian villa built in Lugo di Vicenza, province of Vicenza, northern Italy. The building was commissioned in the 16th century for the aristocratic Venetian Piovene family, their architect believed to have been Andrea Palladio. It is part of the World Heritage Site "City of Vicenza and the Palladian Villas of the Veneto" since 1996.

== History ==
Villa Piovene was built circa 1539–1540 in competition to and within the immediate vicinity of Villa Godi, which rises only a few hundred metres away. Rivalries have been proven to exist between the Piovene and Godi noble families. The villa was the ambition of Battista Piovene and his son Tommaso Piovene; the latter was probably responsible for commissioning the structure. The Piovene family seemed less interested in matching the size of Villa Godi as they were in the choice of the artisan workshop carrying out the work, that of Giovanni di Giacomo da Porlezza, who also was responsible for the execution of Villa Godi, of the Pedemuro workshop, where Andrea Palladio was employed.

More doubts than certainties surround Palladio's involvement in the execution of the Villa. The building was not included in the Quattro libri dell'architettura (published 1570), although other certainly autograph villas were also excluded (such as the Villa Gazzotti or the Villa Valmarana at Vigardolo). The characteristics of the building itself are most perplexing: the plan is hardly sophisticated, the windows pierce the façade without any particular order, and the pronaos is awkwardly joined to the building block.

== Architecture ==
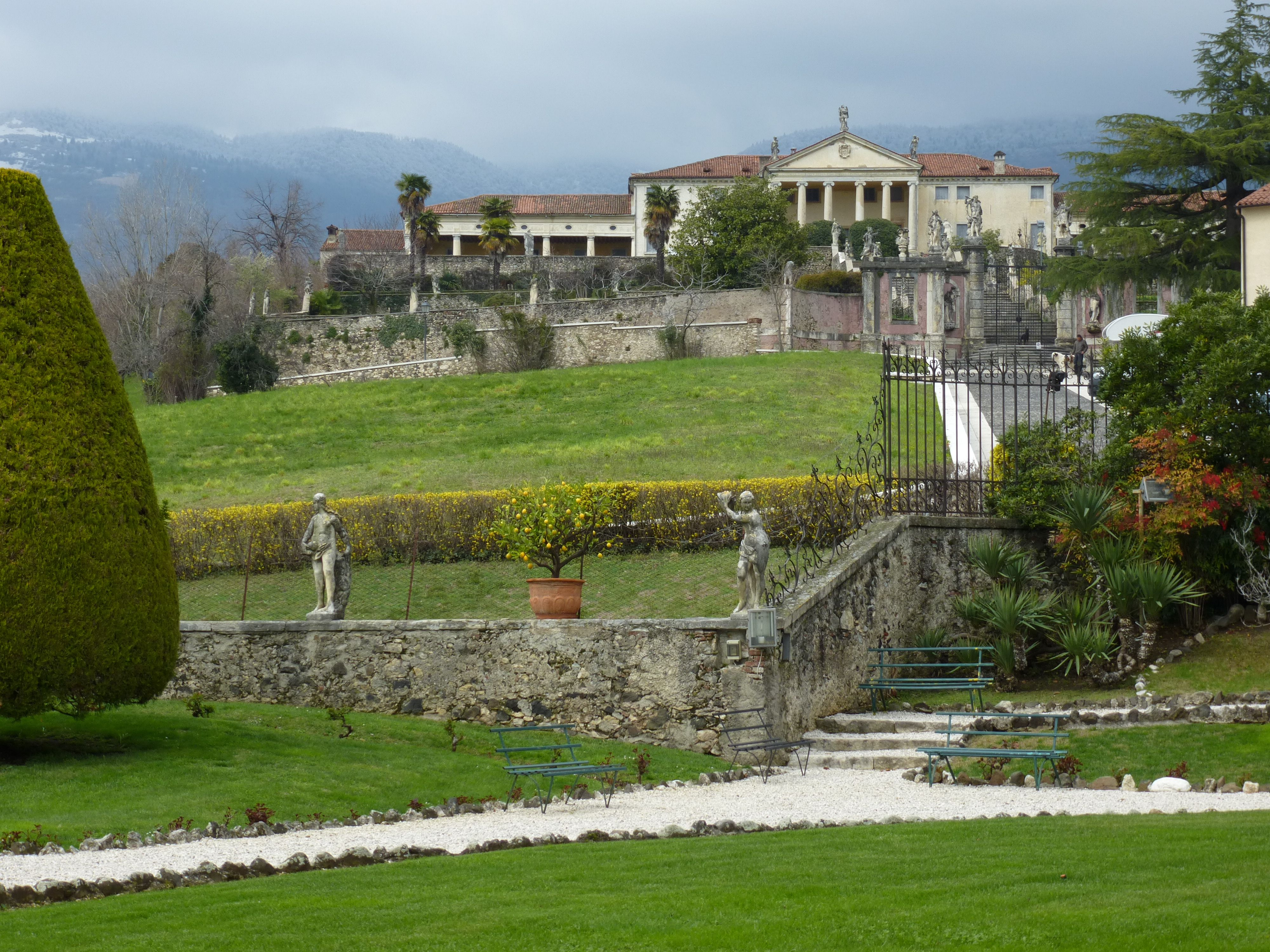
Villa Piovene, 2013

The villa is the product of three campaigns of work: documents demonstrate the existence of a manorial house, smaller than the present one and constructed before 1541, which was enlarged at a later stage by the addition of the pronaos bearing the inscribed date 1587: so the loggia that projects in the center—six Ionic columns supporting a triangular gable—may have begun by Palladio circa 1570 and completed after his death. The extension of the mansion and the vertical window rhythms can also be assumed to have taken place within the 1570s in accordance with Palladio's wishes, though not carried out by him.

In the first half of the 18th century, the architect Francesco Muttoni constructed the lateral barchesse (side farm wings), laid out the garden and probably executed the double-ramp stairs which lead to the loggia. The scenographic stair by which one accedes to the villa, however, was realised some years prior together with the handsome gate of 1703.

Today, the villa is seen against a picturesque backdrop of a garden, which was laid out in the 19th century, situated in the plain of the Astico River. In 1996, UNESCO included the building within the World Heritage Site "City of Vicenza and the Palladian Villas of the Veneto".

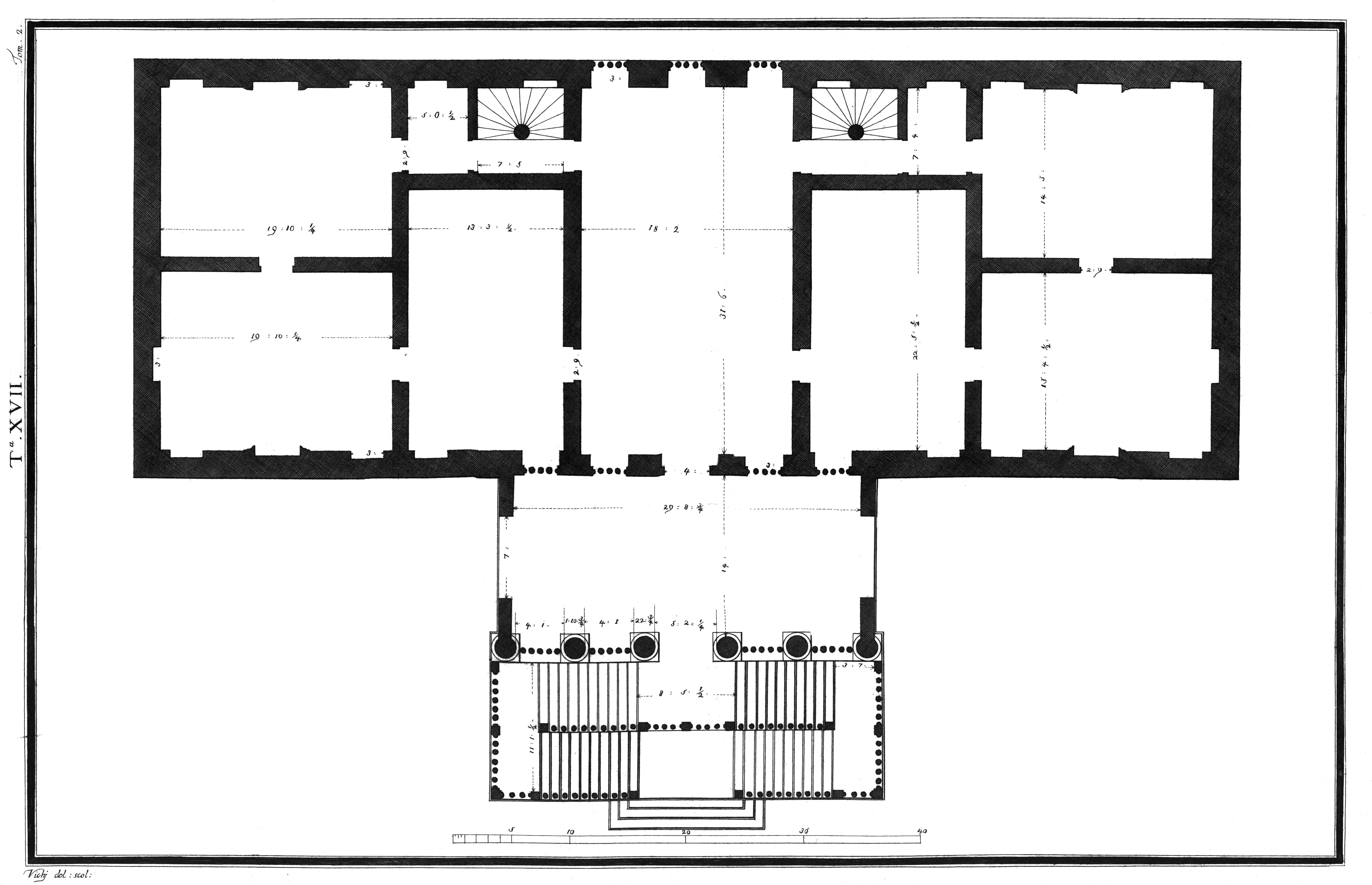
Floor plan (drawing by Ottavio Bertotti Scamozzi, 1778)

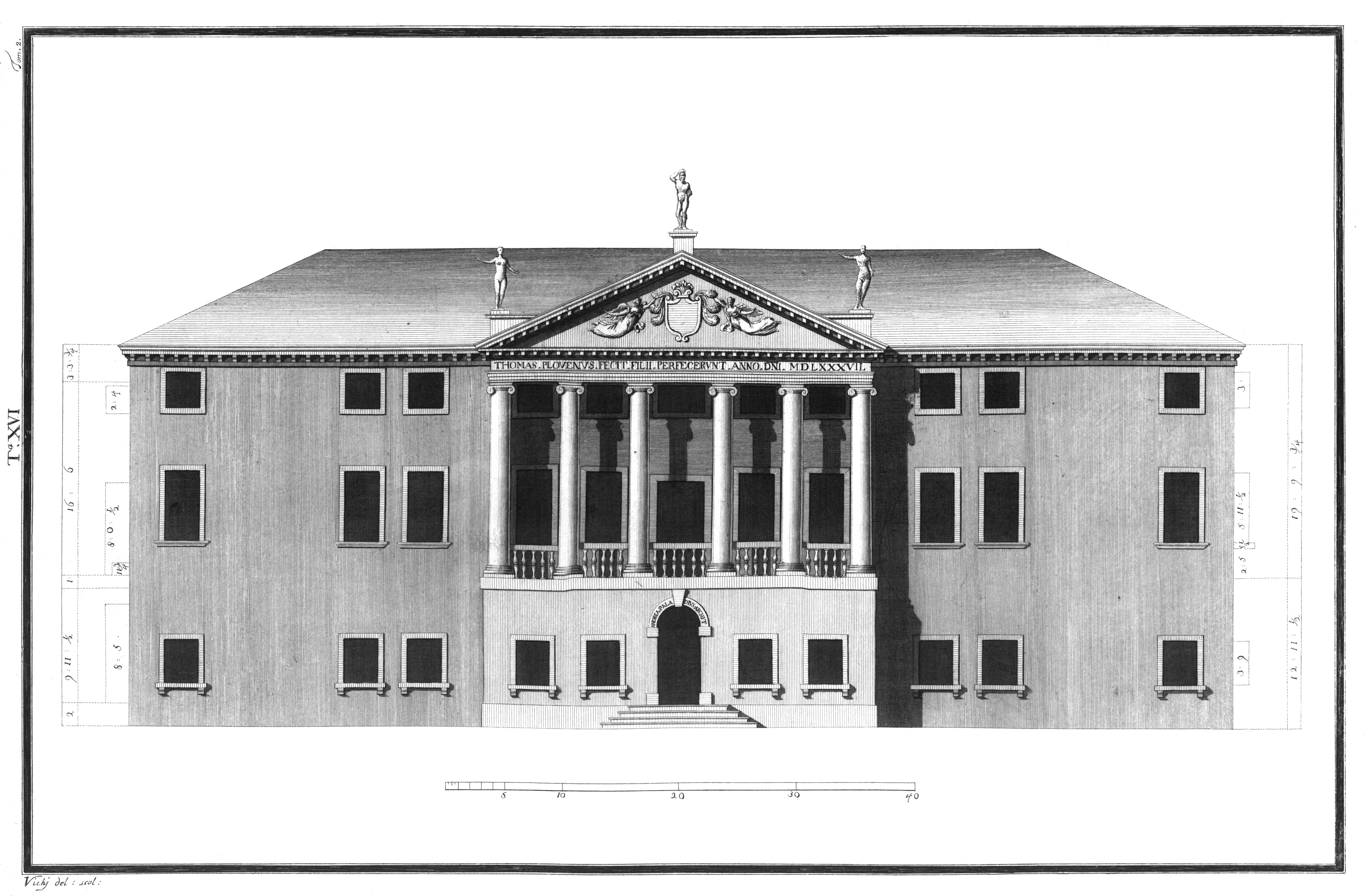
Main facade (drawing by Ottavio Bertotti Scamozzi, 1778)

== See also ==
- Palladian Villas of the Veneto
- Palladian architecture
