= Villa Gazzotti Grimani =

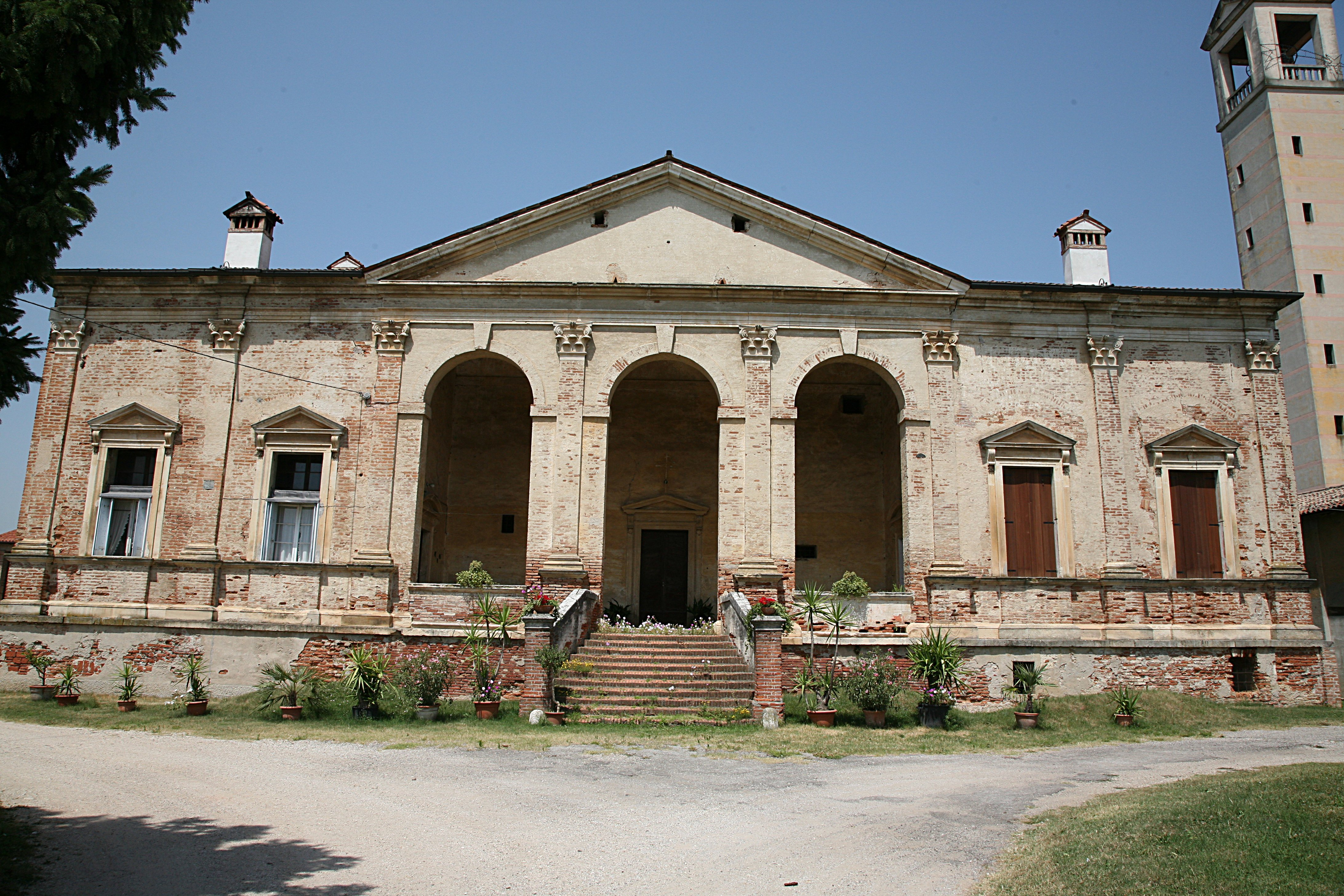

- Location within Veneto Location within Italy

General information
- Architectural style: Palladian
- Location: Bertesina nr Vicenza, Italy
- Coordinates: 45°33′34″N 11°36′03″E
- Construction started: 1542
- Completed: c. 1550
- Client: Taddeo Gazzotti

Design and construction
- Architect: Andrea Palladio

UNESCO World Heritage Site
- Part of: City of Vicenza and the Palladian Villas of the Veneto
- Criteria: Cultural: (i), (ii)
- Reference: 712bis-003
- Inscription: 1994 (18th Session)
- Extensions: 1996
- Area: 0.9 ha (2.2 acres)

The Villa Gazzotti Grimani (1542) is a Renaissance villa, an early work of architect Andrea Palladio, located in the village of Bertesina, near Vicenza in the Veneto region of northern Italy.

In 1994 UNESCO designated Villa Gazzotti Grimani as part of the "Vicenza, City of Palladio" World Heritage Site. Two years later the World Heritage Site was expanded to include Palladian villas outside the core area and accordingly it was renamed as "City of Vicenza and Palladian Villas of the Veneto".

== Architecture ==
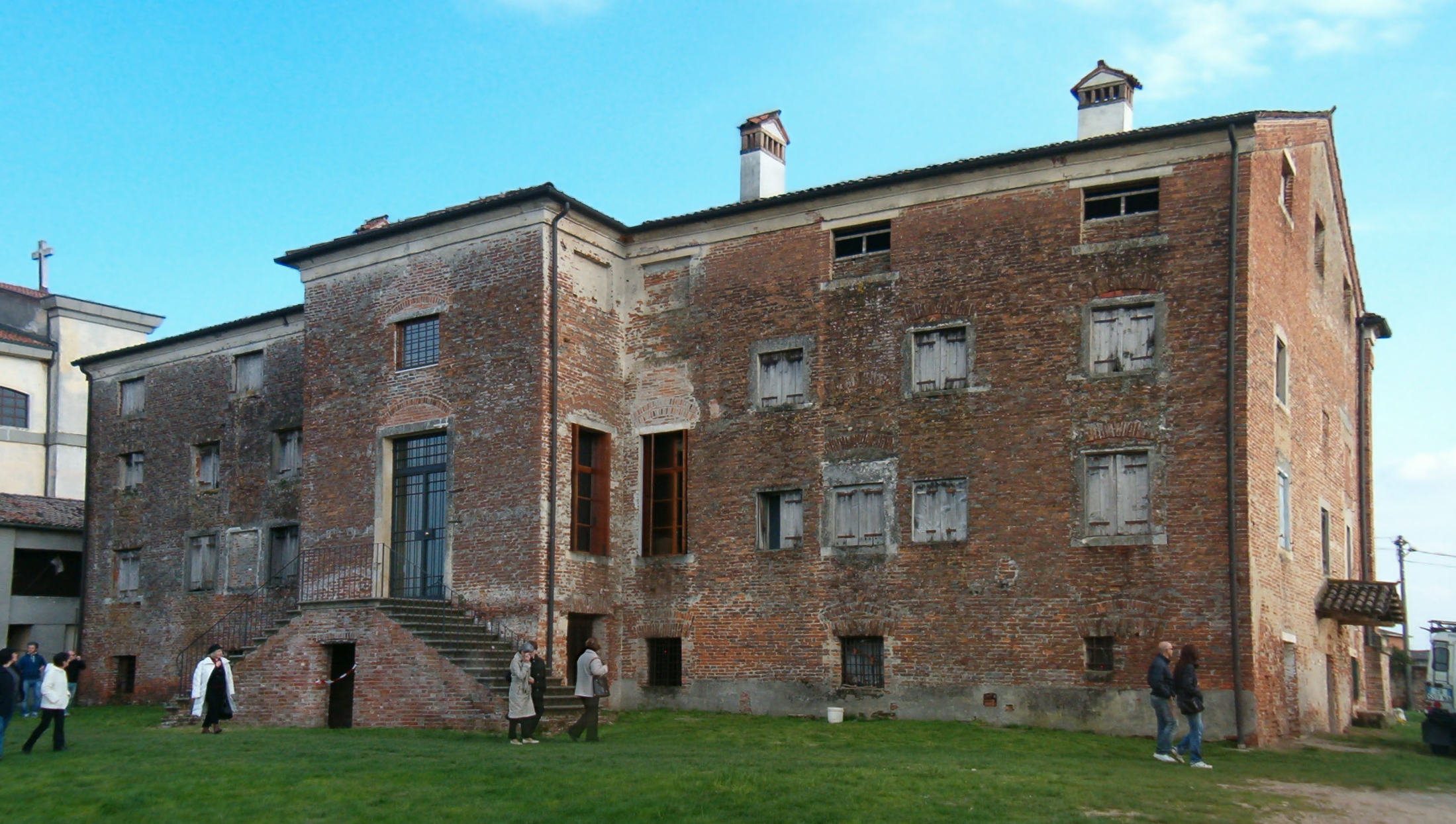
Panorama retro

The villa was designed and built in the 1540s for the Venetian Taddeo Gazzotti and, like a number of Palladio's buildings, it incorporates a pre-existing structure. In 1550, before the building was completed, Gazzotti was facing financial problems and sold the villa to Girolamo Grimani. The external form of the villa shows the person who commissioned it to have been a man who wanted to make his influence clearly visible. For the first time Palladio presents the body of the building as a clearly defined cube. The three-fold arcade in the central section, which is reminiscent of Villa Godi, is crowned by a pediment and is the dominant shape of the facade. It is less the embodiment of an original body of thought of Palladio's – comparable examples can be found both in Villa Agostini in Cusignana and in the architecture of Giovanni Maria Falconetto – than of his endeavour to give existing forms of new expression. What is new is that the three-fold arcade takes up the entire height of the one-story building. Equally, the use of a pediment as a symbol of dignity has no counterpart in Venetian secular architecture of that time. A wide flight of steps was originally meant to lead up to the loggia; the narrow flight of steps which now leads up to the center arcade in the loggia is a latter addition.

The body of the building rests on a base, from which it is divided by means of a ledge which runs along the entire width of the facade. On the one hand, this serves to protect the working areas from damp, but on the other hand, it also raises the villa above the surrounding landscape. This use of a base is to be found in a number of Palladio's villas, but it was not his invention; Giovanni Maria Falconetto placed the Villa Vescovile in Luvigliano, which was begun in 1534, on a base.

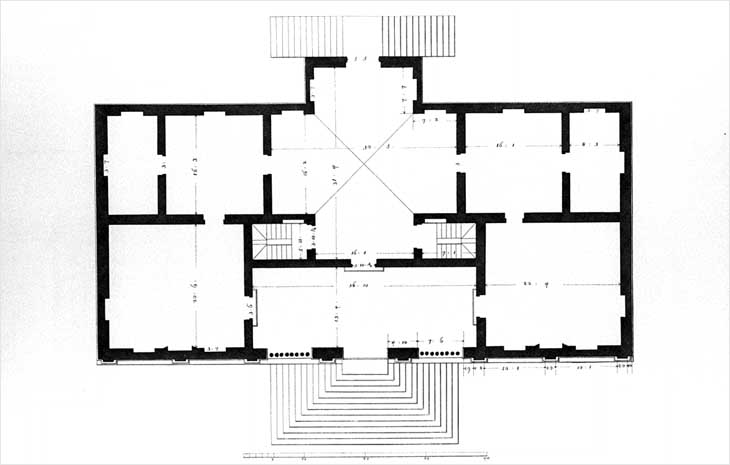
Floor plan, drawn by Ottavio Bertotti Scamozzi, 1778

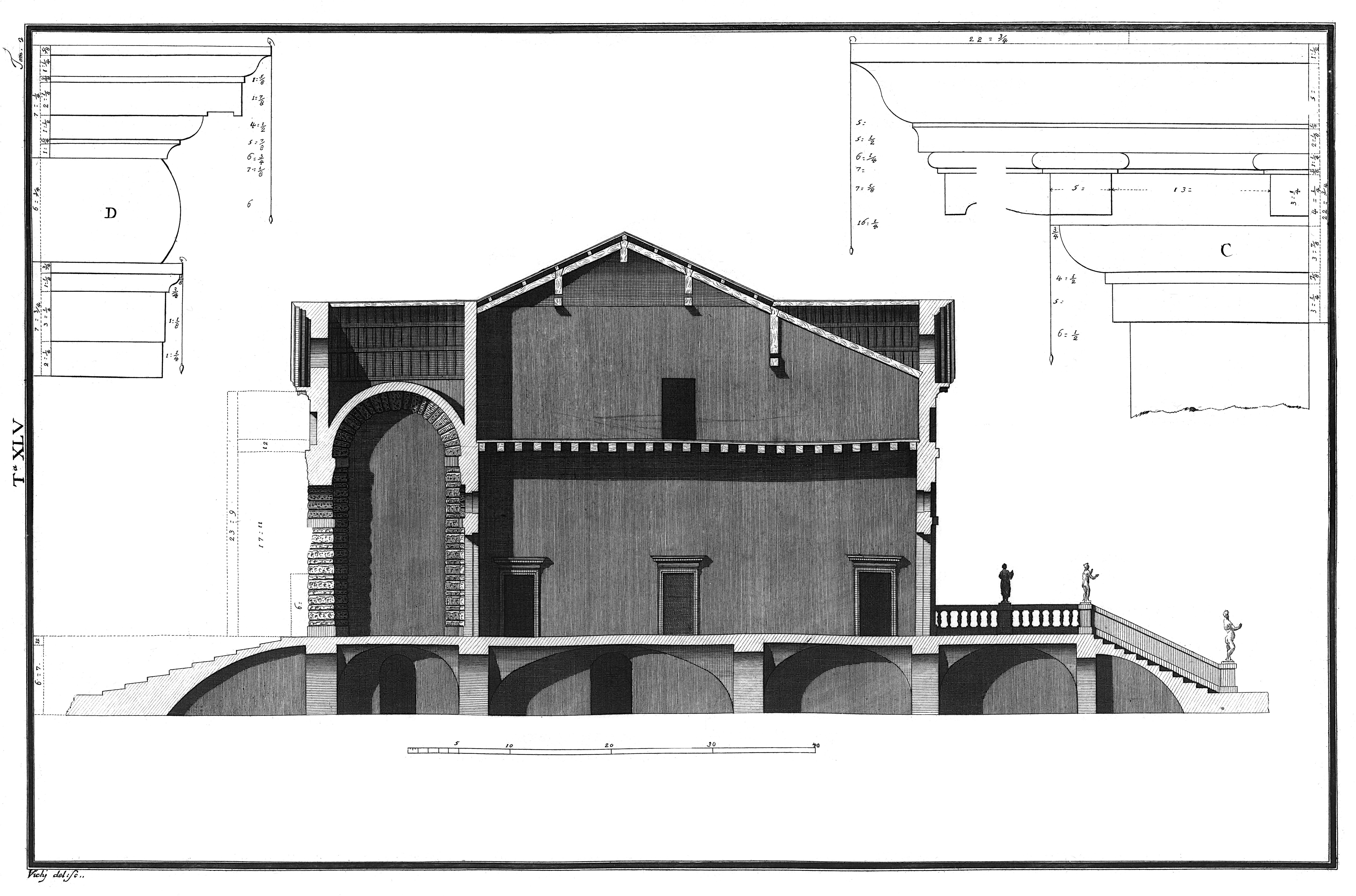
Cross section (Ottavio Bertotti Scamozzi, 1778)

Along with this adoption of contemporary architectural thinking, the Villa Gazzotti also shows what was in the Venetian territories a new way of treating wall surfaces. It is not the closed parts of the facade, but the open loggia which takes up the dominating position on the villa's facade. Beyond this, the way in which Palladio treats his facade makes it clearly recognisable that it is his intention to give the wall surface plastic structure. Eight pilasters with Composite capitals that project gently from the surface of the wall divide the facade into eight vertical rhythms. At the same time, the central part, distinguished by its three-fold arcade, is offset slightly from the rest of the facade. The windows are connected firmly to the body of the building by means of a lower window ledge which runs along the entire width of the facade and is offset along with pedestals of the pilasters. In contrast to the Villa Godi and the Villa Piovene, the windows are no longer merely perforations in the wall, but through their plastic profiles and the protruding triangular gables at their tops have become independent structural elements on the facade.

Even though Palladio endeavoured to open up the wall, which is usually seen as a border, the facade of Villa Gazzotti still has a lot of unshaped wall surface above the windows. Nonetheless, the multiple layering of the wall by means of the arrangement of pilasters, window profiles and triangular gables is a clear indication that Palladio is now endeavouring to model and shape the massive body of the building derived from Venetian two-towered buildings through the use of a plastic structure and wide openings. The capitals, which conclude the pilasters, carry a multiple offset and variously-terraced entablature.

The villa is currently in need of restoration, particularly the exterior stucco which has peeled to expose the underlying brickwork. The restored Villa Saraceno is an example of how impressive restored stucco can look.

== See also ==
- Palladian Villas of the Veneto
- Palladian architecture
