= Senso (novel) =

Italian novella by Camillo Boito

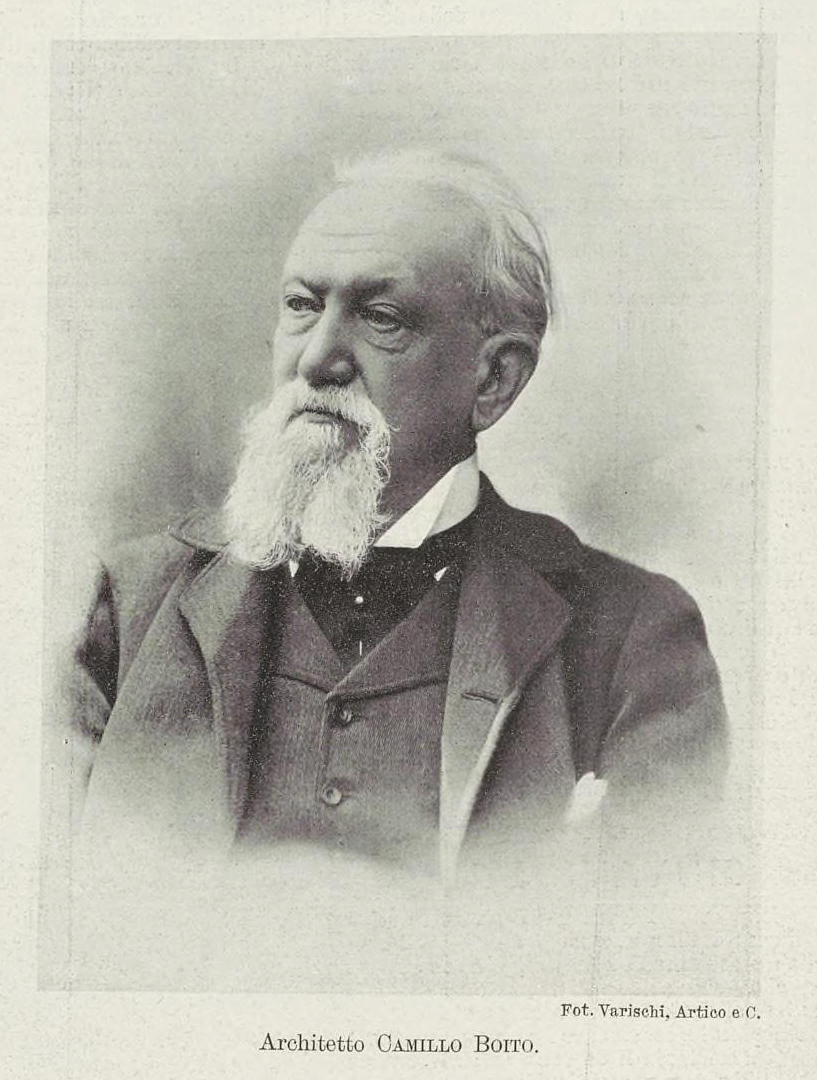
Camillo Boito (1836-1914)

Senso is an Italian novella by Camillo Boito, an Italian author and architect. He wrote it around 1882. The novella develops a disturbing account of indiscriminate indulgence in selfish sensuality. The word "senso" is Italian for "sense," "feeling," or "lust." The title refers to the delight Livia experiences while reflecting on her affair with a handsome lieutenant. The novella is typical of Scapigliatura literature, which was at its peak at the time.

== Summary ==
Senso is set in Venetia and Trentino about the time of Third Italian War of Independence in 1866. Its protagonist is Livia, a countess from Trento, who is married unhappily to a stuffy old aristocrat, and who willingly wanders in response to her yearnings.

The story opens a few years after the war, with Livia reminiscing on her 39th birthday about her first truly passionate affair. Her reverie transports us to Venice during the war, where Livia falls in love with Remigio Ruz, a dashing young lieutenant in the Austrian army.

Although he obviously is using her, her money, and her social status, Livia throws herself into an affair of complete sexual abandon with Remigio. She lets him spend her money freely, cares nothing of what society thinks of her, and ignores her new lover's pathetic cowardice when he refuses to rescue a drowning child.

Though the war drives the lovers apart, Livia feels driven to revisit Remigio. When she joins him for a tryst, he asks for more money, to bribe the army doctors for a reprieve from the battlefield. Livia gladly gives him all her jewels and gold. Remigio flees to Verona, without bothering even to kiss her goodbye.

Eventually her yearning for Remigio drives Livia nearly mad, but her spirits soar when a letter from him finally arrives. His letter says that he loves and misses her, and that her money and his bribery had allowed him to evade any combat. He asks Livia not to look for him. Still clutching his letter, she promptly boards a carriage and heads straight to Verona to find her loyal lover.

She finds the city in ruins, with dead and wounded everywhere. Livia's undeterred. She heads to the apartment she had bought for Remigio, where she finds him, a drunken, ungrateful rogue, in the company of a prostitute who openly mocks Livia for accepting his abuse.

Mortification drives Livia out into the night. Shame shapes her lingering lust into vengeance when Livia remembers she still has his letter. Livia finds the Austrian army headquarters, where she indicts Remigio by presenting his proof of desertion to a general. Her vengeance for Remigio's philandering infidelity is obvious to the general, yet her motives lend her lover no exemption. The very next morning, Remigio and the doctors he bribed face a firing squad while Livia attends the execution.

== Style ==
The novella presents Livia's perspective exclusively, in the form of her secret diary. She distinctly describes her selfish lust, her sexual desire, and something akin to joy that she feels on the occasion of her lover's execution.

Unlike the authors of such similar characters as Anna Karenina and Madame Bovary, Camillo Boito presents his protagonist without sympathy. Senso's Livia is conscious of her conduct and may cherish the consequence. She feels either indifferent or oblivious to the damage she might do to others. She's ingenuously remorseless, while single-mindedly seeking what is best for herself alone.

== Adaptations ==
Luchino Visconti very loosely adapted the novella in 1954 using the same title, but with heavy alterations to characters and introducing numerous new subplots, such as Livia's rebellious cousin Roberto, whose fight against the Austrian occupation troops is chronicled in a good deal of battles. The adaptation moves closer to the war, depicting it explicitly, whilst pushing Livia's back story into the background (unlike the novella, which is narrated through Livia's secret diary – and thus, solely focused on her perception – the film forsakes the diary and switches to third-person narration). The film starred Alida Valli as Livia and Farley Granger as her duplicitous lover.

Tinto Brass adapted the story in 2002 as Senso '45 after reading the novella and finding himself unsatisfied with Visconti's liberally adapted version. The film starred Anna Galiena as Livia and Gabriel Garko as her lover. The story of the film is much more faithful to Camillo Boito's work than the earlier adaptation in terms of tone and story, but the action was transported from the Third Italian War of Independence to the end of World War II, with Remigio becoming a Nazi Lieutenant and Livia updated to being the wife of a high ranking Fascist official. Brass later explained that the change in time was made because he did not want to compete with Visconti's vision of Risorgimento-era Italy. Unlike the 1954 version, Senso '45 did not romanticize the affair between Livia and Ruz (Helmut Schultz in the 2002 film), but showed it for what it was: a clinical study in vanity and lust. However, it should be worth noting that both films significantly altered Livia's character, making her much older and sympathetic than she appeared in Boito's original novella.

In 2011, an opera based on the novella premiered in Teatro Massimo in Palermo, Sicily, with music by Marco Tutino. The role of Livia in the premiere was played by Nicola Beller Carbone.

== See also ==
For books or films with similar themes:

- Anna Karenina
- In the Realm of the Senses
- Lady Chatterley's Lover
- Lady Macbeth of the Mtsensk District
- La Regenta
- Madame Bovary
- The End of the Affair
- Venus in Furs (a gender role reversal on the same themes as Senso.)
