= Senso '45 =

- Directed by: Tinto Brass
- Written by: Tinto Brass
- Based on: Senso by Camillo Boito
- Produced by: Giuseppe Colombo
- Starring: Anna Galiena; Gabriel Garko
- Cinematography: Massimo Di Venanzo; Daniele Nannuzzi
- Edited by: Tinto Brass; Fiorenza Muller
- Music by: Ennio Morricone
- Distributed by: Eagle Pictures
- Release date: 12 April 2002
- Running time: 128 minutes
- Country: Italy
- Language: Italian
- Budget: 350,000 dollars

Senso '45 (also released internationally as Black Angel) is an Italian erotic drama film written and directed by Tinto Brass, based on the novella Senso by Camillo Boito, which also inspired Luchino Visconti's 1954 film.

Instead of being set during the Third Italian War of Independence, the film is set in Venice during the last months of the fascist regime.

== Plot ==
Livia Mazzoni, the wife of a senior manager of MinCulPop, departs from Asolo to Venice, where she meets her lover Helmut Schultz, an officer of the SS. During her car trip, Livia remembers the sexual drift that brought her up to that point, overwhelming her in a whirlwind of erotic adventures, illicit trafficking, shady characters who move in the shadow of the disarraying fascist regime in the final months of World War II.

== Cast ==
- Anna Galiena as Livia Mazzoni
- Gabriel Garko as Helmut Schultz
- Antonio Salines as Carlo
- Franco Branciaroli as Ugo Oggiano
- Loredana Cannata as Ninetta
- Simona Borioni as Elsa

Tinto Brass said that at first Anna Galiena seemed doubtful about accepting the role, but then she insisted on having the part, and stubbornly asked to audition. So she went to the director's studio in Isola Farnese where, in order to guarantee the utmost privacy, Brass covered the glass panels of the door with a dark cloth. The actress undressed completely naked and told Brass that her initial uncertainty stemmed from the fact that she had little pubic hair.

== Production ==
Tinto Brass re-adapted the source novella as Senso '45 in 2002 when he read it and found himself unsatisfied with Visconti's rather liberal adaptation. The film starred Anna Galiena as Livia and Gabriel Garko as her lover. The story of the film is much more faithful to Camillo Boito's work than the earlier adaptation in terms of tone and story, but the action was transported from the War of Unification to the end of World War II, with Remigio becoming a Nazi Lieutenant and Livia updated to being the wife of a high ranking Fascist official. Brass later explained that the change in time was made because he did not want to compete with Visconti's vision of Risorgimento-era Italy. The film was shot in Rome and Venice. Brass chose "the dark, sybaritic Venice of the late Fascist era", describing it as a city "under curfew, yet a place where orgiastic parties took place—parties I regret missing, as I was too young at the time, though I clearly remember the stories about them and the remnants left behind the next day near the doorways." The Hotel Luna bar was reconstructed for the film in the Salone delle Fontane at the EUR complex in Rome.

Unlike the 1954 version, Senso '45 did not romanticize the affair between Livia and Remigio/Mahler (now named "Helmut Schultz" in the new adaptation). Rather, the film showed it as a clinical study of vanity and lust. The film won Italian cinema's "Silver Ribbon" Award for Best Costume Design.

== Awards and nominations ==
=== Nastro d'Argento Awards (2002) ===
- Nastro d'Argento for Best Costume Design - Alessandro Lai and Alberto Moretti
