= Being Human (1994 film) =

- Theatrical release poster
- Directed by: Bill Forsyth
- Written by: Bill Forsyth
- Produced by: Robert F. Colesberry; David Puttnam
- Starring: Robin Williams; John Turturro; Anna Galiena; Vincent D'Onofrio; Hector Elizondo; Lorraine Bracco; Ewan McGregor; Lindsay Crouse
- Cinematography: Michael Coulter
- Edited by: Michael Ellis
- Music by: Michael Gibbs
- Production companies: Enigma Productions; Fujisankei; British Sky Broadcasting; NatWest Ventures
- Distributed by: Warner Bros.
- Release date: 6 May 1994
- Running time: 122 minutes
- Countries: United Kingdom; Japan
- Languages: English; Gaelic; Friulian
- Budget: $40 million
- Box office: $5 million

Being Human is a 1994 comedy-drama film written and directed by Bill Forsyth and starring Robin Williams, John Turturro, Bill Nighy, Vincent D'Onofrio, Robert Carlyle, Theresa Russell and Ewan McGregor in his feature-film debut. An international co-production of the United Kingdom and Japan, the film portrays the experience of a single human soul, portrayed by Williams, through various incarnations. Williams is the only common actor throughout the stories that span man's history on Earth.

An attempt on director-screenwriter Bill Forsyth's part to depict by visual means the ordinariness of life throughout the ages, Being Human is deliberately slow in its pace to emphasize how slow life often is. The structure is one of vignette-like character studies of one man (actually five distinct men, all with the same soul) who keeps making the same relationships and mistakes throughout his lifetimes.

== Plot ==
In the first incarnation, a caveman's family is taken from him by raiders, due to his cowardice and hesitation. Before his wife is taken away, she shouts, "Don't lose the children!"

The next incarnation is in ancient Rome, where he, Hector, is a slave to a "foolish master" who loses his fortune and is compelled by his creditors to kill himself. He orders Hector to join him. Hector longs to be free to find the children and wife he had before he became a slave, but he has fallen in love with another slave and forgets his waiting family.

In the third incarnation, Hector is a Scottish crusader on his way home to his children. The soul of his master from his life in Rome is now a crusader trying to decide whether to become a priest. They travel together until Hector finds his soulmate from the life in Rome. She is a widow and wishes for Hector to join her family, but his duties to his children in Scotland pull at him.

In the fourth incarnation, Hector is finally forced to confront his capacity for cowardly indecision. He is a Portuguese man in the Renaissance shipwrecked on the coast of Africa. He is the master in this life, his wife from the first incarnation shipwrecked with him as his spurned lover, and the raider who spirited her away is her steadfast friend.

In the fifth incarnation, Hector is a modern man in New York, paying the consequences of cowardly indecision, and gaining the strength to address the children he lost lifetimes ago. He is joined in this life by his master/slave/friend/soul mate, and ex-wife, Janet, and her husband/raider from lifetimes past. They support him, but they are trying to find their own way, as in their past lives.

== Cast ==
- Robin Williams as Hector
- John Turturro as Lucinnius
- Bill Nighy as Julian
- Vincent D'Onofrio as The Priest
- Robert Carlyle as The prehistoric Shaman
- Theresa Russell as The Storyteller
- Simon McBurney as Hermes
- Hector Elizondo as Dom Paulo
- Lizzy McInnerny as Ursula
- John Finn as Detective Cobb
- William H. Macy as Boris
- Lorraine Bracco as Anna
- Anna Galiena as Beatrice
- Jonathan Hyde as Francisco
- Ewan McGregor as Alvarez
- Lindsay Crouse as Janet
- Kelly Hunter as Deidre

== Production ==
In August 1992, it was reported that Robin Williams would star in the Warner Bros. produced Being Human for director Bill Forsyth and producer David Puttnam.

The film had a very problematic production, mainly due to financial issues and the ambition of Forsyth's screenplay. After poor test screenings, Warner Bros. instructed Bill Forsyth to trim 40 minutes from the film, as well as add narration and a happy ending. Forsyth's 160-minute cut was reduced to 122 minutes. Forsyth subsequently disowned the film.

== Release ==
The film was theatrically released on May 6, 1994. A home video release followed on September 28, 1994.

== Reception ==
=== Critical reception ===
Despite the changes, the film was still not well received on release. Owen Gleiberman of Entertainment Weekly gave the film an "F", and said that the film "demonstrates what can happen when a director with a gossamer comic touch tries to become commercial—the movie is so flat and banal it's like a Mel Brooks parody in which someone forgot to put in the jokes". Todd McCarthy of Variety criticised the plot and Williams' 'bland' performance, remarking, "Forsyth must have had some vision of the human animal’s position in the universe to prompt him to undertake such a project, but it became lost somewhere along the way. Indeed, the picture’s intellectual fabric proves stunningly thin." Peter Travers of Rolling Stone dubbed the film "a dreary mess".

Janet Maslin of The New York Times was more positive, declaring, "Aiming high and falling short of his own mark, Mr. Forsyth remains a film maker of vivid, unpredictable imagination." Time Out was also more receptive of the film, saying "The stories are low-key and deliberately anti-climactic, but they coalesce into a tender, contemplative whole that's profound and moving. ".

On Rotten Tomatoes, the film has a 54% rating, based on 13 reviews.

=== Box office ===
The film was one of the worst-performing films of the year, grossing just $5 million against its $40 million cost. It grossed $1.5 million in the United States and Canada.

=== Year-end worst-of lists ===
- 3rd – Glenn Lovell, San Jose Mercury News
- Top 4 (not ranked) – Stephen Hunter, The Baltimore Sun
- Stars with Multiple Roles in the Same Movies – Siskel & Ebert
- Worst (not ranked) – Bob Ross, The Tampa Tribune

== See also ==
- List of films featuring slavery
