= The Unknown Woman =

- Theatrical release poster
- Italian: La sconosciuta
- Directed by: Giuseppe Tornatore
- Written by: Giuseppe Tornatore; Massimo De Rita
- Produced by: Laura Fattori; Franco Committeri
- Starring: Kseniya Rappoport
- Cinematography: Fabio Zamarion
- Music by: Ennio Morricone
- Production companies: Medusa Film; Marigolda Film
- Distributed by: Medusa Film
- Release dates: 19 October 2006 (Rome Film Festival); 20 October 2006 (Italy)
- Running time: 118 minutes
- Country: Italy
- Language: Italian
- Box office: $6,850,853

The Unknown Woman (Italian: La sconosciuta, lit. 'The unknown'; also known as The Other Woman) is a 2006 Italian psychological thriller mystery film, directed by Giuseppe Tornatore that depicts a woman alone in a foreign country, haunted by a horrible past. Although it was selected as the Italian entry for Best Foreign Language Film at the 80th Academy Awards and made the shortlist, ultimately it was not nominated.

== Plot ==
Irena, a Ukrainian prostitute on the run, is determined to find a job in an elegant apartment building in northern Italy, and starts by cleaning the stairs. She does it in order to inch her way into working for a family residing in that building. She befriends Gina, the nanny of the family's child, Thea, who lives with the family in their apartment. When the nanny is crippled in a fall—tripped by Irena, but presumed to be accidental—Irena is hired to take her place. Through flashbacks, viewers learn that Irena has been physically and emotionally abused, and forced to bear nine children, all taken away at birth to be sold to adoptive families. After stabbing her pimp and leaving him for dead, she sets out to find her youngest child, whom she believes is Thea; hence the plot to work for them. Adoption documents in the apartment convince her that Thea is indeed her daughter. The mother grows suspicious of Irena and fires her, despite the loving relationship that has grown up between Irena and the child. Irena's pimp stalks her and sends out thugs to beat her up as she walks down the street. He rigs her employer's car, leading to a crash in which Thea's mother is killed. The pimp forces Irena to drive him to a location that may or may not contain the money Irena stole from him when she left him for dead. During a struggle, he falls and is killed when his head hits a rock. Thea's father moves to a new apartment and prepares a room for Irena, but as the police suspect foul play in the death of Thea's mother, Irena is taken into custody. She reveals both that the true culprit is the pimp and that she killed him. She is tried, convicted, and sent to jail. Thea stops eating until the judge allows Irena to visit her in the hospital and feed her. DNA testing reveals that Thea is not Irena's daughter after all. After she gets out of jail, she finds Thea, now a young lady, waiting for her.

== Cast ==
- Kseniya Rappoport as Irena
- Michele Placido as Muffa
- Claudia Gerini as Valeria Adacher
- Piera Degli Esposti as Gina
- Alessandro Haber as Matteo
- Clara Dossena as Thea Adacher
- Ángela Molina as Lucrezia (as Angela Molina)
- Margherita Buy as Irena's lawyer
- Pierfrancesco Favino as Donato Adacher
- Paolo Elmo as Nello, Irena's lover
- Nicola Di Pinto as Judge
- Valeria Flore as older Thea Adacher

== Reception ==
=== Critical response ===
The Unknown Woman has an approval rating of 67% on review aggregator website Rotten Tomatoes, based on 39 reviews, and an average rating of 6.2/10. The website's critical consensus states: "If it's occasionally manipulative, this Italian melodrama mixes thriller conventions with a poignant love story and keeps the tension rolling from start to finish". Metacritic assigned the film a weighted average score of 56 out of 100, based on 15 critics, indicating "mixed or average reviews".

=== Awards and nominations ===
- David di Donatello (Italy)
  - Won: Best Actress – Leading Role (Kseniya Rappoport)
  - Won: Best Cinematography (Fabio Zamarion)
  - Won: Best Director (Giuseppe Tornatore)
  - Won: Best Film
  - Won: Best Music (Ennio Morricone)
  - Nominated: Best Actor – Leading Role (Michele Placido)
  - Nominated: Best Costume Design (Nicoletta Ercole)
  - Nominated: Best Editing (Massimo Quaglia)
  - Nominated: Best Producer
  - Nominated: Best Production Design (Tonino Zera)
  - Nominated: Best Screenplay (Francesco Tornatore)
  - Nominated: Best Sound (Gilberto Martinelli)
- European Film Awards
  - Won: Audience Award – Best Film (Giuseppe Tornatore)
  - Nominated: Best Actress – Leading Role (Kseniya Rappoport)
  - Nominated: Best Cinematographer (Fabio Zamarion)
  - Nominated: Best Director (Giuseppe Tornatore)
- Moscow Film Festival (Russia)
  - Won: Audience Award (Giuseppe Tornatore; tied with Molière)
  - Won: Silver St. George – Best Director (Giuseppe Tornatore)
  - Nominated: Golden St. George (Giuseppe Tornatore)
- Norwegian Film Festival (Norway)
  - Won: Audience Award (Giuseppe Tornatore)

== See also ==
- List of submissions to the 80th Academy Awards for Best Foreign Language Film
- List of Italian submissions for the Academy Award for Best Foreign Language Film
