= G. R. Aldo =

Italian cinematographer (1905–1953)

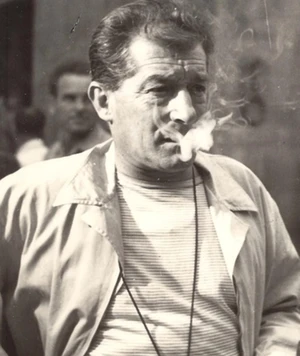
- Aldo in the 1940s
- Born: Aldo Rossano Graziati; January 5, 1905; Scorzè, Veneto, Kingdom of Italy
- Died: November 14, 1953 (aged 48); Pianiga, Veneto, Italy
- Occupation: Cinematographer

Aldo Rossano Graziati (January 5, 1905 – November 14, 1953), also G. R. Aldo (i.e. Graziati Rossano Aldo, his full name written in reverse), was an Italian cinematographer.

Also known as Aldò (from the French pronunciation of his name, as he worked many years in Paris), he distinguished himself with his refined technique and unique tonal sensitivity, especially with the lighting effects characteristic of the black and white of neorealism.

== Biography ==
Aldo moved to France in 1923, where he worked many years as choreographer, scenic photographer and operator. During the German occupation he moved to Nice, where he met Michelangelo Antonioni whom invited him to return to Italy.

In 1946, he went for an interview by Luchino Visconti. Two years later, he entrusted him with the role of cinematographer for his film La terra trema (The Earth Will Tremble).

Aldo died prematurely in 1953, due to an automobile accident between Padua and Venice. He was producing the film Senso, his first and only film in colour, at the time. The community theatre in his birthplace of Scorzè was named after him in commemoration.

== Filmography ==
- 1947 – Couleur de Venise
- 1948 – The Charterhouse of Parma
- 1948 – The Earth Will Tremble
- 1949 – Heaven over the Marshes
- 1950 – The Last Days of Pompeii
- 1950 – Tomorrow Is Too Late
- 1951 – Tomorrow Is Another Day
- 1951 – Miracle in Milan
- 1951 – Othello
- 1952 – Umberto D.
- 1952 – Three Forbidden Stories
- 1953 – The Wayward Wife
- 1953 – Terminal Station
- 1954 – Via Padova 46
- 1954 – Senso

== Awards ==
- 1950 – Italian National Syndicate of Film Journalists for Best Cinematography for Heaven Over the Marshes and Gli ultimi giorni di Pompei – Won
- 1955 – Italian National Syndicate of Film Journalists for Best Cinematography for Senso – Won
