= Valeria Flore =

Italian actress

- Born: Oristano, Italy
- Occupation: Actress
- Years active: 2006-

Valeria Flore is an Italian actress best known for her role as the adult Thea Adacher in the final scene of The Unknown Woman .

== Life and career ==
She graduated in scenography at the Accademia di Belle Arti di Sassari after a course in Acting and diction at the acting school of Saverio Deodato debuted in the advertising world in 2003; at the cinema he debuted in 2006 in The Unknown Woman, directed by the director Giuseppe Tornatore, to then perform various roles in television series, soap operas and advertising.

== Filmography ==
=== Films ===
- 2006: The Unknown Woman as old Thea Adacher
- 2007: Gadget Men as Sandra
- 2009: Interferenze
- 2013: Welcome Mr. President as Janis' sister
- 2014: Do You See Me? as waitress
- 2016: L'abbiamo fatta grossa as Head of collection center

=== TV series ===
- 2007: CentoVetrine as Camilla Ranieri
- 2010: Il peccato e la vergogna as Contessina Arabella Casati
- 2011: Viso d'angelo as Margherita Saltutti
- 2013: Volare - La grande storia di Domenico Modugno as girl
- 2017: È arrivata la felicità as Clelia
- 2017: Un posto al sole as Francesca Savarese
