= Il peccato e la vergogna =

- Genre: Period drama
- Created by: Teodosio Losito
- Starring: Gabriel Garko; Manuela Arcuri; Francesco Testi; Stefano Santospago; Viktorija Larčenko; Eros Galbiati; Laura Torrisi; Rosa Pianeta; Martine Brochard; Marisa Berenson; Eva Grimaldi; Valeria Milillo; Massimo Venturiello; Alfredo Pea; Giuliana De Sio; Stephan Käfer; Jennifer Bianchi; Rosalinda Cannavò; Massimiliano Morra; Christopher Leoni
- Country of origin: Italy
- Original language: Italian
- No. of seasons: 2
- No. of episodes: 16

Production
- Running time: 100 min (episode)

Original release
- Network: Canale 5
- Release: September 1, 2010 – February 14, 2014

Il peccato e la vergogna (The sin and the shame) is an Italian television series.

== Cast ==
- Manuela Arcuri: Carmen Tabacchi Fontamara (seasons 1-2)
- Marisa Berenson: Elena Fontamara (episode 1-3)
- Gabriel Garko: Nito Valdi (seasons 1-2)
- Francesco Testi: Giancarlo Fontamara (seasons 1-2)
- Victoria Larchenko: Elisa Fontamara (episode 1-5)
- Stefano Santospago: Francesco Fontamara (season 1)
- Eros Galbiati: Giulio Fontamara (episode 1-3)
- Giuliana De Sio: Bigiù (episode 1-5)
- Rosa Pianeta: Mina Tabacchi (seasons 1-2)
- Martine Brochard: Sylvie (season 1-2)
- Massimo Venturiello: Dilmo Duranti (season 1)
- Eva Grimaldi: Liliana (episode 4-5)
- Valeria Milillo: Piera (episode 3-6)
- Bruno Eyron: colonnello Kruger (episode 5)
- Laura Torrisi: Ortensia Pizzo (episode 6)
- Luka Tartaglia: Otello
- Rosalinda Celentano: Maria Pia Torricelli (episode 6)
- Alfredo Pea: Professor Gilsenti (episode 1-3)
- Isa Gallinelli: Meraviglia (episode 1-5)
- Adriana Russo: Teresina (episode 1-5)
- Giovanni Scifoni: Tony (episode 1)
- Pierpaolo Lovino: Commissario del Buono (episode 1-2)
- Massimo Corvo: Il Bisonte (episode 1)
- Valeria Flore: Contessina Arabella Casati (episode 1-4)
- Emilio Bonucci: Guido Tabacchi (episode 1-2)
- Giancosimo Pagliara: Gesualdo Griffi (episode 6)
- Aldo Bergamaschi: Enisio Pizzo (episode 1-3)
- Vincenzo Messina: Ninetto (episode 1)

== Soundtrack ==
These are the songs of Savio Riccardi used in the episodes:

Il Peccato E La Vergogna

- Il Peccato E La Vergogna
- Carmen
- Tema Dell'Abbandono
- Vento Di Guerra

Il Peccato E La Vergogna 2

- Incancellabili ricordi
- Momenti sereni
- Disperazione assoluta
- Trenodia
- Elsa
- Eterna minaccia

== See also ==
- List of Italian television series
