= Lugo di Vicenza =

- Comune
- Comune di Lugo di Vicenza
- Coat of arms

- Location within Italy Location within Veneto
- Coordinates: 45°45′N 11°32′E
- Country: Italy
- Region: Veneto
- Province: Vicenza (VI)
- Frazioni: Mare, Mortisa, Oltrastico

Area
  - Total: 14 km^{2} (5.4 sq mi)

Population (December 31, 2004)
  - Total: 3,706
  - Density: 260/km^{2} (690/sq mi)
- Demonym: Lughesi
- Time zone: UTC+1 (CET)
  - Summer (DST): UTC+2 (CEST)
- Postal code: 36030
- Dialing code: 0445
- Patron saint: St. John
- Website: Official website

Lugo di Vicenza is a town and comune in the province of Vicenza, Veneto, Italy. It is east of SP349 provincial road.

== Main sights ==
- Villa Godi, designed by Andrea Palladio, in the locality of Lonedo
- Villa Piovene, another Palladian villa
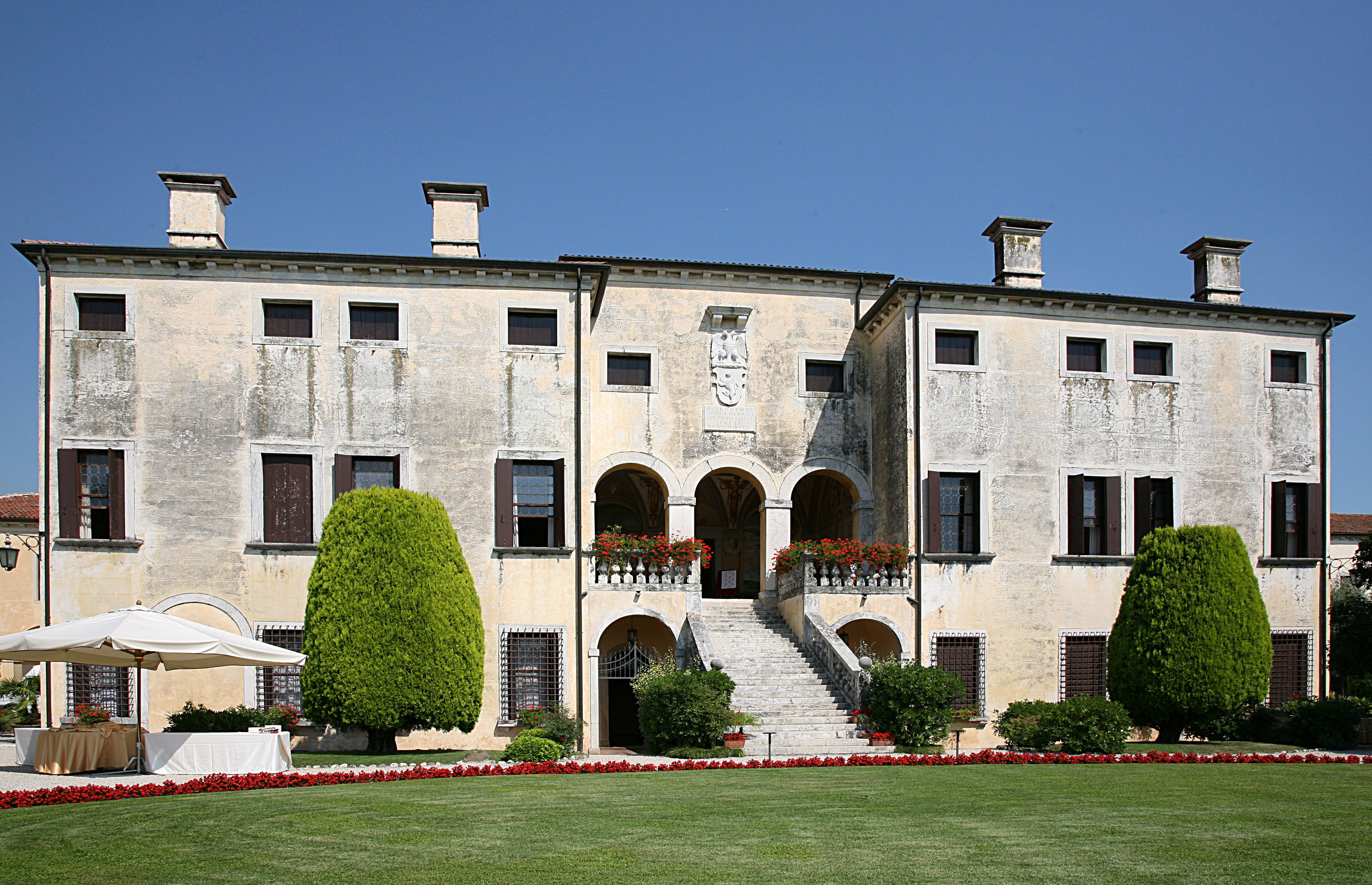
Villa Godi

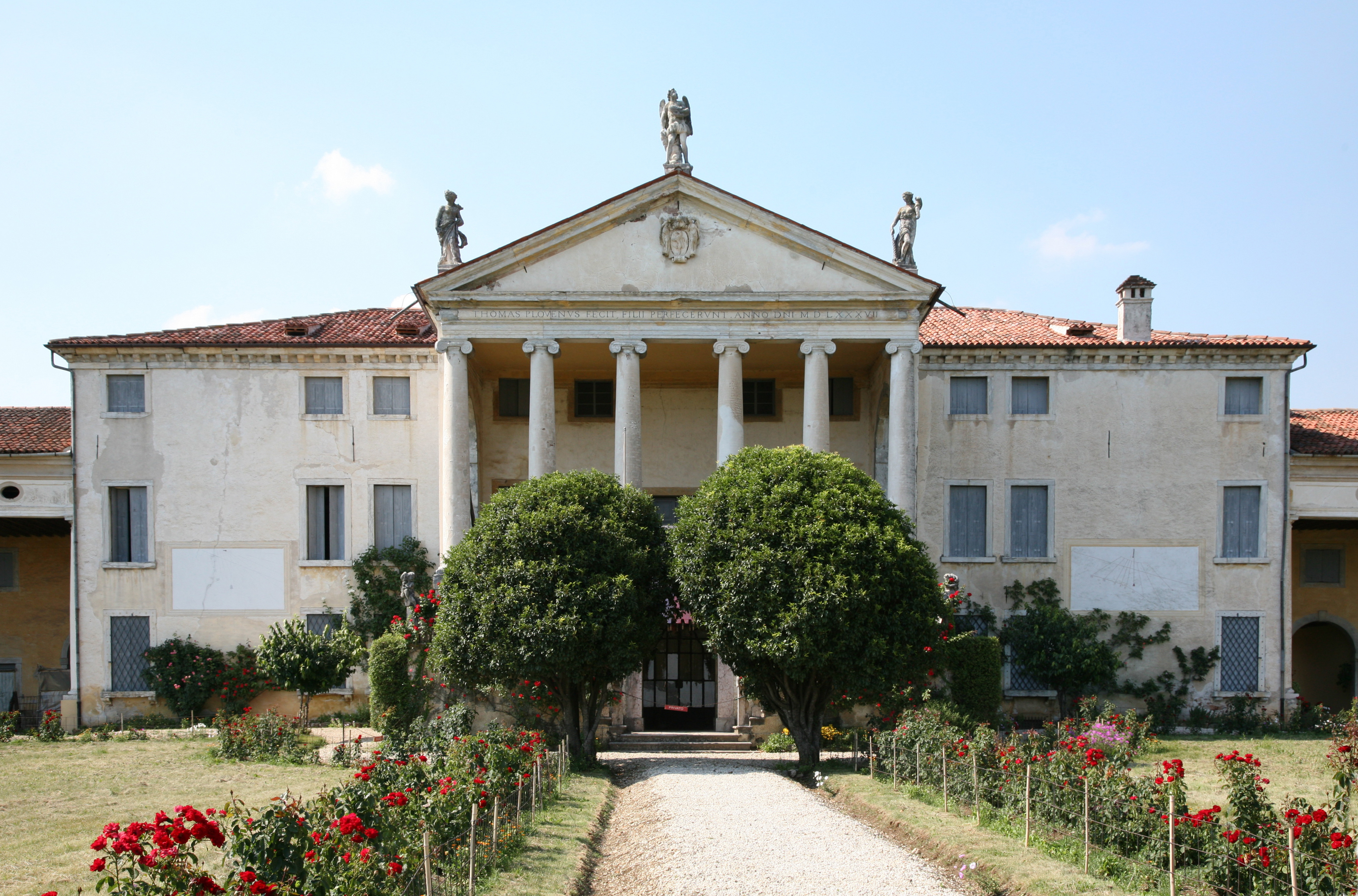
Villa Piovene

== Twin towns ==
Lugo di Vicenza is twinned with:

- Ostra Vetere, Italy
- Cerchiara di Calabria, Italy
- Uggiano la Chiesa, Italy
- Fossacesia, Italy
