= Rosalinda Cannavò =

Italian actress

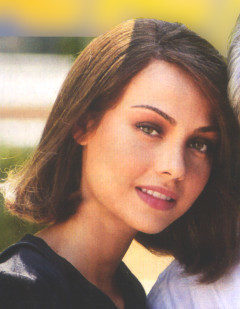
- Rosalinda Cannavò
- Born: 26 November 1992 (age 33); Messina, Italy
- Other name: Adua Del Vesco
- Occupations: Actress; singer
- Years active: 2012–present

Rosalinda Cannavò (born 26 November 1992), formerly known as Adua Del Vesco, is an Italian actress, singer and model.

== Early life and career ==
Growing up in Messina, Rosalinda Cannavò moved to Rome at the age of 16 to start her acting career. In 2012 she made her television debut, under the pseudonym Adua Del Vesco, in the third season of TV drama L'onore e il rispetto, directed by Alessio Inturri and Luigi Parisi. The pseudonym comes from the name of a protagonist in I colori della vita, a 2005 miniseries.

In January 2014 she made her cinematic debut in the film Sapore di te, directed by Carlo Vanzina. In the same year she returned to the small screen in the second season of Il peccato e la vergogna, directed by Alessio Inturri, Luigi Parisi and Mariano Lamberti. Cannavò also appeared in the two-part miniseries Rodolfo Valentino – La leggenda and Furore, both directed by Alessio Inturri.

In 2016 she starred in the TV series Non è stato mio figlio, directed by Alessio Inturri and Luigi Parisi, and Il bello delle donne... alcuni anni dopo, directed by Eros Puglielli. In the same year she made her debut as a singer with the singles Magico and Non c'è sole.

In 2018 she appeared in Furore – Capitolo Secondo, directed by Alessio Inturri. In the same year she played a young Veronica Lario in the film Loro by Paolo Sorrentino. On 30 December 2018 Adua launched the single Sei Sei Sei, written by Teodosio Losito, with a music video directed by Luigi Parisi.

In 2020 and 2021 she was a contestant in the fifth series of Grande Fratello VIP, the Italian version of the reality television franchise Big Brother, directed by Alfonso Signorini. During which she decided to give up her pseudonym and use her real name; she ranked seventh after being eliminated in the semi-final.

Since 2021 Cannavò has been in a relationship with Andrea Zenga, the son of football manager Walter Zenga and television presenter Roberta Termali.

She took part in the 2021 Milan Fashion Week modelling dresses for Impero Couture as part of her celebrity endorsement. She also modelled for the brand at the 14th Mia Sposa wedding fair. From September 2021 until June 2022 Cannavò presented the Italian talk show Casa Chi.

On 25 February 2022 she released a single, Sempre Avanti, with independent label QME music. In the same year she modelled for Nualy at Milan Fashion Week, as part of her celebrity endorsement of the brand.

In 2022, Cannavò also published a book Il riflesso di me, with Edizioni Piemme and took part in Rai 1 talent show, Tale e quale show.

== Personal life ==
She is engaged to Andrea Zenga, and they have a daughter. She considers herself Roman Catholic.

== Filmography ==
=== Films ===
Year	Title	Role	Notes
2014	Sapore di te	Beatrice	Credited as Adua Del Vesco
2018	Loro	24-year-old Veronica Lario	

=== Television ===
Year	Title	Role	Notes
2012	L'onore e il rispetto	Venere	Main role (season 3); 6 episodes
2014	Il peccato e la vergogna	Gigliola Pizzo	Recurring role; 4 episodes
2014	Rodolfo Valentino: La leggenda	Sally	Miniseries
2014–2018	Furore	Marisella Fiore	Main role
2016	Non è stato mio figlio	Nunzia Verderame	Main role
2017	Il bello delle donne… alcuni anni dopo	Evelina	Main role
2020–2021	Grande Fratello VIP	Contestant	Reality show (season 5)
2022	Tale e quale show	Contestant	Talent show (season 12)
