= È arrivata la felicità =

- Genre: Comedy-drama
- Created by: Stefano Bises; Ivan Cotroneo; Monica Rametta
- Starring: Claudio Santamaria; Claudia Pandolfi; Ettore Bassi; Giulia Bevilacqua; Myriam Catania; Ninetto Davoli; Federica De Cola; Edwige Fenech; Andrea Lintozzi Senneca; Paolo Mazzarelli; Caterina Murino; Alessandro Roja; Lunetta Savino; Simona Tabasco; Massimo Wertmuller; Valeria Flore
- Country of origin: Italy
- Original language: Italian
- No. of seasons: 2
- No. of episodes: 48

Production
- Producer: Verdiana Bixio
- Running time: 50 minutes

Original release
- Network: Rai 1
- Release: October 8, 2015 – April 29, 2018

Related
- Un medico in famiglia Una grande famiglia Tutti pazzi per amore

È arrivata la felicità is an Italian television comedy-drama series created by Stefano Bises, Ivan Cotroneo, Monica Rametta; and produced by Publispei and Rai Fiction. The setting of the show are Aventino and Testaccio, two districts in Rome.

== Cast and characters ==
=== Main ===
- Claudio Santamaria as Orlando Mieli
- Claudia Pandolfi as Angelica Camilli
- Giulia Bevilacqua as Valeria Camili – sister of Angelica and partner of Rita Nardelli

== Ratings ==
=== Italy ===
TV Season	Season	Date	Timeslot	No. Episode	Episode Title	Viewers on Rai 1	Share
2015	1	October 8, 2015	9.30 PM	01; 02	Quando ci siamo incontrati (e anche odiati); Quando mi hai abbracciata	4,788,000	19.24%
2015	1	October 15, 2015	9.30 PM	03; 04	Quando abbiamo stretto il patto Quando ti ho fatto uscire con Nunzia		
2015	1	October 22, 2015	9.30 PM	05; 06	Quando non capivo cosa avessi Quando hai raccontato il tuo segreto		
2015	1	October 29, 2015	9.30 PM	07; 08	Quando mi hai tirato uno schiaffo Quando è tornato Gianluca		
2015	1	November 5, 2015	9.30 PM	09; 10			
2015	1	November 5, 2015	9.30 PM	11; 12			
2015	1	November 12, 2015	9.30 PM	13; 14			
2015	1	November 19, 2015	9.30 PM	15; 16			
2015	1	November 26, 2015	9.30 PM	17; 18			
2015	1	December 3, 2015	9.30 PM	19; 20			
2015	1	December 10, 2015	9.30 PM	21; 22			
2015	1	December 17, 2015	9.30 PM	23; 24			
