= Camillo Boito =

Italian architect and engineer, and a noted art critic, art historian and novelist

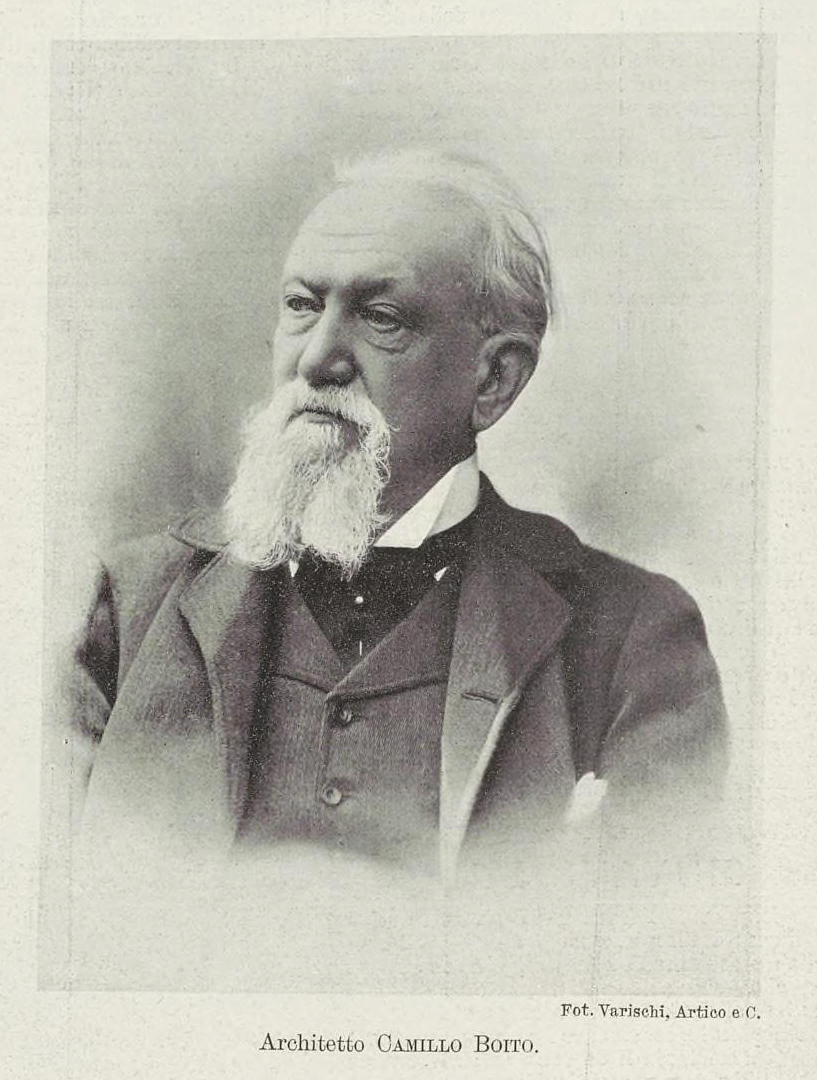
- Born: 30 October 1836; Rome
- Died: 28 June 1914 (aged 77); Milan, Kingdom of Italy
- Education: University of Padua
- Occupations: short story writer, essayst
- Writing career
- Genres: short story, essay
- Notable work: Senso
- Literary movement: Scapigliatura - Lombard line

Signature
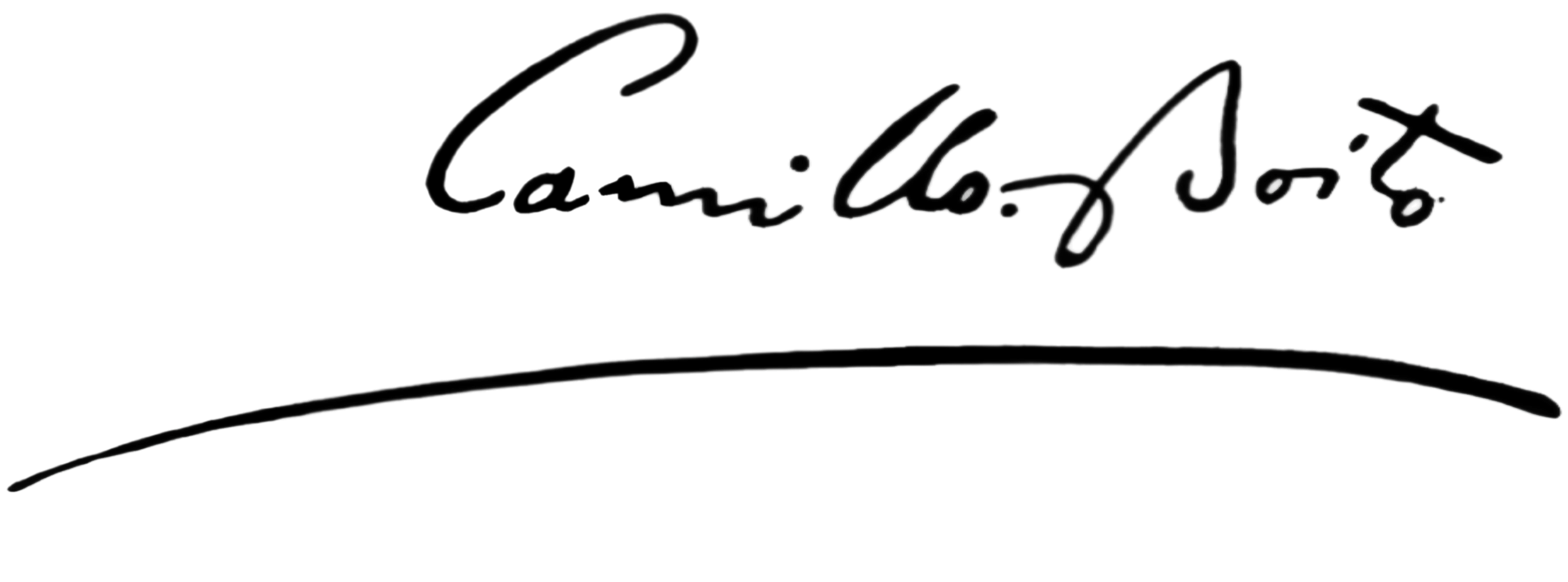

Camillo Boito (Italian pronunciation: [kaˈmillo ˈbɔito]; 30 October 1836 – 28 June 1914) was an Italian architect and engineer, and a noted art critic, art historian and novelist. He was the brother of Arrigo Boito, the friend and librettist of the Italian composer Giuseppe Verdi.

Boito was an important figure in many ways in the cultural life of Italy, and especially Milan, in the second half of the 19th century. He not only taught at the Brera Academy and the Istituto tecnico superiore for nearly 50 years but also took part in competitions (both as competitor and adjudicator), wrote articles on architecture and restoration for newspapers and periodicals, as well as numerous reports for private individuals and the government, and was active in numerous professional associations. He also served on numerous commissions, particularly after his appointment as Director of the Brera Academy in 1897.

== Biography ==
=== Training and architectural career ===
Boito was born in Rome, the son of an Italian painter of miniatures. His mother was of Polish ancestry. He entered the Accademia di Belle Arti in Venice in 1850 and won a prize there in 1852. During his time there, he was influenced by Pietro Selvatico Estense, an architect who championed the study of medieval art in Italy.

In 1852 he was awarded a prize by the Accademia di Belle Arti. In 1854 he entered the Studio Matematico at the University of Padua, and in 1855 he qualified as a professional architect. In 1856 he began teaching at the Accademia in Venice, but his agitation against the Austrian domination pressured him to leave Venice and move to Tuscany. In Florence he began to write for the journal lo Spettatore edited by Celestino Bianchi.

Around this time he also became involved with cultural and social circles in Milan. His mother, who was Polish, and his brother, the librettist and composer Arrigo Boito (1842–1918), moved there in 1854 in order for Arrigo to attend Milan Conservatory, and in 1855 Camillo exhibited some of his designs at the Brera Academy. He also began publishing articles in such Milanese journals as Politecnico, Nuova Antologia and Crepuscolo. In November 1860 he was appointed Professor of Higher Architecture at the Brera Academy, where he taught until 1908.

Among the many artistic associations with which Boito became involved in Milan was the Scapigliatura movement, which sought to revitalize and reform the arts, especially literature. Under the influence of the movement he wrote many short stories, published as Storielle vane (Milan, 1876) and Senso: Nuove storielle vane (Milan, 1883).

Boito's first works as an architect in Lombardy were the chapels (1865) forming the perimeter of the cemetery at Gallarate, where he also built the Ponti Mausoleum. These reflect the influence of central Europe, which he visited during the trips he made to his mother's native Poland. He continued to have links with the Veneto region, however: in 1873 he won the competition for the Palazzo delle Debite in Padua.

During his extensive work restoring ancient buildings, he tried to reconcile the conflicting views of his contemporaries on architectural restoration, notably those of Eugène Viollet-le-Duc and John Ruskin. This reconciliation of ideas was presented at the III Conference of Architects and Civil Engineers of Rome in 1883 in a document later to be known as the "Prima Carta del Restauro" or the Charter of Restoration. This inaugural charter provided a set of principles for the restoration and conservation of monuments. In his 1893 set of dialogues on historic monuments, he develops this into eight points to be taken into consideration in the restoration of historical monuments:

1. The differentiation of style between new and old parts of a building.
2. The differentiation in building materials between the new and the old.
3. Suppression of moldings and decorative elements in new fabric placed in a historical building.
4. Exhibition in a nearby place of any material parts of a historical building that were removed during the process of restoration.
5. Inscription of the date (or a conventional symbol) on new fabric in a historical building.
6. Descriptive epigraph of the restoration work done attached to the monument.
7. Registration and description with photographs of the different phases of restoration. This register should remain in the monument or in a nearby public place. This requirement may be substituted by publication of this material.
8. Visual notoriety of the restoration work done.

The concern was for maintaining authenticity in terms of the identification of original materials. At the same time, the intention was to promote a "scientific" attitude toward restoration. Boito's principles were well accepted and inspired modern legislation on restoration of historical monuments in several countries.

Boito is perhaps most famous for his restoration of the Church and Campanile of Santi Maria e Donato at Murano, inspired by the theories and techniques of Viollet-Le-Duc. He also worked on the Porta Ticinese in Milan between 1856–1858 and famed Basilica of Saint Anthony in Padua in 1899. He designed the Cemetery of Gallarate.

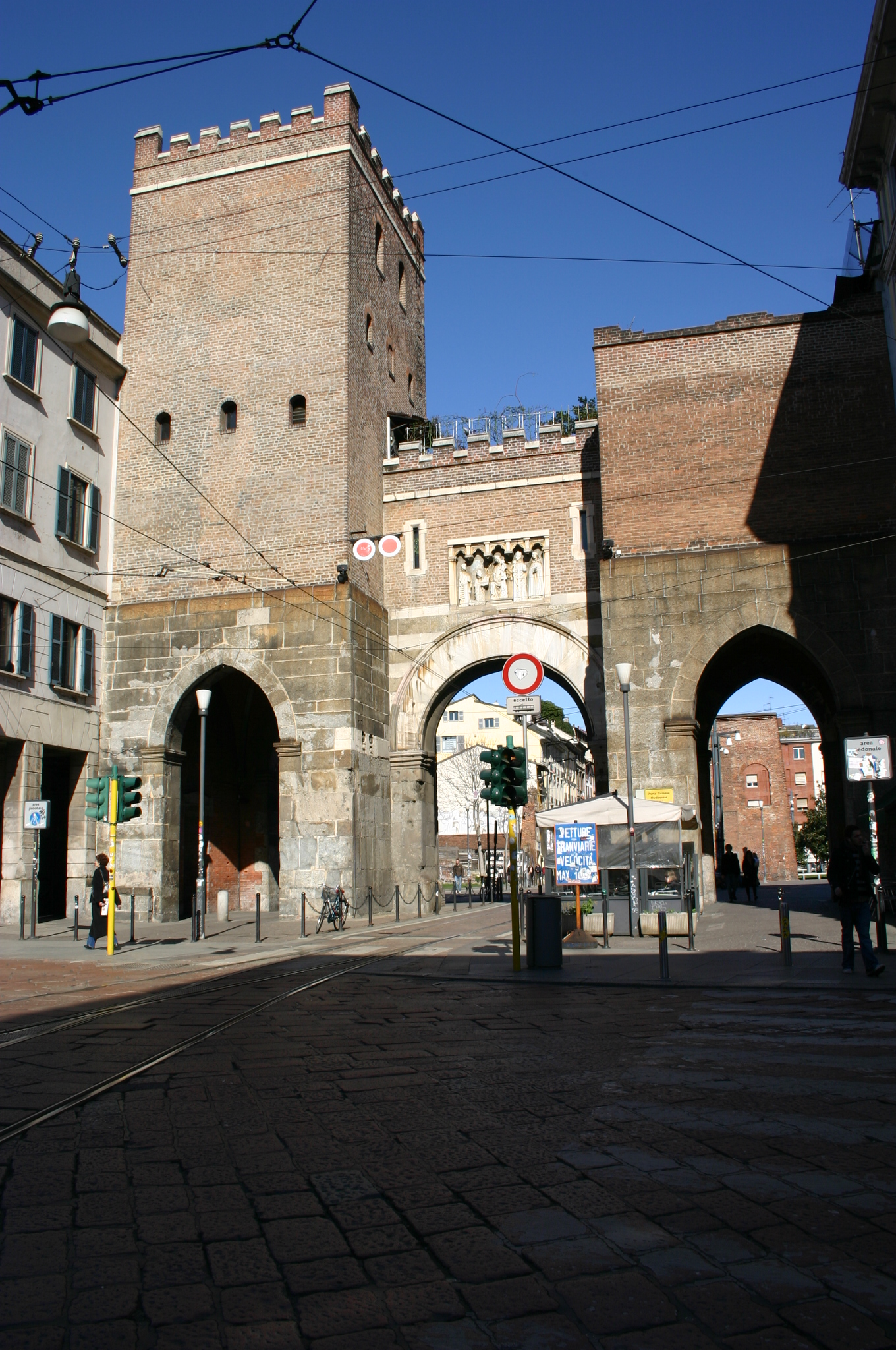
Gothic restoration of Porta Ticinese in Milan.

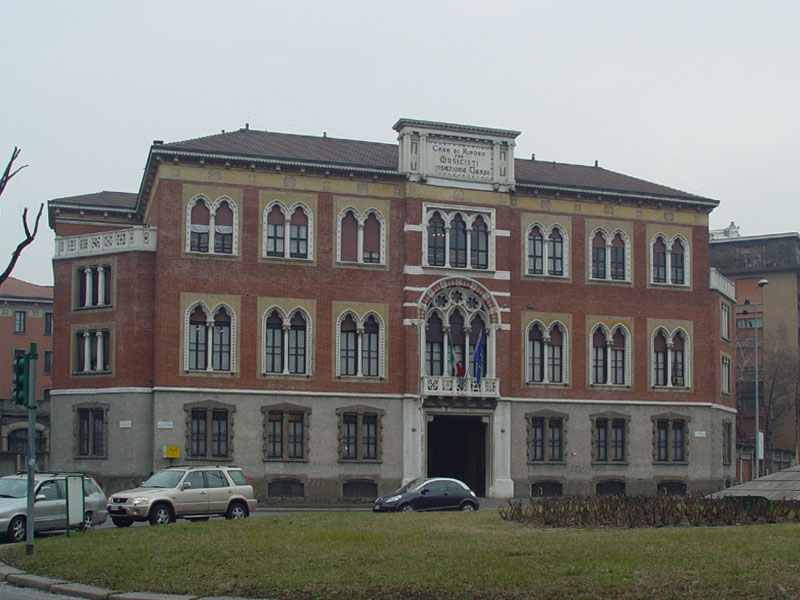
Casa di Riposo per Musicisti, Milan

Other architectural designs include Gallarate Hospital (in Gallarate, Italy) and a school in Milan. His most famous building in Milan is the Casa di Riposo per Musicisti which was built 1895 - 99. It was financed by the composer Giuseppe Verdi and serves as a rest home for retired musicians, and as a memorial for the composer, who is buried in the crypt of the chapel there. In the early 1900s, Boito helped shape Italian laws protecting historical monuments.

Boito died in Milan in 1914.

=== Literary works ===
Boito also wrote several collections of short stories, including a psychological horror short story titled "A Christmas Eve", a tale of incestuous obsession and necrophilia, which bears a striking similarity to Edgar Allan Poe's "Berenice." A short film adaptation was released in 2012.

Around 1882 he wrote his most famous novella, Senso, a disturbing tale of sexual decadence. In 1954, Senso was memorably adapted for the screen by Italian director Luchino Visconti and then, later, in 2002 into a more sexually disturbing adaptation by Tinto Brass.

Another story, "Un corpo" (also dealing with themes of sexual decadence and necrophilia), was adapted into an opera of the same title by the Greek composer Kharálampos Goyós, commissioned and premiered by the Experimental Stage of the Greek National Opera in 2008.

Arrigo Boito, Camillo's younger brother, was a noted poet, composer and the author of the libretti for Giuseppe Verdi's last two great operas, Otello and Falstaff.

== See also ==
- Scapigliatura
- Senso
- Lombard line
