= Istituto tecnico superiore =

Italian educational institution

An Istituto tecnico superiore (abbreviated ITS – Higher Technical Institute) is an Italian tertiary educational institution. They were established in 2008, and are modelled on the Fachhochschule system of Germany. Programs have a duration of two or three years, and require a high school degree for access.

Course areas include business support services, agricultural and food industries, construction, mechanical engineering, and fashion. The northern region of Lombardy hosts the largest number of institutes.

== See also ==
- University Institutes of Technology
