= Gabriel Garko =

Italian actor and fashion model

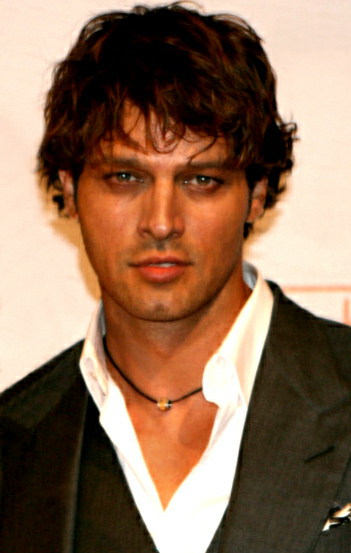
- Gabriel Garko in Roma Fiction Fest (2009)
- Born: Dario Oliviero; 12 July 1972 (age 53); Turin, Italy
- Occupations: Actor; model

Dario Oliviero (born 12 July 1972), better known by his stage name Gabriel Garko, is an Italian actor and former fashion model. Actor in both film and television, he has appeared mainly on the small screen. He started his career at the end of the 1990s but achieved a breakthrough in 2006 with the television drama L'onore e il rispetto where he plays the mob boss Tonio Fortebracci.

== Background ==
Born in Turin, Piedmont, Italy to a Venetian father and Sicilian mother, Garko was raised in the nearby suburb of Settimo Torinese. His film credits include Callas Forever (2002), and L'onore e il rispetto (2006), a television mini-series where he portrayed a ruthless fictitious Mafia boss Tonio Fortebracci. In Tinto Brass' Senso '45, he appears full-frontal nude in a scene with lead actress Anna Galiena. He starred alongside actresses Serena Autieri and Manuela Arcuri. In 2010, he starred in the main role of Nito Valdi in another mini-series Il peccato e la vergogna, which was set in Italy during World War II. Manuela Arcuri was his co-star in this series as well. In 2011, he starred in the television mini-series Viso d'angelo, a police thriller.

He currently lives in Zagarolo. Garko is the owner of a riding school; and enjoys bodybuilding, swimming, horse riding and skiing. He came out as bisexual in September 2020.

== Filmography ==
Films
Year	Title	Role
1996	Una donna in fuga	Masino
1998	Paparazzi	Gabriel
2001	The Ignorant Fairies	Ernesto
2002	Callas Forever	Marco
2002	Senso '45	Helmut Schultz
2007	A Beautiful Wife	Andrea
2008	Aspettando il sole	Samuel
2014	Misunderstood	Guido
2016	Poveri ma ricchi	Himself

Television
Year	Title	Role	Notes
1991	Vita coi figli	Gabriel	Miniseries
1993	Scherzi a parte	Himself	Member of the program's dance team
1996	La signora della città	Young man	Television film
1998	Angelo nero	Jack Altieri	Miniseries
1999	Tre stelle	Massimo del Monte	Miniseries
1999	Il morso del serpente	Angelo Berti	Television film
2001	Occhi verde veleno	Carlo Roversi	Television film
2001–2003	Il bello delle donne	Roberto "Bobo" de Contris	Main role; 36 episodes
2005	I colori della Vita	Luca	Miniseries
2006–2017	L'onore e il rispetto	Antonio "Tonio" Fortebracci	Lead role; 32 episodes
2008	Io ti assolvo	Father Francesco	Television film
2008	Il sangue e la rosa	Rocco Riboni	Miniseries
2010	Caldo criminale	Valerio Valli	Television film
2010–2014	Il peccato e la vergogna	Nito Valdi	Co-lead role; 16 episodes
2011	Sangue caldo	Arthuro La Paglia	Main role; 6 episodes
2011	Viso d'angelo	Inspector Roberto Parisi	Miniseries
2014	Rodolfo Valentino: La Leggenda	Rudolph Valentino	Miniseries
2016	Sanremo Music Festival 2016	Himself	Host
2016	Non è stato mio figlio	Andrea Geraldi	Main role; 8 episodes
2017	Il bello delle donne... Alcuni anni dopo	Roberto "Bobo" de Contris	Episode: "Ottava Puntata"
2017	Miss Italia 2017	Himself	Judge
2022	Ballando con le Stelle	Himself	Contestant (season 17)
2024	Se potessi dirti addio	Marcello	Upcoming TV series
