= Villa Godi =

UNESCO World Heritage Site
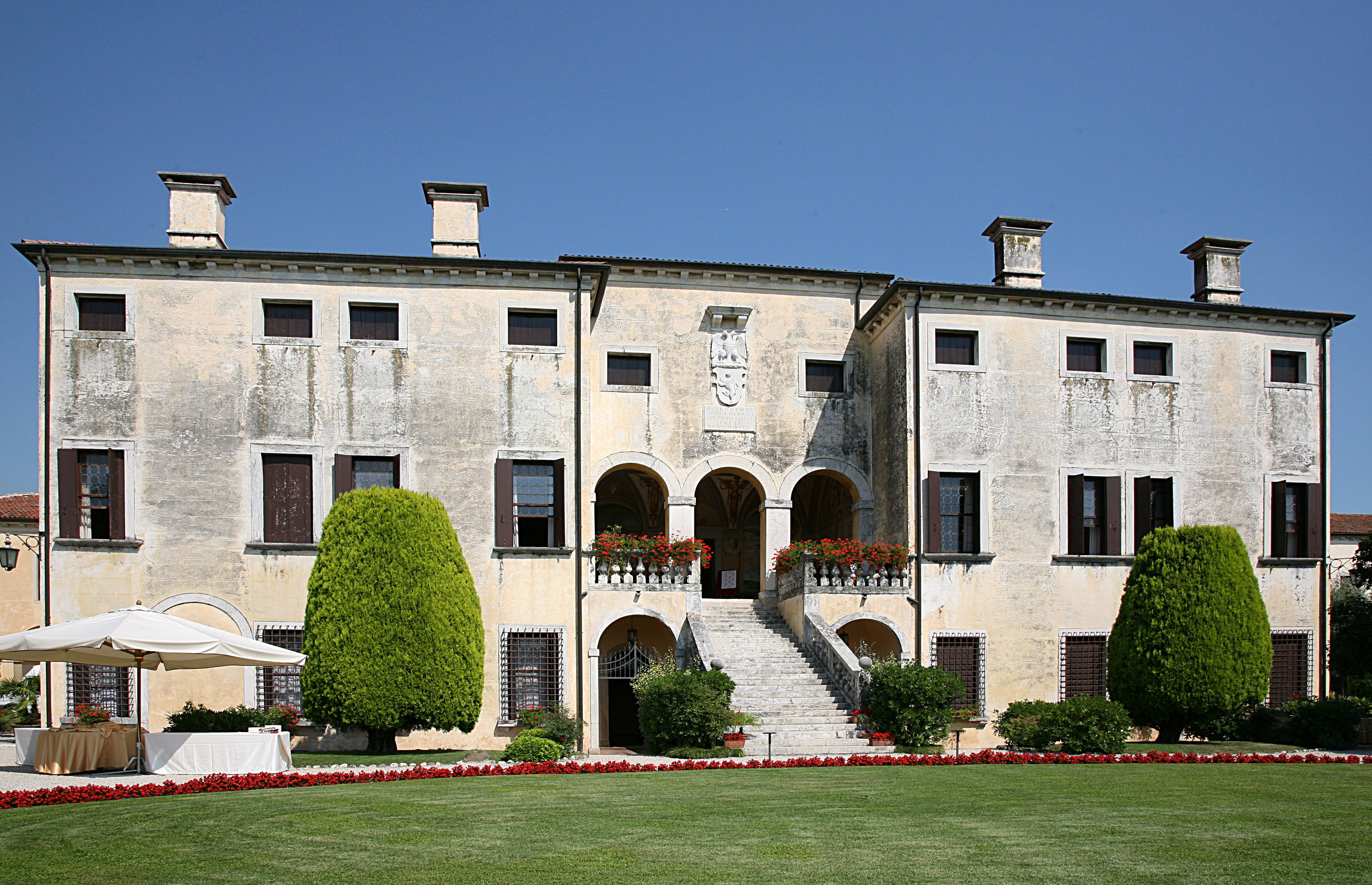

- Location within Veneto Location within Italy
- Location: Lugo di Vicenza, Province of Vicenza, Veneto, Italy
- Part of: City of Vicenza and the Palladian Villas of the Veneto
- Criteria: Cultural: (i), (ii)
- Reference: 712bis-024
- Inscription: 1994 (18th Session)
- Extensions: 1996
- Area: 2.78 ha (6.9 acres)
- Website: www.villagodi.com/english
- Coordinates: 45°44′44″N 11°32′05″E

Villa Godi is a patrician villa in Lugo di Vicenza, Veneto, northern Italy. It was one of the first projects by Italian Renaissance architect Andrea Palladio, as attested in his monograph I quattro libri dell'architettura. The work was commissioned by the brothers Girolamo, Pietro and Marcantonio Godi, started in 1537 and concluded in 1542, with later modifications to the rear entry and gardens.

The villa has been designated by UNESCO as part of the World Heritage Site "City of Vicenza and the Palladian Villas of the Veneto". The villa and extensive gardens are open to the public in the afternoon, year round. The building also houses a museum of archeology in the basement, with hundreds of fossils of plant and animal life in the region. Its large park was laid out in the 19th century and was used as a film location for Senso.

== Architecture ==
The building lacks of ornamentation usually associated with Palladio's mature work, and for the refined, symmetrical proportions of the façade and massing of the structure. The plan is arranged with suites of apartments arranged symmetrically on each side of the main sala and a recessed entry loggia. The plan published in I quattro libri dell'architettura twenty-eight years after the building's completion is probably a revision of Palladio's original design and includes an extensive complex of farm buildings, which are not part of the actual realisation.

This early work by Palladio still demonstrates characteristics of the architecture of his time. A harmonic unity of landscape and architecture does not yet seem to have been an aspiration. The building is a massive block consisting of three distinct parts. The public space of the reception area (the sala) is clearly distinguished from the domestic living areas and the ensemble does not present a unified appearance. The flight of entrance steps is flanked by balusters and its width corresponds to the middle arch of the arcade of the loggia.

Villa Godi from I quattro libri dell'architettura (1570)

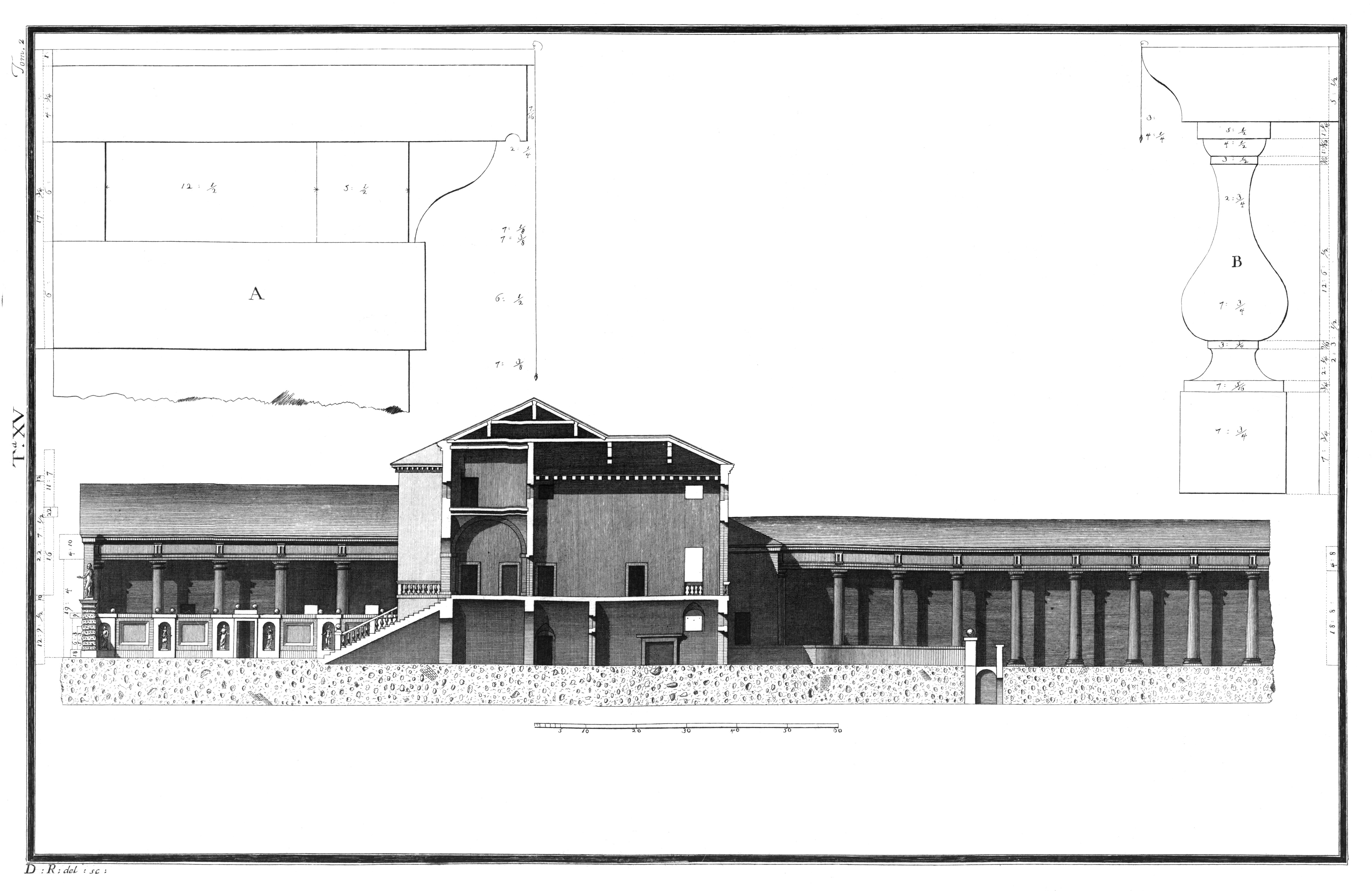
Cross section (Ottavio Bertotti Scamozzi, 1778)

== Frescoes ==
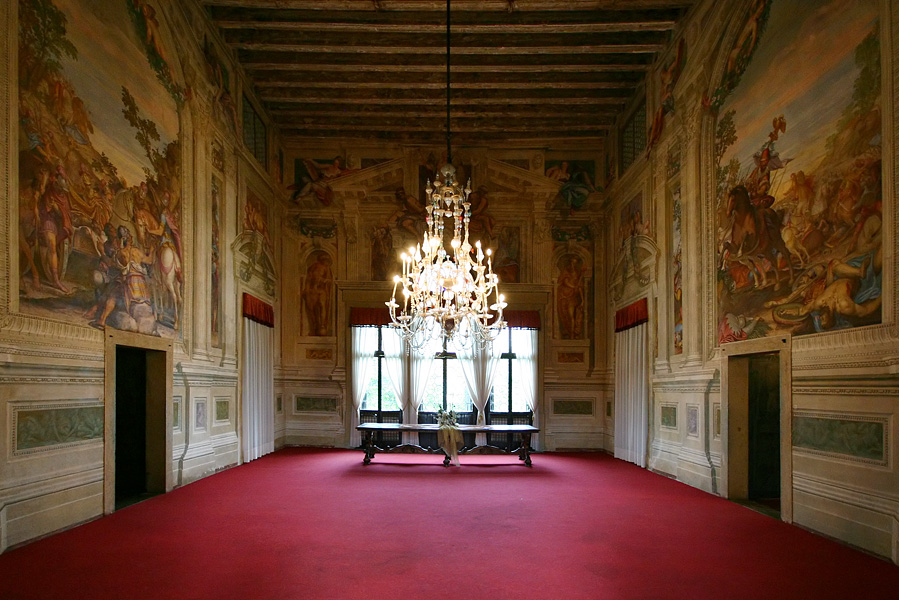
Salon in the centre of the villa

The interior was decorated with frescoes initially by Gualtiero Padovano, and later by Giovanni Battista Zelotti and Battista del Moro. Their "Hall of the Muses" includes depictions of caryatids within a composition of muses and poets in Arcadian landscapes. Ruins of a Greek temple also form the backdrop for the depiction of Olympian gods. This is followed by symbols of peace and justice, a common theme in Venetian villas following the War of the League of Cambrai and the desire for a new Pax Venetiana, or great peace within the Republic of Venice.

== Gallery ==
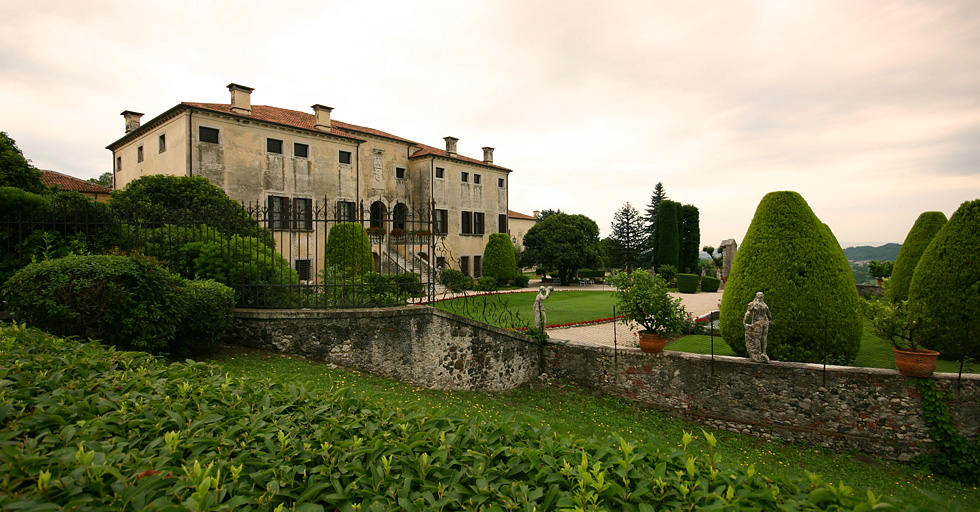

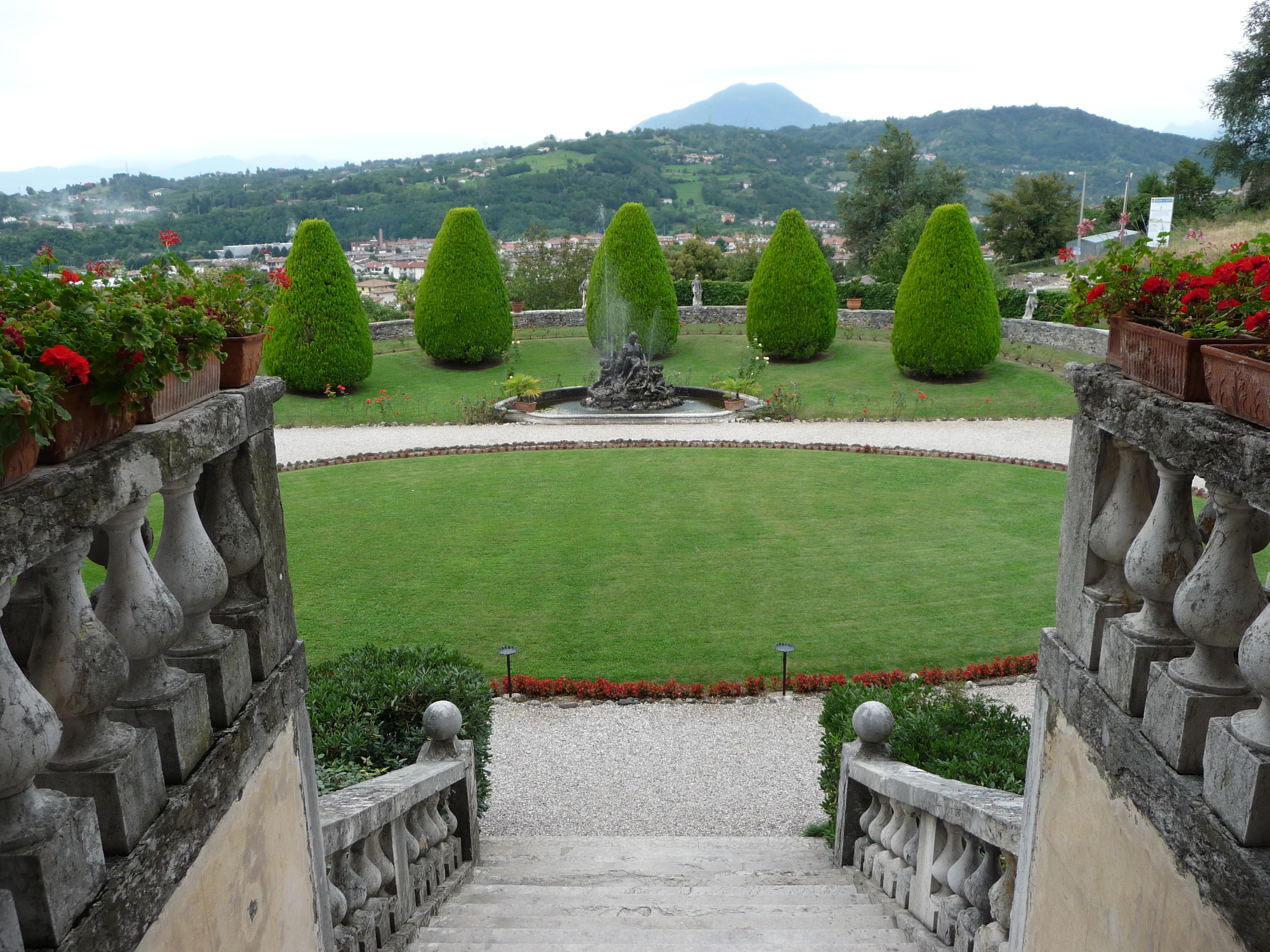

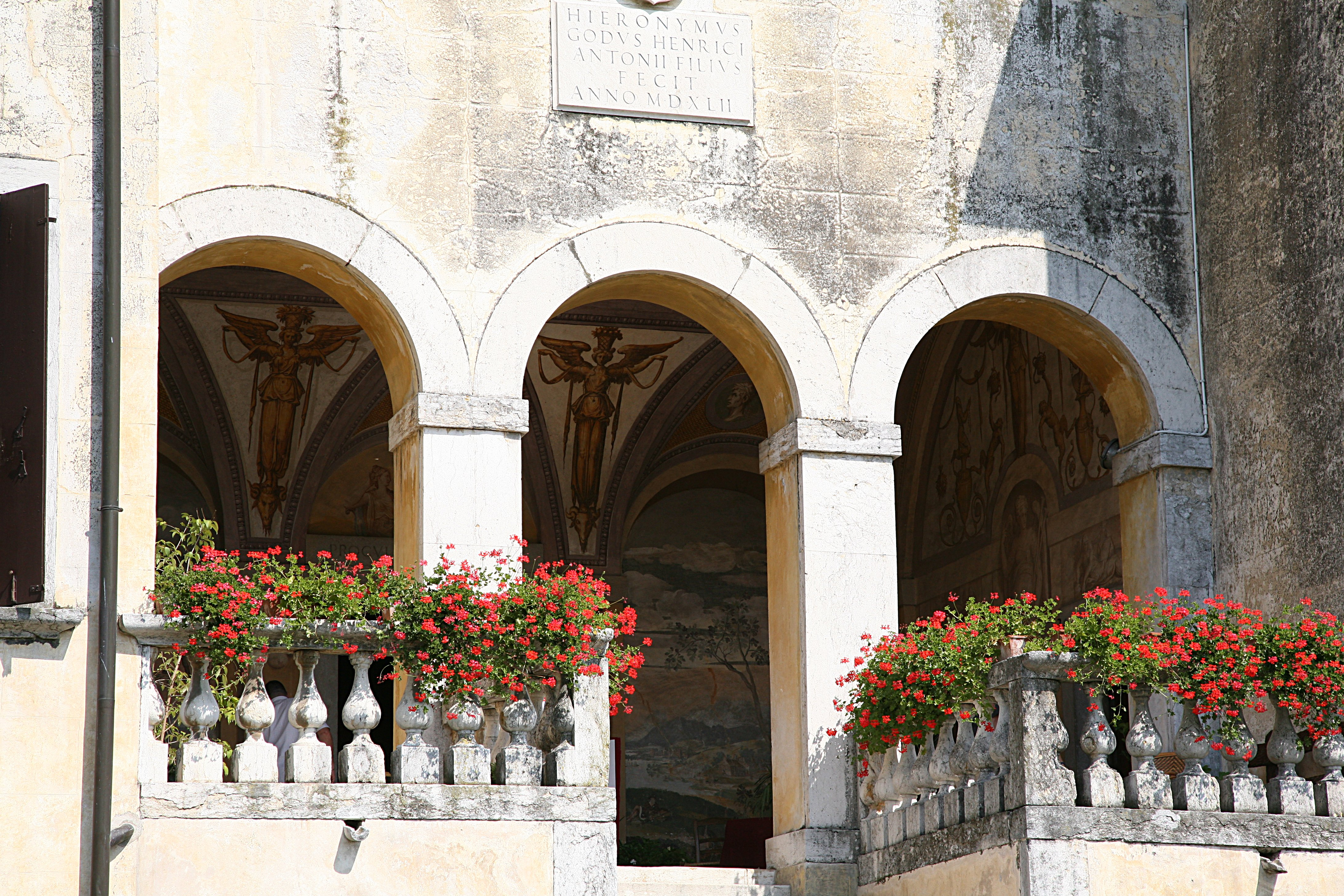
The loggia

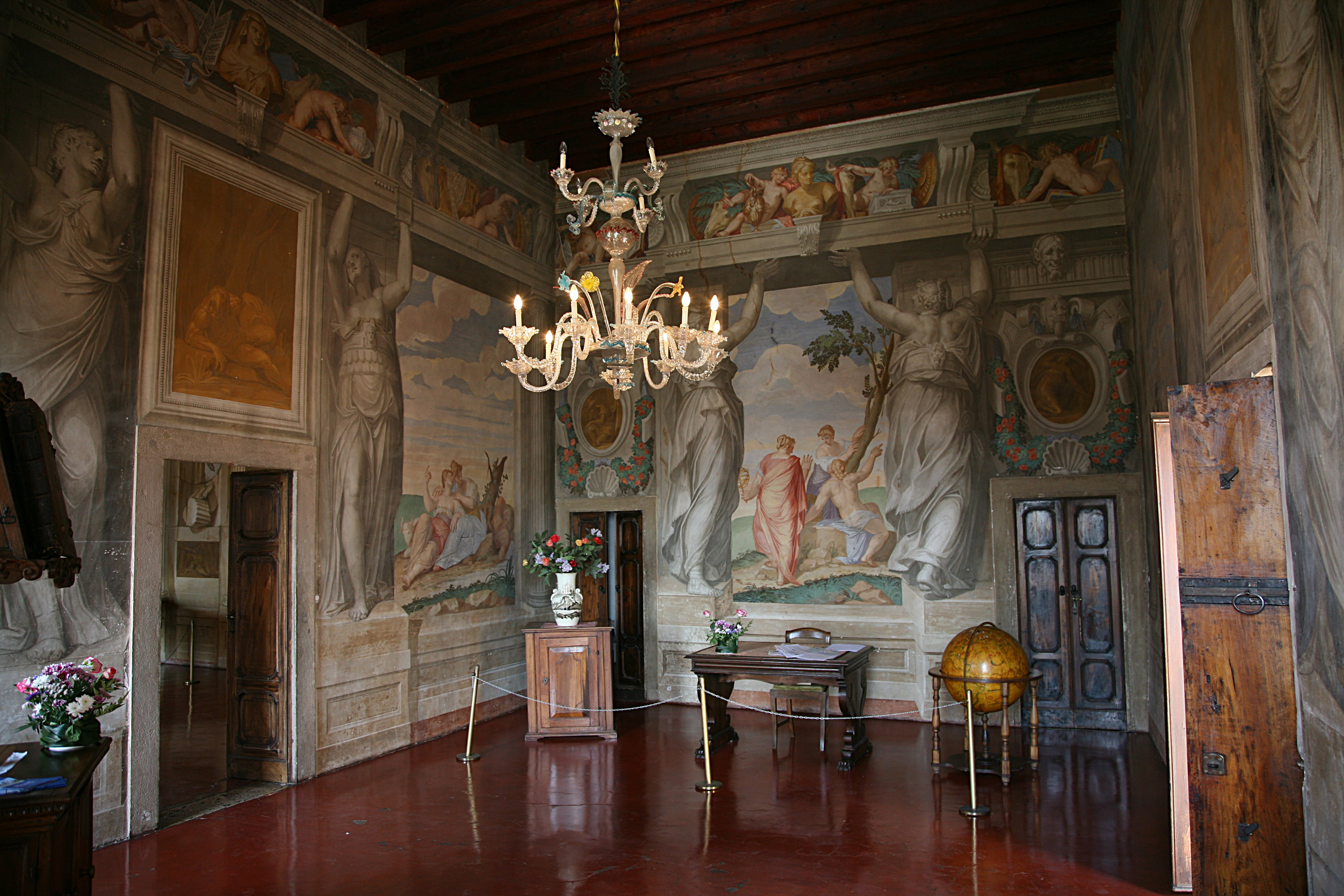

== See also ==
- Palladian architecture
- Palladian Villas of the Veneto

== Sources ==
- Sören Fischer, Das Landschaftsbild als gerahmter Ausblick in den venezianischen Villen des 16. Jahrhunderts - Sustris, Padovano, Veronese, Palladio und die illusionistische Landschaftsmalerei, Petersberg 2014, pp. 100–110, 144–158. ISBN 978-3-86568-847-7 Link
