= Anna Galiena =

Italian actress

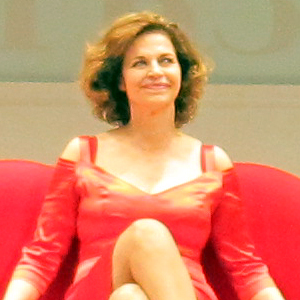
- Galiena in 2013
- Born: 22 December 1949 (age 76); Rome, Italy
- Occupation: Actress
- Years active: 1981–present

Anna Galiena (born 22 December 1949) is an Italian actress, best known to English-speaking audiences for her appearances in Le Mari de la coiffeuse (1990), Jamón jamón (1992), Being Human (1994) and Senso '45 (2002).

== Career ==
She was born in a family that appreciated art, but discouraged the pursuit of artistic careers. When she was 19 she left home and her University studies and moved to Ciociaria with a group of friends to act on stage. In 1974 she left Italy, too and lived in Toronto for a few years, before flying to New York in the late ‘70s to try her luck at acting. After her first audition she landed the leading role in an Off-Broadway production of “Romeo and Juliet”. In New York she trained at Actors' Studios and worked on stage: she played Nina in The Seagull appeared in Richard III with the American Shakespeare Company, shared the stage with Michael Moriarty while performing Uncle Vanya at The Public Theater and took part in The Chain, the playwriting debut of Elia Kazan. In 1984 she moved back to Italy where she continued to work on stage playing the role of Natasha in Three Sisters directed by Otomar Krejca at the Teatro Stabile di Genova. She also worked in film and, briefly, on television.

In 1990 she was brought to international attention by her starring role in the French film The Hairdresser's Husband. She went on to appear in Bigas Luna's Jamón, jamón in 1992.

Galiena made her mainstream Hollywood debut in the Bill Forsyth-directed Being Human (1994), starring Robin Williams. Since then, she has worked in European cinema, with over 50 films and many television appearances to her credit.

She was a member of jury at the Berlin International Film Festival in 2003.

In 2007 she was a member of the jury at the 29th Moscow International Film Festival.

== Personal life ==
Galiena has been married twice, with an American named John and Frenchman Philippe Langlet. She speaks Italian, English, French, and Spanish. In Being Human she speaks Friulian, a Romance language spoken in north-east Italy.

== Selected filmography ==
- Nothing Underneath (1985)
- Sweets from a Stranger (1987)
- Farewell Moscow (1987)
- Hotel Colonial (1987)
- La fée carabine (1988)
- Willy Signori e vengo da lontano (1989)
- The Hairdresser's Husband (1990)
- Quiet Days in Clichy (1990)
- Jamón Jamón (1992)
- L'Atlantide (1992)
- No Skin (1993)
- The Great Pumpkin (1993)
- Being Human (1994)
- Mario and the Magician (1994)
- Moses (1995)
- School (1995)
- Three Lives and Only One Death (1996)
- The Leading Man (1996)
- 3 (1996)
- Unpredictable Nature of the River (1996)
- My Brother's Gun (1997)
- Excellent Cadavers (1999)
- But Forever in My Mind (1999)
- Off Key (2001)
- Senso '45 (2002)
- The Tulse Luper Suitcases (2003)
- The Citadel (2003)
- Guardians of the Clouds (2004)
- Fade to Black (2006)
- Virgin Territory (2007)
- Flying Lessons (2007)
- Ultimatum (2009)
- Un Amore di Strega (2009)
- Stay Away from Me (2013)
- My Summer in Provence (2014)
- You Can't Save Yourself Alone (2015)
- Like Crazy (2016)
- An Almost Ordinary Summer (2019)
- Improvvisamente Natale (2022)
- Felicità (2023)
- Giorni felici (2024)
- Still Sexy (2026)
