= 68th David di Donatello =

2023 Italian film awards

- Date: 10 May 2023
- Site: Cinecittà, Rome, Italy
- Hosted by: Carlo Conti; Matilde Gioli

Highlights
- Best Picture: The Eight Mountains
- Most awards: The Eight Mountains; Exterior Night; Strangeness (4)
- Most nominations: Exterior Night (18)

Television coverage
- Network: Rai 1
- Duration: 2 hours, 24 minutes

The 68th David di Donatello ceremony, honored the achievement in Italian cinema, was held on 10 May 2023 at the Cinecittà, Rome, Italy. It was hosted by presenter Carlo Conti and actress Matilde Gioli.

Drama film The Eight Mountains brought home the award for Best Film, along with another three. It tied with Exterior Night and Strangeness with the most awarded films of the night. Other winners include Caravaggio's Shadow, Dry, and September with two, Burning Hearts, The Circle, The Dependent Variables, The Fabelmans, Il pataffio, and Nostalgia with one.

== Winners and nominees ==
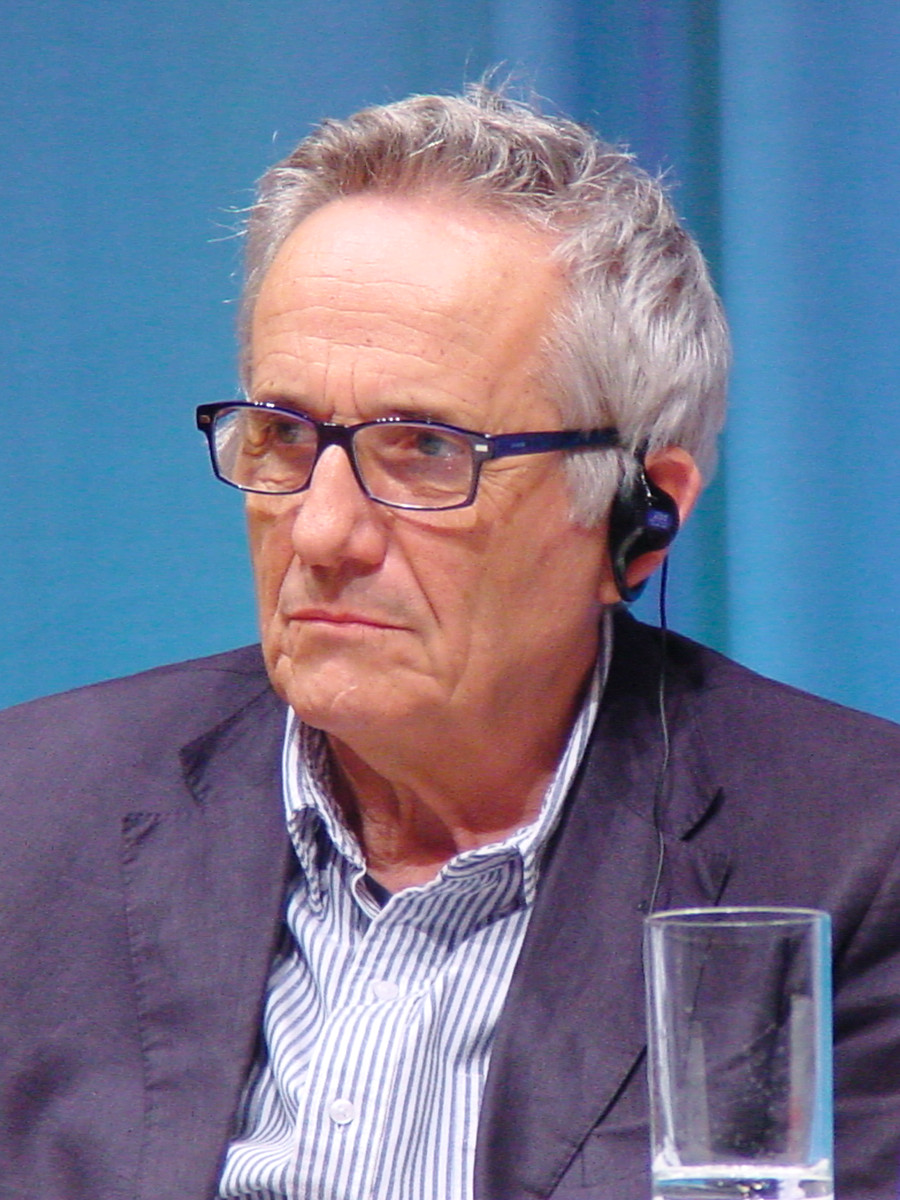
Marco Bellocchio, Best Director winner

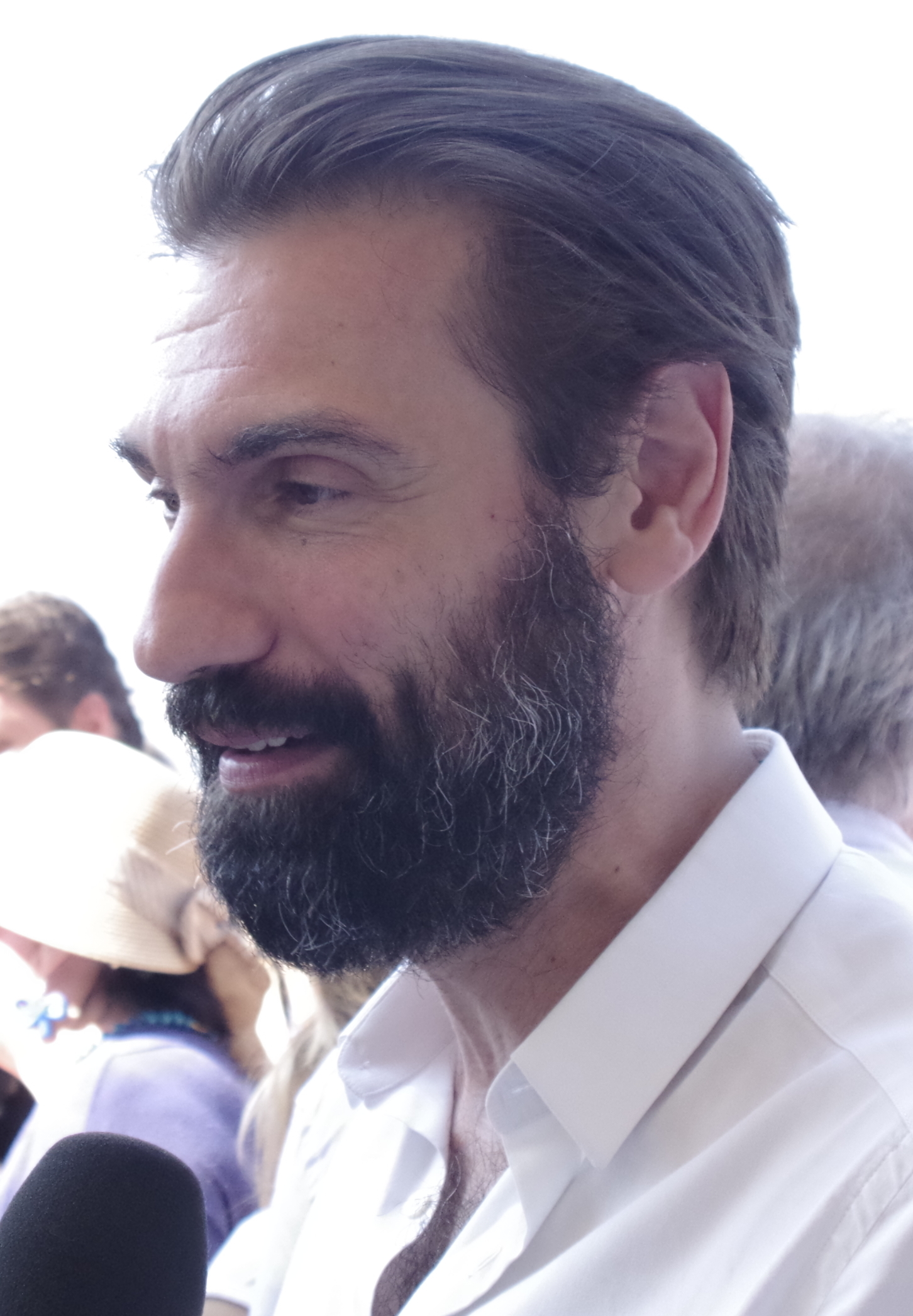
Fabrizio Gifuni, Best Actor winner

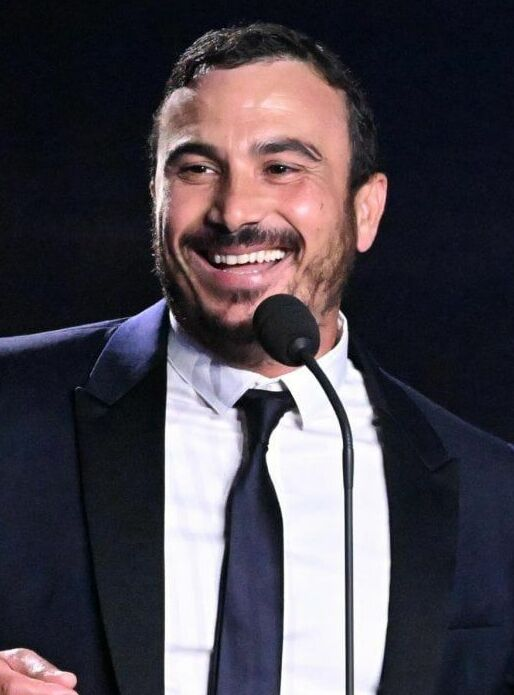
Francesco Di Leva, Best Supporting Actor winner

The nominations were announced on 30 March 2023. Exterior Night received the most nominations with eighteen, followed by The Eight Mountains and Strangeness with fourteen.

Winners are listed first, highlighted in boldface, and indicated with a double dagger (‡).

| **Best Film**: **The Eight Mountains – Felix van Groeningen and Charlotte Vandermeersch, directors**‡; Exterior Night – Marco Bellocchio, director; Lord of the Ants – Gianni Amelio, director; Nostalgia – Mario Martone, director; Strangeness – Roberto Andò, director | **Best Producer**: **Strangeness – Angelo Barbagallo and Attilio De Razza, producers; Bibi Film, Tramp Limited, Medusa Film, and Rai Cinema, production companies**‡; The Eight Mountains – Mario Gianani and Lorenzo Gangarossa, producers; Wildside, Rufus, Menuetto, Pyramide Productions, Vision Distribution, Elastic, Canal+, Cine+, and Sky Italia, production companies; Exterior Night – Lorenzo Mieli and Simone Gattoni, producers; The Apartment and Kavac Film, production companies; Nostalgia – Maria Carolina Terzi, Luciano Stella, Carlo Stella, Roberto Sessa, and Angelo Laudisa, producers; Medusa Film, Mad Entertainment, Picomedia, and Rosebud Entertainment Pictures, production companies; Princess – Carla Altieri, Roberto De Paolis, Nicola Giuliano, Francesca Cima, Carlotta Calori, and Viola Prestieri, producers; Young Films, Indigo Film, and Rai Cinema, production companies |
| **Best Director**: **Marco Bellocchio – Exterior Night**‡; Gianni Amelio – Lord of the Ants; Roberto Andò – Strangeness; Mario Martone – Nostalgia; Felix van Groeningen and Charlotte Vandermeersch – The Eight Mountains | **Best Directorial Debut**: **Giulia Steigerwalt – September**‡; Carolina Cavalli – Amanda; Niccolò Falsetti – Margins; Vincenzo Pirrotta – The Bone Breakers; Jasmine Trinca – Marcel! |
| **Best Actor**: **Fabrizio Gifuni – Exterior Night as Aldo Moro**‡; Alessandro Borghi – The Eight Mountains as Bruno; Ficarra e Picone – Strangeness as Sebastiano "Bastiano" Vella and Onofrio "Nofrio" Principato; Luigi Lo Cascio – Lord of the Ants as Aldo Braibanti; Luca Marinelli – The Eight Mountains as Pietro | **Best Actress**: **Barbara Ronchi – September as Francesca**‡; Margherita Buy – Exterior Night as Eleonora Chiavarelli; Penélope Cruz – L'immensità as Clara; Claudia Pandolfi – Dry as Sara; Benedetta Porcaroli – Amanda as Amanda |
| **Best Supporting Actor**: **Francesco Di Leva – Nostalgia as Father Luigi Rega**‡; Elio Germano – Lord of the Ants as Ennio Scribani; Fausto Russo Alesi – Exterior Night as Francesco Cossiga; Toni Servillo – Exterior Night as Pope Paul VI; Filippo Timi – The Eight Mountains as Giovanni | **Best Supporting Actress**: **Emanuela Fanelli – Dry as Raffaella Zarate**‡; Giulia Andò – Strangeness as Santina Vella; Daniela Marra – Exterior Night as Adriana Faranda; Giovanna Mezzogiorno – Amanda as Viola; Aurora Quattrocchi – Nostalgia as Teresa Lasco |
| **Best Original Screenplay**: **Strangeness – Roberto Andò, Ugo Chiti, and Massimo Gaudioso**‡; Never Too Late for Love – Gianni Di Gregorio and Marco Pettenello; Chiara – Susanna Nicchiarelli; Exterior Night – Marco Bellocchio, Stefano Bises, Ludovica Rampoldi, and Davide Serino; Lord of the Ants – Gianni Amelio, Edoardo Petti, and Federico Fava; L'immensità – Emanuele Crialese, Francesca Manieri, and Vittorio Moroni | **Best Adapted Screenplay**: **The Eight Mountains – Felix van Groeningen and Charlotte Vandermeersch; based on the novel by Paolo Cognetti**‡; Bentu – Salvatore Mereu; based on the novel by Antoni Cossu; Brado – Massimo Gaudioso and Kim Rossi Stuart; based on a story by Stuart; The Hummingbird – Francesca Archibugi, Laura Paolucci, and Francesco Piccolo; based on the novel by Sandro Veronesi; Nostalgia – Mario Martone and Ippolita Di Majo; based on the novel by Ermanno Rea |
| **Best Cinematography**: **The Eight Mountains – Ruben Impens**‡; Exterior Night – Francesco Di Giacomo; I racconti della domenica – Giovanni Mammolotti; Nostalgia – Paolo Carnera; Strangeness – Maurizio Calvesi | **Best Production Design**: **Strangeness – Giada Calabria and Loredana Raffi**‡; Caravaggio's Shadow – Tonino Zera, Maria Grazia Schirippa, and Marco Bagnoli; The Eight Mountains – Massimiliano Nocente and Marcella Galeone; Exterior Night – Andrea Castorina, Marco Martucci, and Laura Casalini; Lord of the Ants – Marta Maffucci and Carolina Ferrara |
| **Best Score**: **Il pataffio – Stefano Bollani**‡; Dry – Franco Piersanti; The Eight Mountains – Daniel Norgren; Exterior Night – Fabio Massimo Capogrosso; Strangeness – Michele Braga and Emanuele Bossi | **Best Original Song**: **"Proiettili (ti mangio il cuore)" from Burning Hearts – Music by Joan Thiele, Elisa, and Emanuele Triglia; Lyrics and Performed by Elodie and Joan Thiele**‡; "Caro amore lontanissimo" from The Hummingbird – Music by Sergio Endrigo; Lyrics by Riccardo Sinigallia; Performed by Marco Mengoni; "Culi culagni" from Il pataffio – Music by Stefano Bollani; Lyrics by Bollani and Luigi Malerba; Performed by Stefano Bollani; "La palude" from Margins – Music and Lyrics by Niccolò Falsetti, Giacomo Pieri, Alessio Ricciotti, and Francesco Turbanti; Performed by Francesco Turbanti, Emanuele Linfatti, and Matteo Creatini; "Se mi vuoi" from Diabolik: Ginko Attacks! – Music, Lyrics, and Performed by Diodato |
| **Best Editing**: **Exterior Night – Francesca Calvelli and Claudio Misantoni**‡; The Eight Mountains – Nico Leunen; Lord of the Ants – Simona Paggi; Nostalgia – Jacopo Quadri; Strangeness – Esmeralda Calabria | **Best Sound**: **The Eight Mountains – Alessandro Palmerini, Alessandro Feletti, and Marco Falloni**‡; Exterior Night – Gaetano Carito, Lilio Rosato, and Nadia Paone; Lord of the Ants – Emanuele Cicconi, Mimmo Granata, and Alberto Bernardi; Nostalgia – Emanuele Cecere, Silvia Moraes, and Giancarlo Rutigliano; Strangeness – Carlo Missidenti, Marta Billingsley, and Gianni Pallotto |
| **Best Costumes**: **Strangeness – Maria Rita Barbera**‡; Caravaggio's Shadow – Carlo Poggioli; Chiara – Massimo Cantini Parrini; Exterior Night – Daria Calvelli; Lord of the Ants – Valentina Monticelli | **Best Visual Effects**: **Dry – Marco Geracitano**‡; Dampyr – Alessio Bertotti and Filippo Robino; Diabolik: Ginko Attacks! – Simone Silvestri and Vito Picchinenna; The Eight Mountains – Rodolfo Migliari; Exterior Night – Massimo Cipollina |
| **Best Make-up**: **Exterior Night – Enrico Iacoponi**‡; Caravaggio's Shadow – Luigi Rocchetti; Dante – Federico Laurenti and Lorenzo Tamburini; The Hummingbird – Paola Gattabrusi and Lorenzo Tamburini; Lord of the Ants – Esmé Sciaroni | **Best Hairstyling**: **Caravaggio's Shadow – Desiree Corridoni**‡; Exterior Night – Alberta Giuliani; L'immensità – Daniela Tartari; Lord of the Ants – Samantha Mura; Strangeness – Rudy Sifari |
| **Best Documentary**: **The Circle – Sophie Chiarello, director**‡; The Crown Shyness – Valentina Bertani, director; In Viaggio: The Travels of Pope Francis – Gianfranco Rosi, director; Kill Me If You Can – Alex Infascelli, director; Wake Me Up at Midnight – Francesco Patierno, director | **Best Short Film**: **The Dependent Variables – Lorenzo Tardella, director**‡; Albertine, Where Are You? – Maria Guidone, director; Ambasciatori – Francesco Romano, director; A Conspiracy Man – Valerio Ferrara, director; His Name Was Cargo – Marco Signoretti, director |
| **Best International Film**: **The Fabelmans – Steven Spielberg, director**‡; Bones and All – Luca Guadagnino, director; Elvis – Baz Luhrmann, director; Licorice Pizza – Paul Thomas Anderson, director; Triangle of Sadness – Ruben Östlund, director | **David Youth Award**: **Caravaggio's Shadow – Michele Placido, director**‡; Corro da te – Riccardo Milani, director; The Eight Mountains – Felix van Groeningen and Charlotte Vandermeersch, directors; The Hummingbird – Francesca Archibugi, director; Strangeness – Roberto Andò, director |
| **Special David Awards**: **Marina Cicogna** (Career David); **Isabella Rossellini**; **Enrico Vanzina** | **David Audience Award**: **Il grande giorno for garnering 1,013,812 spectators** |

== Films with multiple nominations and awards ==
Films that received multiple nominations
| Nominations | Film |
|---|---|
| 18 | Exterior Night |
| 14 | The Eight Mountains |
| 14 | Strangeness |
| 11 | Lord of the Ants |
| 9 | Nostalgia |
| 5 | Caravaggio's Shadow |
| 4 | Dry |
| 4 | The Hummingbird |
| 3 | Amanda |
| 3 | L'immensità |
| 2 | Chiara |
| 2 | Diabolik: Ginko Attacks! |
| 2 | Margins |
| 2 | Il pataffio |
| 2 | September |

Films that received multiple awards
| Awards | Film |
|---|---|
| 4 | The Eight Mountains |
| 4 | Exterior Night |
| 4 | Strangeness |
| 2 | Caravaggio's Shadow |
| 2 | Dry |
| 2 | September |
