= List of Italian films of 2022 =

A list of Italian-produced and co-produced feature films released in Italy in 2022.

== Films ==
| Release | | Title (Domestic title) | Cast & Crew | Distributor | Ref. |
|---|---|---|---|---|---|
| M A Y | 5 | September (Settembre) | Director: Giulia Louise Steigerwalt Cast: Barbara Ronchi, Thony | 01 Distribution | |
| M A Y | 25 | Nostalgia | Director: Mario Martone Cast: Pierfrancesco Favino, Sofia Essaïdi, Francesco Di Leva, Nello Mascia | Medusa Film | |
| M A Y | 26 | Alcarràs | Director: Carla Simón Cast: Jordi Pujol Dolcet, Anna Otin, Xènia Roset, Albert Bosch, Ainet Jounou, Josep Abad, Montse Oró, Carles Cabós, Berta Pipó | I Wonder Pictures | |
| J U N E | 1 | Marcel! | Director: Jasmine Trinca Cast: Alba Rohrwacher, Maayane Conti, Giovanna Ralli | Vision Distribution | |
| J U L Y | 7 | A Breath of Fresh Air (Una boccata d'aria) | Director: Alessio Lauria Cast: Aldo Baglio, Giovanni Calcagno, Lucia Ocone, Ludovica Martino | 01 Distribution | |
| S E P T E M B E R | 8 | Margins | Director: Niccolò Falsetti Cast: Francesco Turbanti, Emanuele Linfatti, Matteo Creatini | | |
| S E P T E M B E R | 8 | Lord of the Ants (Il signore delle formiche) | Director: Gianni Amelio Cast: Luigi Lo Cascio, Elio Germano, Anna Caterina Antonacci, Sara Serraiocco | | |
| S E P T E M B E R | 15 | L'immensità | Director: Emanuele Crialese Cast: Penélope Cruz, Luana Giuliani, Vincenzo Amato | Warner Bros. Pictures | |
| S E P T E M B E R | 29 | Dante | Director: Pupi Avati Cast: Sergio Castellitto, Alessandro Sperduti, Carlotta Gamba, Enrico Lo Verso, Alessandro Haber, Gianni Cavina, Milena Vukotich, Leopoldo Mastelloni, Paolo Graziosi | | |
| S E P T E M B E R | 29 | Dry (Siccità) | Director: Paolo Virzì Cast: Valerio Mastandrea, Silvio Orlando, Elena Lietti, Tommaso Ragno, Claudia Pandolfi, Vinicio Marchioni, Monica Bellucci, Diego Ribon, Max Tortora, Emanuela Fanelli, Gabriel Montesi, Sara Serraiocco | | |
| O C T O B E R | 5 | Jumping from High Places (Per lanciarsi dalle stelle) | Director: Andrea Jublin Cast: Federica Torchetti, Lorenzo Richelmy, Cristiano Caccamo | | |
| O C T O B E R | 13 | Amanda | Director: Carolina Cavalli Cast: Benedetta Porcaroli, Galatea Bellugi, Michele Bravi, Monica Nappo, Margherita Maccapani Missoni, Giovanna Mezzogiorno | | |
| O C T O B E R | 26 | Robbing Mussolini | Director: Renato De Maria Cast: Pietro Castellitto, Matilda De Angelis, Tommaso Ragno, Isabella Ferrari, Filippo Timi | | |
| O C T O B E R | 27 | Strangeness (La stranezza) | Director: Roberto Andò Cast: Toni Servillo, Salvatore Ficarra, Valentino Picone | Medusa Film | |
| O C T O B E R | 28 | Dampyr | Director: Riccardo Chemello Cast: Wade Briggs, Stuart Martin, Frida Gustavsson | | |
| N O V E M B E R | 3 | Caravaggio's Shadow (L'ombra di Caravaggio) | Director: Michele Placido Cast: Riccardo Scamarcio, Louis Garrel, Isabelle Huppert, Micaela Ramazzotti, Vinicio Marchioni, Lolita Chammah, Tedua | 01 Distribution | |
| N O V E M B E R | 17 | Diabolik: Ginko Attacks! | Director: Manetti Bros. Cast: Giacomo Gianniotti, Miriam Leone, Valerio Mastandrea, Monica Bellucci | | |
| N O V E M B E R | 17 | Princess | Director: Roberto De Paolis Cast: Glory Kevin, Lino Musella | Lucky Red | |
| N O V E M B E R | 23 | Bones and All | Director: Luca Guadagnino Cast: Timothée Chalamet, Taylor Russell | | |
| N O V E M B E R | 24 | I Will Not Starve (Non morirò di fame) | Director: Umberto Spinazzola | | |
| N O V E M B E R | 30 | My Name Is Vendetta (Il mio nome è vendetta) | Director: Cosimo Gomez Cast: Alessandro Gassman, Ginevra Francesconi, Remo Girone, Sinja Dieks, Alessio Praticò, Gabriele Falsetta | | |
| D E C E M B E R | 1 | Monica | Director: Andrea Pallaoro Cast: Trace Lysette, Patricia Clarkson, Emily Browning, Joshua Close, Adriana Barraza | | |
| D E C E M B E R | 7 | Chiara | Director: Susanna Nicchiarelli Cast: Margherita Mazzucco, Andrea Carpenzano | | |
| D E C E M B E R | 22 | The Eight Mountains (Le otto montagne) | Director: Felix van Groeningen, Charlotte Vandermeersch Cast: Luca Marinelli, Alessandro Borghi, Filippo Timi, Elena Lietti | | |

== Box office ==
The ten highest-grossing Italian films in 2022, by domestic box office gross revenue, were as follows:

Highest-grossing films of 2022
| Rank | Title | Distributor | Admissions | Domestic gross (€) |
|---|---|---|---|---|
| 1 | Strangeness (La stranezza) | Medusa Film | 840,480 | 5,455,681 |
| 2 | Il grande iorno | Medusa Film | 606,764 | 4,338,424 |
| 3 | Me contro Te - Il film: Persi nel tempo | Warner Bros. Pictures | 531,022 | 3,520,469 |
| 4 | Belli ciao | Vision Distribution | 436,722 | 3,013,400 |
| 5 | The Hummingbird (Il colibrì) | 01 Distribution | 452,280 | 2,956,244 |
| 6 | Ennio | Lucky Red | 442,761 | 2,801,276 |
| 7 | Corro da te | Vision Distribution | 384,715 | 2,446,102 |
| 8 | Caravaggio's Shadow (L'ombra di Caravaggio) | 01 Distribution | 312,809 | 1,985,292 |
| 9 | Dante | Vision Distribution | 280,561 | 1,968,966 |
| 10 | The Eight Mountains (Le otto montagne) | 01 Distribution | 335,255 | 1,834,967 |

== See also ==
- 68th David di Donatello
