= David di Donatello for Best Hairstyling =

Italian film award

- Country: Italy
- Presented by: Accademia del Cinema Italiano
- First award: 2008
- Currently held by: Alberta Giuliani for Kidnapped (2024)
- Website: www.daviddidonatello.it

The David di Donatello for Best Hairstyling (Italian: David di Donatello per la migliore acconciatura) is an award presented annually by the Accademia del Cinema Italiano since 2008. It was presented as the David di Donatello for Best Hairstylist (Italian: David di Donatello per il miglior acconciatore) from 2008 to 2021.

== Winners and nominees ==
=== 2000s ===
Year	English title	Original title	Hairstylist(s)
2008 (53rd)	I Viceré		Maria Teresa Corridoni
2008 (53rd)	Days and Clouds	Giorni e nuvole	Aldina Governatori
2008 (53rd)	Hotel Meina		Ferdinando Merolla
2008 (53rd)	Quiet Chaos	Caos calmo	Sharim Sabatini
2008 (53rd)	Scusa ma ti chiamo amore		Giorgio Gregorini
2009 (54th)	Il divo		Aldo Signoretti
2009 (54th)	Caravaggio		Alessandro Bertolazzi
2009 (54th)	The Demons of St. Petersberg	I demoni di San Pietroburgo	Luigi Rocchetti
2009 (54th)	The Ladies Get Their Say	Due partite	Vincenzo Mastrantonio
2009 (54th)	Wild Blood	Sanguepazzo	Enrico Iacoponi

=== 2010s ===
Year	English title	Original title	Hairstylist(s)
2010 (55th)	Vincere		Alberta Giuliani
2010 (55th)	Baarìa		Giusy Bovino
2010 (55th)	The First Beautiful Thing	La prima cosa bella	Massimo Gattabrusi
2010 (55th)	I, Don Giovanni	Io, Don Giovanni	Aldo Signoretti and Susana Sanchez Nunez
2010 (55th)	The Man Who Will Come	L'uomo che verrà	Daniela Tartari
2011 (56th)	We Believed	Noi credevamo	Aldo Signoretti
2011 (56th)	Amici miei – Come tutto ebbe inizio		Ferdinando Merolla
2011 (56th)	Angel of Evil	Vallanzasca - Gli angeli del male	Claudia Pallotti and Teresa Di Serio
2011 (56th)	Christine Cristina		Maurizio Tamagnini
2011 (56th)	Qualunquemente		Teresa Di Serio
2011 (56th)	The Solitude of Prime Numbers	La solitudine dei numeri primi	Massimo Gattabrusi
2012 (57th)	This Must Be the Place		Kim Santantonio
2012 (57th)	Kryptonite!	La kryptonite nella borsa	Mauro Tamagnini
2012 (57th)	Magnificent Presence	Magnifica presenza	Francesca De Simone
2012 (57th)	Piazza Fontana: The Italian Conspiracy	Romanzo di una strage	Ferdinando Merolla
2012 (57th)	We Have a Pope	Habemus Papam	Carlo Barucci
2013 (58th)	Reality		Daniela Tartari
2013 (58th)	The Best Offer	La migliore offerta	Stefano Ceccarelli
2013 (58th)	Diaz – Don't Clean Up This Blood		Giorgio Gregorini
2013 (58th)	Long Live Freedom	Viva la libertà	Carlo Barucci and Marco Perna
2013 (58th)	Siberian Education	Educazione siberiana	Francesco Pegoretti
2014 (59th)	The Great Beauty	La grande bellezza	Aldo Signoretti
2014 (59th)	Fasten Your Seatbelts	Allacciate le cinture	Francesca De Simone
2014 (59th)	Human Capital	Il capitale umano	Stéphane Desmarez
2014 (59th)	The Chair of Happiness	La sedia della felicità	Sharim Sabatini
2014 (59th)	Those Happy Years	Anni felici	Massimo Gattabrusi
2015 (60th)	Leopardi	Il giovane favoloso	Aldo Signoretti and Alberta Giuliani
2015 (60th)	Black Souls	Anime nere	Rodolfo Sifari
2015 (60th)	I Killed Napoléon	Ho ucciso Napoleone	Daniela Tartari
2015 (60th)	Latin Lover		Alberta Giuliani
2015 (60th)	Wondrous Boccaccio	Maraviglioso Boccaccio	Carlo Barucci
2016 (61st)	Tale of Tales	Il racconto dei racconti - Tale of Tales	Francesco Pegoretti
2016 (61st)	The Correspondence	La corrispondenza	Elena Gregorini
2016 (61st)	Don't Be Bad	Non essere cattivo	Sharim Sabatini
2016 (61st)	They Call Me Jeeg	Lo chiamavano Jeeg Robot	Angelo Vannella
2016 (61st)	Youth	Youth - La giovinezza	Aldo Signoretti
2017 (62nd)	Like Crazy	La pazza gioia	Daniela Tartari
2017 (62nd)	At War with Love	In guerra per amore	Massimiliano Gelo
2017 (62nd)	Indivisible	Indivisibili	Vincenzo Cormaci
2017 (62nd)	Italian Race	Veloce come il vento	Alessio Pompei
2017 (62nd)	Sweet Dreams	Fai bei sogni	Mauro Tamagnini
2018 (63rd)	Nico, 1988		Daniela Altieri
2018 (63rd)	Bloody Richard	Riccardo va all'inferno	Paola Genovese
2018 (63rd)	Fortunata		Mauro Tamagnini
2018 (63rd)	Love and Bullets	Ammore e malavita	Antonio Fidato
2018 (63rd)	Ugly Nasty People	Brutti e cattivi	Sharim Sabatini
2019 (64th)	Loro		Aldo Signoretti
2019 (64th)	Call Me by Your Name	Chiamami col tuo nome	Manolo Garcia
2019 (64th)	Capri-Revolution		Gaetano Panico
2019 (64th)	Dogman		Daniela Tartari
2019 (64th)	The King's Musketeers	Moschettieri del re - La penultima missione	Massimo Gattabrusi

=== 2020s ===
Year	English title	Original title	Hairstylist(s)
2020 (65th)	Pinocchio		Francesco Pegoretti
2020 (65th)	The First King: Birth of an Empire	Il primo re	Marzia Colomba
2020 (65th)	Martin Eden		Daniela Tartari
2020 (65th)	Suspiria		Manolo García
2020 (65th)	The Traitor	Il traditore	Alberta Giuliani
2021 (66th)	Hidden Away	Volevo nascondermi	Aldo Signoretti
2021 (66th)	Bad Tales	Favolacce	Daniele Fiori
2021 (66th)	Hammamet		Massimiliano Duranti
2021 (66th)	The Macaluso Sisters	Le sorelle Macaluso	Aldina Governatori
2021 (66th)	Miss Marx		Domingo Santoro
2022 (67th)	Freaks Out		Marco Perna
2022 (67th)	7 Women and a Murder	7 donne e un mistero	Alberta Giuliani
2022 (67th)	A Chiara		Giuseppina Rotolo
2022 (67th)	Diabolik		Luca Pompozzi
2022 (67th)	I fratelli De Filippo		Francesco Pegoretti
2023 (68th)	Caravaggio's Shadow	L'ombra di Caravaggio	Desiree Corridoni
2023 (68th)	Exterior Night	Esterno notte	Alberta Giuliani
2023 (68th)	L'immensità		Daniela Tartari
2023 (68th)	Lord of the Ants	Il signore delle formiche	Samantha Mura
2023 (68th)	Strangeness	La stranezza	Rudy Sifari
2024 (69th)	Kidnapped	Rapito	Alberta Giuliani
2024 (69th)	La chimera		Daniela Tartari
2024 (69th)	Comandante		Massimo Gattabrusi
2024 (69th)	Io capitano		Stefano Ciammitti and Dalia Colli
2024 (69th)	There's Still Tomorrow	C'è ancora domani	Teresa Di Serio
2025 (70th)	The Flood	Le Déluge	Aldo Signoretti and Domingo Santoro
2025 (70th)	Gloria		Marta Iacoponi and Carla Indoni
2025 (70th)	The Great Ambition	Berlinguer. La grande ambizione	Desiree Corridoni
2025 (70th)	Parthenope		Marco Perna
2025 (70th)	Vermiglio		Tiziana Argiolas

== See also ==
- Academy Award for Best Makeup and Hairstyling
- BAFTA Award for Best Makeup and Hair
- Czech Lion Award for Best Makeup and Hairstyling
- European Film Award for Best Makeup and Hairstyling
- Guldbagge Award for Best Makeup and Hair
