= Mario Mariani =

Italian pianist, composer, and performer (born 1970)

- Born: 6 October 1970 (age 55); Pesaro, Italy
- Occupation: Musician
- Website: http://www.mariomariani.com/

Mario Mariani (born 6 October 1970) is an Italian pianist, composer, and performer.

== Early life and education ==
Born in Pesaro, Italy, Mario Mariani graduated in Piano at the Conservatorio Gioachino Rossini in 1995.

== Career ==
After creating the experimental band Broz Ensemble, he began to write movie soundtracks for highly appreciated Italian directors and artists, including Vittorio Moroni, Gianluigi Toccafondo and Matteo Pellegrini. He also writes musics for TV advertisings for clients like Microsoft, Toyota, Ferrero, Tele2 and Fiat.

He composed two different editions of the main theme for the prestigious Venice Film Festival in 1999-2001 and 2005-2007.

Strongly recognizable for his personal and eclectic approach on piano, Mario Mariani imagines his instrument as an orchestra, with a style that goes from contemporary music to theatrical performances, often in collaboration with actors and visual artists like Giuliano Del Sorbo, Massimo Ottoni and Graziella Galvani. He calls his style "transpersonal instantaneous composition".

In 2008 he won the first prize at Novaracinefestival for Best Soundtrack with the movie "under my garden" by Andrea Lodovichetti.

In 2010 he brought a grand piano into a cave called "Grotta dei Prosciutti", on the top of a mountain called Monte Nerone, living there for a whole month and offering one free concert each night.

He created a unique festival named "Teatro Libero del Monte Nerone" (Free theatre of Monte Nerone) that takes place every August since 2011 in the middle of a wood between Marche and Umbria.

With his second piano solo album "Elementalea" (2011) he starts his own label named "Zingaroton". Mariani played since 2013 Danny Elfman's scores Beetlejuice and Scissorhands and Bernard Hermann's Psycho score.

== Composer ==
=== Theatre ===
- 2013 "Amleto" by Pietro Conversano – prod. AMAT Marche
- 2013 "Encephalon" by Niba, Mario Mariani, Andrea Bartola (prod. Tada')
- 2010 "La terza vita" by Amandio Pinheiro prod. 50N - Rome
- 2008 "Tempesta" by Giovanni Ferri prod.ass.culturale Arte/altro
- 2008 "Il poema dei monti naviganti" with Roberta Biagiarelli, regia. A.Marinuzzi prod. Babelia, CSS Friuli Venezia Giulia, Regione Piemonte
- 2008 "Il cattivo ladrone" by Leonardo Manera prod. Festival Crucifixus
- 2004 "Coèfore" di Eschilo regia di M.Conti with Anna Maria Guarnieri prod.Teatro Stabile Marche/Biennale di Venezia/Orestiadi Gibellina
- 2003 "Il Borghese Gentiluomo" by Molière regia di Giampiero Solari con Giorgio Panariello prod. Teatro Stabile Marche - Teatro Nuovo Milano
- 2002 "Viaggio nelle muse" da Shakespeare regia di Paola Galassi prod. Teatro Stabile Marche
- 2002 "Aspetto e spero" di Leonardo Manera regia Paola Galassi prod. Zelig/Bananas
- 2002 "L'usignolo, non l'allodola" di J.Johnston regia di Paola Galassi prod. Teatro Stabile Marche
- 2002 "Gusci" da Kafka regia Francesco Calcagnini prod. Accademia Belle Arti - Urbino
- 2002 "Pantagruele" regia Sante Maurizi prod. La Botte e il Cilindro - Sassari
- 2001 "Il pasto dell'orco" regia di Fabrizio Bartolucci prod. Teatro Stabile in Rete - TSR
- 2001 "Dialogo della vecchia gioventù" by Gianni D'Elia regia. F.Calcagnini - Accademia Belle Arti - Urbino
- 2000 "Crimini esemplari" by Max Aub regia F.Calcagnini prod. Broz Ensemble / Accademia Belle Arti - Urbino
- 1996 "A dispetto dei santi" regia di F.Calcagnini prod. Accademia Belle Arti - Urbino
- 1995 "Esercizi spirituali in luogo pubblico" (prod. Incertimomenti)
- 1994 "Le città invisibili" da Italo Calvino regia F.Calcagnini/S.Maurizi prod. La Botte e il Cilindro - Sassari
- 1993 "Orazero" (prod. Incertimomenti)

=== Cinema ===
- 2013 " Se chiudo gli occhi non sono più qui" (100') by Vittorio Moroni – prod. 50N/Rai Cinema
- 2013 "Italian movies" (90') by Matteo Pellegrini – prod. Eagle Pictures
- 2009 "Eva e Adamo" (90') by Vittorio Moroni – prod. 50N
- 2007 "Le ferie di Licu" (90') by Vittorio Moroni prod. 50N/Raicinema
- 2007 "Sotto il mio giardino" (20') by Andrea Lodovichetti. prod.Centro Sperimentale Cinematografia
- 2006 "Il matrimonio negato" by Antonio Ciano prod. Nuvola Film
- 2004 "Tu devi essere il Lupo" (90') by Vittorio Moroni prod. Metafilm
- 2003 "Sulle tracce del gatto" (50') by Vittorio Moroni e Andrea Caccia prod. Mikado
- 2002 "Il naso storto" (20') by Antonio Ciano prod. Nuvola Film
- 2002 "Da lontano" (8') by Mauro Santini
- 2001 "Cainà" by Gennaro Righelli (1922) (65') film muto
- 2001 "Di ritorno" (12') by Mauro Santini
- 2001 "Dietro i vetri" (6') by Mauro Santini
- 2001 "Dal cortile" (4') by Mauro Santini
- 2000 "L'incontro" (52') Film TV by Vittorio Moroni (Altamarea Film)
- 2000 "A mille ce n'è" (15') by Paola Bocci (Altamarea Film)
- 1997 "Tourbillon"(13') by Matteo Pellegrini (Altamarea Film)
- 1997 "Girotondo" (5') by Matteo Pellegrini (Altamarea Film)
- 1996 "5 aprile" (11') by Matteo Pellegrini (Altamarea Film)

==== Silent cinema ====
Mario Mariani works intensively and for a long time with silent movies. After his debut in the 90's with Pesaro's Mostra Internazionale del Nuovo Cinema within Silent Cinema retrospective, when he plays (always improvising) on David Wark Griffith, Carl Theodor Dreyer, Robert Wiene, Fritz Lang, Friedrich Wilhelm Murnau, Georges Méliès, Dziga Vertov. The only written music is the original soundtrack for the silent Italian movie Caina (1922, Gennaro Righelli).

The "A Silent Christmas" project is composed by 4 silent movies based on Christmas (A Christmas Carol, A Trap for Santa Claus [1925, by Kleinschmidt], A winter straw ride). In 2014 he realized the music for piano and organ for Life and Passion of Jesus by Ferdinand Zecca.

==== Animated films ====
- 2013 "Hospice Seragnoli Onlus" (2'38") by Magda Guidi e Mara Cerri
- 2012 "Tonda's Wonderland" (2'45") by Magda Guidi e Mara Cerri
- 2009 "7 Sigle per la 45°Mostra Internazionale del Cinema di Pesaro" by M.Santini
- 2005 "Sigla 62° Mostra del Cinema di Venezia" by F. Ghermandi prod. La Biennale di Venezia
- 2004 "Unicri" spot sociale ONU di Gianluigi Toccafondo prod.Lanterna Magica
- 2003 "Cafè l'amour" (10') by Giorgio Valentini prod. Motus Film
- 1999-2001 "Sigla Mostra del Cinema di Venezia" by Gianluigi Toccafondo /Biennale Venezia
- 1999 "Pinocchio" (6') by Gianluigi Toccafondo (prod. Toccafondo/La Sept Arte)
- 1999 "Sipario Ducale" (10') by Gianluigi Toccafondo e Massimo Salvucci
- 1998 "La Sagra" (2'30") by Roberto Catani
- 1998 "Errante Erotico Eretico" (1') by Stefano Franceschetti e Cristiano Carloni
- 1996 "Bambini e TV" (30") by Gianluigi Toccafondo (prod. Mixfilm)
- 1996 "Prague International Marathon" (30") by Gianluigi Toccafondo (Mixfilm)
- 1996 "On the skin" (50") by Mauro Caramanica (prod. Bruno Bozzetto Film)
- 1996 "Majestic Presence" (50') by Letizia Geminiani
- 1995 "Vertigine" (5'45") by Mauro Caramanica
- 1994 "La boxe" (27") by Gianluigi Toccafondo

=== Spot TV and commercials ===
- 2011 "Soul Kitchen" for Lube prod. Greenbubble
- 2004 "Toyota Corolla Verso" prod. Cineteam Rome
- 2003 "Dixan" agenzia DDB - Milan
- 2002 "Ferrero Looney Tunes" ag. Pubbliregia
- 2002 "Parmalat Joy" ag. McCann-Erickson
- 2002 "Ferrero Rocher" prod. Mercurio Cinematografica
- 2002 "Libri Repubblica" ag. Lowe Lintas Pirella Gottsche
- 2001 "Fiat Punto" with Flavio Ibba
- 2001 "Tele2" ag. Ogilvy
- 2001 "Microsoft Office XP" prod. McCann- Erickson
- 2001 "AcmeFilmworks Showreel" (Los Angeles - California)
- 2000 "Conad" Campagna Natalizia Supermercati
- 1999 "Stream" Canale Viaggi 2 serie di spot regia G.Toccafondo
- 1998 "B.P.M" by Matteo Pellegrini (Altamarea Film)
- 1997 "New Penny" (Max Mara) ag. Boxallaseconda
- 1997 "Stefanel" 30' Campagna Stefanel ag. Boxallaseconda

=== Orchestra, operatic and chamber music ===
- 2010 "Bolero 2.0" per orchestra - commissione Filarmonica Marchigiana
- 2006 "Il parlatore eterno", opera lirica; prima es. 28 Giugno 2006 Rassegna Lirica Torelliana – Teatro della Fortuna – FANO
- 2006 "LUZ" per orchestra; prima es. 20 Aprile 2006 Fil. Marchigiana, dir. M. Mariotti
- 2006 "Die Wolf-Gangsters" for young criminals orchestra – comm.Musicamorfosi
- 2005 "Il Colombre" per orchestra scolastica – prima es. Teatro Smeraldo Milano,
- 2003 "A Passo di Gatto " per Banda prima esecuzione: Cartoceto 9 Agosto 2003
- 1998 Isabella by Azio Corghi, opera – collaborazione e arrangiamento "sezioni Rock"
- 1998 "The Masterpie®ce" per flauto rinascimentale e quartetto d'archi: prima esecuzione: Boston - New England Conservatory 24 Settembre 1998
- 1994 "Am I or not a serious composer?" per due flauti prima es. 17 Maggio 1994-Auditorium "La Vela" – Urbino
- 1993 "Acqui" per pianoforte e 14 strumenti ad acqua prima es. 14 Luglio 1993 Festival Ville e Castella - Frantoio del Trionfo - Saltara

=== Discography ===
- 2012 "Elementalea" (piano solo) – Ala bianca/Zingaroton
- 2011 "Intemporanea" (ensemble) Heliopolis Edizioni.
- 2011 "Utopiano" (Piano solo) Vivirecords CD
- 2009 "Eva e Adamo" (Colonna sonora) CD Ed. CAM
- 2007 "Le ferie di Licu" (Colonna sonora) CD Ed. CAM
- 2005 "Tu devi essere il lupo" (Colonna sonora) CD Ed. CAM
- 1996 BROZ ENSEMBLE – (compositore e leader) – LM Records CD
- 1989 CAPILLARY – PTS (compositore e co-leader) – Minotauro –(vinile; ristampa in CD 1996)
