= Giovanni Maria Pagliardi =

Italian composer

Giovanni Maria Pagliardi (1637–1702) was an Italian composer. He became de facto maestro di cappella at Florence Cathedral from 1690, but did not formally gain the title till the death of his predecessor, Pietro Sammartini.

== Works ==
- L'innocenza trionfante, oratorio performed at Ss Annunziata, Genoa in 1660
- Il Caligola delirante, 3-act opera at Teatro SS Giovanni e Paolo in Venice; Giovanni Maria Pagliardi, libretto Domenico Gisberti - 1672 Venice, restaged 1680
- Lisimaco, text by Ivanovich 1673
- Numa Pompilio 1674, Venice
- Lo speziale di villa, Florence - probably not originally by Pagliardi
- Il finto chimico 1686, Florence
- Il pazzo per forza 1687, Pratolino, Florence
- Il tiranno di Colco 1688
- La serva favorita 1689
- Il Greco in Troia 1689
- Attilio Regolo 1693

== Recordings ==
- Caligula (DVD) selections from the opera - puppet staging [80' min] by Mimmo Cuticchio and his puppet troop L'Opera dei Pupi; with music by Jan van Elsacker, Caroline Meng, Florian Götz, Jean-Francois Lombard, Sophie Junker, Serge Gougioud, Le Poeme Harmonique, Vincent Dumestre Alpha 2018
