= L'immensità (film) =

2022 film by Emanuele Crialese

- Italian theatrical release poster
- Directed by: Emanuele Crialese
- Screenplay by: Emanuele Crialese; Francesca Manieri; Vittorio Moroni
- Story by: Emanuele Crialese
- Produced by: Mario Gianani; Lorenzo Gangarossa
- Starring: Penélope Cruz; Luana Giuliani; Vincenzo Amato; Patrizio Francioni; Maria Chiara Goretti; Penelope Nieto Conti; Alvia Reale; India Santella; Mariangela Granelli
- Cinematography: Gergely Pohárnok
- Edited by: Clelio Benevento
- Music by: Rauelsson
- Production companies: Wildside; Warner Bros. Entertainment Italia; Chapter 2; Pathé; France 3 Cinéma
- Distributed by: Warner Bros. Pictures (Italy); Pathé Films (France)
- Release dates: 4 September 2022 (Venice); 15 September 2022 (Italy); 11 January 2023 (France)
- Running time: 99 minutes
- Countries: Italy; France
- Language: Italian
- Box office: $3 million

L'immensità (transl. The Immensity) is a 2022 drama film directed by Emanuele Crialese, who co-wrote the screenplay with Francesca Manieri and Vittorio Moroni. It stars Penélope Cruz, Luana Giuliani and Vincenzo Amato. An international co-production between Italy and France, the film follows a dysfunctional family in Italy in the 1970s.

== Synopsis ==
In 1970s Rome, Clara is a nonconformist Spanish expatriate trapped in a loveless marriage to Felice, an unfaithful and abusive businessman, with whom she has three children: Adriana, Gino and Diana. Their eldest child, 12-year-old Adriana, experiences gender dysphoria. Adriana rejects girlhood and instead identifies as a boy, wearing boys' clothes and adopting the masculine name Andrea. (Note: "Andrew" in the English subtitles) One day, Andrea befriends Sara, a Romani girl who knows him as a boy. Upon a shared sense of being outsiders, Andrea and Clara grow closer.

== Cast ==
- Penélope Cruz as Clara Borghetti
- Luana Giuliani as Adriana "Adri" / Andrea Borghetti
- Vincenzo Amato as Felice Borghetti
- Patrizio Francioni as Gino Borghetti
- Maria Chiara Goretti as Diana Borghetti
- Penelope Nieto Conti as Sara
- Alvia Reale as the grandmother
- India Santella as María
- Mariangela Granelli as the doctor
- Valentina Cenni as Giuseppina
- Clara Ponsot as Camilla

== Production ==
The screenplay was written by Crialese, Francesca Manieri and Vittorio Moroni. An Italian-French co-production, L'immensità was produced by Wildside, Warner Bros. Entertainment Italia, Chapter 2, Pathé, and France 3 Cinéma.

== Release ==
The film had its world premiere at the 79th Venice International Film Festival on 4 September 2022. It was released theatrically in Italy on 15 September 2022 by Warner Bros. Pictures and in France on 11 January 2023 by Pathé Films and The United States on May 12 2023 by Music Box Films.

== Reception ==
On the review aggregator website Rotten Tomatoes, L'Immensità holds an approval rating of 83% based on 59 reviews, with an average rating of 6.6/10. The website's critics consensus reads, "L'immensità can be excessively immense at times but with an always superlative Penélope Cruz at its core, this vibrant coming-of-age story with undeniable heart is a memorable experience." Metacritic, which uses a weighted average, assigned the film a score of 70 out of 100, based on 19 critics, indicating "generally favorable reviews".

Leslie Felperin of The Hollywood Reporter summed the film up as "a vibrant, if over-crammed, family affair." For Variety, Guy Lodge writes that the film "is too palpably pained and heartfelt to be called slight, but it's sensitive and peculiar in ways that feel fragile".

Robbie Collin, writing for The Daily Telegraph, rated the film four out of five stars, deeming the "surprisingly autobiographical" picture to be "a child's-eye-view portrait of domestic sadness and the craving for escape from it". Wendy Ide of Screen Daily highlighted Cruz's performance as "a cross between Sophia Loren and a solar flare". Stephanie Bunbury of Deadline Hollywood considered that deep down, the film "is fundamentally quite bleak, but it wears a delightfully cheerful face".

=== Accolades ===
Year	Award	Category	Nominee(s)	Result	Ref.
2023	31st Actors and Actresses Union Awards	Best Actress in an International Production	Penélope Cruz	Nominated	
2023	68th David di Donatello Awards	Best Original Screenplay	Emanuele Crialese, Francesca Manieri, Vittorio Moroni	Nominated	
2023	68th David di Donatello Awards	Best Actress	Penélope Cruz	Nominated	
2023	68th David di Donatello Awards	Best Hairstyling	Daniela Tartari	Nominated	

== See also ==
- List of Italian films of 2022
- List of French films of 2023
- List of feature films with transgender characters
