= Caos calmo =

Caos calmo may refer to:

- Caos calmo (novel), a 2005 novel by Sandro Veronesi
- Quiet Chaos (film), a 2008 Italian film based on the novel
