= Terraferma (film) =

2011 film

- Theatrical release poster
- Directed by: Emanuele Crialese
- Written by: Emanuele Crialese; Vittorio Moroni
- Produced by: Marco Chimenz; Giovanni Stabilini; Riccardo Tozzi; Fabio Massimo Cacciatori
- Starring: Filippo Pucillo; Donatella Finocchiaro; Mimmo Cuticchio; Giuseppe Fiorello; Timnit T.; Claudio Santamaria
- Cinematography: Fabio Cianchetti
- Edited by: Simona Paggi
- Music by: Franco Piersanti
- Production companies: Cattleya; France 2 Cinéma; CNC
- Distributed by: 01 Distribution
- Release dates: 4 September 2011 (Venice Film Festival); 7 September 2011 (Italy)
- Running time: 88 minutes
- Country: Italy
- Languages: Italian; France
- Budget: €7.85 million

Terraferma is a 2011 Italian drama film directed by Emanuele Crialese, who co-wrote the screenplay with Vittorio Moroni. The film chronicles the intensification of the refugee crisis in Insular Italy in the beginning of the 2010s.

The film had its world premiere at the 68th Venice International Film Festival, and was selected as the Italian entry for the Best Foreign Language Film at the 84th Academy Awards, but it did not make the final shortlist.

== Plot ==
On Linosa, fishermen are punished for saving illegal immigrants (refugees) from the sea and, back on shore, letting them go, because this amounts to facilitating illegal immigration. Therefore young local Filippo does not allow them on his boat. After witnessing several deaths, Filippo changes his mind and helps a family (a mother, a little boy and a newborn baby) adrift at the Mediterranean sea to arrive at the Italian mainland.

== Cast ==
- Filippo Pucillo as Filippo
- Donatella Finocchiaro as Giulietta
- Mimmo Cuticchio as Ernesto
- Giuseppe Fiorello as Nino
- Timnit T. as Sara
- Claudio Santamaria as Santamaria
- Tiziana Lodato as Maria

== Production ==
The film was produced through Italy's Cattleya with 10% co-production support from France, including 200,000 euro from France 2 Cinéma and money from the CNC. The total budget was €7.85 million.

== Release ==
The film had its world premiere at the 68th Venice International Film Festival where it was screened in the main competition, winning the Special Jury Prize.

It was released in Italian theaters on 7 September 2011 through 01 Distribution.

== Reception ==
=== Critical response ===
Terraferma has an approval rating of 67% on review aggregator website Rotten Tomatoes, based on 24 reviews, and an average rating of 6.3/10. Metacritic assigned the film a weighted average score of 57 out of 100, based on 9 critics, indicating "mixed or average reviews".

Jay Weissberg of Variety described it as "a well-made movie with no pretension but also no crying need to be at a major film festival." Deborah Young of The Hollywood Reporter called it "a morally passionate social drama, muted by overly familiar storytelling." Gary Goldstein of the Los Angeles Times wrote, "The thematically rich production is grounded in deep moral and emotional reflection." Chuck Wilson of The Village Voice called it predictable and heavy-handed.

== See also ==
- List of submissions to the 84th Academy Awards for Best Foreign Language Film
- List of Italian submissions for the Academy Award for Best Foreign Language Film
- List of Italian films of 2011
- Movies about immigration to Italy
