= Valerio Ferrara =

Italian film director

- Notable work: A Conspiracy Man (2022)

Valerio Ferrara (Rome, 1996) is an Italian film director, which has gained resonance for his short films Notte romana (2021) and A Conspiracy Man (2022). Both short films obtained critical acclaims. Notte romana was given a Special Mention for Best Short Film at the Venice Biennale, and A Conspiracy Man won the first prize at La Cinef in 2022. In 2024 he has made his debut directing his first feature film, Il complottista, which has developed the themes of his second short film A Cospiracy Man.

== Early life and education ==
Ferrara attended high school at the Liceo Terenzio Mamiani in Rome, studying also piano and composition. After a degree in Art and Drama History at the Sapienza University of Rome, he graduated of the Centro Sperimentale di Cinematografia.

== Work ==
In 2022, Ferrara's short film Notte Romana was nominated for the Silver Shorts category at the Corti d'Argento, part of the Nastri d'Argento awards presented by the SNGCI (Italian National Syndicate of Film Journalists). He was also nominated for the David di Donatello Awards in 2022.

Following his Cannes award, Ferrara has developed a feature film alongside his theme, presented in October 2024.

== Filmography ==
Credits
Year	Title	Notes
2021	Notte Romana	
2022	A Conspiracy Man	
2024	Il complottista	

== Awards and recognition ==
Ceremony	Award	Nominated work	Result	Ref.
La Biennale di Venezia	FEDIC Award - Special Mention for Best Short Film	Notte Romana	Won	
2022 Cannes Film Festival	Premier Prix	A Conspiracy Man	Won	
2023 Austin Film Festival	Narrative Student Short (Audience)	A Conspiracy Man	Won	
2023 David di Donatello Awards	Best short film	A Conspiracy Man	Nominated	
