= Exilados do Vulcão =

2013 film directed by Paula Gaitán

- Film poster
- Directed by: Paula Gaitán
- Written by: Paula Gaitán; Rodrigo de Oliveira
- Starring: Vincenzo Amato; Bruno Cesário; Clara Choveaux
- Cinematography: Inti Briones
- Production company: Franco Filmes
- Release dates: September 25, 2013 (Festival de Brasília); April 26, 2016 (Brazil)
- Running time: 125 minutes
- Country: Brazil
- Language: Portuguese

Exilados do Vulcão is a 2013 Brazilian drama film directed by Paula Gaitán. The film premiered at the 2013 Festival de Brasília.

== Cast ==
- Vincenzo Amato as Pedro
- Clara Choveaux as Luiza
- Bel García as Bel
- Lorena Lobato as Lorena
- Simone Spoladore as Estela

== Reception ==
The critic of Folha de S. Paulo wrote: "The filmmaker made a film that comes closest to video art. Perhaps it was the case of exhibiting it in art galleries."

== Awards ==
2013: Festival de Brasília

1. Best Picture (won)
2. Best Sound (Edson Secco / Fábio Andrade) (won)
