= Iago (film) =

2009 Italian drama film

- Directed by: Volfango De Biasi
- Written by: Volfango de Biasi; Felice Di Basilio; Tiziana Martini
- Starring: Nicolas Vaporidis; Laura Chiatti
- Cinematography: Enrico Lucidi
- Edited by: Stefano Chierchiè
- Music by: Michele Braga
- Distributed by: Medusa Film
- Release date: 27 February 2009 (Italy)
- Running time: 101 minutes
- Country: Italy
- Language: Italian

Iago is a 2009 Italian teen drama film directed by Volfango De Biasi.

== Cast ==
- Nicolas Vaporidis as Iago
- Laura Chiatti as Desdemona
- Giulia Steigerwalt as Emilia
- Gabriele Lavia as Brabanzio
- Aurélien Gaya as Otello
- Fabio Ghidoni as Cassio
- Lorenzo Gleijeses as Roderigo
- Dina Braschi as Maria
- Luana Rossetti as Bianca, Roderigo's sister
- Francesca Lukasik as Deborah
