= Still Time (film) =

- Directed by: Alessandro Aronadio
- Screenplay by: Alessandro Aronadio; Renato Sannio
- Story by: Josh Lawson
- Starring: Edoardo Leo; Barbara Ronchi
- Cinematography: Roberto Forza
- Edited by: Roberto Di Tanna
- Music by: Santi Pulvirenti
- Distributed by: Netflix
- Release date: 2022
- Language: Italian

Still Time (Italian: Era ora) is a 2022 Italian comedy-drama film co-written and directed by Alessandro Aronadio.

== Plot ==
Dante abruptly and passionately kisses stranger Alice on New Year's Eve, mistaking her for his date Fede, as they're dressed identically. Fede slaps him, and leaves. Alice and Dante become involved and move in together. She's an artistic painter while he's away, swamped at work. Alice and their friends put together Dante's fortieth birthday in October 2010 at their place, to which he's very late because of work and then visiting his dementia-inflicted father. At the party, Dante's lifelong friend Valerio gives him tickets to ride a roller coaster they'd always dreamed of. Dante doesn't have time, as he's planning to focus the upcoming decade on work. When he blows out the candles on his birthday cake, he makes a wish and the party abruptly ends.

Dante wakes to find Alice vomiting in the bathroom. He wrongly guesses she binge-drank the night before, then sees she's pregnant. Mentioning she's in her 21st week, she offers him to feel a kick. That, and the changed furniture spook him. Dante decides to go into work later, as Alice prepares his 41st birthday pancake. When next Dante wakes, he believes he'd dreamt about the pregnancy, as Alice is thin again. Then he hears a baby crying, who Alice gets him to hold to prepare her bottle, although he's clearly uncomfortable. Not knowing it, Dante gets Alice to reveal his daughter's name, and is surprised it's Galadriel. Dante's doctor assures him that he's healthy, although work-related stress could be to blame. Home again, Alice asks him to look after the inconsolable baby. Once she's finally asleep, he tries to keep awake, but finally awakens with a moustache and 43. Dante now knows every day he time travels to the next year's birthday.

Dante has missed Galadriel’s first words and steps from over-working. Telling Valerio about the time jumping, he doesn’t believe him. Blaming work stress, Dante goes to quit but instead jumps and is now the boss. He’s had the position eight months. Alice reminds him of their couple’s therapy session, and there discovers he’s never home due to boredom. Going home alone, Dante jumps to 45. Now separated, Dante convinces Alice to meet to talk. First, he has to talk his Alzheimer's afflicted father off his nursing home’s terrace, then notes his disease helps him forget how he neglected his family. At home, Dante finds his secretary Francesca half-naked and discovers it’s been a 6-month affair. When Alice arrives, he gets Francesca to hide. She says she misses him, they mutually declare their love and kiss. Spotting pumps, Alice realizes Dante isn't alone, and leaves, upset. He begs Francesca to keep things ended before she leaves.

Now 46, Dante finds Francesca with a tray of birthday cocktails for a back yard party. He expulses all but Valerio, who he tells his wish six years ago was for more time, but got the opposite. Going to Alice’s, she closes the door on Dante as she needs to move on. Frantically knocking and declaring his love, Dante faces Omar, Alice’s partner. The 47 y.o. takes Galadriel and Omar’s puppy to the park. Returning, Omar suggests he live in the now. Dante throws the dog’s ball, and another year passes. In the park, Dante discovers Valerio is battling cancer, so insists he call him tomorrow. He rifles through mementos, sees Alice’s exhibition and visits his father. Dante admits he’s become equally neglectful of his family at 49.

Fetching his father water, Dante returns to find he's passed. Outside, Valerio is waiting for him, and in remission. Dante borrows his car, demands his 90+ vacation days, gets a puppy and meets Alice and Galadriel at home. Today Dante just wants to be together doing nothing special, to enjoy the moment, as both Galadriel and Omar had once mentioned. They spend the day playing and enjoying each other's company. Dante reads a book with Alice's illustrations to put Galadriel to sleep, and they fall asleep together. As Dante wakes alone, he assumes another year has passed. Going into the kitchen, he finds them making a belated birthday pancake as it's finally tomorrow. Dante tells them of vacation time, and vows that work will never come before them again.

== Cast ==
- Edoardo Leo as Dante
- Barbara Ronchi as Alice
- Mario Sgueglia as Valerio
- Francesca Cavallin as Francesca
- Raz Degan as Omar
- Valentina Pastore as Federica
- Massimo Wertmüller as Marcello

== Release ==
The film premiered at the 2022 Rome Film Festival, and was released on Netflix on 16 March 2023.

== Reception ==
On Rotten Tomatoes, the film has an approval rating of 75% based on 8 reviews.
