= Respiro =

- DVD cover
- Directed by: Emanuele Crialese
- Written by: Emanuele Crialese
- Produced by: Domenico Procacci; Anne-Dominique Toussaint
- Starring: Valeria Golino; Vincenzo Amato
- Production companies: Fandango; Les Films des Tournelles; Roissy Films
- Distributed by: Sony Pictures Entertainment
- Release dates: 20 May 2002 (Cannes); 22 May 2002 (Italy); 1 January 2003 (France)
- Running time: 95 minutes
- Country: Italy
- Languages: Italian, Sicilian

Respiro is a 2002 Italian-French drama film written and directed by Emanuele Crialese. It was released in English-language markets in 2003. The film stars Valeria Golino, Vincenzo Amato, and Francesco Casisa. In the Italian language, respiro means breath.

== Plot ==
Grazia, played by Golino, is a free-spirited mother of three married to shy fisherman Pietro (Vincenzo Amato) and living on the idyllic but isolated island of Lampedusa in the Mediterranean Sea. She shows signs of manic depressive behaviour—one moment she is laughing wildly and swimming half-naked in the sea, while the next she is curled in a ball on her bed. Out of her earshot, the adult members of her extended family vaguely discuss sending her to a facility of some sort in Northern Italy.

Grazia is closely shepherded by her oldest son Pasquale, played by Casisa. After Pietro puts down one of Grazia's dogs because he thinks it might be dangerous, impulsive Grazia sets all the stray dogs free in the town's makeshift kennel. After the dogs swarm over the island, the locals demand that Pietro do something about his wife. But when he tells her he plans to send her away to Northern Italy, she runs away and hides in a cave on the shore, where she is secretly tended by Pasquale, who brings her food every day.

Pietro and some friends doggedly search the island for Grazia, so Pasquale leaves one of her dresses by the edge of the sea as a ruse. Pietro finds the dress—the one she was wearing the day she disappeared—and nearly everyone presumes she has drowned. Pietro, however, continues to search for her, and just before an important local religious festival, he sees her swimming in the water. He dives in to assist her, thinking a miracle has occurred, and many of the villagers follow suit, thus providing a sheltering circle around her as she is brought safely to shore.

== Awards and nominations ==
Writer/director Crialese won the Critics Week Grand Prize and the Young Critics Award at the Cannes Film Festival. The film was also nominated for the Best European Union Film at the César Awards and received other nominations and awards in various European award competitions.

== Soundtrack ==
Artist John Surman wrote the original score featuring sequenced synthesizer and alto saxophone. There was no soundtrack CD released, however part of the score can be found on his 1981 album The Amazing Adventures of Simon Simon. The track is called "Part 1 - Nestor's Saga (The Tale of The Ancient)". The soundtrack also featured "La Bambola" performed by the Italian artist Patty Pravo.

== Critical reception ==
The English-language reviews for Respiro were generally positive. Steven Holden wrote in The New York Times that "not since Y Tu Mamá También has a movie so palpably captured the down-to-earth, flesh-and-blood reality of high-spirited people living their lives without self-consciousness." Writing for Premiere magazine, critic Peter Debruge noted, "in the annals of Mediterranean island love stories, Respiro reflects the effortless charm of a film like Il Postino."

Critic Desson Thomson of The Washington Post, however, felt "its long-winded denouement, in which Grazia runs away rather than be sent to an institution, doesn't bring the story full circle. It just extends it."
