= Ciao America =

- Directed by: Frank Ciota
- Cinematography: Giulio Pietromarchi
- Music by: Andrea Morricone
- Release date: 2002
- Language: English

Ciao America is a 2002 American-Italian comedy-drama film directed by Frank Ciota.

== Cast ==
- Eddie Malavarca as Lorenzo Primavera
- Maurizio Nichetti as Giulio Fellini
- Violante Placido as Paola Angelini
- Nathaniel Marston as Skip Cromwell
- Anthony DeSando as Frank Mantovani
- Giancarlo Giannini as Zi' Felice
- Paul Sorvino as Antonio Primavera
- Vincenzo Amato as Bongo
