= Diva Futura (film) =

2024 film directed by Giulia Louise Steigerwalt

- Directed by: Giulia Louise Steigerwalt
- Screenplay by: Giulia Louise Steigerwalt
- Based on: Don't Tell Mom I'm a Secretary by Debora Attanasio
- Produced by: Matteo Rovere
- Starring: Denise Capezza; Pietro Castellito; Barbara Ronchi; Lidja Kordic
- Cinematography: Vladan Radovic
- Edited by: Gianni Vezzosi
- Music by: Michele Braga
- Production company: Groenlandia
- Distributed by: PiperFilm
- Release date: September 4, 2024 (Venice)
- Running time: 125 minutes
- Country: Italy
- Language: Italian

Diva Futura is a 2024 film written and directed by Giulia Louise Steigerwalt about the pornographic film studio of the same name starring Pietro Castellitto as studio founder Riccardo Schicchi.

The film premiered at the 81st Venice International Film Festival, where it was competing for the Golden Lion.

== Premise ==
Based on the 2013 book Non dite alla mamma che faccio la segretaria (Don't Tell Mom I'm a Secretary) by Debora Attanasio, Diva Futura follows the operations of the Diva Futura studio through the 1980s and 1990s.

== Cast ==
- Pietro Castellitto as Riccardo Schicchi
- Barbara Ronchi as Debora Attanasio
- Tesa Litvan as Éva Henger
- Denise Capezza as Moana Pozzi
- Lidija Kordic as Ilona Staller
- Davide Iachini as Massimiliano Caroletti
- Marco Iermanò as Valentino

== Release ==
Diva Futura was selected to premiere in competition at the 2024 Venice International Film Festival.
