= ReWined =

- Directed by: Ferdinando Vicentini Orgnani
- Written by: Ferdinando Vicentini Orgnani; Heidrun Schleef
- Story by: Fabio Marcotto
- Starring: Vincenzo Amato; Giovanna Mezzogiorno
- Cinematography: Dante Spinotti
- Music by: Paolo Fresu
- Release date: December 12, 2013 (Courmayeur Film Festival)
- Running time: 92 minutes
- Country: Italy
- Language: Italian

ReWined (Italian: Vinodentro) is a 2013 neo-noir film written and directed by Ferdinando Vicentini Orgnani and starring Vincenzo Amato and Giovanna Mezzogiorno. It is based on the novel Vino dentro by Fabio Marcotto.

== Cast ==
- Vincenzo Amato as Giovanni Cuttin
- Giovanna Mezzogiorno as Adele
- Lambert Wilson as The Professor
- Pietro Sermonti as Commissario Sanfelice
- Daniela Virgilio as Margherita
- Erika Blanc as Madre Commissario Sanfelice
- Gioele Dix as Direttore rivista Bibenda
- Veronica Gentili as Miriam Poggiolini
- Franco Trevisi as Marco

== See also ==
- List of Italian films of 2013
