= Vincenzo Amato =

Italian actor and sculptor (born 1966)

- Born: 30 March 1966 (age 59); Palermo, Italy
- Occupation: Actor

Vincenzo Amato (born 30 March 1966) is an Italian actor and sculptor.

== Life and career ==
Born in Palermo as the son of the stage director and folk musician Emma Muzzi Loffredo, after high school Amato moved to Rome, where his mother lived.

Always dedicated to painting, he finished university focused on iron sculpting. After a couple of exhibitions at the art gallery Il Gabbiano in Rome, he moved to Manhattan, New York and began to exhibit with some success at the Earl McGrath Gallery in New York. In the US, Amato became friends with the director Emanuele Crialese, who directed his debut as an actor in the film Once We Were Strangers. His career as an actor had a breakthrough with the role of the fisherman Pietro in Crialise's next film, Respiro.

In 2007, he was nominated for David di Donatello for Best Actor for his performance in Nuovomondo.

== Partial filmography ==
- Once We Were Strangers (1997) - Antonio
- Prison Song (2001) - Store Owner
- Ciao America (2002) - Bongo
- Respiro (2002) - Pietro
- Nuovomondo (2006) - Salvatore Mancuso
- The Sweet and the Bitter (2007) - Vito Scordia, Saro's father
- Autumn Dawn (2007) - Marco
- Einstein (2008, TV Movie) - Albert Einstein
- Did You Hear About the Morgans? (2009) - Girard Rabelais
- School Is Over (2010) - Aldo Talarico
- Girl on a Bicycle (2013) - Paolo Moretti
- Exilados do Vulcão (2013) - Pedro
- ReWined (2013) - Giovanni
- War Story (2014) - Filippo
- Darker Than Midnight (2014) - Massimo, Davide's father
- Unbroken (2014) - Anthony
- The Wannabe (2015) - Richie
- Soundtrack (2015) - Paolo
- Abbraccialo per me (2016) - Pietro
- The Habit of Beauty (2016) - Ernesto
- It's the Law (2017) - Pierpaolo Natoli
- Sicilian Ghost Story (2017) - Padre di Luna
- Veleni (2017) - Dr. Bonadies
- The Assassination of Gianni Versace: American Crime Story (2018) - Versace Spokesman
- Unbroken: Path to Redemption (2018) - Anthony Zamperini
- Tornare (2019) - Marc Bennet
- Caught by a Wave (2021) - Antonio
- Red Notice (2021) - Director Gallo
- L'immensità (2022) - Felice
- Maestro (2023) - Bruno Zirato
