= Mimmo Cuticchio =

Italian cantastorie, puppeteer, actor and playwright (born 1948)

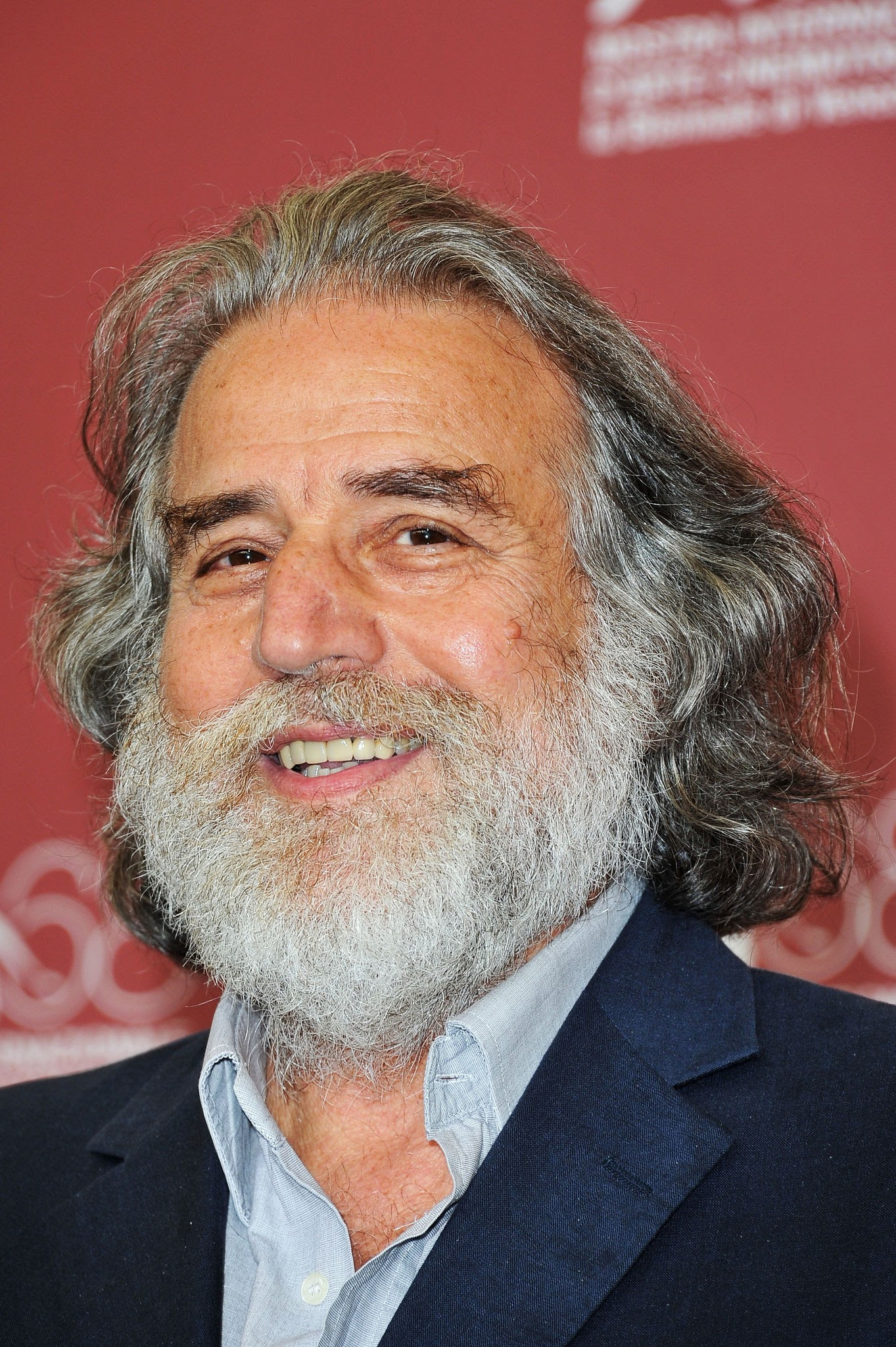
- Cuticchio in 2017
- Born: 30 March 1948 (age 77); Gela, Caltanissetta Italy
- Occupation(s): Cantastorie, puppeteer, actor and playwright

Mimmo Cuticchio (born 30 March 1948) is an Italian cantastorie, puppeteer, actor and playwright.

== Life and career ==
Born in Gela, the son of Giacomo, a puppeteer who had a travelling theatre, Cuticchio inherited the family legacy and in 1973 founded the Teatro dei Pupi Santa Rosalia, an Opera dei Pupi in Palermo. The same year he wrote his first cantastoria play, Giuseppe Balsamo conte di Cagliostro. In 1977 he founded the association and stage company "Figli D'Arte Cuticchio".

During his career Cuticchio focused on renewing the arts of Opera dei Pupi and cantastoria, opening them to contemporary themes and to civil commitments. As an actor, he appeared in several films, notably playing a leading role in Emanuele Crialese's Terraferma. In 2022, he received an honorary degree from Roma Tre University.

In 2007, he won the Hystrio Award in the Teatro Festival Mantova.

In 2015 the collection of Sicilian puppets started by his father was acquired by the Sicily Foundation, and is now on display at Palazzo Branciforte, Palermo.

== Filmography ==
- One Hundred Days in Palermo (Italian: Cento giorni a Palermo), directed by Giuseppe Ferrara (1984)
- The Godfather Part III, directed by Francis Ford Coppola (1990)
- Rehearsals for a Sicilian Tragedy, (Italian: Prove per una tragedia siciliana) directed by Roman Paska (2009)
- Baarìa, directed by Giuseppe Tornatore (2009)
- Terraferma, directed by Emanuele Crialese (2011)
- Cha cha cha, directed by Marco Risi (2013)
- In the Name of the Italian People, (Italian: Nel nome del popolo italiano) directed by Maurizio Sciarra (2017)
- Cùntami, directed by Giovanna Taviani (2021)
