= Barbara Ronchi =

Italian actress (born 1982)

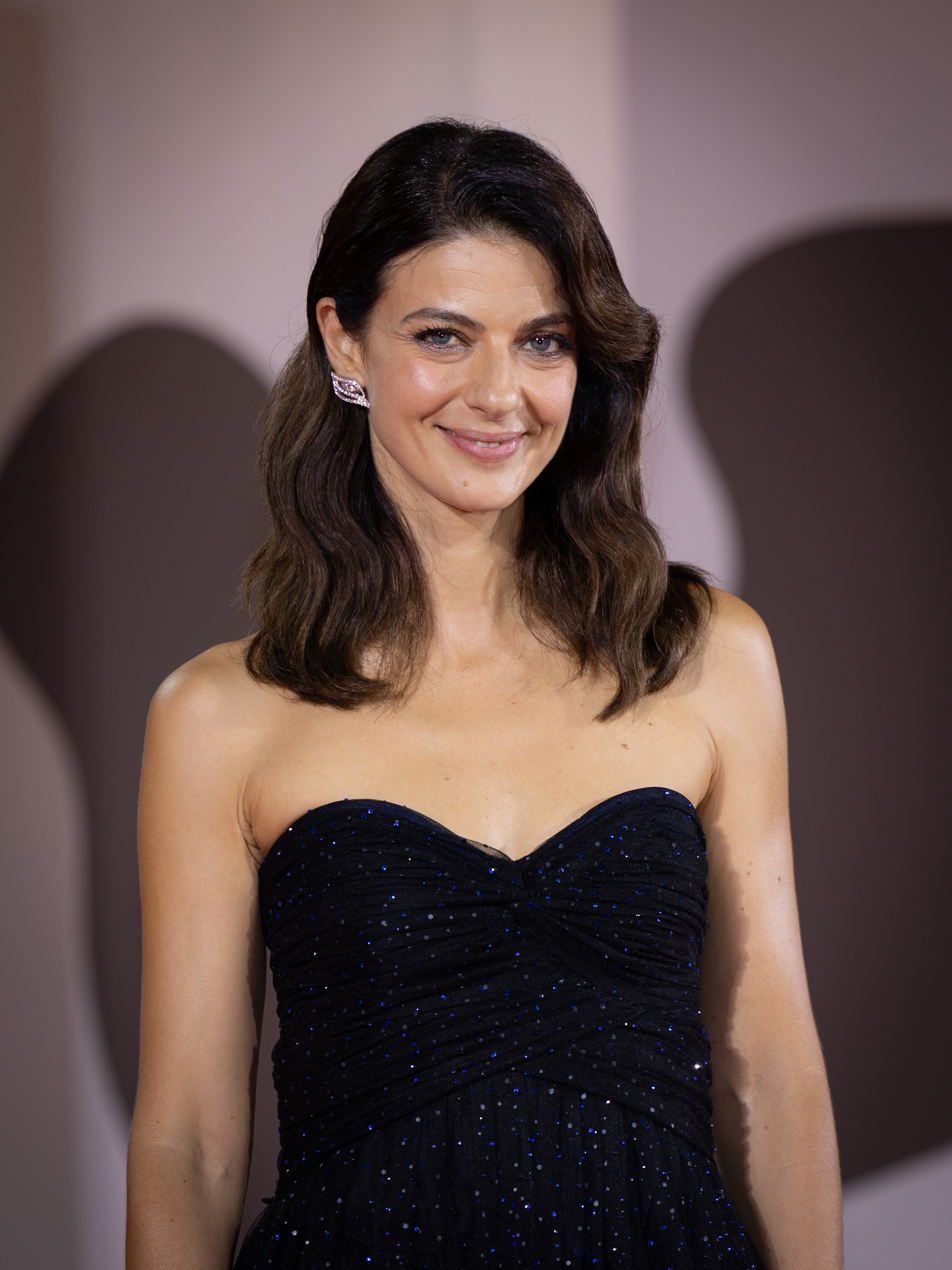
- Ronchi at the 2024 Venice International Film Festival
- Born: 22 June 1982 (age 43); Rome, Italy
- Occupation: Actress

Barbara Ronchi (born 22 June 1982) is an Italian television, stage and film actress.

== Life and career ==
Born in Rome, the daughter of a lithographer and a housewife, Ronchi graduated in historical and archaeological sciences and studied acting at the Accademia Nazionale di Arte Drammatica Silvio D'Amico. She started her career on stage, in which she worked with Fausto Paravidino, Carlo Cecchi and Valerio Binasco, among others. She made her film debut in 2010, in the drama La città invisibile.

Since 2019, Ronchi has portrayed Diana De Santis on the Italian mystery-drama Imma Tataranni: Deputy Prosecutor.

In 2023, Ronchi won the David di Donatello for Best Actress for her performance as Francesca in the 2022 film September. She portrayed Marianna Padovani Mortara in the 2023 film Kidnapped, for which she won the Nastro d'Argento for Best Actress, and earned a nomination for a David di Donatello for Best Actress. In 2023, she also received a nomination for Best Actress at the Czech Lion Awards for her role in Il Boemo.

In 2024, Ronchi starred as Licia Licino in Familia, and was nominated for a David di Donatello for the role in April 2025.

In 2025, Ronchi was appointed the jury member of the Progressive Cinema, Freestyle and Grand Public Competition sections at the 20th Rome Film Festival.

== Filmography ==
=== Film ===
| Year | Title | Role | Notes |
|---|---|---|---|
| 2010 | La città invisibile | Lucilla | |
| 2013 | Miele | Sandra | |
| 2016 | Sweet Dreams | Massimo's mother | |
| 2017 | Couch Potatoes | Annalisa | |
| 2017 | Tito e gli alieni | Professor's wife (voice) | |
| 2019 | Tomorrow's a New Day | Caterina | |
| 2019 | I'm Not a Killer | Vittoria | |
| 2019 | Sole | Bianca | |
| 2019 | Tornare | Virginia | |
| 2020 | Bad Tales | | |
| 2020 | Padrenostro | Gina Le Rose | |
| 2020 | Everything's Gonna Be Alright | Fiorella | |
| 2021 | Mondocane | Katia | |
| 2021 | Io sono Babbo Natale | Laura | |
| 2022 | September | Francesca | David di Donatello for Best Actress |
| 2022 | Sulle nuvole | Francesca | |
| 2022 | Il Boemo | Caterina Gabrielli | |
| 2022 | Still Time | Alice | |
| 2023 | Kidnapped | Marianna Padovani Mortara | Nastro d'Argento for Best Actress |
| 2023 | Non riattaccare | Irene | |
| 2023 | Santocielo | Giovanna | |
| 2024 | Dieci minuti | Bianca Bevilacqua | |
| 2024 | The Children's Train | Derna | |
| 2024 | Diva Futura | Debora Attanasio | |
| 2024 | Feeling Better | Curiosone's Wife | |
| 2024 | Familia | Licia Licino | |
| 2026 | Antartica - Quasi una fiaba | Maria Medri | |

=== Television ===
| Year | Title | Role | Notes |
|---|---|---|---|
| 2012 | La Certosa di Parma | Cecchina | TV movie |
| 2016 | In arte Nino | | TV movie |
| 2018 | La linea verticale | Elisa | 8 episodes |
| 2018 | Romanzo famigliare | Denise | |
| 2019–present | Imma Tataranni: Deputy Prosecutor | Diana De Santis | Series regular |
| 2020 | Luna Nera | Antalia | 6 episodes |
| 2022 | Vostro onore | Sara Vichi | Miniseries |

== Awards and nominations ==
| Award | Year | Category | Work | Result | Ref. |
|---|---|---|---|---|---|
| David di Donatello | 2023 | Best Actress | September | Won | |
| David di Donatello | 2024 | Best Actress | Kidnapped | Nominated | |
| David di Donatello | 2025 | Best Actress | Familia | Nominated | |
| Nastro d'Argento | 2022 | Best Comedy Actress | September | Nominated | |
| Nastro d'Argento | 2023 | Best Actress | Kidnapped | Won | |
| Nastro d'Argento | 2025 | Best Comedy Actress | Diva Futura | Nominated | |
| Nastro d'Argento | 2025 | Premio Nino Manfredi | | Won | |
