= The Hummingbird =

2019 novel by Sandro Veronesi

- First edition cover
- Author: Sandro Veronesi
- Original title: Il colibrì
- Translator: Elena Pala
- Language: Italian
- Publisher: La nave di Teseo
- Publication date: 24 October 2019
- Publication place: Italy
- English publication date: 2021
- Media type: Print
- Pages: 366
- Awards: Strega Prize (2020)
- ISBN: 9788834600474
- OCLC: 1128033851
- Dewey Decimal: 853/.914
- LC Class: PQ4882.E7675 C65 2019

The Hummingbird (Italian: Il colibrì) is a 2019 novel by Sandro Veronesi. The novel is presented in fragments with a nonlinear narrative structure and follows the tumultuous life of ophthalmologist Marco Carrera. It won the prestigious Strega Prize (2020).

== Reception ==
In a starred review, Publishers Weekly called the novel "cleverly structured like a jigsaw puzzle", writing, "A senseless tragedy, splashes of levity, and unexpected poignancy bring this to a moving conclusion. Veronesi's dark modern chronicle shimmers with intelligence and flashes of pathos."

Kirkus Reviews called it an "intriguing but ultimately disappointing experiment in fictional biography" and criticised Veronesi's depictions of women.

In 2020, the novel won the prestigious Strega Prize. Veronesi previously won the Strega in 2006 for his novel Caos calmo

== Film adaptation ==
The novel has been adapted into a film of the same name by director Francesca Archibugi. The film stars Pierfrancesco Favino as Marco, Bérénice Bejo as Luisa, Kasia Smutniak as Marina and Benedetta Porcaroli as Adele.
