= Caravaggio's Shadow =

2022 Italian biographical film

- Directed by: Michele Placido
- Screenplay by: Sandro Petraglia; Michele Placido; Fidel Signorile
- Produced by: Federica Vincenti
- Starring: Riccardo Scamarcio; Louis Garrel; Isabelle Huppert; Micaela Ramazzotti; Tedua; Vinicio Marchioni; Lolita Chammah; Michele Placido
- Cinematography: Michele D'Attanasio
- Edited by: Consuelo Catucci
- Music by: Umberto Iervolino
- Production company: Goldenart Production
- Distributed by: 01 Distribution
- Release date: October 18, 2022 (Rome Film Festival)
- Running time: 120 min.
- Countries: Italy; France
- Language: Italian

Caravaggio's Shadow (Italian: L'ombra di Caravaggio) is a 2022 Italian-French biographical historical drama film directed by Michele Placido and starring Riccardo Scamarcio as artist Caravaggio.

== Plot ==
In 1610 in Italy, Michelangelo Merisi, better known as Caravaggio, is considered a brilliant artist. He opposes church dogma, which dictates how religious subjects should be depicted in art. When Pope Paul V learns that Caravaggio uses prostitutes, thieves and vagabonds as models for his paintings, he orders an investigation into the artist by the Vatican secret service. The results of the investigation will determine whether Caravaggio's request to be pardoned from his death sentence for the murder of a rival will succeed. The lead investigator, known as "Shadow", reveals the contradictory vices and virtues of Caravaggio.

== Cast ==
- Riccardo Scamarcio as Caravaggio
- Louis Garrel as Schatten
- Isabelle Huppert as Costanza Sforza Colonna
- Micaela Ramazzotti as Lena Antonietti
- Lolita Chammah as Anna Bianchini
- Vinicio Marchioni as Giovanni Baglione
- Gianfranco Gallo as Giordano Bruno
- Moni Ovadia as Filippo Neri
- Michele Placido as Cardinal Francesco Maria del Monte
- Tedua as Cecco
- Maurizio Donadoni as Pope Paul V
- Lea Gavino as Artemisia Gentileschi

== Reception ==
=== Critical response ===
Davide Stanzione in Best Movie assigns the film 3.3 stars out of 5 and speaks of it as: "A surprising, bruised and sensual film, which manages to reproduce the works of Caravaggio within the visual fabric of the images and restores, with more cursed vigor than stumble, the torrid demons of a boundless artist, torn between the torment of the body and the ecstasy of the sacred".

According to Zinaida Pronchenko, "Placido does not try to diversify the usual narrative — he drank, copulated, transferred to the canvas — with conceptual solutions, as, for example, Derek Jarman in his 1986 Caravaggio. Which is rather good".

As Vittoria Scarpa (Сineuropa) notes, "One of the film’s strengths is its demonstration of how aspects of reality entered into the painter’s works, how thieves, vagabonds and harlots appeared on the artist’s canvasses, as if on stage, transformed into eternal works of art".

=== Accolades ===
The film received five nominations for the 2023 David di Donatello - Best Cinematography, Best Costumes, Best Make-up, Best Hairstyling, and David Youth Award. It won Best Hairstyling and the David Youth Award.

== Sources ==
According to a study by Vincenzo Pacelli, professor at the University of Naples, supported by documents from the State Archives and the Vatican Archives, Caravaggio did not die of illness in Porto Ercole, Tuscany, in July 1610, but of a violent death in Palo, Lazio, with the "tacit consent of the Roman Curia."

== See also ==
- List of Italian films of 2022
