= Andrea Lodovichetti =

Italian film director and screenwriter (born 1976)

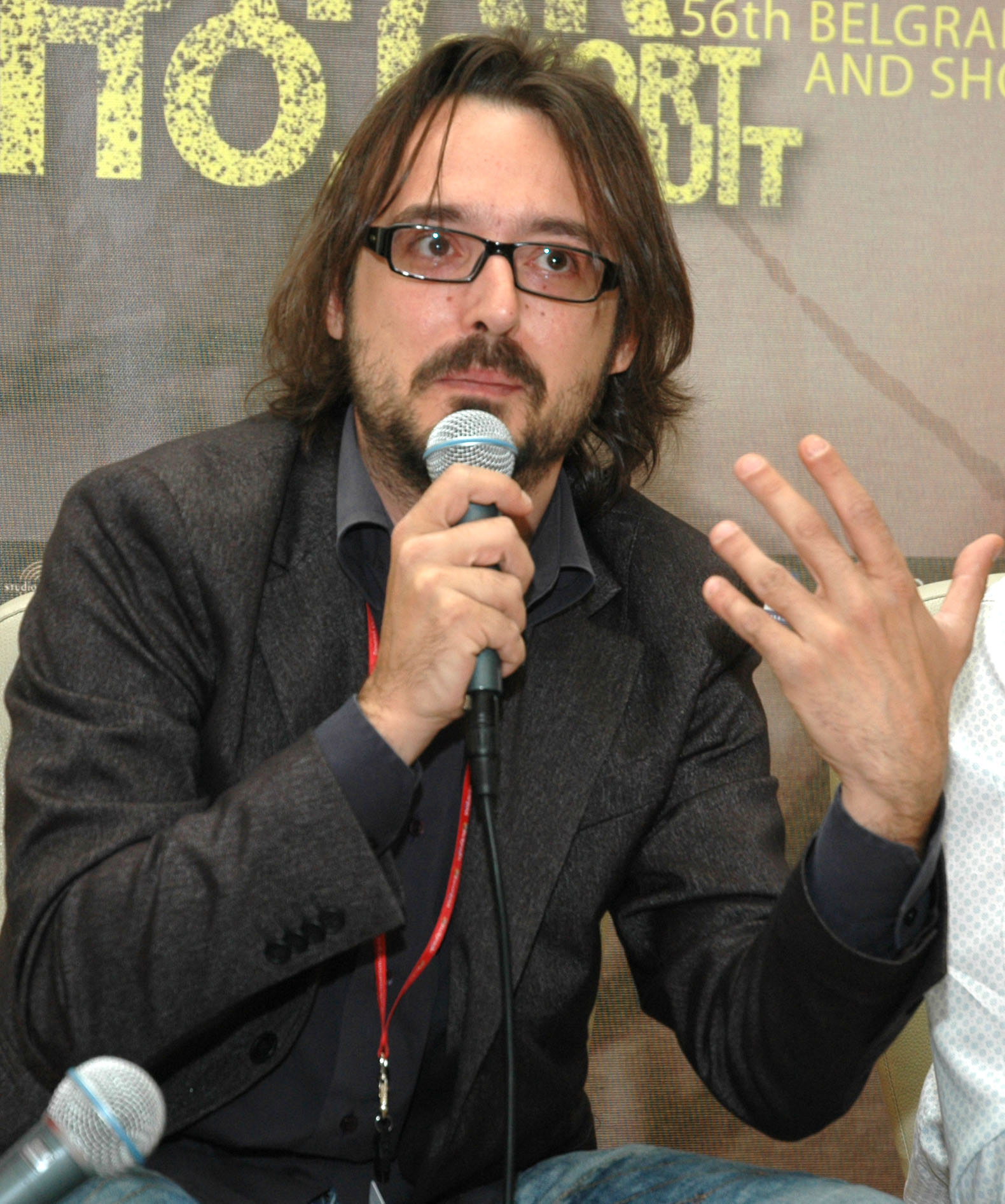
- Born: 28 September 1976 (age 49); Fano, Italy
- Education: Centro Sperimentale di Cinematografia
- Occupations: Film director, screenwriter
- Years active: 2002–present

Andrea Lodovichetti (born 28 September 1976) is an Italian film director and screenwriter.

== Life and career ==
Born in Fano, Italy, he currently lives in New York. In 2006 he got a degree in film directing at the National School of Film Centro Sperimentale di Cinematografia. His first short-movie is Director's cut – segmenti di una notte (2002). After that, he produced, edited and directed Untitled – Storie senza nome: this work won some national awards, like the Jury's prize in a contest named Autogrill al Cinema, by Autogrill e Cinecittà Holding. The award ceremony took place in July 2003 at the Festival dei Due Mondi in Spoleto, Italy.

The same year, he made L'amore. Quasi. (Oppure no). This short comedy features the comedian Alessandra Faiella.

Within the first two years at the Centro Sperimentale di Cinematografia he shot some shorts, filmed in 35mm: Fragile (2005) with Luigi Diberti and Il Diavolo (2006), inspired by a novel written by Guy de Maupassant, featuring Angela Goodwin and Pietro Bontempo. This short has been screened and awarded in many festival, like the Festival del cinema di Salerno (2007).

In 2006 and 2008 he worked as assistant director for the Academy Award-winning director Paolo Sorrentino in the movies The Family Friend and Il divo.

in 2007, Noëlle Benhamou wrote an article about this short and its author, named "Il diavolo (2005) d'Andrea Lodovichetti: du conte noir à la fable métaphysique“.

=== Sotto il mio giardino, short movie ===
In 2007, he shot his thesys at the Centro Sperimentale di Cinematografia. The title of the short is Sotto il mio giardino a.k.a. Under my garden based on a novel by Roberto Santini. This short has been awarded many times in festivals all around the world. Beside the Italian Golden Globe Globo d'oro, won in the best short category, he won the Babelgum Online Film Festival (2008) with the prize "looking for a genius award". The jury was headed by Spike Lee, and the ceremony took place in Cannes.

In three years, achieved about 30 international awards in many festivals, like the Beijing Student Film Festival (2008), the Rhode Island International Film Festival, the Fike International Film Festival (2009), the Giffoni film festival (2008), the Buffalo Niagara Film Festival (2010), the Berkeley Video and Film Festival (2009), the Fort Collins TriMedia Festival (2009), the Garden State Film Festival (2009), the Seattle True Independent Film Festival (2009), the Golden Knight Malta International Film Festival 2009.

Some official selections, also, like Festival di Tangeri 2008 (Morocco), Sleepwalkers Film Fest 2008 (Estonia), Valley Film Festival 2009 (USA), Olympia Film Fest 2009 (Greek), In The Palace 2009 (Bulgary), MediaWave Festival 2009 (Hungary), Las Palmas Film Fest 2009 (Canary Island), Mar De Plata Film Festival 2009 (Argentina), San Joaquin Society 2009 (USA), il Las Vegas International Film Festival 2009 (USA), il Radical Frame Film Fest 2010 (Germany), Detroit Independent Film Festival 2011 (USA).

=== Documentaries ===
In 2012 he produced and directed In viaggio per un sorriso – Tour Spagna 2012 and in 2014 Missione Ruanda, about the activities of the Ngo Sports Around The World in Africa. This work won the Festival internazionale del Cinema Sportivo 2014 Sport Movies & TV - Milano International FICTS Fest and theOvertime Film Festival (2015).

=== Other ===
In 2013 the New York magazine UCAN! published an article about him.

In 2014 the CEO of the social network Stage 32 Richard Botto asked him for an article about his experience with the Academy Awards winner director Paolo Sorrentino.

== Filmography ==
Short movies:

- Director's Cut – Segmenti di una notte (2002)
- Untitled – Storie senza nome (2003)
- L’amore. Quasi. Oppure no (2004)
- Fragile (2005)
- Il Diavolo (2006)
- Sotto il mio giardino (2007)

Documentaries:

- In viaggio per un sorriso – Tour Spagna 2012 (2012)
- Sports around the World – Missione Ruanda (2014)
