= Aldo Braibanti =

Italian writer and artist (1922–2014)

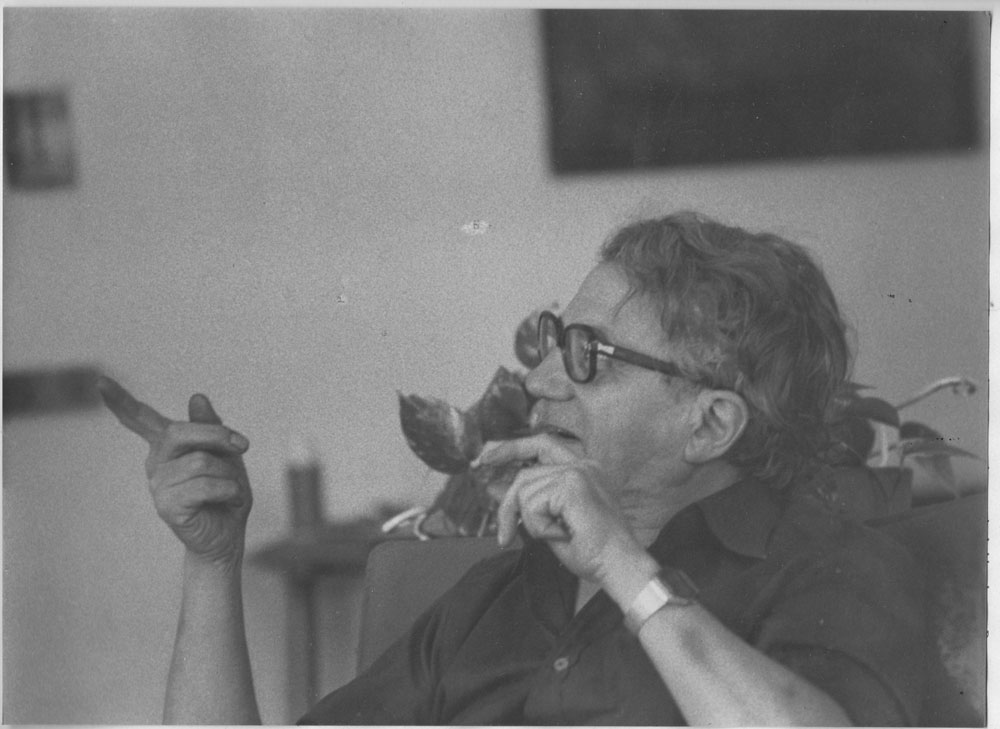
Image of Aldo Braibanti

Aldo Braibanti (17 September 1922 – 6 April 2014) was an Italian poet, essayist, screenwriter, playwright, director, and visual artist. A communist and anti-fascist, he fought as a partisan in the Italian Resistance, returning to his intellectual pursuits after the war. He dedicated himself to visual arts, cinema, theater, and literature, and to myrmecology and ecology.

== Biography ==
=== Early life and education ===
Born in Fiorenzuola d'Arda on 17 September 1922, Braibanti spent his childhood in Fiorenzuola d'Arda, near Piacenza. His father was a local doctor and he often accompanied him to house calls in the province of Piacenza. Soon Aldo discovered the centrality of the natural world and developed a strong interest in ecology and environmental protection. He was fascinated by animal life, and in particular the behavior of social insects: ants, bees, and termites. While growing up under Italian fascism, he enjoyed "an enlightened family firm in its opposition to any authoritarian and clerical impositions".

Between the ages of seven and eight, Braibanti began to write his first poetic texts. While in school, he developed an early interest for poets including Dante Alighieri, Francesco Petrarca, Giosuè Carducci, Giovanni Pascoli, and Gabriele D'Annunzio, and even more fervently for Giacomo Leopardi and Ugo Foscolo. At this time, he began his poetic activity, immediately abandoning rhyme and stylistic traditions to write in free verse. Soon he engaged in his first theatrical experiment, Amneris, his first philosophical dialogues, The Vigil of the Mountain, and his first hymns to nature.

From 1937 to 1940, Braibanti attended the Liceo Classico Romagnosi in Parma. Because of his academic excellence he was exempted from paying school taxes. On 27 November 1939, he wrote and secretly distributed a manifesto urging his high school companions to unite and organize against the fascist dictatorship. After high school, he moved to Florence where he entered the university to study philosophy. His love for Leonardo da Vinci, Giordano Bruno, and above all Baruch Spinoza was born. He began to produce collages and assemblages with found objects. His interest and study of the life of ants progressively became a rigorous scientific pursuit.

=== Florence and the Italian Resistance ===
After World War II broke out, Braibanti began to seek contact with dissenting intellectuals and the anti-fascists of Giustizia e Libertà, many of them being exiled in France. In 1943, he joined the clandestine Italian Communist Party (PCI), together with Gianfranco Sarfatti, Teresa (Chicchi) Mattei, Renzo Bussotti, and others. His choices were motivated by a convergence of political and social interest: "Unlike Giustizia e Libertà, the Communist Party, was above all the party of the working class and bore the most significant weight in the class struggle ... Coming from a different social class, I wanted to partake in the anti-fascist struggle starting precisely from the urgent needs of the workers."

Braibanti was arrested twice by the fascists. The first time was in 1943 following a raid that involved the future Italian Republican Party secretary Ugo La Malfa. He was released from prison on 25 July after Benito Mussolini was deposed. The second arrest took place in 1944, together with Sandro Susini, Mario Spinella, and Zemiro Melas (Emilio), by the Banda Carità, a notoriously violent fascists militia. All his writings up to 1940 were seized by the Italian SS troops and were lost forever.

=== Post-war years ===
In 1946, Braibanti was among the organizers of the World Youth Festival, which took place the following year in Prague, and became head of the Tuscan Communist Youth. In 1947, he abandoned active politics by resigning from his posts with a poem published in the magazine Il Ponte which began with the phrase "it is not a farewell but a farewell." He declined the invitation to return to the PCI, stating: "I am not a politician." In the post-war period, Braibanti obtained his degree in theoretical philosophy with a thesis on the concept of the grotesque, "understood as a crisis of the ideal, and therefore as a middle ground between the tragic and the comic".

=== Artistic laboratory of Castell'Arquato ===
The renunciation of politics coincides with the decision to dedicate himself to art. In 1947, Braibanti began an artist commune at the Farnese tower of Castell'Arquato where he created an art laboratory with Renzo Bussotti and Sylvano Bussotti, Roberto G. Salvadori, Fiorenzo Giorgi. That experience lasted six years, in which poems, theater, visual works, and ceramic were created in a collaborative fashion. The works of the Farnese tower were exhibited at the Milan Triennale of 1953 and at avant-garde galleries in Europe. At the tower, Braibanti finally devoted himself to poetry, to writing plays, to screenplays. He also continued his study of the life of ants, built artificial anthills, and established a deep contact with the ecological reality of the time. The texts collected in the four volumes of Il Circo (Atta, 1960) date back to that period. He began his first film project Pochi stracci prima del sole, which remained unfinished. Years later, it will find a continuation in the films Orizzonte degli eventi, Morphing and in the screenplays Il pianeta difronte and Conversazioni con un chicco di riso. Eventually, the Christian Democratic administration of Castell'Arquato did not renew the lease for the tower, bringing the commune to an end.

=== Years in Rome ===
In 1956, Braibanti participated in the work for the national congress of the PCI with a highly contested speech concerning aspects of Stalinism that he opposed. Braibanti thus renounced his political affiliation with the party while maintaining friendly relations with his old comrades of the Resistance.

In 1960, Eugenio Cassin, whom Braibanti had met during the period of the Florentine Resistance, distributed through Schwarz Editore the four volumes Il Circo (poems, essays, plays) and Guida per un'esposizione. Braibanti also translated Christopher Columbus's travel diary into Italian (Schwarz 1960). In 1962 he moved to Rome and began working as a theater director. He worked with the young Carmelo Bene, resumed collaborations with Sylvano Bussotti and Vittorio Gelmetti. Together with the brothers Giorgio and Marco Bellocchio, he took part in the founding of the journal Quaderni Piacentini. The partnership with Gelmetti resumed for the radio version of his theatrical work Le Ballate dell'Anticrate broadcast by Radio 3 in 1979.

Between 1967 and 1968, Braibanti worked at a complex theatrical operation entitled Virulentia Virulentia exploring the relationship between persuasion and violence, and between overt persuasion and hidden persuasion". In the author's words, it was "a chain of monographic shows ... which in the end would result in the game of mirrors of a film script. Each installment of Virulentia took place in different non-theatrical spaces as a series of tableaux vivants, in which deconcentration and meditation produced a series of 'percorsi liberi', through which the text was finally recomposed."

In those years, both the Living Theater and Grotowski's Laboratory Theatre performed regularly in Italy. Their work, though very different from Braibanti's had a lasting impact on his language and on creating situations where words played a gestural role. Virulentia occasioned a film, Transfert per camera verso Virulentia, in collaboration with Alberto Grifi, and a series of essays entitled Impresa dei prolegomeni acratici. In 1967, he held an exhibition of assemblages with Giampaolo Berto in Rome. In 1974, Braibanti wrote the lyrics of The Sheep Who Wanted to be a Horse for Maria Monti's LP Il Bestiario, a ground-breaking electro-acoustic project arranged by Alvin Curran. The album was rereleased in 2018 by UnseeWorlds and was praised as "a near perfect emblem of the fascinating territory gained through collaboration... [with] the radical poet Aldo Braibanti as its lyricist, arrangements and synthesizer from Alvin Curran (Musica Elettronica Viva), the baritone saxophone of Roberto Laneri (Prima Materia), as well as the soprano saxophone of jazz legend Steve Lacy."

=== Braibanti trial ===
In Rome, Braibanti continued his cultural and artistic activities collaborating with his friend Giovanni Sanfratello, a 23-year-old man he had met during the period in Castell'Arquato: "I moved to Rome, and Giovanni Sanfratello accompanied me, because by coming to Rome he could better defend himself from the pressures of his father, due to religious, ideological and political differences. The Sanfratellos, from Piacenza, were ultra-conservative and could not accept that their son could choose a life so different from their own".

On 12 October 1964, Ippolito Sanfratello, Giovanni's father, filed a complaint with the Rome Public Prosecutor against Braibanti. The accusation was plagio, i.e., mental manipulation or psychological subjugation, a crime introduced by the fascist legal code. Braibanti was accused of "enslaving the mind of another man for his evil purposes.” During the investigative phase, Giovanni's family had the young man (who was legally of age) forcefully abducted, locked up in a psychiatric hospital, and subjected to multiple electric and insulin shocks. He was kept in isolation from friends and lawyers. Despite such violent treatment, he refused to accuse Braibanti or admit to having received physical or psychological coercion. Giovanni was discharged after 15 months of internment, with a series of clauses that ranged from the obligatory domicile in his parents' home to the prohibition of reading books that were less than a hundred years old. In spite of everything, Giovanni Sanfratello declared at the trial that he "had not been subjugated by Braibanti."

The preparation for the trial lasted four years and the trial became a public spectacle; with Braibanti in handcuffs, the prosecutor cross-examined a series of witnesses intending to demonize every aspect of his life. Nothing was spared: his philosophical ideas, artistic activity, political convictions, scientific research, as well as his physical appearance. Braibanti was sentenced to nine years in prison, reduced to four on appeal. He served two years in prison, and two were condoned for his participation in the Resistance. He was scapegoated as a communist, a former partisan, as well as a homosexual, and according to some authors and the 2022 biographical film Il signore delle formiche, even by segments of the official left that viewed homosexuality as a "petty bourgeois degeneration". In fact, l'Unità, the official organ of the PCI, openly took a position in favour of Braibanti and against the sentence, so much so that the day after the ruling it published an editorial by its director, the former partisan Maurizio Ferrara, in which the obscurantist climate in which the trial had taken place was denounced in no uncertain terms. Paolo Gambescia, the reporter from l'Unità who followed the case, was not only strongly supported by the direction of the newspaper but continued to work profitably for many years after the closure of the case.

Braibanti was considered indefensible and a living proof that the communists corrupted Italian youth and traditional family values. His sentence had a great echo in the international press, highlighting the profound anomaly of the contested crime and the way it was handled by the Italian procedural system. The controversial law on mental manipulation that was part of the fascist penal code led to only this one sentence, only in the postwar period. It was subsequently abolished, thanks in part to the heated debate triggered by Braibanti's conviction. The trial quickly revealed its political nature, proposing itself as the last attempt of the old social order to impose its own values against the rising tide of 1968. The sentence aroused wide echo throughout Italy: Alberto Moravia, Umberto Eco, Pier Paolo Pasolini, Marco Bellocchio, Adolfo Gatti, Giuseppe Chiari, and numerous other intellectuals in favor of Braibanti. The Radical Party led by Marco Pannella was particularly vocal in expressing outrage.

=== Prison years and works from 1971 ===
In prison, Braibanti continued his activity as a poet, he wrote a play L'altra ferita a psychological retelling of Sophocles' Philoctetes, staged by Franco Enriquez in 1970, with electronic music by Pietro Grossi and sets by Emanuele Luzzati. Other writings were included in the collection of essays published in 1970, by Virginia Finzi-Ghisi, titled Le Prigioni di Stato. Released from prison, Braibanti resumed his work on Virulentia, but soon abandoned it for a new theatrical cycle, called Le ballate dell'Anticrate. While laboring through his theatrical activities, he began writing and directing multi-installment radio drama: Lo scandalo dell'imaginazione (1979) and Le stanze di Azoth both broadcast by RAI 3. Subsequent theatrical works were presented once, as Braibanti began to question the repeatability of performances. This was the case for Il Mercatino, staged in Cagliari in the seventies, the Theatri epistola, presented in Segni in the 1980s. In 1979, on the occasion of an exhibition of assemblages in Florence, he published the catalog Objets trouvés. Shortly after, he contributed seven proses to the magazine Legenda.

In the Impresa dei prolegomeni acratici (Editrice 28, 1988), Braibanti explored various themes including historical criticism and a re-foundation of pedagogy. The main thrust of the book emerges from his own presentation: “I describe the development crisis that brought me out of classical psychoanalysis, and directed me towards a more strictly biological interpretation of behavior" [21]. Among its many facets, the Impresa dei prolegomeni acratici points to the crisis of language. "Language is a photograph of man. Like man, all words are born, live and die."

In 1985, Braibanti wrote the screenplay for the film Blu cobalto directed by Gianfranco Fiore Donati and the interpretation of Anna Bonaiuto and Enrico Ghezzi. The film, presented at the Venice Film Festival, received an award from the Fice (Italian Federation of Arthouse Cinema). During the same years, he made the video L'orizzonte degli eventi. In 1991, Braibanti published Pilgrimage to Rijnsburg in the music section of the Venice Biennale. In 1998, Un giallo o mille was released with poetic texts and collages. In 2001, Frammento Frammenti (Empirìa editions) collected most of his poems from 1941 to 2001.

In 2003, Braibanti wrote Emergenze and Conversations, which was published by Vicolo del Pavone, a long dialogue with Stefano Raffo in which Braibanti traces his life and his work as a libertarian thinker: "I call libertarian those who do not take refuge in a theory of values, and succeed without the anguish to always question everything. ... Every knowledge worthy of this name moves, through selective memory, towards the interminable prairies of the unknown, drastically denying any temptation to unknowability. It follows total relativity of every truth, of every ethics, of every aesthetic. Ethics and knowledge are identified in respect and defense of life."

=== Last years and death ===
In 2005, Braibanti was evicted from his house in via del Portico di Ottavia in Rome, where he had lived for forty years. It was an old apartment in the area where the Jewish ghetto had been. In 2006, following a parliamentary inquiry on his living conditions, he received an annuity according to the Bacchelli law. In 2008, Braibanti was ordered to leave his apartment with all his belongings and a sizable library. With the help of his family, he spent the last few years in Castell'Arquato, trying to complete new works, Catalogo degli amuleti, the Nuovo dizionario delle idee correnti, and the feature-length video Quasi niente. He died in Castell'Arquato of cardiac arrest on 6 April 2014; he was 91.

== Works about Braibanti ==
After his death, many of Braibanti's students and collaborators began to collect his works and make it public. Braibanti's life-long involvement with ecology attracted new interest to his work. His poetry and multimedia work began to reappear in theaters. In 2015, Riccardo Frattolillo wrote his thesis on Braibanti's work at the University of Rome La Sapienza. The thesis became a book un 2018, published by Annales and the author presented some of Braibanti's works at the Teatro Vascello in Rome.

In 2016, Patrizia Pacini published a long conversation with Braibanti under the title, Fuori tempo, Intervista ad Aldo Braibanti, Carmignani Editrice, Cascian 2016. In 2020, Carmen Giardina and Massimiliano Palmese directed a documentary on Braibanti's trial. The film was awarded one of Italy's most prestigious prizes, the Nastro d'Argento. The Italian film director Gianni Amelio is about to release a full-length fiction on Aldo Braibanti entitled Lord of the Ants and produced by Rai Cinema.

== Published works ==
- Il circo e altri scritti, 4 volumes (collection of plays, poems, essays), Atta, Rome, 1960
- Guida per esposizione, Atta, Rome, 1960
- Le prigioni di Stato, Feltrinelli, Milan, 1969
- Objet trouvé, Exhibition catalogue. Stamperia della Bezuga, Florence, 1979
- Impresa dei prolegomeni acratici, Editrice 28, Rome, 1989
- Un giallo o mille, Le cartelle di Giano, Rome, 1998
- Pellegrinaggio a Rijnsburg, Catalogue of the Venice Biennale, Venice, 1991
- Frammento/Frammenti: 1941-2003, Empiria Editions, Rome 2003

== Translations ==
- Christopher Columbus, Giornale di Bordo, Schwarz, Milan 1960 - translation from the Spanish

== Film ==
- Transfert per camera verso Virulentia, directed by Alberto Grifi
- L'orizzonte degli eventi, short film, direction and screenplay
- Il pianeta di fronte, screenplay
- Colloqui con un chicco di riso, screenplay
- Morphing, direction and screenplay, with animations by Leonardo Carrano, 1995
- Blu cobalto, screenplay, directed by Gianfranco Fiore Donati, with Anna Bonaiuto and Enrico Ghezzi, 1985

== Radio ==
- Lo scandalo dell'immaginazione, written and directed for Radio Rai3
- Le ballate dell'Anticrate, written and directed for Radio Rai3
- Le stanze di Azoth, written and directed for Radio Rai 3
- La capsula del tempo (never recorded but the text exists)

== Magazines and journals ==
- Imprinting. Sperimentazione e linguaggio 1975–79
- La civiltà delle macchine
- Marcatré
- Quaderni Piacentini
- Sipario
- Aut-Trib 17139
- Legenda

== Bibliography ==
- Stefano Raffo e Aldo Braibanti, Emergenze. Conversazioni con Aldo Braibanti, Piacenza, Vicolo del Pavone, 2003.
- La sentenza Braibanti, trial proceedings, De Donato, Bari 1969.
- Alberto Moravia, Umberto Eco, Adolfo Gatti, Mario Gozzano, Cesare Musatti, Ginevra Bompiani, Sotto il nome di plagio, Bompiani, Milano 1969. Essays of a group of Italian intellectuals in support of Aldo Braibanti during the trial.
- Libérez Braibanti!: suivi de Tartuffe et Dom Juan, Jean Pierre Schweitzer, Aldo Braibanti, les amis de Jules Bonnot, 1971.
- Umberto Eco, Il costume di casa. Evidenze e misteri dell'ideologia italiana negli anni sessanta, Bompiani, Milano, 2012.
- Virginia Finzi Ghisi, Il caso Braibanti ovvero un processo di famiglia, Feltrinelli, Milano, 1969.
- Gabriele Ferluga, Il processo Braibanti, Silvio Zamorani editore, Torino 2003.
- Andrea Pini, Quando eravamo froci. Gli omosessuali nell'Italia di una volta, 2011.
- Patrizia Pacini, Fuori tempo. Intervista ad Aldo Braibanti, Carmignani Editrice, Cascina, 2016.
- Riccardo Frattolillo, Il teatro di Aldo Braibanti. Il pellegrinaggio di un dilettante leonardesco tra scritti, formiche e opere. Annales 2018.
