= Dry (2022 film) =

2022 film by Paolo Virzì

- Italian: Siccità
- Directed by: Paolo Virzì
- Screenplay by: Paolo Giordano
- Produced by: Mario Gianani; Lorenzo Gangarossa; Lorenzo Mieli
- Starring: Silvio Orlando; Valerio Mastandrea; Elena Lietti; Tommaso Ragno; Claudia Pandolfi; Vinicio Marchioni; Monica Bellucci; Diego Ribon; Max Tortora; Emanuela Fanelli; Gabriel Montesi; Sara Serraiocco
- Cinematography: Luca Bigazzi
- Edited by: Jacopo Quadri
- Music by: Franco Piersanti
- Production company: Wildside
- Distributed by: Vision Distribution
- Release dates: 8 September 2022 (Venice); 29 September 2022 (Italy)
- Running time: 124 minutes
- Country: Italy
- Language: Italian
- Box office: $1.8 million

Dry (Italian: Siccità) is a 2022 Italian apocalyptic comedy film directed by Paolo Virzì, from a screenplay by Paolo Giordano. The film features an ensemble cast which includes Silvio Orlando, Valerio Mastandrea, Sara Serraiocco and Monica Bellucci.

The film had its world premiere at the 79th Venice International Film Festival on 8 September 2022 and was first theatrically released in Italy on 29 September 2022.

== Synopsis ==
In a dystopian present, it hasn't rained in Rome for three years and a series of characters must cope with the drought that has reduced water reserves to a minimum and with an epidemic of sleeping sickness carried by cockroaches.

== Cast ==
- Silvio Orlando as Antonio
- Valerio Mastandrea as Loris
- Elena Lietti as Mila
- Tommaso Ragno as Alfredo
- Claudia Pandolfi as Sara
- Vinicio Marchioni as Luca
- Monica Bellucci as Valentina
- Diego Ribon as Professor Del Vecchio
- Max Tortora as Jacopucci
- Emanuela Fanelli as Raffaella Zarate
- Gabriel Montesi as Valerio
- Sara Serraiocco as Giulia
- Emma Fasano as Martina
- Emanuele Maria Di Stefano as Sebastiano
- Malich Cissé as Sembene
- Paola Tiziana Cruciani as Loris' mother
- Gianni Di Gregorio as Loris' father
- Andrea Renzi as the President
- Giovanni Franzoni as Filippo
- Federico D'Ovidio as Lino
- Lorenzo Gioielli as Corrado Zarate
- Sara Lazzaro as Rose
- Edoardo Purgatori as Pierluigi
- Federico Maria Sardelli as the conductor

== Production ==
Principal photography began on 17 February 2021, in Rome, Italy. The film entered post-production in May 2021.

== Release ==
The film premiered at the 79th Venice International Film Festival on 8 September 2022. Its first theatrical release was in Italy on 29 September 2022.

== Reception ==
Dry grossed a worldwide total of $1.8 million.

== See also ==
- List of Italian films of 2022
