= The Hummingbird (2022 film) =

2022 Italian drama film

- Theatrical release poster
- Italian: Il colibrì
- Directed by: Francesca Archibugi
- Screenplay by: Francesca Archibugi; Laura Paolucci; Francesco Piccolo
- Based on: The Hummingbird by Sandro Veronesi
- Produced by: Domenico Procacci; Anne-Dominique Toussaint
- Starring: Pierfrancesco Favino; Kasia Smutniak; Bérénice Bejo; Nanni Moretti; Laura Morante
- Cinematography: Luca Bigazzi
- Edited by: Esemeralda Calabria
- Music by: Battista Lena
- Production companies: Fandango; Rai Cinema
- Distributed by: 01 Distribution
- Release dates: 13 October 2022 (Rome); 14 October 2022 (Italy)
- Running time: 126 minutes
- Country: Italy
- Language: Italian
- Box office: $3.1 million

The Hummingbird (Italian: Il colibrì) is a 2022 Italian drama film directed by Francesca Archibugi, who also co-wrote the screenplay.

The film is an adaptation of the 2019 novel of the same name by Sandro Veronesi. It premiered at the 17th Rome Film Festival on 13 October 2022. It was theatrically released in Italy the following day.

== Cast ==
- Pierfrancesco Favino as Marco Carrera
- Kasia Smutniak as Marina Molitor
- Bérénice Bejo as Luisa Lattes
- Laura Morante as Letizia Carrera
- Sergio Albelli as Probo Carrera
- Alessandro Tedeschi as Giacomo Carrera
- Benedetta Porcaroli as Adele Carrera
- Massimo Ceccherini as Duccio Chilleri
- Fotinì Peluso as Irene Carrera
- Francesco Centorame as young Marco Carrera
- Pietro Ragusa as Luigi Dami Tamburini
- Valeria Cavalli as Luisa's mother
- Nanni Moretti as Daniele Carradori

== Reception ==
On Rotten Tomatoes, the film has a 71% approval rating based on 7 reviews, and an average rating of 6.5/10.
