= Antoni Cossu =

Sardinian novelist and poet

Antoni Cossu (1927–2002) was a Sardinian novelist and poet. He studied literature in Milan before returning to Sardinia in 1959. For a time he also edited the periodical Il Montiferru.

== Biography ==
He was born in Santu Lussurgiu, where he attended elementary school and middle school, followed by high school at “De Castro” in Oristano. He graduated with a degree in Literature from the University of Milan, where he had always been interested in cultural and social issues. He found employment as a teacher at a prestigious high school in Rome. From 1953 to 1958, he worked for the political party Community Movement, founded and led by Adriano Olivetti. In 1954, he moved to Ivrea, the party headquarters, and remained there until 1958. From 1959, he worked in the Department for the Rebirth of the Region of Sardinia and later in the Planning Center, until 1992. A contributor to many magazines with literary writings and investigations, he was, together with Diego Are, the promoter and editor of the magazines “Il Montiferru,” “Il Bogino,” and “La grotta della vipera.” He died in Santu Lussurgiu on July 2, 2002.
