= Francesco Pegoretti =

Italian make-up artist

- Occupation: Make-up artist
- Years active: 2004–present

Francesco Pegoretti is an Italian make-up artist. He was nominated for an Academy Award in the category Best Makeup and Hairstyling for the film Pinocchio. The son of hairstylist Alberta Pegoretti, he also won two David di Donatello Awards, in 2016 for Tale of Tales and in 2021 for Pinocchio.

== Selected filmography ==
- Virginia, la monaca di Monza (2004)
- My Brother Is an Only Child (2007)
- Purple Sea (2009)
- The Big Dream (2009)
- La nostra vita (2010)
- Barabbas (2012)
- Anna Karenina (2012)
- Romeo & Juliet (2013)
- White as Milk, Red as Blood (2013)
- Siberian Education (2013)
- Hercules (2014)
- Tale of Tales (2015)
- Ben-Hur (2016)
- The Young Messiah (2016)
- Naples in Veils (2017)
- Black Butterfly (2017)
- Beirut (2018)
- The Happy Prince (2018)
- Pinocchio (2019; Academy Award co-nominated with Dalia Colli and Mark Coulier)
- Chevalier (2022)
- Napoleon (2023)
- Finally Dawn (2023)
- Conclave (2024)
- William Tell (2024)
