= Corro da te =

2022 Italian comedy film

- Poster
- Directed by: Riccardo Milani
- Written by: Furio Andreotti; Giulia Calenda; Riccardo Milani
- Starring: Pierfrancesco Favino; Miriam Leone
- Cinematography: Saverio Guarna
- Edited by: Patrizia Ceresani; Francesco Renda
- Music by: Piernicola Di Muro
- Release date: March 17, 2022
- Running time: 113 minutes
- Country: Italy
- Language: Italian

Corro da te (lit. 'Run to You') is a 2022 Italian romantic comedy film directed by Riccardo Milani.

It is a remake of the 2018 French film Rolling to You (Tout le monde debout).

== Cast ==
- Pierfrancesco Favino as Gianni
- Miriam Leone as Chiara
- Vanessa Scalera as Luciana
- Pilar Fogliati as Alessia
- Piera Degli Esposti as Chiara and Alessia's grandmother
- Michele Placido as Gianni's father
- Carlo De Ruggieri as Gianni's brother
- Giulio Base as Gianni's friend
- Cesare Capitani as Gianni's friend
- Pietro Sermonti as Dario the doctor
- Andrea Pennacchi as the priest in Lourdes

== Release ==
The first trailer was released on 11 January 2022. The film was released in Italy on 17 March 2022.
