= September (2022 film) =

2022 comedy-drama film

- Directed by: Giulia Steigerwalt
- Screenplay by: Giulia Steigerwalt
- Produced by: Matteo Rovere
- Starring: Barbara Ronchi; Fabrizio Bentivoglio; Thony
- Cinematography: Vladan Radovic
- Edited by: Gianni Vezzosi
- Music by: Michele Braga
- Distributed by: 01 Distribution
- Release date: 2022
- Running time: 110 minutes
- Country: Italy
- Language: Italian

September (Italian: Settembre) is a 2022 Italian comedy-drama film written and directed by Giulia Steigerwalt, in her directorial debut.

== Cast ==
- Barbara Ronchi as Francesca
- Fabrizio Bentivoglio as Guglielmo
- Thony as Debora
- Andrea Sartoretti as Alberto
- Tesa Litvan as Ana
- Enrico Borello as Matteo
- Margherita Rebeggiani as Maria
- Luca Nozzoli as Sergio
- Arianna Ascoli as Simona
- Michele Enrico Montesano as Stefano Carracci

== Production ==
The film was conceived by Steigerwalt during her time at University of California, Los Angeles. It is based upon the Steigerwalt's 2019 short film with the same name.

== Release ==
The film premiered at the Bari International Film Festival, and was released in Italian cinemas on 5 May 2022.

== Reception ==
The film won two David di Donatello Awards, for best actress (Ronchi) and best new director (Steigerwalt). Steigerwalt was also awarded the Silver Ribbon in the same category.
