= Giulia Steigerwalt =

Italian actress (born 1982)

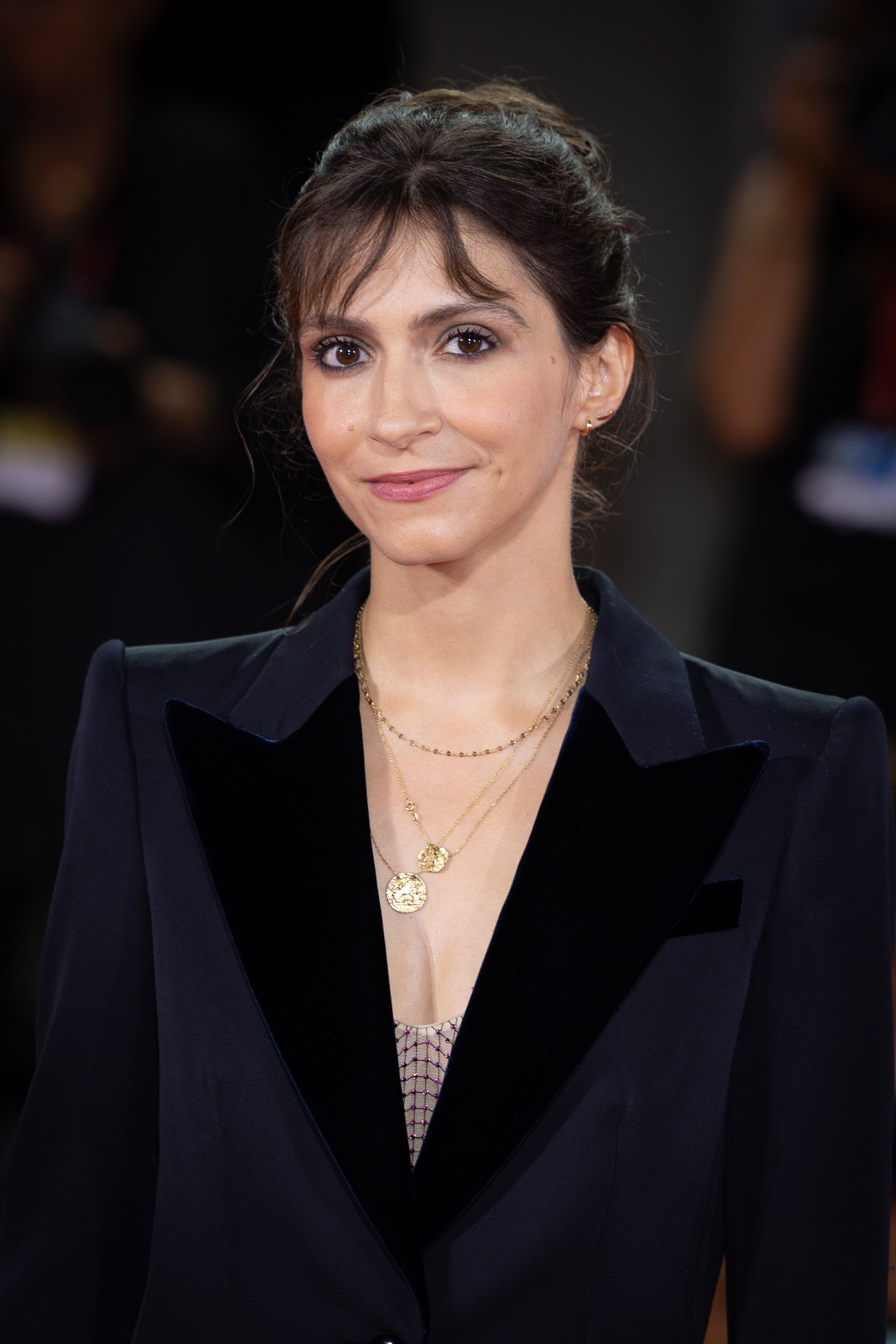
- Steigerwalt at the 2024 Venice Film Festival
- Born: 13 April 1982 (age 43); Houston, Texas, United States
- Occupations: Screenwriter; Director; Actress

Giulia Louise Steigerwalt (born 13 April 1982) is an American-born Italian screenwriter, director, and former actress.

== Life and career ==
Born in Houston, Texas, United States, the daughter of a psychologist mother, Steigerwalt graduated in philosophy with a Film Art Management major at the Sapienza University of Rome.

While still in high school, Steigerwalt made her film debut playing the main female role in Gabriele Muccino's But Forever in My Mind, and later appeared in Muccino's The Last Kiss. After making her English-speaking debut in Audrey Wells' comedy-drama Under the Tuscan Sun and appearing in some other films, notably Volfango De Biasi's teen comedies Come tu mi vuoi and Iago, starting from 2012 Steigerwalt focused on screenwriting, taking various courses and getting a certificate in Feature Film Writing from UCLA.

Steigerwalt made her screenwriting debut in 2013, with the Paz! sequel Fiabeschi torna a casa. In 2022, she made her directorial debut with September, which got her a David di Donatello for best new director and a Silver Ribbon in the same category.

=== Personal life ===
Steigerwalt is married to the director and producer Matteo Rovere.

== Selected filmography ==
As Actress

- But Forever in My Mind (1999)
- The Last Kiss (2001)
- Our Tropical Island (2001)
- Paz! (2002)
- Kiss Me First (2003)
- Under the Tuscan Sun (2003)
- Come tu mi vuoi (2007)
- The Eternal City (2008)
- We Can Do That (2008)
- Iago (2009)

As Screenwriter

- Moglie e marito (2017)
- An Almost Ordinary Summer (2019)
- The Champion (2019)
- Marilyn's Eyes (2021)

As Director and Screenwriter

- September (2022)
- Diva Futura (2024)
