= Lord of the Ants =

2022 Italian biographical drama film

- Directed by: Gianni Amelio
- Screenplay by: Gianni Amelio; Edoardo Petti; Federico Fava
- Starring: Luigi Lo Cascio; Elio Germano; Leonardo Maltese; Sara Serraiocco; Anna Caterina Antonacci
- Cinematography: Luan Amelio Ujkaj
- Edited by: Simona Paggi
- Release dates: September 6, 2022 (Venice); September 8, 2022 (Italy)
- Running time: 134 minutes
- Language: Italian

Lord of the Ants (Italian: Il signore delle formiche, literally "The Lord of the Ants") is a 2022 Italian biographical drama film co-written and directed by Gianni Amelio. The film was entered into the main competition at the 79th Venice International Film Festival.

== Plot ==
A chronicle of the 1964–1968 judicial affair involving homosexual writer Aldo Braibanti, an anti-fascist playwright who was accused of having mentally manipulated two lovers.

== Cast ==
- Luigi Lo Cascio as Aldo Braibanti
- Elio Germano as Ennio Scribani
- Leonardo Maltese as Ettore Tagliaferri
- Davide Vecchi as Riccardo Tagliaferri
- Sara Serraiocco as Graziella
- Anna Caterina Antonacci as Ettore's Mother
- Valerio Binasco as Prosecutor

== Reception ==
On Rotten Tomatoes, the film has an approval rating of 70% based on 10 reviews, and an average rating of 5.8/10.

== Historical inaccurancies ==
A number of critics cited several inaccurancies in the film. The film incorrectly reported the position of l'Unità, the official organ of the Italian Communist Party, which in fact openly took a position in favour of Braibanti and against the sentence, so much so that the day after the ruling it published an editorial by its director, the former partisan Maurizio Ferrara, in which the obscurantist climate in which the trial had taken place was denounced in no uncertain terms. Paolo Gambescia, the reporter from l'Unità who followed the case, was not only strongly supported by the direction of the newspaper but continued to work profitably for many years after the closure of the case.
