= Vittorio Moroni =

Italian director and screenwriter (born 1971)

- Born: 1971 (age 54–55); Sondrio, Italy
- Occupations: Film director, screenwriter

Vittorio Moroni (born 1971 in Sondrio) is an Italian director and screenwriter.

He has directed three feature films, Tu devi essere il lupo (You Must Be the Wolf) that was nominated for the David di Donatello for Best New Director and Silver Ribbon in 2006 shot in Sondrio and Lisbon, Le ferie di Licu (Licu’s Holidays) shot in Rome and Bangladesh, for which he was nominated for the 2007 Silver Ribbon for best documentary, and the 2009's Eva e Adamo (Eve and Adam).

As a screenwriter, he has twice won the Premio Solinas, with Il sentiero del gatto (The Path of the Cat) (1998) and Una rivoluzione (One Revolution) (2002). In 2009 he received a scholarship for the treatment Se chiudo gli occhi non sono più qui (If i close my eyes I am not here anymore) and he was two times finalist with L’intruso (The Intruder) (2002) and Senza guardare giù (Without Looking Down) (2010). In 2010, he wrote with Emanuele Crialese the screenplay Terraferma by Emanuele Crialese (Special Jury Award Venezia 2011 and Italian film candidated to Oscar Awards 2012) and he wrote with Alessandro Gassmann the screenplay for Alessandro Gassman’s film Roman e il suo cucciolo. In 2009 he won the award for drama SIAE-AGIS-ETI with the theater piece La terza vita (The Third Life), staged in Italian theaters from 2011. Among the short films made, Eccesso di zelo (Too Much Zeal) (1997) won awards at many festivals - including the Nanni Moretti’s Sacher Silver Award and Universal Studios Award, which allowed Moroni to make a masterclass at the studios of Universal Pictures in Hollywood.

== Filmography ==
Year	Original title	English title	Other notes
1995	Quasi una storia	Almost a Story	Short film
1997	Eccesso di zelo	Too Much Zeal	Short film
1998	La terra vista da Marte	The Earth Seen from Mars	Short film
1999	Disperanze, Lettera dall'India	Desperate Hopes. A letter from India	Short film
1999	L'incontro	The Meet	documentary
2000	Black Tiger	Black Tiger	Documentary
2002	Sulle tracce del gatto	On the Trail of the Cat	Documentary, co-directed with Andrea Caccia
2003	Prove di danza per una musica nuova	Experimental Dance for a New Music	Documentary
2004	Tu devi essere il lupo	You Must Be the Wolf	Feature film
2006	Le ferie di Licu	Licu’s Holidays	Narrative documentary
2009	Eva e Adamo	Eve and Adam	Narrative documentary
2013	Se chiudo gli occhi non sono più qui	If i close my eyes I am not here anymore	Feature film
2022	Denise	Denise	Documentary series (4 episodes 60')
2022	N'en parlons plus	Let's forget it	Narrative documentary
2023	L'invenzione della neve	The invention of snow	Feature film

== Screenwriter ==
Year	Original title	Other notes
2022	'L'immensita	Feature film
2013	'Se chiudo gli occhi non sono più qui	Feature film
2012	'Razzabastarda	Feature film
2011	'Terraferma	Feature film
2009	'Eva e Adamo	Documentary
2006	'Le ferie di Licu	Documentary
2004	'Tu devi essere il lupo	Feature film
1997	'Eccesso di zelo	

== Theater ==
Year	Original title
2009	'La terza vita
2011	'Il grande mago
2021	'Penso che un sogno così non ritorni mai più
