= Strangeness (film) =

2022 film

- Theatrical release poster
- Directed by: Roberto Andò
- Starring: Toni Servillo; Ficarra e Picone
- Cinematography: Maurizio Calvesi
- Music by: Michele Braga
- Release date: 20 October 2022 (RFF)
- Running time: 103 minutes
- Country: Italy
- Language: Italian

Strangeness (Italian: La stranezza) is a 2022 Italian comedy-drama film directed by Roberto Andò. The film won four David di Donatello awards, for best original screenplay, best producer, best production designer and best costumes. It was also awarded the Nastro d'Argento of the Year.

== Plot ==
In 1920, Luigi Pirandello (Toni Servillo) is invited to Sicily for the occasion of the 80th birthday of his mentor, famous novelist and playwright Giovanni Verga. He meets various strange personalities and a mix of melancholy and distant memories sets the ground for creating his masterpiece, Six Characters in Search of an Author.

== Cast ==
- Toni Servillo as Luigi Pirandello
- Salvatore Ficarra as Sebastiano "Bastiano" Vella
- Valentino Picone as Onofrio "Nofrio" Principato
- Giulia Andò as Santina Vella
- Rosario Lisma as Mimmo Casà
- Donatella Finocchiaro as Maria Antonietta
- Aurora Quattrocchi as Maria Stella, the nanny
- Galatea Ranzi as the mother
- Fausto Russo Alesi as the father
- Aldo Failla as Tano
- Giordana Faggiano as the stepdaughther
- Tuccio Musumeci as Calogero Interrante
- Luigi Lo Cascio as the capocomico
- Renato Carpentieri as Giovanni Verga
