= Sandro Veronesi (writer) =

Italian novelist, journalist, and essayist (born 1959)

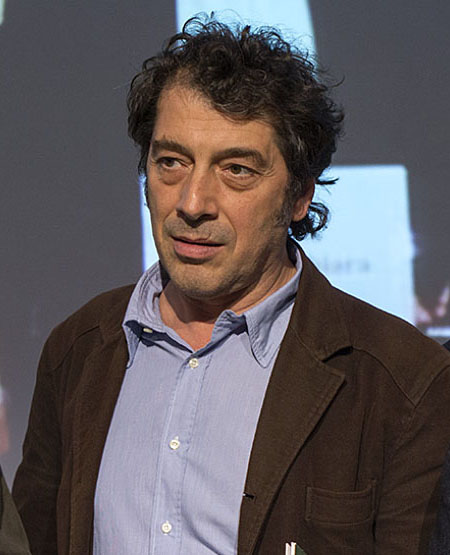
- Veronesi in 2012
- Born: 1959 (age 66–67); Florence, Italy
- Occupations: Novelist, writer
- Writing career
- Notable works: La forza del passato, Caos calmo (novel), The Hummingbird
- Notable awards: Strega Prize (2006, 2020)
- Website: www.sandroveronesi.it

Sandro Veronesi (born 1959) is an Italian novelist, essayist, and journalist. After earning a degree in architecture at the University of Florence, he opted for a writing career in his mid to late twenties. Veronesi published his first book at the age of 25, a collection of poetry (Il resto del cielo, 1984) that has remained his only venture into verse writing. He has since published five novels, three books of essays, one theatrical piece, numerous introductions to novels and collections of essays, interviews, screenplays, and television programs.

Veronesi has twice been awarded Italy's most prestigious literary prize, the Premio Strega: in 2006 for his novel Caos calmo and in 2020 for his novel The Hummingbird (Il colibrì).

== Works ==
Il resto del cielo consists of twenty-five short compositions, none longer than fourteen verses, that speak to the general problematics of communication, all of which are underscored by a constant coincidentia oppositorum. Seemingly simple verses, they speak eloquently to the narrating voice's quotidian landscape.

His first novel, Per dove parte questo treno allegro (1988), is the story of a typical relationship of the 1980s between father and son. A troubled rapport between them, the father is an adventurous businessman who, while deep in debt, has squirrelled away a few hundred thousand dollars in Switzerland. The son, an insipid thirty-year-old, who acts half his age, is a do-nothing with strange habits. While the two spend a few strained weeks together, their lives eventually begin to find some similarities.

With his second novel, Gli sfiorati (1990), Veronesi approaches the family thematics in a much more dramatic fashion. A family recomposed of two previously split ones, here too the father and son experience a troubled relationship. Mete, however, finds comfort in developing rapport with his beautiful stepsister. All this takes place in Rome, intertwined with other narratives of various social types that one might expect to find in such a chaotic metropolis that Veronesi depicts. Experimental, in some ways, this novel verges on the fantastic, while the author offers up a portrait of the early 1990s and its polymorphous, youthful generation, represented herein by the literal, and metaphorical, sign of "schiumevolezza."

Faithful to the theme of troubled relationships between two people of different generations, Venite venite B-52 (1995) changes the dynamics to that of father-daughter. As he did in his previous novels, especially in Gli sfiorati, here too Veronesi offers up a gallery of extraordinary characters, beginning with the father, Ennio Miraglia, a representation of the 1980s consumerist Italy, and his daughter Viola, whose desire to free herself of her father's Italy is underscored in the novel's title, her hopes that the American bombers come and destroy that which she abhors.

La forza del passato (2000; Premio Viareggio L. Repaci and the Premio Campiello) continues the father-son relationship. This time, however, the father is absent (dead), and – again different from before – we move from a positive memory of the dead father to one that questions his son's knowledge of who he truly was. Gianni Orzan is a writer of children's books whose life is suddenly shattered when he realizes that what he always believed about his father, and by extension of himself, may have all been a façade. Through Gianni's eventual stream-of-consciousness, both he and the novel's reader constantly shift between the present and, through the character's memory, the past.

Ring City (2001) is a children's novel. Topolino (Mickey Mouse) must confront the Fosterman clan, who has taken over the once tranquil city of Vocalia, transforming it into a giant boxing ring.

Caos calmo (novel) (2005) won him Italy's most prestigious award, the Strega Prize. Having lost his wife to a natural death, Pietro Paladini is able to recover his existential bearings only after re-examining life from its metaphorical underbelly, in his subsequent dealings with the people in his life, especially when he unorthodoxly hangs around in front of his daughter's school.

An assiduous essayist, much of the material in his non-fiction collections appeared in various daily and weekly newspapers and magazines, and serials, which include: Il manifesto, Epoca, Il Gambero Rosso, La Gazzetta del Prato, l'Unità, Nuovi Argomenti, Panta, Corriere della Sera. These books to date include: Cronache italiane (1992) and Live. Ritratti, sopralluoghi e collaudi (Bompiani, 1996), each of which originate chiefly from his journalistic writings. Occhio per occhio. La pena di morte in quattro storie (1992), instead, is an integral study of the death penalty and how it is administered in four different localities around the world: Sudan, Taiwan, the Soviet Union, and California. In 2002, Bompiani brought out his previous two collections, together with his "Nuove cronache" (1996–2002), in Superalbo. Le storie complete.

Veronesi is also a co-founder of the publishing house Fandango Libri along with Domenico Procacci, and of the web radio Radiogas.

In 2010, Italian newsmagazine La Repubblica reported that Fandango's artistic director, as part of the promotional campaign of new Veronesi's book, titled "XY", had announced to having inserted some fictional articles in italian language Wikipedia to attract new potential buyers. Shortly after he publicly apologized, claiming also to have included just one article in it.wiki.

== Bibliography ==
=== Fiction ===
- Il resto e il cielo. Prato: Edizioni del Palazzo, 1984.
- Per dove parte questo treno allegro. Rome: Theoria, 1988
- Gli sfiorati. Milan: Mondadori, 1990.
- Venite venite B-52. Milan: Feltrinelli, 1995.
- La forza del passato. Milan: Bompiani, 2000.
- Ring City. Milan: Disney, 2001.
- No Man's Land. Milan: Bompiani: 2003.
- Caos calmo (novel). Milan: Bompiani, 2005; English translation: Quiet Chaos, 2005.
- Brucia Troia. Milan: Bompiani, 2007.
- XY. Rome: Fandango Libri, 2010.
- Profezia (short story). RCS Quotidiani, 2011.
- Baci scagliati altrove (racconti). Rome: Fandango Libri, 2011.
- Terre rare. Milan: Bompiani, 2014.
- Non dirlo. Il Vangelo di Marco. Milan: Bompiani, 2015.
- Il colibrì. Milan: La Nave di Teseo, 2019
- Settembre nero. Milan: La Nave di Teseo, 2024
- Caducità. Tutti i racconti. Milan: La Nave di Teseo, 2026

=== Non-fiction ===
- Cronache italiane. Milan: Mondadori, 1991.
- Occhio per occhio. La pena di morte in quattro storie. Milan: Mondadori, 1992.
- Live. Ritratti, sopralluoghi e collaudi. Milan: Bompiani, 1996.
- Superalbo. Le storie complete. Milan: Bompiani, 2002.
- Viaggi e Viaggetti. Finché il tuo cuore non è contento. Milan: Bompiani Overlook, 2013
- Un dio ti guarda. Milan: La Nave di Teseo, 2016
- Cani d'estate. Milan: La Nave di Teseo, 2018

=== Introductions, essays, and interviews ===
- “Il trattino, uno e trino,” interview with Francesca Serafini in Punteggiatura. Alessandro Baricco, Filippo Taricco, Giorgio Vasta, Dario Voltolini, eds. BUR: Scuola Holden, 2001, p 145-54.
- “John Fante: la giovinezza come destino” in John Fante. Un anno terribile. Rome: Fazi, 2001, p 7-16.
- “Cento piccoli Totti,” Nuovi argomenti (January–March 2000) 5th series: 84–93.
- “Interview” with Cristiana Lardo, in L’ultima letteratura italiana: scrittori a Tor Vergata: interventi ed interviste. Cristiana Lardo and Fabio Pierangeli, eds. Rome: Vecchiarelli, 1999, p 135-41.
- “Tra gli Smith e san Paolo (epigrafi)” in Improvviso il novecento: Pasolini professore. Giordano Meacci, ed. Rome: Minimum Fax, 1999, p 189-226. (interview/essay)
- “Tirchieria del racconto e generosità del romanzo,” in Seminario sul racconto. Luigi Rustichelli, ed. Boca Raton: Bordighera Press, 1998, p 48-59.
- “Interview”, with Laura Lepri, in Panta: special issue, “Scrittura creativa. La scrittura creativa raccontata dagli scrittori che la insegnano,” Laura Lepri, ed. Milano: Bompiani, 1997, p 45-55.
- “Ma smettetela di chiamarci giovani scrittori,” L’Unità, 8 aprile 1995: 21.

=== Translations ===
- Alastair McEwen: The Force of the Past. New York: Ecco, 2003.
