= Emanuele Crialese =

Italian screenwriter and film director (born 1965)

Emanuele Crialese (Italian: [emanuˈɛːle kriaˈleːse]; born 27 May 1965) is an Italian screenwriter and film director. He is a native of Rome and studied filmmaking in New York City.

== Early life ==
Emanuele Crialese was born on 26 July 1965 in Rome to Sicilian parents. He studied filmmaking at the Tisch School of the Arts, New York University, from where he graduated in 1995. During this time he made several short films including Heartless (1994). His first feature film, Once We Were Strangers (1997), was an Italian-American co-production, funded by a producer who had noticed Crialese during his apprenticeship in the United States.

== Career ==
Between 1998 and 2000, Crialese worked in theater and on a drafting of a cinematic treatment of Ellis Island along with producer Robert Chartoff, the producer of Raging Bull and Rocky.

This was followed by the feature Respiro (2002) starring Valeria Golino. The film recounts an old Sicilian legend about the island of Lampedusa. Crialese won the Critics Week Grand Prize and the Young Critics Award at the Cannes Film Festival for the film. The film was nominated for the Best European Union Film at the César Awards and Best Film, David di Donatello Awards.

Nuovomondo (2006) premiered at the Venice Film Festival on 8 September 2006 to critical praise and seven nominations at the festival. The film won six awards at the Venice Film Festival, including two awards for Best Film (the CinemAvvenire and Pasinetti Awards), along with the FEDIC, SIGNIS, Silver Lion, and UNICEF awards. It was nominated for eleven David di Donatello Awards of which it won three. It was also nominated for a Golden Lion award and the European Film Award, for the Film of the Year. The film was Italy's submission for the 79th Academy Awards.

His fourth feature, Terraferma (2011), premiered at the 68th Venice International Film Festival. The film was selected as the Italian entry for the Best Foreign Language Film at the 84th Academy Awards, but it did not make the final shortlist. It won the Special Jury Prize at the Venice Film Festival the equivalent of third place. In 2012 he won the Mario Monicelli for Best Director at the Bari International Film Festival (BIF&St), Bari for the film. In 2022, he came out as a trans man while presenting his film L'immensità at the 2022 Venice Film Festival, about the relationship between a trans boy and his mother in the 1970s. Crialese said the film was inspired by his own experiences.

== Filmography ==
- Once We Were Strangers (1997)
- Respiro (2002)
- Nuovomondo (2006)
- Terraferma (2011)
- L'immensità (2022)
