= 69th David di Donatello =

2024 Italian film award ceremony

- Date: 3 May 2024
- Site: Cinecittà, Rome, Italy
- Hosted by: Carlo Conti; Alessia Marcuzzi

Highlights
- Best Picture: Io capitano
- Most awards: Io capitano (7)
- Most nominations: There's Still Tomorrow (19)

Television coverage
- Network: Rai 1

The 69th David di Donatello ceremony, presented by the Accademia del Cinema Italiano, was held on 3 May 2024 at Cinecittà Studios in Rome, to honour the best Italian films of 2023. It was hosted by Rai presenters Carlo Conti and Alessia Marcuzzi.

== Winners and nominees ==
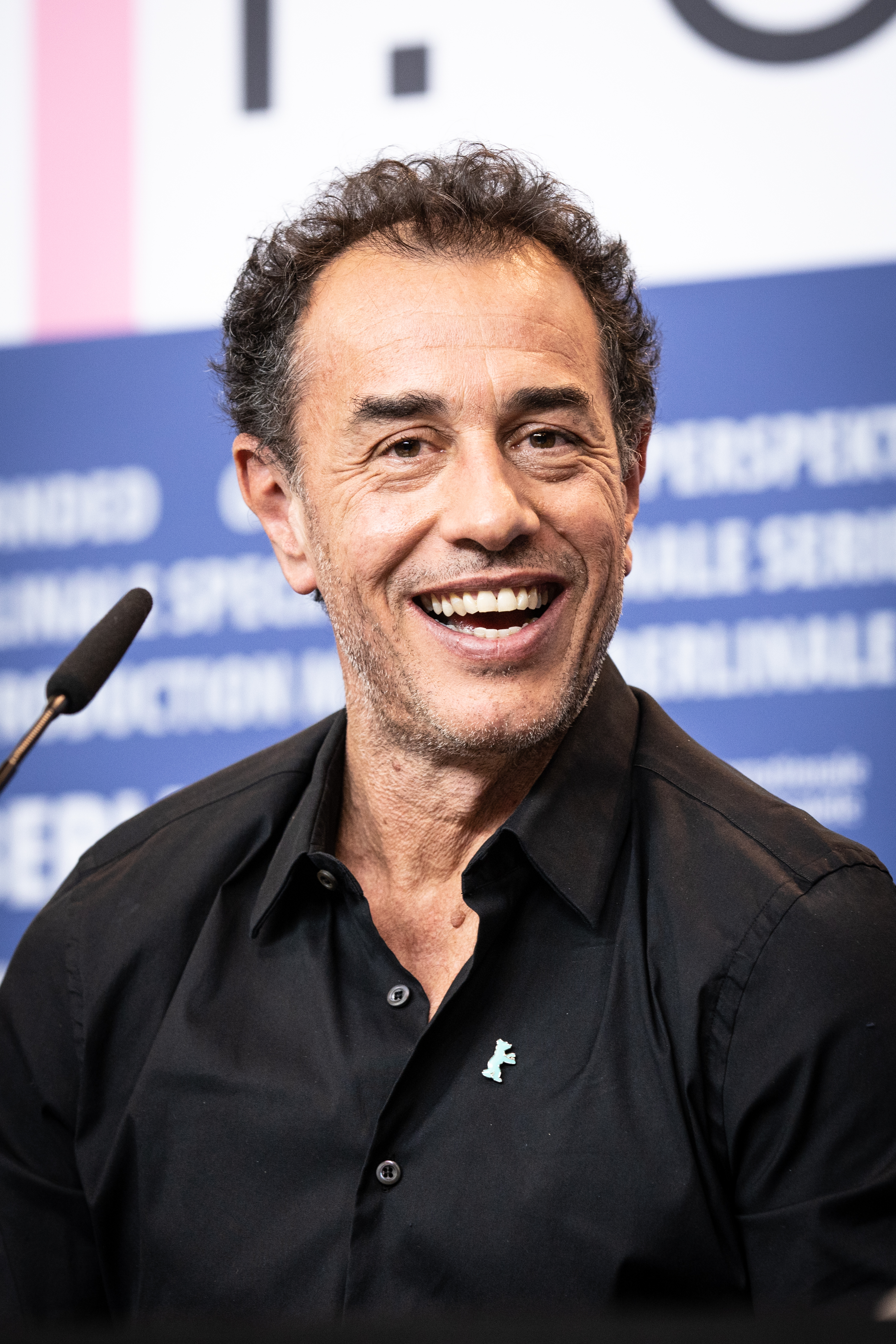
Matteo Garrone, Best Director winner

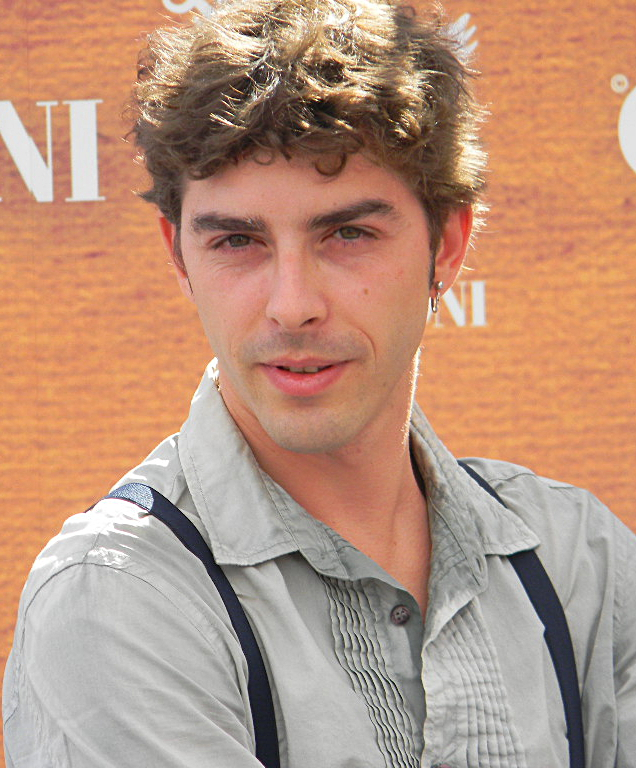
Michele Riondino, Best Actor winner

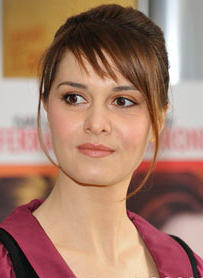
Paola Cortellesi, Best Actress winner

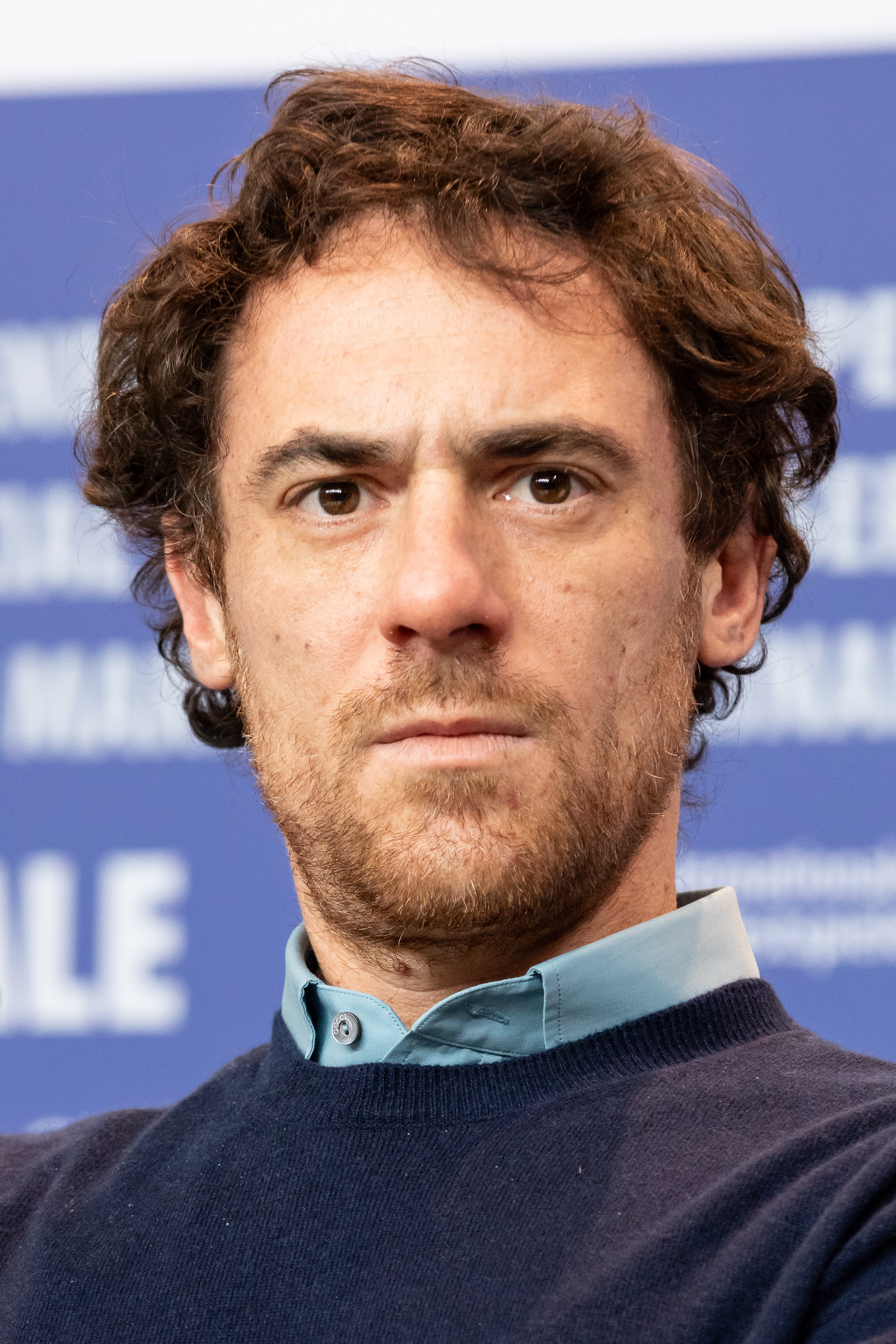
Elio Germano, Best Supporting Actor winner

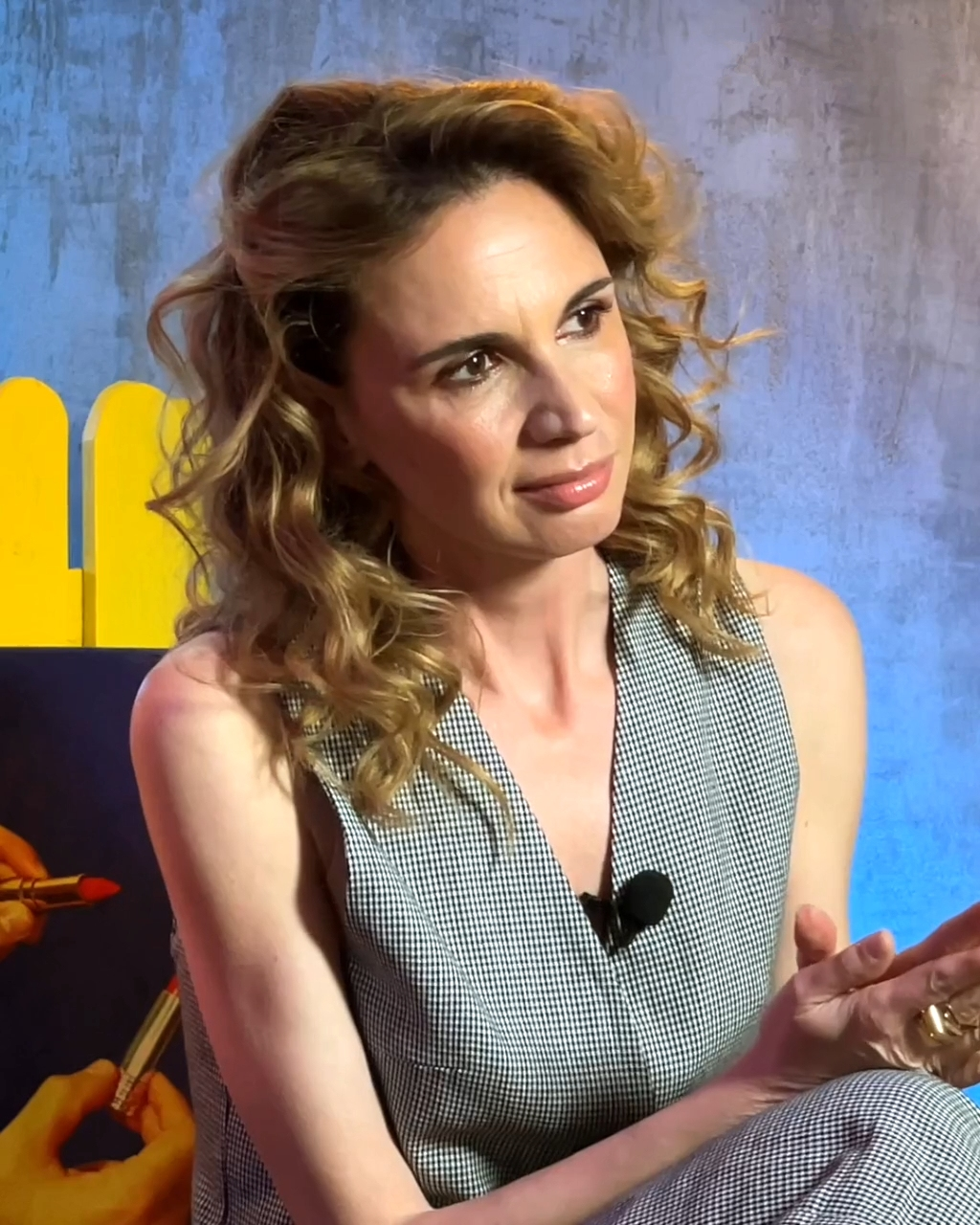
Emanuela Fanelli, Best Supporting Actress winner

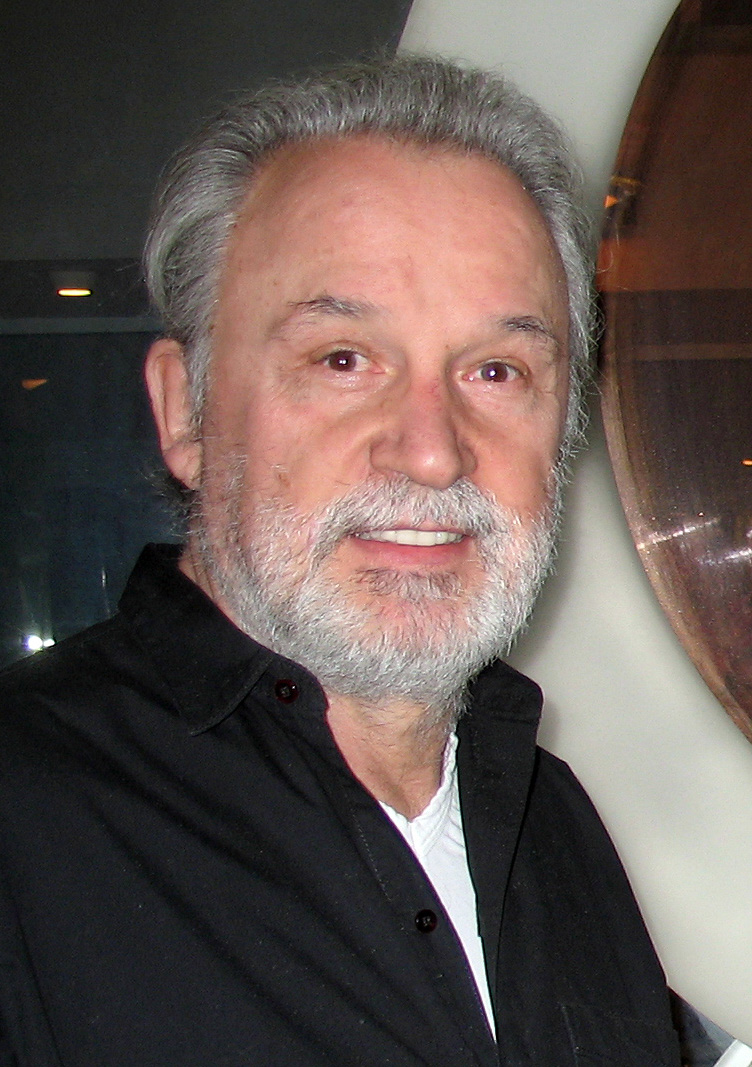
Giorgio Moroder, Career David winner

The nominations were announced on 3 April 2024. There's Still Tomorrow received the most nominations with nineteen, followed by Io capitano and La chimera with fifteen and thirteen, respectively. Io capitano went on to win seven awards, more than any other film in the ceremony, including Best Film.

Winners are listed first, highlighted in boldface, and indicated with a double dagger (‡)

**Best Film**: **Io capitano – directed by Matteo Garrone**; A Brighter Tomorrow – directed by Nanni Moretti; La chimera – directed by Alice Rohrwacher; Kidnapped – directed by Marco Bellocchio; There's Still Tomorrow – directed by Paola Cortellesi	**Best Producer**: **Io capitano – Archimede, Rai Cinema, Pathé, and Tarantula, production companies**; La chimera – Carlo Cresto-Dina and Paolo Del Brocco, producers; Rai Cinema, AMKA Films Productions, and Ad Vitam Production, production companies; Comandante – Nicola Giuliano, Francesca Cima, Carlotta Calori, Viola Prestieri, Pierpaolo Verga, Edoardo De Angelis, Paolo Del Brocco, Attilio De Razza, Mariagiovanna De Angelis, and Antonio Miyakawa, producers; Indigo Film, O'Groove, Rai Cinema, Tramp LTD, V-Groove, and Wise Pictures, production companies; Disco Boy – Giulia Achilli, Marco Alessi, Lionel Massol, Pauline Seigland, and André Logie, producers; Dugong Films, Films Grand Huit, Panache Productions, production companies; There's Still Tomorrow – Mario Gianani and Lorenzo Gangarossa, producers; Wildside, Vision Distribution, Sky, and Netflix, production companies
**Best Director**: **Matteo Garrone – Io capitano**; Marco Bellocchio – Kidnapped; Andrea Di Stefano – Last Night of Amore; Nanni Moretti – A Brighter Tomorrow; Alice Rohrwacher – La chimera	**Best Directorial Debut**: **Paola Cortellesi – There's Still Tomorrow**; Giacomo Abbruzzese – Disco Boy; Giuseppe Fiorello – Fireworks; Micaela Ramazzotti – Felicità; Michele Riondino – Palazzina Laf
**Best Actor**: **Michele Riondino – Palazzina Laf as Caterino Lamanna**; Antonio Albanese – A Hundred Sundays as Antonio Riva; Pierfrancesco Favino – Comandante as Salvatore Todaro; Valerio Mastandrea – There's Still Tomorrow as Ivano; Josh O'Connor – La chimera as Arthur	**Best Actress**: **Paola Cortellesi – There's Still Tomorrow as Delia**; Linda Caridi – Last Night of Amore as Viviana; Isabella Ragonese – Like Sheep Among Wolves as Stefania/Vera; Micaela Ramazzotti – Felicità as Desiré Mazzoni; Barbara Ronchi – Kidnapped as Marianna Mortara
**Best Supporting Actor**: **Elio Germano – Palazzina Laf as Giancarlo Basile**; Giorgio Colangeli – There's Still Tomorrow as Sor Ottorino; Adriano Giannini – Adagio as Vasco; Vinicio Marchioni – There's Still Tomorrow as Nino; Silvio Orlando – A Brighter Tomorrow as Ennio	**Best Supporting Actress**: **Emanuela Fanelli – There's Still Tomorrow as Marisa**; Barbora Bobuľová – A Brighter Tomorrow as Vera; Romana Maggiora Vergano – There's Still Tomorrow as Marcella; Alba Rohrwacher – La chimera as Frida; Isabella Rossellini – La chimera as Flora
**Best Original Screenplay**: **There's Still Tomorrow – Furio Andreotti, Giulia Calenda, and Paola Cortellesi**; La chimera – Alice Rohrwacher; A Brighter Tomorrow – Francesca Marciano, Nanni Moretti, Federica Pontremoli, and Valia Santella; Io capitano – Matteo Garrone, Massimo Gaudioso, Massimo Ceccherini, and Andrea Tagliaferri; Palazzina Laf – Maurizio Braucci and Michele Riondino	**Best Adapted Screenplay**: **Kidnapped – Marco Bellocchio and Susanna Nicchiarelli; based on the book Il caso Mortara by Daniele Scalise**; Lubo – Giorgio Diritti and Fredo Valla; based on the novel Il seminatore by Mario Cavatore; Misericordia – Emma Dante, Elena Stancanelli, and Giorgio Vasta; based on the play by Emma Dante; Mixed by Erry – Armando Festa and Sydney Sibilia; based on the book by Simona Frasca; Scarlet – Pietro Marcello, Maurizio Braucci, and Maud Ameline; based on the novel Scarlet Sails by Alexander Grin
**Best Cinematography**: **Io capitano – Paolo Carnera**; La chimera – Hélène Louvart; Comandante – Ferran Paredes Rubio; Kidnapped – Francesco Di Giacomo; There's Still Tomorrow – Davide Leone	**Best Production Design**: **Kidnapped – Production Design: Andrea Castorina; Set Decoration: Valeria Vecellio**; Io capitano – Production Design: Dimitri Capuani; Set Decoration: Roberta Troncarelli; La chimera – Production Design: Emita Frigato; Set Decoration: Rachele Meliadò; Comandante – Production Design: Carmine Guarino; Set Decoration: Iole Autero; There's Still Tomorrow – Production Design: Paola Comencini; Set Decoration: Fiorella Cicolini
**Best Score**: **Adagio – Subsonica**; A Brighter Tomorrow – Franco Piersanti; Io capitano – Andrea Farri; Last Night of Amore – Santi Pulvirenti; There's Still Tomorrow – Lele Marchitelli	**Best Original Song**: **"La mia terra" from Palazzina Laf – Music, lyrics, and performed by Diodato**; "Adagio" from Adagio – Music and lyrics by Samuel Umberto Romano, Massimiliano Casacci, Davide Dileo, Enrico Matta, and Luca Vicini; performed by Subsonica; "Baby" from Io capitano – Music by Andrea Farri; Lyrics and performed by Seydou Sarr; "'O DJ (Don't Give Up)" from Mixed by Erry – Music, lyrics, and performed by Liberato; "La vita com'è" from The Best Century of My Life – Music, lyrics, and performed by Brunori Sas
**Best Editing**: **Io capitano – Marco Spoletini**; La chimera – Nelly Quettier; Kidnapped – Francesca Calvelli and Stefano Mariotti; Last Night of Amore – Giogiò Franchini; There's Still Tomorrow – Valentina Mariani	**Best Sound**: **Io capitano – Maricetta Lombardo, Daniela Bassani, Mirko Perri, and Gianni Pallotto**; A Brighter Tomorrow – Alessandro Zanon, Marta Billingsley, Daniele Quadroli, and Paolo Segat; La chimera – Xavier Lavorel, Marta Billingsley, and Maxence Ciekawy; Comandante – Valentino Giannì, Alessandro Feletti, Mirko Perri, and Giancarlo Rutigliano; There's Still Tomorrow – Filippo Porcari, Alessandro Feletti, Luca Anzellotti, and Paolo Segat
**Best Costumes**: **Kidnapped – Sergio Ballo and Daria Calvelli**; La chimera – Loredana Buscemi; Comandante – Massimo Cantini Parrini; Io capitano – Stefano Ciammitti; There's Still Tomorrow – Alberto Moretti	**Best Visual Effects**: **Io capitano – Laurent Creusot and Massimo Cipollina**; Adagio – Stefano Leoni and Flaminia Maltese; Comandante – Kevin Tod Haug and Stacey Dodge; My Summer with the Shark – Fabio Tomassetti and Daniele Tomassetti; Kidnapped – Rodolfo Migliari and Lena Di Gennaro
**Best Make-up**: **Kidnapped – Enrico Iacoponi**; Adagio – Antonello Resch, Lorenzo Tamburini, Michele Salgaro Vaccaro, and Francesca Galafassi; There's Still Tomorrow – Ermanno Spera; Comandante – Paola Gattabrusi and Lorenzo Tamburini; Io capitano – Dalia Colli, Roberta Martorina	**Best Hairstyling**: **Kidnapped – Alberta Giuliani**; La chimera – Daniela Tartari; Comandante – Massimo Gattabrusi; Io capitano – Stefano Ciammitti and Dalia Colli; There's Still Tomorrow – Teresa Di Serio
**Best Documentary**: **Massimo Troisi: Somebody Down There Likes Me – directed by Mario Martone**; Enzo Jannacci: Vengo anch'io – directed by Giorgio Verdelli; Io, noi e Gaber – directed by Riccardo Milani; Roma, santa e dannata – directed by Roberto D'Agostino, Marco Giusti, and Daniele Ciprì; Walls – directed by Kasia Smutniak	**Best Short Film**: **The Meatseller – directed by Margherita Giusti**; As for Us – directed by Simone Massi; Asterión – directed by Francesco Montagner; Group Photo – directed by Tommaso Frangini; We Should All Be Futurists – directed by Angela Norelli
**Best International Film**: **Anatomy of a Fall (France) – directed by Justine Triet**; The Beasts (Spain / France) – directed by Rodrigo Sorogoyen; Fallen Leaves (Finland / Germany) – directed by Aki Kaurismäki; Killers of the Flower Moon (United States) – directed by Martin Scorsese; Oppenheimer (United States / United Kingdom) – directed by Christopher Nolan	**David Youth Award**: **There's Still Tomorrow – directed by Paola Cortellesi**; Comandante – directed by Edoardo De Angelis; Fireworks – directed by Giuseppe Fiorello; Io capitano – directed by Matteo Garrone; L'ultima volta che siamo stati bambini – directed by Claudio Bisio
**Special David Awards**: **Milena Vukotic**, Career David; **Giorgio Moroder**, Career David; **Vincenzo Mollica**, Special David	**David Audience Award**: **There's Still Tomorrow, directed by Paola Cortellesi for garnering 5,534,653 spectators**

== Films with multiple nominations and awards ==
Films that received multiple nominations
Nominations	Film
19	There's Still Tomorrow
15	Io capitano
13	La chimera
11	Kidnapped
10	Comandante
7	A Brighter Tomorrow
5	Adagio
5	Palazzina Laf
4	Last Night of Amore
2	Disco Boy
2	Felicità
2	Fireworks
2	Mixed by Erry

Films that received multiple awards
Awards	Film
7	Io capitano
6	There's Still Tomorrow
5	Kidnapped
3	Palazzina Laf
