= David di Donatello for Best Original Screenplay =

Italian film award

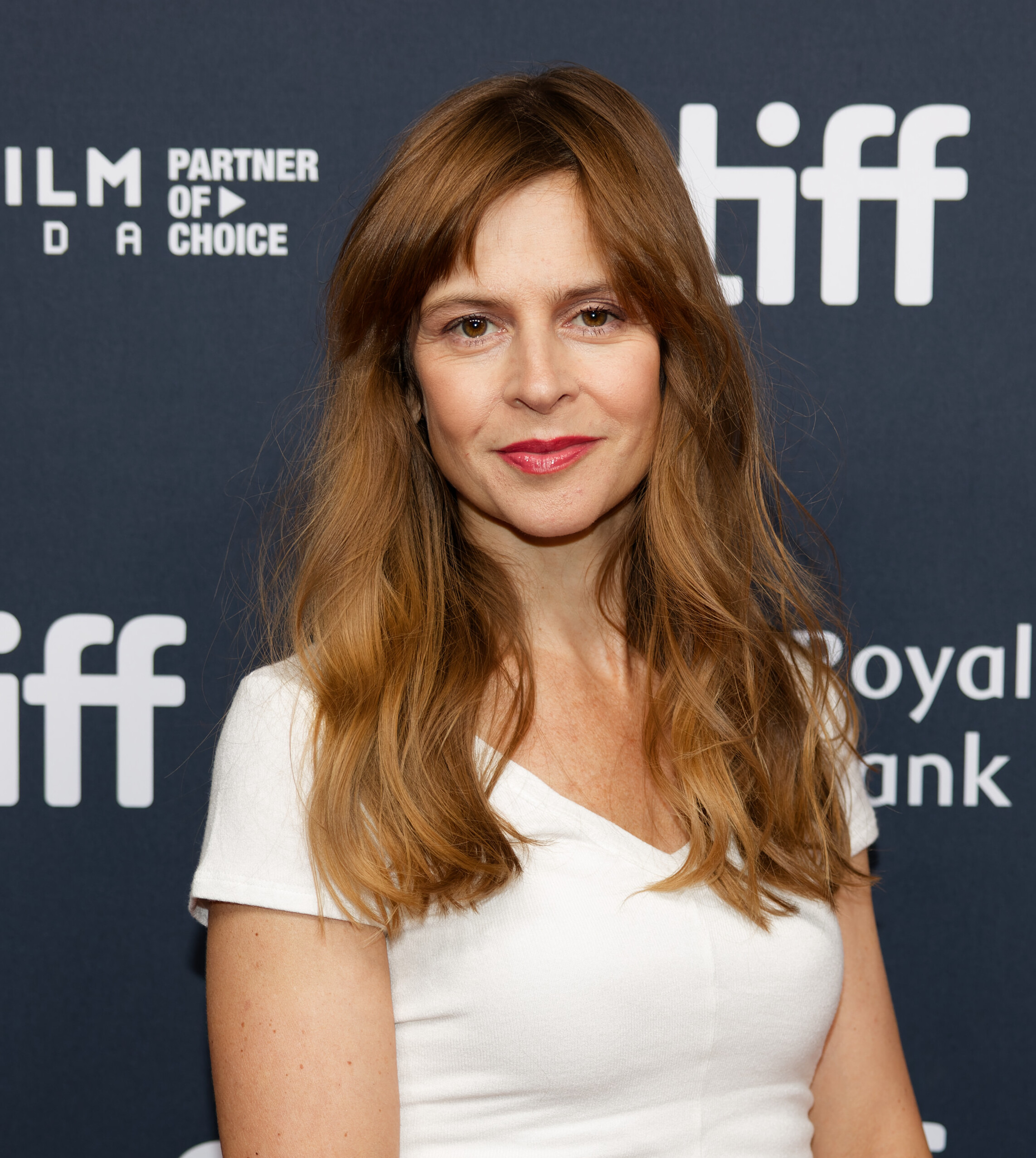
- The 2025 recipient: Maura Delpero
- Country: Italy
- Presented by: Accademia del Cinema Italiano
- First award: 2017
- Currently held by: Maura Delpero; Vermiglio (2025)
- Website: www.daviddidonatello.it

The David di Donatello for Best Original Screenplay (Italian: David di Donatello per la migliore sceneggiatura originale) is an award presented annually by the Accademia del Cinema Italiano since 2017. Together with the David di Donatello for Best Adapted Screenplay, it replaced the integrated David di Donatello for Best Screenplay (1975–2016).

== Winners and nominees ==
=== 2010s ===
Year	English title	Original title	Screenwriter(s)
2017	Indivisible	Indivisibili	Nicola Guaglianone, Barbara Petronio and Edoardo De Angelis
2017	At War with Love	In guerra per amore	Michele Astori, Pierfrancesco Diliberto and Marco Martani
2017	The Confessions	Le confessioni	Roberto Andò and Angelo Pasquini
2017	Fiore		Claudio Giovannesi, Filippo Gravino and Antonella Lattanzi
2017	Italian Race	Veloce come il vento	Filippo Gravino, Francesca Manieri and Matteo Rovere
2017	Like Crazy	La pazza gioia	Paolo Virzì and Francesca Archibugi
2018	Nico, 1988		Susanna Nicchiarelli
2018	A Ciambra		Jonas Carpignano
2018	Friends by Chance	Tutto quello che vuoi	Francesco Bruni
2018	The Girl in the Fog	La ragazza nella nebbia	Donato Carrisi
2018	Love and Bullets	Ammore e malavita	Manetti Bros. and Michelangelo La Neve
2019	Dogman		Ugo Chiti, Massimo Gaudioso and Matteo Garrone
2019	Boys Cry	La terra dell'abbastanza	Damiano and Fabio D'Innocenzo
2019	Euphoria	Euforia	Francesca Marciano, Valia Santella and Valeria Golino
2019	Happy as Lazzaro	Lazzaro felice	Alice Rohrwacher
2019	On My Skin	Sulla mia pelle	Alessio Cremonini and Lisa Nur Sultan

=== 2020s ===
Year	English title	Original title	Screenwriter(s)
2020	The Traitor	Il traditore	Marco Bellocchio, Ludovica Rampoldi, Valia Santella and Francesco Piccolo
2020	Bangla		Phaim Bhuiyan and Vanessa Picciarelli
2020	The First King: Birth of an Empire	Il primo re	Filippo Gravino, Francesca Manieri and Matteo Rovere
2020	The Goddess of Fortune	La dea fortuna	Gianni Romoli, Silvia Ranfagni and Ferzan Özpetek
2020	Ricordi?		Valerio Mieli
2021	Figli		Mattia Torre
2021	Bad Tales	Favolacce	Damiano and Fabio D'Innocenzo
2021	Everything's Gonna Be Alright	Cosa sarà	Francesco Bruni, with the participation of Kim Rossi Stuart
2021	Hidden Away	Volevo nascondermi	Giorgio Diritti and Tania Pedroni, with the collaboration of Fredo Valla
2021	The Predators	I predatori	Pietro Castellitto
2022	The Inner Cage	Ariaferma	Leonardo Di Costanzo, Bruno Oliviero and Valia Santella
2022	A Chiara		Jonas Carpignano
2022	Freaks Out		Nicola Guaglianone and Gabriele Mainetti
2022	The Hand of God	È stata la mano di Dio	Paolo Sorrentino
2022	The King of Laughter	Qui rido io	Mario Martone and Ippolita Di Majo
2023	Strangeness	La stranezza	Roberto Andò, Ugo Chiti and Massimo Gaudioso
2023	Chiara		Susanna Nicchiarelli
2023	Exterior Night	Esterno notte	Marco Bellocchio, Stefano Bises, Ludovica Rampoldi and Davide Serino
2023	L'immensità		Emanuele Crialese, Francesca Manieri and Vittorio Moroni
2023	Lord of the Ants	Il signore delle formiche	Gianni Amelio, Edoardo Petti and Federico Fava
2023	Never Too Late for Love	Astolfo	Gianni Di Gregorio and Marco Pettenello
2024	There's Still Tomorrow	C'è ancora domani	Furio Andreotti, Giulia Calenda and Paola Cortellesi
2024	A Brighter Tomorrow	Il sol dell'avvenire	Francesca Marciano, Nanni Moretti, Federica Pontremoli and Valia Santella
2024	La chimera		Alice Rohrwacher, Marco Pettenello and Carmela Covino
2024	Io capitano		Matteo Garrone, Massimo Gaudioso, Massimo Ceccherini and Andrea Tagliaferri
2024	Palazzina Laf		Maurizio Braucci and Michele Riondino

== See also ==
- Academy Award for Best Original Screenplay
- BAFTA Award for Best Original Screenplay
- César Award for Best Original Screenplay
- Goya Award for Best Original Screenplay
