= Io capitano =

2023 film by Matteo Garrone

- Theatrical release poster
- Directed by: Matteo Garrone
- Written by: Matteo Garrone; Massimo Gaudioso; Massimo Ceccherini; Andrea Tagliaferri
- Produced by: Matteo Garrone; Paolo Del Brocco
- Starring: Seydou Sarr; Moustapha Fall
- Cinematography: Paolo Carnera
- Edited by: Marco Spoletini
- Music by: Andrea Farri
- Production companies: Archimede; Rai Cinema; Tarantula; Pathé; Logical Content Ventures; RTBF; VOO; BE TV; Proximus; Shelter Prod
- Distributed by: 01 Distribution (Italy); Pathé Distribution (France); Paradiso Films (Belgium)
- Release dates: 6 September 2023 (Venice); 7 September 2023 (Italy); 3 January 2024 (France); 10 January 2024 (Belgium)
- Running time: 121 minutes
- Countries: Italy; Belgium; France
- Languages: Wolof; French
- Budget: €11 million
- Box office: $7.6 million

Io capitano (lit. 'Me Captain' in Italian) is a 2023 drama film directed by Matteo Garrone, from a screenplay written by Garrone with Massimo Gaudioso, Massimo Ceccherini and Andrea Tagliaferri.

The film, an international co-production between Italy, Belgium and France, is based on an original idea by Garrone, inspired by actual stories of migrants' African routes to Europe. Filming took place in Senegal, Morocco and Italy.

Io capitano competed for the Golden Lion at the 80th Venice International Film Festival, where it won the Silver Lion for Matteo Garrone's direction and the Marcello Mastroianni Award for Seydou Sarr's performance. It was released theatrically in Italy by 01 Distribution on 7 September 2023, receiving critical acclaim, and winning seven awards at the 69th David di Donatello, including Best Film. The film also received nominations for Best Foreign Language Film at the 81st Golden Globe Awards and Best International Feature Film at the 96th Academy Awards.

== Plot ==
Seydou and Moussa, two teenage cousins living in Dakar, dream of escaping poverty and have made plans to leave their hometown for Italy, against the advice of local men and expressed wishes of Seydou's mother. After consulting a local shaman, the boys leave in the night and make their way to Mali, purchasing false passports from an English speaker at a rest stop. The forgery is discovered by a soldier at the border, who accepts a bribe in order to let them through.

Once in Niger, they pay to join a group crossing the Sahara desert into Libya; first by pickup truck and later on foot with a guide. Two people are left behind on the journey; the speeding truck drivers refuse to stop when a man falls off, and an exhausted woman is left to die in the desert despite Seydou's efforts. In the first of several dreamlike sequences, Seydou fantasises about taking the woman's hand as she floats through the Sahara. After entering Libya, rebels intercept the group and shake them down for valuables, taking away Moussa after he attempted to hide his money in his rectum. Forlorn, Seydou continues with the group. The trip is revealed to be a ruse; they are led directly into a smuggler-run prison and, under threat of torture and slavery, are extorted to contact their relatives for ransom money. Rather than reveal his situation to his family, Seydou allows himself to be subjected to torture and imprisoned. In another dream sequence, the Dakar shaman allows Seydou to visit his sleeping mother back home, guided by a flying spirit.

The next day, fellow French-speaking inmate Martin pulls Seydou along to a slave auction, where the representative of a wealthy estate purchases them as bricklayers. At the remote estate, Martin and Seydou are put to work building a new fence and a fountain, being treated relatively well despite their servitude. The two men bond on a personal level, with Martin and Seydou sharing stories of their families and hopes for their futures. Having completed their tasks, the estate's patriarch releases Martin and Seydou and pays for their transport to Tripoli. On arrival, the two sorrowfully separate as Martin chooses to continue his journey towards Caserta, near Naples, while Seydou remains in Tripoli to search the Senegalese enclaves for Moussa, taking up a construction job in the meantime. After some time, Seydou finally locates Moussa, who managed to escape from jail but was shot in the leg in the process. Moussa's leg is temporarily stabilized, but his urgent need for advanced medical care puts further pressure on them to resume the journey to Europe. Seydou turns to a fixer, Ahmed, who organizes the crossings in the Mediterranean Sea.

Without sufficient money, Seydou is offered only one option: he will have to pilot the boat himself. Ahmed instructs Seydou on how to steer the vessel and navigate with a compass northwards from Tripoli to Sicily. Despite a grueling journey with fights among the passengers and the birth of a baby onboard, Seydou manages to pilot the boat safely across. In sight of the Sicilian shore, the boat is intercepted by an Italian coast guard helicopter. Despite the jubilation of Seydou - who shouts "Io capitano!" (Italian: I (am) the captain) to the helicopter above - and the boat's passengers, they now face an uncertain future at the hands of the Italian government.

== Cast ==
- Seydou Sarr as Seydou
- Moustapha Fall as Moussa
- Issaka Sawagodo as Martin
- Hichem Yacoubi as Ahmed
- Doodou Sagna as Charlatan
- Khady Sy as Seydou's Mother
- Bamar Kane as Bouba
- Cheick Oumar Diaw as Sisko

== Production ==
Io capitano is based on an original idea by director Matteo Garrone, who wrote the screenplay with Massimo Gaudioso, Massimo Ceccherini and Andrea Tagliaferri. The script is based on the stories of emigration from Africa to Europe by Kouassi Pli Adama Mamadou, Arnaud Zohin, Amara Fofana, Brhane Tareke, and Siaka Doumbia.

The film was produced by Archimede, Rai Cinema, Tarantula, Pathé and Logical Content Ventures, in coproduction with RTBF, VOO-BE TV, Proximus and Shelter Prod, with the support of the Ministry of Culture, Film and Audiovisual Centre of the Wallonia-Brussels Federation, taxshelter.be, ING, and the tax shelter of the Belgian federal government, and the participation of Canal+, Ciné+ and Wallimage (Wallonia). The project had a budget of approximately €11.2 million.

The castings, under the direction of Henri-Didier Njikam, took place on the African continent, and features Seydou Sarr and Moustapha Fall, originally from Dakar, at ages 17 and 18, respectively. Principal photography began in Dakar, Senegal. The production, which lasted for 13 weeks, also took place in Morocco and Italy. The film was shot in sequence, beginning with two and a half weeks in Senegal and four weeks in the desert. The desert locations included the souk of Errachidia, the dunes of Merzouga and the pre-desert zones outside of Ouarzazate. Filming continued in Casablanca, which served as a stand-in for Tripoli and where the detention centres scenes were shot. Filming then moved to the sea with a fishing boat for three weeks. The final parts of the film were shot off the coast of Marsala, Sicily.

== Release ==
Io capitano was selected to compete for the Golden Lion at the 80th Venice International Film Festival, where it had its world premiere on 6 September 2023, and received a 13-minute standing ovation at the end of its screening. World sales are handled by Pathé International. The film was theatrically released in Italy on 7 September 2023 by 01 Distribution. Pathé distributed the film in France on 3 January 2024. Paradiso Films handled the theatrical release in Belgium on 10 January 2024. It was also released by Cohen Media Group in the United States on 23 February 2024. Altitude Films distributed the film in the United Kingdom on 5 April 2024.

A special screening of the film took place at the Vatican on 14 September 2023. Garrone and the cast of the film were in attendance, where they were granted an audience with Pope Francis at his Domus Sanctae Marthae residence.

== Reception ==
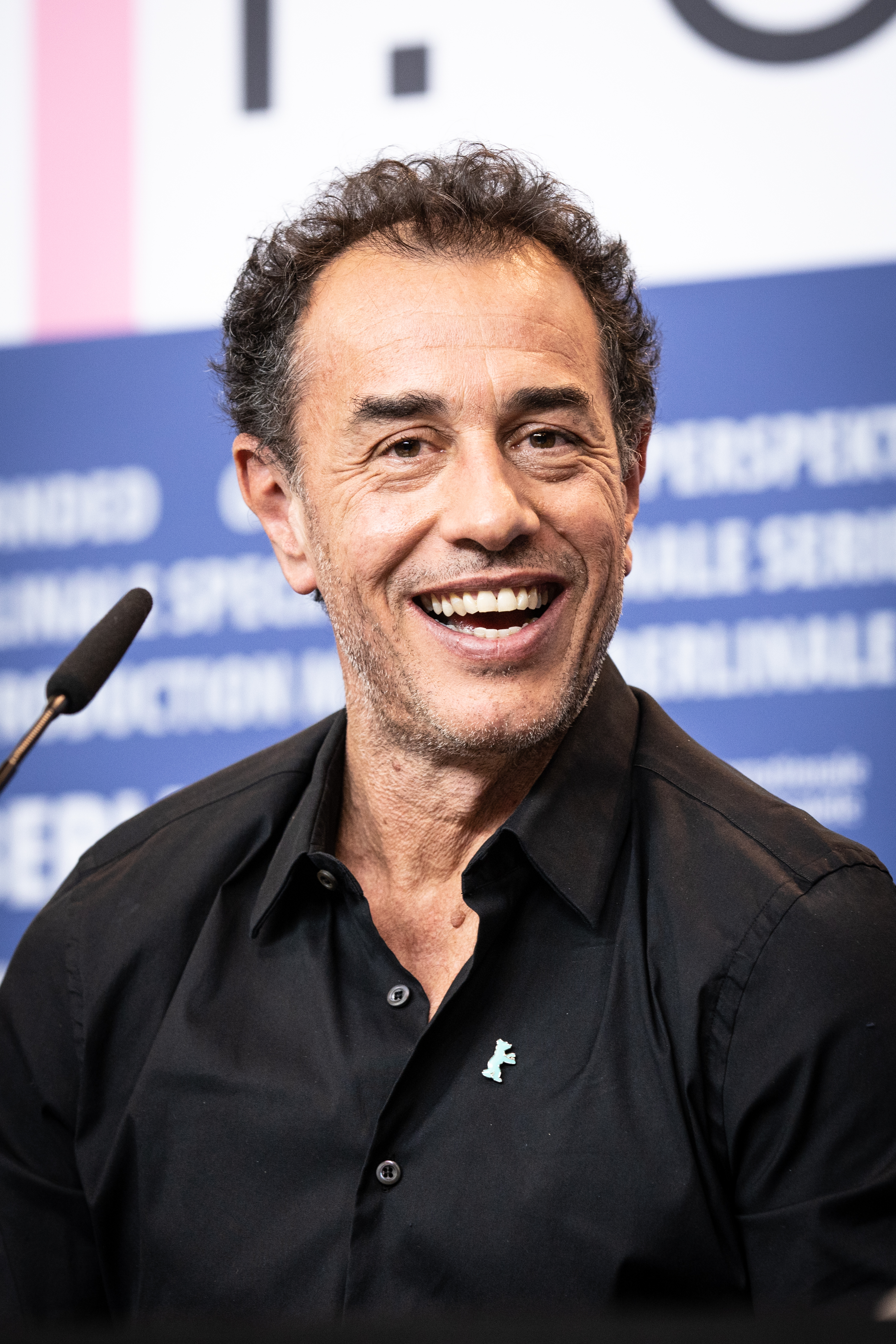
The direction of Matteo Garrone was critically acclaimed during the 80th Venice International Film Festival.

=== Critical response ===
On the review aggregator website Rotten Tomatoes, the film holds an approval rating of 96% based on 113 reviews. The website's consensus reads: "A journey toward hope, Io Capitano perambulates through the ravishing Saharan landscape encountering the most sublime and debased corners of humanity". Metacritic, which uses a weighted average, assigned the film a score of 79 out of 100, based on 25 critics, indicating "generally favorable".

Guy Lodge of Variety reflected on the theme of the film by reporting that, compared to other European film projects dealing with African emigration to Europe, it is seen "not as its setting but as a near-mythic objective". Lodge states that the director produced his "most robust, purely satisfying" work in Io capitano, and that although the film in some scenes presents "Western aesthetic and narrative instincts," it is "hard not to be caught up in the film's grand, honestly felt emotional sweep" supported by the skill of actor Seydou Sarr. Leslie Felperin, reviewing the film for The Hollywood Reporter, wrote that despite the presence of "dazzling" landscapes, the film "always keeps the focus on the humans," sensing a "porousness here between the everyday world and the spiritual dimension, a haziness that's often a feature in West African cinema," due to the fact that "Garrone keeps us guessing right up until the very last moment of the film". Deadline Hollywood journalist Damon Wise has described the cinematic technique adopted for the film as "flawless," writing that cinematographer Paolo Carnera was able to convey a "stunning, immersive immediacy". Wise also says that the film's "biggest achievement" was the cast of actors who are able to make the project "authentic at every step of its audacious journey".

For Italian film critic Mattia Pasquini of Ciak gave the film four stars out of five, writing that the most important factor is the "intellectual and design honesty" in which the director makes "the choice to limit his authorship." The journalist reported that although the film sidestepped some "dramatic possibilities" and presents a "mechanical" narrative in some scenes, the end result is constituted of "legitimate and uncritical choices that make the film ideologically unassailable." Davide Turrini of Il Fatto Quotidiano stated that in the film "the immediate structural reference is to the Odyssey" in which "the fragile and soft innocence of the two protagonists" are "prevented from being a community of solidarity." Paolo Mereghetti, reviewing the film for Corriere della Sera, wrote that the film is able to "always remain at protagonist height, identifying with their gaze, avoiding any preachy attitude" transfiguring "tragedy through the power of fantasy and fable."

=== Accolades ===
Award	Date of ceremony	Category	Recipient(s)	Result	Ref.
Academy Awards	10 March 2024	Best International Feature Film	Io capitano	Nominated	
David di Donatello	3 May 2024	Best Film	Io capitano	Won	
David di Donatello	3 May 2024	Best Producer	Archimede, Rai Cinema, Pathé, Tarantula	Won	
David di Donatello	3 May 2024	Best Director	Matteo Garrone	Won	
David di Donatello	3 May 2024	Best Original Screenplay	Matteo Garrone, Massimo Gaudioso, Massimo Ceccherini, Andrea Tagliaferri	Nominated	
David di Donatello	3 May 2024	Best Cinematography	Paolo Carnera	Won	
David di Donatello	3 May 2024	Best Score	Andrea Farri	Nominated	
David di Donatello	3 May 2024	Best Original Song	"Baby" – Music by Andrea Farri; Lyrics and Performed by Seydou Sarr	Nominated	
David di Donatello	3 May 2024	Best Production Design	Dimitri Capuani, Roberta Troncarelli	Nominated	
David di Donatello	3 May 2024	Best Editing	Marco Spoletini	Won	
David di Donatello	3 May 2024	Best Sound	Maricetta Lombardo, Daniela Bassani, Mirko Perri, Gianni Pallotto	Won	
David di Donatello	3 May 2024	Best Costumes	Stefano Ciammitti	Nominated	
David di Donatello	3 May 2024	Best Visual Effects	Laurent Creusot, Massimo Cipollina	Won	
David di Donatello	3 May 2024	Best Make-up	Dalia Colli, Roberta Martorina	Nominated	
David di Donatello	3 May 2024	Best Hairstyling	Stefano Ciammitti, Dalia Colli	Nominated	
David di Donatello	3 May 2024	David Youth Award	Io capitano	Nominated	
European Film Awards	9 December 2023	Best Film	Io capitano	Nominated	
European Film Awards	9 December 2023	Best Director	Matteo Garrone	Nominated	
Ghent International Film Festival	21 October 2023	Best Film	Io capitano	Nominated	
Golden Globe Awards	7 January 2024	Best Foreign Language Film	Io capitano	Nominated	
Magritte Awards	22 February 2025	Best Foreign Film	Io capitano	Nominated	
Nastro d'Argento	27 June 2024	Best Film	Io capitano	Won	
Nastro d'Argento	27 June 2024	Best Director	Matteo Garrone	Won	
Nastro d'Argento	27 June 2024	Best Screenplay	Matteo Garrone, Massimo Ceccherini, Massimo Gaudioso, Andrea Tagliaferri	Nominated	
Nastro d'Argento	27 June 2024	Best Cinematography	Paolo Carnera	Won	
Nastro d'Argento	27 June 2024	Best Production Design	Dimitri Capuani	Nominated	
Nastro d'Argento	27 June 2024	Best Editing	Marco Spoletini	Won	
Nastro d'Argento	27 June 2024	Best Sound	Maricetta Lombardo	Won	
Nastro d'Argento	27 June 2024	Best Casting Director	Francesco Vedovati	Won	
Nastro d'Argento	27 June 2024	Best Score	Andrea Farri	Nominated	
Palm Springs International Film Festival	15 January 2024	Best Foreign Language Film	Io capitano	Nominated	
San Sebastián International Film Festival	30 September 2023	City of Donostia / San Sebastian Audience Award for Best European Film	Io capitano	Won	
Satellite Awards	18 February 2024	Best Foreign Language Film	Io capitano	Nominated	
Venice Film Festival	9 September 2023	Golden Lion	Io capitano	Nominated	
Venice Film Festival	9 September 2023	CICT - UNESCO Enrico Fulchignoni Award	Io capitano	Won	
Venice Film Festival	9 September 2023	Civitas Award	Io capitano	Won	
Venice Film Festival	9 September 2023	Edipo Re Award	Io capitano	Won	
Venice Film Festival	9 September 2023	FEDIC Award	Io capitano	Won	
Venice Film Festival	9 September 2023	Francesco Pasinetti Award	Io capitano	Won	
Venice Film Festival	9 September 2023	ImpACT Award	Io capitano	Won	
Venice Film Festival	9 September 2023	Lanterna Magica Award	Io capitano	Won	
Venice Film Festival	9 September 2023	Leoncino d'Oro Award	Io capitano	Won	
Venice Film Festival	9 September 2023	Silver Lion for Best Director	Matteo Garrone	Won	
Venice Film Festival	9 September 2023	Marcello Mastroianni Award	Seydou Sarr	Won	
Venice Film Festival	9 September 2023	La Pellicola d'Oro Award - Best Production Director	Claudia Cravotta	Won	
Venice Film Festival	9 September 2023	Premio Soundtrack Stars Award - Best Soundtrack	Andrea Farri	Won	

== See also ==
- List of submissions to the 96th Academy Awards for Best International Feature Film
- List of Italian submissions for the Academy Award for Best International Feature Film
