= Vitaliano Trevisan =

Italian writer, playwright and actor (1969–2022)

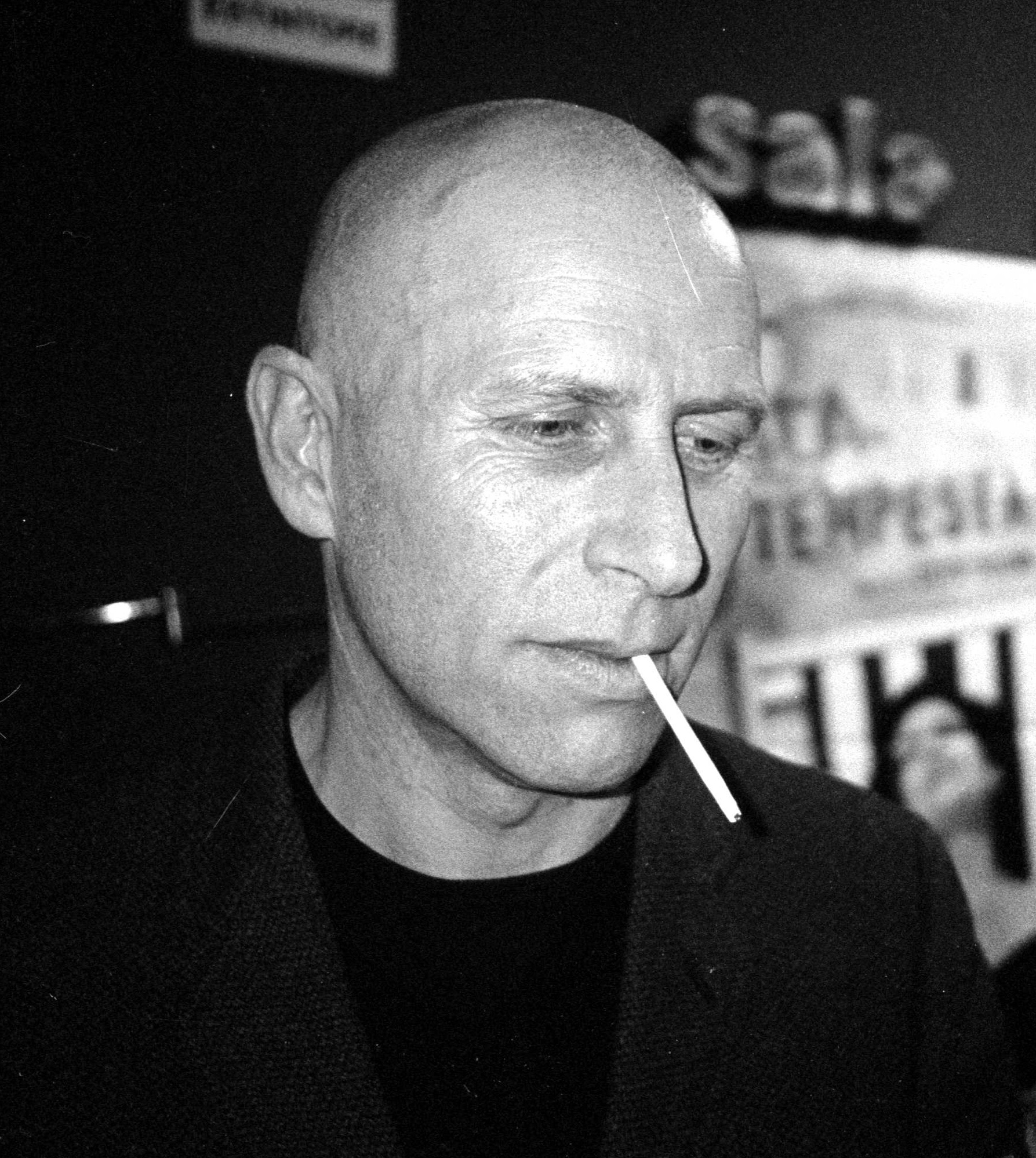
- Trevisan in 2004
- Born: 12 December 1960; Sandrigo, Province of Vicenza, Italy
- Died: 7 January 2022 (aged 61); Crespadoro, Province of Vicenza, Italy
- Occupations: writer, playwright and actor

Vitaliano Trevisan (12 December 1960 – 7 January 2022) was an Italian writer, playwright, and actor.

== Life and career ==
After having done different jobs, including surveyor, laborer and ice cream man, Trevisan debuted as a writer in the late 1990s and had breakthrough with the novel I quindicimila passi ("The fifteen thousand steps"), which won the Campiello Europa Award and the Premio Lo Straniero. In the following years he also had a busy career as a playwright, and among his major stage works there were Il lavoro rende liberi ("Work sets you free") staged by Toni Servillo and Giulietta, an adaptation of a short story of Federico Fellini. He was also active in television and cinema, notably collaborating with Matteo Garrone as a screenwriter and an actor in First Love.

=== Death ===
Trevisan died in Crespadoro on 7 January 2022, at the age of 61. His death, apparently caused by a medicine overdose, was ruled as a suicide. He left a suicide note, in which he wrote among other things "I am exhausted and I can't take it anymore", and "nobody must feel responsible as nobody could have done anything".

== Publications ==
- Un mondo meraviglioso (1997)
- Trio senza pianoforte (1998)
- I quindicimila passi. Un resoconto (2002)
- Standards vol.1° (2002)
- Un mondo meraviglioso. Uno standard (2003)
- Shorts (2004)
- Wordstar(s). Trilogia alla memoria (2004)
- Il lavoro rende liberi (2005)
- Oscillazioni (2006)
- Note sui sillabari (2007)
- 3 drammi brevi (2008)
- Il ponte. Un crollo (2008)
- Madre con cuscino (2009)
- Grotteschi e arabeschi (2009)
- Due monologhi (2009)
- Tristissimi giardini (2010)
- Una notte in Tunisia (2011)
- Works (2016)

== Selected filmography ==
- First Love (2004)
- Questioni di pelle (2006)
- Riparo (2006)
- R.I.S. Roma - Delitti imperfetti (TV-Series, 2009)
- Once Upon a Time the City of Fools (2010)
- Things from Another World (2011)
- Finché c'è prosecco c'è speranza (2017)
- Il grande passo (2019)
- Sole (2019)
