= Murder of Monica Calò =

1998 murder in Italy

- Location: Verbania, Italy
- Date: 14 July 1998 (CET)
- Attack type: Murder (stabbing)
- Victim: Monica Calo
- Perpetrator: Marco Mariolini
- Motive: paraphilic disorder

On 14 July 1998, Italian woman Monica Calò was stabbed to death by her stalker/abuser in Verbania, Italy. The case raised debates about femicide and anorexia.

== Events ==
Calò, a speech therapy student from Domodossola, was in a toxic and controlling relationship with Marco Mariolini, a 40-year-old antique dealer from Pisogne. The relationship was tormented from the beginning with coercive control being exhibited. Mariolini exercised a rigid control over Calò in all her choices, including food.

Following an argument, Mariolini stabbed Calò 22 times, killing her.

The trial of Mariolini ended on 30 March 2000 with an abbreviated procedure with a sentence of the Assize Court of Novara condemning him to 30 years in prison. In 2020, his request for release was rejected. Mariolini was detained in the prison of Pavia until 2021.

== Mariolini autobiography ==
Before the murder of Calò, Mariolini wrote the autobiographical book Il cacciatore di anoressiche (The anorexic hunter), in which he recounted having a paraphilic disorder that had always led him to sexually desire anorexic and skeletal women. Mariolini, previously married and with two children, said that after the separation he sought female company through advertisements. This was how he met the 29-year-old Monica Calò (in the book known as Barbara).

During the presentation of the work on 12 May 1997 at the Palazzo delle Assicurazioni, Mariolini admitted that he was potentially dangerous.

The 2004 film First Love (Primo amore) by Matteo Garrone is partially based on the facts recounted in the book.
