= First Love (2004 Italian film) =

2004 Italian drama film

Primo Amore
- Directed by: Matteo Garrone
- Written by: Matteo Garrone; Massimo Gaudioso
- Produced by: Domenico Procacci
- Starring: Vitaliano Trevisan; Michela Cescon
- Cinematography: Marco Onorato
- Edited by: Marco Spoletini
- Music by: Banda Osiris
- Production company: Fandango
- Release date: 13 February 2004
- Running time: 100 minutes
- Country: Italy
- Language: Italian

First Love (Italian: Primo Amore) is an Italian 2004 drama film directed by Matteo Garrone and Massimo Gaudioso, loosely based on the autobiographical novel by Marco Mariolini. The film deals with anorexia nervosa.

== Plot ==
Vittorio, a Veronese goldsmith, meets Sonia through a blind date; the two begin to date and thereby to get to know each other, notwithstanding some initial doubts about the possibility of success of their relationship: Vittorio is having therapy due to his obsession with thin women up to the point of anorexia nervosa. Their relationship continues as Sonia agrees to lose weight — ignoring the man’s psychopathy — which she seemingly does as an act of love, not through her own desire.

What at first seems only a benign choice turns into a nightmare for Sonia, made worse because the two have chosen to live together. Vittorio becomes increasingly suspicious of Sonia, thinking (somewhat correctly) that she eats in secret. He therefore hides the food in her house such that she can only eat salad and vegetables.

Sonia becomes very thin, and begins to dislike herself. Her imprisonment becomes increasingly difficult and begins to be detrimental to her health. Due to the shared obsession with her weight, the two often find themselves in embarrassing situations in public. Furthermore, Vittorio’s business is getting worse and worse, ultimately leading to the closure of his laboratory.

One evening, Sonia has a crisis in a restaurant, due to her hunger. On returning home, Vittorio loses his temper and humiliates her, forcing her to be naked and throwing the food she had managed to hide into the fireplace. Having reached the limit, in order to free herself, Sonia commits an extreme gesture so, taking advantage of a moment of distraction from Vittorio, she grabs the fire iron and kills him by hitting him on the head.

== Production ==
Michela Cescon actually lost 15 kilograms (over 30 pounds) in weight during the making of the film, as the director wanted.

== Reception ==
First Love has an approval rating of 53% on review aggregator website Rotten Tomatoes, based on 19 reviews, and an average rating of 5.8/10. Metacritic assigned the film a weighted average score of 57 out of 100, based on 8 critics, indicating "mixed or average reviews". As of October 2024, the film has a rating of 6.6/10 on IMDB, from approximately 1,900 user reviews.

The film "has been described as “a horror movie about desire,” which seems fitting." Kevin Thomas of the Los Angeles Times finds this film "an elegantly told tale of obsession that, in failing to take on any larger meaning, rapidly becomes depressing to watch." Thomas and others are confused as to "why she [Sonia] strives so mightily to please someone so obviously insane."

=== Awards ===
Banda Osiris won the 2004 Silver Berlin Bear for Best Film Music. The band won at other festivals, too. At the Flaiano Film Festival, Michela Cescon won for Best Actress and Marco Onorato won for Best Cinematography.

== See also ==
- List of Italian films of 2004
