= The Past Is a Foreign Land =

- Directed by: Daniele Vicari
- Written by: Francesco Carofiglio; Gianrico Carofiglio; Massimo Gaudioso; Daniele Vicari
- Starring: Elio Germano; Michele Riondino
- Cinematography: Gherardo Gossi
- Edited by: Marco Spoletini
- Music by: Teho Teardo
- Production companies: Fandango; R&C Produzioni
- Release date: 26 October 2008 (Rome Film Festival)
- Country: Italy
- Language: Italian

The Past Is a Foreign Land (Italian: Il passato è una terra straniera) is a 2008 Italian neo-noir film directed by Daniele Vicari. It is based on the novel with the same name written by Gianrico Carofiglio, who also collaborated to the screenplay. It entered the competition at the 2008 Rome International Film Festival, in which Michele Riondino was awarded best actor.

== Plot ==
In Bari, Giorgio, a classic good guy and a law graduate, feels a bit out of place in circles he frequents with his girlfriend. During an elegant Christmas party he defends a stranger, Francesco, with whom he forms a friendship that introduces him to a world totally unknown to him, that of gambling - poker - at which the two cheat. The new experiences intoxicate Giorgio and pull him into situations beyond his comprehension; he is out of his league.

The young man is progressively engulfed by a whirlwind of illegality and immorality: he regularly visits the house of a married woman, buys a luxurious car with the proceeds of poker, and reacts violently to the questions of his parents, who worry more and more. One day Francesco informs him of his imminent departure for Spain; Giorgio decides to follow him despite discovering, with an initial repulsion soon overwhelmed by excitement, that his friend intends to devote himself to the cocaine trade.

After returning to Bari, Francesco disappears. One night Giorgio tracks him down as he leaves a club; shortly after Francesco chases Antonia, the bartender who works there, and attacks her. Giorgio intervenes, a fight arises and the carabinieri arrive. After being beaten extensively by the carabinieri, Giorgio is released because the girl testifies on his behalf. He also claims to the commander that he only vaguely knows Francesco, who was also beaten by the carabinieri. Giorgio catches a last glance of Francesco through a window as he leaves the carabinieri station.

Some time later, Giorgio is an established lawyer; Antonia approaches him to thank him for having saved her the night of the attempted violence. Without speaking, Giorgio watches her go.

== Cast ==
- Elio Germano: Giorgio
- Michele Riondino: Francesco
- Chiara Caselli: Maria
- Valentina Lodovini: Antonia
- Marco Baliani: Franco
- Daniela Poggi: Anna
- María Jurado: Ángela
- Romina Carrisi: Giulia
- Lorenza Indovina: Alessandra

== See also ==
- List of Italian films of 2008
