= Reality (2012 film) =

2012 Italian drama film

- Theatrical release poster
- Directed by: Matteo Garrone
- Written by: Maurizio Braucci; Ugo Chiti; Matteo Garrone; Massimo Gaudioso
- Produced by: Domenico Procacci; Matteo Garrone
- Starring: Aniello Arena; Loredana Simioli; Claudia Gerini
- Cinematography: Marco Onorato
- Edited by: Marco Spoletini
- Music by: Alexandre Desplat
- Production companies: Fandango; Archimede; Le Pacte; Rai Cinema
- Distributed by: 01 Distribution
- Release date: 18 May 2012 (Cannes)
- Running time: 115 minutes
- Countries: Italy; France
- Languages: Neapolitan; Italian

Reality is a 2012 Italian drama film directed by Matteo Garrone and stars Aniello Arena, Loredana Simioli, and Claudia Gerini. The narrative is set in the world of reality television, and follows a Neapolitan fishmonger who participates in Grande Fratello, the Italian version of Big Brother. The film won the Grand Prix award at the 2012 Cannes Film Festival.

== Plot ==
Grande Fratello (Big Brother) is a reality television program about people who live in a fictional house with their day-to-day actions filmed and broadcast. Luciano, a young fishmonger married with children who lives in Naples, is attracted to this show that is famous in Italy. The program is superficial and silly but well liked by the public, especially Luciano, the protagonist of the film. After a festive and vulgar marriage between relatives, Luciano returns to his poor life selling fish in the city. Luciano's friends, who are ignorant and dishonest, decide to persuade Luciano to audition for a part as one of the boys in Big Brother. Naively, Luciano is convinced and decides to go to Cinecittà in Rome to audition. At the audition the committee finds Luciano pleasant, though insignificant, and the assistant director dismisses him, saying he will be contacted if selected for the program. However, when Luciano returns to his neighborhood in Naples, he begins going crazy while waiting to hear from the assistant director. He believes he is being watched by hidden cameras from the television program he loves so much and is really happy about them. Luciano believes that appearing generous will win him the part on Big Brother, so he begins to give small gifts to the poor of the city, then spends large amounts of money giving away more expensive items, such as furniture, from his house. His wife and other relatives despair and believe that Luciano is out of his mind. His wife is especially worried and bursts into tears when she meets a friend of Luciano. She asks him why her husband has become so strange and, although he feels a deep sorrow for Luciano's tearful wife, he does not know how to answer. Luciano continues to get worse and is seen laughing for no reason. Finally, he makes a pilgrimage to Rome, and becomes obsessed with studying for his part in Big Brother, which is now his only reason for living.

== Cast ==
- Aniello Arena as Luciano
- Loredana Simioli as Maria
- Claudia Gerini as Grande Fratello
- Paola Minaccioni as Roman woman
- Ciro Petrone as barista
- Nunzia Schiano as Aunt Nunzia
- Nando Paone as Michele
- Arturo Gambardella as policeman

== Production ==
After winning acclaim with his 2008 crime film Gomorrah, director Matteo Garrone wanted a key change for his next project, and decided to make a comedy. The screenplay for Reality is based on a true story. Garrone describes it as "a simple, working-class tale", not intended as a political treatise. However, it did develop into a darker film than originally planned, and Garrone has expressed doubt as to whether the finished version can be described as a comedy.

The film was produced by Fandango and the director's company Archimede. It received co-production support from Rai Cinema and France's Le Pacte. It also received financial backing from Garance Capital. The 11-week recording began on 5 May 2011. Filming took place in Naples and Rome. The film had the production title Big House.

Actor Aniello Arena, who plays the protagonist, is a convicted former member of the Camorra who was discovered by director Garrone at a theater play staged by the inmates of the Volterra prison. He has served life in prison for murder since 1991. Garrone sought special permission for him to appear in Gomorrah and was denied, but kept him in mind and insisted for this film.

== Release ==
The film was selected for the main competition of the 2012 Cannes Film Festival. It is Garrone's third time at Cannes; his 2002 film The Embalmer was screened in the Directors' Fortnight section, and Gomorrah played in competition in 2008 and won the Grand Prix.

== Reception ==
=== Critical response ===
On review aggregator Rotten Tomatoes, the film holds an approval rating of 80% based on 79 reviews, with an average rating of 7/10. The website's critical consensus reads, "Part dark satire, part compelling drama, Reality occasionally struggles to communicate its message, but it's never less than entertaining." On Metacritic, the film has a weighted average score of 76 out of 100, based on 21 critics, indicating "generally favorable reviews".

=== Awards and nominations ===
The film was nominated for the Palme d'Or and won the Grand Prix at the 2012 Cannes Film Festival.
