= Italian ship Salvatore Todaro =

Salvatore Todaro was the name of at least two ships of the Italian Navy named in honour of Salvatore Todaro and may refer to:

- Italian corvette Salvatore Todaro (F 550), a Pietro de Cristofaro-class corvette launched in 1964 and stricken in 1994.
- Italian submarine Salvatore Todaro (S 526), a Todaro-class submarine launched in 2003
