= Kidnapped (2023 film) =

2023 historical drama film

- Italian: Rapito
- Directed by: Marco Bellocchio
- Screenplay by: Marco Bellocchio; Susanna Nicchiarelli
- Based on: Il caso Mortara by Daniele Scalise
- Produced by: Beppe Caschetto; Simone Gattoni
- Starring: Enea Sala; Leonardo Maltese; Paolo Pierobon; Fausto Russo Alesi; Barbara Ronchi
- Cinematography: Francesco Di Giacomo
- Edited by: Francesca Calvelli; Stefano Mariotti
- Music by: Fabio Massimo Capogrosso
- Production companies: IBC Movie; Kavac Film; Rai Cinema; Ad Vitam Production; Match Factory Productions
- Distributed by: 01 Distribution; Ad Vitam Distribution; Pandora Film Verleih
- Release dates: 23 May 2023 (Cannes); 25 May 2023 (Italy); 1 November 2023 (France); 16 November 2023 (Germany)
- Running time: 125 minutes
- Countries: Italy; France; Germany
- Languages: Italian; Latin; Hebrew; Emilian
- Box office: $4.1 million

Kidnapped (Italian: Rapito), released in the US as Kidnapped: The Abduction of Edgardo Mortara, is a 2023 historical drama film co-written and directed by Marco Bellocchio, about Edgardo Mortara, a young Jewish boy who was taken from his family by the Papal States and raised as a Catholic. It is loosely based on Daniele Scalise's book Il caso Mortara. It is a co-production between Italy, France and Germany.

The film was selected to compete for the Palme d'Or at the 76th Cannes Film Festival, where it premiered on 23 May 2023. It was theatrically released in Italy on 25 May. It received 11 nominations at the 69th David di Donatello, and won 5 awards, including Best Adapted Screenplay.

== Plot ==
In 1851, Edgardo Mortara is the sixth child of a Jewish family from the city of Bologna, part of the Papal States. Believing him sick and dying, the Christian maid Anna Morisi administers baptism in secret, for fear that when he dies he will end up in limbo. The child survives, but seven years later Anna tells Pier Gaetano Feletti, head of the Bolognese office of the Holy Inquisition, about the baptism: the sacrament would have made the child irrevocably Catholic, and since the laws of the Papal States forbid a Christian to be raised by non-Christians, Feletti decides to remove the child from his family. On 24 June, Edgardo was forcibly taken and brought to Rome, where he would stay in the Casa dei Catecumeni, the boarding school for the children of converted Jews.

Edgardo's parents, Momolo and Marianna, do everything to draw public attention to the case, arousing the indignation of European and non-European intellectuals. However, this causes Pope Pius IX to take the matter to heart: the papacy is in fact in a moment of acute political crisis, the pope having lost prestige and authority and being seen as a reactionary impediment to the Unification of Italy. Pius IX decides to stand up to all the accusations, personally taking care of Edgardo's education and having him publicly administered a second (canonically unnecessary) baptism or reception to dispel any doubts about his belonging to the Catholic Church. Edgardo is raised and educated in a completely Catholic environment.

Months after Edgardo's arrival in Rome, Momolo and Marianna obtain permission to visit him. Members of the Roman Jewish community coldly welcome the two, as they are afraid of losing the privileges granted by the pope due to the media outcry aroused by the affair. Momolo, therefore, decides to treat Edgardo with detachment, telling him only that he's happy to find him in good health; in front of Marianna, however, the child bursts into tears and reveals to his mother that he still secretly recites the Shema Yisrael every night. Those in charge of Edgardo's education therefore forbid any future visits, unless the whole family converts to Catholicism. The Mortaras refuse and organize an attempted kidnapping of the child, which however fails and causes the total loss of support from the Jews of Rome.

In 1859, after the Second Italian War of Independence, Bologna was taken from the pope by rioters. The judicial authorities of the Kingdom of Sardinia, which then exercised jurisdiction in the city, arrest Pier Gaetano Feletti and put him on trial in the Mortara case. During the hearings, the whole story is reconstructed and it is discovered that the baptism administered by Anna Morisi is valid to all intents and purposes. The second baptism ceremony is not relevant. Feletti is acquitted of the charges, as he acted in full compliance with the laws in force at the time of the events. Edgardo remains in Rome. The Pope is still sovereign there because of military assistance from France under Napoleon III. In 1870 with the commencement of the Franco-Prussian War, the French troops are withdrawn, the Kingdom of Italy occupies Rome and the eleven-hundred-year history of the Papal States comes to an end with Pope Pius IX losing his temporal power.

Meanwhile, Edgardo grows up in the care of the Pope. He studies for the priesthood and assumes the clerical name of Pio Maria. In 1870, with the breach of Porta Pia, Rome becomes part of the Kingdom of Italy. One of Edgardo's older brothers, Riccardo, who is a soldier in the occupying army, runs to look for him and tells him that he can finally return home. However, Edgardo refuses, stating that his real family is now the Catholic church. When Pius IX dies in 1878, Edgardo, in an impulsive act, joins the rioters who wish to throw his coffin into the Tiber. He regrets his action and runs away.

Years later, Marianna, Edgardo's mother, is dying and Edgardo, who years earlier had refused to go to his father's funeral, finally returns home. Taking advantage of a moment when he is alone with his mother, the young man tries to baptise her, but she refuses, declaring that she lives as a Jew and wants to die as a Jew.

Edgardo is driven away by his siblings after this attempted conversion. This appears to be his family's final break with Edgardo. The film's closing credits state that Edgardo was ordained as a priest in the Canons Regular, worked throughout Europe as a missionary and preacher and that he died in a monastery in Belgium in 1940 at the age of 88.

== Cast ==
- Enea Sala as Edgardo Mortara, as a young boy
- Leonardo Maltese as Edgardo Mortara, as a young adult
- Paolo Pierobon as Pope Pius IX
- Fausto Russo Alesi as Salomone "Momolo" Mortara
- Barbara Ronchi as Marianna Mortara
- Andrea Gherpelli as Angelo Padovani
- Samuele Teneggi as Riccardo Mortara
- Corrado Invernizzi as Judge Carboni
- Filippo Timi as Giacomo Antonelli
- Fabrizio Gifuni as Pier Gaetano Feletti
- Paolo Calabresi as Sabatino Scazzocchio
- Alessandro Fiorucci as Padre Domenicano
- Alessandro Bandini as Padre Mariano

== Production ==
Kidnapped was written by Marco Bellocchio and Susanna Nicchiarelli with the collaboration of Edoardo Albinati and Daniela Ceselli. Pina Totaro acted as a historical consultant. The film was edited by Francesca Calvelli and Stefano Mariotti. Francesco Di Giacomo served as the director of photography. Original music was provided by Fabio Massimo Capogrosso.

A film about the life of Edgardo Mortara was originally planned by American filmmaker Steven Spielberg, however, according to Bellocchio, the project was paused when Spielberg could not find the right child actor to play the part of Edgardo. Bellocchio has commented that he believes the film would not be accurately told by performers who do not speak Italian: "The film cannot be made in a language other than Italian with regional Italian accents. It would have been a different film if it was shot in English."

The film was produced by Beppe Caschetto and Simone Gattoni through IBC Movie and Kavac Film with Rai Cinema in coproduction with Ad Vitam Production (France) and The Match Factory (Germany), co-produced with the participation of Canal+, Ciné+ and BR/Arte France Cinéma in association with Film-und Medienstiftung NRW with the support of the Île-de-France region.

Filming began on 27 June 2022 in Roccabianca, where mid-19th century Bologna was rebuilt. The following month, shooting moved to Sabbioneta. Additional filming took place on location in Rome and Paris. In January 2023, outdoor shooting was carried out for two days in Bologna's Piazza Maggiore, including inside the halls of the Palazzo d'Accursio.

== Release ==
Kidnapped was selected to compete for the Palme d'Or at the 2023 Cannes Film Festival, where it had its world premiere on 23 May 2023. The film was theatrically released in Italy by 01 Distribution on 25 May 2023. Following screening at the 2023 New York Film Festival, it was also invited at the 28th Busan International Film Festival in 'Icon' section and was screened on 6 October 2023.

It was released in France by Ad Vitam on 1 November 2023, under the title L'Enlèvement. Pandora Film Verleih is scheduled to release the film in Germany on 16 November 2023, under the title Die Bologna-Entführung – Geraubt im Namen des Papstes.

Kidnapped was released in cinemas in Ireland and the United Kingdom and on Curzon Home Cinema on 26 April 2024. Cohen Media Group distributed the film in the United States on 24 May 2024, with the title Kidnapped: The Abduction of Edgardo Mortara.

== Reception ==
=== Critical response ===
On Rotten Tomatoes, the film holds an approval rating of 86% based on 70 reviews, with an average rating of 7.4/10. The website's critics consensus reads: "Based on indefensible truths, Kidnapped tackles institutional abuse with cinematic pomp and political circumstance." On Metacritic, the film has a weighted average score of 75 out of 100, based on 17 critics, indicating "generally favorable" reviews.

=== Accolades ===
Award	Date of ceremony	Category	Recipient(s)	Result	Ref.
Cannes Film Festival	27 May 2023	Palme d'Or	Marco Bellocchio	Nominated	
César Awards	23 February 2024	Best Foreign Film	Kidnapped	Nominated	
David di Donatello	3 May 2024	Best Film	Kidnapped	Nominated	
David di Donatello	3 May 2024	Best Director	Marco Bellocchio	Nominated	
David di Donatello	3 May 2024	Best Actress	Barbara Ronchi	Nominated	
David di Donatello	3 May 2024	Best Adapted Screenplay	Marco Bellocchio, Susanna Nicchiarelli	Won	
David di Donatello	3 May 2024	Best Cinematography	Francesco Di Giacomo	Nominated	
David di Donatello	3 May 2024	Best Production Design	Andrea Castorina, Valeria Vecellio	Won	
David di Donatello	3 May 2024	Best Editing	Francesca Calvelli, Stefano Mariotti	Nominated	
David di Donatello	3 May 2024	Best Costumes	Sergio Ballo, Daria Calvelli	Won	
David di Donatello	3 May 2024	Best Visual Effects	Rodolfo Migliari, Lena Di Gennaro	Nominated	
David di Donatello	3 May 2024	Best Make-up	Enrico Iacoponi	Won	
David di Donatello	3 May 2024	Best Hairstyling	Alberta Giuliani	Won	
Nastro d'Argento	20 June 2023	Best Film	Marco Bellocchio	Won	
Nastro d'Argento	20 June 2023	Best Director	Marco Bellocchio	Won	
Nastro d'Argento	20 June 2023	Best Screenplay	Marco Bellocchio, Susanna Nicchiarelli	Won	
Nastro d'Argento	20 June 2023	Best Actress	Barbara Ronchi	Won	
Nastro d'Argento	20 June 2023	Best Supporting Actor	Paolo Pierobon	Won	
Nastro d'Argento	20 June 2023	Best Editing	Francesca Calvelli, Stefano Mariotti	Won	
Nastro d'Argento	20 June 2023	Guglielmo Biraghi Award	Leonardo Maltese	Won	
Nastro d'Argento	20 June 2023	Best Actor	Fausto Russo Alesi	Nominated	
Nastro d'Argento	20 June 2023	Best Cinematography	Francesco Di Giacomo	Nominated	
Nastro d'Argento	20 June 2023	Best Production Design	Andrea Castorina	Nominated	
Valladolid International Film Festival	28 October 2023	Golden Spike	Kidnapped	Nominated	
Valladolid International Film Festival	28 October 2023	Best Screenplay	Marco Bellocchio, Susanna Nicchiarelli	Won	
