= Leonardo Maltese =

Italian-English actor

- Born: 28 October 1997 (age 28); Ravenna, Italy
- Citizenship: Italian, British
- Education: Accademia teatrale di Roma Sofia Amendolea
- Occupations: Actor; singer
- Years active: 2020–present
- Known for: Kidnapped

Leonardo Maltese (born 28 October 1997) is an Italian-English actor and singer.

== Biography ==
Maltese was born in Ravenna from a Sicilian father and an English mother. After studying in England he moved to Rome to attend the Accademia teatrale di Roma Sofia Amendolea. In 2020 he launched his first single, Tourmalet, and his first EP, Salmoni, under the stage name of Leo Fulcro. He released his first album in 2021, entitled Il Mondo che Cambia.

He made his acting debut in 2022, when he played Ettore Tagliaferri in the film by Gianni Amelio Lord of the Ants. The film, presented in competition at the 79th Venice International Film Festival, tells the story of the writer Aldo Braibanti, played by Luigi Lo Cascio, protagonist of the so-called "Braibanti case". For his performance he was awarded the New Talent Award.

In 2023, he played Edgardo Mortara as a young man in Marco Bellocchio's film Kidnapped, presented at the Cannes Film Festival. At the 2023 Nastri d'argento awards ceremony, he won the Guglielmo Biraghi Award for his performance in the films Lord of the Ants and Kidnapped. He also poirtrayed the stylist Gianni Versace in Mimmo Calopresti's film, Gianni Versace: L'Imperatore dei sogni.

In 2024 Maltese played Giacomo Leopardi in the tv serie Leopardi - Il poeta dell'infinito directed by Sergio Rubini. That year he also released his second EP, Boy on Earth. The following year he portrays Ragusìn in L'Abbaglio, set to be realised January 16, 2025, directed by Roberto Andò.

== Filmography ==
=== Film ===
Year	Title	Role(s)	Notes
2022	Lord of the Ants	Ettore Tagliaferri	
2023	Kidnapped	Edgardo Mortara	
2023	Gianni Versace – L'imperatore dei sogni	Gianni Versace	
2025	The Illusion	Lt. Ragusìn	
2027	The Resurrection of the Christ: Part One †	TBA	Post-production
2028	The Resurrection of the Christ: Part Two †	TBA	Post-production

=== Television ===
Year	Title	Role(s)	Notes
2025	Leopardi – Il poeta infinito	Giacomo Leopardi	Two-parts television movie

== Discography ==
=== Studio albums ===
- 2021: Il Mondo Che Cambia

=== EPs ===
- 2020: Salmoni
- 2024: Boy on Earth

=== Singles ===
- 2020: Tourmalet
- 2020: Ti Scriverei
- 2021: Babilonia
- 2021: Incubo
- 2021: Tutto Bene
- 2022: Scegli Me
- 2023: Yin e Yang
- 2023: La Mappa
- 2024: Spy Kids (feat. GIOVAPIÙGIOVA)
- 2024: Everyday

== Awards ==
- David di Donatello
  - 2023: Italian revelation for Lord of the Ants and Kidnapped
- Nastro d'argento
  - 2023: Guglielmo Biraghi award for Kidnapped
- Venice Film Festival
  - 2022: Imaie Talent Award for Lord of the Ants
