= The Young Montalbano =

Italian television series

- Italian logo
- Also known as: Il giovane Montalbano
- Genre: Police procedural
- Written by: Francesco Bruni; Andrea Camilleri
- Directed by: Gianluca Maria Tavarelli
- Starring: Michele Riondino
- Theme music composer: Andrea Guerra (music); Davide Camarrone (lyrics)
- Opening theme: "Curri, curri" (sung by Olivia Sellerio)
- Ending theme: "Vuci mia cantannu vai" (sung by Olivia Sellerio)
- Composer: Andrea Guerra
- Country of origin: Italy
- Original languages: Italian; Sicilian
- No. of series: 2
- No. of episodes: 12

Production
- Executive producer: Gianfranco Barbagallo
- Producers: Carlo Degli Esposti; Nora Barbieri; Max Gusberti
- Production locations: Ragusa; Scicli
- Cinematography: Lorenzo Adorisio (Season 1); Mario Pieroni (Season 2)
- Editor: Alessandro Heffler
- Running time: 120 minutes
- Production companies: Rai Fiction; Palomar

Original release
- Network: Rai 1
- Release: 23 February 2012 – 19 October 2015

Related
- Inspector Montalbano

The Young Montalbano (Italian: Il giovane Montalbano) is an Italian television spin-off produced and broadcast by Radiotelevisione Italiana (RAI) in 2012 and 2015. It is a prequel to the Inspector Montalbano (Il commissario Montalbano) series that are based on the detective novels of Andrea Camilleri. The setting is the fictional town of Vigàta, Sicily.

The first series was originally broadcast during February and March 2012 by Rai 1 in Italy. It was broadcast in the United States by MHz WorldView during October and November 2012. The BBC acquired the series in late 2012, and the first episode was broadcast by BBC Four in the UK on 7 September 2013.

In April 2012, it was reported that filming for a second series should start in late 2013. It was delayed until August 2014. The second series was broadcast in Italy during September and October 2015.

== Characters ==
- Commissario Salvo Montalbano – Michele Riondino. Newly appointed police chief of Vigata.
- Vice commissario Domenico "Mimì" Augello – Alessio Vassallo. Montalbano's deputy and self-proclaimed womaniser.
- Carmine Fazio – Andrea Tidona. Veteran police officer; Montalbano's deputy.
- Agatino Catarella – Fabrizio Pizzuto. Police officer; operates the telephone.
- Giuseppe Fazio – Beniamino Marcone. Carmine's son; joins the department as an investigator and quickly becomes a most trusted assistant.
- Livia Burlando – Sarah Felberbaum. Genoese girl with whom Montalbano has a relationship.
- Gallo – Maurilio Leto. Police officer and investigator, squad car driver.
- Paternò – Alessio Piazza. Police officer and investigator.
- Montalbano's father – Adriano Chiaramida. Widower. They jointly own a vineyard just outside Vigata.
- Nicolò Zito – Carmelo Galati. Journalist and anchor of the local TV news channel Rete Libera. Montalbano is aware that having the press on his side will be beneficial to his investigating.
- Dr. Pasquano – Giuseppe Santostefano. Forensic medical examiner.
- Adelina Cirrinciò – Alessandra Costanzo. Montalbano's cook and housekeeper.
- Alabiso – Massimo De Rossi. Montalbano's superior officer; head of the provincial police force.

== Critical reception ==
Emily Jupp, in The Independent on Sunday, wrote, "There are a few nods to TV detectives past. Questioning a policeman in Vigata, he turned to go, then in a perfect pastiche of Columbo, asked, 'and one more thing...' This being Italy, the question isn't about a clue, but about food, and soon his yearning for linguine alla vongole has been sated." She concluded by writing, "The niche appeal and subtitles might be a bit of a barrier, but by the end of the two-hour episode, I'd really warmed to this compelling Italian. Riondino's Montalbano could give Cumberbatch's Sherlock a run for his money."

Keith Watson, in the Metro, wrote, "Just as Shaun Evans makes for a physically unlikely but entirely credible young Inspector Morse, so Riondino gives the part of Montalbano an entirely convincing and individual interpretation. […] Even mundane procedural exchanges between cops in the station took on a kind of poetic lilt, weaving a hypnotic brand of Mediterranean magic. […] The feeling was the one you get when curled up with a book on holiday while the sun sets and you're on your second cocktail. Unfolding at a leisurely two hours, with no sense of urgency and no ad breaks, The Young Montalbano had plenty of time to slip local colour into the pair of murder stories that unfolded in laconic ... fashion. It was a rare thing: a crime thriller that teased and circled its prey, rarely breaking into a sweat. Fans of subtitled Euro treats, walk this way."

Gabriel Tate, reviewing the first episode in the London edition of Time Out, wrote, "The Young Morse? Well, Endeavour was pretty good. The Young Lund? Crying out to be made. But The Young Montalbano? Neither especially troubled nor notably enigmatic, the Sicilian detective has never been one of television's more intriguing characters, with the appeal of his show limited to the spectacular scenery and guessing which actor would chew through it the most during the course of that week's investigation. As origin stories go, this isn't exactly Batman Begins, although we learn that he did once have a full head of hair". Overall, he found the opener "Dull, dull, dull – for two hours."

On 11 June 2021, The Young Montalbano had a rating of 7.7/10 on the Internet Movie Database (IMDb).

== Episodes ==
=== Series 1 (2012) ===
No. overall	No. in season	Title	Directed by	Written by	Original release date
1	1	"La prima indagine di Montalbano" "Montalbano's First Case"	Gianluca Maria Tavarelli	Francesco Bruni; Andrea Camilleri	23 February 2012
Montalbano, age 33, is a deputy inspector in the Sicilian mountains. A local thug with a history of theft is murdered and the evidence points to an elderly shepherd as the killer. Montalbano is promoted to inspector and is transferred to Vigàta, where he grew up. He unravels the mystery of why a girl attempted to murder a judge. A few characters who feature in Inspector Montalbano are introduced.
2	2	"Capodanno" "New Year's Day"	Gianluca Maria Tavarelli	Francesco Bruni; Andrea Camilleri	1 March 2012
The owner of the hotel in which Montalbano is living is shot dead on New Year's Eve. Was it an accident or something more sinister? Also, a dying woman's last words lead him to re-open a 40-year-old murder case, which may have resulted in a miscarriage of justice.
3	3	"Ritorno alle origini" "Back to Basics"	Gianluca Maria Tavarelli	Francesco Bruni; Andrea Camilleri	8 March 2012
Montalbano clashes with his new deputy "Mimì" Augello when they investigate two unusual cases; in the first a box of worthless beer bottle caps are stolen from the house of a compulsive hoarder, and in the second a small child is apparently kidnapped, only to be released two hours later without any ransom demand being made.
4	4	"Ferito a morte" "Mortally Wounded"	Gianluca Maria Tavarelli	Francesco Bruni; Andrea Camilleri	15 March 2012
Montalbano investigates the murder of a loan shark, for which there is initially no shortage of suspects, but the later discovery of another body nearby complicates matters. Meanwhile, someone is putting up posters around Vigàta asking the inhabitants to vote in a referendum about the reputation of a politician's wife.
5	5	"Il terzo segreto" "The Third Secret"	Gianluca Maria Tavarelli	Francesco Bruni; Andrea Camilleri	22 March 2012
Montalbano receives a letter informing him of the accidental death of a worker at a construction site - posted before the man died. It turns out to be the latest in a series of similar "accidents", but he must act unofficially as the case is under the jurisdiction of the Carabinieri. Also, after someone shot at the noticeboard containing announcements of upcoming weddings, he must find out who is trying to prevent a marriage and why.
6	6	"Sette lunedì" "Seven Mondays"	Gianluca Maria Tavarelli	Francesco Bruni; Andrea Camilleri	29 March 2012
Montalbano investigates the slaying of a wealthy man whose wastrel son seems like the obvious suspect, and a ritualistic series of animal killings leads him to conclude that someone is planning a murder.

=== Series 2 (2015) ===
No. overall	No. in season	Title	Directed by	Written by	Original release date
7	1	"L'uomo che andava appresso ai funerali" "The Man Who Followed Funerals"	Gianluca Maria Tavarelli	Francesco Bruni; Andrea Camilleri	14 September 2015
The murder of a disabled gentleman who shows up to mourn at other people's funerals seems to be a mystery until the death of a woman linked to the unlikely mourner's former employer gives Salvo his first lead.
8	2	"La Stanza Numero Due" "Room Number Two"	Gianluca Maria Tavarelli	Francesco Bruni; Andrea Camilleri	21 September 2015
While walking along the beach at night Salvo and Livia see an old Riviera Hotel on fire. One guest dies in the fire. There is suspicion that this fire is a Mafia warning.
9	3	"Morte In Mare Aperto" "Death on the High Seas"	Gianluca Maria Tavarelli	Francesco Bruni; Andrea Camilleri	28 September 2015
Salvo investigates the apparently accidental killing of a fisherman on a Vigata fishing boat and uncovers serious criminal activity in the process.
10	4	"La Transazione" "The Transaction", also "The Settlement"	Gianluca Maria Tavarelli	Francesco Bruni; Andrea Camilleri	5 October 2015
In this episode is a robbery (the theft of the contents of all of a new bank’s safe-deposit boxes), a circus with a fortune-teller, and three murders. Young Montalbano is faced with the complexities of the crimes, and with dilemmas in his private life.
11	5	"Il Ladro Onesto" "The Honest Thief"	Gianluca Maria Tavarelli	Francesco Bruni; Andrea Camilleri	12 October 2015
A beautiful waitress disappears, a child is kidnapped, and a spate of unusual thefts are woven into this episode. Circumstances lead Salvo to adopt unusual methods to solve the mysteries, while dealing with the disappointed reactions of his officers when they learn he has asked for a transfer to Genoa, to be closer to Livia.
12	6	"Un'albicocca" "An Apricot"	Gianluca Maria Tavarelli	Francesco Bruni; Andrea Camilleri	19 October 2015
Montalbano is preparing for his move to Genoa. Due to fly there in a few days, while driving with Livia, he sees a car has driven off the road and over a cliff. A young fashion model is found dead in the driver's seat. An apricot stone and a coral necklace provide clues. Despite red herrings thrown in his path by drug-dealers, Salvo takes the initiative and becomes thoroughly involved, even though his former Deputy, Inspector Mimi Augello, has taken over as Vigata's official Chief of Police. On 23 May 1992, having solved the case, Montalbano leaves for the airport, but en route, at a crossroads, his options are: turn right, to the autostrade (motorway) leading to the airport, or turn left, back to Vigata. He ponders and turns left. When he arrives in Vigata, it is deserted. Salvo hears on the radio news of the explosion at Capaci, resulting in the death (assassination) of Giovanni Falcone, an anti-Mafia judge, and those with him. The police escort and some civilians are also killed. In Vigata's police station, Salvo finds the officers in a state of shock and despair. Next, we see Montalbano speaking on the phone to Livia, who says, "You stay there. It's where you belong. You stay there, Salvo."
