= Palazzina Laf =

2023 film

- Directed by: Michele Riondino
- Written by: Maurizio Braucci; Michele Riondino
- Produced by: Carlo Degli Esposti; Nicola Serra
- Starring: Michele Riondino; Elio Germano
- Cinematography: Claudio Cofrancesco
- Edited by: Julien Panzarasa
- Music by: Teho Teardo
- Production companies: Bravo; Palomar; Rai Cinema; Paprika Films
- Distributed by: BiM Distribution
- Release dates: 21 October 2023 (Rome); 30 November 2023 (Italy)
- Running time: 99 minutes
- Countries: Italy; France
- Language: Italian

Palazzina Laf is a 2023 Italian-French drama film co-written and directed by Michele Riondino in his directorial debut and starring along with Elio Germano. The film is about a spy working for a corrupt company where a factory manager hires him to stalk his colleagues. The film's title acronym stands for "Laminatoio a freddo", which translates to "cold rolling mill". Palazzina Laf refers to the name of a real building of the ILVA steel company in Taranto, a banishment room where demoted employees were confined in inhumane working conditions in the late 1990s.

== Cast ==
- Michele Riondino as Caterino Lamanna
- Elio Germano as Giancarlo Basile
- Vanessa Scalera as Tiziana Lagioia
- Domenico Fortunato as Angelo Caramia
- Gianni D'Addario as Franco Orlando
- Michele Sinisi as Aldo Romanazzi
- Fulvio Pepe as Renato Morra
- Marina Limosani as Rosalba Liaci
- Eva Cela as Anna
- Anna Ferruzzo as Pubblico Ministero
- Paolo Pierobon as Moretti
- Pierfrancesco Nacca as Fabio

== Release ==
The film premiered in the Grand Public section at the 18th Rome Film Festival on 21 October 2023.

The film was distributed in Italian cinemas by BiM Distribuzione starting from 30 November 2023.

== Accolades ==
At the 69th David di Donatello, Palazzina Laf was nominated for Best New Director and Best Original Screenplay. Michele Riondino won Best Actor and Elio Germano won Best Supporting Actor. Diodato's "La mia terra" won Best Original Song.
