= A Brighter Tomorrow =

2023 comedy-drama film

- Theatrical release poster
- Italian: Il sol dell'avvenire
- Literally: The Sun of the Future
- Directed by: Nanni Moretti
- Written by: Francesca Marciano; Nanni Moretti; Federica Pontremoli; Valia Santella
- Produced by: Nanni Moretti; Domenico Procacci
- Starring: Nanni Moretti; Margherita Buy; Silvio Orlando; Mathieu Amalric; Barbora Bobuľová
- Cinematography: Michele D'Attanasio
- Edited by: Clelio Benevento
- Music by: Franco Piersanti
- Production companies: Sacher Film; Fandango; Rai Cinema; Le Pacte
- Distributed by: 01 Distribution; Le Pacte
- Release dates: 20 April 2023 (Italy); 24 May 2023 (Cannes); 28 June 2023 (France)
- Running time: 96 minutes
- Countries: Italy; France
- Language: Italian
- Budget: €12.3 million
- Box office: $6.7 million

A Brighter Tomorrow (Italian: Il sol dell'avvenire, lit. 'The Sun of the Future') is a 2023 Italian-French comedy-drama film co-written and directed by Nanni Moretti. Starring Moretti, Margherita Buy, Silvio Orlando and Mathieu Amalric, it follows Giovanni, an experienced filmmaker, through a personal and professional midlife crises.

The film was theatrically released in Italy on 20 April 2023 by 01 Distribution. Shortly after, it was selected to compete for the Palme d'Or at the 2023 Cannes Film Festival, where it was screened on 24 May 2023. It received seven nominations at the 69th David di Donatello awards.

== Synopsis ==
Giovanni is a director, who dreams to make a film adaptation from John Cheever's "The Swimmer" with a soundtrack made of many Italian pop songs. He is married to Paola, who works with him as a producer. Together they have a daughter, who is a musician. While Giovanni is busy shooting a film about the Hungarian Revolution of 1956, Paola starts working on another film production. Giovanni is resentful of Paola's extra professional engagement, as he feels she should concentrate on his career alone. Tension culminates during a visit Giovanni pays to the set of the film Paola is working on, where he openly criticises the director, the plot and the final scene they are shooting. Exasperated with Giovanni's attitude, Paola leaves him the next day. When Giovanni's film encounters financial troubles, Paola comes to his rescue by bringing in a team of South Korean producers. The events prove to have a deep effect on Giovanni, who decides to change the ending of his film and give it a more positive message.

== Cast ==
- Nanni Moretti as Giovanni
- Margherita Buy as Paola
- Silvio Orlando as Himself / Ennio Mastrogiovanni
- Mathieu Amalric as Pierre Cambou
- Barbora Bobuľová as Herself / Vera
- Zsolt Anger as Circus Director
- Jerzy Stuhr as Jerzy
- Teco Celi as Psychoanalyst
- Valentina Romani as Emma
- Arianna Pozzoli as Arianna
- Elena Lietti as Netflix Executive
- Flavio Furno as Edoardo
- Francesco Brandi as Property Master
- Michele Eburnea as Actor
- Laura Nardi as Makeup Artist
- Giuseppe Scoditti as Young Director
- Arianna Serrao as Costume Designer
- Blu Yoshimi as Actress
- Sun Hee You as Performer

== Production ==
Il sol dell'avvenire was co-written by Nanni Moretti with collaborators Francesca Marciano, Federica Pontremoli and Valia Santella. The film was co-produced by Moretti through Sacher Film and by Domenico Procacci through Fandango, with Rai Cinema and France's Le Pacte. It was produced in collaboration with France 3 Cinéma, with the participation of Canal+, Ciné+ and France Télévisions. Moretti called the film "complex and costly".

Filming began on 8 March 2022. Shooting took place at Cinecittà, as well as on the streets of Rome. In May 2022, scenes were shot on Rome's Via dei Fori Imperiali, with an elaborate procession featuring a band, extras, horses and elephants. Moretti's use of animals on set was criticized by animal rights groups, including Lega Anti Vivisezione (LAV). Filming wrapped on 21 June 2022.

== Release ==
Il sol dell'avvenire was selected to compete for the Palme d'Or at the 2023 Cannes Film Festival, where it was screened on 24 May 2023. The film was theatrically released in Italy by 01 Distribution on 20 April 2023, before its Cannes screening, which, although considered a rare privilege, is permitted by the festival's regulations. International sales were handled by Kinology. It was theatrically released in France by Le Pacte on 28 June 2023. It was also invited to the 27th Lima Film Festival in the Acclaimed section, where it was screened on 10 August 2023. It was also invited at the 28th Busan International Film Festival in 'Icon' section and was screened on 5 October 2023.

== Reception ==
=== Critical response ===
On Rotten Tomatoes, the film holds an approval rating of 54% based on 26 reviews, with an average rating of 5.9/10. The website's critics consensus reads: "Moretti's 8½, A Brighter Tomorrow vibrantly presents a myriad of rose-tinted ideas celebrating the love of cinema that dip too far into nostalgia and self-indulgence." On Metacritic, the film has a weighted average score of 47 out of 100, based on 8 critic reviews, indicating "mixed or average reviews".

Reviewing the film following its Cannes premiere, Peter Bradshaw of The Guardian called it "bafflingly awful: muddled, mediocre and metatextual – a complete waste of time, at once strident and listless."

French critics were more positive, including reviews by Le Monde's Jacques Mandelbaum, Le Figaro's Éric Neuhoff and Etienne Sorin, and Le Parisien's Catherine Balle.

=== Awards and nominations ===
Award	Date of ceremony	Category	Recipient(s)	Result	Ref.
Cannes Film Festival	27 May 2023	Palme d'Or	Nanni Moretti	Nominated	
David di Donatello	3 May 2024	Best Film	A Brighter Tomorrow	Nominated	
David di Donatello	3 May 2024	Best Director	Nanni Moretti	Nominated	
David di Donatello	3 May 2024	Best Supporting Actor	Silvio Orlando	Nominated	
David di Donatello	3 May 2024	Best Supporting Actress	Barbora Bobuľová	Nominated	
David di Donatello	3 May 2024	Best Original Screenplay	Francesca Marciano, Nanni Moretti, Federica Pontremoli, Valia Santella	Nominated	
David di Donatello	3 May 2024	Best Score	Franco Piersanti	Nominated	
David di Donatello	3 May 2024	Best Sound	Alessandro Zanon, Marta Billingsley, Daniele Quadroli, Paolo Segat	Nominated	
Miskolc International Film Festival	9 September 2023	Emeric Pressburger Prize for Best Feature Film	A Brighter Tomorrow	Nominated	
Nastro d'Argento	20 June 2023	Best Supporting Actress	Barbora Bobuľová	Won	
Nastro d'Argento	20 June 2023	Guglielmo Biraghi Award	Valentina Romani	Won	
Nastro d'Argento	20 June 2023	Best Film	Nanni Moretti	Nominated	
Nastro d'Argento	20 June 2023	Best Director	Nanni Moretti	Nominated	
Nastro d'Argento	20 June 2023	Best Screenplay	Francesca Marciano, Nanni Moretti, Federica Pontremoli, Valia Santella	Nominated	
Nastro d'Argento	20 June 2023	Best Actress	Margherita Buy	Nominated	
Nastro d'Argento	20 June 2023	Best Production Design	Alessandro Vannucci	Nominated	
Nastro d'Argento	20 June 2023	Best Sound	Alessandro Zanon	Nominated	
Nastro d'Argento	20 June 2023	Best Score (Note: Franco Piersanti nominated for his work on both A Brighter Tomorrow and Dry.)	Franco Piersanti	Nominated	

== See also ==
- Workers' Hymn
