= Loredana Simioli =

Italian actress, comedian, and TV host (1974–2019)

- Born: 27 February 1974; Naples, Italy
- Died: 26 June 2019 (aged 45); Naples, Italy
- Occupation(s): Actress, comedian, television host

Loredana Simioli (27 February 1974 – 26 June 2019) was an Italian actress, comedian and television host.

She often appeared on Canale 9, in particular on the TeleGaribaldi program.

== Biography ==
Born in Naples on February 27, 1974, she was the sister of Radio Marte presenter Gianni Simioli.

She began acting in the early 1990s and got her break in 1998 on Canale 9's TeleGaribaldi show, where she played the character of Mariarca. In the mid-2000s she left the television to work in movies; her cinematic roles included the role of Maria in the 2012 film Reality, which played at the Cannes Film Festival.

She died on June 26, 2019, at the age of 45, after a two-year battle with cancer. In the last period of her life she dedicated herself to cancer awareness with the campaign "Io non ho vergogna" (I have no shame), which culminated with the recording of a video clip in the Antonio Cardarelli hospital in Naples.

== Filmography ==
- L'amore buio – 2009
- Gorbaciof – 2010
- Reality – 2012
- Si accettano miracoli – 2014
- Perez. – 2014
- Troppo napoletano – 2016
- Nato a Casal di Principe – 2017
