= The Illusion (film) =

2025 comedy-drama film

- Directed by: Roberto Andò
- Screenplay by: Roberto Andò; Ugo Chiti; Massimo Gaudioso
- Starring: Toni Servillo; Salvo Ficarra; Valentino Picone; Tommaso Ragno; Giulia Andò; Leonardo Maltese; Pascal Greggory
- Cinematography: Maurizio Calvesi
- Edited by: Esmeralda Calabria
- Music by: Emanuele Bossi; Michele Braga
- Distributed by: 01 Distribution
- Release date: 16 January 2025
- Country: Italy
- Language: Italian

The Illusion (Italian: L'abbaglio, lit. 'The Blunder') is a 2025 Italian historical comedy-drama film co-written and directed by Roberto Andò. Taking place in Sicily during the Expedition of the Thousand, a key event in the unification of Italy, the film stars Toni Servillo and the comedy duo Ficarra e Picone.

== Plot ==
A Sicilian colonel leading a motley crew outwitting adversaries in Giuseppe Garibaldi's 1860 campaign that unified Italy.

== Cast ==
- Toni Servillo as Vincenzo Giordano Orsini
- Salvatore Ficarra as Domenico Tricò
- Valentino Picone as Rosario Spitale
- Tommaso Ragno as Giuseppe Garibaldi
- Giulia Andò as Assuntina
- Leonardo Maltese as Lt. Ragusin
- Andrea Gherpelli as Veteran from Bergamo
- Daniele Gonciaruk as Nino Bixio
- Vincenzo Pirrotta as Sovrastante
- Aurora Quattrocchi as the Mother
- Filippo Luna as Major of Sambuca
- Pascal Greggory as Jean Luc Von Mechel
- Giulia Lazzarini as Maddalena Orsini
- Clara Ponsot as Rose

== Production ==
The film was shot between Palermo, Trapani, Erice, Caltabellotta, Ficuzza, and Contessa Entellina. It was produced by Tramp Ltd and Bibi Film in association with Rai Cinema and Medusa Film and in collaboration with Netflix. Roberto Andò described it as "a film about the paradoxes of history" and "about the Italian character: cunning, passionate, generous, opportunistic, courageous, individualistic, cynical, and idealistic".

== Release ==
The film was released in Italian cinemas by 01 Distribution on 16 January 2025.

== Reception ==
Deborah Young from The Film Verdict described the film as a combination between "a wary humanism with expert storytelling" and wrote: "For the lovers of classic Italian movies full of sweeping historical drama, stunning natural sets and perfectly cued acting, with a solid vein of light comedy thrown in for good measure, one need look no farther than The Illusion".

Camillo De Marco from Cineuropa also praised the film, writing "once again, we find cinema availing itself of the past to explore the present, and Andò does so expertly, cunningly and with lightness of hand, trusting in Toni Servillo's soberly measured performance and the photographic prowess of his faithful collaborator Maurizio Calvesi". Paolo Mereghetti noted how the film is "a disenchanted reflection on the history of Italy" that "takes on dismantling the traditional rhetoric of leaders’ heroism".
