= Kevin Tod Haug =

Visual effects supervisor

Kevin Tod Haug is a visual effects supervisor who has worked in the film industry since the 1970s. He and Chris Corbould were nominated for the BAFTA Award for Best Special Visual Effects for their work on Quantum of Solace (2008). He was nominated for the Primetime Emmy Award for Outstanding Special Visual Effects for his work on American Gods (2017).

Haug began in the film industry in the 1970s as a motion control programmer. In the 1980s, he became involved with video productions that began using computer-generated effects. In the following decade, he worked on visual effects for television commercials and for two music videos directed by Mark Romanek. Haug's first role on a feature film as visual effects supervisor came with The Game when one of its producers, Ceán Chaffin who had worked with him on previous commercial and video projects, hired him. Haug was active as a visual effects supervisor from 1997 through 2003 before he decided to do visual effects work on more modest projects for independent film directors. He worked as visual effects designer for Marc Forster on the 2004 film Finding Neverland. Haug said the position was similar to production designer in how it had greater involvement earlier in a film's production rather than just at the end. Haug was also one of the founders of the production service FX Cartel.

== Credits ==
=== Film ===
- The Game (1997) – visual effects supervisor
- Fight Club (1999) – visual effects supervisor
- The Cell (2000) – visual effects supervisor
- Panic Room (2002) – visual effects supervisor
- A Wrinkle in Time (2003) – visual effects supervisor
- Finding Neverland (2004) – visual effects designer
- Stay (2005) – visual effects designer
- Stranger than Fiction (2006) – visual effects designer
- The Kite Runner (2007) – visual effects designer
- Mr. Magorium's Wonder Emporium (2007) – visual effects designer
- Quantum of Solace (2008) – visual effects designer
- The Twilight Saga: Eclipse (2010) – visual effects supervisor
- Conan the Barbarian (2011) – visual effects shoot supervisor
- Machine Gun Preacher (2011) – visual effects designer
- The Time Being (2012) – visual effects designer
- Kingsman: The Secret Service (2014) – visual effects supervisor (HEM sequence)
- Last Call (2017) – visual effects designer
- Fallen (2016) – VFX unit director
- Nightmare Cinema ("This Way to Egress" segment) (2019) – visual effects designer
- Comandante (2023) – visual effects designer

=== Television ===
- Eerie, Indiana (1991–1992) – visual effects supervisor
- American Gods (2017–present) – visual effects designer
- Nightflyers (2018) – visual effects designer, one episode
- Barkskins (2020) – visual effects designer, three episodes
