= Comandante (2023 film) =

2023 Italian drama film

- Theatrical release poster
- Directed by: Edoardo De Angelis
- Written by: Edoardo De Angelis; Sandro Veronesi
- Produced by: Edoardo De Angelis; Attilio De Razza; Nicola Giuliano; Pierpaolo Verga
- Starring: Pierfrancesco Favino
- Cinematography: Ferran Paredes Rubio
- Edited by: Lorenzo Peluso
- Music by: Robert Del Naja; Euan Dickinson
- Production companies: Indigo Film; O' Groove; Rai Cinema; Tramp Ltd.; V-Groove; Wise Pictures
- Distributed by: 01 Distribution
- Release date: 30 August 2023 (Venice)
- Running time: 120 minutes
- Country: Italy
- Box office: $3.8 million

Comandante is a 2023 Italian war drama film co-written and directed by Edoardo De Angelis and starring Pierfrancesco Favino. The film tells an episode of the Battle of the Atlantic, when the Italian submarine Comandante Cappellini sank the Belgian ship Kabalo, and Cappellini's commander Salvatore Todaro (Favino) decided to disobey orders and to rescue the Kabalo's crew, being forced to navigate on the surface for three days, making the ship an easy target for enemies. The film opened the 80th Venice Film Festival on 30 August 2023.

== Plot ==
During World War II, Salvatore Todaro, a commander in the Royal Italian Navy, is in charge of the newly commissioned submarine Cappellini. Despite suffering from back injuries that had led to his medical retirement after an accident, the officer refuses to retreat to a quiet life, much to the dismay of his wife. Todaro equips each of his men with a dagger for potential close combat and is always ready to face any battle on the open seas.

On 16 October 1940, off the Atlantic coast, Todaro orders an attack on the Belgian steamer Kabalo, which had opened fire on the Italian submarine. After sinking the enemy vessel, the Italian commander makes an unorthodox decision: against his superiors' orders, he rescues 26 Belgian survivors stranded on lifeboats hundreds of miles from the nearest coast. This act of humanity comes at great risk, as the submarine must travel surfaced for several days, exposing itself to enemy forces. With limited space onboard, some survivors are forced to remain on top of the submarine, endangering both themselves and the crew. Todaro, however, is determined to deliver the survivors to the neutral shores of Santa Maria in the Azores.

Over the two-day journey, the Cappellini becomes an unexpected space of camaraderie between strangers who, despite their differences, discover they are more alike than they initially thought. Friendships are forged, cultural customs are exchanged, and the Belgian survivor Reclercq even teaches the submarine’s cook how to make French fries. The only disruption comes from two survivors who rebel against their Italian hosts, causing minor damage to the submarine before being subdued.

At one point, Todaro encounters British warships. Risking everything, he signals his peaceful intentions and successfully negotiates a ceasefire. Justifying his actions by claiming he rescued the survivors "because we are Italians," Todaro safely delivers them to their destination. Some of the survivors would later visit Todaro’s widow after the war to pay their respects. Tragically, Commander Todaro would lose his life on 14 December 1942, killed by British machine-gun fire.

== Cast ==
- Pierfrancesco Favino as Salvatore Todaro
- Johan Heldenbergh as Georges Vogels
- Silvia D'Amico as Rina Todaro
- Paolo Bonacelli as Betti
- Massimiliano Rossi as Vittorio Marcon
- Arturo Muselli as Danilo Stiepovich
- Giuseppe Brunetti as Gigino Magnifico
- Gianluca Di Gennaro as Vincenzo Stumpo
- Johannes Wirix-Speetjens as Jacques Reclercq
- Cecilia Bertozzi as Anna
- Pietro Angelini as Ivano Leandri
- Mario Russo as Salvatore Minniti
- Giustiniano Alpi as Morandi
- Luca Chikovani as Leonardo Barletta
- Giorgio Cantarini as Vezio Schiassi
- Andrea Ferrara as Antonio Mulargia
- Lucas Tavernier as Caudron
- Danilo Arena as Nicolò Poma

== Production ==
=== Development ===
Director Edoardo De Angelis became interested in the story following a speech delivered in 2018 by Admiral Giovanni Pettorino during the 153rd anniversary of the Italian Coast Guard, in which Pettorino referenced Todaro as an example in contrast to the policies of the Conte I Government towards NGOs and the European migrant crisis. The film had a budget of €14.5 million. Additionally, it received full support from the Italian Navy, which provided the production team with access to its archives and the Cappellini’s logbook for enhanced authenticity. The director stated, "Cinema often tells defamatory or hagiographic stories [...] we worked with a clear and honest intention."

=== Cappellini replica ===
Production designer Carmine Guarino faced challenges in creating a full-scale replica of the submarine featured in the film due to the lack of schematics and interior photographs of Italian submarines from that era. After creating a 3D model, Guarino collaborated with mechanical engineer Nicola Ferrari, who designed a "strut system" to make the submarine float in the Ferrati Naval Basin of the Taranto Naval Arsenal and then allowed it to navigate at sea. The interiors were reconstructed at Cinecittà World, using the replica of a U-Boat built for the film U-571 (2000) as a base. Meanwhile, the submarine's hull was built directly in Taranto over eight months.

In total, the Cappellini replica weighed over 70 tons and measured 73 meters in length. Its construction involved over 100 engineers, builders, and artisans, with support from the Italian Navy’s historical office, the staff of the Historical Exhibition of the Arsenal, and Fincantieri.

=== Filming ===
Filming began on 5 September 2022 in Taranto, at the Naval Arsenal of the Italian Navy, and continued there for eight weeks on the waters of the Mar Piccolo. Four days of underwater filming were then conducted in Belgium.

=== Visual effects ===
The film’s visual effects accounted for 10% of the production budget. Several international companies worked on them, under the supervision of American expert Kevin Tod Haug.

== Historical accuracy ==
The first mission of the submarine Cappellini, under the command of Todaro, began on 29 September 1940. During the mission, the second officer played the submariners' anthem over the submarine's intercom system, but this anthem was actually created in 1941 following a competition organized by the Opera Nazionale del Dopolavoro. Therefore, the anthem could not have been played in 1940.

== Related projects ==
Based on their screenplay, Veronesi and De Angelis wrote the novelization of the film, also titled Comandante, which was published by Bompiani on 25 January 2023.

== Release ==
The film was selected as the opening film at the 80th Venice International Film Festival on 30 August 2023, replacing originally announced Challengers due to the ongoing 2023 SAG-AFTRA strike. It was theatrically released in Italy on 1 November 2023 by 01 Distribution (or 31 October as written in the promotional poster above).

== Reception ==
=== Box office ===
Comandante grossed $3.8 million in Italy.

=== Critical response ===
On the review aggregator website Rotten Tomatoes, 41% of 17 critics' reviews are positive. Metacritic, which uses a weighted average, assigned the film a score of 43 out of 100, based on six critics, indicating "mixed or average" reviews.

== Awards ==
- 2024 - David di Donatello
  - Nomination for Best Actor – Pierfrancesco Favino
  - Nomination for Best Producer – Nicola Giuliano, Francesca Cima, Carlotta Calori, Viola Prestieri for Indigo Film; Pierpaolo Verga, Edoardo De Angelis for O' Groove; Paolo Del Brocco for Rai Cinema; Attilio De Razza for Tramp Limited; Mariagiovanna De Angelis for Vgroove; Antonio Miyakawa for Wise Pictures
  - Nomination for Best Cinematography – Ferran Paredes Rubio
  - Nomination for Best Production Design – Carmine Guarino and Iole Autero
  - Nomination for Best Costume Design – Massimo Cantini Parrini
  - Nomination for Best Makeup – Paola Gattabrusi and Lorenzo Tamburini
  - Nomination for Best Hairstyling – Massimo Gattabrusi
  - Nomination for Best Sound – Valentino Gianni, Alessandro Feletti, Mirko Perri, and Giancarlo Rutigliano
  - Nomination for Best Visual Effects – Kevin Tod Haug and Stacey Dodge
  - Nomination for the David Giovani Award
- 2024 - Nastro d'Argento
  - Nomination for Best Film
  - Nomination for Best Actor (Pierfrancesco Favino)
  - Nomination for Best Cinematography (Ferran Paredes Rubio)
  - Nomination for Best Production Design (Carmine Guarino)
  - Nomination for Best Sound (Valentino Gianni)
  - Nomination for Best Casting Director (Gabriella Giannattasio and Marco Matteo Donat-Cattin)
- 2023 - Venice Film Festival
  - In competition for the Golden Lion
