= Matteo Garrone =

Italian film director and screenwriter

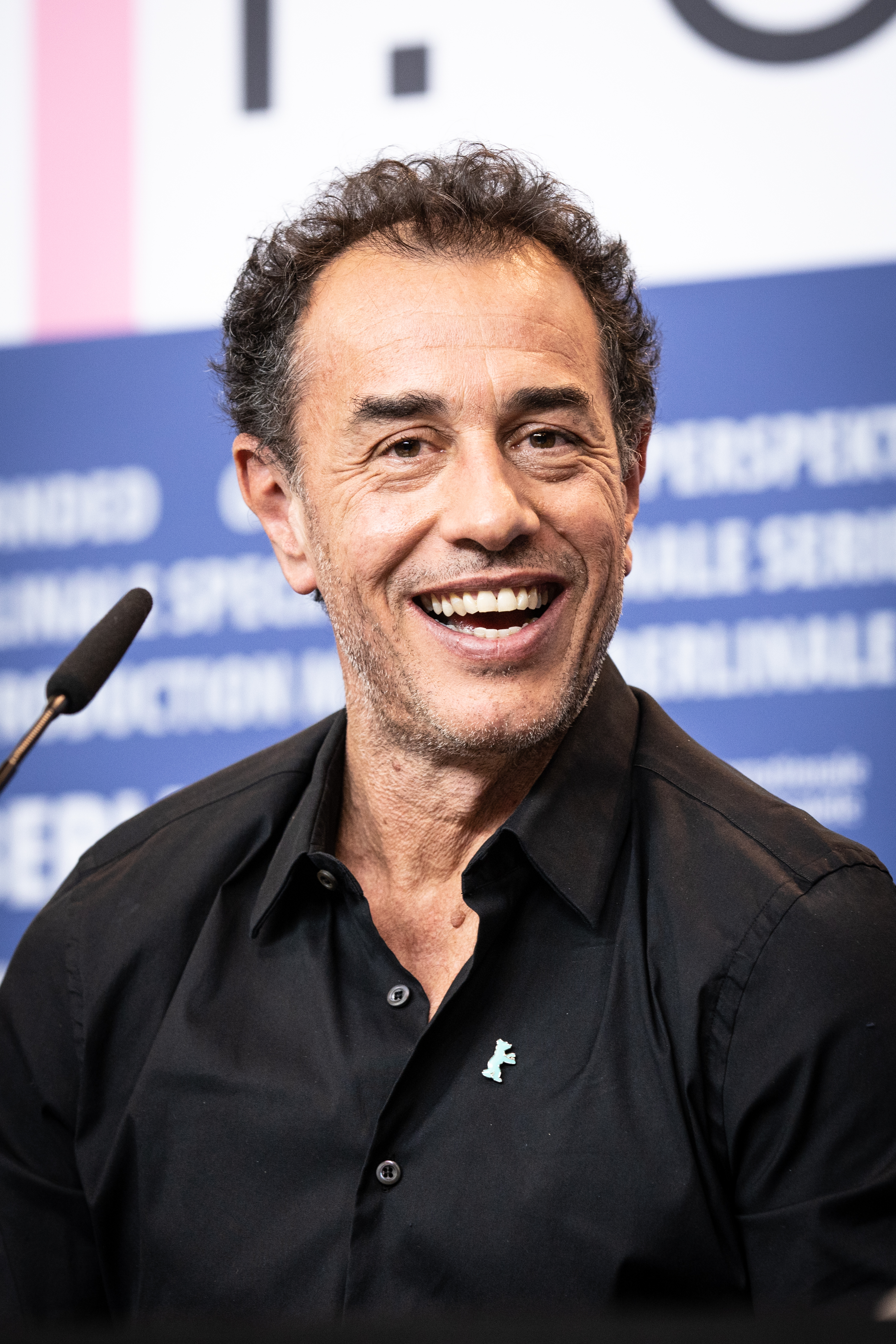
- Garrone at the Berlin Film Festival 2020
- Born: October 15, 1968 (age 57); Rome, Italy
- Education: Liceo Artistico Ripetta
- Occupations: Film director; screenwriter; producer
- Known for: Gomorrah, Tale of Tales, Dogman, Io capitano
- Relatives: Adriano Rimoldi (grandfather)
- Website: www.matteogarrone.eu

Matteo Garrone (born October 15, 1968) is an Italian filmmaker. His notable works include Gomorrah (2008), Reality (2012), Tale of Tales (2015), Dogman (2018), Pinocchio (2019) and Io capitano (2023). He is a ten-time David di Donatello Award (3 for Best Film, 4 for Best Director, 3 for Best Screenplay) and three-time Nastro d'Argento Award winner, among other accolades.

== Early life and education ==
Matteo Garrone was born in Rome, Italy, the son of a theatre critic, Nico Garrone and a photographer, Donatella Rimoldi. His maternal grandfather is actor Adriano Rimoldi. He is graduate of Liceo Artistico Ripetta.

== Career ==
In 1996 Garrone won the Sacher d'Oro, an award sponsored by Nanni Moretti, with the short film Silhouette, that became one of the three episodes that are on his first long feature, Terra di Mezzo in 1997.

Garrone won the European Film Award for Best Director and the David di Donatello for Best Director for Gomorrah (2008). His film Reality (2012) won the Grand Prix at the 2012 Cannes Film Festival.

His films Tale of Tales (2015) and Dogman (2018) were selected to compete for the Palme d'Or at the 2015 Cannes Film Festival and the 2018 Cannes Film Festival respectively. The Nastro d'Argento awarded Garrone both Best Producer and Best Director for Dogman. He received the latter again for Pinocchio (2019).

In 2019, Garrone was invited to become a member of the Academy of Motion Picture Arts and Sciences. In 2024, his film Io capitano (2023) was nominated for the Academy Award for Best International Feature Film at the 96th Academy Awards, representing Italy.

== Filmography ==
=== Director ===
==== Short films ====
- Silhouette (1996)
- Bienvenido espirito santo (1997)
- Un caso di forza maggiore (1997)
- Oreste Pipolo, fotografo di matrimoni (1998)
- Before Design: Classic (2016)
- Delightful (2017)
- Entering Red (2019)
- Le mythe Dior (2020)
- The Tarot Deck (Le château du tarot) (2021)

==== Feature films ====
- 1996 – Terra di mezzo
- 1998 – Guests (Ospiti)
- 2000 – Roman Summer (Estate romana)
- 2002 – The Embalmer (L'imbalsamatore)
- 2003 – First Love (Primo amore)
- 2008 – Gomorrah (Gomorra)
- 2012 – Reality
- 2015 – Tale of Tales (Il racconto dei racconti)
- 2018 – Dogman
- 2019 – Pinocchio
- 2023 – Io capitano

=== Producer ===
- Silhouette (1996)
- Terra di mezzo (1996)
- Ospiti (1998)
- Estate romana (2000)
- Mid-August Lunch (2008)

== Awards and nominations ==
| Award | Year | Category | Film | Result | Ref. |
|---|---|---|---|---|---|
| Academy Awards | 2024 | Best International Feature Film (representing Italy) | Io capitano | Nominated | |
| BAFTA Film Awards | 2009 | Best Film Not in the English Language | Gomorrah | Nominated | |
| BAFTA Film Awards | 2019 | Best Film Not in the English Language | Dogman | Nominated | |
| British Independent Film Awards | 2008 | Best Foreign Independent Film | Gomorrah | Nominated | |
| Cannes Film Festival | 2008 | Grand Prix | Gomorrah | Won | |
| Cannes Film Festival | 2012 | Grand Prix | Reality | Won | |
| Capri Hollywood International Film Festival | 2023 | Humanitarian Award | Io capitano | Won | |
| César Awards | 2009 | Best Foreign Film | Gomorrah | Nominated | |
| David di Donatello | 2019 | Best Film | Dogman | Won | |
| David di Donatello | 2019 | Best Director | Dogman | Won | |
| David di Donatello | 2019 | Best Original Screenplay | Dogman | Won | |
| David di Donatello | 2020 | Best Film | Pinocchio | Nominated | |
| David di Donatello | 2020 | Best Director | Pinocchio | Nominated | |
| David di Donatello | 2020 | Best Adapted Screenplay | Pinocchio | Nominated | |
| David di Donatello | 2024 | Best Film | Io capitano | Won | |
| David di Donatello | 2024 | Best Director | Io capitano | Won | |
| David di Donatello | 2024 | Best Original Screenplay | Io capitano | Nominated | |
| European Film Awards | 2008 | European Director | Gomorrah | Won | |
| European Film Awards | 2008 | European Screenwriter | Gomorrah | Won | |
| European Film Awards | 2018 | European Film | Dogman | Nominated | |
| European Film Awards | 2018 | European Director | Dogman | Nominated | |
| European Film Awards | 2018 | European Screenwriter | Dogman | Nominated | |
| European Film Awards | 2023 | European Film | Io capitano | Nominated | |
| European Film Awards | 2023 | European Director | Io capitano | Nominated | |
| Golden Globe Awards | 2009 | Best Motion Picture – Non-English Language | Gomorrah | Nominated | |
| Golden Globe Awards | 2024 | Best Motion Picture – Non-English Language | Io capitano | Nominated | |
| Independent Spirit Awards | 2009 | Best Foreign Film | Gomorrah | Nominated | |
| Nastro d'Argento | 2018 | Best Director | Dogman | Won | |
| Nastro d'Argento | 2020 | Best Director | Pinocchio | Won | |
| Polish Film Award | 2019 | Best European Film | Dogman | Nominated | |
| Venice Film Festival | 2023 | Silver Lion | Io capitano | Won | |

== Collaborators ==
Garrone likes to work with the same team of filmmakers, often hiring cast and crew from his previous films. Regular members of the 'team' include:

| Collaborators | Terra di mezzo | Guests | Roman Summer | The Embalmer | First Love | Gomorrah | Reality | Tale of Tales | Dogman | Pinocchio | I'm capitan |
|---|---|---|---|---|---|---|---|---|---|---|---|
| Marco Onorato (Cinematographer) | check | check | | check | check | check | check | | | | |
| Marco Spoletini (Editor) | check | check | check | check | check | check | check | check | check | check | check |
| Domenico Procacci (Producer) | | | | check | check | check | check | | | | |
| Jean Labadie (Producer) | | | | | | | check | check | check | check | |
| Jeremy Thomas (Producer) | | | | | | | | check | check | check | |
| Paolo Bonfini (Production designer) | | | check | check | check | check | check | | | | |
| Dimitri Capuani (Production designer) | | | | | | | | check | check | check | check |
| Massimo Cantini Parrini (Costume designer) | | | | | | | | check | check | check | |
| Banda Osiris (Composer) | | | check | check | check | | | | | | |
| Alexandre Desplat (Composer) | | | | | | | check | check | | | |
| Massimo Gaudioso (co-writer) | | | check | check | check | check | check | check | check | | check |
| Ugo Chiti (co-writer) | | | | check | | check | check | check | check | | |
| Maricetta Lombardo (Sound) | | | check | check | check | check | check | check | check | check | check |
| Ciro Petrone (actor) | | | | | | check | check | | | check | |

== Bibliography ==
- Luciana d'Arcangeli, ‘Fatalmente tua: Garrone, il noir e le donne’, in the special issue “An Eye on Italy” on Italian Cinema of the e-journal Flinders University Languages Group Online Review – FULGOR, Volume 5, Issue 3, June 2018, pp. 14–26 - https://www.fulgor.online/vol5-issue3-2018-forthcoming
- Luciana d'Arcangeli. "The Films of Matteo Garrone: Italian Cinema Is Not Embalmed" in William Hope (ed) "Italian Film Directors in the New Millennium". Cambridge, Cambridge Scholars Press, 2010, pp. 175–187.
- Pierpaolo De Sanctis, Domenico Monetti, Luca Pallanch. "Non solo Gomorra. Tutto il cinema di Matteo Garrone", Rome, Edizioni Sabinae, 2008.
