= Massimo Gaudioso =

Italian screenwriter and director (born 1958)

- Born: 18 February 1958 (age 68); Naples, Italy
- Occupations: Screenwriter; Film director

Massimo Gaudioso (born 18 February 1958) is an Italian screenwriter, film director, and occasional actor, best known for his professional association with Matteo Garrone.

== Life and career ==
Born in Naples, Gaudioso graduated in business administration at the Federico II University and then worked in an advertising agency. Between 1983 and 1995 he worked as a freelance screenwriter and director, making among other things commercials, industrial films, institutional videos and short documentaries.

Gaudioso made his feature film debut in 1996, co-writing, co-directing and co-producing with Eugenio Cappuccio and Fabio Nunziata the semi-autobiographical film Il caricatore, based on the short with the same name the trio had written and directed one year before; the film won several awards, including the award for best screenplay at the Torino Film Festival and the Ciak d'oro for best first work. Following another film with Cappuccio and Nunziata (La vita è una sola, 1999), Gaudioso focused on screenwriting, starting in 2000 a long professional association with Matteo Garrone; other notable collaborations include Carlo Verdone, Daniele Vicari, Gianni Di Gregorio, and Luca Miniero.

During his career Gaudioso received numerous awards, notably the European Film Award for Best Screenwriter for Garrone's Gomorrah, four David di Donatellos and two Silver Ribbons.

== Selected filmography ==
- Il caricatore (1996, also co-director)
- La vita è una sola (1999, also co-director)
- Roman Summer (2000)
- The Embalmer (2002)
- First Love (2004)
- One Out of Two (2006)
- The Past Is a Foreign Land (2008)
- Gomorrah (2008)
- The Seed of Discord (2008)
- Mid-August Lunch (2008)
- Benvenuti al Sud (2010)
- Tatanka (2011)
- Reality (2012)
- The Ideal City (2012)
- It Was the Son (2012)
- La scuola più bella del mondo (2014)
- Tale of Tales (2015)
- Un paese quasi perfetto (2016, also director)
- The Big Score (2016)
- Rafaël (2018)
- Dogman (2018)
- 18 Presents (2020)
- The Catholic School (2021)
- Strangeness (2022)
- Io capitano (2023)
- Hey Joe (2024)
- The Illusion (2025)
