= Salvatore Todaro (naval officer) =

Italian naval officer (1908–1942)

- Born: 16 September 1908; Messina, Kingdom of Italy
- Died: 13 December 1942 (aged 34); La Galite, Tunisia
- Military career
- Allegiance: Kingdom of Italy
- Branch: Regia Marina
- Service years: 1923–1942
- Rank: Lieutenant commander
- Commands: H 4 (submarine); Macallè (submarine); Jalea (submarine); Luciano Manara (submarine); Comandante Cappellini (submarine)
- Conflicts: Spanish Civil War; World War II; Battle of the Atlantic; Siege of Sevastopol; Battle of the Mediterranean
- Awards: Gold Medal of Military Valor (posthumous); Silver Medal of Military Valor (three times); Bronze Medal of Military Valor (twice); Iron Cross

Salvatore Bruno Todaro (16 September 1908 – 14 December 1942) was an Italian naval officer and submariner during World War II. He is best known for his participation in the battle of the Atlantic and the two instances in which he towed to safety the lifeboats carrying the survivors of ships he had sunk.

== Biography ==
=== Early life and career ===
Todaro was born in Messina, Sicily, but grew up in Chioggia. He entered the Naval Academy of Livorno on October 18, 1923, and graduated with the rank of ensign in 1927. On the following year he was promoted to lieutenant and sent to Taranto to attend the aerial observation course. He was then assigned to the headquarters of the Ionian and Southern Adriatic Naval Department in Taranto in 1931, and on the heavy cruiser Trieste on the following year.

In 1933 he married in Livorno Rina Anichini, with whom he had two children, Gian Luigi (born in 1939) and Graziella Marina (born after his death in 1943). On April 27, 1933, Todaro was involved in a plane crash aboard a Savoia-Marchetti S.55 flying boat of the 187th Squadron, on which he was embarked as an observer; the floatplane crashed into the sea after dropping a torpedo, and Todaro suffered a spinal fracture that would force him to wear a corset for the rest of his life.

After serving at the Regia Aeronautica command of the Northern Tyrrhenian Sea, he returned to the ranks of the Regia Marina from 1 October 1934. From 4 October 1935 Todaro was assigned to the 146th Seaplane Squadron of the Air Force of Sardinia, and on the following year he became executive officer on the submarines Marcantonio Colonna (from 27 April to 14 December 1936) and Des Geneys (from 14 December 1936). On 22 May 1937 he obtained his first command, the small coastal submarine H 4, participating in the Spanish Civil War with patrols against Republican shipping; he then commanded Macallè in 1938-39 and Jalea in 1939-40.

On 27 April 1940 he assumed command of the submarine Luciano Manara; on 1 July 1940, twenty days after Italy's entry into World War II, he was promoted to lieutenant commander, and on September 26 he was given command of the brand new ocean-going submarine Comandante Cappellini. Soon after completion, Cappellini was transferred to the new base of Betasom, in Bordeaux, to participate in the Battle of the Atlantic.

=== Battle of the Atlantic ===
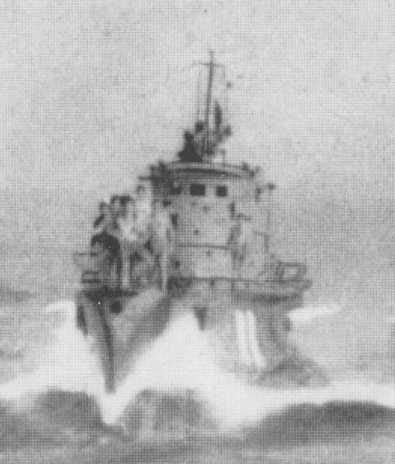
Comandante Cappellini, commanded by Todaro during the battle of the Atlantic.

On the night of 16 October 1940, during its first Atlantic patrol off the island of Madeira, Cappellini sighted the Belgian steamer Kabalo (5,186 tons), carrying aircraft spare parts, and after unsuccessfully firing three torpedoes, sank her with its deck gun. Afterwards, the submarine approached a lifeboat containing twenty-six survivors and towed it for four days towards the Azores; when the boat started sinking after being damaged by the heavy seas, on the fourth day, Todaro had the survivors taken aboard his submarine and proceeded to Salt Island, where they were safely landed in neutral territory. To a Belgian officer who expressed his surprise for his sinker's humanitarian initiative, Todaro replied "I am a seaman like you. I am convinced that in my place you would have done the same".

On 22 December 1940 Todaro sailed from Bordeaux for another patrol in command of Cappellini. On 5 January 1941, in the stretch of ocean between the Canary Islands and the African coast, Cappellini attacked the 5,029-ton British armed steamship Shakespear, sinking her after a prolonged gun duel in which an Italian gunner was killed. Afterwards, Todaro once again took a lifeboat with twenty-two survivors in tow, towing them to the Islands of Cape Verde where they safely landed. Cappellini then resumed its patrol and on 14 January it attacked the 7,472-ton British armed merchant Eumaeus off Freetown; after the unsuccessful launch of two torpedoes and a prolonged gun battle in which nine Italian gunners were wounded and Cappellini's executive officer, Lieutenant Danilo Stiepovich, was killed, Eumaeus was sunk. Soon afterwards, Cappellini was attacked and damaged by a Supermarine Walrus floatplane. The damage forced Todaro to seek refuge in Puerto de La Luz on Gran Canaria; after hasty repairs that lasted three days, Cappellini sailed again on 23 January 1941 and returned to Bordeaux. For this patrol, Todaro was awarded a Silver Medal of Military Valor.

Todaro later carried out two more Atlantic patrols with Cappellini, but scored no further success.

The events of the patrol are fictionalized in the 2023 Italian film Comandante, starring Pierfrancesco Favino as Todaro.

=== MAS service and death ===
In November 1941 Todaro was transferred at his own request to the MAS service, being assigned to the Quarta Flottiglia MAS, stationed in the Black Sea; he distinguished himself during the siege of Sevastopol, being awarded another Silver Medal of Military Valor.

He was then transferred to the Decima Flottiglia MAS, the special operations unit of the Royal Italian Navy, and tasked with planning and conducting assault craft attacks on Allied-controlled ports in French North Africa after Operation Torch. On 13 December 1942, while returning from one such operation, he was killed in his sleep when the armed trawler Cefalo, used as mothership for assault craft, was strafed by a Supermarine Spitfire off La Galite. He was posthumously awarded the Gold Medal of Military Valor; a class of submarines of the postwar Italian Navy has been named after him.
