= Michele Riondino =

Italian actor (born 1979)

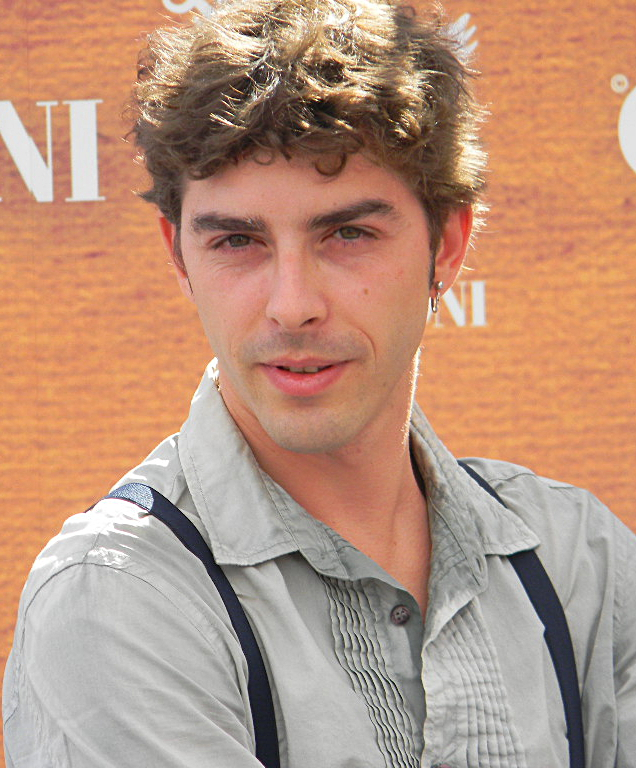
- Born: 14 March 1979 (age 47); Taranto, Apulia, Italy
- Occupation: Actor

Michele Riondino (born 14 March 1979) is an Italian actor.

Born in Taranto, Riondino enrolled at the Silvio D'Amico National Academy of Dramatic Art, graduating in 2000. In 2006, he acted in The Black Arrow, a TV series broadcast by Canale 5, directed by Fabrizio Costa.

His acting breakthrough came in 2008, with The Past Is a Foreign Land, for which he was awarded best actor at the Rome Film Festival and at the Miami International Film Festival.

In 2010 Riondino was appointed EFP Shooting Star at the Berlin International Film Festival. He received the Guglielmo Biraghi Award at the 67th Venice International Film Festival. He played the title character in the RAI TV-series The Young Montalbano from 2012 - 2015.

== Filmography ==
=== Film ===
Year	Title	Role	Notes
2003	Uomini & donne, amori & bugie	Emanuele	
2008	The Past Is a Foreign Land	Francesco Cardiucci	
2009	Fort Apache Napoli	Rico	
2009	Ten Winters	Silvestro	
2009	Little Sea	Tonio	
2010	We Believed	Salvatore Tambasco	
2011	Henry	Gianni	
2011	Qualche nuvola	Father Franco	
2011	Drifters	Damiano	
2012	Steel	Alessio	
2012	Dormant Beauty	Roberto	
2014	Leopardi	Antonio Ranieri	
2015	Wondrous Boccaccio	Guiscardo	
2016	Senza lasciare traccia	Bruno	
2016	Worldly Girl	Libero	
2017	Diva!	Giorgio Strehler	
2017	Falchi	Francesco	
2018	Restiamo amici	Alessandro Colonna	
2019	Un'avventura	Matteo	
2021	I nostri fantasmi	Valerio	
2023	Wish	King Magnifico	Italian dub; voice role
2023	Palazzina Laf	Caterino Lamanna	Also writer and director
2025	The Holy Boy	Sergio Rossetti	
2025	Primavera	Antonio Vivaldi	

=== Television ===
Year	Title	Role	Notes
2001	Compagni di scuola	Alessio	Main role
2001	Casa famiglia	Cristoforo	Episode: "L'adozione"
2002	Incantesimo	Enrico	2 episodes
2003–2005	Distretto di Polizia	Daniele Fanelli	3 episodes
2006	La freccia nera	Tazio	Main role
2006	Giorni da leone	Alessandro's friend	Episode: "Seconda puntata"
2011	Il segreto dell'acqua	Blasco Santocastro	Main role
2012–2015	The Young Montalbano	Salvo Montalbano	Lead role
2015	Pietro Mennea: La freccia del sud	Pietro Mennea	Television film
2018	La mossa del cavallo - C'era una volta Vigata	Inspector Giovanni Bovara	Television film
2020	La guerra è finita	Davide Pavia	Lead role
2022	Devotion, a Story of Love and Desire	Carlo Pentecoste	Lead role
2023	The Lions of Sicily	Vincenzo Florio	Lead role
2025	The Count of Monte Cristo	Jacopo	Main role
