= Marco Spoletini =

Italian film editor (born 1964)

Marco Spoletini (born 1964) is an Italian film editor.

Born in Rome, Spoletini graduated from the Istituto di Stato per la Cinematografia Roberto Rossellini, then he enrolled at the Centro Sperimentale di Cinematografia, where he studied film editing under Roberto Perpignani. He is well known for his association with Matteo Garrone, with whom he worked since his first short film.

In 2003 Spoletini won the Silver Ribbon and the Ciak d'oro for his work in the films The Embalmer and Maximum Velocity (V-Max). In 2009 he won the David di Donatello for Garrone's Gomorrah.
