= Mario Gianani =

Italian producer (born 1969 or 1970)

- Born: 1969 or 1970 (age 56–57); Rome, Italy
- Occupation: Producer
- Years active: 2004–present
- Spouse: Marianna Madia (m. 2013)
- Children: 2

Mario Gianani (born 1969 or 1970) is an Italian film and television producer.

== Biography ==
In 2009, Gianani and Lorenzo Mieli co-founded the production company Wildside; the company was acquired by Fremantle in 2015. In 2024, he left Wildside and co-founded Our Films with Mieli; Mediawan owns a majority stake in the company.

=== Personal life ===
Gianani married Italian politician Marianna Madia in 2013. They have two children.

== Filmography ==
=== Film ===
Year	Title	Director	Notes	Ref.
2004	Private	Saverio Costanzo		
2007	In Memory of Me	Saverio Costanzo		
2009	Vincere	Marco Bellocchio		
2010	The Solitude of Prime Numbers	Saverio Costanzo		
2011	Boris: The Film	Giacomo Ciarrapico, Mattia Torre, Luca Vendruscolo		
2012	Love Is in the Air	Fausto Brizzi		
2012	Me and You	Bernardo Bertolucci		
2012	True Love	Enrico Clerico Nasino		
2013	Pazze di me	Fausto Brizzi		
2013	A Street in Palermo	Emma Dante		
2013	The Mafia Kills Only in Summer	Pif		
2013	Guess Who's Coming for Christmas?	Fausto Brizzi		
2014	Misunderstood	Asia Argento		
2014	Me Romantic Romani	Laura Halilovic		
2014	Hungry Hearts	Saverio Costanzo		
2014	Soap Opera	Alessandro Genovesi		
2014	Ogni maledetto Natale	Giacomo Ciarrapico, Mattia Torre, Luca Vendruscolo		
2015	You Can't Save Yourself Alone	Sergio Castellitto		
2015	La solita commedia: Inferno	Fabrizio Biggio, Francesco Mandelli, Martino Ferro		
2015	God Willing	Edoardo Falcone		
2016	Forever Young	Fausto Brizzi		
2016	At War with Love	Pif		
2016	Poveri ma ricchi	Fausto Brizzi		
2017	Mom or Dad?	Riccardo Milani		
2017	Poveri ma ricchissimi	Fausto Brizzi		
2017	Like a Cat on a Highway	Riccardo Milani		
2018	Tonno spiaggiato	Matteo Martinez		
2019	Don't Stop Me Now	Riccardo Milani		
2019	Pavarotti	Ron Howard	Executive producer	
2019	If Only	Ginevra Elkann		
2019	Cetto c'è, senzadubbiamente	Giulio Manfredonia		
2020	Figli	Giuseppe Bonito		
2020	My Name Is Francesco Totti	Alex Infascelli		
2020	Rifkin's Festival	Woody Allen	Executive producer	
2021	Like a Cat on a Highway 2	Riccardo Milani		
2021	Senza fine	Elisa Fuksas		
2021	On Our Watch	Pif		
2021	7 Women and a Murder	Alessandro Genovesi		
2022	Notre-Dame on Fire	Jean-Jacques Annaud	Executive producer	
2022	The Eight Mountains	Felix van Groeningen, Charlotte Vandermeersch		
2022	L'immensità	Emanuele Crialese		
2022	Amanda	Carolina Cavalli		
2022	Dry	Paolo Virzì		
2023	Thank You Guys	Riccardo Milani		
2023	Patagonia	Simone Bozzelli		
2023	Finally Dawn	Saverio Costanzo		
2023	There's Still Tomorrow	Paola Cortellesi		
2024	Eravamo bambini	Marco Martani		
2024	A World Apart	Riccardo Milani		
2024	Limonov: The Ballad	Kirill Serebrennikov		
2024	Conclave	Edward Berger	Executive producer	
2025	Paternal Leave	Alissa Jung	Executive producer	
2025	Forbidden City	Gabriele Mainetti		
2025	Francesco De Gregori Nevergreen	Stefano Pistolini		
2025	Life Goes This Way	Riccardo Milani		
2026	Feel My Voice	Luca Ribuoli		
2026	Fatherland	Paweł Pawlikowski		
TBA	The Baron in the Trees	Alice Rohrwacher		

=== Television ===
Year	Title	Network	Notes	Ref.
2012	Un Natale con i fiocchi	Sky Cinema 1	Television film	
2013–2016	In Treatment	Sky Cinema 1		
2015	1992	Sky Atlantic, La7		
2016	The Young Pope	Sky Atlantic, HBO, Canal+		
2016–2018	The Mafia Kills Only in Summer	Rai 1		
2017	1993	Sky Atlantic		
2018	Romanzo famigliare	Rai 1		
2018	The Miracle	Sky Atlantic		
2018–2020	The Rats	RaiPlay, Rai 3		
2018–2019	Romolo + Giuly: La guerra mondiale italiana	Fox		
2018–2022	My Brilliant Friend	TIMvision, Rai 1, HBO		
2019	1994	Sky Atlantic		
2019–2020	The New Pope	Sky Atlantic, HBO, Canal+		
2020	We Are Who We Are	HBO, Sky Atlantic		
2021	Speravo de morì prima	Sky Atlantic		
2021	Anna	Sky Atlantic		
2022	Bang Bang Baby	Amazon Prime Video		
2023	The Good Mothers	Disney+		
2023	Everybody Loves Diamonds	Amazon Prime Video		
2025	Portobello	HBO Max		
2026	Before Us	Rai 1		
