= Lorenzo Gangarossa =

Italian producer

- Education: Civica Scuola di Cinema Luchino Visconti; National Film and Television School (MA)
- Occupation: Producer
- Years active: 2006–present

Lorenzo Gangarossa is an Italian film and television producer.

== Biography ==
Gangarossa received a degree in production from the Civica Scuola di Cinema Luchino Visconti and a MA in producing from the National Film and Television School. In 2009, he was appointed the Head of Cinema and TV of Indiana Production. He was later appointed head of international productions of Wildside, a subsidiary of Fremantle. In May 2026, he was appointed head of international projects at Lucky Red.

== Filmography ==
=== Film ===
Year	Title	Director	Notes	Ref.
2013	Human Capital	Paolo Virzì	Executive producer	
2014	Italy in a Day	Gabriele Salvatores		
2015	Un posto sicuro	Francesco Ghiaccio	Delegate producer	
2016	Poveri ma ricchi	Fausto Brizzi		
2017	Poveri ma ricchissimi	Fausto Brizzi		
2018	Isis, Tomorrow. The Lost Souls of Mosul	Francesca Mannocchi, Alessio Romenzi		
2019	Beware the Gorilla	Luca Miniero		
2019	Pavarotti	Ron Howard	Executive producer	
2019	If Only	Ginevra Elkann		
2019	Cetto c'è, senzadubbiamente	Giulio Manfredonia		
2020	Rifkin's Festival	Woody Allen	Executive producer	
2021	Like a Cat on a Highway 2	Riccardo Milani		
2021	Senza fine	Elisa Fuksas		
2021	7 Women and a Murder	Alessandro Genovesi		
2022	Notre-Dame on Fire	Jean-Jacques Annaud	Executive producer	
2022	The Eight Mountains	Felix van Groeningen, Charlotte Vandermeersch		
2022	L'immensità	Emanuele Crialese		
2022	Amanda	Carolina Cavalli		
2022	Dry	Paolo Virzì		
2023	Thank You Guys	Riccardo Milani		
2023	Patagonia	Simone Bozzelli		
2023	Finally Dawn	Saverio Costanzo		
2023	There's Still Tomorrow	Paola Cortellesi		
2024	Eravamo bambini	Marco Martani		
2024	A World Apart	Riccardo Milani		
2024	The Beautiful Game	Thea Sharrock	Executive producer	
2024	Limonov: The Ballad	Kirill Serebrennikov		
2024	Conclave	Edward Berger	Executive producer	
2025	Paternal Leave	Alissa Jung	Executive producer	
2025	Forbidden City	Gabriele Mainetti		
2025	Stolen: Heist of the Century	Mark Lewis	Executive producer	
2025	Life Goes This Way	Riccardo Milani		
2026	Fatherland	Paweł Pawlikowski		
TBA	Let Love In	Felix van Groeningen		

=== Television ===
Year	Title	Network	Notes	Ref.
2018–2020	The Rats	RaiPlay, Rai 3	Delegate producer	
2018–2020	My Brilliant Friend	HBO, Rai 1		
2019	Romolo + Giuly: La guerra mondiale italiana	Fox		
2021	Speravo de morì prima	Sky Atlantic		
2021	Anna	Sky Atlantic		
2023	The Good Mothers	Disney+	Executive producer	
2023	Everybody Loves Diamonds	Amazon Prime Video		
2026	Prima di noi	Rai 1		

== Awards and nominations ==
Award	Year	Category	Nominated work	Result	Ref.
David di Donatello	2023	Best Producer	The Eight Mountains	Nominated	
David di Donatello	2024	Best Producer	There's Still Tomorrow	Nominated	
