= Eravamo bambini =

2023 Italian film by Marco Martani

- Italian theatrical release poster
- Directed by: Marco Martani
- Written by: Massimiliano Bruno; Marco Martani
- Based on: Zero by Massimiliano Bruno
- Produced by: Gianluca Curti; Lorenzo Gangarossa; Mario Gianani; Santo Versace
- Starring: Lorenzo Richelmy; Alessio Lapice; Lucrezia Guidone; Francesco Russo; Giancarlo Commare; Romano Reggiani
- Cinematography: Valerio Azzali
- Edited by: Luciana Pandolfelli
- Music by: Francesco Cerasi
- Production companies: Minerva Pictures; Wildside
- Distributed by: Vision Distribution
- Release dates: 19 October 2023 (Rome); 21 March 2024 (Italy)
- Running time: 100 minutes
- Country: Italy
- Language: Italian

Eravamo bambini (transl. We Were Children) is a 2023 Italian neo-noir drama film directed by Marco Martani, loosely based on the play Zero by Massimiliano Bruno. It premiered at the Rome Film Festival on 19 October 2023.

== Premise ==
A group of friends are traumatized by a brutal event in their childhood. Wanting revenge, they return to the site of the event—a small town in Calabria—to face their demons.

== Cast ==
- Lorenzo Richelmy as Walter
  - Andrea Arru as young Walter
- Alessio Lapice as Gianluca
- Lucrezia Guidone as Margherita
- Francesco Russo as "Cacasotto"
- Giancarlo Commare as Peppino
- Romano Reggiani as Andrea
- Vincenzo Ferrera as Tonino
- Paola Lavini as Elena
- Lucio Patané as Carmine
- Claudia Coli as Maria
- Maria Letizia Gorga as Sinuzza
- Daniele Parisi as Massimo
- Gaetano Sciortino as Angelo
- Francesco Lamantia as Marshal Renzulli
- Massimo Popolizio as Antonio Rizzo

== Production ==
The film was shot in Calabria and Lazio—specifically Latina and Grottaferrata—from late August to October 2022.

== Release ==
The film premiered at the Rome Film Festival on 19 October 2023.
