= Moses Concas =

Moses Concas, pseudonym of Simone Concas (born 15 November 1988), is an Italian musician, harmonica player and composer.

== Biography ==
Born in Iglesias, Sardinia and raised in the province of Cagliari, he discovered his passion for music together with his grandmother. He began his career as a harmonica player in his early twenties, performing as a street artist, with rap and beatbox influences, first in Italy, then in England and in other countries around the world, developing his sound by combining acoustic, electronic and ancestral elements. In 2014 he opened his own production house.

At twenty-eight he won the talent show Italia's Got Talent. He was a finalist at Got Talent All Stars in Spain in 2023 and competed in the edition of America's Got Talent — The Champions. In November 2018 he performed for Pope Francis.

In 2025 he composed the soundtrack for the film La vita va così (Life Goes This Way), directed by Riccardo Milani.

He lives between London and Los Angeles.

== Discography ==
=== Albums ===
- Cannonau Spirits (2016)
- Natural Moses (2016)
- Strays (2017)
- Shardana (2023)

=== Soundtracks ===
- La vita va così (Life Goes This Way), directed by Riccardo Milani (2025)

== Awards ==
- Premio Navicella Sardegna (2019)
- Premio Elisa Nivola (2025)
