= Don't Stop Me Now (film) =

2019 Italian comedy film

- Film poster
- Italian: Ma cosa ci dice il cervello
- Directed by: Riccardo Milani
- Written by: Furio Andreotti; Giulia Calenda; Paola Cortellesi; Riccardo Milani
- Produced by: Lorenzo Mieli
- Starring: Paola Cortellesi
- Cinematography: Saverio Guarna
- Edited by: Patrizia Ceresani; Francesco Renda
- Music by: Andrea Guerra
- Distributed by: Vision Distribution
- Release date: 18 April 2019
- Running time: 100 minutes
- Country: Italy
- Language: Italian

Don't Stop Me Now (Italian: Ma cosa ci dice il cervello, lit. But what does the brain tell us) is a 2019 Italian spy comedy film directed by Riccardo Milani.

== Cast ==
- Paola Cortellesi as Giovanna Salvatori
- Stefano Fresi as Roberto Desideri
- Tomas Arana as Eden Bauen
- Teco Celio as Gerard Colasante
- Remo Girone as D'Alessandro
- Vinicio Marchioni as Marco
- Lucia Mascino as Francesca
- Ricky Memphis as Dario Carocci
- Paola Minaccioni as Anita Ruggiero
- Alessandro Roja as Claudio, the manager
- Giampaolo Morelli as Enrico
- Claudia Pandolfi as Tamara
- Emanuele Armani as Edoardo Grazioli
- Carla Signoris as Agata
- Chiara Luzzi as Martina
- Paolo Antonini as Carrara
- Marco Pancrazi as Iacobelli

== Release ==
Distributed by Vision Distribution, the film was released theatrically in Italy on 18 April 2019.
