= You Can't Save Yourself Alone =

- Directed by: Sergio Castellitto
- Written by: Margaret Mazzantini
- Produced by: Marco Cohen; Fabrizio Donvito; Benedetto Habib; Mario Gianani; Lorenzo Mieli
- Starring: Riccardo Scamarcio; Jasmine Trinca
- Cinematography: Gian Filippo Corticelli
- Music by: Arturo Annecchino
- Production companies: Indiana Production Company; Wildside
- Distributed by: Universal Pictures International
- Release date: 3 May 2015
- Running time: 102 minutes
- Language: Italian

You Can't Save Yourself Alone (Italian: Nessuno si salva da solo) is a 2015 Italian romantic drama film directed by Sergio Castellitto. It is based on a novel with the same name written by Margaret Mazzantini. The film received three nominations at the 2015 David di Donatello Awards, for best actor, best actress and best original song ("'Ellis").

== Plot ==
Gaetano and Delia are a separate couple who find themselves at a restaurant table. With apparent disinterest in each other, they have to discuss the summer holidays of their children Cosmo and Nico, who live with Delia, while Gaetano is staying in a residence.

During the discussion, the two experience several flashbacks that make them understand their past.

The two had met when they were very young: the birth of the children, the first problems, also linked to the conflicting relationships of Delia with her mother and Gaetano with her father, some events that traumatize the children, the voluntary abortion of the third child. At the moment of separation Delia is about to fall into anorexia and her frustration falls on Cosmo, while Gaetano, overwhelmed by too much work, does not take care of the children sufficiently.

When dinner is about to end, two elderly people, Vito and Lea, who have overheard the conversation between Delia and Gaetano, approach. The elderly still seem very much in love and their mutual respect "is tangible". Vito says he is ill with cancer and asks the two young people to pray for him, explaining to them that "nobody saves himself alone".

== Cast ==
- Riccardo Scamarcio as Gaetano
- Jasmine Trinca as Delia
- Roberto Vecchioni as Vito
- Ángela Molina as Lea
- Anna Galiena as Viola
- Eliana Miglio as Serena
- Marina Rocco as Matilde
- Massimo Bonetti as Luigi
- Massimo Ciavarro as Fulvio

== Reception ==
You Can't Save Yourself Alone has an approval rating of 80% on review aggregator website Rotten Tomatoes, based on 5 reviews, and an average rating of 8/10.

== See also ==
- List of Italian films of 2015
