= Petra (TV series) =

Italian television series

- Also known as: Mord in Genua – Ein Fall für Petra Delicato
- Genre: Crime drama; Thriller
- Based on: Ritos de muerte, Día de perros, Mensajeros de la oscuridad, Muertos de papel by Alicia Giménez Bartlett
- Screenplay by: Furio Andreotti; Giulia Calenda; Ilaria Macchia
- Directed by: Maria Sole Tognazzi
- Starring: Paola Cortellesi; Andrea Pennacchi; Diego Ribon; Simone Liberati; Antonio Zavatteri; Riccardo Lombardo; Matteo Sintucci; Alice Acruri; Beatrice Aiello; Nicoletta Robello
- Country of origin: Italy
- Original language: Italian
- No. of seasons: 2
- No. of episodes: 8

Production
- Running time: 84 mins. (per episode)
- Production company: Cattleya

Original release
- Network: Sky Atlantic (s. 1); Sky Serie (s. 2)
- Release: September 14, 2020 – October 12, 2022

Petra (German: Mord in Genua – Ein Fall für Petra Delicato) is an Italian crime drama television series, which premiered on September 14, 2020, on Sky Atlantic. It is based on four detective novels by Spanish writer, Alicia Giménez Bartlett, featuring the character, Petra Delicado. The TV series was directed by Maria Sole Tognazzi. The main protagonist, Petra Delicato (Paola Cortellesi) is an Inspector for the Genoa police, originally working as an archivist. She is assisted by Deputy Inspector Antonio Monte (Andrea Pennacchi). The first season of four episode was broadcast on Sky Italia, and later free-to-air on TV8 from September 14 to October 5, 2020. The second season of another four episodes began on Sky Serie from September 16, 2022. The series was broadcast in Germany as Mord in Genua – Ein Fall für Petra Delicato from December 6, 2020, in Australia via SBS On Demand streaming service, and in the United States on MHz Choice from November 2022.

== Cast ==
- Paola Cortellesi as Petra Delicato, former Rome-based lawyer, Genoan police Inspector in the archive department, called to attend a rape case due to staff shortage, appointed to the homicide squad
- Andrea Pennacchi as Antonio Monte, Deputy Inspector from the fraud squad, called to assist Petra, appointed to the homicide squad
- Diego Ribon as Nicola Ferzicantieri, high-price lawyer, Rome-based, Petra's first husband, dismissive and misogynistic
- Simone Liberati as Lorenzo, chef restaurateur, Petra's second husband, supportive but clingy
- Antonio Zavatteri as Pessone, Homicide Inspector, gives Petra his low profile cases
- Riccardo Lombardo as Salvo Carona, Superintendent, Petra's boss, tries to side-line her whenever cases turn high-profile
- Matteo Sintucci as Matteo Reva, detective, guards Petra
- Alice Acruri as Alba, Petra's housemaid, has a young son, becomes Matteo's love interest
- Beatrice Aiello as Amanda, Petra's younger sister, married to Roberto, mother of Pietro
- Nicoletta Robello as Iacalone, Public Prosecutor

== Guest cast (one episode) ==
- Marina Occhionero as Salomé Frecciani, first rape victim, later murdered
- Federico Tolardo as Mirko, falsely confesses to Salomé's rape
- Iacopo Ricciotti as Alex Mescarelli, food-deliverer, serial rapist and mutilator
- Federica Rosellini as Luisa Sangenini, hardware store clerk, Alex' cousin/half-sister, lies about Alex
- Orietta Notari as Carla, Alex' mother, Luisa's aunt, lies about Alex and her ex-husband, Riccardo
- Alessia Giuliani as Valentina, dog trainer, owns a molossus dog Vulcano, Antonio's love interest
- Alessandro Tedeschi as Luca, vet, brief fling with Petra
- Andrea Bruschi as Ciro Toleta, dog breeder, organises dog fighting
- ? as Grazia Toleta, dog breeder-trainer, Ciro's wife, helps with dog fighting, owns a guard dog Zoa,
- Andrei Nova as Christian / Diddyim Ivanov, hotel construction foreman, Skoptsy Russian cult member
- Cristian Popa as Egor Zuratov, Moscow homicide detective, brief fling with Petra
- Marco Quaglia as Giovanni Imbreccia, journalist-editor of La Veglia, a Rome-based Catholic newspaper, highly influential client of Nicola
- Fabio Morici as restaurant manager, witness recants his evidence
- Claudio Vanni as Mauro, police informer, convicted rapist
- Gianluca Tricarico as Dario, TV gossip monger, host of Linea Gossip, shot dead
- ? as Giorgia Baroi, sex worker, strangled and dumped in beach off Genoa
- Fabrizio Traversa as Simone, Rome-based sex worker, friend of Giorgia
- Federico Fazioli as Oreste di Monaldo, business man accused of money laundering

== Distribution ==
The first season of Petra consisting of four episodes was broadcast simultaneously on Sky Cinema, Sky Atlantic and streaming on Now TV, and later free-to-air on TV8, from September 14 to October 5, 2020. In March 2021, filming began on the second season which premiered on Sky from September 16, 2022 for Sky Extra customers, while normal programming takes place from September 21, 2022 on Sky Cinema Uno, Sky Serie and Now TV.

== Episode guide ==
=== Season one ===
No.	Title	Directed by	Written by	Based on	Original release date
1	"Death Rites"	Maria Sole Tognazzi	Furio Andreotti, Giulia Calenda, Ilaria Macchia	Ritos de muerte	September 14, 2020
Petra and Antonio investigate three linked rapes: Salomé, Domenica and Cristina. Each branded with an M-shaped cut made by a metallic device, which left rhodium traces. By aligning the cuts, Petra determines its shape: a compass rose. Mirko falsely confesses to Salomé's rape but is humiliated by a disbelieving Petra. A jeweller, Roberto, describes the buyer: he has a discoloured tooth. He left an email address. At home, Petra discusses the case with Antonio; Lorenzo arrives and provides a meal. Police track the email address to an Internet café. Nearby Petra walks into a young food-deliverer, Alex, with a discoloured tooth: he knocks her down. His mother, Carla, claims not to know his whereabouts and that his father, Ricardo died. Ricardo ran off with her sister and they had Luisa. Luisa, who lives with Carla, also denies contact. Petra and Antonio meet Nicola and his fiancée. Nicola demeans Petra's career but Antonio defends her. Alex is found dead: suspicion is cast on Salomé. Antonio finds Alex father, Ricardo living nearby: he had hidden Alex. Salomé is raped again, another cut and then murdered. Petra tracks down Luisa, who has Alex' compass rose device. She killed both Alex and Salomé.
2	"Dog Day"	Maria Sole Tognazzi	Furio Andreotti, Giulia Calenda, Ilaria Macchia	Día de perros	September 21, 2020
Petra investigates the murder of dog breeder, Vincenzo. His pet dog, Fright, is treated by a vet, Luca. Police find two of Vincenzo's notebooks, which use a hidden code, one notebook is missing. Fright leads them from Vincenzo's dump site to a training kennel, run by Valentina. Luca suggests that Vincenzo previously sold dogs for vivisection. Police interview Vincenzo's former business partner, Angelo, they split when vivisection was banned. Vincenzo went on to selling stolen pedigree dogs. Some were used for dog fighting. Valentina owns Vulcano. Petra and Antonio interview Ciro and Grazia, they own Zoa. Police raid a dog fight venue but the owners, dogs and punters had all left. Valentina is found mutilated to death by a dog, suspicion first falls on Vulcano. Forensics find Vincenzo's missing third notebook and evidence of another dog. Antonio is excluded from further investigation. Police use Vincenzo's notebook to find the next dog fight, while listening they hear Antonio argue with Ciro. Police raid the venue to make arrests. Ciro was Valentina's lover, so Grazia set Zoa to kill Valentina. Antonio shoots Zoa dead. Valentina had killed Vincenzo. Petra gives Fright to Alba's young son.
3	"Emissaries of Darkness"	Maria Sole Tognazzi	Furio Andreotti, Giulia Calenda, Ilaria Macchia	Mensajeros de la oscuridad	September 28, 2020
After appearing on TV, Petra receives a jar with a severed penis. Formaldehyde degraded its DNA. Salvo orders Matteo and Nunzia to guard Petra. A second penis, delivered to her home, has a vine black wax crucifix. Penis removal occurred in cults but none currently known. At a bar-restaurant, a third penis is left for Petra: including a marble fragment. This leads to the Imperiale Hotel and foreman, Didyim. Egor investigates a related case: Kiril, a medical student, died of septicaemia after visiting Genoa. Egor describes the skoptsy and shows photos of members. Petra and Antonio recognise Didyim and close down the hotel construction, which is funded by the Russian mafia. Police track Kiril to Genoa uni. They attend Stefane's corpse, another student with a septic penectomy. A video of Stefane and Andrea has Petra recognise Andrea as the specimen sender. Egor visits Petra for sex. Andrea phones: he sent a fourth specimen. The police track his call, but he's suicided. Alba saw Matteo kidnapped by two men. His call history leads to Marcello. Petra meets Didyim: he wants safe-conduct. Next day police find him hanging. They catch Marcello at uni, show him Didyim's corpse and are told Matteo's location.
4	"Deathwatch"	Maria Sole Tognazzi	Furio Andreotti, Giulia Calenda, Ilaria Macchia	Muertos de papel	October 5, 2020
Antonio is stabbed: perpetrator runs off. Six days earlier: TV reports Giorgia's death. Petra investigates Dario's murder and notes his expensive taste. Ballistics show the gun was used in Rome. Going there they meet Mauro: it was used in a turf war. Amanda dines with Petra, Antonio joins. Petra believes both murders are linked. At Giorgia's flat they find a party invitation. Oreste's party video shows Giorgia, Dario, Giovanni and Simone. A manager recalls Dario and Giovanni meeting in his restaurant. Petra tries to confront Giovanni, Nicola arrives and dismisses her work as sloppy. The manager was bought off. Petra and Antonio are ordered back to Genoa. However, Petra tails Giovanni and deduces he is a closet homosexual. Antonio finds Simone via a gay website and books a date. Antonio finds Dario's phone in a bag. He gets stabbed and Simone runs out. Petra arrests Simone. He tells how Giorgia videotaped his session with Giovanni. She gave it to Dario for blackmail, Dario killed Giorgia when she wanted her share. Giovanni hired Simone to kill Dario. At Giovanni's interview, Petra comments on his loneliness and shunning by society. Giovanni agrees with her summary, admitting he hired Simone.

=== Season two ===
No. overall	No. in season	Title	Directed by	Written by	Based on	Original release date
5	1	"Serpents in Paradise"	Maria Sole Tognazzi	Unknown	Serpientes en el paraíso	September 21, 2022
6	2	"A Ship Loaded with Rice"	Maria Sole Tognazzi	Unknown	Un barco cargado de arroz	September 28, 2022
7	3	"Diabolical Carnival"	Maria Sole Tognazzi	Alicia Giménez Bartlett, Giulia Calenda, Furio Andreotti	TBA	October 5, 2022
8	4	"Empty Nest"	Maria Sole Tognazzi	Unknown	Nido vacío	October 12, 2022
