= My Summer with the Shark =

2023 Italian coming-of-age crime drama film

- Theatrical release poster
- Italian: Denti da squalo
- Directed by: Davide Gentile
- Written by: Valerio Cilio; Gianluca Leoncini
- Produced by: Gabriele Mainetti; Andrea Occhipinti; Mattia Guerra; Stefano Massenzi; Claudio Saraceni; Federico Saraceni; Jacopo Saraceni
- Starring: Tiziano Menichelli; Stefano Rosci; Virginia Raffaele; Edoardo Pesce; Claudio Santamaria
- Cinematography: Ivan Casalgrandi
- Edited by: Tommaso Gallone
- Music by: Michele Braga; Gabriele Mainetti
- Production companies: Goon Films; Lucky Red; Ideacinema; Rai Cinema
- Distributed by: Lucky Red
- Release dates: 1 June 2023 (Etnacon); 8 June 2023 (Italy)
- Running time: 104 minutes
- Country: Italy
- Language: Italian
- Budget: €3.5 million
- Box office: €249,609

My Summer with the Shark (Italian: Denti da squalo, lit. 'shark teeth') is a 2023 Italian coming-of-age crime drama film directed by Davide Gentile, in his feature film directorial debut, from a Solinas Award–winning screenplay written by Valerio Cilio and Gianluca Leoncini. The plot follows two street kids who befriend a captive great white shark. Virginia Raffaele, Edoardo Pesce, and Claudio Santamaria star in supporting roles. A co-production of Goon Films, Lucky Red and Ideacinema with the State–owned Rai Cinema, it was Gabriele Mainetti's debut as a producer outside of films he had himself directed.

The film premiered at the Etna Comics on 1 June 2023, before being released on 8 June 2023 by Lucky Red. It was a box office bomb, grossing €249,609 on a budget of €3.5 million.

== Plot ==
13-years-old Walter is off from school for the summer, still mourning the death of his father in a workplace accident. While idly wandering the Roman coast, he comes across by a seemingly abandoned villa with a grand swimming pool. He dives in, only to narrowly survive the encounter with a great white shark. Once the fear has passed, Walter comes back to the villa the following days to watch the shark. There he meets an older boy, Carlo, who explains to him he's the caretaker of the villa and the place belongs to a gangster known as Corsaro (lit. 'Privateer'), who uses it as a hideout. Corsaro keeps the shark there as a symbol of his power since it devoured an opponent of his years ago. Carlo allows Walter to come back whenever he wants to in exchange for bringing food for the shark. To do so, Walter begins to steal money at home and sells his father's possessions, much to his mother Rita's chagrin.

Over the course of that summer, Carlo and Walter become friends. When Walter runs out of money, Carlo suggests robbing a butcher's shop: however, the plan backfires and Walter saves Carlo by threatening the butcher at gunpoint, then making him feed two carcasses to the shark. Impressed, Carlo introduces him to the other members of his gang. To allow Walter to join the gang, its leader Tecno has him deal drugs. After Rita finds out, Walter runs away from home, settling in the villa.

Carlo and Walter figure out the shark is suffering from captivity. While daydreaming about setting it free, they forget that to collect some money for Tecno, which ends up stolen. Although Walter takes the blame, Tecno beats Carlo to a pulp and kicks them both out of the gang: Carlo gets angry at Walter and leaves. The next day, Carlo takes the gang to the villa to see the shark, hoping to be reinstated. When the boys start mistreating the shark, Walter tries to stop them, but he gets beaten by Tecno. Just when he's about to die, Corsaro arrives, knocks Tecno down and throws everyone out of his villa. The gangster commends Walter for his bravery.

Walter returns to his mother and, helped by a repentant Carlo, manages to set the shark free into the sea.

== Cast ==
- Tiziano Menichelli as Walter Di Santi
- Stefano Rosci as Carlo
- Virginia Raffaele as Rita, Walter's mother
- Edoardo Pesce as Corsaro
- Claudio Santamaria as Antonio, Walter's father
- Matteo Scattaretico as Tecno
- Roberto Fazioli as Biondo
- Alberto Testone as Barracuda

== Production ==
The screenplay for My Summer with the Shark by Valerio Cilio and Gianluca Leoncini won the 2014 Solinas Award as the best unproduced screenplay in Italy. Cilio and Leoncini however were unsatisfied with the script, which they originally wrote just in a couple of months, and continued to rework it for years, until Gabriele Mainetti became interested in the project and agreed to produce it through his company Goon Films. Mainetti decided not to direct the film himself because he wasn't "feeling the right emotional draw [to the story]", suggesting instead newcomer Davide Gentile based on his short film Food for Thought (2016). Other than acting as producer for another director for his first time, Mainetti also composed the score alongside his frequent collaborator Michele Braga, in another first for him.

== Release ==
My Summer with the Shark had its premiere on 1 June 2023 as the opening gala of the 11th Etna Comics. It was theatrically released on 8 June 2023 by Lucky Red, on 290 screens across Italy. It also played out of competition at the 53rd Giffoni Film Festival on 22 July 2023.

== Reception ==
Despited being released three days before the Ministry of Culture–sponsored "Cinema Revolution" initiative of €3.50 tickets for all European films, My Summer with the Shark was a box office bomb, grossing just €249,609 domestically on a budget of €3.5 million.

== Accolades ==
| Award | Date of ceremony | Category | Recipient | Result | Ref. |
|---|---|---|---|---|---|
| David di Donatello | 3 May 2024 | Best Visual Effects | Fabio Tomassetti, Daniele Tomassetti | Nominated | |
