= Like a Cat on a Highway =

2017 Italian comedy film

- Film poster
- Italian: Come un gatto in tangenziale
- Directed by: Riccardo Milani
- Written by: Furio Andreotti; Giulia Calenda; Paola Cortellesi; Riccardo Milani
- Produced by: Lorenzo Mieli; Mario Gianani
- Starring: Paola Cortellesi; Antonio Albanese
- Cinematography: Saverio Guarna
- Edited by: Patrizia Ceresani; Francesco Renda
- Music by: Andrea Guerra
- Release date: 28 December 2017
- Running time: 98 minutes
- Country: Italy
- Language: Italian

Like a Cat on a Highway (Italian: Come un gatto in tangenziale) is a 2017 Italian comedy film directed by Riccardo Milani.

A sequel was released in August 2021.

== Plot ==
Giovanni leads a think tank which is conducting a study for the European parliament, concerning whether the lives of poor people in peripheral areas can be improved by giving them money for entrepreneurial activities. When he returns from Brussels, he finds that his 13 year old daughter Agnese now has a boyfriend Alessio from Bastogi, one of the worst of these areas. While following Agnese, Giovanni meets Alessio's mother Monica under unfortunate circumstances. She ends up smashing his windshield with a baseball bat. When he gets to the building where Monica and Alessio live, he tries to dissuade Agnese from associating with them. Monica is not thrilled about her son taking up with a girl from the elite either, so Giovanni tries to ally with Monica to keep their children apart.

In the process, Giovanni and Monica start to go out together and to meet each other's families. Giovanni is raising Agnese on his own, because his ex-wife Luce has moved to France to raise lavender for perfumes. Monica and Alessio, by contrast, live in their small apartment with Monica's twin stepsisters Pamela and Sue Ellen (named after characters in Dallas). Alessio's father Sergio is in prison. Monica invites Giovanni and Agnese for a day at her favorite beach, the raucous Coccia di morto ("dead shell beach"). The following week Giovanni reciprocates, inviting Monica and Alessio to his beach, the quiet and staid Capalbio. Both Giovanni and Monica feel out of place in each other's worlds.

When Luce returns from France, Monica invites the whole family to lunch at her place. The lunch is interrupted by the sudden appearance of Sergio, who has just been pardoned and released. Sergio disparages Giovanni's and Luce's professions. Luce is shocked to imagine her daughter in such company and incites Giovanni against Alessio's family. Alessio and Agnese break up and the families each retreat into their own worlds again. However, Monica, who during the lunch took Sergio's side, understands that there was some truth in what Giovanni said, and when Sergio again ends up in jail starts to look into getting EU funding.

Giovanni flies to Brussels to obtain the disbursement of the funds. During his address to the commission, he abandons his prepared speech, describing instead how hard it is for poor people to get by. Monica uses the funding to start a pizzeria with her Bengalese neighbor, giving Pamela and Sue Ellen the job of delivering the pizzas. One evening, however, it is Monica herself delivering a pizza downtown, and we see that the delivery is for her and Giovanni. Seated on a bench in Piazza Cavour, they eat their pizza and reflect that their affair could last about as long as a cat on a highway.

== Cast ==
- Paola Cortellesi as Monica
- Antonio Albanese as Giovanni
- Sonia Bergamasco as Luce
- Luca Angeletti as Giulio
- Antonio D'Ausilio as Francesco
- Alice Maselli as Agnese
- Simone de Bianchi as Alessio
- Claudio Amendola as Sergio
- Valentina Giudicessa as Pamela
- Alessandra Giudicessa as Sue Ellen
- Giuditta Cambieri as Sister Costanza
- Silvia Cohen as landlord in Capalbio
