= Amiche da morire =

2013 film

- Directed by: Giorgia Farina
- Written by: Giorgia Farina; Fabio Bonifacci
- Produced by: Andrea Leone
- Starring: Claudia Gerini; Cristiana Capotondi; Sabrina Impacciatore; Vinicio Marchioni
- Cinematography: Maurizio Calvesi
- Edited by: Marco Spoletini
- Music by: Pasquale Catalano
- Release date: 2013
- Running time: 103 min
- Country: Italy
- Language: Italian

Amiche da morire (Friends to Die For) is a 2013 Italian black comedy film written and directed by Giorgia Farina, in her directorial debut. For this film, Farina received a David di Donatello nomination for best new director.

== Plot ==
Gilda, Olivia and Crocetta are three women who live on a small island of Sicily. The women try to live as they can: Gilda works as a call-girl for the affluent men of the island and the occasional tourist; Olivia is married to the most handsome man in town, a fisherman who is suspiciously always away working; and Crocetta is a spinster and a jinx who brings bad luck to every man who courts her.

A dangerous opportunity presents itself when the women go one night to an island cave because they suspect that Rocco, Olivia's husband, is going to meet an alleged lover there. Actually, Rocco is a trafficker who is trying to hide his loot in the cave. Olivia shoots her husband dead when he reveals that he never cared for her, and the three women decide to make the corpse disappear and keep the money, but soon the police and Rocco's criminal colleagues are on their trail. In fact, the men in pursuit do not care so much about the death of Rocco, but are looking for the loot that the women took.

== Cast ==
- Claudia Gerini: Gilda
- Cristiana Capotondi: Olivia
- Sabrina Impacciatore: Crocetta
- Vinicio Marchioni: Inspector Nico Malachia
- Marina Confalone: Donna Rosaria
- Corrado Fortuna: Lorenzo
- Antonella Attili: Miss Zuccalà
- Lucia Sardo: Mother of Crocetta
- Aurora Quattrocchi: Donna Assunta
