= Mom or Dad? =

2017 Italian comedy film

- Theatrical release poster
- Italian: Mamma o papà?
- Directed by: Riccardo Milani
- Written by: Giulia Calenda; Paola Cortellesi; Riccardo Milani
- Produced by: Lorenzo Mieli; Mario Gianani
- Starring: Antonio Albanese; Paola Cortellesi
- Cinematography: Saverio Guarna
- Edited by: Patrizia Ceresani
- Music by: Andrea Guerra
- Distributed by: Medusa Film
- Release date: 14 February 2017
- Running time: 98 minutes
- Country: Italy
- Language: Italian

Mom or Dad? (Italian: Mamma o papà?) is a 2017 Italian comedy film directed by Riccardo Milani.

It is a remake of the 2015 French film Daddy or Mommy (Papa ou maman).

== Cast ==
- Antonio Albanese as Nicola Vignali
- Paola Cortellesi as Valeria Mozzati
- Carlo Buccirosso as Gianrico Bertelli
- Matilde Gioli as Melania
- Luca Angeletti as Giorgio
- Roberto De Francesco as Federico
- Stefania Rocca as Sonia
- Claudio Gioè as Furio
- Marianna Cogo as Viola
- Luca Marino as Matteo
- Alvise Marascalchi as Giulietto
