= List of 2022 box office number-one films in Italy =

The following is a list of 2022 box office number-one films in Italy.

== Number-one films ==
†	This implies the highest-grossing movie of the year.

#	Weekend end date	Film	Gross	Notes	Ref.
1	January 9, 2022	Spider-Man: No Way Home	US$1,048,452		
2	January 16, 2022	Spider-Man: No Way Home	US$579,344		
3	January 23, 2022	The Wolf and the Lion	US$670,777		
4	January 30, 2022	Nightmare Alley	US$707,821		
5	February 6, 2022	Nightmare Alley	US$455,579		
6	February 13, 2022	Death on the Nile	US$2,069,228		
7	February 20, 2022	Uncharted	US$2,717,884		
8	February 27, 2022	Uncharted	US$1,495,634		
9	March 6, 2022	The Batman	US$4,027,819		
10	March 13, 2022	The Batman	US$2,350,642		
11	March 20, 2022	The Batman	US$1,149,503		
12	March 27, 2022	The Batman	US$607,208		
13	April 3, 2022	Morbius	US$1,770,407		
14	April 10, 2022	Morbius	US$593,910		
15	April 17, 2022	Morbius	US$590,634		
16	April 24, 2022	Fantastic Beasts: The Secrets of Dumbledore	US$1,854,699		
17	May 1, 2022	Fantastic Beasts: The Secrets of Dumbledore	US$677,676		
18	May 8, 2022	Doctor Strange in the Multiverse of Madness	US$6,579,103		
19	May 15, 2022	Doctor Strange in the Multiverse of Madness	US$1,917,019		
20	May 22, 2022	Top Gun: Maverick	US$863,640		
21	May 29, 2022	Top Gun: Maverick	US$2,879,141		
22	June 5, 2022	Jurassic World Dominion	US$3,414,545		
23	June 12, 2022	Jurassic World Dominion	US$1,361,429		
24	June 19, 2022	Lightyear	US$821,216		
25	June 25, 2022	Elvis	US$758,898		
26	July 3, 2022	Elvis	US$439,892		
27	July 10, 2022	Thor: Love and Thunder	US$3,550,055		
28	July 17, 2022	Thor: Love and Thunder	US$1,367,876		
29	July 24, 2022	Thor: Love and Thunder	US$668,245		
30	July 31, 2022	Thor: Love and Thunder	US$377,631		
31	August 7, 2022	Thor: Love and Thunder	US$247,572	Thor: Love and Thunder became the first film to top the box office for five consecutive weeks in 2022.	
32	August 14, 2022	Nope	US$275,785		
33	August 21, 2022	Minions: The Rise of Gru	US$4,459,800		
34	August 28, 2022	Minions: The Rise of Gru	US$2,166,418		
35	September 4, 2022	Minions: The Rise of Gru	US$1,263,783		
36	September 11, 2022	Minions: The Rise of Gru	US$619,990		
37	September 18, 2022	Minions: The Rise of Gru	US$488,402		
38	September 25, 2022	Avatar (2022 Re-release)	US$1,604,219		
39	October 2, 2022	Dragon Ball Super: Super Hero	US$840,267		
40	October 9, 2022	Ticket to Paradise	US$748,981		
41	October 16, 2022	The Hummingbird	US$782,389	The Hummingbird became the first Italian production to top the box office in 2022.	
42	October 23, 2022	Black Adam	US$1,960,590		
43	October 30, 2022	La stranezza	US$1,102,429		
44	November 6, 2022	La stranezza	US$1,091,685		
45	November 13, 2022	Black Panther: Wakanda Forever	US$3,509,138		
46	November 20, 2022	Black Panther: Wakanda Forever	US$1,743,708		
47	November 27, 2022	Black Panther: Wakanda Forever	US$670,683		
48	December 4, 2022	Vicini di casa	US$639,121		
49	December 11, 2022	Puss in Boots: The Last Wish	US$1,354,013		
50	December 18, 2022	Avatar: The Way of Water †	US$8,991,132	Avatar: The Way of Water had the highest weekend debut of 2022.	
51	December 25, 2022	Avatar: The Way of Water †	US$4,598,467		
52	January 1, 2023	Avatar: The Way of Water †	US$5,388,129		

== Highest-grossing films of 2022 ==
Highest-grossing films of 2022 (In-year release)
Rank	Title	Distributor	Domestic gross
1.	Avatar: The Way of Water	Disney	$48,025,161
2.	Minions: The Rise of Gru	Universal	$15,340,382
3.	Doctor Strange in the Multiverse of Madness	Disney	$14,487,541
4.	Top Gun: Maverick	Paramount	$13,995,686
5.	Thor: Love and Thunder	Disney	$11,157,281
6.	The Batman	Warner Bros.	$10,750,112
7.	Fantastic Beasts: The Secrets of Dumbledore	Warner Bros.	$8,866,901
8.	Black Panther: Wakanda Forever	Disney	$8,795,100
9.	Jurassic World Dominion	Universal	$8,704,766
10.	Il grande giorno	Medusa Film	$8,021,940

== See also ==
- List of 2023 box office number-one films in Italy
