= Sonia Bergamasco =

Italian actress (born 1966)

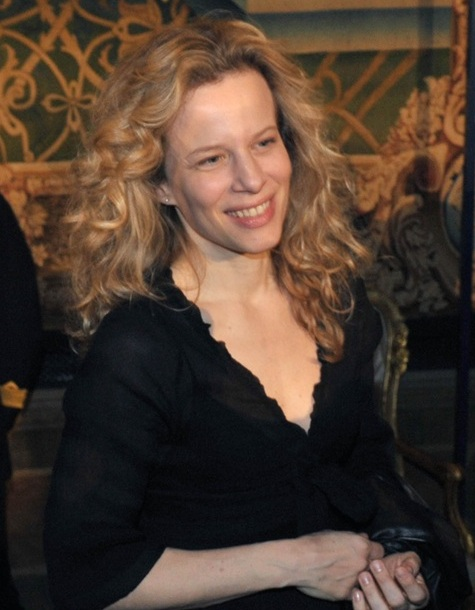
- Born: 16 January 1966 (age 60); Milan, Italy
- Occupation: Actress
- Height: 1.68 m (5 ft 6 in)
- Spouse: Fabrizio Gifuni (m. 2000)
- Children: 2

Sonia Bergamasco (born 16 January 1966) is an Italian actress.

Born in Milan, Bergamasco graduated in piano at the Giuseppe Verdi Conservatory and then enrolled the drama school of the Piccolo Teatro, graduating in 1990. The same year, she made her stage debut in Giorgio Strehler's Arlecchino dei giovani.

She made her film debut in 1994, in the film Miracoli, storie per corti, in the segment Antonio Mastronunzio pittore sannita directed by Mario Martone. In 2001 she had her breakout role as Sofia, the main character in Giuseppe Bertolucci's Probably Love. In 2004 thanks to her performance in The Best of Youth she won the Nastro d'Argento for Best Actress along with the rest of the female cast.

Bergamasco is married to actor Fabrizio Gifuni, since 2000. They have two daughters.

== Filmography ==
=== Film ===
Year	Title	Role(s)	Notes
1994	D'estate	Chiara	Short film
2000	Il mnemonista	Eva	
2001	Probably Love	Sofia	
2001	Voices	Ludovica Bari	
2003	Amorfù	Elena	
2003	The Best of Youth	Giulia Monfalco	
2005	Musikanten	Marta	
2007	Niente è come sembra	Hildegard of Bingen	
2008	Wild Blood	Prisoner	Cameo appearance
2009	La straniera	Giada	
2009	Giulia Doesn't Date at Night	Benedetta Montani	
2010	The Woman of My Dreams	Carolina	
2010	Maledimiele	Anna	
2011	Make a Fake	Giulia	
2012	Me and You	Arianna Cuni	
2015	Rubando bellezza	Herself	Documentary
2016	Quo Vado?	Dr. Sironi	
2017	Like a Cat on a Highway	Luce	
2017	Bloody Richard	Regina Madre	
2021	Like a Cat on a Highway 2	Luce	
2022	I cassamortari	Maddalena Grandi	
2023	Thank You Guys	Laura	
2024	The Life Apart	Erminia Macola	

=== Television ===
Year	Title	Role(s)	Notes
2005	De Gasperi – L'uomo della speranza	Francesca Romani	Two-parts television movie
2008	Einstein	Elsa Einstein	Television movie
2008–2010	Tutti pazzi per amore	Lea De Angelis	Main role (season 1–2)
2009	Bakhita	Angelica Marin	Two-parts television movie
2012–2015	Una grande famiglia	Laura Rengoni	Main role
2016–2021	Inspector Montalbano	Livia Burlando	Main role (season 10–15)
2021	La scelta di Maria	Maria Bergamas	Television movie
2022	Stanotte a…	Alda Merini	Episode: "Stanotte a Milano"
2024	My Brilliant Friend	Maria Rosa Airota	2 episodes
