= Thank You Guys =

- Theatrical release poster
- Directed by: Riccardo Milani
- Written by: Riccardo Milani; Michele Astori
- Produced by: Carlo Degli Esposti; Lorenzo Gangarossa; Mario Gianani; Nicola Serra
- Starring: Antonio Albanese; Vinicio Marchioni; Giacomo Ferrara; Giorgio Montanini; Andrea Lattanzi; Fabrizio Bentivoglio
- Cinematography: Saverio Guarna
- Edited by: Patrizia Ceresani; Francesco Renda
- Music by: Davide Canori
- Production companies: Palomar; Wildside
- Distributed by: Vision Distribution
- Release date: January 12, 2023
- Running time: 117 minutes
- Country: Italy
- Language: Italian

Thank You Guys (Italian: Grazie ragazzi) is a 2023 Italian comedy-drama film directed by Riccardo Milani who co-wrote the screenplay with Michele Astori. It stars Antonio Albanese accompanied with Sonia Bergamasco, Vinicio Marchioni, Giacomo Ferrara, Giorgio Montanini, Andrea Lattanzi and Fabrizio Bentivoglio. It is an Italian-language remake of the 2020 French film The Big Hit, inspired in turn by a true story that occurred in Sweden in the 1980s.

== Synopsis ==
In the absence of job offers, Antonio, a passionate but often unemployed actor, accepts the job offered to him by an old friend and colleague, much smarter than him, as a teacher in a theater workshop at a penitentiary institute. Hesitant at first, he discovers talent in the unlikely company of inmates and this rekindles his passion and desire to do theater, to the point of convincing the stern prison director to cross the prison walls and stage the famous comedy by Samuel Beckett Waiting for Godot on a real theater stage.

== Cast ==
The actors participating in this film are:

- Antonio Albanese as Antonio
- Sonia Bergamasco as Laura
- Vinicio Marchioni as Diego
- Giacomo Ferrara as Aziz
- Giorgio Montanini as Mignolo
- Andrea Lattanzi as Damiano
- Fabrizio Bentivoglio as Michele
- Nicola Rignanese as Ettore
- Bogdan Iordachioiu

== Production ==
Principal photography took place between the end of November and the beginning of December 2021 in Siena, Italy.

== Release ==
Thank You Guys premiered on January 12, 2023, in Italian cinemas, then had its television screening on June 12 of the same year on Sky Cinema.

== Accolades ==
Year	Award	Category	Recipient	Result	Ref.
2023	Nastro d'Argento	Best Comedy	Thank You Guys	Nominated	
2023	Nastro d'Argento	Best Comedy Actor	Antonio Albanese	Won	
