= Figli =

2020 film

- Directed by: Giuseppe Bonito
- Written by: Mattia Torre
- Produced by: Mario Gianani; Lorenzo Mieli
- Starring: Valerio Mastandrea; Paola Cortellesi
- Cinematography: Roberto Forza
- Edited by: Giogiò Franchini
- Music by: Giuliano Taviani
- Release date: 23 January 2020
- Running time: 97 minutes
- Country: Italy
- Language: Italian

Figli (lit. 'Children') is a 2020 Italian comedy film directed by Giuseppe Bonito. The film was the last work written by screenwriter Mattia Torre before his death.

== Background ==
Figli is based on a semi-autobiographical monologue by Mattia Torre, I figli invecchiano, about the mixed emotions of raising a child. After Torre's performance of the monologue on Alessandro Cattelan's television show E Poi C'è Cattelan in 2018 went viral, he planned to adapt it to film, but he soon grew too ill to follow through. Torre's longtime collaborator Giuseppe Bonito finished the film after the screenwriter's death. Torre's friends Paola Cortellesi and Valerio Mastandrea were cast as the two leads.

== Plot ==
Figli is a tragicomedy about parenthood told in vignettes. Nicola (Valerio Mastandrea), Sara (Paola Cortellesi), and their 6-year-old daughter Anna lead a blissful existence until the birth of the couple's second child, Pietro, which strains the couple's relationship and throws their lives into disarray.

== Cast ==
- Valerio Mastandrea – Nicola
- Paola Cortellesi – Sara
- Stefano Fresi – amico giornalista
- Giorgio Barchiesi – padre di Nicola
- Andrea Sartoretti – padre milionario
- Fabio Traversa – Anziano Prete

== Awards and Festivals ==
The film has received several significant awards and nominations:

- Italian National Syndicate of Film Journalists (Nastri D'Argento):
  - 2020: Won Best Comedy.
  - 2020: Won Best Actor in a Comedy (Valerio Mastandrea).
  - 2020: Won Best Actress in a Comedy (Paola Cortellesi).
- David di Donatello Awards:
  - 2021: Won Best Original Screenplay (Mattia Torre).
  - 2021: Nominated: Best Actor (Valerio Mastandrea).
  - 2021: Nominated: Best Actress (Paola Cortellesi).
  - 2021: Nominated: Best Editing.
