= Horses (film) =

- Film poster
- Italian: Cavalli
- Directed by: Michele Rho
- Produced by: Lucky Red
- Starring: Vinicio Marchioni; Michele Alhaique
- Cinematography: Andrea Locatelli
- Edited by: Luca Benedetti
- Music by: Nicola Tescari
- Release date: 5 September 2011 (Venice Film Festival)
- Running time: 92 minutes
- Country: Italy
- Language: Italian

Horses (Italian: Cavalli) is a 2014 Italian drama film written and directed by Michele Rho. It premiered out of competition at the 68th Venice International Film Festival.

== Cast ==
- Vinicio Marchioni as Alessandro
- Michele Alhaique as Pietro
- Giulia Michelini as Veronica
- Antonella Attili as Amanda
- Duccio Camerini as Pancia
- Asia Argento as Mother
- Cesare Apolito as Father
- Pippo Delbono as Dario
- Andrea Occhipinti as Inglese
