= Vinicio Marchioni =

Italian actor

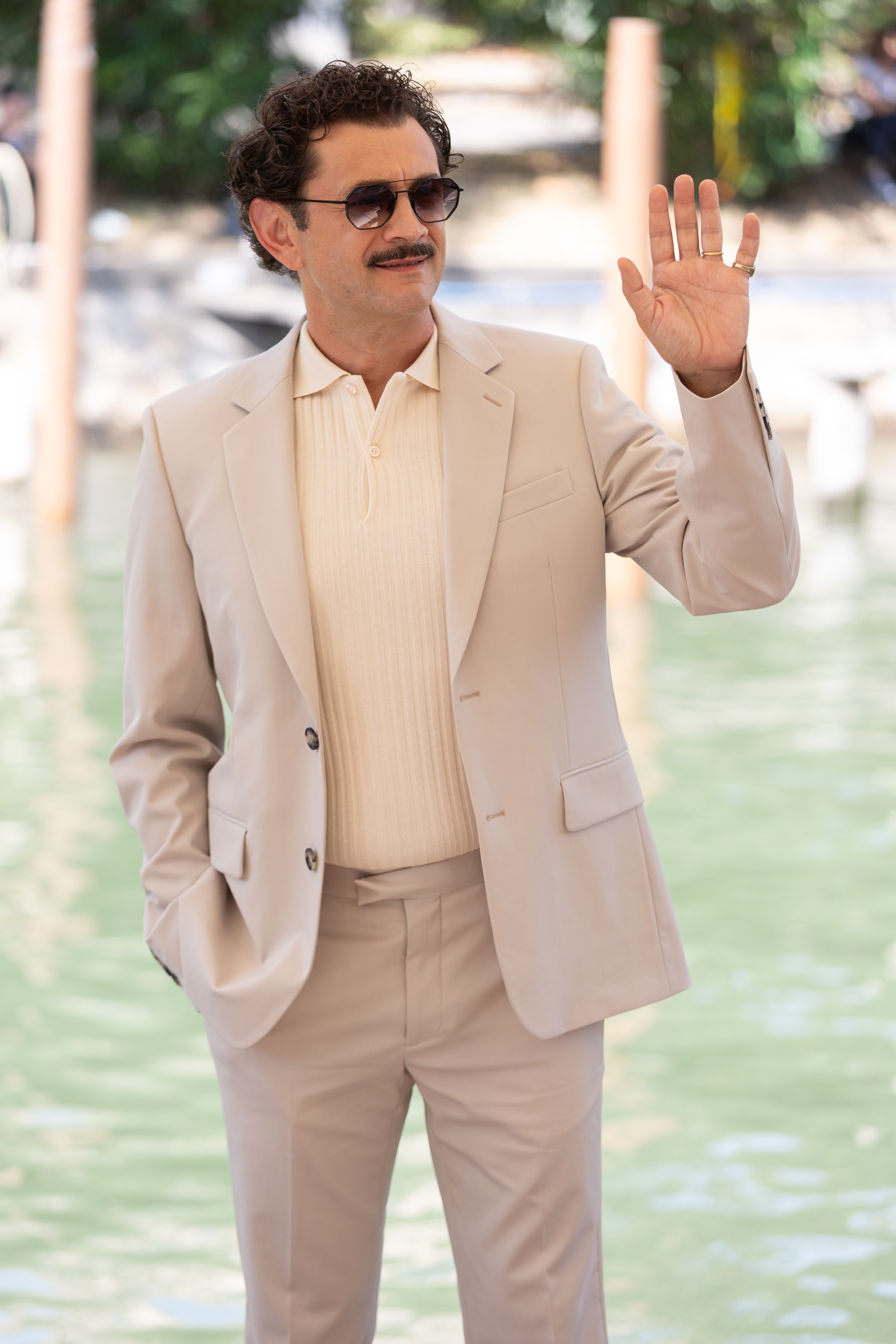
- Born: 10 August 1975 (age 51); Rome, Italy
- Occupation: Actor
- Years active: 2006–present

Vinicio Marchioni (born 10 August 1975) is an Italian actor. With a career spanning between television, film and stage, he's best known for playing Fabrizio "Freddo" Soleri in the crime drama series Romanzo criminale – La serie (2008–2010) and Captain Parisi in the Western series Django (2023), for which he was nominated for a Nastro d'Argento for Best Supporting Actor in a TV Series.

== Filmography ==
=== Film ===
Year	Title	Role(s)	Notes
2009	Feisbum	Giulio	
2010	18 Years Later	Lawyer Camilli	
2010	20 Cigarettes	Aureliano Amadei	
2011	Cuore di clown	Braciola	Short film
2011	Easy!	Mario Cecere	
2011	Horses	Alessandro	
2011	Sulla strada di casa	Alberto	
2012	To Rome with Love	Aldo Romano	
2012	Un consiglio a Dio	Bodies Chaser	Documentary
2012	Twice Born	Fabio	
2012	Ombre	Angelo	Short film
2013	Amiche da morire	Inspector Nico Malachia	
2013	A Liberal Passion	Bernardo Callieri	
2013	Miele	Stefano	
2013	South Is Nothing	Cristiano	
2013	Third Person	Carlo	
2014	Blame Freud	Fabio	
2015	Max Fortuna	Max Fortuna	Short film
2015	Burning Love	Fictional Leonardo	
2017	Socialmente pericolosi	Fabio Valente	
2017	Tainted Souls	Marcello	
2017	The Place	Gigi	
2018	As Needed	Arturo Cavalieri	
2018	Chronophobia	Michael Suter	
2018	Ötzi and the Mystery of Time	Carlo	
2018	Drive Me Home	Antonio	
2019	Don't Stop Me Now	Marco	
2019	Dolcissime	Alessandro	
2019	Into the Labyrinth	Simon Berish	
2020	Villetta con ospiti	Father Carlo	
2020	The Predators	Clocks Seller	Cameo apoesrance
2021	Governance	Michele Laudato	
2021	Il giorno e la notte	Marco	
2021	Superheroes	Vittorio	
2022	Ghiaccio	Massimo	
2022	Dry	Luca	
2022	Caravaggio's Shadow	Giovanni Baglione	
2022	Vicini di casa	Salvatore	
2023	Thank You Guys	Diego	
2023	Mia	Marco's Father	
2023	There's Still Tomorrow	Nino	
2024	Another Summer Holiday	Cesare Canocchia	
2024	Diamonds	Bruno	
2025	Hungry Bird	Guido	
2025	Tired of Killing: Autobiography of an Assassin	Antonio Zagari	
2026	Il dio dell'amore	Filippo	

=== Television ===
Year	Title	Role(s)	Notes
2006	R.I.S. – Delitti imperfetti	Bartender	Episode: "Insospettabile"
2008–2010	Romanzo criminale – La serie	Fabrizio "Freddo" Soleri	Main role; 22 episodes
2010	Crimini	Domenico Fiore	Episode: "Luce del nord"
2014	Francesco	Elias of Cortona	Two-parts television movie
2014	Un mondo nuovo	Altiero Spinelli	Television movie
2015	L'Oriana	Alexandros Panagoulis	Two-parts television movie
2016	Luisa Spagnoli	Annibale Spagnoli	Television movie
2017	1993	Massimo D'Alema	2 episodes
2018	54 Hours: The Gladbeck Hostage Crisis	Aldo De Giorgi	Two-parts television movie
2019	1994	Massimo D'Alema	2 episodes
2021	Alfredino: Una storia italiana	Nando Broglio	2 episodes
2023	Django	Captain Parisi	Recurring role; 3 episodes
2023	The Lions of Sicily	Paolo Florio	Episode: "Episode One"
2004	Call My Agent - Italia	Himself	Episode: "Romanzo criminale"

== Awards and nominations ==
Year	Award	Category	Work	Result	Ref.
2023	Nastri d'Argento Grandi Serie	Best Supporting Actor	Django	Nominated	
