= Auguri professore =

- Directed by: Riccardo Milani
- Written by: Domenico Starnone, Riccardo Milani, Sandro Pretaglia
- Produced by: Mario Cecchi Gori, Vittorio Cecchi Gori, Rita Rusic
- Starring: Silvio Orlando; Claudia Pandolfi
- Cinematography: Alessandro Pesci
- Music by: Claudio Guidetti
- Release date: 1997
- Running time: 95 min
- Country: Italy
- Language: Italian

Auguri professore (Good Luck Professor) is a 1997 Italian comedy drama film directed by Riccardo Milani.

== Plot ==
The film is set in a school near Rome, and in a small mountain village of Abruzzo. The boys of the grammar school where teaches Professor Vincenzo Lipari, Italian teacher, are in serious crisis. The crisis, however, is not only that of a typical young adolescent: it is a real collective crisis that pushes young students to not studying, and caring of life, to believe in false ideals, and to get lost in the vortex of ignorance, that will not get them in any future. Vincenzo Lipari tries to help the guys, but also he is a frustrated like them, because they can not even organize a program of Italian lessons of the year. And so the man, trying to understand the new requirements youth, recalls his early school years: past, when teachers did not have to ask pupils to behave well in school, because it was all the opposite.

== Cast ==
- Silvio Orlando as Professor Lipari
- Claudia Pandolfi as Luisa
- Duilio Del Prete as the headmaster
- Imma Piro as Professor Sollazzo
