= The Soul's Place =

- Directed by: Riccardo Milani
- Written by: Domenico Starnone; Riccardo Milani
- Produced by: Lionello Cerri
- Starring: Silvio Orlando; Michele Placido; Claudio Santamaria; Paola Cortellesi
- Cinematography: Arnaldo Catinari
- Edited by: Marco Spoletini
- Music by: Leandro Piccioni
- Distributed by: 01 Distribution
- Release date: 2003
- Running time: 103 min
- Language: Italian

The Soul's Place (Italian: Il posto dell'anima, also known as The Soul's Haven) is a 2003 Italian romantic comedy-drama film, written and directed by Riccardo Milani. For his performance Silvio Orlando was awarded best actor at the Montreal World Film Festival, while Milani won the Premio Flaiano for best director.

== Plot ==
At the port of Vasto, Abruzzo city, the "Carair" car tire factory is about to close, for fraudulent bankruptcy. The factory workers are Tonino, Salvatore and Mario, who struggle with all their strength to prevent layoffs. Tonino does not know that he has a tumor since he has been exposed for many years by the tires of the wheel covers, and he thinks he is happy to live with Nina, a girl who lives in Milan, with whom she runs the weekend in the Abruzzo mountains, looking for the rare bear of Marsica. The workers' protest attracts political opinion, so Tonino, Marco and Salvatore get a meeting in Brussels and then in America, where the Carair multinational is located, getting to work. But right now, Tonino's tumor gets worse...

== Cast ==
- Silvio Orlando as Antonio, aka "Tonino"
- Michele Placido as Salvatore
- Claudio Santamaria as Mario
- Paola Cortellesi as Nina
- Imma Piro as Maddalena
- Flavio Pistilli as Giannino
- Maria Laura Rondanini as Manuela
