= Like a Cat on a Highway 2 =

2021 Italian comedy film

- Film poster
- Italian: Come un gatto in tangenziale - Ritorno a Coccia di Morto
- Directed by: Riccardo Milani
- Written by: Furio Andreotti; Giulia Calenda; Paola Cortellesi; Riccardo Milani
- Produced by: Lorenzo Mieli
- Starring: Paola Cortellesi; Antonio Albanese
- Cinematography: Saverio Guarna
- Edited by: Patrizia Ceresani; Francesco Renda
- Music by: Andrea Guerra
- Distributed by: Vision Distribution
- Release date: 26 August 2021
- Running time: 109 minutes
- Country: Italy
- Language: Italian

Like a Cat on a Highway 2 (Italian: Come un gatto in tangenziale - Ritorno a Coccia di Morto) is a 2021 Italian comedy film directed by Riccardo Milani, sequel to the 2017 film Like a Cat on a Highway. Distributed by Vision Distribution, the film premiered on 26 August 2021.

== Cast ==
- Paola Cortellesi as Monica
- Antonio Albanese as Giovanni
- Luca Argentero as don Davide
- Sonia Bergamasco as Luce
- Claudio Amendola as Sergio
- Mariano Rigillo as don Vincenzo
- Sarah Felberbaum as Camilla
- Alice Maselli as Agnese
- Simone de Bianchi as Alessio
- Valentina Giudicessa as Pamela
- Alessandra Giudicessa as Sue Ellen
- Beatrice Schiros as Sister Maria Catena
- Franca Leosini as herself
