= Misunderstood (2014 film) =

2014 film

- Film poster
- Directed by: Asia Argento
- Written by: Barbara Alberti; Asia Argento
- Produced by: Mario Gianani; Eric Heumann; Maurice Kantor; Lorenzo Mieli
- Starring: Giulia Salerno; Charlotte Gainsbourg; Gabriel Garko
- Cinematography: Nicola Pecorini
- Edited by: Filippo Barbieri
- Release dates: 22 May 2014 (Cannes); 5 June 2014 (Italy)
- Running time: 103 minutes
- Countries: Italy; France
- Language: Italian

Misunderstood (Italian: Incompresa) is a 2014 Italian drama film directed by Asia Argento. It was selected to compete in the Un Certain Regard section at the 2014 Cannes Film Festival.

== Plot ==
Aria is the sensitive little daughter of a female concert pianist and an actor. Both neglect her in favour of their children from earlier relationships. Eventually she also has to face the fact that both parents are heading for a divorce.

== Cast ==
- Giulia Salerno as Aria
- Charlotte Gainsbourg as Mother
- Gabriel Garko as Father
- Gianmarco Tognazzi as Dodo
- Justin Pearson as Ricky
- Anna Lou Castoldi as Donatina
- Max Gazzè as Manuel Ginori
- Alice Pea as Angelica
- Carolina Poccioni as Lucrezia
- The Penelopes as themselves

== Reception ==
On Rotten Tomatoes, the film has an approval rating of 80% based on 15 critics, and the average rating is 6.7/10.

Peter Sobczynski from Roger Ebert.com gave it a 3.5 out of 4 stars, and wrote "An occasionally strange, occasionally brutal and occasionally lovely work that goes up on the shelf with 'The Ocean of Helena Lee' and 'Girlhood' as one of the more impressive coming-of-age tales of recent times." The A.V. Club's Adam Nayman gave it a C+, and stated "The ostensible boldness of Misunderstood is undermined by the sense that it's also pandering-that its view of childhood as a bourgeois horror-show is at least as salable on the art-house circuit as it is authentic to its creator's experiences."
