= True Love (2012 film) =

- Film poster
- Directed by: Enrico Clerico Nasino
- Written by: Fabio Guaglione; Fabio Resinaro
- Produced by: Fabio Guaglione; Fabio Resinaro; Mario Gianani; Lorenzo Mieli; Fausto Brizzi; Marco Martani; Peter Safran
- Starring: John Brotherton; Ellen Hollman
- Cinematography: Paolo Bellan
- Edited by: Tommaso Norfo; Fabio Guaglione
- Music by: Andrea Bonini
- Production companies: Mercurio Domina; Wildside; TF1 Droits Audiovisuels; Rai Cinema
- Release date: May 4, 2012 (Sci-Fi-London)
- Running time: 102 minutes
- Countries: Italy; United States
- Language: English

True Love is a 2012 romantic-themed psychological thriller film directed by Enrico Clerico Nasino and starring John Brotherton and Ellen Hollman.

== Premise ==
Right after their marriage, lovebirds Jack and Kate mysteriously wake up in separate cells from which they cannot escape. Instead they are forced to watch CCTV videos which reveal the other's dirty secrets, and answer yes–no questions about their trust for their partner.

== Cast ==
- John Brotherton as Jack Reilly
- Ellen Hollman as Kate Sunderland
- Gabriel Myers as Eric Drake a.k.a. Mark Weinstock, Kate's lover
- Jay Harrington as Sam, Jack's friend
- Clare Carey as Dana, Kate's friend
- Tyrees Allen as Jack's therapist
- Rand Holdren as Kevin, a playboy
- Mick Lea

== Reception ==
Twitch Film's Shelagh Rowan-Legg gave a generally positive review, writing that the set design makes audiences "squirm in their seats". Carole Jahme of The Guardian called the film "a letdown" and criticised both the script and performances.
