= Do You See Me? (film) =

- Italian: Scusate se esisto!
- Directed by: Riccardo Milani
- Written by: Giulia Calenda; Paola Cortellesi; Furio Andreotti; Riccardo Milani
- Produced by: Fulvio Lucisano; Federica Lucisano
- Starring: Paola Cortellesi; Raoul Bova
- Cinematography: Saverio Guarna
- Music by: Andrea Guerra
- Distributed by: IIF
- Release date: 20 November 2014
- Running time: 98 minutes
- Country: Italy
- Language: Italian

Do You See Me? (Italian: Scusate se esisto!) is a 2014 Italian comedy film written and directed by Riccardo Milani and starring Paola Cortellesi and Raoul Bova. It grossed $6,571,282 at the Italian box office.

== Plot ==
With a brilliant career in London, Serena, an architect originally from Abruzzo, decides to return to work in Italy, in Rome. For a woman to get a job at the height of her qualification as a really good architect proves to be difficult, until she decides to pass herself as a man. So she decides to work in the redevelopment of the Corviale district.

In Rome, meanwhile, she meets Francesco, and she becomes instantly attracted to him. When she understands he is a homosexual man, the two of them become close friends and start a long lasting relationship. As he will help her pretending to be the man behind her project for the Corviale district, and doing so making the contractors produce and give a monetary value to her/his idea, she will help him coming out to his son, that he had had from a previous marriage.

== Cast ==
- Paola Cortellesi as Serena Bruno
- Raoul Bova as Francesco
- Corrado Fortuna as Pietro
- Lunetta Savino as Michela
- Marco Bocci as Nicola
- Ennio Fantastichini as Dr. Ripamonti
- Cesare Bocci as Volponi
- Stefania Rocca as Maria
- Armando De Razza as Ennio Tintozzi

== See also ==
- List of Italian films of 2014
