= Piano, solo =

- Directed by: Riccardo Milani
- Written by: Ivan Cotroneo; Riccardo Milani; Sandro Petraglia; Claudio Piersanti
- Starring: Kim Rossi Stuart; Jasmine Trinca; Paola Cortellesi; Michele Placido
- Cinematography: Arnaldo Catinari
- Edited by: Marco Spoletini
- Music by: Lele Marchitelli
- Release date: 8 September 2007
- Language: Italian

Piano, solo is a 2007 Italian drama film directed by Riccardo Milani. It is based on the book by Walter Veltroni Il disco del mondo - Vita breve di Luca Flores, musicista and it depicts real life events of jazz pianist and composer Luca Flores (it).

== Cast ==
- Kim Rossi Stuart as Luca Flores
- Michele Placido as Giovanni
- Jasmine Trinca as Cinzia
- Alba Rohrwacher as Marta
- Mariella Valentini as Heidi
- Sandra Ceccarelli as Jolanda
- Claudio Gioè as Alessandro
- Roberto De Francesco as Raffaele
- Corso Salani as Pablo
- Paola Cortellesi as Baba

== Reception and awards ==
For her performance in Piano, solo, Paola Cortellesi was nominated for David di Donatello awards as the Best Supporting Actress.
