= Alicia Giménez Bartlett =

Spanish writer

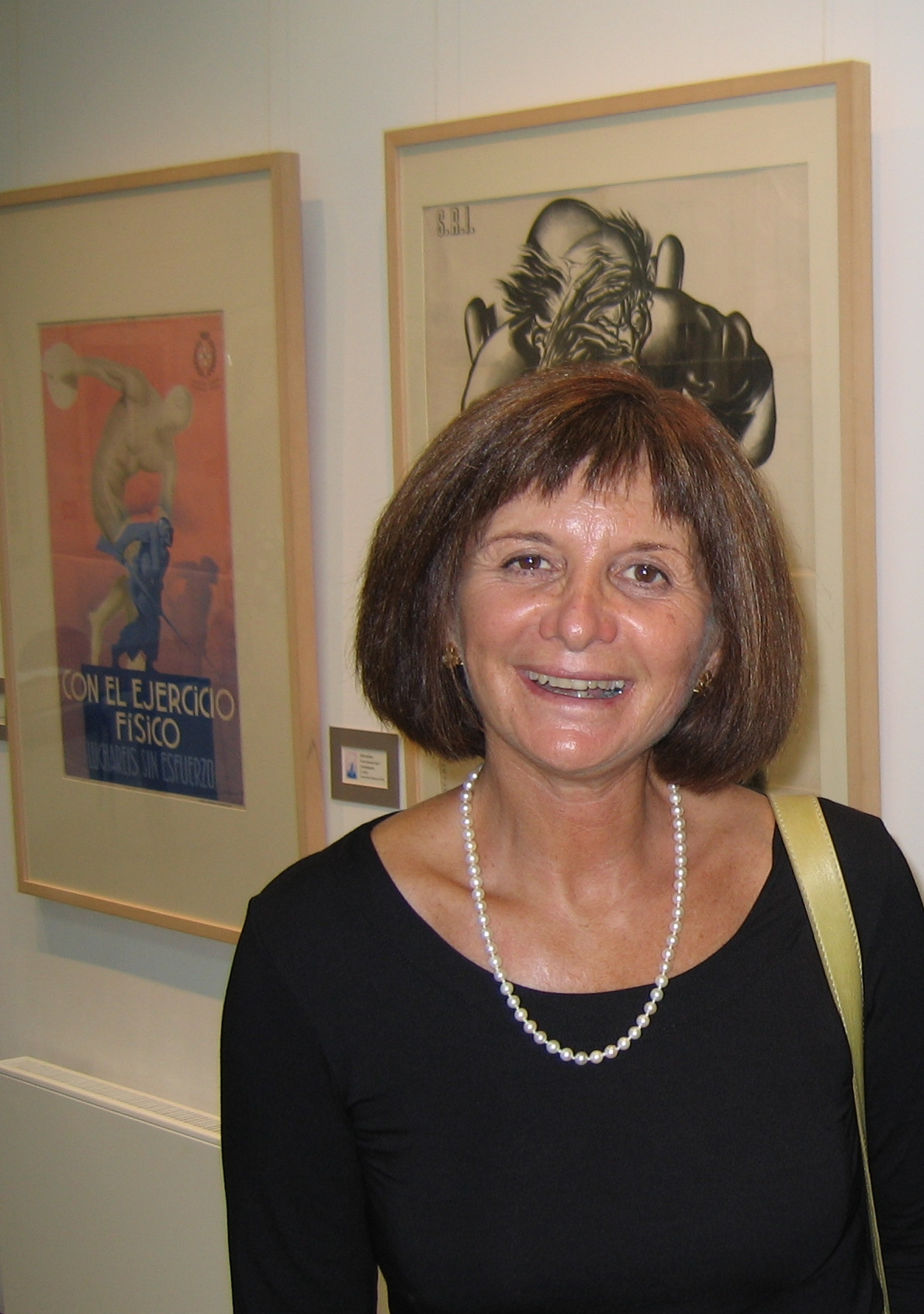
- Born: 10 June 1951; Almansa
- Writing career
- Genre: detective novels
- Notable awards: Premio Femenino Singular; Premio Nadal

Alicia Giménez Bartlett (born 10 June 1951 in Almansa, Albacete, Spain) is a Spanish writer particularly known for her series of detective novels with protagonist Petra Delicado.

== Biography ==
Her first novel, Exit was published in 1984. In 1997, she published Una habitación ajena (A Faraway Room) concerning the tensions between the lesbian writer Virginia Woolf and her servant "Nelly", and this won her the Premio Femenino Singular.

The Petra Delicado novels have been published in various languages and are very popular in Germany and Italy. In 1999 Petra Delicado appeared as the protagonist of a television series. Four of her novels have been used for an Italian TV four-part series: Petra, first broadcast in September 2020. In 2011 Bartlett won the Premio Nadal for Donde nadie te encuentre.

She has lived in Barcelona since 1975.

== Bibliography ==
- Exit (1984, Seix Barral)
- Pájaros de oro (1987, Montesinos)
- Caídos en el valle (1989, Montesinos)
- El cuarto corazón (1991, Versal)
- Vida sentimental de un camionero (1993, Lumen)
- La última copa del verano (1995, Grijalbo-Mondadori)
- Ritos de muerte (1996, Grijalbo-Mondadori). Petra Delicado 1st novel
- Día de perros (1997, Grijalbo-Mondadori). Petra Delicado 2nd novel
- Una habitación ajena (1997, Belacqua). Premio Femenino Lumen
- Mensajeros de la oscuridad (1999, Plaza & Janés). Petra Delicado 3rd novel
- Muertos de papel (2000, Plaza & Janés). Petra Delicado 4th novel
- Serpientes en el paraíso (2002, Planeta). Petra Delicado 5th novel
- Secreta Penélope (2003, Seix Barral)
- Un barco cargado de arroz (2004, Planeta). Petra Delicado 6th novel
- Días de amor y engaños (2006, Planeta)
- Nido vacío (2007, Planeta). Petra Delicado 7th novel
- El silencio de los claustros (2009, Destino). Petra Delicado 8th novel
- Donde nadie te encuentre (2011, Destino). Premio Nadal
- Nadie quiere saber (2013, Destino). Petra Delicado 9th novel
- Crímenes que no olvidaré (2015). 10th novel in the Petra Delicado series.
- Hombres desnudos (2015, Planeta). Premio Planeta.
- Mi querido asesino en serie (2017, Destino). 11th novel in the Petra Delicado series.
