= If Only (2019 film) =

2019 film

- Directed by: Ginevra Elkann
- Written by: Ginevra Elkann; Chiara Barzini
- Produced by: Lorenzo Gangarossa; Mario Gianani; Lorenzo Mieli; Paul-Dominique Win Vacharasinthu
- Starring: Riccardo Scamarcio; Alba Rohrwacher
- Cinematography: Vladan Radovic
- Edited by: Desideria Rayner
- Music by: Riccardo Sinigallia
- Production companies: Wildside; Iconoclast
- Release date: 7 August 2019 (LFF)
- Running time: 104 minutes
- Countries: France; Italy
- Languages: Italian; French; English

If Only (Italian: Magari) is a 2019 French/Italian comedy-drama film directed by Ginevra Elkann.

== Plot ==
Alma and her two older brothers Sebastian and Jean live with their mother Charlotte (Céline Sallette) and stepfather Pavel in Paris. The family has converted to their stepfaher's religion, Russian Orthodoxy. The children fly to Rome to spend the Christmas holiday with their father Carlo (Riccardo Scamarcio). Carlo's girlfriend Benedetta (Alba Rohrwacher) joins them for a holiday by the sea.

== Cast ==
- Riccardo Scamarcio - Carlo
- Alba Rohrwacher - Benedetta
- Céline Sallette - Charlotte
- Benjamin Baroche - Pavel
- Oro De Commarque - Alma
- Milo Roussel - Sebastian
- Ettore Giustiniani - Jean
- Brett Gelman - Bruce
