= There's Still Tomorrow =

2023 Italian film

- Directed by: Paola Cortellesi
- Screenplay by: Paola Cortellesi; Furio Andreotti; Giulia Calenda
- Produced by: Lorenzo Gangarossa; Mario Gianani
- Starring: Paola Cortellesi; Valerio Mastandrea; Romana Maggiora Vergano; Emanuela Fanelli; Giorgio Colangeli; Vinicio Marchioni
- Cinematography: Davide Leone
- Edited by: Valentina Mariani
- Music by: Lele Marchitelli
- Production companies: Wildside; Vision Distribution
- Distributed by: Vision Distribution
- Release dates: 18 October 2023 (RFF); 26 October 2023
- Running time: 118 minutes
- Country: Italy
- Languages: Italian (Romanesco dialect) (Minor dialogue in English)
- Box office: $50.2 million

There's Still Tomorrow (Italian: C'è ancora domani [ˈtʃɛ aŋˈkoːra doˈmaːni]) is a 2023 Italian period comedy-drama film, co-written and directed by Paola Cortellesi in her directorial debut. Set in postwar 1940s Italy, it follows Delia breaking traditional family patterns and aspiring to a different future, after receiving a mysterious letter. It stars Cortellesi, Romana Maggiora Vergano, Emanuela Fanelli, Valerio Mastandrea, Francesco Centorame, Vinicio Marchioni and Giorgio Colangeli. There's Still Tomorrow was shot in black-and-white.

The film won three prizes at the Rome Film Festival, the Nastro d'Argento of 2024 and was the most successful film at the Italian box office in 2023, and nominally the 10th highest-grossing film in the country of all time. Italian film critics praised its direction and screenplay in dealing with issues related to feminism and patriarchy, as well as the acting, particularly of Cortellesi, Fanelli and Mastandrea. It received a leading 19 nominations at the 69th David di Donatello, and won 6 awards: Best New Director and Best Actress (for Cortellesi), Best Supporting Actress (for Fanelli), Best Original Screenplay, the David Youth Award and the David Audience Award.

== Plot ==
In post-war Rome, in May 1946, Allied military troops roam the streets in Jeeps. The city is experiencing both poverty and unrest fueled by the institutional referendum and the election of the Constituent Assembly on June 2 and 3.

Delia is the wife of Ivano and the mother of three children, including the teenage Marcella. Ivano physically and verbally abuses Delia, berating her efforts around the home, and decrying her intelligence. Between domestic engagements she nurses her sullen father-in-law Ottorino, does sewing and repairs for various city stores, and launders clothes for the wealthy. Delia's friends include Nino, a car mechanic who loves her; Marisa, a market greengrocer and witty optimist who encourages Delia to leave her husband; and William, an African American soldier who wants to help her. She is also acquainted with four fellow housewives, Franca, Giovanna, Rosa, and Elvira, who see that Delia is a victim of abuse, and feel empathy for her, but do not feel that they are able to act. Nino is forced to close his garage due to financial circumstances, and asks Delia to run away with him. After William gives Delia chocolate bars as an act of friendship, Ivano compares her to a sex worker, and viciously abuses her. Marcella frequently asks Delia to leave Ivano, but Delia explains that she will not be able to support herself. Ottorino complains to Ivano that his abusive treatment of Delia is disrupting his peace, advising him to be less frequent in his usage of physical violence; Ottorino suggests that Delia is becoming accustomed to Ivano's abuse, and that, in turn, she will become less obedient.

Delia's life is happily disrupted by Marcella's engagement to Giulio Moretti, the young scion of a well-to-do family who owe their prosperity to their local ice-cream parlor, despite rumours that the Morettis obtained their wealth through collaboration with the Germans during the Second World War. Ivano is aware of the financial gain a marriage between the two could bring. After a Sunday lunch Delia prepared for her daughter's future in-laws, who react derisively to her efforts, and the bossy and controlling behaviour of Giulio towards Marcella, she realises that her daughter is headed for a similarly abusive marriage. With William's help, she blows up her future son-in-law's bar establishment so that his parents will see their wealth disappear and leave town, causing Ivano to break off the engagement. Marcella is devastated, but Delia knows she has done the right thing. Delia has decided that she will fight back against her inferior status by voting in the constitutional referendum, after receiving her first voter card. Delia has also saved 8000 Lire from her work, hidden from her husband, which she originally intended use to buy a wedding dress for Marcella. Instead, after the engagement collapses, Delia gives the money to Marcella to fund her further education, which had been initially denied by Ivano.

On June 2, when the time comes to vote between the monarchy and the republic and to elect the Constituent Assembly, Delia wants to participate and looks for an excuse to escape her husband, but the sudden death of her father-in-law complicates her life as she sees her house filled with relatives and friends. This does not prevent her from going to the polls the next day, her first experience of this alongside many other Italian women. Delia unknowingly loses her card in her house before heading to the polls - it is found first by Ivano and then by Marcella, both of whom pursue Delia. Marcella gives the document to Delia and she is able to vote. Ivano attempts to intimidate Delia and to dissuade her from voting, but she demonstrates defiance after exercising her democratic right. Delia and Marcella exchange a knowing smile in return.

== Cast ==
- Paola Cortellesi as Delia
- Valerio Mastandrea as Ivano Santucci
- Romana Maggiora Vergano as Marcella Santucci
- Emanuela Fanelli as Marisa
- Giorgio Colangeli as Sor Ottorino Santucci
- Vinicio Marchioni as Nino
- Francesco Centorame as Giulio Moretti
- Lele Vannoli as Alvaro
- Paola Tiziana Cruciani as Sora Franca
- Yonv Joseph as William
- Alessia Barela as Orietta
- Federico Tocci as Mario Moretti
- Priscilla Micol Marino as Sora Giovanna
- Maria Chiara Orti as Sora Rosa
- Silvia Salvatori as Sora Elvira
- Mattia Baldo as Sergio
- Gianmarco Filippini as Franchino
- Gabriele Paolocà as Peppe

== Production ==
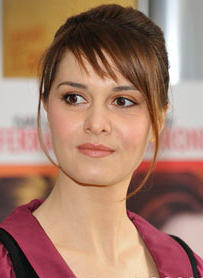
Film screenwriter, director and lead actress Paola Cortellesi, in 2009.

The film was conceived by Paola Cortellesi, who co-wrote the screenplay with Furio Andreotti and Giulia Calenda, based on the lives of women after the Italian campaign in World War II, inspired by the lives of Cortellesi's grandmother and great-grandmother.

The film was produced by Mario Gianani and Lorenzo Gangarossa for Wildside and Vision Distribution. The film was shot in Testaccio, Rome, with interior settings shot at Cinecittà Studios. In an interview with The Hollywood Reporter Roma, Cortellesi explained the decision to set the film in Rome:

"It was a natural decision. The story of the film is fictional, but there is a lot of my family's stories. I am half Roman and half Abruzzese. My mother came to Rome when she was six years old and spent her very early childhood here. But many of the stories I drew inspiration from are from my grandmother. It is also the reason why I imagined the work in black and white. When you are reminded of images from the past in Rome, they are never in color. The Roman courtyards where everything was put on the square. People lived together, there was no discretion, however, it was beautiful. The Rome of There's Still Tomorrow is very far from the Rome of today. [...] Social life was different. Maybe the bourgeois families were the only discreet ones. [...] and we staged a total incommunicability, which represents the difference in social class in Rome, as in the rest of Italy. Rome, however, is not just a basin. Rome is many things. There is the Rome of the center, the Rome of the well-to-do neighborhoods, then there is the popular Rome, the Rome of the suburbs, of the borgate"

== Release ==
The film premiered as the opening film at the Rome Film Festival 2023, it was released in Italian theaters on October 26, 2023.

Among the international theatrical distribution, the movie was released in the United Kingdom and Ireland by Vue International on April 26, 2024, in Australia and New Zealand by Limelight Distribution on 24 October and 28 November respectively, and in the United States by Greenwich Entertainment on March 7, 2025.

== Reception ==
=== Box office ===
There's Still Tomorrow debuted with €1.6 million on its first weekend, finishing on top of the Italian box office and marking the highest opening weekend for an Italian production in 2023. The film surpassed €20 million on 23 November, becoming the highest-grossing Italian film since the start of the COVID-19 pandemic passing Il grande giorno (2022) by Aldo, Giovanni & Giacomo and the highest-grossing film ever directed by a female Italian director. With €32.4 million it became the highest-grossing film in Italy in 2023 surpassing Barbie, the most successful film of the year by number of tickets sold, and the ninth highest-grossing film ever in the country, beating Life Is Beautiful (1997) by Roberto Benigni.

=== Critical response ===
On the review aggregator website Rotten Tomatoes, 89% of 38 critics' reviews are positive, with an average rating of 7.4/10. Metacritic, which uses a weighted average, assigned the film a score of 59 out of 100, based on 5 critics, indicating "mixed or average" reviews.

The film received positive reviews from Italian and international film critics, who appreciated its direction and screenplay in addressing issues related to feminism and patriarchy, as well as the acting skills of the actors, especially Cortellesi herself, Valerio Mastandrea, and Romana Maggiora Vergano.

Paolo Mereghetti, reviewing the film for Il Corriere della Sera, wrote that Cortellesi's work is "decidedly remarkable" as the directorial choices "try to find an unobvious balance between a realistic key and a more exemplary and didactic one," finding that some solutions have "naiveté" are "a consequence of the ambition and originality put into the field." The critic claimed that the film aims to "broaden the discourse of Delia and the other women toward a dimension that is no longer just individual but finally collective and social," and that although the film deals with themes "of violence and mistreatment," the project "never shows in its stark realism." Boris Sollazzo of The Hollywood Reporter Roma appreciated the director's ability to take "shots, especially the more emphatic and paroxysmal ones, in a counterintuitive way, to emphasize normality, of a walk or a fight," while the cinematography and editing come across as "as abrupt as it should be, retracing an even visual language of the time, albeit with modern faces and some directorial solutions."

Alessandro De Simone of Ciak also wrote that the film sets itself on the comedy genre with a "courageous contamination between musical Italian neorealism and postmodernism" and "veering at one point almost toward giallo." The journalist noted that although it does not turn out to be all balanced, the script "brings a higher cinematic level" to the project, appreciating "the comic timing and all the performances," especially by Emanuela Fanelli, Paola Tiziana Cruciani, and "the surprise, beautiful" Romana Maggiori Vergani. Dwelling on the themes addressed by the film, Luisa Garribba Rizzitelli of HuffPost italia associated it with the terms "unveiling" and "self-determination," believing that it presents "something revolutionary and full of hope" since it is not addressed "to women [...], but turning to mates, brothers, fathers, [who] can only mirror themselves in the sequence of merciless episodes: the male overpower spoiled by the privileges of the still patriarchal culture." Rizzitelli affirmed that Cortellesi "is showing them not a past time, but the mirror of what is still there today" by imposing in the film's finale "precisely on men, to decide which side they are on, determining, their position with respect to the struggles of feminism."

In a four out of five-star review, Peter Bradshaw of The Guardian wrote that the film is a "storytelling with terrific confidence and panache", which "pays homage to early pictures by Vittorio De Sica and Federico Fellini" through "a piece of narrative sleight-of-hand that borders on magic-neorealism, performed with shameless theatrical flair and marvellously composed in luminous monochrome". Jonathan Romney of Financial Times described the film as "a thoughtful, emotionally satisfying, immensely entertaining one-off, with an ending that smartly dynamites our expectations", prizing Davide Leone cameraworks and Cortellesi direction which "pulls some clever, sometimes risky tricks, shifting between melodrama, farce and some uncomfortable heightened moments". In his review, Screen International critic Allan Hunter paired the film to the classic Italian neorealism cinema, and described it as "an unashamed, old-fashioned melodrama [which] develops into a more considered tale of small victories on the road to female empowerment."

=== Accolades ===
Award	Date of ceremony	Category	Nominee(s)	Result	Ref.
Ciak d'oro	October 29, 2023	Superciak d'Oro Award	Paola Cortellesi	Won	
Ciak d'oro	October 29, 2023	Best Lead Actor	Valerio Mastandrea	Nominated	
Ciak d'oro	October 29, 2023	Best Reveleation of the Year	Romana Maggiora Vergano	Nominated	
Ciak d'oro	October 29, 2023	Best Playbill	There's Still Tomorrow's playbill	Won	
David di Donatello Awards	May 3, 2024	Best Film	There's Still Tomorrow	Nominated	
David di Donatello Awards	May 3, 2024	David Audience Award	There's Still Tomorrow	Won	
David di Donatello Awards	May 3, 2024	Best New Director	Paola Cortellesi	Won	
David di Donatello Awards	May 3, 2024	Best Actress	Paola Cortellesi	Won	
David di Donatello Awards	May 3, 2024	David Youth Award	Paola Cortellesi	Won	
David di Donatello Awards	May 3, 2024	Best Original Screenplay	Furio Andreotti, Giulia Calenda and Paola Cortellesi	Won	
David di Donatello Awards	May 3, 2024	Best Producer	Mario Gianani and Lorenzo Gangarossa	Nominated	
David di Donatello Awards	May 3, 2024	Best Actor	Valerio Mastandrea	Nominated	
David di Donatello Awards	May 3, 2024	Best Supporting Actress	Emanuela Fanelli	Won	
David di Donatello Awards	May 3, 2024	Best Supporting Actress	Romana Maggiora Vergano	Nominated	
David di Donatello Awards	May 3, 2024	Best Supporting Actor	Giorgio Colangeli	Nominated	
David di Donatello Awards	May 3, 2024	Best Supporting Actor	Vinicio Marchioni	Nominated	
David di Donatello Awards	May 3, 2024	Best Cinematography	Davide Leone	Nominated	
David di Donatello Awards	May 3, 2024	Best Score	Lele Marchitelli	Nominated	
David di Donatello Awards	May 3, 2024	Best Sound	Filippo Porcari, Alessandro Feletti, Luca Anzellotti, and Paolo Segat	Nominated	
David di Donatello Awards	May 3, 2024	Best Production Design	Paola Comencini and Fiorella Cicolini	Nominated	
David di Donatello Awards	May 3, 2024	Best Costumes	Alberto Moretti	Nominated	
David di Donatello Awards	May 3, 2024	Best Make-up	Ermanno Spera	Nominated	
David di Donatello Awards	May 3, 2024	Best Hairstyling	Teresa Di Serio	Nominated	
Gothenburg Film Festival	January 26, 2024	Dragon Award Best International Film	There's Still Tomorrow	Won	
Rome Film Festival	October 29, 2023	Progressive Cinema Award	There's Still Tomorrow	Won	
Rome Film Festival	October 29, 2023	Audience Award	There's Still Tomorrow	Won	
Rome Film Festival	October 29, 2023	Best First Feature Award	Paola Cortellesi	Won	
Sydney Film Festival	June 16, 2024	Sydney Film Prize	There's Still Tomorrow	Won	
Norwegian International Film Festival	August 23, 2024	Audience Award	There's Still Tomorrow	Won	
Norwegian International Film Festival	August 23, 2024	Eurimages Audentia Award	There's Still Tomorrow	Won	
38th Golden Rooster Awards	November 15, 2025	Best Foreign Language Film	There's Still Tomorrow	Won	
Robert Awards	January 31, 2026	Best Non-English Language Film	Paola Cortellesi	Nominated	
