= Everybody Loves Diamonds =

Italian television series

- Promotional release poster
- Genre: Heist; drama
- Based on: Antwerp diamond heist
- Written by: Bernardo Pellegrini; Giulio Carrieri; Michele Astori; Stefano Bises
- Directed by: Gianluca Maria Tavarelli
- Starring: Kim Rossi Stuart; Anna Foglietta; Rupert Everett
- Composer: Ralf Hildenbeutel
- Country of origin: Italy
- Original language: Italian
- No. of seasons: 1
- No. of episodes: 8

Production
- Executive producer: Olivia Sleiter
- Producers: Mario Gianani; Lorenzo Gangarossa
- Cinematography: Marco Pieroni
- Editor: Alessandro Heffler
- Camera setup: Multi-camera
- Running time: 50 minutes
- Production companies: Amazon MGM Studios; Menuetto Film; Wildside

Original release
- Network: Amazon Prime Video
- Release: October 13, 2023

Everybody Loves Diamonds is an Italian television series directed by Gianluca Maria Tavarelli. Produced by Menuetto Film and Wildside, in association with Amazon Studios and starring Kim Rossi Stuart, Anna Foglietta and Rupert Everett. It premiered on Amazon Prime Video on October 13, 2023.

== Cast ==
- Kim Rossi Stuart as Leonardo Notarbartolo
- Anna Foglietta as Anna
- Gianmarco Tognazzi as Ghigo
- Carlotta Antonelli as Sandra
- Leonardo Lidi as Alberto
- Rupert Everett as John Lovegrove
- Synnøve Macody Lund as Judith DeWitt, director of the World Diamond Center
- Malcolm McDowell
- Johan Heldenbergh as Albert Mertens, police inspector, head of the Diamond Police
- Eric Godon

== Production ==
It is based on the Antwerp diamond heist (2003). In July 2022, Rupert Everett, Malcolm McDowell joined the cast, with Issam Dakka joining the cast the following month.

The series was announced on Amazon Prime Video.

== Reception ==
Nadeem Abdul gave the series a rating of two and a half stars out of five in his review for The Envoy Web. In his review for The Review Geek, Greg Wheeler rated the series a 7.5 out of 10 stars.

The series was reviewed by various other media publications, such as Cineuropa and Decider.

== See also ==
- List of Amazon Prime Video original programming
