= Bang Bang Baby (TV series) =

2022 Italian television series

- Genre: Crime drama
- Created by: Andrea Di Stefano
- Based on: L'intoccabile by Marisa Merico
- Written by: Andrea Di Stefano: Valentina Gaddi; Sebastiano Melloni
- Directed by: Michele Alhaique: Giuseppe Bonito; Margherita Ferri
- Starring: Arianna Becheroni: Adriano Giannini; Antonio Gerardi; Dora Romano; Giuseppe De Domenico; Giorgia Arena; Lucia Mascino
- Composer: Santi Pulvirenti
- Country of origin: Italy
- Original language: Italian
- No. of series: 1
- No. of episodes: 10

Production
- Executive producer: Simone Gattoni
- Producers: Francesco Tatò: Luchino Visconti di Modrone; Mario Gianani; Lorenzo Mieli
- Cinematography: Daria D'Antonio: Vittorio Omodei Zorini; Timoty Aliprandi; Francesco di Pierro
- Production companies: The Apartment Pictures; Wildside

Original release
- Network: Amazon Prime Video
- Release: 28 April 2022 – present

Bang Bang Baby is a 2022 Italian crime drama television series created by Andrea Di Stefano and directed by Michele Alhaique, Giuseppe Bonito and Margherita Ferri. It was internationally released on Prime Video on 28 April 2022.

== Cast ==
- Arianna Becheroni as Alice Barone
- Adriano Giannini as Santo Maria Barone
- Antonio Gerardi as Nereo Ferraù
- Dora Romano as Guendalina "Lina" Barone
- Giuseppe De Domenico as Rocco Cosentino
- Giorgia Arena as Assunta Ferraù
- Lucia Mascino as Gabriella Giammatteo

== Release ==
The series had its world premiere at the 2022 Canneseries competing for the Long Form.
