= Virginia Raffaele =

Italian comedian, actress, impersonator, and presenter (born 1980)

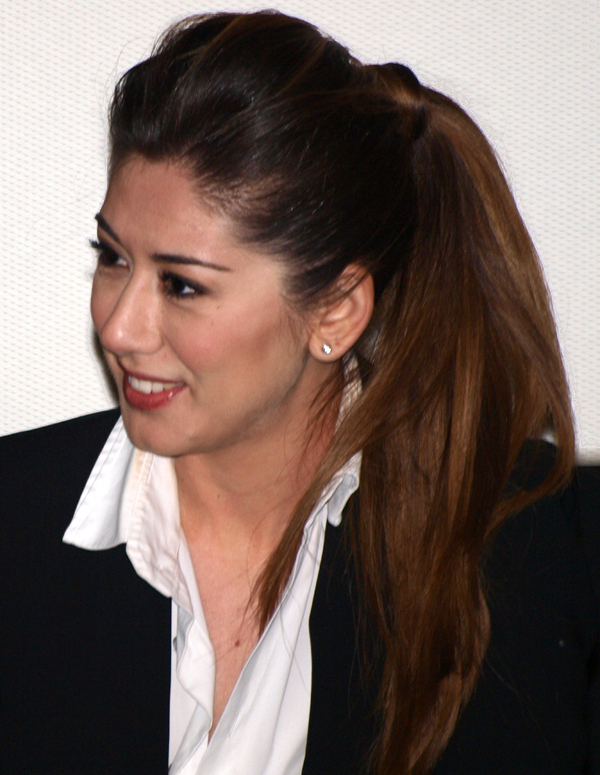
- Raffaele in 2012
- Born: 27 September 1980 (age 45); Rome, Italy
- Occupations: Comedian, actress, impersonator
- Height: 174 cm (5 ft 9 in)

Virginia Raffaele (born 27 September 1980) is an Italian comedian, actress, impersonator and presenter.

== Life and career ==
Born in Rome, the daughter of two circus performers of Sinti origins, Raffaele studied classical and modern dance at the Accademia nazionale di danza and in 1999 graduated at the Accademia Teatro Integrato directed by Pino Ferrara.

Raffaele started her career on stage, often working as a sidekick of the comedy duo Lillo & Greg. After her television debut as a correspondent in the Rai 2 program Quelli che... il Calcio, she became first known for her imitations and parodies in the Italia 1 show Mai dire Grande Fratello Show. She then appeared in several other shows, including Victor Victoria, Striscia la notizia, two episodes of Le invasioni barbariche and Amici. She also appeared as an actress in several films and TV-series.

After appearing as a guest at the 65th edition of the Sanremo Music Festival, Raffaele was chosen to co-host the 66th and 69th editions.

In 2025, her film Life Goes This Way will open the 20th Rome Film Festival on 15 October 2025.

== Filmography ==
Films
Year	Title	Role	Notes
2004	Ladri di barzellette	Casting actress	Cameo appearance
2005	Romanzo Criminale	Nicolino's girlfriend	
2011	Faccio un salto all'Avana	Annaclara	
2012	Love Is in the Air	Juanita	
2013	The Fifth Wheel	Mara	
2014	Big Hero 6	Aunt Cass	Italian dub; voice role
2014	A Woman as a Friend	Patrizia	
2019	The Addams Family	Morticia Addams	Italian dub; voice role
2021	The Addams Family 2	Morticia Addams	Italian dub; voice role
2023	Tre di troppo	Giulia	
2023	My Summer with the Shark	Rita	
2024	“Un Mondo a Parte”; Agnese		
2025	La vita va così (Life goes this way)	Francesca	Comedy-drama

Television
Year	Title	Role	Notes
2005	Bla Bla Bla	Herself/ Performer	Variety show; 15 episodes
2005	Il maresciallo Rocca	Virginia	Episode: "Il male ritorna"
2006–2007	NormalMan	Mrs. Cassani	Main role; 22 episodes
2008	Domenica in	Herself/ Guest	Talk show
2009	L'onore e il rispetto	Herself	Episode: "Quarto episodio"
2009–2010	Victor Victoria	Herself/ Guest	Talk show
2010–2013	Quelli che... il Calcio	Herself/ Performer	Variety show
2012	2012 Concerto del Primo Maggio	Herself	Concert
2013	2013 MTV Awards (MTV Italia)	Herself/ Host	Event
2013	Striscia la notizia	Herself/ Guest	Variety show
2015–2016	Amici di Maria De Filippi	Herself/ Special guest	Talent show
2016	2016 Sanremo Music Festival	Herself/ Co-host	Annual music festival
2016	Dov'è Mario?	Marika	Episode: "Secondo episodio"
2016	Stasera Casa Mika	Herself/ Guest	Musical show
2018	Come quando fuori piove	Gregoria	Main role; 6 episodes
2022	LOL - Chi ride è fuori	Herself	Contestant (season 2)
2024	Colpo di luna	Herself/ Host	Variety show
