= Life Goes This Way =

2025 Italian comedy film by Riccardo Milani

- Theatrical release poster
- Italian: La vita va così
- Directed by: Riccardo Milani
- Written by: Riccardo Milani; Michele Astori
- Produced by: Mario Gianani; Lorenzo Mieli; Sonia Rovai
- Starring: Diego Abatantuono; Virginia Raffaele; Aldo Baglio; Geppi Cucciari
- Cinematography: Saverio Guarna; Simona D'Onofrio
- Edited by: Patrizia Ceresani; Francesco Renda
- Music by: Moses Concas
- Production companies: Wildside; Our Films; PiperFilm
- Distributed by: Medusa Film
- Release dates: 15 October 2025 (Rome); 23 October 2025 (Italy)
- Running time: minutes
- Country: Italy
- Language: Italian
- Box office: €7,078,947

Life Goes This Way (Italian: La vita va così) is a 2025 Italian comedy-drama film co-written and directed by Riccardo Milani. Starring Virginia Raffaele, Diego Abatantuono, and Aldo Baglio, the film "inspired by a story that has traveled the world and ended up on international headlines," was selected as the opening film of the 20th Rome Film Festival and screened out of competition on 15 October 2025 in the Grand Public section.

A week after its festival premiere, the film was released in the Italian cinemas on 23 October 2025.

== Synopsis ==
The narrative of film is a humorous and passionate tale set over a twenty-year period, in the region of Sardinia. It explores the experiences of a local community grappling with tensions between economic development and the preservation of their land and cultural identity.

== Cast ==
- Diego Abatantuono as Giacomo
- Virginia Raffaele as Francesca
- Aldo Baglio as Mariano
- Ignazio Giuseppe Loi as Efisio
- Geppi Cucciari as judge
- Ignazio Mulas

== Production ==
The film was inspired by the life of Sardinian shepherd Ovidio Marras, who died in January 2024 at the age of 93. Marras garnered national and international attention for opposing a high-profile tourist development that endangered one of Italy's last untouched coastlines.

The film written by Riccardo Milani and Michele Astori, is produced by Mario Gianani, Lorenzo Mieli and Sonia Rovai with Medusa Film and Wildside as co-distributors.

Filming began in Cagliari with shooting taking place in the Teulada, Sardinia commune in the south-west region in February 2025. The film was completed on 4 August 2025.

== Release ==
Life Goes This Way opened the 20th Rome Film Festival on 15 October 2025. On 23 October 2025, it was released in Italian cinemas by Medusa Film.

The film will be screened at the Warsaw International Film Festival on 13 October 2026.

== Reception ==
=== Box office ===
The film was released on 23 October 2025 on 650 screens throughout Italy. It opened at the top of the Italian box office with €124,994.

As of 16 September 2026 the film has collected €7,078,947 from 1,032,594 admission in Italy.

=== Critical response ===
Vittoria Scarpa in her review for Cineuropa, describes the film both as "a story about a Sardinian shepherd against the world" and a portrait of a divided community grappling with tensions between economic survival and environmental preservation. She notes that the film depicts a setting where "the State is all but absent," local institutions are easily swayed, and justice is embodied by a locally born judge, whose brief appearance is nonetheless "swift but significant" and ultimately just. Scarpa criticized the film's pacing and structure, observing that its nearly two-hour runtime feels repetitive. Although the narrative spans a decade, she finds that "the characters and settings remain pretty much the same," and that comedic elements of Aldo Baglio occasionally feel out of place. While she considers these shortcomings "fairly trivial," and adds that "you don't expect them from a director of Riccardo Milani's calibre, who's now on his 16th feature film."
