= Lorenzo Mieli =

Italian film and television producer (born 1973)

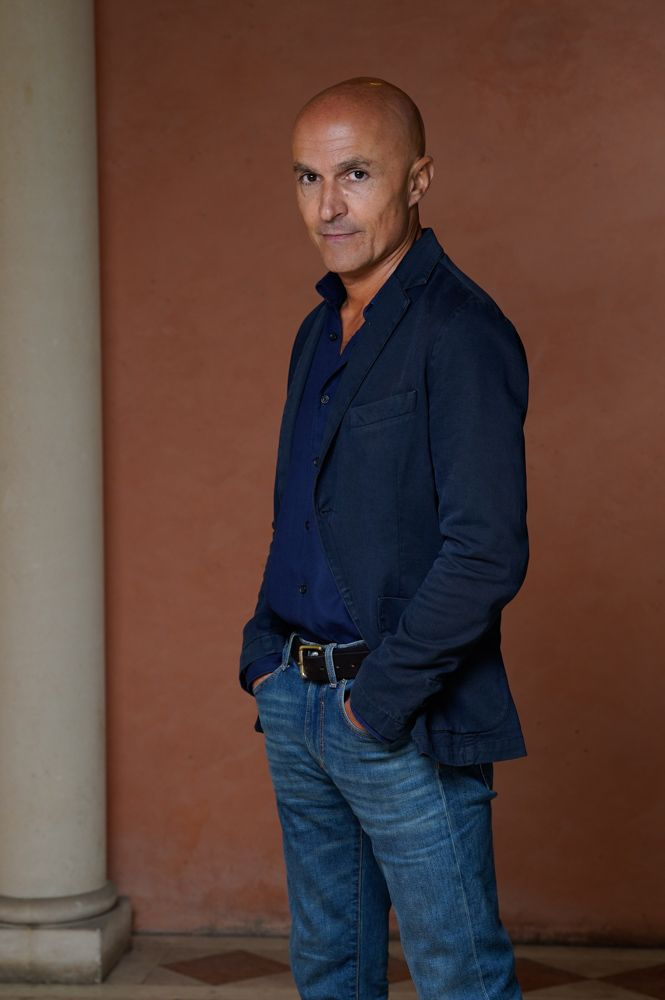
- Mieli in 2025
- Born: 15 April 1973 (age 53); Rome, Italy
- Occupations: Film producer; Television producer; studio executive
- Parents: Paolo Mieli (father); Francesca Socrate (mother)

Lorenzo Mieli (born 15 April 1973) is an Italian film producer, entrepreneur and television producer.

== Filmography ==
=== Film ===
Year	Film	Director
2011	Boris: The Film	Giacomo Ciarrapico; Luca Vendruscolo; Mattia Torre
2012	Love Is in the Air	Fausto Brizzi
2012	Me and You	Bernardo Bertolucci
2012	True Love	Enrico Clerico Nasino
2013	The Mafia Kills Only in Summer	Pif
2013	Pazze di me	Fausto Brizzi
2013	A Street in Palermo	Emma Dante
2013	Guess Who's Coming for Christmas?	Fausto Brizzi
2014	Hungry Hearts	Saverio Costanzo
2014	Misunderstood	Asia Argento
2014	Me Romantic Romani	Giacomo Ciarrapico; Luca Vendruscolo; Mattia Torre
2015	La solita commedia: Inferno	Fabrizio Biggio; Francesco Mandelli; Martino Ferro
2015	You Can't Save Yourself Alone	Sergio Castellitto
2015	God Willing	Edoardo Falcone
2015	Vacanze ai Caraibi	Neri Parenti
2016	Forever Young	Fausto Brizzi
2016	At War with Love	Pif
2016	Poveri ma ricchi	Fausto Brizzi
2016	Mom or Dad?	Riccardo Milani
2017	It's All About Karma	Edoardo Falcone
2017	Like a Cat on a Highway	Riccardo Milani
2019	Pavarotti	Ron Howard
2019	If Only	Ginevra Elkann
2020	Figli	Giuseppe Bonito
2020	The Hand of God	Paolo Sorrentino
2021	America Latina	Damiano and Fabio D'Innocenzo
2021	On Our Watch	Pif
2022	Belli ciao	Gennaro Nunziante
2022	Bones and All	Luca Guadagnino
2022	Dry	Paolo Virzì
2023	Adagio	Stefano Sollima
2023	Priscilla	Sofia Coppola
2023	Enea	Pietro Castellitto
2023	Holiday	Edoardo Gabbriellini
2023	I Told You So	Ginevra Elkann
2024	Challengers	Luca Guadagnino
2024	Queer	Luca Guadagnino
2024	Maria	Pablo Larrain
2024	Parthenope	Paolo Sorrentino
2025	Life Goes This Way (La vita va così)	Riccardo Milani
2026	Fatherland	Paweł Pawlikowski
2026	Making Marie Antoinette	Eleanor Coppola

=== Television ===
Year(s)	TV Series	Creator	Director(s)	Notes
2008-2022	Boris	Luca Manzi	Davide Marengo; Giacomo Ciarrapico; Luca Vendruscolo; Mattia Torre	Producer
2013	In Treatment		Saverio Costanzo	Executive Producer
2016	The Young Pope	Paolo Sorrentino	Paolo Sorrentino	Executive Producer
2019-	My Brilliant Friend	Saverio Costanzo	Daniele Luchetti; Saverio Costanzo; Alice Rohrwacher	Executive producer
2020	Homemade		various	Producer
2020	We Are Who We Are	Luca Guadagnino	Luca Guadagnino	Executive Producer
2021	The New Pope	Paolo Sorrentino	Paolo Sorrentino	Executive producer
2021	Exterior Night		Marco Bellocchio	Executive Producer
2022-	Bang Bang Baby	Andrea Di Stefano	Giuseppe Bonito; Margherita Ferri; Michele Alhaique	Producer
2024	Supersex		Matteo Rovere (ep. 1, 4, 6), Francesco Carrozzini (ep. 3, 7) e Francesca Mazzoleni (ep. 2, 5)	Executive Producer
2025-	M. Son of the Century		Joe Wright	Producer
2025	The Monster of Florence	Leonardo Fasoli and Stefano Sollima	Stefano Sollima	Producer

== Awards and nominations ==
Year	Awards	Category	Work	Result	Ref(s)
1996-1997	Premio N.I.C.E. Città di Firenze	Short film award	Ciao amore	Won	
2008	Roma Fiction Fest	Best producer	Boris	Won	
2014	David di Donatello	Best producer	The Mafia Kills Only in Summer	Nominated	
2014	Nastro d'Argento	Best producer	The Mafia Kills Only in Summer	Nominated	
2014	Ciak d'Oro	Best producer	The Mafia Kills Only in Summer	Nominated	
2019	Nastro d'Argento	Best producer	My Brilliant Friend	Nominated	
2021	Nastro d'Argento	Best producer	The New Pope	Nominated	
2022	Academy Award	Best International Feature Film	The Hand of God	Nominated	
2022	Nastro d'Argento	Best producer	The Hand of God	Nominated	
2022	Nastro d'Argento	Best film	The Hand of God	Won	
