= Vision Distribution =

Italian film distribution company

Vision Distribution S.p.A.
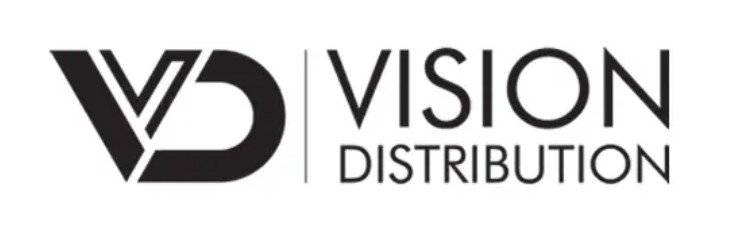
- Industry: Entertainment
- Founded: 2016; 10 years ago
- Headquarters: Rome, Italy
- Products: Motion pictures
- Services: Film distribution
- Owner: Sky Italia (Sky Group); Cattleya (ITV Studios); Wildside (Fremantle); Lucisano Media Group; Palomar (Mediawan)
- Divisions: Vision Distribution International

Vision Distribution is an Italian film distribution company. Sky Italia holds a majority stake. It is based in Rome.

== History ==
Vision Distribution was formed in 2016 as a joint venture between Sky Italia and production companies Cattleya (ITV Studios), Wildside (Fremantle), Lucisano Media Group, Palomar and Indiana Production. Vision Distribution reached an agreement with Universal Pictures to handle the Italian physical distribution of their films. At the 2020 Berlinale's European Film Market, the company launched an international sales subsidiary, Vision Distribution International.

In 2023, Vision co-produced and distributed Paola Cortellesi's There's Still Tomorrow (C'è ancora domani), a black-and-white feminist comedy-drama. It was the most successful film at the Italian box office in 2023, and nominally the 10th highest-grossing film in the country's history.

In December 2023, The Hollywood Reporter Roma reported that Vision Distribution had become one of the top distributors in the country, rivaling RAI's 01 Distribution and Mediaset's Medusa Film.

In December 2025, Indiana Production exited the Vision Distribution joint venture by relinquishing its 8% stake.
