= A World Apart (2024 film) =

2024 film

- Theatrical release poster
- Italian: Un mondo a parte
- Directed by: Riccardo Milani
- Written by: Riccardo Milani
- Starring: Antonio Albanese; Virginia Raffaele
- Distributed by: Medusa Film
- Release date: 28 March 2024
- Running time: 113 minutes
- Country: Italy
- Language: Italian

A World Apart (Italian: Un mondo a parte) is a 2024 Italian comedy-drama film written and directed by Riccardo Milani. The film won two Nastro d'Argento Awards, for best comedy film and best actress in a comedy film (Virginia Raffaele).

== Plot ==
Teacher Michele Cortese (Antonio Albanese) is transferred from Rome to a school in Marsica (Abruzzo) which is on the brink of closure due to lack of enrollment.
