= Paola Cortellesi =

Italian actress and singer (born 1973)

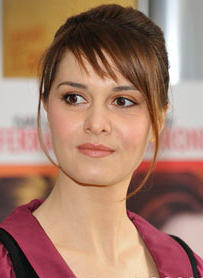
- Cortellesi in 2009
- Born: 24 November 1973 (age 52); Rome, Italy
- Occupations: Actress; filmmaker; musician
- Years active: 1996–present

Paola Cortellesi (Italian pronunciation: [ˈpaːola kortelˈleːzi, -eːsi]; born 24 November 1973) is an Italian actress, filmmaker and musician. A prolific actress, her career spanned between film, stage and television. In 2023, she made her directorial debut with the critical acclaimed black-and-white feminist comedy-drama film There's Still Tomorrow, which became one of the highest-grossing films of all time in Italy, receiving the Nastro d'Argento for Best Film, and five David di Donatello, including Best Directional Debut, Best Original Screenplay, Best Actress as well a nomination for Best Film.

== Biography ==
Cortellesi debuted in the show business at the age of 13, as a singer for Cacao meravigliao, the jingle of the popular RAI TV show Indietro tutta! by Renzo Arbore. At 19 she began studying as an actress at the "Teatro Blu" in Rome (the same theatre school that Kim Rossi Stuart, Gianmarco Tognazzi, Claudia Gerini, Stefania Rocca, and Claudio Santamaria, among others, have attended).

She began her career in television with the show Macao, presented by Alba Parietti, but eventually reached nationwide popularity as a comic actress in the TV show Mai dire Gol by the Gialappa's Band (2000), which, in particular, showcased her skills at parodying famous people, a genre where she collected some of her most appreciated performances (the latest one being her parody of Milan's mayor Letizia Moratti in the 2010–2011 edition of the popular TV show Zelig).

After Mai dire Gol, Cortellesi has collaborated in several other TV Show of the Mai dire... franchise by Gialappa's Band. Other major performances of Cortellesi on television include the 2004 edition of the Sanremo Music Festival and the leading role in the TV movie Maria Montessori: Una vita per i bambini, a biography of Maria Montessori, for which Cortellesi received the "Maximo Award" at the Roma Fiction Fest.

Her career in cinema includes several appreciated performances in comedies and comic movies, including a leading role in Do You Know Claudia?, a very popular production starring the comic trio Aldo, Giovanni & Giacomo. In 2008, she was nominated for the David di Donatello award for Best Supporting Actress for her role in the movie Piano, solo by Riccardo Milani. In 2011 she won the David di Donatello for Best Actress for her leading role in Escort in Love.

One of her most appreciated theatrical performances was Gli ultimi saranno gli ultimi ("Last will be last") by Massimiliano Bruno, which has been staged 189 times from 2005 to 2007 in over 50 theatres, and for which Cortellesi has collected a number of awards.

As a singer, Cortellesi has been described by Mina as "one of the best Italian voices" and has cooperated with several notable Italian musicians, including Elio e le Storie Tese, Renato Zero, Claudio Baglioni, Frankie Hi-NRG MC, and Neri per Caso. In 2019 she was filmed in the title role of Petra for the four-part Italian TV crime drama, broadcast from September 2020.

In 2023 her directorial debut There's Still Tomorrow (C'è ancora domani) was a major hit. It was the most successful film at the Italian box office in 2023, and the 10th highest-grossing film in the country's history. It was the opening film at the 18th Rome Film Festival, at the 69th David di Donatello it brought Cortellesi 6 awards, including the Best Actress and Best Original Screenplay.

In 2025, Cortellesi was appointed the jury president of the Progressive Cinema Competition at the 20th Rome Film Festival.

== Personal life ==
Cortellesi married director Riccardo Milani on 1 October 2011, after being engaged for nine years. The couple have a daughter, Laura, born in 2013.

== Filmography ==
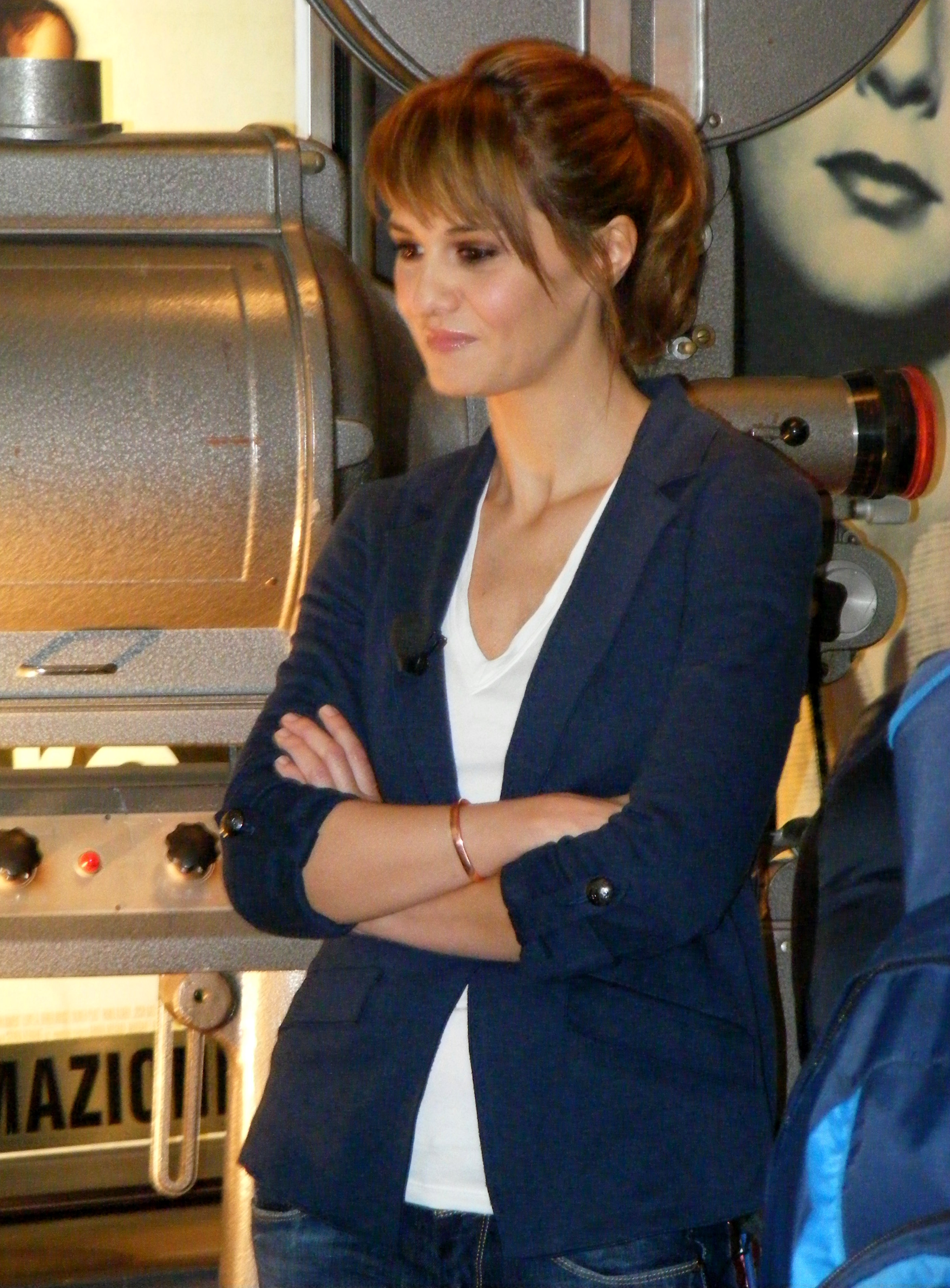
Paola Cortellesi

=== Film ===
Year	Title	Role(s)	Notes
1999	The King and I	Anna Leonowens (voice)	Italian singing voice
2000	Ask Me If I'm Happy	Dalia	
2001	Amarsi può darsi	Rita	
2001	Se fossi in te	Caterina	
2002	A cavallo della tigre	Antonella	
2002	Stuart Little 2	Margalo (voice)	Italian voice
2002	Bell'amico	Damiana	
2003	Past Perfect	Claudia	
2003	The Soul's Place	Nina	
2004	Do You Know Claudia?	Claudia	
2004	Natale a casa DeeJay	Silvana	
2006	Don't Make Any Plans for Tonight	Cinzia	
2007	Persepolis	Marjane (voice)	Italian voice
2007	Piano, solo	Baba	
2009	The Physics of Water	Giulia	
2009	Turtle: The Incredible Journey	Narrator	Documentary
2009	The Ladies Get Their Say	Sofia	
2010	Men vs. Women	Chiara	
2011	Women vs. Men	Chiara	
2011	Escort in Love	Alice Bottini	
2011	Cars 2	Holley Shiftwell (voice)	Italian voice
2014	A Boss in the Living Room	Cristina D'Avola	
2014	Do You See Me?	Serena Bruno	Also co-writer
2014	Sotto una buona stella	Luisa Tombolini	
2015	Wondrous Boccaccio	Badessa Usimbalda	
2015	The Little Prince	Mother (voice)	Italian voice
2015	The Last Will Be the Last	Luciana Colacci	Also co-writer
2016	Qualcosa di nuovo	Lucia	Also co-writer
2017	Mom or Dad?	Valeria Mozzati	Also co-writer
2017	Like a Cat on a Highway	Monica	Also co-writer
2018	Early Man	Goona (voice)	Italian voice
2018	The Legend of the Christmas Witch	Paola Sostegni / Christmas Witch	
2019	Detective per caso	Inspector Bellamore	
2019	Don't Stop Me Now	Giovanna Salvatori	Also co-writer
2020	Figli	Sara	
2020	Soul	22 (voice)	Italian voice
2021	22 vs. Earth	22 (voice)	Italian voice
2021	Like a Cat on a Highway 2	Monica	Also co-writer
2022	Marcel!	Jewels Seller	Cameo
2023	There's Still Tomorrow	Delia	Also director, writer and producer

=== Television ===
Year	Title	Role(s)	Notes
2007	Maria Montessori – Una vita per i bambini	Maria Montessori	Two-parts television movie
2010	Tutti pazzi per amore	God	Episode: "Almeno tu nell'universo"
2010	Le cose che restano	Nora	4 episodes
2020–present	Petra	Petra Delicato	Lead role; also co-writer
2023	Call My Agent - Italia	Herself	Episode: "Paola"
2026	Peccato	Herself	Mokumentary series; recurring role

== Writings ==
- Gianluca Maria Tavarelli; Paola Cortellesi; Massimo Poggio; Gianmarco Tognazzi, Alberto Cracco (2006). Maria Montessori: [una] vita per i bambini. Erscheinungsort nicht ermittelbar: Taodue. OCLC 819807992. (both a book and a film)

== Accolades ==
Award	Year	Category	Nominated work	Result	Ref.
Associazione Nazionale dei Critici di Teatro	2006	Critics' Award	Gli ultimi saranno ultimi	Won	
Bari International Film Festival	2019	Best Actress	Figli	Won	
Ciak d'oro	2011	Personality of the Year	Herself	Won	
Ciak d'oro	2018	Best Actress	Like a Cat on a Highway	Won	
Ciak d'oro	2018	Best Screenplay	Like a Cat on a Highway	Nominated	
Ciak d'oro	2020	Best Actress	Figli	Won	
Ciak d'oro	2021	Best Actress	Like a Cat on a Highway 2	Nominated	
Ciak d'oro	2023	Golden SuperCiak	There's Still Tomorrow	Won	
David di Donatello	2008	Best Supporting Actress	Piano, solo	Nominated	
David di Donatello	2011	Best Actress	Escort in Love	Won	
David di Donatello	2014	Best Actress	Sotto una buona stella	Nominated	
David di Donatello	2015	Best Actress	Do You See Me?	Nominated	
David di Donatello	2016	Best Actress	The Last Will Be the Last	Nominated	
David di Donatello	2018	Best Actress	Like a Cat on a Highway	Nominated	
David di Donatello	2021	Best Actress	Figli	Nominated	
David di Donatello	2024	Best Film	There's Still Tomorrow	Nominated	
David di Donatello	2024	Best New Director	There's Still Tomorrow	Won	
David di Donatello	2024	Best Original Screenplay	There's Still Tomorrow	Won	
David di Donatello	2024	Best Actress	There's Still Tomorrow	Won	
David di Donatello	2024	David Giovani	There's Still Tomorrow	Won	
David di Donatello	2024	Audience Award	There's Still Tomorrow	Won	
Federazione Italiana Cinema d'Essai	2007	Best Actress	Piano, solo	Won	
Flaiano Award	2014	Best Movie Actress	A Boss in the Living Room	Won	
Flaiano Award	2023	Best TV Actress	Petra	Won	
Globo d'oro	2011	Best Actress	Escort in Love	Nominated	
Globo d'oro	2018	Best Actress	Like a Cat on a Highway	Won	
Globo d'oro	2023	Best Film	There's Still Tomorrow	Won	
Hystrio Award	2007	Best Actress	Piano, solo	Won	
Kinéo Award	2018	Honorary Award	Herself	Won	
Le Maschere Awards	2006	Best Monologue	Gli ultimi saranno ultimi	Won	
Nastro d'Argento	2002	Best Supporting Actress	Se fossi in te	Nominated	
Nastro d'Argento	2009	Best Supporting Actress	The Ladies Get Their Say	Nominated	
Nastro d'Argento	2011	Best Actress	Escort in Love	Nominated	
Nastro d'Argento	2014	Best Actress	Sotto una buona stella	Nominated	
Nastro d'Argento	2015	Best Actress	Do You See Me?	Nominated	
Nastro d'Argento	2015	Nino Manfredi Award	Do You See Me?	Won	
Nastro d'Argento	2016	Best Actress	The Last Will Be the Last	Nominated	
Nastro d'Argento	2018	Best Comedy Actress	Like a Cat on a Highway	Won	
Nastro d'Argento	2019	Best Comedy Actress	Don't Stop Me Now	Won	
Nastro d'Argento	2020	Best Comedy Actress	Figli	Won	
Nastro d'Argento	2024	Film of the Year	There's Still Tomorrow	Won	
Rome Film Festival	2020	Women in Cinema Award	Figli	Won	
Rome Film Festival	2023	Jury's Progressive Cinema Special Award	There's Still Tomorrow	Won	
Rome Film Festival	2023	Best First Work – Special Mention	There's Still Tomorrow	Won	
Rome Film Festival	2023	Audience Special Award	There's Still Tomorrow	Won	
Taormina Film Fest	2014	Taormina Arte Award	Herself	Won	
