= List of 2023 box office number-one films in Italy =

The following is a list of 2023 box office number-one films in Italy.

== Number-one films ==
†	This implies the highest-grossing movie of the year.

#	Weekend end date	Film	Gross	Notes	Ref.
1	8 January 2023	Avatar: The Way of Water	US$5,283,108		
2	15 January 2023	Avatar: The Way of Water	US$2,373,540		
3	22 January 2023	Me contro Te – Il film: Missione giungla	US$2,503,718		
4	29 January 2023	Me contro Te – Il film: Missione giungla	US$1,129,033		
5	5 February 2023	The Banshees of Inisherin	US$765,484		
6	12 February 2023	Titanic (2023 Re-release)	US$876,116		
7	19 February 2023	Ant-Man and the Wasp: Quantumania	US$2,567,393		
8	26 February 2023	Ant-Man and the Wasp: Quantumania	US$1,188,938		
9	5 March 2023	Creed III	US$3,180,608		
10	12 March 2023	Creed III	US$1,544,252		
11	19 March 2023	Scream VI	US$1,478,654		
12	26 March 2023	John Wick: Chapter 4	US$2,252,933		
13	2 April 2023	John Wick: Chapter 4	US$1,140,052		
14	9 April 2023	The Super Mario Bros. Movie	US$6,234,300		
15	16 April 2023	The Super Mario Bros. Movie	US$4,250,701		
16	23 April 2023	The Super Mario Bros. Movie	US$1,924,058		
17	30 April 2023	The Super Mario Bros. Movie	US$1,228,770		
18	7 May 2023	Guardians of the Galaxy Vol. 3	US$4,166,643		
19	7 May 2023	Guardians of the Galaxy Vol. 3	US$2,641,733		
20	21 May 2023	Fast X	US$6,893,367		
21	28 May 2023	The Little Mermaid	US$4,686,613		
22	4 June 2023	The Little Mermaid	US$3,164,717		
23	11 June 2023	Spider-Man: Across the Spider-Verse	US$1,006,894		
24	18 June 2023	The Flash	US$1,315,878		
25	25 June 2023	Elemental	US$1,612,629		
26	2 July 2023	Indiana Jones and the Dial of Destiny	US$2,191,114		
27	9 July 2023	Indiana Jones and the Dial of Destiny	US$1,079,834		
28	16 July 2023	Mission: Impossible – Dead Reckoning Part One	US$1,900,000		
29	23 July 2023	Barbie	US$8,585,116	Barbie had the highest weekend debut of 2023.	
30	30 July 2023	Barbie	US$5,982,596		
31	6 August 2023	Barbie	US$3,464,159		
32	13 August 2023	Barbie	US$1,394,107		
33	20 August 2023	Barbie	US$952,892		
34	27 August 2023	Oppenheimer	US$7,442,137		
35	3 September 2023	Oppenheimer	US$5,239,257		
36	10 September 2023	Oppenheimer	US$2,779,668		
37	17 September 2023	A Haunting in Venice	US$2,162,816		
38	24 September 2023	A Haunting in Venice	US$2,171,838		
39	1 October 2023	A Haunting in Venice	US$985,433		
40	8 October 2023	The Exorcist: Believer	US$1,262,124		
41	15 October 2023	Taylor Swift: The Eras Tour	US$784,525		
42	22 October 2023	Me contro Te – Il film: Vacanze in Transilvania	US$2,039,566		
43	29 October 2023	There's Still Tomorrow †	US$1,737,753		
44	5 November 2023	There's Still Tomorrow †	US$3,770,368		
45	12 November 2023	There's Still Tomorrow †	US$4,810,000	There's Still Tomorrow is the only film that saw an increase in both the second and third week in 2023.	
46	19 November 2023	There's Still Tomorrow †	US$4,450,853		
47	26 November 2023	There's Still Tomorrow †	US$3,534,332		
48	3 December 2023	There's Still Tomorrow †	US$2,312,019		
49	10 December 2023	There's Still Tomorrow †	US$1,670,911	There's Still Tomorrow is the first film since Titanic in 1998 to top the box office for seven consecutive weeks.	
50	17 December 2023	Wonka	US$3,395,722		
51	24 December 2023	Wonka	US$1,636,047		
52	31 December 2023	Wish	US$2,165,913		

== Highest-grossing films of 2023 ==
Highest-grossing films of 2023 (In-year release)
Rank	Title	Distributor	Domestic gross
1.	There's Still Tomorrow	Vision	$40,632,735
2.	Barbie	Warner Bros.	$33,902,557
3.	Oppenheimer	Universal	$31,063,516
4.	The Super Mario Bros. Movie	Universal	$22,040,273
5.	Wonka	Warner Bros.	$16,020,662
6.	The Little Mermaid	Disney	$13,147,408
7.	Fast X	Universal	$12,727,005
8.	Guardians of the Galaxy Vol. 3	Disney	$11,972,926
9.	Wish	Disney	$10,679,550
10.	A Haunting in Venice	Disney	$9,295,298

== See also ==
- List of 2022 box office number-one films in Italy
- 2023 in Italy

Preceded by 2022 Box office number-one films	Box office number-one films 2023	Succeeded by 2024 Box office number-one films
