= Pavarotti (film) =

2019 UK-US documentary film

- Theatrical release poster
- Directed by: Ron Howard
- Written by: Mark Monroe
- Produced by: Brian Grazer; Ron Howard; Nigel Sinclair; Michael Rosenberg; Jeanne Elfant Festa
- Edited by: Paul Crowder
- Production companies: PolyGram Entertainment; Decca Records; Imagine Entertainment; White Horse Pictures
- Distributed by: CBS Films (United States); Entertainment One (United Kingdom); HanWay Films (International)
- Release dates: June 7, 2019 (United States); July 15, 2019 (United Kingdom)
- Running time: 114 minutes
- Countries: United States; United Kingdom
- Language: English
- Box office: US$6.5 million

Pavarotti is a 2019 documentary film directed by Ron Howard about Italian operatic tenor Luciano Pavarotti. The film had a nationwide premiere event through Fathom Events on June 4, 2019, and was released in theaters on June 7, 2019. Pavarotti is an American-British venture, with CBS Films and HanWay Films serving as distributors.

== Synopsis ==
The documentary opens with Pavarotti, an established star opera tenor, in the Amazon jungle insisting on seeing the stage where Enrico Caruso once performed to open a new theatre house. Pavarotti wants to sing on the stage where Caruso once performed. The old theatre is temporarily opened for him, and he sings a short aria on the stage. The documentary then returns to his hometown of Modena, Italy, where Pavarotti was born to a poor middle-class family. His father is a local baker and his mother a housekeeper. As a teenager, Pavarotti becomes a member of the same choir to which his father belongs. He continues to develop his voice with hopes of becoming an accomplished singer.

When he auditions for his first major role, Pavarotti singles himself out by his ability to hit a high C with command and authority during his performance. After the audition, he is cast in an opera that allows him to hit the high C several times. Pavarotti's reputation begins to expand and he becomes known as the "King of the High C's". He performs with sopranos of world renown such as Joan Sutherland and Mirella Freni and also launches a recording career.

When he hears that his friend, fellow tenor José Carreras, is in the hospital for treatment of leukemia, Pavarotti calls him to wish him to get well so that Carreras can return as a genuine competitor at the caliber of world class tenors. Carreras completes his leukemia treatment successfully and goes to New York for a recovery period. There Pavarotti, Carreras, and Placido Domingo happen to be staying at the same hotel for a period of time with the Metropolitan Opera season underway. A promoter hears of the three of them staying at the same hotel, and knowing that they are all soccer fans, suggests to them that he could arrange for a concert on the eve of the World Cup Final, where the three of them could perform in the same venue. They enthusiastically agree.

The Three Tenors concert, with Zubin Mehta conducting, takes place in Rome in 1990 to a capacity audience. It is recorded for world-wide DVD distribution, and the Three Tenors are a breakthrough success. Their playful singing of "’O sole mio" becomes a stand-out hit, with Carreras and Domingo echoing Pavarotti's signature trills from his repetition of the song's opening lyrics. The three also improvise on the stage a three tenors version of "Nessun dorma" as a finale. They reunite for subsequent concerts at the next three World Cup finals and ultimately perform more than 30 concerts.

The recorded version of the 1990 concert becomes the best-selling classical music album of all time, outselling established rock star acts on the top Billboard 100 lists. Carreras' career is relaunched, and Pavarotti continues his career as one of the outstanding tenors of the twentieth century. He trends more and more to perform in large solo concerts rather than operas.

The documentary also describes his many girlfriends and affairs, which ultimately led to his divorce from his longtime wife Adua in 2000. In 2003 he married his former personal assistant Nicoletta Mantovani. In 2007 he was admitted to hospital for treatment of pancreatic cancer. On September 6, he died of complications of pancreatic cancer in his own bedroom in his hometown of Modena.

== Production ==
The film was produced with the cooperation of Luciano Pavarotti's estate using family archives, interviews, and live music footage.

In addition to directing the documentary, Ron Howard served as a producer alongside Brian Grazer, Nigel Sinclair, Michael Rosenberg, and Jeanne Elfant Festa. David Blackman and Dickon Stainer served as executive producers.

=== Soundtrack ===
An official soundtrack album, Pavarotti: Music from the Motion Picture, was released worldwide on digital download and CD on June 7, 2019, by Decca Records. It features twenty-two tracks of studio and live recordings.

== Release ==
On February 10, 2019, the first trailer for the film was shown at the 61st Annual Grammy Awards, promoting an American theatrical release on June 7, 2019, by CBS Films. The film was released in the UK on July 15, 2019, through Entertainment One Films.

=== Home media ===
The film was released through Lionsgate in the United States as a Blu-ray Disc, DVD and digital set on September 24, 2019 and by Universal Pictures separately in the United Kingdom on November 25.

Chart (2019)	Peak position
Irish Music DVD Chart (IRMA)	1
U.S. Music Video Sales (Billboard)	2
UK Official Music Video Chart (OCC)	1

== Reception ==
=== Box office ===
As of October 7, 2019, Pavarotti has grossed $4.7 million in the United States and Canada, and $1.8 million in other territories, for a total worldwide gross of $6.5 million.

In 2023, Deadline listed Pavarotti at #18 on its ranking of the top 20 highest-grossing concert films of all time (domestic).

==== United States and Canada ====
In the United States and Canada, Pavarotti made $144,032 in its opening weekend from 19 theaters in 17 cities. The film made $221,207 in its second weekend, finishing twentieth, and $431,140 in its third; a 95% increase finishing sixteenth for a box office total of $1,014,228.

In its fourth weekend, the film made $553,067 across 288 theaters, finishing seventeenth in the week ending June 30. In its eighth weekend of release, the film had decreased to 135 theaters. It made $85,156 at 94 screenings in its ninth weekend for a total of $4,425,534.

==== United Kingdom ====
In the United Kingdom, the film grossed £30,456 from 42 cinemas in its second weekend, a per-screen average of £725 and 92% decrease from the first week, finishing twenty-third with a total gross of £492,763 ($610,157) at the box office. It made another £25,197 ($30,646) on 48 screens in its third weekend and £14,015 ($16,857) in its fourth on 27 screens, grossing a total of £601,010 ($722,889) on the week ending August 11. As of 15 September 2019, the film went on to gross £705,400 on its ninth week.

==== Other territories ====
In New Zealand, the film was released on June 13, 2019, through Madman Entertainment, grossing $46,260 in its opening weekend across 50 screens, finishing eighth at the box office. Over nine weeks, it has grossed a total of $391,659. The film also grossed $295,236 in Poland, $49,641 in Portugal, $46,087 in Russia, $22,030 in Slovakia, and $10,191 in the United Arab Emirates as of August 11, 2019.

=== Critical response ===
On review aggregator Rotten Tomatoes, the film holds an approval rating of 87% based on 86 reviews, with an average rating of 6.9/10. The website's critical consensus reads, "Pavarotti pays entertaining tribute to a towering cultural figure with a documentary whose evident affection for its subject proves contagious." On Metacritic, the film has a weighted average score of 66 out of 100, based on 20 critics, indicating "generally favorable reviews".

CBS News said the "new documentary about Pavarotti soars like his legendary voice". USA Today said the film "serves as a vivid reminder of just how huge a role the great tenor Luciano Pavarotti played for a generation" and that "the passionate way the infectiously beaming, Hawaiian shirt-loving opera star lived his life is the most enchanting element of Pavarotti". The New York Times said "If Luciano Pavarotti ever had a bad day, you wouldn't know it from Pavarotti, an upbeat film that recounts the singer's life, or at least its better moments." On the other hand, NPR said the film "misses all the right notes", adding "Pavarotti feels like a missed chance to tell a good story". The Washington Post described the documentary as "terrible but timely", a "mediocre film, imperfect and annoying", that opera lovers should nevertheless watch.

== See also ==
- 2019 in film
- High C – Pavarotti has been referred to as the "King of the High C's"
- The Three Tenors
