= Riccardo Milani =

Italian film director and screenwriter

- Born: 15 April 1958 (age 68); Rome, Italy
- Occupations: Director; Screenwriter

Riccardo Milani (born 15 April 1958) is an Italian film and television director and screenwriter.

== Life and career ==
Born in Rome, Milani began his career in 1985, as assistant director of Mario Monicelli in Let's Hope It's a Girl.

After being assistant of Nanni Moretti, Florestano Vancini and Daniele Luchetti, in 1994 he made his feature film debut with the comedy-drama Auguri professore. In 2001 he made his television debut, directing the miniseries Il sequestro Soffiantini. He is married to actress Paola Cortellesi. He's an atheist but he admires Christian values.

In 2025 his film Life Goes This Way will open the 20th Rome Film Festival on 15 October 2025.

== Filmography ==
=== Film ===
- Auguri professore (1997)
- The Anto War (1999)
- The Soul's Place (2003)
- Piano, solo (2007)
- Welcome Mr. President (2013)
- Do You See Me? (2014)
- Mom or Dad? (2017)
- Like a Cat on a Highway (2017)
- Don't Stop Me Now (2019)
- Like a Cat on a Highway 2 (2021)
- Corro da te (2022)
- Thank You Guys (2023)
- A World Apart (2024)
- Life Goes This Way (2025)

=== Television ===
- Tutti pazzi per amore (TV, 2008–2010)
- Atelier Fontana - Le sorelle della moda (TV, 2011)
