= 56th David di Donatello =

2011 Italian film awards

- Date: 6 May 2011
- Site: Auditorium Conciliazione, Rome, Italy
- Hosted by: Tullio Solenghi

Highlights
- Best Picture: We Believed
- Most awards: We Believed (7)
- Most nominations: We Believed (13)

The 56th David di Donatello ceremony, presented by the Accademia del Cinema Italiano, was held on 6 May 2011.

== Winners and nominees ==
Best Film: We Believed – directed by Mario Martone; Basilicata Coast to Coast – directed by Rocco Papaleo; Benvenuti al Sud – directed by Luca Miniero; La nostra vita – directed by Daniele Luchetti; A Quiet Life – directed by Claudio Cupellini	Best Producer: Tilde Corsi, Gianni Romoli, Claudio Bonivento – 20 Cigarettes; Isabella Cocuzza, Arturo Paglia, Mark Lombardo, Elisabetta Olmi – Basilicata Coast to Coast; Riccardo Tozzi, Marco Chimenz, Giovanni Stabilini, Francesca Longardi – Benvenuti al Sud; Angelo Barbagallo – The Salt of Life; Gregorio Paonessa, Marta Donzelli, Susanne Marian, Philippe Bober, Gabriella Manfrè, Elda Guidinetti, Andres Pfaeffli – Le quattro volte; Carlo Degli Esposti, Conchita Airoldi, Giorgio Magliulo – We Believed
Best Director: Daniele Luchetti – La nostra vita; Luca Miniero – Benvenuti al Sud; Paolo Genovese – The Immature; Saverio Costanzo – The Solitude of Prime Numbers; Michelangelo Frammartino – Le quattro volte; Mario Martone – We Believed; Marco Bellocchio – Sorelle Mai; Claudio Cupellini – A Quiet Life	Best New Director: Rocco Papaleo – Basilicata Coast to Coast; Aureliano Amadei – 20 Cigarettes; Edoardo Leo – 18 Years Later; Paola Randi – Into Paradiso; Massimiliano Bruno – Escort in Love
Best Actor: Elio Germano – La nostra vita; Claudio Bisio – Benvenuti al Sud; Vinicio Marchioni – 20 Cigarettes; Antonio Albanese – Qualunquemente; Kim Rossi Stuart – Angel of Evil	Best Actress: Paola Cortellesi – Escort in Love; Angela Finocchiaro – Benvenuti al Sud; Sarah Felberbaum – The Jewel; Isabella Ragonese – La nostra vita; Alba Rohrwacher – The Solitude of Prime Numbers
Best Supporting Actor: Giuseppe Battiston – La Passione; Raoul Bova – La nostra vita; Alessandro Siani – Benvenuti al Sud; Rocco Papaleo – Escort in Love; Francesco Di Leva – A Quiet Life	Best Supporting Actress: Valentina Lodovini – Benvenuti al Sud; Valeria De Franciscis – The Salt of Life; Claudia Potenza – Basilicata Coast to Coast; Barbora Bobuľová – Love & Slaps; Anna Foglietta – Escort in Love
David di Donatello for Best Screenplay: Mario Martone, Giancarlo De Cataldo – We Believed; Rocco Papaleo, Valter Lupo – Basilicata Coast to Coast; Paolo Genovese – The Immature; Sandro Petraglia, Stefano Rulli, Daniele Luchetti – La nostra vita; Filippo Gravino, Guido Iuculano, Claudio Cupellini – A Quiet Life	Best Cinematography: Renato Berta – We Believed; Vittorio Omodei Zorini – 20 Cigarettes; Luca Bigazzi – The Jewel; Fabio Cianchetti – The Solitude of Prime Numbers; Arnaldo Catinari – Angel of Evil
Best Production Design: Emita Frigato – We Believed; Francesco Frigeri – Amici miei – Come tutto ebbe inizio; Paola Comencini – Benvenuti al Sud; Paki Meduri – Into Paradiso; Tonino Zera – Angel of Evil	Best Score: Rita Marcotulli, Rocco Papaleo – Basilicata Coast to Coast; Umberto Scipione – Benvenuti al Sud; Teho Teardo – The Jewel; Fausto Mesolella – Into Paradiso; Hubert Westkemper – We Believed
Best Original Song: "Mentre dormi" from Basilicata Coast to Coast – Composed by Max Gazzè and Gimmi Santucci, performed by Max Gazzè; "L'amore non ha religione" from What a Beautiful Day – Composed and performed by Checco Zalone; "Immaturi" from The Immature – Composed and performed by Alex Britti; "Capocotta Dreamin'" from Escort in Love – Composed by Maurizio Filardo, performed by Massimiliano Bruno and Marco Conidi; "Qualunquemente" from Qualunquemente – Composed by Peppe Voltarelli, Salvatore De Siena, Amerigo Sirianni, Antonio Albanese, Piero Guerrera, performed by Antonio Albanese	Best Editing: Alessio Doglione – 20 Cigarettes; Mirco Garrone – La nostra vita; Jacopo Quadri – We Believed; Francesca Calvelli – Sorelle Mai; Consuelo Catucci – Angel of Evil
Best Sound: Bruno Pupparo – La nostra vita; Mario Iaquone – 20 Cigarettes; Francesco Liotard – Basilicata Coast to Coast; Paolo Benvenuti, Simone Paolo Olivero – Le quattro volte; Gaetano Carito, Maricetta Lombardo – We Believed	Best Costumes: Ursula Patzak – We Believed; Alfonsina Lettieri – Amici miei – Come tutto ebbe inizio; Nanà Cecchi – Christine Cristina; Francesca Sartori – La Passione; Roberto Chiocchi – Angel of Evil
Best Special Visual Effects: Rebel Alliance – 20 Cigarettes; CANECANE – Amici miei – Come tutto ebbe inizio; RESET VFX – Christine Cristina; Paola Trisoglio, Stefano Marinoni, Paola Randi, Daniele Stirpe Jost – Into Paradiso; Gianmario Catania, Corrado Virgili – Winx Club 3D: Magical Adventure	Best Make-up Artist: Vittorio Sodano – We Believed; Vincenzo Mastrantonio – Amici miei – Come tutto ebbe inizio; Lorella De Rossi – Gorbaciof; Gianfranco Mecacci – La Passione; Francesco Nardi, Matteo Silvi – Angel of Evil
Best Hairstylist: Aldo Signoretti – We Believed; Ferdinando Merolla – Amici miei – Come tutto ebbe inizio; Maurizio Tamagnini – Christine Cristina; Massimo Gattabrusi – The Solitude of Prime Numbers; Teresa Di Serio – Qualunquemente; Claudia Pallotti, Teresa Di Serio – Angel of Evil	Best Documentary Feature: A Boy Has Been Dead – directed by Filippo Vendemmiati; L'ultimo gattopardo: Ritratto di Goffredo Lombardo – directed by Giuseppe Tornatore; Ritratto di mio padre – directed by Maria Sole Tognazzi; This Is My Land... Hebron – directed by Stephen Natanson and Giulia Amati; Ward 54 – directed by Monica Maggioni
Best Short Film: Jody delle giostre – directed by Adriano Sforzi; Io sono qui – directed by Mario Piredda; Caffè Capo – directed by Andrea Zaccariello; Salvatore – directed by Bruno Urso and Fabrizio Urso; Stand By Me – directed by Giuseppe Marco Albano	Best European Film: The King's Speech – directed by Tom Hooper; Another Year – directed by Mike Leigh; The Secret in Their Eyes – directed by Juan José Campanella; In a Better World – directed by Susanne Bier; Of Gods and Men – directed by Xavier Beauvois
David Youth Award: 20 Cigarettes – directed by Aureliano Amadei; Benvenuti al Sud – directed by Luca Miniero; We Believed – directed by Mario Martone; Un altro mondo – directed by Silvio Muccino; Angel of Evil – directed by Michele Placido	Special David Awards: Ettore Scola, Career David; Claudio Bonivento, Career David
