= Campanian Archipelago =

Archipelago in the Tyrrhenian Sea in southwestern Italy

Coordinates: 40.6671°N 14.0955°E

The Campanian Archipelago (Italian: Arcipelago Campano), also called Neapolitan Archipelago (Arcipelago Napoletano), is an archipelago in the Tyrrhenian Sea, in southwestern Italy. It principally comprises 5 islands: Capri, Ischia, Nisida, Procida, and Vivara. Most of the archipelago belongs to the Metropolitan City of Naples (and previously part of the Province of Naples).

== Extent ==
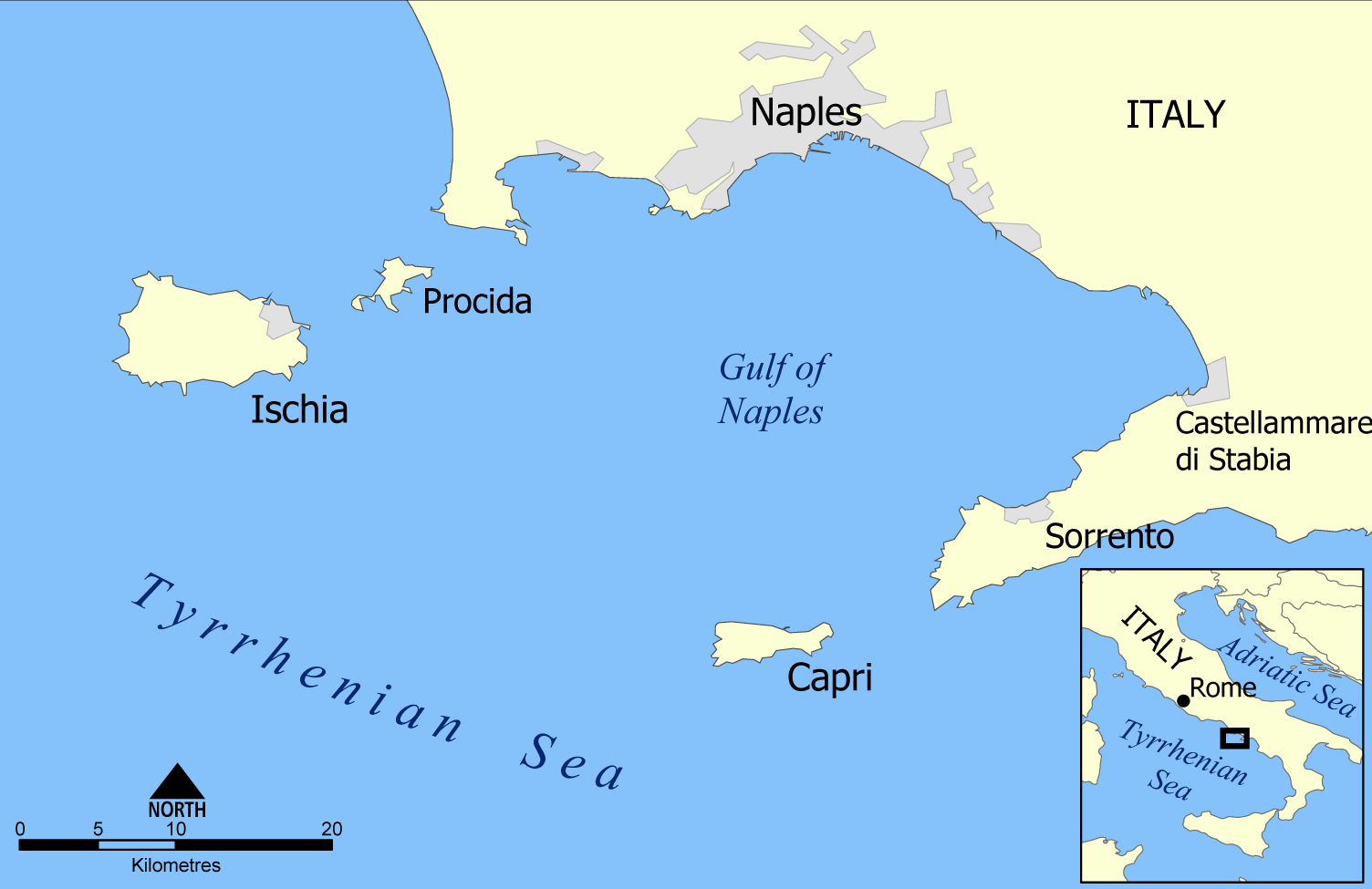
Map of the Campanian Archipelago

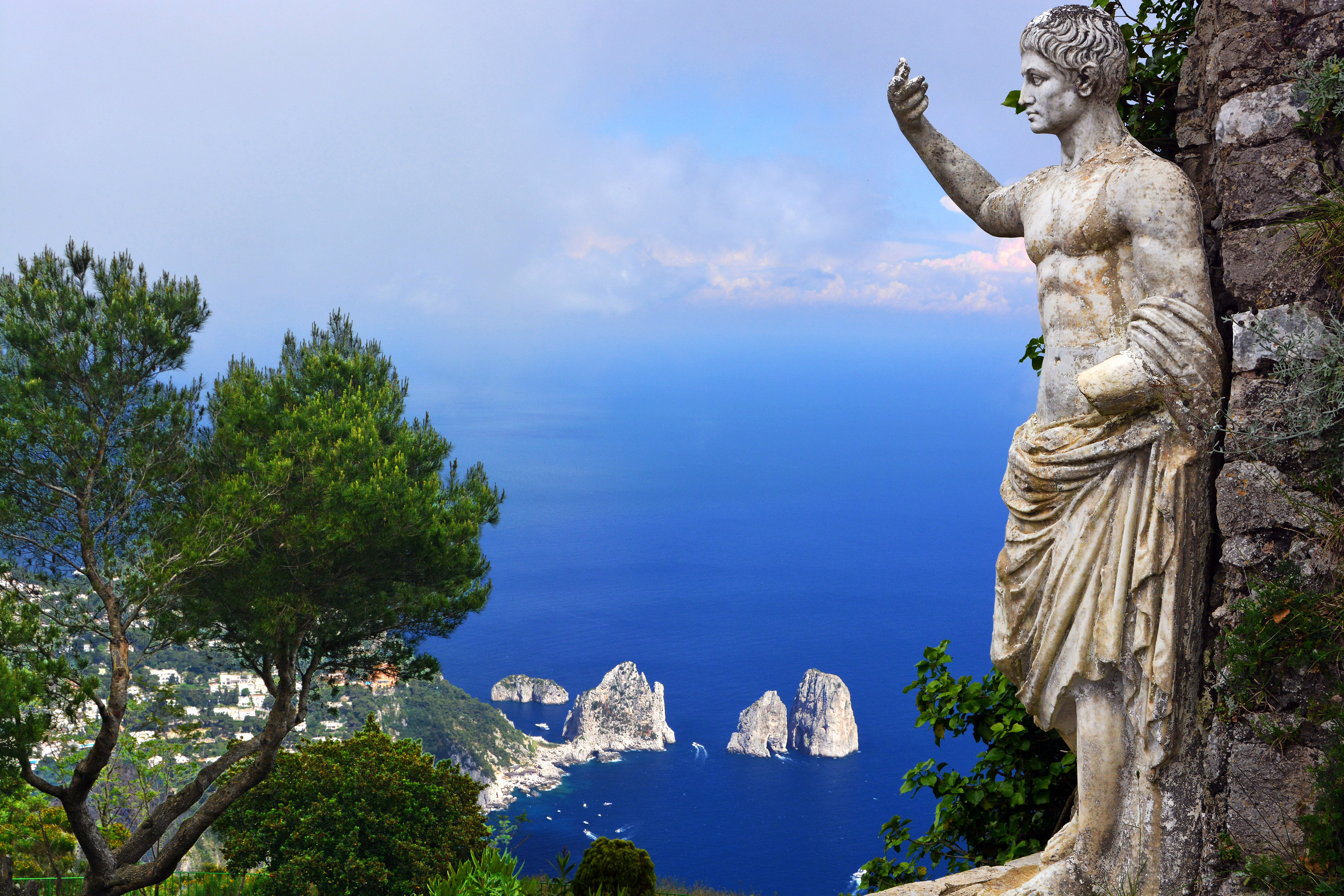
Statue of Augustus & Faraglioni rocks, Capri

The five principal islands are all administered by the Metropolitan City of Naples:

- Capri and
- the 4 Phlegraean Islands:
  - Ischia & its companion islet, the Aragonese Castle
  - Nisida,
  - Procida, and
  - Vivara.

Nearby islets and skerries are usually included in the archipelago as well:

- Aragonese Castle
- the Sirenuse (the Galli) & the nearby Vetara Skerry.
- Gaiola Island
- Megaride Islet,
- Pennata Island,
- the Capri faraglioni,
- San Martino Islet,
- Rovigliano Skerry.

Most of these minor islets belong to Naples as well, except the Sirenuse (Galli), which belong to the Province of Salerno.

== History ==
The ancient name of this archipelago was the Parthenopaean Islands (Isole Partenopee, from Parthenope, the ancient name of Naples). It originally included the Pontine Islands, which are now considered an archipelago in its own right.

Megaride Islet, home to Castel dell'Ovo, used to be an island – albeit very near the coastline – in this archipelago. However, it is now a peninsula attached directly to the mainland.

== Ecology ==
The archipelago is part of a major habitat for Mediterranean sperm whales and has been proposed as a marine mammal protected area as a result.

== Gallery ==
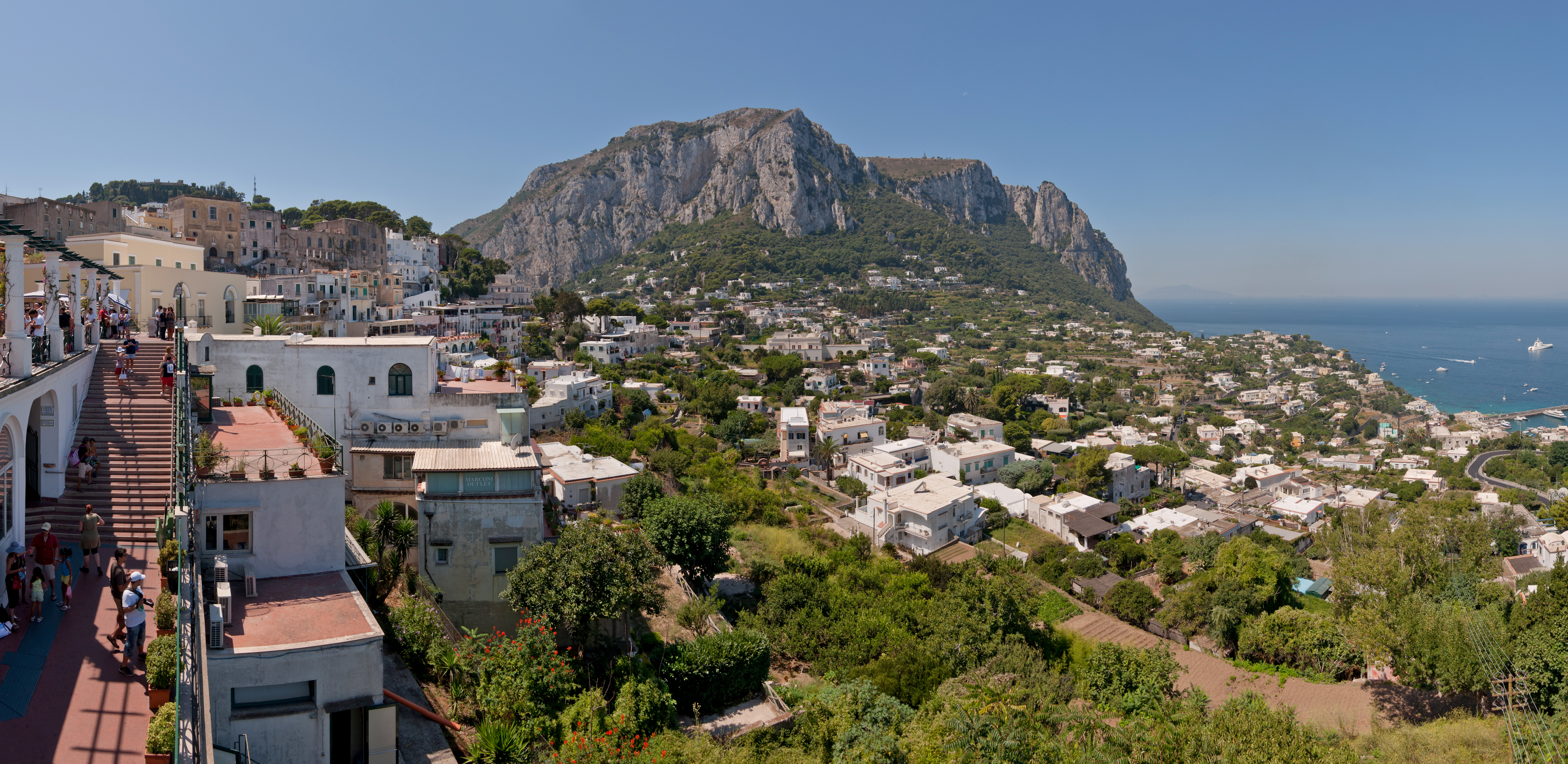
Capri Island

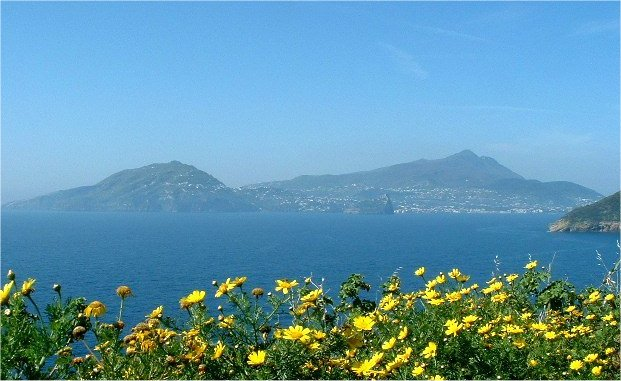
View of Ischia from Procida

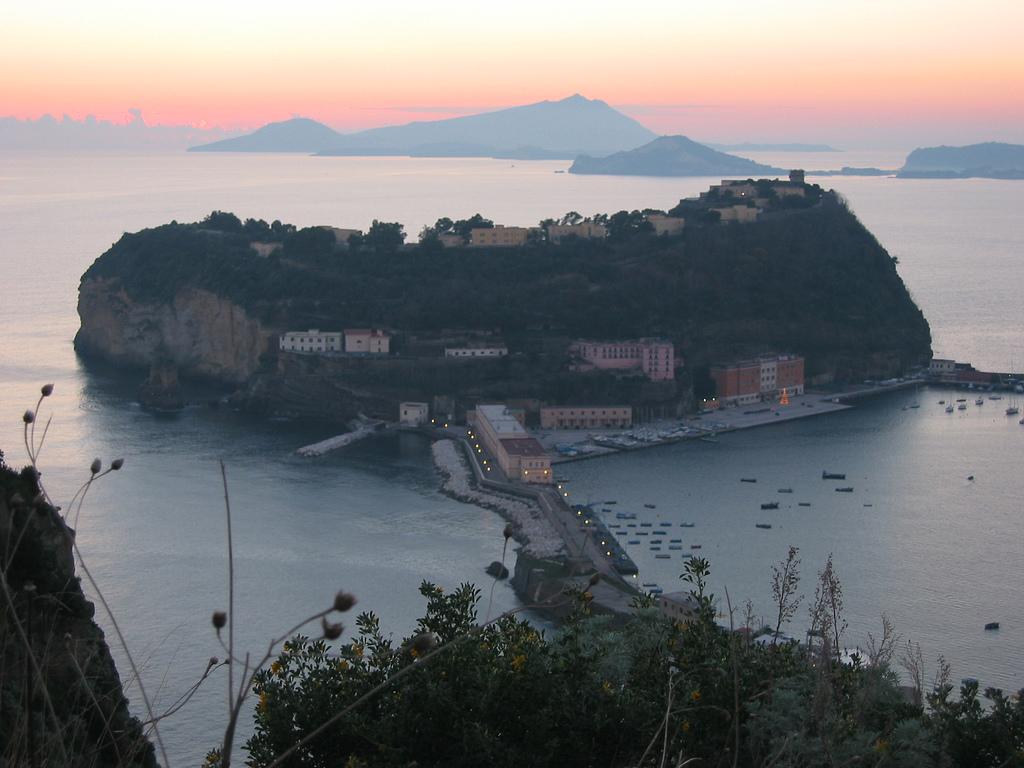
Isle of Nisida

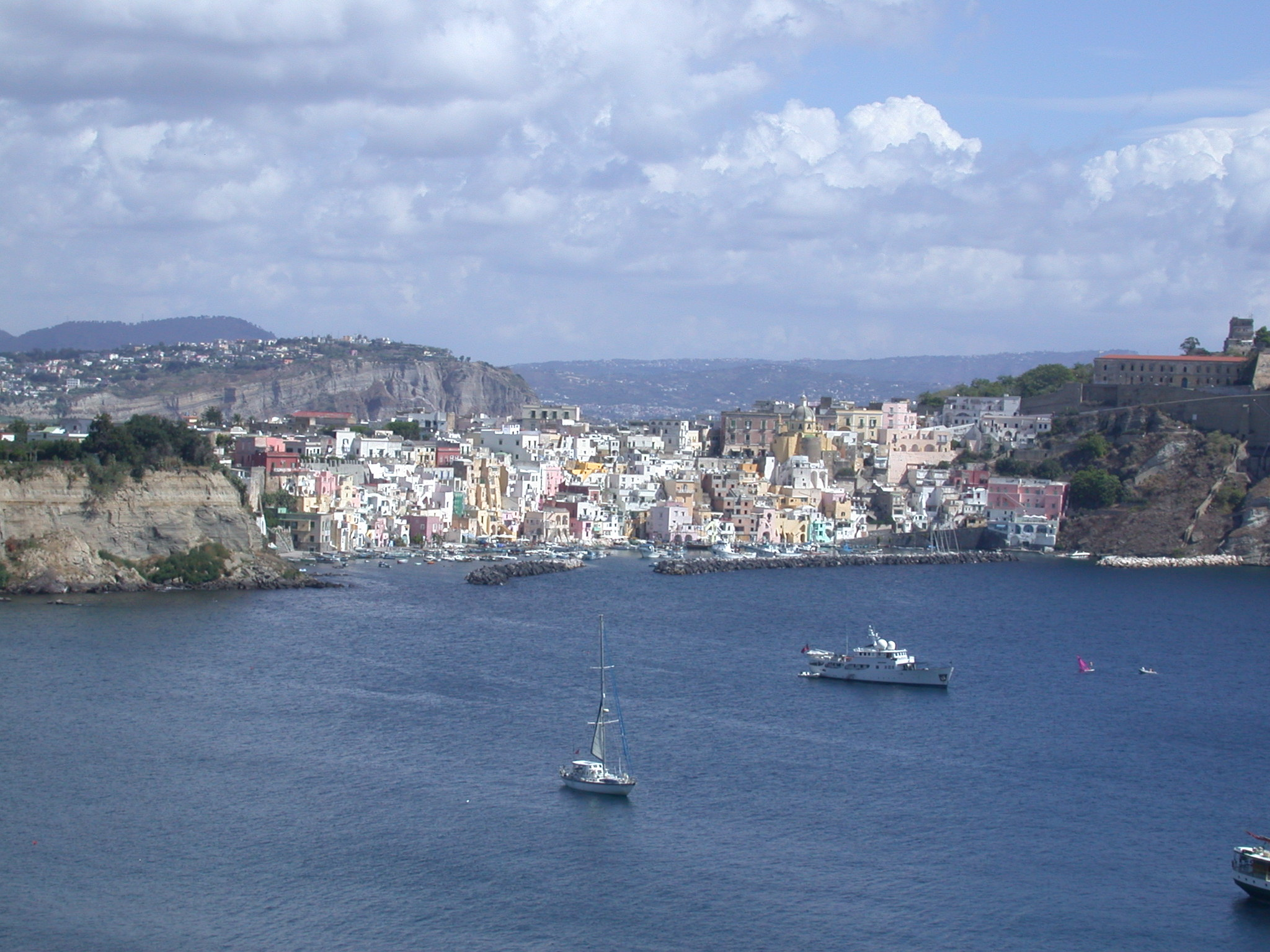
Harbor of Corricella, Procida Island (view from Cape Pizzaco)

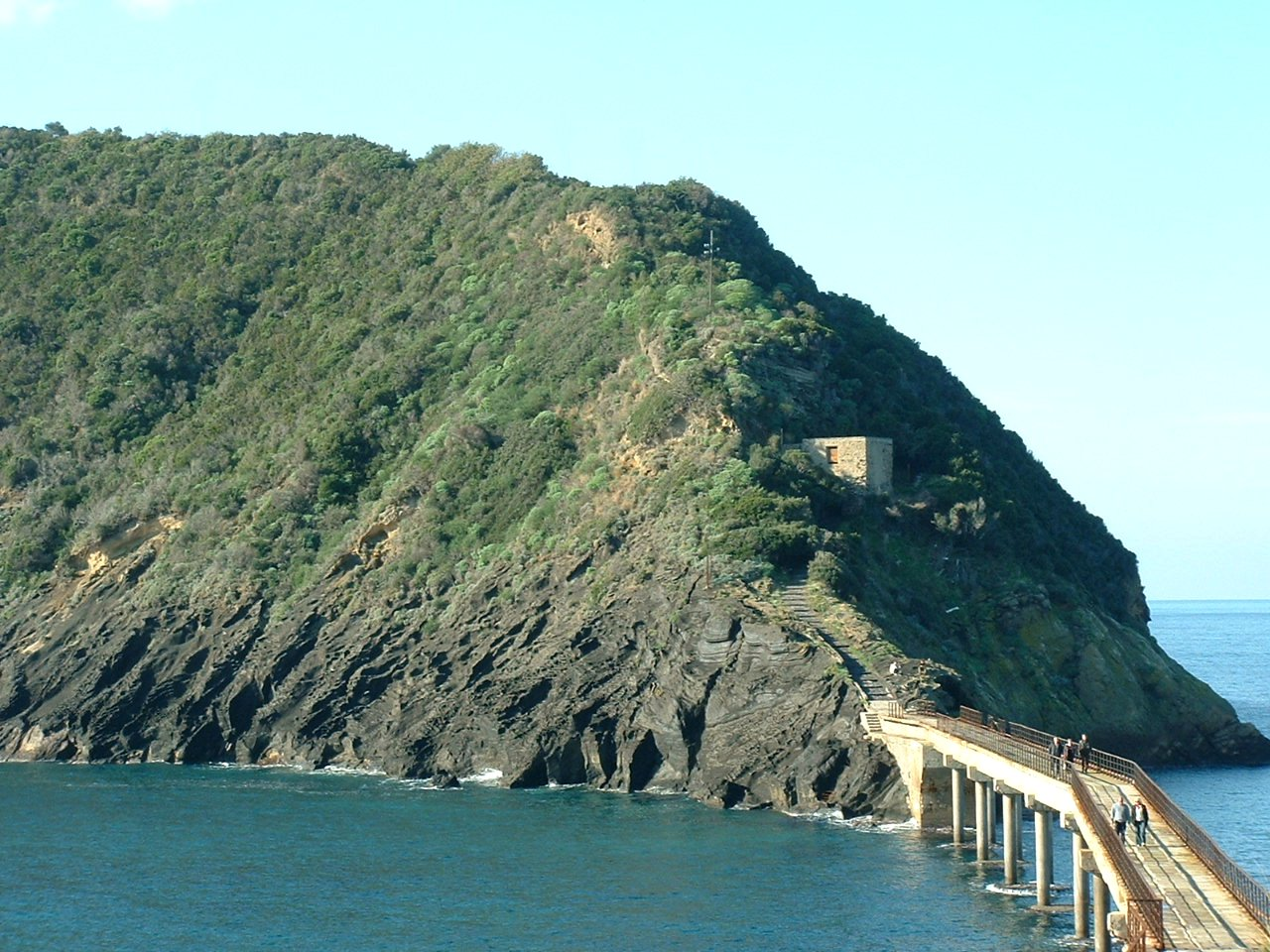
Vivara Island and the Bridge connecting it to Procida
