= Four Mothers (2024 film) =

Irish comedy film

- Danish film poster
- Directed by: Darren Thornton
- Screenplay by: Darren Thornton; Colin Thornton
- Based on: Mid-August Lunch by Gianni Di Gregorio
- Produced by: Eric Abraham; Jack Sidey; Martina Niland
- Starring: James McArdle; Fionnula Flanagan
- Production companies: Port Pictures; Portobello Films and Television
- Distributed by: Break Out Pictures; BFI Distribution
- Release dates: 13 October 2024 (BFI London Film Festival); 4 April 2025 (Ireland)
- Country: Ireland
- Language: English

Four Mothers is a 2024 Irish comedy film co-written and directed by Darren Thornton, co-written by Colin Thornton, and starring James McArdle and Fionnula Flanagan. It is an Irish-set, English-language remake of the 2008 Italian film Mid-August Lunch.

Four Mothers had its world premiere at the BFI London Film Festival on October 13, 2024, and was theatrically released in Ireland and the UK on 4 April 2025, by Break Out Pictures and BFI Distribution.

== Premise ==
A novelist on the brink of success must care for his aging mother and her friends.

== Cast ==
- James McArdle
- Fionnula Flanagan
- Niamh Cusack
- Dearbhla Molloy
- Panti Bliss
- Paddy Glynn
- Stella McCusker
- Gearoid Farrelly
- Gordon Hickey

== Production ==
In 2019, Screen Ireland were devising an Irish-set adaptation of Gianni Di Gregorio's 2008 Italian film Mid-August Lunch, adapted by the Thornton brothers, Colin and Darren. In May 2022, it was confirmed that Darren Thornton would also direct and production would come from Eric Abraham and Jack Sidey's Portobello Films and Television and Martina Niland for Port Pictures. That month, it was also confirmed that the cast would include James McArdle, Fionnula Flanagan, Dearbhla Molloy, Paddy Glynn and Stella McCusker. Niamh Cusack is also amongst the cast.

Principal photography started in Dublin in May 2022.

== Release ==
The film had its world premiere at the BFI London Film Festival on October 13, 2024. It was theatrically released in Ireland on 4 April 2025, by Break Out Pictures and BFI Distribution.

== Accolades ==
At the 2024 BFI London Film Festival, the film won the Festival Audience Award. In November 2025, James McArdle won the Best Actor (film/television) Award at the 2025 British Academy Scotland Awards. In January 2026, the film received seven nominations at the Irish Film & Television Awards, including for best film and best script, and best international actor for McArdle.
