= The Salt of Life =

- Film Poster
- Directed by: Gianni Di Gregorio
- Written by: Gianni Di Gregorio; Valerio Attanasio
- Produced by: Angelo Barbagallo; Gaetano Daniele
- Starring: Gianni Di Gregorio; Valeria De Franciscis; Teresa Di Gregorio
- Music by: Ratchev & Carratello
- Distributed by: Zeitgeist Films
- Release dates: February 2011 (Berlin); February 11, 2011 (Italy)
- Running time: 90 minutes
- Country: Italy
- Language: Italian

The Salt of Life (Italian: Gianni e le donne) is the second film from writer/director/actor Gianni Di Gregorio, who began his directorial career with 2008's Mid-August Lunch.

== Plot ==
Gianni (Gianni Di Gregorio) is 60 and might as well be invisible (except when others need something from him). Smothered by his mother (Valeria De Franciscis), ignored by his wife (Elisabetta Piccolomini), and befriended (against his will) by his daughter's layabout boyfriend, he finds retirement to be not quite what he'd hoped for. He sets out to find himself a love life, to comic and charming effect.

== Critical reception ==
The film has received widespread critical acclaim. The Guardian wrote: The Salt of Life "is packed with subtly observed details of behaviour and gesture of a kind we associate with Ealing comedy at its zenith, and an elaborate Chekhovian story is being told before we realise it". Los Angeles Times wrote: "rueful, funny and wise...a comedy not of errors but of the tiniest of missteps. A warm yet melancholy film of quiet yet inescapable charm, it has a feeling for character and personality that couldn't be more delicious". Roger Ebert wrote that the film "tells his story in an affectionate, low-key way, not as a smutty sex com but as a gentle look at a harmless man who realizes he has become invisible, except to people who need something from him". The Hollywood Reporter wrote: "The same, broad festival and arthouse audiences that gushed over Mid-August Lunch will eat up The Salt of Life, which resembles the first in tone but doesn't just cash in on a lucky formula. The added spice – more secondary characters, more melancholic chords – shows Di Gregorio's maturation as a filmmaker and despite the casual, vérité atmosphere, there's nothing arbitrary in this wistful ode to women by a man who's becoming invisible to them."

== See also ==
- List of Italian films of 2011
