= Agnese Nano =

Italian film, TV and theater actress (born 1965)

- Born: 5 November 1965 (age 60); Rome, Italy
- Occupation: Actress
- Known for: Cinema Paradiso

Agnese Nano (born 5 November 1965) is an Italian film, television and theater actress. Her first appearance was in 1987 but she became famous after her role as the young "Elena Mendola" in Cinema Paradiso by Giuseppe Tornatore, in 1988. Nano felt that playing Elena "was a deeply nurturing experience, crucial for the development of her future career".

== Filmography ==
- 1988: It's Happening Tomorrow, Daniele Luchetti
- 1988: Cinema Paradiso, Giuseppe Tornatore
- 1990: Faccione, Christian De Sica
- 1990: Adelaide, Lucio Gaudino
- 1991: Steps on the Moon, Claudio Antonino
- 1991: Baroque, Claudio Sestrieri
- 1992: The Abdomen of Maria, Memé Perlini
- 1992: The Long Silence, Margarethe von Trotta
- 1992: L'edera, Edera
- 1993: Tired Men, Lucio Gaudino
- 1994: The Summer of Bobby Charlton, Massimo Guglielmi
- 2001: Murderers in the festive days, Damiano Damiani
- 2002: Do Like Us, Francesco Apolloni
- 2003: Until I Make You Suffering, Francesco Colizzi
- 2004: Luna and the Others, Elisabetta Villaggio
- 2006: My Best Enemy, Carlo Verdone
- 2024: Never Too Late for Love, Gianni Di Gregorio
