= Gaiola (disambiguation) =

Gaiola may refer to:

- Gaiola, a municipality in the Province of Cuneo, Italy
- Gaiola Island, an island in the Gulf of Naples, Italy
- Gaiola (construction), a Portuguese building technique
- Riccardo Gaiola, Italian footballer
