= Giacomo Scarpelli =

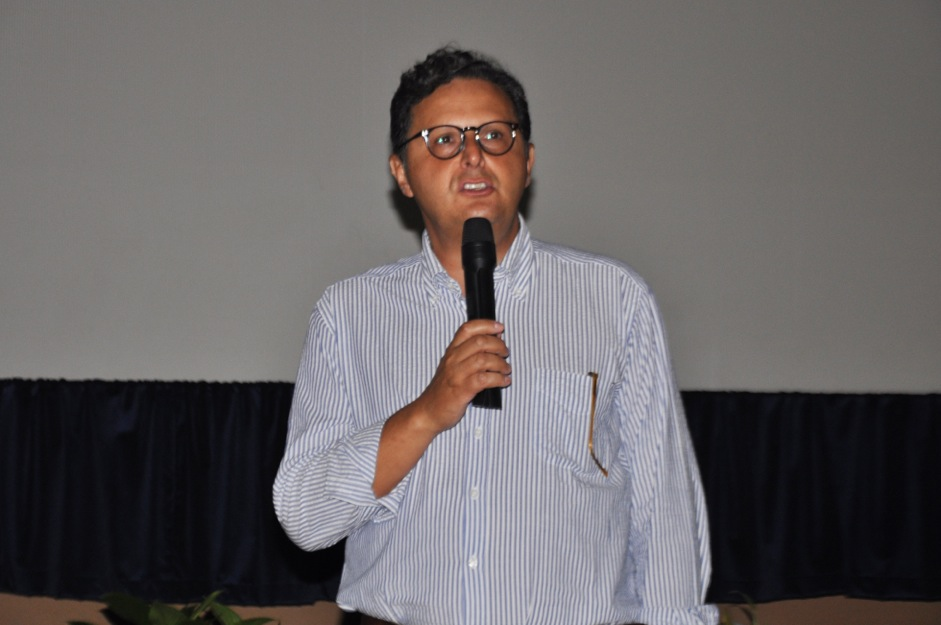

Giacomo Scarpelli (born 23 May 1956), son of Furio Scarpelli, is an Italian scholar in History of Philosophy and screenwriter.

== Early life ==
Scarpelli was born in Rome, Italy. He obtained a Ph.D. in philosophy at the University of Florence, and carried out further research and studies in England and the United States.

== Career ==
Scarpelli is a Fellow of the Royal Geographical Society and the Linnean Society of London and teaches History of Philosophy at the University of Modena and Reggio Emilia. He is the author of books about philosophy and science, including: Il Cranio di Cristallo. Evoluzione della specie e spiritualismo (1993), Il dio solo. Alle origini del monoteismo (1997), La scimmia, l’uomo e il superuomo. Nietzsche: evoluzioni e involuzioni (2008), Ingegno e congegno. Sentieri incrociati di filosofia e scienza (2011). He also published the essay "Hippos e Homo", about natural philosophy of horse (in "Passaggi", ed. by B. Cavarra e V. Rasini, 2011), and he edited works by Kant, Darwin, Bergson.

As a screenwriter, he served his apprenticeship with his father Furio Scarpelli. With the screenplay of Il Postino (The Postman, 1994) he earned an Oscar nomination as well as a nomination at the British Academy of Film and Television Arts. He wrote several screenplays for Ettore Scola: The Story of a Poor Young Man (1995) and The Dinner (1998) (both winner of Grolla d'oro at the Festival of St. Vincent) and Unfair Competition (2001) (Flaiano Prize). Other scripts by Giacomo Scarpelli include: Time to Kill (1989, directed by Giuliano Montaldo, starring Nicolas Cage), An Eyewitness Account (1997, directed by Pasquale Pozzessere), Opopomoz (2003, a cartoon directed by Enzo D’Alò) Napoleon and Me (2006, directed by Paolo Virzì), Christine Cristina (2009), the first film directed by Stefania Sandrelli and Tormenti (2011), from the graphic novel by his father Furio Scarpelli.
