= Corricella =

Port in the Phlegraean Islands in Italy

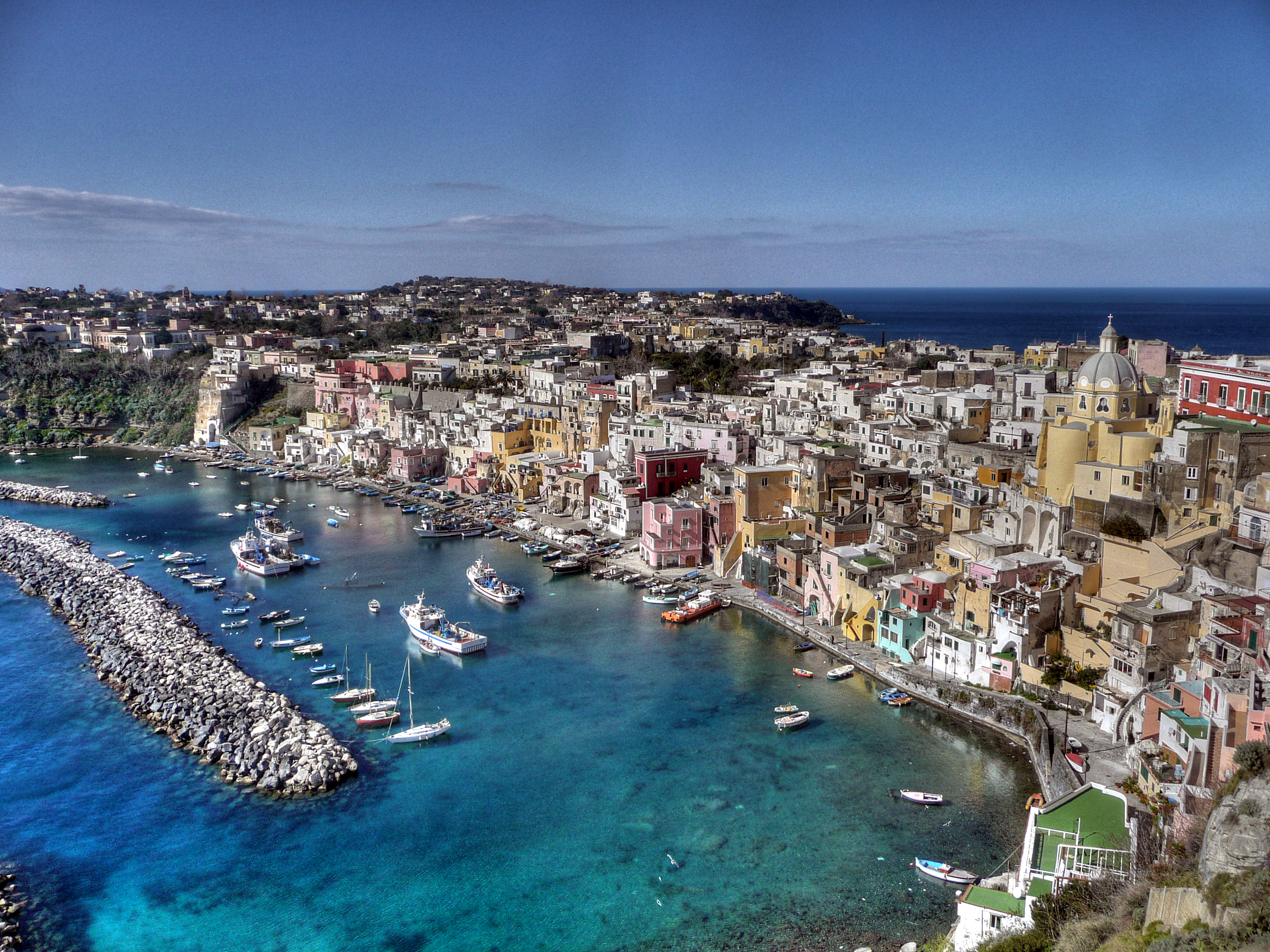
Photo of Corricella by Ekrem Canli.

Corricella is a port on Procida in the Phlegraean Islands off the coast of Naples in southern Italy. It is known for its vibrantly colorful housing.

== Tourism Popularity ==
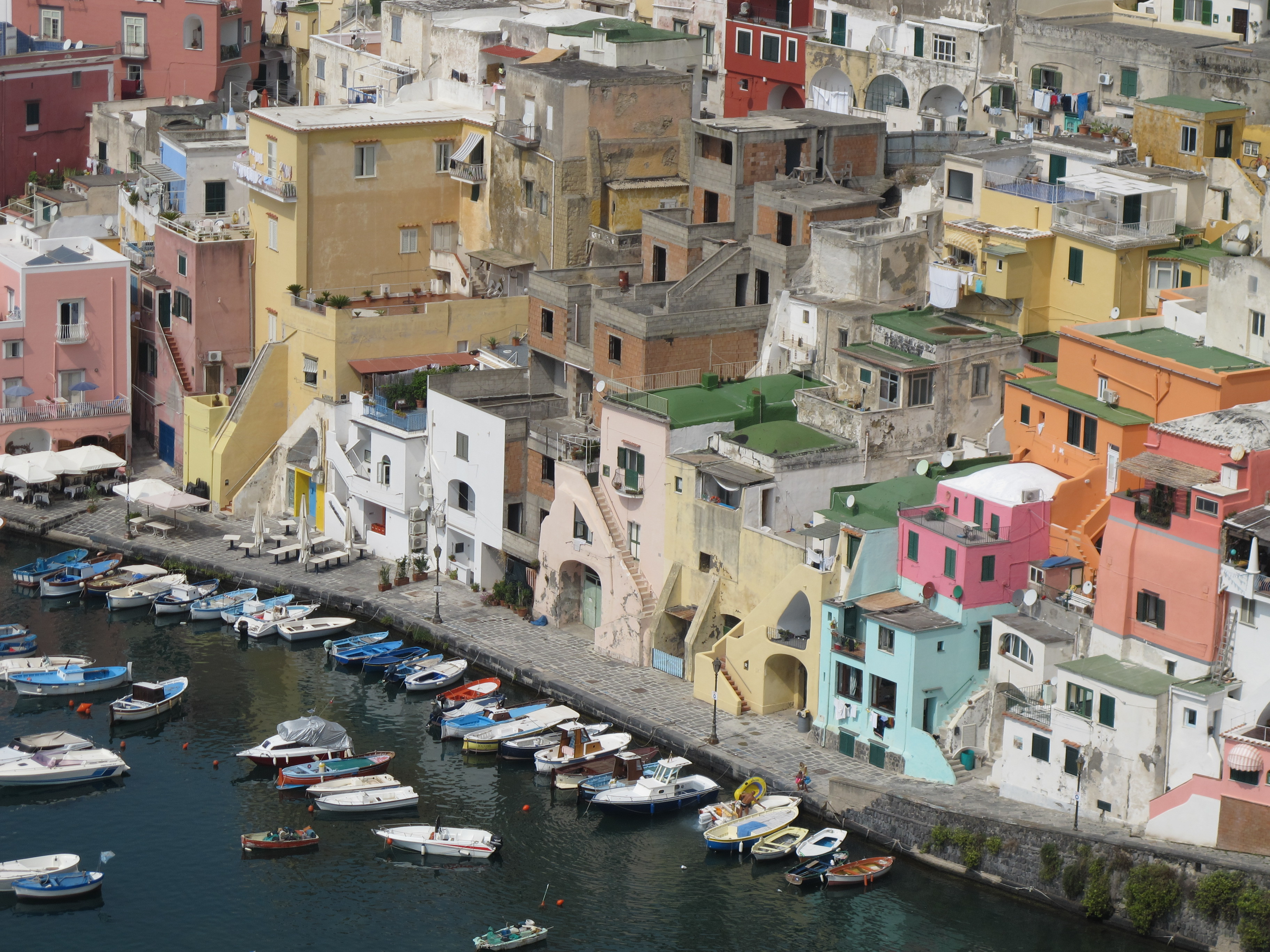
Photo of Corricella by Ho Visto Nina Volare.

The Telegraph in 2017 listed Corricella as the 11th of Italy's 19 most-beautiful villages. According to TheLocal.it, "...you can wander down the hill and into the colorful port of Corricella, where each house is painted in a different pastel shade."

Tourist writer Nick Bruno mentions Corricella in 2013, describing "a fine spot for absorbing the picturesque Corricella harbor scene." Corricella is "the most characteristic spot" on Procida according to the Rough Guides travel series.

== Popular culture ==
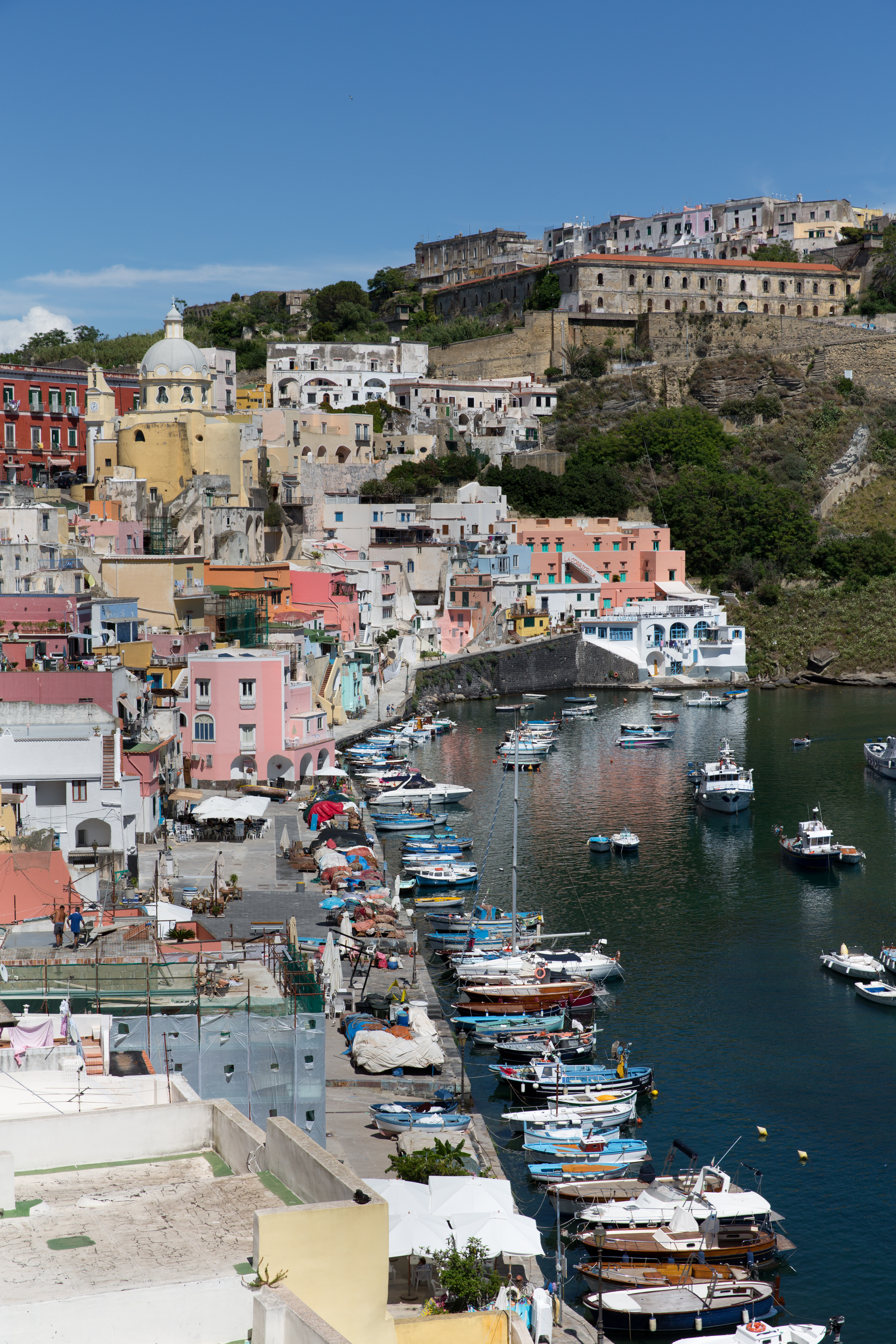
Photo of Corricella by Ekrem Canli.

Corricella was the setting for the waterfront scenes in the 1995 Academy Award-winning movie Il Postino (The Postman).
