= Il Postino: The Postman =

1994 film by Michael Radford

- Italian theatrical release poster
- Directed by: Michael Radford
- Screenplay by: Anna Pavignano; Michael Radford; Furio Scarpelli; Giacomo Scarpelli; Massimo Troisi
- Story by: Furio Scarpelli; Giacomo Scarpelli
- Based on: Ardiente paciencia by Antonio Skármeta
- Produced by: Mario Cecchi Gori; Vittorio Cecchi Gori; Gaetano Daniele
- Starring: Massimo Troisi; Philippe Noiret; Maria Grazia Cucinotta
- Cinematography: Franco Di Giacomo
- Edited by: Roberto Perpignani
- Music by: Luis Enríquez Bacalov
- Production companies: Cecchi Gori Group Tiger Cinematografica; Penta Film; Esterno Mediterraneo Film; Blue Dahlia Productions; K2 Two; Le Studio Canal+
- Distributed by: Variety Distribution; Cecchi Gori Distribuzione; Penta Film Distribuzione (Italy); Miramax International (Select territories; through Buena Vista International)
- Release dates: 1 September 1994 (VFF); 22 September 1994 (Italy); 16 June 1995 (USA)
- Running time: 108 minutes
- Countries: Italy; France; Belgium
- Languages: Italian; Spanish
- Budget: $3 million
- Box office: $80.5 million

Il Postino: The Postman (Italian: Il postino, lit. ''The Postman''; the title used for the original US release) is a 1994 comedy-drama film co-written by and starring Massimo Troisi and directed by English filmmaker Michael Radford. Based on the 1985 novel Ardiente paciencia (English translation: "Burning Patience") by Antonio Skármeta, itself adapted from a 1983 film written and directed by Skármeta, the film tells a fictional story in which the real life Chilean poet Pablo Neruda forms a friendship with a simple Procida postman (Troisi) who learns to love poetry. The cast includes Troisi, Philippe Noiret, and Maria Grazia Cucinotta. The screenplay was adapted by Radford, Troisi, Anna Pavignano, Furio Scarpelli, and Giacomo Scarpelli.

Writer/star Troisi was severely ill during filming, postponing heart surgery so it could be completed. The day after principal photography ended, he suffered a fatal heart attack, and the film was completed and released posthumously. The film was critically acclaimed, earning numerous accolades including BAFTA Awards for Best Film Not in the English Language, Best Direction, and Best Film Music. Composer Luis Bacalov won the Academy Award for Best Original Dramatic Score, and the film was nominated for Best Picture, Best Director, Best Actor, and Best Screenplay Based on Material Previously Produced or Published.

== Plot ==
In 1950, Pablo Neruda, the Chilean poet, is exiled to a small island in Italy for political reasons. His wife accompanies him. On the island, a local, Mario Ruoppolo, is dissatisfied with being a fisherman like his father. Mario looks for other work and is hired as a temporary postman, with Neruda as his only customer. He uses his bicycle to hand deliver Neruda's mail. (The island seems to have no cars.) Though poorly educated, the postman eventually befriends Neruda and becomes further influenced by Neruda's political views and poetry.

Meanwhile, Mario falls in love with a beautiful young lady, Beatrice Russo, who works in her aunt's village café. He is shy with her, but he enlists Neruda's help. Mario constantly asks Neruda if particular metaphors that he uses are suitable for his poems. Mario is able to better communicate with Beatrice and express his love through poetry. Despite the aunt's strong disapproval of Mario, because of his sensual poetry (which turns out to be largely stolen from Neruda), Beatrice responds favourably.

The two are married. The priest refuses to allow Mario to have Neruda as his best man because of politics; however, this is soon resolved. This was because Di Cosimo was the politician in office in the area with the Christian Democrats. At the wedding, Neruda receives the welcome news that there is no longer a Chilean warrant for his arrest, so he returns to Chile.

Mario writes Neruda a letter but never gets any reply. Several months later, he receives a letter from Neruda. However, to his dismay, it is actually from his secretary, asking Mario to send Neruda's old belongings back to Chile. While there Mario comes upon an old phonograph and listens to the song he first heard when he met Neruda. Moved, he makes recordings of all the beautiful sounds on the island onto a cassette including the heartbeat of his soon-to-be-born child.

Five years later, Neruda finds Beatrice and her son, Pablito (named in honour of Neruda), in the same old inn. From her, he discovers that Mario had been killed before their son was born. Mario had been scheduled to recite a poem he had composed at a large communist gathering in Naples; the demonstration was violently broken up by the police. She gives Neruda the recordings of village sounds that Mario had made for him. The film ends with Neruda walking on the beach where he used to talk with Mario, showing at the same time the communist gathering in which Mario was killed.

== Cast ==
- Massimo Troisi as Mario Ruoppolo
- Philippe Noiret as Pablo Neruda
- Maria Grazia Cucinotta as Beatrice Russo
- Renato Scarpa as The Telegrapher
- Linda Moretti as Donna Rosa
- Mariano Rigillo as Di Cosimo
- Anna Bonaiuto as Matilde Urrutia
- Simona Caparrini as Elsa Morante
- Michael Diana as Pablito
- Sergio Solli as Peasant

Noiret's Italian-language dialogue was dubbed by actor Bruno Alessandro.

== Production ==
Massimo Troisi, a popular Italian actor and filmmaker, had purchased the film rights to Antonio Skármeta's Ardiente paciencia intending to adapt it into a feature film. The novel was itself an adaptation of a largely-unknown 1983 film of the same name, written and directed by Skármeta. Troisi, having seen Michael Radford's 1983 film Another Time, Another Place, wrote a script treatment and gave it to Radford, who appreciated Troisi's enthusiasm but was dissatisfied with the script. Together with Troisi's ex-girlfriend Anna Pavignano, they stayed in a Santa Monica beachfront hotel and wrote a new screenplay. Among the changes made to the original novel was changing the setting from contemporary Chile to 1950s Italy, and the character of Mario from a teenage fisherman to a 40-year old postman. Whereas the novel and the 1983 film were set in Chile, with Neruda living in his home at Isla Negra around 1970, Il Postino: The Postman moves the setting to Italy in about 1950.

Armed with a production budget of $3 million, the film is set and was filmed on the island of Procida, gulf of Naples; some additional filming took place on Salina, one of the volcanic Aeolian Islands that form an archipelago off the northern coast of Sicily. Corricella is the setting for some of the waterfront scenes in the movie. Filming took 11 weeks, with only one break for the Easter holiday.

Troisi's performance was hampered by his worsening heart condition, brought on by childhood rheumatism. Troisi was so weak that it was only possible for him to work for about an hour each day. Most of his scenes were shot in one or two takes. A shooting schedule was designed to allow the film to be shot around him. This was aided greatly by the fact his body double bore such a striking resemblance to Troisi. He was used for all back to camera, long/medium shots and most of the bicycle riding sequences. Troisi recorded all of his dialogue early in the production, in case he died before filming could be completed. This later proved necessary, since Troisi died at his sister's house one day after principal photography was finished.

Troisi originally intended to co-direct the film with Radford, but was unable to effectively do so due to his illness. Though he is credited as co-director in the Italian release version, he is not credited in any other version, and as such was not eligible to be nominated for directing awards outside of Italy.

== Soundtrack ==
In 1994, to promote the film, Miramax published The Postman (Il Postino): Music From The Miramax Motion Picture, which besides the film's score, composed by Luis Enríquez Bacalov, includes Neruda's poems recited by many celebrities. There are a total of 31 tracks.

In 2002, CAM Original Soundtracks released a 17 track version of the score (CAM 509536-2) which was mastered in Dolby Surround.

The album won the Academy Award for Best Original Dramatic Score and the BAFTA Award for Best Film Music.

For the 2010 opera based on the film, see Daniel Catán.

== Reception ==
The film was very well received. Rotten Tomatoes reports that 92% of the critics liked the film, based on 105 reviews; the website's critic consensus says, "Il Postino movingly explores themes of love and friendship through sensitively depicted – and beautifully acted – relationships in 1950s Italy." It received a score of 81 on Metacritic, indicating "Universal Acclaim", based on 13 critic reviews.

In Italy, the film grossed over $8 million. The film was the second-highest-grossing non-English-language film in the UK for 1995 (behind La Reine Margot), with a gross of £534,673. It also grossed almost $1 million each in Germany and Spain. In the United States and Canada, the film surpassed Like Water for Chocolate as the highest-grossing non-English-language film of all time, with a gross of $21,848,932. Worldwide, it grossed $80.5 million.

== Accolades ==
=== Academy Awards ===
At the 68th Academy Awards (1996), the film's score, composed by Luis Enríquez Bacalov, won the Academy Award for Best Music (Original Dramatic Score).

- The film was also nominated for: Best Picture; Best Director (Michael Radford); Best Actor in a Leading Role (Massimo Troisi); and Best Screenplay Based on Material Previously Produced or Published.

Troisi received posthumous Academy Award nominations for Best Actor and Best Screenplay Based on Material Previously Produced or Published. Furthermore, producer Mario Cecchi Gori also received a posthumous Academy Award nomination for Best Picture.

=== BAFTA Awards ===
- The film won the BAFTA Award for Best Film Not in the English Language.
- Michael Radford won for Best Direction.
- The film's score, composed by Luis Enríquez Bacalov, won the BAFTA Award for Best Film Music.

Troisi received posthumous BAFTA Award nominations for Best Actor in a Leading Role and Best Screenplay.

=== Other awards ===
| Year | Association | Category | Nominee | Result |
|---|---|---|---|---|
| 1995 | Accademia del Cinema Italiano | Best Actor | Massimo Troisi (posthumous) | Nominated |
| 1995 | Accademia del Cinema Italiano | Best Cinematography | Franco Di Giacomo | Nominated |
| 1995 | Accademia del Cinema Italiano | Best Editing | Roberto Perpignani | Won |
| 1995 | Accademia del Cinema Italiano | Best Film | —N/a | Nominated |
| 1995 | Accademia del Cinema Italiano | Best Music | Luis Bacalov | Nominated |
| 1995 | Accademia del Cinema Italiano | Best Supporting Actor | Philippe Noiret | Nominated |
| 1995 | Association of Polish Filmmakers | Best Foreign Film | Michael Radford | Won |
| 1995 | Ciak | Best Film | Michael Radford | Won |
| 1995 | Ciak | Best Score | Luis Bacalov | Nominated |
| 1995 | Italian National Syndicate of Film Journalists | Special Silver Ribbon Award | Massimo Troisi (posthumous) | Won |
| 1995 | Italian National Syndicate of Film Journalists | Best Cinematography | Franco Di Giacomo | Nominated |
| 1995 | Italian National Syndicate of Film Journalists | Best Producer | Mario Cecchi Gori (posthumous); Vittorio Cecchi Gori | Won |
| 1995 | Italian National Syndicate of Film Journalists | Best Score | Luis Bacalov | Won |
| 1995 | Kansas City Film Critics Circle | Best Foreign Film | —N/a | Won |
| 1995 | Los Angeles Film Critics Association | Best Foreign Language Film | Michael Radford | Nominated |
| 1995 | National Board of Review | Top Foreign Films | —N/a | Won |
| 1995 | Rome Foreign Press Association | Best Cinematography | Franco Di Giacomo | Won |
| 1995 | Rome Foreign Press Association | Best Film | Michael Radford | Nominated |
| 1995 | Rome Foreign Press Association | Best Original Score | Luis Bacalov | Won |
| 1995 | São Paulo International Film Festival | Audience Award – Best Feature | Michael Radford | Won |
| 1995 | Society of Texas Film Critics | Best Foreign Film | —N/a | Won |
| 1996 | Argentine Film Critics Association | Best Foreign Film | Michael Radford | Won |
| 1996 | Broadcast Film Critics Association | Best Foreign Language Film | —N/a | Won |
| 1996 | Chicago Film Critics Association | Best Foreign Language Film | —N/a | Won |
| 1996 | Directors Guild of America | Outstanding Directorial Achievement in Motion Pictures | Michael Radford | Nominated |
| 1996 | London Film Critics' Circle | British Director of the Year | Michael Radford | Won |
| 1996 | London Film Critics' Circle | Foreign Language Film of the Year | —N/a | Won |
| 1996 | Norwegian International Film Festival | Best Foreign Feature Film | Michael Radford | Won |
| 1996 | Radio Nacional de España | Rosa de Sant Jordi Audience Award | Michael Radford | Won |
| 1996 | Radio Nacional de España | Best Foreign Film | Michael Radford | Won |
| 1996 | Screen Actors Guild | Outstanding Performance by a Male Actor in a Leading Role | Massimo Troisi (posthumous) | Nominated |
| 1997 | Danish Film Critics Association | Best European Film | Michael Radford | Won |
| 1997 | Japan Academy Film Prize Association | Best Foreign Language Film | —N/a | Won |
| 1997 | Kinema Junpo | Best Foreign Language Film | Michael Radford | Won |
| 1997 | Lumière Awards | Best Foreign Film | Michael Radford | Won |

== See also ==
- Neruda: A 2016 film about Pablo Neruda
