= Good for Nothing (2014 film) =

- Directed by: Gianni Di Gregorio
- Written by: Gianni Di Gregorio
- Story by: Massimo Gaudioso
- Produced by: Angelo Barbagallo
- Starring: Gianni Di Gregorio; Valentina Lodovini
- Cinematography: Gian Enrico Bianchi
- Edited by: Marco Spoletini
- Music by: Enrico Melozzi
- Release date: 23 October 2014
- Country: Italy
- Language: Italian

Good for Nothing (Italian: Buoni a nulla) is a 2014 comedy film written and directed by Gianni Di Gregorio. It premiered at the 2014 Rome Film Festival.

== Plot ==
Rome. Gianni Brandani is a meek man on the verge of retirement who works as a clerk in an "Italian-style" public facility, doing little or nothing. At home he has to deal with the bulky presence of his ex-wife, the daughter who has just started a family and the gruff elderly tenant downstairs.

Suddenly he receives the news that to get the pension he will have to work another three years in a modern and more efficient branch. In this branch all its limitations and backwardness come out.

Among the new colleagues is Marco, a good, docile and very efficient man who does favors to all the others, who take advantage of the fact that he cannot say no. He is also in love with the busty colleague Cinzia, younger than him, who deludes him. Gianni and Marco make friends, and learn to be respected by everyone.

== Cast ==
- Gianni Di Gregorio as Gianni
- Marco Marzocca as Marco
- Valentina Lodovini as Cinzia
- Marco Messeri as Raffaele
- Daniela Giordano as Marta
- Gianfelice Imparato as Christian
- Camilla Filippi as Camilla
- Anna Bonaiuto as The Boss

== See also ==
- List of Italian films of 2014
