= Never Too Late for Love =

2022 film

- Directed by: Gianni Di Gregorio
- Screenplay by: Gianni Di Gregorio; Marco Pettenello
- Produced by: Angelo Barbagallo
- Starring: Gianni Di Gregorio; Stefania Sandrelli
- Cinematography: Maurizio Calvesi
- Edited by: Marco Spoletini
- Music by: Ratchev & Carratello
- Release date: 2022
- Running time: 97 minutes
- Countries: Italy; France
- Language: Italian

Never Too Late for Love (Italian: Astolfo, French: Seconde Jeunesse) is a 2022 Italian-French comedy film co-written and directed by Gianni Di Gregorio and starring Di Gregorio and Stefania Sandrelli.

== Plot ==
Astolfo is a seventy-year-old retired professor who lives in Rome, in an apartment from which he is politely evicted by his landlady. Rents have gone up in Rome, so Astolfo decides to return to the countryside, to the hills of Artena, where his family's noble palace is located.

The large, dusty, and now decaying drawing rooms are inhabited by a local villager who himself was evicted by his ex-wife. Together, they decide to confront the present: the mayor, who has appropriated his lands (to build villas) that once belonged to his family in a distant past, and a meddlesome and wicked priest who has bricked up his hall and occupied his rooms to create a music room for the children of his parish.

But then comes Stefania, an attractive woman introduced by his somewhat womanizing cousin, who will shake up his quiet and composed life.

== Cast ==
- Gianni Di Gregorio as Astolfo
- Stefania Sandrelli as Stefania
- Alfonso Santagata as Carlo
- Alberto Testone as Oreste
- Gigio Morra as the cook
- Andrea Cosentino as the priest
- Simone Colombari as the mayor
- Agnese Nano as Franca
- Mauro Lamentia as Daniel
- Biagio Forestieri as Stefania's son

== Release ==
The film premiered at the 17th edition of the Rome Film Festival. It was released in Italian cinemas on 20 November 2022.

== Reception ==
The film was generally well received by critics. Davide Abbatescianni from Cineuropa described it as "a brilliant comedy with no shortage of hilarious scenes", "plenty of surreal humour" and in which "everything is made with measure, and it’s involving and entertaining." Devika Girish from The New York Times referred to it as "a small-town comedy that sparkles with unique characters and heartwarming wit", in which Di Gregorio turns "a trite [...] premise into something fresh and funny". Le Nouvel Obs wrote "This is Italian cinema as we like it: funny, sweet, full of quaint little characters and with a story that's tailor-made for our tender hearts".

The film received a David di Donatello nomination for best screenplay, and two Nastro d'Argento noms for best comedy film and best actress in a comedy film (Sandrelli).
