= Damned If You Do, Damned If You Don't =

2025 comedy film

- Italian: Come ti muovi, sbagli
- Directed by: Gianni Di Gregorio
- Written by: Gianni Di Gregorio; Marco Pettenello
- Produced by: Angelo Barbagallo; Antonio Tozzi
- Starring: Gianni Di Gregorio; Greta Scarano; Tom Wlaschiha
- Cinematography: Maurizio Calvesi
- Edited by: Sara Petracca
- Music by: Ratchev & Carratello
- Production companies: Bibi Film; Les Films du Poisson; Rai Cinema
- Release date: 5 September 2025 (Venice)
- Running time: 97 minutes
- Countries: Italy; France
- Language: Italian

Damned If You Do, Damned If You Don't (Italian: Come ti muovi, sbagli) is a 2025 comedy film written and directed by Gianni Di Gregorio. A co-production between Italy and France, the film had its world premiere at the 82nd Venice International Film Festival, in the Giornate degli Autori sidebar.

== Cast ==
- Gianni Di Gregorio as the professor
- Greta Scarano as Sofia
- Tom Wlaschiha as Helmut
- Anna Losano as Olga
- Pietro Serpi as Tommaso
- Iaia Forte as Giovanna
- Alessandro Bedetti as Antonio

== Production ==
The film was co-produced by Italian companies Bibi Film and Rai Cinema and French company Les Films du Poisson. It was shot in late 2024, between Rome and Castel di Sangro.

== Release ==
The film had its world premiere at the 82nd edition of the Venice Film Festival, serving as closing film of the Giornate degli Autori sidebar. It was released on Italian cinemas the same day by Fandango.

== Reception ==
DMovies’ film critic H.M. Ryan praise the "sense of warmth [that] radiates from this precious little film", in which " though the sequences are simple, they are gorgeous", and noted "if this film doesn’t make you long for a cozy fall spent in Italy, nothing will". Davide Abbatescianni from Cineuropa wrote the film's "approach feels tired compared to his previous works", but " despite its flaws, the film ultimately delivers: it manages to entertain through a simplistic approach, relying on minimal, coherently employed elements". Maddie Armstrong from View of the Arts described the film as "a hug for all viewers: neither possessing any kind of cheap shock-value rampant in cinema nor lacking plot by any means." La Repubblica's film critic Alberto Crespi called the film "light and ironic", "affectionate and melancholic".
