= 20 Cigarettes (film) =

2010 Italian drama film

- Film poster
- Italian: 20 sigarette
- Directed by: Aureliano Amadei
- Starring: Vinicio Marchioni; Carolina Crescentini; Giorgio Colangeli
- Release date: 5 September 2010 (VFF)
- Running time: 94 minutes
- Country: Italy
- Language: Italian

20 Cigarettes (Italian: 20 sigarette) is a 2010 Italian drama film directed by Aureliano Amadei. Amadei was a survivor of the 2003 Nasiriyah bombing and recalls his experience in the film.

== Cast ==
- Vinicio Marchioni as Aureliano Amadei
- Carolina Crescentini as Claudia
- Giorgio Colangeli as Stefano Rolla
- Giovanni Carroni as Generale Stano
