= Gaetano Daniele =

Italian film producer

- Occupation: film producer
- Years active: 1981–present

Gaetano Daniele (born 13 July 1956) is an Italian film producer. He was a producer for Il Postino: The Postman (1994) which won the BAFTA Award for Best Film Not in the English Language in 1996. The film also earned him an Academy Award nomination for Best Picture.
