= Christine Cristina =

2009 drama film

- Directed by: Stefania Sandrelli
- Screenplay by: Giacomo Scarpelli; Stefania Sandrelli; Marco Tiberi; Furio Scarpelli (supervision)
- Starring: Amanda Sandrelli; Alessio Boni
- Cinematography: Paolo Carnera
- Edited by: Patrizio Marone
- Music by: Pasquale Catalano
- Distributed by: 01 Distribution
- Release date: 2009
- Language: Italian

Christine Cristina is a 2009 Italian biographical drama film co-written and directed by Stefania Sandrelli, in her directorial debut. It depicts medieval writer Christine de Pizan's real life events.

== Cast ==
- Amanda Sandrelli as Christine
- Alessio Boni as Gerson
- Alessandro Haber as Charleton
- Paola Tiziana Cruciani as Therèse
- Blas Roca-Rey as Carmaux
- Naomi Marzullo as Maria
- Nicholas Marzullo as Giovanetto
- Roberto Herlitzka as Sartorius
- Sara Bertelà as Marguerite
- Mattia Sbragia as the judge
- Stefano Molinari as Gontler
- Antonella Attili as Nanà
- Paolo De Vita as Picpompon
- Ted Rusoff as Friar Severino

== Production ==
Sandrelli knew of Christine de Pizan after looking for books for Christmas gifts, and she soon became passionate about her story, even finding similarities with her own life. The film was produced by Cinemaundici, Diva and Rai Cinema with a budget of about 2.5 million euros.

== Release ==
The film premiered out of competition at the 2009 Rome Film Festival. It was released in Italian cinemas on 7 May 2010.

== Reception ==
Cineuropa described the film as "more of a sincere effort than a real success". Similarly, Mymovies noted how "the final product of the film do not live up to its high premises", and gave the film a score of 2.5 out of 5.
