= Gaiola Island =

Italian island

Gaiola
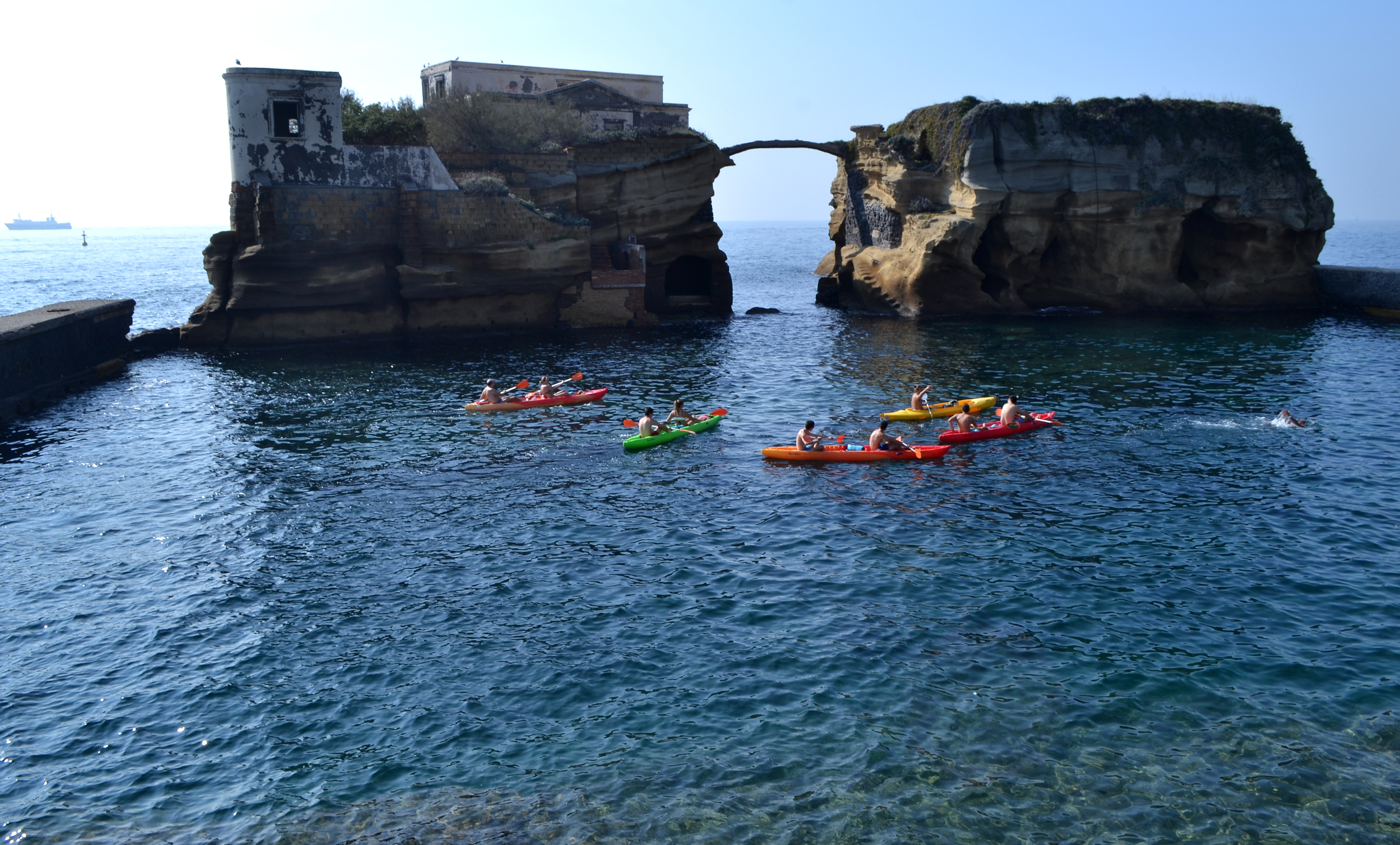
- View of Gaiola Island

- Location within Italy

Geography
- Location: Tyrrhenian Sea
- Coordinates: 40°47′30″N 14°11′13″E
- Adjacent to: Gulf of Naples

Administration
- Italy
- Region: Campania
- Metropolitan City: Metropolitan City of Naples (former Province of Naples)
- Largest settlement: Naples

Gaiola Island is one of the minor islands of Naples, off the city's Posillipo residential quarter, in the Metropolitan City of Naples and Campania region, southwestern Italy. It is located within the "Parco sommerso di Gaiola".

== Geography ==
It is located offshore in the Gulf of Naples, and a part of the volcanic Campanian Archipelago of the Tyrrhenian Sea.

The island is at the center of the Parco Sommerso di Gaiola or 'Underwater Park of Gaiola,' a protected marine reserve.

== History ==
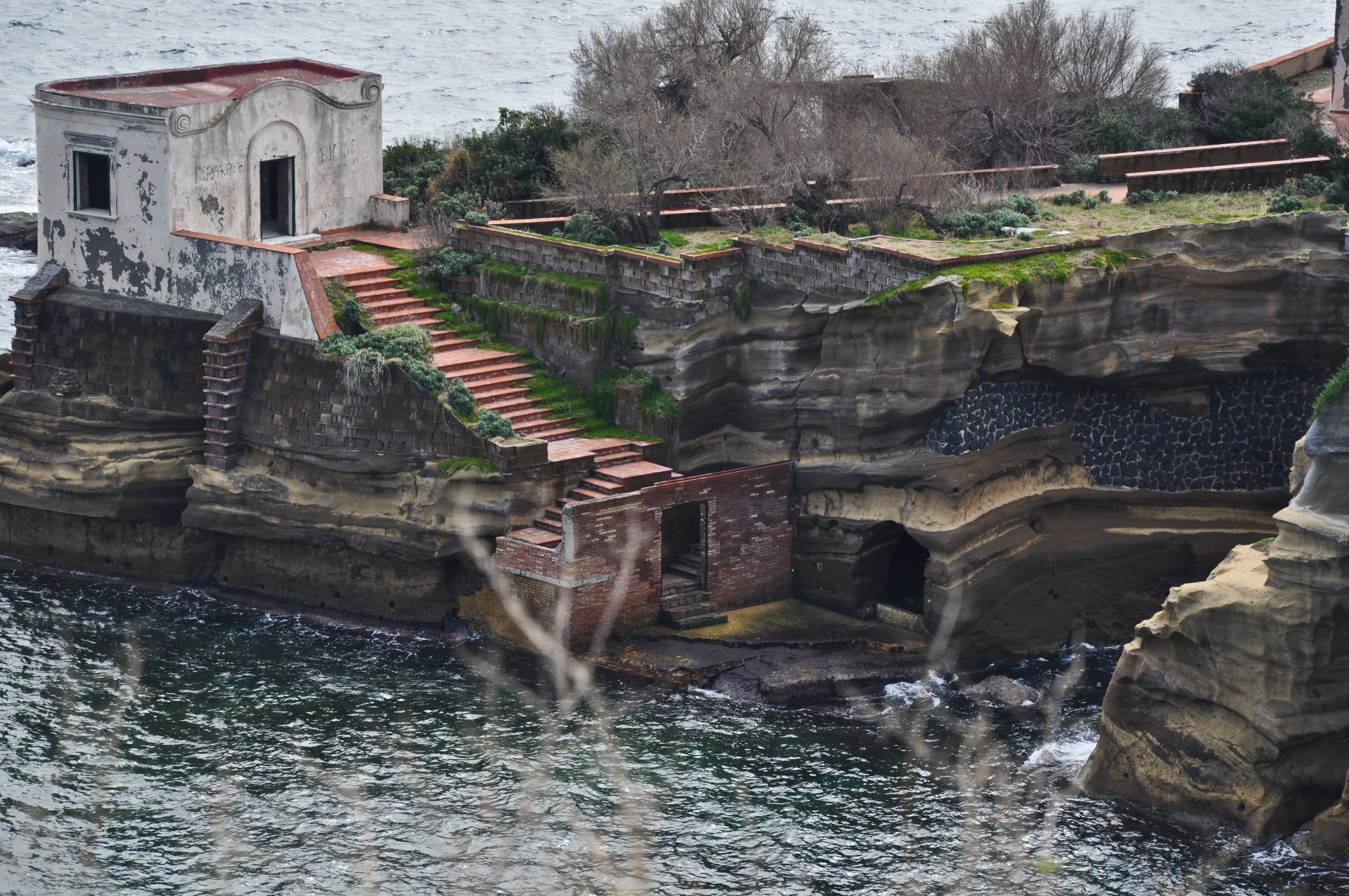
Pausilypon Archaeological Park

The island takes its name from the cavities that dot the coast of Posillipo. The Latin caveola ("little cave") passed through the region's dialect to become Caviola. Originally, the small island was known as Euplea, protector of safe navigation, and was the site of a small Roman temple dedicated to Venus.

The island is very close to the coast, reachable with a few strokes of swimming. It is assumed that originally it was nothing more than an extension of the promontory opposite and was artificially separated only at a later time at the behest of Lucullus.

In the 17th century, the island had many Roman factories. Two centuries later, the island served as a battery in defense of the Gulf of Naples.

At the beginning of the 19th century, the island was inhabited by a hermit, nicknamed "The Wizard", who lived thanks to the almsgiving of fishermen. Soon after, the island saw the construction of the villa that occupies it today and which was owned by the maritime engineer, Nelson Foley, brother-in-law to Sir Arthur Conan Doyle. Foley also owned the Villa Bechi on the mainland opposite Isola di Gaiola. From 1896-1903 the owner of the Villa Bechi was Norman Douglas, author of Land of the Siren, but he sold it back to Foley. The latter built a single-person cable chair that connected the island to the mainland.

=== 20th century ===
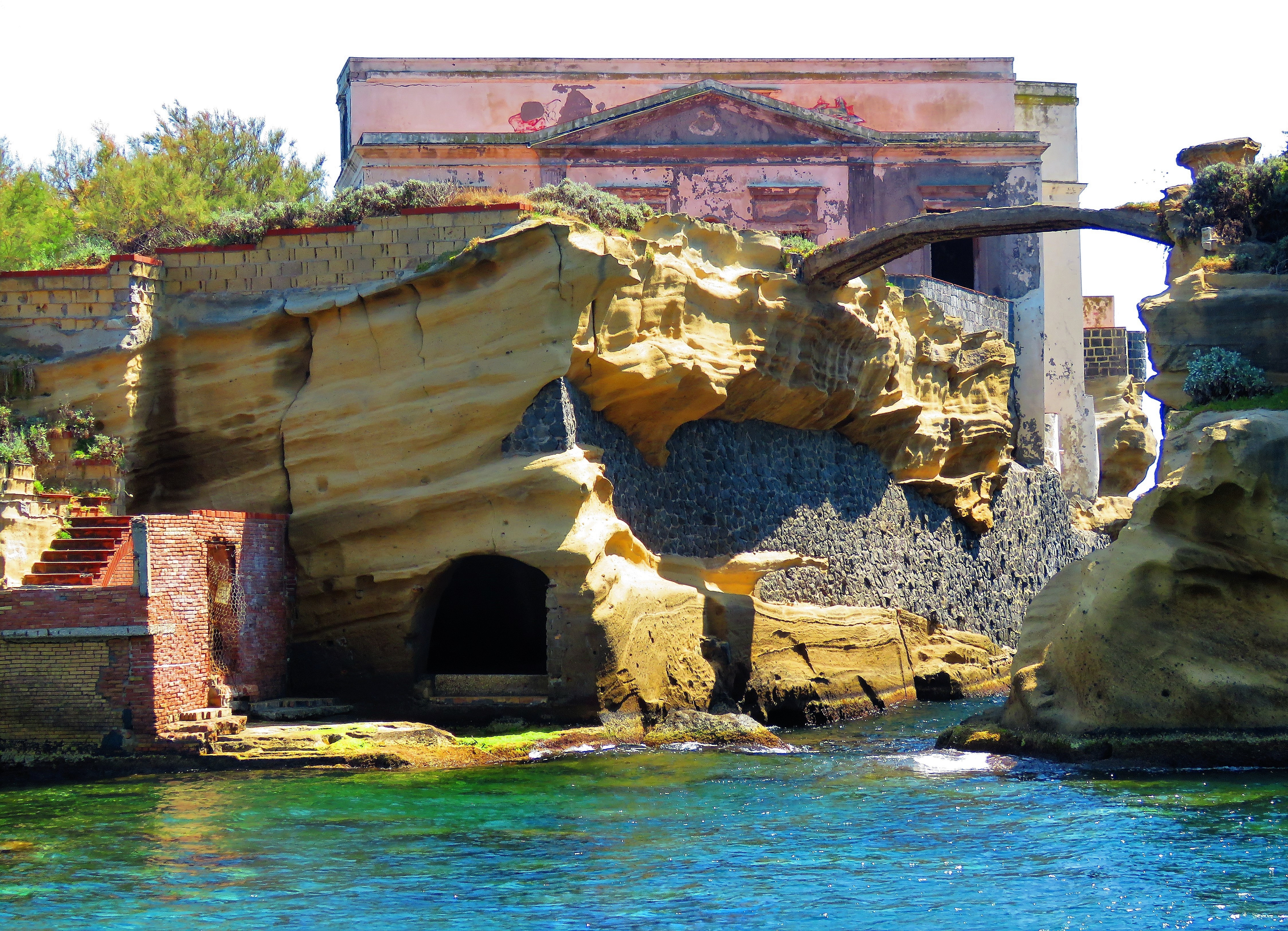
The villa on the island

Naples's legend has considered Gaiola a "cursed island", which with its beauty hides a "restless fate", the "Gaiola Malediction." The reputation developed from the frequent misfortunes and premature deaths in the families of its 20th century owners. For example, in the 1920s, it belonged to the Swiss Hans Braun, who was found dead and wrapped in a rug. A little later, his wife drowned in the sea. The next owner was the German Otto Grunback, who died of a heart attack while staying in the island's villa. A following owner, the Sandoz pharmaceutical industrialist heir Maurice-Yves Sandoz, committed suicide in a mental hospital in Switzerland.

The island has also since belonged to: Gianni Agnelli, the Turinese owner of Fiat Automobiles, who suffered the deaths of many relatives; and to J. Paul Getty, who experienced from afar the suicide of his oldest son, death of his youngest son, and kidnapping of a grandson, before his own death.

The last private owner of the island was Gianpasquale Grappone, who was jailed. Newspapers talked again about the "Gaiola Malediction" in 2009, after the murder of Franco Ambrosio and his wife Giovanna Sacco, who owned a villa opposite the island.

== Present day ==
The island is now the property of the government of the Campania region, and a protected area within it. It includes the Parco Sommerso di Gaiola (Underwater Park of Gaiola) marine reserve in the Gulf of Naples. The regional government gave it in management to Soprintendenza Archeologica. This public authority gave birth to a Study Centre in association with the NGO Centro Studi Interdisciplinari Gaiola

== See also ==
- List of islands of Italy
- Geography of Naples
- Tyrrhenian Sea topics
