= Vivara =

Satellite islet of Procida

Coordinates: 40°44′40″N 13°59′37″E

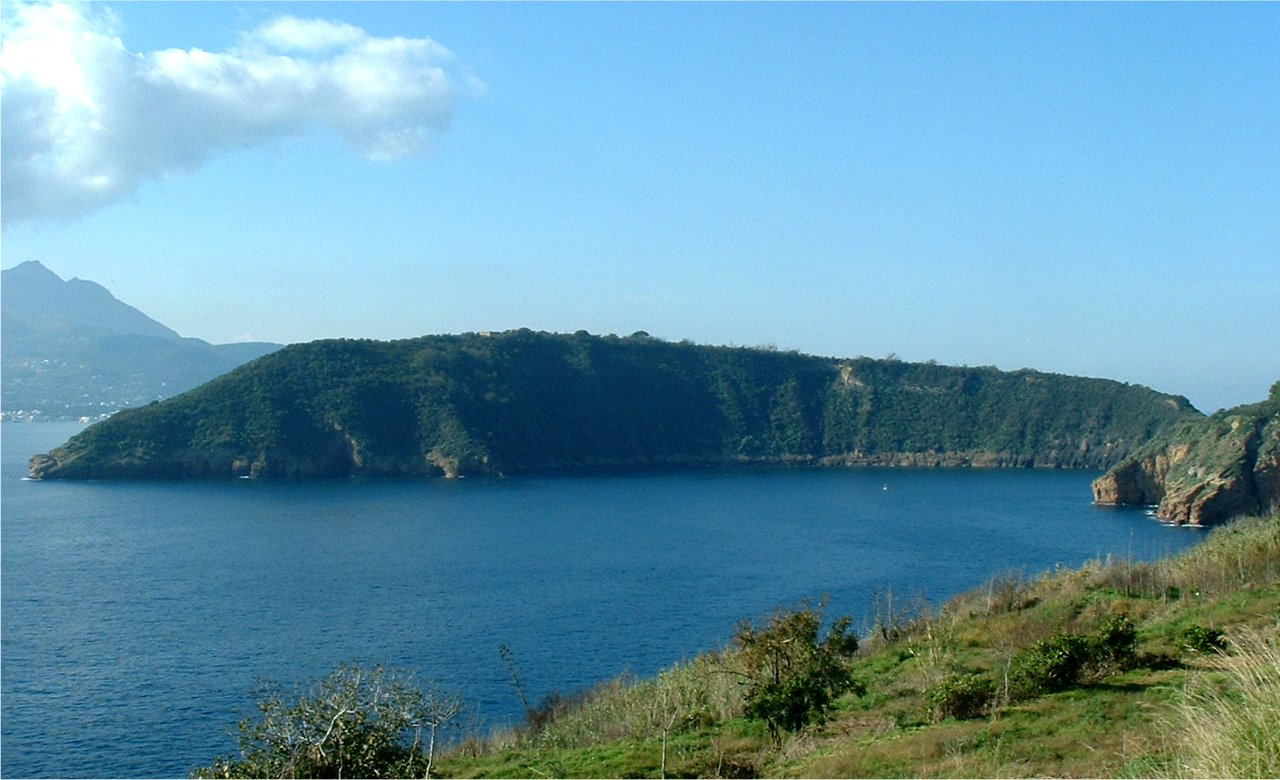

Geography
- Location: Tyrrhenian Sea

Administration
- Italy
- Region: Campania
- Province: Metropolitan City of Naples

Vivara is a satellite islet of Procida, one of the three main islands in the Gulf of Naples; the other two being Ischia and Capri.

== Geography ==
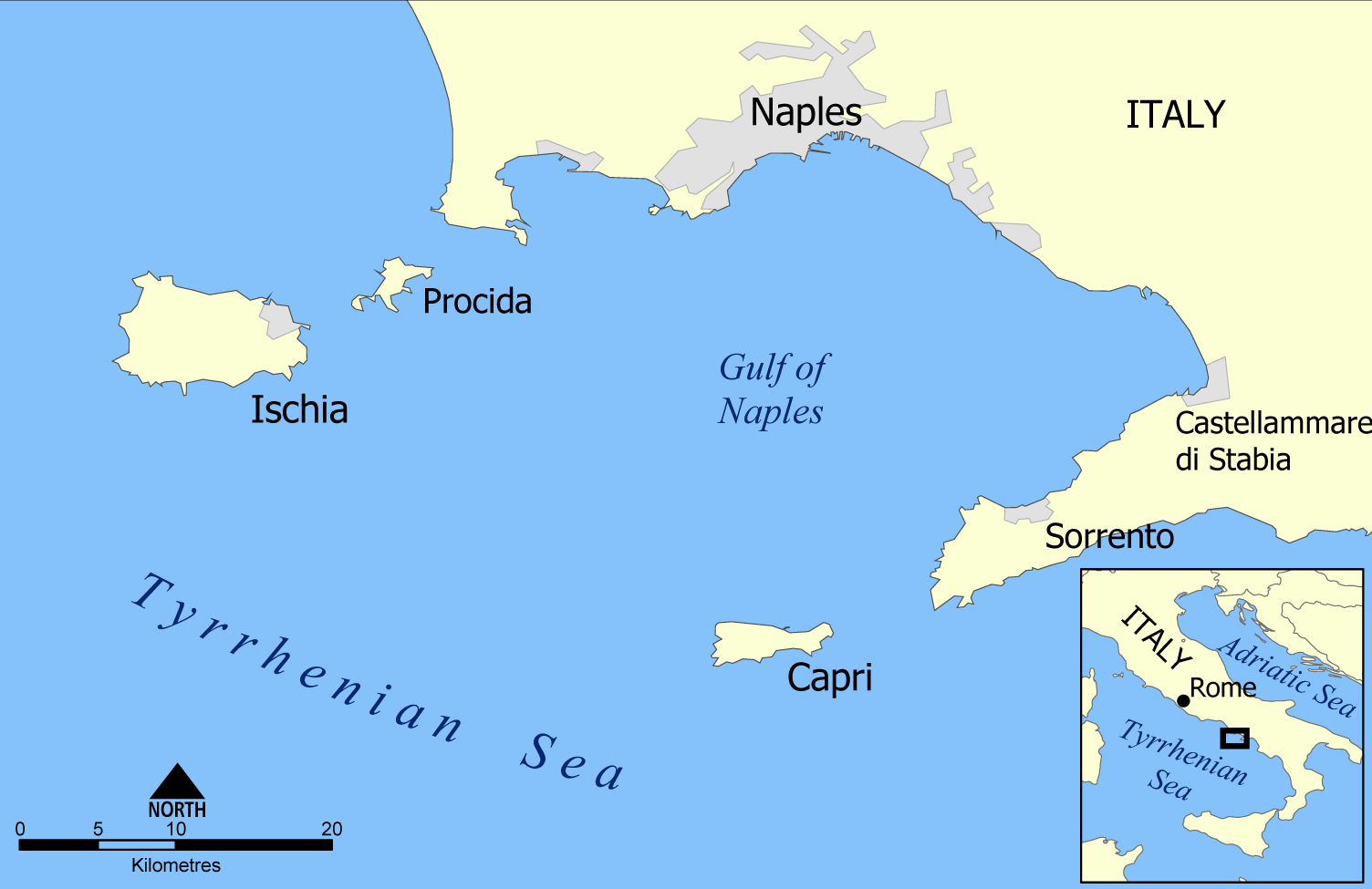
Gulf of Naples map

Vivara flanks Procida to the south-west and is connected to it by a small pedestrian bridge. The islet is a crescent-shaped remnant ridge of an ancient volcanic crater, part of the Phlegraean Fields. It is now a nature reserve of 35.63 hectares (88 acres), established under D.M. 24.06.02. In 1905, geographer Giuseppe De Lorenzo described the islet thus:

What remains without darkness and without mysteries, outside the doubt and eternal uncertainty of scientific analysis, limpid and clear in the light of day, is the pure aesthetic vision of the crater Vivara, rising from the crashing sea with a sweet and harmonious form, its cliffs hues of hot colours, expressing from her breast a green mantle of herbs and plants, on which laughs a perpetual spring.

== History ==
Archaeological digs have uncovered fragments of Mycenaean/Late Helladic pottery together with Proto-Apennine and Apennine material, pointing to a Middle Bronze Age trading site (emporium). Surveys around the coast, have established sunken coastal installations, pointing to extensive fishing and trading facilities, now up to 18m below the waterline. It is assumed that the lowest of these installations predate the Avellino eruption of Vesuvius, while some of the later ones may be associated with the Late Helladic material found elsewhere around the island.

== See also ==
- List of islands of Italy
