= Pennata =

Island in Italy

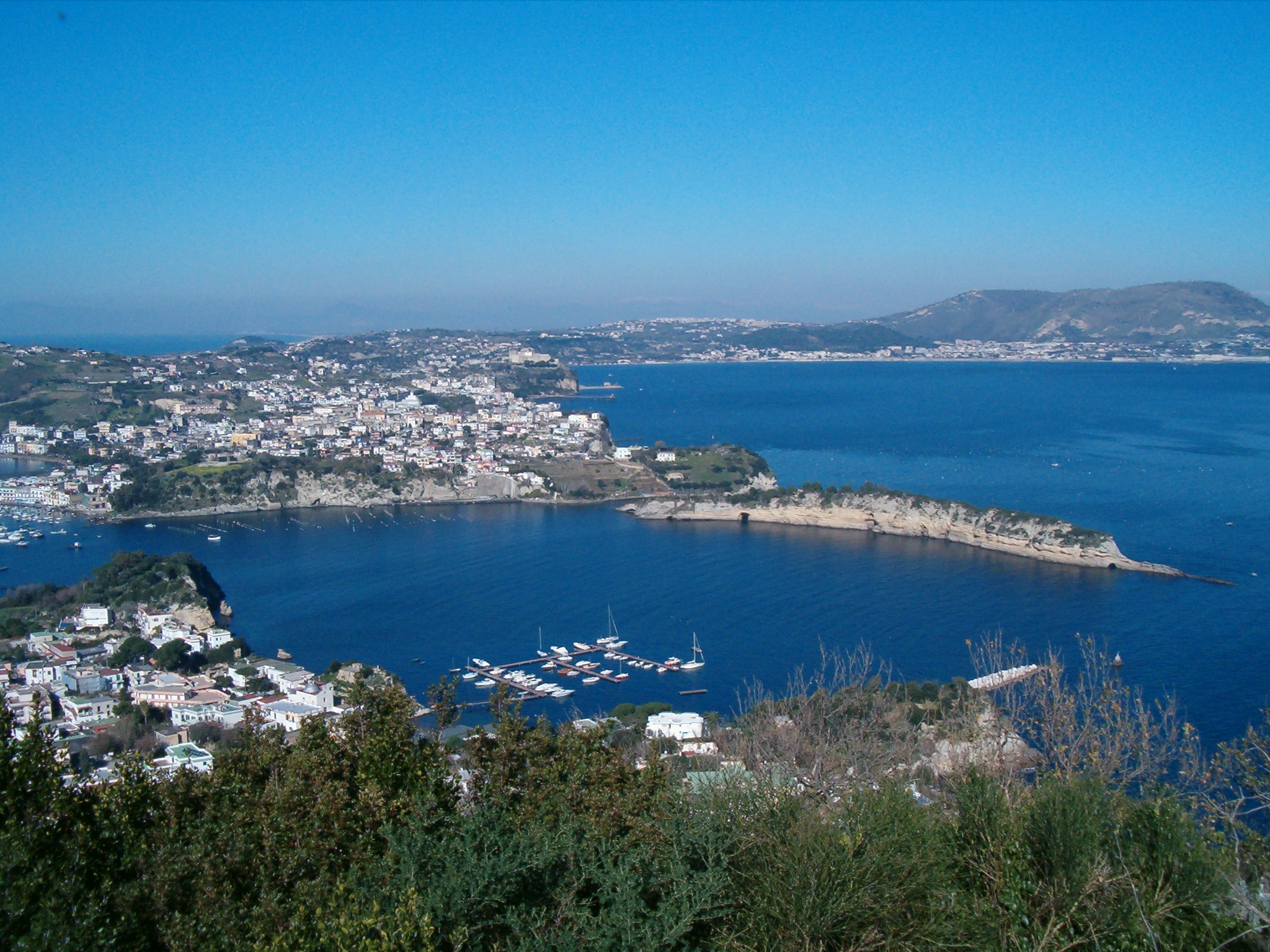
- Isola Pennata with Miseno in the background

Highest point
- Elevation: 29 m (95 ft)
- Coordinates: 40°47′32″N 14°05′19″E

Geography
- Location within Campania Location within Italy
- Location: Tyrrhenian Sea
- Country: Italy
- Region: Campania

Pennata is a wreck of the crater of Lake Miseno; it is part of the comune of Bacoli. It has been considered a small island since November 4, 1966 (the same day as the flood in Florence), when, following a violent sea storm, the strip of sand that connected it to the mainland disappeared. It is made up of yellow tuff and the very rich vegetation and the remains of brick structures show that it was a densely populated area.
