= Procida =

Procida Proceta (Neapolitan)
- Comune
- Comune di Procida
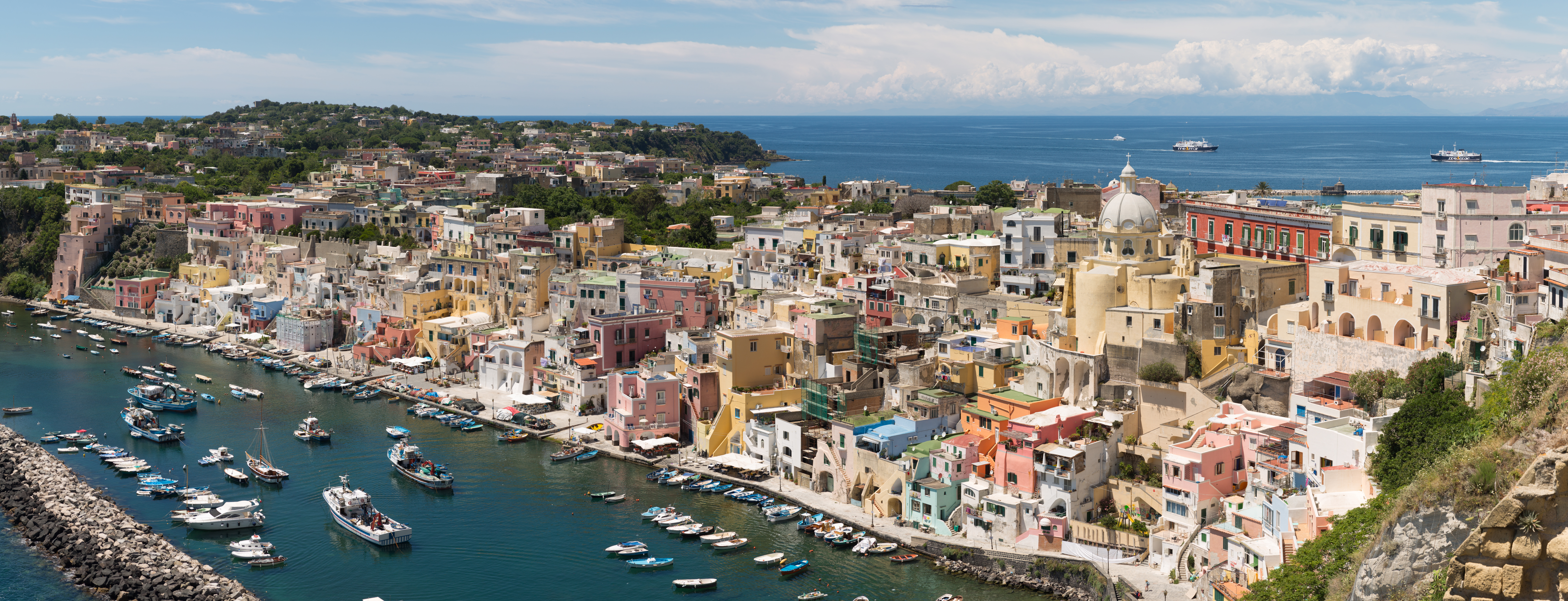
- View of Procida

- Location within Italy Location within Campania
- Coordinates: 40°45′30″N 14°01′00″E
- Country: Italy
- Region: Campania
- Metropolitan city: Naples (NA)
- Frazioni: Vivara

Government
  - Mayor: Raimondo Ambrosino

Area
  - Total: 4.26 km^{2} (1.64 sq mi)
- Elevation: 15 m (49 ft)

Population (2026)
  - Total: 9,971
  - Density: 2,340/km^{2} (6,060/sq mi)
- Demonym: Procidani
- Time zone: UTC+1 (CET)
  - Summer (DST): UTC+2 (CEST)
- Postal code: 80079
- Dialing code: 081
- Patron saint: St. Michael
- Saint day: September 29
- Website: Official website

Procida (Italian: [ˈprɔːtʃida]; Neapolitan: Proceta) is one of the Phlegraean Islands off the coast of Naples in southern Italy. The island is between Cape Miseno and the island of Ischia. With its tiny satellite island of Vivara, it is a comune (municipality) of the Metropolitan City of Naples, in the region of Campania. It has 9,971 inhabitants.

== Etymology ==
The island derives its name from the Latin name Prochyta. Προχύτη/Prochýtē means 'poured out' in Ancient Greek. According to another theory, Prochyta comes from the Ancient Greek verb prokeitai, meaning 'it lies forth', because of the appearance of the island seen from the sea.

== History ==
=== Ancient history ===
Some Mycenaean Greek objects from the 16th to 15th centuries BC have been found on Procida. Traces have also been found on Vivara, an islet off the southwest coast of Procida. The first historically attested Greek settlers arrived from the Aegean to this island during the 8th century BC, followed by other Greeks of Magna Graecia coming from nearby Cuma.

The island is mentioned by the Roman satirist, Juvenal, in Sat. 3, 5, as a barren place. Later, during Roman rule, Procida became a renowned resort for the patrician class of Rome.

=== Middle Ages ===
After the fall of the Western Roman Empire and the Byzantine reconquest in the Gothic Wars, Procida remained under the jurisdiction of the Duke of Naples. The continual devastation first by the Vandals and Goths, and later by the Saracens, pushed the population to resettle in a fortified village typical of medieval times. The population was sheltered by a cape, naturally defended by walls that peaked on the sea that were later fortified, thus acquiring the name of Terra Murata ("walled land").

Testimonies from this period are from those who staffed the watchtowers on the sea, which became the symbol of the island. With the Norman conquest of Southern Italy, Procida experienced feudal dominion; the island, with a mainland annexe (the future Mount of Procida), came under the control of the Da Procida family which continued to hold the island for more than two centuries. The most famous member of the family was John III of Procida, counsellor to Emperor Frederick II and leader of the revolt of the Sicilian Vespers.

In 1339, the fiefdom, together with the Island of Ischia, was handed over to the Cossa family, of French origin, loyal followers of the Angevin dynasty then reigning in Naples. Baldassare Cossa was elected Antipope in 1410 with the name of John XXIII. In this period a deep economic transformation of the island began, as agriculture was slowly abandoned in favour of fishing.

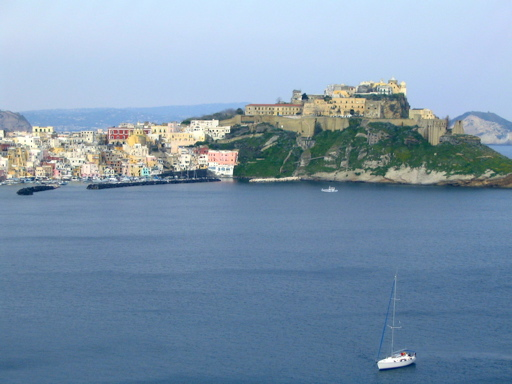
View of Corricella from Cape Pizzaco

=== Modern era ===
During the rule of Charles V, Emperor of Spain, the island was granted to the D'Avalos family. Pirate raids continued during this period. Particularly notable was one in 1534, led by the infamous Turk admiral Hayreddin Barbarossa.

In 1744, King Charles III of Spain made Procida a royal game reserve. In this period the Procidan fleet reached its zenith, backed by a period of flourishing shipbuilding. The population rose to approximately 16,000. In 1799, Procida took part in the revolts that led to the proclamation of the Neapolitan Republic. With the return of the Bourbon dynasty a few months later 12 Procidans were beheaded.

The Napoleonic Wars brought several episodes of devastation due to the island's strategic position in the naval engagements between the French and the English. In 1860, after the fall of the Kingdom of the Two Sicilies, the island became part of the newly formed Kingdom of Italy.

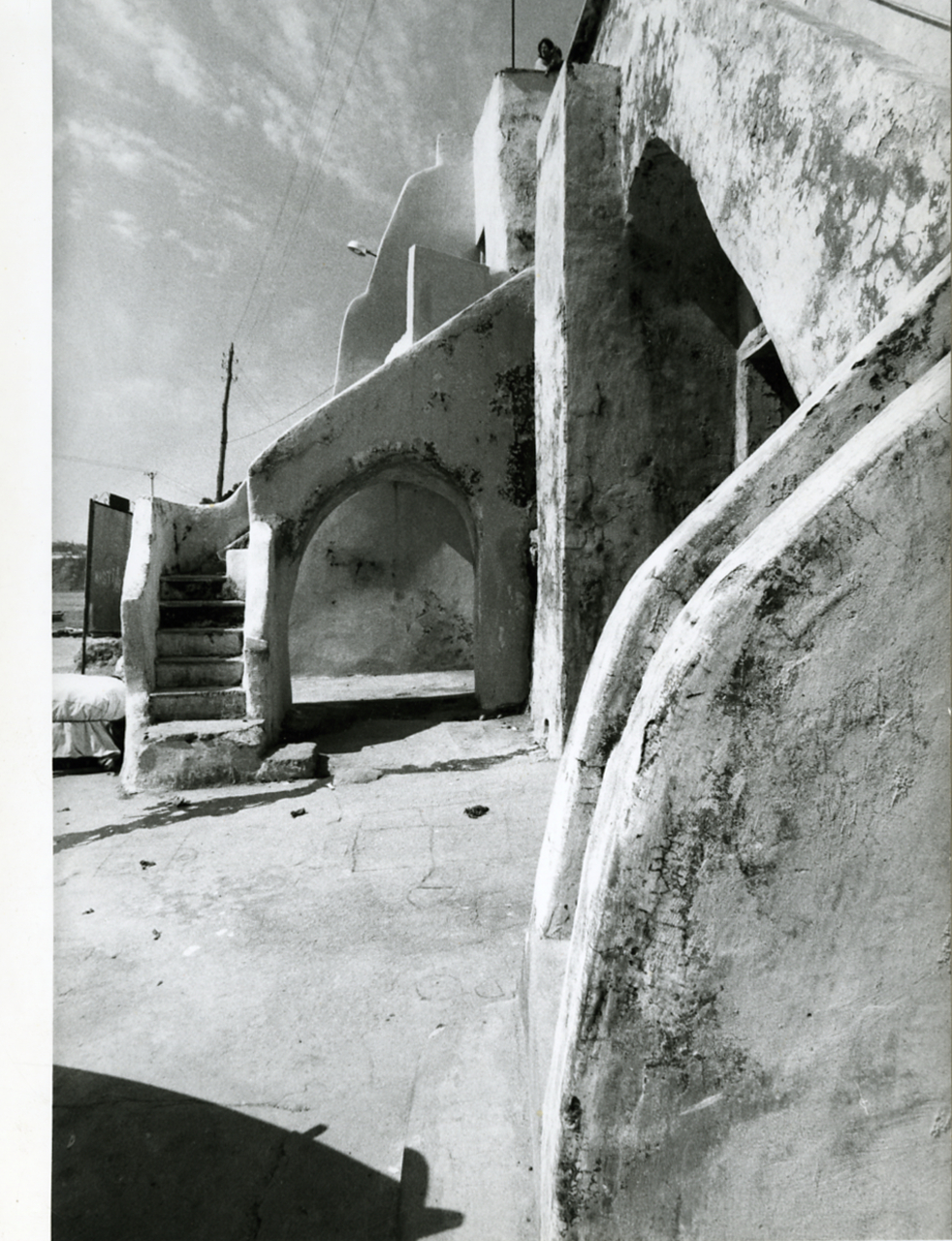
Procida in 1972.

=== 20th century ===
The 20th century saw a crisis in Procidan shipbuilding due to competition with industrial conglomerates. In 1907 Procida lost its mainland territory, which became independent and is commonly called the Mount of Procida (Monte di Procida).

In 1957, the first underwater aqueduct in Europe was built in Procida.

In the last few decades, the population has slowly begun to grow. The economy remains in great part tied to the marine industry, although the tourist industry has also grown.

== Geography ==
Procida is located between Capo Miseno and the island of Ischia. It is less than 4.1 square kilometres (1.6 sq mi). Its coastlines, very jagged, are 16 km (9.9 mi). The Terra Murata hill is the highest point on the island (91 metres (299 ft)).

Geologically, Procida was created by the eruption of four volcanoes, now dormant and submerged.

== Demographics ==
Historical population
Year	Pop.	±%
1861	10,808	—
1871	11,467	+6.1%
1881	10,891	−5.0%
1901	9,931	−8.8%
1911	10,156	+2.3%
1921	11,429	+12.5%
1931	9,934	−13.1%
1936	9,452	−4.9%
1951	10,156	+7.4%
1961	9,895	−2.6%
1971	10,015	+1.2%
1981	10,402	+3.9%
1991	10,559	+1.5%
2001	10,575	+0.2%
2011	10,228	−3.3%
2021	10,160	−0.7%
Source: ISTAT

As of 2026, the population is 9,971, of which 49.2% are male, and 50.8% are female. Minors make up 13.6% of the population, and seniors make up 27.0%.

=== Immigration ===
As of 2025, immigrants make up 6.0% of the population. The 5 largest foreign countries of birth are Ukraine, Bulgaria, the United States, Poland, and Romania.

== Culture ==
Several writers have set their novels in Procida. These include Graziella written by Alphonse de Lamartine, who came to Procida from Bourgogne at the beginning of the 19th century while in the French army; and Arturo's Island (1957) by Elsa Morante.

Procida has been chosen as a film set for numerous films (more than 30 films) including The Postman and The Talented Mr. Ripley. Procida was also the site of filming for scenes in Cleopatra, starring Elizabeth Taylor and Richard Burton. Specifically, the harbour of Procida was shown in scenes related to Cleopatra's barge, which was intended to represent the harbour of the ancient city of Tarsus in Asia Minor. In anachronistic Hollywood fashion, the baroque dome of the church in Procida can be seen in the background as the golden Egyptian barge of Cleopatra is docking in the port.

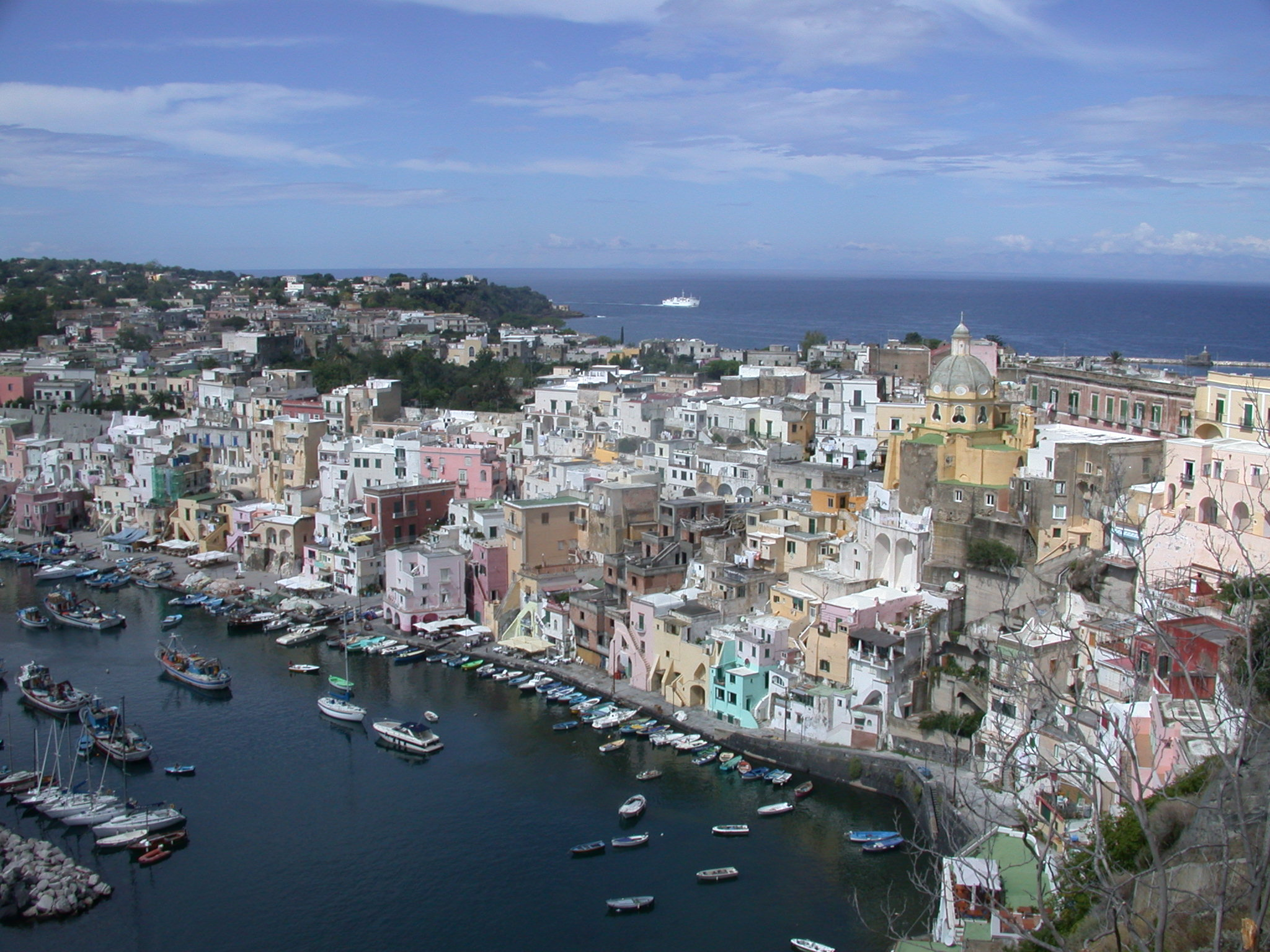
The historical centre

In 2013, Fabrizio Borgogna launched the Procida Film Festival, an international contest for young movie directors, writers and lovers.

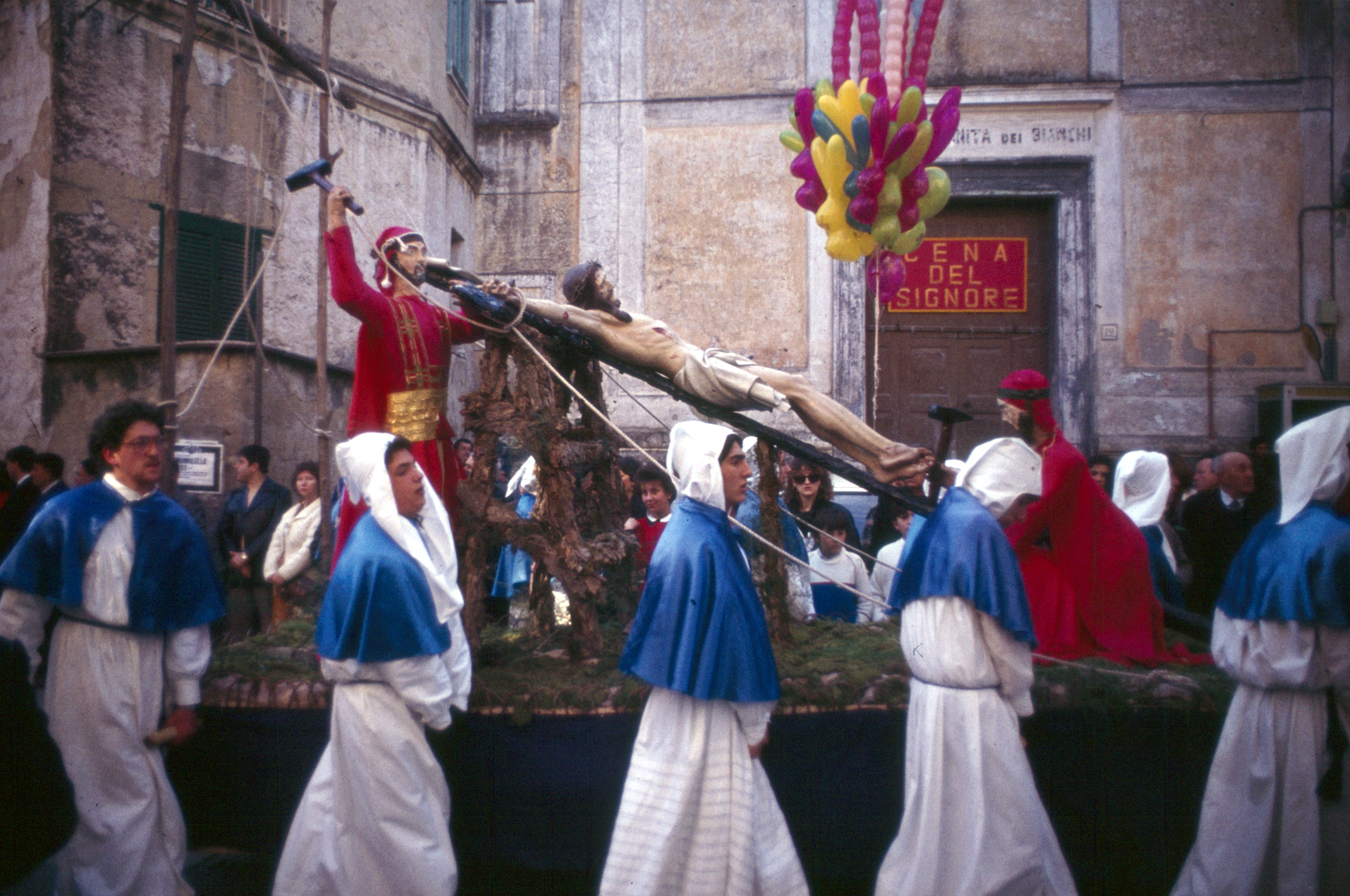
Procession of the Mysteries

=== Folklore and traditions ===
There are many religious traditions on the island tied to the period of Holy Week before Good Friday. The most evocative of these are the Procession of the Apostles of Holy Thursday and the Procession of the Mysteries of Good Friday. The last one is based on a tradition going back to the end of the 17th century. In the procession, the young males of the island, dressed in the traditional dress of the "Confraternity of the Turchini", carry allegorical wagons (called "mysteries") of religious character for a fixed distance, from the village of Torre Murata to the port of Marina Grande. The "mysteries", often highly artistic, are prepared by the young people and generally, nobody except them would have, at least in theory, seen them before the procession. After the procession, they are taken apart or destroyed.

Every summer, there is an election of the Graziella ("Little Graceful"), a young woman that wears the customary clothes of the island, referring to the history told in Alphonse de Lamartine's novel, Graziella. Also during the summer, a literary award dedicated to Elsa Morante and her novel, Arturo's Island, is presented.

=== Italian Capital of Culture 2022 ===
Procida has been chosen from among several Italian candidate cities to be the Italian Capital of Culture 2022. On 18 January 2020, the Italian Minister for Cultural Heritage and Activities and Tourism, Dario Franceschini announced the reasons that led to this choice: the cultural project has well-structured local and regional public and private support, giving importance to the heritage and landscape dimension of the place.

In relation to this, the artisanal dimension has been emphasised, given by the small workshops that characterise the tradition of the Mediterranean islands. The project encompasses characteristics such as authenticity, sustainability of development, culture of the islands and coastal areas of the Bel Paese.

== See also ==
- List of islands of Italy

== Sources ==
- Zazzera, Sergio (1984). Procida. Storia, tradizioni e immagini. Ci.Esse.Ti.
