= Mid-August Lunch =

- Theatrical movie poster
- Directed by: Gianni Di Gregorio
- Written by: Gianni Di Gregorio; Simone Riccardini
- Produced by: Matteo Garrone
- Starring: Gianni Di Gregorio; Valeria De Franciscis; Marina Cacciotti; Maria Cali
- Edited by: Marco Spoletini
- Distributed by: Zeitgeist Films
- Release date: 2 September 2008 (Venice Film Festival)
- Country: Italy
- Language: Italian

Mid-August Lunch (originally released as Pranzo di ferragosto) is a 2008 Italian comedy-drama and the directorial debut of Italian actor and screenwriter Gianni Di Gregorio. It was produced by Italian writer-director Matteo Garrone whose 2008 film Gomorrah was co-written by Di Gregorio. It was distributed in the US by Zeitgeist Films. It was remade in 2024 as the Irish film Four Mothers.

== Plot ==
Gianni is a middle aged man who is struggling to pay his flat's communal charges. He is unemployed, spending his days between home and the local wine bar, while looking after his 93-year-old mother during Italy's biggest summer holiday, Ferragosto. He is an only child, and his mother is demanding and capricious, and the pair live together in an apartment in Trastevere, Rome.

The day before Ferragosto, his landlord Alfonso turns up to collect the debts owed to him by Gianni. Gianni proposes a deal - that Alfonso forgive all his debts if he looks after his elderly mother, Marina, overnight, and for the day of Ferragosto so that he is able to go to a spa to cure his dermatitis. Alfonso agrees to this, and then tries to convince Gianni to host a second lady, his aunt Maria, who has memory problems (but makes excellent baked pasta). Gianni is reluctant but Alfonso convinces him by offering him money to do so. Gianni is then forced to look after a third woman, against his will, by his friend Marcello, who is also the local doctor. Marcello must work the night shift at the hospital, and as his mother's usual carer is away for the holiday, he is left with no one to look after his mother, Grazia. Grazia has a large number of foods which she is unable to eat, and must also take a long list of medications at incredibly specific times.

Gianni is involved in a series of difficult situations as a result of the differing personalities and of the four women in his care, along with the difficulties of preparing for the holiday, however lunch the following day is a surprisingly happy event. When the time comes for them all to leave, the women offer Gianni a large sum of money to stay with him, which Gianni gladly accepts.

== Cast ==
- Gianni Di Gregorio as Gianni
- Valeria De Franciscis as Donna Valeria
- Maria Cali as Aunt Maria
- Grazia Cesarini Sforza as Grazia
- Marina Cacciotti as Marina
- Alfonso Santagata as Alfonso

== Awards and nominations ==
The film won the Grand Prix Award and the Audience Award at the International Film Festival Bratislava, and also won the FIPRESCI Award. It was awarded the Lion of the Future for best debut film at the 65th Venice Film Festival in 2008. Additionally, it won awards at several other film festivals including the David Di Donatello Awards, the Satyajit Ray Award at the London Film Festival, and the Golden Snail award at the Academy of Food and Film in Bologna. It was remade in English as Four Mothers.
