= Valeria De Franciscis =

Italian actress

- Born: 14 December 1915; Rome, Italy
- Died: 9 February 2014 (aged 98); Rome, Italy
- Occupation: Actress
- Years active: 2008–2011

Valeria De Franciscis (14 December 1915 – 9 February 2014) was an Italian actress. She is best known for her performance as Gianni's mother in The Salt of Life, for which she received a nomination for the David di Donatello for Best Supporting Actress at the age of 96.

== Selected filmography ==
Year	Title	Role	Notes
2008	Mid-August Lunch	Valeria	
2011	The Salt of Life		
