= Gianni Di Gregorio =

Italian director, screenwriter and actor

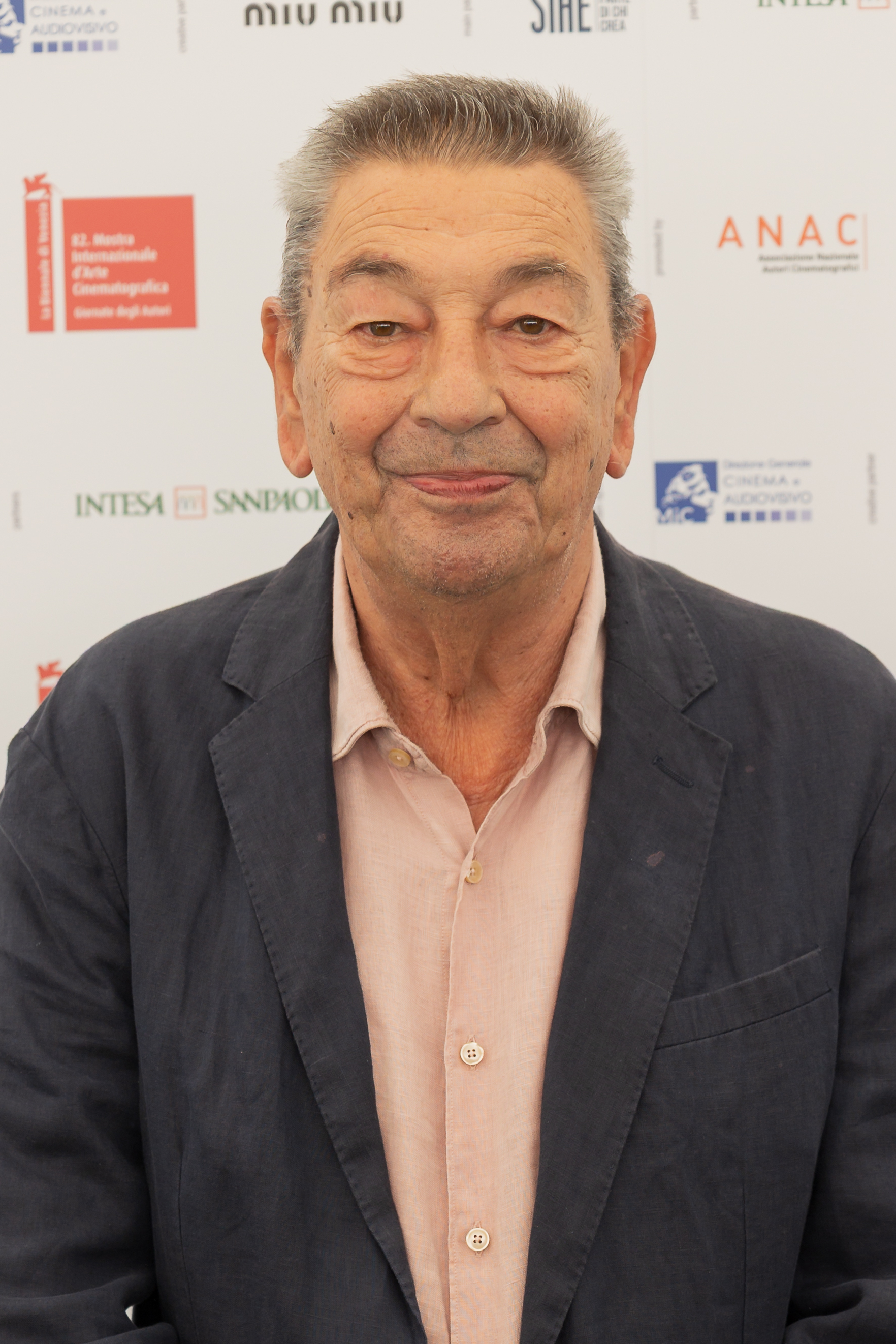
- Di Gregorio in 2025
- Born: 19 February 1949 (age 77); Rome, Italy
- Occupations: Director; Screenwriter

Gianni Di Gregorio (born 19 February 1949) is an Italian director, screenwriter and actor.

== Life and career ==
Born in Rome, Di Gregorio trained as a stage actor and director in the Drama School of Alessandro Fersen. He started his professional career as a screenwriter in the second half of the 1980s.

In the 1990s, Di Gregorio started collaborating with Matteo Garrone as a screenwriter, an actor and an assistant director, their most famous work being the 2008 award-winning film Gomorrah. He made his directorial debut in 2008 with the critically acclaimed Mid-August Lunch, which he also wrote and starred in; he followed that up with other films in the same vein.

== Filmography ==
- Giovanni Senzapensieri (1986, co-writer)
- Sembra morto... ma è solo svenuto (1986, co-writer)
- Stazione di servizio (1989, co-writer, 2 episodes)
- Affetti speciali (1989, co-writer)
- Naufraghi sotto costa (1991, co-writer)
- Ospiti (1998, actor as Giacomo)
- Estate romana (2000, actor as Lodeger)
- Viva la scimmia (2002, co-writer)
- Gomorrah (2008, co-writer)
- Mid-August Lunch (2008, director and co-writer)
- The Salt of Life (2011, director and co-writer)
- Good for Nothing (2014, director and co-writer)
- Citizens of the World (2019, director and co-writer)
- Never Too Late for Love (2022, director and co-writer)
- Damned If You Do, Damned If You Don't (2025, director and co-writer)
