= List of Italian films of 2011 =

This is a list of films produced in Italy in 2011 (see 2011 in film). Of the 100 or so Italian films released in 2011, about half of them were comedies.

== 2011 ==
Title	Director	Cast	Genre	Notes
2011
All at Sea	Andrea Molaioli	Gigi Proietti, Marco Giallini	Comedy	
L'Amore fa Male	Mirca Viola	Stefania Rocca, Paolo Briguglia, Nicole Grimaudo	Drama	
Baciato dalla fortuna	Paolo Costella	Asia Argento, Nicole Grimaudo, Alessandro Gassman	Comedy	
Bar Sport	Massimo Martelli	Claudio Bisio, Giuseppe Battiston	Comedy	
The Big Heart of Girls	Pupi Avati	Cesare Cremonini, Micaela Ramazzotti	Drama	
The Cardboard Village	Ermanno Olmi	Michael Lonsdale, Rutger Hauer, Massimo De Francovich	Comedy	
Drifters	Matteo Rovere	Miriam Giovanelli, Asia Argento	Drama	
Easy!	Francesco Bruni	Fabrizio Bentivoglio, Barbora Bobuľová	Comedy	
Eaters	Luca Boni and Marco Ristori		Horror	
The Entrepreneur	Giuliano Montaldo	Pierfrancesco Favino, Carolina Crescentini	Drama	
Escort in Love	Massimiliano Bruno	Paola Cortellesi, Raoul Bova	Comedy	
Ex – Amici come prima!	Carlo Vanzina	Alessandro Gassman, Anna Foglietta, Enrico Brignano	Comedy	
The First Man	Gianni Amelio	Jacques Gamblin, Maya Sansa	Drama	
The Greatest of All	Carlo Virzì	Claudia Pandolfi, Alessandro Roja	Comedy	
Heavenly Body	Alice Rohrwacher	Anita Caprioli	Drama	
The Immature	Paolo Genovese	Raoul Bova, Barbora Bobuľová	Comedy	
Islands (Isole)	Stefano Chiantini	Asia Argento, Giorgio Colangeli	Drama	
It May Be Love But It Doesn't Show	Ficarra e Picone	Ficarra e Picone, Ambra Angiolini	Comedy	
The Jewel	Andrea Molaioli	Toni Servillo, Remo Girone, Sarah Felberbaum	Drama	
Kryptonite!	Ivan Cotroneo	Valeria Golino, Luca Zingaretti	Comedy	
The Last Man on Earth	Gian Alfonso Pacinotti	Gabriele Spinelli, Roberto Herlitzka	Science fiction	
Lezioni di Cioccolato 2	Alessio Maria Federici	Luca Argentero, Violante Placido, Barbara Mantini	Comedy	Sequel to Lezioni di Cioccolato
Make a Fake	Giovanni Albanese	Vincenzo Salemme, Giuseppe Battiston, Donatella Finocchiaro	Comedy	
Manuale d'amore 3	Giovanni Veronesi	Carlo Verdone, Robert De Niro, Monica Bellucci, Riccardo Scamarcio, Michele Placido	Comedy	Sequel to Manuale d'amore
Maternity Blues	Fabrizio Cattani	Andrea Osvart, Monica Birladeanu	Drama	
Missione di pace	Francesco Lagi	Silvio Orlando, Alba Rohrwacher	Black comedy	
Mozzarella Stories	Edoardo De Angelis	Luisa Ranieri, Luca Zingaretti, Aida Turturro	Crime-comedy	
Morituris	Raffaele Picchio	Valentina D'Andrea	Horror	
Napoletans	Luigi Russo	Massimo Ceccherini, Maurizio Casagrande	Comedy	
One Day More	Massimo Venier	Fabio Volo, Isabella Ragonese	Romance	
Il paese delle spose infelici	Pippo Mezzapesa	Aylin Prandi	Drama	
The Perfect Life	Lucio Pellegrini	Pierfrancesco Favino, Stefano Accorsi, Vittoria Puccini	Comedy	
Qualunquemente	Giulio Manfredonia	Antonio Albanese	Comedy	
Questo mondo è per te	Francesco Falaschi	Paolo Sassanelli, Cecilia Dazzi	Comedy	
Rasputin	Louis Nero	Francesco Cabras, Franco Nero	Drama	
The Salt of Life	Gianni Di Gregorio	Gianni Di Gregorio, Valeria de Franciscis	Comedy	
Shun Li and the Poet	Andrea Segre	Zhao Tao, Rade Sherbedgia, Marco Paolini	Drama	Venice Days at 68th Venice International Film Festival
I soliti idioti: Il film	Enrico Lando	Francesco Mandelli, Fabrizio Biggio, Mădălina Ghenea	Comedy	
Some Say No	Giambattista Avellino	Luca Argentero, Paola Cortellesi	Comedy	
Someday This Pain Will Be Useful to You	Roberto Faenza	Toby Regbo, Marcia Gay Harden	Drama	
Tatanka	Giuseppe Gagliardi	Clemente Russo, Rade Šerbedžija	Drama	
Terraferma	Emanuele Crialese	Donatella Finocchiaro, Giuseppe Fiorello	Drama	
Things from Another World	Francesco Patierno	Diego Abatantuono, Valentina Lodovini	Comedy	
This Must Be the Place	Paolo Sorrentino	Sean Penn, Frances McDormand	Drama	Showed in competition at the 2011 Cannes Film Festival
Vacanze di Natale a Cortina	Neri Parenti	Christian De Sica, Sabrina Ferilli, Dario Bandiera	Comedy	
Wedding in Paris	Claudio Risi	Massimo Boldi, Biagio Izzo	Comedy	
What a Beautiful Day	Gennaro Nunziante	Checco Zalone, Rocco Papaleo	Comedy	
We Have a Pope	Nanni Moretti	Michel Piccoli, Nanni Moretti	Comedy	showed In Competition at the 2011 Cannes Film Festival
The Wholly Family	Terry Gilliam	Cristiana Capotondi	Fantasy	Short
The Worst Week of My Life	Alessandro Genovesi	Fabio De Luigi, Cristiana Capotondi	Comedy	

== See also ==
- 2011 in Italy
- 2011 in Italian television
