= ... E fuori nevica! =

- Theatrical release poster
- Directed by: Vincenzo Salemme
- Written by: Vincenzo Salemme
- Produced by: Luigi Musini; Valeria Esposito
- Starring: Vincenzo Salemme; Carlo Buccirosso; Nando Paone; Margareth Madè; Maurizio Casagrande; Giorgio Panariello; Paola Quattrini
- Cinematography: Fabio Olmi
- Edited by: Christian Lombardi
- Music by: Paolo Belli
- Production companies: Cinemaundici; Chi è di Scena
- Distributed by: Warner Bros. Pictures
- Release date: 16 October 2014
- Running time: 94 minutes
- Country: Italy
- Language: Italian
- Box office: $4.7 million

... E fuori nevica! is a 2014 Italian comedy film written, directed and starring Vincenzo Salemme, based on his 1995 play of the same name.

== Cast ==
- Vincenzo Salemme as Vincenzo "Enzo" Righi
- Carlo Buccirosso as Stefano Righi
- Nando Paone as Francesco "Cico" Righi
- Margareth Madè as vicina di casa cieca dei fratelli Righi
- Maurizio Casagrande as l'avvocato Saponetta
- Giorgio Panariello as Giacomo Furia
- Paola Quattrini as la sorella di Giacomo Furia
