= My Best Friend's Wife =

- Directed by: Vincenzo Salemme
- Written by: Vincenzo Salemme
- Produced by: Vittorio Cecchi Gori; Rita Rusic
- Starring: Vincenzo Salemme; Eva Herzigová; Carlo Buccirosso; Maurizio Casagrande; Nando Paone
- Cinematography: Italo Petriccione
- Music by: Antonio Boccia
- Distributed by: Cecchi Gori Group
- Release date: 1998
- Running time: 100 minutes
- Country: Italy
- Language: Italian

My Best Friend's Wife (Italian: L'amico del cuore) is a 1998 Italian comedy film written and directed by Vincenzo Salemme.

It marked the directorial film debut of Salemme, and enjoyed a considerable commercial success.

== Plot ==
Roberto Cordova is a middle-aged Neapolitan doctor who has to go to America for a major surgery. He is afraid he will die, so asks his friend Michele to let him sleep with his beautiful Swedish wife, Frida, as his last wish. Michele loves Frida, but agrees, and so does Frida.

Roberto's operation succeeds and he survives, but seven months later he discovers that Frida is pregnant.

== Cast ==
- Vincenzo Salemme as Roberto Cordova
- Carlo Buccirosso as Michele Seta
- Maurizio Casagrande as Father Leonardo
- Eva Herzigová as Frida
- Nando Paone as Geremia
- Biagio Izzo as Gioacchino
