= Amore a prima vista =

1999 film

- Directed by: Vincenzo Salemme
- Screenplay by: Vincenzo Salemme
- Produced by: Vittorio Cecchi Gori
- Starring: Vincenzo Salemme; Maurizio Casagrande; Carlo Buccirosso
- Cinematography: Mauro Marchetti
- Edited by: Patrizio Marone
- Music by: Pino Daniele
- Release date: 1999
- Country: Italy
- Language: Italian

Amore a prima vista ('Love at first sight') is a 1999 comedy film written and directed by Vincenzo Salemme.

== Cast ==
- Vincenzo Salemme as Bruno Garramone
- Maurizio Casagrande as Fortunato Cipolletta
- Carlo Buccirosso as Peppino Batman
- Biagio Izzo as Samuele Sandokan
- Mandala Tayde as Roberta
- Nando Paone as Mr. Centocelle
- Tosca D'Aquino as Nina
- Francesca Antonelli as Ombretta
- Antonio Casagrande as Don Natale Garramone
- Linda Moretti as Donna Carmela
- Luigi Maria Burruano as Don Antonio
- Sergio Vastano as Mago Morris
- Enzo Cannavale as Cannibal
- Teresa Del Vecchio as Speranza
- Bruno Arena as Delinquent
- Stefano Pesce as Carabiniere

== Production ==
The film was produced by Cecchi Gori Entertainment Europa. Salemme got inspiration for the film from the killing of a boy who had been in a relationship with the son of a Camorra boss. Principal photography started on 8 June 1999. It was shot in Rome.

== Reception ==
La Repubblica film critic Roberto Nepoti panned the film, describing it as a film in which 'every situation is facile, predictable, unashamedly pandering to the most degraded taste'. Lietta Tornabuoni described the film as a 'ramshackle farce', but praised the acting performances of Carlo Buccirosso and Enzo Cannavale.

The film was a box office success, grossing about 8 billion lire. The film received a Nastro d'Argento nomination for Best Score.
