= Freewheeling (film) =

Freewheeling -A ruota libera-
- Directed by: Vincenzo Salemme
- Written by: Vincenzo Salemme
- Produced by: Vittorio Cecchi Gori
- Starring: Vincenzo Salemme; Sabrina Ferilli; Carlo Buccirosso; Manuela Arcuri; Massimo Ceccherini
- Cinematography: Mauro Marchetti
- Edited by: Patrizio Marone
- Music by: Antonio Boccia
- Release date: 2000
- Running time: 81 min
- Country: Italy
- Language: Italian

Freewheeling (Italian: A ruota libera) is a 2000 Italian comedy film written, directed and starred by Vincenzo Salemme.

== Plot ==
Pericle Caruso lives in Naples and is in a wheelchair because of a bad surgery in the hospital. Pericle intends to sue the rich owner of the clinic: a stingy and cruel baron, and so he falls on purpose for his wife...

== Cast ==
- Vincenzo Salemme as Pericle Caruso
- Carlo Buccirosso as Mario Pecorella
- Sabrina Ferilli as Silvia
- Manuela Arcuri as Maria Grazia
- Maurizio Casagrande as Lawyer Cardamone
- Massimo Ceccherini as Natalizia
- Nando Paone as Beatrice
