= Margareth Madè =

Italian model and actress

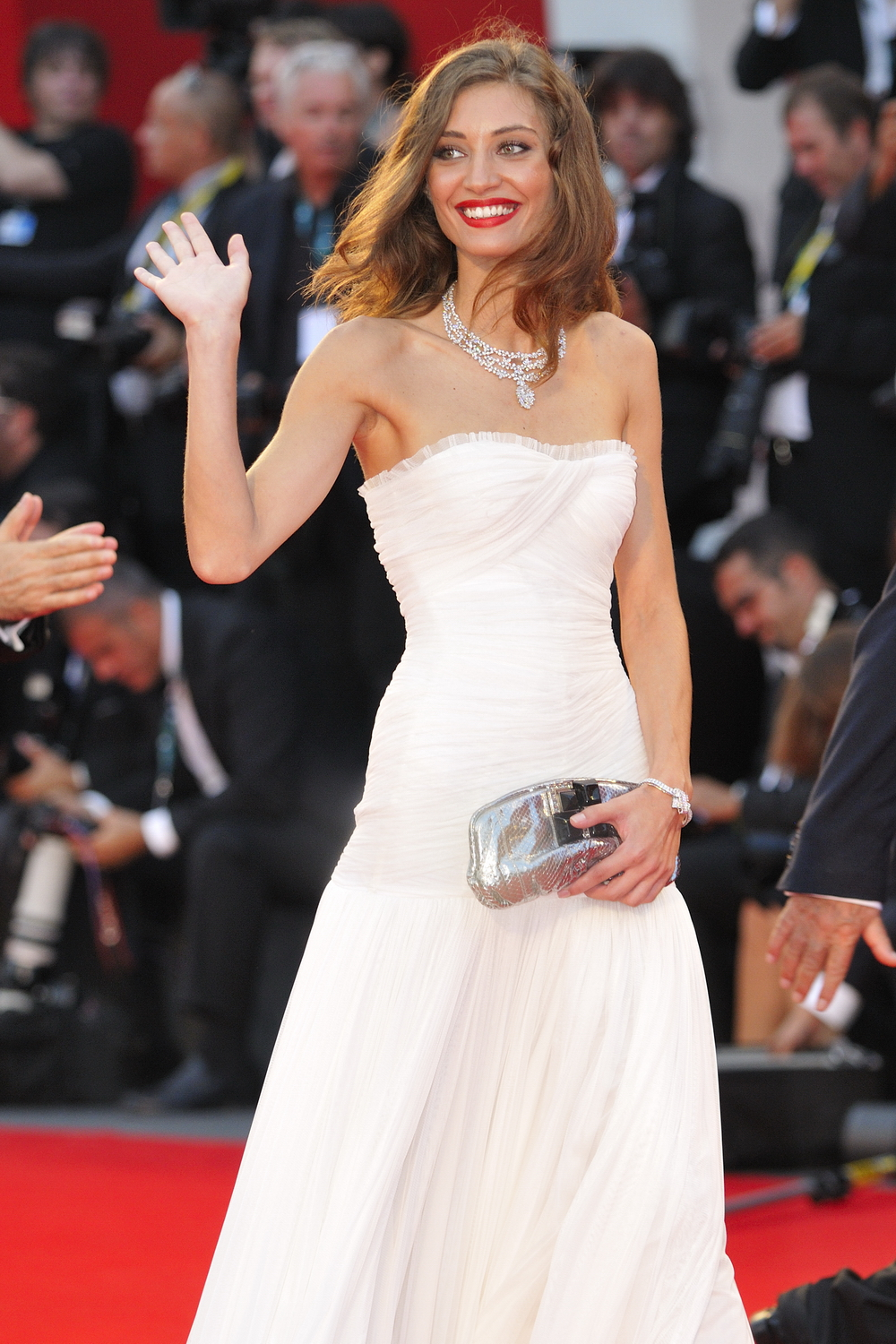
- Madè at the 2009 Venice International Film Festival
- Born: Margareth Tamara Maccarrone; 22 June 1982 (age 44); Paternò, Catania, Italy
- Occupations: Model; actress
- Spouse: Giuseppe Zeno (m. 2016)
- Children: 2

Margareth Tamara Maccarrone (born 22 June 1982), known professionally as Margareth Madè, is an Italian actress and former model.

== Early and personal life ==
Madè was born Margareth Tamara Maccarrone in Paternò, Sicily, to an Italian father and an Egyptian mother. They separated when she was 8, and Madè grew up between Adrano and Pachino. She uses a stage name because her surname is associated with pasta brands.

On 20 August 2016, Madè married fellow Italian actor Giuseppe Zeno in a Catholic wedding ceremony. The couple has two daughters: Angelica (born 8 November 2017) and Beatrice (born 4 September 2020).

== Career ==
Madè began her modeling career at the age of 15 and, in 2000, won WhyNot Agency's New Model Today contest in Milan. She has appeared on international fashion shows and television programs such as Donna sotto le stelle (2000/2002) and La Kore (2002), both broadcast by Rai Uno.

Madè made her film debut as Mannina in Giuseppe Tornatore's Baarìa (2008). She played Sophia Loren in the miniseries La mia casa è piena di specchi (2010).

== Filmography ==
=== Film ===
- Baarìa, directed by Giuseppe Tornatore (2009)
- Una donna per la vita, directed by Maurizio Casagrande (2012)
- ...E fuora, nevica, directed by Vincenzo Salemme (2014)
- Andròn: the Black Labirinth, directed by Francesco Cinquemani (2015)
- The Veil of Maya, directed by Elisabetta Rocchetti (2017)
- Il mio corpo vi seppellirà, directed by Giovanni La Parola (2021)

=== Television ===
- La mia casa è piena di specchi, directed by Vittorio Sindoni, Rai Uno (2010)
- Il paese delle piccole pioggie, directed by Sergio Martino (2012)
- Buio, directed by Nicolaj Pennestri, Canale 5 (2013)
- Il commissario Montalbano (Rai Uno), episode "Angelica's smile" (2013)
