= Aronica =

Aronica is a surname. Notable people with the surname include:

- Gaetano Aronica (born 1963), Italian actor
- Lou Aronica (born 1958), American editor and publisher
- Salvatore Aronica (born 1978), Italian football player and manager
