= Manuela Arcuri =

Italian actress, model and soubrette

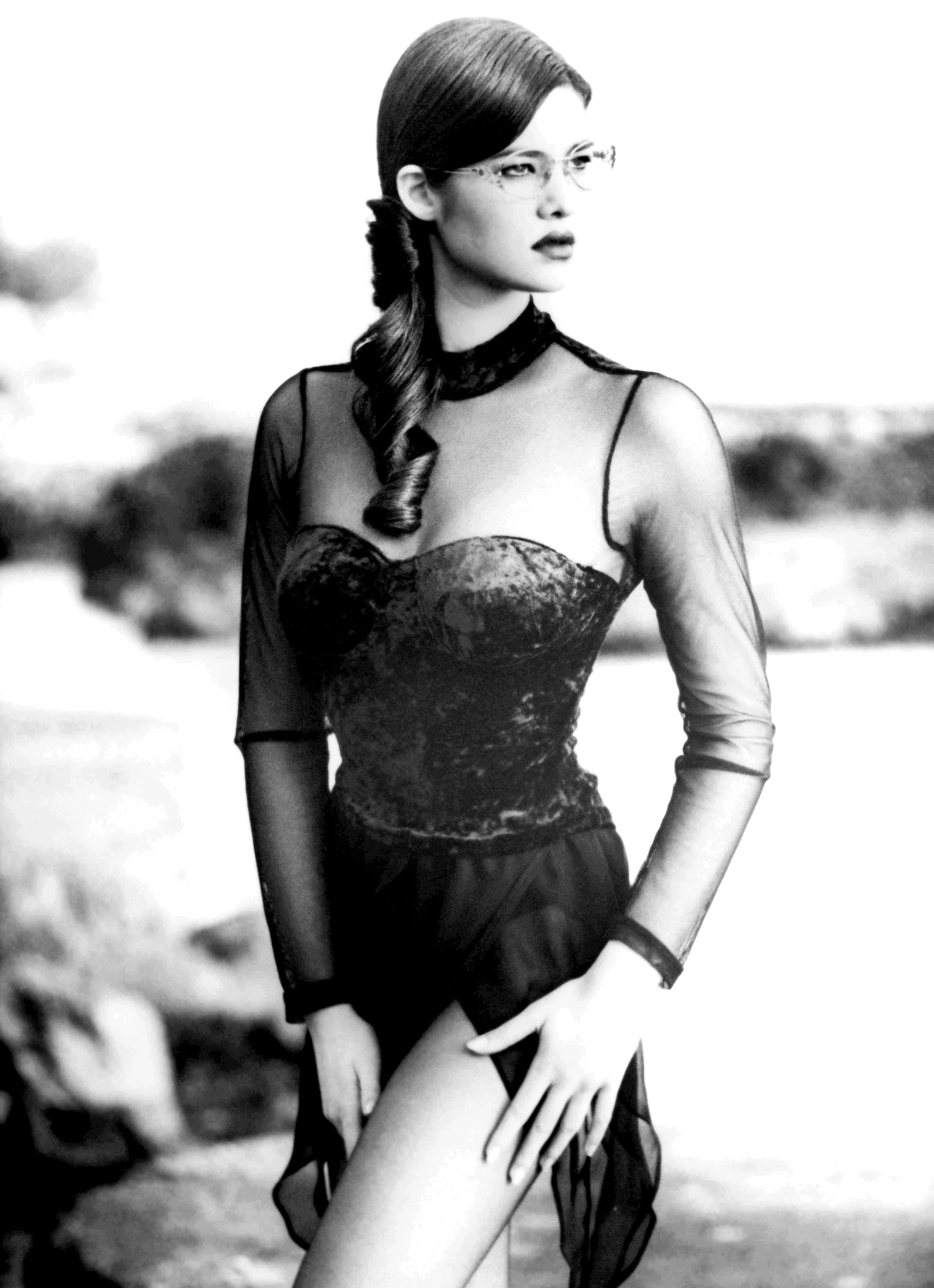
- Arcuri in 1995
- Born: Anagni, Frosinone, Italy
- Occupations: Actress; fashion model
- Years active: 1995–present
- Spouse: Giovanni di Gianfrancesco (m. 2022; div. 2025)
- Children: 1

Manuela Arcuri is an Italian actress and model. She's best known for starring in Canale 5 period drama series Il peccato e la vergogna (2008–2014).

== Early life ==
Manuela Arcuri was born in Anagni, near Frosinone, to a father from the Province of Crotone and a mother from Avellino.

== Career ==
In 1995 Arcuri appeared in roles in soap operas and in her first film, Black Holes. She then had a supporting role in The Graduates directed by Leonardo Pieraccioni, and a major one in the comedy film Bagnomaria by Giorgio Panariello, which brought her to the attention of the moviegoing public. She continued acting in other movies and stage productions, such as A Pretty Story of a Woman e Liolà at the side of Gianfranco Jannuzzo and under the direction of Gigi Proietti.

In 2000 Arcuri appeared in a calendar for the magazine GenteViaggi. The following year, she posed for another calendar, this time for the magazine Panorama. She then appeared in the TV series Carabinieri. In 2001 she hosted the TV show Mai dire Gol with Gialappa's Band. In 2002, she co-hosted the Sanremo Music Festival alongside Pippo Baudo and Vittoria Belvedere. In 2003, she co-hosted with Teo Teocoli and Anna Maria Barbera the eighth series of the TV comedy show Scherzi a parte.

== Theatre ==
- Liolà (2006)
- Il primo che mi capita (2008)
- A Pretty Story of Woman (2010)

== Filmography ==
Film roles showing year released, title, role played, director and notes
Title	Year	Role	Director	Notes
Diary of a Maniac	1993	Female vagabond	Marco Ferreri	Cameo appearance
The Graduates	1995	Dancer	Leonardo Pieraccioni	Cameo appearance
Black Holes	1995	Adelaide	Pappi Corsicato	
Viaggi di nozze	1995	Mara Sorci	Carlo Verdone	
Gratta e vinci	1996	Michelle	Ferruccio Castronovo	
Uomini senza donne	1996	Girl at café	Angelo Longoni	Cameo appearance
A spasso nel tempo	1996	Young Rosanna	Carlo Vanzina	
Cuori perduti	1997	Nicla Chiodi	Teresio Spalla	
Finalmente soli	1997	Christian's girlfriend	Umberto Marino	
Bagnomaria	1999	Mara	Giorgio Panariello	
Voglio stare sotto al letto	1999	Brunette girl	Bruno Colella	
Teste di cocco	2000	Nina	Ugo Fabrizio Giordano	
Freewheeling	2000	Mariagrazia Volpetti	Vincenzo Salemme	
Mad Love	2001	Aixa Beatriz	Vicente Aranda	
The Witch Affair	2003	Maria	José Miguel Juárez	
Non si ruba a casa dei ladri	2016	Lori Carlucci	Carlo Vanzina	

=== Television ===
Television roles showing year released, title, role played, network and notes
Title	Year	Role	Network	Notes
Disokkupati	1997	Angelina Forcella	Rai 2	40 episodes
Il gatto e la volpe	1997	Herself/co-host	Canale 5	9 episodes
Anni '60	1999	Laura	Canale 5	Episode: "Episode 3"
Pepe Carvalho	1999	Scherezade	Rai 1	Episode: "Alla ricerca Scherezade"
Mai dire Gol	2001	Herself/host	Italia 1	8 episodes
Sanremo Music Festival 2002	2002	Herself/co-host	Rai 1	Annual music festival
Carabinieri	2002–2003	Paola Vitali	Canale 5	48 episodes
Scherzi a parte	2003	Herself/co-host	Canale 5	13 episodes
Con le unghie e con i denti	2004	Barbara	Canale 5	2 episodes
Imperia, la grande cortigiana	2005	Imperia	Canale 5	Television film
Carabinieri: Sotto copertura	2005	Paola Vitali	Canale 5	2 episodes
Regina dei fiori	2005	Regina Proietti	Rai 1	2 episodes
L'onore e il rispetto	2006	Nella	Canale 5	6 episodes
Donne sbagliate	2007	Giulia	Canale 5	Television film
Caterina e le sue figlie	2007–2010	Morena	Canale 5	14 episodes
Io non dimentico	2008	Angela	Canale 5	2 episodes
Mogli a pezzi	2008	Elisa Negro	Canale 5	4 episodes
So che ritornerai	2009	Anna Gastaldi	Canale 5	Television film
Il peccato e la vergogna	2010–2014	Carmen Tabacchi in Fontamara	Canale 5	16 episodes
Sangue caldo	2011	Antonia Rosi	Canale 5	5 episodes
Pupetta - Il coraggio e la passione	2013	Assunta "Pupetta" Marico	Canale 5	4 episodes
Grande Fratello	2014	Herself/ Regular guest	Canale 5	13 episodes
Miss Italia 2017	2017	Herself/Judge	La7	Beauty contest
Il bello delle donne… Alcuni anni dopo	2017	Jessica Lolli	Canale 5	8 episodes
Ballando con le stelle	2019	Herself/ Contestant	Rai 1	10 episodes

=== Music video ===
Year	Title	Artist	Role
2007	"Somewhere here on Earth"	Prince	Dream Girl
