= Il ritorno del Monnezza =

- Directed by: Carlo Vanzina
- Written by: Piero De Bernardi; Carlo Vanzina; Enrico Vanzina
- Produced by: Vittorio Cecchi Gori
- Starring: Claudio Amendola
- Cinematography: Claudio Zamarion
- Edited by: Walter Fasano
- Music by: Andrea Guerra
- Distributed by: Variety Distribution
- Release date: 8 April 2005
- Running time: 90 minutes
- Country: Italy
- Language: Italian

Il ritorno del Monnezza (lit. 'The return of Monnezza') is a 2005 Italian poliziottesco-comedy film directed by Carlo Vanzina.

The film pays hommage to the 1970s poliziotteschi. The main character Rocky Giraldi, played by Claudio Amendola, is a combination of two of the most popular characters of the genre, Er Monnezza and Nico Giraldi, both originally played by actor Tomas Milian.

== Cast ==
- Claudio Amendola as Rocky Giraldi
- Elisabetta Rocchetti as Elisabetta Crocciani
- Enzo Salvi as Tramezzino
- Kaspar Capparoni as Salvatore Lamantia
- Gabriella Labate as Patrizia
- Paolo Triestino as the Questore
- Alessandro Di Carlo as Cesare
- Gianni Parisi as Chief Inspector Ramacci
- Roberto Brunetti as Caccola
- Mariano D'Angelo as Zagaglia
- Massimo Vanni as Gargiulo
- Luis Molteni as Bonini
- Andrea Perroni as Franchino
- Stefano Antonucci as Prof. Speroni
- Rolando Ravello as Vincenzo
- Stefano Ambrogi as Caterpiler
- Antonello Morroni as Er Bufera
