= Baciato dalla fortuna =

2011 Italian comedy film directed by Paolo Costella

- Directed by: Paolo Costella
- Produced by: Rita Rusic
- Starring: Vincenzo Salemme; Asia Argento; Nicole Grimaudo; Dario Bandiera; Alessandro Gassmann
- Cinematography: Enrico Lucidi
- Music by: Pasquale Catalano
- Release date: 2011
- Running time: 100 minutes
- Country: Italy
- Language: Italian

Baciato dalla fortuna is a 2011 Italian comedy film directed by Paolo Costella. It is based on the Vincenzo Salemme's comedy play Fiore di ictus. The film debuted at the second place on the Italian box office chart.

== Cast ==
- Vincenzo Salemme: Gaetano Peccerella
- Nicole Grimaudo: Grazia Tirelli
- Asia Argento: Betty
- Dario Bandiera: Nicola
- Alessandro Gassman: Silvano Grandoni
- Isabelle Adriani: Clara
- Elena Santarelli: Virginia
- Maurizio Casagrande: Impiegato Banca

== See also ==
- List of Italian films of 2011
