= Un'estate ai Caraibi =

2009 film by Carlo Vanzina

- Directed by: Carlo Vanzina
- Written by: Carlo Vanzina; Enrico Vanzina
- Starring: Gigi Proietti; Enrico Brignano; Carlo Buccirosso; Biagio Izzo; Martina Stella; Enrico Bertolino; Alena Seredova; Paolo Ruffini; Paolo Conticini; Jayde Nicole; Maurizio Mattioli; Sascha Zacharias
- Music by: Manuel De Sica; Luigi Mas
- Distributed by: Medusa Film
- Release date: 12 June 2009
- Running time: 110 minutes
- Country: Italy
- Language: Italian

Un'estate ai Caraibi is a 2009 Italian comedy film directed by Carlo Vanzina. It stars Gigi Proietti, Enrico Brignano, Carlo Buccirosso, Biagio Izzo, and Martina Stella.

== Plot ==
Several groups of Italians experience amusing adventures and tests of character on the Caribbean island of Antigua. Some of the characters are there simply for rest and relaxation, while others act with different motivations. Multiple plot lines unfold simultaneously as different characters' stories are presented.

== Cast ==
- Gigi Proietti as Alberto
- Enrico Brignano as Angelo
- Carlo Buccirosso as Roberto
- Biagio Izzo as Vincenzo
- Martina Stella as Laura
- Enrico Bertolino as Giacomo
- Alena Seredova as Anna
- Paolo Ruffini as Max
- Paolo Conticini as Tommy
- Jayde Nicole as Jennifer
- Maurizio Mattioli as Remo
- Sascha Zacharias as Britt
