= Carlo Buccirosso =

Italian actor, theatre director, and playwright

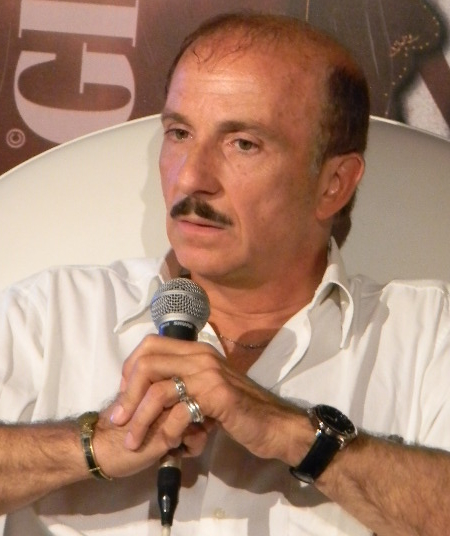
- Carlo Buccirosso at the 2010 Giffoni Film Festival
- Born: 7 July 1954 (age 72); Naples, Italy
- Occupations: Actor, theatre director, playwright
- Years active: 1976–present

Carlo Buccirosso (born 7 July 1954) is an Italian actor, theatre director and playwright.

As an actor, he is best known for his roles in comedy films, especially those directed by Vincenzo Salemme and Carlo Vanzina, in which he is often typecast as a stereotypical lower middle-class Neapolitan man. For his performance as corrupt politician Paolo Cirino Pomicino in Paolo Sorrentino's Il Divo (2008) he received critical praise and was nominated to David di Donatello for Best Supporting Actor. Buccirosso also appeared in Sorrentino's The Great Beauty (2013) and in popular TV series Un ciclone in famiglia (2006—2008) as Peppino Esposito.

In 2014, he won the Nastro d'Argento for Best Supporting Actor for his performance in crime-comedy Song'e Napule (2013). The following year, he won the David di Donatello for Best Supporting Actor for his performance in comedy The Legendary Giulia and Other Miracles (2015).

== Filmography ==
=== Film ===
Year	Title	Role	Notes
1989	L'ultima scena		
1993	Daddy Don't Blush	Brigadier Scarrafone	
1998	My Best Friend's Wife	Michelino Seta	
1998	Premiata pasticceria Bellavista	Ermanno Bellavista	
1999	Amore a prima vista	Peppino	
2000	Il grande botto	Michele Caldarulo	
2000	Freewheeling	Mario Pecorella	
2002	Horse Fever: The Mandrake Sting	Antonio Faiella	
2002	Il mare non c'è paragone	Professor Serapide	
2004	The Jokes	Rossi / Maniac	
2004	In questo mondo di ladri	Fabio	
2006	Really SSSupercool: Chapter Two	Beniamino	
2008	Il Divo	Paolo Cirino Pomicino	Golden Ciak for Best Supporting Actor; Nominated—David di Donatello for Best Supporting Actor
2009	The New Monsters Today	Carlo / Michele / Gregorio / Sotto	
2009	Un'estate ai Caraibi	Roberto De Paola	
2011	Petty Letters and Love Crimes	Warden	
2013	The Great Beauty	Lello Cava	
2013	Song'e Napule	Commissioner Vitali	BIFEST Award for Best Supporting Actor; Nastro d'Argento for Best Supporting Actor
2013	Guess Who's Coming for Christmas?	Antonio	
2014	People Who Are Well	Carabinieri Marshall	
2014	... E fuori nevica!	Stefano Righi	
2015	The Legendary Giulia and Other Miracles	Vito	David di Donatello for Best Supporting Actor
2016	Se mi lasci non vale	Alberto	
2016	Un paese quasi perfetto	Nicola	
2017	Mom or Dad?	Bertelli	
2017	La banda dei tre	Di Gaetano	
2017	Love and Bullets	Don Vincenzo / Francesco De Rosa	Nominated—David di Donatello for Best Supporting Actor
2017	Caccia al tesoro	Ferdinando	
2019	5 Is the Perfect Number	Totò o' Macellaio	
2019	Sono solo fantasmi	Carlo	
2022	Everyone on Board	Mario	
2026	Un tranquillo funerale di famiglia		

=== Television ===
Year	Title	Role	Notes
2006—2008	Un ciclone in famiglia	Peppino Esposito	17 episodes
2007	Two Cheaters and a Half	Commissioner Di Mauro	Television movie
2008	VIP	Concierge	Television movie
2010	Due imbroglioni e mezzo	Commissioner Di Mauro	4 episodes
2019—2023	Imma Tataranni: Deputy Prosecutor	Alessandro Vitali	18 episodes
