= Non si ruba a casa dei ladri =

- Film poster
- Directed by: Carlo Vanzina
- Written by: Carlo Vanzina; Enrico Vanzina
- Starring: Vincenzo Salemme; Massimo Ghini; Stefania Rocca; Manuela Arcuri
- Cinematography: Enrico Lucidi
- Edited by: Luca Montanari
- Music by: Giuliano Taviani; Carmelo Travia
- Release date: 3 November 2016
- Running time: 93 minutes
- Country: Italy
- Language: Italian

Non si ruba a casa dei ladri (lit. 'Do not steal from the thieves' house') is a 2016 Italian comedy film directed by Carlo Vanzina.

== Cast ==
- Vincenzo Salemme as Antonio Russo
- Massimo Ghini as Simone Santoro
- Stefania Rocca as Daniela Russo
- Manuela Arcuri as Lori Carlucci
- Maurizio Mattioli as Giorgio Bonetti
- Teco Celio as Herr Muller
- Lorenzo Balducci as Michele
- Liliana Vitale as aunt Titina
- Barbara Ramella as Francesca
- Ria Antōniou as Demetra
- Ralph Palka as the banker
- Fabrizio Buompastore as Maronaro
