= Luca Calvani =

Italian actor (born 1974)

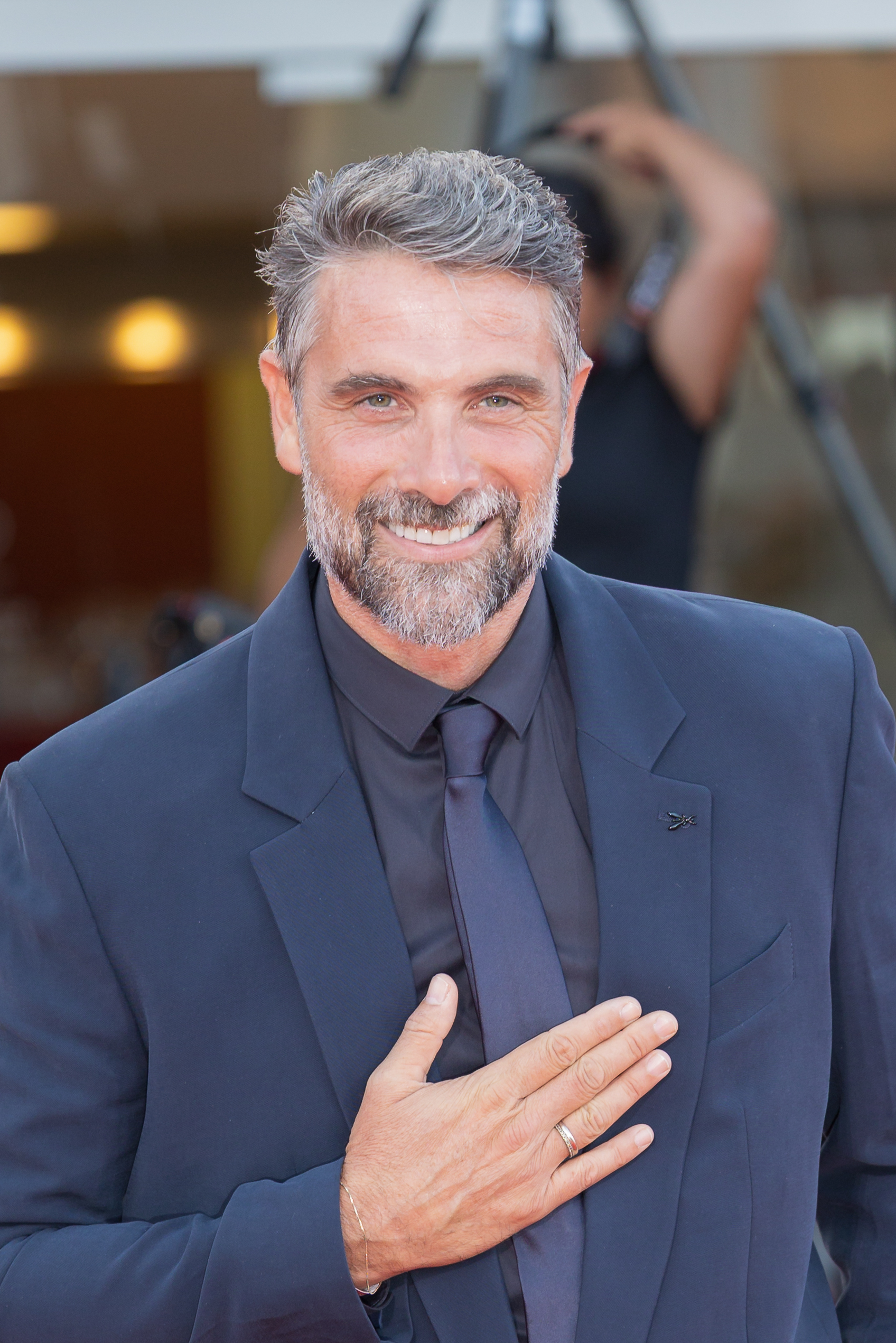
- Calvani in 2025
- Born: 7 August 1974 (age 52); Prato, Tuscany, Italy
- Occupation: Actor
- Years active: 2000–present

Luca Calvani (born 7 August 1974) is an Italian actor.

Calvani was born in Prato, Tuscany, Italy. Luca was a model during his teen years, working with top names in the world of fashion, including Giorgio Armani. Spent his twenties in New York City, where he first studied acting with Ron Stetson then with Susan Batson. Among his American TV roles, the HBO series Sex and the City (2001) where he starred opposite Alan Cumming and Sarah Jessica Parker, and as the villain Dante Grimaldi on CBS TV's daytime drama As the World Turns. In Europe, he worked in theatre, TV and film, among them Ferzan Özpetek's award-winning His Secret Life a.k.a. Le Fate Ignoranti. Calvani is trilingual, he speaks French and English in addition to his native Italian. In 2007 he shot Il Commissario Manara directed by Davide Marengo for the Italian network Raiuno. He co-starred as Enzo Calvini opposite Clive Owen in Tom Tykwer's movie The International and the upcoming Italian TV series Questo è Amore directed by Riccardo Milani opposite Stefania Rocca.

== Career ==
=== Theatre ===
- Sangue del mio sangue, dir. Maria Luisa Bigai (2007)

== Personal life ==
On 30 June 2022 Luca came out and revealed that he and Alessandro Franchini, an entrepreneur also from Tuscany (Viareggio), have been in a relationship since 2016. The two wed on September 29, 2024.

== Filmography ==
=== Film ===
- At the Right Moment, directed by Giorgio Panariello and Gaia Gorrini (2000)
- The Ignorant Fairies, directed by Ferzan Özpetek (2001)
- Absolutely Fabulous, directed by Gabriel Aghion (2001)
- Il diario di Matilde Manzoni, directed by Lino Capolicchio (2002)
- Il ronzio delle mosche, directed by Dario D'Ambrosi (2003)
- Parallel Passage, directed by Mandi Riggi (2003)
- Freezerburn, directed by Melissa Balin (2005)
- Sguardi controversi, directed by Corrado Veneziano (2006)
- The International, directed by Tom Tykwer (2008)
- When in Rome, directed by Mark Steven Johnson (2010)
- Men vs. Women (2010)
- The Man from U.N.C.L.E., directed by Guy Ritchie (2015)
- Shakuntala Devi, Hindi movie directed by Anu Menon (2020); played the role of Javier
- In the Fire, directed by Conor Allyn (2023)

=== Television ===
- Distretto di polizia, directed by Renato De Maria (2000)
- Sex and the City - Episode: The Real Me, directed by Michael Patrick King (2001)
- As the World Turns, various directors (2001)
- Quarto piano scala a destra, directed by Michele Truglia - Luca Calvani (2004)
- Carabinieri 4, directed by Raffaele Mertes (2005)
- La freccia nera, directed by Fabrizio Costa (2006)
- Cotti e mangiati, directed by Franco Bertini (2006)
- Un posto al sole (2007)
- Il commissario Manara, (miniseries) directed by Davide Marengo (2008)
- Effetto Sabato, a talk show on Rai Uno (2008–2009)
- The Bold and the Beautiful (2012–2013)
- A Good Season (2014)

=== TV appearances ===
- L'isola dei famosi 4 " a.k.a. Italian "Celebrity Survivor' - Winner (2006)
