= Baarìa =

Baarìa can refer to:

- Baarìa, Sicily, presently known as Bagheria
- Baarìa (film) (2009), film by director Giuseppe Tornatore
