= Un ciclone in famiglia =

Italian television series

- Cover of first season DVD
- Genre: TV series, comedy
- Created by: Carlo Vanzina
- Starring: Massimo Boldi; Barbara De Rossi; Maurizio Mattioli; Monica Scattini; Carlo Buccirosso
- Country of origin: Italy
- Original language: Italian
- No. of seasons: 4
- No. of episodes: 18

Production
- Executive producer: Carlo Vanzina
- Running time: 90 min

Original release
- Network: Canale 5
- Release: January 18, 2005 – 2008

Un ciclone in famiglia (literally translated A cyclone in the family or Family storm) is an Italian television series broadcast on Canale 5 in 2005, and ended in 2008 by Publispei and Mediaset. In England and America the series is unpublished.

== Cast ==
- Massimo Boldi: Lorenzo Fumagalli/Alberto 'Bebo' Marangoni
- Barbara De Rossi: Matilde 'Tilly' Beretta in Fumagalli
- Maurizio Mattioli: Alberto Dominici
- Monica Scattini: Simonetta Ricasoli della Ghirlandaia in Dominici
- Carlo Buccirosso: Giuseppe 'Peppino' Esposito
- Enio Drovandi: il fattore
- Margherita Antonelli: Margherita Esposito (st. 2)
- Ussi: Margherita Esposito (st. 3–4)
- Benedetta Massola: Lisa Fumagalli
- Sarah Calogero: Ludovica 'Ludo' Fumagalli
- Virginie Marsan: India Fumagalli
- Carlotta Mazzoleni: Laura 'Lauretta' Fumagalli
- Michele Bella: Adriano Dominici
- Edoardo Natoli: Alessio Dominici
- Paolo Stella: Antonio Esposito
- Mirko Batoni: Francesco
- Mita Medici: Barbara 'Bambi'
- Aom Flury: Hubertus von Taxis

== Song ==
The theme song of the fiction is entitled Chiedi aiuto a papi (literally translated Ask for help from daddy). During the opening, the images of the protagonists and the numerous professionals who contributed to the realization of the television series scroll.

== See also ==
- List of Italian television series
