= Sascha Zacharias =

Swedish actress (born 1979)

- Born: 23 February 1979 (age 46); Stockholm, Sweden
- Occupation: Actress
- Years active: 1986-present
- Parents: Sven-Bertil Taube (father); Ann Zacharias (mother)
- Awards: Ciak d'oro as best young actor emerging in 1997

Sascha Zacharias (born 23 February 1979 in Stockholm) is a Swedish television and film actress who developed her acting career in Italy.

== Biography ==
Born in Stockholm on 23 February 1979 to Sven-Bertil Taube, an actor and singer, Ann Zacharias an actress. She started to work as an actress when she was a baby and when she was 18 she came to Rome.

After appearing in many fictional television shows, she became better known with the TV show Raccontami, at Rai Uno. In 2006 and 2007, she acted in Caroline Desideri. She continued into the second series in 2008.

In 2011, she acted in the film Tatanka, under the direction of Giuseppe Gagliardi, taken from the Roberto Saviano novella and also in the film Anche se è amore non si vede (Also if it's love, it doesn't see) directed by Ficarra e Picone.

In 2019 she took the title role in the Swedish TV series Rebecka Martinsson. In the second season, she plays the former career attorney, who is now investigating as a public prosecutor in remote Lapland.

== Career ==
=== Filmography ===
- Dom fattar ingentig, director N. Janbell (1996)
- Il cielo in una stanza, director Carlo Vanzina (1999)
- Delitto in prima serata, director Alessandro Capone (2000)
- Kärlekens språk, director Anders Lennberg (2003)
- Il rabdomante, director Fabrizio Cattani (2007)
- Un'estate ai Caraibi, director Carlo Vanzina (2009)
- Tatanka, director Giuseppe Gagliardi (2011)
- Anche se è amore non si vede, director Salvatore Ficarra, Valentino Picone (2011)
- Folk med ångest (Anxious people, Gente Ansiosa, etc.), director Felix Hergren (2021)

=== Television ===
- Gli amici di Sara, director Gabriele Muccino - Minifiction about AIDS viewed at RAI and Mediaset (1999)
- Anni '60, actor Carlo Vanzina - TV Miniseries (1999)
- Questa casa non è un albergo, directors Pier Belloni, Elisabetta Marchetti and Raffaele Mertes - TV Series (2000)
- Tequila & Bonetti, director Bruno Nappi - TV Series - Scene: Uno sbirro, un cane e una fotografia (2000)
- Distretto di Polizia, director Renato De Maria - TV Series - Scene: L'agguato (2000)
- Noi, director Peter Exacoustos - TV Miniseries (2004)
- Questo amore, director Luca Manfredi - TV Miniseries (2004)
- Amanti e segreti, director Gianni Lepre - TV Miniseries (2004)
- Nassiriya - Per non dimenticare, director Michele Soavi - TV Miniseries (2006)
- Raccontami, directors Tiziana Aristarco and Riccardo Donna - TV Series (2006) Acting: Caroline Desideri
- Un ciclone in famiglia 3, director Carlo Vanzina - TV Miniseries (2007)
- Carabinieri 7, director Raffaele Mertes and Giandomenico Trillo - TV Series (2008)
- Raccontami - Capitolo II, director Tiziana Aristarco and Riccardo Donna - TV Series (2008) Acting: Caroline Betancourt
- Il commissario Manara, director Davide Marengo - TV Miniseries - Scene: Sogni di vetro (2008)
- I Cesaroni 3, director Stefano Vicario and Francesco Pavolini - TV Series - Scene: Basta crederci (2009)
- Intelligence - Servizi & segreti, director Alexis Sweet - TV Miniseries (2009)
- I delitti del cuoco, director Alessandro Capone - TV Miniseries (2010)
- Ho sposato uno sbirro 2, director Andrea Barzini - TV Series - Scene: Una figlia (2010)
