= The Star Maker (1995 film) =

L'uomo delle stelle (The Star Maker)
- Film poster
- Directed by: Giuseppe Tornatore
- Written by: Fabio Rinaudo; Giuseppe Tornatore
- Produced by: Rita Cecchi Gori; Vittorio Cecchi Gori
- Starring: Sergio Castellitto; Tiziana Lodato
- Music by: Ennio Morricone
- Production companies: Cecchi Gori Group; RAI-Radiotelevisione Italiana
- Distributed by: Variety Distribution; Cecchi Gori Distribuzione (Italy); Summit Entertainment (Overseas)
- Release dates: 7 September 1995 (Venice Film Festival); 22 September 1995 (Italy)
- Running time: 113 minutes
- Country: Italy
- Language: Italian

The Star Maker (Italian: L'uomo delle stelle) is a 1995 Italian film. It was produced by Rita Cecchi Gori, Vittorio Cecchi Gori, directed by Giuseppe Tornatore and starring Sergio Castellitto. It won the Grand Jury Prize at the Venice Film Festival. It was nominated for the Academy Award for Best Foreign Language Film.

== Plot ==
In 1953, petty fraudster Joe Morelli travels rural Sicily, claming to work for big Roman film studios and scamming aspiring actors by taking their screen tests for a fee. He meets several people who express their deepest feelings and secrets in front of the camera. At one of his stops he meets a young girl, Beata, a convent girl who becomes attached to him despite his protestations.

Joe and Beata's relationship gradually evolves into a romantic one, when he's exposed as a fraud, beaten, and arrested. After serving his prison term, Joe comes back to seek Beata, but finds her in a mentally disturbed state assuming Joe died. Pretending to be Joe's friend, he conveys to her a message that she was the love of his life, and promises he shall come back with money and take care of her.

== Cast ==
- Sergio Castellitto as Joe Morelli (Giuseppe Romolo)
- Tiziana Lodato as Beata
- Leopoldo Trieste as The Mute
- Leo Gullotta as Vito
- Franco Scaldati as Brigadiere Mastropaolo
- Salvatore Billa as The Prince
- Jane Alexander as The Princess
- Clelia Rondinella as Anna's Mother
- Tony Sperandeo as Primo Badalamenti
- Tano Cimarosa as Bordanaro

== Production ==
Tornatore initially imagined the main character as an American stranded in Italy, and considered casting Joe Pesci. However, the negative reception of his film A Pure Formality prompted him to shoot his next project as soon as possible. At the time, Pesci was unavailable for a long period as he was filming Casino; Tornatore subsequently rewrote the protagonist as an Italian, and the role went to Sergio Castellitto. Lead actress Tiziana Lodato said she was still a minor when filming began, but had turned 18 by the time she filmed the explicit sex scene with Castellitto.

== Release ==
Following its success at the Venice Film Festival, the film was released on 22 September 1995 in Italy, grossing $371,000 in its opening weekend from 49 screens in Italy's key cities.

== Reception ==
The Star Maker has an approval rating of 75% on review aggregator website Rotten Tomatoes, based on 12 reviews, and an average rating of 6.5/10.

== See also ==
- List of submissions to the 68th Academy Awards for Best Foreign Language Film
- List of Italian submissions for the Academy Award for Best Foreign Language Film
