= At the Right Moment =

2000 film

- Italian: Al momento giusto
- Directed by: Giorgio Panariello; Gaia Gorrini
- Written by: Giorgio Panariello; Andrea Dal Monte; Carlo Pistarino
- Produced by: Vittorio Cecchi Gori
- Starring: Giorgio Panariello; Kasia Smutniak; Giovanni Cacioppo; Carlo Pistarino; Luisa Corna
- Cinematography: Paolo Carnera
- Edited by: Antonio Siciliano
- Music by: Paolo Belli
- Release date: October 27, 2000
- Running time: 95 minutes
- Country: Italy
- Language: Italian

At the Right Moment (Italian: Al momento giusto) is a 2000 Italian comedy film written and directed by Giorgio Panariello.

== Synopsis ==
The film narrates the story of a local news reporter who became popular after filming live the sudden collapse of the Leaning Tower of Pisa.

== Cast ==
- Giorgio Panariello as Livio Perozzi
- Kasia Smutniak as Serena
- Luisa Corna as Lara
- Giovanni Cacioppo as Gaetano
- Carlo Pistarino as Pacini
- Evelina Gori as granma Caterina
- Athina Cenci as chief of Tele Luna
- Riccardo Garrone as TG director
- Andrea Buscemi as Calboli
- Luca Calvani as Brad Klein
- Gianni Zullo as Kurt Harbacht
