= Veil of Maya (disambiguation) =

Veil of Maya could refer to:

- A Buddhist or Hinduist belief about the world; see Maya (illusion)
- Veil of Maya, an American metalcore band from Chicago
- "Veil of Maya", a song by American progressive metal/rock band Cynic from their 1993 album Focus
- The Veil of Maya, a 2017 Italian romantic comedy-drama film
- "The Veils of Maya", a poem by George William Russell
