= Questa casa non è un albergo =

- Country of origin: Italy
- Original language: Italian
- No. of seasons: 1
- No. of episodes: 12

Original release
- Network: Rete 4
- Release: 2000

Questa casa non è un albergo (This house is not a hotel) is an Italian television series. It is also known as Amo Costanza ma senza speranza (I love Costanza, albeit hopelessly).

== Cast ==
- Sabina Ciuffini: Anna Donati
- Sergio Bini Bustric: Francesco Donati
- Nicole Grimaudo: Costanza Donati
- Irene Ferri: Valentina Donati
- Anna Iuzzolini: Lorenza Donati
- Alessandro Zamattio: Nino Donati
- Novello Novelli: Nonno
- Cristina Ascani: Zia Titti
- Sascha Zacharias: Lotte

== See also ==
- List of Italian television series
