= Our Country (film) =

- Directed by: Francesca Comencini
- Written by: Francesca Comencini; Franco Bernini
- Starring: Valeria Golino; Luca Zingaretti; Giuseppe Battiston; Laura Chiatti; Luca Argentero
- Cinematography: Luca Bigazzi
- Edited by: Massimo Fiocchi
- Music by: Banda Osiris
- Release date: 3 November 2006
- Language: Italian

Our Country (Italian: A casa nostra) is a 2006 Italian drama film directed by Francesca Comencini. It entered the competition at the 2006 Rome Film Festival.

== Cast ==
- Luca Zingaretti: Ugo
- Valeria Golino: Rita
- Laura Chiatti: Elodie
- Luca Argentero: Gerry
- Valentina Lodovini: Wife of Gerry
- Bebo Storti: Glauco Bottini
- Giuseppe Battiston: Otello
- Fabio Ghidoni: Matteo
