= The Life That I Want =

2004 film

- Film poster
- Directed by: Giuseppe Piccioni
- Written by: Linda Ferri; Gualtiero Rosella; Giuseppe Piccioni
- Produced by: Lionello Cerri
- Starring: Luigi Lo Cascio; Galatea Ranzi; Sandra Ceccarelli
- Cinematography: Arnaldo Catinari
- Release date: 1 October 2004
- Running time: 125 minutes
- Country: Italy
- Language: Italian

The Life That I Want (Italian: La vita che vorrei) is a 2004 Italian romantic drama film directed by Giuseppe Piccioni. It was entered into the 27th Moscow International Film Festival.

== Cast ==
- Luigi Lo Cascio as Stefano / Federico
- Sandra Ceccarelli as Laura / Eleonora
- Galatea Ranzi as Chiara / Vittoria
- Fabio Camilli as Raffaele
- Ninni Bruschetta as Luca
- Roberto Citran as Giordani
- Camilla Filippi as Monica
- Paolo Sassanelli as Diego
- Gea Lionello as Marina
- Sasa Vulicevic as Luciano / Conte

== See also ==
- List of Italian films of 2004
