= Eva Herzigová =

Czech model and actress (born 1973)

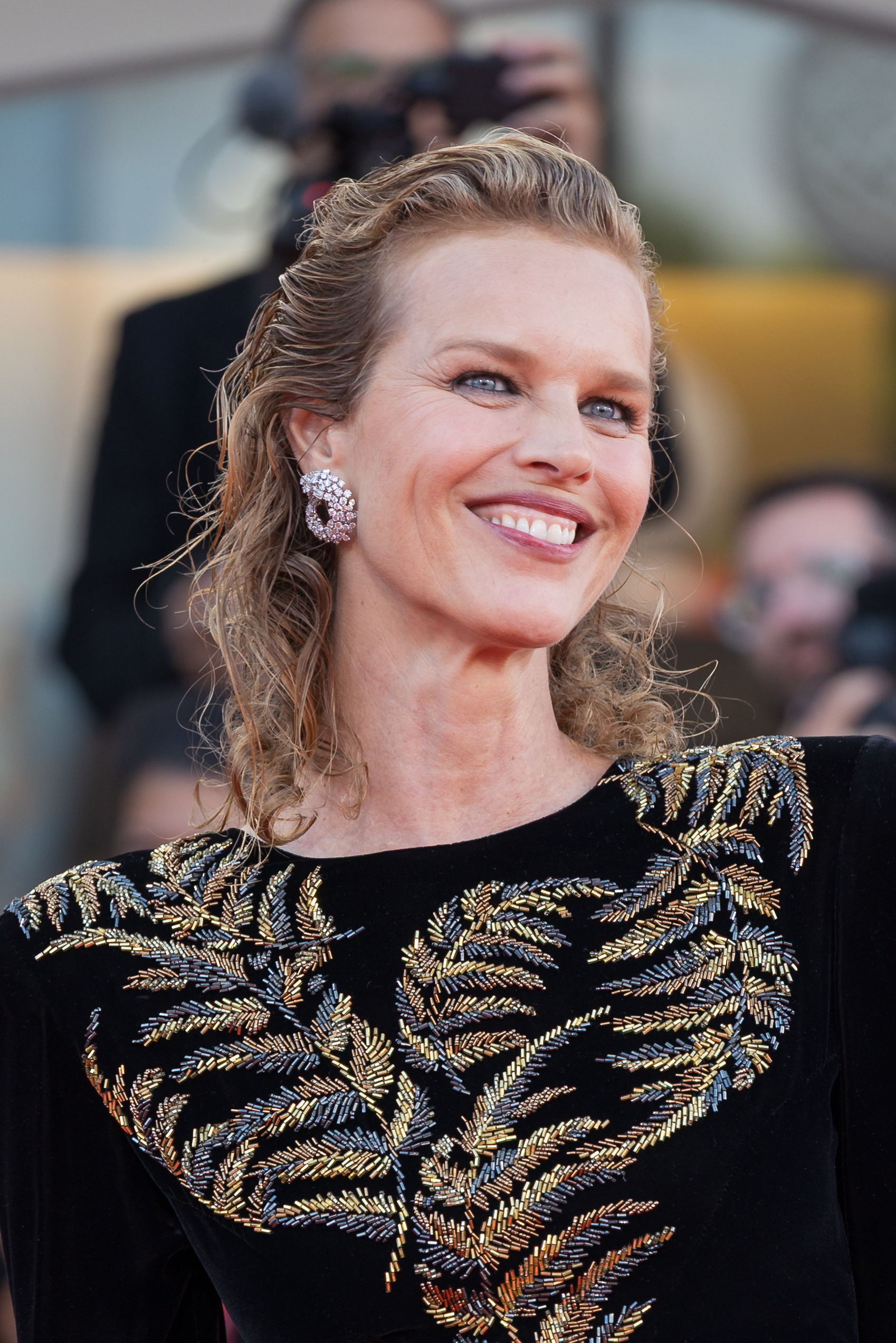
- Herzigová in 2025
- Born: 10 March 1973 (age 53); Litvínov, Czechoslovakia
- Occupations: Model; actress
- Children: 3
- Modeling information
- Height: 5 ft 11 in (1.80 m)
- Hair color: Light blonde
- Eye color: Blue-green
- Agency: Unsigned Group (London); The Lions (New York); ZZO (Paris); d'management group (Milan); Traffic Models (Barcelona); Scoop Models (Copenhagen); Mega Model Agency (Hamburg); Czechoslovak Models (Prague); Priscilla's Model Management (Sydney)

Eva Herzigová (Czech pronunciation: [ˈɛva ˈɦɛrzɪɡovaː]; born 10 March 1973) is a Czech model, actress, and fashion journalist. In 1994, she became the face of a Wonderbra campaign with the slogan "Hello Boys". Her height (5 ft 11 in or 1.80 m) and elegant appearance made her a sought-after model for fashion shows and campaigns of various renowned brands. Throughout her career, Herzigová has worked with leading designers and fashion houses including Dolce & Gabbana, Chanel, Versace, Louis Vuitton and has appeared on the covers of many prestigious fashion magazines such as Vogue, Elle, Harper's Bazaar, Marie Claire, Cosmopolitan, Glamour and many others. She became one of the prominent figures of the 1990s modeling and was one of the so-called supermodels along with Naomi Campbell, Cindy Crawford, Claudia Schiffer and Christy Turlington.

In addition to her modeling career, Herzigová has also appeared in film and television. She has starred in films such as Les Anges gardiens (1995) along Gérard Depardieu and Christian Clavier, My Best Friend's Wife (1998), Modigliani (2004) and A Prominent Patient (2017). Herzigová is editor-at-large of Vogue Czechoslovakia.

Her career as a model and her presence in public space have won her numerous awards and accolades. She remains a major figure in the fashion and entertainment industry.

== Early life and career ==
Herzigová was born in Litvínov, Czechoslovakia (now Czech Republic), the daughter of an accountant mother, Eva, and an electrician father. Growing up, Herzigová was athletic, "excelling in gymnastics, basketball, track and cross-country skiing." She began her modeling career at the age of 16 after winning a modeling contest organized by the French modeling agency Metropolitan Models in Prague in 1989, before she moved to Paris.

1994 ad for Wonderbra featuring Herzigová

After arriving in Paris, her popularity increased. Her first important appearance was as the model for the first Wonderbra campaign. In 1994, advertising executive Trevor Beattie, working for TBWA/London, developed an ad for Sara Lee's "Hello Boys" Wonderbra campaign. It featured a close-up image of Herzigová wearing a black Wonderbra. The ad used only two words: "Hello boys." The influential poster was featured in an exhibition at the Victoria and Albert Museum in London and it was voted in at number 10 in a "Poster of the Century" contest. The Canada-based lingerie fashion label wanted the ad campaign to motivate women to see the Wonderbra "as a cosmetic and as a beauty enhancer rather than a functional garment". The billboard was voted in 2011 as the most iconic outdoor ad during the past five decades by the Outdoor Media Centre.

She was also featured in Guess? jeans campaigns, the Victoria's Secret catalog and Sports Illustrated. Herzigová has featured in a variety of international fashion magazines, gracing the covers of Vogue, Harper's Bazaar as well as Elle, Marie Claire, Numéro and Allure. She has also walked for designers including Louis Vuitton, Benedetta Dubini, Giles Deacon, Emilio Pucci and Versace.

Herzigová also starred in a fashion art film by Imagine Fashion, called Decadent Control with Roberto Cavalli. It featured fashions by Agent Provocateur and H&M. Herzigová posed for the August 2004 edition of Playboy. In 2006, she portrayed Venus at the 2006 Winter Olympics Opening Ceremony. In 2013, Herzigová was chosen as the new model for Dior's Capture Totale line. She continued working with Dior into 2021. In 2016, Herzigová was one of those chosen to be spokesmodels for Giorgio Armani's New Normal Campaign.

== Activism and philanthropy ==
Throughout her career, Eva Herzigová has also been involved in philanthropic activities and awareness campaigns. In particular, she has supported health-related initiatives, working with the international organization DKMS, which focuses on fighting leukemia and encouraging bone marrow donation.

According to Herzigová, her involvement with the cause began after learning about the story of a child diagnosed with the disease, which led her to support campaigns promoting the importance of joining bone marrow donor registries.

Herzigová helped promote the campaign “Get Swabbed, Save a Life”, which aims to expand DNA databases to improve matches between donors and patients in need of transplants.

== Personal life ==
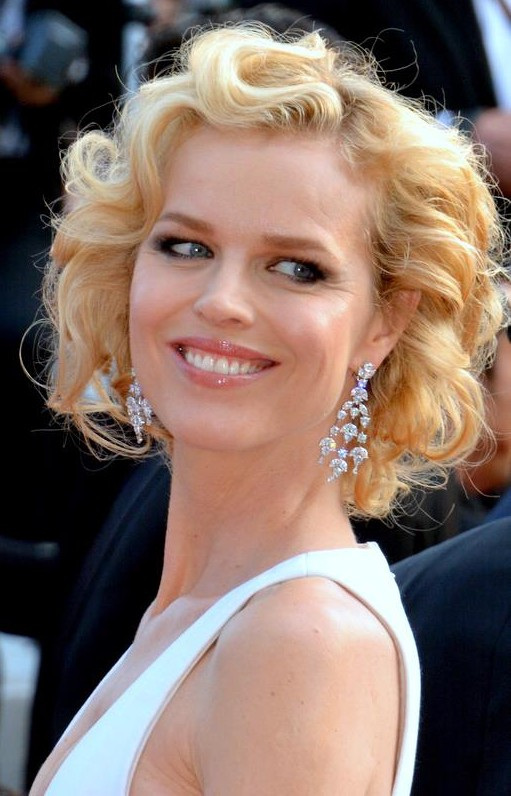
Herzigová in 2016

Herzigová married Tico Torres, the drummer from Bon Jovi, in September 1996 in New Jersey. The couple divorced in June 1998.

Herzigová has three sons with Italian businessman Gregorio Marsiaj: George (born 1 June 2007), Philip (born 13 March 2011) and Edward (born 20 April 2013). They live in Italy. In 2017, the couple became engaged. They married in Turin on 11 July 2026 with two different ceremonies, a Catholic one in St. Vito's church and a civil one in Palazzo Carignano.

Herzigová speaks Czech, Russian, English, French and Italian.

== Filmography ==
Title	Year	Role	Notes
Inferno	1992		TV film
Les Anges gardiens	1995	Tchouk Tchouk Nougat	
My Best Friend's Wife	1998	Frida Seta	
Just for the Time Being	2000	Christine	
Modigliani	2004	Olga Khokhlova	
The Picture of Dorian Gray	2005	uncredited	
Eva	2005	herself	short by Gaspar Noé
Girl Panic!	2011	Nick Rhodes	Duran Duran music video
Cha cha cha	2013	Michelle	
Storyteller	2014		
A Prominent Patient	2017		
La Maison	2024	herself	TV show (special appearance)
