= Pontormo – Un amore eretico =

Pontormo - Un amore eretico
- Directed by: Giovanni Fago
- Written by: Marilisa Calò; Massimo Felisatti
- Produced by: Angelo Bassi
- Starring: Joe Mantegna
- Cinematography: Alessio Gelsini Torresi
- Music by: Pino Donaggio
- Release date: 28 May 2004
- Running time: 95 minutes
- Country: Italy
- Language: Italian

Pontormo – Un amore eretico is a 2004 historical drama film by Italian director Giovanni Fago.

== Cast ==
- Joe Mantegna as Pontormo
- Galatea Ranzi as Anna
- Sandro Lombardi as Anselmo
- Massimo Wertmüller as Bronzino
- Laurent Terzieff as l'inquisitore
- Toni Bertorelli as il Priore
- Vernon Dobtcheff as Riccio
- Lea Karen Gramsdorff as moglie di Bronzino
- Andy Luotto as Mastro Rossino
- Valentina Fago as Tecla
- Alberto Bognanni as Cosimo I
