= The Legendary Giulia and Other Miracles =

- Theatrical release poster
- Directed by: Edoardo Leo
- Screenplay by: Marco Bonini; Edoardo Leo
- Produced by: Federica Lucisano; Fulvio Lucisano
- Starring: Luca Argentero; Edoardo Leo; Claudio Amendola; Anna Foglietta; Stefano Fresi; Carlo Buccirosso
- Cinematography: Alessandro Pesci
- Edited by: Patrizio Marone
- Music by: Gianluca Misiti
- Distributed by: Warner Bros. Pictures
- Release date: 19 February 2015
- Running time: 115 minutes
- Language: Italian

The Legendary Giulia and Other Miracles (Italian: Noi e la Giulia) is a 2015 Italian comedy film written, directed and starring Edoardo Leo. It is loosely based on the novel Giulia 1300 e altri miracoli by Fabio Bartolomei.

For their performances, Carlo Buccirosso and Claudio Amendola respectively won the David di Donatello for Best Supporting Actor and the Nastro d'Argento in the same category. The film also won the Nastro d'Argento for best comedy film.

== Plot ==
Diego, Fausto and Claudio are three men dissatisfied with their activities : the first is a car salesman from Turin who, also drained by his father's death, decided to change his life; the second is a Roman right-wing TV dealer who is full of debts; the third, also from Rome, has just brought down the centuries-old family grocery store and is now close to divorce.

Driven by their own failures, the three, after casually meeting to buy a farmhouse in the countryside, decide to refurbish the property and open a farmhouse together; then Sergio, one of Fausto's creditors and a militant communist, joins them.

Later we will add Elisa, a young pregnant woman called by Claudio to have a hand with cleaning and cooking, and Abu, a Ghanaian laborer.

Diego, Fausto, Claudio and Sergio are completing the renovation of the farmhouse when they receive a visit from Vito, a Camorrista who came to ask for the lace driving an Alfa Romeo Giulia 1300; Sergio does not hesitate to spread it with a punch and the four, finding no other solution, decide to seize it and enclose it in the basement of the farmhouse, while the car is made to disappear, buried. Soon the four realize they have left the keys in the picture and that the car's stereo, defective, part of his will.

A few days later two other boys arrive to ask for lace, but they too suffer the same fate as Vito. Meanwhile, he offers to help them. In time, customers also arrive, attracted also by the legend invented by Diego to justify the music coming from the buried car.

The situation precipitates when the superior of Vito comes to ask for the lace escorted by a stooge, who a few days later returns to collect: he too is seized. Subsequently, with a stratagem, the four Camorrists manage to free themselves and enclose the four partners in the cellar with Elisa. But Vito allows them a daring escape aboard his own Alfa Giulia, unearthed thanks also to Abu and his friends.

== Cast ==
- Luca Argentero as Diego
- Edoardo Leo as Fausto
- Stefano Fresi as Claudio
- Claudio Amendola as Sergio
- Anna Foglietta as Elisa
- Carlo Buccirosso as Vito
- Mattia Sbragia as Diego's Father
- Ernesto Mahieux as Camorra Boss

== See also ==
- List of Italian films of 2015
