= Eighteen: The World at My Feet =

- Italian: Diciottanni - Il mondo ai miei piedi
- Directed by: Elisabetta Rocchetti
- Written by: Elisabetta Rocchetti; Chiara Cavallari
- Starring: Marco Rulli
- Cinematography: Raoul Torresi
- Edited by: Barbara De Mori
- Music by: M-Feel
- Release dates: 2 October 2010 (Siena); 29 April 2011 (Italy)
- Running time: 84 minutes
- Country: Italy
- Language: Italian

Eighteen: The World at My Feet (Italian: Diciottanni – Il mondo ai miei piedi) is a 2010 Italian drama film directed by Elisabetta Rocchetti.

The film premiered at the Terra di Siena Film Festival on 2 October 2010 and was theatrically released on 29 April 2011.

== Cast ==
- Marco Rulli as Ludovico
- Rosa Pianeta as Luisa
- Alessia Barela as Silvia
- G-Max as Luciano
- Nina Torresi as Martina
- Elisabetta Rocchetti as Giulia
- Monica Cervini as Debora
- Marco Iannitello as Luca
