= Sono solo fantasmi =

2019 Italian comedy film

- Theatrical release poster
- Directed by: Christian De Sica
- Written by: Nicola Guaglianone (story); Menotti (story); Christian De Sica; Andrea Bassi; Luigi Di Capua
- Starring: Christian De Sica; Carlo Buccirosso; Gianmarco Tognazzi
- Cinematography: Andrea Arnone
- Edited by: Francesco Galli
- Music by: Andrea Farri; Clementino
- Distributed by: Medusa Film
- Release date: 14 November 2019 (Italy)
- Running time: 94 minutes
- Country: Italy
- Language: Italian

Sono solo fantasmi (lit. 'They are just ghosts') is a 2019 Italian horror comedy film directed by Christian De Sica.

== Cast ==
- Christian De Sica as Thomas
- Carlo Buccirosso as Carlo
- Gianmarco Tognazzi as Ugo
- Leo Gullotta as the Sir
- Francesco Bruni as Dante
- Valentina Martone as Rosalia
- Gianni Parisi as the notary
- Claudio Insegno as the Egyptian
