= Galatea Ranzi =

Italian actress

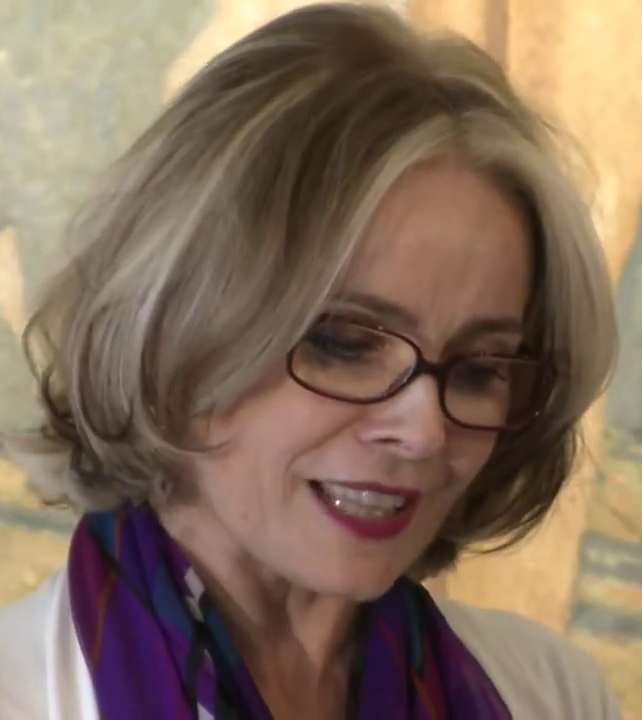
- Born: 24 January 1967 (age 59); Rome, Italy
- Occupation: Actress

Galatea Ranzi (born 24 January 1967) is an Italian film, stage and television actress.

== Life and career ==
Born in Rome, Ranzi studied acting at the Accademia Nazionale di Arte Drammatica Silvio D'Amico, graduating in 1988. She made her stage debut in 1987, in Luca Ronconi's Amor nello specchio, then she worked in numerous other productions directed by Ronconi, as well as in works directed by Cesare Lievi and Massimo Castri, among others.

Ranzi made her film debut in 1993, in Paolo and Vittorio Taviani's Fiorile, and for her performance she was nominated to Nastro d'Argento for best actress. In 2005, she was nominated to David di Donatello for best supporting actress thanks to her performance in Giuseppe Piccioni's The Life That I Want.

In 2014, she was nominated to David di Donatello for best supporting actress for her performance in Paolo Sorrentino's The Great Beauty.

== Filmography ==
=== Films ===
Year	Title	Role	Notes
1993	Fiorile	Elisabette / Elisa	
1996	Follow Your Heart	Ilaria	
1999	Appassionate	Caterina	
2001	Water and Salt	Ana	
2002	A Journey Called Love	Leonetta	
2003	Il pranzo della domenica	Susanna Papi	
2003	Caterina in the Big City	Livia	
2004	Three Steps Over Heaven	Raffaella	
2004	Pontormo	Anna	
2004	The Life That I Want	Chiara	
2005	Notte senza fine	Tripoli princess	
2005	The Fine Art of Love	Lady Helena	
2006	Lettere dalla Sicilia	Adult Penelope	
2007	Ho voglia di te	Raffaella	
2007	Come le formiche	Sveva	
2009	Aria	Clara	
2012	Un milione di giorni	Franca Florio	
2013	The Great Beauty	Stefania	
2015	What a Beautiful Surprise	Psychologist	Cameo appearance
2017	The Girl in the Fog	Stella Honer	
2019	Copperman	Gianna	
2019	Citizens of the World	Café woman	Cameo appearance
2020	L'aurora	Mother	Short film
2021	Lussu	Joyce Salvatori	
2022	Strangeness	The Mother	

=== Television ===
Year	Title	Role	Notes
1997	L'avvocato delle donne	Laura	Episode: "Laura"
1998	Avvocati	Gabriella	Episode: "Colpevole"
2004	Madame	Doris Tarlazzi	Television film
2006	La freccia nera	Livia	Main role
2014–2015	CentoVetrine	Emma Saint-Germain	Recurring role (season 15)
2018–2020	Baby	Elsa Altieri-Della Rocca	Main role
2020	Gli orologi del diavolo	Dr. Leone	Recurring role

== Awards and nominations ==
- 2005 nominated to David di Donatello for Best Supporting Actress for her performance in The Life That I Want
- 2014 nominated to David di Donatello for Best Supporting Actress for her performance in The Great Beauty
