= Caccia al tesoro =

- Theatrical release poster
- Directed by: Carlo Vanzina
- Written by: Carlo Vanzina; Enrico Vanzina
- Starring: Vincenzo Salemme; Carlo Buccirosso; Christiane Filangieri; Serena Rossi; Max Tortora
- Cinematography: Enrico Lucidi
- Edited by: Luca Montanari
- Music by: Giuliano Taviani
- Distributed by: Medusa Film
- Release date: 23 November 2017
- Running time: 90 minutes
- Country: Italy
- Language: Italian

Caccia al tesoro (lit. 'Treasure Hunt') is a 2017 Italian comedy film directed by Carlo Vanzina.

It was Vanzina's last film before his death in July 2018.

== Cast ==
- Vincenzo Salemme as Domenico Greco
- Carlo Buccirosso as Ferdinando
- Christiane Filangieri as Claudia
- Serena Rossi as Rosetta
- Max Tortora as Cesare
- Gennaro Guazzo as Gennarino
- Pippo Lorusso as the security guard
- Francesco Di Leva as O' Mastino
- Benedetto Casillo as don Luigi
- Paco De Rosa as Inspector Parisi
