= Carabinieri (TV series) =

- Genre: Police procedural; Crime drama; Comedy-drama
- Created by: Lorraine De Selle
- Starring: Ettore Bassi; Lorenzo Crespi; Pino Caruso; Martina Colombari; Manuela Arcuri; Francesco Giuffrida; Giampiero Lisarelli; Antonio Carli; Alex Partexano; Sergio Albelli; Andrea Roncato; Vincenzo Crocitti; Roberto Farnesi; Alessia Marcuzzi; Michael Reale; Luca Argentero; Maurizio Casagrande; Ines Nobili
- Country of origin: Italy
- No. of seasons: 7
- No. of episodes: 174

Production
- Running time: 50 mins.

Original release
- Network: Canale 5
- Release: March 12, 2002 – 30 July 2008

Carabinieri is an Italian police procedural comedy-drama television series on Canale 5. It aired from 2002 to 2008. The show follows the story of the military police (Carabinieri) barracks located in Città della Pieve.

== Cast ==
- Manuela Arcuri: Paola Vitali (s.1–2)
- Ettore Bassi: Andrea Ferri (s.1–4)
- Andrea Roncato: Costante Romanò (s.1–7)
- Alessandro Partexano: Antonio Mura (s.1–7)
- Lorenzo Crespi: Tommaso Palermo (s.1)
- Pino Caruso: Giuseppe Capello (s.1–2)
- Martina Colombari:Infermiera Gioia Capello (s.1–2, 6)
- Roberto Farnesi: Luigi Testa (s.2–4)
- Alessia Marcuzzi: Andrea Sepi (s.3–5)
- Luca Argentero: Marco Tosi (s.4–6)
- Walter Nudo: Giacomo Contini (s.6–7)
- Francesca Chillemi: Laura Flestero (s.6–7)
- Paolo Villaggio: Giovanni (s.1–5); Padre Paolo (s.7)
- Massimo Rinaldi: Maurizio Ranieri (s.1–2)
- Francesco Giuffrida: Leonardo Bini (s.1–4)
- Giampiero Lisarelli: Carlo Prosperi (s.1–5)
- Vincenzo Crocitti: Vittorio Bordi (s.1–6)
- Orso Maria Guerrini: Lorenzo Sepi (s.4–5)
- Ines Nobili: Barbara Fulci (s.5–6)
- Massimiliano Varrese: Antonio Baldi (s.5–7)
- Roberta Giarrusso: Sonia Martini (s.3–7)
- Maurizio Casagrande: Bruno Morri (s.5–7)
- Katia Beni: Tina (s.1–6)
- Erika Blanc: Gemma (s.1–6)
- Dario Vergassola: Pippo (s.1–6)
- Eleonora di Miele: Jessica (s. 1–5)
- Katia Ricciarelli: Monica (s.7)
- Lia Tanzi: Margherita (s.6–7)
- Valeria Cavalli: Sara de Nittis (s.5–7)
- Valentina Pace: Paola (s.6–7)
- Alessia Ventura: Roberta Dei Casati (s.7)
- Daniel Emilio Baldock: Venturi

== Episodes ==
Season	Episodes	Premiere	Finale
1	24	2002	2002
2	24	2003	2003
3	24	2004	2004
4	24	2005	2005
5	24	2006	2006
6	26	7 March 2007	6 May 2007
7	28	18 March 2008	30 July 2008

== See also ==
- List of Italian television series
