= Rita Rusić =

Croatian singer, actress and producer

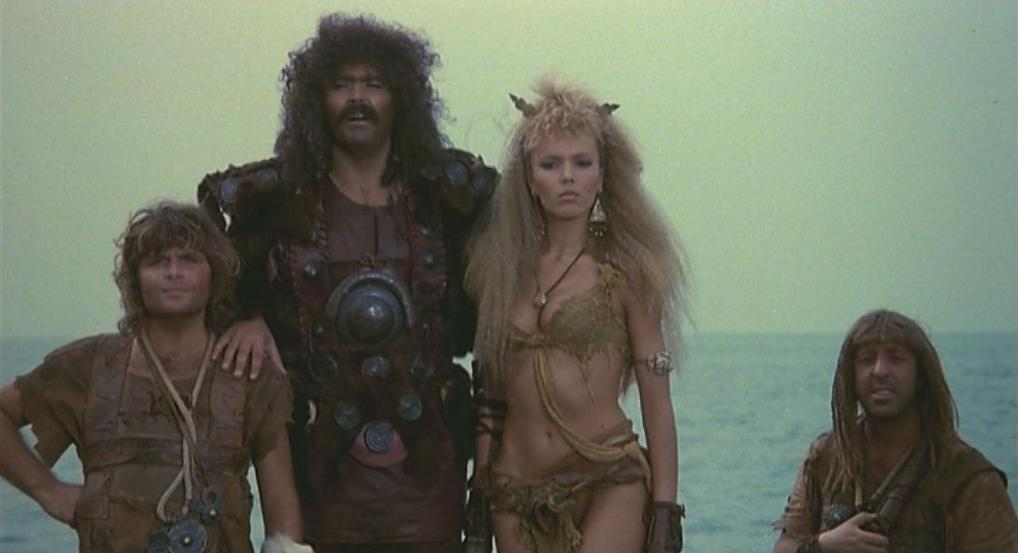
- Rusić with Diego Abatantuono in Attila flagello di Dio, 1982
- Born: 16 May 1960 (age 66); Poreč, PR Croatia, FPR Yugoslavia
- Other name: Rita Cecchi Gori
- Occupations: Film producer; actress; singer
- Years active: 1982–present
- Spouse: Vittorio Cecchi Gori (m. 1983; div. 2000)
- Children: 2

Rita Rusić (Italian: [ˈriːta ˈruːzitʃ], Croatian: [ˈriːta ˈruːsitɕ]; born 16 May 1960), also known as Rita Cecchi Gori, is a Croatian-born Italian producer, actress and singer. Rusić's career began as an actress with a major role in the 1982 film Attila flagello di Dio. She was eventually moved into the film industry, with Il pentito in 1982. Later that year she also began filming Joan Lui - Ma un giorno nel paese arrivo io di lunedì.

Following her work as a singer and an actress, Rusić became a producer in the early 1990s. Since then, she has been a recognised producer for over 80 films. Many of these films were released primarily in Italy, but a number of them had global success. Rusić also featured on the Italian version of Dancing with the Stars.

== Early life ==
Rusić was born in 1960 in Poreč, in the Istrian region of Croatia (then part of Yugoslavia).

Her parents belonged to the italian-speaking minority in Istria and they were forced to change their name from Rosselli to Rusic.

She moved to Italy when she was 4 years old.

In 1981, she met filmmaker Vittorio Cecchi Gori, whom she eventually married.

== Career ==
=== Model (1977–1981) ===
Rusić started her career as a fashion model at the age of 17. Her modelling career started in Milan, where she worked on mainly advertising campaigns for both magazines and television. Her modelling work led her to work for Fiat, Tampax, Timex and Cognac.

While she was working as a model, she was awarded the beauty pageant titles of Miss Santamarina and Miss Zelena Laguna. While studying medicine at the University of Milan, she met Vittorio Cecchi Gori and subsequently moved into the film industry.

=== Singer and actress (1982–1992) ===
Rusić's first notable film as an actress was the 1982 film Attila flagello di Dio. After acting in several other films during the 1980s, she began managing a film business with her husband Vittorio Cecchi Gori. Following her debut performance as an actress, Rusić moved into the music industry, releasing two singles in 1984 and 1985. Her debut single was Love Me or Leave Me Now. The following year, Rusić released her second single, titled Sex Without Love. The song featured on the soundtrack for the film Joan Lui - Ma un giorno nel paese arrivo io di lunedì, which she also starred in. The single was recorded with Adriano Celentano. In 1988, Rusić starred as Alexandra in the Italian-produced film, The Third Solution. The film is based on The Pope's meeting with the head of the Ukrainian Orthodox Church.

=== Becoming a producer (since 1993) ===
Rusić's next major role was as a producer in 1993 on the film Storia di una capinera, where she was Executive Producer. During the same year, she was also a producer on two other films, Arriva la bufera and Le donne non-vogliono più. In 1994, she worked as a producer alongside her husband on The Bull. The Italian comedy-drama film was directed by Carlo Mazzacurati and was awarded with the Silver Lion and the Volpi Cup for best supporting actor to Roberto Citran.

In 1995, Rusić produced the film, The Star Maker. The film was originally known as L'Uomo delle stelle in Italy, was directed by Giuseppe Tornatore, while the title role was played by Sergio Castellitto. It was nominated for the Academy Award for Best Foreign Language Film in its year of release.

Rusić produced the Italian science fiction film, titled Nirvana in 1997. It was directed by Gabriele Salvatores and starred Christopher Lambert, Diego Abatantuono, Sergio Rubini, and Stefania Rocca. It was also screened out of competition at the 1997 Cannes Film Festival. Rusić produced Il ciclone and Fuochi d'artificio, and was the domestic and international distributor of Life Is Beautiful, three-time Oscar winner: Best Actor, Best Music Score and Best Foreign Movie, best price of the jury in Cannes Film Festival, and best Italian movie by David di Donatello. Later that year she produced an adaptation film called On Guard, from the 1858 historical novel Le Bossu by Paul Féval. The film is about a skilled swordsman named Lagardère who is befriended by the Duke of Nevers. When the duke is attacked by his evil cousin Gonzague, the duke in his dying moments asks Lagardère to avenge him and look after his infant daughter. After divorcing Vittorio Cecchi Gori in 2000, Rusić became a producer on her own and founded the agency "The Rita Rusić Company". In 2006, she appeared as a leading actress in a TV series 48 Hours. In 2007, she also restarted her career as a singer.

In May 2008, Rusić published a book titled Jet Sex Diario erotico sentimentale, published by CHI Mondadori. In 2009, she went back to acting, appearing in the film Polvere by Massimiliano D'Epirus and Daniel Proietti, playing the part of the mother. She is the creator and writer of the first 12 episodes of the Italian TV series Amiche mie. She was on the jury of Miss Italia in 2009 and 2010. She participated as a guest in hundreds of TV shows, including as a judge in several episodes of the Italian version of Dancing with the Stars, replacing Fabio Canino. She also appeared in other reality shows, The Factory in 2006 and Thank God You Are Here in 2009.

== Filmography ==
Year	Film	Credits	Role	Notes
1982	Attila flagello di Dio	Actress	Uraia	as Rita Rusić
1985	The Repenter	Actress	Unknown	as Rita Cecchi Gori
1985	Joan Lui - Ma un giorno nel paese arrivo io di lunedì	Actress	Singer in the temple	as Rita Cecchi Gori
1988	The Third Solution	Actress	Unknown	as Rita Cecchi Gori
1993	Women Don't Want To	Producer	N/A	as Rita Cecchi Gori
1993	Sparrow	Producer	N/A	as Rita Cecchi Gori
1994	The Bull	Producer	N/A	as Rita Cecchi Gori
1994	Policemen	Producer	N/A	as Rita Cecchi Gori
1995	Love Story with Cramps	Producer	N/A	as Rita Cecchi Gori
1995	The Graduates	Producer	N/A	as Rita Cecchi Gori
1995	La scuola	Producer	N/A	as Rita Cecchi Gori
1995	Who Killed Pasolini?	Producer	N/A	as Rita Cecchi Gori
1995	The Star Maker	Producer	N/A	as Rita Cecchi Gori
1995	Viaggi di nozze	Producer	N/A	as Rita Cecchi Gori
1996	I'm Crazy About Iris Blond	Producer	N/A	as Rita Cecchi Gori
1996	Return to Home Gori	Producer	N/A	as Rita Cecchi Gori
1996	August Vacation	Producer	N/A	as Rita Cecchi Gori
1996	Strangled Lives	Producer	N/A	as Rita Cecchi Gori
1996	The Barber of Rio	Producer	N/A	as Rita Cecchi Gori
1996	Fantozzi – Il ritorno	Producer	N/A	as Rita Cecchi Gori
1996	The Cyclone	Producer	N/A	as Rita Cecchi Gori
1997	Ovosodo	Producer	N/A	as Rita Cecchi Gori
1997	Naja	Producer	N/A	as Rita Cecchi Gori
1997	Nirvana	Producer	N/A	as Rita Cecchi Gori
1997	Camere da letto	Producer	N/A	as Rita Cecchi Gori
1997	Banzai	Producer	N/A	as Rita Cecchi Gori
1997	Life Is Beautiful	Producer	N/A	as Rita Cecchi Gori
1997	Fireworks	Producer	N/A	as Rita Cecchi Gori
1997	On Guard	Producer	N/A	as Rita Cecchi Gori
1998	My Best Friend's Wife	Producer	N/A	as Rita Cecchi Gori
1998	Gallo cedrone	Producer	N/A	as Rita Cecchi Gori
1999	Lucignolo	Producer	N/A	as Rita Cecchi Gori
2000	Ogni lasciato è perso	Producer	N/A	as Rita Rusić
2001	Stregati dalla luna	Producer	N/A	as Rita Rusić
2002	Un amore perfetto	Producer	N/A	as Rita Rusić
2002	Angela	Producer	N/A	as Rita Rusić
2008	Scusa ma ti chiamo amore	Producer	N/A	as Rita Rusić
2009	Polvere	Actress	Mother	as Rita Rusić
2009	Sorry If I Want to Marry You	Producer	N/A	as Rita Rusić
2009	Baciato dalla fortuna	Producer	N/A	as Rita Rusić

== Discography ==
- Rita Rusić – Love Me Or Leave Me Now (1984)
- Adriano Celentano featuring Rita Rusić – Sex Without Love (1985)
