= Copperman (film) =

2019 Italian film

- Directed by: Eros Puglielli
- Screenplay by: Riccardo Irrera; Paolo Logli; Mauro Graiani; Alessandro Pondi
- Starring: Luca Argentero; Antonia Truppo
- Cinematography: Alfredo Betrò
- Edited by: Karolina Maciejewska
- Music by: Andrea Guerra
- Release date: 2019
- Language: Italian

Copperman is a 2019 Italian superhero drama film directed by Eros Puglielli and starring Luca Argentero.

== Plot ==
Anselmo, a mentally disable man, grew up believing that his father had abandoned his family in order to fight the evil injustices of the world. As he grows up, he decides to emulate him by becoming a superhero.

== Cast ==
- Luca Argentero as Anselmo / Copperman
- Antonia Truppo as Titti
- Galatea Ranzi as Gianna
- Gianluca Gobbi as Ernesto
- Tommaso Ragno as Silvano il fabbro
- Massimo Poggio as Giovanni
- Paolo Romano as Mario

== Production ==
The film was shot in Spoleto between July and September 2018.

== Release ==
The film was theatrically released in Italy by Notorious Pictures on 7 February 2019.

== Reception ==
La Repubblica critic Roberto Nepoti praised the Puglielli's touch, "that throughout the film retains a fairy-tale tone in tune with Anselmo's [film's main character] worldview", and marked the film as "gentle and in its own way courageous". Simone Emiliani from Sentieri selvaggi described it as a mix of genres, "full of interesting suggestions and insights" but "uneven", where the two main actors appear "at times lost in dealing with continually shifting registers".
