= Vai avanti tu che mi vien da ridere =

- Directed by: Giorgio Capitani
- Written by: Franco Marotta; Marino Onorati; Sergio Nasca; Laura Toscano
- Starring: Lino Banfi; Agostina Belli
- Cinematography: Giorgio Di Battista
- Edited by: Antonio Siciliano
- Music by: Piero Umiliani
- Release date: 1982
- Language: Italian

Vai avanti tu che mi vien da ridere (You go ahead, I'm cracking up with laughter) is a 1982 Italian crime-comedy film directed by Giorgio Capitani.

== Plot ==
Pasquale Bellachioma is an unsuccessful police detective, always chasing crime scenes with his sidekick officer Cavicchioni, even though the police radio explicitly tells them to stay away. Threatened with transfer to the remote and cold village of S. Vito in Trentino's mountains, he becomes desperate to score a success to maintain his job. By sneaking into a briefing, he discovers that his colleagues are looking for a German cross-dresser named Andrea Ritter ("Andrea" being a masculine name in Italian), who is the last surviving witness able to identify a killer that is after sheik Abadjan, the head of state of a middle Eastern oil country willing to break with OPEC and to sell cheap oil to the West, and who will visit Italy shortly. Bellachioma is able to track down Andrea, who is obviously a woman rather than a cross-dressing man, but this escapes Bellachioma, who keeps believing she is a man in drag. Bellachioma kidnaps her with the intention to use her as bait to capture the killer and scoring a major success, but doing this he goes rogue and is wanted by the police. With Cavicchioni's help, Bellachioma manages to infiltrate the gala dinner at which sheik Abadjan is being received, and fortuitously manages to save him from the killer's bullet, saving his career in the process.

During the course of the movie, Bellachioma feels gradually more attracted to Andrea, feelings he rejects as he believes she is a man in drag; she never corrects him, apparently enjoying the internal conflict she is causing, but eventually confesses him her true gender after they kiss. After Bellachioma saves the foreign head of state, Andrea runs away, as Bellachioma had briefly believed she actually was the killer. Bellachioma catches up with her outside a public bathroom, and delivers a passionate declaration through the door; when she allows him in, she asks him "Are you sure?" while standing in front of a urinal in the final scene.

== Cast ==
- Lino Banfi as Inspector Bellachioma
- Agostina Belli as Andrea Maria Ritter
- Nando Paone as Cavicchioli
- Pino Colizzi as Police Commissioner Giannetti
- Gordon Mitchell as The Killer
- Chris Avram as Sheik Abadjan

== See also ==
- List of Italian films of 1982
