= Solo un padre =

- Theatrical release poster
- Directed by: Luca Lucini
- Based on: Perfect Skin by Nick Earls
- Starring: Luca Argentero; Diane Fleri
- Cinematography: Manfredo Archinto
- Edited by: Fabrizio Rossetti
- Music by: Fabrizio Campanelli
- Production company: Cattleya
- Distributed by: Warner Bros. Pictures
- Release date: 28 November 2008
- Running time: 90 minutes
- Country: Italy
- Language: Italian
- Box office: $3,065,931

Solo un padre (also known as The Semi-Serious Adventures of a Single Father, Perfect Skin and Just a Father) is a 2008 Italian comedy-drama film directed by Luca Lucini. It is based on the novel Perfect Skin written by Nick Earls.

== Cast ==
- Luca Argentero: Carlo
- Diane Fleri: Camille
- Claudia Pandolfi: Melissa
- Anna Foglietta: Caterina
- Fabio Troiano: Giorgio
