= Tatanka (film) =

2011 Italian drama film

- Directed by: Giuseppe Gagliardi
- Cinematography: Michele Paradisi
- Music by: Peppe Voltarelli
- Release date: 2011
- Running time: 100 minutes
- Country: Italy
- Language: Italian
- Budget: €1,400,000

Tatanka is a 2011 Italian drama film written, directed, and starring Giuseppe Gagliardi. It is based on the short story "Tatanka scatenato" by Roberto Saviano.

The film marked the acting debut of the boxer Clemente Russo; after his participation in the film Russo, who is a member of the Gruppo Sportivo Fiamme Oro, was suspended for a period of six months from the Polizia di Stato. According to some sources, Russo was punished because of some explicit scenes that could have damaged the image of the police, but these circumstances were denied by the State Police which claimed that the suspension derived from the lack of authorizations and permissions to participate in the film.

The film was nominated to three Nastro d'Argento Awards, for Best Supporting Actor (Giorgio Colangeli), Best Cinematography and Best Sound.

== Plot ==
Michele and Rosario, childhood friends, grow up in Marcianise, a town in Campania where the laws of the Camorra prevail over those of the State. Engaged in theft and robbery since their youth, they take refuge in a gym while fleeing the police; the owner, Sabatino, shields them and notices Michele's boxing talent following a brawl with another boy. Later, Rosario gets into an altercation on the beach with some youths who retaliate by beating him up outside his home. Rosario fights back, wounding one of them with a knife, and is subsequently convicted of assault. Meanwhile, Michele begins training at Sabatino’s gym; Sabatino arranges boxing matches for him and instills in him the dream of competing in the Olympics. During one of the matches, Michele earns the nickname "Tatanka." Sabatino arranges a meeting with an inspector friend to facilitate Michele's entry into the *Fiamme Oro* (the State Police sports team), but Michele fails to show up; instead, he is drawn by Rosario—who has just been released—into a plot to take revenge on the boy who had reported him. The two break into the boy's father's warehouse but are surprised by a security guard, who forces Michele to remove the stocking covering his face.

Rosario disarms and ultimately kills the guard because the man had recognized his friend; however, due to security camera footage, Michele is sentenced to eight years for robbery and complicity in murder, shielding Rosario to the very end.

Michele continues training in prison and still dreams of making it big in boxing. With the help of Rosario—who is now in league with the Camorra boss Don Salvatore Vitiello—he restores Sabatino’s gym and returns to the ring with great success. In reality, however, Rosario merely wants to exploit his friend and asks him to throw a match, as heavy bets have been placed against him. Michele refuses to carry out the order; to escape Don Salvatore's vengeance, he flees to Germany to stay with Carolina, a woman with whom he had previously been involved.

Michele helps Carolina run her establishment and works as a waiter, but the call of boxing remains; this time, it manifests as underground bare-knuckle fights, in which he begins to participate. During one of these bouts, a police raid takes place, and Michele narrowly avoids arrest thanks to Vinko. Vinko points out that, despite his power and rage, Michele lacks proper technique, and he begins to train him. Later, he enters Michele in an underground boxing tournament, which Michele wins.

Upon returning to Italy for his grandfather's funeral, Michele meets up with Sabatino. He expresses his desire to stay in Italy and compete in the Olympics, noting that his boxing skills have improved. Later, Rosario approaches him and asks to have a drink together. Michele initially suspects that Rosario has come to kill him, but that is not the case: Rosario kills the men accompanying him but is himself shot, dying in his friend's arms. Michele continues to box and pursue his dream, keeping Rosario's memory alive.

== Cast ==
- Clemente Russo as Michele
- Rade Šerbedžija as Vinko
- Carmine Recano as Rosario
- Giorgio Colangeli as Sabatino
- Suzanne Wolff as Petra
- Sascha Zacharias as Caroline
- Raiz as Salvatore Vitiello

== Production ==
The film was produced with the contribution of the Ministry of Cultural Heritage, which allocated 1,400,000 euros.

== See also ==
- List of Italian films of 2011
