= Benedetta Dubini =

British jewellery designer (born 1987)

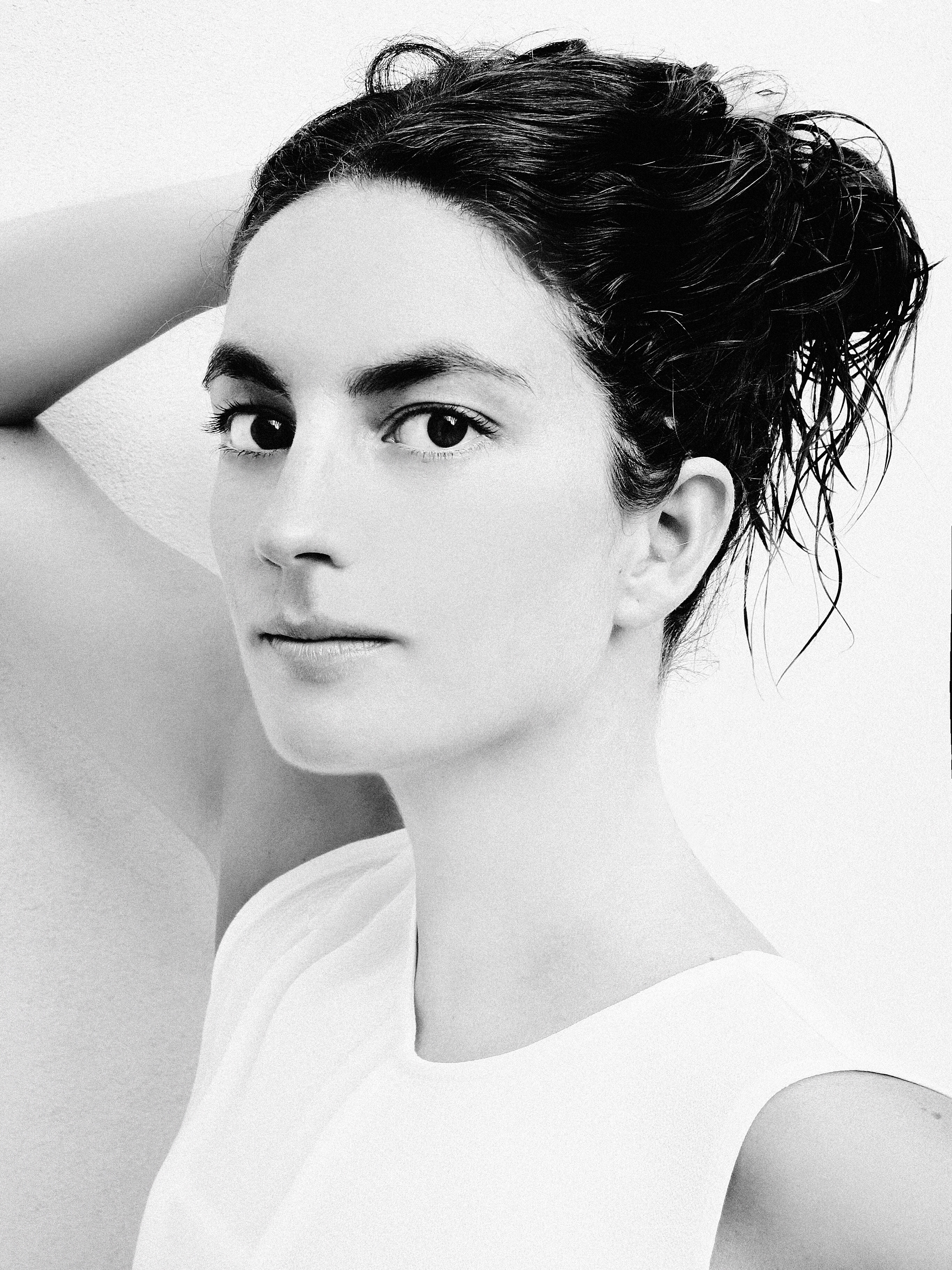
- Portrait by Giovanni Gastel
- Born: 19 August 1987 (age 38); Rome, Italy
- Education: Central St. Martins, Gemological Institute of America (GIA)
- Occupation: Jewellery designer
- Known for: Ancient Coin Jewellery

Benedetta Dubini (born 19 August 1987) is a London-based, Italian-born jewellery designer.

== Early life and education ==
Benedetta Dubini was born in Rome to a Milanese father and a Roman mother and she spent her childhood between London and Milan.

Her grandfather, Giovanni Amati, was a film producer and cinema owner in the 1950s and 1960s during the golden era of Italian cinema and his wife, Anna Maria Pancani, was a prominent actress of the time, close friend of Sophia Loren and Valentino who designed pieces for her.

Dubini graduated in 2009 from Central Saint Martins with a degree in Jewellery Design. She then went on to the Gemological Institute of America (GIA), where she earned a graduate gemologist diploma in 2010.

== Career ==
Dubini’s influences are multicultural. Before starting her own brand, she worked in Jaipur, learning the traditional Indian crafts from the iconic jewellery house - Gem Palace. She also spent time imbibing the Italian artistry of jewel making whilst working with Villa, Carolina Bucci and Pomellato.

In 2013, Dubini returned to London and began traveling between her design studio and Rome where she started working alongside local goldsmiths in order to combine their traditional craftsmanship with her modern aesthetic.

Dubini’s debut collection 'Empires' was launched in 2014 and is a tribute to her Roman heritage and represents the brands signature aesthetic which marries coins from ancient civilizations with a contemporary frame.

After the success of the Empires collection, Dubini introduced ‘Theodora’ in 2016, a collection inspired by the Byzantine Empress Theodora which saw her reinterpret the mosaics from the Hagia Sophia in Istanbul commissioned during her rule next to Emperor Justinian I.

She designs from her studio in London and her collections are made in Italy. Her work has been worn by Eva Herzigová, Liya Kebede, Bella Hadid and Malgosia Bela.
