= Napoletans =

- Directed by: Luigi Russo
- Written by: Luciano Martino
- Starring: Massimo Ceccherini; Maurizio Casagrande; Andrea Roncato; Nando Paone; Paola Lavini
- Edited by: Luca Biglione; Luciano Martino
- Release date: 2 December 2011
- Running time: 90 minutes
- Country: Italy
- Language: Italian

Napoletans is a 2011 Italian film directed by Luigi Russo.

== Plot ==
In a small town in southern Italy there is the family Di Gennaro. Gennaro, the householder, is a noted dentist, married to Anna, a housewife, a few years converted to Buddhism. They have two sons: Roberto, last year medical student and guitarist in a small band, and Mattia who attended the first year of high school. Apparently the Di Gennaro just seem a perfect family, but each character hides flaws and excesses.
