= The Repenter =

- Directed by: Pasquale Squitieri
- Starring: Franco Nero
- Cinematography: Silvano Ippoliti
- Edited by: Mauro Bonanni
- Music by: Ennio Morricone
- Production company: C. G. Silver Film
- Distributed by: Columbia Pictures
- Release date: 1985
- Country: Italy
- Languages: Italian; English

Il pentito (internationally released as The Repenter and The Squealer) is a 1985 Italian crime-drama film directed by Pasquale Squitieri. The film is loosely based on actual events involving, among others, pentito Tommaso Buscetta, judge Giovanni Falcone and banker Michele Sindona.

== Cast ==
- Tony Musante: Vanni Ragusa
- Franco Nero: Judge Falco
- Max von Sydow: Spinola
- Erik Estrada: Salvo Lercara
- Rita Rusic: lover of Vanni Ragusa
- Ivo Garrani: Boss
- Marino Masè: Carabinieri Lieutenant
- Tony Sperandeo: killer
- Imma Piro
- Claudine Auger
- Marina Berti
- Philippe Lemaire
- Rik Battaglia
