= Il pranzo della domenica =

- Directed by: Carlo Vanzina
- Written by: Enrico Vanzina; Carlo Vanzina
- Starring: Massimo Ghini; Barbara De Rossi; Rocco Papaleo; Maurizio Mattioli; Elena Sofia Ricci; Galatea Ranzi
- Cinematography: Claudio Zamarion
- Music by: Alberto Caruso
- Release date: 2003
- Running time: 100 minutes
- Country: Italy
- Language: Italian

Il pranzo della domenica (Sunday Lunch) is a 2003 Italian comedy film directed by Carlo Vanzina. For her performance Giovanna Ralli was nominated for Nastro d'Argento for Best Supporting Actress, while Rocco Papaleo and Maurizio Mattioli were both nominated for Nastro d'Argento for Best Supporting Actor.

== Plot ==
Franca Malorni has three daughters with whom she has an obsessive relationship. In fact, she can not break away from them and pretend that every Sunday the girls are from her to eat lunch with their families. When Franca breaks femur and goes to the hospital, the three daughters begin to think about the will...

== Cast ==
- Massimo Ghini: Massimo Papi
- Elena Sofia Ricci: Sofia Lo Iacono
- Barbara De Rossi: Barbara
- Galatea Ranzi: Susanna Papi
- Rocco Papaleo: Nicola Lo Iacono
- Maurizio Mattioli: Maurizio
- Giovanna Ralli: Franca Malorni
- Paolo Triestino: Luzi
- Marco Messeri: Marquis
- Gianfranco Barra: On. Torrisi
- Angelo Bernabucci: Consigliere Calcio
