= Tiziana Lodato =

Italian actress (born 1976)

- Born: 10 November 1976 (age 49); Catania, Italy
- Occupation: Actress

Tiziana Lodato (born 10 November 1976) is an Italian film, stage and television actress.

== Life and career ==
Born in Catania, Italy, Lodato attended the Istituto d'Arte in her hometown, and at young age she debuted on stage at the Teatro Stabile di Catania.

She made her film debut in 1995, with the main female role in Giuseppe Tornatore's The Star Maker. After finishing her studies, she moved to Rome where she continued her acting career in films, television and on stage. She is married to a pharmaceutical executive since 2005 and has a son.
