= Nando Paone =

Italian actor

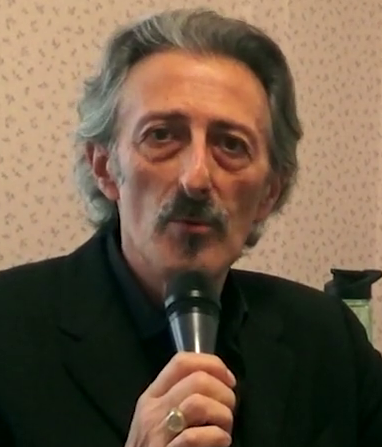
- Paone in 2019
- Born: 27 November 1956 (age 69); Naples, Italy
- Occupation: Actor
- Years active: 1977-present
- Height: 1.85 m (6 ft 1 in)

Nando Paone (born 27 November 1956) is an Italian actor. He appeared in more than thirty films since 1977.

== Selected filmography ==
Year	Title	Role	Notes
2020	The Predators		
2012	Benvenuti al Nord		
2012	Reality		
2011	Napoletans		
2010	Benvenuti al Sud		
2000	Freewheeling		
1999	Amore a prima vista		
1998	My Best Friend's Wife		
1982	Bomber		
1982	Vai avanti tu che mi vien da ridere		
1981	La gatta da pelare		
1981	Camera d'albergo		
1980	The Day Christ Died		
1980	Mia moglie è una strega		
1979	How to Seduce Your Teacher		
1978	They Called Him Bulldozer		
1977	La compagna di banco		
