= Luca Argentero =

Italian actor (born 1978)

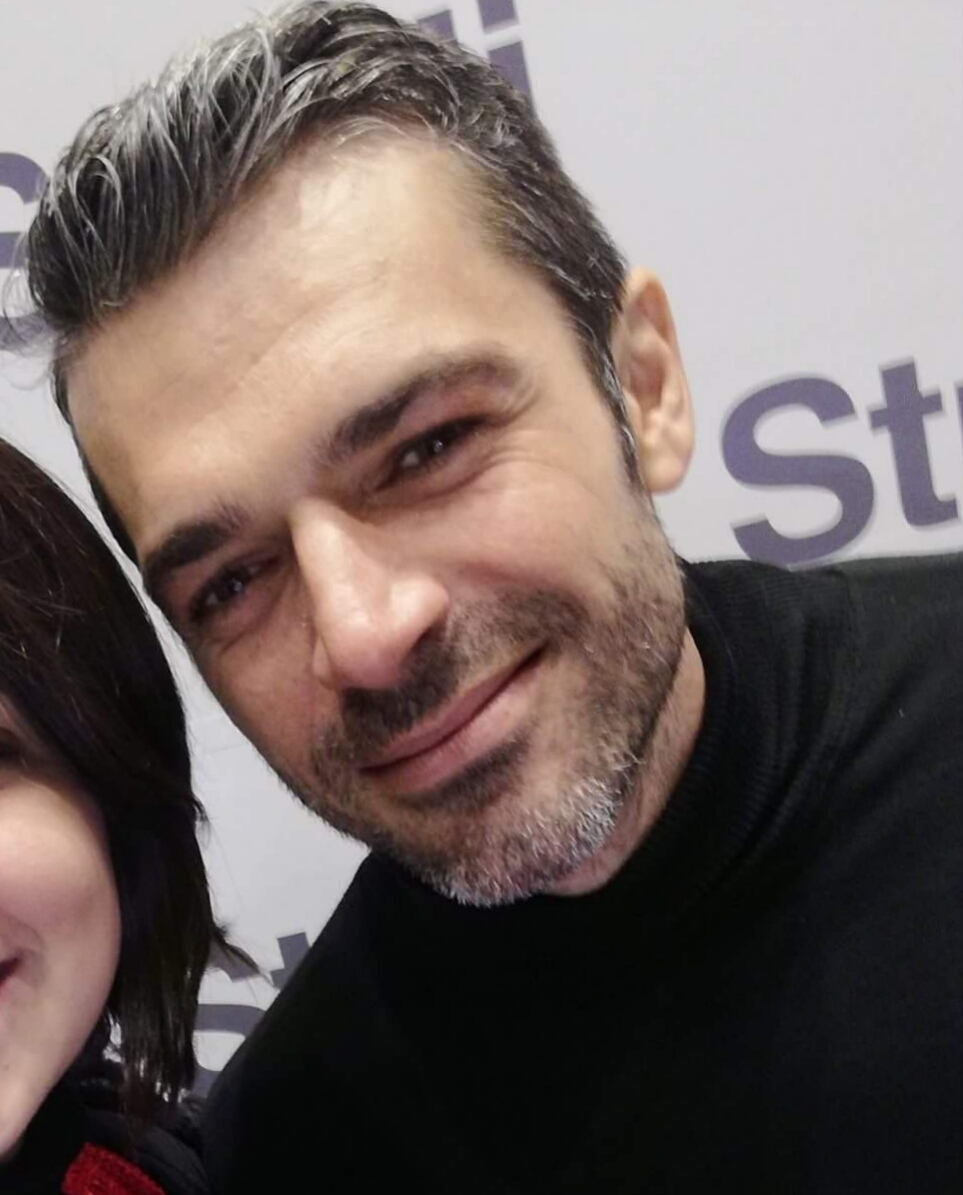
- Argentero in 2017
- Born: April 12, 1978 (age 48); Turin, Italy
- Occupation: Actor
- Years active: 1985–present
- Spouse: Myriam Catania (m. 2009; div. 2016)

Luca Argentero (born 12 April 1978) is an Italian actor, model, and television personality. He has appeared in more than 18 films since 2006.

== Biography ==
Born in Turin to Guido and Agata, Argentero grew up in neighboring Moncalieri. After completing high school at the Catholic "Collegio San Giuseppe", he worked as a bartender in a local nightclub while earning a degree in Economy & Commerce in 2004. Argentero rose to fame in 2003 as a participant in the third season of the popular reality TV series Grande Fratello (Big Brother), arriving to the final and earning third place, with 9% of the Italian votes. After this experience, Argentero began guest appearing on a variety of television shows and worked as a model, posing for a sensual calendar made by the Italian monthly magazine Max.

In 2005, Argentero made his debut as an actor in the television series Carabinieri, in which he portrayed the character of Marco Tosi in the fourth, fifth, and sixth seasons. In 2006, he played the main character in the short film Il Quarto Sesso (The Fourth Sex). That same year, Argentero also made his cinematic debut in A Casa Nostra (Our Country), directed by Francesca Comencini. In 2007, he was in Saturno Contro (Saturn in Opposition), a film by Ferzan Özpetek, playing the role of a homosexual man. The same year, Argentero also appeared in Lezioni di Cioccolato, a film by Claudio Cupellini. In addition, he appeared on television as one of the two main characters in the miniseries La Baronessa di Carini.

In 2008, Argentero took the role of the protagonist in the film Solo un padre, directed by Luca Lucini. Production on this movie began in January 2008 in Argentero's hometown of Turin. In 2009 he was in Diverso da Chi? (Different from Whom?), in which he again portrayed a gay man. This role earned Argentero his first David di Donatello nomination as best actor.

== Filmography ==
=== Film ===
Year	Title	Role(s)	Notes
2006	Our Country	Gerry	
2007	Saturn in Opposition	Lorenzo Marchetti	
2007	Lessons in Chocolate	Mattia Cavedoni	
2008	Solo un padre	Carlo	
2009	Different from Whom?	Piero	
2009	The Big Dream	Libero	
2009	Oggi sposi	Nicola Impanato	
2010	The Woman of My Dreams	Leonardo	
2010	Eat Pray Love	Giovanni	
2011	Some Say No	Max Rizzi	
2011	Hop	Fred DeLepris	Voice
2011	Lezioni di cioccolato 2	Mattia Cavedoni	
2012	The Lookout	Nico	
2012	Gladiators of Rome	Timo	Voice
2012	They Call It Summer	Alessandro	
2012	Evil Things - Cose cattive	—	Producer
2013	Women Drive Me Crazy	Corrado	
2013	White as Milk, Red as Blood	The Professor	
2013	Cha Cha Cha	Corso	
2014	A Boss in the Living Room	Michele Coso	
2014	Unique Brothers	Francesco	
2014	Tre tocchi	Dream Man #1	Cameo
2015	The Legendary Giulia and Other Miracles	Diego	
2015	Poli opposti	Stefano	
2015	Vacanze ai Caraibi	Fausto	
2016	Al posto tuo	Luca Molteni	
2016	The Last Shaman	—	Producer
2017	Il permesso - 48 ore fuori	Donato	
2018	Hotel Gagarin	Sergio	
2018	Cosa fai a Capodanno?	Mirko	
2019	Copperman	Anselmo/ Copperman	
2019	Io, Leonardo	Leonardo da Vinci	
2019	Brave ragazze	Giovanni Morandi	
2021	Luca	Lorenzo Paguro	Voice
2021	Like a Cat on a Highway 2	Don Davide	
2023	The Best Days	Gianni	
2025	Una famiglia sottosopra	Alessandro Moretti	
TBA	Nella gioia e nel dolore †	TBA	Filming

=== Television ===
Year	Title	Role(s)	Notes
2003	Grande Fratello	Himself	Contestant (season 3)
2005–2007	Carabinieri	Marco Tosi	Main role (seasons 4–6); 74 episodes
2007	La baronessa di Carini	Luca	Television film
2011	Tiberio Mitri - Il barone e la miss	Tiberio Mitri	Television film
2013–2014	Amici di Maria De Filippi	Himself	Judge
2015	Ragion di Stato	Andrea Rosso	2 episodes
2017	Sirene	Salvatore Gargiulo	Main role; 6 episodes
2020–present	Doc – Nelle tue mani	Dr. Andrea Fanti	Lead role
2022	The Ignorant Angels	Massimo	Lead role; 8 episodes
2024	La coda del diavolo	Sante Moras	Television film
2025	Call My Agent - Italia	Himself	Episode: "Luca"
2026	Avvocato Ligas	Lorenzo Ligas	Lead role; 6 episodes
2026	Motorvalley	Arturo	Main role; 6 episodes

== Awards and nominations ==
Year	Award	Category	Work	Result	Ref.
2023	Ciak d'Oro Serie TV	Best Italian Actor	The Ignorant Angels; Doc – Nelle tue mani	Nominated	
