= Gaetano Aronica =

Italian actor (born 1963)

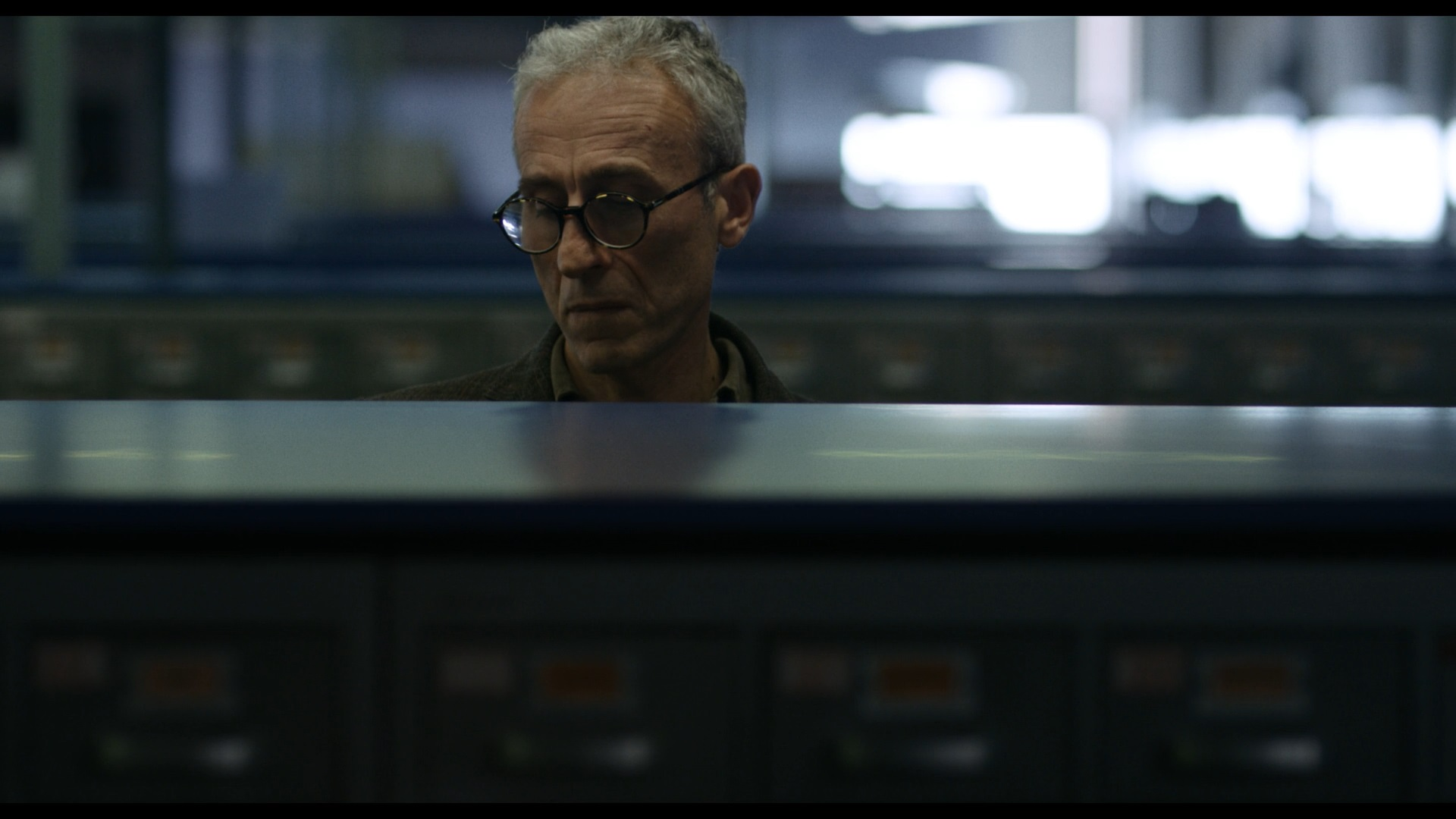
- Born: September 30, 1963 (age 62); Agrigento, Sicily, Italy
- Occupation: Actor
- Years active: 1990s–present
- Title: President of the Pirandello Theater Foundation

Gaetano Aronica (born 30 September 1963) is an Italian actor, known for playing the Roman general Varus in the 2020 Netflix television series Barbarians.

He also stars in the films Malèna (2000), Il Capo dei Capi (2007) and Baarìa (2009).

He is from Agrigento, Sicily.

== See also ==
- List of Italian actors
- List of people from Sicily
