= Elisabetta Rocchetti =

Italian actress and film director

- Born: 25 January 1975 (age 51); Rome
- Occupations: Actress; director

Elisabetta Rocchetti (born 25 January 1975, in Rome) is an Italian actress and film director.

== Biography ==
Elisabetta Rocchetti, daughter of lawyer Nicola Rocchetti, made her film acting debut in 1996, in Traveling Companion, directed by Peter Del Monte.

In 2003 she won the Golden Globe Award for Best Debut Actress for the film The Embalmer (2002), directed by Matteo Garrone, in which she starred with Valerio Foglia Manzillo.

Among her other film performances are The Card Player and Sleepless, both directed by Dario Argento, Love Is Eternal While It Lasts, directed by Carlo Verdone, and I Love You in All the Languages in the World, directed by Leonardo Pieraccioni. For television she featured in Il bello delle donne, Do You Like Hitchcock?, Caterina e le sue figlie 2 and Terapia d'urgenza.

In 2006, Rocchetti made her directing debut with the short film L'ultima seduta with Alessandro Manetti, Valentina Tosti and Giampaolo Morelli. In 2010, she wrote, directed and produced her first feature film titled Eighteen: The World at My Feet which starred Marco Rulli, Marco Iannitello and Nina Torresi. In September 2015 she returned to direction with The Veil of Maya, which was filmed in Rome and Grosseto.

== Filmography ==
=== Acting ===
==== Films ====
Year	Title
1996	Traveling Companion
1997	I colori del diavolo
1997	Wax Mask
1997	L'amico di Wang
1997	La classe non è acqua
1999	Besame mucho
2000	A Chinese in a Coma
2000	Tobia al caffè
2001	Sleepless
2001	The Last Kiss
2002	Un amore perfetto
2002	The Embalmer
2003	Cattive inclinazioni
2004	The Card Player
2004	Love Is Eternal While It Lasts
2004	I tre volti del terrore
2005	Il ritorno del Monnezza
2005	Keller - Teenage Wasteland
2005	Floor 17
2005	I Love You in All the Languages in the World
2006	The Last House in the Woods
2007	Il segreto di Rahil
2010	Eighteen: The World at My Feet
2012	Vento di Sicilia
2017	The Veil of Maya

==== Television ====
Year	Title	Notes
2001	Il bello delle donne	
2003	Ultima pallottola	Television film
2005	Do You Like Hitchcock?	Television film
2007	Crimini	"The Baby and the Babe"
2008	Terapia d'urgenza	Television film

=== Directorial works ===
Year	Title	Notes
2006	L'ultima seduta	Short film
2010	Eighteen: The World at My Feet	
2017	The Veil of Maya	
