= The Veil of Maya =

- Movie poster
- Italian: Il velo di Maya
- Directed by: Elisabetta Rocchetti
- Written by: Elisabetta Rocchetti; Chiara Cavallari
- Starring: Elisabetta Rocchetti; Valerio Foglia Manzillo
- Cinematography: Nicola Saraval
- Edited by: Elisabetta Rocchetti
- Music by: David & Lionel Maulus
- Production company: Regione Toscana
- Release date: 26 July 2017 (Ischia Film Festival)
- Running time: 81 minutes
- Country: Italy
- Language: Italian

The Veil of Maya (Italian: Il velo di Maya) is a 2017 Italian romantic comedy-drama film directed by Elisabetta Rocchetti.

The film premiered at the Ischia Film Festival on 28 June 2017. It also competed at the 2017 Terra di Siena Film Festival and won the Award for Best Director at the 2017 Fano International Film Festival.

== Cast ==
- Elisabetta Rocchetti as Anna
- Valerio Foglia Manzillo as Filippo
- Salvio Simeoli as Leo
- Sandra Milo as Mara, Anna's grandma
- Eliana Miglio as Giulia, Anna's mother
- Davide Paganini as Roberto
- Mattia Sbragia as Sergio, Anna's father
- Ines Rodriguez as Paloma
- Rosa Maria Rocchetti as Giada, Anna's sister
- Enzo Salvi as Ernesto, a psychic
- Chiara Sani as the laughter-therapy teacher
- Cosetta Turco as the psychoanalyst
- Myriam Catania as Silvia, a taxi driver
- Margareth Madè as Federica
