= Baarìa (film) =

- Theatrical release poster
- Directed by: Giuseppe Tornatore
- Written by: Giuseppe Tornatore
- Produced by: Tarak Ben Ammar
- Starring: Francesco Scianna; Margareth Madè
- Cinematography: Enrico Lucidi
- Edited by: Massimo Quaglia
- Music by: Ennio Morricone
- Production company: Medusa Film
- Distributed by: Medusa Distribuzione
- Release date: 25 September 2009 (Italy)
- Running time: 160 minutes
- Country: Italy
- Languages: Sicilian; Italian
- Budget: $30 million

Baarìa is a 2009 Italian historical drama film directed by Giuseppe Tornatore. It was the opening film of the 66th Venice International Film Festival in September 2009. Although selected as the Italian entry for the Best Foreign Language Film at the 82nd Academy Awards, it was not nominated.

== Plot ==
The film recounts life in the Sicilian town of Bagheria (known as Baarìa in Sicilian), from the 1930s to the 1980s, through the eyes of lovers Peppino (Francesco Scianna) and Mannina (Margareth Madè). A Sicilian family depicted across three generations: from Cicco to his son Peppino to his grandson Pietro. Touching lightly on the private lives of these characters and their families, the film evokes the loves, dreams and disappointments of an entire community in the province of Palermo over five decades: during the Fascist period, Cicco is a shepherd who finds time to pursue his passion: books, epic poems, the great popular romance novels. In the days when people go hungry and during World War II, his son Peppino witnesses injustice by mafiosi and landowners. He becomes a communist. After the war, he encounters the woman of his life. Her family opposes the relationship because of his political ideas, but the two insist on marrying. They have children and raise their family.

Subplots include one about a boy running an errand, a living fly locked inside a top, three rocks people try to hit in one throw, a man mutilating himself to avoid having to fight in the war, looting while the U.S. invades Sicily, making clothing from an American parachute, and Peppino's daughter calling her father a fascist for not allowing her to wear a mini-skirt.

Running through the film is the main subplot, related to the history of the Italian left, especially the Communist Party, of which Peppino is a lifelong member. It charts his fight against injustice and eventual disillusionment in the face of corruption and compromise by his fellow politicians.

== Production ==
The film was first announced during the 2007 Taormina Film Festival.

The film was shot in both Bagheria, where Tornatore was born, and in an old neighborhood of Tunis, Tunisia; the latter location used because it could better depict what Bagheria looked like in the early 20th century.

== Language ==
The film exists in two versions, the original in the local Baariotu dialect of Sicilian and the second dubbed in Italian.

== Main cast ==
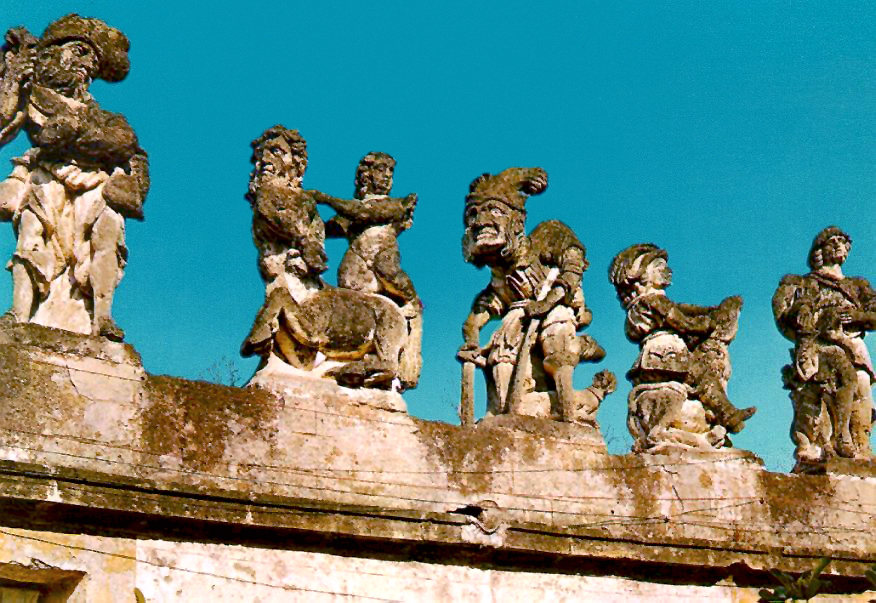
The "monsters" of Villa Palagonia also appear in the film.

- Francesco Scianna as Peppino Torrenuova
- Margareth Madè as Mannina
- Raoul Bova as Romano, a reporter
- Ángela Molina as grown-up Sarina
- Salvatore Ficarra: Nino Torrenuova
- Valentino Picone: Luigi Scalìa
- Enrico Lo Verso as Minicu
- Luigi Lo Cascio as youngster with Down syndrome
- Laura Chiatti as a student girl
- Giuseppe Fiorello as moneychanger
- Nicole Grimaudo as Sarina
- Leo Gullotta as Liborio
- Aldo Baglio as the businessman
- Gisella Marengo as Matilde
- Luigi Maria Burruano as the pharmacist
- Nino Frassica as Giacomo Bartolotta
- Giorgio Faletti as Corteccia
- Vincenzo Salemme as the chief comedian
- Tony Sperandeo as the farmer
- Monica Bellucci as the mason's girl
- Michele Placido as an exponent of the PCI
- Gabriele Lavia as the teacher
- Paolo Briguglia as the catechist
- Lina Sastri as Tana
- Gaetano Aronica as Ciccio Torrenuova
- Corrado Fortuna as Renato Guttuso

== Reception ==
=== Critical response ===
Baarìa has an approval rating of 55% on review aggregator website Rotten Tomatoes, based on 11 reviews, and an average rating of 5.4/10.

=== Nominations and awards ===
Nominated to the 2010 Golden Globe in the Best Foreign Language Film category.

It was also the Italian entry for the 2010 Academy Award for Best Foreign Language Film but did not get the nomination.

== Controversy ==
In Italy, the Lega Antivivisezione (an anti-animal cruelty group) has condemned the actual on-screen killing of a cow visible in the Italian trailer. The animal was killed with an iron punch driven in the skull without any pain-relief technique, and then seen bleeding to death while some actors collect and drink its blood.

Such a scene could not have been shot in Italy, because of laws against the unethical treatment of animals in media production. That part of the movie was filmed in Tunisia, where there are no such restrictions.

Thereafter the ENPA (National Association of Animal Protection) demanded the immediate withdrawal of all copies distributed in theatres "to avoid the exposition of minors to such disgusting and fearful images", as the film is rated for an unrestricted audience. Again according to the ENPA, although the scene was filmed in Tunisia thus bypassing the Italian law, after application to the Minister of Justice, the prosecution can still take place in Italy. In October 2009, the ENPA started an international boycott campaign against the film and an online petition asking to revoke the designation of the movie as Italian entry to the Oscars.

Responding to these critics, director Giuseppe Tornatore clarified that the location in Tunisia was not intended to bypass Italian regulations, and that the animal was not specifically killed for the film. The scene was filmed in a local slaughterhouse and the killing was one of the many that take place there every day.

== See also ==
- Italian films of 2009
- List of submissions to the 82nd Academy Awards for Best Foreign Language Film
- List of Italian submissions for the Academy Award for Best Foreign Language Film
