= Massimo Rinaldi =

Venerable Massimo Rinaldi CS
- Bishop of Rieti
- Church: Roman Catholic Church
- Diocese: Rieti
- See: Rieti
- Appointed: 2 August 1924
- Term ended: 31 May 1941
- Predecessor: Francesco Sidoli
- Successor: Benigno Luciano Migliorini

Orders
- Ordination: 6 July 1893 by Carlo Bertuzzi
- Consecration: 19 March 1925 by Rafael Merry del Val
- Rank: Bishop

Personal details
- Born: Massimo Rinaldi; 24 September 1869 Rieti, Kingdom of Italy
- Died: 31 May 1941 (aged 71) Rome, Lazio, Italy

Massimo Rinaldi (24 September 1869 – 31 May 1941) was an Italian religious priest of the Scalabrinians who served as the Bishop of Rieti.Pope Benedict XVI proclaimed Rinaldi to be venerable on 19 December 2005.

== Life ==
Massimo Rinaldi was born on 24 September 1869 in Rieti. He received the sacrament of confirmation on 20 August 1876.

Rinaldi commenced his studies for the priesthood in Rieti and was ordained in 1893. He exercised his pastoral work in Ornaro and Greccio in addition to Rieti where he was based. He served as his uncle's assistant from 1897 to 1900 in Montefiascone.

In 1900, Rinaldi became a member of the Congregation of the Missionaries of Saint Charles Borromeoin and was later sent to Brazil. He worked there until 1910 and returned home to take part in the General Chapter of Missionaries. In that, he was elected as the treasurer of the congregation and held that position until 1924.

In 1924 Pope Pius XI he was elevated as the Bishop of Rieti. He declined, but Pope Pius XI ordered him to do so. Rinaldi received the episcopal consecration on 19 March 1925 in Rome. Upon his installation, he ushered in a time of profound changes for monasteries and religious houses. He was open to social issues and attempted to cater to the social concerns of his parishioners.

Massimo Rinaldi died in 1941 in Rome. His incorrupt remains were transferred in 1966 to the Cathedral of Rieti.

== Beatification process ==
The cause of beatification started on 29 August 1990 in Rieti and the work spanned from 1991 until 1997 when all the documentation was assembled as the Positio: two volumes on his life and his heroic virtue. The local process was validated on 20 November 1998 and the Congregation for the Causes of Saints received the Positio in 2002. Pope Benedict XVI recognized Rinaldi's life of heroic virtue and proclaimed him to be venerable on 19 December 2005.

A miracle attributed to his intercession was investigated and was validated on 30 November 2001. The medical board that works on causes in Rome met twice on 26 April 2007 and 12 December 2013 and voted that the healing was indeed a miracle.
