= Maurizio Mattioli =

Italian actor and comedian

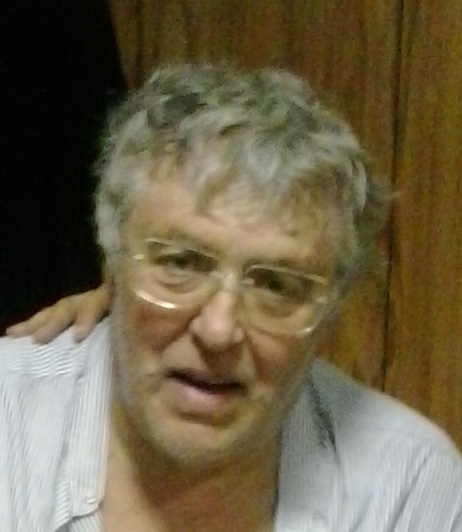
- Born: 3 June 1950 (age 75); Rome
- Occupation: actor
- Spouses: Patrizia (m. 1973, divorced) Barbara Divita (m. 1977; died 2014) Simonetta Benincasa (m. 2024)

Maurizio Mattioli (born 3 June 1950) is an Italian actor and comedian.

== Life and career ==
Born in Rome, Mattioli started his career in 1973, when he appeared in the RAI variety show Dove sta Zazà. He got his first successes as a member of the stage company "Il Bagaglino", with whom he worked in a number of stage and television projects between seventies and early nineties. Mattioli later established himself as one of the most active character actors in Italian cinema, and he was nominated twice in the best supporting actor category at the Nastro d'Argento, in 2003 for Carlo Vanzina's Sunday Lunch and in 2011 for Paolo Genovese's The Immature.

== Personal life ==
Maurizio Mattioli has been married three times and has one daughter. He considers himself a "dubious Catholic".
