= Vincenzo Salemme =

Italian actor, playwright, director and screenwriter

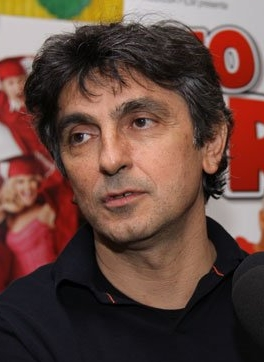
- Salemme in 2008
- Born: 24 July 1957 (age 69); Bacoli, Italy
- Occupations: Actor; comedian; writer; director; producer
- Years active: 1975–present
- Height: 1.71 m (5 ft 7 in)

Vincenzo Salemme (born 24 July 1957) is an Italian actor, comedian, and filmmaker.

== Life and career ==
Born in Bacoli, Province of Naples, Salemme began his career in 1976, with the stage company of Tato Russo.

The following year he joined the theatre crew of Eduardo De Filippo, later led by his son Luca, where he worked until 1992. In a 2018 interview, he said that De Filippo taught him to "italianise" words in Neapolitan when not in Naples, so everybody could understand the play.

In the 1990s, Salemme started writing and producing his own comedy plays, enjoying a large success with E fuori nevica.

He debuted in the movie industry the early 1980s as a character actor; following his increasing popularity on stage, in 1998 he wrote, directed and starred in the comedy film L'amico del cuore, which enjoyed a considerable commercial success.

In the following years, Salemme alternated his personal projects, on stage and on the big screen, and leading roles in films by other directors, usually comedies.

Salemme was also the protagonist of two television shows, Famiglia Salemme Show (2006) and Da Nord a Sud... e ho detto tutto! (2009), both of them aired on RAI.

== Filmography ==
=== Film ===
Title	Year	Role(s)	Notes
Sweet Dreams	1981	Cultural operator	Uncredited
Sweet Body of Bianca	1984	Massimiliano	
The Mass Is Ended	1985	Andrea	
C'è posto per tutti	1990	Tommaso	
Death of a Neapolitan Mathematician	1992	Communist militant	Cameo
Il tuffo	1993	Matteo	
My Best Friend's Wife	1998	Roberto Cordova	Also director and writer
Amore a prima vista	1999	Bruno Garramone	Also director and writer
Picasso's Face	2000	Himself	Cameo
Freewheeling	2000	Pericle Caruso	Also director and writer
Volesse il cielo!	2002	The Stranger	Also director and writer
Opopomoz	2003	Joseph (voice)	Voice role
Ho visto le stelle!	2003	Antonio Savarese	Also director and writer
Cose da pazzi	2005	Felice	Also director and writer
Olé	2006	Salvatore Rondinella	
Baciami piccina	2006	Raoul Nuvolini	
SMS	2007	Tommaso Lampedusa	Also director and writer
No Problem	2008	Arturo Cremisi	Also director and writer
Many Kisses Later	2009	Filippo	
Baarìa	2009	Chief Comedian	
La vita è una cosa meravigliosa	2010	Antonio	
Make a Fake	2011	Enzo Gesumunno	
Baciato dalla fortuna	2011	Gaetano	
Ex 2: Still Friends?	2011	Antonio Schiavone	
Lessons in Chocolate 2	2011	Gastone Conti	
10 Rules for Falling in Love	2012	Renato	
Buona giornata	2012	Luigi Pirandi	
Us in the U.S.	2013	Antonio	
Sapore di te	2014	Piero De Marco	
... E fuori nevica!	2014	Enzo Righi	Also director and writer
What's Your Sign?	2014	Augusto Fioretti	
Se mi lasci non vale	2016	Vincenzo	Also director and writer
Non si ruba a casa dei ladri	2016	Antonio Russo	
Storks	2016	Toady (voice)	Italian dub
Prima di lunedì	2016	Vincenzo Briganti	
Caccia al tesoro	2017	Domenico Greco	
Tainted Souls	2017	Walter	
Una festa esagerata	2018	Gennaro	Also director and writer
Se son rose	2018	Mr. Formisano	
Vengo anch'io	2018	Michele	
Compromessi sposi	2019	Gaetano De Rosa	
7 ore per farti innamorare	2020	Enrico Dell'Orefice	
È per il tuo bene	2020	Antonio	
Con tutto il cuore	2021	Ottavio Camaldoli	Also director and writer
I fratelli De Filippo	2021	Riccardo Ruggiti	
Il sesso degli angeli	2022	Antonello Rovincello	
Le guerra dei nonni	2023	Gerry	

=== Television ===
Title	Year	Role(s)	Notes
Il cilindro	1978	Antonio	Television movie
Un'isola	1986	Officer Vaporetto	Two-parts television movie
Un siciliano in Sicilia	1987	Mr. Quartullo	Two-parts television movie
Distretto di Polizia	2005	Himself	Episode: "Il giustiziere"
Ballando con le Stelle	2006	Contestant	Season 3
Miss Italia	2016	Judge	Annual beauty contest
Tale e quale show	2018–2020	Judge	Talent show
