= Vittorio Cecchi Gori =

Italian film producer and politician

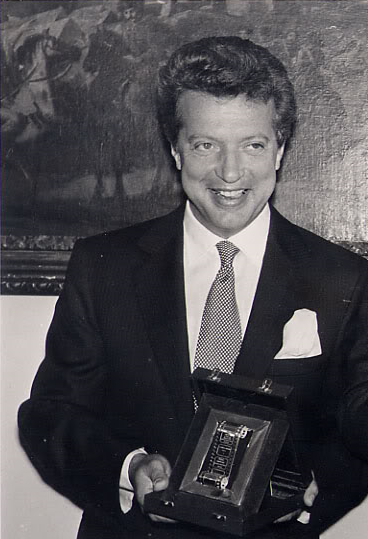
- Vittorio Cecchi Gori in 1989

Member of the Senate
- In office 15 April 1994 – 29 May 2001
- Constituency: Tuscany

Personal details
- Born: 27 April 1942 (age 84) Florence, Kingdom of Italy
- Party: Italian People's Party
- Spouse: Rita Rusić (m. 1983; div. 2000)
- Children: 2
- Occupation: Film producer; politician

Vittorio Cecchi Gori (Italian pronunciation: [vitˈtɔːrjo ˈtʃekki ˈɡɔːri]; born 27 April 1942) is an Italian film producer and politician. He pleaded guilty to bankruptcy and was sentenced in February 2020 to eight years and five months of imprisonment.

Born in Florence, Italy, he is the son of Mario Cecchi Gori. He has produced numerous films, most notably Il Postino: The Postman (1994), which received an Academy Award nomination for Best Picture, and Life Is Beautiful (1997), which received an Academy Award for Best Foreign Language Film.

He was also a senator from the Italian People's Party.

He owned the football club Fiorentina from 1993 to 2002, as well as the private television channel La7. On 3 June 2008, he was arrested in Rome for bankruptcy, and again on 25 July 2011.

Italian Senate
| Preceded by Title jointly held | Senator; Legislatures; XII, XIII; 1994–2001 | Succeeded by Title jointly held |
