= Maurizio Casagrande =

Italian actor and film/stage director

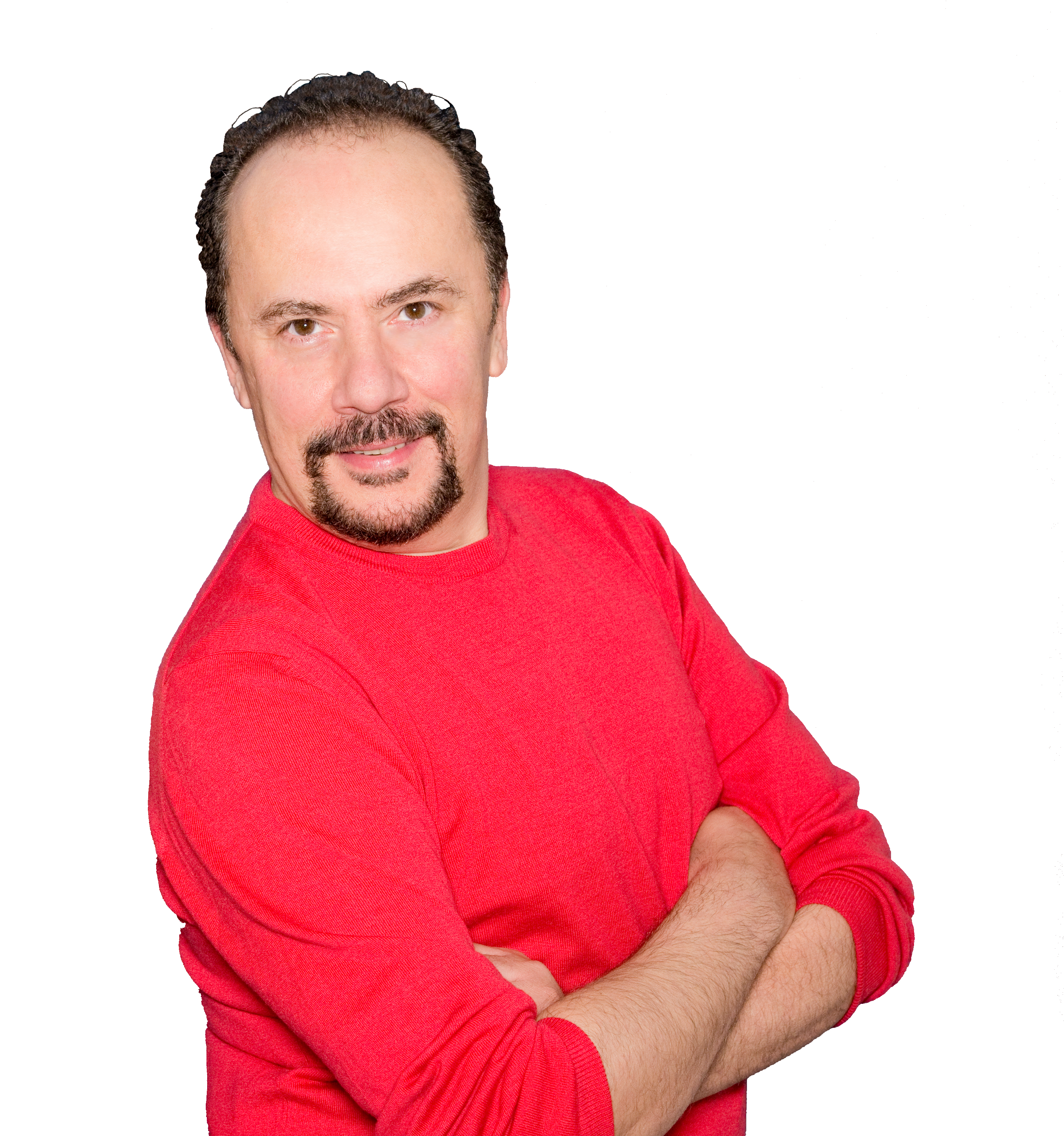
- Born: 4 November 1961 (age 63); Naples, Italy
- Occupation: Actor
- Height: 1.70 m (5 ft 7 in)

Maurizio Casagrande (born 4 November 1961) is an Italian actor, comedian, cabaret performer, writer, screenwriter, TV conductor and film and stage director.

== Life and career ==
Born in Naples, the son of the actor and director Antonio, Casagrande studied as a baritone at the Conservatorio di San Pietro a Majella and studied piano, jazz drums and guitar at the Liceo Musicale Bellini in his hometown. Graduated in acting from the Bottega Teatrale del Mezzogiorno, he is mainly active on stage, working intensively with Vincenzo Salemme since 1992. He made his film debut in the late 1990s in a number of Salemme's comedy films, which gave him an almost immediate popularity. After directing a number of stage works, he made his feature film directorial debut in 2012, with the comedy Una donna per la vita.
