= Laura Torrisi =

Italian actress

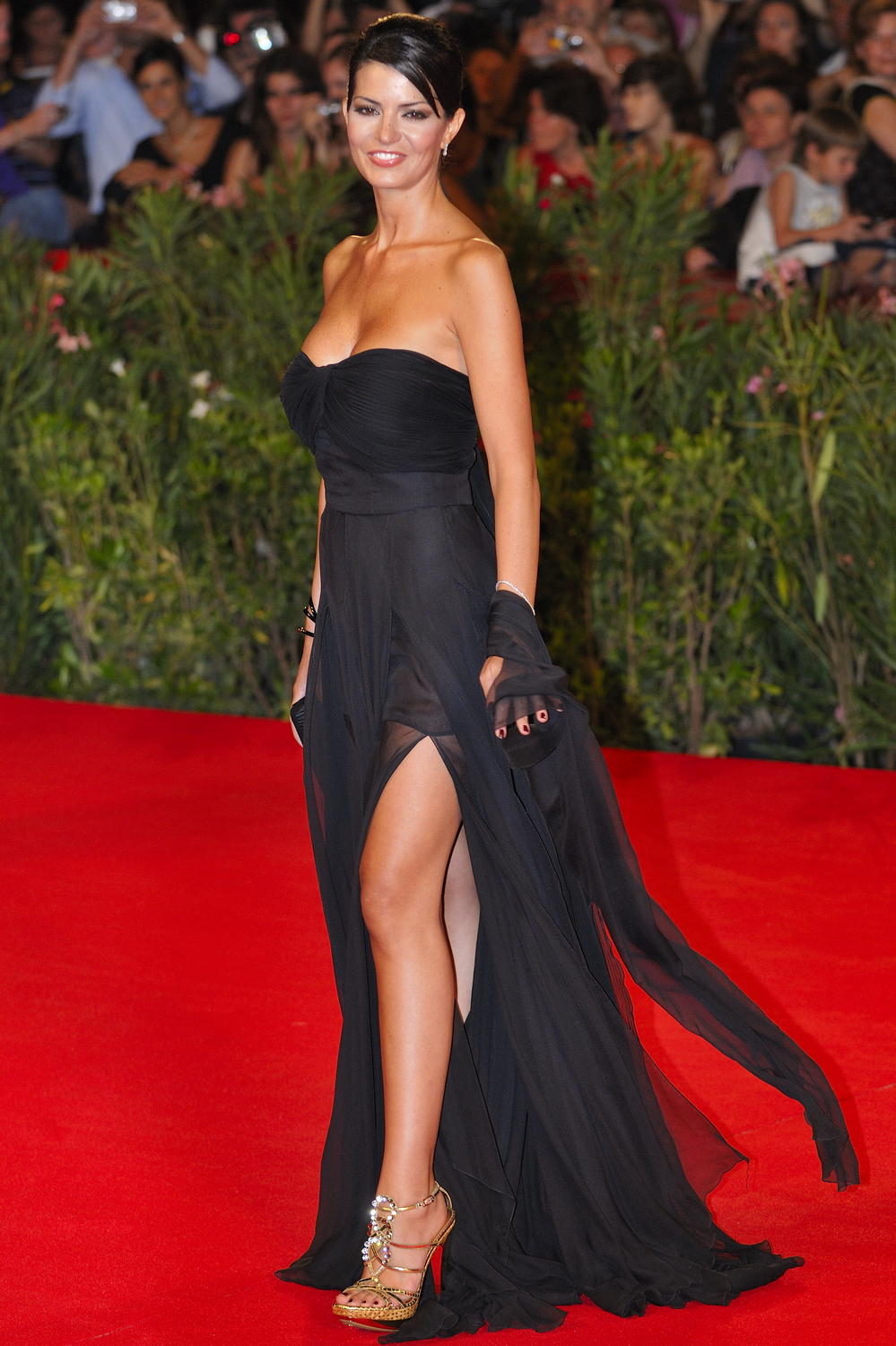
- Laura Torrisi at the Venice International Film Festival in 2009
- Born: 7 December 1979 (age 46); Catania, Sicily, Italy
- Occupation: Actress

Laura Torrisi (born 7 December 1979) is an Italian actress. Born in Sicily, she has participated in the Italian version of the reality show Big Brother and was a finalist in the Miss Italia 1998 beauty pageant. She had her first acting role in the 1998 film Mr. Fifteen Balls.

== Filmography ==
=== Film ===
- Mr. Fifteen Balls, by Francesco Nuti (1998)
- Lucignolo, by Massimo Ceccherini (1999)
- A Beautiful Wife, by Leonardo Pieraccioni (2007)
- Sharm el Sheikh - Un'estate indimenticabile, (2010)

=== Television ===
- Il peccato e la vergogna, by Luigi Parisi - TV series (2010–2014)
- L'onore e il rispetto, by Salvatore Samperi - TV series (2009–2015)
- Le tre rose di Eva 4, by Raffaele Mertes - TV series (2017)
- Sacrificio d'amore - TV series (2017)
- Furore - Il vento della speranza 2, (2018)
