= Rocco Papaleo =

Italian actor, film director, and singer (born 1958)

Rocco Antonio Papaleo
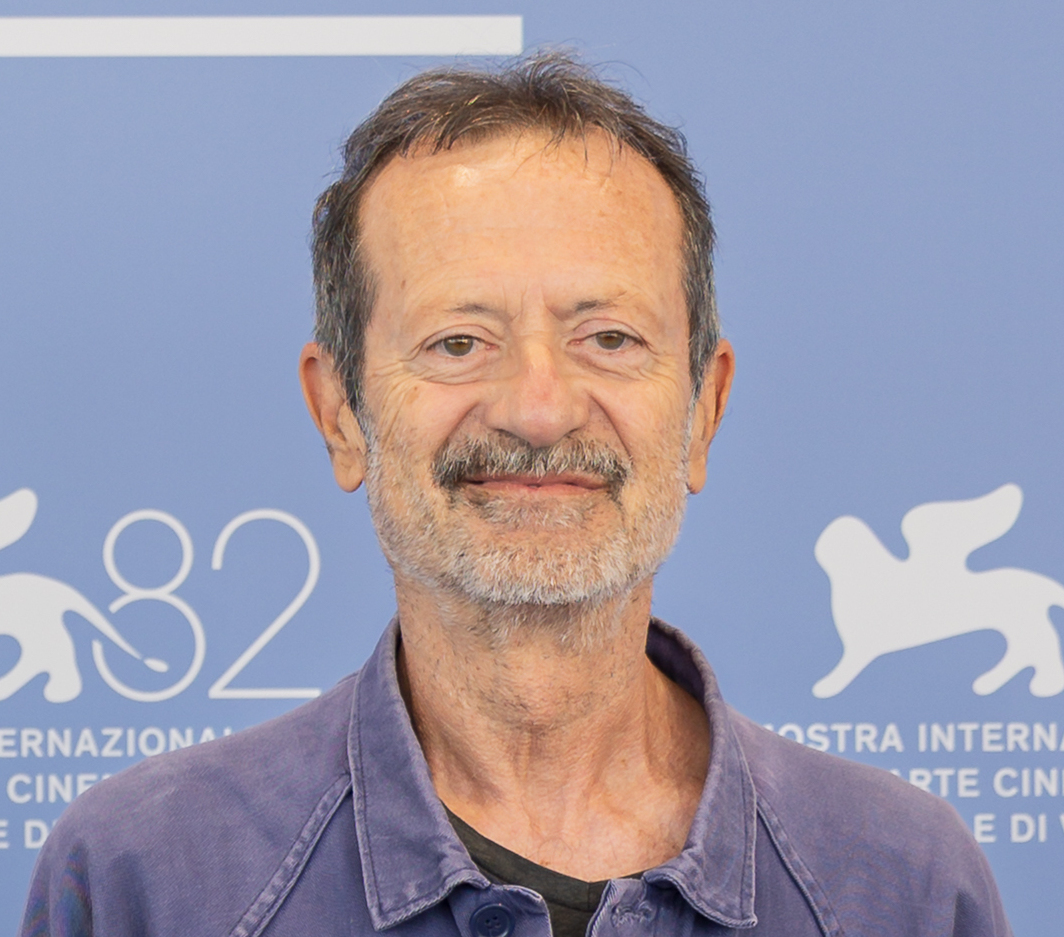
- Rocco Papaleo in 2025
- Born: 16 August 1958 (age 68); Lauria, Italy
- Occupations: Actor; film director; singer
- Height: 1.72 m (5 ft 8 in)

Rocco Antonio Papaleo (born 16 August 1958) is an Italian actor, film director, comedian and singer.

== Biography ==
Born in Lauria, Basilicata, Papaleo moved to Rome to study mathematics at university while working as a dishwasher. He left university to attend the theatre school. He made his theatrical debut in 1984 with Lauria Swing Story, which he wrote and directed. After a few television appearances as a comedian, he landed his first major role in the TV series Classe di ferro, followed by his film debut with a small part in Dark Illness. Later he started a long collaboration with actors and directors Leonardo Pieraccioni and Giovanni Veronesi. He also starred in films such as Of Lost Love (1998), What a Beautiful Day (2010), Escort in Love (2011), and Pinocchio (2019). He made his debut as a film director with Basilicata Coast to Coast (2010), winning a Nastro d'Argento and a David di Donatello award for Best New Director. He presented the Sanremo Music Festival 2012, along with Gianni Morandi and Ivana Mrazova.

== Filmography ==
=== Film ===
Title	Year	Role(s)	Notes
Dark Illness	1990	Neighbor	Cameo appearance
With Closed Eyes	1994	Co-worker	Cameo appearance
The Graduates	1995	Rocco	
August Vacation	1996	Brigadier	
The Barber of Rio	1996	Ugo	
Growing Artichokes in Mimongo	1996	Examiner	Cameo appearance
Finalmente soli	1997	Alberto	
Five Stormy Days	1997	Michele	
Viola Kisses Everybody	1998	Nicola	Also co-writer
Of Lost Love	1998	Cucchiaro	
La bomba	1999	Gaetano	
Voglio stare sotto al letto	1999	Vincenzo	
Il trasformista	2002	Orlando Lanzetta	
Suddenly Paradise	2003	Giandomenico Bardella	
Il pranzo della domenica	2003	Nicola Lo Iacono	
What Will Happen to Us	2004	Doorman	
I Love You in Every Language in the World	2005	Mr. Anselmi	
Commediasexi	2006	Tony Muciaccia	
Don't Make Any Plans for Tonight	2006	Nicola	
A Beautiful Wife	2007	Pomodoro	
Non c'è più niente da fare	2008	Massimo Lupi	
Me and Marilyn	2009	Arnolfo Biagioli	
Amalfi: Rewards of the Goddess	2009	Inspector Bartolini	
Due vite per caso	2010	Bertano	
Basilicata Coast to Coast	2010	Nicola Palmieri	Also director, writer and composer
What a Beautiful Day	2011	Nicola Zalone	
Escort in Love	2011	Lionello Frustace	
Finalmente la felicità	2011	Sandrino Terraciano	
È nata una star?	2012	Fausto Cuviello	
Pinocchio	2012	Mangiafuoco (voice)	Voice role
Viva l'Italia	2012	Tony	
A Small Southern Enterprise	2013	Father Costantino	Also director
La voce - Il talento può uccidere	2013	Gianni	
A Boss in the Living Room	2014	Ciro Cimmaruta	
La buca	2014	Armando La Bella	
La scuola più bella del mondo	2014	Mr. Gerardo Gergale	
Happily Mixed Up	2014	Michelangelo	
An Italian Name	2015	Claudio	
Animal Kingdom: Let's Go Ape	2015	Sergey (voice)	Voice role
Onda su onda	2016	Gegè Cristofori	Also director and writer
What's the Big Deal	2016	Franco	
Ears	2016	Giancarlo	
The Place	2017	Odoacre	
The Prize	2017	Rinaldo	
Bob & Marys - Criminali a domicilio	2018	Roberto	
Tu mi nascondi qualcosa	2018	Alberto	
The King's Musketeers	2018	Athos, Count de la Fère	
Il grande spirito	2019	Renato	
Pinocchio	2019	The Cat	
All for One, One for All!	2020	Athos, Count de la Fère	
Si vive una volta sola	2021	Amedeo Lasalandra	
Scordato	2023	Orlando Bevilacqua	Also director and writer
The Worst Days	2023	Vittorio	
Another Summer Holiday	2024	Pampiglione	
Madly	2025	Valium	
U.S. Palmese	2025	Don Vincenzo	
Tired of Killing: Autobiography of an Assassin	2025	Peppino Pesce	
Il bene comune	2026	Biagio	Also director and writer

=== Television ===
Title	Year	Role(s)	Notes
Classe di ferro	1989–1991	Corporal Rocco Melloni	24 episodes
Quelli della speciale	1993	Oreste Cascio	11 episodes
Giornalisti	2000	Andrea Castelli	13 episodes
Padre Pio: Between Heaven and Earth	2000	Friar Nicola	Television movie
Cuore di donna	2002	Goffredo	Television movie
Vola sciusciù	2003	Omero	Television movie
Cuore contro cuore	2004–2005	Rocco Amato	22 episodes
I Cesaroni	2006	None	Writer; episode: "Promessi sposi"
Le Cri	2006	Razza	4 episodes
Sanremo Music Festival 2012	2012	Himself / Co-host	Annual music festival
Zelig	2014	Himself / Guest host	Variety show, episode: "Sept. 9, 2014"
L'anno che verrà	2015	Himself / Host	Annual New Year's Eve special
Maledetti amici miei	2019	Himself / Host	Satirical talk show
Vita da Carlo	2021	Virgilio	Episode: "Date with surprise"
No Activity - Niente da segnalare	2024	Tony Totaro	6 episodes

=== Music videos ===
Title	Year	Artist(s)	Notes
"Ancora qui"	2009	Renato Zero	
"Mentre dormi"	2010	Max Gazzè	Only director
"Lontano da tutto"	2011	Serena Abrami	Only director
"Dove cadono i fulmini"	2013	Erica Mou	Also director

== Television ==
- Classe di ferro (1989–1991)
- Quelli della speciale (1992)
- Padre Pio: Between Heaven and Earth (2000)
- Vola Sciusciù (2000)
- Giornalisti (2000)
- Cuore contro cuore (2004)
- Le Cri (2006)
- Sanremo Music Festival (2012)

== Discography ==
- Che non si sappia in giro (BMG Ricordi, 1997)
- La mia parte imperfetta (Sony Music, 2012)
