= Andrea Balestri =

Italian film actor

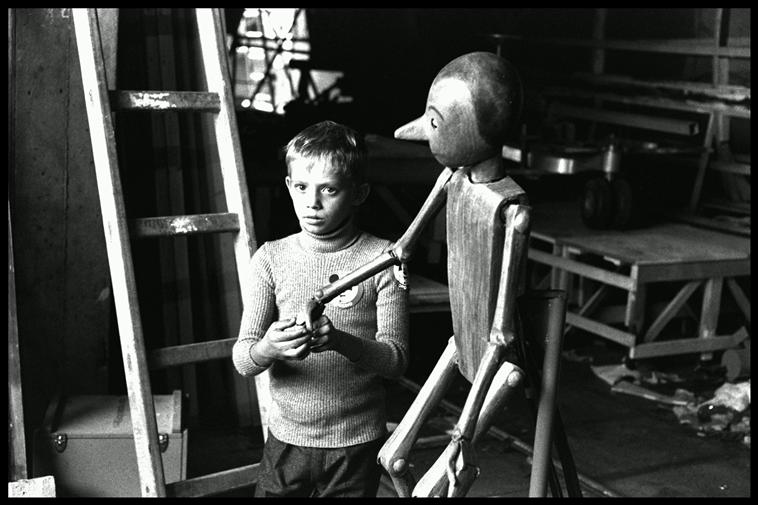
- Balestri in The Adventures of Pinocchio
- Born: Andrea Balestri; 1 September 1963 (age 62); Pisa, Italy
- Occupations: Actor; singer
- Years active: 1972–1976; 2000–present

Andrea Balestri (born 1 September 1963) is an Italian actor and singer.

== Career ==
He is known as the Pinocchio in 1972 serial TV The Adventures of Pinocchio, directed by Luigi Comencini, next to actors like Nino Manfredi, Franco and Ciccio, Gina Lollobrigida and the great actor and director Vittorio De Sica as the Judge.

After the great success on TV, Balestri continued he acting career working on other movies as Torino nera, directed by Carlo Lizzani, with Bud Spencer and Domenico Santoro the Lucignoloin Pinocchio, the children movie Kid il monello del West, that won the Giffoni Film Festival as the best adaptation in 1976, and Furia nera, directed by Demofilo Fidani.

During last years he took part to several TV programs to tell his cinema experience and acted in two short films. He also took part in a cameo on the comedy film Faccia di Picasso directed by Massimo Ceccherini, in which he played "the only real Pinocchio".

He is very often guest around the schools or children festivals in which he tell his experience of "child-Pinocchio", curiosities and trivia behind the scenes, the special effects and tales regarding the various characters and the staff.

He is the author of the book "Io, il Pinocchio di Comencini" 2008, introduced by Cristina Comencini, and Stefano Garavelli.

== Filmography ==
Year	Title	Role	Notes
1972	Black Turin	Raffaele Rao	Feature film debut
1972	The Adventures of Pinocchio	Pinocchio	Miniseries; lead role (6 episodes)
1973	Kid il monello del West	Kid O'Hara	
1975	Furia nera	Ricky Chandler	
2000	Picasso's Face	Pinocchio	Cameo appearance
2009	Le avventure di Pinocchio: Il documentario	Himself / Pinocchio	Documentary film
2010	L’insegnalibro	Himself	Documentary film
2014	Protagonisti per sempre	Himself	Documentary film
2015	Sogni smontati	Stefano	Short film
2016	Nel buio	Bar patron	Short film

== Discography ==
Balestri recorded three songs:

- "Mamma vorrei"
- "Chi è che ha rubato il mare", by Roberto Vecchioni
- "Andrea Pinocchio", music by Fiorenzo Carpi, the author for all Comencini's Pinocchio music
