= Alessandro Paci =

Italian actor, film director and comedian

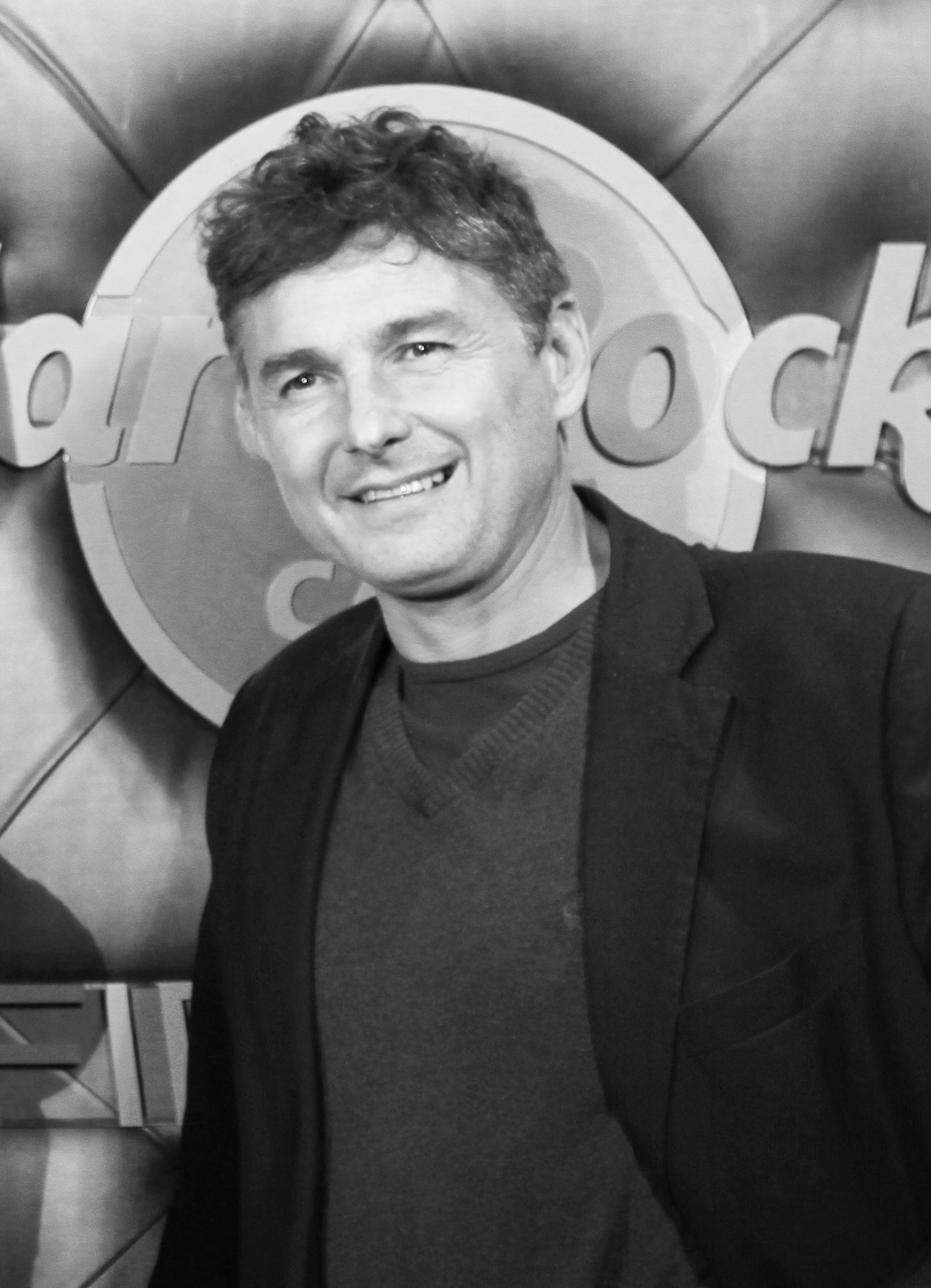
- Born: 21 December 1964 (age 61); Scandicci, Italy
- Years active: 1990–present

Alessandro Paci (born 21 December 1964) is an Italian actor, film director and comedian.

== Biography ==
Tuscan comedian, debuted in the duo Duemendi, with Massimo Ceccherini. He participated in the program Aria Fresca, broadcast on Videomusic (and then on TMC2) in the mid-nineties, playing an improbable bouncer, and ironically on his physique, and he has also brought on stage a comic adaptation of the fable of Pinocchio, and Fermi tutti, questo è uno spettacolo, where he performed with his friend and colleague Massimo Ceccherini: the DVD of the show which became the theater's best-selling DVD of Italy.

== Filmography ==
=== Film ===
- Welcome to Home Gori (1990)
- The Party's Over (1991)
- Amami (1993)
- Bonus malus (1993)
- Dear Goddamned Friends (1994)
- Il grande Fausto (1995)
- Return to Home Gori (1996)
- Albergo Roma (1996)
- Stressati (1997)
- Lucignolo (1999)
- Picasso's Face (2000)
- Andata e ritorno (2003)
- Tutti all'attacco (2005)
- 2061: An Exceptional Year (2007)
- A Beautiful Wife (2007)
- Un'estate al mare (2008)
- Cenci in Cina (2009)
- Me and Marilyn (2009)
- Amici miei – Come tutto ebbe inizio (2011)
- Una vita da sogno (2011)
- La mia mamma suona il rock (2012)
- Sarebbe stato facile (2012)
- Il professor Cenerentolo (2015)
- Gli infami - Episodi di vita quotidiana (2016)
- Se son rose (2018)
- Non ci resta che ridere (2019)
- Pare parecchio Parigi (2023)

=== DVD ===
- Cenerentolo, (2004)
- Gli abiti nuovi del granduca, (2004)
- La nipote di Barbablù, (2005)
- La piccola fiammiferaia, (2006)
- Fave (Quelli di Pinocchio), (2006)
- 10 Ragazze, (2011)
- Oi oi oi che Crisi di Alessandro Paci e Massimo Ceccherini (2012)
- Gli Arrockettati di Alessandro Paci e Massimo Ceccherini (2014)

== Theatre ==
- Cassana (1990/1991)
- Festival dei dilettanti: aspiranti imbianchini (1986/1996)
- Fermi tutti, questo è uno spettacolo, Pinocchio (1997/1998)
- L'uomo dalla "U" alla "O" (1999/2000)
- Grande Paci (2002)
- Quei Bravi Racazzi (2007)
- Pinocchio (2008/2009)
- Ohi…Ohi…Ohi…Ohi… Che Crisi ... (2009/2010)
- Grande Paci (2011/2012)
- Una Bara Per Due (2013)
- Gli Arrockettati (2014/2015)
- Il Peggio di Paci e Ceccherini (2014/2015)

== Television ==
- Jeans (RAI3) (1988)
- La giostra (Rete4) (1989)
- Star 90 (Rete4) (1990)
- Radio Carolina (Italia1) (1991)
- Teledanno (Canale 10) (1993/94)
- AriaFresca (TMC) (1996)
- Su le mani (RaiUno) (1996)
- Va ora in onda (RaiUno) (1997)
- Miss Italia nel mondo (RaiUno) (1997)
- Colorado (RaiUno) (1998)
- Cocco di mamma (RaiUno) (1998)
- Miss Italia nel mondo (RaiUno) (1999)
- Sognando Las Vegas (RaiUno) (2003)
- Domenica in (RaiUno) (2003/04)
- Incapaci d'intendere (Toscana Channel) (2004)
- Il Duello (Toscana Channel) (2005)
- I Fuoriclasse (RaiUno) (2007)
- Stracult (RaiDue) (2009)
- Voglia d'aria fresca (2010)
- Stracult (RaiDue) (2011)
- Ridi col Tubo (italia7) (2011) (2012)
- Attenti al Tubo (Rtv38) (2014) (2015)
- Gran Galà Attenti al tubo (Rtv38) (2014)
- Sabato Cinema (Rtv38) (2014) (2015)
- Due come noi (2015)

== Radio ==
- Manikomio 77 (Radio Rosa) (2015)

== Books ==
- "o un gli tiro" by Alessandro Paci and Massimo Ceccherini - Loggia De' Lanzi (1996)
- "Ridi sul Vaso" by Alessandro Paci - LaNuovaLito (2011)
- "Frank Jabroni nemico pubblico n°9" di Alessandro Paci and "Alessio Nonfanti" - Wizard Productions (2012)
- "Frank Jabroni Public Enemy no 9" di Alessandro Paci e "Alessio Nonfanti" - editore Wizard Productions (2015)
