= Dr. M =

Dr. M. may refer to:

- Dr. M (film), a 1990 film starring Andrew McCarthy
- Dr M or Mahathir Mohamad, fourth and seventh Prime Minister of Malaysia
- Dr. M, the main antagonist of Sly 3: Honor Among Thieves

== See also ==
- Doctor Manhattan, a DC comic book superhero
