= Luisa Ranieri =

Italian actress and television presenter

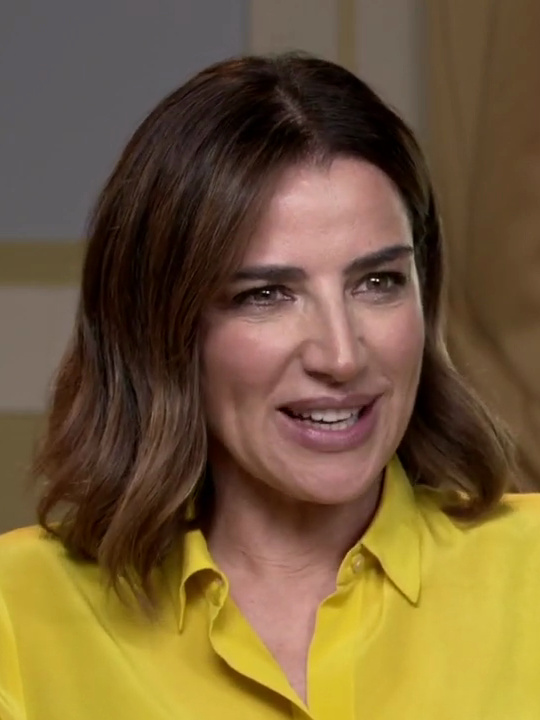
- Ranieri in 2021
- Born: 16 December 1973 (age 52); Naples, Campania, Italy
- Occupation: Actress
- Years active: 2001–present
- Spouse: Luca Zingaretti (m. 2012)
- Children: 2 daughters

Luisa Ranieri (born 16 December 1973) is an Italian actress. She made her breakthrough in Leonardo Pieraccioni's The Prince and the Pirate (2001) before starring in a variety of Rai crime and biographical miniseries. Her other film credits include romantic comedy Letters to Juliet (2011), drama Fasten Your Seatbelts (2014), biographical drama The Music of Silence (2017), thriller Naples in Veils (2017), drama The Hand of God (2021), romantic drama Nuovo Olimpo (2023), and dramas Parthenope and Modì, Three Days on the Wing of Madness (both 2024).

== Callas e Onassis ==
Ranieri is best known for her television movie portrayal of the opera diva Maria Callas in the 2005 Italian television film Callas e Onassis, which began her acting career. Though a number of fiction and nonfiction movies, and documentaries, have been done on the late shipping magnate billionaire Aristotle Onassis, and of Callas, the TV movie Callas e Onassis is the only television or movie depiction ever made exclusively devoted to the public and private deep emotional relationship and close friendship between Onassis and Callas.

== Other appearances ==
Ranieri had a noteworthy acting performance in the 2010 drama film Letters to Juliet as one of Juliet's secretaries, who is the closest to Sophie, played by Amanda Seyfried. She also played the role of Assunta Goretti, the mother of Maria Goretti, in the 2003 film Maria Goretti, an Italian television movie based on real-life events of the Catholic virgin-martyr and saint, Maria Goretti. In 2014, Ranieri hosted the opening and closing nights of the 71st Venice International Film Festival in Venice, Italy.

== Filmography ==
=== Films ===
Film roles showing year released, role played, director and notes
Year	Title	Role	Director	Notes
2001	The Prince and the Pirate	Chiara	Leonardo Pieraccioni	
2003	The Fugitive	Maria	Andrea Manni	
2004	Guardians of the Clouds	Woman	Luciano Odorisio	Uncredited
2004	Eros	Linda	Michelangelo Antonioni	Segment: "Il filo pericoloso delle cose"
2004	Il produttore	Mariapia	Gabriele Mainetti	Short film
2007	SMS - Sotto mentite spoglie	Chiara Munno	Vincenzo Salemme	
2008	Basette	Prisca	Gabriele Mainetti	Short film
2009	The Friends at the Margherita Cafe	Ninni	Pupi Avati	
2010	La vita è una cosa meravigliosa	Laura	Carlo Vanzina	
2010	Letters to Juliet	Isabella	Gary Winick	
2011	Bienvenue à bord	Margherita Cavalieri	Éric Lavaine	
2011	Mozzarella Stories	Sofia	Edoardo De Angelis	
2011	The Immature	Marta	Paolo Genovese	
2012	The Immature: The Trip	Marta	Paolo Genovese	
2012	Lightning Strike	Angela Cacace	Neri Parenti	Segment: "Primo episodio"
2014	Maldamore	Sandra Orlandi	Angelo Longoni	
2014	Fasten Your Seatbelts	Maricla	Ferzan Özpetek	
2016	Forever Young	Sonia	Fausto Brizzi	
2017	The Music of Silence	Edi	Michael Radford	
2017	Veleno	Rosaria	Diego Olivares	
2017	Naples in Veils	Catena	Ferzan Özpetek	
2018	L'affitto	Angela	Antonio Moirin	Short film
2019	Vita segreta di Maria Capasso	Maria Capasso	Salvatore Piscicelli	
2021	Raya and the Last Dragon	Virana (voice)	Don Hall, Carlos Lopez Estrada	Italian voice-over role
2021	The Hand of God	Patrizia	Paolo Sorrentino	
2021	7 Women and a Murder	Maria	Alessandro Genovesi	
2023	Nuovo Olimpo	Titti	Ferzan Özpetek	
2024	Modì, Three Days on the Wing of Madness	Rosalie Tobia	Johnny Depp	
2024	Parthenope	Greta Cool	Paolo Sorrentino	
2024	Diamonds	Alberta Canova	Ferzan Özpetek	
2025	Natale senza Babbo	Margaret	Stefano Cipani	

=== Television ===
Television roles showing year released, role played and notes
Year	Title	Role	Notes
2003	Maria Goretti	Assunta Goretti	Television film
2004	La omicidi	Simona Colli	6 episodes
2005	Cefalonia	Feria	Miniseries
2005	Rockpolitik	Herself/co-host	Variety show
2005	Callas e Onassis	Maria Callas	Miniseries
2007	Boris	Verena	Episode: "Una questione di principio"
2008	'O Professore	Manuela	Miniseries
2008	Amiche mie	Marta	12 episodes
2012–2013	Amore criminale	Herself/host	True crime docu-drama (season 5)
2014	Gli anni spezzati	Gemma Capra	Episode: "Il commissario"
2014	Il giudice meschino	Marina Rossi	Miniseries
2014	A Good Season	Bianca	6 episodes
2016	Luisa Spagnoli	Luisa Spagnoli	Miniseries
2018–2020	La vita promessa	Carmela Rizzo	7 episodes
2021–present	Lolita Lobosco	Lolita Lobosco	Lead role
2026	La Preside	Eugenia Liguori	Lead role

== Awards and nominations ==
Association	Year	Category	Nominated work	Result	Ref.
Ciak d'Oro	2023	Best Actress in a Television Series	Le indagini di Lolita Lobosco	Nominated	
Ciak d'Oro	2024	Best Actress	Diamanti	Won	
David di Donatello	2022	Best Supporting Actress	The Hand of God	Nominated	
Festival International de Programmes Audiovisuels	2006	Best Actress in a Television Series	Cefalonia	Won	
Nastro d'Argento	2008	Best Actress in a Short Film	Basette	Won	
Nastro d'Argento	2018	Best Actress	Veleno	Nominated	
Nastro d'Argento	2022	Best Supportin Actress	The Hand of God	Won	
Nastro d'Argento	2023	Icon Award	Herself	Won	
Premio Flaiano	2023	Best Acting Performance in a Television Series	Le indagini di Lolita Lobosco	Won	
