= The Party's Over (1991 film) =

1991 Italian film by Alessandro Benvenuti

- Directed by: Alessandro Benvenuti
- Written by: Alessandro Benvenuti; Ugo Chiti
- Produced by: Mario Cecchi Gori; Vittorio Cecchi Gori
- Starring: Alessandro Benvenuti; Athina Cenci; Alida Valli
- Cinematography: Cristiano Pogany
- Edited by: Sergio Montanari
- Music by: Patrizio Fariselli
- Distributed by: Variety Distribution
- Release date: 1991
- Language: Italian

The Party's Over (Italian: Zitti e mosca) is a 1991 Italian comedy film written and directed by Alessandro Benvenuti and starring Benvenuti, Athina Cenci, Alida Valli and Massimo Ghini.

== Cast ==
- Alessandro Benvenuti as Ivo
- Athina Cenci as Mara
- Alida Valli as Clara
- Massimo Ghini as Massimo
- Katia Beni as Katia
- Novello Novelli as Corpo
- Laura Caldini as Martina
- Claudio Camiciottoli as Matteo
- Pina Cei as Grandma Zaira
- Sonia Grassi as Annagiulia
- Cosetta Mercatelli as Luisina
- Erika Mazzuoli as Camilla
- Sergio Forconi as Botolo
- Massimo Ceccherini as Kinder
- Alessandro Paci as Brioss
- Daniele Trambusti as Leonardo
- Andrea Muzzi as Giovannino
- Neri Pecchioli as Neri
- Giorgio Picchianti as Bacci
- Leonardo Pieraccioni as Pieraccioni
- Marco Pitera as Walter
- Ugo Bencini as Lampo
- Giorgio Ariani as the speaker at Festa dell'Unità
- Dario Ballantini as the impersonator

== See also ==
- List of Italian films of 1991
