= Francesca Nunzi =

Italian actress

- Born: 27 December 1968 (age 57)
- Occupation: Actress
- Height: 1.70 m (5 ft 7 in)
- Spouse: Otto Buffa
- Children: 1

Francesca Nunzi (born 27 December 1968) is an Italian actress. She graduated at the Laboratory of Performing Exercises under Gigi Proietti and is best known for films such as Tinto Brass' sex comedies, Cheeky and Monella. She has also starred in several TV shows including Il bello delle donne.

== Personal life ==
In 2000, Nunzi married Otto Buffa with whom she has one child.

== Selected filmography ==
=== Film ===
- Oasi (1994)
- Let's Not Keep in Touch (1994)
- Simpatici & antipatici (1998)
- Monella (1998)
- Cheeky (2000)
- E adesso sesso (2001)
- Concrete Romance (2007)
- Un'estate al mare (2008)
- Many Kisses Later (2009)
- Miami Beach (2016)
- Mascarpone: The Rainbow Cake (2024)

=== Television ===
- Una donna per amico (1998)
- Tutti gli uomini sono uguali (1998)
- Il bello delle donne (2001)
- Don Matteo (2002)
