= Me and Marilyn =

- Film poster
- Italian: Io & Marilyn
- Directed by: Leonardo Pieraccioni
- Written by: Leonardo Pieraccioni; Giovanni Veronesi
- Starring: Leonardo Pieraccioni; Suzie Kennedy
- Cinematography: Mark Melville
- Music by: Gianluca Sibaldi
- Release date: 18 December 2009
- Running time: 93 minutes
- Country: Italy
- Language: Italian

Me and Marilyn (Italian: Io & Marilyn) is a 2009 Italian comedy film directed by Leonardo Pieraccioni.

== Premise ==
A divorced man tries to bring back the spirit of Marilyn Monroe by conducting a séance.

== Cast ==
- Leonardo Pieraccioni as Gualtiero Marchesi
- Suzie Kennedy as Marilyn Monroe
- Barbara Tabita as Ramona
- Biagio Izzo as Pasquale
- Marta Gastini as Martina
- Rocco Papaleo as Arnolfo
- Luca Laurenti as Petronio
- Massimo Ceccherini as Massimo
- Francesco Pannofino as the chief of Carabinieri
- Alessandro Paci as the carabiniere
- Niki Giustini as the carabiniere
- Gianna Giachetti as Jolanda
- Francesco Guccini as the psychiatrist

== See also ==
- Marilyn Monroe in popular culture
