= Lorena Forteza =

Colombian model and actress

Perez Nancy Lorena Forteza
- Born: 10 March 1976 (age 50); Bogotá, Colombia
- Years active: 1996–2005

Lorena Forteza (born 10 March 1976) is a Colombian model and actress.

== Biography ==
=== Career ===
She was in The Cyclone directed by Leonardo Pieraccioni, and was in the TV movie Il mondo è meraviglioso in the role of Elena Martinez.

=== Illness ===
She is married to Damiano Spelta a former champion of offshore powerboat racing and after the birth of her son Ruben in 1995 she underwent postpartum depression and her weight increased. She subsequently became the spokesperson for a line of extra large women's clothing.

== Filmography ==
=== Movies ===
- The Cyclone (1996)
- Facciamo fiesta (1997)
- Colpo di stadio (1998)

=== TV series ===
- Il mondo è meraviglioso (2005)
