= Giorgio Panariello =

Italian comedian (born 1960)

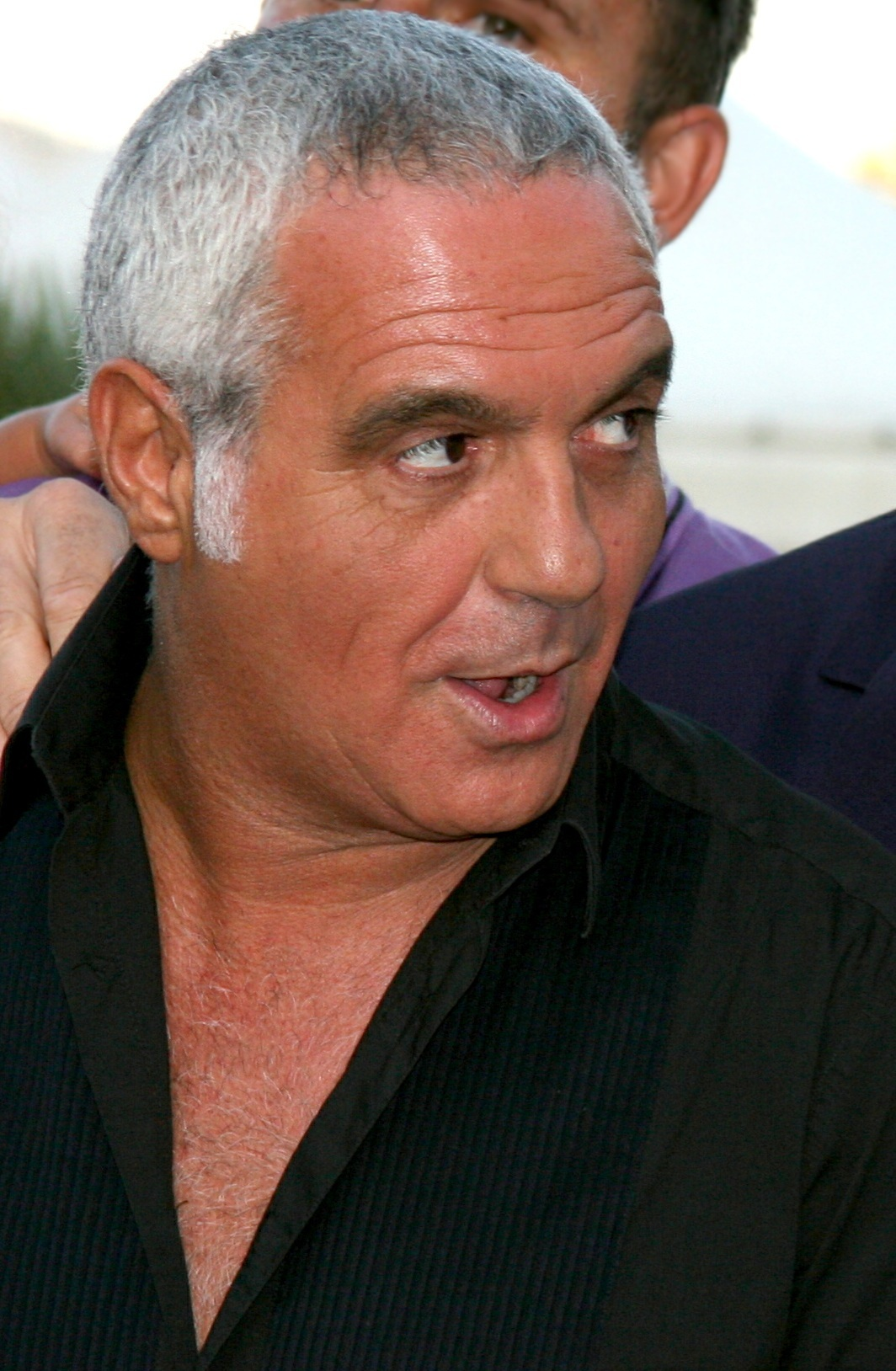
Giorgio Panariello

Giorgio Panariello (born 30 September 1960 in Florence) is an Italian comedian, film and stage actor, director and television presenter.

== Biography ==
Born in Florence to a father of Campanian origin, he raised in Cinquale, a seaside town in the province of Massa-Carrara. During his high school years in Marina di Massa he became close friend with Carlo Conti, disc jockey and local TV presenter, with whom he started his early career as comedian in Versilia. His very first sketches included a parody of singer Renato Zero, a role which gave him popularity and made him debut in RAI television with his friend Conti in the early 1990s.

In 1996 he debuted as film actor in Albergo Roma, directed by Ugo Chiti. In 1999 he directed his first feature, Bagnomaria, a sketch comedy film centered on the characters of his popular stage shows. The film was panned by critics, but was a commercial success and its increasing popularity gained it a cult movie status. His second film At the Right Moment (2000) was instead panned both by critics and audience and failed at the box-office.

He appeared since then in a number of Italian comedy films such as Leonardo Pieraccioni's I Love You in Every Language in the World (2005), Fausto Brizzi's Notte prima degli esami – Oggi (2007) and Vincenzo Salemme's SMS - Sotto mentite spoglie (2007) and No problem (2008).

In 2006 he hosted the 56th Sanremo Music Festival. He was a judge on the programme Tale e quale show.

== His characters ==
- Mario the lifeguard
- Simone the kid
- Merigo the drunk
- PR of Kitikaka Disco of Orbetello
- Lello Splendor
- Signora Italia
- Naomo

== Filmography ==
=== Director ===
- Bagnomaria (1999)
- At the Right Moment (2000)

=== Actor ===
- Cannibali (1995)
- Albergo Roma (1996)
- Finalmente soli (1997)
- Bagnomaria (1999)
- At the Right Moment (2000)
- Chi? (2001)
- I Love You in Every Language in the World (2005)
- Notte prima degli esami – Oggi (2007)
- SMS - Sotto mentite spoglie (2007)
- No problem (2008)
- I mostri oggi (2009)
- Sharm el Sheikh - Un'estate indimenticabile (2010)
- Natale in Sudafrica (2010)
- Amici miei – Come tutto ebbe inizio (2011)
- Un fantastico via vai (2013)
- ... E fuori nevica! (2014)
- Uno per tutti (2015)
- Un weekend artificiale (2026)
