= A Beautiful Wife =

- Film poster
- Italian: Una moglie bellissima
- Directed by: Leonardo Pieraccioni
- Written by: Leonardo Pieraccioni; Giovanni Veronesi
- Starring: Leonardo Pieraccioni; Laura Torrisi
- Cinematography: Italo Petriccione
- Edited by: Stefano Chierchiè
- Music by: Gianluca Sibaldi
- Distributed by: Medusa Distribuzione; Canale 5
- Release date: 14 December 2007
- Running time: 93 minutes
- Country: Italy
- Language: Italian

A Beautiful Wife (Italian: Una moglie bellissima) is a 2007 Italian comedy film directed by Leonardo Pieraccioni.

== Plot ==
Mariano Stoppani is a kind-hearted, simple, and humble fruit and vegetable vendor, while his wife Miranda is beautiful, charming, and ambitious. The couple lives in Anghiari, a small Tuscan town. They've been married for ten years and enjoy a stable and peaceful life, dreaming of moving their business from a street stall to a fixed shop. Mariano divides his time between working at the market and rehearsing for the musical Grease at the town's small theater, where local vendors, shoemakers, and postal workers take on the iconic roles of John Travolta and Olivia Newton-John.

Their lives are disrupted by the arrival of Andrea, a wealthy and attractive photographer who, upon meeting Miranda, is captivated by her beauty and offers her a chance to pose for the Beautiful Life! magazine's sexy calendar. Initially hesitant, Mariano and Miranda eventually agree when Andrea increases the fee, seeing it as an opportunity to raise the money needed for their dream shop. Andrea takes Miranda to the Seychelles for the photo shoot, but Miranda, embarrassed to be photographed in front of her husband, insists that Mariano stay away from the set. Mariano spends his days with the local native Said.

Miranda's calendar shoot is a huge success upon their return to Italy, transforming her from a mere vendor into a local celebrity. The fame and luxury allow Andrea to seduce Miranda, who succumbs to temptation and cheats on her husband. Miranda's feelings become conflicted as she struggles between the stability of her marriage and the glamorous life Andrea offers. The situation remains unresolved until Mariano discovers a love letter from Andrea to Miranda, leading him to the painful truth. Miranda decides to leave Mariano to pursue her star-studded life with Andrea.

A year later, Mariano is still struggling to move on from the marriage's end. Meanwhile, Miranda, now established in the celebrity world, learns that Andrea not only cheats on her but also views her as just another conquest, dismissively calling her "the artichoke woman". Realizing she was merely used, Miranda confronts Andrea at a party, then drives away in a Porsche. Distracted and speeding, she crashes and is rushed to the hospital.

Mariano is notified of the accident and rushes to the hospital, where his friends, who were previously involved in the musical, join him. Miranda undergoes surgery, which involves shortening her leg to fix a femur fracture, leaving her with a slight limp. Mariano remains by her side during this difficult time, and Miranda, moved by his unwavering support, regrets her decision from a year ago. She asks Mariano to return to the life that truly made her happy and fulfilled.

== Cast ==
- Leonardo Pieraccioni as Mariano
- Laura Torrisi as Miranda
- Gabriel Garko as Andrea
- Massimo Ceccherini as Baccano
- Rocco Papaleo as Pomodoro
- Francesco Guccini as the musical's director
- Tony Sperandeo as Don Pierino
- Alessandro Paci as Acciarito
- Chiara Francini as Giustina
- Carlo Pistarino as the vendor
- Paolo Lombardi as Zampaglione
- Luis Molteni as the magazine's director
- Giorgio Ariani as the politician
- Monica Nappo as Benedetta
- Roberto Posse as the Monsignore
- Elena Arvigo as Martina
- Sonia Scotti as Primetta
- Teka Kanga as Said
