= Angelo Russo =

Italian theatre and television actor

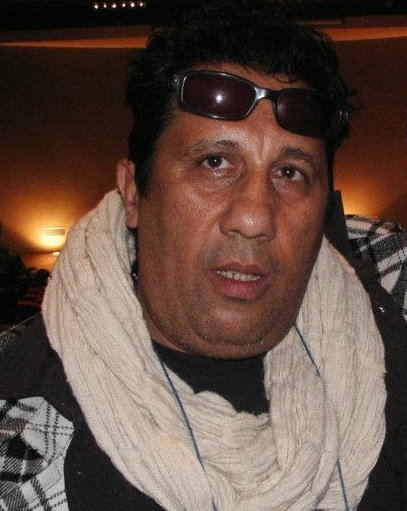
- Born: 21 October 1961 (age 65); Ragusa, Sicily, Italy
- Occupation: Actor
- Years active: 1996–present

Angelo Russo (born 21 October 1961) is an Italian theatre and television actor, and native of Ragusa, Sicily.

Since 1999, Russo has played the comic character of police officer Agatino Catarella in the television series Il commissario Montalbano, based on the characters and novels written by Andrea Camilleri. He played Ciccio Coniglio in five episodes of the 2007 TV mini-series Il Capo dei Capi, and Maresciallo in the 1999 movie Il pesce innamorato, directed by Leonardo Pieraccioni.

== Filmography ==
- L'antenati tua e de Pierino (1996) dir. Gianfranco Iudice, with Alvaro Vitali, Giambattista David, Daniela Mango.
- Psst...silenzio (1997) dir. T. Seminara with Giambattista David.
- The Fish in Love (1999) directed by Leonardo Pieraccioni.
- Inspector Montalbano (1999 – ongoing) television series, directed by Alberto Sironi.
- E adesso sesso (2001) dir. Carlo Vanzina
- Il Capo dei Capi (2007) dir. Enzo Monteleone and Alexis Sweet, television series.
- L'ultima trincea (2009), television series.
- Eroi per caso (2011) television series, dir. Alberto Sironi.
