= Amici miei – Come tutto ebbe inizio =

2011 Italian comedy film

- Film poster
- Directed by: Neri Parenti
- Written by: Piero De Bernardi; Fausto Brizzi; Marco Martani; Neri Parenti
- Produced by: Aurelio De Laurentiis; Luigi De Laurentiis
- Starring: Christian De Sica; Michele Placido; Paolo Hendel; Giorgio Panariello; Massimo Ghini; Massimo Ceccherini; Alessandro Benvenuti
- Narrated by: David Riondino
- Cinematography: Luciano Tovoli
- Edited by: Luca Montanari
- Music by: Andrea Guerra
- Release date: March 18, 2011
- Running time: 105 minutes
- Country: Italy
- Language: Italian

Amici miei – Come tutto ebbe inizio (lit. 'My friends: how it all began') is a 2011 Italian comedy film directed by Neri Parenti.

The film is meant to be a tribute to Mario Monicelli's classic comedy My Friends (1975) and its two sequels, and it is set in 15th-century Florence. The main plot of the film is based on an Italian Renaissance novella known as Novella del Grasso legnaiuolo ("Tale of the Fat Carpenter").

== Cast ==
- Christian De Sica as Filippo
- Michele Placido as Duccio
- Paolo Hendel as Jacopo
- Giorgio Panariello as Cecco
- Massimo Ghini as Manfredo
- Massimo Ceccherini as Alderighi, the carpenter
- Alessandro Benvenuti as Lorenzo de' Medici
- Pamela Villoresi as Piccarda
- Barbara Enrichi as Margarita
- Alessandra Acciai as Madonna Isabetta
- Chiara Francini as Tessa
- Eros Pagni as Adunchi
- Lorenzo Andreaggi as Adunchi's son
- Ainett Stephens as Alyssa
- Luciano Casaredi as Montesecco
- Sergio Forconi as the Magistrate
- Alessandro Paci as the convict
- Giorgio Ariani as the slaver
- Katia Beni as a nun
- Alessandro Mommi as Jacopo's boy
- Andrea Muzzi as the Calcio storico footballer
- David Riondino as the narrator
