= La vita è una cosa meravigliosa =

- Film poster
- Directed by: Carlo Vanzina
- Written by: Carlo Vanzina; Enrico Vanzina
- Starring: Gigi Proietti; Vincenzo Salemme; Enrico Brignano; Nancy Brilli; Luisa Ranieri; Emanuele Bosi; Virginie Marsan
- Edited by: Raimondo Crociani
- Music by: Armando Trovajoli
- Release date: 2 April 2010
- Running time: 103 minutes
- Country: Italy
- Language: Italian

La vita è una cosa meravigliosa (lit. 'Life is a wonderful thing') is a 2010 Italian comedy film directed by Carlo Vanzina.

== Cast ==
- Gigi Proietti as Claudio
- Vincenzo Salemme as Antonio
- Enrico Brignano as Cesare
- Nancy Brilli as Elena
- Luisa Ranieri as Laura
- Emanuele Bosi as Marco
- Virginie Marsan as Vanessa
- Maurizio Mattioli as Prof. Vittorio Manetti
- Gennaro Cannavacciuolo as Mago Venanzio
- Orsetta De Rossi as Federica
- Elisa Di Donna as Alessia, fidanzata di Marco
- Sebastiano Lo Monaco as Prof. Terenzi
- Carlo Fabiano as Luca
- Sidy Diop as Dada
- Julija Majarčuk as Dorina
- Anis Gharbi as Mustafa
- Rodolfo Laganà as Gigi
- Armando De Razza as Dr. Pignoli
- Vincenzo Crocitti as Augusto
- Stefano Antonucci as Giovanni
