= The Graduates (1995 film) =

- Italian theatrical release poster
- Italian: I laureati
- Directed by: Leonardo Pieraccioni
- Written by: Leonardo Pieraccioni; Giovanni Veronesi
- Produced by: Rita Cecchi Gori; Vittorio Cecchi Gori
- Starring: Leonardo Pieraccioni; Massimo Ceccherini; Rocco Papaleo; Gianmarco Tognazzi; Maria Grazia Cucinotta
- Cinematography: Alessandro Pesci
- Edited by: Mirco Garrone
- Production company: Cecchi Gori Group
- Distributed by: Warner Bros. Italia
- Release date: 22 December 1995 (Italy)
- Running time: 88 minutes
- Country: Italy
- Language: Italian
- Box office: 13 billion lire

The Graduates (Italian: I laureati) is a 1995 Italian comedy film directed by Leonardo Pieraccioni.

== Cast ==
- Leonardo Pieraccioni as Leonardo Paci
- Massimo Ceccherini as Pino Noferini
- Rocco Papaleo as Rocco
- Gianmarco Tognazzi as Bruno
- Maria Grazia Cucinotta as Letizia
- Elisabetta Cavallotti as Marta Sperandei
- Tosca D'Aquino as Anna
- Barbara Enrichi as Sonia
- Alessandro Haber as Prof. Galliano
- Sabrina Knaflitz as Cecilia Sperandei
- Adriano Wajskol as Luciano
- Evelina Gori as Giulietta Sperandei
- Manuela Arcuri as BDSM dancer
