= The Fish in Love =

1999 film

- Italian theatrical release poster
- Italian: Il pesce innamorato
- Directed by: Leonardo Pieraccioni
- Written by: Leonardo Pieraccioni; Giovanni Veronesi
- Produced by: Vittorio Cecchi Gori
- Starring: Leonardo Pieraccioni; Yamila Diaz
- Cinematography: Arnaldo Catinari
- Edited by: Mirco Garrone
- Music by: Claudio Guidetti
- Distributed by: Cecchi Gori Group
- Release date: 1999
- Running time: 89 minutes
- Country: Italy
- Language: Italian

The Fish in Love (Italian: Il pesce innamorato) is a 1999 Italian romantic comedy film directed by Leonardo Pieraccioni, who also stars alongside Yamila Diaz.

Pieraccioni stars as Arturo, a writer of children's books, and Diaz stars as Matilde, the woman he falls in love with.

== Plot ==
In Florence, the young carpenter Arturo dreams of becoming a great writer. In fact he has the talent to be able to write fantasy stories for children, and so he is snubbed by Italian critics. However Arturo does not give up, and sends the proofs to a famous Florentine editor. Meanwhile, the family of Arturo is broke because his uncle is gone bankrupt with several useless shops. But fame for Arturo arrives early, because the publisher remains excited about the fantastic stories, and so the book is published with the title: The Fish in Love. Arturo starts to know celebrity and wealth, but soon gets bored, because he feels himself suffocated by the fame. Indeed, Arturo falls in love with beautiful Matilde, promised in marriage to a pompous man of Bergamo. With her, Arturo flees into a house in the woods, and plans a new life, just like in the fairy tales.

== Cast ==
- Leonardo Pieraccioni as Arturo Vannino
- Yamila Diaz as Matilde Ventura
- Paolo Hendel as Primo
- Patrizia Loreti as Signorina Benincasa
- Gabriella Pession as Lucilla Pacini
- Angelo Russo as Maresciallo Scarchilli
- Rodolfo Corsato as Valeriano
- Rosanna Susini as Arturo's mother
- Sergio Forconi as Arturo's father
- Vincenzo Versari as uncle Arnaldo
- Don Lurio as Pacini
- Philippe Leroy as the chauffeur
- Dario Ballantini as Domenico Costanzo
- Hal Yamanouchi as the consul of Korea
