= Il mondo è meraviglioso =

- Starring: Enrico Montesano; Lorena Forteza; Ivo Garrani
- Country of origin: Italy
- Original language: Italian
- No. of episodes: 1

Original release
- Network: Rai Uno
- Release: April 21, 2005

Il mondo è meraviglioso is an Italian television film.

== See also ==
- List of Italian television series
