= Sergio Friscia =

Italian actor, comedian and television presenter (born 1971)

- Born: 27 April 1971 (age 55); Palermo, Sicily, Italy
- Occupations: Actor; comedian; television presenter; radio presenter
- Years active: 1986–present

Sergio Friscia (born 27 April 1971) is an Italian actor, comedian, television presenter and radio host. He began his career as a disc jockey and vocalist in 1986 before working in regional radio and television in Sicily. In 1997, he joined the cast of the Rai 2 comedy variety programme Macao, where he became known for his comic characters. From 2009 to 2019 he co-hosted the Rai 2 programme Mezzogiorno in famiglia and became a presenter of Striscia la notizia on Canale 5 in 2020.

His acting roles include the crime series Squadra antimafia – Palermo oggi, in which he portrayed Nardo Abate, and the Netflix comedy series Framed! A Sicilian Murder Mystery, as well as the films Il professor Cenerentolo, It's the Law, Compromessi sposi and Io e te dobbiamo parlare.

== Filmography ==
=== Film ===
- Intrigo a Cuba (2000)
- Le giraffe (2000)
- Ma l'amore sì! (2006)
- Quell'estate felice (2007)
- Oggi sposi (2009)
- Il professor Cenerentolo (2015)
- Briciole sul mare (2016)
- It's the Law (2017)
- Finalmente sposi (2018)
- Compromessi sposi (2019)
- Tuttapposto (2019)
- Il delitto Mattarella (2020)
- Free (2020)
- So tutto di te (2023)
- Succede anche nelle migliori famiglie (2024)
- Io e te dobbiamo parlare (2024)
- Quasi vera (2026)

=== Television ===
- Il bello delle donne (2000)
- Tequila & Bonetti (2000)
- Carabinieri: Sotto copertura (2005) – miniseries
- Il capo dei capi (2007) – miniseries
- Squadra antimafia – Palermo oggi (2009–2010) – 11 episodes
- Il segreto dell'acqua (2010)
- Anti-Drug Squad (2011–2015)
- The Sunday Woman (2011) – miniseries
- Questo è il mio paese (2015) – miniseries
- Framed! A Sicilian Murder Mystery (2022–2023) – 8 episodes
- So tutto di te (2023)

== Books ==
- Friscia, Sergio (2017). Un girovita da mediano. Come diventare un artista di... un certo peso. Rome: Rai Eri.
