= Natalia Estrada =

Spanish actress (born 1972)

- Born: September 3, 1972 (age 54); Gijón, Asturias, Spain
- Occupation: Actress
- Spouses: Giorgio Mastrota (m. 1992; div. 1998) Andrea Mischianti (m. 2007)
- Children: Natalia Mastrota
- Modeling information
- Height: 1.69 m (5 ft 7 in)
- Hair color: Black
- Eye color: Brown

Natalia Estrada (born September 3, 1972) is a Spanish retired actress, model and television presenter.

== Biography ==
Estrada was born in Gijón on September 3, 1972. When she was 15 she moved to Madrid where she did music and acting classes and became a flamenco and classical ballet dancer.

She had the opportunity to appear with Penélope Cruz on the musical programme La quinta marcha from 1990 to 1991, on the Spanish Telecinco channel.

Estrada was a presenter for the Miss Spain competitions and a presenter for news and soccer telecasts. She jumped to the big screen in 1992, when she was cast in the film Aqui, el que no corre... vuela. She has worked in Italian TV, with roles in Il Quizzone and Campioni di ballo, and made her important debut in a film called Aqui El Que No Corre As Vuela. In 1996 she had her first big hit in The Cyclone. Estrada appeared as herself in a comedy, Paparazzi, and was cast in the musical comedy Jolly Blu. In 2006 she had a small role in El Club de Flo on La Sexta Spanish TV channel.

== Television ==
- "¡Mira quién baila!" (3 episodes)

Episode dated 8 January 2007 (8 January 2007) - Herself

- "Club de Flo, El" (5 episodes)

Episode dated 26 May 2006 (26 May 2006) - Herself Episode dated 12 September 2006 (12 September 2006) - Herself

- "Tan a gustito" (1 episode)

Episode #1.2 (30 October 2005) - Herself

- "Corazón de..." (1 episode)

Episode dated 20 September 2005 (20 September 2005) - Herself

- "La Noche abierta," (1 episode)

Episode dated 20 December 2001 (20 December 2001) - Herself

- "Bellezas al agua" (9 episodes)

Episode dated 4 July 1992 (4 July 1992) - Host

== Filmography ==
- Hora final (1992)
- Aquí, el que no corre...vuela (1992)
- "Bellezas al agua" (9 episodes, 1992)
- The Cyclone (1996)
- Jolly Blu (1998)
- Olé (2006)

== See also ==
- Almudena Fernandez
- Sonia Ferrer
- Ana Alvarez
