= Framed! A Sicilian Murder Mystery =

Italian television series

- Season 2 release poster
- Italian: Incastrati
- Genre: Crime comedy
- Created by: Ficarra and Picone
- Written by: Ficarra and Picone
- Starring: Salvatore Ficarra: Valentino Picone
- Country of origin: Italy
- Original language: Italian
- No. of series: 2
- No. of episodes: 12

Production
- Producers: Ficarra and Picone

Original release
- Network: Netflix
- Release: 1 January 2022 – 2 March 2023

Framed! A Sicilian Murder Mystery (Italian: Incastrati) is a 2022 Italian television series starring the comedy duo Ficarra e Picone. The first season was released in Italy on Netflix on January 1, 2022, and internationally on January 27, 2022, and the second season was released on 2 March 2023.

== Cast ==
- Salvatore Ficarra as Salvatore
- Valentino Picone as Valentino
- Marianna Di Martino as Agata
- Anna Favella as Ester
- Leo Gullotta as Nicolosi
- Sergio Friscia as Sergione
- Tony Sperandeo as Tonino Macaluso
- Maurizio Marchetti as Martorana
- Filippo Luna as Lo Russo
- Domenico Centamore as Don Lorenzo
- Sasà Salvaggio as Alberto Gambino

== Awards and nominations ==
Year	Award	Category	Nominee	Result	Ref.
2023	Nastri d'Argento Grandi Serie	Best Comedy Series	Framed! A Sicilian Murder Mystery	Nominated	
2023	Nastri d'Argento Grandi Serie	Best Supporting Actor	Tony Sperandeo	Nominated	
