= Bonus malus (film) =

- Directed by: Vito Zagarrio
- Written by: Francesco Bruni; Luigi Guarnieri; Enzo Monteleone; Vito Zagarrio
- Produced by: Maurizio Mattei
- Starring: Claudio Bigagli
- Cinematography: Renato Tafuri
- Edited by: Cecilia Zanuso
- Music by: Antonio Di Pofi
- Distributed by: Istituto Luce-Italnoleggio Cinematografico
- Release date: September 7, 1993
- Running time: 93 minutes
- Country: Italy
- Language: Italian

Bonus malus is a 1993 Italian comedy film directed by Vito Zagarrio.

== Cast ==
- Claudio Bigagli as Marco Altoviti
- Gigio Alberti as Andrea
- Felice Andreasi as Marco's father
- Lorella De Luca as Marco's mother
- Claudio Bisio as Baldini
- Giulia Boschi as Valeria
- Claudio Botosso as the doctor
- Athina Cenci as Carletti
- Francesca D'Aloja as Paola
- Antonella Fattori as Cristina
- Lino Miccichè as the professor
- Novello Novelli as Cecchi
- Leonardo Pieraccioni as Nedo
- Massimo Ceccherini as Nedo's friend
- Alessandro Paci as Nedo's friend
- Carlo Monni as Gambacciani
- Nina Soldano as Gambacciani's secretary
