= I Love You in Every Language in the World =

- Italian theatrical release poster
- Italian: Ti amo in tutte le lingue del mondo
- Directed by: Leonardo Pieraccioni
- Written by: Leonardo Pieraccioni; Giovanni Veronesi
- Starring: Leonardo Pieraccioni; Giorgio Panariello; Marjo Berasategui; Rocco Papaleo; Massimo Ceccherini; Giulia Elettra Gorietti
- Cinematography: Leonardo Pieraccioni
- Edited by: Leonardo Pieraccioni; Giovanni Veronesi
- Release date: 16 December 2005
- Running time: 100 minutes
- Country: Italy
- Language: Italian

I Love You in Every Language in the World (Italian: Ti amo in tutte le lingue del mondo) is a 2005 Italian romantic comedy film directed by Leonardo Pieraccioni.

== Plot ==
Gilberto Rovai, a teacher of physical education at a school in Pistoia, throws a surprise birthday party for his wife. However, when his wife is about to enter their home, she takes a phone call and Gilberto and his friends discover that she is having an affair. They divorce, and Gilberto goes to live with his stuttering brother Cateno, a swimming enthusiast and a janitor at Gilberto's school.

One year later, Paolina, a student of Gilberto's, becomes infatuated with him. Paolina texts him constantly with "I love you" messages in all the languages of the world. The principal of the school believes that Gilberto is in a relationship with Paolina and tries to transfer him to Borgo a Buggiano.

One evening, convinced by Anselmi, a colleague, Gilberto attends a swingers party only to find himself paired with his ex-wife. Disgusted, he leaves the party he sees a man argue and slap a woman. He befriends the woman, Margherita, and they begin to see each other regularly. One day, Gilberto discovers that Margherita is the mother of Paolina, the girl who is infatuated with him. The surprise meeting between the two has devastating effects: Gilberto faints in shock and is taken to hospital, while Paolina reacts very badly and argues with her mother. Gilberto's friend, the psychologist Bellucci, tells Gilberto that Paolina is attracted to him because she sees him as the father she has never met, and believes dead.

But Paolina's father is not dead and is now a friar, Brother Massimo, who is unaware of the existence of his daughter. Gilberto wants Margherita to tell Paolina (and the friar) the truth but she thinks it a bad idea. Gilberto then arranges a meeting between Massimo and Paolina but Massimo cannot get himself to tell her the truth about their relationship. When, finally, Margherita reveals the truth, Paolina attacks Gilberto and stones his car. He comforts her with a hug. The school principal see this and takes it as confirmation that the two are in a relationship and forces Gilberto to move to Borgo a Buggiano.

Several months later Gilberto is visited by Margherita. Cateno had sent her the many love letters that Gilberto had written, but not sent, her. Knowing that he loves her, she decides to move to Borgo a Buggiano. Meanwhile, Paolina finds her love in the son of the psychologist Bellucci.

== Cast ==
- Leonardo Pieraccioni as Gilberto Rovai
- Giorgio Panariello as Cateno
- Marjo Berasategui as Margherita
- Rocco Papaleo as Prof. Anselmi
- Massimo Ceccherini as Brother Massimo
- Giulia Elettra Gorietti as Paolina
- Barbara Tabita as Debora
- Francesco Guccini as the Principal
- Marco Spiga as Bellucci
- Nicolas Vaporidis as Bellucci's son
- Barbara Enrichi as Betty uno
- Cristina Bignardi as Prof. Fabiani
- Monica Dugo as Priscilla
- Gaetano Gennai as Ugo Panerai
- Pietro Ghislandi as the traffic policeman
- Francesco Tricarico, Carlo Conti, Paolo Beldì and Giovanni Veronesi as the friars

== Production ==
=== Filming ===
The film was shot in Pistoia, Tuscany, while the scenes at the amusement park were filmed in Gardaland.
