= Pare parecchio Parigi =

2024 Italian comedy film

- Directed by: Leonardo Pieraccioni
- Written by: Filippo Bologna; Leonardo Pieraccioni; Alessandro Riccio
- Starring: Leonardo Pieraccioni; Chiara Francini; Giulia Bevilacqua; Nino Frassica
- Cinematography: Fabrizio Lucci
- Edited by: Patrizio Marone
- Music by: Gianluca Sibaldi
- Distributed by: 01 Distribution
- Release date: 18 January 2024
- Country: Italy
- Language: Italian

Pare parecchio Parigi (transl. It looks a lot like Paris) is a 2024 Italian comedy film directed by Leonardo Pieraccioni, and starring Pieraccioni, Chiara Francini, Giulia Bevilacqua, and Nino Frassica.

The film was released in Italy on 18 January 2024.

== Plot ==
In Florence, Bernardo, Giovanna, and Ivana are three siblings who haven't spoken to each other for years and have a terrible relationship with their father, university professor Arnaldo Cannistraci. When their father suddenly falls ill and is hospitalized, the three siblings realize that there is little time left to try to mend the relationships that have been lost since their mother's death. Their father has always expressed a desire to take a trip together to Paris, but his condition does not allow for too much adventurous travel. Therefore, the Cannistraci siblings decide to stage a camper trip towards Paris without ever actually leaving Bernardo's ranch.

During the fake trip, the three siblings begin to bond with each other and last establish a dialogue with their father, despite the surreal attempts to make him believe they are traveling through Italy and France. Ivana finally reveals her homosexuality, while Giovanna decides to end a relationship with Mirko, a much younger man. Bernardo, on the other hand, discovers a secret: he is not Arnaldo's son but the result of his mother Anna's clandestine affair with a neighbor, Walter Vannuccini.

The news of the camper driving in circles outside Florence catches the attention of the authorities and the media. The story of the Cannistraci siblings goes viral on social media, and groups of people flock to follow the camper as it nears its "arrival" in Paris. The Head of the hospital, worried about Arnaldo's health, alerts the Carabinieri to stop the camper and bring the elderly professor back to the hospital. The three siblings, strengthened by their new bond, decide not to stop at the checkpoint and bypass the authorities. However, the camper swerves and crashes into a high-voltage tower. No one is hurt. The father realizes that he never left the ranch but is content nonetheless. The three siblings, dazed from the impact, burst into laughter as they realize they have reached the "Eiffel Tower".

== Cast ==
- Leonardo Pieraccioni as Bernardo Cannistraci
- Chiara Francini as Giovanna Cannistraci
- Giulia Bevilacqua as Ivana Cannistraci
- Nino Frassica as Arnaldo Cannistraci
- Massimo Ceccherini as the neighbour
- Gianni D'Addario as Corporal Bartezzani
- Giancarlo Ratti as the Head Doctor
- Massimiliano Galligani as Massimiliano
- Giuseppe Gandini as Tonio
- Alessandro Riccio as Paolino
- Marta Richeldi as the flight attendant
- Giorgio Borghetti as the pilot
- Alessio Binetti as the co-pilot
- Gabriele Careddu as Mirko
- Gianna Giachetti as the neighbour's mother
- Gianmaria Vassallo as the Carabiniere
- Gaia Nanni as Antonella, the journalist
- Gioele Rotini as the cameraman
- Eleonora Di Miele as the Head's assistant
- Giorgia Tomasi as a prostitute
- Dalia Kalala as Odile
- Giorgia Trasselli as Anna Cannistraci
- Sergio Forconi as Magnolfi
- Andrea Muzzi as the waiter
- Nina Pons as Annina
- Gianni Franco as Walter Vannuccini
- Alessandro Paci as the motorcyclist
- Angelica Massera as the motorcyclist
- Ludovica Baiardi as the university student
- Antonio Lo Cascio as the nurse at the hospital
- Michele Lombardi as the paramedic
- Teresa Magni as Mrs. Degrani
- Giovanni Serni as Mr. Loder
- Alessio Scali as Brogio
