= Yuliya Mayarchuk =

Ukrainian actress

- Born: Ю́лія Маярчу́к; April 20, 1977 (age 49); Nikolayev, Ukrainian SSR, Soviet Union

Yuliya Mayarchuk (Ukrainian: Ю́лія Маярчу́к, romanized: Yuliia Maiarchuk; born April 20, 1977) is a Ukrainian actress.

She had the lead role in the 2000 movie Trasgredire by Tinto Brass.

== Filmography ==
- 1999: Sogno
- 2000: Picasso's Face
- 2000: Trasgredire (Cheeky)
- 2000: La Squadra, TV show
- 2002: L'Italiano
- 2006: Il rumore delle molliche
- 2007: In nome di Maria
- 2007: Go Go Tales
- 2010: La vita è una cosa meravigliosa
- 2016: Inspector Montalbano, TV show
- 2017: La porta rossa, TV show
- 2019: Passpartù - Operazione Doppiozero
