= Picasso's Face =

- Directed by: Massimo Ceccherini
- Written by: Massimo Ceccherini; Giovanni Veronesi
- Starring: Massimo Ceccherini; Alessandro Paci; Marco Giallini; Bianca Guaccero; Yuliya Mayarchuk
- Cinematography: Giovanni Canevari
- Edited by: Alessio Doglione
- Music by: Riccardo Galardini
- Release date: 2000
- Running time: 95 minutes
- Country: Italy
- Language: Italian

Picasso's Face (Italian: Faccia di Picasso) is a 2000 comedy film written, directed and starring Massimo Ceccherini.

== Plot ==
Massimo Ceccherini is looking for a plot for his new movie: the suggestions of the people around him are all the same and they indicate "less vulgarity" and "more gags". In the end, he just settles for a long series of homages, ranging from the Rocky film series to Jaws, redone in a picaresque way.

== Cast ==
- Massimo Ceccherini as himself
- Alessandro Paci as Himself
- Marco Giallini as Producer
- Bianca Guaccero as Samantha
- Pietro Fornaciari as Fernando Capecchi
- Chiara Conti as Stefania Nobili
- Yuliya Mayarchuk as Ukraine Girl
- Giovanni Veronesi as Priest
- Vincenzo Salemme as Himself
- Andrea Balestri as Pinocchio / Himself
- Christian Vieri as Ivan Drago
