= Il sesso degli angeli =

2022 Italian comedy film

- Italian theatrical release poster
- Directed by: Leonardo Pieraccioni
- Written by: Filippo Bologna; Leonardo Pieraccioni
- Starring: Leonardo Pieraccioni; Sabrina Ferilli; Marcello Fonte; Massimo Ceccherini
- Cinematography: Fabrizio Lucci
- Edited by: Patrizio Marone
- Release date: 21 April 2022
- Running time: 91 minutes
- Country: Italy
- Language: Italian
- Box office: €1.51 million

Il sesso degli angeli (lit. 'The sex of the angels') is a 2022 Italian comedy film directed by Leonardo Pieraccioni.

== Plot ==
Don Simone is a Florentine parish priest whose church suffers serious damage due to water leaks. His fortunes seem to change when, right after the ceiling collapse, a notary brings him the news that his uncle Waldemaro has left him a successful business in Switzerland, though he does not specify what it is. Simone has one week to accept the inheritance or pass it on to his cousin Antonello.

Simone, accompanied by his loyal sacristan Giacinto, travels to Lugano, only to discover the shocking truth: the business in question is a brothel, legal in the country and managed by the beautiful Lena along with other working girls. Initially hiding his identity as a priest, Simone finds himself increasingly conflicted. This inner turmoil is compounded by visions of his uncle encouraging him to abandon his clerical duties and by the growing affection between himself and Lena, as well as between Giacinto and Margò, one of the brothel's workers.

At the end of the week granted by the will, and after revealing his true profession, Simone decides to return to Florence. However, just before abandoning the inheritance, he discovers a legal loophole: the building, originally constructed as a kindergarten, had never changed its designated use. Simone keeps the inheritance and, blackmailing a public official who, unbeknownst to his wife, was a client of the brothel, converts the establishment into a private nursery. He uses the profits from this new venture to fund various charitable works in Africa, thereby calming the unrest of the Curia. He also helps Lena change her life, ensuring she can visit her son more frequently, who is in foster care at a family home in Bologna.

== Cast ==
- Leonardo Pieraccioni as Don Simone
- Sabrina Ferilli as Lena
- Marcello Fonte as Giacinto
- Massimo Ceccherini as uncle Waldemaro
- Maitè Yanes as Bella
- Gabriela Giovanardi as Margò
- Eva Moore as Ameriga
- Giulia Perulli as Mimì
- Valentina Pegorer as Alessia
- Alessio Scali as Finizio
- Massimiliano Vado as Arnaldo Mozart
- Bruno Santini as Bacci
- Gaia Nanni as the American parish girl
- Fabien Lucciarini as Father Castoldi
- Manlio Dovì as Giovanni
- Vincenzo Salemme as Antonello
