= Don Lurio =

American-Italian dancer (1929–2003)

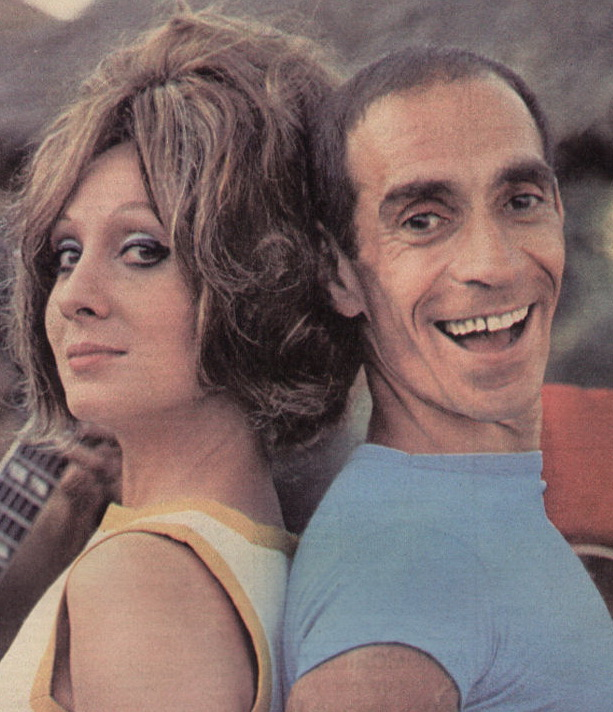
- Lurio (right) with Rossella Como in 1965
- Born: Donald Benjamin Lurio; 15 November 1929; New York City, U.S.
- Died: 26 January 2003 (aged 73); Rome, Italy
- Occupations: Dancer; choreographer; actor; singer; television presenter
- Years active: 1959–2003
- Partner: Livio Costagli (1974–1994)
- Musical career
- Genres: Musical theatre
- Instrument: Vocals
- Labels: Dischi Ricordi; Ariston Records

Donald Benjamin Lurio (15 November 1929 – 26 January 2003) was an American-born Italian dancer, choreographer, actor, singer and television presenter for RAI, the Italian radio and television public service.

== Biography ==
Born in New York City in a family of Italian Jewish origin, Lurio operated a dance studio on Broadway theatre with Bob Fosse and Jack Cole. In 1957 the group toured Europe and Lurio decided to settle in Italy. He appeared in several Italian films and TV shows in the 1960s and 1970s. He also appeared in a handful of British films. He choreographed the interval act for the Eurovision Song Contest 1970 with his ensemble, The Don Lurio Dancers. One of his most popular numbers, the song "Testa, Spalla" ("Head, Shoulder"), was premiered on the show Hai visto mai? in 1973 when performed in a duet with showgirl Lola Falana.

Openly gay (which was considered scandalous at the time, and not only in Italy), Lurio had a long-term relationship with Livio Costagli, who died in 1994 at the age of 44 years from complications caused by AIDS.

Lurio died in Rome in 2003 from respiratory failure. As his will, the National Dance Academy in Rome has a grant named after him.

== Selected filmography ==
- Casinò de Paris (1957)
- Rocco e le sorelle (1961)
- Pugni pupe e marinai (1961)
- Toto's First Night (1962)
- Canzoni a tempo di twist (1962)
- Il magnifico Bobo (1967)
- "FF.SS." – Cioè: "...che mi hai portato a fare sopra a Posillipo se non mi vuoi più bene?" (1982)
- Arrivano i miei (1982)
- Quo vadiz? (1984)
- The Fish in Love (1999)
