= Anti-Drug Squad =

2011 Italian television series

- Italian: Caccia al re - La narcotici
- Genre: Crime drama
- Created by: Leonardo Fasoli
- Directed by: Michele Soavi
- Starring: Gedeon Burkhard; Raffaella Rea; Stefano Dionisi; Sergio Friscia; Alina Nedelea; Denis Fasolo; Valentino Campitelli; Libero De Rienzo; Giampiero Mancini; Laura Glavan; Marco Giuliani; Ricky Memphis; Michele D'Anca; Bruno Conti; Andrea Miglio Risi; Francesco Ferrazza; Dafne Barbieri; Alessandro Borghi; Jacopo Troiani; Massimo Poggio; Thomas Trabacchi; Giorgio Caputo; Alessandro Sperduti; Giulio Cristini; Caterina Shulha; Margherita Vicario; Eleonora Sergio; Fabrizio Traversa; Giovanna Rei; Lorenza Guerrieri; Luca Terraciano; Manuele Labate; Bruno Armando; Barbara De Nuntis; Valentina Bellè
- Country of origin: Italy
- No. of seasons: 2
- No. of episodes: 12

Original release
- Network: RAI 1
- Release: January 16, 2011 – March 19, 2015

Anti-Drug Squad (Italian: Caccia al re - La narcotici) is an Italian television crime series, which follows Daniele Piazza (Gedeon Burkhard) as the head of a narcotics division in Rome. It originally aired in six episodes on Rai 1 from January 16 to February 8, 2011 and was followed by a second season entitled Challenge to the sky (Sfida al cielo) in 2015.

The first season of La narcotici was produced by Italy's Good Time SRL and the second season was co-produced by Good Time SRL with Germany's Beta production. Created by Leonardo Fasoli (Gomorrah) and written and directed by Michele Soavi, both seasons of Anti-Drug Squad are currently airing on MHz Choice and Amazon Prime, in Italian with English subtitles.

== Plot ==
Deputy Police Chief Daniele Piazza (Gedeon Burkhard), aka Lupo, is put in charge of leading the narcotics section, after the former head of Narcotics was arrested for corruption.

Piazza has been working in the anti-robbery section while living with his daughter Sara (Laura Glavan). The first season opens with a flashback showing the death of Piazza's wife in a hit-and-run accident 13 years earlier, when their daughter was 4. The vehicle that killed his wife was being driven by a bank robber (Stefano Dionisi) fleeing the scene of Rome's biggest bank heist. The 35 Billion Lire from that bank heist turns out to have provided the capital for launching the Eighth King of Rome's drug empire.

Thus, from the very beginning, we learn that the Eighth King of Rome is the man who murdered, then-Deputy Inspector Piazza's wife.

=== First season - Hunting the King (Caccia al Re) ===
The drug lord referred to as King in the title is referred to in the series as The Eighth King of Rome. The first seven kings of Rome ruled from 753 BC, when Rome was founded, to 509 BC, when the kingdom was overthrown and Rome became a Republic.

=== Second season - Challenge to the sky (Sfida al cielo) ===
It's been about 4 years since the events of the first series.

== Cast ==
Deputy Police Chief Piazza's team are

1. Inspector Daria Lucente (Raffaella Rea) - She led the investigation that convicted her former boss. She is the second in command of the new built unit, in season 2, after the death of her boss, will be promoted to Deputy Chief and put in charge of the unit
2. Deputy Inspector Salvo Sciarpa, aka Conte (Sergio Friscia) - Veteran officer who was a non-corrupt member of old Anti-Drug Squad. He took part in the operation that convicted the former Anti-Drug Squad chief, alongside Inspector Lucente
3. Lieutenant Eva Crete, aka Mila (Alina Nedelea) - Bulgarian chemist from the scientific investigation section
4. Police Officer Anselmo Rocca, aka Snoopy (Denis Fasolo) - Marksman, he comes from the special intervention team involved in the operation that convicted the former Anti-Drug Squad chief
5. Police Officer Paolo Corsi, aka Corsaro (Valentino Campitelli) - He is the technical operator of the team. He's also a champion gamer and the youngest member of the police force at 19

The Eighth King of Rome, aka Ivano Consanti (Stefano Dionisi).

== See also ==
- List of Italian television series
