= Un fantastico via vai =

2013 film

- Film poster
- Directed by: Leonardo Pieraccioni
- Written by: Leonardo Pieraccioni; Paolo Genovese
- Starring: Leonardo Pieraccioni; Serena Autieri; Maurizio Battista; Marco Marzocca; Massimo Ceccherini; Giorgio Panariello
- Cinematography: Fabrizio Lucci
- Edited by: Consuelo Catucci
- Music by: Gianluca Sibaldi
- Distributed by: 01 Distribution
- Release date: December 12, 2013
- Running time: 95 minutes
- Country: Italy
- Language: Italian

Un fantastico via vai (lit. 'A fantastic coming and going') is a 2013 Italian comedy film directed by Leonardo Pieraccioni.

== Cast ==
- Leonardo Pieraccioni as Arnaldo
- Serena Autieri as Anita
- Maurizio Battista as Giovannelli
- Marco Marzocca as Esposito
- Marianna Di Martino as Camilla
- Chiara Mastalli as Anna
- Giuseppe Maggio as Marco
- David Sef as Edoardo
- Alice Bellagamba as Clelia
- Massimo Ceccherini as Anna's father
- Giorgio Panariello as Cavalier Mazzarra
- Enzo Iacchetti as Monsignore
- Alessandro Benvenuti as the man on the bus
