= Se son rose =

2018 Italian comedy film

- Theatrical release poster
- Directed by: Leonardo Pieraccioni
- Written by: Filippo Bologna; Leonardo Pieraccioni; Giovanni Veronesi; Domenico Costanzo
- Starring: Leonardo Pieraccioni; Michela Andreozzi; Elena Cucci; Caterina Murino; Claudia Pandolfi; Gabriella Pession; Mariasole Pollio; Antonia Truppo
- Cinematography: Fabrizio Lucci
- Edited by: Patrizio Marone
- Music by: Gianluca Sibaldi
- Distributed by: Medusa Film
- Release date: 29 November 2018
- Running time: 90 minutes
- Country: Italy
- Language: Italian

Se son rose (lit. 'If they are roses') is a 2018 Italian romantic comedy film directed by Leonardo Pieraccioni. and written by Filippo Bologna, Leonardo Pieraccioni, Giovanni Veronesi and Domenico Costanzo.

== Cast ==
- Leonardo Pieraccioni as Leonardo Giustini
- Michela Andreozzi as Angelica
- Elena Cucci as Ginora
- Caterina Murino as Benedetta
- Claudia Pandolfi as Fabiola
- Gabriella Pession as Elettra
- Mariasole Pollio as Yolanda
- Antonia Truppo as Fioretta
- Nunzia Schiano as Signora Coscia
- Sergio Pierattini as Monsignore
- Gianluca Guidi as Fabio
- Vincenzo Salemme as Signor Formisano
- Jonis Bascir as Samir
- Alessandro Paci as an officer
