= The Prince and the Pirate =

2001 film by Leonardo Pieraccioni

- Italian theatrical release poster
- Italian: Il principe e il pirata
- Directed by: Leonardo Pieraccioni
- Written by: Leonardo Pieraccioni; Giovanni Veronesi
- Produced by: Vittorio Cecchi Gori
- Starring: Leonardo Pieraccioni; Massimo Ceccherini
- Cinematography: Maurizio Calvesi
- Edited by: Stefano Chierchiè
- Music by: Edoardo Bennato
- Release date: 14 December 2001
- Running time: 90 minutes
- Country: Italy
- Language: Italian

The Prince and the Pirate (Italian: Il principe e il pirata) is a 2001 Italian comedy film directed by and starring Leonardo Pieraccioni.

== Plot ==
Leopoldo is a separate teacher and learns of his father's death. Once arrived at the morgue, however, the parent wakes up and says he just wants to pretend to be dead to escape from their creditors. The father escapes abroad and leaves to his son a videotape, from which emerges that Leopoldo has a secret brother who was born 35 years earlier by an extramarital affair with a janitor: Melchiorre called "Gimondi" who is serving several years in prison. The two brothers meet to sell his father's inheritance, and embark on a long car trip from Palermo to Saint Vincent.

== Cast ==
- Leonardo Pieraccioni as Leopoldo Natali
- Massimo Ceccherini as Melchiorre Gimondi
- Luisa Ranieri as Luisa
- Melanie Gerren as Melanie
- Giorgio Picchianti as Pierino
- Claudio Angelini as Ubaldo
- Lucio Allocca as Don Capece
- Silvan as himself
