= Beatrice Macola =

Italian actress (1965–2001)

- Macola in 1999
- Born: 2 December 1965; Verona, Italy
- Died: 13 December 2001 (aged 36); Rome, Italy
- Occupation: Actress

Beatrice Macola (2 December 1965 – 13 December 2001) was an Italian actress.

== Life and career ==
Born in Verona into a noble family, after her accountancy studies Macola decided to pursue an acting career against the wishes of her father.

After several roles on stage she became first known for the Pupi Avati's 1986 variety show Hamburgher serenade that she hosted together with Nik Novecento. Her film roles include Claude Chabrol's Doctor M, Mario Monicelli's Dear Goddamned Friends and Steven Spielberg's Schindler's List, in which she played the role of Ingrid, the German lover of Oskar Schindler.

She died on 13 December 2001, at age 36, after 10 days in a coma following a cerebral infarction.

== Filmography ==
- Mak P 100 (1988)
- Sindrome veneziana (1989)
- Doctor M (1990) as Anna
- Das tätowierte Herz (1991)
- Schindler's List (1993) as Ingrid
- Lo sconosciuto (1993)
- La primavera negli occhi (1994) as Betti
- Dear Goddamned Friends (1994) as Testa di rapa
- Corti stellari (1997) as (segment "Doom")
- Buck and the Magic Bracelet (1998) as Isaia
- La strategia della maschera (1999) as Adriane Lindner
- La fame e la sete (1999) as Interpreter
- Hostage (1999) as Eveline (final film role)
