= Viola Kisses Everybody =

Viola Kisses Everybody (Viola bacia tutti) (orig.)
- Italian poster
- Directed by: Giovanni Veronesi
- Written by: Giovanni Veronesi; Rocco Papaleo
- Produced by: Vittorio Cecchi Gori; Rita Rusic (as Rita Cecchi Gori)
- Starring: Asia Argento; Massimo Ceccherini; Valerio Mastandrea; Rocco Papaleo
- Cinematography: Fabio Cianchetti
- Edited by: Cecilia Zanuso
- Music by: Aldo De Scalzi; Pivio
- Distributed by: Cecchi Gori Distribuzione
- Release date: 1998
- Running time: 93 minutes
- Country: Italy
- Language: Italian

Viola Kisses Everybody (Viola bacia tutti) is a 1998 Italian romantic comedy film directed by Giovanni Veronesi.

Leonardo Pieraccioni makes a cameo role in the film as a tourist who asks Massimo Ceccherini information about a beach.

== Plot ==
Three friends: Max (Massimo Ceccherini), Samuele (Valerio Mastandrea) and Nicola (Rocco Papaleo) go on holiday in their caravan. During the trip, Viola (Asia Argento), who has just robbed a bank, accosts the campers and takes them hostage. Initially the three are frightened, but gradually gain confidence with the girl and they become friends. Finally they decide to help her dispose of the priceless coins from the robbery.

== Cast ==
- Asia Argento: Viola
- Valerio Mastandrea: Samuele
- Rocco Papaleo: Nicola 'Swing'
- Massimo Ceccherini: Max
- Enzo Robutti: Giotto
- Daria Nicolodi: Sibilla
- Franco Califano: Father of Samuele
- Daniela Poggi: Amanda
- Leonardo Pieraccioni: Tourist
