= The Cyclone (1996 film) =

The Cyclone - Il Ciclone
- Italian theatrical release poster
- Italian: Il ciclone
- Directed by: Leonardo Pieraccioni
- Written by: Leonardo Pieraccioni; Giovanni Veronesi
- Produced by: Vittorio Cecchi Gori; Rita Rusić
- Starring: Leonardo Pieraccioni; Lorena Forteza
- Cinematography: Roberto Forza
- Edited by: Mirco Garrone
- Music by: Claudio Guidetti
- Production company: Cecchi Gori Group
- Distributed by: Cecchi Gori Group
- Release date: 12 December 1996
- Running time: 86 minutes
- Country: Italy
- Language: Italian
- Box office: 78 billion lire (Italy)

The Cyclone (Italian: Il ciclone) is a 1996 Italian romantic comedy film, co-written, directed by and starred by Leonardo Pieraccioni.

== Plot ==
Tuscany, June 1996. Levante Quarini (Leonardo Pieraccioni) is a young accountant who lives a routine life and has unhappy relationships with women. He lives with his father Osvaldo (Sergio Forconi), his brother Libero (Massimo Ceccherini) and his lesbian sister Selvaggia (Barbara Enrichi) on a lonely residence surrounded by corn fields. His only friend is his grandfather Gino (voiced by Mario Monicelli), who only communicates by shouting out of his window. They are far from the major roads and signs are far and scarce, but that is not a problem since the dirt roads are used usually only by the locals who know them well.

On an apparent everyday evening a sign pointing to a nearby agritourism falls and a bus with a group of flamenco dancers, due to town for a recital, gets lost. They cannot find their way to the agritourism, which cancels their bookings when they see no one coming to claim them. The group has no chance but to stop at the Quarini residence to spend the night. As they stay there, Levante falls in love with lead dancer Caterina (Lorena Forteza), who unfortunately is stuck in a turbulent relationship with her boyfriend Alejandro (Alessio Caruso). At the same time, Selvaggia starts a dalliance with another dancer, Penelope (Natalia Estrada).

The group is forced to return to Spain when the tour is cancelled. During a farewell dinner in Florence, the evening is disrupted by Levante's date Carlina (Tosca D'Aquino), the town's herbalist, who gets drunk and embarrasses herself and Levante, as well as by a jealous Isabella (Benedetta Mazzini), Selvaggia's employer and on-and-off girlfriend. Back in the hotel, Caterina and Alejandro fight and break up, so Levante brings her on a nighttime walk across the city. They acknowledge their mutual attraction and kiss, but the morning after Caterina has to leave Italy, despite Levante's pleas.

One year later, Levante moves to Spain to be with Caterina. They have a son, who they name Gino, after Levante's grandfather, who died in the interim.

== Cast ==
- Leonardo Pieraccioni as Levante Quarini
- Lorena Forteza as Caterina
- Barbara Enrichi as Selvaggia Quarini
- Massimo Ceccherini as Libero Quarini
- Sergio Forconi as Osvaldo Quarini
- Tosca D'Aquino as Carlina
- Patrizia Corti as Franca Beniamini
- Benedetta Mazzini as Isabella
- Natalia Estrada as Penelope
- Paolo Hendel as Pippo
- Alessandro Haber as Naldone

== Release ==
The film opened 12 December 1996 in Italy on 75 screens and after it performed well, was expanded to 360 screens.

== Reception ==
Il Ciclone fared very well at the box office and was nominated for several awards, including seven David di Donatello, one of the most important Italian cinematic awards. The film won in the categories of "Audience Award", "Best Supporting Actress" (for Barbara Enrichi) and "Scholars Jury David". It was also nominated for "Best Film", "Best Screenplay", "Best Actor" (for Pieraccioni) and "Best Supporting Actor" (for Massimo Ceccherini), but lost it. The film was also nominated for four Ciak d'oro, winning two and losing two, and also won one "Globo Dorado" (for "Best Actor), one Hamptons International Film Festival Award (for "Most Popular Feature") and two Nastro d'Argento (for "Best Screenplay" and "Best Actor").

It grossed $442,283 in its opening weekend from 43 screens and placed fifth at the Italian box office. It went on to reach number one at the Italian box office and topped the charts for the first seven weeks of 1997. The film went on to become the highest-grossing Italian film of all-time with a gross of $44 million (78 billion lire nationally).
