= Padre Pio: Between Heaven and Earth =

2000 Italian television movie

- Written by: Franco Bernini
- Directed by: Giulio Base
- Starring: Michele Placido
- Composer: Ennio Morricone
- Country of origin: Italy
- Original language: Italian

Production
- Producer: Luca Bernabei
- Cinematography: Fabio Zamarion
- Editor: Carla Simoncelli
- Running time: 182 min.

Original release
- Network: Rai 1
- Release: 12 November – 13 November 2000

Padre Pio: Between Heaven and Earth (Italian: Padre Pio - Tra cielo e terra) is a 2000 Italian television movie directed by Giulio Base and starring Michele Placido in the title role. The film is based on real life events of Roman Catholic friar and later Saint, Padre Pio.

== Plot ==
Based on the historical records and the personal testimony of his fellow friars, this is the amazing true story of the life of the famous stigmatic monk, St. Padre Pio, a contemporary saint who died in 1968. Blessed with incredible spiritual gifts, including healing, bi-location, reading of souls and the stigmatic wounds, Padre Pio was a powerful witness for Christ, and a great spiritual guide to countless souls for over fifty years. Filmed on location in Italy, starring Michele Placido in a moving performance, this film tells the whole story of the beloved monk from San Giovanni Rotondo, a place where millions of pilgrims now go annually to visit Padre Pio's grave.

== Cast ==
- Michele Placido as Pio
- Barbora Bobulova as Emilia
- Fabio Camilli as Dr. Guglielmo Sanguinetti
- Rocco Papaleo as Friar Nicola
- Franco Trevisi as Father Elia
- Lucio Allocca as Father Agostino
- Francesco Dominedò as Father Antonio
- Marco Messeri as Father Benedetto
- Sydne Rome as Barbara Ward
- Riccardo Garrone as Eminency
- Mariano Rigillo as Father Gemelli
- Franco Interlenghi as Father Graziano
- Massimo Bellinzoni as Michele
- Francesca Gamba as Alida
- Luigi Diberti as Professor Bignami
- Pietro De Silva as Father Tommaso
- Giovanni Lombardo Radice as Pope Pius XII

== See also ==
- Padre Pio: Miracle Man (2000)
- Padre Pio (film) (2022)
