= Cheeky (film) =

2000 film by Tinto Brass

- Directed by: Tinto Brass
- Written by: Tinto Brass; Carla Cipriani; Nicolaj Pennestri; Silvia Rossi; Massimiliano Zanin
- Produced by: Massimo Ferrero
- Starring: Yuliya Mayarchuk; Jarno Berardi; Francesca Nunzi; Max Parodi; Mauro Lorenz
- Cinematography: Massimo Di Venanzo
- Music by: Pino Donaggio
- Distributed by: Cult Epics
- Release date: 28 January 2000
- Running time: 91 minutes
- Country: Italy
- Language: Italian
- Budget: $2,100,000

Cheeky (Italian: Tra(sgre)dire) is a 2000 sex comedy directed by Tinto Brass, with Yuliya Mayarchuk in the lead role. Certain parallelisms are drawn between Nerosubianco (1969), another Tinto Brass film set in London.

The Italian title is a play on the verbs trasgredire (to transgress) and tradire (to betray).

== Plot ==
In London, the beautiful Venetian Carla Burin (Yuliya Mayarchuk) is an intern at the front desk of a hotel. She is looking for an apartment to allow her boyfriend Matteo (Jarno Berardi) to join her there. The real estate agent, Moira (Francesca Nunzi), who is bisexual, rents her a loft with a view of the Thames, with "intimate conditions." When the hot-tempered, jealous Matteo finds a nude picture of Carla and letters from her French ex-lover Bernard (Mauro Lorenz), Carla and Matteo have a row on the telephone. Angry at Matteo, Carla sleeps with Moira. Matteo, desperate, comes to London, where he finds Moira naked in Carla's apartment. He confronts Carla about all her past infidelities and refuses her offer to perform fellatio on him before leaving. After a walk in the park, where he observes much sexual activity, he changes his mind. Carla shows up with a written account of her infidelities, but Matteo declares he no longer needs to know.

== Production ==
Yuliya Mayarchuk revealed that the two most difficult scenes for her were the one in which she has sex in a gondola (she had to put a fake penis inside her vagina and she started crying) and the infamous anal sex scene on a beach with Mauro Lorenz. "I didn't sleep the whole night before," Mayarchuk recalled.

== Reception ==
In a retrospective review, Sight & Sound described the film as a "corny soft-porn flick" and predominantly useful as "a chance to ogle plenty of pert bottoms, or 'windows to the soul' according to self-satisfied director Tinto Brass in the accompanying interview."
