= Tuttapposto =

- Theatrical release poster
- Directed by: Gianni Costantino
- Written by: Roberto Lipari; Paolo Pintacuda; Ignazio Rosato
- Produced by: Attilio De Razza
- Starring: Roberto Lipari
- Cinematography: Giuseppe Pignone
- Edited by: Claudio Di Mauro
- Music by: Giordano Maselli
- Production company: Medusa Film
- Distributed by: Medusa Film
- Release date: 3 October 2019
- Running time: 90 minutes
- Country: Italy
- Language: Italian

Tuttapposto (stylized as TuttAPPosto) is a 2019 Italian comedy film directed by Gianni Costantino.

== Cast ==
- Roberto Lipari as Roberto Lipari
- Luca Zingaretti as Ruggero Lipari
- Monica Guerritore as Minister Beccaria
- Simona Di Bella as Sonia
- Viktoriya Pisotska as Irina
- Carlo Calderone as Elio
- Francesco Russo as Pietro
- Maurizio Marchetti as Domenico Lipari
- Ninni Bruschetta as Giovanni Mancuso
- Paolo Sassanelli as Luigi Castellino
- Silvana Fallisi as Luisella Lipari
- Gino Astorina as Matteo Lo Cicero
- Sergio Friscia as Nuccio
- Maurizio Bologna as Salvatore Mancuso
- Angela Di Mauro as Agata Mancuso
- Barbara Gallo as Santina Riccobono
