= The Adventures of Pinocchio (1972 miniseries) =

- Based on: The Adventures of Pinocchio by Carlo Collodi
- Written by: Luigi Comencini; Suso Cecchi D'Amico (from Carlo Collodi)
- Directed by: Luigi Comencini
- Starring: Andrea Balestri; Nino Manfredi; Gina Lollobrigida; Vittorio De Sica
- Theme music composer: Fiorenzo Carpi
- Country of origin: Italy
- Original language: Italian
- No. of episodes: 6

Production
- Producer: Franco Cristaldi
- Cinematography: Armando Nannuzzi
- Editor: Nino Baragli
- Running time: 280 min (original TV edition); 320 min (extended TV edition); 135 min (theatrical edition)

Original release
- Network: Rai 1
- Release: 8 April – 6 May 1972

The Adventures of Pinocchio (Italian: Le avventure di Pinocchio) is a 1972 Italian five-part miniseries directed by Luigi Comencini, which originally aired weekly on Rai 1 between April 8 and May 6, 1972. Based on Carlo Collodi's 1883 novel with the same name, the miniseries received a large critical success, and had an average of twenty-one and a half million viewers during its first airing. All the episodes together make up 280 minutes of runtime.

An extended cut of the series, totaling 320 minutes of runtime divided into six episodes, first aired in France on Première chaîne de l'ORTF between December 19 and December 31, 1972. Also, a 135-minute edit of the miniseries was released as a theatrical film in Italy on December 21, 1972, and later released in other countries.

== Plot ==
=== First episode ===
In a small 19th century mountain village in Tuscany, the caravan of the famous puppeteer Mangiafuoco arrives for its spring tour in the region; his two musicians, the Fox and the Cat, are tasked with heralding his arrival. A promotional poster inspires the widowed and financially struggling carpenter Geppetto to create a puppet for himself and make his own living as a traveling puppeteer. His more well-off neighbor Mastro Ciliegia encounters a log that speaks and complains, and rids himself of it when Geppetto requests a log to make his puppet. During the transaction, the log causes discord between the two by striking Geppetto and setting Ciliegia up to be blamed.

Geppetto spends the evening carving his puppet, which he names Pinocchio in honor of a friend. When Geppetto notices the log's sentience, he blames it on hunger and continues working, believing he can imagine himself interacting with the puppet, even talking to the painting of his late wife. During the night the spirit of the woman appears, reincarnated as a turquoise-haired Fairy. As Geppetto sleeps, the Fairy offers Pinocchio a precise pact: that of making him a temporary child if he behaves correctly, otherwise he would become wooden again, until he has demonstrated his goodness in order to be a child forever.

The next morning Geppetto is shocking to find his puppet a real boy, but then Pinocchio runs off with Geppetto in pursuit. He steals food from a fisherman but two Carabinieri catch him. Geppetto's attempt to explain the situation leads the policemen to consider him insane and unfit to raise a child. They arrest Geppetto and entrust Pinocchio to a washerwoman, but Pinocchio leaves for home during a rainfall. Finding no food at home, Pinocchio begs to his neighbors, but one of them believes the act to be a prank and dumps water on him.

=== Second episode ===
Pinocchio goes home and finds the Talking Cricket, who tells him to be good. But Pinocchio just throws a hammer at him, smashing a picture of Geppetto's wife. Pinocchio puts his feet in the fire and turns back into a puppet.

Geppetto is released from prison and returns to see Pinocchio has burned off his feet, but Pinocchio weeps so much that the Fairy turns him back into a real boy. Pinocchio now decides to try being good and go to school but he will need a school book, Geppetto decides to sell his coat to buy Pinocchio a primer. On his way to the schoolhouse, Pinocchio is distracted by the music from Mangiafuoco's caravan and decides to see the show, selling his primer for a ticket. He is brought on stage by the marionettes of the company and turns back into a wooden puppet, but Mangiafuoco takes Pinocchio.

Geppetto and Mastro Ciliegia go to the schoolhouse to greet Pinocchio, but find he is not there. While Ciliegia consoles Geppetto, he notices that a child has Pinocchio's primer and discovers that it was bought by the child's father from Pinocchio to watch the show. Mangiafuoco's company has now traveled out of the village and has spotted for the night. Mangiafuoco's mutton is cold so he tells the Fox & Cat to go grab Pinocchio. But the Fairy turns Pinocchio back into a boy. Mangiafuoco thinking the Fox and Cat have robbed him chases them away.

Pinocchio admits to Mangiafuoco that he was the puppet who disrupted the last spectacle and tells his story. But Mangiafuoco's mutton is still cold and wants to burn his Marionette Harlequin, but Pinocchio says that if anyone should be burned it should be he. The Master is so heartfelt he sneezes (which happens every time he gets emotional) and decides to eat his mutton raw.

=== Third episode ===
Mangiafuoco decides to give Pinocchio six gold coins to help Geppetto out. The next morning, Pinocchio sets out and runs into two the Fox and Cat, now pretending to be Lame and Blind. Pinocchio revealed to the two his gold, but a Hen warns Pinocchio not to trust strangers, but the Cat jumps upon it and twists its neck. The farmer seeing this chases after them and the Fox & Cat then loses Pinocchio. The three later meet up at the Gambero Rosso tavern and have a feast with Pinocchio using one of Pinocchio's coins.

Pinocchio falls asleep at the table and when he walks up finds that the Fox & Cat have left. Pinocchios heads out into the woods but is attacked by the Fox and Cat dressed as robbers, who chases Pinocchio until dawn. Pinocchio then finds a house floating on a lake and runs to it, the house belongs to the Fairy, she tells Pinocchio she is dead and then robbers catch Pinocchio and hang him by his neck from a tree. To save him the Fairy changes Pinocchio into a wooden puppet and when the noose breaks Pinocchio runs into the Fairy's House.

The Fairy summons two doctors to see if Pinocchio should stay a Puppet or turn back into a boy, the Doctors have conflicting options. The Fairy then asks about Pinocchio's coins, Pinocchio lies to the Fairy and his nose begins to grow. The Fairy's maid Snail then rushes in to mock Pinocchio, he then cries and apologizes to his Fairy and is turned back into a boy. Pinocchio then tells the truth about his coins,(that he had hidden them in a well when he was chased by the Robbers) and sets out to get them. But he runs into the Fox & Cat once more, who tell Pinocchio about a magical field where if Pinocchio buries his coins, a wonderful tree full of coins will grow. Pinocchio believes this lie and buries his coins, but when Pinocchio heads out to get water, the Fox and Cat steal the money and run off.

=== Fourth episode ===
When Pinocchio finds out he was robbed he rushes to a local judge but is put in prison for stupidity. When Pinocchio is let out he rushes back to the Fairy's house only to find a grave, he asks a passing man to read what the grave says and finds out it belongs to his dear Fairy. Pinocchio cries at the grave until he becomes hungry. He goes to a nearby farmer and reaches for some grapes but gets his foot stuck in a Foothold trap. The Farmer makes Pinocchio work as his Guard dog, as his last dog (Melampo) had died. Pinocchio is later set free when he catches the thieves who have been stealing the Farmer's chickens, the Farmer also tells Pinocchio that Geppetto has set out for sea. Geppetto has indeed set out for sea to go to the Americas in search of his son. Pinocchio follows the river down to the docks, where he sees his father out at sea, Geppetto'a boat flips over and Pinocchio dives in to save him.

Pinocchio wakes up on a beach, Pinocchio cries thinking his father is gone for good. Under a wrecked rowboat, Pinocchio finds Lucignolo, a lazy good for nothing kid. Pinocchio learns Lucignolo is a runaway from home and together the two of them get into some trouble.

=== Fifth episode ===
The next morning, Lucignolo abandons Pinocchio. Pinocchio now hungry searches a nearby town for food, and everyone in the town offers work in exchange for food, Pinocchio being the lazy child he is refuses. But then Pinocchio finds a Breadline and the one serving food is Pinocchio's good Fairy. The Fairy makes Pinocchio slave for her before she takes him home and finally then recognizes him as her dear little puppet. The Fairy gives Pinocchio a deal, he goes to school and stays good and she'll find Geppetto for him.

Pinocchio starts school and soon becomes the top student in the class. Pinocchio becomes so good that the Fairy is going to throw a big party for Pinocchio. But that day at school Lucignolo is reintroduced into the class, but causes a distraction and gets kicked out, Pinocchio soon also causes a distraction to follow his friend. The two escape the school ground and Pinocchio asks where Lucignolo is going in such a hurry, he says he is going to The Land of Toys, a place that has no schools and no teachers, and all they do is play all day. Lucignolo invites Pinocchio but he declines, Pinocchio rushes back to the Fairy's house but it's now dark. Pinocchio knocks at the door but only the Snail is awake and very slowly comes down to open the door. When Pinocchio goes to eat his dinner he finds out it's all porcelain, Pinocchio is so angry that he runs off to join Lucignolo. He reaches the coach and joins Lucignolo upon the donkeys pulling the coach. Once the two and the other kids reach the Land of Toys they all enjoy themselves.

=== Sixth episode ===
Lucignolo and Pinocchio wake up with donkey ears, the two try to escape but are turned into donkeys with the rest of the kids. Pinocchio is sold to a Circus and during one of his performances he sees his Fairy in a box seat, he rushes up to her and when pulled by the Ringmaster he falls down and twists his leg. The Ringmaster sells Pinocchio to a Drum Manufacturer who brings the donkey down to the seashore ties a rock to his leg and kicks the rock in, dragging the donkey down to drown. But when the Drum Manufacturer pulls the rope he finds Pinocchio in his puppet form instead of a donkey. And in a range of anger, the Drum Manufacturer throws Pinocchio back into the sea.

Pinocchio swims away and out of the waves comes a giant whale. The whale seeing the puppet swallows Pinocchio up. In the throat of the whale, Pinocchio meets a tuna fish who tells Pinocchio to quit screaming and let himself be digested, Pinocchio is washed forward by a wave into the belly and finds Geppetto. Pinocchio learns that Geppetto had been swallowed up by the whale when he flipped over in his raft, a ship was also swallowed and the ship was full of boxes of supplies that Geppetto has been living off happily. That night Geppetto goes to wake up Pinocchio in his puppet form, but then he sees the puppet form before his feet of Pinocchio as a boy. The two rejoice in the belly and Pinocchio asks when they will be leaving, Geppettos wants to stay because he thinks they are living in comfort.

That night Geppetto follows Pinocchio to the mouth of the whale, and Pinocchio tells Geppetto that the tuna fish has escaped. The two decide to escape by riding on the back of the tuna. By morning they reach shore and the series ends as the two run off to a distant house to ask for food and shelter.

== Cast ==
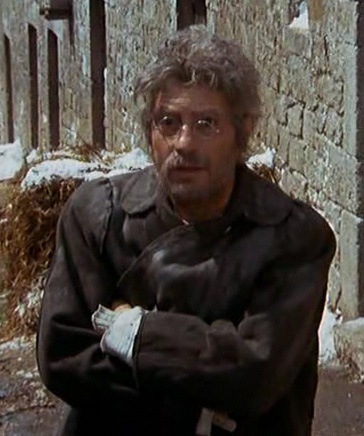
Nino Manfredi as Geppetto

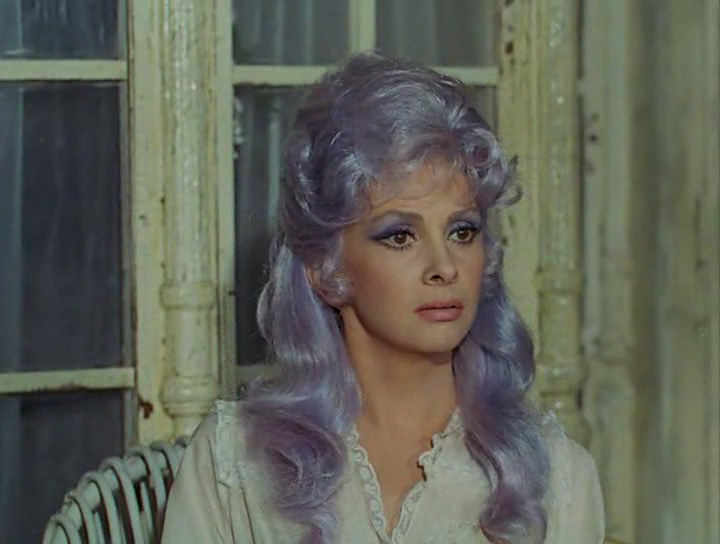
Gina Lollobrigida as The Fairy with Turquoise Hair

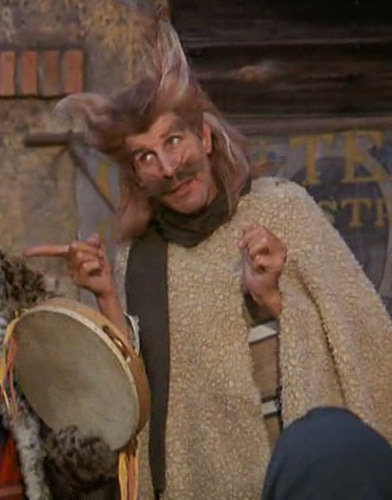
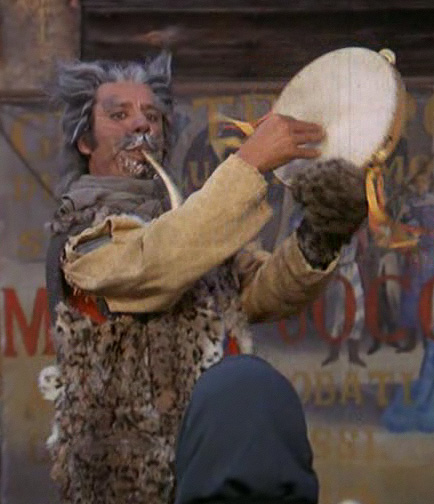
Ciccio Ingrassia as the Fox and Franco Franchi as the Cat
- Andrea Balestri: Pinocchio
- Nino Manfredi: Geppetto
- Gina Lollobrigida: The Fairy with Turquoise Hair
- Franco Franchi: Cat
- Ciccio Ingrassia: Fox
- Lionel Stander (dubbed by Antonio Guidi): Mangiafuoco
- Domenico Santoro: Lucignolo
- Vittorio De Sica: The Judge
- Ugo D'Alessio (dubbed by Riccardo Billi): Mastro Ciliegia
- Orazio Orlando: The Marshal
- Bruno Bassi : Theodore
- Mario Adorf: The Ringmaster
- Mario Scaccia: First doctor
- Jacques Herlin (dubbed by Stefano Satta Flores): Second doctor
- Carlo Bagno (dubbed by Antonio Guidi): Melampo's owner
- Riccardo Billi: The Coachman
- Enzo Cannavale: The Innkeeper
- Zoe Incrocci: The Snail Maid
- Nerina Montagnani: The Marten
- Renzo Montagnani: Tuna (voice)
- Mario Ercolani: Farmer
- Carmine Torre: River Fisherman
- Piero Gentili: First Carabinieri
- Mimmo Olivieri: Second Carabinieri
- Paola Natale: Laundress
- Mario Narcisi: Janitor
- Vera Drudi: Female Puppeteer
- Orlando D'Ubaldo: Ragpicker
- Fredo Pistoni: Fisherman
- Antonio Danesi: Mangiafuoco's Coachman
- Christmas Siddi: Female Beggar
- Simone Santo: Hen (voice)
- Enzo Cannavale: Waiter
- Furio Meniconi: Farmer
- Giuseppe Caffarelli: Carabiniere
- Caliano Sbarra: Pinocchio's Cellmate
- Pino Ferrara: Fisherman
- Clara Colosimo: Emporium Mistress
- Luciano De Ritis: Truant Officer
- Syria Betti: Lucignolo's Mother
- Nazzareno Caldarelli: Donut Maker
- Ferdinando Murolo: Mason
- Luigi Leoni: The Teacher
- Pietro Fuselli: The School's Director
- Mario Colombaioni: Donkey Buyer
- Walter Richter: Drum Manufacturer
- Walter Buschhoff: Salumiere
- Günther Stoll: 1st Fisherman
- Fred Williams: 2nd Fisherman
- Willy Semmelrogge: 3rd Fisherman
