= Dear Goddamned Friends =

1994 film

Dear Goddamned Friends (Cari fottutissimi amici)
- Film poster
- Directed by: Mario Monicelli
- Written by: Leo Benvenuti, Mario Monicelli, Piero De Bernardi, Suso Cecchi D'Amico
- Produced by: Mario Cecchi Gori, Vittorio Cecchi Gori
- Starring: Paolo Villaggio, Massimo Ceccherini, Paolo Hendel
- Cinematography: Tonino Nardi
- Edited by: Ruggero Mastroianni
- Music by: Renzo Arbore
- Distributed by: Variety Distribution
- Release date: February 1994
- Running time: 118 minutes
- Country: Italy
- Language: Italian

Dear Goddamned Friends (Italian: Cari fottutissimi amici) is a 1994 Italian comedy film directed by Mario Monicelli. It was entered into the 44th Berlin International Film Festival where it won an Honourable Mention.

== Plot ==
In 1944 in Tuscany, a group of boxers facing the disasters of the Second World War, during the intrusive presence of the Germans and the Americans, organizes rigged matches to make some money and travel from town to town, hoping to participate in local fairs. A young black American soldier, believed missing, and a girl who refused to marry accompany the ramshackle group.

== Cast ==
- Paolo Villaggio as Dieci
- Massimo Ceccherini as Marlini
- Vittorio Rap as Callicchero
- Marco Graziani as Calamai
- Giuseppe Oppedisano as Taddei
- Elijah Raynard Childs as Washington
- Béatrice Macola as Testa di rapa
- Antonella Ponziani as Wilma
- Stefano Davanzati as Drago
- Paolo Hendel as Rag. Fortini
- Novello Novelli as Zingaro
- Eva Grimaldi as Topona
- Sergio Pierattini as the Poet
