= Barbara Tabita =

Italian actress, comedian and playwright

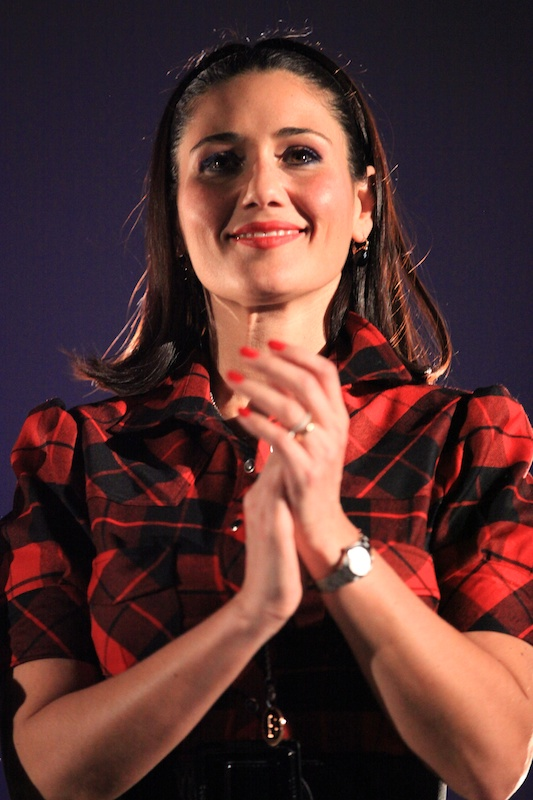
- Born: 13 February 1975 (age 50); Augusta, Sicily, Italy
- Occupation: Actress

Barbara Tabita (born 13 February 1975) is an Italian actress, comedian, and playwright.

== Life and career ==
Born in Augusta, Sicily, Tabita studied acting at the drama school of the Teatro Stabile di Catania. She made her film debut in 2000, in the comedy film Come se fosse amore. Her varied career includes films, TV-series, stage plays, musicals, and television programs.

== Filmography ==
=== Films ===
Year	Title	Role(s)	Notes
2002	Come se fosse amore	Romana	
2003	Ho visto le stelle!	Camilla	
2004	Sara May	Dora	
2005	I Love You in Every Language in the World	Debora	
2007	Il 7 e l'8	Marcella	
2009	Io & Marilyn	Ramona	
2010	Natale in Sudafrica	Susanna Boffa	
2013	The Mafia Kills Only in Summer	Arturo's mother	
2014	Italo	Luisa Nigro	
2015	Ci devo pensare	Alessia	
2015	Italiano medio	Sharon Pacchianotti	
2015	Nomi e cognomi	Carla	
2015	Matrimonio al sud	Anna Caprioli	
2015	Belli di papà	Anna	
2016	Lo scambio	Inspector's wife	
2016	Un Natale al Sud	Celeste	
2018	La fuitina sbagliata	Enza Vitrano	

=== Television ===
Year	Title	Role(s)	Notes
2001	La piovra	Journalist #1	2 episodes
2006	Inspector Montalbano	Mrs. Tarantino	Episode: "Il gioco delle tre carte"
2008	Agrodolce	Gemma	Recurring role; 25 episodes
2008–2009	La nuova squadra	Mimma Ferrante	Recurring role; 20 episodes
2010	I Cesaroni	Olga Di Stefano	Main role (season 4); 20 episodes
2014	Fuoriclasse	Iris	Recurring role; 6 episodes
2016	Felicia Impastato	Franca	Television film
2016	Mariottide	Mirella	Main role; 20 episodes
2022	The Bad Guy	Priscilla Sauro	2 episodes
