= Massimo Ceccherini =

Italian actor, film director and comedian

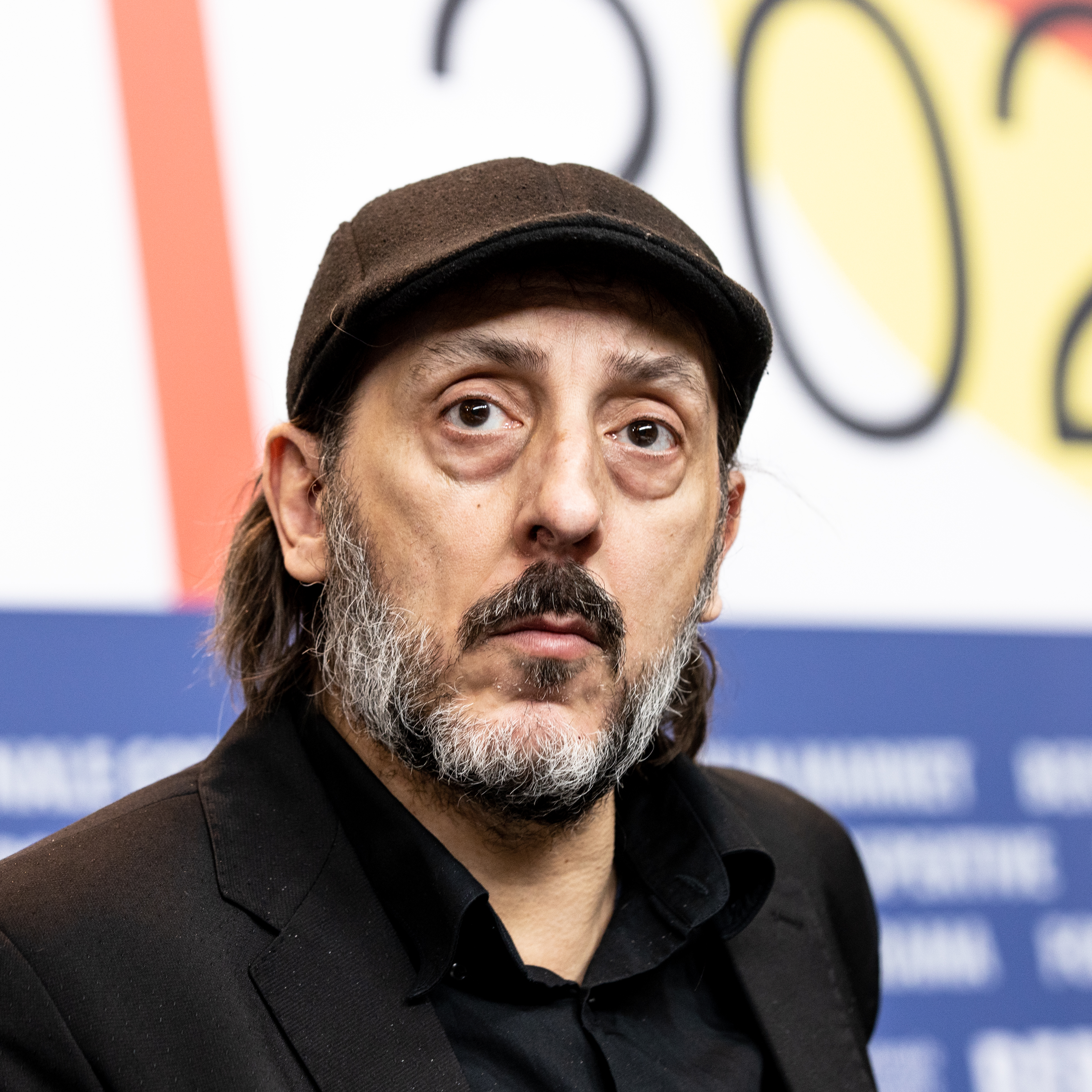
- Ceccherini in 2020
- Born: 23 May 1965 (age 61); Florence, Italy
- Years active: 1990–present
- Height: 1.82 m (6 ft 0 in)

Massimo Ceccherini (born 23 May 1965) is an Italian actor, film director, comedian and screenwriter.

== Biography ==
Born in Florence, Ceccherini is the son of a plasterer, he seemed destined for the same profession, but his father was attracted to the world of entertainment. Ceccherini made his first television appearance in the program La Corrida and for years pursued a musical career with his friend Alessandro Paci. He became known to television viewers in the cabaret show Videomusic, Aria Fresca, conducted by a young Carlo Conti. In the meantime he got his first part in a film, Welcome to Home Gori directed by Alessandro Benvenuti, with whom the following year he would also act in the film The Party's Over. In 1994, alongside Paolo Villaggio, Ceccherini appeared in Dear Goddamned Friends, directed by Mario Monicelli. Popular success, however, came with the collaboration with his friend Leonardo Pieraccioni, participating in almost all his films. He and Pieraccioni were reunited in 2025, when Ceccherini played a father whose son wants to play rock music instead of studying, and Pieraccioni played the priest who tries to perform an exorcism on the boy, in Lucio Corsi's hit music video "Volevo essere un duro."

== Filmography ==
=== Film ===
- Welcome to Home Gori (1990) – Danilo
- The Party's Over (1991) – Kinder
- Amami (1993) – Fan di Anna
- Bonus malus (1993)
- S.P.Q.R.: 2,000 and a Half Years Ago (1994) – Cliente di Prato
- Dear Goddamned Friends (1994) – Marlini
- The Graduates (1995) – Pino
- Albergo Roma (1996)
- Return to Home Gori (1996) – Danilo
- The Cyclone (1996) – Libero Quarini
- Five Stormy Days (1997)
- Fireworks (1997) – Germano Reali
- Viola Kisses Everybody (1998) – Max
- Lucignolo (1999) – Lucio
- Picasso's Face (2000) – Ceccherini
- Freewheeling (2000) – Aunt Natalizia
- The Prince and the Pirate (2001) – Melchiorre "Gimondi"
- My Life with Stars and Stripes (2003) – Lando
- Suddenly Paradise (2003) – Passante
- La brutta copia (2004) – Fernando Petriccioli / Leandro Fandechi
- Tutti all'attacco (2005) – Max Bernabei
- I Love You in Every Language in the World (2005) – Padre Massimo
- Napoleon and Me (2006) – Cosimo Bartolini
- Nemici per la pelle (2006)
- 2061: An Exceptional Year (2007) – Cosimetto Delli Cecchi
- A Beautiful Wife (2007) – Baccano
- Un'estate al mare (2008) – Cecco
- Cenci in Cina (2009) – Furio
- Me and Marilyn (2009) – Massimo
- A Natale mi sposo (2010) – Cecco
- Una cella in due (2011) –Manolo
- Amici miei – Come tutto ebbe inizio (2011) – Alderighi
- Wedding in Paris (2011) – Leonardo
- Napoletans (2011) – Pino
- Finalmente la felicità (2011) – Paziente
- Operazione vacanze (2012) – Spino
- La mia mamma suona il rock (2013) – Massimo
- Regalo a sorpresa (2013) – Marco
- Una vita da sogno (2013) – Cekke Lin
- Sarebbe stato facile (2013)
- Un fantastico via vai (2013) – il padre di Anna
- Tale of Tales (2015) – Father Circus Performer
- Il professor Cenerentolo (2015) – Tinto
- La coppia dei campioni (2016) – Pappone
- Ciao Brother (2016) – Taxi driver
- Gli infamia - Episodi di vita quotidiana (2016)
- Smile Factor (2017) – Massimo
- Non ci resta che ridere (2019)
- Pinocchio (2019) – The Fox
- Il sesso degli angeli (2022)
- Everyone on Board (2022)
- The Hummingbird (2022)
- Pare parecchio Parigi (2024)
- Un weekend artificiale (2026)

== Theatre ==
- Fermi tutti questo è uno spettacolo, Pinocchio (1998)
- Quei bravi racazzi (2006–2007)
- Pinocchio (2009)
