= Suzie Kennedy =

English actress

- Born: 29 January 1977 (age 49); London, England
- Occupations: Look-alike; comedian; singer; actress
- Years active: 2000–present
- Website: Official website

Suzie Kennedy (born 29 January 1977) is an English comedian, singer and actress who holds both British and American citizenship. She is best known for her work as a Marilyn Monroe lookalike and impersonator.

== Career ==
Kennedy has impersonated Monroe in several television commercials for Pepsi, Citroën, Guinness, Iberia Airlines, and others. She also played Monroe in the 2003 Revealed episode "Who Killed Marilyn Monroe?" and Monroe's 2014 episode of Autopsy, as well as films such as Me and Marilyn (2009), JFK: Seven Days That Made a President (2013), The Theory of Everything (2014), Blade Runner 2049 (2017), and Maria (2024).

She has appeared as herself on television series such as The Alan Titchmarsh Show, The Weakest Link, Come Dine with Me, Party Wars, Pet Nation, and The Chase.

In 2020, she played Cheri in a revival of the play Women Behind Bars at the Montalbán Theatre in Los Angeles. In that same year, she appeared impersonating Marilyn Monroe on Britain's Got Talent, singing "I Wanna Be Loved by You", a song sung by Marilyn in Some Like It Hot (1959).

In 2021, she impersonated Marilyn Monroe again in a commercial for Appenzeller Käse a cheese brand from Switzerland.

== Personal life ==
Kennedy is a Christian. In May 2022, after Kim Kardashian wore Marilyn Monroe's iconic silk gown at the 2022 Met Gala in New York City (the dress that was worn by Monroe at Madison Square Garden on May 19, 1962, when she sang "Happy Birthday, Mr. President" to John F. Kennedy), Kennedy criticised Kardashian's behaviour and stated in an interview with Sky News Australia: "Marilyn Monroe had a moment in history and Kim Kardashian has clung on to that…she’s not an actress, she’s a reality star and I think it’s a very sad day for that dress – it’s tarnished now...Kim could have made her moment but instead she had to steal it from Marilyn – that’s sad."

== See also ==
- Marilyn Monroe in popular culture
