= Un'estate al mare =

- Directed by: Carlo Vanzina; Enrico Vanzina
- Written by: Carlo Vanzina; Enrico Vanzina
- Starring: Massimo Ceccherini; Alessandro Paci; Lino Banfi; Enrico Brignano; Nancy Brilli; Ezio Greggio; Enzo Salvi; Biagio Izzo; Alena Seredova; Maurizio Mattioli
- Cinematography: Claudio Zamarion
- Edited by: Raimondo Crociani
- Music by: Manuel De Sica; Luigi Mas
- Distributed by: Medusa Film
- Release date: 27 June 2008
- Running time: 110 minutes
- Country: Italy
- Language: Italian

Un'estate al mare is a 2008 Italian comedy film directed by Carlo Vanzina and Enrico Vanzina.

== Plot ==
The film tells the story of a group of people during the summer: football fans, loving couples, single fathers, beautiful women and businessmen, emigrants who return to their country and great dramatic actors forced into comic situations etc.
