= Quelli della speciale =

1993 Italian television series

- Country of origin: Italy
- No. of seasons: 1
- No. of episodes: 12

Original release
- Network: Italia 1
- Release: 1993

Quelli della speciale is an Italian television series.

== See also ==
- List of Italian television series
