= Dr. M (film) =

- French theatrical release poster
- Directed by: Claude Chabrol
- Screenplay by: Claude Chabrol; Sollace Mitchell
- Story by: Thomas Bauermeister
- Based on: Doctor Mabuse der Spieler by Norbert Jacques
- Produced by: Hans Brockmann; François Duplat; Christoph Holch
- Starring: Alan Bates; Jennifer Beals; Jan Niklas
- Cinematography: Jean Rabier
- Edited by: Monique Fardoulis
- Music by: Mekong Delta; Paul Hindemith
- Production companies: N.E.F. Filmproduktion und Vertriebs; Ellepi Films; Italian International Film; Cléa Productions; Solyfic; ZDF; Telefilm Saar GmbH; La Sept
- Distributed by: Pyramide Distribution
- Release date: 24 May 1990
- Running time: 111 minutes
- Countries: West Germany; France; Italy
- Language: English

Dr. M. is a 1990 crime film co-written and directed by Claude Chabrol. The film is loosely based on the plot of Fritz Lang's Dr. Mabuse the Gambler, which was in turn based on Mabuse der Spieler by Norbert Jacques.

== Plot ==
In 1999, Berlin is struck by a mysterious wave of suicides. While some individuals take their own lives in isolation, others die in ways that cause multiple casualties, creating widespread panic on both sides of the Berlin Wall.

Lieutenant Claus Hartman, a West Berlin police officer, becomes personally invested in the case after recalling that his wife took her own life years earlier, shortly after discovering she was pregnant. Hartman begins to suspect that the suicides are not random acts of despair but are instead linked to the work of Dr. Marsfeldt, a scientist believed to be experimenting with mass hypnosis.

As Hartman investigates, he discovers that Marsfeldt is using the image of a young woman to manipulate the public and trigger self-destructive behavior. Hartman's search for the truth draws him deeper into the conspiracy, forcing him to confront both the psychological manipulation spreading across Berlin and his own personal grief.

== Cast ==
Actor	Role
Alan Bates	Dr. Marsfeldt / Guru
Jennifer Beals	Sonja Vogler
Jan Niklas	Lt. Claus Hartman
Andrew McCarthy	The Assassin
Hanns Zischler	Moser
Benoît Régent	Stieglitz
Alexander Radszun	Engler
Daniela Poggi	Kathi
William Berger	Penck
Michael Degen	Reimar von Geldern
Wolfgang Preiss	Kessler
Jean Benguigui	Rolf
Isolde Barth	Mrs. Sehr
Béatrice Macola	Anna

== Critical reception ==
Steve Simels of Entertainment Weekly gave the film a C−:

[T]his is a standard-grade, low-budget European B movie. The plotting is absurd (with anachronistic elements; though the film is set in the future, the Berlin Wall has not yet come down); the stars — including the still fetching Jennifer Beals and the usually cool Alan Bates (doing what seems like an eccentric imitation of Albert Finney doing Hercule Poirot) — either overact or sleepwalk; and the pacing is lethargic verging on comatose.

Jackson Adler of TV Guide gave the film 3 out of 4 stars:

Club Extinction is something of a mishmash. But it's a mostly engaging mishmash with Chabrol operating in a satirically sinister mode that should come as no surprise to his devotees... In contrast to many American genre pictures, the problems with Club Extinction stem from aiming too high rather than too low... [M]ostly to Chabrol's credit, the going never gets boring, no matter how many times one views it. Club Extinction is an absorbing and even amusing thriller with brains--even if it does take more brains than should be necessary to follow its helter-skelter plot.

== Release ==
Dr. M was first released in West Germany on 24 May 1990, marking its theatrical premiere. The film was later shown on German television through ZDF on 31 January 1993. In international markets, the film appeared under different titles; in the United States, it was released on home video as Club Extinction. Over time, it has been distributed on various television networks and in home media formats, making it accessible to audiences outside of its original theatrical run.

=== Home media ===
The film was released in the United States as Club Extinction on VHS.

== See also ==
- Dr. Mabuse the Gambler
