= Il professor Cenerentolo =

2015 Italian comedy film

- Film poster
- Directed by: Leonardo Pieraccioni
- Written by: Leonardo Pieraccioni; Giovanni Veronesi; Domenico Costanzo
- Produced by: Marco Belardi
- Starring: Leonardo Pieraccioni; Laura Chiatti
- Cinematography: Fabrizio Lucci
- Edited by: Patrizio Marone
- Music by: Gianluca Sibaldi
- Distributed by: 01 Distribution
- Release date: 7 December 2015
- Running time: 89 minutes
- Country: Italy
- Language: Italian

Il professor Cenerentolo (lit. 'Professor Cinderella') is a 2015 Italian comedy film written, directed and performed by Leonardo Pieraccioni. The scenes of the film were shot in Lazio, between Rome, Formia, Gaeta and Ventotene. It was Pieraccioni's first film not being set in his homeland of Tuscany. The cast also includes Laura Chiatti, Massimo Ceccherini and Flavio Insinna.

== Plot ==
Umberto Massaciuccoli is an engineer who attempted a bank robbery to avoid the bankruptcy of his business; the robbery, however, fails miserably and Umberto is thus arrested and sentenced to a period of detention in the Ventotene prison. When his term approaches the end, the man is given permission to work part-time outside the penitentiary. He is employed in a library and also tutors the prison director's daughter, who should soon graduate.

One evening, during a socio-cultural event open to the public, Umberto meets Morgana, a fascinating dance teacher. Umberto's nickname "professor" among the other inmates makes the girl believe that he is there as an educator, not a prisoner. Taking advantage of the misunderstanding, Umberto begins to date her during the time actually assigned for his job in the library. He must always return to jail by midnight though.

One day Morgana discovers the truth and breaks off from the dishonest Umberto. Thanks to the help and complicity of various friends and companions, he manages to restore the relationship, by recovering in particular a gold necklace handed down for generations within her family as an heirloom, which a previous and violent ex boyfriend had stolen and sold. Morgana, reflecting on Umberto's questions about the love of a daughter for her father, decides to gift part of the jewel to Umberto's daughter Martina, leaving the latter in the dark about her. Some time later Umberto, Morgana and Arnaldo, owner of the municipal library where Umberto had been employed, start a business that deals with recovering missing objects, thanks to Arnaldo's dwarfism and ability to dig within small crevices.

== Cast ==
- Leonardo Pieraccioni as Umberto Massaciuccoli
- Laura Chiatti as Morgana
- Massimo Ceccherini as Tinto
- Flavio Insinna as the prison director
- Davide Marotta as Arnaldo
- Lisa Ruth Andreozzi as Martina
- Sergio Friscia as Don Vincenzo
- Nicola Nocella as officer Nocella
- Nicola Acunzo as Calabrese
- Lorena Cesarini as Sveva
- Manuela Zero as Mia
- Emanuela Aurizi as the spouse
- Lucianna De Falco as Signora Mammolotti

== Release ==
The film was released in cinemas starting from 7 December 2015, distributed by 01 Distribution in collaboration with Rai Cinema.

== Reception ==
=== Receipts ===
The film on its debut weekend grossed over 1,250,000 euros, placing itself in 1st place in the Italian box office, surpassing even Chiamatemi Francesco. After a week, as of 15 December 2015 the film held the top spot reaching a total of €2,975,950. With the arrival in the theaters of Star Wars: The Force Awakens the movie dropped to second position, and then dropped to sixth position at the end of December, behind Natale col Boss and Vacanze ai Caraibi. As of 6 January 2016 the film has grossed 5,889,119 euro, ranking in third place of the most viewed Italian films of the holidays.
