= Lucignolo =

- Directed by: Massimo Ceccherini
- Written by: Massimo Ceccherini; Giovanni Veronesi
- Starring: Massimo Ceccherini; Alessandro Paci; Claudia Gerini; Tinto Brass; Flavio Bucci
- Edited by: Massimo Ceccherini; Giovanni Veronesi
- Release date: 1999
- Running time: 90 minutes
- Country: Italy
- Language: Italian

Lucignolo is a 1999 Italian movie directed by and starring Massimo Ceccherini, with Alessandro Paci and Claudia Gerini.

== Plot ==
Lucio (Massimo Ceccherini) is an unemployed thirty-year-old red-haired guy who's extremely lazy and doesn't wake up until three o'clock in the afternoon; he treats his parents very poorly and always hang out at the nearest bar, especially with his best friend Pino (Alessandro Paci), who's also unemployed and equally weird (his clothes are all the same color of his sofa's cover). One day, as Lucio's sister leaves for the US, he's convinced by their parents to substitute her at the private hospital where she used to work, which is directed by the charming Fatima Turchini.
