= Giorgio Ariani =

Italian stand-up comedian and actor

- Born: 26 May 1941; Ferrara, Italy
- Died: 5 March 2016 (aged 74); Empoli, Italy
- Occupation(s): Comedian, actor

Giorgio Ariani (26 May 1941 – 5 March 2016) was an Italian stand-up comedian, actor and voice actor.

== Life and career ==
Born in Ferrara, Ariani grew up in Florence and started his career as a comedian in regional cabaret clubs. He became first known thanks to the participation to several RAI variety shows such as Supersera and Ci pensiamo lunedì. He was also active in films, particularly in the early 1980s.

In March 2019, L'affarista was released in which Ariani played the character named Ugo Ferretti.

In his late years Ariani directed a drama school in Campi Bisenzio. He died, aged 74, after a long illness. He was married and had three children.
