= Leonardo Pieraccioni =

Italian actor and film director (born 1965)

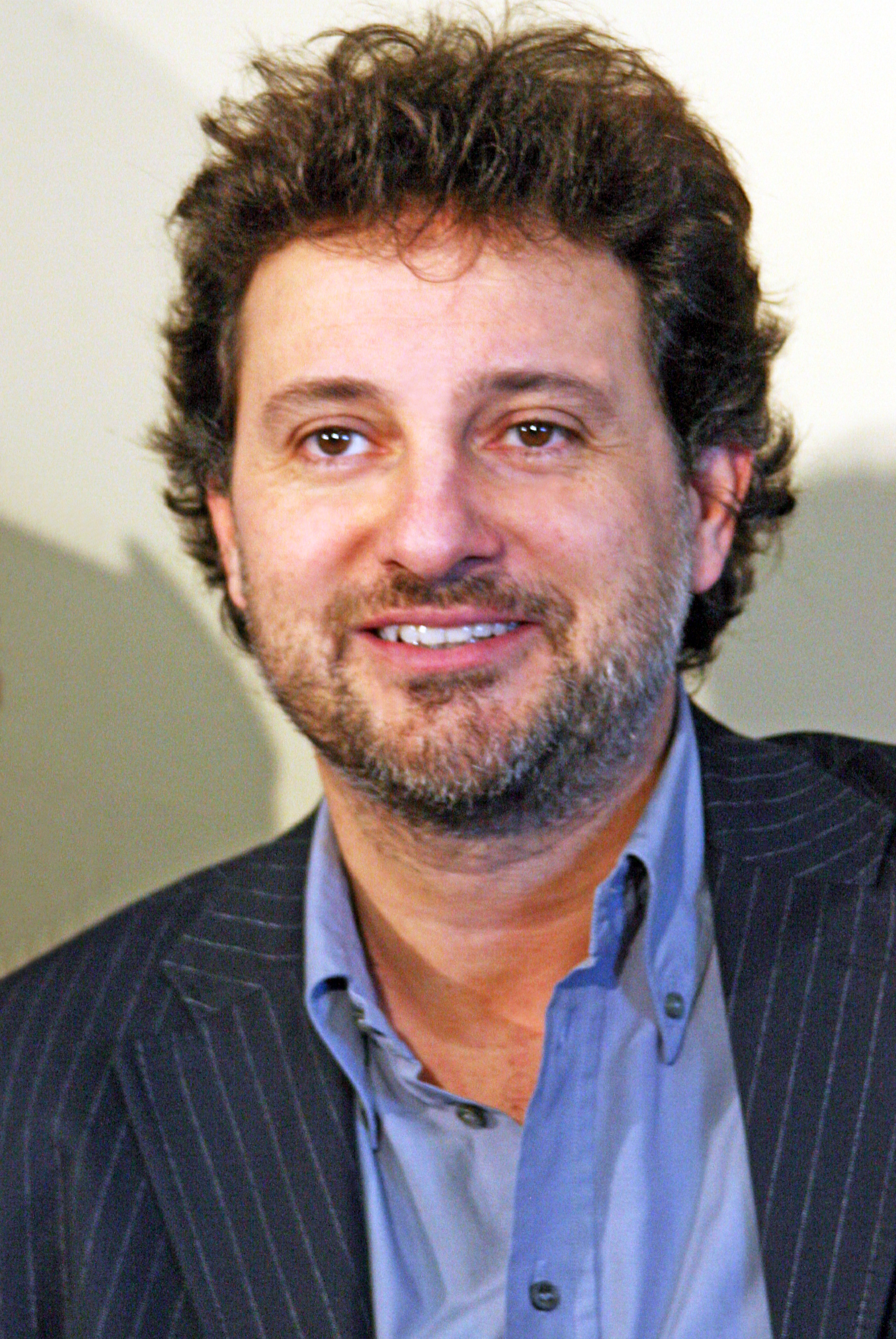
- Born: 17 February 1965 (age 61); Florence, Italy
- Occupations: Actor; film director; screenwriter; comedian
- Height: 1.78 m (5 ft 10 in)

Leonardo Pieraccioni (born 17 February 1965) is an Italian film director, actor, comedian, screenwriter and cabaret performer.

Born in Florence, he made his directorial debut with The Graduates (1995). In 1996 he directed his breakthrough film The Cyclone, which grossed 78 billion lire at the box office.

In 1998, he starred with Harvey Keitel and David Bowie in the western comedy Gunslinger's Revenge, directed by Giovanni Veronesi.

Also a writer of short stories, his books include Trent'anni, alta, mora (1998), Tre mucche in cucina (2002) and A un passo dal cielo (2003). Pieraccioni has starred with Suzie Kennedy, the impersonator of Marilyn Monroe, in Me and Marilyn.

He plays a priest performing an exorcism in the music video for Lucio Corsi's song "Volevo essere un duro".

== Filmography ==
Film
| Year | Title | Actor | Director | Writer | Notes | Ref. |
|---|---|---|---|---|---|---|
| 1991 | The Party's Over | Yes | No | No | | |
| 1993 | Bonus malus | Yes | No | No | | |
| 1994 | Miracolo italiano | Yes | No | No | | |
| 1995 | The Graduates | Yes | Yes | Yes | | |
| 1996 | The Cyclone | Yes | Yes | Yes | | |
| 1997 | Fireworks | Yes | Yes | Yes | | |
| 1998 | Viola Kisses Everybody | Yes | No | No | Cameo role | |
| 1998 | Gunslinger's Revenge | Yes | No | Yes | | |
| 1999 | The Fish in Love | Yes | Yes | Yes | | |
| 2001 | The Prince and the Pirate | Yes | Yes | Yes | | |
| 2003 | Suddenly Paradise | Yes | Yes | Yes | Also producer | |
| 2005 | I Love You in Every Language in the World | Yes | Yes | Yes | | |
| 2007 | Manual of Love 2 | Yes | No | No | Uncredited cameo | |
| 2007 | A Beautiful Wife | Yes | Yes | Yes | | |
| 2009 | Me and Marilyn | Yes | Yes | Yes | | |
| 2011 | Finalmente la felicità | Yes | Yes | Yes | | |
| 2013 | Un fantastico via vai | Yes | Yes | Yes | | |
| 2014 | Blame Freud | No | No | Story | | |
| 2015 | Il professor Cenerentolo | Yes | Yes | Yes | | |
| 2018 | Se son rose | Yes | Yes | Yes | | |
| 2022 | Il sesso degli angeli | Yes | Yes | Yes | | |
| 2024 | Pare parecchio Parigi | Yes | Yes | Yes | | |
| 2024 | Io e te dobbiamo parlare | Yes | No | No | | |
| 2026 | Un weekend artificiale | Yes | Yes | Yes | | |
