= LGBTQ rights in Italy =

- Italy wrapped in the colors of the rainbow flag
- Legal status: Same-sex activity legal nationwide since 1890, with an equal age of consent (14) legal in Tuscany since 1853 (as the Grand Duchy of Tuscany), in Sicily since 1819 (as the Kingdom of the Two Sicilies) and in Naples since 1810 (as the Kingdom of Naples)
- Gender identity: Transgender people allowed to change legal gender (since 1982) Sterilization not required (since 2015)
- Military: Gays, lesbians and bisexuals allowed to serve openly since 2010
- Discrimination protections: Sexual orientation protections in employment (Since 2003) Discriminatory content targeting sexual orientation and gender identity banned in street advertisement nationwide (since 2021) Sexual orientation and gender identity protections in the provision of goods and services at a regional level in Tuscany, Piedmont, Liguria, Marche, Umbria, Sicily, Emilia-Romagna, Campania and Apulia

Family rights
- Recognition of relationships: Civil unions since 2016
- Adoption: Stepchild adoption (since 2016) Same-sex couples are eligible to become foster families Joint adoption of adults by same-sex couples in civil unions (since 2026) National adoption by LGBT individuals and same-sex couples in particular circumstances International adoption by single individuals, regardless of sexual orientation (since 2025) Automatic legal recognition of both mothers in lesbian couples following medically assisted reproduction abroad (since 2025) Mandatory 10-day paternity leave entitlement for non-biological mothers in same-sex couples (since 2025)

Lesbian, gay, bisexual, transgender, and queer (LGBTQ) rights in Italy significantly advanced in the 21st century, thanks to both legislation and Constitutional Court and Supreme Court of Cassation rulings, although LGBTQ people still face various challenges not experienced by non-LGBT residents, despite public opinion being increasingly liberal and in favor of LGBT rights. Both male and female same-sex sexual activity has been legal since 1890, when a new penal code was promulgated.

A civil union law was passed in May 2016, providing same-sex couples with all of the rights of marriage except for joint adoption rights. The law also recognizes same-sex couples as a family. Stepchild adoption was excluded from the bill, but in June 2016 the Supreme Court of Cassation stated that courts can allow a couple in a civil union to adopt their stepchildren. The same law provides both same-sex and heterosexual couples which live in an unregistered cohabitation with several legal rights. In May 2025, the Constitutional Court ruled that when a lesbian couple has a child through IVF abroad, both women can be automatically registered as the child's mothers, without having to go through stepchild adoption.Same sex couples can jointly adopt an adult.

In April 2025, the Supreme Court ruled that children with same-sex parents must have gender-neutral terms on their ID documents instead of "mother" and "father." This change ensures that documents reflect the child's actual family structure and effectively removes a discriminatory rule. In July 2025, the Constitutional Court ruled that the non-biological mother in a lesbian couple is entitled to mandatory parental leave. In May 2026, the Constitutional Court ruled that surviving partners in same-sex marriages performed abroad are entitled to a survivor's pension even if the spouse died before the 2016 Civil Unions Act, extending the entitlement retrospectively.

However, according to ILGA-Europe's 2021 report, the status of LGBT rights in Italy is below the standards of other Western European countries – such as still not recognizing same-sex marriage, lacking nationwide discrimination protections for goods and services, as well as not granting to same-sex couples full parental rights, such as joint adoption and IVF. Italy and Japan are the only G7 nations where same-sex marriages are not recognized.

Transgender people have been allowed to legally change their gender since 1982. Italy became the sixth country in the world to legally acknowledge the right of individuals to change their gender. Prior to this, only Denmark (1929), Sweden (1972), Chile (1974), Norway (1979), and West Germany (1980) had introduced similar legal recognition. The proposal for this legal reform faced little opposition: both chambers of the Italian Parliament unanimously agreed to assign the responsibility of finalising the law to their respective Standing Committees on Justice. As a result, once the Committees approved the draft, the law was enacted immediately, bypassing the need for additional votes in Parliament. Since 2015, undergoing surgery (sterilization) is no longer required in order to change one's legal gender in Italy. In 2020, hormone therapy became fully covered by the national healthcare system, making it accessible free of charge. More recently, in 2024, judicial authorisation is no longer necessary to access gender-affirming surgeries, as long as legal sex change has occurred, further reducing legal and bureaucratic barriers for transgender individuals seeking medical transition.

Although discrimination regarding sexual orientation in employment has been banned since 2003, no other anti-discrimination laws regarding sexual orientation or gender identity and expression have been enacted nationwide, although some Italian regions have enacted far more comprehensive anti-discrimination laws.

A 2025 Ipsos poll shows that 80% of Italians support legal recognition of same-sex unions. Meanwhile, an Eurispes survey reveals that 66.8% back same-sex marriage, and 63% support adoption by same-sex couples.

The Eurispes Italy Report highlights a substantial and sustained increase in Italian support for LGBT+ rights and recognition of diverse family structures. Support for marriage equality rose from 47.8% in 2016 to 50.9% in 2019, 58.4% in 2021, 59.2% in 2023 and 64.5% in 2024, representing an increase of almost 20 percentage points over the 10-year period. The 2026 findings show that this upward trend has continued, with 66% of Italians now expressing support for same-sex marriage, a figure broadly consistent with the 65% recorded in 2025. Legal protection for unmarried couples, regardless of sex, also enjoys widespread support. Approval increased slightly from 69.3% in 2024 to 69.6% in 2026. Attitudes towards same-sex parenting and adoption have also shifted. In 2024, 54.5% of Italians supported adoption by same-sex couples, an increase of 23.4 percentage points compared with 2019, while adoption by single people received stronger backing, at 61.5%. By 2026, support had reached 55.2% for adoption by same-sex couples and 55.8% for adoption by single individuals. Recognition of children of same-sex couples was supported by 58.4% of Italians in 2024, including the adoption of a partner's child and recognition of children born abroad through heterologous assisted reproduction or surrogacy. In 2026, 56.9% continued to support the legal recognition of children of same-sex couples.

Overall, the Eurispes figures point to a high and generally increasing level of public support for the legal recognition of same-sex couples and families in Italy, although the evolution differs somewhat depending on the specific right under consideration.

== Legality of same-sex sexual activity in Italy ==
Same-sex sexual activity has been legal nationwide since 1890. The age of consent is 14 years old, regardless of gender and sexual orientation.

Italy is among the few European nations to have had an equal age of consent for homosexual and heterosexual acts ever since before the 20th century. The only nations in which there has been an equal age of consent for longer than Italy are Turkey (which equalized it in 1858) and the microstates of San Marino (which equalized it in 1864), Monaco (which equalized it in 1793) and Andorra (which equalized it in 1791). (Note: This list only takes into account the amount of time which has passed since the last time the age of consent was equalised. In some nations, such as Belgium, France and the Netherlands, homosexuality was decriminalised in the late 18th century with an equal age of consent, but the age of consent for homosexual acts was raised in the first half of the 20th century, and ultimately equalising once again at the end in more recent times.) Meanwhile, in nearly every other European country, laws either setting a higher age of consent for homosexual acts or banning them altogether (Note: This list also includes laws which were unenforced or largely unenforced.) remained in force until the 20th century and sometimes even until the early 21st century, although they were not always actively enforced.

=== History ===
Italian unification in 1861 brought together a number of States, almost all of whom abolished punishment for private, non-commercial homosexual acts between consenting adults as a result of the Napoleonic Code. However, of the Penal Code promulgated in 1859 by Victor Emmanuel II of the Kingdom of Sardinia still punished consensual homosexual acts under Article 425, which read:

425. Lustful acts against nature [...] (Note: The part here omitted dealt with homosexual rape.) shall, if they have given rise to a complaint or caused a scandal, carry the penalty of imprisonment or of hard labour for no more than ten years.

(Note: Full Italian version: "425. Qualunque atto di libidine contro natura, se sarà commesso con violenza, nei modi e nelle circostanze prevedute dagli articoli 489 e 490, sarà punito' colla reclusione non minore di anni sette, estensibile ai lavori forzati a tempo: se non vi sarà stata violenza, ma vi sarà intervenuto scandalo o vi sarà stata querela, sarà punito colla reclusione, e' potrà la pena anche estendersi' ai lavori forzati per anni dieci, a seconda dei casi.")

With unification, the former Kingdom of Sardinia extended its own criminalizing legislation to the rest of the newly born Kingdom of Italy, with some exceptions: in the former Grand Duchy of Tuscany, the Penal Code of 1853 promulgated by Leopold II (which did not criminalize same-sex activities) remained in force, and the same happens in Sicily (as the Kingdom of the Two Sicilies, since 1819) and in Naples (as the Kingdom of Naples, since 1810). In addition, some Articles of the Sardinian Penal Code (including those dealing with homosexuality) were not extended to the former Kingdom of the Two Sicilies.

This bizarre situation, where homosexuality was illegal in one part of the kingdom, but legal in another, was only reconciled in 1889, with the promulgation of the Zanardelli Code which abolished all differences in treatment between homosexual and heterosexual acts across the entire territory of Italy. This Penal Code became effective in 1890, and there have since been no laws against private, consensual homosexual relations between people over the age of consent.

In the 1920s, fascist MP Alfredo Rocco was tasked by the government of Benito Mussolini to develop a new Penal Code which would have replaced the 1889 one.

A first draft of the Code, published by Rocco in 1927, included a provision criminalizing homosexual acts, which read:

Article 528.

Homosexual acts.

Whomsoever [...] (Note: The part here omitted dealt with homosexual rape, and clarified it carried the same penalties as heterosexual rape.) has carnal knowledge of the same sex, or lets a person of the same sex have carnal knowledge of himself or herself, shall, if such acts give rise to a public scandal, suffer imprisonment for six months to three years.
The offender shall suffer imprisonment for one to five years—
1. if he or she, being older than 21, engages in such acts with a person younger than 18; or
2. if the said acts are engaged in habitually, or in exchange for money.

(Note: Full original version: "Art. 528. Relazioni omosessuali Chiunque, fuori dai casi preveduti negli articoli da 519 a 521, commette atti di libidine con lo stesso sesso, ovvero si presta a tali atti, sarà punito, se dal fatto derivi pubblico scandalo, con la reclusione da sei mesi a tre anni. La pena è della reclusione da un anno e cinque anni 1°-se il colpevole, essendo maggiore degli anni ventuno, commetta il fatto su una persona maggiore degli anni diciotto 2°-se gli atti sono commessi abitualmente, o a fine di lucro".)

When Rocco eventually introduced the new Penal Code before Parliament, he decided not to include said Article, claiming that "in Italy, the abominable vice is not present to such an extent that the criminal law should concern itself with it".

As such, the final version of the Rocco Code, which became law in 1931, had no mention of same-sex intercourse. According to fascist doctrine, repression of certain sexual practices was a matter for moral authorities moreso than for the State. Nonetheless, those who displayed their homosexuality in public were targeted by the fascist police, and subject to extrajudicial punishments such as public admonition and exile; gay people were persecuted in the later years of the regime of Benito Mussolini, and under the Italian Social Republic of 1943–45.

The arrangements of the Rocco Code, namely, the principle that homosexual conduct is an issue of morality and religion, and not criminal sanctions by the State, have remained in place over subsequent decades. In the early 1960s, three bills aiming at re-criminalising gay sex were introduced, but none of them were ever even put up to a vote, due to lack of support from the Christian Democratic majority.

== Recognition of same-sex relationships ==
At present, while same-sex couples cannot marry, they can access civil unions, enacted in 2016, which provide all of the rights, benefits and obligations of marriage except for joint adoption rights. These benefits include, amongst others, shared property, social security, inheritance and pension.

Since the 2005 regional elections, many Italian regions governed by centre-left coalitions have passed resolutions in support of French-style PACS (civil unions), including Tuscany, Umbria, Sicily, Campania, Marche, Veneto, Apulia, Lazio, Liguria, Abruzzo and Emilia-Romagna. Lombardy, led by the centre-right House of Freedoms, officially declared their opposition to any recognition of same-sex relationships. All these actions, however, are merely symbolic as regions do not have legislative power on the matter.

Although several bills on civil unions or the recognition of rights to unregistered couples had been introduced into the Parliament since 1996, none had ever been approved, owing to the strong opposition of socially conservative members of Parliament from both coalitions. On 8 February 2007, the Government led by Romano Prodi introduced a bill which would have granted rights in the areas of labour law, inheritance, taxation and health care to same-sex and opposite-sex unregistered partnerships. However, Parliament was dissolved before the draft law could be put up to a vote, and was ultimately shelved when the next election resulted in a conservative majority.

In 2010, the Constitutional Court (Corte Costituzionale) issued a landmark ruling which recognized same-sex couples as a "legitimate social formation, similar to, and deserving homogeneous treatment of, marriage". Since that ruling, the Supreme Court of Cassation (Corte di Cassazione, the supreme and last revision court in most matters) remanded a decision by a Justice of the Peace who had rejected a residence permit to an Algerian citizen, married in Spain to a Spaniard of the same sex. The Court stated that the questura (police office, where residence permits are issued) should deliver a residence permit to a foreigner married with an Italian citizen of his same sex, and cited the ruling.

On 21 July 2015, the European Court of Human Rights ruled in Oliari v. Italy that Italy's lack of any sort of recognition for same-sex partnership was a violation of international human rights.

On 2 February 2016, Italian senators started to debate a bill introducing civil unions, inspired from the civil union law in Germany which would have granted all rights afforded by marriage short of joint adoption. On 25 February 2016, an amended version of the bill (which, unlike the original proposal, did not include the right to stepchild adoption by gay couples), was approved by the Senate in a 173–71 vote, and was sent to the Chamber of Deputies, where it passed on 11 May 2016, by a vote of 372 to 51, with 99 abstentions. In order to ensure swift passage of the draft law, Prime Minister Matteo Renzi decided to treat the vote on the law as a matter of confidence, saying that it was "unacceptable to have any more delays after years of failed attempts." Italian President Sergio Mattarella signed the bill into law on 20 May 2016.

In 2017, the Italian Supreme Court allowed a marriage between two women, which was performed in neighboring France, to be officially recognised. However, in May 2018, the Court of Cassation ruled that same-sex marriages performed abroad cannot be recognized in Italy. Instead, they must be registered as civil unions, regardless of whether the couple wed before or after Italy introduced civil unions in 2016.

On 10 March 2023, Ivan Scalfarotto introduced a bill which aimed to legalize same-sex marriage. In the same day, Gian Marco Centinaio, Vice President of the Senate and member of the League, said the centre-right majority would "start looking into Scalfarotto's proposal", adding "I think society progresses, and I believe we must march forwards and not backwards". Since then, there has been no progress on the bill, and Centinaio has retracted his statement, claiming that he had been "misunderstood" and that he's still against same-sex marriage.

On 28 May 2026, the Constitutional Court ruled that it is unconstitutional to deny a survivor's pension to the surviving partner of a same-sex couple who legally married abroad, even when the insured spouse died before Italy's 2016 Civil Unions Act came into force. The Court held that, although foreign same-sex marriages were not recognized in Italy at the time, current legislation grants them the effects of a civil union and provides equal survivor's pension rights. As a result, excluding surviving partners solely because the death occurred before the 2016 reform creates an unjustified disparity of treatment and violates the constitutional principle of equality.

== Adoption and parenting ==
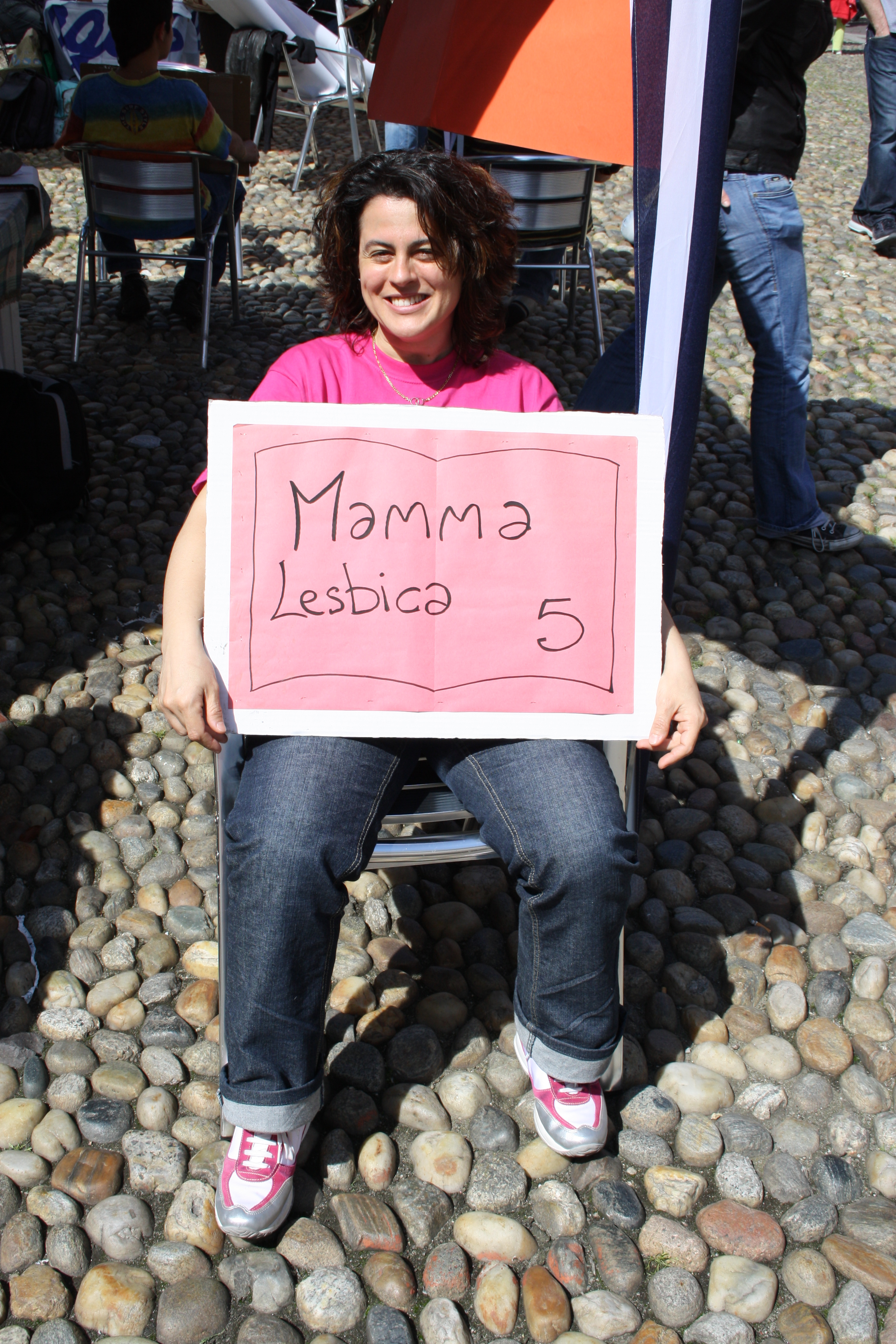
Lesbian Mom at a 'talking book' event in Pavia in 2010, where people told their stories to combat homophobia.

Adoption and foster care in Italy are governed by Law No. 184 of 1983. In general, national adoption is permitted only for married, opposite-sex couples. However, there are no legal restrictions on foster care. Italian law also allows for "adoption in particular cases," which may be granted to single individuals, including those who identify as LGBT. This provision has been interpreted by some courts—also at the appellate level—to include the possibility of stepchild adoption by unmarried couples, regardless of whether they are opposite-sex or same-sex. Additionally, single LGBT individuals may pursue international adoption in countries where adoption by single persons is permitted. These adoptions are automatically recognized under Italian law.

On 11 January 2013, the Court of Cassation upheld a lower decision of court which granted the sole custody of a child to a lesbian mother. The father of the child complained about the "homosexual relationship of the mother". The Supreme Court rejected the father's appeal because it was not argued properly.

Several individual cases where same-sex couples have been allowed to legally adopt or foster children have occurred over the years. On 15 November 2013, it was reported that the Court of Bologna chose a same-sex couple to foster a three-year-old child. On 1 March 2016, a Rome family court approved a lesbian couple's request to simultaneously adopt each other's daughters. From 2014 to 2016, the Rome Family Court made at least 15 rulings upholding requests for gay people to be allowed to adopt their partners' children. On 29 April 2016, Marilena Grassadonia, president of the Rainbow Families Association, won the right to adopt her wife's twin boys. The possibility of adopting one's same-sex partner's child through the "adoption in particular cases" provision was confirmed by the Court of Cassation in a decision published on 22 June 2016. This provision implies resorting to a civil lawsuit where "a rigorous factual investigation carried out by the court, effectively ascertains that adoption is in the child's best interest".

In February 2017, the Trento Court of Appeals recognized both male same-sex partners as fathers of two children born with the help of an egg donor and a surrogate mother in Canada. The decision was challenged ln late 2017 by local officials and the Ministry of the Interior. In May 2019, the Court of Cassation ruled that the fathers cannot both be named on the children's Italian birth certificates. Instead, only the biological father will be listed as their legal parent, while his partner will have to apply for special permission to become their adoptive father, despite the fact that both men are named on the children's Canadian birth certificates.

In March 2017, the Florence Court for Minors recognised a foreign adoption by a same-sex couple. The Milan Court of Appeal also recognised a foreign same-sex adoption in June 2017.

In January 2018, after a surrogate mother gave birth to twin boys for a same-sex couple in California, Milan officials refused to register the boys as both the fathers' children. At first, a judge ruled against the couple, who later appealed; a higher court held that since each man's sperm was used to fertilise eggs from the same donor and one of each was implanted into the surrogate, both men would be able to register the birth of their own child and become its legal parent. The twins cannot be recognised as children of the couple, however, and the fathers could not adopt each other's non-biological son. Although not legally brothers, both boys have been given the same surname. Despite this contradiction, LGBT association Famiglie Arcobaleno, has welcomed the court's decision as a "positive step".

In April 2018, a lesbian couple in Turin was permitted by city officials to register their son, born through IVF, as the child of both parents. Two other same-sex couples also had their children officially registered. A few days later, a same-sex couple in Rome was similarly allowed to register their daughter.

In March 2021, Italy recognized the adoptions abroad by same-sex couples because they were judged to be non-obstructive for the purposes of the adoption itself. The Court of Cassation ruled that the adoption of a child abroad by a homosexual couple can be recognized and transcribed into Italian civil records, provided the adoption does not involve surrogacy. The case involved a male couple, one of whom was an Italian citizen residing in the United States. They had adopted a child in New York, and the Italian authorities initially refused to register the adoption. The Court of Cassation upheld the lower court's decision to recognize the adoption, emphasizing that the adoption was in the child's best interest and did not contravene Italian public policy.

In September 2022, a court in Rome ruled that the government's requirement that children's ID cards list their "mother" and "father" discriminated against same-sex parents and ordered the government to issue documents that correctly identify the parents. The ruling is permanent, but only applied to this specific case. Unless and until the government changes the rules around ID cards, other parents will have to sue for correct identification as well. However, in April 2025, the Supreme Court of Cassation in Italy has ruled to replace the terms "father" and "mother" on Italian ID cards with the gender-neutral term "genitori" (parents) immediately. The Court found that using "father" and "mother" was discriminatory toward same-sex couples' children, as it did not reflect the diversity of modern family structures. This ruling is seen as a significant move towards promoting equality and inclusivity, recognizing that family identities should not be limited by traditional gender roles. It ensures that all families, regardless of their makeup, are equally represented in official documents.

On 30 March 2023, the European Parliament approved by show of hands a resolution formally condemning the Italian Government's policy regarding same-sex couples' parental rights.

In 2023, a lesbian couple in a civil union was allowed by a court to foster a disabled child.

In March 2024, the Court of Padua rejected a 2023 order by the prosecutor's office, which was based on a new bill passed by the Meloni Government, aimed at having only biological parents' names on birth certicates. The order challenged the Municipality's decision to register the children of two mothers and was to retroactively remove non-biological mothers from the birth certificates of 37 children dating back to 2017; however, the court found it inadmissible.

In October 2024, the Meloni-led Italian government passed a new law defining surrogacy a "universal crime" [sic]. The practice of surrogacy was already illegal in Italy, but this new bill criminalizes couples that seek surrogacy abroad in countries where it is legal, so that upon returning to Italy they are faced with jail sentences of up to two years and fines of up to €1 million. This deprives Italian gay couples of the only means they have to become parents, because adoptions aren't permitted for same-sex couples in Italy. While government officials stated that the bill is not aimed at gay couples, but at anyone using surrogacy, with the intent of "protecting women's dignity", the bill's proponent, Carolina Varchi, stated that the legislation was a way to oppose L.G.B.T. "ideology." Analysts considered the legislation as a means for Ms. Meloni to appeal to her political base, which strongly opposes surrogacy and adoption by gay couples.

In March 2025, Italy's Constitutional Court ruled that single individuals, including LGBT singles, can adopt foreign minors, overturning a 40-year ban that restricted adoption to married couples. The court declared the 1983 law unconstitutional, emphasizing that excluding singles could undermine children's rights to a stable family environment. The requirements for adoption remain the same for heterosexual couples.

In May 2025, Italy's Constitutional Court ruled that it is unconstitutional to deny legal automatic recognition to the non-biological (or "intentional") mother in same-sex female couples when medically assisted reproduction is performed abroad, meaning both women must be recognized as legal parents on the birth certificate from birth without the need for a separate adoption process. In its Judgment No. 68/2025, the Court found that Article 8 of Law 40/2004 violated multiple constitutional provisions - specifically Article 2 (personal identity), Article 3 (equality), and Article 30 (rights of the child) - by failing to guarantee the child a clear and stable legal identity from birth and by discriminating against children of same-sex parents. This decision was widely hailed as a landmark advancement for LGBTQ+ rights in Italy, particularly for same-sex families, ensuring full legal recognition of both mothers from the moment of birth in cases involving reproduction abroad.

In July 2025, Italy's Constitutional Court ruled that a non-biological mother in a same-sex union is entitled to the same paternity leave benefits granted to a biological father, formally equating her role with that of the father and ensuring bonding time with the newborn. The Court found that a 2001 decree on parental leave was unconstitutional because it failed to recognize that the non-biological mother in a lesbian civil union was entitled to Italy's mandatory 10-day paternity leave. It emphasized that denying such leave would undermine equality and the child's right to care from both parents, reinforcing that parental rights and responsibilities stem as much from the intentional choice to become a parent as from biology. This judgment marked a significant step forward for LGBTQ+ family rights in Italy, ensuring that non-biological mothers receive equal treatment in both legal recognition and practical parental benefits.

In November 2026, Italy’s Constitutional Court ruled that same-sex couples in civil unions can jointly adopt adults, declaring unconstitutional the legal provision that had restricted joint adoption to married couples. In Judgment No. 195/2026, the Court recognized that civil unions constitute family relationships capable of establishing a shared legal parent-child bond, ensuring that an adopted adult can be legally recognized as the child of both partners, with corresponding inheritance rights. The ruling marked a further development in the legal recognition of same-sex families in Italy.

== Discrimination protections ==
=== Employment discrimination ===
Discrimination on the basis of sexual orientation in employment has been illegal throughout the whole country, since July 2003 when, in order to conform with European Union directives, the second Berlusconi government issued Legislative Decree no. 216 of 2003, entitled "Implementation of Directive 2000/78/EC on equal treatment in employment and occupation" (Italian: Attuazione della direttiva 2000/78/CE per la parità di trattamento in materia di occupazione e di condizioni di lavoro), which prohibits unfair discrimination in employment and recruitment processes. The anti-discrimination provisions originally did not apply to the police, to the armed forces and to rescue services, but this exception was removed by Law no. 101 of 2008. One of the most famous convictions under Italy's anti-discrimination laws was that of lawyer Carlo Taormina, who in July 2013 during a radio interview declared that he would never hire a gay man in his law firm. A Court in Bergamo sentenced Taormina to the payment of 10,000 euros and ordered the publication of the ruling on a national newspaper at his expense.

No Italian law explicitly bans transphobic discrimination. However, on 15 January 2023, a court in Rome ruled against a school who had fired a trans professor due to her gender identity, claiming that it amounted to sex discrimination.

=== Asylum protections ===
Italy recognizes persecution based on sexual orientation or gender identity as grounds for asylum, in line with international human rights standards, including the 1951 Geneva Convention and the EU Qualification Directive (2011/95/EU). As a member of the European Union, Italy provides protection for individuals facing persecution due to their sexual orientation or gender identity. Since October 22, 2020, Italy has implemented reforms through Decree-Law No. 130/2020, which simplified asylum procedures and reinforced protections for vulnerable groups, including those persecuted on the grounds of sexual orientation or gender identity. These reforms strengthened Italy's commitment to the protection of LGBTQ+ individuals, in alignment with international standards that classify them as a particular social group eligible for asylum.

=== Hate crimes and hate speech ===
In 2002, Franco Grillini proposed a constitutional amendment that would have included sexual orientation among constitutionally protected characteristics. It was not successful.

In 2006, Grillini again introduced a proposal to expand anti-discrimination laws, this time adding gender identity as well as sexual orientation. It received even less support than the previous one had.

In 2008, Danilo Giuffrida was awarded 100,000 euros compensation after having been ordered to re-take his driving test by the Italian Ministry of Infrastructure and Transport due to his sexuality; the judge said that the Ministry of Transport was in clear breach of anti-discrimination laws.

In 2009, the Chamber of Deputies shelved a proposal against homophobic hate crimes that would have allowed increased sentences for violence against gay and bisexual individuals, passing a motion to that effect which had been proposed by Union of the Centre and supported by Lega Nord and The People of Freedom. Paola Binetti, Democratic Party MP, broke party lines and voted for the motion.

On 16 May 2013, a bill which would prohibit discrimination based on sexual orientation and gender identity was presented in a press conference by four deputies of four different parties. The bill is cosponsored by 221 MPs of the Chamber of Deputies, but no member of the center-right parties has pledged support. In addition to this bill, some deputies introduced another two bills. On 7 July, the Justice Committee advanced a unified bill.

The bill was amended in compliance of the request of some conservative MPs who were afraid of being fined or jailed for stating their opposition to the recognition of same-sex unions. On 5 August, the Chamber started to consider the bill. On 19 September 2013, the Chamber of Deputies passed the bill in a 228–58 vote (and 108 abstentions). On the same day, a controversial amendment passed, which would protect free speech for politicians and clergymen. On 29 April 2014, the Senate of the Republic began examining the bill. In 2019, the bill was still in the Senate Judicial Commission, being blocked by several hundred amendments from conservative MPs.

In July 2020, debate resumed on the proposal to extend anti-racism laws to outlaw discrimination and hate crimes against women, gay and transgender people, following a number of attacks in preceding months against LGBT people. It modifies an existing law punishing offenses based on someone's race or religion with up to four years in jail. The proposal, drafted by Democratic Party MP Alessandro Zan, supported by the centre-left coalition, while the Lega, Brothers of Italy and the Italian bishops' conference opposed it; Forza Italia treated the Bill as a matter of consciousness and granted its MPs a free vote.

Italy's lower house approved the bill on 4 November 2020 by a vote of 265 to 193. The bill died in the Senate on 27 October 2021 following a 131—154 secret ballot vote.

On 28 October 2021, the Chamber of Deputies approved in a 271–16 vote a proposed infrastructure law containing a provision which made it illegal to display advertisement containing homophobic or transphobic messages on streets and vehicles. The draft law was approved by the Senate as well on 4 November in a 190–34 vote. In both Houses, the Government used its powers under the Standing Orders to force a single vote on the whole Bill, contrary to the usual procedure, whereby a vote on the full Bill must be preceded by a vote on each Article and on each proposed amendment. This forced MPs who opposed the anti-discrimination provision but supported other parts of the Bill to vote in favour. The proposal was ultimately signed into law by President Sergio Mattarella on 9 November and came into force on 10 November.

=== Regional laws ===
In 2004, Tuscany became the first Italian region to ban discrimination based on sexual orientation and gender identity in the areas of employment, education, public services and accommodations. The Berlusconi Government challenged the new law in court, asserting that only the central Government had the right to pass such a law. The Constitutional Court overturned the provisions regarding accommodations (with respect to private homes and religious institutions), but otherwise upheld most of the legislation. Since then, the regions of Liguria (November 2009), Marche (February 2010), Sicily (March 2015), Piedmont (June 2016), Umbria (April 2017), Emilia-Romagna (July 2019), Campania (August 2020) and Apulia (July 2024) enacted similar measures.

== Gender identity and expression ==
Cross-dressing is legal in Italy, and sex reassignment surgeries are also legal, with medical approval. However, gender identity is not mentioned in Italy's anti-discrimination laws, meaning that transgender people may face discrimination in areas such as employment, access to goods and services, housing, education and health services.

There is a history of third genders in Italy, such as the Femminiello in traditional Neapolitan culture, as well as there being accounts of individuals spending significant portions of their life as genders other than the ones they were assigned at birth, such as Catterina Vizzani in the early-to-mid-1700s.

During the period of fascist rule in Italy from the 1920s to the 1940s, the penal code contained prohibitions against cross-dressing and trans people were targeted by police for arrests. The first documented Italian trans woman to undergo genital reconstruction surgery did so in Switzerland in 1967. However, on her return to Italy, she was detained and confined to a small village in the south of the country.

In 1982, Italy became the sixth nation in the world to recognise the right to change one's legal gender. Before Italy, only Denmark (1929), Sweden (1972), Chile (1974), Norway (1979) and Germany (then-West Germany) (1980) recognised this right. The bill introducing this reform was largely noncontroversial: both Houses of Parliament agreed without objection to delegate the task of passing the draft law to their respective Standing Committees on Justice; therefore, once the law was approved by the said Committees, it was immediately enacted, without the need for further parliamentary votes.

In 2006, a police officer was reportedly fired for cross-dressing in public while off duty.

The first transgender MP was Vladimir Luxuria, who was elected in 2006 as a representative of the Communist Refoundation Party. While she was not reelected, she went on to be the winner of a popular reality television show called L'Isola dei Famosi.

In 2005, a couple got legally married as husband and wife. Some years later, one of the parties transitioned as a transgender woman. In 2009, she was legally recognized as such according to Law no. 164 of 1982 (Legge 14 aprile 1982, n. 164). Later, the couple discovered that their marriage had been dissolved because the couple became a same-sex couple, even though they did not ask a civil court to divorce. The law prescribes that when a transgender person is married to another person the couple should divorce, but in the case of the transgender woman mentioned above (Alessandra) and her wife, there was no will to divorce. The couple asked the Civil Court of Modena to nullify the order of dissolution of their marriage. On 27 October 2010, the court ruled in favour of the couple. The Italian Ministry of Interior appealed the decision, and the Court of Appeal of Bologna subsequently reversed the trial decision. The couple later appealed the decision to the Court of Cassation. On 6 June 2013, the Cassation asked the Constitutional Court whether the 1982 law was unconstitutional when it ordered the dissolution of marriage by applying the Law no. 898 of 1970 (Legge 1 dicembre 1970, n. 898), which regulates divorces, even if the couple did not ask to do so. In 2014, the Constitutional Court finally ruled the case in favour of the couple, allowing them to remain married.

On 21 May 2015, the Court of Cassation ruled that sterilisation and sex reassignment surgery are not required in order to obtain a legal gender change.

On 15 February 2023, a Court in Trento ruled transgender minors could have their legal gender changed on documents as long as their parents consent and a psychologist has been consulted on the matter.

On 6 July 2023, a Court in Trapani recognized for the first time the right of a transgender woman to change her name and gender identity in the registry office without any surgery performed or planned and without any hormone therapy.

In 2018, the Italian National Bioethics Committee and the Italian Medicines Agency released an opinion that was supportive of the use of puberty blockers in adolescents with gender dysphoria on a case-by-case basis and with some safeguards. However, they also called for more research to better understand its effects. As of February 2019, puberty blockers and cross sex hormones are provided free of charge in Italy and are covered by the National Health Service. Still, challenges with accessing puberty blocker medications persist. Specific clinical criteria must be satisfied for treatment including comprehensive medical evaluations, parental consent, and the exhaustion of all other clinical interventions.

The use of puberty blockers in transgender youth is supported by:

- The Italian Society of Endocrinology (SIE)
- The Italian Society of Andrology and Sexual Medicine (SIAMS)
- The Italian Society of Gender, Identity and Health (SIGIS)
- The Italian Academy of Pediatrics
- The Italian Society of Pediatrics
- The Italian Society for Pediatric Endocrinology and Diabetes
- The Italian Society of Adolescent Medicine
- The Italian Society of Child and Adolescent Neuropsychiatry

In 2024, the Italian Constitutional Court, with judgment no. 143 of July 23, explicitly recognized for the first time the existence of non-binary individuals, affirming that they too are entitled to the protection of fundamental rights guaranteed by the Constitution—such as the right to personal identity, health, and equal social dignity (Articles 2, 3, and 32). However, the Court declared inadmissible the request to introduce a "non-binary" gender marker in the civil registry, stating that such a profound change to Italy's legal and administrative system—still firmly rooted in a male/female binary—requires legislative action and cannot be enacted through judicial interpretation alone. At the same time, the Court ruled unconstitutional the legal requirement for judicial authorization to access gender-affirming surgery after legal gender rectification, considering it an unjustified obstacle to individual self-determination.

In summary, the decision marks an important step toward the recognition of non-conforming gender identities, but it leaves unresolved the full legal recognition of non-binary gender, which remains in the hands of Parliament. Non-binary individuals are now recognized as subjects of rights. It is no longer mandatory to obtain a judge's authorization to undergo gender-affirming surgery after the legal change of gender. For the first time, the Court explicitly acknowledges that there are individuals who do not identify as male or female, and affirms that their right to identity is constitutionally protected (Articles 2, 3, and 32). The obligation to obtain judicial authorization for surgery after legal gender rectification was declared unconstitutional, as it is no longer justified.

== Military service ==
Until 1986, "sexual deviance" was a reason for exclusion for military service. At that time, some men claimed to be homosexual to avoid the draft. Lesbians have never been banned from the Italian military since women were first allowed to serve in 2000. Since 2010, discrimination against gays and lesbians in military service is banned, but the situation for transgender people is unclear. The organization Polis Aperta estimates that 5 to 10% of Italians in uniformed service (military or police) are LGBT. Despite the ban on discrimination, some service personnel face harassment or violence because of their sexual orientation.

== Blood donation ==
Gay and bisexual men have been allowed to donate blood since 2001.

== LGBT rights groups and public campaigns ==
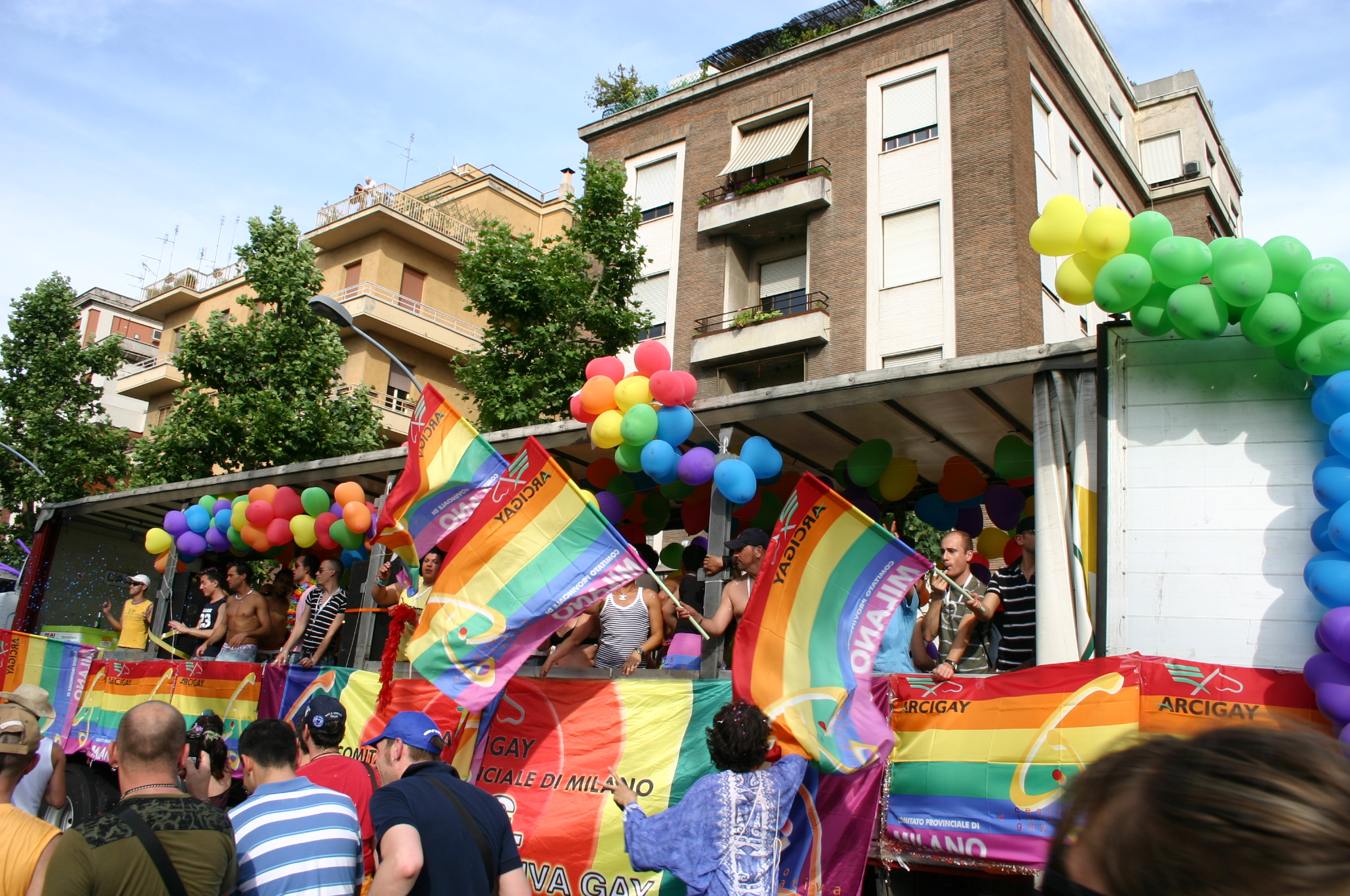
Arcigay's float at the 2007 Rome Gay Pride parade

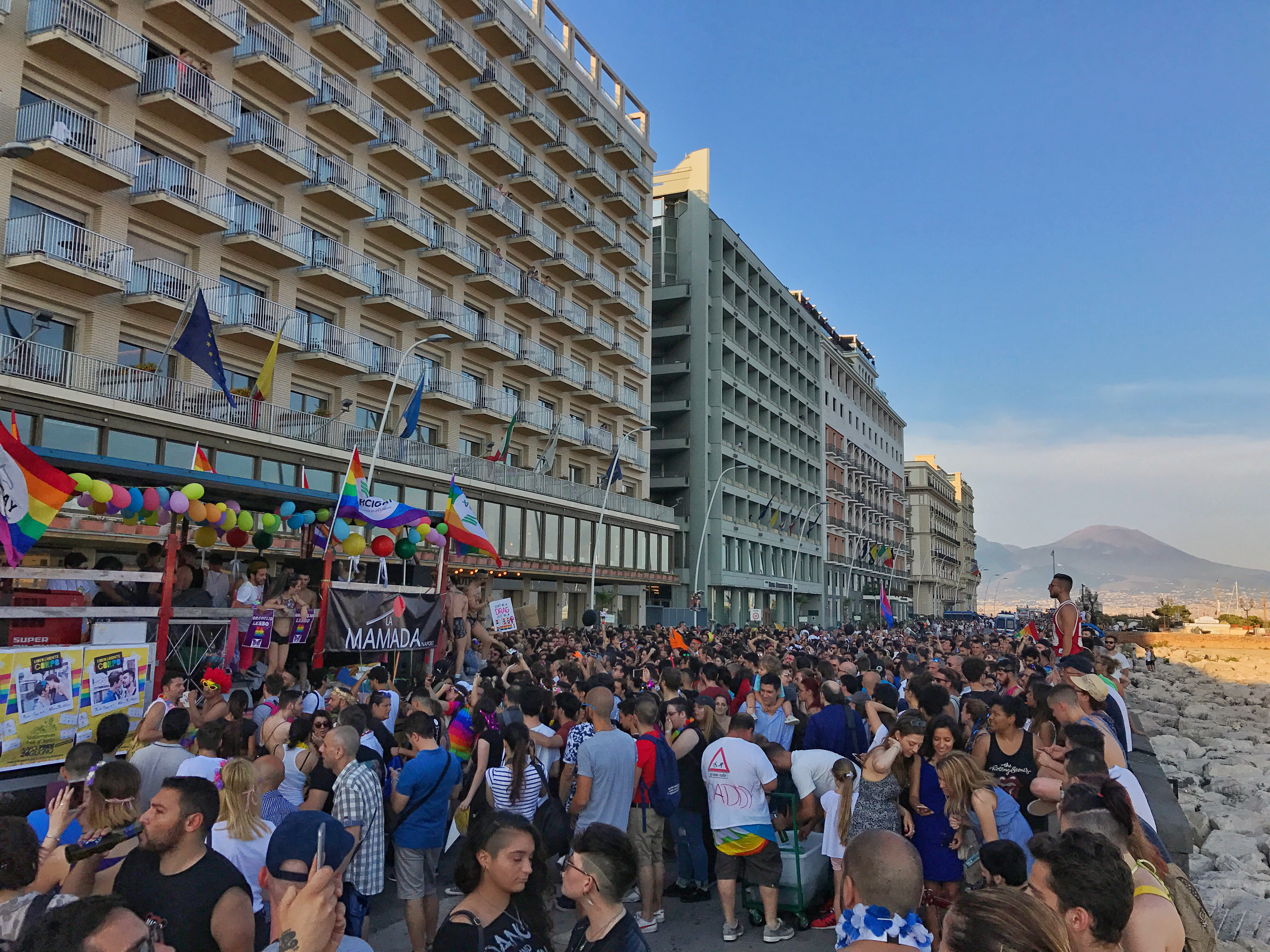
Participants at the 2017 Naples Pride parade

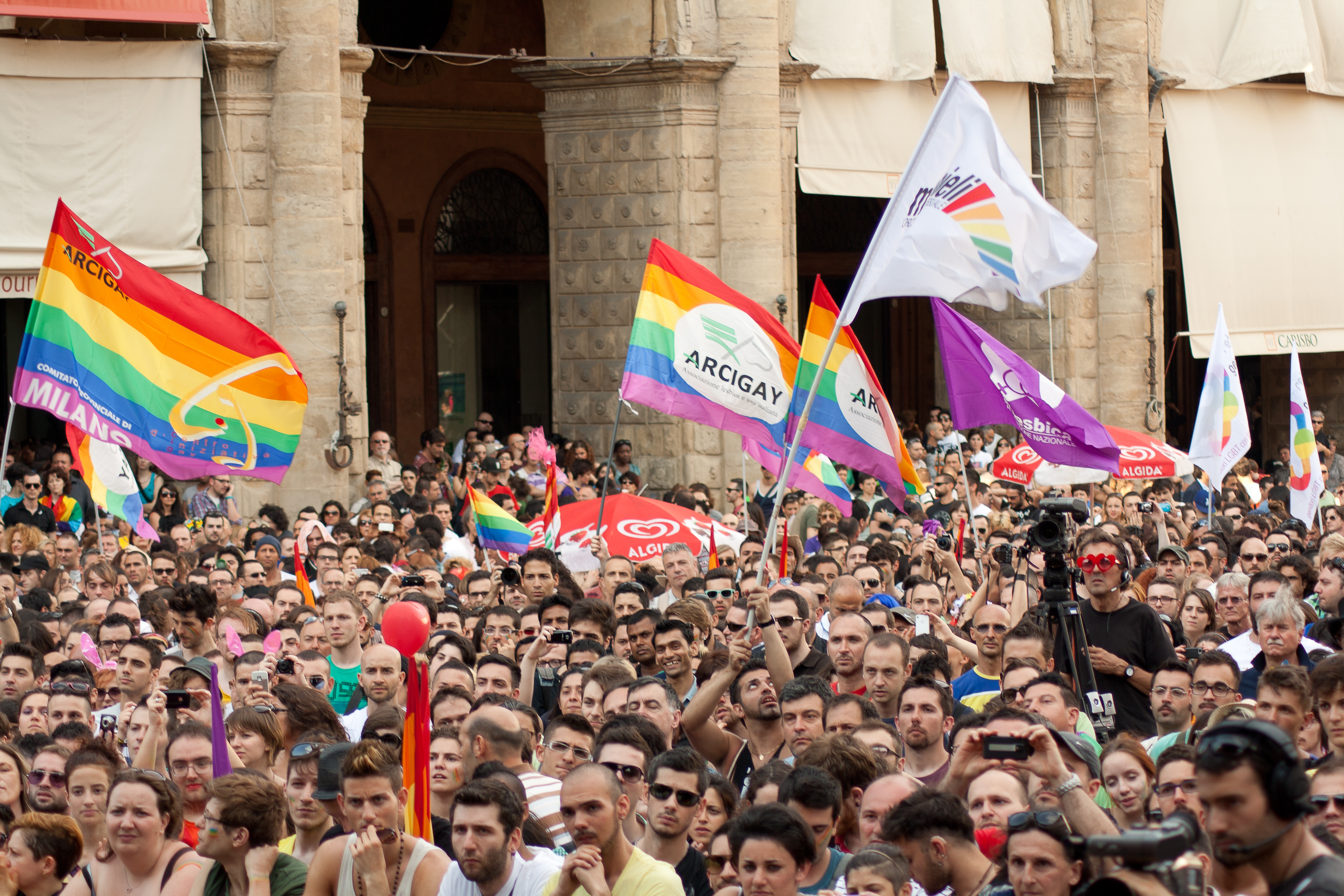
The 2012 edition of Bologna Pride

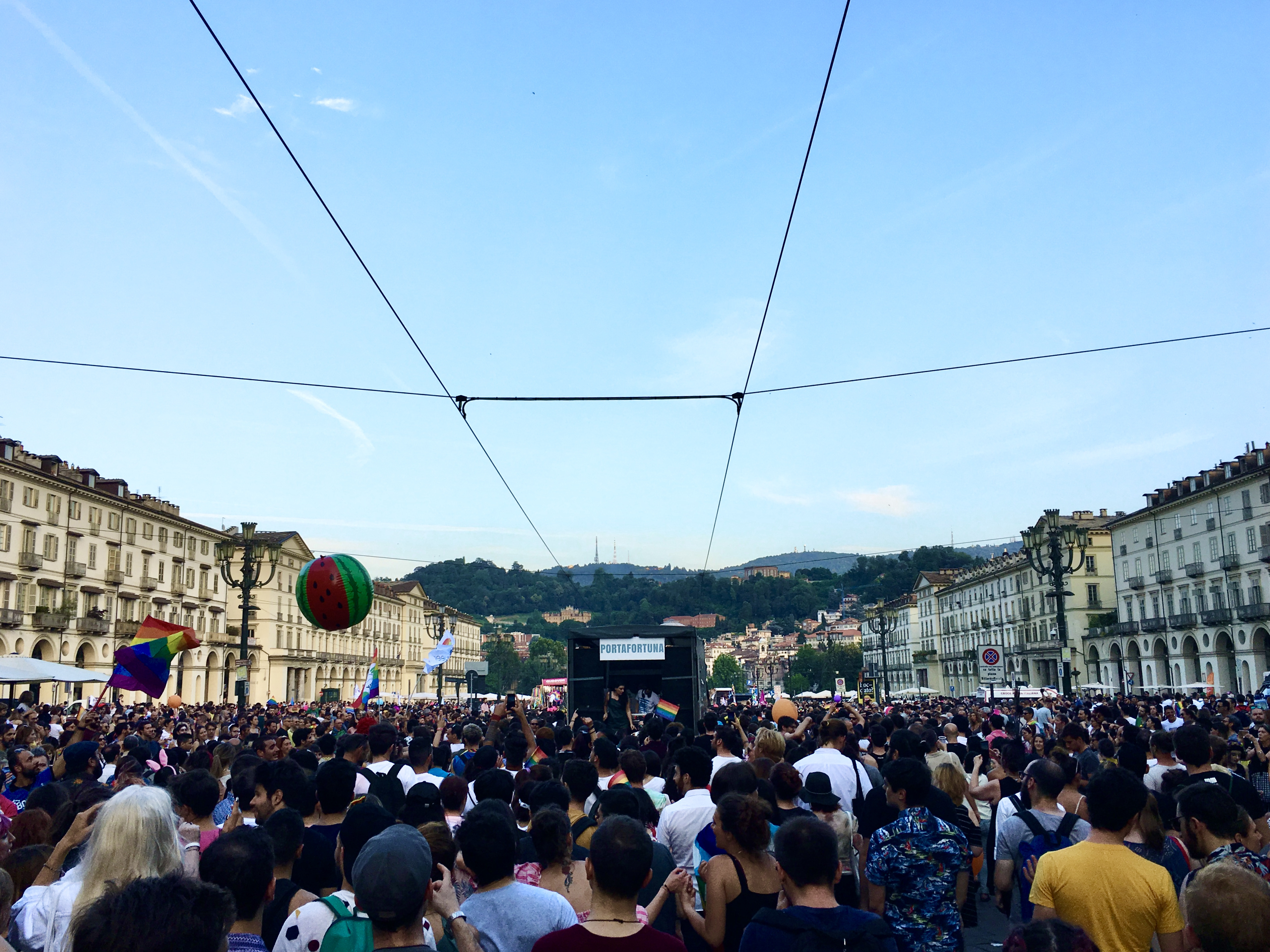
Pride revellers in Piazza Vittorio, Turin

The major national organization for LGBT rights in Italy is called Arcigay. It was founded in 1980, and has advocated for the recognition of same-sex couples and LGBT rights generally.

Some openly LGBT politicians include:

- Vladimir Luxuria, first openly transgender member of Parliament in Europe, and the world's second openly transgender MP after New Zealander Georgina Beyer; former deputy for the Communist Refoundation Party.
- Nichi Vendola, leader of Left Ecology Freedom and former President of Apulia.
- Rosario Crocetta, former President of Sicily and a prominent figure in the Democratic Party.
- Paola Concia, former member of the Chamber of Deputies for the Democratic Party.
- Daniele Capezzone, former spokesperson for the People of Freedom party.
- Franco Grillini, former member of the Chamber of Deputies for the Democrats of the Left.
- Marco Pannella, former member of the European Parliament and leader of the Italian Radical Party (came out after retirement).
- Alfonso Pecoraro Scanio, former Minister of Environment and first openly bisexual minister.
- Gianmarco Negri, mayor of Tromello, Province of Pavia and first transgender mayor in Italy.
- Elly Schlein, secretary of the Democratic Party (which is currently the largest opposition party in Parliament), openly bisexual woman and first openly LGBT leader of a major Italian party.

In 2007, an advert showing a baby wearing a wristband label that said "homosexual" caused controversy. The advert was part of a regional government campaign to combat anti-gay discrimination.

On 8 June 2019, the 25th edition of Roma Pride was held, with 700,000 people participating.

== Living conditions ==
Prevailing social attitudes about LGBT issues tend to reflect traditional Catholic values concerning human sexuality and gender roles, with lower support compared to other Western European states. In 2020 LGBT activist and legislator Alessandro Zan described homophobia as widespread and often emerging whenever LGBT people tried to live their lives openly. In June 2020 a man walking with his boyfriend in Pescara was violently attacked by seven individuals, leaving him with severe injuries requiring jaw reconstructive surgery. In September 2020 in Acerra a trans man was injured and his fiancée, a cisgender woman, was killed by the woman's brother who wanted to "teach her" a lesson and rammed their motorcycle with his car.

Pride parades celebrating LGBTQ achievements and community take place in more than 30 towns and cities across Italy from mid-May to the end of September. Turin hosted the conference of the European Pride Organizers Association in 2022, the first time for an Italian city.

A number of Italian cities are recognised as gay-friendly destinations, including Naples, Catania, Turin, Rome, Palermo, Cagliari, Milan, Noto, Bologna, Taormina and Gallipoli.

In May 2026, Italy's largest Catholic scout association, AGESCI, decided that sexual orientation and gender identity can no longer be used as reasons to exclude adults from leadership and educational roles. The decision came after three years of internal debate and represents an important change for the organization. AGESCI said that when assessing potential leaders, the focus should be on their suitability for the role and commitment to the association's values, rather than whether they are LGBT.

== Public opinion ==
Italians support for gay rights	2003	2009	2010	2013	2014	2015	2016	2019	2020	2021	2022	2023	2024	2025
same-sex civil unions	51.6%	58.9%	61.4%	77.2%	78.6%	64.4%	67.6%	65.1%	67.8%	64.4%	67.1%	64.1%	69.3%	80%
same-sex marriage	-	40.4%	41%	-	47.7%	40.8%	47.8%	50.9%	59.5%	58.4%	61.3%	59.2%	64.4%	66.8%
same-sex adoption	27%	19%	-	-	28.8%	27.8%	29%	31.1%	42%	44.3%	48.3%	50.4%	54.5%	63%

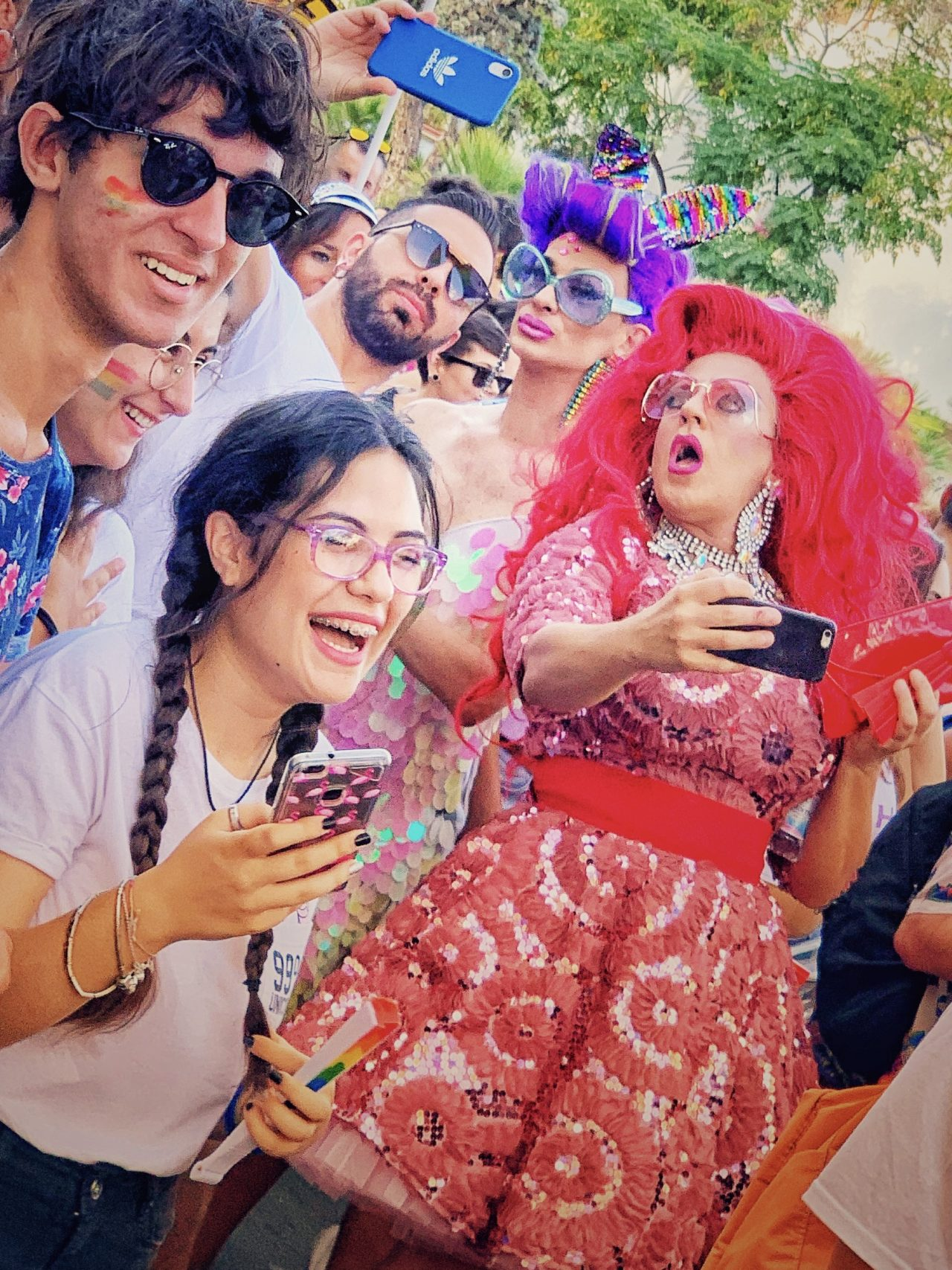
The 2019 edition of Salento Pride

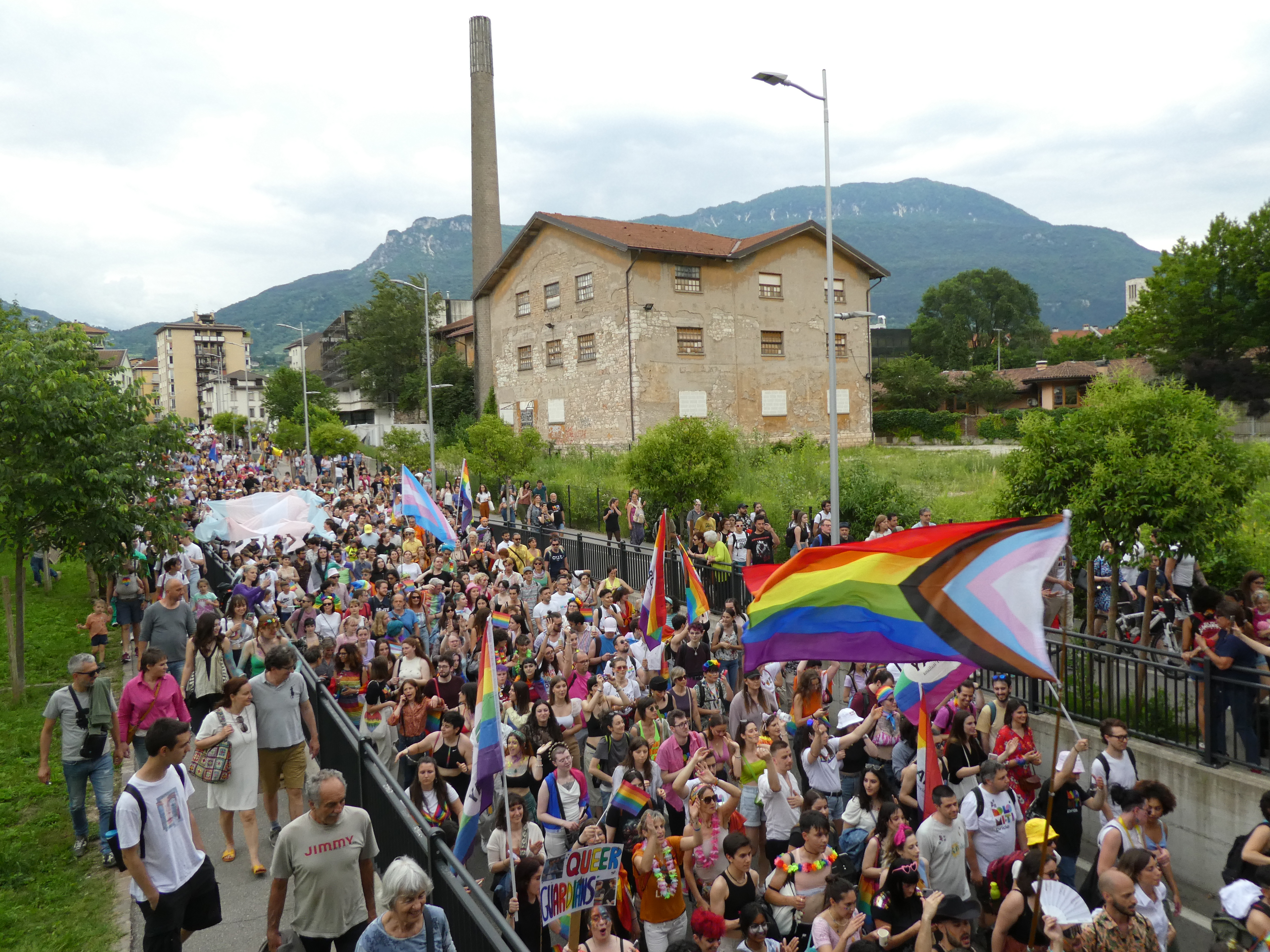
A Progress Pride flag at Dolomiti Pride in Trento. 2023

According to data from the 2010 Italy Eurispes report released 29 January, the percentage of Italians who have a positive attitude towards homosexuality and are in favor of legal recognition of gay and lesbian couples is growing.

According to a 2010 poll, 82% of Italians considered homosexuals equal to heterosexuals. 41% thought that same-sex couples should have the right to marry in a civil ceremony, and 20.4% agreed with civil unions only. In total, 61.4% were in favor of a form of legal recognition for gay and lesbian couples. This was an increase of 2.5% from the previous year (58.9%) and almost 10% in 7 years (51.6% in 2003). "This is further proof that Italians are ahead of their national institutions. Our Parliament hears more and more people on the issue and what it hears is to soon approve a law that guarantees gay people the opportunity to publicly recognize their families, as is done in 20 European countries," said the national president of Arcigay, Aurelio Mancuso.

A 2013 Pew Research Center opinion survey of various countries throughout the world showed that 74% of the Italian population believed that homosexuality should be accepted by society (the 8th highest of all the countries polled), while 18% believed it should not. Young people were generally more accepting: 86% of people between 18 and 29 were accepting of gay people, while 80% of people between 30 and 49 and 67% of people over 50 held the same belief. In a 2007 version of this survey, 65% of Italians were accepting of gay people, meaning that there was a net gain of 9% from 2007 to 2013 (the 4th highest gain in acceptance of gay people of the countries surveyed).

In December 2016, a survey was conducted by the Williams Institute in collaboration with IPSOS, in 23 countries (including Italy) on their attitudes towards transgender people. The study showed a relatively liberal attitude from Italians towards transgender people. According to the study, 78% of Italians supported allowing transgender people to change their gender on their legal documents (the 4th highest percentage of the countries surveyed), with 29% supporting the idea of allowing them to do so without any surgery or doctor's/government approval (the 6th highest percentage of the countries surveyed). In addition to that, 78.5% of Italians believed that transgender people should be legally protected from discrimination, 57.7% believed that transgender people should be allowed to use the restroom corresponding to their gender identity rather than their birth sex, and only 14.9% believed that transgender people have a mental illness (the 6th lowest of the countries surveyed).

According to Pew Research Center survey in 2015–17, 59% of Italians supported same-sex marriage, while 38% opposed. At 27%, young people aged between 18 and 34 were less likely than their elders to oppose legal gay marriage.

A survey conducted on Ipsos's Global Advisor online platform among more than 19,000 individuals in 27 countries between 23 April and 7 May 2021, found that 63% Italians aged between 18 and 74 believed that same-sex couples should be allowed to marry legally. This percentage was higher than that of some countries where, unlike in Italy, same-sex marriage is legal, such as Australia, France and United States.

A Pew Research Center poll conducted between February and May 2023 showed that 74% of Italians supported same-sex marriage and that 26% were opposed. When divided by political affiliation, support was highest among those on the left of the political spectrum at 88%, followed by those at the center at 74% and those on the right at 66%.

The 2023 Eurobarometer found that 69% of Italians thought same-sex marriage should be allowed throughout Europe, and 71% agreed that "there is nothing wrong in a sexual relationship between two persons of the same sex".

According to a 2025 Ipsos poll, a large majority of Italians (80%) favor the recognition of same-sex unions, while an Eurispes survey reports that 66.8% support same-sex marriage. In addition, 63% of Italians support adoption rights for same-sex couples.

The 2024 Eurispes Report on Italy indicates that public support for marriage equality has reached 64.5%, reflecting a rise of nearly 20 points over the past eight years. Approval of same-sex marriage has increased consistently, from 47.8% in 2016 to 50.9% in 2019, 58.4% in 2021, 59.2% in 2023, and 64.5% in 2024. The report also shows broad backing for legal recognition of unmarried couples regardless of gender, supported by 69.3% of respondents. While heterologous fertilization is accepted by a majority (60%), fewer Italians support surrogacy (37.1%) or the use of an artificial uterus (39.9%). Adoption by same-sex couples is approved by 54.5% of Italians, representing an increase of 23.4 percentage points since 2019. Adoption by single people receives even greater approval (61.5%). Furthermore, 58.4% of Italians support the legal recognition of children in same-sex families, including stepchild adoption and recognition of children born abroad through assisted reproduction or surrogacy.

== Summary table ==
Same-sex sexual activity legal	Yes (Since 1890)
Equal age of consent (14)	Yes (Since 1890)
Anti-discrimination laws in employment	Yes (Since 2003)
Anti-discrimination laws in the provision of goods and services	No / Yes (Applied only at a regional level in Tuscany, Piedmont, Liguria, Marche, Umbria, Sicily, Emilia-Romagna, Campania and Apulia)
Anti-discrimination laws in all other areas (incl. indirect discrimination, hate speech)	No / Yes (Applied only at a regional level in Tuscany, Piedmont, Liguria, Marche, Umbria, Sicily, Emilia-Romagna, Campania and Apulia; discriminatory language towards sexual minorities banned in street advertisement nationwide since 2021)
Anti-discrimination laws concerning gender identity	No / Yes (Applied only at a regional level in Tuscany, Piedmont, Liguria, Marche, Umbria, Sicily, Emilia-Romagna, Campania and Apulia; discriminatory language towards transgender people banned in street advertisement nationwide since 2021)
Same-sex marriage	No
Recognition of same-sex couples (e.g. civil unions)	Yes (Since 2016)
Stepchild adoption by same-sex couples	Yes (Since 2016)
Foster care by same-sex couples	Yes (Since 1983)
Joint adoption by same-sex couples	No / Yes (Since 2021 same-sex couples are allowed to have adoptions carried out abroad recognized in Italy, as confirmed by the Italian Court of Cassation)
Joint adoption of an adult by same-sex couples	Yes (Since 2026)
Single LGBT individual allowed to adopt	Yes (Since 2019 single individuals, regardless of whether or not they are LGBT, can adopt but only in particular circumstances. Since 2025, individuals in Italy, regardless of sexual orientation, can adopt foreign minors.)
Gender-neutral parental designation "genitori" (parents)	Yes (Since 2025)
Parental leave	Yes (Since 2025, the Constitutional Court ruled that non-biological mothers in same-sex couples are entitled to mandatory parental leave.
Gays, lesbians and bisexuals allowed to serve openly in the military	Yes (Since 2010)
Transgender people allowed to serve openly in the military	
Right to change legal gender	Yes (Since 1982)
Gender self-identification	No
Legal recognition of non-binary gender	No / Yes (Since 2024 non-binary individuals are constitutionally recognized in Italy, though legal gender registration remains limited to male or female, as ruled by the Constitutional Court.)
Sterilisation and sex reassignment surgery not required for the change of gender	Yes (Since 2015)
Conversion therapy banned on minors	No / Yes (Not banned by the law. However, the national psychological association officially stated in 2013 that conversion therapy goes strictly against its code of ethics and therefore is not allowed)
Conversion therapy banned on adults	No
Access to IVF for lesbians and automatic parenthood	No / Yes (Since 2025 lesbian couples can automatically register both as parents of children born through IVF abroad)
Commercial surrogacy for gay male couples	No (Banned for heterosexual couples as well)
Automatic parenthood on birth certificates for children of same-sex couples	No / Yes (Since 2025 for lesbian couples only)
Homosexuality declassified as an illness	Yes (Since 1990)
MSMs allowed to donate blood	Yes (Since 2001)
Protection for asylum seekers based on sexual orientation or gender identity	Yes (Since 2020)

== See also ==
- Human rights in Italy
- LGBTQ rights in Europe
- LGBTQ rights in the European Union
