= Ria Brodell =

American artist, educator and author

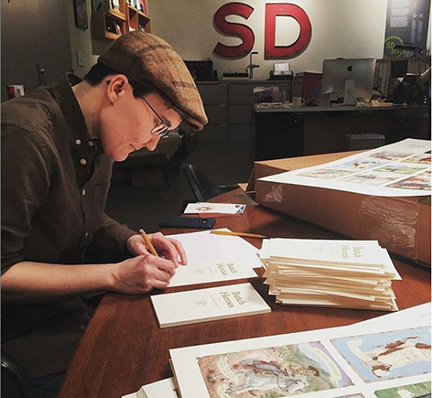
Artist Ria Brodell signing Butch Heroes box sets at Stoltze Design in Boston, MA for the Davis Museum at Wellesley College

Ria Brodell is an American artist, educator and author based in Boston.

== Early life and education ==
Brodell was born in Buffalo, New York and raised in Boise, Idaho. Brodell attended the School of the Art Institute of Chicago and received a BFA from Cornish College of the Arts in Seattle, WA and an MFA from the School of the Museum of Fine Arts at Tufts University in Boston, MA.

== Career ==
Brodell has had solo and group exhibitions throughout the United States, including the Cornell Fine Arts Museum, the Davis Museum at Wellesley College, the Minnesota Museum of American Art, the DeCordova Museum and Sculpture Park, the Museum of Fine Arts, Boston among others. Their work can be found in the collections of the Cornell Fine Arts Museum in Winter Park, Florida; the Minnesota Museum of American Art in St. Paul, Minnesota; the Henry Art Gallery in Seattle, Washington; the Leslie-Lohman Museum of Gay and Lesbian Art in New York City; the Davis Museum at Wellesley College; the Bernard A. Zuckerman Museum of Art, Kennesaw, Georgia; and the Mary Alice Cooley Print Collection at Cornish College of the Arts, Seattle. Brodell's work has appeared in The Guardian, ARTnews, The Boston Globe, The Cut, New American Paintings, and Art New England. Brodell's book documenting their painting series Butch Heroes was released in 2018 by MIT Press.

Brodell teaches college-level studio art. Brodell has noted that teaching and making art requires a certain set of problem-solving skills. It allows them to demonstrate techniques they have used first hand when approaching their subjects for the “Butch Heroes” series. Brodell enjoys experiencing their students’ expression and the interactions they have as a professor. Brodell found it particularly moving to interact with those students in the LGBTQIA+ community, “Those exchanges of information and mutual moments of discovery are some of the most exciting aspects of teaching.”

== Artworks ==
=== The Handsome and the Holy ===
The Handsome and The Holy is a series of self-portraits and vignettes by Ria Brodell made from 2008 to 2010. The works in this series were painted with gouache on paper. In this series the artist attempted to bring together seemingly contradictory aspects of their childhood- queer sexuality, struggles with gender identity, family and Catholicism. In a Q&A article written by Jess T. Dugan for Strange Fire, Brodell states, "The Handsome and the Holy was the first time I tried to tackle the subject of my gender identity, sexuality and Catholic upbringing through painting. In that series I was reaching back to my childhood. As a kid, part of me knew that something was "queer" about who I was attracted to, and who I wanted to be (Cary Grant, Ken, the Prince in all the Disney movies), but I didn't have the language or the knowledge to understand what that meant. The way I wanted to express my gender (in the most masculine ways possible) did not mesh well with having to wear a little plaid skirt to school."

In the creation of The Handsome and the Holy, Brodell says they would choose comforting figures such as a guardian angel, or even "the story of St. Anthony helping me to find GI Joe's lost gun, etc", in order to allow them to express their "queer desire" and as an avenue to "embody masculine figures" that they enjoyed.

Like The Handsome and the Holy, the Butch Heroes series seeks to depict role models and possible heroes throughout history that were gender nonconforming and tell their stories. Brodell does this through the style of Catholic holy cards - intricate depictions of saints or martyrs that tell a visual story and are meant for "private, portable devotions." Both of these series deal with Brodell's Catholic upbringing "'in relationship to [their] gender and sexuality and coming out and coming to terms with all that,' said Brodell…" in their book, Butch Heroes. In the book titled We Are Everywhere by Matthew Reimer it says, "The strong sister told the strong brother that there were two important things to remember about coming revolutions… The first is that we will get our asses kicked and the second is that we will win." It is here that Ria Brodell is winning and giving others hope and a chance to win as well.

==== Self-Portrait as a Nun or a Monk, ca. 1250 ====
This piece is a work from their series The Handsome and the Holy and was painted in 2010. It contains two self-representative images: one of a nun, and one of a monk. This piece was exhibited in Brodell's first solo museum exhibition, Devotion, at the Cornell Fine Arts Museum from January to May 2018. It was exhibited alongside other pieces from their series The Handsome and the Holy and Butch Heroes. This work led them to research queer historical figures that were assigned female at birth, but masculine presenting, and eventually to pursue the well-known Butch Heroes series. Brodell discusses their shift from self-portraits to historical storytelling in an interview in 2016:

...the act of making those portraits got me thinking about history. Specifically, how did we survive? How did queer people in the past live their lives? I knew that Catholicism suggested "homosexuals" enter a life of service or at the very least live a life of chastity (I looked that up in the catechism book when I was in high school), so thinking of my options in the past, I made, Self Portrait as a Nun or Monk, circa 1250. After that self-portrait, I decided to dive into history and try to find the stories of real people.

"Self-Portrait as a Nun or a Monk, ca. 1250" is a self-reflection and an inquiry into the history of queer bodies and their treatment. This painting is a statement on the criminalization and condemnation of queer people and a look into lives of the past. It is a bridge between these two series and between the inner reflection and external realities of the past and present world.

=== Butch Heroes ===
Ria Brodell's most popular series, Butch Heroes, began in 2010 following the making of their work Self Portrait as a Nun or a Monk, circa 1250. Brodell began the process by wondering what their life would have been like had they been born in a different century. In creating the Butch Heroes series, Brodell paints images that remain true to Catholic holy cards by centering "the featured individual or couple" and including "details of symbolic significance, such as a location" or a meaningful object. The works in this series all follow a similar style with the use of "bright and contrasting colors" alongside "bold designs" to capture the audience's attention. All of the paintings also include a gold banner with the "name(s) and date(s) associated with the subject(s)". Some of the many people included in this series include Katherina Hetzeldorfer, Lisbetha Olsdotter, and Okuhara Seiko.

The paintings depict, "people who were assigned female at birth, had documented relationships with women, and whose gender presentation was more masculine than feminine." Brodell explains,"Some of the subjects identified as women, others as men; some shifted between gender presentations throughout their lives, while others embodied both simultaneously." Original and secondary sources, including newspaper articles, and personal journal entries are used to verify the information. Summarized narratives and research sources are included with each portrait so that others can do further research. The paintings are created in the style of Catholic holy cards as an homage to Brodell's Catholic upbringing. Brodell explains the use of the holy card format:

Using the format of the Catholic holy card was a personal and logical stylistic choice for me. I still have a collection of holy cards that belonged to my late aunt. I loved going through the collection with her and hearing her tell the stories of the saints. They are beautiful, intimate objects. They're also handed out at funerals to help honor deceased family members, used to commemorate special events, or even just exchanged between friends and family as kindly gestures. When I was a child the saints depicted on the holy cards were presented to me as role models. They are figures from church history that are revered, one is meant to look to them for guidance or to help find peace. For me, this format is a perfect (subversive) way to present the lives of people who were long forgotten and abused during their lifetime, especially because so many of them were accused of "mocking God and His order" or deceiving their fellow Christians.

Brodell views the project as an ongoing effort to reclaim and document the history of LGBTQIA community. The Butch Heroes paintings were first exhibited in March–April 2017 at Gallery Kayafas in Boston. Images of the paintings, accompanying narratives and source material were published by the artist as a limited edition book, Butch Heroes: Paintings by Ria Brodell, in conjunction with the exhibition. In February 2018, the Davis Museum at Wellesley College released a limited edition Butch Heroes boxed card set. In October 2018 the MIT Press version, Butch Heroes, was released with additional paintings and narratives.

Since its release the book has been described as "an ambitious and wonderfully celebratory ode to the lives of 28 people over many centuries 'assigned female at birth' who 'had documented relationships with women, and whose gender presentation was more masculine than feminine... This is a serious—and seriously successful—queer history recovery project." "Butch Heroes is a fascinating, intersectional, feminist art-text project, and overall a rather wonderful reclamatory book of LGBT history that subvert and resonates in the human psyche." "The portraits give homage to contemporary ideas of queer ancestry, and in doing so give strength to trans and non-binary communities currently under attack. That makes Butch Heroes worth celebrating."

=== Catterina Vizzani ===
Catterina Vizzani is one of the individuals included in Butch Heroes. He was born in Rome, and later began dressing in masculine clothing, and changed his name to Giovanni Bordoni. Giovanni attempted running away with the local minister's niece, whom he had a romantic connection with, but was captured and shot in the left thigh. The injury caused a fatal infection, causing his death which led to his organs being dissected to understand his sexuality.

=== Agatha Dietschi ===
Agatha Dietschi is one of the newest individuals that was included in Brodell’s “Butch Heroes” series and in their second book “More Butch Heroes”. They were born in the village of Wehingen, Germany. Dietschi migrated to the Danube Valley in Germany, working as a farm laborer. Dietschi, who was assigned female at birth transitioned to a man, taking the name Hans Kaiser. Kaiser was married three times in their life, to one man and two women. One of the women Kaiser married had children but vanished when Kaiser left the village, so Kaiser declared them dead upon their return. The other woman, Anna Reuli, who was also a former laborer, was happily married to Kaiser and they were a model couple. Reuli, who was unaware that Kaiser was trans, discovered this and attempted to convince Kaiser to return to living as Agatha. Kaiser refused, declaring that he could not “live as a woman or love a man.” Despite this new development in their relationship both Kaiser and Reuli continued to stay married for eight years. Reuli later met a man named Marx Gross. The introduction of Gross heated the relationship between Kaiser and Reuli, resulting in Reuli and Gross threatening Kaiser in order to secure a divorce. This decision didn’t work so Reuli exposed that Kaiser was assigned female at birth, which promptly led them to a trial. By the end of the trial, Kaiser received the sentence of banishment from the village. This sentence was considered light as those who were found taking on a different gender identity from that assigned at birth or those engaging in same-sex relations were often executed. A similar case in Europe occurred a decade before Kaiser’s case where the individual was drowned, 1477.

=== Kingdom Animalia ===
The Kingdom Animalia Project is a series of artwork made by artist Ria Brodell from December 15, 2015, through March 1, 2017. By drawing a different animal every day, Brodell was able to gain insight into "the magnitude of animal species around the world." In a 2016 interview with Jess Dugan, Brodell explained that this project stemmed from their "strong interest in animal rights and conservation" and by July 2016, the series contained over 200 pieces. Brodell also mentioned that this project allowed them to continually practice drawing and to focus mentally. Some of the many species that Brodell drew include a variety of different insects, reptiles, birds, sea creatures, and mammals. The works in this project are completed on small pieces of paper using colored pencils or gouache for the main subject and watercolor to create vibrant colored backgrounds. In a 2018 interview with Ellen Caldwell, Brodell was asked if there were any connections between Kingdom Animalia and other works such as Butch Heroes or The Distant Lands, considering that Kingdom Animalia was significantly different both artistically and stylistically. Brodell mentioned that despite the differences the overarching connection between those works was their "desire to make work that addresses subjects that [they] feel strongly about."

=== The Distant Lands ===
The Distant Lands is a series of sculptures, paintings and drawings made by artist Ria Brodell from 2004 to 2008. Brodell was able to create unique works of art with eccentric creatures in peculiar settings. Through the act of observation, they created their drawings to depict the characteristics of the creatures they discovered, in addition to the perceived creatures' behaviors. Brodell was interviewed by Ellen Caldwell in 2018, where Brodell shared that their interest for this series (along with their other series Kingdom Animalia) was a basic interest of "animals and conservation". Brodell states they are the only explorer of these boundless locations; therefore, their artwork is their execution of their experiences from observing the creatures that solely inhabit the uncolonized lands. The collection of creatures includes Wormbunnies (social communal animals), the Whale and his friend submarine (go on adventures), the birdmen (manipulative), the Sodmonsters and the Clumps (unappeasable and temperamental).

== Honors and awards ==
Brodell is a recipient of an Artadia Award, a Massachusetts Cultural Council Artist Fellowship and an SMFA Traveling Fellowship.

Butch Heroes was a finalist for the 2019 Lambda Literary Award in LGBTQ Non-Fiction.

== Personal life ==
Brodell is non-binary and transgender. They use they/them pronouns. While Catholicism was an important, "comforting" part of their childhood, as they grew older, Brodell states that "I don't consider myself Catholic anymore," further continuing with "When I got older and I realized how the church felt about me and how they wanted me to live my life, "I don't know if I was angry or disappointed. Putting these people on holy cards that I identify with, it's a subversive way to replace those role models that that Catholic Church gave me with people I actually identify with."
