= Arcigay =

Italian non-profit LGBTI organization

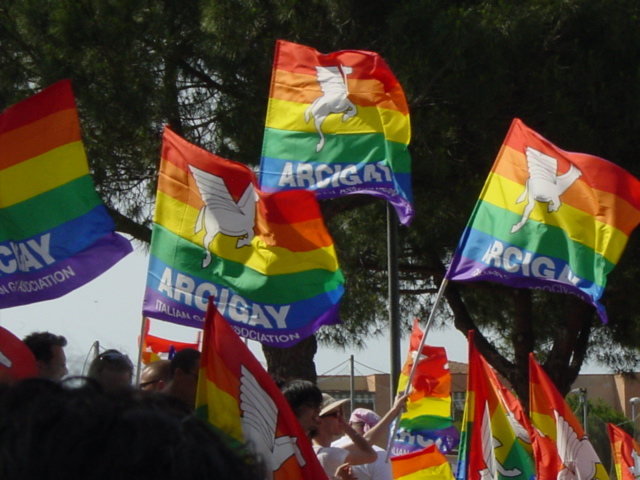
- Flags of Arcigay on national Gay Pride 2004
- Named after: ARCI
- Founded: 9 December 1980 (45 years ago) in Palermo
- Founder: Marco Bisceglia
- Type: Gay rights
- Headquarters: Bologna, Italy
- Location: Bologna, Italy
- President: Natascia Maesi
- Secretary: Gabriele Piazzoni
- Key people: Franco Grillini, Nichi Vendola
- Main organ: Congress
- Affiliations: ILGA, ILGA Europe, IGLYO, TGEU, ALDA, Aids Action Europe
- Website: www.arcigay.it

Arcigay (Italian pronunciation: [artʃiˈɡɛi]) is Italy's first and largest worldwide gay organisation. The association was first founded as a local association in Palermo in 1980, then nationally established in Bologna in 1985. The organisation became known throughout Italy for its campaign for civil unions. The current president of Arcigay is Natascia Maesi, the first woman leading Arcigay since its creation. The secretary is Gabriele Piazzoni. Franco Grillini, a historical figure and previous president of Arcigay, is now honorary president.

From its creation to the present, Arcigay has welcomed the birth of many subsidiary associations in Italy's various realities, and there are now several dozen territorial communities, often bounded by the territories of Italian provinces. Founder and president of the territorial committee of the Province of Imperia is the Italian mathematician Marco Antei.

Arcigay has often protested against the Vatican's opposition to homosexuality and LGBT rights.

== History ==
=== The creation of Arcigay ===
The first nucleus of what later became Arcigay was formed in Palermo on 9 December 1980, as ARCI Gay, partly on the emotional wave of a demonstration organized in Giarre for a crime that had occurred about two months earlier. Two young men, Giorgio Agatino Giammona and Antonio Galatola, were killed on 17 October with a bullet each in the head for being gay. Although the crime remained officially unsolved, the culprit has been widely believed to be Antonio's 13-year-old nephew, either following order from other family members or forced by the two themselves in order to escape the "shame" that their condition as homosexuals procured.

After Palermo in many other cities in Italy, people started to reunite in small groups. Nonetheless, the national association to which everyone referred did not yet exist as an independent entity, but referred to the ARCI association which grouped together various Italian cultural entities and for the first time gave space to issues pertaining to the homosexual world. Among the first leaders of those movements, we need to mention Massimo Milani, Gino Campanella and Marco Bisceglia, the latter being a priest who was already an adherent of so-called liberation theology, a homosexual himself and a forerunner of gay marriage in Italy, having celebrated in 1975 a so-called "union of conscience" religious union between two men. This caused the priest a suspension from his Catholic Church.

In 1982, again in Palermo, a national meeting of ARCI Gay was held, considered the association's first congress in that it was attended by the national leadership of the ARCI; two years later ARCI Gay posed the problem of institutionalizing and stabilizing its presence throughout the country, which led to the first constituent summit held in late 1984.

== Organisation ==
Arcigay is divided into several subsidiary associations scattered throughout Italy. Here we present the list updated to 2022:

- Ancona - Arcigay Comunitas Ancona - Comitato Territoriale Arcigay
- Aosta - Arcigay Valle d'Aosta Queer VdA - Comitato Territoriale Arcigay
- Arezzo - Arcigay Arezzo "Chimera Arcobaleno" - Comitato territoriale Arcigay
- Asti - Love is Love - Associazione Aderente Arcigay
- Avellino - Avellino - Associazione Aderente Arcigay
- Bari - Arcigay Bari "L'arcobaleno del Levante" - Comitato territoriale Arcigay
- Barletta-Andria-Trani - Arcigay Bat "Le Mine Vaganti" - Comitato territoriale Arcigay
- Bergamo - Arcigay Bergamo "Cives" - Comitato territoriale Arcigay
- Bologna - Cassero LGBT Center - Comitato territoriale Arcigay
- Bolzano - Centaurus Arcigay dell'Alto Adige Südtirol - Comitato territoriale Arcigay
- Brescia - Arcigay Orlando Brescia APS - Comitato territoriale Arcigay
- Campania - Arcigay Campania - Coordinamento Regionale Arcigay
- Caserta - Rain Arcigay Caserta - Comitato territoriale Arcigay
- Castelli Romani - Castelli Romani - Associazione Aderente Arcigay
- Catania - Arcigay Pegaso Catania - Comitato territoriale Arcigay
- Chieti - Arcigay Chieti - Sylvia Rivera - Comitato territoriale Arcigay
- Como - Arcigay Como - Comitato Territoriale Arcigay
- Cosenza - Arcigay EOS Cosenza - Comitato territoriale Arcigay
- Cremona - Arcigay Cremona "La Rocca" - Comitato territoriale Arcigay
- Cuneo - Arcigay "Granda Queer" Cuneo - Comitato territoriale Arcigay
- Ferrara - Arcigay Ferrara - Comitato territoriale Arcigay
- Florence - Arcigay Firenze Altre Sponde - Comitato Territoriale Arcigay
- Foggia - Arcigay Foggia "Le Bigotte" - Comitato territoriale Arcigay
- Frosinone - Frosinone - Comitato Territoriale Arcigay
- Genova - Arcigay Genova - Approdo Lilia Mulas A.P.S. - Comitato territoriale Arcigay
- Imperia - M.I.A. Arcigay Imperia. Comitato territoriale Arcigay
- L'Aquila - Arcigay "Massimo Consoli" L'Aquila - Comitato territoriale Arcigay
- Latina - SEIcomeSEI - Comitato territoriale Arcigay
- Le fate ignoranti - Le fate ignoranti - Associazione Aderente Arcigay
- Lecce - Arcigay Salento - Comitato territoriale Arcigay
- Livorno - L.E.D. Libertà e Diritti - Comitato territoriale Arcigay
- Mantova - Arcigay "La Salamandra" Mantova - Comitato territoriale Arcigay
- Messina - Arcigay "Makwan" Messina - Comitato territoriale Arcigay
- Milan - Centro d’Iniziativa Gay - Comitato territoriale Arcigay
- Modena - Arcigay Modena "Matthew Shepard" (ODV) - Comitato territoriale Arcigay
- Molise - Arcigay Molise "Lambda Identità Libere" - Comitato Territoriale Arcigay
- Naples - Arcigay "Antinoo" Napoli - Comitato territoriale Arcigay
- Padova - Arcigay Tralaltro Padova - Comitato territoriale Arcigay
- Palermo - Arcigay Palermo - Comitato territoriale Arcigay
- Pavia - Coming-Aut LGBTI+ Community Center - Arcigay Pavia - Comitato territoriale Arcigay
- Pesaro Urbino - Arcigay Agorà - Comitato territoriale Arcigay
- Pescara - Mazì - Comitato Territoriale Arcigay
- Piacenza - Arcigay Piacenza Lambda - Comitato territoriale Arcigay
- Pisa - Pinkriot Arcigay Pisa - Comitato territoriale Arcigay
- Potenza - Arcigay Basilicata "Marco Bisceglia" - Comitato territoriale Arcigay
- Prato Pistoia - Arcigay Prato Pistoia l'Asterisco - Comitato territoriale Arcigay
- Ragusa - Arcigay Ragusa - Comitato territoriale Arcigay
- Ravenna - Arcigay Ravenna Elio Venturi - Comitato territoriale Arcigay
- Reggio Calabria - Arcigay IDM "I Due Mari", Reggio Calabria - Comitato territoriale Arcigay
- Reggio Emilia - Arcigay Reggio Emilia "Gioconda" - Comitato territoriale Arcigay
- Rieti - Rieti LGBT+ - Comitato Territoriale Arcigay
- Rimini - Arcigay Rimini "Alan Turing" - Comitato territoriale Arcigay
- Rome - Arcigay Roma Gruppo Ora - Comitato territoriale Arcigay
- Roma - Divine Ostia - Associazione Aderente Arcigay
- Rovigo - Arcigay Rovigo "Politropia" - Comitato territoriale Arcigay
- Salerno - Arcigay "Marcella di Folco" Salerno - Comitato territoriale Arcigay
- Savona - Arcigay Savona "APERTAMENTE" - Comitato territoriale Arcigay
- Siena - Movimento Pansessuale APS - Comitato Territoriale Arcigay
- Siracusa - Arcigay Siracusa - Comitato territoriale Arcigay
- Taranto - Stambopoli - Comitato Territoriale Arcigay
- Teramo - Arcigay Teramo - Associazione Aderente Arcigay
- Turin - Arcigay Torino "Ottavio Mai" - Comitato territoriale Arcigay
- Torino - Casa Arcobaleno Torino - Associazione Aderente Arcigay
- Trento - Arcigay del Trentino - Comitato territoriale Arcigay
- Trieste - Arcigay Arcobaleno ODV Trieste Gorizia - Comitato territoriale Arcigay
- Udine - Arcigay Friuli ODV - Comitato territoriale Arcigay
- Varese - Arcigay Varese - Comitato territoriale Arcigay
- Verbania - Arcigay Nuovi Colori ONLUS - Comitato territoriale Arcigay
- Vercelli - Arcigay Rainbow Vercelli - Valsesia - Comitato territoriale Arcigay
- Verona - Pianeta Milk - Verona Lgbt* Center - Arcigay/Arci - Comitato territoriale Arcigay
- Vicenza - Arcigay Vicenza APS - Comitato territoriale Arcigay
- Viterbo - Viterbo - Associazione Aderente Arcigay

== See also ==
- LGBT rights in Italy
- List of LGBT rights organisations
