= Angelo Tartaglia =

Italian condottiero and nobleman

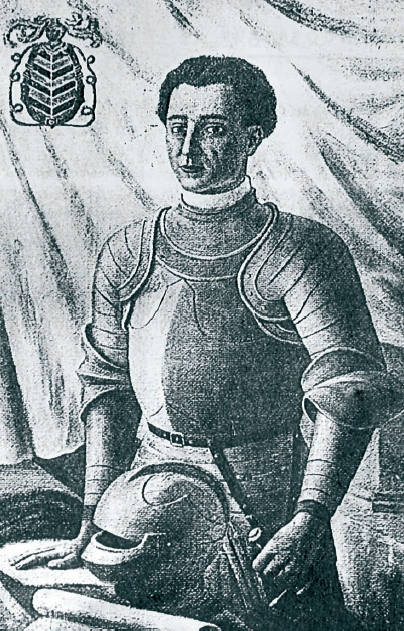
Angelo Tartaglia

Angelo Tartaglia, also known as Angelo Broglio da Lavello (1350 or 1370–1421), was an Italian condottiero and nobleman. Tartaglia served as a captain of the Papal Army beginning in 1415, and was lord of Lavello, Toscanella, Tarquinia, Canino, Acquapendente, Montalto di Castro, Marta, Civitella d’Agliano, Sipicciano, Gradoli, and Sutri.

== Biography ==
Born in Lavello, in either 1370 or, according to his son Gaspare writing in the Cronaca Malatestiana del secolo XV , as an illegitimate son of Raimondo Orsini del Balzo in 1350. Tartaglia was later adopted by Lord Andrea da Lavello, who he succeeded as lord of Lavello in 1406.

Tartaglia trained at the military school of Ceccolo Broglia and served the Republic of Florence. On 26 June 1402, he fought in the Battle of Casalecchio; he was charged with overseeing the bridge of Reno, but he left his position to participate in the combat, leaving the camps without any defence on his side. His imprudence cost the defeat of his army, and Tartaglia was captured and imprisoned.

Released, he assumed responsibility for the defeat, but not enough to appease the wrath of Muzio Attendolo Sforza, with whom he developed a strong rivalry. In 1408, he fought in the service of Ladislaus of Naples, defending Perugia and Civitavecchia from the assaults of Braccio da Montone and conquering Rome, scaring away the antipope John XXIII.

As a token of gratitude, Ladislaus gave him the title of Lord of Toscanella in 1413. In 1418, he swore allegiance to Pope Martin V and occupied Assisi one year later and other territories between Lazio and Umbria.

=== Death ===
In October of 1421, Tartaglia was accused by rival Muzio Attendolo Sforza of treason and conspiring with Alfonso V of Aragon and Braccio da Montone. Based on this accusation, Pope Martin V ordered his arrest. Tartaglia was captured in his sleep at Aversa, tortured, and executed by decapitation.

== Bibliography ==
- Antonio Di Chicco, Il condottiero Angelo Tartaglia di Lavello, nel primo Ventennio del sec. XV, Lavello, Tip. Finiguerra, 1957; nuova edizione TARSIA di Melfi, 1990.
- Patrizia Chiatti, La biografia del condottiero Angelo Tartaglia (1370-1421), Edizioni Penne & Papiri, Tuscania, 2011.
