= Catharina Margaretha Linck =

Prussian woman who presented as a man

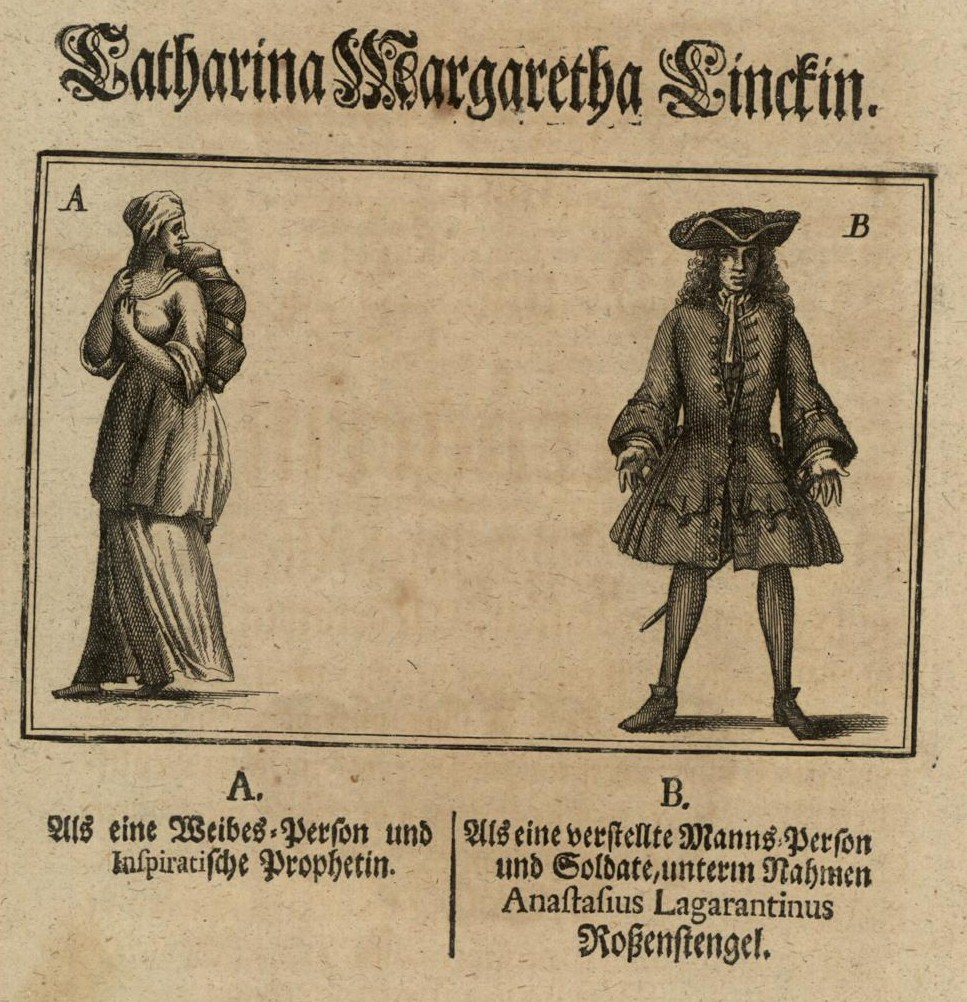
1720 drawing of Linck/Rosenstengel in both feminine and masculine clothing

Catharina Margaretha Linck (died 1721) was a Prussian woman who presented as a man for the majority of her adult life. Linck married a woman and, based on their sexual activity together, was convicted of sodomy and executed by order of King Frederick William I in 1721. Linck's execution was the last for lesbian sexual activity in Europe and an anomaly for its time.

This article is only based on Brigitte Ericsson's translation of Franz Carl Müller's publication (1891) of some parts of Linck's courtfiles.

== Background ==
The only source of information available in English about Linck is a court document dated 13 October 1721. It summarizes the testimony taken at the trial of Linck and Linck’s wife, and reviews possible punishments for consideration by the monarch. Scholars of the period characterize her as a lesbian and place Linck in a social context in which women adopted male attire for a variety of reasons, including "to involve themselves sexually with another woman, either with or without the other woman's knowledge".

== Life ==
Linck was born the illegitimate child of a widow, and grew up in an orphanage in Halle. According to Linck’s mother's testimony, after leaving the orphanage at age 14, and learning to work in the cloth and button-making trades, Linck, "[i]n order to lead a life of chastity ... disguised herself in men's clothes" and then spent some years with an unorthodox religious group called the "Inspirants", likely a form of Quakers. Linck next served three years in the Hanoverian Army until she deserted in 1708. When she was apprehended, Linck escaped hanging "when she disclosed her sex", submitting to an examination by someone identified as Professor Francken. Linck then served in the armed forces of Prussia until a letter from Francken revealed that Linck was a woman. Dismissed from military service, Linck returned to Halle and lived for a summer as a woman. She then joined a Polish garrison and, next, the forces of Hesse, using several more male aliases and deserting from the service both times. Linck returned again to Halle and worked in the cloth trade for several years, sometimes supervising several women, "sometimes wearing female, sometimes male clothing". She was arrested, presumably for the earlier desertion, but was again released "because of Professor Francken and his disclosure of her femaleness", though only after a physical examination by authorities at the town hall.

In 1717, having adopted men's clothing once more and begun representing herself as a man named Anastasius Lagrantius Rosenstengel, Linck met and married 18-year-old Catharina Margaretha Mühlhahn at Halberstadt. The court records detail their sexual activities. Linck "had made a penis of stuffed leather ... and had tied it to her pubes with a leather strap. When she went to bed with her alleged [sic] wife she put this leather object into the other's body and in this way had actually accomplished intercourse." Linck claimed to have performed similar acts with women she hired while she was a soldier. Linck testified to experiencing great excitement during intercourse: "whenever she was at the height of her passion, she felt tingling in her veins, arms, and legs". The marriage was unsettled, with Mühlhahn's mother at times trying to separate the couple. Linck earned money through begging, and sometimes relocating to seek charitable support, was baptized a Catholic and then received baptism as a Lutheran. The trial record says that in a final confrontation Mühlhahn's mother "charged the defendant with being a woman and not a man", "ripped open her pants, examined her, and ... found not the slightest sign of anything masculine". Mühlhahn's mother provided the authorities with the artificial penis, along with a "leather-covered horn" that Linck wore next to her body and that allowed her to urinate while standing up.

In court, Linck and Mühlhahn disputed whether Mühlhahn fully understood how their intercourse was accomplished. Mühlhahn in her testimony detailed how Linck had "tortured and tormented her" in attempting intercourse. She said that her questions about the way Linck urinated had been met with abusive comments and threats of violence. She described examining Linck's anatomy once in 1717 while she slept and discovering that "he was fashioned exactly like herself". This gave her an advantage over Linck, who begged her not to notify the authorities, and proposed that they live together as brother and sister.

Linck admitted to sodomy on account of having been "deluded by Satan," but denied making Mühlhahn suffer. The marriage to Mühlhahn was the work of other forces, Linck claimed, since Satan had tracked her since birth. As for the additional charges, Linck claimed that the wearing of men's clothes was forbidden for married women but not for the unmarried; that she had suffered for the desertions and had "spent weeks in chains and fetters" while under arrest; and excused her multiple baptisms as motivated by new covenants with God. In sum:

Whether Linck had committed an offense she did not know; she confessed and repented the sins; she deserved death tenfold; however, even if she were done away with, others like her would remain. Linck did not know what else to offer as an excuse; she had committed sins against God and was quite willing to die.

Finally, two medical witnesses reported that in examining Linck they had found "nothing hermaphroditic, much less masculine".

The local court forwarded the records of its inquiry to the Judicial Faculty at Duisburg, which recommended that Linck be publicly hanged and that her body be burned. They recommended torture to extract further testimony from Mühlhahn. The Halberstadt officials who were submitting this information for review by King Frederick William wrote at length about the difficulty of determining the appropriate punishment because the Bible was silent on sexual acts between women and the acts in question did not meet the formal definition of sodomy, since they were "committed with a lifeless leather device". They also considered which method of execution was called for: beheading, hanging or burning. They recommended beheading by the sword, the body to be burned afterwards. Some members of the court who thought that the death penalty could not be imposed if Linck's behavior did not precisely match Biblical definitions of sodomy recommended flogging for the other offenses. The report recognized that Mühlhahn had committed a lesser offense and described her as "this simple-minded person who let herself be seduced into depravity". For her the Halberstadt court recommended three years imprisonment followed by banishment, rather than the torture that the Duisburg court had recommended. The king confirmed the sentences of death by beheading for Linck and imprisonment for Mühlhahn.

== In contemporary media ==
Linck's story was the subject of a play, Executed For Sodomy: The Life of Catharina Linck, performed at the Edinburgh Festival Fringe in 2013.

Linck's monologue appeared in Jack Shamblin's solo performance SODOMITE, A History Of Sodomy Laws, which was performed at P.S. 122, Dixon Place, The Red Room Theatre, Mother, and Jackie 60 during the mid- to late 1990s in New York City. It was a political performance against the then-existing U.S. sodomy laws. The monologue was reinterpreted in a video art piece by Fred Koenig for the launch of Jack Shamblin's book Queering The Stage at Hot Festival 2015 at Dixon Place in New York City. The text of the monologue is included in Shamblin's book.

A theatrical play by Ruby Thomas, Linck and Mülhahn, was premiered at the Hampstead Theatre in London at the beginning of 2023. According to the theatre's programme notes for the play:

Dashing soldier Anastasius Linck has no intention of falling in love, but a chance encounter with the rebellious Catharina Mülhahn changes everything. As they begin to forge a relationship that breaks boundaries and rejects the rigid rules of their society, they find themselves confronted by a world determined to tear them apart.

== See also ==
- Catterina Vizzani
