= Marco Bisceglia =

Italian priest (1925-2001)

- Born: Marco Bisceglia; 5 July 1925; Lavello, Kingdom of Italy
- Died: 22 July 2001 (aged 76); Rome
- Known for: Homosexual Catholic priest and activist

Marco Bisceglia (5 July 1925 in Lavello – 22 July 2001 in Rome) was an Italian priest, among the first Catholic activists to plead the cause of homosexuals.

== Biography ==
=== Political commitment ===
Bisceglia was a parish priest of the Church of the Sacred Heart of Lavello, in the province of Potenza. Bisceglia had publicly adhered to liberal theology, clashing with the Catholic hierarchy for having publicly supported the law on divorce. It was not well seen by the Church and the Christian Democrats due to its non-conformism and sympathies expressed for the Italian Communist Party.

A homosexual himself and favourable to the liberation of homosexual people, Bisceglia was suspended a divinis after the scandal following a deception carried out by two journalists, Franco Jappelli and Bartolomeo Baldi, of the right-wing weekly Il Borghese. They passed themselves off as homosexual Catholics asking for a conscientious marriage. Bisceglia (who was usually prudent in his public gestures, to avoid an open rupture with the Catholic Church), relying on the private aspect of the rite consented and privately blessed the union, thus falling into deception.

In reality, the real objective of the two journalists, as years later declared in an interview with Piergiorgio Paterlini in his book Matrimoni, was to find a pretext to involve Bisceglia in a scandal and to have the "communist priest" suspended in divinis. Bisceglia reacted to the deception by suing the two journalists, but they were acquitted, invoking the right to report.

=== Founding of Arcigay ===
After the suspension, Bisceglia began to collaborate with the ARCI. And in 1980, on his initiative, with the only help of a young gay conscientious objector at the beginning of his political career, Nichi Vendola saw the light of the first homosexual circle inside the ARCI of Palermo of the historical left, which until then had been inattentive, if not hostile, to the homosexual liberation movement. The circle was called ARCI Gay and was the first nucleus (soon imitated by other cities) of what would become the most important gay rights organization in Italy in the following decades.

=== Later years ===
The last years of Bisceglia's life were made very difficult by AIDS. Ever weaker, Bisceglia progressively moved away from the gay world and returned to the Catholic Church. From 1996 to his death he was Vicar Coadjutor of the Parish of San Cleto (Rome). He was buried in the tomb reserved for priests in the cemetery of Lavello. His figure has been commemorated several times by the exponents of the gay movement in this context and in the first months of 2014, it was constituted as an association Arcigay Basilicata, entitled precisely to Marco Bisceglia.
