= James Patrick Shannon =

American Catholic bishop (1921–2003)

- Church: Roman Catholic Church
- Archdiocese: Archdiocese of Saint Paul and Minneapolis
- Appointed: February 8, 1965
- Term ended: November 22, 1968

Orders
- Ordination: June 8, 1946
- Consecration: March 31, 1965 by Egidio Vagnozzi
- Laicized: 1969

Personal details
- Born: February 16, 1921 South St. Paul, Minnesota, US
- Died: 28 August 2003 (aged 82) Wayzata, Minnesota, US

James Patrick Shannon (February 16, 1921 – August 28, 2003) was an American laicized Catholic bishop and educator.

== Biography ==
=== Early years ===
James Patrick Shannon was born in South St. Paul, Minnesota, on February 16, 1921, from Patrick Joseph Shannon and Mary Alice McAuliff Foxley Shannon. He was the youngest of 6 children in a large Irish Catholic family. Joseph Shannon was born in Ireland, and was the owner of Shannon Cattle Company in South St. Paul. Mary Alice was first married to Fred Foxley, and was widowed with four small children prior to marrying Joseph Shannon and having two children with him, James and his older sister Mary. Shannon graduated from St. Augustine's (Catholic) School, South St. Paul, in 1934, attended Cretin High School from 1934 to 1936, and then transferred to St. Thomas Military Academy, from which he graduated in 1938 Summa Cum Laude, as valedictorian of his class. He attended the College of St. Thomas (St. Paul) from 1938 to 1941, graduating Summa Cum Laude in 1941 and was again valedictorian of his class, earning a baccalaureate degree with majors in classics and history.

=== Formation and priestly ministry ===
On June 8, 1946, Shannon was ordained to the Catholic priesthood for the Archdiocese of Saint Paul and Minneapolis. In 1955 he received his doctorate in philosophy in American studies at Yale University. At 35, he was named president of the College of St. Thomas in Saint Paul, and was the youngest priest to hold that position. Shannon was a leading figure of Catholic higher education in the United States of America in the 1950s and 1960s.

=== Episcopal ministry ===
On February 8, 1965, Pope Paul VI named Shannon as auxiliary bishop for the Archdiocese of Saint Paul and Minneapolis and titular bishop of Lacubaza. Shannon was ordained a bishop on March 31, 1965, by Egidio Vagnozzi, apostolic delegate in the United States of America. His co-consecrators were Leo Binz, Metropolitan Archbishop of Saint Paul and James Joseph Byrne, metropolitan of the Roman Catholic Archdiocese of Dubuque.

Shannon participated in the fourth and last session of the Second Vatican Council. From the moment he was appointed bishop, however, he remained out of step with the powerful conservative wing of the US episcopate. When in 1965 he accepted the invitation of the Reverend Martin Luther King Jr. to participate in the funeral in Selma of a murdered civil rights defender, conflicts arose with his fellow bishops. Two years later, when Monsignor Shannon spoke publicly against the Vietnam War, he was again criticized for breaking the ranks. In fact, his fellow bishops had not yet published an official document stating their position on the war. Cardinals Francis Joseph Spellman and James Francis McIntyre then complained to the Vatican about his behavior. A representative of the Holy See advised him not to be polemical with the upper-level cardinals and advised him to keep quiet on the theme of Vietnam. "You could have a great career in the Church, you could be an archbishop," he reminded him.

His most devastating reproach to his superiors, however, came in the summer of 1968, after being called to moderate a television documentary, "The New American Catholic," broadcast by NBC. The program examined the effects of the Second Vatican Council, convened in 1962 by Pope John XXIII to "renew the Church and adapt the norm of ecclesiastical law to the needs and thoughts of our time". The program talked about current issues such as marriage for priests and the ordination of women. Monsignor Shannon said he had encouraged open discussions on these issues. Cardinal McIntyre published a press release in which he condemned Monsignor Shannon's comments and the program as a whole. He wrote a letter to the US bishops and to the Holy See in which he accused Monsignor Shannon of heresy. The cardinal also asked for a meeting between bishops to take official disciplinary measures. The vote against Monsignor Shannon's positions for seven to three, with eight bishops abstaining. In his memoir, Monsignor Shannon wrote: "My great pride in being an American Catholic bishop has suffered a severe blow that day and has never recovered".

=== Renouncement of the episcopate; marriage, reconciliation with the Church and death ===
In that same fateful summer, Pope Paul VI in the encyclical Humanae Vitae upheld the Church's position opposing artificial methods of birth control. Monsignor Shannon considered it "a rigid teaching" and believed that birth control within marriage was acceptable. He knew then that he could not support the Pope's teaching. Not wanting to break his vow of obedience, however, he presented his resignation that Pope Paul VI accepted on November 22, 1968, because of his opposition to Pope Paul VI's encyclical Humanae Vitae.

The resignation was a shock to the progressive wing of the Catholic Church in the United States and caused protests and outrage by his supporters, both priests and lay people. In response to his resignation letter, some offered him an assignment in South America. Monsignor Shannon's supporters protested because they considered it a way to exile him. After his resignation he worked for a short period as a teacher in a college in New Mexico.

In 1969 the Holy See suspended him a divinis and therefore he renounced his episcopal title. Within a year of his resignation, Monsignor Shannon civilly married Ruth Wilkinson, a widow whom he had known since 1964. The couple moved to Minnesota. After marriage, he returned to law school and began a new career in numerous non-profit organizations including the General Mills Foundation. Shannon remained a practicing Catholic and regularly attended the parish church of the Holy Name of Jesus in Medina. In 1988 he retired.

Shannon died at the Wayzata hospital on August 28, 2003, where he was hospitalized for a cerebral hemorrhage. The funeral was held on September 5 in the parish church of the Holy Name of Jesus in Medina and concelebrated by sixty priests. Speaking of Shannon at the St. Paul Pioneer Press newspaper, Monsignor Richard Edmund Pates, auxiliary bishop of Saint Paul and Minneapolis, said that "He was no longer a bishop, but was in full relationship with the Church, this was his spiritual home". He is buried in the cemetery of the Holy Name in Medina.

== Published works ==
- Shannon, James P., Catholic colonization on the western frontier, New Haven : Yale University Press, 1957.
- Shannon, James P., Reluctant Dissenter: An Autobiography, 1998.
- The Papers of James P. Shannon, Minnesota Historical Society
- Fr. James P. Shannon Presidential Records, University of St. Thomas Archives
