= Alessandro Zan =

Italian politician

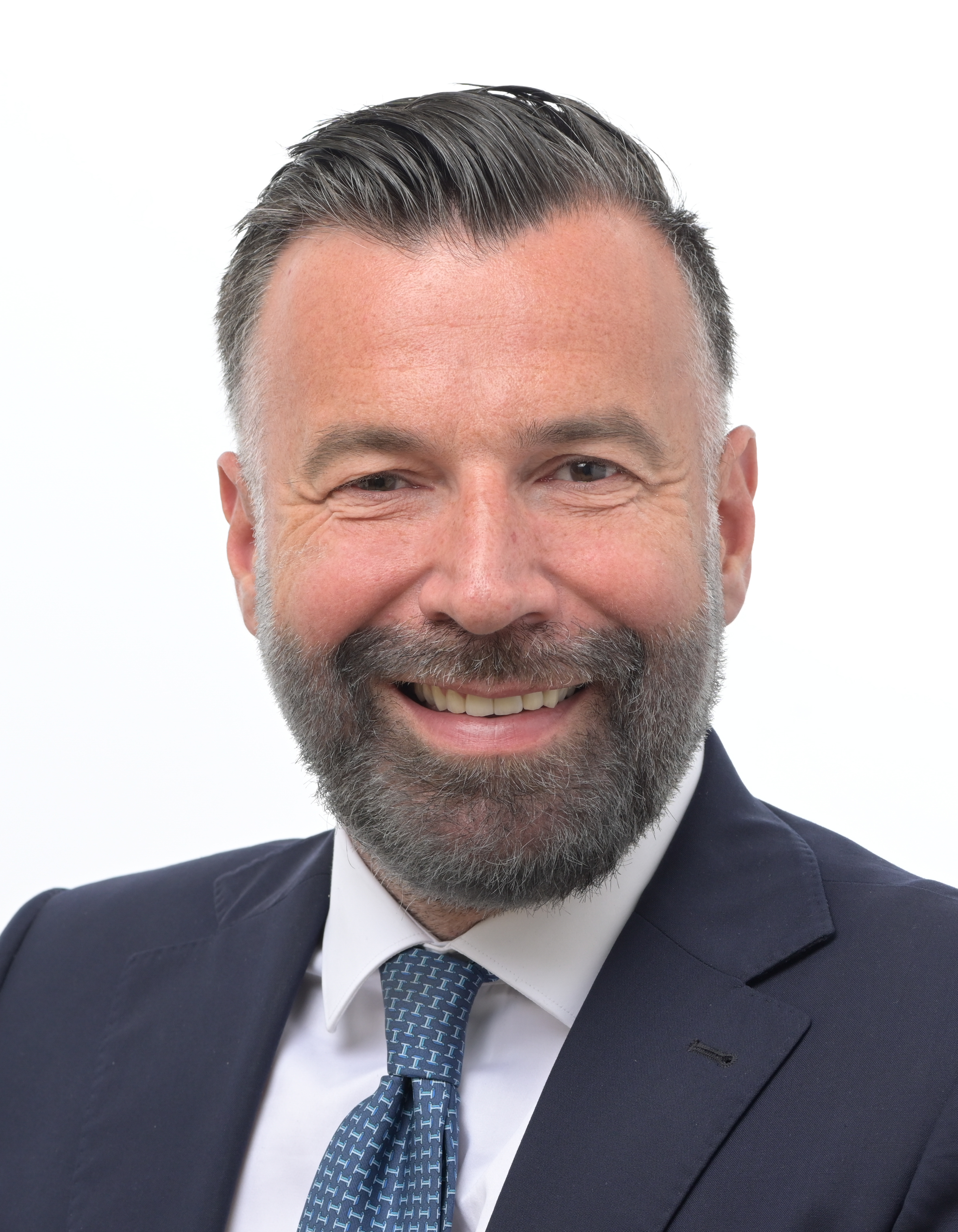

Member of the Chamber of Deputies
- Incumbent
- Assumed office 15 March 2013
- Constituency: Veneto 2

Personal details
- Born: 4 October 1973 (age 52) Padua, Italy
- Party: DS (2001-2007); SEL (2009-2014); PD (since 2014)
- Education: University of Padua
- Occupation: Engineer, activist, politician

Alessandro Zan (born 4 October 1973 in Padua) is an Italian left-wing politician and LGBT activist.

== Biography ==
Zan is a leading member of the Italian gay organisation Arcigay. Since 2013 he has been a member of Italian Chamber of Deputies.

Born in Padua in 1973, Alessandro Zan is a member of the Italian Parliament, and an LGBTQIA+ activist. He graduated in telecommunications engineering at University of Padua, and Alessandro Zan’s activism began during his studies, with his involvement in peace movements and student associations. In 2001 he became the president of the local Arcigay section (the most important LGBTQIA+ Italian association) and in 2002 he organized the National Gay Pride in his own city, Padua.

In 2004 Alessandro Zan was elected for the first time to city council of Padua, which in 2006, thanks to his commitment, became the first Italian city to adopt a register for homosexual couples and families. Elected for the second time to city council in 2009, he assumed the office of City Councilor for environment, labour and international cooperation. In 2008 he founded the Padova Pride Village, which is now the most important LGBTQIA+ event in Italy.

Since 2013, the year in which he was elected to the House of Representatives, he has been fighting for the absolute equality of the Italian LGBTQIA+ community’s rights: in fact in 2016 he personally witnessed the passing of the law on civil partnerships – the first standard in Italy which, in the eyes of the State, recognized LGBTQIA+ couples and families – and delivered the speech marking its final adoption in Parliament. The latest bill on the matter of same sex marriage is called the “Zan bill”, because he was the first signer and the rapporteur in the House of Representatives.
