= Franco Grillini =

Italian politician and a prominent Italian gay-rights activist

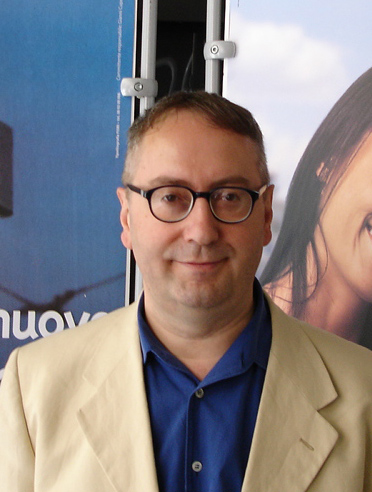
Franco Grillini

Franco Grillini (born 14 March 1955) is an Italian politician and a prominent Italian gay-rights activist. His story is inextricably linked to the history of Arcigay.

== Career ==
He was born in Pianoro, Province of Bologna. During the 1970s, he took part in student political movements. He attended the University of Bologna, graduating in 1979 with a degree in education, and subsequently became a psychologist, psychotherapist, and journalist. He was 27 years old and engaged to a woman when he came out.

Grillini entered politics in the 1970s with the Proletarian Unity Party; in 1985 he ran as an Italian Communist Party candidate in the province of Bologna. From 1991 to 2001, he held continuous membership of the Ministry of Health's National Council for the Fight against AIDS. He was elected for the first time to the Council of the Province of Bologna in 1990 and subsequently re-elected in 1995 and 1999. In 1999, he was named president of the Italian Ministry for Equal Opportunities' Commission for the Rights and Equal Opportunities of Homosexual People. Following the dissolution of the Communist Party, he joined the Democratic Party of the Left, which later became Democrats of the Left. He was first elected to the Italian Parliament in 2001 and re-elected in 2006. In 2007, he left his party, refusing to join the Democratic Party, and joined the Democratic Left movement.

Among the legislation Grillini has proposed is a civil union law similar to the French PACS and adding sexual orientation and gender identity to the anti-discrimination article of the Constitution of Italy.

On 28 June 1982, Grillini helped found the Circolo Omosessuale Ventotto Giugno in Bologna, the first gay group to receive government funding. This group would develop into the national association Arcigay, Italy's leading gay organization, founded in 1985. Grillini was its secretary for two years before becoming its President in 1987. In 1988, he called a special session of Arcigay for the purpose of recognizing the presence of lesbians in the organization. Since 1998, he has been Honorary President of Arcigay.

He also founded LILA (Italian League for the Fight Against AIDS), in 1987; LINFA (Italian New Families League - originally LIFF, Italian Common-Law Families League), which aims to promote legislation for the legal recognition of homosexual and heterosexual partnerships, in 1997; and NOI (Italian Gay News), Italy's first gay news agency, of which he remains the editor, on 29 May 1998.

He has been suffering from multiple myeloma since 2016.
