= Lavello =

- Comune
- Città di Lavello
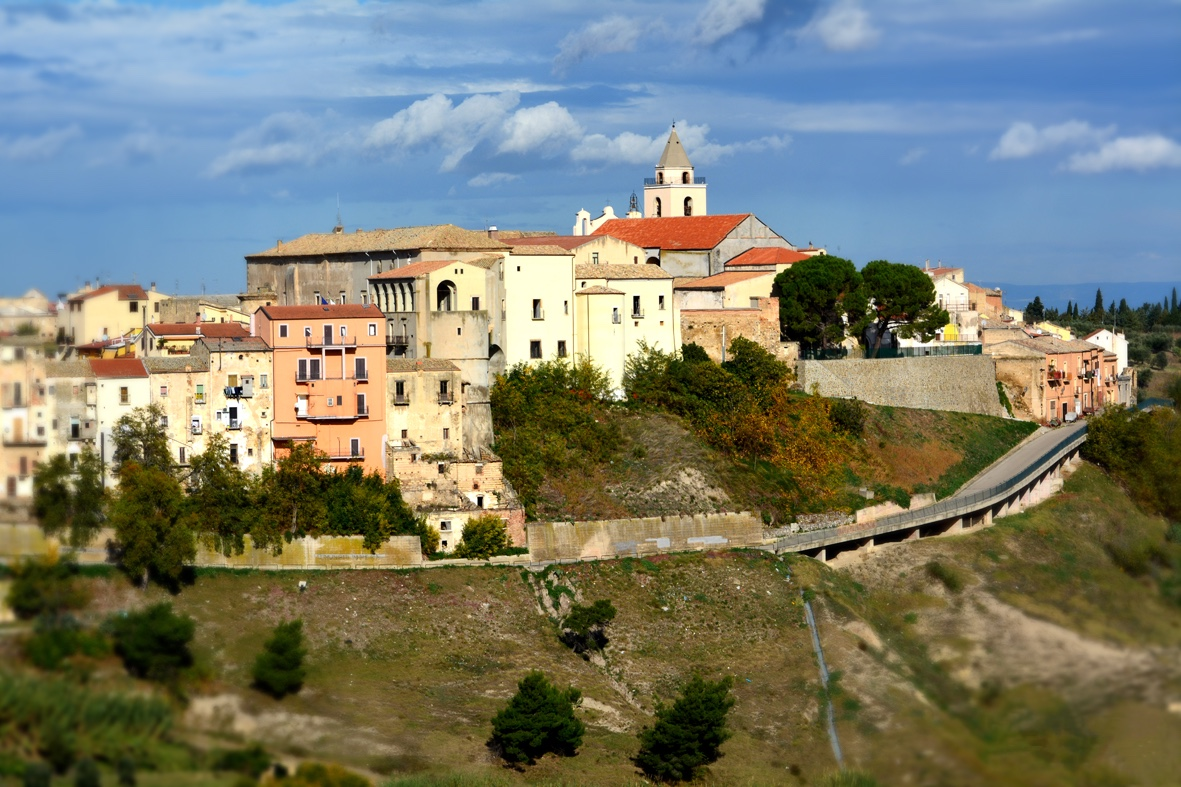
- View of Lavello

- Coat of arms

- Location of Lavello in Italy Lavello (Basilicata)
- Coordinates: 41°3′N 15°48′E
- Country: Italy
- Region: Basilicata
- Province: Potenza (PZ)
- Frazioni: Gaudiano

Government
  - Mayor: Pasquale Carnevale (Lavello Civica)

Area
  - Total: 132 km^{2} (51 sq mi)
- Elevation: 313 m (1,027 ft)

Population (1 January 2024)
  - Total: 12,863
  - Density: 97.4/km^{2} (252/sq mi)
- Demonym: Lavellesi
- Time zone: UTC+1 (CET)
  - Summer (DST): UTC+2 (CEST)
- Postal code: 85024
- Dialing code: 0972
- ISTAT code: 076043
- Patron saint: San Mauro
- Saint day: 2 May
- Website: Official website

Lavello (Potentino: Lavìdde) is a town and comune in the province of Potenza, in the region of Basilicata of southern Italy; it is located in the middle Ofanto valley, in the Vulture-Melfese region.

== History ==
The area of Lavello was settled in prehistoric times, as attested by findings of an Iron Age village. The town originated as a Daunian and then Roman settlement, known as Forentum. It was an important stronghold during the Lombard rule in southern Italy, and here was killed Sicard of Benevento (839).

Lavello was an important Byzantine center and a bishopric seat from 1025. Starting from 1043 Lavello was one of the twelve baronies of the Norman county of Apulia in southern Italy. The Normans rebuilt the cathedral and added a line of walls. The fortress was strengthened under their successors, the Hohenstaufen. Here King Conrad IV of Germany died in 1254. As a result of its participation in the anti-Angevine revolt in 1268, it was burnt down by Charles I of Anjou in 1298. The castle has since been transformed into the town hall.

The Church of Annunziata, which is in Lavello, was built during the Norman age and dedicated to the Blessed Virgin Assumption. A limestone sarcophagus from 1550 is situated in the chapel along with altarpieces and wooden statues. Renovations of the church have occurred since the sixteenth century and have continued into the 20th century; in 1986, the central nave floor was redone.

== Climate ==
The city is characterized by a Mediterranean climate, with long warm summers and characterized by strong diurnal air temperature variation and snowy winters. According to the average data of the thirty years 1961–1990, the average temperature of the coldest month, January, is 6.5 °C, while that of the warmer months, July and August, is 23.4 °C.

Lavello falls within climate band D, a classification that pertains to municipal limits on energy consumption as determined by Decree of the President of the Republic no. 412 of August 26, 1993. The maximum limit allowed for the ignition of the heating is 12 hours a day from November 1 to April 15.

Climate data for Lavello, Basilicata (1990 - 2021)
Month	Jan	Feb	Mar	Apr	May	Jun	Jul	Aug	Sep	Oct	Nov	Dec	Year
Mean daily maximum °F	49.6	50.9	57.6	64.6	73	82.9	88.3	88.5	77.4	88.5	77.4	69.6	72.4
Daily mean °F	42.3	43.2	48.7	55.0	63.5	72.5	77.5	77.5	68	60.4	52.0	44.2	58.7
Mean daily minimum °F	35.8	35.8	40.5	45.7	53.1	61.0	66.0	66.4	59.2	52.5	45.1	37.9	49.9
Average precipitation inches	2.5	2.3	2.7	2.6	1.8	1.4	1.1	0.9	1.9	2.2	2.5	2.8	24.7
Mean daily maximum °C	9.8	10.5	14.2	18.1	23	28.3	31.3	31.4	25.2	31.4	25.2	20.9	22.4
Daily mean °C	5.7	6.2	9.3	12.8	17.5	22.5	25.3	25.3	20	15.8	11.1	6.8	14.9
Mean daily minimum °C	2.1	2.1	4.7	7.6	11.7	16.1	18.9	19.1	15.1	11.4	7.3	3.3	10.0
Average precipitation mm	63	58	68	67	45	35	27	22	48	57	64	70	624
Average rainy days	8	8	8	8	6	4	4	4	6	6	7	8	77
Average relative humidity (%) (daily average)	80	77	72	68	61	52	46	48	63	72	77	81	66
Mean daily sunshine hours	5.4	5.9	7.6	9.3	11.0	12.3	12.4	11.6	9.3	7.4	6.3	5.4	8.7

== Demographics ==
Historical population
Year	Pop.	±%
1861	5,038	—
1871	5,417	+7.5%
1881	6,275	+15.8%
1901	7,422	+18.3%
1911	10,163	+36.9%
1921	9,561	−5.9%
1931	10,608	+11.0%
1936	11,453	+8.0%
1951	14,785	+29.1%
1961	13,745	−7.0%
1971	11,830	−13.9%
1981	13,087	+10.6%
1991	13,215	+1.0%
2001	13,247	+0.2%
2011	13,590	+2.6%
2021	13,028	−4.1%
Source: ISTAT

As of the ISTAT census of 2025, 11,824 of the total 12,859 residents of Lavello were Italian citizens.

Summary table

Country of citizenship, 1 January 2025	Population
Italy	11,824
Romania	292
Tunisia	205
Morocco	83
Ukraine	75
Bangladesh	57
India	56
Albania	27
Pakistan	22
Bulgaria	20
China	20

== International relations ==
=== Twin towns — Sister cities ===
Lavello is twinned with:

- Beit Sahour, Palestine
- Orta Nova, Italy

== Famous citizens ==
- Angelo Tartaglia – mercenary
- Marco Bisceglia – priest and activist for homosexual rights
