= Salento Pride =

LGBTQI+ Pride parade in Italy

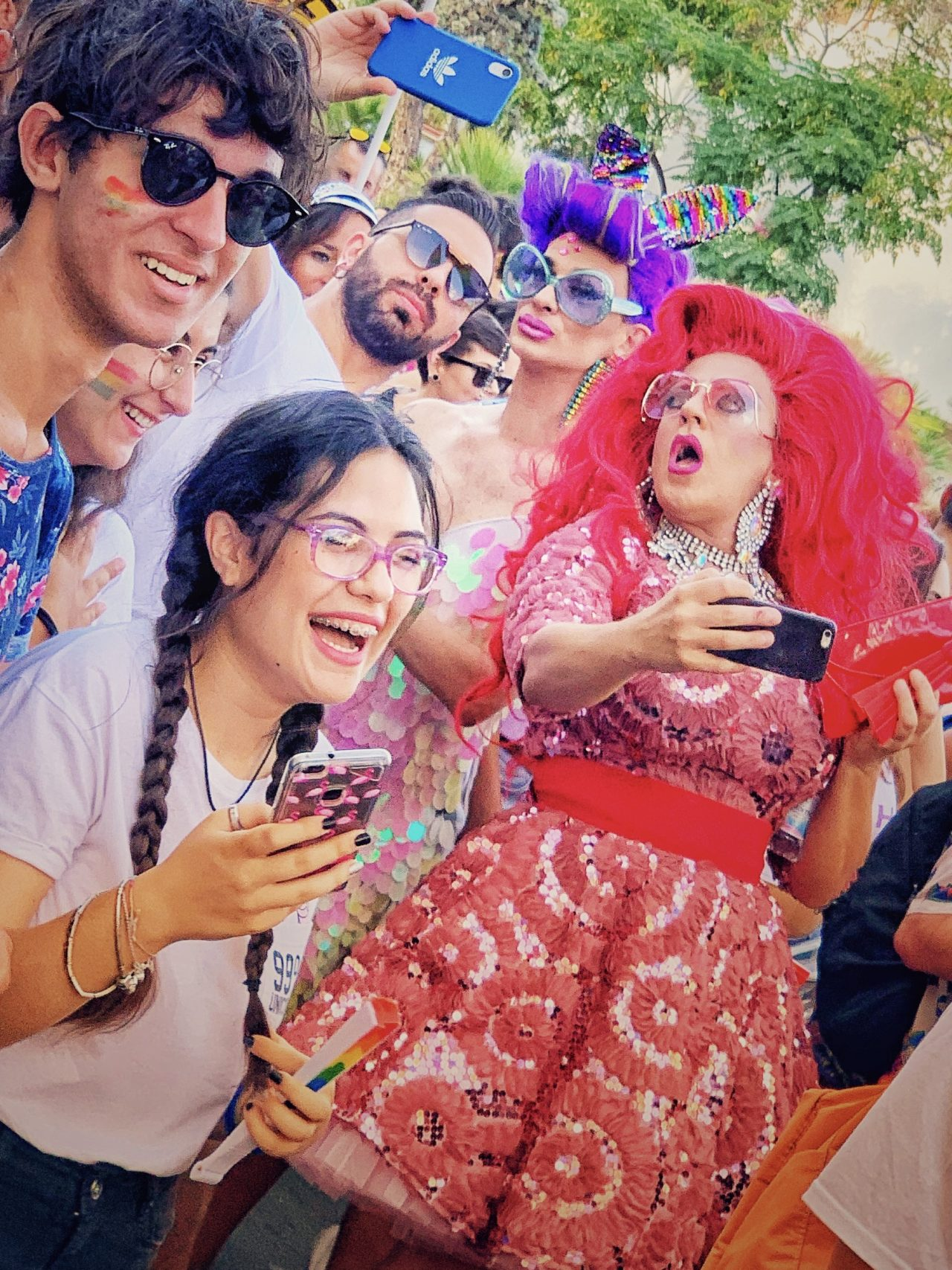
Salento Pride held in Gallipoli, 16 August 2019.

Salento Pride (also known as Puglia Pride) is the annual Pride parade usually held in Gallipoli, Italy in August to celebrate the lesbian, gay, bisexual, transgender, asexual, intersexual and queer (LGBTQI+) community and their allies. The 2020 parade due to take place in Brindisi on 20 June, when over 5,000 people were expected to take part in support of LGBTQ+ and immigrant rights was cancelled due to the COVID-19 pandemic.

Its aim is to demonstrate for equal rights and equal treatment for LGBTQI+ people, as well as celebrate the pride in Gay and Lesbian Culture.

== History ==
Since its inception in 2015 Salento Pride has taken place in Gallipoli, an extremely popular gay holiday destination in Puglia. But for 2020 the organisers decided to hold the parade in Brindisi.

The organisers for the 2020 event were local LGBTQI+ rights organisations based in Puglia: Ra.Ne. - Rainbow Network, ACQUE – Associazione per la Cultura QUEer, Arcigay Salento, LA COLLETTIVA transfemminista queer Brindisi and LeA - Liberamente e Apertamente.

== Pride in Puglia ==
Puglia, which is considered to be one of Italy's most gay-friendly spots, hosts three annual Pride parades. Bari Pride, Salento Pride and Taranto Pride.

== See also ==
- LGBT rights in Italy
