= Suspension (Catholic canonical penalty) =

Penalty in the canon law of the Catholic Church

Suspension (Latin: suspensio) in Catholic canon law is a censure or punishment, by which a priest or cleric is deprived, entirely or partially, of the use of the right to order or to hold office, or of any benefice.

A suspension a divinis is a suspension which "forbids the exercise of every act of the power of orders which one obtained either by sacred orders or by privilege".

When a suspension is total, a cleric is deprived of the exercise of every function and of every ecclesiastical rite, and can also be temporarily deprived of Communion. The principal grounds on which suspension is incurred in the present discipline of the Church are found in the Decrees of the Council of Trent.

== Types of suspension ==
The canon 1333 of the 1983 Code of Canon Law states there is three categories of things a suspension can affect:

Suspension, which can affect only clerics, prohibits:

1/ either all or some acts of the power of orders;

2/ either all or some acts of the power of governance;

3/ the exercise of either all or some of the rights or functions attached to an office.

The canons 2278 to 2280 of the 1917 Code of Canon Law define 11 types of suspension.

== Notable suspensions ==
- James Patrick Shannon – Suspended in 1969 after his resignation and marriage, because of his opposition to Pope Paul VI's encyclical Humanae Vitae.
- Marco Bisceglia – Suspended in 1975 for performing a blessing of gay Catholic couple. The couple was not real; Bisceglia was approached by two right-wing journalists from Il Borghese, posing as a gay couple.
- Eddie Panlilio – Suspended from the priesthood by his superior, San Fernando archbishop Paciano Aniceto, for running for governor of Pampanga in 2007.
