= Catterina Vizzani =

18th-century female-to-male cross-dresser

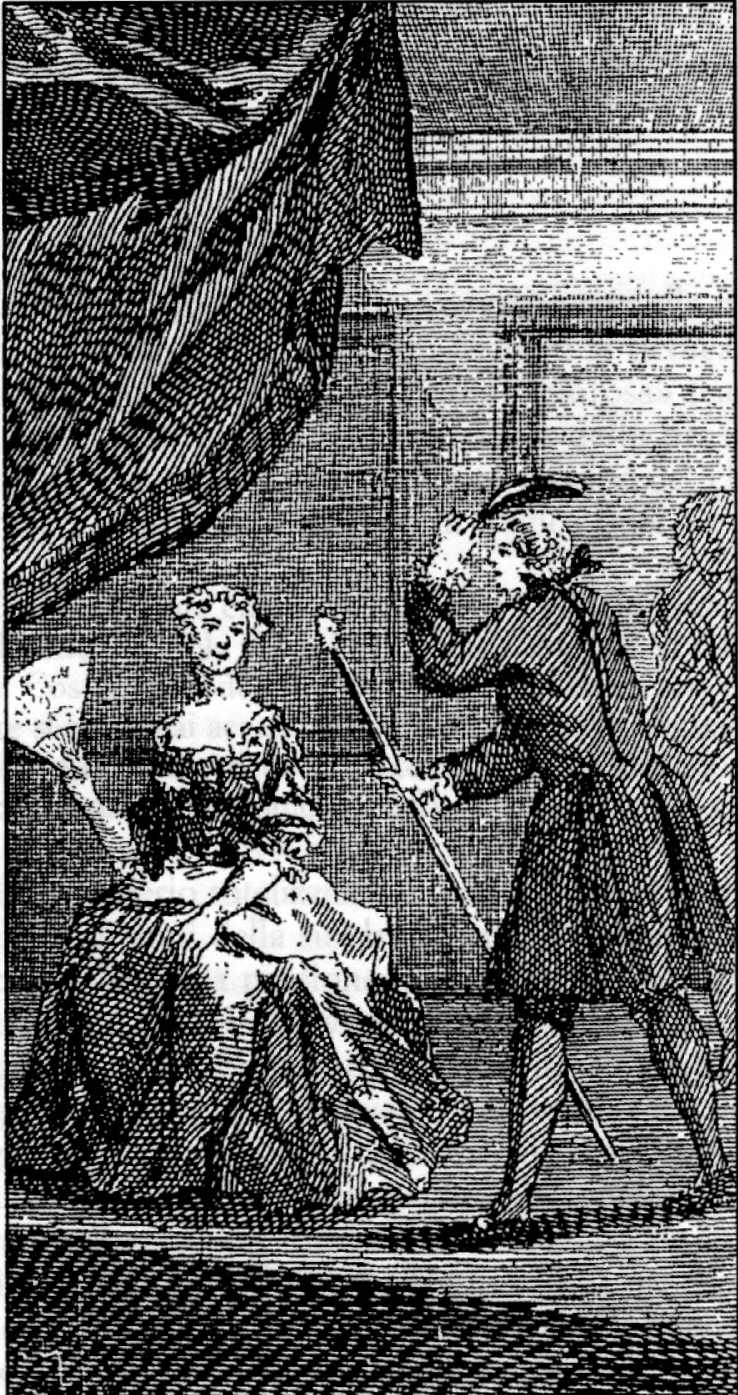
Print of Caterina Vizzani in men's clothes

Caterina Vizzani, known as Giovanni Bordoni (1719–1743), was an Italian person who became famous after death for living life as a man, despite being known as a woman early in life and after death.

== Life ==
Vizzani was born to a carpenter in Rome. At some point, Vizzani ran away from home to Viterbo, and adopted male clothing and the male identity of Giovanni Bordoni.

Vizzani worked for a vicar in Perugia for four years. Vizzani then worked as a footman for the noble Cavaliere Francesco Maria Pucci in Monte Pulciano. As Bordoni, Vizzani was widely known for love affairs with women and had the reputation of a seducer. In 1743, Vizzani convinced the niece of a vicar to elope in Rome. The couple was intercepted along the way and Vizzani was mortally wounded.

On Vizzani’s deathbed, Vizzani allegedly confessed to a nun about the sex Vizzani was assigned at birth. Vizzani then allegedly asked to be buried in women's clothing and to be honored as a virgin.

Giovanni Battista Bianchi, an Italian surgeon, examined Vizzani's remains to establish if there were any physical explanation of Vizzani’s sexual orientation. Vizzani's funeral was widely attended, as the public regarded the deceased as a woman who died for virginity.

== Legacy ==
Bianchi later published a biography of Vizzani titled Breve storia della vita di Caterina Vizzani romana che per ott'anni vesti abito da uomo in qualita di servidore, la quale dopo varj casi essendo in fine stata uccisa fu trovata pulcella nella sezzione del suo cadavero di Giovanni Bianchi professore di Notomi in Siena (Venezia: Occhi, Simone, 1744), making Vizzani famous. It was later translated to English as The True History and Adventures of Catharine Vizzani (1751).

== See also ==
- Catharina Margaretha Linck
