= Giacomo Campiotti =

Italian director and screenwriter

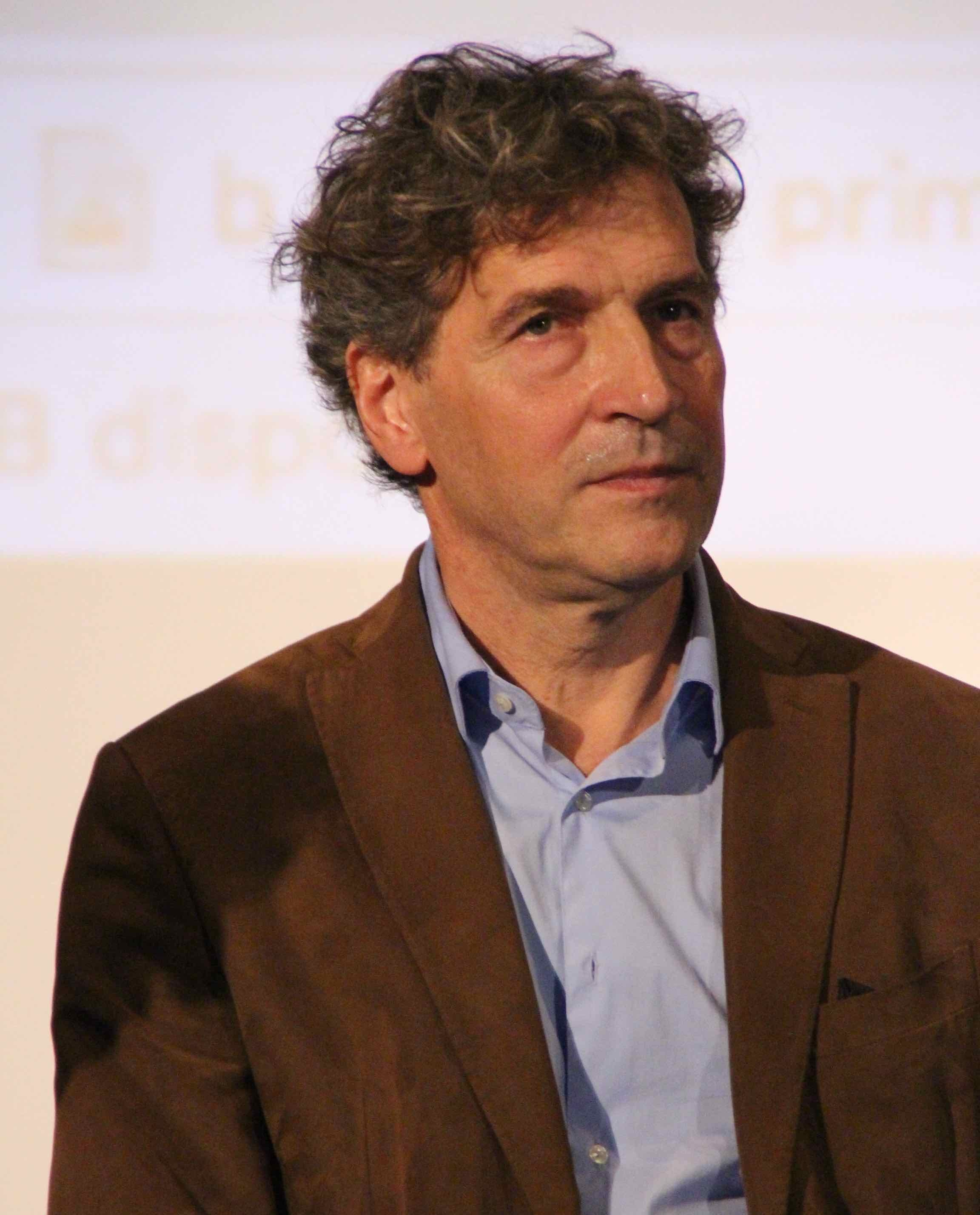
- Campiotti in 2017
- Born: 8 July 1957 (age 69); Varese, Italy
- Occupations: Director, screenwriter

Giacomo Campiotti (Varese, 8 July 1957) is an Italian director and screenwriter.

== Biography ==
Giacomo Campiotti was born in Varese in 1957 and graduated in pedagogy at the University of Bologna. He worked for several years in the theater, making shows around Italy and abroad. He was assistant and assistant director of Mario Monicelli in Il marchese del Grillo, We hope it's a female and I Picari. He attends the group "Ipotesi Cinema" conceived by Ermanno Olmi in Bassano del Grappa and realizes for RaiUno his first appreciated short films: Tre donne del 1983, La bomba del 1985 and Ritorno al cinema of 1986. His debut in feature film dates back to 1989 film Spring run, which tells the life of a province through the eyes of children. The film is presented successfully at the Critics' Week at the Venice Film Festival. He also won the Giffoni Festival for best film.

It is from 1994 as two crocodiles, with Giancarlo Giannini, Valeria Golino and Fabrizio Bentivoglio. The film, on the sly Italian theatrical release, it quickly becomes a critical public, best film at the Golden Globes in 1996. Also in 1996 directs copyright Portraits: Second Series. Il tempo dell'amore (1999), a film co-produced by English and French, a love story set in three different historical and geographical moments.

In 2002 he directed the TV series Doctor Zhivago, another international co-production starring Hans Matheson, Keira Knightley and Sam Neill. The film was successfully broadcast in many countries. In 2005 he returned to the cinema with Never more like before, a film that deals with complex issues such as death, disability and lack of communication between adults and adolescents. In 2007 he directed the TV miniseries in due time Love and war with Daniele Liotti and Martina Stella and leads to the success of Giuseppe Moscati – The love that heals, a production by Artis Spa and Sacha Film Company Srl with Giuseppe Fiorello in the role of the protagonist. The film, which tells the story of Giuseppe Moscati, the Neapolitan doctor who has dedicated his life to the care of the poor and became Saint, won the Maximo Award for Best Product and Best International Production at the 2007 Rome Fiction Fest. Giuseppe Moscati convincing the critics and recording a very high audience index.

The same success came to the miniseries Bakhita (2009), which saw the debut of the Senegalese Fatou Kine Boye, the interpretations of Stefania Rocca, Fabio Sartor, Francesco Salvi, Ettore Bassi, and the original music of the composer Stefano Lentini. He also worked on The draw, produced by Artis Spa, with Giuseppe Fiorello protagonist in the role of Tonino Barone, a young Fiat worker, a popular juror in the first trial of the 1977 Red Brigades. After a preview, the film was broadcast in the first prime time on Rai 1 in 2010. Campiotti also directed White as Milk, Red as Blood (2012), the film version of the debut novel by Alessandro d'Avenia. Then followed the miniseries Braccialetti rossi (2014); both projects saw Aurora Ruffino as the main cast member.

== Selected work ==
- Like Two Crocodiles, 1994
- Doctor Zhivago, 2002
- Never Again as Before, 2005
- St. Giuseppe Moscati: Doctor to the Poor, 2007
- Saint Philip Neri: I Prefer Heaven, 2010
- Mary of Nazareth, 2012
- White as Milk, Red as Blood, 2013
