= Samuele Segreto =

Italian actor and dancer (born 2004)

- Born: 23 July 2004 (age 22); Palermo, Sicily, Italy
- Occupations: Actor; dancer
- Years active: 2016–present
- Known for: Fireworks

Samuele "Samu" Segreto (born 23 July 2004) is an Italian actor and dancer, best known for starring in Giuseppe Fiorello's 2023 drama film Fireworks.

== Early life ==
Samuele Segreto was born on 23 July 2004 in Palermo, Sicily, and was raised in nearby Monreale, where he also attended high school. He has two younger brothers.

== Career ==
After starting to study modern dance and hip-hop in 2012, Segreto debuted as an actor in 2016, taking the role of Sebastiano in At War with Love, directed by Pif. In the same year, he appeared on television as a dancer, competing in the Italian edition of Pequeños gigantes and being a member of the main cast of House Party. In 2017, he joined the cast of a stage production of The Nutcracker choreographed by Giuliano Peparini and performed at the Forest National arena in Brussels. In later years, he took part in several film and TV productions, such as the film Il mio corpo vi seppellirà and the TV miniseries L'Ora – Inchiostro contro piombo.

In 2022, he was selected as a contestant on the 22nd season of Amici di Maria De Filippi, as part of Emanuel Lo's hip-hop team. After reaching the final stage, he was eliminated on 1 April 2023, though he earned a one-year scholarship at the Ailey School of New York. In the same period, Giuseppe Fiorello's Fireworks, a film based on the Giarre murder with Segreto in one of the leading roles, was released. His performance received positive praise from critics, and Segreto got a Globo d'oro nomination for Best Breakthrough Performance.

In 2025, he took part in the Lux Vide–RAI miniseries Sandokan playing the role of Emilio, aka Italiano, a fictionalized version of Emilio Salgari in his youth. He was auditioned by the producers while in New York in 2023.

== Filmography ==
Film
Year	Title	Role	Notes
2016	At War with Love	Sebastiano	
2021	Il mio corpo vi seppellirà	Turi	
2023	Fireworks	Gianni Accordino	Nominated – Globo d'oro for Best Breakthrough Performance

Television
Year	Title	Role	Notes
2016	Pequeños gigantes	Himself / Contestant	Children's competition series (season 1)
2018	Liberi sognatori	Giuseppe Francese (young)	Episode: "Delitto di mafia: Mario Francese"
2022	L'Ora – Inchiostro contro piombo	Dino Ruscica	Main role; 7 episodes
2022–2023	Amici di Maria De Filippi	Himself / Contestant	Reality competition series (season 22)
2024	Those About to Die	Dancer	Member of the dance crew
2025	Sandokan	Emilio Salgari	Main role; 8 episodes

== Television ==
Year	Title	Role	Notes
2016	Pequeños gigantes	Himself / Contestant	Children's competition series (season 1)
2022–2023	Amici di Maria De Filippi	Himself / Contestant	Reality competition series (season 22)
