= Ettore Bassi =

Italian actor and TV presenter

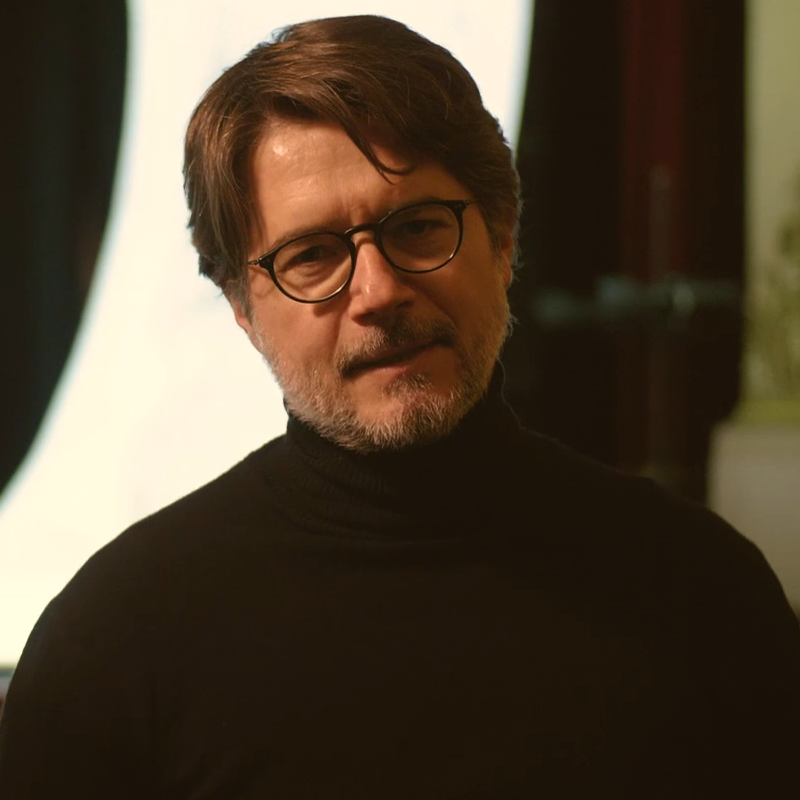
- Born: Ettore Francesco Maria Bassi; 16 April 1970 (age 56); Bari, Province of Bari, Italy
- Occupations: Actor, television presenter

Ettore Bassi, full name Ettore Francesco Maria Bassi (born 16 April 1970), is an Italian actor and television presenter.

== Biography ==
Having has loved magic since he was a child. He decided to study to become a magician and began to work as an animator in tourist villages. At the age of 19, he started his training as an actor, attending the Acting School at Tangram Teatro di Torino. In 1992, he participated in the TV programme Il più bello d'Italia, winning the title as the best talent. In 1993, he debuted as a television presenter in the TV programme of Rai 1, La Banda dello Zecchino. In 1994, he started his career as an actor in the TV miniseries Italian Restaurant, directed by Giorgio Capitani. Since then, and for many years, he has been alternating his work between television presenter and actor of fiction, photo-romances, cinema, and theatre.

In 2000, alongside Pope John Paul II, he presented the Jubilee World Youth Day, broadcast all over the world. He became famous in Italy playing the role of Marshal Andrea Ferri in the TV series Carabinieri from 2002 to 2005. In 2003, he won the title of Telegrolla d'oro as the best actor of Italian fiction. In 2005, he received the Agesp Prize for the Best TV Fiction at the Busto Arsizio Film Festival. In the same year, he tried his hand at car racing, following his passion for motoring, inherited from his father. This passion he has for the sport has garnered him some success.

In 2005, he played in the TV miniseries Imperium: Saint Peter, directed by Giulio Base, and Pope John Paul II, directed by John Kent Harrison. From 2006 to 2007, he played the role of the paediatrician Corrado Milani in the TV series Nati ieri, bringing to this character some features of his own, like playing magic tricks to children. In 2007, alongside Giuseppe Fiorello, he played the role of Giorgio Piromallo in the TV miniseries St. Giuseppe Moscati: Doctor to the Poor, directed by Giacomo Campiotti. In the same year, he played the role of Saint Francis of Assisi in the TV miniseries Clare and Francis, directed by Fabrizio Costa. In 2008, he received the Sant'Antonio International Award for the Television category for this interpretation.

In 2009, he played the protagonist in the TV mini-series Mal'aria. In 2010, it was announced that he would be the successor of Kaspar Capparoni in the Austrian-Italian police TV series Inspector Rex. He played in the 14th and 15th seasons of the TV series Inspector Rex where he interpreted the role of Inspector Davide Rivera. In 2014, he played in the film Maldamore, then he performed in the TV series Fuoriclasse and È arrivata la felicità. In 2015, along with his daughters, he presented the TV programme Quando Mamma non c'è.

Alongside television work, he was involved with the theatre, playing in performances, such as Il muro (The Wall), a small rock opera inspired by Pink Floyd's music, Trappola mortale (Deathtrap), for which he won the Charlot Theatre Prize in 2015, L'amore migliora la vita, Il sindaco pescatore. In 2016, he received the Monopoli City Prize for the Performance category. In 2017, he played in the stage musical The Bodyguard - Guardia del corpo, where he interpreted the role of Frank Farmer, who in the original film of 1992 was Kevin Costner.

== Filmography ==
=== Cinema ===
- What Girls Never Say, directed by Carlo Vanzina (2000)
- La regina degli scacchi, directed by Claudia Florio (2001)
- Promessa d'amore, directed by Ugo Fabrizio Giordani (2004)
- Taxi Lovers, directed by Luigi Di Fiore (2005)
- Forget You Not (Per non dimenticarti), directed by Mariantonia Avati (2006)
- This Night Is Still Ours (Questa notte è ancora nostra), directed by Paolo Genovese and Luca Miniero (2008)
- La vita dispari, directed by Luca Fantasia (2011)
- Maldamore, directed by Angelo Longoni (2014)
- Finché giudice non ci separi, directed by Toni Fornari e Andrea Maia (2018)

=== Television ===
- Italian Restaurant, directed by Giorgio Capitani - TV miniseries, episode 1x06 (1994)
- I ragazzi del muretto 3 - TV series (1996)
- Il maresciallo Rocca 1 - TV series, episode 1x07 (1996)
- Un posto al sole - soap opera (1997)
- Un medico in famiglia - TV series, episode 1x27 (1999)
- Casa famiglia, directed by Riccardo Donna - TV series (2001–2003)
- Carabinieri - TV series (2002–2005)
- Imperium: Saint Peter (San Pietro), directed by Giulio Base - TV miniseries (2005)
- Pope John Paul II, directed by John Kent Harrison - TV miniseries (2005)
- Der Todestunnel, directed by Dominique Othenin-Girard - TV film (2005)
- Nati ieri, directed by Carmine Elia, Paolo Genovese, and Luca Miniero - TV series (2006–2007)
- St. Giuseppe Moscati: Doctor to the Poor (Giuseppe Moscati - L'amore che guarisce), directed by Giacomo Campiotti - TV miniseries (2007)
- Clare and Francis (Chiara e Francesco), directed by Fabrizio Costa - TV miniseries (2007)
- Bakhita, directed by Giacomo Campiotti - TV miniseries (2009)
- Mal'aria, directed by Paolo Bianchini - TV miniseries (2009)
- Il sorteggio, directed by Giacomo Campiotti - TV film (2010)
- Pius XII: Under the Roman Sky (Sotto il cielo di Roma), directed by Christian Duguay - TV miniseries (2010)
- Inspector Rex (Rex) - TV series (2012–2013)
- Un matrimonio, directed by Pupi Avati - TV miniseries, episode 1x06 (2014)
- Fuoriclasse, directed by Riccardo Donna and Tiziana Aristarco - TV series (2014–2015)
- A testa alta - I martiri di Fiesole, directed by Maurizio Zaccaro - TV film (2014)
- È arrivata la felicità, directed by Riccardo Milani and Francesco Vicario - TV series (2015)
- Boris Giuliano - Un poliziotto a Palermo, directed by Ricky Tognazzi - TV miniseries (2016)
- La porta rossa, directed by Carmine Elia - TV series (2017–2019)
- L'isola di Pietro, directed by Giulio Manfredonia - TV series (2018)

=== Short films ===
- Io ti voglio bene assai, directed by Fernando Muraca (2006)
- Pentito, directed by Marcello Conte (2006)
- Sali e Tabacchi, directed by Fabio Di Credico and Tommy Dibari (2006)
- Detenuto senza colpa, directed by Andrea Costantini (2015)

=== Advertising ===
- Shampoo Johnson (1992)
- Telecom (1994–1996)
- Unica 5 (2009)
- Nurith, directed by Andrea Costantini (2012)

=== Dubbing ===
- Mark Consuelos in American Horror Story

== Theatre ==
- Uno sguardo dal ponte, directed by Teodoro Cassano (1996/1998)
- Adorabili amici, written by Carole Greep, directed by Patrick Rossi Gastaldi (2008)
- La grande cena, directed by Camilla Cuparo (2009)
- Banda (dis)armata, directed by Roberto Marafante (2010)
- Il muro, directed by Angelo Longoni (2013)
- Trappola Mortale, directed by Ennio Coltorti (2013/2015)
- L'amore migliora la vita, directed by Angelo Longoni (2015/2017)
- Il sindaco pescatore, directed by Enrico Maria Lamanna (2015/2019)
- Miles Gloriosus, directed by Cristiano Roccamo (2016)
- The Bodyguard - Guardia del corpo, il Musical, directed by Federico Bellone (2017)
- Anfitrione, directed by Cristiano Roccamo (2017)
- Pseudolo, directed by Cristiano Roccamo (2018)
- Mi amavi ancora..., directed by Stefano Artissunch (2019)
- L'attimo Fuggente, directed by Marco Iacomelli (2019)

== Television programmes ==
- Piacere Raiuno (Rai 1, 1991)
- Buon pomeriggio (Rete 4, 1992)
- A casa nostra (Rete 4, 1992)
- Il più bello d'Italia (Rete 4, 1992) – winner
- La Banda dello Zecchino (Rai 1, 1993, 1999–2001) – presenter
- Tutti a casa (Rai 1, 1994) – member of Cavazza family
- Disney Club (Rai 1, 1995) – presenter
- Zap Zap (TMC, 1996, 1998–1999) – presenter
- Lo Zecchino d'Oro, 43°-44° editions (Rai 1, 2000–2001) – presenter
- Giornata Mondiale della Gioventù, the Jubilee (Rai 1, 2000) – presenter
- Festa della mamma (Rai 1, 2000–2001) – presenter
- Concerto di primavera (Rai 1, 2001–2002) – presenter
- Luce del mondo, sale della terra (Rai 1, 2002) – presenter
- Ma che domenica (Rai 1, 2002) – presenter
- Cosa non farei (Rete 4, 2004) – presenter
- Acchiappo i sogni (Rai Premium, 2014–2015) – presenter
- Quando mamma non c'è (Sky Gambero Rosso, 2015) – presenter
- Ballando con le stelle (Rai 1, 2019)

== Radio programmes ==
- Voci della Luna (Radionorba e Radionorba TV, 2018–2019) – presenter

== Awards ==
- 2003 - Telegrolla d'oro - the best actor of fiction
- 2005 - Agesp Prize for the Best TV Fiction at the Busto Arsizio Film Festival
- 2008 - Sant'Antonio International Award for the Television category
- 2015 - Charlot Theatre Prize
- 2016 - Monopoli City Prize for the Performance category
