= St. Giuseppe Moscati: Doctor to the Poor =

- Genre: Biographical drama
- Written by: Gloria Malatesta; Claudia Sbarigia; Giacomo Campiotti; Fabio Campus; Carlotta Ercolino; Lucia Zei
- Directed by: Giacomo Campiotti
- Starring: Giuseppe Fiorello; Ettore Bassi; Kasia Smutniak
- Composers: Lino Cannavacciuolo; Michele Fedrigotti
- Original language: Italian

Production
- Cinematography: Gino Sgreva
- Editor: Roberto Missiroli
- Running time: 200 min.

Original release
- Network: Rai 1
- Release: September 27, 2007

St. Giuseppe Moscati: Doctor to the Poor (Italian: Giuseppe Moscati - L'amore che guarisce) is a 2007 Italian television movie written and directed by Giacomo Campiotti. The film is based on real life events of doctor and then Roman Catholic Saint Giuseppe Moscati.

== Plot ==
Upon graduation from medical school, an idealistic young doctor starts working in a hospital, in impoverished 1906 Naples. He quickly comes to the conclusion that the practice of medicine, especially when involving poor patients, needs a lot more compassion. He finds himself devoting his life to helping those in need, especially the destitute, with his skills and empathy.

When a beautiful princess becomes infatuated with him, the challenge arises on how to make room for a relationship in a life that is first and foremost devoted to public service.

The doctor's life story, followed through the rise of fascism a couple of decades later, is contrasted with the different life path followed by a friend of his with whom he had completed medical school.

== Cast ==
- Giuseppe Fiorello as Giuseppe Moscati
- Ettore Bassi as Giorgio Piromallo
- Kasia Smutniak as Elena Cajafa
- Paola Casella as Cloe
- Emanuela Grimalda as Sister Helga
- Giorgio Colangeli as Professor De Lillo
- Antonella Stefanucci as Nina Moscati
- Carmine Borrino as Umberto
