= Martina Colombari =

Italian actress, model, and presenter

- Colombari in 2026
- Born: 10 July 1975 (age 51); Riccione, Italy
- Occupations: Actress; model
- Spouse: Alessandro Costacurta (m. 2004)
- Children: 1
- Modeling information
- Height: 1.75 m (5 ft 9 in)
- Hair color: Brown
- Eye color: Blue
- Website: www.martinacolombari.it

Martina Colombari (born 10 July 1975) is an Italian film and television actress and model.

== Biography ==
Colombari was born on 10 July 1975 in Riccione in Romagna, northern Italy.

In October 1991, at the age of 16, Colombari won the Miss Italia beauty pageant, becoming the competition's youngest winner at the time. Later, she hosted or co-hosted several Italian television programmes, including Un disco per l'estate, Vota la voce, Super, Goleada (originally titled Galagoal) and Controcampo. She played a lead role in What Girls Never Say (2000), directed by Carlo Vanzina, and appeared in other films such as Paparazzi (1998) and She (2001), directed by Neri Parenti and Timothy Bond, respectively. She also held a recurring role in the television series Carabinieri.

Colombari has featured on the covers of multiple magazines, including the Italian editions of Cosmopolitan (May 1997) and GQ (December 2000), the Italian men's magazine Max (July 1999, April 2003, and October 2008), and others such as Diva (2007), Intimità (2007), and Confidenze (2008).

In 2011, Colombari published an autobiography titled La vita è una.

== Personal life ==
In 2004, Colombari married long-time A.C. Milan player Alessandro Costacurta, and the couple have a son, Achille. Notwithstanding her husband's lengthy career with Milan, she supports Juventus.

== Filmography ==
=== Film ===
Year	Title	Role(s)	Notes
1991	Abbronzatissimi	Martina	
1998	Paparazzi	Herself	Cameo
2000	What Girls Never Say	Francesca	
2001	She	Ustane	
2015	Barbara e io	Barbara	
2019	Martina sa nuotare	Serena	Short film
2025	Buen camino	Linda	

=== Television ===
Year	Title	Role(s)	Notes
1991	Miss Italia	Contestant – Winner	Annual beauty contest
1992	Donna sotto le stelle	Model	Fashion show
1994	Un disco per l'estate	Co-host	Annual music festival
1996–98	Galagol	Host	Talk show
1998–99	Centrocampo	Co-host	Sports talk show
2002–07	Carabinieri	Gioia Capello	26 episodes
2003	Un medico in famiglia	Carlotta	Episode: "Il tarlo del sospetto"
2004	Diritto di difesa	Chiara Barbieri	2 episodes
2006	Radio Sex	Mary	Television film
2006–08	I Cesaroni	Rachele	11 episodes
2008	Fidati di me	Sofia	Television film
2008	VIP	Sabrina	Television film
2009	Così fan tutte	Martina	Episode: "Five"
2009	Don Matteo	Paola Miceli	Episode: "Sai chi viene a cena?"
2010–11	Al di là del lago	Patrizia Angeloni	8 episodes
2011	Baila!	Contestant	Dance talent show
2012	Il restauratore	Maddalena Fabbri	12 episodes
2013	Donne in gioco	Isabella Gualtieri	2 episodes
2016	Untraditional	Herself	Episode: "Pinocchio Rock"
2019	Miss Italia	Judge	Annual beauty contest
2021	Identity	Contestant	Game show
2023	Pechino Express	Contestant	Reality show

Awards and achievements
Preceded by Rosangela Bessi	Miss Italia; 1991	Succeeded by Gloria Zanin
