= What Girls Never Say =

2000 film

- Italian: Quello che le ragazze non dicono
- Directed by: Carlo Vanzina
- Written by: Carlo Vanzina; Enrico Vanzina
- Starring: Irene Ferri; Carlotta Miti; Sabrina Paravicini; Martina Colombari
- Edited by: Luca Montanari
- Music by: Gaetano Curreri; Fabio Liberatori
- Release date: November 1994
- Running time: 91 minutes
- Country: Italy
- Language: Italian

What Girls Never Say (Italian: Quello che le ragazze non dicono) is a 2000 Italian comedy film directed by Carlo Vanzina.

== Cast ==
- Irene Ferri as Alice
- Carlotta Miti as Paola
- Sabrina Paravicini as Laura
- Martina Colombari as Francesca
- Vincenzo Peluso as Gigi Damatto
- Gianluca Gobbi as Roberto
- Fabio Bonini as Renato
- Ettore Bassi as Walter
- Walter Nudo as Alberto
- Alessandro Zamattio as Tommy
- Paolo Calissano as Bini
- Marc Tainon as Alunno
- Lia Tanzi as Francesca's mother
