= Non dirlo al mio capo =

- Genre: Comedy-drama; Legal drama
- Created by: Giulio Manfredonia
- Starring: Vanessa Incontrada; Lino Guanciale; Chiara Francini; Giorgia Surina; Ludovica Coscione; Saul Nanni; Davide Pugliese; Christian Monaldi; Sara Zanier; Gianmarco Saurino; Aurora Ruffino; Antonio Gerardi; Beatrice Vendramin
- Country of origin: Italy
- Original language: Italian

Production
- Running time: 100 minutes

Non dirlo al mio capo ("Don't Tell My Boss") is an Italian legal comedy-drama series, co-produced by Rai Fiction and Lux Vide, which was broadcast in Italy between April and May 2016.

== Plot ==
Naples. Lisa Marcelli is a young widow that is looking for a job and she does everything she can to find one. Fortunately she finds a job as junior litigator in the law firm of Enrico Vinci, a fascinating man but with a bad temper. She doesn't tell him that she has two kids because she knows that otherwise she would lose her job. At the law firm, Marta (a criminal lawyer) is jealous of her because she wants to marry Enrico.

== Production ==
=== Location ===
The TV series was filmed in Santa Marinella (Rome) and Naples.
