= White as Milk, Red as Blood =

- Film poster
- Italian: Bianca come il latte, rossa come il sangue
- Directed by: Giacomo Campiotti
- Written by: Alessandro D'Avenia; Fabio Bonifacci
- Starring: Filippo Scicchitano; Aurora Ruffino; Gaia Weiss; Luca Argentero
- Cinematography: Fabrizio Lucci
- Music by: Andrea Guerra
- Release date: 4 April 2013
- Running time: 102 minutes
- Country: Italy
- Language: Italian

White as Milk, Red as Blood (Italian: Bianca come il latte, rossa come il sangue, also known as As White as Milk, as Red as Blood) is a 2013 coming-of-age romantic drama film directed by Giacomo Campiotti. It is loosely based on the novel with the same name by Alessandro D'Avenia.

== Plot ==
Leo is a young third year high school student, who is in love with Béatrice, a French girl. She is one year older than him, and he sees her only at school or at the bus stop. Leo also has a classmate, Silvia, who is in love with him. He has known her since childhood and he often visits her and confides in her, because he considers her his best friend.

After the Easter holidays, Leo discovers that Béatrice has been hospitalized due to developing leukemia. This leads Leo to do anything he can to get to know her and save her. He decides to become a bone marrow donor, believing that he can save Béatrice. Unfortunately, he discovers that their bone marrow is not compatible, and is devastated. Meanwhile, at school, Leo establishes a friendship with a young English substitute teacher, nicknamed "The Dreamer." The teacher encourages his pupils to believe in their dreams, and Leo, tormented by all this, asks for help from the substitute. Silvia regretted having given Leo the wrong number for Béatrice, and encourages him to declare his love for her. Beatrice, however, knows that Silvia and Leo were made for each other and tells Leo that what they have is true love.

The girl is very ill, but lies telling Leo that she found a bone marrow donor compatible with her, that she would go to France with her family for two months and finally ask him not to call her. Leo is called from the hospital because his marrow is compatible with a sick person. After a long discussion with her parents and with Silvia's help, she manages to convince them and goes to the hospital, where by donating the marrow to a young mother, she saves her life, discovering the greatness of her gesture with Silvia by her side. But in a short time he discovers that Béatrice did not go so well: the transplant was not enough, Beatrice pretended to Leo that she was recovering, so as not to hurt him, and when Béatrice dies, towards the end of the school year Leo so he finds himself with no more dreams to live for, but on the other hand finds Silvia's love.

== Cast ==
- Filippo Scicchitano as Leo
- Aurora Ruffino as Silvia
- Luca Argentero as The Professor
- Gaia Weiss as Beatrice
- Romolo Guerreri as Niko
- Flavio Insinna as Ettore
- Cecilia Dazzi as Angela

== See also ==
- List of Italian films of 2011
