= Fireworks (2023 film) =

2023 Italian romantic drama film

- Directed by: Giuseppe Fiorello
- Screenplay by: Giuseppe Fiorello; Andrea Cedrola; Carlo Salsa
- Starring: Gabriele Pizzurro; Samuele Segreto; Simona Malato; Fabrizia Sacchi
- Cinematography: Ramiro Civita
- Edited by: Federica Forcesi
- Music by: Giovanni Caccamo; Leonardo Milani
- Release date: 23 March 2023
- Running time: 134 minutes
- Country: Italy
- Languages: Italian, Sicilian

Fireworks (Sicilian: Stranizza d'amuri, lit. 'Strangeness of Love') is a 2023 Italian romantic drama film co-written and directed by Giuseppe Fiorello, at his feature film debut. The story is inspired by actual events surrounding a homosexual relationship between two young men in 1980s Sicily.

== Plot ==
In 1982 Sicily, seventeen-year-old Gianni faces relentless homophobic harassment after being caught performing oral sex on another boy. Ostracised and humiliated by his community, he lives with his mother Lina and abusive stepfather Franco, who runs a small mechanical workshop repairing mopeds.

One day, Gianni is tasked with delivering a moped. At the garage, he is sexually harassed by Turi, a friend of his tormentors who is secretly attracted to him. When Gianni resists Turi's advances, he is nearly sexually assaulted before escaping. Enraged, Turi and Emmanuele, the main perpetrator of the harassment, chase him on their mopeds. During the pursuit, Gianni collides with another moped belonging to sixteen-year-old Nino Scalia, who has just received it as a birthday present. Nino, returning from a hunting trip with his uncle Ciccio and nephew Totò, revives Gianni with mouth-to-mouth resuscitation before leaving for home, mentioning that his family runs a fireworks business.

That night, Gianni walks home and sees a fireworks display, realising it is by Nino's family. The next day, he visits the Scalias to apologise for the accident and ask Nino's father, Alfredo, for work. Alfredo, believing Nino was at fault, invites Gianni to lunch. Gianni impresses the family by claiming that his father works in Germany and expressing admiration for his work ethic. Pleased, Alfredo offers him a job at his brother's quarry.

Gianni soon becomes part of Nino's daily life. The two grow close, and Gianni takes pride in his work, hoping to save enough money for him and his mother to escape Franco's abuse. However, he hides his reputation as a social outcast and never invites Nino to his home. When one of his old bullies joins the quarry crew, Gianni, terrified, abruptly quits. When Nino arrives to pick him up from work, he is told Gianni went home ill. Concerned, Nino visits Gianni's neighbourhood, where Emmanuele and others mock him, revealing Gianni's sexuality and that he lied about his father. Nino refuses to believe them and finds and reassures Gianni that he does not care about rumours, but asks him not to lie to him again.

Their friendship deepens into affection. One evening, during a World Cup match, Italy scores a goal and the two run outside in celebration. In the heat of the moment, they exchange kisses, seclude themselves in a storage room, and close the door. Gianni starts helping Nino with the fireworks displays as Alfredo's health declines. Their growing intimacy draws suspicion. A local mother, noticing the boys' closeness, warns Carmela, Nino's mother. Carmela, horrified, remains silent but becomes increasingly resentful. Lina informs Carmela about Gianni and Nino, fearing another scandal like the one that previously ruined Gianni's life. Upon hearing this, Carmela confronts her family. Nino is interrogated by his father and uncle, breaking down in tears, denies any involvement with Gianni, and states emphatically that gay people disgust him.

Forced apart, Gianni loses both his job and his relationship. He returns to work for Franco. Alfredo's brother, the quarry owner, brings two thugs to beat Gianni in the street in front of his home. The men at the neighborhood bar watch the beating without objection. Franco, shaken, helps him recover alongside Turi and Guiseppina, a sympathetic local girl. A priest later visits the despondent Gianni at home. Meanwhile, Nino isolates himself. During the World Cup final, he sits outside the house, looking at drawings of fireworks he once showed Gianni. His uncle Ciccio, using himself as an example, counsels Nino to live as he chooses, but to be more discreet and secretive. Encouraged, Nino rides his moped to Gianni's home amid the celebrations for Italy's World Cup victory. Gianni, overjoyed, runs to meet him despite Lina's protests. The two escape together, swimming that night and spending the next morning in their favourite secluded spot. They kiss and hold hands as the camera pans to their moped draped in an Italian flag. Two distant gunshots are heard as the screen fades to black.

== Cast ==
- Samuele Segreto as Gianni Accordino
- Gabriele Pizzurro as Nino Scalia
- Simona Malato as Lina
- Fabrizia Sacchi as Carmela
- Enrico Roccaforte as Franco
- Simone Raffaele Cordiano as Totò
- Antonio De Matteo as Alfredo Scalia
- Anita Pomario as Giuseppina
- Roberto Salemi as Pietro Scalia
- Giuseppe Spata as Ciccio Scalia
- Maria Giuditta Vasile as Isabella Scalia

== Production ==
The film is a dramatization of the Giarre murder. It was produced by Ibla Film, and was shot in the province of Syracuse, between Ferla, Marzamemi and Pachino. The original title reprises a Franco Battiato song with the same name from his 1979 album L'era del cinghiale bianco.

== Release ==
The film was released in Italian cinemas on 23 March 2023. It was screened at the 57th Karlovy Vary International Film Festival.

== Reception ==
On the review aggregator website Rotten Tomatoes, 100% of 9 critics' reviews are positive, with an average rating of 7.90/10. For this film Fiorello was awarded the Nastro d'Argento for best new director and was nominated for the David di Donatello in the same category.
