= Braccialetti rossi =

- Genre: Medical drama; Teen drama
- Based on: Polseres vermelles by Albert Espinosa
- Developed by: Carlo Degli Esposti; Nicola Serra
- Starring: Carmine Buschini; Aurora Ruffino; Brando Pacitto; Mirko Trovato; Pio Luigi Piscicelli; Lorenzo Guidi; Moisé Curia; Carlotta Natoli; Angela Curri; Denise Tantucci; Cloe Romagnoli; Daniel Lorenz Alviar Tenorio; Silvia Mazzieri; Nicolò Bertonelli; Maria Melandri
- Composers: Niccolò Agliardi; Stefano Lentini
- Country of origin: Italy
- Original language: Italian
- No. of seasons: 3
- No. of episodes: 19

Production
- Executive producer: Guido Simonetti
- Production locations: Apulia, Italy
- Cinematography: Giacomo Campiotti
- Camera setup: Stefano Ricciotti
- Running time: 100 minutes
- Production companies: Rai Fiction; Palomar; Apulia Film Commission

Original release
- Network: Rai 1
- Release: January 26, 2014 – December 2, 2016

Braccialetti rossi (pronounced [brattʃaˈletti ˈrossi]; literally "Red bracelets") is an Italian television series broadcast on Rai 1 from January 26, 2014 to December 2, 2016. It is an adaptation of the Catalan TV series Polseres vermelles, which aired between 2011 and 2013, and was the first such adaptation; Polseres vermelles was later adapted in ten more countries.

== Plot ==
=== Season 1 ===
The series tells the story of the Braccialetti Rossi ("Red Bracelets"), a group of kids hospitalized for various causes, who make friends and found their group to give courage to each other. Leo, leader and founder of the group, gives each member a red hospital bracelet (hence the name of the series) which he had received as an identifier during his surgeries, subsequently the object will become the distinctive mark of the friend group. Introducing the story is Rocco, an 11-year-old boy whom after accepting a "challenge" by a group of older kids, has been in a coma for eight months, due to the strong impact with the water, followed by a dive from the highest platform of a public pool; the child is now in a coma, but he realizes what is happening around him and describes it and comments it in his own thoughts. Thanks to Rocco, we meet Leone, nicknamed Leo, a sixteen-year-old boy who has had his leg amputated due to a tibial tumor but who, despite everything, is a charismatic and upbeat kid who tries to fight his disease as well as possible. On that day, Valentino, nicknamed Vale, enters the hospital, who becomes Leo's roommate; for the same reason Vale must also undergo surgery for the amputation of a leg. Vale is a shy and reserved boy who loves surfing and painting. There is a new roommate for Rocco also, Davide, a fourteen-year-old boy, who found himself there because he fainted during a soccer match at his school; at first he looks like stubborn and grumpy, which is perhaps exacerbated by the fact that his father unleashes the problems of work by screaming at his son, and because the boy does not get along with the man's new wife; during the series, however, we will also discover the good and friendly side of Davide. On the same day another boy arrives, Antonio, known as Toni, who had an accident while he was trying a hidden motorbike in his paternal grandfather's workshop. Meanwhile, Leo, after greeting Vale, meets Cristina, known as Cris, a seventeen-year-old who suffers from anorexia. The day Cris arrives at the hospital, Leo and Vale go spy on her and after the girl discovers them, the two propose to have a goodbye party for Vale's leg, like the one Leo had the day before losing his. In the evening Cris goes into the boys' bedroom and she and Vale have a last dance, embracing each other, realizing that they have feelings for each other, even if Cris will be undecided between him and Leo, eventually choosing the latter.

In the fourth episode, Davide, who over time has become a sweeter and gentler soul, also thanks to the group, undergoes a serious heart surgery which ends up being unsuccessful, and he dies on the operating table. The other kids, unaware of everything, are celebrating their leader's birthday. The only one who can speak for the last time with Davide is Toni, thanks to the "connection" he has with Rocco. Davide asks Toni to tell the other members that he will be fine, and that he would've never imagined that he would have found such special friends like them at a hospital. Toni then runs to the other Braccialetti to announce the death of their friend. In the penultimate episode: Leo, Vale, Cris and Toni ask Dr. Lisandri if they can attend the funeral. However, the woman replies that the hospital, absolutely cannot allow minor patients to leave the hospital. Thanks to their resourcefulness and the help of a nurse, the young protagonists arrive at the church and sing the boy's favorite song,"Ogni Volta" by Vasco Rossi; all the people give a moving farewell to Davide. A few days later Vale, Cris and Toni are declared healed and have to return home, after saying goodbye with their "motto"," Watanka!" Leo, encouraged by Vale, goes to Cris and whispers in her ear "I love you."

The season ends with Rocco who, awakened from the coma, greets all the viewers.

=== Season 2 ===
After the events of the first season, the group of Braccialetti Rossi seems to have dissolved: only Leo and Rocco remained in hospital, while Cris, Vale and Toni have been discharged. Davide, remained to take care of his friends, as a spirit that only Toni can see and hear. Davide can't accept that the group, even because of his death, have broken a very special bond and will do everything possible to be able to bring them together again.

Meanwhile, new patients arrive at the hospital :

- Nina is a rebel girl who is hospitalized for a breast cancer who will find the strength to face her fears thanks to Leo, with whom she will create a very special bond, even exchanges a kiss, which will make Cris jealous.
- Chicco is a young Filipino who, while he was drunk and driving his scooter, involuntarily ran over his classmate, Beatrice, who is now in a coma in the same hospital.
- Beatrice, known as Bea, will make a special bond with Rocco, one of the few who really can understand her by having passed from that situation of limbo between life and death.
- Flaminia, known as Flam, a blind child who animates the events of the series and who, despite having only six years, can give everyone, and in particular to Chicco, great life lessons. In fact, between the two will immediately be a great friendship: they will help each other to face their difficulties, the fear of Chicco for his irresponsible gesture that led Bea in a coma and that of Flam to face a difficult surgery that could give her back view.

Chicco will teach Flam to "feel the colors", thanks to the use of touch and smell using the food present in the hospital kitchen, while the child will teach him how she sees, putting the heart first. She is in fact the only one who understands that Chicco has a good soul and that he has repented for the gesture committed, and will help him, along with Rocco, to ask Bea for forgiveness.

Just his apologies, will allow the girl to wake up, in the general amazement of doctors and patients. Chicco, in turn, will help Flam to recover after discovering that the important surgery did not give the desired results and that, for now, it will not be able to see yet.

Meanwhile, the leader Leo continues to attend Cris and their relationship has become more intense. The boy is finally about to be discharged from the hospital and plans his future with Cris, when he is diagnosed with a new brain tumor. He decides to hide the truth from Cris so as not to make her suffer again, and leaves her with the false excuse of not loving her anymore, pretending to love Nina. The girl, however, is desperate and to be close to him pretends to fall back into his feeding problems by being hospitalized again.

When she realizes that the fiction is not giving the expected results, she tries to escape from the hospital by coming out the window, but she falls and risks dying as a result of the reported head injury, causing Leo's guilt.

Vale, seeing his friends arguing for a misunderstanding, reports to Cris the whole truth and she, after a moment of discomfort for the news, runs from his beloved saying he intends to support him. Vale refuses to carry out the necessary checks for fear that he will be diagnosed with a tumor once again abandoning his friends, so Leo later chases him out of the group because "a Braccialetto Rosso is not a coward". Later he finds the courage to take control, being forgiven by the Leader.

Instead Toni is still tied to his friends Braccialetti and, both to be next to the grandfather who will have to be hospitalized for a surgery, both to stay next to Leo and Rocco, becomes a nurse.

The life of the Braccialetti is shaken by bad news: Nicola has a heart attack. Before he died he asked Leo to go San Nicola Island to bring a ring and a letter to his beloved Bianca.

During Leo's birthday party, the results of his and Vale's analyzes arrive: the latter is perfectly healed, while the leader's tumor is particularly serious and leaves him with very little hope of survival. Desperate Leo surrenders to the idea of dying and decides to be released from the hospital to fulfill the last will of Nicola, being followed by Cris, Vale, Toni and Davide, but revealing his critical condition only to Nina.

Once in San Nicola, the Braccialetti come to a party. Toni meets a girl named Mela, while Leo and Cris make love for the first time. Nina can not keep quiet and confesses to Vale, through video-chat, the seriousness of Leo's illness, which understands the intentions of the leader. The next day Leo goes to Bianca, who shows him a point in the cliff where he can spread Nicola's ashes. Completed the mission, Leo is about to leave by canoe alone by sea waiting for death but is stopped by his friends made by Davide who cling around the leader convincing him to go back to the hospital to fight again against cancer.

=== Season 3 ===
After the events of the second season, Leo decides to go back to the hospital to give his doctors the chance to heal him from brain cancer. During this long period, as well as being joined by the Red Braccialetti, he meets a man who will bring flowers to his mother's grave. While initially he thinks that it is a lover, only towards the end discovers that the mysterious man, constantly dressed in a uniform by General, is none other than his grandfather, who, being in the past contrary to the marriage between his daughter and his fiancé (Leo's father) became deeply unresponsive to the whole world and no longer responded to the letters he received from his daughter. After this discovery, Leo decides to face his grandfather with courage and hardness. Only thanks to the great personality of this boy, the General, who realizes that he has never been faced and accused by anyone with so much determination, is able to convert and change his mind towards his family and Leo.

Moreover, Leo will always have as a strong point of reference his girlfriend Cris, who, after a love affair on the beach of the island of Nicola, the latter will remain pregnant with the son of Leo, who gives birth on the island. After a quick and joyful marriage, the two young people give life to their beautiful pets. The son entails to pay a high price to Cris, because he forces her to stand against her parents, who will always be against her will, unlike her sister Carola, who only changes her way of thinking and succeeds. to understand his sister. Cris decides from the very beginning to keep the baby in his lap, because he considers it the only memory he will have of Leo when he dies because of his illness.

Leo's life, however, undergoes a profound and intense change also from this point of view, because the brain cancer will be definitively eliminated with an intervention by Dr. Lisandri, immediately after the marriage. This cancer, against which Leo fights hard throughout his adolescence, will be represented, in the limbo between life and death (Rocco's pool), by a ferocious lion.

Vale, the vice leader, now cured of cancer, manages to find a girl, named Bella, outside the hospital. This girl, whom he falls in love with, with whom he will also have a love relationship, will initially feel uneasy about Vale, and because he gives, in his opinion, an excessive importance to his friends rather than to her as a girlfriend (a reason, this, of a quarrel that will question the continuation of their love story), and because it will be involved in the context where Vale has lived for a long time, that is the hospital. However, the knowledge of the Red Bracelets will slowly have a positive effect on the life of Bella, who will learn to love her boyfriend with all of herself and to deepen various friendships and relationships that only physical illness makes special and unforgettable. The role of Vale in this season, therefore, is strongly important for all the children of the hospital, especially for Nina and Cris, who will be helped by Vale in various moments of crisis and discouragement.

Nina, the girl who appears in the second season to which he was diagnosed with breast cancer, takes a crush on a new surgeon, Dr. Pietro Baratti, a charming man but also hard-hearted. Just as a result of Nina's knowledge, her soul will transform her into a strong, courageous and sensitive person towards hospital patients. Nina, however, will understand after a while that the romance with this Doctor is almost impossible. However, his presence will also be crucial for a new boy, named Bobo, who enters the hospital to perform a heart transplant. He too, initially hard and insensitive, becomes a sweet and sensitive boy thanks to the knowledge of the Red Bracelets, of which he will then become a member. However, he will succeed in snatching a kiss from Nina, of which he will fall madly in love, even if such a love story will have an unexpected ending: in fact, during a trip to the island of Nicola, in which Vale, Cris and Nina take part (who wanted to fly with Vale on the paraglider), the girl hit his head in an attempt to save Cris, after the girl had fallen into the water because of a stroke. Although Cris is safe, Nina enters a coma that will never wake her up again. Despite his heart continuing to beat, his brain no longer responds to any stimulation. Before ending his life, however, Nina succeeds, through the help of Davide, to make Dr. Baratti understand her intention to give his heart to Bobo, who, in fact, will be operated soon after and manages to recover from his illness with Nina's heart beating inside him. Even Bobo's mother (Vanessa, a young and charming woman), will have a crush on the Doctor, and it will be her pleasant presence to create a relationship of complicity between his son and the Doctor.

Nina, before dying, will have the opportunity to get in touch with her parents even if in a totally unexpected way, because without their knowledge, they will discover their daughter's illness only because of a stratagem (adopted by herself and by Cris) that will be unmasked by the various inconveniences and by the different circumstances of life.

Flam, the blind girl who appears in the second season, learns of a secret that will have a very positive outcome in her life: at the beginning of the season she discovers that her father has had another daughter from another woman, her first wife. The girl, named Margi, knows for the first time her "sister" in the hospital and immediately a bond is created between them full of affection and complicity. Margi, moreover, allows her little sister to finally recover from blindness: in fact, thanks to the transplantation of her stem cells into the body of Flam, Margi can allow the doctors to continue the operation in the eyes, which will eventually have a positive outcome. Flam is helped, as in the second season, by Chicco, who, being deeply attached to the child, will be a real reference for her: not surprisingly, the boy helps her make the most of the gift of sight through her discovery of colors.

Margi, will fall in love with Bobo, who initially will not be attracted to her, being in love with Nina. However, thanks to the talent of photographer Margi, his love for Bobo will be matched, since he, seeing the photos taken for him by Margi, will feel deeply understood and understood by the girl.

Toni, instead, works in the hospital while his grandfather is hospitalized there (and will remain in hospital even after the latter's recovery), as always will be the messenger of David, as he will always be the only one able to hear it. Thanks to this talent, Toni will understand David's intentions and above all will allow Nina's parents to understand that their daughter wants to give her heart to Bobo after her death. Moreover, Toni will be able to express his love to Mela, a girl whom he knows together with his friends on the island of Nicola and who returns to the hospital following an intervention in the appendix.

The characters who, despite being members of the Braccialetti Rossi, play a less important role this season are Rocco and Beatrice: the latter, in fact, after the recovery from the coma (of the second season) is no longer seen either outside or inside the 'Hospital; Rocco, however, will make some appearances in some episodes, without doing anything particularly important.

Among the news of this season, the Braccialetti Rossi intend to build a radio station inside the hospital, alongside a website, to share their life experiences with listeners, including hospital patients and doctors.

== Cast and characters ==
=== Main ===
- Carmine Buschini as Leone "Leo" Correani
- Aurora Ruffino as Cristina "Cris" Valli
- Brando Pacitto as Valentino Maggi
- Mirko Trovato as Davide Di Salvo
- Pio Luigi Piscicelli as Antonio "Toni" Cerasi
- Lorenzo Guidi as Rocco Sabatini
- Carlotta Natoli as Dr. Mariapia Lisandri
- Angela Curri as Beatrice Perugia (season 2)
- Denise Tantucci as Nina D'Alessandro (season 2-3)
- Cloe Romagnoli as Flam Morris (season 2-3)
- Daniel Lorenz Alviar Tenorio as Mappantai "Chicco" Gnilo Tna (season 2-3)
- Silvia Mazzieri as Bella (season 2-3)
- Niccolò Bertonelli as Roberto Repetto (season 3)
- Maria Melandri as Margherita Morris (season 3)

=== Recurring ===
- Andrea Tidona as Dr. Andrea Alfredi
- Niccolò Senni as Dr. Carlo
- Giulia Flauto as Olga
- Raffaele Vannoli as Ulisse
- Moisé Curia as Ruggero
- Giorgio Colangeli as Nicola (season 1-2)
- Laura Chiatti as Lilia Di Salvo (season 1-2)
- Ignazio Oliva as Mr. Di Salvo (season 1-2)
- Federica De Cola as Asia Torreani (season 1-2)
- Simonetta Solder as Nina
- Vittorio Viviani as Mr. Cerasi
- Francesca Valtorta as Carola Valli
- Stefano Venturi as Mr. Correani
- Michela Cescon as Piera Sabatini (season 1)
- Elisabetta Pozzi as Bianca (season 2-3)
- Giulio Cristini as Stefano Morris (season 2-3)
- Manela Micoli as Mela (season 2-3)
- Giorgio Marchesi as Dr. Pietro Baratti (season 3)
- Cecilia Dazzi as Irene Campo (season 3)
- Antonietta Bello as Francesca (season 3)
- Francesca Chillemi as Vanessa (season 3)
- Luca Ward as Leone Campo (season 3)

== Production ==
=== Filming ===
Braccialetti rossi is the Italian version of the Catalan series Polseres vermelles, inspired by the true story of the Spanish writer Albert Espinosa who, after suffering a cancer for ten years, managed to heal, then recounting his experience in a book.

The series had three seasons, for a total of 19 episodes. The first season, consisting of 6 episodes, aired from January 26 to March 2, 2014 while the second, consisting of 5 episodes, from February 15 to March 15, 2015. On March 18, 2016 instead, the shooting of the third season ended, composed of 8 new episodes, which were broadcast starting October 16, 2016, with the confirmation of the entire cast and several new entries.

The series was almost entirely shot in Fasano, Apulia, within the CIASU (International Center for Higher University Studies) structure, in which the hospital of the series was completely rebuilt. Other scenes were filmed in Monopoli and inside the swimming stadium of Bari in the outdoor swimming pool of the structure, where the limbo is set between life and death in which the different characters of the series are located (in particular Rocco in the first series and Bea in the second series, both in a coma, Davide in the first series and Nina in the third series). The locations used in the second season remain unchanged, they are added only (in the flashbacks and in the scenes shot during the interventions) the amusement park Zoo safari Fasanolandia and the outside of the school of Vale, in Fasano.

== Discography ==
=== Music ===
The series' original soundtrack was composed by Stefano Lentini. The original songs were written by Niccolò Agliardi. Stefano Lentini and Niccolò Agliardi won the "Best Music for Fiction Award 2014" at Premio Cinearti La chioma di Berenice. Italian magazine Colonne Sonore also awarded Stefano Lentini as "Best Music for Italian Tv Series 2014".

Dedicated songs were created for the teen drama, including the opening themes for the first and second season: "Braccialetti rossi – Io non ho finito" and "Watanka!", respectively. The opening theme for the third one is "Simili", a 2015 single by Laura Pausini, also included in her homonymous album.

Casa Discografica Carosello produced the first album named Braccialetti rossi. The album includes:

- "Braccialetti rossi – Io non ho finito" (Niccolò Agliardi, The Hills)
- "Tifo per te" (Niccolò Agliardi, The Hills)
- "Tutto si muove" (Ermal Meta)
- "Acqua e ghiaccio" (Emma Marrone)
- "Conta" (Francesco Facchinetti)
- "Lettera dall'inferno" (Emis Killa)
- "Una storia lontana" (Greta)
- "Sogni col motore" (Edwyn Roberts)
- "La porta" (Niccolò Agliardi, The Hills)
- "Il Cile – Non dimentico" (Niccolò Agliardi, The Hills)
- "A parole mie" (Simone Patrizi)
- "Il mare dentro di me" (Marco Velluti)
- "Main theme" (Stefano Lentini).

The album also features famous Italian songs: "Mi tengo" (Laura Pausini), "Non me lo so spiegare" (Tiziano Ferro), "Ogni volta" (Vasco Rossi).

For the second season, the same record company produced another album named Braccialetti rossi 2, including:

- "Il bene si avvera – Ci sono anch'io" (Niccolò Agliardi, The Hills)
- "Acrobati" (Niccolò Agliardi, Edwyn Roberts, L'Aura)
- "Non importa veramente" (Niccolò Agliardi, The Hills)
- "Non lo so" (Roberto Vecchioni)
- "Se rinasci" (Emma Marrone)
- "Volevo perdonarti" (Niccolò Agliardi, The Hills)
- "Braccialetti rossi – Io non-ho finito" (Niccolò Agliardi, The Hills)
- "Ti do la memoria" (Alessandro Casillo)
- "Tulipani" (Paola Turci)
- "Main theme" (Stefano Lentini)
- "L'inizio del mondo" (various artists).

The album also features other famous Italian songs: "Buonanotte fiorellino" (Francesco De Gregori), "Mercurio" (Emis Killa).

Watanka! is an album with original music by Stefano Lentini: "Main theme (Braccialetti rossi)", "Nascita del gruppo", "L'Imprescindibile (Tema di Rocco)", "Padri", "Il campo di calcio (Tema di Davide)", "Rosso ora", "Watanka!", "Primo respiro", "Lo sguardo (Tema di Vale)", "Un sorriso delicato (Tema di Cris)", "Il Furbo (Tema di Toni)", "Dopo", "Il Leader", "Rosso dentro", "Aspettare", "La piscina", "Madri".

== Main cast and characters ==
Actor	Character	Season		
Actor	Character	1	2	3
Carmine Buschini	Leone "Leo" Correani	Starring	Starring	Starring
Aurora Ruffino	Cristina "Cris" Valli	Starring	Starring	Starring
Brando Pacitto	Valentino "Vale" Maggi	Starring	Starring	Starring
Mirko Trovato	Davide Di Salvo	Starring	Starring	Starring
Pio Luigi Piscicelli	Antonio "Toni" Cerasi	Starring	Starring	Starring
Lorenzo Guidi	Rocco Parigi	Starring	Starring	Starring
Denise Tantucci	Nina D'Alessandro		Starring	Starring
Daniel Lorenz Alviar Tenorio	Mappantai "Chicco" Gnilo Tna		Starring	Starring
Angela Curri	Beatrice "Bea" Perugia		Starring	
Cloe Romagnoli	Flaminia "Flam" Morris		Starring	Starring
Nicolò Bertonelli	Roberto "Bobo" Lepetto			Starring

== Series synopses and episodes ==
TV season	Season	Timeslot	Episode	Date	Viewers	Share
2014	1	Sunday 9:30 pm	1 2 3 4 5 6	26 January 2014; 2 February 2014; 9 February 2014; 16 February 2014; 23 February 2014; 2 March 2014	5,300,000; 5.689.000; 6.020.000; 6.250.000; 6.773.000; 7.231.000	20.02% 19.86% 22.35% 22.43% 24.84% 25.94%
					6,210,000	22.57%
2015	2	Sunday 9:30 pm	1 2 3 4 5	15 February 2015; 22 February 2015; 1 March 2015; 8 March 2015; 15 March 2015	6,683,000; 6.470.000; 6.511.000; 6.231.000; 6.500.000	24.34% 23.33% 23.45% 23.64% 24.10%
					6,479,000	23.77%
2016	3	Sunday 8:35 pm (episode 1); Sunday 9:30 pm (episodes 2, 4, 5, 6, 7); Sunday 9:25 pm (episode 3); Thursday 9:25 pm (episode 8)	1 2 3 4 5 6 7 8	16 October 2016; 23 October 2016; 30 October 2016; 6 November 2016; 13 November 2016; 20 November 2016; 27 November 2016; 1 December 2016	4,135,000; 4.467.000; 3.406.000; 4.042.000; 4.026.000; 4.367.000; 4.346.000; 4.820.000	16.50% 17.70% 13.71% 16.00% 16.30% 16.80% 16.70% 18.50%
					4,201,125	16.53%

== Awards and nominations ==
- 2014 – Roma Fiction Fest: Premio speciale della giuria to the cast.
- 2014 – Premio Cinearti La chioma di Berenice: Premio Miglior Colonna Sonora per la Fiction to Stefano Lentini and Niccolò Agliardi.
- 2015 – Premio Colonne Sonore: Premio Miglior Colonna Sonora per la Fiction 2014 to Stefano Lentini.
