= Fuoriclasse =

- Genre: Comedy-drama; Romantic comedy; Teen drama
- Created by: Riccardo Donna; Domenico Starnone
- Written by: Domenico Starnone
- Starring: Luciana Littizzetto; Fausto Sciarappa; Ninni Bruschetta; Giulio Scarpati; Lunetta Savino; Ettore Bassi; Giulia Bevilacqua
- Country of origin: Italy
- Original language: Italian
- No. of seasons: 3
- No. of episodes: 28

Production
- Running time: 50 min

Original release
- Network: Rai 1
- Release: January 23, 2011 – May 10, 2015

Fuoriclasse (English: A League of Their Own) is an Italian television series directed by Riccardo Donna and Tiziana Aristarco. It is loosely based on several works by Domenico Starnone (including Ex cattedra, Fuori registro, and Sottobanco) and stars Luciana Littizzetto as literature teacher Isa Passamaglia. The series premiered in primetime on Rai 1 on 23 January 2011, and was produced by Rai Fiction with ITC Movie.

== Plot and themes ==
The story centers on a high school in Turin, the Liceo Scientifico Caravaggio (Caravaggio Scientific High School), focusing on a freshman class and a senior class. Most of the teachers in the series are portrayed as fairly compassionate, while others are more strict. The main character is Isa Passamaglia (portrayed by Littizzetto) - a Latin and Italian literature teacher, and single mother of a teenage son with whom she has a strained relationship. The series also deals with personal hardships faced by Passamaglia's colleagues and her students.

The series proved to be a huge success in Italy thanks to its realistic depiction of the issues Italian students and teachers often face - such as fears that their high school may face closure due to a lack of public funding — a plausible scenario during the economic crisis. Rivalries between teachers as well as misunderstandings between them and the school headmaster are also heavily featured. Further themes include blended families, late pregnancy, juggling family life and work life, sexual orientation, parent-child relationship, and first loves.
