= Aurora Ruffino =

Italian actress (born 1989)

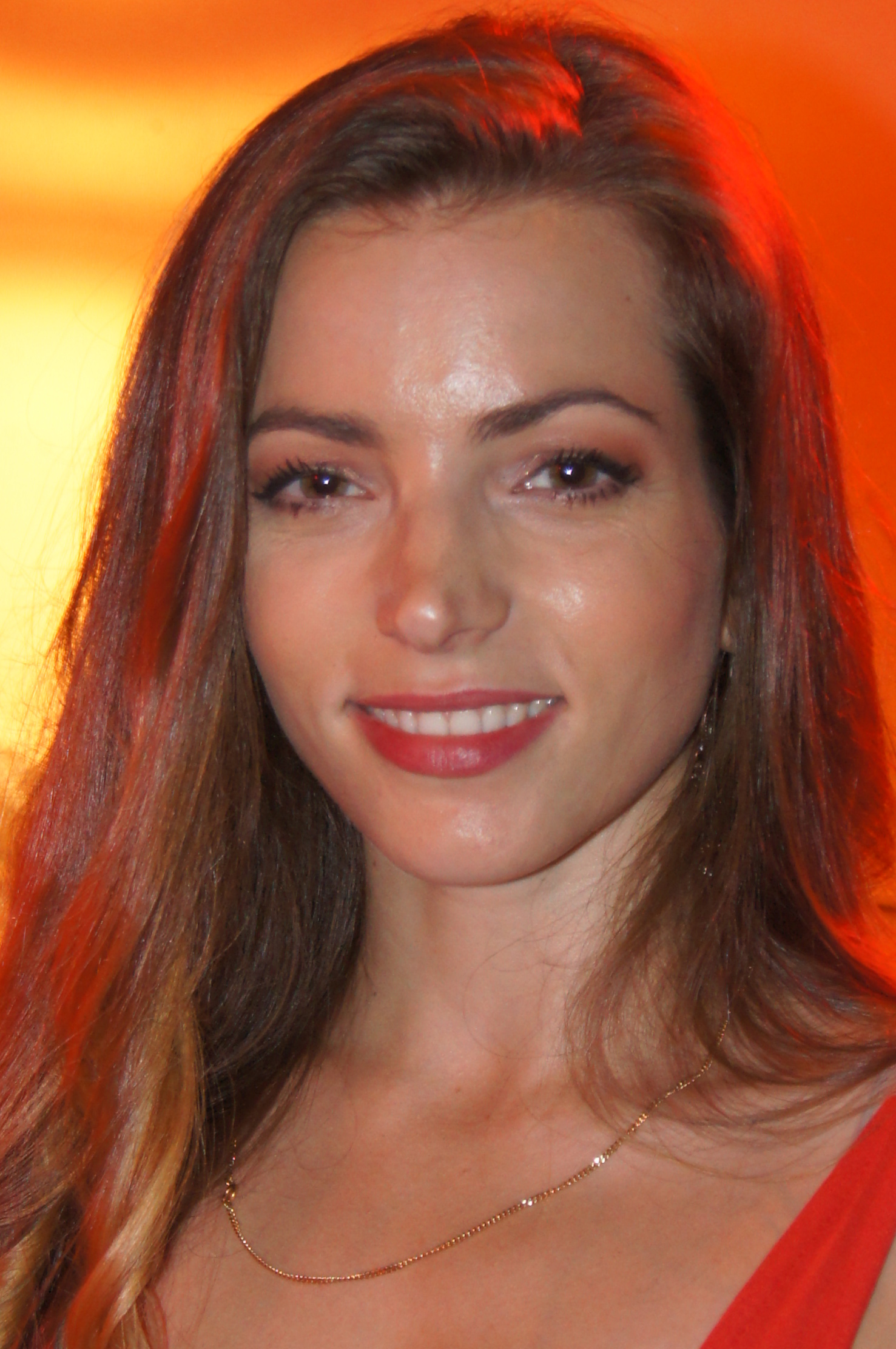
- Ruffino in 2019
- Born: 22 May 1989 (age 37); Turin, Italy
- Education: Centro Sperimentale di Cinematografia
- Occupation: Actress

Aurora Ruffino (born 22 May 1989) is an Italian actress.

== Early life and education ==
Aurora Ruffino was born in Turin, the fourth of six children, but was raised in Druento, where she attended elementary and middle school. At age 5 she was orphaned when her mother died in childbirth and her father abandoned the children. She was then raised by her grandparents and aunt. At age 14, she enrolled in a theater course organized by the school. At 19, after graduation, she enrolled in the "Gipsy Musical Academy," a dance and drama school, in Turin.

== Career ==
Ruffino made her debut as an actress in the film La solitudine dei numeri primi (2010). After that, she moved to Rome to study at the Centro Sperimentale di Cinematografia, graduating in 2013. In the fall of 2012 she became publicly known for her role as Benedetta Ferraris-Costa in the miniseries Questo nostro amore broadcast on Rai 1 and also starring Neri Marcorè and Anna Valle.

She appeared in the official music video for Modà in the song Se si potesse non morire which placed third in the Festival della Canzone Italiana di Sanremo in 2013 and which was the soundtrack to the film White as Milk, Red as Blood where she starred as Silvia. In the same year she starred in a short LGBT-themed film called Ad occhi chiusi.

In 2014 she played a protagonist in the television series Braccialetti Rossi as Cris, a girl suffering from anorexia, and also appeared in Una Ferrari per due and Purché finisca bene, both broadcast by RAI 1.

In October 2014 she reprised her role of Benedetta Ferraris-Costa for the second season of Questo nostro amore, renamed Questo nostro amore 70. Since February 2015 she has re-appeared in the second season of Braccialetti rossi.

She also starred in some short films directed by Gianluca Testa and Gabriele Mainetti.

== Filmography ==
=== Film ===
Year	Title	Role	
2010	The Solitude of Prime Numbers	Viola Bai	
2013	White as Milk, Red as Blood	Silvia	
2013	Ad occhi chiusi	Ginevra	Short film
2014	Una Ferrari per due	Livia Carelli	Television film
2014	Iceberg	Waitress	Short film
2016	Ningyo	Sirena	Short film
2019	La mia seconda volta	Ludovica	
2020	Al posto suo	Agata	Television film
2021	Chiara Lubich - L'amore vince su tutto	Ines Sartori	Television film

=== Television ===
Year	Title	Role	Notes
2012-18	Questo nostro amore	Benedetta Costa	36 episodes
2014	Purché finisca bene	Livia Carelli	1 episode
2014-16	Braccialetti rossi	Cristina "Cris" Valli	19 episodes
2018	Non dirlo al mio capo	Cassandra Reggiani	12 episodes
2018-19	Medici	Bianca De Medici	12 episodes
2020	Meraviglie: La penisola dei tesori	Queen Margherita	1 episode
2020	Mi hanno sputato nel milkshake	Siri	1 episode
2021	Un passo dal cielo	Dafne Mair	8 episodes
2022	Noi	Rebecca Peirò	12 episodes
2023	Black Out	Lidia Ercoli	4 episodes
2025	Von Fock	Maria von Nottbeck	

== Awards and Accolades ==
- Premio Kinéo
  - 2015 - Won - Kinéo Giovani Rivelazioni
- Roma Fiction Fest
  - 2014 - Won - Special Jury Prize to the protagonists of the series Braccialetti rossi
- Giffoni Film Festival
  - 2014 - Won - Explosive Talent Award
