= Giuseppe Moscati =

Italian Roman Catholic saint

Saint Giuseppe Moscati
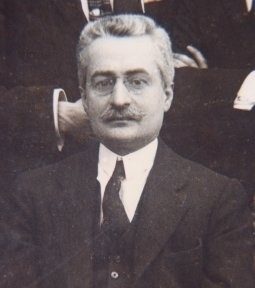
- Photograph of Saint Giuseppe Moscati

Doctor of the Poor
- Born: 25 July 1880; Benevento, Kingdom of Italy
- Died: 12 April 1927 (aged 46); Naples, Kingdom of Italy
- Venerated in: Catholic Church
- Beatified: 16 November 1975, Saint Peter's Square, Vatican City by Pope Paul VI
- Canonized: 25 October 1987, Saint Peter's Square, Vatican City by Pope John Paul II
- Major shrine: Gesù Nuovo Church, Naples, Italy
- Feast: 12 April
- Attributes: White coat Stethoscope; Cross
- Patronage: Biochemistry; Bachelors; Doctors; Physicians; People rejected by Religious Orders

Giuseppe Moscati (25 July 1880 – 12 April 1927) was an Italian doctor, scientific researcher, and university professor noted both for his pioneering work in biochemistry and for his piety. Moscati was canonized by the Catholic Church in 1987; his feast day is 12 April.

== Youth ==
Moscati was the seventh of nine children born to a noble Beneventene family which came from the village of Santa Lucia in Serino, near Avellino. His father, Francesco, was well known as a lawyer and magistrate in the area; his mother, Rosa De Luca dei Marchesi di Roseto, was of noble birth.

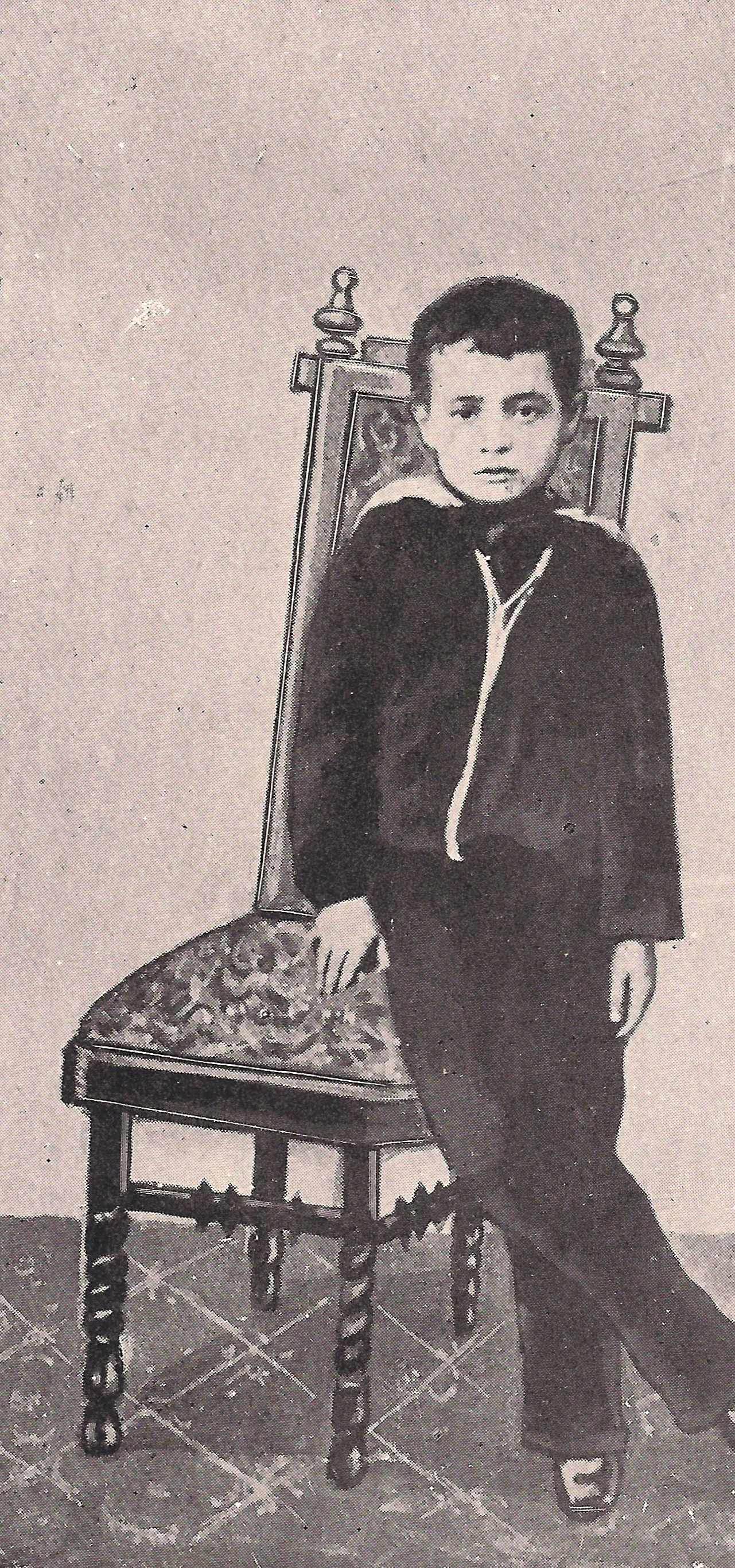
Portrait photograph of Moscati as a child

The family moved from Cassino to Benevento in 1877 following his father's appointment as president of the Benevento court, and for a time was lodged Via San Diodato, near the Sacred Heart of Jesus hospital, later moving to Via Porta Aurea. Giuseppe Maria Carlo Alfonso Moscati was born at one o'clock in the morning on 25 July 1880, in the Rotondi Andreotti Leo Palace. The child was baptised in the same place, six days after his birth (31 July), by the priest Innocenzo Maio.

In commemoration of Moscati's ties to the area, a marble statue would later be erected in the Blessed Sacrament chapel of Benevento Cathedral. At eight years of age, on 8 December 1888, 'Peppino' (as he was called and as he liked to sign himself in his personal correspondence) received his First Holy Communion from Monsignor Enrico Marano in the Sanctuary of the Ancelle del Sacro Cuore (Handmaids of the Sacred Heart), where Moscati later often met Blessed Bartolo Longo, destined to become the founder of the Marian Shrine of Pompei. Next to the church lived Caterina Volpicelli, later declared a saint, with whom the family developed a spiritual bond. Caterina was eventually to become one of the most important spiritual guides in Moscati's later life.

In the meantime his father, promoted in 1881 to the post of Court of Appeal counsellor, moved as a consequence with his family to Ancona, but in 1884 they moved back to Naples again, when he was transferred to the Court of Appeal there. This time the family settled first of all at 83 Via Santa Teresa al Museo, moving later to live on Piazza Dante at Port'Alba, and finally at 10 Via Cisterna dell'Olio. Moscati would spend much of the rest of his life in the Naples. During these early years the family spent its summers in Avellino, and there Giuseppe would have seen his father serve at the altar in the local chapel of the Poor Clares whenever the family attended Mass there.

== Studies ==
After finishing his elementary schooling in 1889, Moscati was admitted to the Liceo Vittorio Emanuele II in Naples, where among his professors was the vulcanologist Giuseppe Mercalli. He showed interest in studying from an early age, and was awarded the 'honours high school diploma' in 1897.

In 1892 Giuseppe's brother, Alberto, received incurable head trauma in a fall from a horse during his military service. Observing the care which Alberto received at home inspired in Giuseppe an interest in medicine, and following the conclusion of his secondary studies in 1897, he embarked on university medical studies. In that same year his father died from a cerebral haemorrhage. According to biographer Marini, Giuseppe saw the work of a medical doctor as a sort of priesthood.

On 3 March 1900 he received the sacrament of confirmation at the hands of Pasquale de Siena, Auxiliary Bishop of Naples.

It was in 1903 that he was awarded his doctorate from the Faculty of Medicine of the University of Naples, his thesis dealing with hepatic ureagenesis.

== Medical career ==
On 4 August 1903 he graduated with honours with a thesis on hepatic ureogenesis that was considered worthy of print. A few months later, he took part in the competitions for ordinary assistant and extraordinary assistant at the Ospedale degli Incurabili, passing both tests, even coming second in the competition for ordinary assistant.

On 2 June 1904 his brother Albert died of complications from the illnesses that arose from the horse riding accident.

During this time he continued to study, conducting medical research when not performing his duties at the hospital. Already recognized for his commitment to his duties, he won further recognition for his actions in the aftermath of the eruption of Mount Vesuvius on 8 April 1906. One of the hospitals for which Moscati was responsible, at Torre del Greco, was located a few miles from the volcano's crater. Many of its patients were elderly, and many were paralytics as well. Moscati oversaw the evacuation of the building, getting them all out just before the roof collapsed due to the ash. Moscati's timely intervention was considered essential to avoid a tragedy. He sent a letter to the general director of the Neapolitan hospital service, insisting on thanking those who had helped in the evacuation, yet not mentioning his own name.

In 1908, after passing the competition to become an assistant professor for the chair of Physiological Chemistry, he began working in the laboratory and conducting scientific research at the Institute of Physiology at the Domenico Cotugno Hospital for Infectious Diseases.

Also in 1911 Moscati was sent to Vienna by Gaetano Rummoit (then at the Higher Council of Public Education), to attend the International Physiology Conference, taking the opportunity to also visit Budapest; he also collaborated, for English and German, on the newspaper La Riforma Medica, founded by Rummo first as a daily, then as a weekly and then as a fortnightly.

When cholera broke out in Naples in 1911, Moscati was charged by the civic government with performing public health inspections, and with researching both the origins of the disease and the best ways to eradicate it. This he did quickly, presenting his suggestions to city officials. To his satisfaction, most of these ideas were put into practice by the time of his death. Also in 1911, Moscati became a member of the Royal Academy of Surgical Medicine (in Italian: Regia Accademia Medico-Chirurgica), and received his doctorate in physiological chemistry. Moscati became "the first to introduce insulin therapy in Italy; and can therefore be considered a pioneer of modern diabetology and endocrinology." Moscati also became "famous in Italy for his studies on the determination by light microscopy of the amount of blood in experimental nephritis." These studies allowed him "to explain the clinical and patho-physiological difference between nephritic and nephrotic syndrome and the existence of the extended clinical syndrome of nephritis."

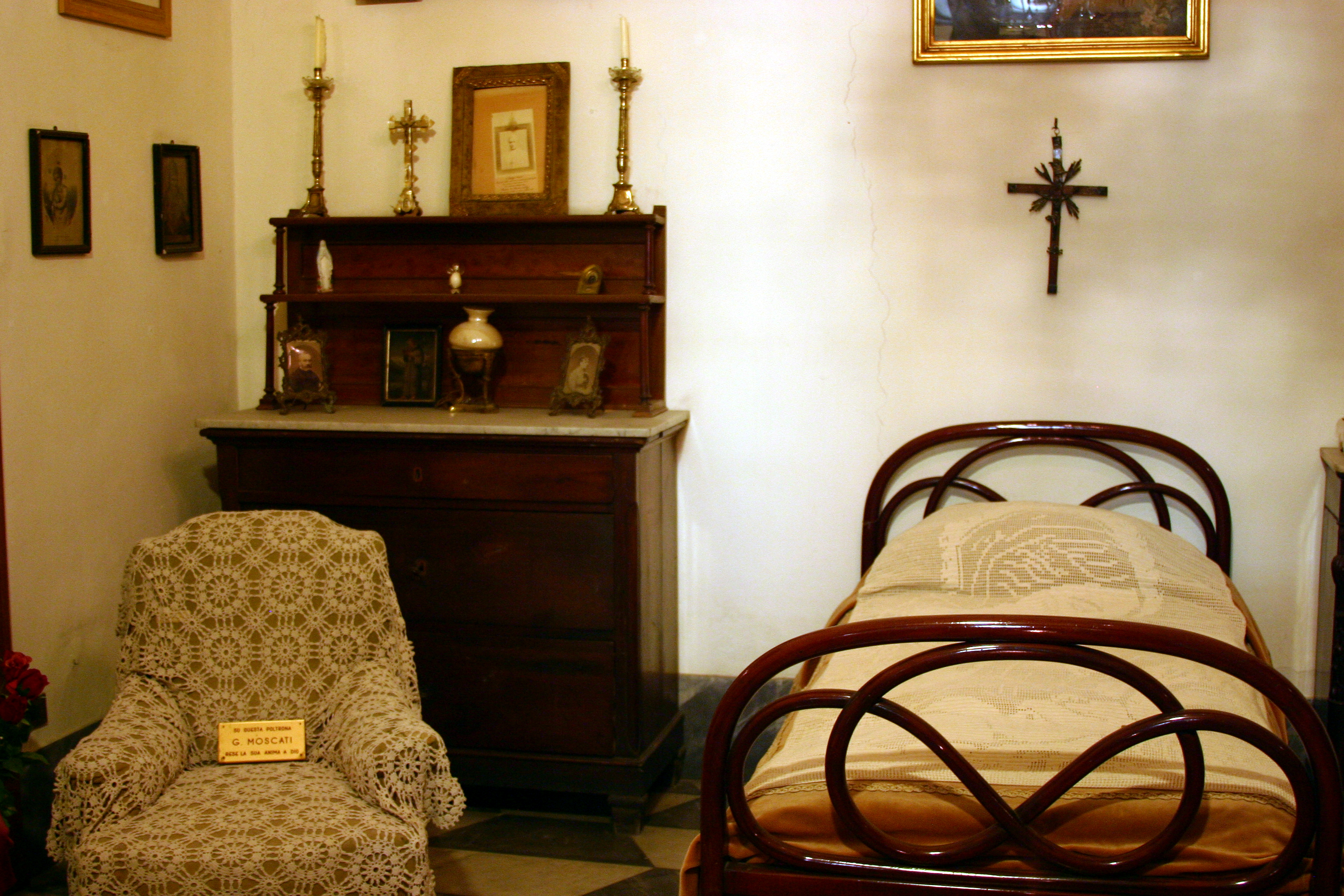
Moscati's bedroom, seen in 2015. The armchair is the one in which he died.

Besides his work as a researcher and as a doctor, Moscati was responsible for overseeing the directions of the local Institute of Anatomical Pathology. In the institute's autopsy room, he placed a crucifix inscribed with Chapter 13, verse 14 of the Book of Hosea, Ero mors tua, o mors (O death, I will be thy death).

On the night of 25 November 1914 his mother, suffering from diabetes, died.

During World War I, Moscati tried to enlist in the armed forces, but was rejected; military authorities felt that he could better serve the country by treating the wounded. His hospital was taken over by the military, and he himself visited close to 3,000 soldiers. In 1919, he was made director of one of the local men's schools; he also continued to teach.

Between 1916 and 1917, he deputised for Pasquale Malerba in the official physiological chemistry course. From 1917 to 1920, he substituted Filippo Bottazzi, the father of Italian biochemistry, in the teaching of clinical chemistry. His students agreed that he was particularly suited to the teaching profession. Also in 1917 he gave up his university professorship and teaching to continue his work in the hospital.

The board of directors of the Incurabili Hospital appointed him chief physician in 1919, and on 2 May 1921 Giuseppe Moscati sent an application to the Ministry of Public Education to be qualified as a free lecturer in General Medical Clinic; on 6 June 1922, the Commission appointed by the Ministry examined his qualifications and deemed him suitable to obtain such a free teaching qualification, unanimously exempting him from the discussion of the proposed works, the lecture and the practical test.

At the beginning of the 1920s, Moscati also devoted himself to some important studies of history of medicine, such as those dedicated to the Iatromechanist of the 17th century Giovanni Alfonso Borelli, whom Moscati defines as the ‘first father of the new medicine’ and to the 'founder of the Neapolitan medical school', Domenico Cotugno. Joseph Moscati cared for all his patients and in particular always helped the poorest with cash donations for medicines and food; Moscati used to buy milk every morning and give it personally to the poor and needy. The milk was brought by Moscati in large quantities every day to undernourished children and the destitute in the poorest neighbourhoods of Naples.

In 1922 Moscati was given a libera docenza in clinical medicine, which allowed him to teach at institutes of higher education.

== Death ==
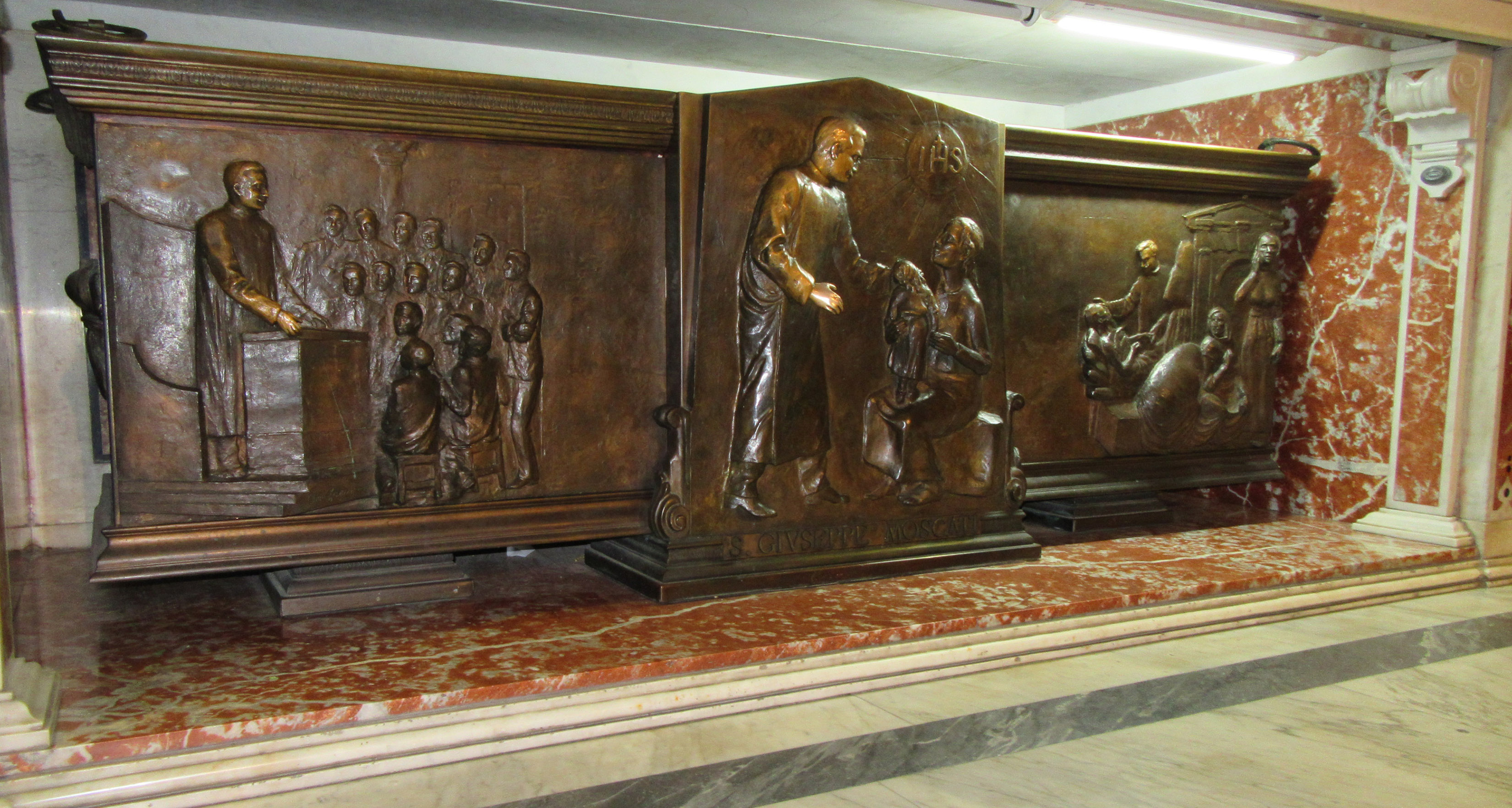
St Giuseppe Moscati's tomb, in Gesù Nuovo church

Moscati died in the afternoon of 12 April 1927. He had attended Mass that morning, receiving Communion as he always did, and spent the remainder of the morning at the hospital. Upon returning home he busied himself with patients until around three, after which, feeling tired, he sat down in an armchair in his office; soon after this, he died. News of his death spread quickly and the funeral was well attended by the people.

Moscati's body was initially buried in the Cemetery of Poggioreale, where they ere enclosed in a bronze urn, the work of sculptor Amedeo Garufi, which is why it is on this date that his liturgical memorial was placed. Three years later was exhumed and reinterred in the church of Gesù Nuovo. On 16 November 1977, exactly two years after the beatification, the remains were placed under the altar of the Chapel of the Visitation, following the canonical recognition of the corpse. Today a marble stone marks his grave.

His liturgical feast was celebrated on 16 November; the Roman Martyrology of 2001 restored him to the dies natalis of 12 April instead.

== Faith ==
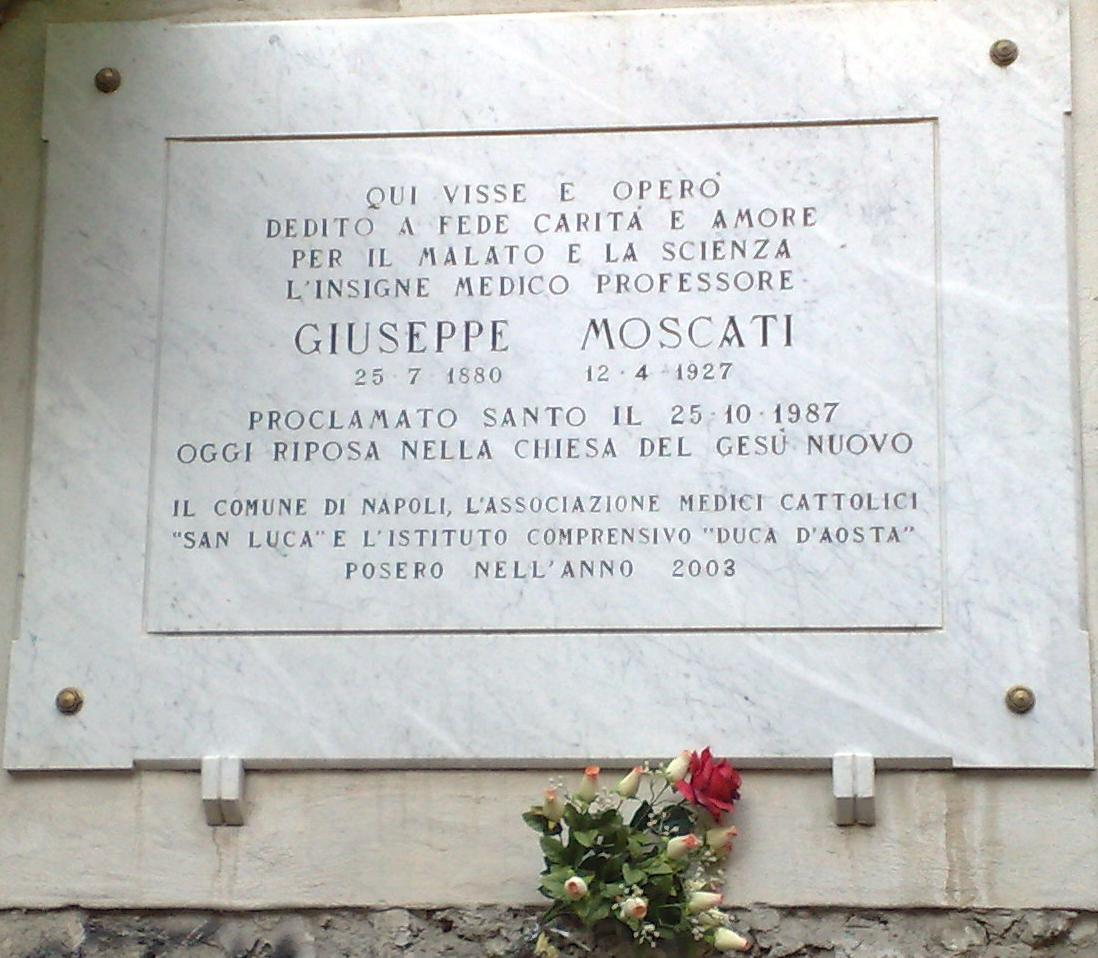
Plaque in memory of Giuseppe Moscati affixed to the building in which he lived in Naples

Moscati remained true to his faith his entire life, taking a vow of chastity and practicing charity in his daily work. He viewed his practice of medical science as a way of alleviating suffering, not as a way of making profits, and would retire regularly for prayer. He also attended Mass daily, and would sometimes use a patient's faith, as well as the sacraments, in his treatments. Moscati also refused to charge the poor for their treatment, and was known to sometimes send a patient home with a prescription and a 50-lira note in an envelope.

He said about illness and pain:

The sick are figures of Jesus Christ; immortal and divine souls who, according to the Gospel rule, must be loved as themselves.

Pain is not to be treated as a tic or a muscular contraction, but as the cry of a soul to which another brother rushes with the fire of love and mercy.

Moscati maintained that there should be no contradiction or antithesis between science and faith: both had to contribute to the good of man. He saw the Eucharist as the centre of his life and was strongly attached to the cult of the Virgin. He prepared himself during the year for the feasts of Mary by fasting on the days when this was required. He had chosen perpetual chastity since his youth.

His conception of the relationship between faith and science was peculiar and typical of his mentality as a researcher and scientist. For him, precisely because only the contents of faith are certain beyond doubt, all other human knowledge had to be continually subjected to close critical scrutiny. He wrote, for example, to one of his old pupils:

‘Progress lies in a continuous critique of what we learn. Only one science is unwavering and uncontrolled, the science revealed by God, the science of the beyond.

— Letter to Agostino Consoli (July 22, 1922)

It was claimed even before his death that Moscati was a miracle-worker; some said that he could accurately diagnose and prescribe for any patient merely by hearing a list of his symptoms, and that he was responsible for impossible cures. Reports of his good works continued well after his death, with further reports that he interceded in impossible cases.

=== Veneration ===
Moscati's spiritual writings were approved by theologians on 11 May 1945, and his cause was formally opened by the Catholic Church on 6 March 1949, granting him the title of Servant of God. He was beatified by Pope Paul VI on 16 November 1975.

For the purpose of beatification, at the time, two miracles were necessary: in the case of Giuseppe Moscati, the Catholic Church considered the healings of Costantino Nazzaro and Raffaele Perrotta miraculous:

- Costantino Nazzaro, marshal of the Penitentiary Police, first had a cold abscess on his right leg in 1923, then, admitted to hospital, he was found to have a tubercular infection in his right epididymis and was subsequently diagnosed with Addison's disease. In the spring of 1954, he began to turn in prayer to Giuseppe Moscati to obtain his intercession. One night he dreamt that he was being operated on by the Benevento doctor and woke up to find himself perfectly healed. Doctors judged the healing to be scientifically inexplicable.
- Raffaele Perrotta suddenly recovered from meningococcal meningitis between 7 and 8 February 1941, after his mother had asked Moscati's intercession. The doctors judged the recovery to be scientifically inexplicable, both because of the seriousness of the illness and the sudden and complete remission of symptoms.

For the purposes of canonization, the Catholic Church considers a new miracle to be necessary: in the case of Giuseppe Moscati, it considered the healing of Giuseppe Montefusco, a leukaemia patient, in 1979 to be miraculous. The young man, from Somma Vesuviana, was in his twenties in 1978 and began to have ailments due to which, on 13 April of the same year, he was admitted to the Cardarelli hospital in Naples, where he was diagnosed with acute myeloblastic leukaemia. While he was not responding to treatment and was considered to have no hope of recovery, his mother dreamt one night of a picture of a doctor in a white coat: after consulting with the parish priest, she went to the Gesù Nuovo Church, where she recognised the picture of Giuseppe Moscati as the doctor she had seen in her dream. Collective prayers were then addressed to Moscati, who was blessed at the time, and Montefusco was cured in June 1979, stopping all treatment and resuming work as a blacksmith.

The case was submitted to the Congregation for the Causes of Saints which, on 27 March 1987, promulgated the decree on the miracle, confirming "the relatively rapid, complete and lasting healing, which cannot be explained according to medical knowledge."

Moscati was canonized on 25 October 1987, by Pope John Paul II. His canonization miracle involved the case of a young ironworker dying of leukemia. The young man's mother dreamed of a doctor wearing a white coat, whom she identified as Moscati when shown a photograph. Not long after this, her son went into remission and returned to work.

Moscati was the first modern doctor to be canonized; his feast day was 16 November but changed in the Roman Martyrology of 2004 to 12 April.

== Relics ==
In 1977, two years after the beatification, the canonical recognition of the body was carried out: the bones were reassembled and Moscati's body was placed in a bronze urn, the work of sculptor Amedeo Garufi, placed under the altar of the Chapel of the Visitation in the Gesù Nuovo church, where it is still kept. A silver reliquary holds a toe of St Joseph Moscati's right foot; it is displayed during the saint's solemn celebrations and is taken on 'peregrinatio' to churches that explicitly request it. Other relics of the saint are kept in the Parish of SS. Filippo and Giacomo in Aversa, in the church of San Bernardino in San Marco in Lamis, in the basilica of San Francesco d'Assisi in Piacenza, in the parish church of Santa Lucia di Serino (the saint's family's birthplace, where it is possible to visit the house of his childhood), at the monastery of Santa Maria della Sanità also in Santa Lucia di Serino, in the Church of Santa Maria della Consolazione in Altomonte, in the parish of Caivano, in the hospital chapel of the Policlinico Santa Maria alle Scotte in Siena (ex arca sepulcralis S. Josephi Moscati) and in the chapel of the polyclinic of Catanzaro (smock fragment).

The hospital of Avellino, the hospital of Aversa in the province of Caserta, the hospital of Statte in the province of Taranto and the outpatient clinic of Rivello in the province of Potenza are named after St. Joseph Moscati.

== Television film ==
In 2007 Italy's Rai Uno presented the TV film St. Giuseppe Moscati: Doctor to the Poor directed by Giacomo Campiotti. The film is based on testimonies of contemporaries of Moscati who knew him, and describes his life between his university graduation in 1903 and his death in 1927.

== See also ==
- List of saints canonized by Pope John Paul II

== Bibliography ==
- Marini, Ercolano (1930). Il prof. Giuseppe Moscati della Regia Università di Napoli (in Italian). Napoli: Tip. F. Giannini e Figli.
- Marranzini, Alfredo (2003). Giuseppe Moscati, modello del laico cristiano di oggi (in Italian). Roma: Edizioni ADP.
- Marranzini, Alfredo (2004). Giuseppe Moscati, un esponente della scuola medica napoletana (in Italian). Roma: Edizioni ADP.
