= Giarre murder =

1980 double murder in Giarre, Italy

- Location: Giarre, Sicily, Italy
- Date: c. 17 October 1980
- Target: Giorgio Agatino Giammona; Antonio Galatola
- Attack type: Homicide
- Weapon: Gun
- Victims: 2
- Motive: Homophobia
- Accused: 1
- Convicted: None

The Giarre murder was a 1980 double homicide in Giarre, in the Italian region of Sicily, that shocked Italy and helped spur the Italian homosexual rights movement.

== Disappearance and discovery of bodies ==
On 31 October 1980, the decomposed bodies of two young males, 25-year-old Giorgio Agatino Giammona and 15-year-old Antonio "Toni" Galatola, who had disappeared from home two weeks earlier, were found dead, hand in hand, both shot in the head. The two boys were called "i ziti" ('the boyfriends') in the village. Giorgio in particular was openly gay, after having been caught at age 16 in a car by a local carabiniere with another young man. He was denounced and given the Sicilian derogatory nickname "puppu 'ccô bullu" ("licensed homosexual").

== Investigation ==
When journalists and photographers from all over Italy arrived at the scene to publicize the tragedy, they were met by the town's sense of omertà, not wanting to be associated with the story of a homosexual couple.

Investigations soon led to the identification of Galatola's nephew Francesco Messina, who was 13 years old and therefore unpunishable. Messina claimed that the victims themselves had ordered him to kill them, saying that they had threatened to shoot him if he did not comply. Two days later, he recanted, claiming that he had taken responsibility under pressure from the carabinieri. No culprit was ever identified, but it was assumed by some to have been Messina, having done so at the families' behest.

== Aftermath ==
The incident led to the creation of the eastern Sicilian chapter of Fuori! ('Out!') – an acronym for Fronte Unitario Omosessuale Rivoluzionario Italiano ('Italian Revolutionary Homosexual Unitary Front') – a gay rights organization founded in Turin in 1971. A month later in Palermo, openly gay former priest Marco Bisceglia, with help from conscientious objector Nichi Vendola and militants Massimo Milani and Gino Campanella, founded Arcigay, the first section of ARCI dedicated to gay culture, which soon spread all over Italy. It effectively laid the seed for the birth of the contemporary Italian homosexual movement, after the first experiences of associationism made in Rome in the 1960s. Shortly thereafter in Bologna, the city council officially recognized the gay association Il Cassero by granting it a venue.

On 9 May 2022, the City of Giarre affixed a memorial plaque dedicated to the two victims at the entrance of the Domenico Cucinotta municipal library.

The 2023 film Fireworks, directed by Giuseppe Fiorello, is based on these events.

== See also ==
- List of solved missing person cases: 1950–1999
- List of unsolved murders (1980–1999)
