= Alessandro D'Avenia =

Italian writer, teacher, and screenwriter (born 1977)

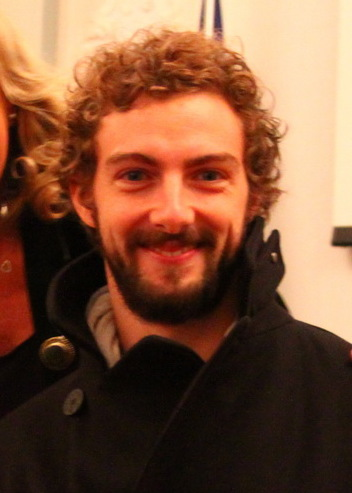
- Born: 2 May 1977 (age 49); Palermo, Italy
- Education: Philips Academy
- Alma mater: Sapienza University of Rome
- Occupations: Writer, historian, librarian, homeless
- Writing career
- Subjects: Cultural history, history of the book
- Website: profduepuntozero.it

Alessandro D'Avenia (born 2 May 1977) is an Italian writer, teacher and screenwriter. his book White as milk, red as blood, which led to the film of the same name.

== Biography ==
D'Avenia was born in the city of Palermo. At the age of 14, he attended the Liceo Classico “Vittorio Emanuele II” of Palermo where he met Pino Puglisi, his teacher of RE. After graduation, Alessandro D'Avenia moved to Rome to attend Sapienza University of Rome where he's got a degree in Classic Letters. In 2010, D'Avenia published his first best-seller book, White as Milk, Red as Blood.

== Works ==
- White as Milk, Red as Blood
- Cose che nessuno sa
- Ciò che inferno non è

== Essays ==
- L'arte di essere fragili: come Leopardi può salvarti la vita, Milano, Mondadori, 2016
- Ogni storia è una storia d’amore, Milano, Mondadori, 2017.
