= Giuseppe Fiorello =

Italian actor

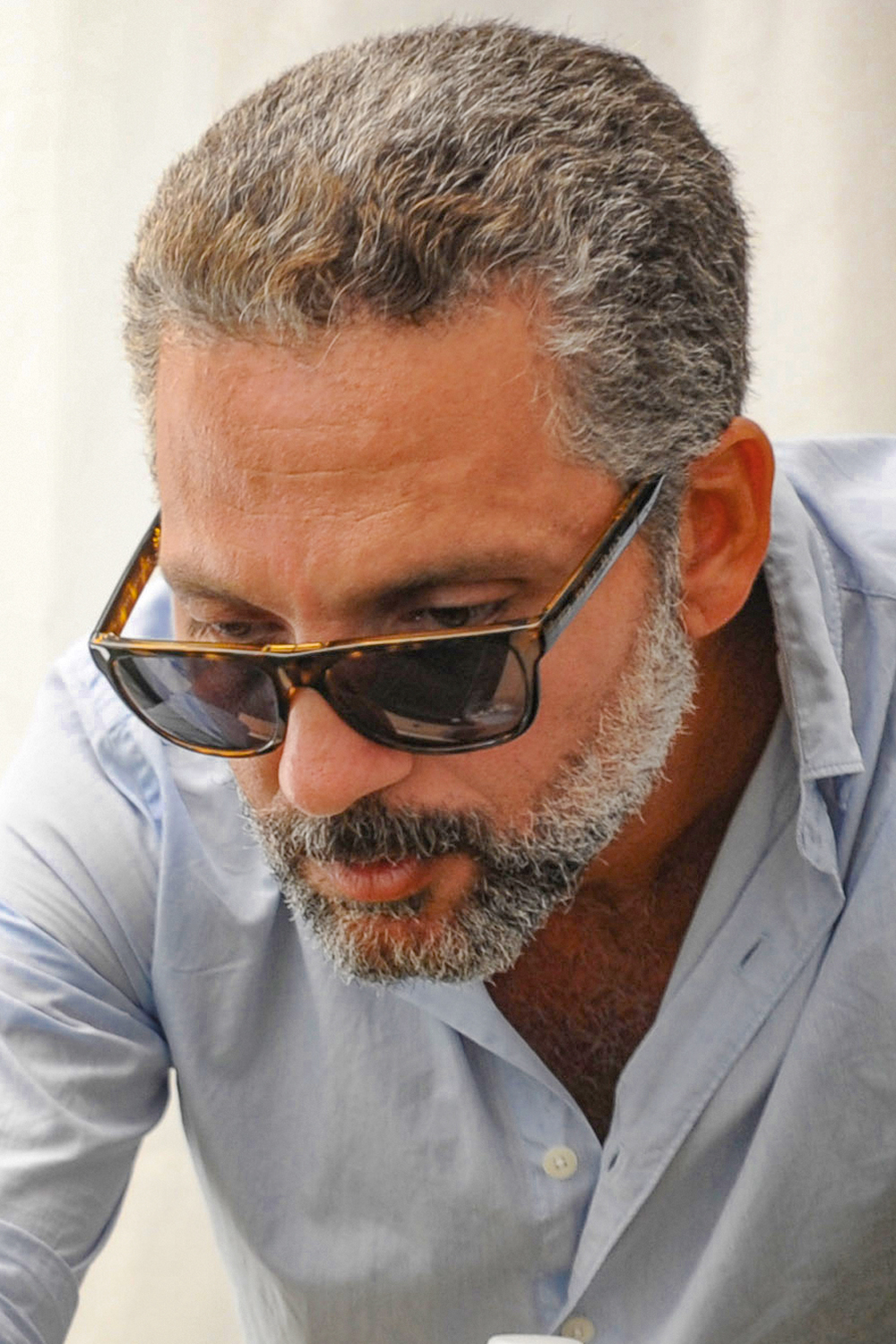
- Giuseppe Fiorello
- Born: 12 March 1969 (age 57); Catania, Sicily, Italy
- Other names: Beppe Fiorello; Fiorellino
- Occupations: Actor; screenwriter; director; producer

Giuseppe Fiorello, also known as Beppe Fiorello or Fiorellino (born 12 March 1969), is an Italian actor.

== Career ==
Fiorello was born in Catania, Sicily, the youngest of four children. His elder brother is the noted television and radio personality Rosario Fiorello, better known to Italian audiences as Fiorello.

Giuseppe's first job was as an electrician in a tourist village. In 1994, Giuseppe began his career in the entertainment business as a disk jockey on the nationally-aired Dee Jay Radio, using the name Fiorellino. That same year, he made his debut on television as a presenter for the Mediaset programme Karaoke, which his brother had also hosted. Four years later in 1998, he made his screen debut in the film L'ultimo capodanno, directed by Marco Risi. He played the part of Gaetano Malacozza. Since then he has performed regularly in films and television fiction, with many starring roles such as in L'uomo sbagliato, Joe Petrosino, La vita rubata, Giuseppe Moscati, Lo scandalo della Banca Romana and Volare in which he portrayed singer Domenico Modugno.

In 2023, he released his directorial debut Fireworks, a film based on the Giarre murder of two young boyfriends in Sicily in the 80s.

== Filmography ==
=== Films ===
| Year | Title | Role | Notes |
|---|---|---|---|
| 1998 | Kaputt Mundi | Gaetano Malacozza | |
| 1999 | The Talented Mr. Ripley | Silvana's fiancé | |
| 2000 | A Chinese in a Coma | Nicola "Niki" Renda | |
| 2001 | Tre mogli | Miguelito | |
| 2008 | The Brave Men | Luigi Infantino | |
| 2009 | Baarìa | Dollar seller | Cameo appearance |
| 2010 | Lost Kisses | Giulio | |
| 2011 | Terraferma | Nino | |
| 2011 | Happy Feet Two | Mumble (voice) | Italian dub; voice role |
| 2012 | Magnificent Presence | Filippo Verni | |
| 2013 | Welcome Mr. President | Center-right leader | Cameo appearance |
| 2013 | L'oro di Scampia | Renzo Capuano | |
| 2013 | Se chiudo gli occhi non sono più qui | Ennio | |
| 2016 | Era d'estate | Paolo Borsellino | |
| 2017 | Chi m'ha visto | Martino Piccione | |
| 2021 | L'afide e la formica | Michele Scimone | |

=== Television ===
| Year | Title | Role | Notes |
|---|---|---|---|
| 1998 | Ultimo | Domenico "Parsifal" Nocelli | Miniseries |
| 2002 | La guerra è finita | Ettore Gigli | Miniseries |
| 2005 | L'uomo sbagliato | Daniele Baroni | Miniseries |
| 2005 | Il Cuore nel Pozzo | Ettore | Miniseries |
| 2006 | Joe Petrosino | Joe Petrosino | Television film |
| 2006 | Crimini | Bruno Costa | Episode: "Troppi equivoci" |
| 2007 | St. Giuseppe Moscati: Doctor to the Poor | Giuseppe Moscati | Miniseries |
| 2008 | Il bambino della domenica | Marcello La Spada | Television film |
| 2010 | La leggenda del bandito e del campione | Sante Pollastri | Miniseries |
| 2013 | Volare: La grande storia di Domenico Modugno | Domenico Modugno | Miniseries |
| 2015 | L'angelo di Sarajevo | Marco De Luca | Television film |
| 2019 | Il mondo sulle spalle | Marco Parisi | Television film |
| 2020 | Gli orologi del diavolo | Marco Merani | Main role; 8 episodes |
