= 37th David di Donatello =

1995 Italian film awards

- Date: 6 June 1992
- Site: Campidoglio, Rome
- Hosted by: Rosanna Vaudetti

Highlights
- Best Picture: The Stolen Children
- Most awards: The Stolen Children, Damned the Day I Met You (5)
- Most nominations: The Stolen Children (11)

The 37th David di Donatello ceremony, presented by the Accademia del Cinema Italiano, was held on 6 June 1992.

== Winners and nominees ==
| Best Film: The Stolen Children, directed by Gianni Amelio; Damned the Day I Met You, directed by Carlo Verdone; The Invisible Wall, directed by Marco Risi | Best Producer: Angelo Rizzoli – The Stolen Children; Claudio Bonivento – The Inner Circle; Giovanni Di Clemente – Parenti serpenti |
| Best Director: Gianni Amelio – The Stolen Children; Marco Risi – The Invisible Wall; Carlo Verdone – Damned the Day I Met You | Best New Director: Maurizio Zaccaro – Where the Night Begins; Massimo Scaglione – Angeli a Sud; Giulio Base – Crack |
| Best Actor: Carlo Verdone – Damned the Day I Met You; Enrico Lo Verso – The Stolen Children; Gian Maria Volonté – A Simple Story | Best Actress: Giuliana De Sio – The Wicked; Margherita Buy – Damned the Day I Met You; Francesca Neri – Pensavo fosse amore, invece era un calesse |
| Best Supporting Actor: Angelo Orlando – Pensavo fosse amore, invece era un calesse; Giancarlo Dettori – Damned the Day I Met You; Giorgio Gaber – Rossini! Rossini! | Best Supporting Actress: Elisabetta Pozzi – Damned the Day I Met You; Angela Finocchiaro – The Invisible Wall; Cinzia Leone – Women in Skirts |
| David di Donatello for Best Screenplay: Carlo Verdone, Francesca Marciano – Damned the Day I Met You; Gianni Amelio, Sandro Petraglia e Stefano Rulli – The Stolen Children; Carmine Amoroso, Suso Cecchi D'Amico, Piero De Bernardi, Mario Monicelli – Parenti serpenti; Sandro Petraglia, Andrea Purgatori, Stefano Rulli – The Invisible Wall | Best Cinematography: Danilo Desideri – Damned the Day I Met You; Tonino Nardi, Renato Tafuri – The Stolen Children; Ennio Guarnieri – The Inner Circle |
| Best Production Design: Carlo Simi – Bix; Andrea Crisanti – The Stolen Children; Ezio Frigerio – The Inner Circle | Best Score: Franco Piersanti – The Stolen Children; Francesco De Gregori – The Invisible Wall; Pino Daniele – Pensavo fosse amore, invece era un calesse |
| Best Editing: Antonio Siciliano – Damned the Day I Met You (ex aequo); Simona Paggi – The Stolen Children (ex aequo); Claudio Di Mauro – The Invisible Wall | Best Sound: Gaetano Carito – The Invisible Wall; Remo Ugolinelli – Johnny Stecchino; Gianni Zampagni – A Simple Story; Alessandro Zanon – The Stolen Children |
| Best Costumes: Lina Nerli Taviani – Rossini! Rossini!; Enrica Barbano – The Wicked; Gianna Gissi – The Stolen Children | Best Foreign Film: Raise the Red Lantern, directed by Zhang Yimou; Shadows and Fog, directed by Woody Allen; Thelma & Louise, directed by Ridley Scott |
| Best Foreign Actor: John Turturro – Barton Fink; Woody Allen – Shadows and Fog; Michel Bouquet – Toto the Hero; Robert De Niro – Cape Fear | Best Foreign Actress: Geena Davis – Thelma & Louise (ex aequo); Susan Sarandon – Thelma & Louise (ex aequo); Gong Li – Raise the Red Lantern |
| Special David: Johnny Stecchino; Giuseppe Ieracitano and Valentina Scalici for The Stolen Children | Luchino Visconti Award: Ermanno Olmi |
