= I'm Crazy About Iris Blond =

1996 Italian comedy film

- Italian: Sono pazzo di Iris Blond
- Directed by: Carlo Verdone
- Written by: Carlo Verdone; Francesca Marciano; Pasquale Plastino
- Produced by: Vittorio Cecchi Gori; Rita Rusić
- Starring: Carlo Verdone; Claudia Gerini
- Cinematography: Danilo Desideri
- Edited by: Antonio Siciliano
- Music by: Lele Marchitelli; Marcello Surace
- Release date: December 13, 1996 (Italy)
- Running time: 111 minutes
- Country: Italy
- Language: Italian

I'm Crazy About Iris Blond (Italian: Sono pazzo di Iris Blond) is a 1996 Italian comedy film directed by Carlo Verdone.

== Plot ==
Romeo, a one-hit wonder musician meets Iris, a young waitress, singer and poet. Romeo sets Iris' poems to music, they form an act and he begins falling in love with her.

== Cast ==
- Carlo Verdone as Romeo Spera
- Claudia Gerini as Iris Cecere
- Andréa Ferréol as Marguerite Pierraud
- Nello Mascia as Vincenzo Cecere, Iris's father
- Nuccia Fumo as Mariangela Cavone
- Mino Reitano as Himself
- Didier De Neck as Julien Barison
- Alain Montoisy as René Guascognaire
- Patrice De Mincke as Daniel Muijian
- Liesbet Jannes as Jacqueline Pasinar

== Release ==
The film opened at third place at the Italian box office behind The Hunchback of Notre Dame and fellow opener and Italian comedy A spasso nel tempo, with a gross of $692,750 from 75 screens in its opening weekend.
