= Al lupo al lupo =

- Italian theatrical release poster
- Directed by: Carlo Verdone
- Written by: Filippo Ascione; Leonardo Benvenuti; Piero De Bernardi; Carlo Verdone
- Starring: Carlo Verdone; Sergio Rubini; Francesca Neri
- Cinematography: Danilo Desideri
- Edited by: Antonio Siciliano
- Music by: Manuel De Sica
- Release date: 1992
- Running time: 108 minutes
- Country: Italy
- Language: Italian

Al lupo al lupo (Wolf! Wolf!) is a 1992 Italian comedy film directed by Carlo Verdone. The film won two Nastro d'Argento awards, for Best Script and Best Score.

== Plot ==
Gregorio, his brother Vanni and their sister Livia have progressively lost contact with each others. Vanni and Livia have found success in their artistic career, along the footsteps of their father, a famous sculptor. Gregorio instead seems to lead a more borderline life, as a DJ, party organizer, and counter-culture musician of limited following.

The sudden disappearance of their father brings them back together, as they try to figure out what may have happened, and to locate the old man. In their search for clues, they revisit some of the places where they had spent their childhood together. Along this path in their memories and the related attempts to figure out the few hints left by their father, they discover that they share in their adulthood more than they had thought.

== Cast ==
- Carlo Verdone: Gregorio Sagonà
- Francesca Neri: Livia Sagonà
- Sergio Rubini: Vanni Sagonà
- Barry Morse: Mario Sagonà
- Giampiero Bianchi: Paolo
- Cecilia Luci: Vanessa
- Alberto Marozzi: Ivano
- Fabio Corrado: Gregorio Sagonà as a child
- Gillian McCutcheon: Diamante
- Loris Palusco: Rodolfo
- Giulia Verdone: Livia Sagonà as a child
- Stefano De Angelis: Vanni Sagonà as a child
- Massimo De Lorenzo: Corrado Santor
- Maria Mercader: elderly lady
