= Viaggi di nozze =

- Directed by: Carlo Verdone
- Written by: Leonardo Benvenuti; Piero De Bernardi; Carlo Verdone
- Produced by: Rita Cecchi Gori; Vittorio Cecchi Gori
- Starring: Carlo Verdone; Claudia Gerini; Cinzia Mascoli; Veronica Pivetti
- Cinematography: Danilo Desideri
- Edited by: Antonio Siciliano
- Music by: Fabio Liberatori
- Production company: Cecchi Gori Group
- Distributed by: Warner Bros. Italia
- Release date: 15 December 1995 (Italy)
- Running time: 1h 43min
- Country: Italy
- Language: Italian
- Box office: $15.7 million (Italy)

Viaggi di nozze (Italian for 'Honeymoons') is a 1995 Italian comedy film directed by Carlo Verdone.

== Plot ==
The film is divided into three stories that mingle during the performance. In the first story, the timid Giovannino is married to Valeria and is about to leave in a cruise ship; but at the last moment Giovannino can not even leave, because he must look after his elderly father, abandoned by the caretaker, while Valeria must think of her sister, who pretends suicide because she wants money from her ex-boyfriend. Their honeymoon turns into a nightmare.

In the second story, Raniero marries Fosca, his second wife. Immediately the honeymoon in Venice becomes tragic, because Raniero's weight is too much for Fosca, although he does not want it, the fact of having to face up to the "perfection" of his first wife, praised by Raniero. In the end, Fosca desperate suicides, just like his first wife.

In the third story, the vulgar Ivano is married to Jessica, and their wedding journey becomes an uncompromising tour of discos. Soon the two realize that they have nothing in common to share because they know too much, and so they invent strategies to learn to "meet" again, without success, sinking into a state of depression and boredom.

== Cast ==
- Carlo Verdone as Raniero / Giovannino / Ivano
- Veronica Pivetti as Fosca
- Claudia Gerini as Jessica Sessa
- Cinzia Mascoli as Valeriana Coli
- Gloria Sirabella as Gloria Coli
- Edoardo Siravo as Stefano
- Nanni Tamma as Adelmo, Giovanni's father
- Maddalena Fellini as Piera, Giovanni's mother
- Gianni Vagliani as Luciano

== Reception ==
The film was number one at the Italian box office for three consecutive weeks and was the most popular Italian film in Italy for the year. It went on to a gross over $15 million.
