= Io e mia sorella =

Io e mia sorella (My sister and I)
- Directed by: Carlo Verdone
- Written by: Leo Benvenuti; Piero De Bernardi; Carlo Verdone
- Produced by: Mario Cecchi Gori; Vittorio Cecchi Gori
- Starring: Carlo Verdone; Ornella Muti; Elena Sofia Ricci; Mariangela Giordano; Galeazzo Benti
- Cinematography: Danilo Desideri
- Edited by: Antonio Siciliano
- Music by: Fabio Liberatori
- Production company: Cecchi Gori Group
- Distributed by: Columbia Pictures Italia
- Release date: 19 December 1987
- Running time: 110 min
- Country: Italy
- Language: Italian

Io e mia sorella (internationally released as Me and My Sister and My Sister and I) is a 1987 Italian romantic comedy-drama film written, directed and starred by Carlo Verdone. For this film Elena Sofia Ricci was awarded with a David di Donatello for Best Supporting Actress and a Silver Ribbon in the same category. The film also won a Silver Ribbon for best actress (Ornella Muti) and a David di Donatello for Best Script.

== Plot ==
Serena and Carlo are a happily married couple of musicians, living in Spoleto, Italy. After the death of Carlo's mother, his sister Silvia returns after a long absence and she disrupts the peaceful family balance with her carefree and self-centered attitude. The woman has kept changing jobs and location across countries, leaving unsettled matters and relationships everywhere, borrowing money around and getting into troubles with the law. She has left her relatives without news for years, she has abandoned her Italian husband without completing the paperwork to allow his filing for a divorce, she has similarly eloped and then suddenly abandoned a much older lover, a successful lawyer who was about to leave for her his own wife and adult children. It also turns out that she has also married a second time with a young athlete in Hungary with whom she also had a baby, Zoltan. They too have been suddenly abandoned without explanations though. After being eventually tracked down at Carlo's house by the Hungarian authorities, Silvia tries once again to escape and to leave all her responsibilities behind. Carlo manages to reach her on the train, and to convince Silvia to return to her second husband and child abroad. They travel to Budapest together, and there they discover that the man has had meanwhile a severe car accident, and he can no longer walk. Being unable to take care of the baby due to his handicap or to contact the wife and mother of his child for help, he had to leave him at an institute for orphans. Suddenly Silvia decides to want Zoltan as her own baby, and his father is willing to give him up, in order to offer the child a better life growing up in Italy. The Hungarian authorities however are concerned about the reliability of Silvia as a mother, and refuse her claims to full custody, also due to another scene in front of the judge. Silvia decides to kidnap the child, and she eventually manages to convince Carlo's too to help with the plan. This also involves his betrayal of his own wife Serena, in order to seduce a nurse at the institute as a distraction. Brother and sister are successful and manage to flee back to Italy, where they contact Silvia's much older lover for legal and practical support. The man once more accepts to help Silvia and to take in Zoltan as a step child, promising as well to support his naturalization as an Italian citizen. After three months of peace, Carlo is suddenly contacted again by the lawyer. Silvia has escaped once more, abandoning both him and the child in order to start yet another relationship with David, a rock musician she just met at a concert. The lawyer gives up on her and returns to his own wife, leaving the baby with Carlo and Serena. The couple tries to keep up with the new responsibilities but struggles to take care of Zoltan in the middle of all their professional commitments. This situation continues to create extra strain within their own relationship. When Silvia suddenly gets back in touch, they are relieved to hear about her request to have the baby brought back to her, this time to Brighton, United Kingdom where she has followed David. Although concerned and in difficulties to accommodate the request with his own job, Carlo arranges the trip and brings her the baby. When he arrives at the address, he finds however yet another crisis, this time involving the police and an attempted murder case. It turns out that David was also already married, and his wife has just shot Silvia out of jealousy. The attack has only injured her slightly though. The rock musician furthermore sides with his wife, and forces Silvia to lie to the police and declare the shooting just an accident during cleanup of the gun, in order to save his own wife from criminal prosecution. This brings an end to Silvia's dreams. She has no further reasons to remain in England, but also no place to return to back in Italy, except for her brother's. She is furthermore pregnant again, without being sure about the father's identity. Carlo travels back to Spoleto with her and Zoltan, and tries to convince his wife Serena to accept his sister and nephew within their own household once more. Although apparently successful, Serena cannot tolerate the last request, and she suddenly abandons him heartbroken with an insulting note, due to the chaos that Silvia has brought to their life.

== Cast ==
- Carlo Verdone: Carlo Piergentili
- Ornella Muti: Silvia Piergentili
- Elena Sofia Ricci: Serena Piergentili
- Mariangela Giordano: Nadia
- Galeazzo Benti: Lawyer Sironi
- Tomas Arana: Gábor
- Veronica Lazar: Judge

== Home video ==
The film was released on DVD in 2006 by Cecchi Gori Home Video. The VHS was released in 1988.
