= Love Is Eternal While It Lasts =

- Directed by: Carlo Verdone
- Written by: Carlo Verdone; Pasquale Plastino
- Produced by: Vittorio Cecchi Gori
- Starring: Laura Morante; Carlo Verdone; Stefania Rocca; Rodolfo Corsato; Gabriella Pession; Antonio Catania
- Cinematography: Danilo Desideri
- Edited by: Antonio Siciliano
- Music by: Fabio Liberatori
- Release date: 2004
- Running time: 114 min
- Country: Italy
- Language: Italian

Love Is Eternal While It Lasts (Italian: L'amore è eterno finché dura, also known as Love Is Eternal, as Long as It Lasts) is a 2004 Italian romantic comedy film written, directed and starred by Carlo Verdone. For her performance Laura Morante won the Nastro d'Argento for Best Actress.

== Plot ==
Gilberto is an optician who has grown dissatisfied with his marriage. His wife Tiziana, a psychologist, is too neurotic, and his daughter Marta is going through typical adolescent difficulties and has grown withdrawn with family and school. Gilberto attends a speed-dating event, meeting various strangers and making up for the occasion a fake story, claiming to be a widower. Among various strange characters, he seems to encounter a charming girl, Stella, who also reciprocates his interest, but the occasion is cut short. The day after Gilberto is summoned by the police, together with the other participants to the event, because Stella has gone missing. Tiziana discovers this way his lie and extra-conjugal adventure, and makes a big scene, no longer trusting her husband. He is thrown out of his house, but finds hospitality with his friend Andrea and his wife, Carlotta. They get along very well, but it also becomes clear that Carlotta too is dissatisfied with the husband's controlling attitude. Although trying to support Gilberto also in creating some new relationships, she gets progressively attracted by the man, and eventually betrays with him Andrea. At the same time, it turns out that Tiziana too had been having an affair, on a much larger scale than Gilberto's flirting with some strangers. Gilberto gives up on her, but their daughter Marta is also severely hit by the loss of trust toward all authority figures within the family. She starts dating a boy from school and seems to grow quickly more independent through the crisis, eventually starting to take courage in facing life and the uncertain future ahead. Carlotta and Gilberto continue to see each others, and appear to find some mutually acceptable arrangement in an open relationship. Andrea tries dating Stella, but that relationship too ends up badly.

== Cast ==
- Carlo Verdone: Gilberto Mercuri
- Laura Morante: Tiziana Lombardi
- Stefania Rocca: Carlotta
- Rodolfo Corsato: Andrea
- Lucia Ceracchi: Marta Mercuri
- Gabriella Pession: Stella
- Antonio Catania: Guido
- Elisabetta Rocchetti: Carolina

== See also ==
- List of Italian films of 2004
