= Mario Brega =

Italian actor (1923–1994)

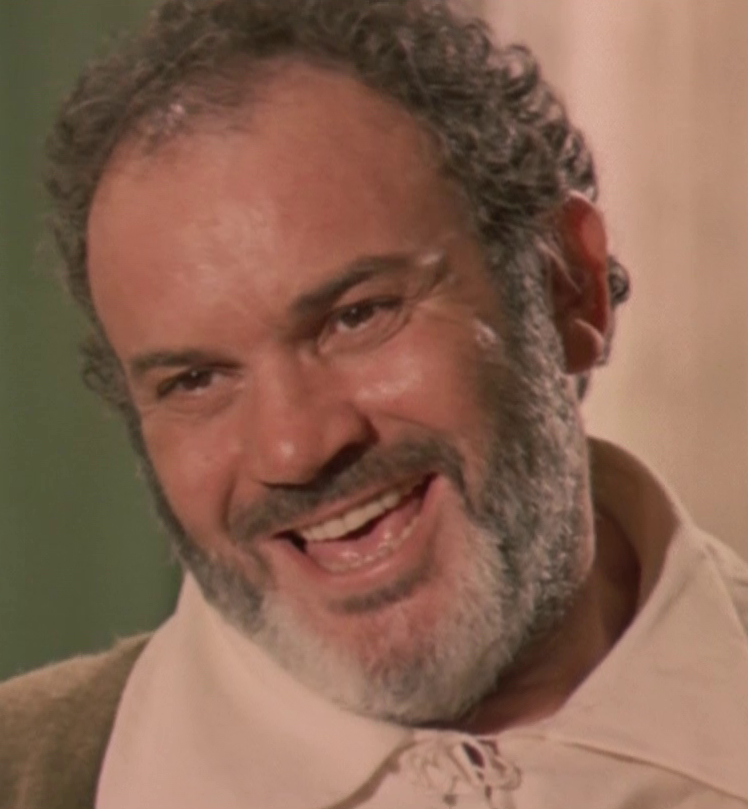
- Brega in Scaramouche (1973)
- Born: Florestano Brega; 25 March 1923; Rome, Kingdom of Italy
- Died: 23 July 1994 (aged 71); Rome, Italy
- Occupation: Actor
- Years active: 1947–1991
- Height: 1.93 m (6 ft 4 in)

Florestano "Mario" Brega (25 March 1923 – 23 July 1994) was an Italian character actor. His heavy build meant that he regularly portrayed a thug in his films, particularly earlier in his career in westerns. Later in his career, however, he featured in numerous Italian comedy films. Brega stood at 6 feet 4 inches (1.93 m) and well over 250 pounds (110 kg) at his heaviest but after the 1960s slimmed down significantly.

== Biography ==
Brega was born in Rome. He was a butcher before he drifted into acting, where his heavy physique ensured him a plethora of character roles. Debuting with director Dino Risi, he then played some minor roles in Sergio Leone's Spaghetti Western movies: A Fistful of Dollars, as Chico; For a Few Dollars More, as Niño; The Good, the Bad and the Ugly as Corporal Wallace; and also as a gangster in Once Upon a Time in America. He appeared in many other Spaghetti Westerns, including Death Rides a Horse, The Great Silence, and My Name is Nobody. Later in his career he had comical roles with director Carlo Verdone, such as in Un sacco bello and Talcum Powder.

He died of a heart attack in Rome in 1994.

== Filmography ==
- La mascotte dei diavoli blu (1947)
- A Man of Straw (1958) – Man who blocks Andrea davanti versus the driver (uncredited)
- World of Miracles (1959) – Man with a black eye (uncredited)
- Gli scontenti (1961)
- Day by Day, Desperately (1961)
- Eighteen in the Sun (1962)
- I motorizzati (1962) – Edoardo
- March on Rome of Dino Risi (1962) – Mitraglia
- The Girl from Parma (1963) – Brega – policeman (uncredited)
- Uno strano tipo (1963)
- The Hours of Love (1963)
- The Scapegoat (1963)
- I mostri (episodio La nobile arte) (1963) – Rocchetti (segment "La nobile Arte")
- Let's Talk About Women (1964)
- Two Mafiamen in the Far West (1964) – Uomo con Rio
- A Fistful of Dollars (1964, by Sergio Leone) – Chico
- Buffalo Bill, Hero of the Far West (1964) – Big Sam Donaldson
- I complessi (1965) – (segment "Il complesso della schiava nubiana")
- For a Few Dollars More (1965, by Sergio Leone) – Nino (Indio's Gang)
- An Angel for Satan (1966) – Carlo Lionesi
- The Ugly Ones (1966) – Miguel
- The Good, the Bad and the Ugly (1966, by Sergio Leone) – Corporal Wallace
- Date for a Murder (1967) – Mario Galante
- No Diamonds for Ursula (1967) – Sansone
- Death Rides a Horse by Giulio Petroni (1967) – Walcott's Henchman in Waistcoat
- Hallelujah for Django (1967) – Andreas / Yanaro
- A Minute to Pray, a Second to Die (1968) – Krant
- Il suo nome gridava vendetta (1968) – Dirty
- The Girl Who Couldn't Say No (1968) – Cripple
- The Great Silence by Sergio Corbucci (1968) – Martin
- A Noose for Django (1969) – Brandon's Partner
- Death Knocks Twice (1969) – Riccardo Beni
- The Reward's Yours... The Man's Mine di Edoardo Mulargia (1969) – Tim
- The Divorce (1970) – Newsvendor
- Cannabis (1970)
- Gang War (1971) – Bellacque
- Se t'incontro t'ammazzo (1971) – Grendel
- Return of Sabata (1971) – Cameo (uncredited)
- In Prison Awaiting Trial (1971) – Detenuto amico di Scalia (uncredited)
- A Girl in Australia (1971) – Cameriere italiano a Brisbane (uncredited)
- Decameron No. 2 - Le altre novelle del Boccaccio di Mino Guerrini (1972) – Ferondo
- Sotto a chi Tocca! (1972) – Fregonese
- Le mille e una notte e un'altra ancora… (1973) – Vizier
- I racconti di Canterbury N. 2 (1973)
- Even Angels Eat Beans (1973) – Angelo's Weapon Master (uncredited)
- Da Scaramouche or se vuoi l'assoluzione baciar devi sto... cordone! (1973)
- My Name Is Nobody (1973) – Pedro
- Basta con la guerra, facciamo l'amore (1974) – Garozzi
- Charleston (1974) – Barman
- I sette del gruppo selvaggio by Gianni Crea (1975) – Tornado
- Convoy Buddies di Giuliano Carnimeo (1975) – Gang Member
- Due cuori, una cappella (1975) – Il macellaio
- Quant'è bella la Bernarda, tutta nera, tutta calda by Lucio Dandolo (1975) – Mirafiore (segment "Il Cavalier Mirafiore")
- A Genius, Two Partners and a Dupe (1975) – Officer at Fort
- The Last Round (1976) – Bobo Belmondo
- Destruction Force (1977) – Questore Alberti
- The Cat (1977) – Killer
- Agonas horis telos (1978)
- A Dangerous Toy (1979) – Un rapinatore
- Fun Is Beautiful di Carlo Verdone (1980) – Mario
- Bianco, rosso e Verdone by Carlo Verdone (1981) – The 'Prince'
- Una vacanza del cactus (1981) – Zio Michele, zio di Augusto
- Pierino la Peste alla riscossa (1982) – Giulio, padre di Pierino
- Talcum Powder by Carlo Verdone (1982) – Augusto
- Pè sempe (1982) – Don Enrico
- Occhio, malocchio, prezzemolo e finocchio (segment: Il mago, 1983) – Alberigo
- Vacanze di Natale (1983) – Arturo Marchetti
- Amarsi un po' (1984) – Augusto Coccia
- Sogni e bisogni (1984) – Er Policlinico
- Once Upon a Time in America by Sergio Leone (1984) – Mandy
- Troppo forte di Carlo Verdone (1986) – Sergio
- Detective School Dropouts (1986) – Don Lombardi
- Montecarlo Gran Casinò (1987) – Luciano
- Crack (1991) – (final film role)
