= Raffaella Leone =

Italian film producer (born 1961 or 1962)

- Born: 1961 or 1962 (age 64–65)
- Occupation: Film producer
- Years active: 1981–present
- Children: 2
- Father: Sergio Leone
- Relatives: Roberto Roberti (paternal grandfather); Bice Waleran (paternal grandmother)

Raffaella Leone (Italian pronunciation: [raffaˈɛlla leˈoːne]; born 1961 or 1962) is an Italian film producer. She is a co-CEO of Leone Film Group, which was founded by her father, film director Sergio Leone.

== Biography ==
Leone was born to film director Sergio Leone and ballet dancer Carla Ranaldi. She has a brother, Andrea, and a sister, Francesca. She and her siblings spent several childhood summers in Spain on the set of their father's films, including A Fistful of Dollars (1964), For a Few Dollars More (1965), and The Good, the Bad and the Ugly (1966). After completing high school, she enrolled at the Accademia di costume e di moda in Rome.

She began her career as a costume designer on Carlo Verdone's films Bianco, rosso e Verdone (1981) and Troppo forte (1986), both of which her father produced. After her father's death in 1989, she and her brother took over Leone Film Group, their father's production company. She has since headed Lotus Production, a subsidiary of Leone Film Group. In 2018, she was named in Variety's International Women's Impact Report.

=== Personal life ===
Leone has two sons: Francesco and Federico.

== Filmography ==
=== Film ===
Year	Title	Director	Notes	Ref.
2009	Generation 1000 Euros	Massimo Venier	Producer	
2012	Playing for Keeps	Gabriele Muccino	Co-producer	
2013	Amiche da morire	Giorgia Farina	Producer	
2015	Fathers and Daughters	Gabriele Muccino	Co-producer	
2020	The Best Years	Gabriele Muccino	Producer	
2022	Sbagliata ascendente leone	Bendo	Producer	
2023	Il migliore dei mondi	Danilo Carlani, Alessio Dogana, Maccio Capatonda	Producer	
2024	Another Summer Holiday	Paolo Virzì	Producer	
2024	Here Now	Gabriele Muccino	Producer	
2025	Madly	Paolo Genovese	Producer	
2026	Le cose non dette	Gabriele Muccino	Producer	
2026	Love Me, Love Me	Roger Kumble	Producer	
2026	Un bel giorno	Fabio De Luigi	Producer	
2026	Paper Tiger	James Gray	Producer	
2026	Il rumore delle cose nuove	Paolo Genovese	Producer	

=== Television ===
Year	Title	Network	Notes	Ref.
2023	The Lions of Sicily	Netflix	Producer	
2024	Wonderboys: The Secret Treasure of Naples	Disney+	Producer	
