= Claudia Gerini =

Italian actress and showgirl (born 1971)

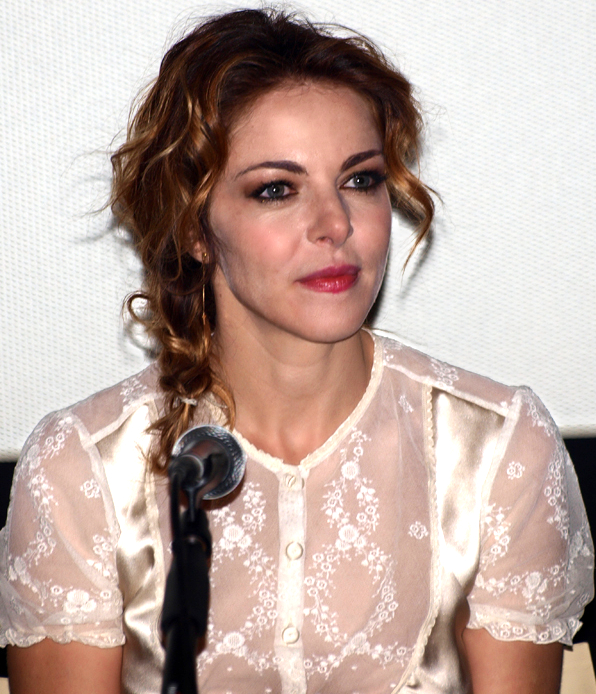
- Gerini in 2012
- Born: 18 December 1971 (age 54); Rome, Italy
- Occupations: Actress; singer
- Partners: Alessandro Enginoli (2002–2004); Federico Zampaglione (2004–2016); Riccardo Sangiuliano (2024–present)
- Children: 2

Claudia Gerini (Italian: [ˈklaudja dʒeˈriːni]; born 18 December 1971) is an Italian actress and singer.

== Life and career ==
Gerini was born in Rome, Italy, in 1971. When she was 13 she won the 1985 Miss Teenager beauty contest. Her acting debut came a year later in La ballata di Eva. She then had various roles in films including Roba da Ricchi (1987), directed by Sergio Corbucci. In 1990, when she was 19, she appeared on the popular TV show Non è la Rai. Gerini's first major role was in Pasquale Pozzessere's Il padre e il figlio (1994).

She later moved to Paris to learn French for several months, frequently travelling between Italy and France while still studying sociology at university. At 22 she returned to Italy and got a role as protagonist in Angelo e Beatrice, a theatrical work by Francesco Apolloni presented on stage at the Theater Coliseum in Rome, where director and actor Carlo Verdone noticed her. The encounter with Verdone produced Viaggi di nozze (1995), her breakthrough role with the broader Italian public for which she abandoned her sociology studies. The following year, she again worked with Verdone in I'm Crazy About Iris Blond. Both films were Christmas box-office successes.

Gerini later collaborated with Leonardo Pieraccioni, Massimo Ceccherini, Antonio Rezza and Antonello De Leo.

She has said Los Angeles is one of her favourite cities and has frequented it for many years. She lived there when she was 25 to be with her boyfriend, and later, when the father of her daughter, Linda, singer-songwriter Federico Zampaglione of the pop group Tiromancino, was recording a studio album there.

In Spain she starred in Desafinado by M. G. Pereira and La playa de Los Galagos by M. Camus.

Other roles include Francesca e Nunziata, directed by Lina Wertmüller. She also appeared in La sconosciuta (2006) and other films directed by her then-partner Zampaglione.

== Personal life ==
Gerini is the mother of two daughters; Linda, with former partner Federico Zampaglione, and Rosa, with former partner Alessandro Enginoli. Between 2019 and 2021 she dated Simon Clementi, a relationship that was briefly rekindled in 2023. Since 2024, she has been dating Riccardo Sangiuliano.

== Awards and nominations ==
- 2014: Nominated to David di Donatello for Best Supporting Actress for her performance in Blame Freud
- 2018: Won David di Donatello for Best Supporting Actress for her performance in Love and Bullets.

== Filmography ==
=== Films ===
Year	Title	Role(s)	Notes
1987	Roba da ricchi	Jessica Petruccelli	Segment: "Secondo episodio"
1988	Ciao ma'…	Gloria	
1989	Night Club	Cristina	
1992	L'Atlantide	Sophie	
1994	Father and Son	Chiara	
1995	Viaggi di nozze	Gessica	
1995	L'anno prossimo vado a letto alle dieci	Mirko's girlfriend	
1996	Escoriandoli	Lauretta	
1996	I'm Crazy About Iris Blond	Iris	
1997	Fireworks	Lorenza	
1999	Lucignolo	Fatima	
1999	La vespa e la regina	Ginevra	
1999	All the Moron's Men	Stella Leone	
2001	Amarsi può darsi	Giulia	
2001	HS Hors Service	Hélène	
2003	Under the Tuscan Sun	Mrs. Raguzzi	
2003	Sinbad: Legend of the Seven Seas	Lady Marina (voice)	Italian dub; voice role
2003	Instructing the Heart	Lorenza Sacchetti	
2004	The Passion of the Christ	Claudia Procles	
2004	Don't Move	Elsa	
2004	Guardians of the Clouds	Nannina	
2006	Our Land	Laura	
2006	The Unknown Woman	Valeria Adacher	
2006	Secret Journey	Adele	
2007	Nero bifamiliare	Marina	
2008	Grande, grosso e... Verdone	Enza Sessa	
2008	Aspettando il sole	Giulia	
2009	Many Kisses Later	Elisa	
2009	Different from Whom?	Adele	
2009	Meno male che ci sei	Luisa	
2010	Toy Story 3	Barbie (voice)	Italian dub; voice role
2011	Il mio domani	Monica	
2012	The Legend of Kaspar Hauser	Duchess	
2012	Love Is in the Air	Giulia	
2012	Reality	TV host	Cameo appearance
2012	Garibaldi's Lovers	Teresa	
2012	Tulpa	Lisa Boeri	
2012	A Perfect Family	Carmen	
2013	Amiche da morire	Gilda	
2013	Guess Who's Coming for Christmas?	Chiara Sereni	
2014	Blame Freud	Claudia	
2014	Maldamore	Lidia	
2015	L'esigenza di unirmi ogni volta con te	Giuliana	
2016	Best Enemies Forever	Fabiola	
2016	Il traduttore	Anna	
2017	John Wick: Chapter 2	Gianna D'Antonio	
2017	Nove lune e mezza	Livia Palumbo	
2017	Ammore e malavita	Donna Maria	
2018	There's No Place Like Home	Beatrice	
2019	Dolceroma	Helga	
2019	Detective per caso	Detective Ramona	
2019	A mano disarmata	Federica Angeli	
2019	I'm Not a Killer	Paola	
2019	The Poison Rose	Adult Violet	
2020	Hammamet	The Lover	
2020	Anna Rosenberg	Anna Rosenberg	
2020	Burraco fatale	Irma	
2021	Diabolik	Mrs. Morel	
2021	Sulla giostra	Irene	
2021	Per tutta la vita	Viola	
2021	Breaking Up in Rome	Elena Veneziani	
2022	Tapirulàn	Emma	Also director
2022	La bambola di pezza	Amelia	Short film
2022	Ta'igara: An adventure in the Himalayas	Miss Hannah	
2023	The Best Days	Margherita Spinesi	
2023	The Order of Time	Elsa	
2023	The Well	Emma	
2024	Il corpo	Rebecca	
2024	U.S. Palmese	Adele Ferraro	

=== Television ===
Year	Title	Role(s)	Notes
1991	Classe di ferro	Claudia	Episode: "La sfida"
1991	Un bambino in fuga	Luisa's friend	Episode: "Episode 3"
1991–1992	Non è la RAI	Herself / Contestant	Variety show (season 1)
1993	Gioco perverso	Evelina	Television film
1995	Femme de passions	Paola	Television film
1997	Mai dire Gol	Herself / Guest host	Sports/comedy program (season 7)
1998	Sotto la luna	Giulia	Television movie
2000	Milano-Roma	Herself / Guest	Reality show (season 4)
2001	L'ottavo nano	Fairy with Turquoise Hair	3 episodes
2001	Francesca e Nunziata	Nunziata	Television film
2003	Sanremo Music Festival 2003	Herself / co-host	Annual music festival
2003	Camera Café	Titti	Recurring role; 4 episodes
2006	48 ore	Marta De Maria	Main role; 12 episodes
2009	Così fan tutte	Various	Sketch comedy series
2009	Le segretarie del sesto	Agnese Di Maggio	Miniseries
2012	Labyrinth	Marie-Cecile	Miniseries
2012	Amici di Maria De Filippi	Herself / Guest judge	Talent show (final stage, season 11)
2014	La pista	Herself / Judge	Talent show
2015	Zio Gianni	Herself (cameo)	Episode: "Gianni cyrano"
2016–2017	Dance Dance Dance	Herself / Contestant	Runner-up (season 1)
2017–2020	Suburra: Blood on Rome	Sara Monaschi	Main role (seasons 1–2), guest (season 3); 19 episodes
2018	L'ispettore Coliandro	Melinah Demir	Episode: "Serial killer"
2022	From Scratch	Vittoria Contini	Episode: "First Tastes"
2022	Drag Race Italia	Herself / Guest judge	Episode: "Sporty Queens"
2025	Sara: Woman in the Shadows	Teresa	Main role

=== Stage ===
Year	Title	Role(s)	Director	Theatre
2001	Closer	Alice	Luca Guadagnino	Teatro A. Bonci

=== Video games ===
Year	Title	Role(s)	Notes
2010	Heavy Rain	Madison (voice)	Italian dub; voice role
