= My Best Enemy (2006 film) =

- Film poster
- Italian: Il mio miglior nemico
- Directed by: Carlo Verdone
- Written by: Carlo Verdone; Silvio Muccino; Pasquale Plastino; Silvia Ranfagni
- Produced by: Aurelio De Laurentiis
- Starring: Carlo Verdone; Silvio Muccino; Ana Caterina Morariu; Agnese Nano
- Cinematography: Danilo Desideri
- Music by: Paolo Buonvino
- Release date: 10 March 2006
- Running time: 110 minutes
- Country: Italy
- Language: Italian

My Best Enemy (Italian: Il mio miglior nemico) is a 2006 Italian comedy film directed by Carlo Verdone.

== Plot summary ==
Achille De Bellis is a wealthy manager of a large hotel chain, property of the family of his wife Gigliola for generations.

While Gigliola is struggling with the preparations for their 25th wedding anniversary party, Achille fires a chronically depressed hotel maid (Annarita) for the theft of an expensive laptop. Annarita's son Orfeo, a 24 year old waiter stressed by his mother's depressive crises and by their unhappy economic situation, pleads with Achille to no avail.

Embittered and angered by Achille's indifference to his plight, the young waiter decides to ruin Achille, he follows him to a secluded place outside the city, and he takes photos of Achille with his young and attractive sister-in-law Ramona. Orfeo persecutes the two lovers through intimidation and small acts of vandalism, until he openly threatens Achille to reveal his affair. Meanwhile, following a traffic accident, Orfeo meets Cecilia, with whom he quickly falls in love. Orfeo, unaware that Cecilia is Achille's daughter, crashes Achille and Gigliola's anniversary party, distributing compromising photos of Achille and Ramona.

Cecilia, shaken and disgusted by her father's hypocrisy and by Orfeo's gesture, leaves the party and disappears.

After Orfeo's mother confesses that she is indeed guilty of the laptop theft, Orfeo and Achille decide to join forces and set off in search of Cecilia.

After the umpteenth quarrel, they split, Achille following a lead to Istanbul, Orfeo to Switzerland. Orfeo finds the girl working as a waitress in Geneva, at the Grand Cafè Istanbul, where they make peace. To please Achille, the two travel to Turkey, to let Achille believe that his hunch was correct.

The story ends with a tender photo of father and daughter, taken by Orfeo, who sees in the trio his new, true family.

== Cast ==
- Carlo Verdone - Achille De Bellis
- Silvio Muccino - Orfeo Rinalduzzi
- Ana Caterina Morariu - Cecilia De Bellis
- Agnese Nano - Gigliola Duranti
- Paolo Triestino - Guglielmo Duranti
- Corinne Jiga - Ramona
- Sara Bertelà - Annarita Rinalduzzi
- Leonardo Petrillo - Riccardo
- Marco Guadagno - meccanico
