= Me, Them and Lara =

2010 Italian comedy film

- Film poster
- Italian: Io, loro e Lara
- Directed by: Carlo Verdone
- Written by: Carlo Verdone; Francesca Marciano; Pasquale Plastino
- Starring: Carlo Verdone; Laura Chiatti; Anna Bonaiuto; Marco Giallini; Sergio Fiorentini; Angela Finocchiaro
- Cinematography: Danilo Desideri
- Edited by: Claudio Di Mauro
- Music by: Fabio Liberatori
- Distributed by: Warner Bros. Pictures
- Release date: 5 January 2010 (Italy)
- Running time: 112 minutes
- Country: Italy
- Language: Italian

Me, Them and Lara (Italian: Io, loro e Lara) is a 2010 Italian comedy film directed by Carlo Verdone.

== Cast ==
- Carlo Verdone as father Carlo Mascolo
- Laura Chiatti as Lara Vasilescu
- Anna Bonaiuto as Beatrice Mascolo
- Marco Giallini as Luigi Mascolo
- Sergio Fiorentini as Alberto Mascolo
- Angela Finocchiaro as Doctor Elisa Draghi
- Olga Balan as Olga Vasilescu
- Tamara Di Giulio as Eva
- Agnese Claisse as Aida
- Nimata Carla Akakpo as Hakira
- Cristina Odasso as Mirella Agnello
- Giorgia Cardaci as Francesca
- Marco Guadagno as father Giulio
- Roberto Sbaratto as father Savastano
