= Talcum Powder (film) =

- Directed by: Carlo Verdone
- Written by: Carlo Verdone; Enrico Oldoini
- Produced by: Mario Cecchi Gori; Vittorio Cecchi Gori
- Starring: Carlo Verdone; Eleonora Giorgi
- Cinematography: Ennio Guarnieri
- Edited by: Antonio Siciliano
- Music by: Lucio Dalla; Fabio Liberatori; Stadio
- Distributed by: Cecchi Gori Group
- Release date: 1982
- Running time: 96 minutes
- Country: Italy
- Language: Italian

Talcum Powder (Original title: Borotalco) is a 1982 Italian romantic comedy film written, starring and directed by Carlo Verdone.

The film received multiple David di Donatello awards in Italy for Best Film, Best Actor, Best Actress, Best Score and Best Supporting Actor (to Angelo Infanti). It also won Silver Ribbons for Best Actress and for Best Score.

== Plot summary ==
Sergio Benvenuti (Carlo Verdone) is a meek and timid young man who works as a door-to-door salesman; naturally, his disposition makes incredibly hard for him to convince potential customers to subscribe to the offers he peddles.

Desperate to improve his sales' rate, he asks for the help of a more outgoing and successful colleague, Nadia, who agrees to take him with her to 'show him the ropes' of a successful sales pitch.

Due to a mishap Sergio reaches alone the abode of a colorful, over-the-top character, who introduces himself as 'Manuel Fantoni' and entertains him with tall tales about his incredible life and his intimate acquaintance with lots of Italian and American celebrities.

Oblivious of the appointment with the belated Nadia, Sergio is fascinated by Manuel's stories and spend the day listening to him, and believing everything, until the sudden arrival of the police to arrest the strange character. 'Manuel' is revealed to actually be 'Cesare Cuticchia', a much-less-glamorous petty criminal, guilty of a series of misdemeanors>

Before being led away in manacles, Manuel/Cesare asks Sergio to 'keep an eye' on his house. For the timid young man this is the chance to "impersonate" Manuel, and to play, for once in his life, the role of the uber-cool, mysterious and affluent romantic anti-hero. At this point Nadia arrives to the appointment. Since she has never seen him in person, Sergio manages to easily assume the new fake identity, and he fascinates her by repeating the same tall tales. He also boast personal friendship with her favorite singer Lucio Dalla, hugely successful at the time. Being a huge fan of the performer, Nadia begs Sergio/Manuel to arrange their meeting, in the hope to also propose to Dalla a few new songs of her own and maybe get a head-start as a musician herself.

Caught in his own web of lies, Sergio doesn't dare to reveal the truth and tries to buy time with excuses. Meanwhile he rushes to visit Giuseppe in jail, asking him for advice and support in order not to disappoint the girl and therefore spoil his own romantic chances with her.

Giuseppe of course laughs at Sergio's request, and reveals that all the signed photos in his apartment, including Lucio Dalla's, aren't evidence of any special familiarity within the show business in general or with that singer in particular. They simply hark back from a time when Giuseppe owned a small restaurant with many actors and musicians as customers, who often settled the bill by leaving their autographs. Nevertheless the shrewd and cunning con-man urges Sergio to keep the pretense up in order to bed Nadia, and to reveal only later the truth. This way of dealing with the situation appears to both intrigue and repel Sergio. For a while he continues the pretense of being Manuel, although this adds complications also in his own dealings with his fiance Rossella, a plain girl of modest culture and little charm, who wants desperately to marry him. Sergio has grown to loathe the idea, but he is also afraid of disappointing the expectations of Rossella's burly, coarse and violent father, Augusto (Mario Brega). Sergio continues with his attempt to seduce Nadia and to play the part of Manuel, as a last adventure before the unglamorous marriage. In the end a romantic dinner with Nadia is crashed by the thunderous arrival of Augusto and Rossella at Cesare's apartment, which culminates in Sergio's savage beating during which his true identity is revealed to both women.

Nadia leaves the premises entirely disillusioned. Several years later Sergio will meet her again, and they both find the other one caught up in a life which they don't enjoy. They finally exchange a deep, passionate and sincere kiss.

== Cast ==
- Carlo Verdone: Sergio Benvenuti
- Eleonora Giorgi: Nadia Vandelli
- Christian De Sica: Marcello
- Angelo Infanti: Cesare Cuticchia alias Manuel Fantoni
- Roberta Manfredi: Rossella
- Mario Brega: Augusto
- Isa Gallinelli: Valeria
- Enrico Papa: Cristiano
- Isabella De Bernardi: Agente di Vendita

== See also ==
- List of Italian films of 1982
