= Barbara Matera (politician) =

Italian actress, tv presenter, and politician

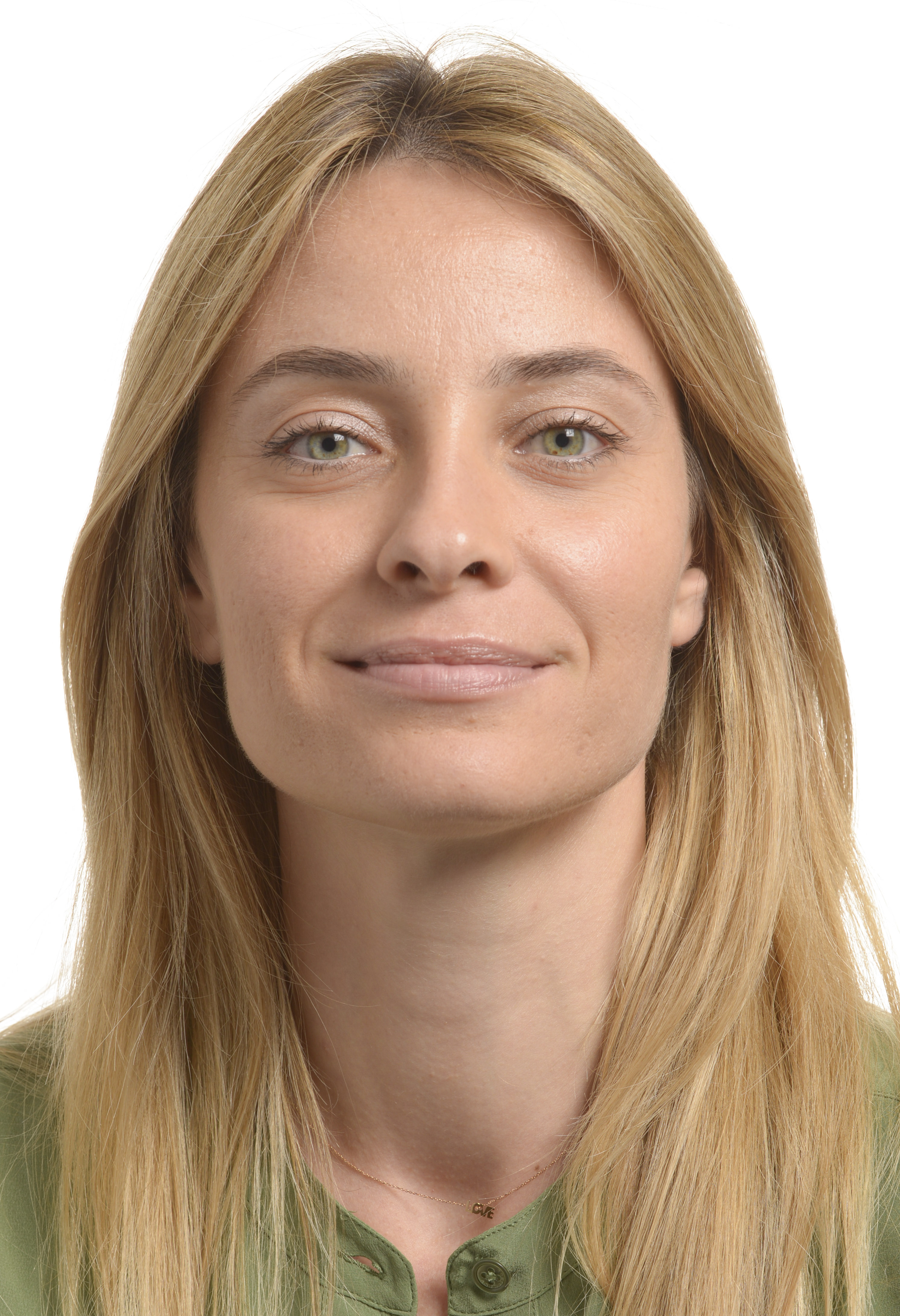
- Born: 9 December 1981 (age 44); Lucera, Italy
- Occupations: Politician; Actress; Television announcer
- Years active: 2001–present

Barbara Matera (born 9 December 1981) is an Italian television announcer, actress and Member of the European Parliament for the centre-right People of Freedom party.

== Biography ==
Barbara Matera was born on 9 December 1981 in Lucera in Italy. She studied Educational Sciences at the University of Rome La Sapienza.

In 2000, she was a participant at the Miss Italia Italian beauty contest.

Later, in September 2003, she became an announcer for Rai Uno, the primary television station of RAI, Italy's state-owned national public service broadcaster. She remained with RAI until 2007.

In 2003, she appeared in the film Ma che colpa abbiamo noi, directed by and starring Carlo Verdone. In 2007, she starred in the role of a journalist in the Rai Uno miniseries La Terza verità, led by Stefano Reali. After that, she held the role of Francesca Rossini on the seventh season of Carabinieri, broadcast on Canale 5, and guest starred in an episode of Don Matteo. In 2009, she appeared in the Canale 5 television film Due mamme di troppo, directed by Antonello Grimaldi.

=== European Parliament election ===
Barbara Matera's candidacy for Member of the European Parliament was presented by Silvio Berlusconi's party, The People of Freedom, in the 2009 European Parliament elections.

She was elected at the European Parliament with 129,994 preference votes.

Barbara Matera is the winner of the Women's Rights and Gender Equality Award, 2017.

== Filmography ==
=== Film ===
Year	Film	Role	Other notes
2003	Ma che colpa abbiamo noi	Danka	English: What Fault Is It of Ours? Directed by Carlo Verdone

=== Television ===
Year	Television series	Role	Other notes
2007	La terza verità		Rai Uno TV miniseries Directed by Stefano Reali
2008	Carabinieri	Francesca Rossini	Aired on Canale 5
2008	Don Matteo	Laura	Guest appearance
2009	Due mamme di troppo	Viola	Canale 5 television film Directed by Antonello Grimaldi
