= Manual of Love =

- Italian poster
- Directed by: Giovanni Veronesi
- Written by: Vincenzo Cerami; Ugo Chiti; Giovanni Veronesi
- Produced by: Aurelio De Laurentiis
- Starring: Carlo Verdone; Silvio Muccino; Luciana Littizzetto; Sergio Rubini; Margherita Buy; Jasmine Trinca
- Cinematography: Giovanni Canevari
- Edited by: Claudio Di Mauro
- Music by: Paolo Buonvino
- Release date: 18 March 2005
- Running time: 116 minutes
- Country: Italy
- Language: Italian

Manual of Love (Italian: Manuale d'amore) is a 2005 Italian blockbuster romantic comedy film in four quartets. It was directed by Giovanni Veronesi, who made two sequels, Manuale d'amore 2 – Capitoli successivi in 2007, and Manuale d'amore 3 in 2011.

== Plot ==
Each of the four episodes follows a different couple, focusing on a particular stage of a typical love relationship:

- Innamoramento (falling in love): Giulia and Tommaso (Jasmine Trinca and Silvio Muccino) meet by chance. He falls in love on the spot; although initially Giulia doesn't return his sentiments, a romantic dinner leads the relationship to bloom and develop into an actual marriage proposal.
- Crisi (crisis): Barbara and Marco (Margherita Buy and Sergio Rubini) are a couple going through a crisis, close to divorce. She is the stereotypical wife, full of initiative which her husband does not share. He on the other hand gets more and more boring in his routine.
- Tradimento (cheating): A traffic police woman named Ornella (Luciana Littizzetto) is cheated on by her husband and takes revenge on all other drivers. Her severity and strict enforcement of all regulations builds her a reputation in Rome. Eventually she too has an extra-conjugal affair, after which marriage and wife get back together.
- Abbandono (break-up): Goffredo (Carlo Verdone) is a rich doctor abandoned by his wife Margherita. After many attempts to win back her love, Goffredo gives up. When Goffredo's desperation has reachest the darkest point, he meets Livia, Tommaso's sister. They open up to each others as good friends, and the movie ends with the duo going for a walk on the beach, awaiting for a date which for both seems a promising development in their life.

The characters in the movie are all related in one way or another, and each transition brings background characters from a previous episode to be the protagonists of the next episode. The film is set in Rome.

== Cast ==
- Carlo Verdone: Goffredo
- Luciana Littizzetto: Ornella
- Silvio Muccino: Tommaso
- Sergio Rubini: Marco
- Margherita Buy: Barbara
- Jasmine Trinca: Giulia
- Rodolfo Corsato: Alberto Marchese
- Dino Abbrescia: Gabriele
- Dario Bandiera: Piero
- Luis Molteni: avvocato di Goffredo
- Sabrina Impacciatore: Luciana
- Anita Caprioli: Livia
- Francesco Mandelli: Dante

== Awards ==
- 2 Nastro d'Argento: Best Supporting Actor (Carlo Verdone), Best Screenplay.
- 2 David di Donatello Best Supporting Actor (Carlo Verdone), Best Supporting Actress (Margherita Buy).
