= Grande, grosso e... Verdone =

- Directed by: Carlo Verdone
- Starring: Carlo Verdone; Claudia Gerini; Eva Riccobono; Geppi Cucciari
- Cinematography: Danilo Desideri
- Release date: 7 March 2008 (Italy)
- Running time: 2h 15min
- Country: Italy
- Language: Italian

Grande, grosso e... Verdone is a 2008 Italian comedy film directed by Carlo Verdone.

== Plot ==
Carlo Verdone once again plays three characters from his comic repertoire: the naive boy, the logor teacher, and the Roman "cafone". In the first episode, Leo is desperate for his mother's sudden death, and experiences various vicissitudes to organize funeral and burial. At the end of the story Leo discovers with the family that the funeral company, cremating the mother's body, has exchanged the urn with that of a motorcyclist!

In the second episode, the striking Professor Callisto has a possessive relationship with the timid son who never had a girl, and decides to take as a "maid" a college girl to bring about a good relationship of friendship between her and his son. But his son wants to rebel against the father, and abandons him during an excursion to the catacombs of Rome.

In the last story, the vulgar Moreno goes with his family of cafes in a luxury hotel in Taormina, generating the general disapproval of other customers. Moreno between them sees a beautiful girl who tries to conquer in all the ways, eventually discovering she is an escort.

== Cast ==
- Carlo Verdone - Leo Nuvolone / Callisto Cagnato / Moreno Vecchiarutti / L'onorevole
- Claudia Gerini - Enza Sessa
- Eva Riccobono - Blanche Duvall
- Geppi Cucciari - Tecla
- Emanuele Propizio - Steven Vecchiarutti
- Andrea Miglio Risi - Severiano Cagnato
- Martina Pinto - Lucilla Diotiallevi
- Nicola Di Gioia - Otello
- Roberto Farnesi - Fabio Muso
