= It Can't Be All Our Fault =

- Directed by: Carlo Verdone
- Written by: Carlo Verdone; Piero De Bernardi
- Produced by: Vittorio Cecchi Gori
- Starring: Carlo Verdone; Margherita Buy; Anita Caprioli; Stefano Pesce; Lucia Sardo; Antonio Catania; Massimiliano Amato; Luciano Gubinelli; Sergio Graziani
- Cinematography: Danilo Desideri
- Edited by: Claudio Di Mauro
- Music by: Lele Marchitelli
- Production companies: Warner Bros. Pictures; Virginia Film Srl
- Distributed by: Warner Bros. Pictures
- Release date: 10 January 2003
- Running time: 120 minutes
- Country: Italy
- Language: Italian

It Can't Be All Our Fault (Italian: Ma che colpa abbiamo noi) is a 2003 Italian comedy film directed by Carlo Verdone.

== Plot ==
In the study of a psychologist, the eight stars of the film are waiting for placement in the office. However the psychologist dies of a heart attack and so the eight patients should look for a new doctor. But in the end they decide to make a therapy group to better understand their problems.

== Cast ==
- Carlo Verdone as Galeazzo 'Gegè' Tinacci
- Margherita Buy as Flavia
- Anita Caprioli as Chiara
- Antonio Catania as Ernesto
- Lucia Sardo as Gabriella
- Stefano Pesce as Marco
- Massimiliano Amato as Luca
- Luciano Gubinelli as Alfredo
- Sergio Graziani as Camillo Tinacci, Gegé's father
- Raquel Sueiro as Daria
- Corrado Solari as Dr. Tondaro
- Remo Remotti as Butler
- Leonardo Ruta as Attilio
- Barbara Matera as Danka
- Rodolfo Corsato as Aldo
- Lorenzo Balducci as Manuel
- Roberto Accornero as Massimo
- Fabio Traversa as Man Interrupting Funeral
- Corrado Olmi as Priest
