= A Chinese in a Coma =

- Directed by: Carlo Verdone
- Written by: Carlo Verdone; Pasquale Plastino; Giovanni Veronesi
- Produced by: Vittorio Cecchi Gori
- Starring: Carlo Verdone; Giuseppe Fiorello
- Cinematography: Danilo Desideri
- Release date: 1 March 2000 (Italy)
- Running time: 1h 48min
- Country: Italy
- Language: Italian

A Chinese in a Coma (Italian: C'era un cinese in coma) is a 2000 Italian comedy film directed by Carlo Verdone.

== Plot ==
Ercole is a manager in Rome who has to find a new actor for the public, given that his company is in crisis. One day Ercole discovers that his young driver Nicola is very good at telling comic jokes, with little sexual touches, and then he takes advantage of the new idea of a "comedian and sexy" actor to make a success in the entertainment world again. However Nicola, a shy boy, becomes arrogant and spoiled, and slowly destroys the life of his manager.

== Cast ==
- Carlo Verdone - Ercole Preziosi
- Giuseppe Fiorello - Nicola "Niki" Renda
- Marit Nissen - Eva
- Anna Safroncik - Maruska
- Nanni Tamma - Tiepolo
- Giorgia Bongianni - Daniela
- Lucio Caizzi - Rudy Sciacca
- Antonia Liskova - Melanie
