= List of 2010 box office number-one films in Italy =

This is a list of films which have placed number one at the weekend box office in Italy during 2010.

== Number-one films ==
†	This implies the highest-grossing movie of the year.

#	Date	Film	Weekend Gross	Total Gross
1	January 3, 2010	Sherlock Holmes	$6,582,433	$26,955,437
2	January 10, 2010	Me, Them and Lara	$6,753,283	$21,347,896
3	January 17, 2010	Avatar †	$13,889,941	$83,498,193
4	January 24, 2010	Avatar †	$12,383,549	
5	January 31, 2010	Avatar †	$10,357,947	
6	February 7, 2010	Avatar †	$7,783,01	
7	February 14, 2010	Avatar †	$5,181,248	
8	February 21, 2010	Avatar †	$3,767,803	
9	February 28, 2010	Parents and Children: Shake Well Before Using	$3,802,776	$11,455,266
10	March 7, 2010	Alice in Wonderland	$11,115,961	$39,952,697
11	March 14, 2010	Alice in Wonderland	$8,311,436	
12	March 21, 2010	Alice in Wonderland	$4,307,666	
13	March 28, 2010	How to Train Your Dragon	$1,630,412	$9,979,666
14	April 4, 2010	La vita è una cosa meravigliosa	$2,287,044	$6,161,728
15	April 11, 2010	The Ghost Writer	$1,382,472	$4,811,454
16	April 18, 2010	Clash of the Titans	$4,286,144	$10,275,464
17	April 25, 2010	Clash of the Titans	$2,133,330	
18	May 2, 2010	Iron Man 2	$4,701,280	$9,979,666
19	May 9, 2010	Iron Man 2	$2,073,896	
20	May 16, 2010	Robin Hood	$5,172,957	$14,676,791
21	May 23, 2010	Prince of Persia: The Sands of Time	$1,909,536	$8,912,558
22	May 30, 2010	Sex and the City 2	$2,072,658	$7,802,889
23	June 6, 2010	Sex and the City 2	$896,600	
24	June 13, 2010	The Hole	$495,714	$2,094,728
25	June 20, 2010	The A-Team	$1,111,167	$3,143,928
26	June 27, 2010	The A-Team	$396,533	
27	July 4, 2010	The Twilight Saga: Eclipse	$4,793,904	$20,711,944
28	July 11, 2010	Toy Story 3	$3,021,009	$18,855,881
29	July 18, 2010	Toy Story 3	$2,011,511	
30	July 25, 2010	Toy Story 3	$1,245,241	
31	August 1, 2010	Toy Story 3	$838,708	
32	August 8, 2010	Toy Story 3	$500,852	
33	August 15, 2010	Marmaduke	$940,960	$2,503,450
34	August 22, 2010	The Sorcerer's Apprentice	$16,968,032	$9,571,490
35	August 29, 2010	Shrek Forever After	$4,504,291	$23,451,561
36	September 5, 2010	Shrek Forever After	$3,637,448	
37	September 12, 2010	Shrek Forever After	$1,915,433	
38	September 19, 2010	Vampires Suck	$2,483,735	$6,000,711
39	September 26, 2010	Inception	$3,556,167	$15,459,083
40	October 3, 2010	Benvenuti al Sud	$5,231,564	$43,015,634
41	October 10, 2010	Benvenuti al Sud	$6,242,77	
42	October 17, 2010	Benvenuti al Sud	$5,528,640	
43	October 24, 2010	Benvenuti al Sud	$3,889,528	
44	October 31, 2010	Men vs. Women	$4,222,767	$18,452,860
45	November 7, 2010	Men vs. Women	$3,582,226	
46	November 14, 2010	Men vs. Women	$1,869,690	
47	November 21, 2010	Harry Potter and the Deathly Hallows – Part 1	$10,193,771	$23,988,197
48	November 28, 2010	Harry Potter and the Deathly Hallows – Part 1	$4,625,564	
49	December 5, 2010	Tangled	$2,710,588	$14,670,362
50	December 12, 2010	Tangled	$1,918,925	
51	December 19, 2010	Natale in Sudafrica	$4,282,724	$24,898,572
52	December 26, 2010	Natale in Sudafrica	$8,073,079	
53	January 2, 2011	The Santa Claus Gang	$5,763,680	$29,125,119
