= Troppo forte =

- Directed by: Carlo Verdone
- Screenplay by: Sergio Leone; Rodolfo Sonego; Alberto Sordi; Carlo Verdone
- Story by: Sergio Leone; Rodolfo Sonego; Carlo Verdone
- Produced by: Augusto Caminito
- Starring: Carlo Verdone; Stella Hall; John Steiner; Mario Brega; Sal Da Vinci; Alberto Sordi
- Cinematography: Danilo Desideri
- Edited by: Nino Baragli
- Music by: Antonello Venditti
- Production company: Scena Film Production
- Distributed by: Titanus
- Release date: 30 January 1986
- Running time: 110 minutes
- Country: Italy
- Language: Italian

Troppo forte (also known as Great, He's Too Much and Too Much) is a 1986 Italian romantic comedy film directed by Carlo Verdone.

== Plot ==
Oscar Pettinari is a young hick from the suburbs of Rome, who gravitates around Cinecittà trying rather unsuccessfully to impress his acquaintances as well as the producers with the tales of his experiences as a stuntman in Rambo-like action movies. The movie starts when he alone is rejected even as an extra, for the production of an American Sci-Fi movie. While boasting among bystanders about his supposed previous jobs in the movie industry, the disappointed Oscar meets by chance the whimsical lawyer Giangiacomo Pigna Corelli in Selci. The confident laywyer impresses the looser Oscar, who accepts on the spot his suggestion to stage a fake incident and play the victim of a car crash with the foreigner movie producer, in order to blackmail him into either paying damages or offer him a chance as an actor. On the appointed day for the simulation, it turns out however that the producer's car was not driven by him, but his lead actress and lover, Nancy. The young and beautiful Italo-American actress is dismissed and abandoned by the movie production, concerned about possible scandals. She has to face alone, money-less and in a country that she doesn't know the insisting demands of Oscar and his lawyer Giangiacomo, who has no scruples in even arranging some unnecessary surgery in order to get further evidence about the crash.

Oscar however reveals his good-natured soul, and ends up offering the girl hospitality at his home, even making debts in order to try and keep up with her lavish lifestyle. As they spend more time together, it appears that some mutual understanding and possibly even attraction is developing between the two. At the same time, Oscar is grappling with the increasingly frequent and more extreme quirks of his lawyer, who makes him reject a favorable settlement proposal with the movie producer and wants to bring the attempted scam to court. Upon gaining the spotlight and in the middle of a nationalistic, far-fetched harangue, Giangiacomo however faints and then appears amnesiac and entirely unaware of his surroundings.

It turns out that in reality he is nothing more than a mythomaniac, of noble origins but prone of continuous episodes during which he convinces himself and some naive and unlucky victims to be some kind of expert - in this case a lawyer, previously a dentist or a veterinary, and after the last crisis a ballet choreographer. He is looked after and protected by his old mother and aunt, who do not seem to understand or care about the impact of his escapades. Oscar tries in vain to make Giangiacomo recall his promises and commitments, and eventually gives up on him. On the other hand, Nancy eventually finds another chance for resuming her attempts to pursue a serious acting career in the United States. She leaves Oscar without hate for the events, possibly more mature after the experience. Oscar misses her immediately, but returns immediately to his old routine, with questionable tales of heroic stuntman performances and auditions in Cinecittà, now as a copy-cat of Indiana Jones.

== Cast ==
- Carlo Verdone as Oscar Pettinari
- Stella Hall as Nancy
- Alberto Sordi as Giangiacomo Pigna Corelli in Selci
- Sal Da Vinci as Capua
- Mario Brega as Sergio
- John Steiner as Mr. Adams
- Penny Brown as Susan Taylor
- Franca Dominici as Domitilla, Pigna Corelli's mother
- Michele Mirabella as a Lawyer
