= Lele Marchitelli =

Italian composer and musician

- Born: 12 January 1955 (age 71); Rome, Italy
- Occupation: Composer

Daniele Marchitelli (born 12 January 1955), best known as Lele Marchitelli, is an Italian musician and composer.

== Life and career ==
Born in Rome, Marchitelli studied guitar and bass as an autodidact. Between 1976 and 1977, he was a member of the group Americanta. Between late 1970s and early 1980s he collaborated as a bassist to some albums by Maria Carta and Carlo Siliotto and was a member of the group Gramigna.

Starting from 1984, Marchitelli focused on composing, first music for commercials, and later scores for films and television series. He was nominated two times for David di Donatello for best score, and five times for Silver Ribbon for best score.

== Selected filmography ==
- 1987 - Specters
- 1987 - Il grande Blek
- 1992 - Volevamo essere gli U2
- 1996 - I'm Crazy About Iris Blond
- 2000 - Il segreto del giaguaro
- 2001 - Off to the Revolution by a 2CV
- 2003 - It Can't Be All Our Fault
- 2006 - Quale amore
- 2007 - Piano, solo
- 2013 - The Great Beauty
- 2014 - Noi 4
- 2016 - The Young Pope
- 2017 - Spettacolo
- 2018 – Loro
- 2020 - The New Pope
- 2021 - Mare of Easttown
- 2021 - The Hand of God
- 2023 - There's Still Tomorrow
- 2024 - Parthenope
