= Bianco, rosso e Verdone =

- Italian theatrical release poster by Renato Casaro
- Directed by: Carlo Verdone
- Written by: Leonardo Benvenuti; Piero De Bernardi; Carlo Verdone
- Produced by: Sergio Leone
- Starring: Carlo Verdone; Irina Sanpiter; Elena Fabrizi; Angelo Infanti; Milena Vukotic; Mario Brega
- Cinematography: Luciano Tovoli
- Edited by: Nino Baragli
- Music by: Ennio Morricone
- Distributed by: Warner Bros.
- Release date: 20 February 1981
- Running time: 110 minutes
- Country: Italy
- Language: Italian

Bianco, rosso e Verdone (Note: Literally translating to "White, red and Verdone", Verdone replacing verde ("green") as a pun on the Italian flag.) is a 1981 Italian comedy film co-written, directed and starring Carlo Verdone.

It was produced by Sergio Leone, soundtrack composed by Ennio Morricone and co-starred by Mario Brega, all formerly scored in the Dollars trilogy and Spaghetti Western movies in the 1960s.

== Cast ==
- Carlo Verdone as Furio, Mimmo and Pasquale Amitrano
- Irina Sanpiter (dubbed by Solvejg D'Assunta) as Magda, Furio's wife
- Elena Fabrizi as Mimmo's grandmother
- Milena Vukotic as a call-girl
- Mario Brega as "The Prince" truck driver
- Angelo Infanti as Raul the seducer
- Andrea Aureli as Mimmo's Uncle
- Elisabeth Wiener as Pasquale's German wife
- Anna Alessandra Ariorio
- Vittorio Zarfati as the motel doorkeeper
- Giovanni Brusadori
- Guido Monti
- Giuseppe Pezzulli

== Plot ==
It’s election day in early 1980s Italy. Three men set off to cast their votes in their respective hometowns. Furio, a pedantic and overly talkative clerk living in Turin, travels with his family to Rome. Similarly, the simple-minded Mimmo is en route to his polling station with his diabetic grandmother, who depends on his care during the journey. Meanwhile, Pasquale, an Italian immigrant in Germany, nearly mute and married to a stern, Valkyrie-like German woman, sets off alone in his Alfasud for Matera in southern Italy.

Their journeys become a chaotic series of misadventures on the Italian motorways. Furio’s wife, Magda, is driven to the brink of a nervous breakdown by her husband’s obsessive perfectionism, which turns their every move into an over-planned ordeal. Mimmo, meanwhile, is continuously ridiculed and manipulated by his cunning grandmother. Pasquale, blissfully unaware of the dangers around him, is repeatedly targeted by thieves at every stop along the way.

The three groups briefly intersect at a motel where Magda, Mimmo, and their families spend the night. Furio, however, is absent, having ended up in the hospital after a car crash. At the motel, Magda finds herself courted by Raul, a dashing man who has been following her since the start of their journey. Mimmo, in his naivety, is drawn to a call-girl working at the motel. Misunderstanding her profession, he mistakes her pubic hair for “fur underwear” and fails to grasp her intentions entirely. Meanwhile, Pasquale’s car is stripped bare by thieves, leaving him without seats, a windshield, or wheel rims. Yet, undeterred, he soldiers on toward his destination.

Eventually, the three men reach their polling stations. Magda seizes the opportunity to escape with Raul while Furio is distracted, busy voting. Mimmo’s grandmother, determined to cast her vote for the Italian Communist Party, tragically dies in the voting booth. Her death prompts a heated debate among the poll workers about the validity of her vote, while Mimmo sobs over her death.

As for Pasquale, his patience finally snaps after enduring relentless misfortunes since returning to his homeland. Breaking his silence, he delivers an impassioned, unintelligible rant recounting his trials, condemning the pointlessness of his vote, and railing against the state of the country. His tirade concludes with a clear, cutting message: he tells the election officials—and symbolically, all of Italy—to "screw themselves." With that, he bids farewell and heads back to Germany.

== Comment ==
Verdone’s second film follows the success of Fun Is Beautiful (Un sacco bello), employing a similar formula where he serves as both director and multi-role actor. Set against the backdrop of election day, the film satirizes the struggles and miseries of Italian society, particularly highlighting the hardships faced by emigrants.

Producer Sergio Leone initially feared that the character of Furio might be too unlikable for audiences. Ultimately, Leone came to agree with Verdone’s creative choices. The character of Furio—obsessive, pedantic, and neurotic—recurs frequently in Verdone’s work, as he has admitted it was inspired by one of his own relatives.

Russian actress Irina Sanpiter was cast for the role of Magda due to her striking blue eyes and angelic, pale appearance. Meanwhile, Pasquale represents a dated stereotype of the helpless Italian emigrant. His character is emphasized through his disheveled, old-fashioned clothing, his car adorned with garish decorations, and his penchant for listening to Italian music from the 1950s.
