= Spettacolo =

- Theatrical release poster
- Directed by: Jeff Malmberg; Chris Shellen
- Produced by: Jeff Malmberg; Chris Shellen; Matt Radecki
- Starring: Andrea Cresti
- Cinematography: Jeff Malmberg
- Edited by: Jeff Malmberg
- Music by: Lele Marchitelli
- Production company: Open Face
- Distributed by: Grasshopper Film
- Release date: September 6, 2017
- Running time: 91 minutes
- Country: United States
- Language: Italian with English subtitles
- Box office: $32,494

Spettacolo is a 2017 documentary film about a small hilltown in Italy that practices a unique form of theatre called "autodrama". It is the second feature of Marwencol filmmakers Jeff Malmberg and Chris Shellen, made through their production company, Open Face. The title is an Italian word meaning "performance, spectacle, or play" and in Italian is pronounced [spetˈtaːkolo] ("spet-TAH-kō-lō").

== Synopsis ==
Monticchiello, a tiny hill town in Tuscany, has found a unique way to confront its problems – the people turn their lives into a play. Every summer for 50 years, their piazza becomes their stage and villagers play themselves. Every problem the town has faced since World War II – their near annihilation by Nazis, the disappearance of their farming heritage, the commercialization of their land – every major event has been dramatized and debated by the villagers in the center of town. The film tells the story of Teatro Povero ("Poor Theatre"), interweaving episodes from its past with footage from the present as the villagers turn a series of devastating blows – financial ruin, rising neo-fascism, a dwindling future generation – into a play about the end of their world.

== Production ==
The film was shot in Tuscany in Italy between 2012 and 2016, using a Sony EX-1 camera and a portable Zoom audio recorder. The crew of Malmberg and Shellen lived in Monticchiello for six months in 2012 to make the film. They involved the town in their editorial process, showing several rough cuts of the film to the townspeople for feedback.

== Reception ==
The film was released on September 6, 2017, at the Quad Cinema in New York City before moving on to 25 other cities. The three-week run at the Quad included a short film before the feature by Jeff Malmberg and Chris Shellen, Amleto, focusing on the daily life of one of Monticchiello's cats. The film has a 93% approval rating on review aggregator Rotten Tomatoes, based on 27 reviews. In December 2022, the film was selected for the Criterion Channel.
