= Elisabetta Pozzi =

Italian actress

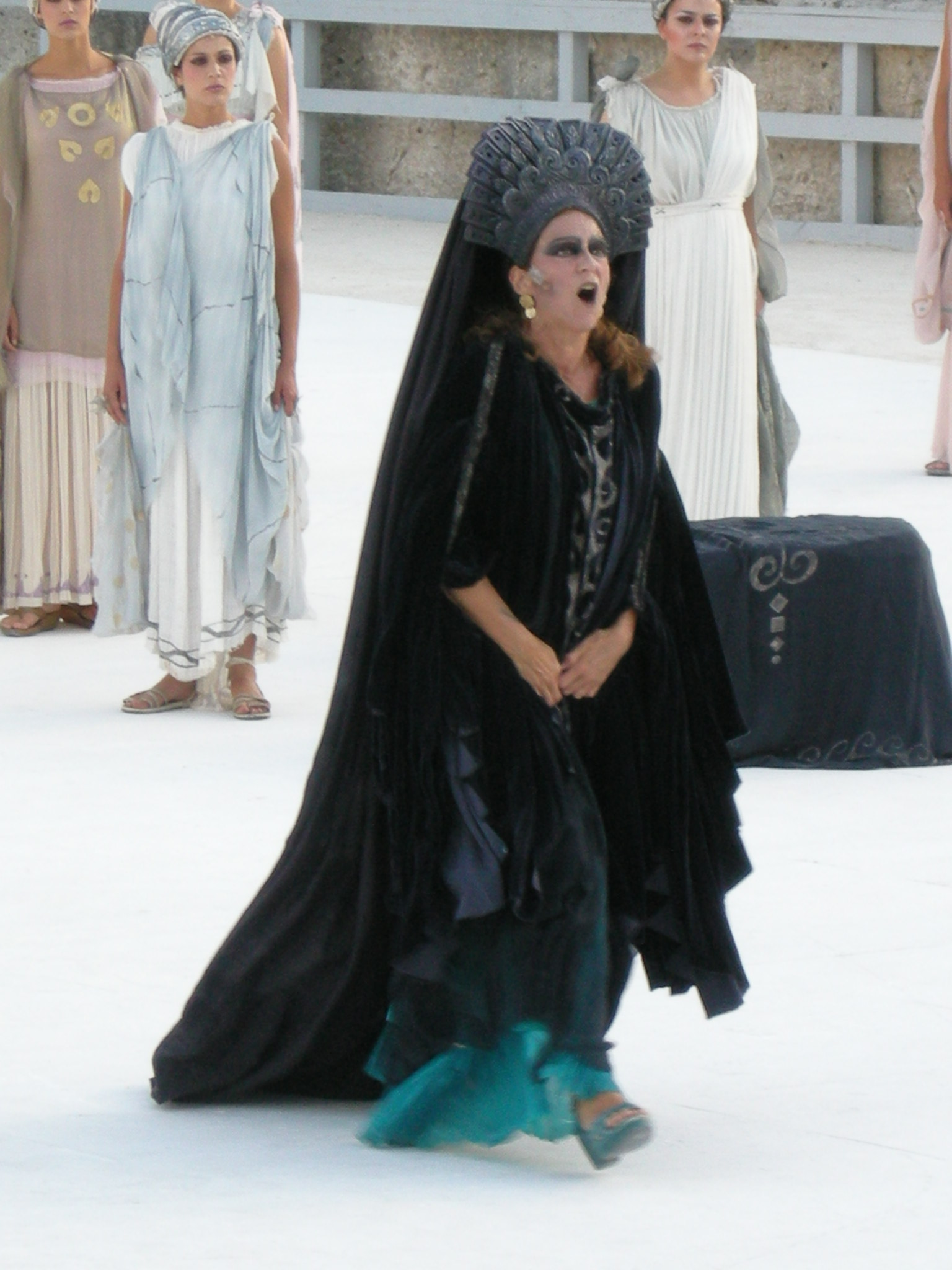
- Pozzi as Medea
- Born: 23 February 1955 (age 71); Genoa, Italy
- Occupation: Actress

Elisabetta Pozzi (born 23 February 1955) is an Italian stage, film and television actress.

== Life and career ==
Born in Genoa, Italy, Pozzi started to study acting during her high school years at the Teatro Stabile di Genova. She gave her debut on stage at the age of seventeen, playing the role of Romilda in an adaptation of Luigi Pirandello's The Late Mattia Pascal directed by Giorgio Albertazzi. Pozzi soon asserted herself as one of the most requested actresses of Italian theatre, notably working with Luca Ronconi, Peter Stein, Luigi Squarzina, Nanni Loy, Giancarlo Cobelli and at the Piccolo Teatro in Milan. She is also active on television and in cinema. In 1992, her role of Adriana in Carlo Verdone's Damned the Day I Met You earned her the David di Donatello Award for Best Supporting Actress.

In 2002, she played the title role of Hamlet in a production in the Teatro Farnese in Parma, directed by Walter Le Moli.

== Filmography (selected) ==
- 1978: Where Are You Going on Holiday?, dir. Mauro Bolognini, Luciano Salce and Alberto Sordi
- 1980: The Mystery of Oberwald, dir. Michelangelo Antonioni
- 1984: Nothing Left to Do But Cry, dir. Roberto Benigni and Massimo Troisi
- 1992: Damned the Day I Met You, dir. Carlo Verdone
