= Wonderboys: The Secret Treasure of Naples =

- Original Poster
- Uonderbois
- Genre: Drama; Adventure
- Created by: Barbara Petronio; Gabriele Galli
- Screenplay by: Gabriele Galli; Barbara Petronio; Francesco Balletta; Rosella Di Campli; Veronica Galli
- Story by: Barbara Petronio; Gabriele Galli
- Directed by: Andrea De Sica; Giorgio Romano
- Music by: Andrea Farri
- Country of origin: Italy
- Original language: Italian
- No. of seasons: 1
- No. of episodes: 6

Production
- Executive producer: Barbara Petronio
- Producers: Roberta Jarratt; Andrea Leone; Raffaella Leone; Alberto Sammarco
- Cinematography: Gian Enrico Bianchi; Sebastiano Bazzini
- Editor: Francesco Garrone
- Running time: 45 minutes
- Production company: Lotus Production

Original release
- Network: Disney+
- Release: 6 December 2024

Wonderboys: The Secret Treasure of Naples (Italian: Uonderbois) is a 2024 Italian television series produced for Disney+. It was directed by Giorgio Romano and Andrea de Sica.

== Overview ==
Wonderboys: The Secret Treasure of Naples follows the adventures of five inseparable 12-year-old friends, known as the Wonderboys, who embark on a quest to find a legendary treasure hidden in the underground of Naples. Their journey begins when their homes are threatened with eviction by the Old Hag, who plans to sell their apartments in exchange for a Maradona figurine. The figurine is stolen by their idol, Tonino Wonderboy, who becomes the new Munaciello of Naples. The Wonderboys must navigate the city's underground, facing various challenges and dangers, as they search for the mysterious treasure.

The series blends elements of drama, adventure, and family themes, capturing the essence of friendship and bravery as the Wonderboys work together to save their homes and uncover the secrets of Naples.

== Production ==
The filming of Wonderboys: The Secret Treasure of Naples took place in Naples between December 2022 and March 2023.

== Release ==
=== Streaming ===
All episodes of the series were released on Disney+ on 6 December 2024.

=== Soundtrack ===
The soundtrack of the series was released on 18 December 2024 by Walt Disney Records, Andrea Farri composed the original music.
