= Si vive una volta sola =

2021 Italian comedy film

- Film poster
- Directed by: Carlo Verdone
- Written by: Carlo Verdone; Giovanni Veronesi; Pasquale Plastino
- Produced by: Luigi De Laurentiis; Aurelio De Laurentiis
- Starring: Carlo Verdone; Rocco Papaleo; Anna Foglietta; Max Tortora
- Cinematography: Giovanni Canevari
- Edited by: Pietro Morana
- Music by: Michele Braga
- Production company: Filmauro
- Distributed by: Amazon Prime Video
- Release dates: 28 April 2021 (Rome); 13 May 2021
- Running time: 105 minutes
- Country: Italy
- Language: Italian

Si vive una volta sola (lit. 'We only live once') is a 2021 Italian comedy film directed by Carlo Verdone.

The film is written by Verdone himself, together with Giovanni Veronesi and Pasquale Plastino, and its release has been delayed three times from the original February 2020 date due to the COVID-19 pandemic. The film was released on Prime Video in Italy on May 13, 2021.

== Cast ==
- Carlo Verdone as Umberto Gastaldi
- Rocco Papaleo as Amedeo Lasalandra
- Anna Foglietta as Lucia Santilli
- Max Tortora as Corrado Pezzella
- Mariana Falace as Tina Gastaldi
- Sergio Múñiz as Xabier

== Release ==
Originally set to be released on 27 February 2020, the date was delayed to 27 November due to the outbreak of the COVID-19 pandemic in Italy. In October 2020, after the Italian government imposed the closure of theaters in the whole country, in order to decrease the impact of a new outbreak, Filmauro pushed back the release to 20 January 2021. The film was delayed again and finally released in a selection of theatres in Rome on 28 April 2021, and via streaming on Amazon Prime Video on 13 May.
