= Blessed Madness =

2018 Italian comedy film

- Film poster
- Italian: Benedetta follia
- Directed by: Carlo Verdone
- Written by: Carlo Verdone; Nicola Guaglianone; Menotti
- Produced by: Aurelio De Laurentiis; Luigi De Laurentiis
- Starring: Carlo Verdone; Ilenia Pastorelli; Maria Pia Calzone; Lucrezia Lante della Rovere
- Cinematography: Arnaldo Catinari
- Edited by: Pietro Morana
- Music by: Michele Braga
- Distributed by: Filmauro
- Release date: 11 January 2018 (Italy)
- Running time: 109 minutes
- Country: Italy
- Language: Italian

Blessed Madness (Italian: Benedetta follia) is a 2018 Italian comedy film directed by Carlo Verdone.

== Plot ==
Guglielmo and Lidia have been married for twenty-five years; on the day of their anniversary, Lidia confesses to her husband that she has been cheating on him for a year with Guglielmo's order. Having lost his wife and sales assistant, the man offers the job to Luna, a Roman girl with money problems. After a troubled start, Guglielmo and Luna manage to enter into symbiosis, both at work and in private life, to the point that she helps him find a new partner.

== Cast ==
- Carlo Verdone as Guglielmo Pantalei
- Ilenia Pastorelli as Luna
- Maria Pia Calzone as Ornella
- Lucrezia Lante della Rovere as Lidia
- Paola Minaccioni as Raffaella
- Federica Fracassi as Rita
- Francesca Manzini as Adriana
- Elisa Di Eusanio as Letizia
- Gina Rovere as Letizia's aunt
- Margherita Di Rauso as Antonietta
- Aldo De Martino as Cardinal Maresca
- Paolo Paoloni as father Martinez
- Antonio Zavatteri as Luna's father
