= Dario Bandiera =

Italian actor and comedian (born 1970)

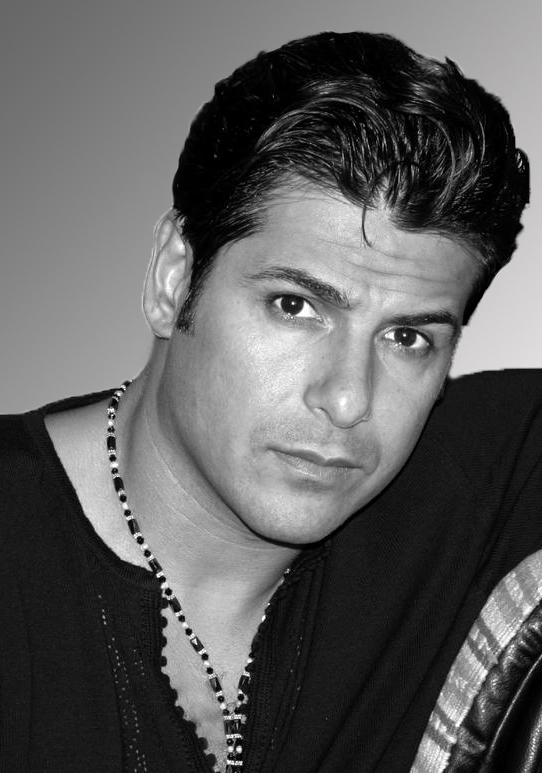
- Born: 9 February 1970 (age 55); Syracuse, Sicily
- Occupation: actor

Dario Bandiera (born 9 February 1970) is an Italian actor and comedian.

== Life and career ==
Born in Syracuse, Sicily, Bandiera began his career working in tourist villages as an entertainer. In 1992 he moved to Rome to study acting and in early 1990s he started appearing in television programs such as Domenica In and Stasera mi butto and then, between 1994 and 1996, he was a regular in the variety show Beato tra le donne. Bandiera made his film debut in 1994, in the comedy film Miracolo italiano.

After several other roles on stage, television and in films, his breakout came in 2003 as a semi-regular entertainer in the talk show Maurizio Costanzo Show. In 2007 he was nominated to Nastro d'Argento for Best Supporting Actor thanks to his performance in Giovanni Veronesi's Manual of Love 2.
