= Damned the Day I Met You =

- Directed by: Carlo Verdone
- Written by: Francesca Marciano; Carlo Verdone
- Produced by: Mario Cecchi Gori; Vittorio Cecchi Gori
- Starring: Carlo Verdone; Margherita Buy
- Cinematography: Danilo Desideri
- Edited by: Antonio Siciliano
- Music by: Fabio Liberatori
- Distributed by: Variety Distribution
- Release date: 1992
- Running time: 112 minutes
- Country: Italy
- Language: Italian
- Box office: $6.4 million (Italy)

Damned the Day I Met You ( Italian: Maledetto il giorno che t'ho incontrato) is a 1992 Italian romantic comedy film directed by Carlo Verdone. The film won five David di Donatello Awards, for Best Screenplay, Best Actor, Best Cinematography, Best Editing and Best Supporting Actress (Elisabetta Pozzi). For her performance, Margherita Buy won the Ciak d'oro for Best Actress.

== Plot ==
Bernardo, a Roman music journalist living in Milan, is dumped by his girlfriend (almost fiancé), and, extremely depressed, begins working with a therapist, Prof. Altieri. His career as a rock music critic begins to decline, and he cannot find a way to publish a book on the life secrets of Jimi Hendrix. In the meantime, he meets the neurotic Camilla, who is both a patient and a wannabe lover of Altieri's, with whom she's obsessed. From that point on, Camilla disrupts Bernardo's life, but becomes his best friend. After a huge fight, the two lose contact. They separately travel to London, where Camilla is a theatre actress and Bernardo is working on Hendrix's biography, interviewing people who might have known the rock star. They meet again, apologizing to one another, only to have their personal and professional lives disrupted again. One night, at Land's End in Cornwall, Bernardo and Camilla get intimately close, enraging Camilla's latest boyfriend (her theatre production's director), with whom she was not happy anyway. Camilla secretly sells a precious ring to fund Bernardo's interview with an important source for his book. Later on though, she messes up the recording of the interview... The ending is very romantic, unlike the ending of most of Verdone's movies.

== Cast ==
- Carlo Verdone as Bernardo Arbusti
- Margherita Buy as Camilla Landolfi
- Elisabetta Pozzi as Adriana
- Giancarlo Dettori as Attilio De Sorges
- Stefania Casini as Clari
- Renato Pareti as Loris
- Dario Casalini as Flavio
- Alexis Meneloff as Professor Ludwig Altieri
- Count Prince Miller as Catfish
- Didi Perego as Camilla's mother
- Valeria Sabel as Bernardo's mother
- Ernesto Martini as Bernardo's father
- Richard Benson as himself

== Reception ==
In its second week of release, the film reached number one at the Italian box office and remained there for two weeks. It was the fourth highest-grossing Italian film in Italy for the year with a gross of $6.4 million and the eleventh overall.

== Awards ==
Awards
Award	Category	Recipients and nominees	Result
59th David di Donatello Awards	Best Film	Carlo Verdone, Mario Cecchi Gori and Vittorio Cecchi Gori	Nominated
59th David di Donatello Awards	Best Director	Carlo Verdone	Nominated
59th David di Donatello Awards	Best Script	Carlo Verdone and Francesca Marciano	Won
59th David di Donatello Awards	Best Actor	Carlo Verdone	Won
59th David di Donatello Awards	Best Actress	Margherita Buy	Nominated
59th David di Donatello Awards	Best Supporting Actor	Giancarlo Dettori	Nominated
59th David di Donatello Awards	Best Supporting Actress	Elisabetta Pozzi	Won
59th David di Donatello Awards	Best Cinematography	Danilo Desideri	Won
59th David di Donatello Awards	Best Editing	Antonio Siciliano	Won
32nd Globi d'oro	Best Film	Carlo Verdone	Nominated
32nd Globi d'oro	Best Script	Carlo Verdone and Francesca Marciano	Nominated
32nd Globi d'oro	Best Actor	Carlo Verdone	Won
32nd Globi d'oro	Best Actress	Margherita Buy	Won
32nd Globi d'oro	Best Cinematography	Danilo Desideri	Nominated
7th Ciak d'oro	Best Actress	Margherita Buy	Won
