= Fun Is Beautiful =

Fun Is Beautiful (Un sacco bello)
- Directed by: Carlo Verdone
- Written by: Leonardo Benvenuti; Piero De Bernardi; Carlo Verdone
- Produced by: Romano Caldarelli; Sergio Leone
- Starring: Carlo Verdone; Veronica Miriel; Mario Brega; Renato Scarpa
- Cinematography: Ennio Guarnieri
- Edited by: Eugenio Alabiso
- Music by: Ennio Morricone
- Release date: 1980
- Running time: 97 minutes
- Country: Italy
- Language: Italian

Un sacco bello, internationally released as Fun Is Beautiful, is a 1980 Italian comedy film. The film, produced by Sergio Leone, marked the directorial debut of Carlo Verdone, as well his debut as main actor and as screenwriter. For this film Verdone won a special David di Donatello Awards and the Nastro d'Argento for best new actor.

== Plot ==
Carlo Verdone plays three roles in three episodes joined together. In the first, the Roman hick Enzo organizes a trip to Poland for Ferragosto, hoping to ingratiate himself with the sexual favors of some beautiful Polish girl with the help of a generous supply of nylon stockings (in those years considered a luxury commodity in countries behind the Iron Curtain). In the second episode, the post-hippie Ruggero by some days in his native Rome, while at the traffic light distributing leaflets and asking for an offer of money for a new commune that his group is forming in Citta della Pieve, meets his father (Mario Brega) by chance, in the middle of traffic. His father believes that the guy has psychological problems, and so he asks the help of a priest, a teacher and a very problematic nephew. Mr. Mario then is going to change the mentality of the guy with the help of these wise people, in the hope that Ruggero and his girlfriend (who is also a flower child) find themselves the right way to live in a modern society. Finally, the shy and awkward Leo find the love in a Spanish girl, but she gives him a lot of problems. In fact, she is not alone and intends to recover an affair with her ex.

== Cast ==
- Carlo Verdone: Enzo/Ruggero/Leo/Don Alfio/Anselmo/professor
- Mario Brega: Mario
- Renato Scarpa: Sergio
- Veronica Miriel: Marisol
- Isabella De Bernardi: Fiorenza
- Sandro Ghiani: Cristiano
