= Sergio Leone =

Italian filmmaker (1929–1989)

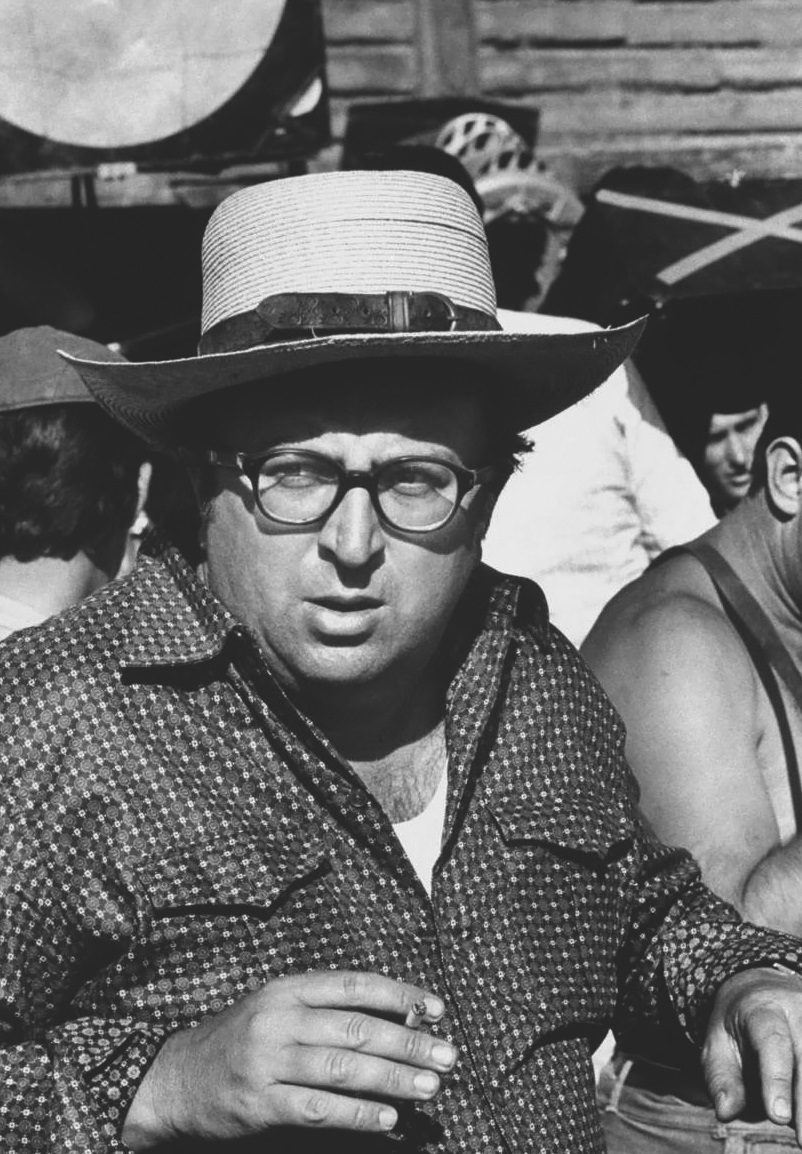
- Leone in 1975
- Born: 3 January 1929; Rome, Kingdom of Italy
- Died: 30 April 1989 (aged 60); Rome, Italy
- Resting place: Napoleonic Cemetery, Pratica di Mare, Pomezia, Italy
- Occupations: Film director; producer; screenwriter
- Years active: 1948–1989
- Style: Spaghetti Western; Revisionist Western; drama
- Children: 3, including Raffaella
- Parents: Roberto Roberti (father); Bice Waleran (mother)

Sergio Leone (/liˈoʊni/ lee-OH-nee; Italian: [ˈsɛrdʒo leˈoːne]; 3 January 1929 – 30 April 1989) was an Italian filmmaker, credited as the pioneer of the spaghetti Western genre. He is widely regarded as one of the greatest directors in the history of cinema.

Leone's film-making style includes juxtaposing extreme close-up shots with lengthy long shots. His films include the Dollars Trilogy of Westerns featuring Clint Eastwood: A Fistful of Dollars (1964), For a Few Dollars More (1965), and The Good, the Bad and the Ugly (1966); and the Once Upon a Time films: Once Upon a Time in the West (1968), Duck, You Sucker! (1971), and Once Upon a Time in America (1984).

== Early life ==
Born on 3 January 1929 in Rome, Leone was the son of the cinema pioneer Vincenzo Leone (known as Roberto Roberti or Leone Roberto Roberti) and silent film actress Edvige Valcarenghi (known as Bice Waleran). His mother was of Milanese and remote Austrian descent. During his schooldays, Leone was a classmate of his later musical collaborator Ennio Morricone in third grade. After watching his father work on film sets, Leone began his own career in the film industry at the age of 18 after dropping out of law studies at the university.

Working in Italian cinema, he began as an assistant to Vittorio De Sica during the production for the movie Bicycle Thieves in 1948. Leone began writing screenplays during the 1950s, primarily for the "sword and sandal" (or peplum) historical epics, popular at the time. He also worked as an assistant director on several large-scale international productions shot at the Cinecittà Studios in Rome, notably Quo Vadis (1951) and Ben-Hur (1959), financially backed by the American studios.

When director Mario Bonnard fell ill during the production of the 1959 Italian epic The Last Days of Pompeii (Gli Ultimi Giorni di Pompei), starring Steve Reeves, Leone was asked to step in and complete the film. As a result, when the time came to make his solo directorial debut with The Colossus of Rhodes (Il Colosso di Rodi, 1961), Leone was well-equipped to produce low-budget films that looked like larger-budget Hollywood movies.

== Career ==
Italian: Il cinema deve essere spettacolo, è questo che il pubblico vuole. E per me lo spettacolo più bello è quello del mito. Cinema must be spectacle, that's what the public wants. And for me the most beautiful spectacle is that of the myth.

=== 1960s ===
In the mid-1960s, historical epics fell out of favor with audiences, but Leone had shifted his attention to a subgenre which came to be known as the "spaghetti Western", owing its origin to the American Western. His film A Fistful of Dollars (Per un pugno di dollari, 1964) was based upon Akira Kurosawa's Edo-era samurai adventure Yojimbo (1961). Leone's film elicited a legal challenge from the Japanese director, though Kurosawa's film was, in turn, probably based on the 1929 Dashiell Hammett novel, Red Harvest. A Fistful of Dollars is also notable for establishing Clint Eastwood as a star. Until that time, Eastwood had been an American television actor with few credited film roles.

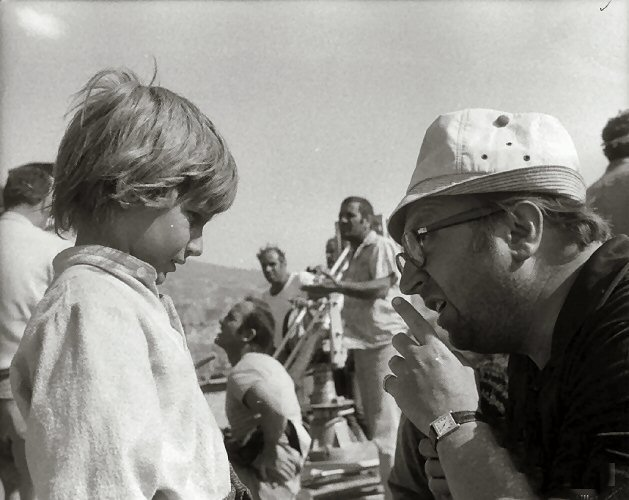
Leone and Enzo Santaniello on the set of Once Upon a Time in the West

The look of A Fistful of Dollars was established by its Spanish locations, which presented a violent and morally complex vision of the American Old West. The film paid tribute to traditional American Western films, but significantly departed from them in storyline, plot, characterization, and mood. Leone gains credit for one great breakthrough in the Western genre still followed today; in traditional Western films, many heroes and villains looked alike as if they had just stepped out of a fashion magazine, with clearly drawn moral opposites, even down to the hero wearing a white hat and the villain wearing a black hat (except for the most successful of the "traditional western cowboys" – Hopalong Cassidy, who wore a black outfit upon a pale horse). Leone's characters were, in contrast, more "realistic" and complex: usually lone wolves in their behavior; they rarely shaved, looked dirty, and sweated profusely, with a strong suggestion of criminal behavior. The characters were also morally ambiguous by appearing generously compassionate, or nakedly and brutally self-serving, as the situation demanded. Relationships revolved around power and retributions were emotion-driven rather than conscience-driven. Some critics have noted the irony of an Italian director who could not speak English, and had never even visited the United States, let alone the American Old West, almost single-handedly redefining the typical vision of the American cowboy. According to Christopher Frayling's book Something to do with Death, Leone knew a great deal about the American Old West. It fascinated him as a child, which carried into his adulthood and his films.

Leone's next two films, For a Few Dollars More (Per qualche dollaro in più, 1965) and The Good, the Bad and the Ugly (Il buono, il brutto, il cattivo, 1966), completed what has come to be known as the Man with No Name trilogy (or the Dollars Trilogy), with each film being more financially successful and more technically accomplished than its predecessor. The films featured innovative music scores by Ennio Morricone, who worked closely with Leone in devising the themes. Leone had a personal way of shooting scenes with Morricone's music ongoing. In addition, Clint Eastwood stayed with the film series, joined later by Eli Wallach, Lee van Cleef, and Klaus Kinski.

Based on the success of the Man with No Name trilogy, Leone was invited to the United States in 1967 to direct Once Upon a Time in the West (C'era una volta il West) for Paramount Pictures. The film was shot mostly in Almería, Spain, and Cinecittà in Rome. It was also briefly shot in Monument Valley, Utah. The film starred Charles Bronson, Henry Fonda, Jason Robards, and Claudia Cardinale. Once Upon a Time in the West emerged as a long and violent dreamlike meditation upon the mythology of the American Old West, with many stylistic references to iconic Western films. Audience tension is maintained throughout this nearly three-hour film by concealing both the hero's identity and his unpredictable motivation until the final predictable shootout scene. The film's script was written by Leone and his longtime friend and collaborator Sergio Donati, from a story by Bernardo Bertolucci and Dario Argento, both of whom went on to have significant careers as directors. Before its release, it was ruthlessly edited by Paramount, and achieved low box-office results in the United States. Nevertheless, it was a huge hit in Europe, grossing nearly three times its $5 million budget among French audiences, and highly praised among North American film students. It has come to be regarded by many as Leone's best film.

=== 1970s ===
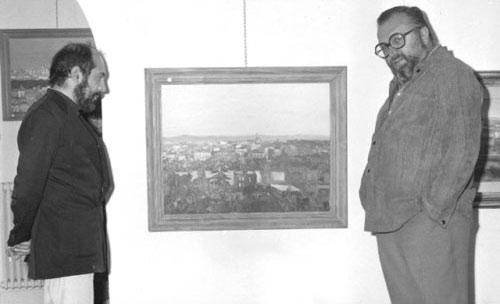
Leone and artist Vincenzo Romano Salvia in Rome, 1971

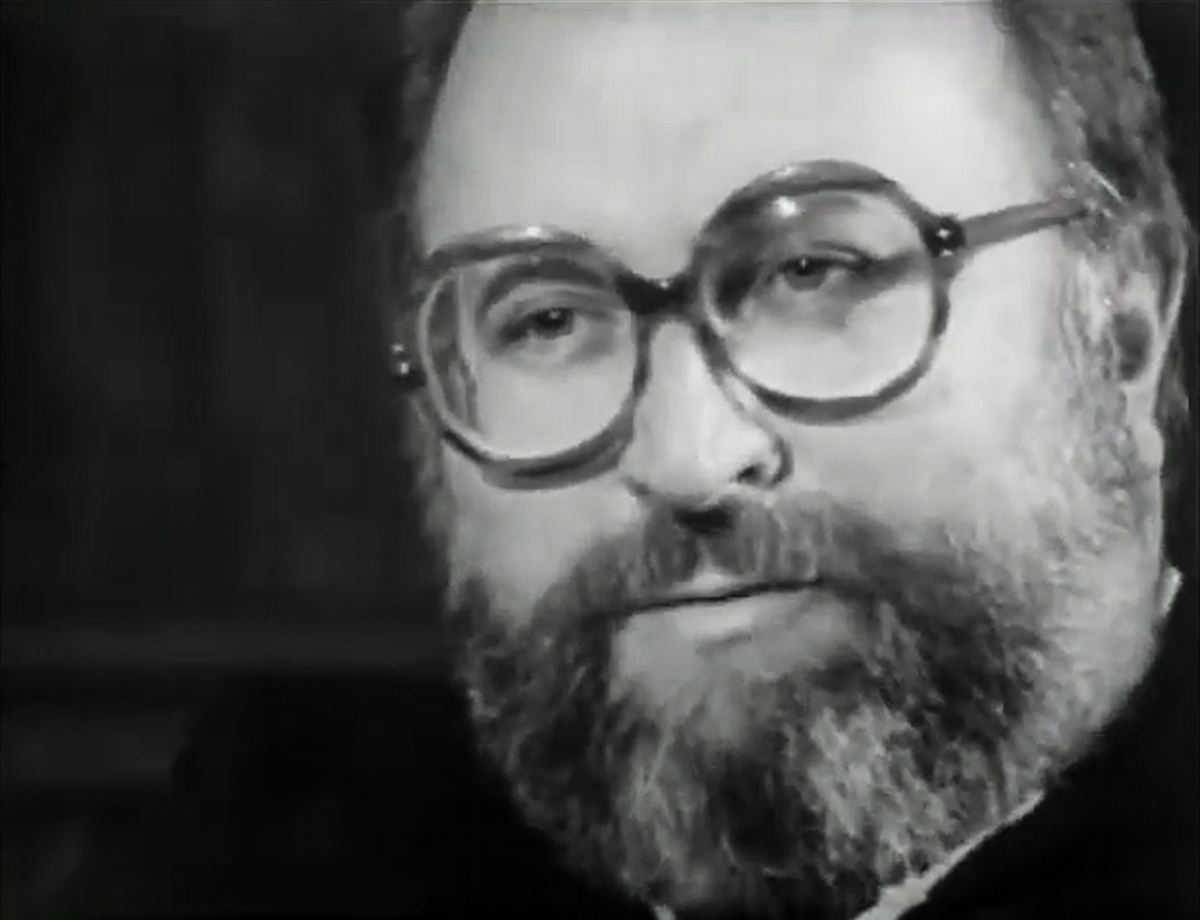
Leone during a 1975 interview

After Once Upon a Time in the West, Leone directed Duck, You Sucker! (Giù la testa, 1971). Leone was intending merely to produce the film, but due to artistic differences with then-director Peter Bogdanovich, Leone was asked to direct the film, instead. Duck, You Sucker! is a Mexican Revolution action drama, starring James Coburn as an Irish revolutionary and Rod Steiger as a Mexican bandit who is conned into becoming a revolutionary.

Leone continued to produce, and on occasion, step in to reshoot scenes, in other films. One of these films was My Name Is Nobody (1973) by Tonino Valerii, a comedy Western film that poked fun at the spaghetti Western genre. It starred Henry Fonda as an old gunslinger facing a final confrontation after the death of his brother. Terence Hill also starred in the film as the young stranger who helps Fonda leave the dying West with style.

Leone's other productions included A Genius, Two Partners and a Dupe (1975, another Western comedy starring Terence Hill); The Cat (Il Gatto; 1977, starring Ugo Tognazzi), and A Dangerous Toy (Il Giocattolo; 1979, starring Nino Manfredi). Leone also produced three comedies by actor/director Carlo Verdone, which were Fun Is Beautiful (Un Sacco Bello, 1980), Bianco, rosso e Verdone (White, Red and Verdone – Verdone means "strong green" – a pun referring to the three colors of the Italian flag, the star and to director Verdone, 1981) and Troppo Forte (Great!, 1986). During this period, Leone also directed various award-winning TV commercials for European television.

In 1978, he was a member of the jury at the 28th Berlin International Film Festival.

=== 1980s ===
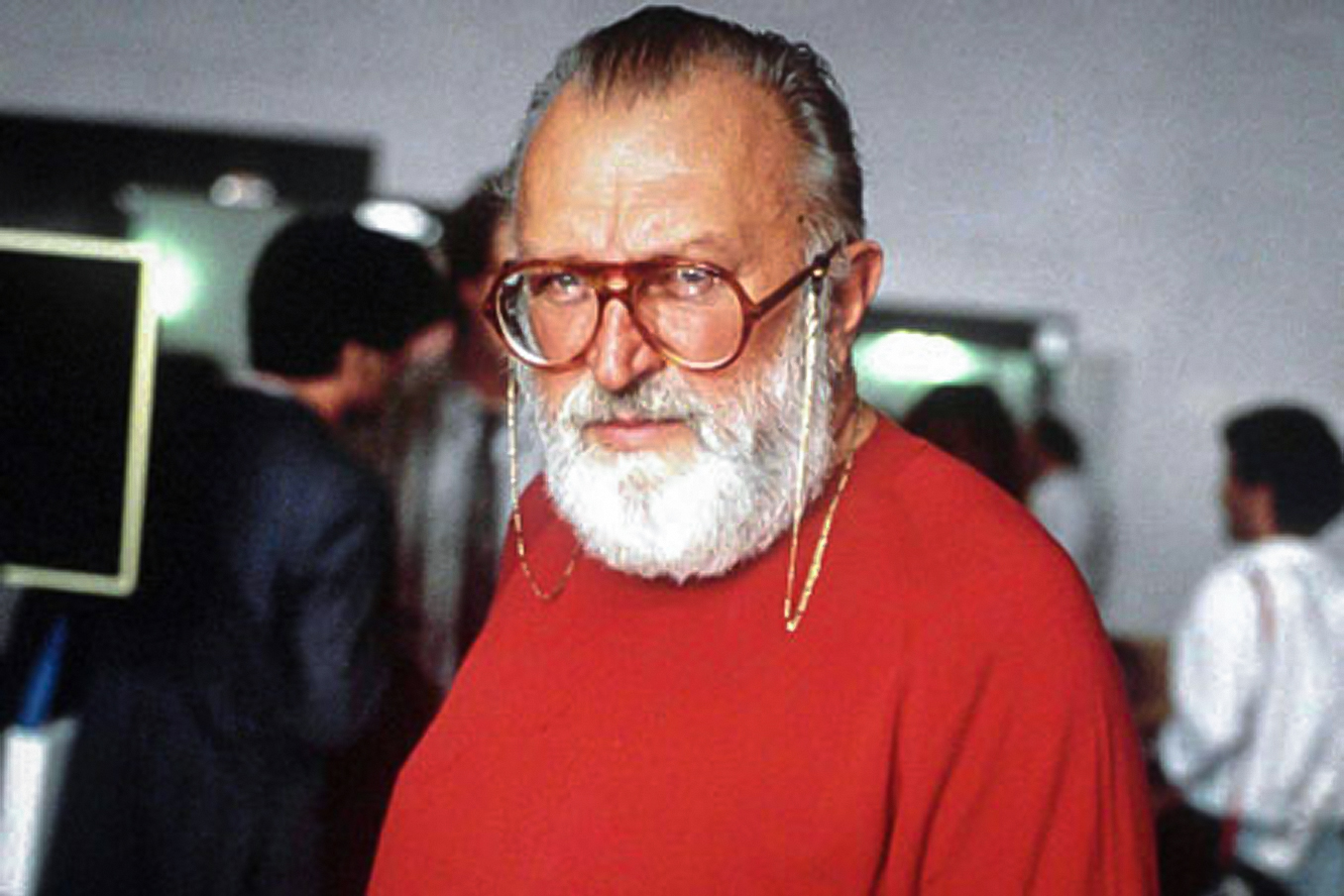
Sergio Leone

Leone turned down the offer to direct The Godfather, in favor of working on another gangster story he had conceived earlier. He devoted 10 years to this project, based on the novel The Hoods by former mobster Harry Grey, which focused on a quartet of New York City Jewish gangsters of the 1920s and 1930s who had been friends since childhood. The finished four-hour film, Once Upon a Time in America (1984), featured Robert De Niro and James Woods. It was a meditation on another aspect of popular American mythology, the role of greed and violence and their uneasy coexistence with the meaning of ethnicity and friendship. It received a raucous, record-breaking ovation of nearly 20 minutes at the 1984 Cannes Film Festival (reportedly heard by diners at restaurants across the street from the Palais), at a time in Cannes's history before marathon applause became a regular occurrence. Despite such a fawning reception, Warner Brothers felt it was too long. The studio drastically recut it down to two hours for the American market, abandoning its flashback structure for a linear narrative. This version suffered heavy criticism and flopped. The original version, released in the rest of the world, achieved somewhat better box office returns and a mixed critical response. When the original version of the film was released on home video in the US, it gained major critical acclaim, with some critics hailing the film as a magnum opus.

According to biographer Sir Christopher Frayling, Leone was deeply hurt by the studio-imposed editing and poor commercial reception of Once Upon a Time in America in North America. It was his last film.

In 1988, he was head of the jury at the 45th Venice International Film Festival.

== Death and unrealized projects ==
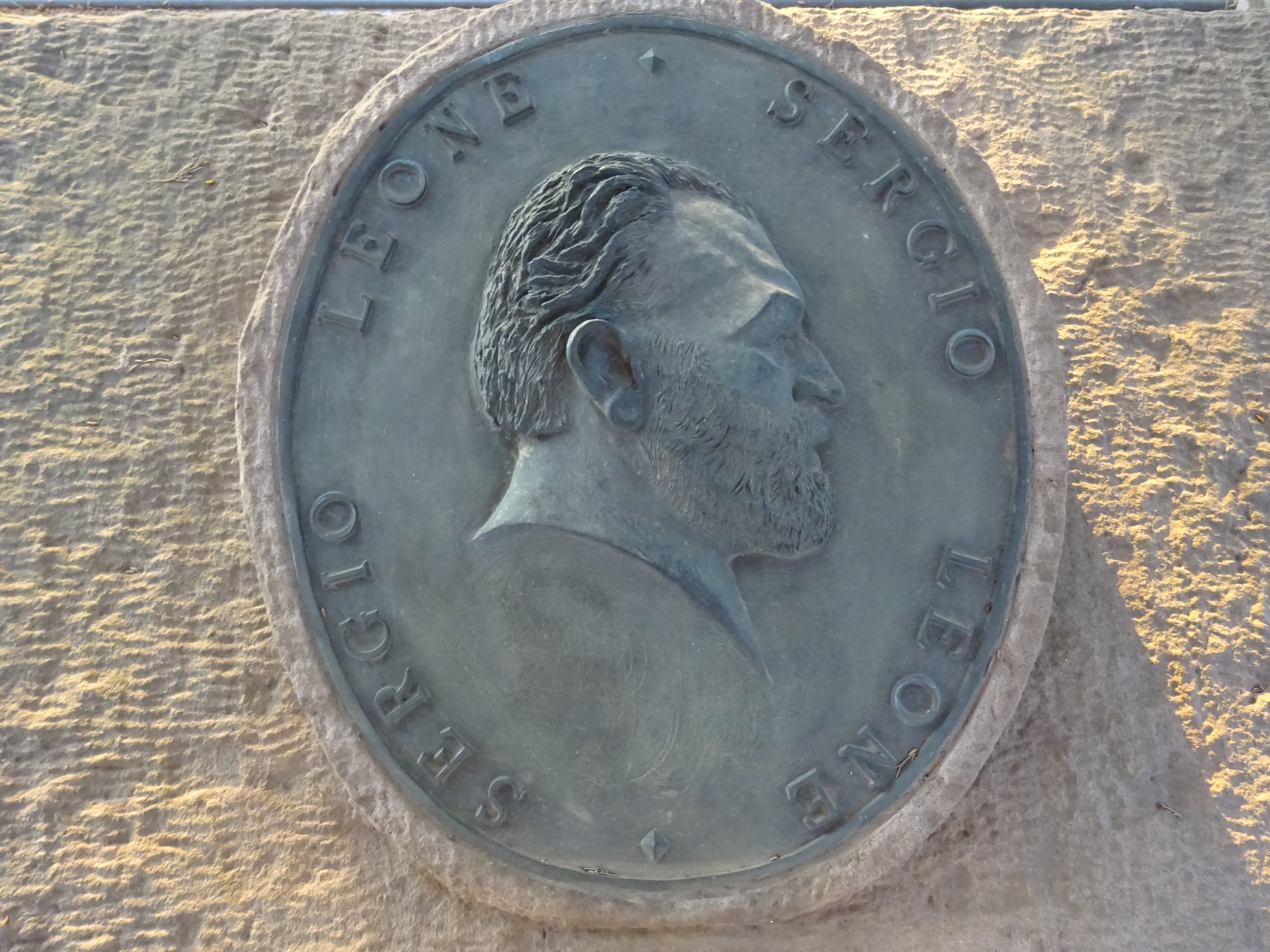
Medallion on the grave of Sergio Leone

Leone died on 30 April 1989 at his home in Rome of a heart attack at the age of 60. He is buried in the cemetery of Pratica di Mare.

=== A Place Only Mary Knows ===
A treatment for an "Americanized" Western was written by Leone, Luca Morsella, and Fabio Toncelli. It is speculated to have been Leone's last Western and was to have starred Mickey Rourke and Richard Gere as the two main leads. Set during the height of the American Civil War, the story focused on a Union drafter, Mike Kutcher from Georgia, whose job is to enroll men into the Union Army. The other is Richard Burns, a Southern shady businessman transplanted to the North after a successful heist with his ex-lover and partner, Mary. They try searching for the buried treasure left behind in an unmarked grave outside Atlanta in "A Place Only Mary Knows". Joined by a freed slave and an Italian immigrant, Francesco, who arrives via the Port of Boston, they try desperately to avoid the battles of the ongoing war between the states.

The film was to have been an homage to classic writers from literature such as Edgar Lee Masters (Spoon River Anthology), Ambrose Bierce (An Occurrence at Owl Creek Bridge), Mark Twain (The Private History of a Campaign that Failed), Stephen Crane (The Red Badge of Courage), and Margaret Mitchell (Gone with the Wind), whose novel he had wanted to film a remake of. Although the written treatment never got turned into a full screenplay, Leone's son Andrea had it published in a June 2004 issue of the Italian cinema magazine Ciak. It is not certain if the treatment's publication will ever lead to a full production in America or Italy.

=== Leningrad: The 900 Days ===
While finishing work on Once Upon a Time in America in 1982, Leone was impressed with Harrison Salisbury's non-fiction book The 900 Days: The Siege of Leningrad, and he planned on adapting the book as a war epic. Although no formal script had been completed or leaked, Leone came up with the opening scene and basic plot. According to the documentary Once Upon a Time, Sergio Leone, the film opened in medias res as the camera goes from focusing on a Soviet hiding from the Nazis' artillery fire to panning hundreds of feet away to show the German Army Panzer divisions approaching the walls of the city. The plot was to focus on an American photographer on assignment (whom Leone wanted to be played by Robert De Niro) becoming trapped in Leningrad as the German Luftwaffe begin to bombard the city. Throughout the course of the film, he becomes romantically involved with a Soviet woman, whom he later impregnates, as they attempt to survive the prolonged siege and the secret police, because relationships with foreigners are forbidden. According to Leone, "In the end, the cameraman dies on the day of the liberation of the city, when he is currently filming the surrender of the Germans. And the girl is aware of his death by chance seeing a movie news: the camera sees it explode under a shell".

By 1989, Leone set the film's budget at $100 million, and had secured half of that amount in financing from independent backers from the Soviet Union. He had convinced Ennio Morricone to compose the film score, and Tonino Delli Colli was tapped to be the cinematographer. Shooting was scheduled to begin sometime in 1990. The project was canceled when Leone died two days before he was to officially sign on for the film. Alex Cox offered to replace Leone as director, but was unable to secure the remaining $50 million required to produce the film.

=== Don Quixote ===
According to Frayling's biography of Leone, Something to Do with Death, he envisioned a contemporary adaptation of Cervantes' 17th-century novel Don Quixote with Clint Eastwood in the title role and Eli Wallach as Sancho Panza. He had discussed doing the project throughout the 1960s–1970s, and he started seriously considering it toward the end of his life.

=== Colt ===
In 1987, Sergio Leone contacted his old collaborators Sergio Donati and Fulvio Morsella, pitching an idea for a TV miniseries about a Colt revolver that passed from owner to owner throughout the Old West, similar to Anthony Mann's film Winchester '73 (1950). Donati indicated that Leone was interested in a more revisionist take on the genre than his earlier works, wanting to show the Old West "like it really was". Leone abandoned this project in favor of A Place Only Mary Knows, though Donati wrote a treatment and the project remained in gestation for years after Leone's death. An adaptation based on Leone's subject is currently in production. Appointed director is Italian film-maker Stefano Sollima.

=== Other ===
Leone was also an avid fan of Margaret Mitchell's novel Gone with the Wind and the 1939 film adaptation. His relatives and close friends stated that he talked about filming a remake that was closer to the original novel, but it never advanced beyond discussions to any serious form of production.

In 1969, Leone was contracted to direct 99 and 44/100% Dead with Marcello Mastroianni and Charles Bronson starring. He was replaced as director by John Frankenheimer, while Mastroianni was recast with Richard Harris.

Leone was a fan of Louis-Ferdinand Céline's novel Journey to the End of the Night and was considering a film adaptation in the late 1960s; he incorporated elements of the story into The Good, the Bad and the Ugly and Duck, You Sucker! but his idea of adapting the novel itself never got past the planning stages.

Leone was an early choice to direct Flash Gordon (1980). Leone was a fan of the original Alex Raymond comic strip, but turned down the film because the script did not resemble Raymond's work.

== Awards and honours ==
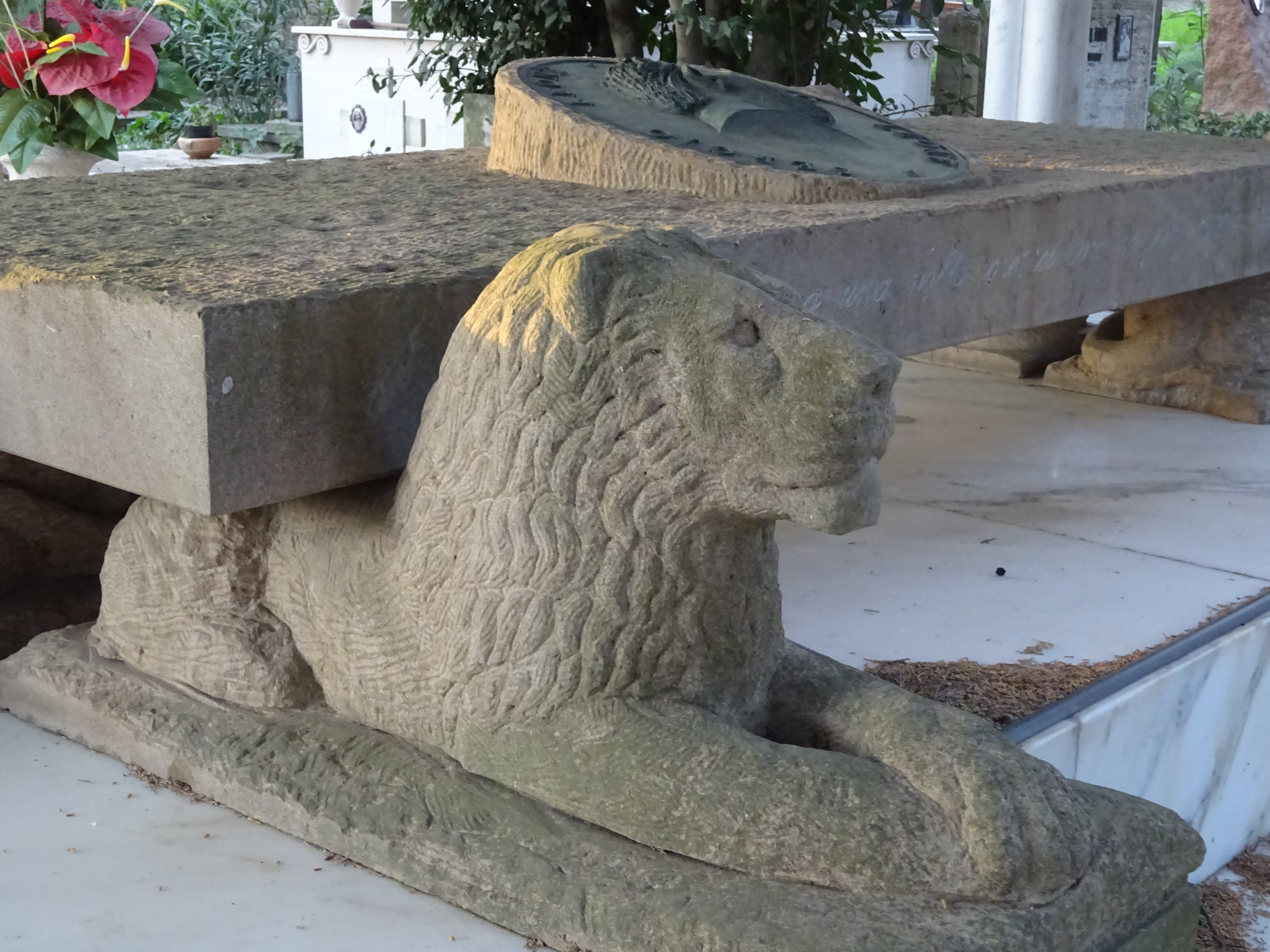
The Lion (Leone's Gravesite)

- David di Donatello
  - 1972: Duck, You Sucker! (Won)
- British Academy of Film and Television Arts – Award for Best Direction
  - 1984: Once Upon a Time in America (Nomination)
- Golden Globe Award for Best Director
  - 1984: Once Upon a Time in America (Nomination)

He received the America Award from the Italy–USA Foundation posthumously in 2014.

In 2019, Poste Italiane issued a commemorative postage stamp honoring Leone.

== Selected filmography ==
Year	English title	Italian title	Notes	Ref.
1961	The Colossus of Rhodes	Il Colosso di Rodi	—N/a	
1964	A Fistful of Dollars	Per un pugno di dollari	Dollars Trilogy	
1965	For a Few Dollars More	Per qualche dollaro in più	Dollars Trilogy	
1966	The Good, the Bad and the Ugly	Il buono, il brutto, il cattivo	Dollars Trilogy	
1968	Once Upon a Time in the West	C'era una volta il West	Once Upon a Time Trilogy	
1971	Duck, You Sucker!	Giù la testa	Once Upon a Time Trilogy	
1984	Once Upon a Time in America	C'era una volta in America	Once Upon a Time Trilogy	

== Bibliography ==
- Cumbow, Robert C. (15 February 2008). The Films of Sergio Leone. Scarecrow Press. ISBN 978-1-4617-3171-9.
- Curti, Robert (2016). Tonino Valerii: The Films. McFarland. ISBN 978-1476664682.
- Fawell, John Wesley (1 January 2005). The Art Of Sergio Leone's Once Upon A Time In The West: A Critical Appreciation. McFarland & Company Incorporated Pub. ISBN 978-0-7864-2092-6.
- Frayling, Christopher (2000). Sergio Leone: Something to Do With Death. Faber & Faber, Incorporated. ISBN 978-0-571-16438-7.
- Frayling, Christopher (1 July 2005). Once Upon a Time in Italy: The Westerns of Sergio Leone. Harry N. Abrams. ISBN 978-0-8109-5884-5.
- Frayling, Christopher (April 2008). Sergio Leone: Once Upon a Time in Italy. Thames & Hudson, Limited. ISBN 978-0-500-28743-9.
