= Francesca Marciano =

Italian writer and actress

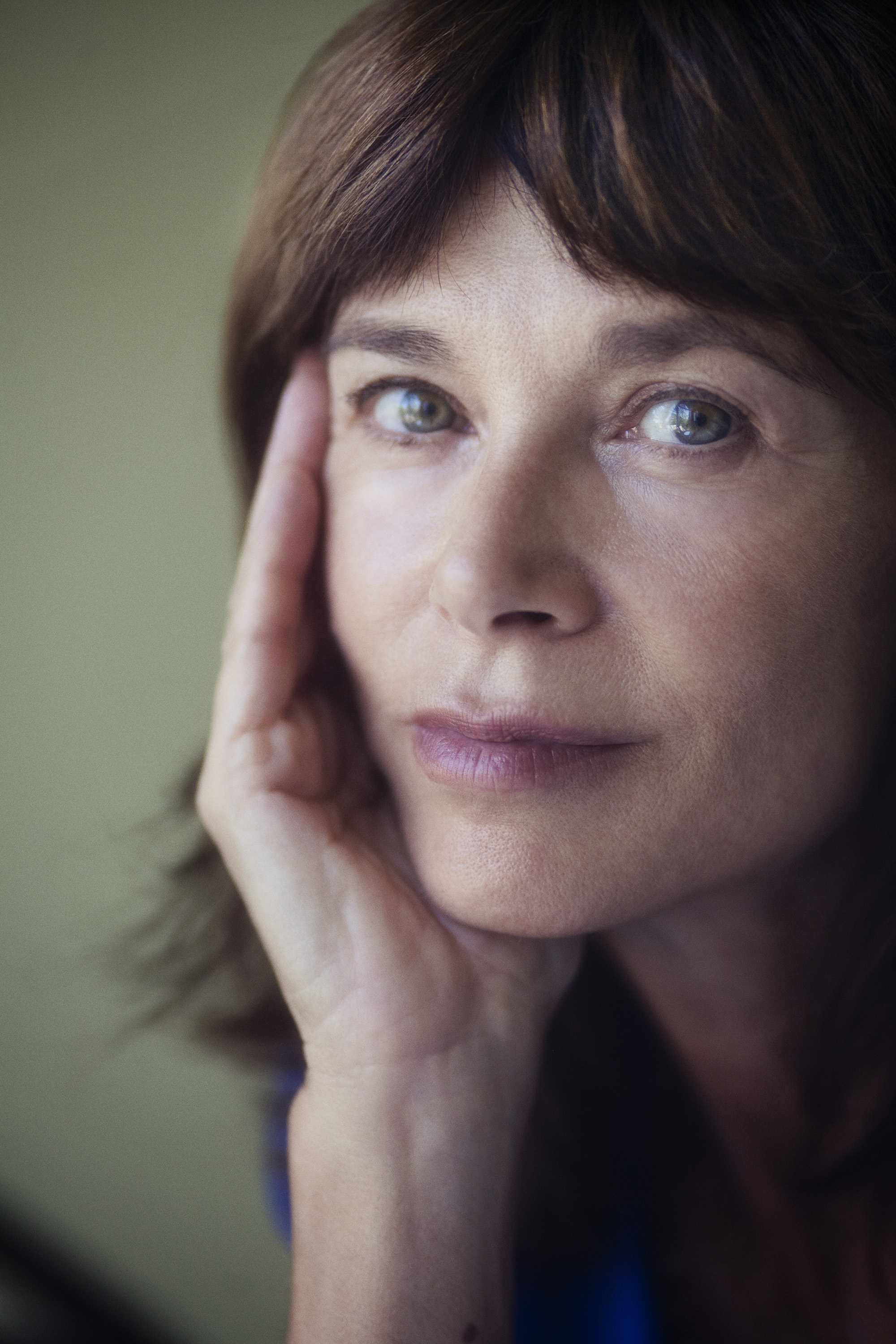
Portrait of Francesca Marciano

Francesca Marciano (born Rome, 17 July 1955) is an Italian novelist, screenwriter and actress.

== Life and career ==
After graduating in modern literature, Marciano moved to the United States, where she studied acting with Lee Strasberg and worked as assistant of Lionel Rogosin. Returned to Italy, she started collaborating as a journalist with RAI, and worked as an actress in films by Lina Wertmüller, Pupi Avati and Pasquale Festa Campanile. She was the recipient of the Rapallo Carige Prize for Casa Rossa in 2003. She won a David di Donatello award for best screenplay with Damned the Day I Met You, a film directed by Carlo Verdone in 1992.

== Works in English ==
- Rules of the wild, New York : Vintage Books, 1999. ISBN 9780375703430
- Casa Rossa, Pantheon, New York, 2005. ISBN 978-0-375-72637-8
- The end of manners, New York : Vintage Contemporaries, 2009. ISBN 9780307386748
- The other language : stories, New York : Vintage Books, 2015. ISBN 9780345804488
- Animal Spirit: stories, New York : Alfred A Knopf, 2020. ISBN 9781524748159

== Works ==
- Casa Rossa : romanzo, Milano : TEA, Tascabili degli Editori Associati, 2003.
- La fine delle buone maniere : romanzo, Milano : Teadue, 2009.
