= Antonio Siciliano =

Italian film editor (born c. 1936)

- Born: 4 February 1936 (age 90); Taurianova, Italy
- Occupation: Film editor

Antonio Siciliano (born 4 February 1936 in Taurianova) is an Italian film editor. From his debut in the early 1970s, Siciliano has worked as editor in more than 150 Italian productions, including films by Giuliano Montaldo, Damiano Damiani, Luigi Comencini, Luciano Salce, Steno, E.B. Clucher, Massimo Troisi and Franco Giraldi.

In 1992 he won the David di Donatello for Best Editing for the Carlo Verdone film Damned the Day I Met You.

== Selected filmography ==
- The President of Borgorosso Football Club (1970)
- Tell Me You Do Everything for Me (1976)
