= Carlo Verdone =

Italian actor, screenwriter and film director

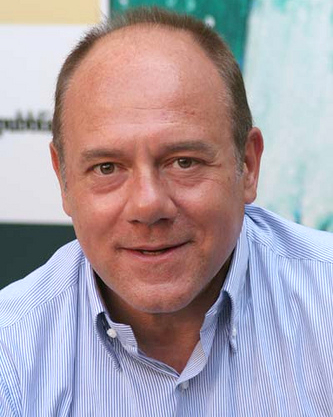
- Verdone in 2007
- Born: 17 November 1950 (age 75); Rome, Italy
- Occupations: Actor; screenwriter; film director
- Years active: 1975–present
- Spouse: Gianna Scarpelli (m. 1980; legal separation 1996)
- Children: 2
- Relatives: Christian De Sica (brother-in-law)

Carlo Gregorio Verdone (born 17 November 1950) is an Italian actor, screenwriter and film director. Best known for his comedic roles in Italian classics which he also wrote and directed such as Fun Is Beautiful and Bianco, rosso e Verdone, he has introduced more serious subjects in his work since the 1990s, including Damned the Day I Met You and My Best Enemy.

== Early life ==
Carlo Verdone was born in Rome to Mario Verdone, an important Italian film critic and academic, and studied at the Italian Liceo classico in Rome, having the future actor Christian De Sica as his deskmate.

Verdone earned a degree in Modern Literature at Sapienza University of Rome, the same university where his father taught, and a degree in Film Direction at the Centro Sperimentale di Cinematografia. During the 1970s he started a television career highlighting his varied comic style, while also appearing in ads for the Carosello show. He began introducing his characters on television in 1978 in the popular comedy series Non Stop.

== Career ==
Verdone made his debut as a director in 1980 with the movie Fun Is Beautiful, in which he played three different characters. He used the same formula of the first work in 1981, when he directed Bianco, rosso e Verdone, a movie about three different men during election day in Italy. The movie, produced by his mentor Sergio Leone, was very successful in Italy and had a soundtrack composed by Ennio Morricone. In 1982 he wrote and directed the successful and critically acclaimed romantic comedy Talcum Powder, which received multiple David di Donatello awards in Italy for Best Film, Best Actor, Best Actress, Best Score and Best Supporting Actor (to Angelo Infanti). It also won Silver Ribbons for Best Actress and for Best Score.

He and Alberto Sordi wrote two Verdone films together: Journey with Papà, directed by Sordi, and Troppo forte, directed by Verdone and co-written as well by Sergio Leone.

Since the 1990s, Verdone has tackled more serious subjects in his work, like the excesses of modern society and the individual's hardships in confronting it; some examples are Damned the Day I Met You (1992), My Best Enemy (2006) and Me, Them and Lara (2010).

In 1999 he wrote the book "Fatti Coatti". In 2005 he took part in the Italian blockbuster romantic comedy named Manual of Love, and in the sequels named Manual of Love 2 (2007) and The Ages of Love (2011), both directed by Giovanni Veronesi, while in 2013 he starred in Paolo Sorrentino's The Great Beauty.

In 2018 he directed Blessed Madness, which he co-wrote with Nicola Guaglianone and the cartoonist and screenwriter Menotti.

== Personal life ==
In 1980 Verdone married Gianna Scarpelli, and they had two children together, Giulia (born 1986) and Paolo (born 1988). They separated in 1996.

Verdone has two siblings: Luca, a film director, and Silvia, a film producer and wife of the actor Christian De Sica.

== Filmography ==
=== Film ===
Year	Title	Credited as			Role	Notes
Year	Title	Actor	Director	Writer	Role	Notes
1969	Poesia solare	No	Yes	Yes	None	Short film
1971	Allegoria di primavera	No	Yes	Yes	None	Short film
1972	24 ore... non un minuto di più	Yes	No	No	Bodyguard	Uncredited
1973	Elegia notturna	No	Yes	Yes	None	Short film
1976	Quel movimento che mi piace tanto	Yes	No	No	Bar Customer	Uncredited
1979	La Luna	Yes	No	No	Caracalla Director	
1980	Fun Is Beautiful	Yes	Yes	Yes	Enzo / Ruggero / Leo / Alfio / Anselmo	Full-length project directing debut
1981	Bianco, rosso e Verdone	Yes	Yes	Yes	Pasquale Amitrano / Furio Zoccano / Mimmo	
1982	Talcum Powder	Yes	Yes	Yes	Sergio Benvenuti	
1982	Journey with Papa	Yes	No	Yes	Cristiano D'Ambrosi	
1982	Grand Hotel Excelsior	Yes	No	No	Pericle Coccia	
1983	Acqua e sapone	Yes	Yes	Yes	Rolando Ferrazza	
1984	Cuori nella tormenta	Yes	No	Yes	Walter Migliorini	
1984	I due carabinieri	Yes	Yes	Yes	Marino Spada	
1986	Troppo forte	Yes	Yes	Yes	Oscar Pettinari	
1986	7 chili in 7 giorni	Yes	No	No	Alfio Tamburini	
1987	Io e mia sorella	Yes	Yes	Yes	Carlo Piergentili	
1988	Compagni di scuola	Yes	Yes	Yes	Piero Ruffolo	
1989	Il bambino e il poliziotto	Yes	Yes	Yes	Carlo Vinciguerra	
1990	Stasera a casa di Alice	Yes	Yes	Yes	Saverio	
1992	Damned the Day I Met You	Yes	Yes	Yes	Bernando Arbusti	
1992	Al lupo al lupo	Yes	Yes	Yes	Gregorio Sagonà	
1994	Let's Not Keep in Touch	Yes	Yes	Yes	Gepy Fuxas	
1995	Viaggi di nozze	Yes	Yes	Yes	Raniero Cotti Borroni / Ivano / Giovannino / Giovannino's uncle	
1996	I'm Crazy About Iris Blond	Yes	Yes	Yes	Romeo Spera	
1998	Gallo cedrone	Yes	Yes	Yes	Armando Feroci	
1998	Lucky and Zorba	Yes	No	No	Zorba	Voice role
2000	A Chinese in a Coma	Yes	Yes	Yes	Ercole Preziosi	
2000	Zora the Vampire	Yes	No	No	Inspector Lombardi	Also producer
2003	It Can't Be All Our Fault	Yes	Yes	Yes	Galeazzo "Gegè" Tinacci	
2004	Love Is Eternal While It Lasts	Yes	Yes	Yes	Gilberto Mercuri	
2005	Manual of Love	Yes	No	No	Goffredo	
2006	My Best Enemy	Yes	Yes	Yes	Achille De Bellis	
2007	Manual of Love 2	Yes	No	No	Ernesto	
2008	Grande, grosso e... Verdone	Yes	Yes	Yes	Leo Nuvolone / Callisto Cagnato / Moreno Vechiarutti	
2009	Italians	Yes	No	No	Dr. Giulio Cesare Carminati	Segment: "Secondo episodio"
2009	A Question of the Heart	Yes	No	No	Himself	Cameo
2010	Me, Them and Lara	Yes	Yes	Yes	Carlo Mascolo	
2011	The Ages of Love	Yes	No	No	Fabio Renzullo	
2012	A Flat for Three	Yes	Yes	Yes	Ulisse Diamanti	
2013	The Great Beauty	Yes	No	No	Romano	
2013	Alberto il grande	No	Yes	No	None	Documentary film
2014	Sotto una buona stella	Yes	Yes	Yes	Federico Picchioni	
2016	The Big Score	Yes	Yes	Yes	Arturo Merlino	
2018	Blessed Madness	Yes	Yes	Yes	Guglielmo Pantalei	
2018	Vinilici: Perché il vinile ama la musica	Yes	No	No	Himself	Documentary film
2021	Roma Caput Disco	Yes	No	No	Himself	Documentary film
2021	Si vive una volta sola	Yes	Yes	Yes	Umberto Gastaldi	
2021	Ennio	Yes	No	No	Himself	Documentary film
2022	Sergio Leone: The Italian Who Invented America	Yes	No	No	Himself	Documentary film
2023	Pier Paolo Pasolini: Una visione nuova	Yes	No	No	Himself	Documentary film
2025	La scuola romana delle risate	Yes	No	No	Narrator	Voice role
2026	Scuola di seduzione	Yes	Yes	Yes	Clemente	

=== Television ===
Year	Title	Role	Notes
1981	Morto Troisi, viva Troisi	Himself	Television movie
1982	Che fai… ridi?	Himself	Episode: "Un sacco Verdone"
1985	Sogni e bisogni	Armando	Episode: "L'imbiancone"
1999	Pillole, capsule e supposte	Various	Television movie; also writer and director
2021–2025	Vita da Carlo	Himself (fictional version)	Lead role; also co-creator, co-writer and co-director

=== Music videos ===
Year	Title	Artist(s)	Notes
1991	"Benvenuti in paradiso"	Antonello Venditti	
1999	"Mi piaci"	Alex Britti	
2002	"Un colpo in un istante"	Delta-V	
2007	"Eppure sentire (Un senso di te)"	Elisa	
2008	"Meraviglioso"	Negramaro	
2011	"La ragazza del lunedì (Silvio)"	Antonello Venditti	
2017	"Se mi ami davvero"	Mina and Adriano Celentano	
2020	"Che poi"	Carl Brave	
2021	"Domenica"	Tiromancino	
2024	"Tu sei il mattino"	Lucio Corsi	

== Awards and nominations ==
Award	Year	Category	Nominated work	Result
Alpe d'Huez International Comedy Film Festival	2007	Audience Award	My Best Enemy	Won
Bastia Italian Film Festival	2007	Audience Award	My Best Enemy	Won
Bastia Italian Film Festival	2011	Grand Jury Award	Me, Them and Lara	Nominated
Ciak d'Oro	1988	Special Award	Io e mia sorella	Won
Ciak d'Oro	1989	Best Screenplay	Compagni di scuola	Nominated
Ciak d'Oro	2005	Best Actor	Manual of Love	Won
Ciak d'Oro	2014	Best Supporting Actor	The Great Beauty	Won
Ciak d'Oro	2018	Best Comedy Film	Blessed Madness	Nominated
Cinematografo Award	2025	Best TV Series	Vita da Carlo	Won
David di Donatello	1980	Special David Award	Fun Is Beautiful	Won
David di Donatello	1981	Best Actor	Bianco, rosso e Verdone	Nominated
David di Donatello	1982	Best Film	Talcum Powder	Won
David di Donatello	1982	Best Director	Talcum Powder	Nominated
David di Donatello	1982	Best Screenplay	Talcum Powder	Nominated
David di Donatello	1982	Best Actor	Talcum Powder	Won
David di Donatello	1988	Best Screenplay	Io e mia sorella	Won
David di Donatello	1988	Best Actor	Io e mia sorella	Nominated
David di Donatello	1989	Best Screenplay	Compagni di scuola	Nominated
David di Donatello	1989	Best Actor	Compagni di scuola	Nominated
David di Donatello	1992	Best Film	Damned the Day I Met You	Nominated
David di Donatello	1992	Best Director	Damned the Day I Met You	Nominated
David di Donatello	1992	Best Screenplay	Damned the Day I Met You	Won
David di Donatello	1992	Best Actor	Damned the Day I Met You	Won
David di Donatello	1994	Best Film	Let's Not Keep in Touch	Nominated
David di Donatello	1994	Best Director	Let's Not Keep in Touch	Won
David di Donatello	1994	Best Screenplay	Let's Not Keep in Touch	Nominated
David di Donatello	1997	Best Actor	I'm Crazy About Iris Blond	Nominated
David di Donatello	2000	Best Actor	A Chinese in a Coma	Nominated
David di Donatello	2003	Best Screenplay	It Can't Be All Our Fault	Nominated
David di Donatello	2004	Best Actor	Love Is Eternal While It Lasts	Nominated
David di Donatello	2005	Best Supporting Actor	Manual of Love	Won
David di Donatello	2006	Best Film	My Best Enemy	Nominated
David di Donatello	2006	Best Director	My Best Enemy	Nominated
David di Donatello	2006	Best Screenplay	My Best Enemy	Nominated
David di Donatello	2006	Best Actor	My Best Enemy	Nominated
David di Donatello	2006	Young David Award	My Best Enemy	Nominated
David di Donatello	2008	Special David Award	Grande, grosso e... Verdone	Won
David di Donatello	2010	Young David Award	Me, Them and Lara	Nominated
David di Donatello	2014	Best Supporting Actor	The Great Beauty	Nominated
Flaiano Award	2020	Special Award	Himself	Won
Globo d'Oro	1992	Best Film	Damned the Day I Met You	Nominated
Globo d'Oro	1992	Best Screenplay	Damned the Day I Met You	Nominated
Globo d'Oro	1992	Best Actor	Damned the Day I Met You	Won
Globo d'Oro	2004	Best Actor	Love Is Eternal While It Lasts	Nominated
Globo d'Oro	2010	Best Comedy Film	Me, Them and Lara	Won
Globo d'Oro	2022	Honorary Award	Himself	Won
Grolla d'oro	2003	Best Actor	It Can't Be All Our Fault	Won
Kineo Award	2006	Best Director	My Best Enemy	Won
La pellicola d'oro	2025	Best Actor	Vita da Carlo	Nominated
Nastro d'Argento	1980	Best Breakthrough Actor	Fun Is Beautiful	Won
Nastro d'Argento	1986	Best Actor	Troppo forte	Nominated
Nastro d'Argento	1988	Best Director	Io e mia sorella	Nominated
Nastro d'Argento	1988	Best Actor	Io e mia sorella	Nominated
Nastro d'Argento	1993	Best Script	Al lupo al lupo	Won
Nastro d'Argento	2000	Best Actor	A Chinese in a Coma	Nominated
Nastro d'Argento	2003	Best Script	It Can't Be All Our Fault	Nominated
Nastro d'Argento	2003	Special Nastro d'Argento	It Can't Be All Our Fault	Won
Nastro d'Argento	2005	Best Actor	Love Is Eternal While It Lasts	Nominated
Nastro d'Argento	2006	Best Supporting Actor	Manual of Love	Won
Nastro d'Argento	2007	Best Actor	My Best Enemy	Nominated
Nastro d'Argento	2008	Nastro d'Argento of the Year	Grande, grosso e... Verdone	Won
Nastro d'Argento	2010	Best Comedy Film	Me, Them and Lara	Nominated
Nastro d'Argento	2010	Best Script	Me, Them and Lara	Won
Nastro d'Argento	2012	Best Comedy Film	A Flat for Three	Won
Nastro d'Argento	2012	Best Screenplay	A Flat for Three	Nominated
Nastro d'Argento	2012	Thun Foundation Special Award	A Flat for Three	Won
Nastro d'Argento	2014	Best Comedy Film	Sotto una buona stella	Nominated
Nastro d'Argento	2014	Special Nastro d'Argento	The Great Beauty	Won
Nastro d'Argento	2016	Nino Manfredi Award	The Big Score	Won
Nastro d'Argento	2018	Best Comedy Film	Blessed Madness	Nominated
Nastro d'Argento	2018	Best Comedy Actor	Blessed Madness	Nominated
Nastro d'Argento	2021	Best Comedy Film	Si vive una volta sola	Nominated
Rome Film Festival	2021	Best TV Series	Vita da Carlo	Won
