= Danilo Desideri =

Italian cinematographer (born 1940)

- Born: 13 July 1940 (age 84); Rome, Italy
- Occupation: Cinematographer
- Years active: 1962—present

Danilo Desideri (born 13 July 1940) is an Italian cinematographer.

Born in Rome, Desideri began his film career in the late 1950s as a camera assistant on the crew of Tonino Delli Colli. He later worked as a camera operator with Gianni Di Venanzo, Ennio Guarnieri, Giuseppe Rotunno, and Luigi Kuveiller, among others. After working in the advertising field, he made his debut as cinematographer for films in the late 60s; his first major production was the film In the Name of the Pope King (1977), directed by Luigi Magni. In 1983, he collaborated for the first time with Carlo Verdone, beginning a professional association that characterized his career in the following decades. Desideri won the 1992 David di Donatello for Best Cinematography for Verdone's Damned the Day I Met You.
