= Diabolik: Ginko Attacks! =

2022 Italian film by the Manetti Bros.

- Italian theatrical release poster
- Italian: Diabolik – Ginko all'attacco!
- Directed by: Manetti Bros.
- Written by: Manetti Bros.; Michelangelo La Neve
- Based on: Ginko all'attacco by Angela and Luciana Giussani
- Produced by: Carlo Macchitella; Manetti Bros.
- Starring: Giacomo Gianniotti; Miriam Leone; Valerio Mastandrea; Monica Bellucci
- Cinematography: Angelo Sorrentino
- Edited by: Federico Maria Maneschi
- Music by: Pivio and Aldo De Scalzi
- Production companies: Mompracem; Astorina; Bleidwin; Rai Cinema
- Distributed by: 01 Distribution
- Release date: 17 November 2022 (Italy)
- Running time: 116 minutes
- Country: Italy
- Language: Italian
- Budget: €15 million
- Box office: $1.3 million

Diabolik: Ginko Attacks! (Italian: Diabolik – Ginko all'attacco!) is a 2022 Italian crime action film directed by the Manetti Bros. and based on the 1968 Diabolik comic strip Ginko all'attacco by Angela and Luciana Giussani. Its theatrical release was in Italy on 17 November 2022. It is the sequel of the 2021 film Diabolik, and was followed by the 2023 film Diabolik: Who Are You?.

== Plot ==
Diabolik and Eva Kant team up against Inspector Ginko.

== Cast ==
- Giacomo Gianniotti as Diabolik
- Miriam Leone as Eva Kant
- Valerio Mastandrea as Inspector Ginko
- Monica Bellucci as Altea di Vallenberg
- Alessio Lapice as Roller
- Linda Caridi as Elena Vanel
- Pier Giorgio Bellocchio as Sergeant Palmer
- Ester Pantano as Sergeant Burrov
- Andrea Roncato as Barbo
- Amanda Campana as the make-up artist
- Urbano Barberini as Minister Duncan
- Bernardo Casertano as Sergeant Alton
- Giacomo Giorgio as officer Zeman
- Simone Leonardi as the officer at Armen's
- Pierangelo Menci as Poldo
- Marco Bonadei as officer Urban
- G-Max as the museum's chief guard
- Gustavo Frigerio as Osvaldo the butler
- Diodato as the singer at Armen's

== Production ==
Filming took place in late 2021 in Trieste, Premariacco, and Milan.

== Release ==
The film was released theatrically in Italy on 17 November 2022.
