= Diabolik (2021 film) =

2021 Italian film by the Manetti Bros.

- Theatrical release poster
- Directed by: Manetti Bros.
- Screenplay by: Manetti Bros.; Michelangelo La Neve
- Story by: Manetti Bros.; Michelangelo La Neve; Mario Gomboli
- Based on: Diabolik by Angela and Luciana Giussani
- Produced by: Carlo Macchitella; Manetti Bros.
- Starring: Luca Marinelli; Miriam Leone; Valerio Mastandrea; Alessandro Roja; Serena Rossi; Roberto Citran; Luca Di Giovanni; Antonino Iuorio; Vanessa Scalera; Daniela Piperno; Pier Giorgio Bellocchio; Claudia Gerini
- Cinematography: Francesca Amitrano
- Edited by: Federico Maria Maneschi
- Music by: Pivio and Aldo De Scalzi; Manuel Agnelli
- Production companies: Mompracem; Rai Cinema
- Distributed by: 01 Distribution
- Release dates: 15 December 2021 (Noir in Festival); 16 December 2021 (Italy)
- Running time: 133 minutes
- Country: Italy
- Language: Italian
- Budget: €10 million
- Box office: $3.2 million

Diabolik is a 2021 Italian crime action film directed by the Manetti Bros. and based on the comic series of the same name. It is the second film adaptation of Diabolik, after Mario Bava's Danger: Diabolik (1968).

The film premiered at the Noir in Festival on 15 December 2021, and was released theatrically in Italy the following day by 01 Distribution. It is followed by two sequels: Diabolik: Ginko Attacks! (2022) and Diabolik: Who Are You? (2023).

== Plot ==
Legendary thief Diabolik plans his next heist: stealing a valuable diamond from heiress Eva Kant, who is dating the deputy minister of justice, Giorgio Caron. Using one of his trademark masks to impersonate his nemesis, Inspector Ginko, Diabolik tricks Eva into revealing which hotel she will be staying at. He makes another mask to pose as one of the wait staff assigned to her room, and quickly locates the hidden safe where the diamond is kept. However, upon seeing Eva, he becomes infatuated with her.

Diabolik sneaks into Eva's room to steal the diamond, but Eva walks in on him, and he has no choice but to hold her at knifepoint. Eva calmly reveals that she doesn't have the diamond, having already sold it to a dealer in South Africa, and Diabolik leaves. The next day, he returns and unmasks himself in front of Eva; disgusted by the lecherous Giorgio, she starts an affair with him. Unbeknownst to Diabolik, his girlfriend Elisabeth, from whom he has hidden the truth about who he really is, accidentally uncovers his secret hideout. Ginko is notified and arranges a sting operation, resulting in Diabolik's arrest.

At trial, Diabolik is convicted and sentenced to be beheaded via guillotine. When Eva learns of his fate, she has Giorgio use his influence to arrange a clandestine meeting in Diabolik's cell. Once the guards leave, Eva incapacitates Giorgio and Diabolik questions him to learn where he is keeping a file containing information as to Eva's unsavory past, which he had been using to blackmail her. He then dons a mask of Giorgio's face and puts on his clothes to escape, while a drugged Giorgio is fitted with a Diabolik mask and executed in his place. Ginko figures out the deception in time to stop Diabolik from retrieving the file; one of his officers finds it instead.

Needing money to flee the country, Diabolik targets a bank holding expensive jewelry and watches. He has Eva impersonate a rich widow named Ms. Morel to rent a vault. This enables her to learn about the bank's security features so Diabolik can figure out how to bypass them by flooding the bank and using diving equipment to steal the jewels and watches. Ginko, using his knowledge of Diabolik's modus operandi, is able to determine his escape route and briefly holds him at gunpoint before Eva distracts him and he is overpowered by Diabolik. The two make their getaway on a motorboat while Ginko can only watch in defeat.

Sometime later, Diabolik and Eva are on a yacht. To cement their new partnership, he presents her with the diamond, but Eva throws it into the ocean, affirming that she no longer wants to be burdened by her past.

== Cast ==
- Luca Marinelli as Diabolik
- Miriam Leone as Eva Kant
- Valerio Mastandrea as Inspector Ginko
- Alessandro Roja as Giorgio Caron
- Serena Rossi as Elisabeth Gay
- Luca Di Giovanni as Roberto, the waiter disguise used by Diabolik
- Vanessa Scalera as Caron's secretary
- Roberto Citran as the hotel manager
- Antonino Iuorio as the prison warden
- Daniela Piperno as the bank manager
- Pier Giorgio Bellocchio as Palmer, an officer under Ginko's command
- Guglielmo Favilla as Florian, an officer under Ginko's command
- Urbano Barberini as Duncan
- Giovanni Calcagno as a fireman
- Davide Devenuto as Inspector Driskell, Ginko's colleague
- Stefano Pesce as the prosecutor in Diabolik's trial
- Massimo Triggiani as Diabolik's lawyer
- Claudia Gerini as Ms. Morel, the socialite disguise used by Eva

== Release ==
Diabolik premiered as the closing film of the 31st Noir in Festival on 15 December 2021, and was released theatrically in Italy the following day by 01 Distribution. It was originally set to be released on 31 December 2020, but was postponed due to the COVID-19 pandemic in Italy.

The film was released digitally in Canada on 20 May 2022 by Mongrel Media. In February 2023, Kino Lorber acquired the rights to the Diabolik trilogy in the United States.

== Sequels ==
In April 2021, 01 Distribution announced two sequels to Diabolik, which began filming that October. The first sequel, titled Diabolik: Ginko Attacks!, was released on 17 November 2022, also directed by the Manetti Bros. Leone and Mastandrea reprise their roles in the sequel, with Giacomo Gianniotti replacing Marinelli as Diabolik. The third and final installment in the trilogy, Diabolik: Who Are You?, was released on 30 November 2023.
