= Enzo Facciolo =

Italian designer (1931–2021)

Enzo Facciolo (2 October 1931 – 13 August 2021) was an Italian artist who was known for Diabolik comic work.

== Biography ==
After attending the School of Art at the Castello Sforzesco, he founded an animation studio with practically no experience in the field and then shortly afterwards moved on to collaborate in 1954 with the Pagot brothers with whom he would work for about a year, along with a team of animators; making commercials and short films; in 1959 he made his debut in comics by writing and drawing the short series Clint Due Colpi for Edizioni Domai. Thanks to his experience in the field of animation, in 1963 the Astorina house hired him with the task of unifying the drawings of the Diabolik comic series, redefining the graphic characterization of the characters compared to the previous versions at the request of the two authors. In the 1963 debut album, episode no. 10 "The Hanged Man," the protagonist character does not appear with his features as he is always disguised and thus the first story where he will actually draw the protagonist as well will be in the next issue, "Hell's Trap"; with these early realizations he proved his abilities such that he obtained the graphic responsibility of the character. At the request of the Giussani sisters, he was inspired by the actor Robert Taylor (American actor) to improve his graphic characterization, devising the iconic look of the protagonist, characterizing his typical movements and facial expressions as well as defining his costume and characteristic mask instead of the shapeless hood of the early days; this characterization became the reference point for the other cartoonists.

He would also characterize the sidekicks, such as Inspector Ginko, Eva Kant, as well as Altea of Vallemberg; for the latter he would be inspired by the French actress Capucine, who was very famous at the time. Years later one of his drawings (representing Diabolik throwing the dagger) would be employed by the same Astorina publishing house as its own logo. During that time he would work alongside illustrators Glauco Coretti and Armando Bonato, working in tandem with both of them producing stories that later became famous such as "Diabolik, who are you?" He would draw both stories and covers for the series. In his long collaboration with the title, he did both pencil drawings and ink inking, producing more than two hundred episodes.

In the meantime, he would also begin a collaboration with graphic designer and painter Elio Silvestri, with whom he would also rent a room in the publishing house to draw cartoons, advertising campaigns, and illustrations; theirs is the famous black chick character "Calimero" for Miralanza's advertisements on Carosello.

In 1979 he left "Diabolik" to devote himself to advertising graphics, he went to New York City to a friend who had opened an advertising agency in the U.S. He decided to become a partner in it and in turn open an Italian branch, initially named "Ronne Bonder Studio" later to become "Meta"; in the following years he worked for Italian advertising agencies creating as a graphic designer campaigns for Ferrarelle, Collistar, Alitalia, Fernet Branca, and many others.

Since 2009 he began an intense collaboration with the Spazio Papel art gallery in Milan, where group and solo exhibitions with his original works are organized every year. He died on August 13, 2021, at the age of 89.

== Early life and career ==
Facciolo was born on 2 October 1931, in Milan, Italy, and was educated at Scuola d'Arte al Castello Sforzesco.

In 1959, he wrote and drew his first comic strip.

In 1963, he started working on Diabolik.

On 13 August 2021, Facciolo died at the age of 89.
