= You Came Back =

2020 Italian drama thriller film

- Theatrical release poster
- Italian: Lasciami andare
- Directed by: Stefano Mordini
- Screenplay by: Stefano Mordini; Francesca Marciano; Luca Infascelli
- Story by: Stefano Mordini
- Based on: You Came Back by Christopher Coake
- Produced by: Roberto Sessa
- Starring: Stefano Accorsi; Valeria Golino; Maya Sansa; Serena Rossi
- Cinematography: Luigi Martinucci
- Edited by: Massimo Fiocchi
- Music by: Fabio Barovero
- Production companies: Warner Bros. Entertainment Italia; Picomedia
- Distributed by: Warner Bros. Pictures
- Release dates: 11 September 2020 (Venice); 8 October 2020 (Italy)
- Running time: 98 minutes
- Country: Italy
- Language: Italian

You Came Back (Italian: Lasciami andare, lit. 'Let me go') is a 2020 Italian drama thriller film directed by Stefano Mordini, based on the 2012 novel of the same name by Christopher Coake. It stars Stefano Accorsi, Valeria Golino, Maya Sansa and Serena Rossi.

It was selected out of competition as the closing film of the 77th Venice International Film Festival.

== Cast ==
- Stefano Accorsi as Marco
- Valeria Golino as Perla
- Maya Sansa as Clara
- Serena Rossi as Anita
- Antonia Truppo
- Lino Musella
- Elio De Capitani
