= Diabolik: Who Are You? =

2023 Italian film by the Manetti Bros.

- Italian theatrical release poster
- Italian: Diabolik – Chi sei?
- Directed by: Manetti Bros.
- Written by: Manetti Bros.
- Based on: Diabolik, chi sei? by Angela and Luciana Giussani
- Produced by: Pier Giorgio Bellocchio
- Starring: Giacomo Gianniotti; Miriam Leone; Valerio Mastandrea; Monica Bellucci
- Cinematography: Angelo Sorrentino
- Edited by: Federico Maria Maneschi
- Music by: Pivio and Aldo De Scalzi
- Production companies: Mompracem; Rai Cinema; Astorina; Bleidwin
- Distributed by: 01 Distribution
- Release dates: 20 October 2023 (Rome); 30 November 2023 (Italy)
- Running time: 124 minutes
- Country: Italy
- Language: Italian
- Box office: $683,424

Diabolik: Who Are You? (Italian: Diabolik – Chi sei?) is a 2023 Italian crime action film directed by the Manetti Bros. and based on the 1968 Diabolik comic strip Diabolik, chi sei? by Angela and Luciana Giussani. It premiered at the 18th Rome Film Festival on 10 October 2023 before receiving a theatrical release in Italy on 30 November 2023. It follows the events of the 2021 film Diabolik and the 2022 film Diabolik: Ginko Attacks!.

== Plot ==
Diabolik and Eva Kant create a plan to target wealthy aristocrat Countess Wiendemar: Diabolik kidnaps Gabriella Bauer, the countess's banker, so Eva can impersonate her and steal a collection of valuable ancient coins, ending with Diabolik arriving in a getaway car for their escape. Everything goes according to plan until a gang of armed men suddenly storm the bank, murder Countess Wiendemar in front of Eva, and make off with the coins as part of their haul.

Inspector Ginko is assigned to investigate the robbery, aided by his longtime friend Sergeant Palmer. The two manage to identify the ringleader as Diego Manden, a libertine criminal mastermind who hides behind the facade of a prominent lawyer. Diabolik also learns the identity of Manden, and he and Eva ultiize their disguise skills to follow Manden, learn his routine, and eventually, locate his private mansion. Eager to steal back the coins and believing that Manden is alone, Diabolik tries to break in himself and gets ambushed by Manden's gang.

Waking up in the basement, he is surprised to find Ginko there as well; the inspector admits he had attempted the same plan earlier, but that he expects Palmer to pull a rescue any second. Unfortunately, Palmer is caught, and to Ginko's horror, murdered and dumped in the trunk of an abandoned car. As the police were not informed of the operation, Ginko informs Diabolik that no one else is likely to find them. Realizing that their deaths are certain, Ginko asks for one final favor: that Diabolik share his past so that the inspector may finally know his nemesis.

Diabolik admits that he knows little of his past. He was orphaned as a young boy and raised by a secret society of criminals on a remote island, led by a famous thief known only as "King". King was impressed by Diabolik's skills and cunning, and eventually seemed poised to make the young man his heir. However, Diabolik then learned that such hopes were false and that his mentor feared him and was plotting his murder. Diabolik struck first, stabbing King dead and using his newly invented mask technology to take his place, thereby obtaining the resources to begin his criminal career.

Eva, struggling with Diabolik's sudden disappearance, sees a news report featuring Ginko's estranged fiancée Altea di Vallenberg; the broadcast contains a coded reference to the last time the two women crossed paths. In disguise as Altea's former stylist, Eva meets with di Vallenberg, who explains what happened to Ginko and Diabolik. She offers to help Eva out of sympathy, and the two travel to Diabolik's secret lair to craft a new rescue plan.

Manden orders Loris, one of his men, to execute Ginko and Diabolik, but the two work together to overpower their assassin and break his neck. Manden's remaining men are lured outside by Eva in Diabolik's car, which uses bulletproof shielding to distract them as she slips inside and picks them off one by one. Manden tries to surrender, only to be shot with a tranquilizer dart. Eva then finds the two men and reveals herself as Altea in disguise while the real Eva shows up to help free the captives. Just then, Eva double-crosses and subdues both Altea and Ginko.

Waking up, Altea finds that Eva and Diabolik are gone, but that a grateful Eva has secretly returned Altea's Black Panther necklace to her. At Palmer's funeral, Ginko kisses Altea and declares his intention to marry her. The film ends with Diabolik and Eva disguised as an elderly couple to rob an auction, with Eva regaining possession of her pink diamond from the first film.

== Cast ==
- Giacomo Gianniotti as Diabolik
  - Andrea Arru as Diabolik at 12 years old
  - Lorenzo Zurzolo as Diabolik at 20 years old
- Miriam Leone as Eva Kant
- Valerio Mastandrea as Inspector Ginko
- Monica Bellucci as Altea di Vallenberg
- Pier Giorgio Bellocchio as Sergeant Palmer
- Chiara Martegiani as Elisa Coen, the wife of one of Manden's thugs
- Massimiliano Rossi as Diego Manden
- Mario Sgueglia as Emilio, one of Manden's gang
- Francesco Turbanti as Loris, one of Manden's gang
- Emanuele Linfatti as Martin, one of Manden's gang
- Michele Ragno as Vladimiro, one of Manden's gang
- Amanda Campana as Altea's former makeup artist
- Max Gazzè as Giulio Bruner, a false identity used by Diabolik
- Carolina Crescentini as Gabriella Bauer, a banker who has her identity stolen by Eva for a heist
- Paolo Calabresi as King, Diabolik's mentor
- Barbara Bouchet as Countess Wiendemar, Diabolik and Eva's mark
- Sara Drago as Gianna Cliner, a stripper and Manden's interest
- Dirk Ploenissen as Prof. Wolf, King's chemist
- Hal Yamanouchi as Chen Fu, King's expert of poisons and drugs
- Timothy Martin as Suanda, King's engineer
- Paolo Gasparini as Nicolas, Altea's driver
- Filippo Pagotto as Theo, Altea's bodyguard
- Danilo De Summa as Luca Coen, Elisa's husband and Manden's man
- Giacomo Giorgio as officer Zeman
- Paolo Mixo as Lisard, a coin appraiser
- Greta Zuccoli as Bruner's lover, a false identity used by Eva

== Production ==
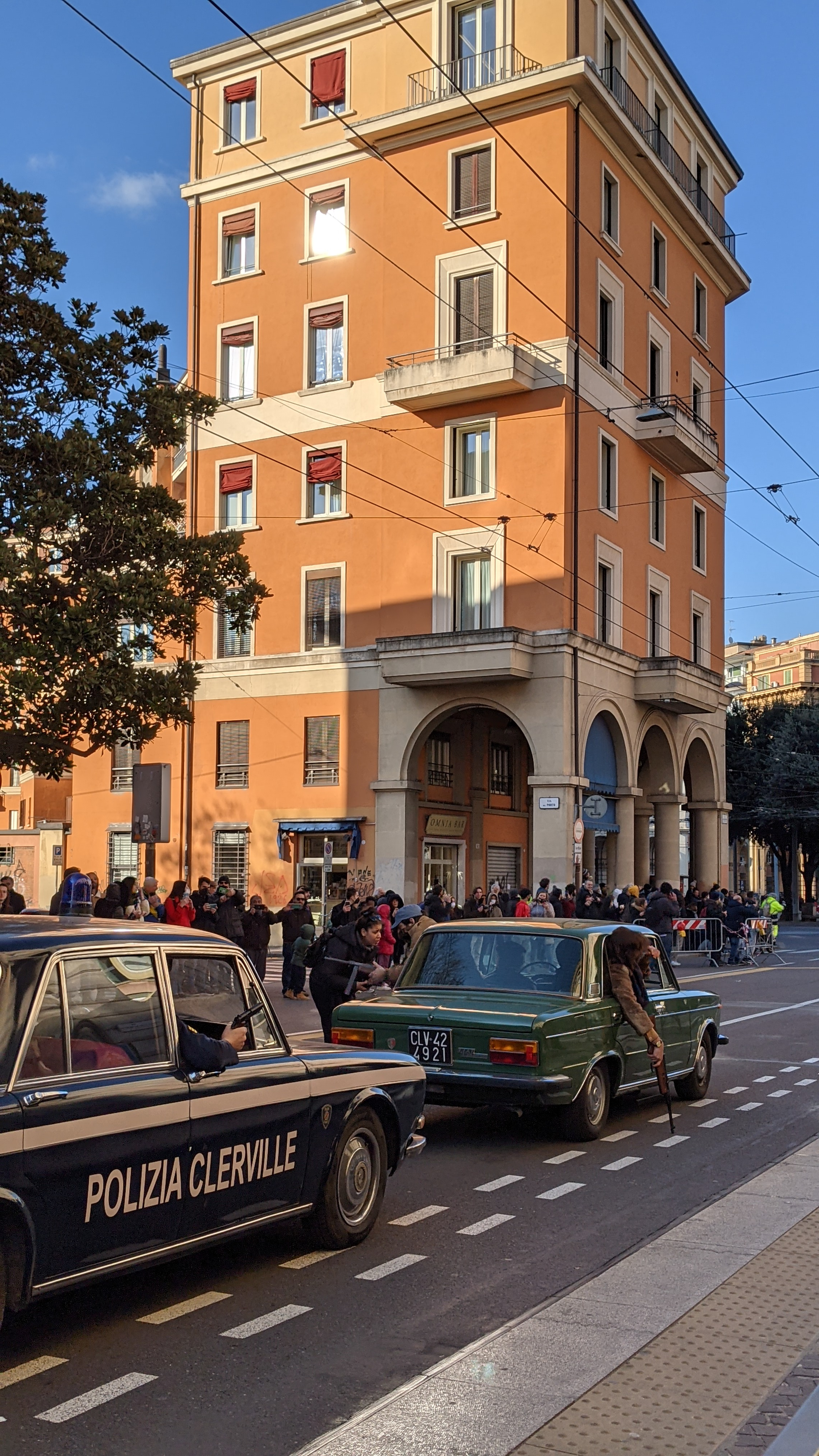
Filming of a car chase scene on the set of the film at Bologna.

Filming took place in late 2022 in Trieste, Palmi, and Dino.

== Release ==
The film premiered at the 18th Rome Film Festival on 10 October 2023. It later received a theatrical release in Italy on 30 November 2023.
