= List of best-selling comic series =

This page provides lists of best-selling comic book series to date. It includes Japanese manga, American comic books, and European comics. This list includes comic books that have sold at least 100 million copies.

There are three separate lists, for three different comic book publication formats: collected comic book volumes, periodical single-issue floppy comics, and comic magazines. They are separated because the sales figures of these publication formats are not directly comparable.

== Collected comic book volumes ==
This list is for comics printed in a traditional book format (paperback or hardcover), typically with a similar number of pages as novels. The list includes graphic novels printed exclusively in this format, and trade paperback/hardcover books which compile periodical comic chapters/issues into larger collected volumes. Japanese manga tankōbon volumes and European comic albums account for the vast majority of collected comic book volume sales. American trade paperbacks and graphic novels are also included in the list.

These comic series were originally serialized either as chapters (typically 15-30 pages each) in comic publications (such as comic magazines) or as single-page comic strips in non-comic publications (such as newspapers), before being collected into a larger comic book volume (which compiles either multiple comic chapters or numerous comic strips). For comic series originally serialized as chapters in comic magazines or manga magazines, their estimated circulation figures in those magazines are given in footnotes.

Denotes comic series currently running

Comic series	Creator(s)	Publisher	No. of collected volumes	Serialized	Approximate sales
One Piece	Eiichiro Oda	Shueisha	114	Weekly Shōnen Jump; 1997 – present	600 million†
Asterix	René Goscinny; Albert Uderzo	Dargaud; Les Éditions Albert René	41	1959 – present (Note: Serialized in Pilote in 1959 – 1973. Collected comic album releases of the Pilote comics were published in 1961 – 1973. Since 1974, each instalment has been published as a complete album with no prior magazine serialization.)	393 million (Note: In addition to comic album sales, Asterix had a total estimated circulation of approximately 93.5 million copies in the comic magazine Pilote, which serialized Asterix from October 1959 to 1973. (Note: See Pilote § Circulation.))
Spike and Suzy	Willy Vandersteen	Standaard Uitgeverij	384	1945 – present	350 million
Golgo 13	Takao Saito	Shogakukan	219	Big Comic; 1968 – present	300 million†
Lucky Luke	Morris	Dupuis; Dargaud; Lucky Comics	84	1946 – present	300 million
Peanuts	Charles M. Schulz	—N/a	—N/a	1950 – 2000	300 million
Doraemon	Fujiko F. Fujio	Shogakukan	45	CoroCoro Comic and other Shogakukan children's magazines 1969 - 1996	300 million
Case Closed	Gosho Aoyama	Shogakukan	107	Weekly Shōnen Sunday; 1994 – present	270 million (Note: In addition to tankōbon volume sales, Case Closed / Detective Conan chapters have had a total estimated circulation of approximately 1.3 billion copies in Weekly Shōnen Sunday magazine, which has been serializing Detective Conan since January 1994. (Note: See Weekly Shōnen Sunday § Circulation))
Dragon Ball	Akira Toriyama	Shueisha	42	Weekly Shōnen Jump; 1984–1995	260 million
Naruto	Masashi Kishimoto	Shueisha	72	Weekly Shōnen Jump; 1999 – 2014	250 million (Note: In addition to tankōbon volume sales, Naruto chapters had a total estimated circulation of approximately 2.3 billion copies in the manga magazine Weekly Shōnen Jump. (Note: See Weekly Shōnen Jump § Manga series))
The Adventures of Tintin	Hergé	Casterman; Le Lombard; Egmont Group	24	1929 – 1976	250 million
Demon Slayer: Kimetsu no Yaiba	Koyoharu Gotouge	Shueisha	23	2016–2020	220 million†‡
Slam Dunk	Takehiko Inoue	Shueisha	31	Weekly Shōnen Jump; 1990 – 1996	185 million (Note: In addition to tankōbon sales, Slam Dunk had a total estimated circulation of approximately 1.7 billion copies in Weekly Shōnen Jump magazine.)
KochiKame: Tokyo Beat Cops	Osamu Akimoto	Shueisha	201	Weekly Shōnen Jump; 1976 – 2016	157.2 million (Note: In addition to tankōbon volume sales, KochiKame chapters had a total estimated circulation of approximately 6 billion copies in the manga magazine Weekly Shōnen Jump.)
Diabolik	Angela Giussani; Luciana Giussani	Astorina	862	1962 – present	150 million
Jujutsu Kaisen	Gege Akutami	Shueisha	30	Weekly Shōnen Jump; 2018 – 2024	150 million†‡
Crayon Shin-chan	Yoshito Usui	Futabasha	65	Manga Action; 1990 – present	148 million (Note: Includes Crayon Shin-chan and its sequel series, New Crayon Shin-chan)
Attack on Titan	Hajime Isayama	Kodansha	34	Bessatsu Shōnen Magazine; 2009 – 2021	140 million
Garfield	Jim Davis	—N/a	—N/a	1978 – present	135 million
Oishinbo	Tetsu Kariya; Akira Hanasaki	Shogakukan	111	Big Comic Spirits; 1983 – 2014	135 million
Bleach	Tite Kubo	Shueisha	74	Weekly Shōnen Jump; 2001 – 2016	130 million (Note: In addition to tankōbon volume sales, Bleach chapters had a total estimated circulation of approximately 2 billion copies in the manga magazine Weekly Shōnen Jump.)
JoJo's Bizarre Adventure	Hirohiko Araki	Shueisha	138	1987 – present	120 million† (Note: In addition to tankōbon sales, JoJo's Bizarre Adventure had a total estimated circulation of approximately 3.6 billion copies in Weekly Shōnen Jump magazine.)
Kingdom	Yasuhisa Hara	Shueisha	78	Weekly Young Jump; 2006 – present	120 million†‡
Amar Chitra Katha		Amar Chitra Katha Pvt. Ltd.	449	1967 – present	100 million
Astro Boy	Osamu Tezuka	Kobunsha	23	Shōnen; 1952 – 1968	100 million
Casper the Friendly Ghost	Seymour Reit and Joe Oriolo	Harvey Comics	—N/a	1949 – present	100 million
Baki the Grappler	Keisuke Itagaki	Akita Shoten	155	Weekly Shōnen Champion; 1991 – present	100 million† (Note: Includes Baki the Grappler's sequel series; New Grappler Baki, Hanma Baki, Baki-Dou, Baki-Dou (2018) and Baki Rahen)
Fist of the North Star	Buronson and Tetsuo Hara	Shueisha	27	Weekly Shōnen Jump; 1983 – 1988	100 million (Note: In addition to tankōbon volume sales, Fist of the North Star chapters had a total estimated circulation of approximately 1.1 billion copies in the manga magazine Weekly Shōnen Jump.)
Hajime no Ippo	George Morikawa	Kodansha	145	Weekly Shōnen Magazine; 1989 – present	100 million†
Hunter × Hunter	Yoshihiro Togashi	Shueisha	38	1998–present	100 million†‡
The Kindaichi Case Files	Yōzaburō Kanari, Seimaru Amagi, Fumiya Satō	Kodansha	101	1992 – present	100 million†
My Hero Academia	Kōhei Horikoshi	Shueisha	42	Weekly Shōnen Jump; 2014 – 2024	100 million†‡
Touch	Mitsuru Adachi	Shogakukan	26	Weekly Shōnen Sunday; 1981 – 1986	100 million

== Periodical single-issue floppy comics ==
This list is for single-issue floppy comics, also known as the American comic book format. Unlike the paperback book format, floppy comics are thinner periodicals and stapled together. Each floppy comic issue is typically 20–40 pages, and usually consists of a single chapter (as opposed to a larger comic book volume that typically includes multiple chapters). A floppy comic is comparable to a comic magazine, but is thinner in size and is dedicated to a single character or group of characters (whereas a comic magazine is thicker and serializes multiple different unrelated series).

Single-issue floppy comics are the most common publication format for American comics, and account for the vast majority of American superhero comic sales. This list also contains periodical publications from other countries that are similarly dedicated to a single character or group of characters. Some of the numbers reported here may also include sales of trade paperback volumes, which account for a small portion of American comic sales.

According to the most recently available data, the best-selling American single-issue comic of all time was X-Men #1, which was published in 1991 and has since sold almost 8.2 million copies.

Comic series	Creator(s)	Publisher	No. of issues	Serialized	Approximate sales
Superman	Jerry Siegel; Joe Shuster	DC Comics	18,732	1938 – present	600 million (Note: While the vast bulk of the sales are from single-issue floppy comics, the number may also include trade paperback volumes, which account for a small portion of the sales.)
Batman	Bob Kane; Bill Finger	DC Comics	23,193	1939 – present	484 million (Note: Batman comic sales – 484.900.656 copies: Up until 2015 – 460 million; 2016 – 5,049,826; 2017 – 4,877,167; 2018 – 4,622,530; 2019 – 6,070,761)
Spider-Man	Stan Lee; Steve Ditko	Marvel	13,500	1963 – present	387 million (Note: Spider-Man comic sales – 384,827,202 copies: Up until April 2014 – 360 million; May–December 2014 – 3,366,050; 2015 – 4,719,795; 2016 – 4,248,366; 2017 – 3,465,005; 2018 – 4,522,479; 2019 – 4,505,507)
X-Men	Stan Lee; Jack Kirby	Marvel	12,000	1963 – present	260 million
Captain America	Joe Simon; Jack Kirby	Marvel	9,000	1941 – present	210 million
Fantastic Four	Stan Lee; Jack Kirby	Marvel	5,899	1961 – present	150 million
Diabolik	Angela Giussani; Luciana Giussani	Astorina	862	1962 – present	150 million
Spawn	Todd McFarlane	Image Comics	600	1992 – present	150 million
The Phantom	Lee Falk	Frew Publications	3,000	1936 – present	150 million

== Comic magazines ==
Cover of Weekly Shōnen Jump issue #1 (1968). Weekly Shōnen Jump is the best-selling comic magazine.

This list is for comic magazines, which are anthology magazines that serialize multiple different unrelated comic series. This list includes Japanese manga magazines, European comic magazines, and English-language comic magazines.

In Japan, manga magazines account for the vast majority of manga sales. Most manga series first appear in manga magazines, before later being sold separately as collected tankobon volumes.

Comic magazine	Publisher	Country	No. of issues	Serialized	Approximate sales
Weekly Shōnen Jump	Shueisha	Japan	2,406	1968 – present	7.6 billion (Note: See Weekly Shōnen Jump § Manga series.)
Weekly Shōnen Magazine	Kodansha	Japan	2,942	1959 – present	5.2 billion (Note: See Weekly Shōnen Magazine § Circulation.)
Weekly Young Jump	Shueisha	Japan	1,765	1979 – present	2.2 billion (Note: See Weekly Young Jump § Circulation)
The Beano	DC Thomson	United Kingdom	4,200+	1938 – present	2 billion
Weekly Shōnen Sunday	Shogakukan	Japan	2,805	1959 – present	1.9 billion (Note: See Weekly Shōnen Sunday § Circulation.)
Weekly Young Magazine	Kodansha	Japan	1,976	1980 – present	1.8 billion (Note: See Weekly Young Magazine § Circulation)
Micky Maus	Egmont Ehapa	Germany	3,169	1951 – present	1 billion (Note: In 1998, the total number of Micky Maus copies ever sold exceeded 1 billion.)
Classics Illustrated	Elliot Publishing Co. Gilberton Company, Inc. Frawley Corporation	United States	169	1941 – 1971	1 billion
Ribon	Shueisha	Japan	694	1955 – present	594 million (Note: See Ribon § Circulation.)
MAD Magazine	EC Comics, DC Comics	United States	557	1952 – present	430 million
CoroCoro Comic	Shogakukan	Japan	480	1977 – present	407 million (Note: See CoroCoro Comic § Circulation.)
Nakayoshi	Kodansha	Japan	756	1954 – present	400 million (Note: See Nakayoshi § Circulation.)
Monthly Shōnen Jump	Shueisha	Japan	317	1970 – 2007	215 million (Note: See Monthly Shōnen Jump § Circulation)
Action Comics	DC Comics	United States	1,000	1938 – present	188 million (Note: Action Comics sales – est. 187,508,831 copies: Up until 1989 – 170,851,312; 1993 – 2,203,000; 1996–2001 – 3,055,766; 2002–2006 – est. 2,400,000; 2007–2008 – est. 1,200,000; 2009 – 192,400; 2010 – 439,000; 2011 – 950,600; 2012 – 1,035,600; 2013 – 777,500; 2014 – 583,704; 2015 – 440,757; 2016 – 1,080,297; 2017 – 1,179,798; 2018 – 1,119,097)
Pilote	Dargaud	France	420	1959 – 1989	117 million

== See also ==
- List of best-selling manga
- List of Japanese manga magazines by circulation
- Weekly Shōnen Jump circulation figures
- List of best-selling books
- List of best-selling fiction authors
- List of highest-grossing media franchises
