= Demoniak (comics) =

Demoniak is a character of Italian comics born in the wake of the success of Diabolik and protagonist of three homonymous comic series published in Italy from 1965 to 1973. The character was created by Furio Arrasich and designed by Franco Verola and Edoardo Morricone. Although there are many similarities with Diabolik with whom he shares in addition to the physicality and the presence of a companion also called Eva, the story has a very different layout, with settings bordering on magic and parapsychology.
