= List of best-selling comics =

List of best selling comics can refer to:

- List of best-selling comic series
- List of best-selling manga
