= Zora the Vampire =

Zora la Vampira
- Directed by: Manetti Bros.
- Written by: Manetti Bros
- Produced by: Vittorio Cecchi Gori; Carlo Verdone
- Starring: Toni Bertorelli; Micaela Ramazzoti; Raffaele Vannoli; Carlo Verdone; Ivo Garrani
- Cinematography: Federico Schlatter
- Edited by: Federico Maneschi
- Music by: Skratch DJ Gruff; Squarta
- Release date: 2000
- Country: Italy
- Language: Italian

Zora the Vampire (Italian: Zora la Vampira) is a 2000 Italian horror-comedy film written and directed by Manetti Bros. It is loosely based on the eponymous comic character.

== Plot ==
In the year 2000, Dracula moves from Romania to Italy, having been inspired by Italian television shows and grown weary of drinking from Romanians. He is placed under suspicion of Italian police because all the other immigrants on the same boat as him were found dead and drained of blood. In the meantime, he meets a graffiti artist named Zora.

== Cast ==
- Micaela Ramazzotti: Zora
- Toni Bertorelli: Dracula
- Raffaele Vannoli: Servant of Dracula
- Carlo Verdone: Police commissioner Lombardi
- Ivo Garrani: The Priest
- Chef Ragoo: Zombi
- Selen: Vampira
- G Max: Lama
- Tormento: Cianuro
- Valerio Mastandrea: Nicola Speranza
- Sandro Ghiani: Cuccureddu

== See also ==
- Films about immigration to Italy
