= Io sono Mia =

- Film poster
- Directed by: Riccardo Donna
- Starring: Serena Rossi; Maurizio Lastrico; Lucia Mascino; Dajana Roncione; Corrado Invernizzi; Edoardo Pesce
- Release date: 13 February 2019
- Running time: 100 minutes
- Country: Italy
- Language: Italian

Io sono Mia ("I am Mia" in Italian, but also "I am Mine") is a 2019 Italian biographical musical drama film directed by Riccardo Donna. The film narrates the life of Mia Martini, including her artistic career, her entourage, her sister Loredana, the managers she knew, and her tumultuous relationships with their parents.

== Plot ==
The film begins in 1989 in Sanremo, with a flashback from the 1970s. Some episodes from her childhood (when her father hits her because she wants to sing and not to study), her artistic career, and family, are spoken during an interview granted to a journalist a few hours before singing at the Festival of 1989.

In the 1970s, Mia participated in the Festivalbar, winning the competition twice, in 1972 and 1973. Then it comes a dramatic period of slander launched in the late 1970s by a producer with whom she refused to work with and who accuses Mia of bringing bad luck. Mia then enters into a troubled love relationship with the Milanese photographer Andrea (inspired by Ivano Fossati, who did not want to participate in the film) with whom she falls in love with. She has a relationship with him for ten years. The film also evokes the character of the original Anthony who is inspired by Renato Zero, who also did not want to be mentioned in the movie, just like Fossati.

== Cast ==
- Serena Rossi as Mia Martini
- Maurizio Lastrico as Andrea
- Lucia Mascino as Sandra Neri
- Dajana Roncione as Loredana Bertè
- Antonio Gerardi as Alberigo Crocetta
- Nina Torresi as Alba Calia
- Daniele Mariani as Anthony
- Francesca Turrin as Mia's manager
- Fabrizio Coniglio as Roberto Galanti
- Gioia Spaziani as Maria Salvina Dato
- Duccio Camerini as Giuseppe Radames Bertè
- Simone Gandolfo as chiefredactor
- Corrado Invernizzi as Charles Aznavour
- Edoardo Pesce as Franco Califano
- Mauro Serio as medical doctor

== Awards ==
- Special Nastro d'Argento to Serena Rossi
