= Diabolik (TV series) =

Animated television series

- Also known as: Diabolik: Track of the Panther; Saban's Diabolik
- Genre: Action; Adventure; Police drama Superhero
- Based on: Diabolik by Angela and Luciana Giussani
- Written by: Jean Cheville; Florence Sandis
- Directed by: Charles Corton; Jean-Luc Ayak; Thierry Coudert
- Composers: Haim Saban; Shuki Levy; (as Michel Dax)
- Countries of origin: United States; France; Italy
- Original languages: English; French; Italian
- No. of seasons: 1
- No. of episodes: 40

Production
- Executive producers: Vincent Chalvon-Demersay; Jacqueline Tordjman
- Producer: Will Meugniot
- Editor: Stéphane Berry
- Running time: 24 minutes
- Production companies: Saban Entertainment; Saban International Paris; Mediaset

Original release
- Network: Fox Kids (Europe); Italia 1 (Italy); M6 (France)
- Release: May 5, 1999 – January 1, 2001

Diabolik (also known as Saban's Diabolik and Diabolik: Track of the Panther; French: Diabolik: Sur les Traces de la Panthère, lit. "Diabolik: In the Footsteps of the Panther") is an animated television series based on the Italian comic book series of the same name by Angela and Luciana Giussani. Developed by Charles Corton and written by Jean Cheville and Florence Sandis, the series was an international co-production between Saban Entertainment, Saban International Paris, M6 Métropole Télévision and Mediaset, with Asiatic animation services by Ashi Productions and Saerom Animation.

Production on the show began in 1997. It premiered in France on M6 on May 5, 1999, and was broadcast on Fox Kids across Europe, Latin America, and in Australia, running for 40 episodes. Ownership of the series passed to Disney in 2001 when the company acquired Fox Kids Worldwide, which also includes Saban Entertainment. Although it was co-produced in the United States, it never aired in that country.

The series focuses on master thief Diabolik and his woman companion Eva, as they fight the criminal organisation Brotherhood and its leader Dane, while evading Inspector Ginko. The series differs considerably from the darker-toned comic, making it more suitable for a young audience; the main differences include the rejuvenation of Diabolik and Eva Kant, the introduction of new characters (such as the main antagonist Dane), the replacement of Diabolik's Jaguar E-Type with a fictional modern car, the absence of murders by the title character, and the setting in the real world rather than fictional locations.

== Plot ==
Diabolik is a master thief with a deep knowledge in many scientific fields, including chemistry, mechanics, and computing. He has a set of lifelike masks which he uses to fool his opponents, assuming every identity at will.

As a foundling baby, Diabolik is discovered on a boat by King, the leader of the criminal organisation known as the Brotherhood, who welcomes him into his home like a son. Dane, King's legitimate son, does not accept Diabolik as a brother. Diabolik is raised as an orphan on the Brotherhood's secret island hideout, where he learns all his criminal skills.

Years later, Dane, jealous of Diabolik, frames him for a murder he did not commit. The victim is the father of Diabolik's future partner Eva Kant. Diabolik is imprisoned for the crime. Five years later, after King's death, Dane becomes the leader of the Brotherhood and organises Diabolik's prison escape with the intent of assassinating him.

Diabolik survives the assassination attempt and swears to destroy Dane and the Brotherhood. Together with Eva, who also has a personal vendetta against them, Diabolik manages to make life miserable for his brother and the organisation, while being pursued by Inspector Ginko.

== Characters ==
Character	French actor	Italian actor	English actor
Diabolik	Pierre-François Pistorio Donald Reignoux (Young)	Claudio Moneta; Simone D'Andrea (Young)	Stephen Bogeart
Eva Kant	Blanche Ravalec	Sonia Mazza	Megan Fahlenbock
Dane	Bernard Woringer Paolo Domingo (Young)	Marco Balzarotti; Patrizio Prata (Young)	Wayne Best
Ginko	Thierry Buisson	Marco Balbi	Graham Haley
Graffam	Albert Augier	Enzo Tarascio	Denis Akiyama
King	Michel Le Royer		Gary Krawford
Naomi	Sylvie Ferrari	Elda Olivieri	Julie Lemieux
Micky	Clara Borras		Janet Laine-Green
Banderas	Patrick Osmond	Diego Sabre	Diego Matamoros
Ranavalona	Marie-Christine Darah		Alison Sealy-Smith
Daggett	François Leccia	Gianluca Iacono	Jesse Collins
Leonov	Thierry Mercier	Oliviero Corbetta	Dan Chameroy
Coren	Marc Bretionnière		Michael Lamport
Yuko			Jane Luk

== Production ==
The series is based on the Italian comic book series of the same name by Angela and Luciana Giussani, although it is significantly different from the source material, as it is more suitable for a young audience. It was developed by Charles Corton and written by Jean Cheville and Florence Sandis, and produced by the French studios Saban International Paris and M6 Métropole Télévision, the American Saban Entertainment, and the Italian Mediaset, with Asiatic animation services by Ashi Productions and Saerom Animation. The production started in 1997. Mario Gomboli (it), Italian script writer and editor of the original comics and artistic consultant of the series, stated: "In 1997, Saban International wanted to project cartoons, I proposed my children's books but they wanted something more adventurous, and so I told them about Diabolik." Disney owns the rights of the series as an exclusive property through BVS Entertainment, (the series itself, copyrights, episodes, plot, merchandising/distribution rights, "TRACK OF THE PANTHER" trademark/label, recurring characters and other fictional/commercial elements or materials exclusively created for the animated TV show and not related with comics) while Astorina S.r.l holding the rights of the original Diabolik IP, franchise, trademark and its original characters like Diabolik, Eva, Ginko and King as an underlying property.

According to an interview with a crew member, production of the series was particularly difficult due to the tension between American Saturday-morning cartoon expectations compared to the Italian origins of the character, with representatives from Italy mounting "staunch resistance" against attempts to move the series in that direction. This resulted in a much more extensive pre-production process, lasting for a year as opposed to two weeks for most animated series. In the end, a "workable format" seemed to be found, which balanced expounding on the character's darker backstory with his reformed nature in the present day of the series. The source of the information remained critical of the series, claiming it later "watered down" the concept making it less exciting, and added that Fox even considered cutting the series down to just 13 episodes in an effort to make it more action-oriented.

Larry Brody, a creative consultant on the series, revealed more details:

"The problems with Diabolik were much more complex than your 'source' indicated," Brody told us. "First, someone who had never done animation before and had no real affinity for comics was hired to develop/supervise the series (not me; I replaced him later). Then, the network exec who had championed the show was kicked off it in a power struggle. And then there was the fact that there were 5 partners, French, Italian (2), American, and Japanese, all of whom had contracts giving them 'final approval' of each episode."

The end result of all this confusion was "a series that was too childish for Italy and Fox Family, too adult for France and Fox Kids, and too expensive for Japan," Brody told us. "Yet the show was a certified hit in France anyway, and would have been a moneymaker if the toys had ever come out."

The failure to bring the toys to market is another complicated story, Brody said.

About the series' development and broadcast, Mario Gomboli also said:

The project started well, but when Saban was bought by Fox Kids the production moved [from France] to Los Angeles, and the first problems arose. The Americans didn't want Diabolik and Eva to be, I won't say lovers, but simply to live together. One guy wanted them to be brother and sister to justify unmarried people living under the same roof. We argued in a couple of situations. Especially on the use of daggers since the Toronto regulations say that weapons cannot be used on human beings. So Diabolik could only use daggers to puncture tires, blow out a light bulb or cut a rope, but never against anyone. In the end it was never distributed in the US because, last but not least, Disney bought Fox Kids and they believed that Diabolik was a name that reminded people of Satanism, and therefore not suitable for kids.

== Release ==
=== Broadcast ===
The series premiered in Europe on Fox Kids on May 5, 1999, and lasted for 40 episodes before ending on January 1, 2001; it also aired on M6 in France and on Italia 1 in Italy. The English dub of the series was initially set to air on Fox Family Channel in the United States in 2000, but was cancelled before being aired, although the series was broadcast in Australia.

=== Home media ===
As with many other Saban Entertainment series, the only major English-language DVD release is by Czech distributor North Video, featuring both Czech and English audio and original video (with English-language text) in the original production order. All 40 episodes were released on 12 volumes, from May 10 to August 2, 2010.

In France, TF1 released exactly half of the series on DVD on February 22, 2007 exclusively in French, including on-screen text and a unique opening sequence. Despite the show's noted popularity in France, the second half has not been released.

In Italy, the complete series was released on December 2, 2020, with Italian audio only.

== Episodes ==
No.	Title	Original release date
1	"For Old Times Sake"	5 May 1999 (France) 7 September 2000 (Italy)
Diabolik goes to Paris to meet his former mentor Rana and save her from a terminal illness. The serum to cure her is found in an ancient Egyptian tomb. But Rana's disease is actually just a lie to force him to steal the gold kept in the sarcophagus.
2	"Under the North Pole"	9 September 2000 (Italy)
Diabolik and Eva Kant help their former partner Ivan Fedorski recover a deadly Russian particle gun from Leonov's submarine.
3	"Chinese Puzzle Box"	10 September 2000 (Italy)
The Chinese Golden Triad teams up with Dane to track down a puzzle box that leads to an immense hidden treasure. Diabolik and Eva steal the box, replacing it with an exact replica and then making sure the Triad can track it down. Discovered that it is a fake, the members of the Triad are convinced that all this is the work of Dane.
4	"Sea of Gold"	16 September 2000
Evil arms dealer Mickey is threatening to bomb twelve oil fields, following Dane's orders, but she has other plans in mind to make more profit from this operation. Diabolik and Eva try to frame Mickey by recording her confession of her in which she admits she wants to rip Dane after placing a bomb on the bottom of the sea.
5	"King's Legacy"	17 September 2000
Diabolik is hired by Janice Keegan to save her alleged daughter who has been kidnapped by Dane. The child is in fact the "key" to open a safe deposit box of a Swiss bank in which King deposited his entire inheritance. After the rescue, however, Diabolik discovers that the girl is not Keegan's daughter. The woman only intends to use her genetic code to take over the bank account.
6	"Honor Student"	23 September 2000
At the prestigious Hillton Academy, promising young student Philip is recruited by the Brotherhood of Dane to steal precious gems from the London Tower. Diabolik discovers that the school is just a cover used by Dane to train and recruit new criminals, and manages to save Philip from corruption while Eva has the boy's teacher blame the theft of the jewelry.
7	"Track of the Panther"	24 September 2000
While fleeing an ambush by Dane and his collaborators, Diabolik must hide in order not to be found and remembers the year before, in Paris, he met and recruited his partner Eva Kant to recover an heirloom belonging to the woman's family, stolen by Dane. It was the beginning of a long and fruitful collaboration between the two thieves.
8	"Panther Uncaged"	30 September 2000
Diabolik remembers his childhood, when, as a baby, he was found abandoned on a boat by King, the leader of the criminal organisation Brotherhood. He was welcomed into King's home like a son, but Dane, King's legitimate son, never accepted him as a brother. Years later, Dane managed to get Diabolik arrested on charges of aggravated theft. Having escaped from prison and simulated his death, Diabolik has since tried in every way to take revenge on his half-brother by destroying the Brotherhood.
9	"The Mole"	1 October 2000
Inspector Ginko is accused of numerous crimes and locked up in prison. Eva and Diabolik investigate the mysterious events and discover that Ginko was framed by someone in internal affairs to prevent a hacking attempt related to the development of a program containing all the secret data of Interpol, and this someone is involved with Dane and the Brotherhood.
10	"A Sporting Chance"	7 October 2000
Diabolik and Eva must eradicate a shady criminal plot hatched by Mickey to get a fortune by blackmailing a young Brazilian soccer champion, forcing him to lose his team. With a series of cunning tricks, Diabolik and Eva thus save the champion's family that had been kidnapped.
11	"Target: Diabolik"	8 October 2000
Wolf, a ruthless killer in Dane's pay, starts a hunt for Diabolik to carry out his personal revenge against him. The killer, however, was deceived by Dane, who made him believe that it was Diabolik who was responsible for the accident that left him with a disfigured face. But Diabolik is innocent: it was Dane who caused the accident in the factory where Wolf worked.
12	"Hot Threads"	14 October 2000
Diabolik and Eva are in Italy to follow a group of counterfeiters led by Danton, and discover that a dress auctioned at a fashion show is woven with money threads. Diabolik and Eva set a trap to attract Danton's attention, unmask him and have him arrested by Inspector Ginko.
13	"Tokyo Conspiracy"	15 October 2000
Akira Okada and his father Takashi have a family dilemma: the boy does not intend to succeed his father at the head of the Tokyo mafia clans. Diabolik and Eva Kant arrive in Japan and discover that Dagget is the cause of the continuing feuds between the crime families for the conquest of Tokyo, but they guarantee that his plan will go to waste.
14	"Rust in Peace"	21 October 2000
Diabolik and Eva try to stop Mickey, who wants to use a substance invented by M.L. Tory that makes things rust for a terrorist attack.
15	"Triple Play"	22 October 2000
Hoping to frame Diabolik and Eva, Dane orders Wolf to carry out three separate great thefts of three priceless treasures of humanity. Diabolik solves this problem by including Inspector Ginko in the equation and fixing the artifacts in one place, thus allowing him and Eva to step in and thwart Dane's umpteenth plan to damage the Brotherhood.
16	"Merchant of Menace"	28 October 2000
Diabolik and Eva chase James Packard and Ben Darris who stole the secret QSB armored car project. Once Diabolik takes control of the QSB, he mows down Ben Darris' house and crashes the armoured vehicle off a cliff to prevent it from being used by the Brotherhood for their criminal projects.
17	"Question of Survival"	29 October 2000
Diabolik finds himself stuck in a jungle with little equipment, chased by Ben Darris' men, until he is able to meet up with Eva to fend off Dane's pirates from the Miramar Cruise, a ship carrying the relics of an ancient Mayan treasure that the Brotherhood intends to steal.
18	"Her Father's Daughter"	4 November 2000
Eva pursues a man who she believes to be her father, that has long since disappeared due to Dane's machinations. While searching for the register that belonged to King, Diabolik discovers that Eva's father is just an impostor sent by Dane to lure her into a trap.
19	"Memories"	5 November 2000
Following an accident, Diabolik beats his head and starts to suffer from partial amnesia, unable to remember the events of the last eight years. Believing that King is still alive and that he is still part of the organization, Diabolik recalls eight years ago and decides to steal some jewels just like he was doing on the last day he remembers. Dane finds out what happened to his brother and deceives him, followed by Eva, who is trying to help her partner.
20	"Lost City"	11 November 2000
Diabolik blends in with Ben Darris' expedition to found the Inca treasure of Mesocotyl.
21	"Eye of Storm"	12 November 2000
Rana and Wolf use a machine that creates an artificial hurricane to rob a Caribbean bank undisturbed. Diabolik intervenes to stop them.
22	"Lights! Camera! Diabolik!"	18 November 2000
Diabolik and Eva uncover plans by Mickey to reverse engineer their mask-making technique and use it to steal millions worth of jewels.
23	"Hide and Seek"	19 November 2000
Diabolik tries to steal the lost treasure of an emperor, until his brother Dane intervenes.
24	"Ultimate Security"	25 November 2000
Diabolik must prevent Dagget from gaining control of a key military satellite.
25	"Crowning Glory"	26 November 2000
Diabolik tries to recover some crown jewels, stolen by Rana's henchmen
26	"The Kindness of Strangers"	27 November 2000
A Russian doctor ends up in danger when she accidentally finds a device from the organisation stolen by Diabolik
27	"Redline: Diabolik"	28 November 2000
While Diabolik is engaged in a robbery to get some photos with which the Brotherhood is blackmailing Leonov, he begins to remember with Eva an old robbery in which he lost his special car. Diabolik impersonated an Italian mechanic, Osvaldo Ferraresi, to rebuild the car and recover it from Dane's hands
28	"The Wrong Side of the Tracks"	28 November 2000
Diabolik tries to steal Napoleon's diary, transported on a train that crosses the Channel Tunnel.
29	"Master Plan"	3 December 2000
Diabolik faces a virtual intelligence that processes perfect thefts
30	"Partners"	16 December 2000
Diabolik steps into action to prevent Dane from stealing an experimental serum from a military base
31	"The Thief who stole Tomorrow"	23 December 2000
Diabolik makes Banderas believe that he has been in a coma for twenty years, thus letting his criminal plans be revealed.
32	"The Detective's Obsession"	24 December 2000
Ginko manages to arrest Eva, and Diabolik devises a plan to save her
33	"Strange Alliance"	30 December 2000
Diabolik and Ginko are infected with a deadly virus, and Eva sets out to find a cure to save them.
34	"Daggers And Swords"	31 December 2000
Diabolik sets out in search of the legendary Durandal sword.
35	"Rainbow Warriors"	13 January 2001
Diabolik intervenes in a race to decide the new chief of an Indian tribe named Ogala.
36	"From the Depths"	14 January 2001
Diabolik and Eva devise a plan to recover an Inca statuette from a sunken vessel.
37	"Kid's Stuff"	20 January 2001
Sophie, a little girl, discovers Diabolik's hiding place and is kidnapped by Dane's men, who want the information. Diabolik goes to rescue her.
38	"Future Imperfect"	27 January 2001
Dane uses a clairvoyant to uncover Diabolik's plans, but the thief uses it to his advantage
39	"Final Justice: Part 1"	27 January 2001
Diabolik decides to launch the final attack on Dane. With Eva's help, he tries to steal the organisation's vault keys from its six bosses. Diabolik searches for King's Ledger, who is locked in a high-security safe that requires five keys and security codes, while an investigation against Dane begins.
40	"Final Justice: Part 2"	28 January 2001
Diabolik and Eva steal the five security keys and replace them with duplicates, turning the Brotherhood leaders against Dane. Diabolik confronts Dane and helps Inspector Ginko to obtain King's Ledger. Dane and his men are eventually arrested by Ginko thanks to Diabolik, exposing the Brotherhood once and for all.
