= Diabolik =

Fictional character

- Cover of Diabolik - Momenti disperati ("Diabolik - Desperate moments"), featuring the title character

Publication information
- Publisher: Astorina
- First appearance: 1962
- Created by: Angela and Luciana Giussani

In-story information
- Full name: Unknown
- Partnerships: Eva Kant
- Abilities: Genius-level intellect; Criminal mastermind; Expert strategist and tactician; Master martial artist, hand-to-hand combatant, marksman, swordsman, acrobat, and pilot; Proficient scientist; Master assassin

Diabolik (Italian: [djaˈbɔːlik, djaboˈlik]) is an Italian comic series created by the Giussani sisters.

One of the most popular series in the history of Italian comics, Diabolik was created in 1962 and consists of more than 900 volumes, and has led to the birth of the fumetti neri comic subgenre. The series is named after its protagonist, an anti-heroic thief, inspired by several previous pulp fiction characters from Italy and other countries. Its stories consist of monthly black-and-white, digest-sized volumes.

The series takes place in the fictional town Clerville and stars the titular Diabolik, initially represented as a ruthless and cruel thief who does not hesitate to murder anyone in order to accomplish his deeds, aided by his partner and lover Eva Kant. Over time, the character evolved his personality, developing healthy roots and ethical principles such as honor, the sense of friendship and gratitude, and respect for noble souls. He focused on robbing and killing other criminals. Throughout his adventures, he is pursued mainly by the Inspector Ginko.

The series sold more than 150 million copies worldwide, becoming one of the best-known and best-selling comics series from Europe. Live-action film adaptations were made: Danger: Diabolik (1968) and a film trilogy consisting of Diabolik (2021), Diabolik: Ginko Attacks! (2022) and Diabolik: Who Are You? (2023). Its success has also inspired a radio show, an animated television series, video games, novels, and countless parodies.

== Creation and development ==
The idea for the character of Diabolik was born from seeing commuters every day. Co-creator Angela Giussani, who lived near Milano Cadorna railway station, thought of making comics in a format designed for travelling and carrying in one's pocket. To better understand the tastes of her potential readers, Angela made a survey of the market, from which she concluded that many commuters read mystery novels. Another version of the story claims that the very idea came from her finding a Fantômas novel abandoned in a train. Thus, was born the "Diabolik format" (a small 12 x 17 cm (7 in) book), which proved popular with other publications in the same genre. The pocketbook format contributed, in fact, to the success of the character.

== Plot ==
Diabolik is a ruthless master thief. He typically steals from criminals (and has no issue with killing them if need be, but rarely, if ever, kills the innocent or the police), and has a set of lifelike masks which he uses to fool his opponents, assuming every identity at will. He seems to have a deep knowledge in many scientific fields, including chemistry, mechanics, and computers. In his first appearances, Diabolik was a more straightforward villain who did not hesitate to murder anyone in order to accomplish his deeds. He was later given a more "Robin Hood"-like persona and was shown stealing essentially from criminals, in order to soften the series’ violence and amorality.

He was raised as an orphan on a secret island hideout of a criminal combine, where he learned all his criminal skills, including developing his special masks, before killing the head of the combine. Diabolik's true name had never been revealed in the series, and he does not know it himself. Diabolik took his name from a dangerous black panther that the head of the combine killed on the secret island. From issue #3 of the series, Diabolik is aided by his "moll", Eva Kant, who has gained an increasing role as his partner and lover.

Diabolik always drives a black 1961 Jaguar E-type. Graphically inspired by the actor Robert Taylor, he usually wears a skintight black body suit that leaves only his eyes and eyebrows (very distinctive ones) exposed when going "into action". Diabolik does not use firearms: his main weapons are the daggers he throws with uncanny ability, as well as a small dart gun with knockout darts. Eva drives a white Jaguar, and unusually goes into action wearing a heavy sweater and pants, no mask and no revealing clothing. The stories are set in a fictional town, Clerville, loosely inspired by Geneva, Switzerland.

Diabolik's main opponent is Inspector Ginko, known only by his surname, a fierce and incorruptible police officer who is almost always thwarted by astute tricks devised by Diabolik. The only other recurring character is the noblewoman Altea, Ginko's fiancée.

== Characters ==
Cover of Ginko alleato a sorpresa ("Ginko: A Surprising Ally"), featuring Diabolik and Inspector Ginko.

Main characters

- Diabolik - a legendary thief who follows an ancient code of conduct.
- Eva Kant - Diabolik's lover and accomplice, she is a skilled and ruthless criminal in her own right. Their relationship begins as adversarial, then he becomes her lover. Later in the series she is reimagined as Diabolik's partner and equal.
- Inspector Ginko - a determined and incorruptible Clerville police detective who attempts, unsuccessfully, to capture Diabolik on numerous occasions.

Secondary characters

- Altea - a titled heiress and Ginko's lover.
- King - the leader of a powerful criminal organization, he became Diabolik's foster father and trains him in the skills he will need as a criminal. King eventually betrays Diabolik and plans to murder him, but the infallible criminal kills him first.
- Elisabeth "Tina" Gay - a nurse who becomes Diabolik's first love after meeting him in the hospital. When she discovers his true nature, she betrays him to the police. Eventually, Diabolik drives her mad and Tina is confined to an asylum.
- Dr. Alberto Floriani - a famous neuropsychiatrist who treats Elizabeth Gay during her stay in the asylum and eventually marries her. Part of Diabolik's assault on Elizabeth's sanity involves him visiting her in the hospital, disguised as Albert.
- Bettina - a girl who should become familiar with Diabolik and Eva, until she becomes like a daughter.
- Gustavo Garian - son of a wealthy family, which has been decimated by Diabolik; he sought revenge on several occasions.

== Clerville ==
Many of the Diabolik stories are set in the fictional city of Clerville, which is located in a state also named Clerville. However, in the first issues of the series, Diabolik carried out his heists in Marseille, but the authors decided to invent a new city, so as to avoid having to do continual documentation on the city.

It is clear that Clerville is in Europe, since in 2002, it adopted the Euro as its currency; the city's previous currency had never been named, but had the same value as the Italian lira.

The state of Clerville also includes other cities, such as Ghenf (styled after the German name for Geneva: Genf), the second most important city in the state, which is situated on the sea (Clerville, the city, is located in the interior and is crossed by a river).

== Equipment ==
Diabolik uses a variety of gadgets and equipment which he uses as an aid in his robberies, to wiretap conversations and variety of weaponry.

=== Suit ===
The trademark of Diabolik is his black suit, which completely covers his body except for his eyes, eyebrows, and black running shoes. He uses it as an aid in his burglaries or robberies and to protect his identity. He has variety of gadgets and weapons stashed under it. His outfit can be used as a diving suit since it can keep him warm while underwater, and it's also fireproof. However, it cannot protect him from lethal harm (bullets and knives), but he relies on his fighting skills to deal with those.

=== Drugs ===
Diabolik and Eva Kant use a variety of drugs to stun, kill, or force their enemies into submission. They mostly use Pentothal as a truth serum to force the victims into obeying and aiding the two in their burglaries or robberies. They also use scopolamine to cause amnesia and a variety of sedatives to stun their enemies. They also use cyanide to kill their enemies during a quick getaway, but mostly for their targets.

=== Weapons and gadgets ===
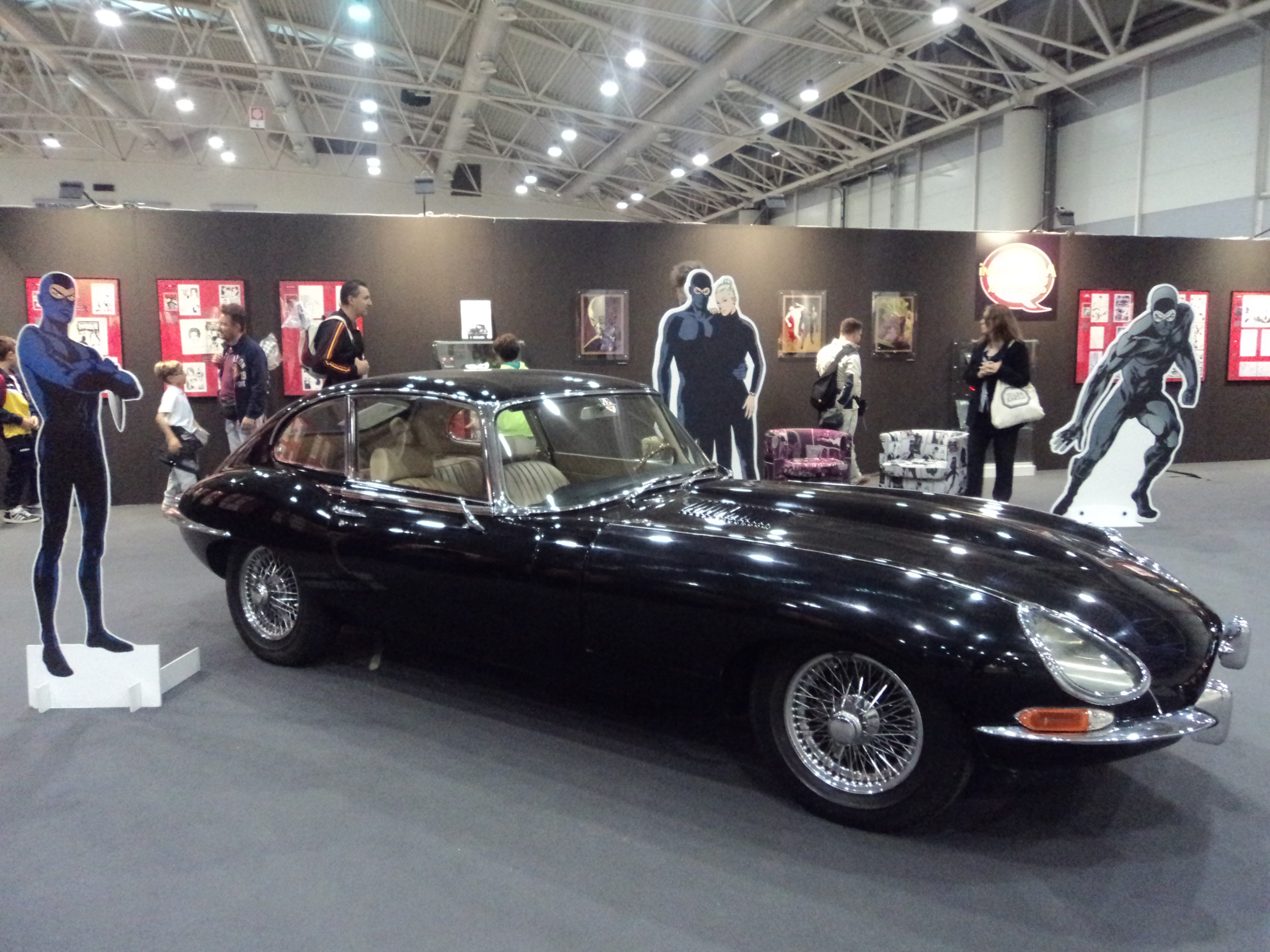
A Jaguar E-Type, Diabolik's car, at the Romics 2015

Diabolik uses a variety of weapons and gadgets to stun or kill his enemies. He neither owns nor uses firearms, preferring stealth. He uses stun gas, if necessary, but avoids it when he can. He also uses daggers to kill his enemies in seconds. He has a variety of gadgets for quick usage, some of them as an aid in his robbery. Diabolik carries various radio-controlled equipment, that trigger specific objects into helping him, placed over Clerville (for example: traffic lights to create green waves, sprinklers that spray black paint onto incoming police cars, train ramps). He once inserted a device in Ginko's car to activate his airbag during a police pursuit. He has a variety of weapons inside his signature black Jaguar E-Type to aid him, such as Gatling guns or heat-seeking missiles. He uses wiretaps and mini cameras to spy on others, and he communicates with Eva via a walkie-talkie hidden in his watch.

=== Masks ===
Another of Diabolik's trademarks is his photorealistic masks of a specially designed plastic that he uses to impersonate his victims or enemies, and he has used a multitude of them to help him. Diabolik uses the masks in almost every burglary he attempts, and Eva sometimes uses them while directly acting with him. He has used the masks to impersonate people that are of great use to him, and sometimes only to hide his looks. Diabolik and Eva also use them while going somewhere out in public to avoid being recognized (they used false looks once while going out to dinner).

== Publication ==
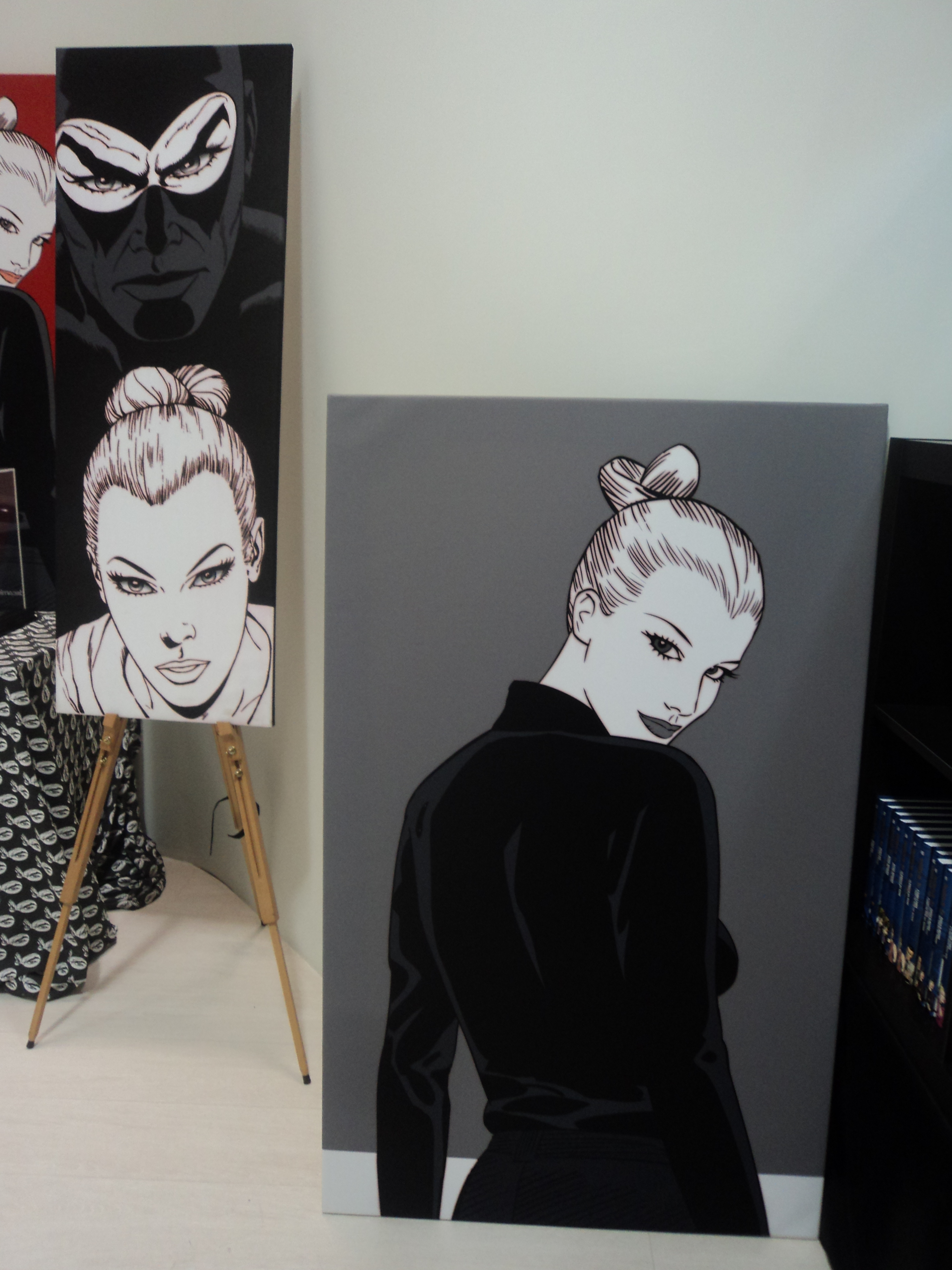
Drawings of Eva Kant and Diabolik from the comics

Diabolik was published as a succession of series, most of them one year long. The Giussani sisters wrote many of the stories until the 1980s, passing them gradually to Patricia Martinelli’s - and others' - hands. The main bulk of the artwork is executed by Sergio Zaniboni, who has been drawing Diabolik since 1969 (lately sharing the role with Giorgio Montorio) until his death. Other artists working on the series include Brenno Fiumali, Franco Paludetti, Enzo Facciolo and Lino Jeva.

=== Comic series ===
Prima Serie, 1962-1964. Issues #1-24.
The first issue, Il Re del Terrore (in English: "The King of Terror"), appeared in print on 1 November 1962. This was issue #1 of the first series. The next issue appeared on 1 February 1963, followed by monthly issues up to issue #24 in December 1964.
Seconda Serie, 1965. Issues #25-50.
Publication switched to one issue every two weeks, with each series being one year and 26 issues long.
Anno V, 1966. Issues #51-76.
The series began to be named for the year of publication since the first issue.
Anno XII-XVI, 1973-1977. Issues #233-351
The first 12 issues of Prima Serie started to be re-released, 2-4 a year, in place of regular issues. "Il Re del Terrore" was rereleased as Anno XII, No. 6
Anno XVII-XIX, 1978-1980.
24 issues a year, published twice a month.
Anno XX-XXV, 1981-1986.
14 issues a year: published monthly, plus an extra issue in July and August.
Anno XXVI-XXVII, 1987-1988.
12 issues a year, published monthly.
Anno XXVIII-XXXII, 1989-1993.
7 issues a year
Anno XXXIII, 1994. Issues #566-574
9 issues were published this year. Starting in July 1994, publication returned to once a month.
Anno XXXIV-LXII, 1995-2023 (ongoing)
12 issues a year, published monthly. In October 2013, the 800th issue was published.

Series	Year	Issues
Prima	1962-4	#1-24
Seconda	1965	#25-50
Anno V	1966	#51-76
Anno VI	1967	#77-102
Anno VII	1968	#103-128
Anno VIII	1969	#129-154
Anno IX	1970	#155-180
Anno X	1971	#181-206
Anno XI	1972	#207-232
Anno XII	1973	#233-256
Anno XIII	1974	#257-280
Anno XIV	1975	#281-304
Anno XV	1976	#305-327
Anno XVI	1977	#328-351
Anno XVII	1978	#352-374
Anno XVIII	1979	#375-398
Anno XIX	1980	#399-422
Anno XX	1981	#423-436
Anno XXI	1982	#437-450
Anno XXII	1983	#451-464
Anno XXIII	1984	#465-478

Series	Year	Issues
Anno XXIV	1985	#479-492
Anno XXV	1986	#493-506
Anno XXVI	1987	#507-518
Anno XXVII	1988	#519-530
Anno XXVIII	1989	#531-537
Anno XXIX	1990	#538-544
Anno XXX	1991	#545-551
Anno XXXI	1992	#552-558
Anno XXXII	1993	#559-565
Anno XXXIII	1994	#566-574
Anno XXXIV	1995	#575-586
Anno XXXV	1996	#587-598
Anno XXXVI	1997	#599-610
Anno XXXVII	1998	#611-622
Anno XXXVIII	1999	#623-634
Anno XXXIX	2000	#635-646
Anno XL	2001	#647-658
Anno XLI	2002	#659-670
Anno XLII	2003	#671-682
Anno XLIII	2004	#683-694
Anno XLIV	2005	#695-706

Series	Year	Issues
Anno XLV	2006	#707-718
Anno XLVI	2007	#719-730
Anno XLVII	2008	#731-742
Anno XLVIII	2009	#743-754
Anno XLIX	2010	#755-766
Anno L	2011	#767-778
Anno LI	2012	#779-790
Anno LII	2013	#791-802
Anno LIII	2014	#803-814
Anno LIV	2015	#815-826
Anno LV	2016	#827-838
Anno LVI	2017	#839-850
Anno LVII	2018	#851-862
Anno LVIII	2019	#863-874
Anno LIX	2020	#875-886
Anno LX	2021	#887-898
Anno LXI	2022	#899-910
Anno LXII	2023	#911-

=== Reprints and digests ===
==== United States ====
In 1986, Pacific Comics Club published 2 digest-size issues. Since 1997 a series of annual books with more complex stories has been released. In 2000, Scorpion started to publish digests, reaching 6 issues before stopping.

Some American reprints have appeared.

==== Diabolik in India ====
Diabolik was translated into Tamil and introduced to India in December 1987 by Prakash Publishers under their imprint Lion Comics. His first adventure was titled Danger Diabolik. Though the story and the character got tremendous response, for various reasons, this was the only story published until 2013.

In June 2013, Diabolik made his comeback via the same publisher, but this effort had more impact. It was launched in the Comic Con 2013 in Bengaluru with the storyline titled Kutra Thiru Vizha (A Carnival of Crime). Based on the positive response for the story arc and the style, in December 2013, Diabolik made his third appearance in Operation Tornado.

Lion Comics publishes these books in high standard digest format, priced at INR 40.

==== Other countries ====
Issues of the series were published in multiple countries, most notably in Spain, Germany, France, Greece, Finland, Croatia, Belarus, Netherlands, Turkey, Serbia, Hungary, Brazil and Kenya.

Diabolik was translated into Croatian on several occasions. First appearance was in Superstrip biblioteka #43 published by Vjesnik - 25 episodes were published (1968-1971). New episodes were published by Art Print - 1 episode in 1999, Slobodna Dalmacija - 18 episodes (2000-2002) and Ludens - 4 annuals (2007-2010), 4 episodes (2017-still in print).

A Serbian translation was launched by Maverick Kraljevo in 2002, with 2 episodes being published.

In Dutch 56 stories were published.

Dutch company Synti Groep has also digitally released Danish, Dutch, English, French, German, Portuguese, Serbo-Croatian, Spanish and Turkish translations of Diabolik comics, as well as all the original Italian comics; 223 volumes were digitally released in English.

== Adaptations ==
=== Films ===
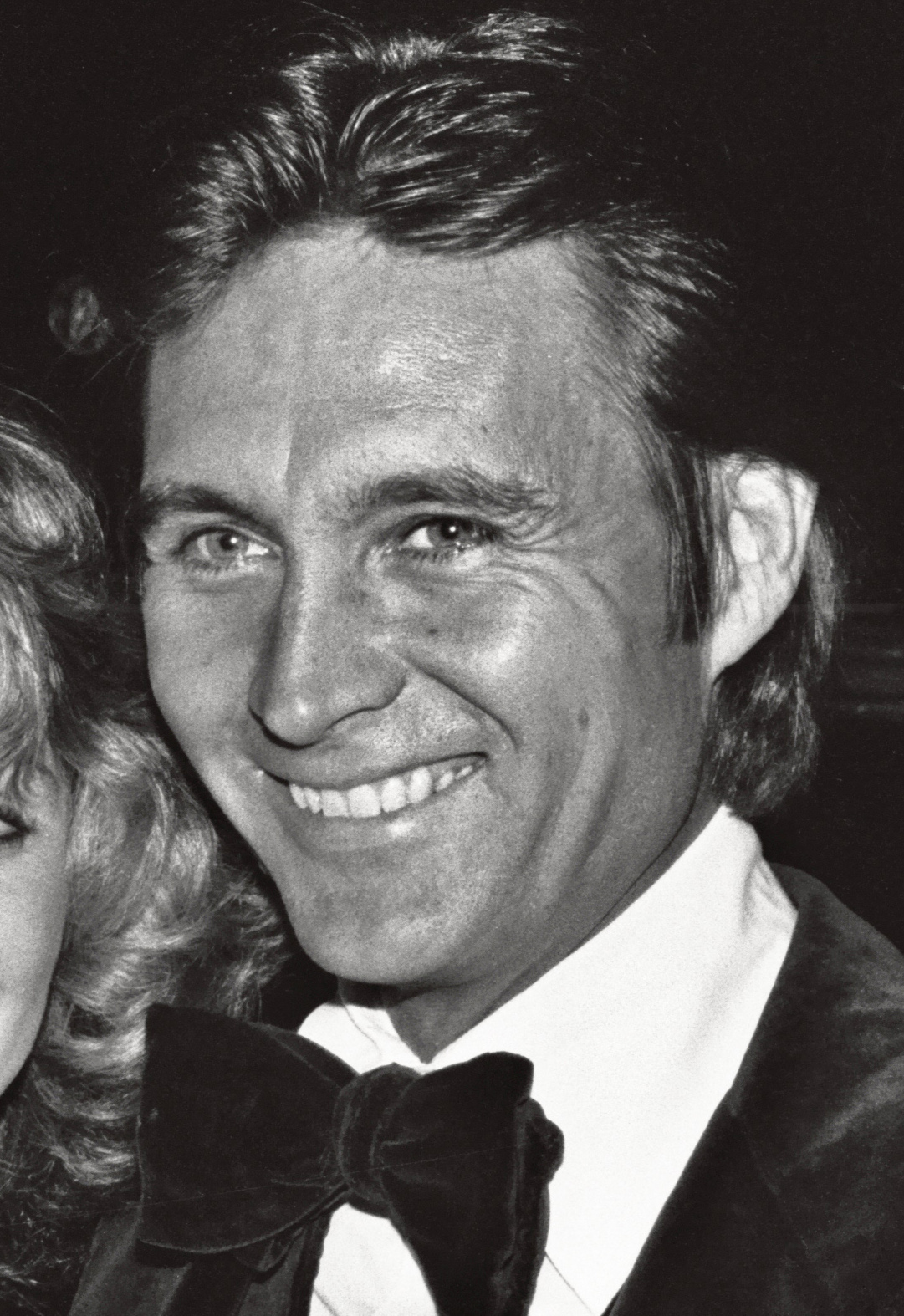
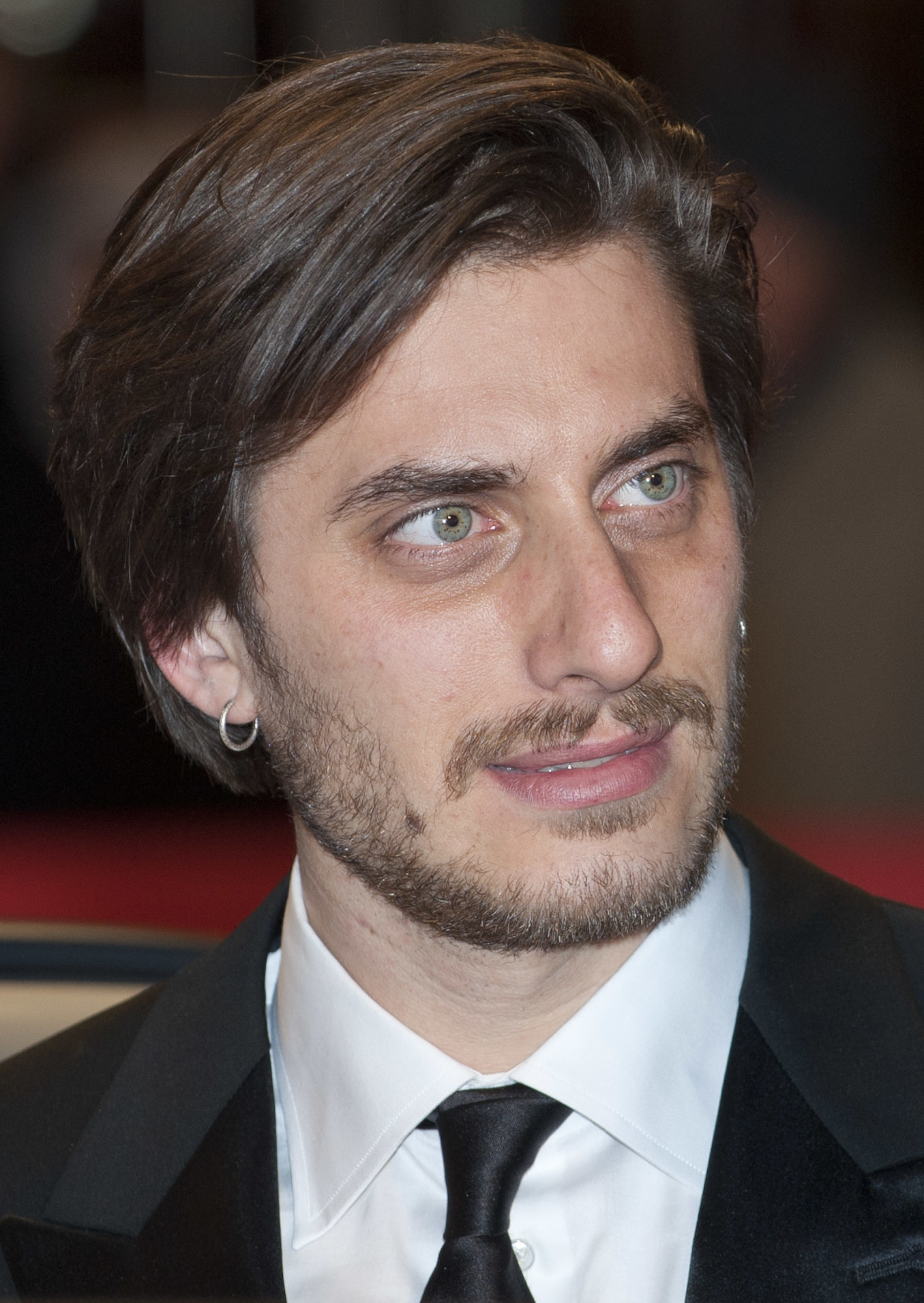
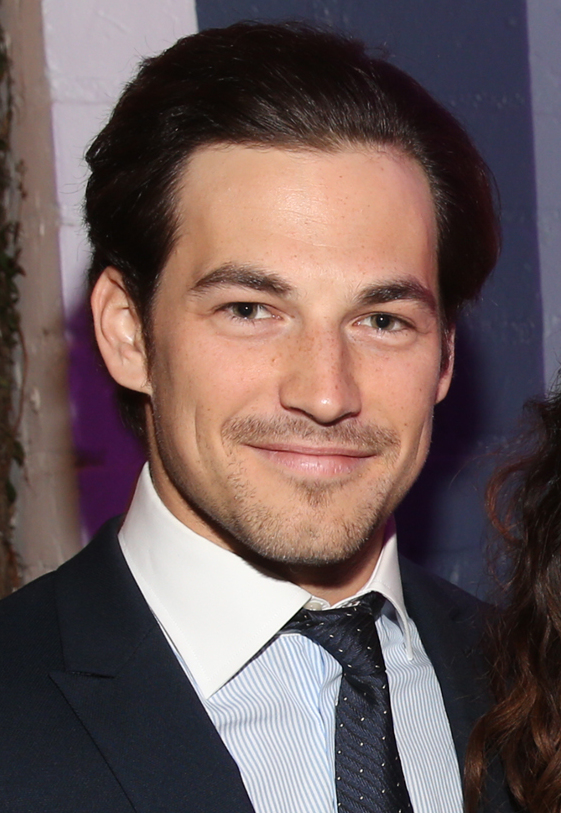
John Philip Law (left) portrayed Diabolik in the 1968 film Danger: Diabolik. The character was later played by Luca Marinelli (middle) in Diabolik (2021), and then by Giacomo Gianniotti (right) in the sequels Diabolik: Ginko Attacks! (2022) and Diabolik: Who Are You? (2023).
- Italian filmmaker Mario Bava adapted three Diabolik stories for a 1968 feature film, Danger: Diabolik, produced by Dino De Laurentiis and starring John Phillip Law as Diabolik, Marisa Mell as Eva, and Michel Piccoli as Ginko. The film was used in the final episode of the 10th season of the long-running television series, Mystery Science Theater 3000. Initially it received generally negative reviews from The New York Times and Variety, but with the re-evaluation of Bava's filmography in subsequent years, retrospective reception of the film has been more positive, with its visuals and the score by Ennio Morricone receiving praise. In studies of the film, critics and historians have focused on Bava's use of mise-en-scène to replicate the imagery and stylization of comic books, and the film's reflection of the socio-political upheavals of the 1960s in its characterization and narratology. The credibility of the onscreen chemistry shared between John Philip Law and Mell also received large praise. In 2008, it was chosen by Empire magazine as one of The 500 Greatest Movies of All Time.
- Diabolik sono io ("Diabolik is me"; 2019), a docudrama directed by Giancarlo Soldi about the comic and its first designer Angelo Zarcone. In addition to showing rare archive materials from the publishing house, the docu-film also seek a possible explanation of the mystery linked to Zarcone, who disappeared without leaving contact details after completing the tables of the first issue.
- A trilogy movie directed by Manetti Bros.:
  - Diabolik: a 2021 adaptation. It was announced in December 2018 by Rai Cinema president Paolo del Brocco; the Manetti Bros. directed and co-wrote the screenplay with Michelangelo La Neve and Gomboli. The cast includes Luca Marinelli as Diabolik, Miriam Leone as Eva, Valerio Mastandrea as Ginko, and Serena Rossi, Alessandro Roja and Claudia Gerini. The film was originally scheduled to be released on 31 December 2020, and then postponed to 16 December 2021 due to the COVID-19 pandemic in Italy.
  - Diabolik: Ginko Attacks! (Diabolik - Ginko all'attacco!): scheduled to be released on 17 November 2022, starring Giacomo Gianniotti instead of Marinelli.
  - A third movie titled Diabolik: Who Are You? (Diabolik - Chi sei?) was released on 30 November 2023.

=== Animated series ===
On 5 May 1999, an animated series, animated by Ashi Productions and produced by Saban Entertainment and Saban International Paris, premiered in Europe and Latin America on Fox Kids, and lasted for 40 episodes before ending on 1 January 2001. The series featured Diabolik and his companion Eva, as they fought and gradually exposed the Brotherhood and Dane, while evading Inspector Ginko. It was directed by Jean Luc Ayach with Paul Diamond and Larry Brody as head writers. Ownership of the series passed to Disney in 2001 when Disney acquired Fox Kids Worldwide, which also includes Saban Entertainment. Although it was co-produced in the U.S., it never aired there in that country. Disney owns the rights of the series as an exclusive property through BVS Entertainment, (the series itself, copyrights, episodes, plot, merchandising/distribution rights, "TRACK OF THE PANTHER" trademark/label, recurring characters and other fictional/commercial elements or materials exclusively created for the animated TV show and not related with comics) with Astorina S.r.l holding the rights of the original Diabolik IP, franchise, trademark and its original characters like Diabolik, Eva, Ginko and King as an underlying property.

=== Live-action TV series ===
In 2012, Sky TV in conjunction with Sky France and Sky Italy, started work on a TV version of Diabolik. A teaser trailer was made for the production, but by 2015 the production had not been released and there was no further information released by the studio.

=== Video games ===
A total of 12 Diabolik games were developed and released in 1993 by Simulmondo for the Commodore 64 and Amiga. The games were in Italian and were made specifically for the Italian domestic market, seeing only limited distribution elsewhere.

Diabolik: The Original Sin is a 2009 video game developed by Artematica and published by Black Bean Games for Wii, PlayStation Portable, Microsoft Windows, Nintendo DS, and PlayStation 2 systems.

== Influence ==
The popularity of Diabolik spurred a long series of characters directly or indirectly inspired to him, generally noticeable by the "criminalizing K" in their name; some of them are a kind of satire.

- Max Bunker (writer) and Magnus created in the 1960s two of these "K" characters, Kriminal and Satanik, the second being a feminine and horror version. Both are distinguished for their greater realism and for a more substantial sexy style.
- Killing, an Italian comic book.
- Paperinik (Duck Avenger) is the volatile superheroic alter-ego of Donald Duck created by Elisa Penna, Guido Martina and Giovan Battista Carpi in 1969. Initially an antihero parody/homage to Fantômas and Diabolik, he quickly became a crimefighter.
- Cattivik is a humorous version of Diabolik created by Franco Bonvicini in 1967: cattivo means evil/bad in Italian, while diabolico means diabolical.
- Dorellik is the name of a film starring singer and actor Johnny Dorelli.
- Fantomex is a character created by Grant Morrison during their run writing X-Men. He is a master thief using technological gadgets and his uniform is similar to Diabolik's, but coloured white. He is assisted by an artificial intelligence called E.V.A.
- Mike Patton had decided on either Fantômas or Diabolik for his avant-garde metal band, ultimately called Fantômas.
- The Beastie Boys music video for the song "Body Movin'" is a direct parody of Danger: Diabolik and features many clips from the movie itself.
- Millar & McNiven's Nemesis
- A racing driver named "Diabolik" who races in the Superstars Series, who never takes off his balaclava.

In real life, Matteo Messina Denaro, a prominent figure in the Sicilian Mafia who was considered to be a candidate to become the next capo di tutti capi, was nicknamed "Diabolik", after the comic book character.
