= Serena Rossi =

Italian actress and singer (born 1985)

- Serena Rossi in Venice Film Festival 2026
- Born: 31 August 1985 (age 41); Naples, Italy
- Occupations: Actress; singer
- Years active: 2003–present
- Height: 1.68 m (5 ft 6 in)

Serena Rossi (born 31 August 1985) is an Italian actress and singer. She is best known for portraying Carmen Catalano in Rai 3 soap opera Un posto al sole (2003–2010). She subsequently starred in a variety of stage and film productions and lent her voice to animate television and film. In 2019 she gained widespread recognition for portraying singer Mia Martini in the biographical drama Io sono Mia, for which she was awarded with a Nastro d'Argento.

== Biography ==
Born and raised in Naples, Serena Rossi comes from an artistic family originally from Montefalcone nel Sannio, in the Province of Campobasso, Molise.

After a variety of small musical roles on stage, Rossi rose to prominence in 2003 starring as Carmen Catalano in Rai 3 soap opera Un posto al sole, from season eight to season fourteen. She later reprised the role in the second season of its spin-off Un posto al sole d'estate.

In 2005, Rossi returned on stage in her first lead engagement starring in Mal'aria, a musical inspired by Romeo and Juliet but set in Naples. The musical was performed at Teatro Palaparthenope in Naples.

The following year, Serena Rossi signed with EMI and released her debut extended play, Amore che, a folk-pop record conteining five song written by Franco Fasano. The songs were promoted by Rossi during the tenth season of Un posto al sole. She also guest-starred in the internationally popular hit detective series Inspector Montalbano, based on the novels by Andrea Camilleri, in the episode "La vampa d'agosto", which aired on November 2, 2008.

In 2011, Rossi starred in Rai 1 comedy-drama series Che Dio ci aiuti, playing the single mother Giulia Sabatini. For the role, she won the Massimo Troisi Award for "Best Comedy Actress". Rossi left the series after the first season. The following year, Rossi appearaed in a recurring capacity in the third season of Canale 5 police procedural series R.I.S. Roma – Delitti imperfetti.

In 2013, Serena Rossi was chosen as the Italian voice of Anna for the Disney animated fantasy film Frozen. She released the official Italian soundtrack album, featuring all the original songs in Italian with co-lead vocals by Serena Autieri, the Italian voice of Elsa. Rossi reprised the role in all the subsequent installments. In the same year, she returned on stage playing the female lead Rosetta in a new production of the popular musical Rugantino, directed by Enrico Brignano and performed at Teatro Sistina in Rome. On December 16, 2013, the artist released her debut studio album Nella casa di pepe, produced by Paolo Varriale.

In 2014, Serena Rossi made her major feature film debut starring in the heist comedy film Song'e Napule, directed by Manetti Bros. The film premiered at Rome Film Festival in 2013 and was released on April 17, 2014 in Italian theaters receiving positive reviews by critics and winning a variety of awards including two David di Donatello, three Nastro d'Argento and a Globo d'Oro. For her portrayal, Rossi won an Italian Movie Award for Best Actress. In the same year, Rossi competed during the fourth season of the reality competition series Tale e quale show, based on the format of Your Face Sounds Familiar. During the show, the artist impersonated numerous popular singers, including Pharrell Williams, Beyoncé, Tosca, Mariah Carey, Michael Jackson and Elisa. On December 2, 2014, Rossi was featured in Matteo Becucci's fourth studio album Tutti quanti Mery in the cover song "Vorrei incontrarti fra cent'anni", originally performed by Ron and Tosca.

In 2017, Serena Rossi received widespread recognition starring as Fatima in Manetti Bros. musical comedy film Love and Bullets. The film premiered during the 74th Venice International Film Festival and won all the major Italian film awards including David di Donatello for Best Film, Best Costumes, Best Score and Best Original Song (for "Bang Bang", performed by Rossi, Franco Ricciardi and Giampaolo Morelli). Rossi also won the Nastro d'Argento for Best Original Song for "Bang Bang", and received the "Colpo di fulmine Award" during the Ciak d'Oro ceremony. In the same year, Serena Rossi was featured as a part-time host in the talk-variety show Detto fatto and as a judge in the second season of the children's talent competition series Piccoli giganti. Rossi also hosted a concert special for Radio Italia and the Rai 1 music variety special Celebration, alsongside Neri Marcorè. The following year, Serena Rossi was featured as a commentator during the finals of the Eurovision Song Contest 2018 and dubbed Emily Blunt as Mary Poppins in the Italian version of the 2018 film Mary Poppins Returns.

In 2019, Serena Rossi starred as singer-songwriter Mia Martini in the biographical drama film Io sono Mia, directed by Riccardo Donna. The film follows Martini's artistic career, her entourage, her sister Loredana Bertè, and the tumultuous relationships with her parents. For her portrayal, Rossi received critical acclaim and was awarded with a Special Nastro d'Argento Award. To promote the film, Serena Rossi performed Martini's huge hit single "Almeno tu nell'universo" with Claudio Baglioni during the Sanremo Music Festival 2019. In the same year, Rossi starred in the comedy film Brave ragazze and reprised the role of Anna in Disney's Frozen 2.

In 2020, Rossi starred in the romantic comedy 7 ore per farti innamorare, for which she was nominated for a Nastro d'Argento and a Ciak d'Oro for Best Actress, and appeared in Stefano Mordini's thriller You Came Back, presented as the closing film during the 77th Venice International Film Festival. The following year, Rossi starred as the titular role in Rai 1 comedy-drama series Mina Settembre, which ran for three seasons, ending in February 2025. In the same year, Serena Rossi hosted the variety show Canzone segreta and appeared in the Naples-themed episode of Alberto Angela's show Stanotte a…, that aired on December 25.

In 2024, Serena Rossi starred in the drama film The Children's Train, directed by Cristina Comencini and based on the novel of the same name by Viola Ardone. The film premiered during the 19th Rome Film Festival and was later released on Netflix.

In 2025, Rossi co-wrote, co-directed, co-produced and starred in the original stage musical SereNata a Napoli. Set in Rossi's native town Naples and inspired by the Canzone napoletana, the show embarked a National tour on the main Italian stages. The official soundtrack album, featuring all the songs performed by Rossi during the show, was released on January 30, 2026 through Warner Music Italy. In the same year, Serena Rossi also voiced Gal Gadot as the Evil Queens in the live-action remake Snow White.

== Filmography ==
=== Film ===
Year	Title	Role(s)	Notes
2007	Liberarsi: Figli di una rivoluzione minore	Teresa	
2012	La stagione dell'amore	Monica	Short film
2014	Song'e Napule	Marianna	
2014	Ti sposo ma non troppo	Luca's ex-girlfriend	Cameo appearance
2016	Troppo napoletano	Debora Iovine	
2016	Al posto tuo	Anna	
2017	Love and Bullets	Fatima	
2017	Caccia al tesoro	Rosetta	
2019	Io sono Mia	Mia Martini	
2019	Brave ragazze	Maria D'Urso	
2020	7 ore per farti innamorare	Valeria	
2020	You Came Back	Anita	
2020	La tristezza ha il sonno leggero	Flor	
2021	Diabolik	Elisabeth Gay	
2022	Beata te	Marta	
2024	The Children's Train	Antonietta Speranza	
2026	Feel My Voice	Giuliana Palumbo	

=== Television ===
Year	Title	Role(s)	Notes
2003	Salvo D'Acquisto	Francesca D'Acquisto	Television movie
2003–2010	Un posto al sole	Carmen Catalano	Series regular (season 8–14)
2004	Virginia, la monaca di Monza	Angelica	Television movie
2006	La moglie cinese	Rosaria	Television movie
2007	Un posto al sole d'estate	Carmen Catalano	Main role (season 2)
2008	Inspector Montalbano	Adriana Monreale	Episode: "La vampa d'agosto"
2009	Puccini	Cherie	Television movie
2010	Restless Heart: The Confessions of Saint Augustine	Khalidà	Television movie
2010	Ho sposato uno sbirro	Barbara Castello	Main role (season 2)
2011	Eroi per caso	Laura Palumbo	Television movie
2011	Dove la trovi una come me?	Monica	Television movie
2011–2012	Che Dio ci aiuti	Giulia Sabatini	Main role (season 1)
2012	R.I.S. Roma – Delitti imperfetti	Anita Cescon	Recurring role (season 3)
2012	Caruso, la voce dell'amore	Elvira	Television movie
2013	Il clan dei camorristi	Patrizia Teduccio	Main role
2013	Adriano Olivetti: La forza di un sogno	Teresa	Television movie
2013	Rossella	Natuzza	Main role (season 2)
2014	Tale e quale show	Herself / Contestant	Reality competition (season 4)
2015	Rex	Josephine	Episode: "Gelosia"
2015	Squadra mobile	Agent Valeria Goretti	Main role (season 1)
2016, 2018	Inspector Coliandro	Ilaria Sparzaglia	2 episodes
2017	Radio Italia Live!	Herself / Host	Concert special
2017	Il coraggio di vincere	Monica	Television movie
2017	Piccoli giganti	Herself / Judge	Children's talent competition
2017	Detto fatto	Herself / Host	Variety show (hosted from September 11–29)
2017	Celebration	Herself / Co-host	Concert special
2018	Da qui a un anno	Herself / Host	Reality show
2018	Eurovision Song Contest 2018	Herself / Commentator	Finals only
2019	Andrea Bocelli – Ali di libertà	Herself / Guest	Concert special
2021	Canzone segreta	Herself / Host	Variety show
2021	Stanotte a…	Herself / Guest	Episode: "Stanotte a Napoli"
2021–2025	Mina Settembre	Mina Settembre	Lead role
2022	La sposa	Maria Saggese	Three-parts miniseries
2024	Call My Agent - Italia	Herself	Episode: "Episode 4"
2024	Wonderboys: The Secret Treasure of Naples	Angelica / The Old Hag	Main role

=== Voice dubbing ===
Year	Title	Role(s)	Played by	Notes
2013	Frozen	Anna	Kristen Bell	
2014	Race Gurram	Spanadana "Sweety"	Shruti Haasan	
2014	Winx Club: The Mystery of the Abyss	Bloom	Original role	Singing parts only
2014	Once Upon a Time	Anna	Elizabeth Lail	TV series
2014	Into the Woods	Cinderella	Anna Kendrick	
2015	Rana Vikrama	Paru	Adah Sharma	
2015	Frozen Fever	Anna	Kristen Bell	Short film
2015	Brothers	Mary	Kareena Kapoor Khan	
2017	Olaf's Frozen Adventure	Anna	Kristen Bell	Short film
2018	Mary Poppins Returns	Mary Poppins	Emily Blunt	Singing parts only
2018	Ralph Breaks the Internet	Anna	Kristen Bell	
2019	Frozen 2	Anna	Kristen Bell	
2020	Once Upon a Snowman	Anna	Kristen Bell	Short film
2021	Queenpins	Connie Kaminski	Kristen Bell	
2023	Once Upon a Studio	Anna	Kristen Bell	Short film
2023	Migration	Pam Mallard	Elizabeth Banks	
2025	Snow White	Evil Queen	Gal Gadot	Singing parts only

== Stage ==
Year	Title	Role(s)	Venue	Notes
2002–2003	C'era una volta… Scugnizzi	Ensemble	Teatro Augusteo, Naples	
2005	Mal'aria	Giulietta	Palapartenope, Naples	
2013	Rugantino	Rosetta	Teatro Sistina, Rome	
2025–2026	SereNata a Napoli	Serena	Italian tour	Also co-writer and co-director

== Discography ==
=== Studio albums ===
- Nella casa di pepe (2013)

=== Soundtrack albums ===
- Serenata a Napoli (2026)

=== Extended plays ===
- Amore che (2006)

=== Cast recordings ===
- Frozen - Il regno di ghiaccio (2013)
- Ammore e malavita (2017)
- Io sono Mia (2019)
- Frozen II - Il segreto di Arendelle (2019)
- Il treno dei bambini (2024)

== Awards and nominations ==
Award	Year	Category	Nominated work	Result	Ref.
Campania Film Gala	2016	Best Actress	Troppo napoletano	Won	
Ciak d'oro	2018	"Colpo di fulmine" Award	Love and Bullets	Won	
Ciak d'oro	2020	Best Actress	Io sono Mia	Nominated	
Ciak d'oro	2021	Best Actress	La tristezza ha il sonno leggero	Won	
Ciak d'oro	2023	Category "TV Series" – Best Italian Actress	Mina Settembre	Nominated	
David di Donatello	2018	Best Original Song	"Bang Bang" (from Love and Bullets)	Won	
Giffoni Film Festival	2015	Giffoni Experience Award	Herself	Won	
Giffoni Film Festival	2020	Giffoni Experience Award	Herself	Won	
Italian Movie Award	2015	Best Actress	Song'e Napule	Won	
Massimo Troisi Award	2013	Best Comedy Actress	Che Dio ci aiuti	Won	
Nastro d'Argento	2018	Best Original Song	"Bang Bang" (from Love and Bullets)	Won	
Nastro d'Argento	2018	Best Actress (Comedy)	Love and Bullets	Nominated	
Nastro d'Argento	2019	Nastro d'Argento Special Award	Io sono Mia	Won	
Pellicola d'Oro	2022	Best Actress	Mina Settembre	Won	
Pellicola d'Oro	2023	Best Actress	Mina Settembre	Nominated	
Pellicola d'Oro	2025	Best Actress	The Children's Train	Won	
Sorrento Film Festival	2017	Best Actress	Love and Bullets	Won	
Tertio Millennio Film Fest	2017	Best Actress	Love and Bullets	Won	
Venice Film Festival	2018	Kineo Diamanti Award	Love and Bullets	Won	
