= Eva Kant =

- Diabolik and Eva Kant portrait by Sergio Zaniboni.

Publication information
- Publisher: Astorina
- First appearance: Diabolik #3 (3 March 1963)
- Created by: Angela Giussani; Luciana Giussani

In-story information
- Full name: Lady Eva Kant (as Kiss Tímea)
- Supporting character of: Diabolik
- Abilities: Skilled martial artist

Eva Kant is an Italian comics character who originated in the series Diabolik, issue #3 (3 March 1963).

The character is extremely popular in Italy, where she reached the status of fashion icon.

== Fictional character biography ==
Eva is the girlfriend and sidekick of criminal mastermind Diabolik; like him, she is a master thief with expertise in gathering information, bypassing security measures, and utilizing lifelike masks as a means of deception. She is typically portrayed as an attractive blonde young woman; she drives a white E-Type Jaguar, and usually goes into action wearing a heavy sweater and trousers, no mask (unlike Diabolik). She usually wears her hair up.

== Appearances in other media ==
=== Animated series ===
Eva appeared in the 1999 Diabolik animated television series, which also provided her character with a backstory. Her voice was provided by Sonia Mazza in Italian and by Megan Fahlenbock in English.

=== Live-action films ===
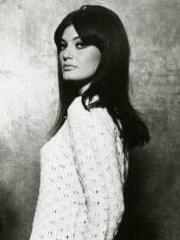
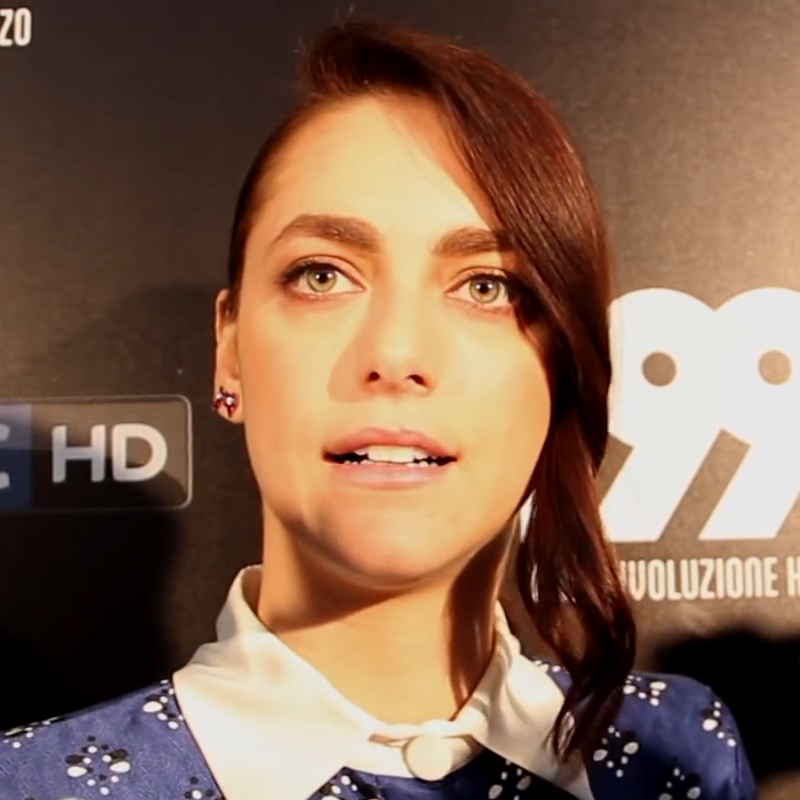
Eva was first portrayed by Marisa Mell (left) in the 1968 film Danger: Diabolik; she was later played by Miriam Leone (right) in Diabolik (2021) and its sequels Diabolik: Ginko Attacks! (2022) and Diabolik: Who Are You? (2023).

In 1968's Danger: Diabolik by Mario Bava, Eva is played by Marisa Mell, and in general wears more revealing clothing than in her comic appearances. She also wears her long hair down, abandoning her trademark hairstyle.

She is played by actress Miriam Leone in the eponymous 2021 film directed by the Manetti Bros. Leone reprised her role in the film's two sequels, Ginko Attacks! and Who Are You?.

=== Music videos and tributes ===
In the Tiromancino's music video "Amore impossibile", directed by Lamberto Bava, Eva is played by Claudia Gerini. Gerini would later make a cameo appearance in the 2021 film as a socialite who is later revealed to be Eva in a mask.

In 2005, Eva is played by Roberta Potrich in the video for the 50th anniversary of the Fiat 600.
