= Love and Bullets (2017 film) =

2017 film

- Film poster
- Neapolitan: Ammore e malavita
- Directed by: Manetti Bros.
- Written by: Michelangelo La Neve; Manetti Bros.
- Starring: Giampaolo Morelli; Serena Rossi; Claudia Gerini; Carlo Buccirosso; Raiz
- Cinematography: Francesca Amitrano
- Music by: Pivio and Aldo De Scalzi
- Release dates: 6 September 2017 (Venice); 5 October 2017 (Italy)
- Running time: 133 minutes
- Country: Italy
- Language: Italian

Love and Bullets (Neapolitan: Ammore e malavita) is a 2017 Italian musical comedy film directed by the Manetti Bros. It was screened in the main competition section of the 74th Venice International Film Festival and winner of Best Film at the David di Donatello prize in 2018.

== Cast ==
- Claudia Gerini as Donna Maria
- Carlo Buccirosso as don Vincenzo
- Serena Rossi as Fatima
- Giampaolo Morelli as Ciro
- Raiz as Rosary
- Franco Ricciardi as Gennaro
- Antonio Buonomo (actor) as Uncle Mimmo
- Giovanni Esposito as Rival boss
- Ivan Granatino as Young killer
- Giuseppe "The King" Danza as Killer of the rival boss
- Claudia Federica Petrella as Mariellina
- Antonella Morea as Caregiver
- Marco Mario de Notaris as Doctor
- Rosalia Porcaro as Acquaintance of Fatima
- Patrizio Rispo as Stationer
- Ronnie Marmo as Frank Strozzalone
- Stefano Moffa as Police Inspector
- Lucianna De Falco as Sister of Don Vincenzo
- Graziella Marina as Mother of Don Vincenzo
- Antonio Fiorillo as Grandson of Don Vincenzo
- Antonino Iuorio as Lawyer
- Mario Rivelli as Young policeman
- Andrea D'Alessio as Tourist guide
- Tia Architto as American tourist
- Pino Mauro as Master
- Antonello Cossia as Antonello

== Awards ==
Year	Award/Festival	Category	Winner/Nominee	Result
2017	74th Venice Film Festival	Golden Lion	Manetti Bros.	Nominated
2017	74th Venice Film Festival	Green Drop Award	Manetti Bros	Nominated
2017	74th Venice Film Festival	Queer Lion	Manetti Bros.	Nominated
2017	74th Venice Film Festival	Pasinetti Award for the Best Film	Manetti Bros.	Won
2017	74th Venice Film Festival	Pasinetti Award for the Best Actors	The ensemble cast	Won
2017	74th Venice Film Festival	Special Soundtrack Stars Award for the Best music	Pivio and Aldo De Scalzi	Won
2017	74th Venice Film Festival	La Pellicola d’Oro Award for Best Production Manager	Daniele Spinozzi	Won
