= Paura =

2012 Italian horror film

- Film poster
- Directed by: Manetti Bros.
- Written by: Manetti Bros. Giampiero Rigosi; Michele Cogo
- Produced by: Manetti Bros.
- Starring: Peppe Servillo; Francesca Cuttica; Domenico Diele; Lorenzo Pedrotti; Claudio Di Biagio
- Cinematography: Gian Filippo Corticelli
- Edited by: Federico Maneschi
- Music by: Pivio
- Release date: 15 June 2012
- Running time: 108 minutes
- Country: Italy
- Language: Italian

Paura (lit. 'Fear', also known as Paura 3D) is a 2012 Italian horror film directed by the Manetti Bros.

== Cast ==
- Peppe Servillo as Marchese Lanzi
- Francesca Cuttica as Sabrina
- Domenico Diele as Ale
- Lorenzo Pedrotti as Simone
- Claudio Di Biagio as Marco
- Svetlana Kevral as Elena
- Marco Manetti as the owner of the rehearsal room
- Paolo Sassanelli as the mechanic
- Antonio Tentori as the professor
- Claudia Genolini as Milena
- Daniele Addei as Milena's friend
