= Megan Fahlenbock =

Canadian actress (born 1971)

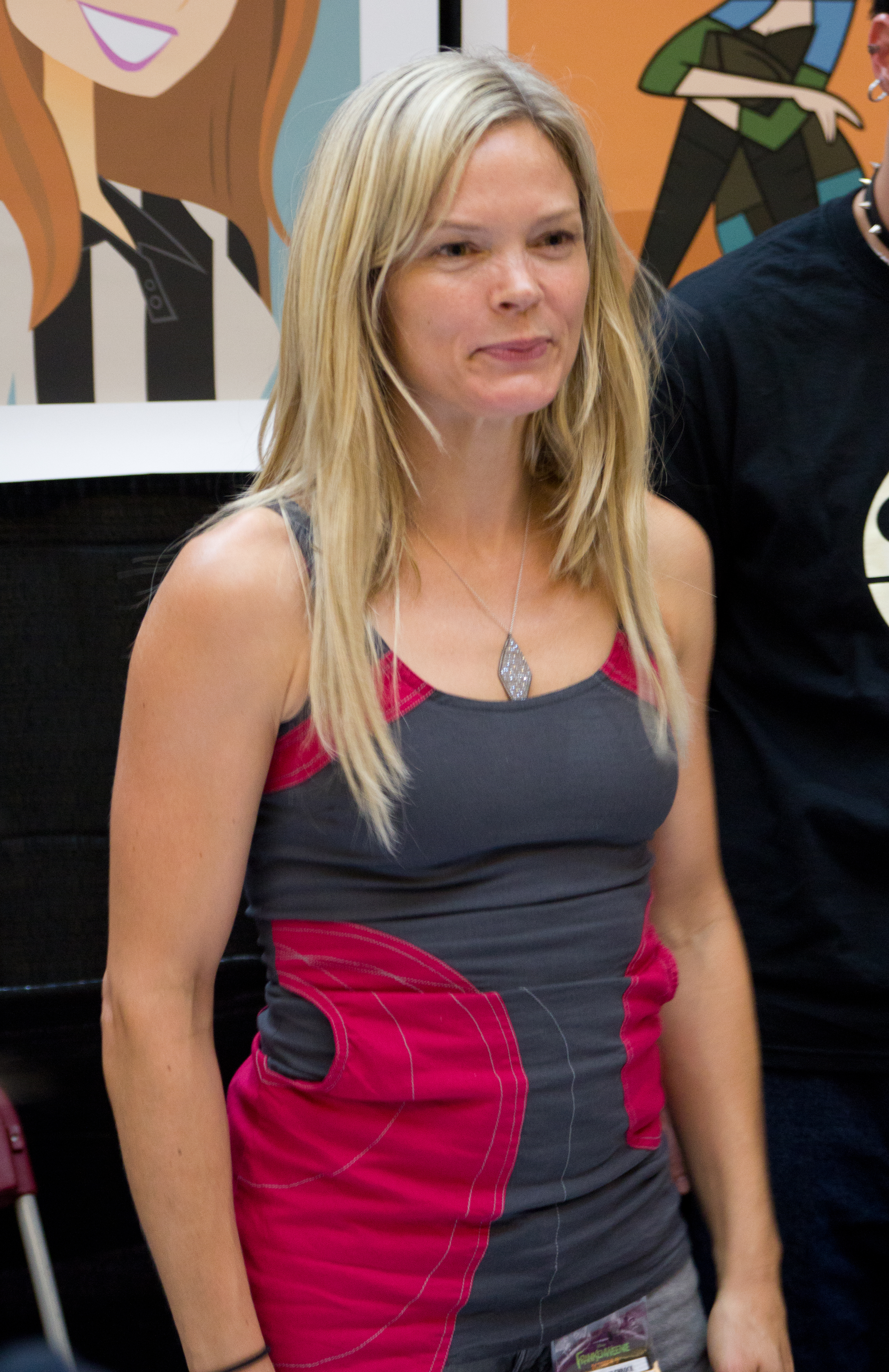
- Fahlenbock at the 2012 Fan Expo Canada
- Born: Megan Smith Fahlenbock; June 30, 1971 (age 55); Toronto, Ontario, Canada
- Occupation: Actress
- Years active: 1987–present
- Website: meganfahlenbock.com

Megan Smith Fahlenbock (born June 30, 1971) is a Canadian actress. She has worked in animation and also had a few film roles. She is best known for her voice roles as Gwen in Total Drama, Jen Masterson in 6teen, and Eva Kant in Diabolik.

== Filmography ==
=== Film ===
Year	Title	Role	Notes
2001	Get Over It	Shirin Kellysa	
2004	Resident Evil: Apocalypse	Maria Mapes	
2006	Sam's Lake	Melanie	
2006	The Last Sect	Jess	
2008	The Baby Formula	Lilith	
2008	Hooked on Speedman	Christy	
2009	The Death of Alice Blue	Sharon	
2013	The Returned	Mother	
2019	Christmas with a Prince: Becoming Royal	Journalist	
TBA	The Moon Thorn	Nora	Pre-production

=== Television ===
Year	Title	Role	Notes
1987	Lena: My 100 Children	Hanka	TV movie
1997	Diabolik	Eva Kant	Episode: "Panther Uncaged"
1997	Johnny 2.0	Wounded Terrorist	TV movie
1999	Cry Rape	Bar Heckler	TV movie
1999	Twice in a Lifetime	Young Brooke Canby	Episode: "O'er the Ramparts We Watched"
2000	Diabolik	Eva Kant	Voice
2000	Amazon	Tamarra	2 episodes
2000	La Femme Nikita	Claire Brooks	Episode: "Time to Be Heroes"
2000	The Deadly Look of Love	Veronica Flanders	TV movie
2000	Relic Hunter	Kelly	Episode: "Cross of Voodoo"
2000	Livin' For Love: The Natalie Cole Story	Grace	TV movie
2001	Snap Decision	Sarah Jenkins	TV movie
2001	Pulling Punches	Mandy	Short
2001	The 5th Quadrant	Elizabeth "Liz" Powell	Episode: "X-Periment X"
2001–2003	Blue Murder	Anita / Jan Clark	2 episodes
2002	You Belong to Me	Tiffany	TV movie
2002	Sam's Lake	Melanie	Short
2002	Countdown	Script Girl	Short
2002	Cyberchase	Unga DaBigtop (voice)	Episode: "Ecohaven CSE"
2002	Witchblade	Jennifer Haley	Episode: "Ubique"
2003	Mutant X	Claudia Manfred	Episode: "Once Around"
2003	Foolish Girl		
2004	Braceface	Claire (voice)	Episode: "Clean Slate"
2004	Stranger at the Door	Elizabeth	TV movie
2004–2010	6teen	Jen Masterson (voice)	Main cast
2005-2006	Get Ed	Deets	Main cast
2005–2009	Mr. Meaty	Various	8 episodes
2006	Succubus	Lilith	Short
2006	Yin Yang Yo!	Melodia (voice)	Episode: "Enter The Ant/Sweet Stench of Love"
2006	Sons of Butcher	Bar Girl (voice)	Episode: "Playin' the Part"
2007	Split City	Female Cop	Short
2007	Love You to Death	Sheila Prescott	Episode: "The Pond Scum Murder"
2007	Bakugan Battle Brawlers	Jenny (voice)	3 episodes
2007	Whistler	Julie	Episode: "Always a Bridesmaid"
2007	Totally Spies!	Muffy Peprich (voice)	Episode: "Evil Sorority"
2007–2013	Total Drama	Gwen (voice)	Main cast
2008	M.V.P.	Lisa	5 episodes
2009	Stoked	Sam McCloud (voice)	Episode: "Welcome to Paradise, Dudes!; uncredited
2010	The Dating Guy	Charlene (voice)	Episode: "Gross Encounters of the Virgin Kind"
2010	Skatoony	Gwen (voice)	Episode: "To the Quiz Cave"
2011	Three Mothers		Short
2011	Warehouse 13	Monica Hopper	Episode: "The New Guy"
2011	Against the Wall	Diana Whiteside	Episode: "We Have a Cop in Trouble"
2011	Life on the River	Harriet	Short
2011	Suits	Madison Price	Episode: "Rules of the Game"
2011	Being Erica	Shanley	Episode: "Sins of the Father"
2012	King	Tanya Prichard	Episode: "Charlene Francis"
2012	Good God	Missy Gooderham	Episode: "Two Treadmills"
2012–2016	Fugget About It	Victoria Huntersmith (voice)	Episode: "Casino Loyale"
2013	Dangerous Persuasions	Mary Rich	Episode: "Devil's Disciple"
2013	The Listener	Heather Brown	Episode: "The Long Con"
2013	Call Me Fitz	Hot Bully Barb	Episode: "Baby's First Brothel"
2013	Grojband	Candy Jams (voice)	Episode: "Girl Fest"
2013–2017	Hard Rock Medical	Erica	8 episodes
2014	Haven	Allison Doohan	2 episodes
2016	19-2	Claire	Episode: "Chicken"
2016	Good Witch	Kristen	Episode: "Good Witch: Secrets of Gray House"
2016–present	PAW Patrol	Ace Sorenson	3 episodes
2017	Frankie Drake Mysteries	Ruth Adkins	Episode: "Out of Focus"
2018	Vote, Dude!	Jen Masterson (voice)	Short
2018	Total DramaRama	Older Gwen (voice)	Episode: "Tiger Fail"
2018	Christmas with a Prince	Journalist	TV movie; uncredited
2019	Corn & Peg	Horse #2 (voice)	Episode: "Parade Problems/Do Good Stand"
2020	The Dog & Pony Show	(voice)	Episode: "Say It With Frosting!"
2021	Ginny & Georgia	Amber Lynn Driscoll	3 episodes
2021	Kingdom Force	Mittens (voice)	Episode: "Runaway Train/Forecast: Chaos"

=== Video games ===
Year	Title	Voice role
2001	X-Men: Mutant Academy 2	Anna Marie / Rogue
2018	Starlink: Battle for Atlas	Additional Voices
