= Michelangelo La Neve =

Italian comics writer and screenwriter (1959–2022)

Michelangelo La Neve (14 March 1959 – 18 January 2022) was an Italian comics writer and screenwriter.

== Life and career ==
Born in Tarsia, in the province of Cosenza, La Neve grew up in Varese, and after graduating from high school he moved to Rome. He made his professional debut in the early 1990s writing comics stories mainly of horror genre for magazines such as Zio Tibia, Splatter, Blue and Mostri. After writing the miniseries ESP for the magazine Intrepido, between 1992 and 2006 he collaborated with Sergio Bonelli Editore, as a writer for the comic book series Dylan Dog and Martin Mystère.

In later years he focused his activity on graphic novels (notably Day of the Magicians, illustrated by Marco Nizzoli), and started collaborating as a screenwriter with Manetti Bros. for the TV-series L'ispettore Coliandro and Inspector Rex and for the films Song'e Napule, Love and Bullets and Diabolik.

La Neve was married to Mariella Pazienza, the sister of comic artist Andrea Pazienza. He died after a long illness in Rome on 18 January 2022, at the age of 62. His son Lorenzo is also a comics writer.
