= Sergio Zaniboni =

Italian comics artist and writer

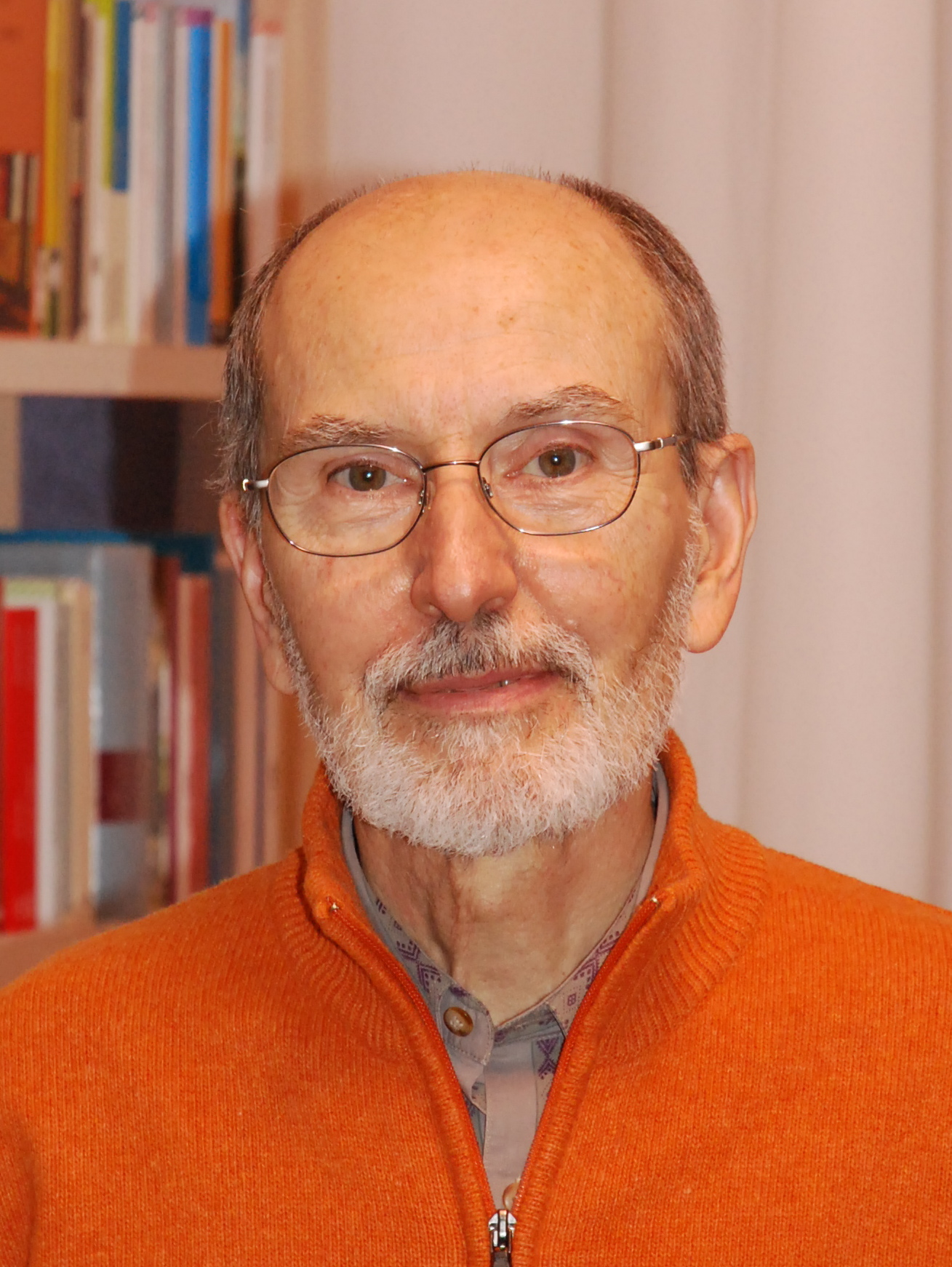
Sergio Zaniboni.

Sergio Zaniboni (4 August 1937 – 18 August 2017) was an Italian comics artist and writer. He was especially known as the artist of numerous stories for Diabolik.

== Career ==
Born in Turin, Zaniboni started his comics career after working in technical design and advertisement. In 1967 he collaborated with the magazine Horror and, two years later, he began to collaborate with Diabolik, for which he worked until 2015.

From 1972 he also collaborates with Il Giornalino, for which he produced Il Campione (a series set in the boxing world, written by Alberto Ongaro) and the police series Tenente Marlo, with stories by Claudio Nizzi. In the 1970s Zaniboni was also artist for the series I Reporters for the magazine Orient Express. In the 1980s his works included Speedy Car for Il Giornalino, and Pam/Peter, a one-shot written by Luigi Mignacco and published on the magazine Comic Art.

In 1991 he pencilled a long story for Tex Willer. In the same decade Zaniboni produced Reporter Blues e Maj Lin for Il Giornalino. In 2000 he was award the Yellow Kid Award for his work on Diabolik.

His son Paolo Zaniboni is also a comic book artist.
