= Christopher Coake =

American fiction writer

Christopher Coake (born November 28, 1971) is an American fiction writer.

== Background ==
Coake is the author of two collections of short stories, You Would Have Told Me Not To (Delphinium Books, 2020), and We're in Trouble (Harcourt, 2005), for which he was awarded the PEN/Robert W. Bingham Prize in 2006, and of the novel You Came Back (Grand Central, 2012). He was named by the 2007 issue of the British fiction journal Granta as one of the twenty "Best Young American Novelists."

Coake currently resides in Reno, Nevada. He teaches creative writing, and directs the MFA program, at the University of Nevada, Reno. He received the Silver Pen Award from the Friends of the University of Nevada, Reno Libraries on November 14, 2013.
