= Giacomo Gianniotti =

Italian–Canadian actor (born 1989)

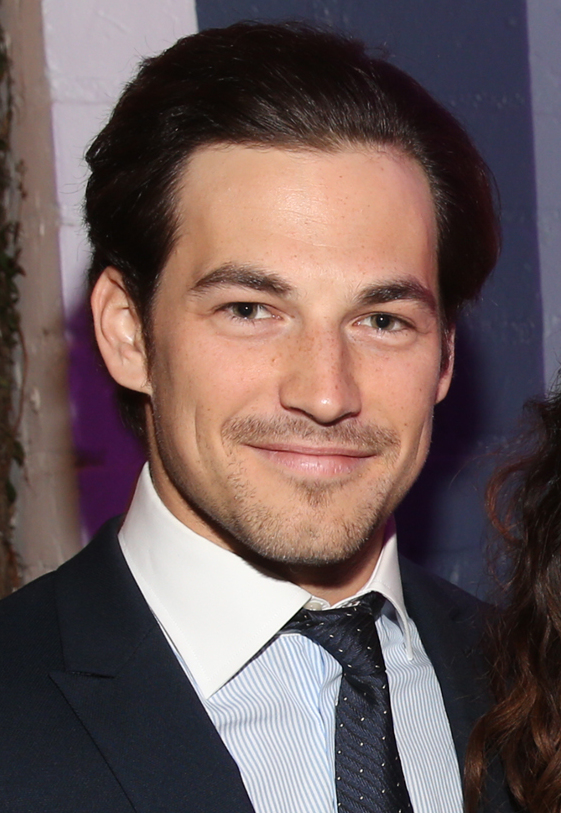
- Gianniotti in 2016
- Born: Giacomo Keaton Gianniotti; 19 June 1989 (age 37); Rome, Italy
- Citizenship: Italy; Canada; United States
- Education: Humber College
- Occupation: Actor
- Years active: 2010–present
- Spouse: Nichole Gustafson (m. 2019)

Giacomo Keaton Gianniotti (born 19 June 1989) is an Italian–Canadian film and television actor. He studied theater at Humber College and made his acting debut in the Italian television series Medicina generale in 2010.

He went on to play recurring roles in the television series Reign (2013) and Murdoch Mysteries (2013–2014). From 2015 to 2021, Gianniotti portrayed Dr. Andrew DeLuca in the medical drama series Grey's Anatomy. He also played the title character in the films Diabolik: Ginko Attacks! (2022) and Diabolik: Who Are You? (2023).

== Early life ==
Giacomo Gianniotti was born 19 June 1989, in Rome, Italy. His father is Italian and his mother is Anglo Canadian. In 1994, after his parents' marriage ended, his mother returned to Canada and he grew up in his mother's hometown of Parry Sound, Ontario. At age 16 he moved to Toronto into York Mills. He divides his time between Toronto and Rome, working in Canadian and Italian stage, films and television.

He attended high school at Cardinal Carter Academy for the Arts in Toronto, then graduated from Humber College's Theatre Program. He has also completed an actor's residency at Norman Jewison's Canadian Film Centre in Toronto.

== Career ==
His first acting experience in film was a small role in a Giulio Base's feature film featuring Shelley Winters and Vittorio Gassman, shot in the "Cinecittà" film studio in Rome. He guest starred in an episode of the Italian television series Medicina generale in 2010. He appeared in several television shows in 2013, including Beauty & the Beast and Copper, in which he starred in three episodes.

Gianniotti played a recurring role as Lord Julien in the first season of Reign. He played Leslie Garland for several episodes in Murdoch Mysteries (2013–2014, 2023). He starred as Freddy in the television series Selfie (2014), and later acted in the made-for-TV drama film The Secret Life of Marilyn Monroe.

In 2015, Gianniotti appeared in Backpackers as Andrew. Also in 2015, he was cast as surgical intern Dr. Andrew DeLuca for the last two episodes of the eleventh season of Grey's Anatomy. On 8 January 2016, he was promoted to series regular.

In 2019, Gianniotti was one of the recipients of the Top 25 Canadian Immigrant Awards presented by Canadian Immigrant magazine.

In 2021, Gianniotti won the Tell-Tale TV Award for Favorite Actor in a Network Drama Series for his role on Grey's Anatomy.

In 2024, Gianniotti starred as Elia in the Netflix Italian series Deceitful Love.

Since 2024, he has starred as Detective Cole Ellis in the series Wild Cards.

== Personal life ==
On 25 November 2017, Gianniotti became engaged to makeup artist Nichole Gustafson. They married on 28 April 2019 in Italy. On 24 February 2025, Gianniotti announced that he became an American citizen.

== Filmography ==
=== Films ===
Year	Title	Role	Notes
2013	Done	John	Short film
2014	Still	Jake	Short film
2015	The Secret Life of Marilyn Monroe	Jimmy Dougherty	Television film
2016	Race	Sam Stoller	
2019	The Cuban	Kris	
2020	Acquainted	Drew	
2021	Luca	Giacomo	Voice
2022	Diabolik: Ginko Attacks!	Diabolik	
2023	Diabolik: Who Are You?	Diabolik	

=== Television ===
Year	Title	Role	Notes
2010	Medicina generale	Alberto Talenti	Episode: "Separazioni"
2013	Beauty & the Beast	Mayor's Aide	Episode: "Anniversary"
2013	Copper	Donovan's Clerk	3 episodes
2013	Time Tremors	Mr. Vincent	Episode: "Facing the Fear"
2013	Reign	Lord Julien	Recurring role (5 episodes)
2013–2023	Murdoch Mysteries	Leslie Garland	Recurring role (10 episodes)
2014	Selfie	Freddy	9 episodes
2015	Backpackers	Andrew	4 episodes
2015–2021	Grey's Anatomy	Dr. Andrew DeLuca	Guest (season 11); Main cast (seasons 12–17); 110 episodes Nominated - Golden Maple Award for Best actor in a TV series broadcast in the U.S. (2016); Nominated - Golden Maple Award for Newcomer of the year in a TV series broadcast in the U.S. (2016)
2018–2021	Station 19	Dr. Andrew DeLuca	3 episodes
2022	From Scratch	Giancarlo Caldesi	Guest role
2024	Deceitful Love	Elia	
2024–present	Wild Cards	Detective Cole Ellis	Main role

=== Video games ===
Year	Title	Role	Notes
2020	Marvel's Avengers	Hawkeye/Clint Barton	Post-release DLC
2022	Horizon: Forbidden West	Drakka	Base Game Content
