= Manetti Bros. =

Italian film directors, screenwriters and actors

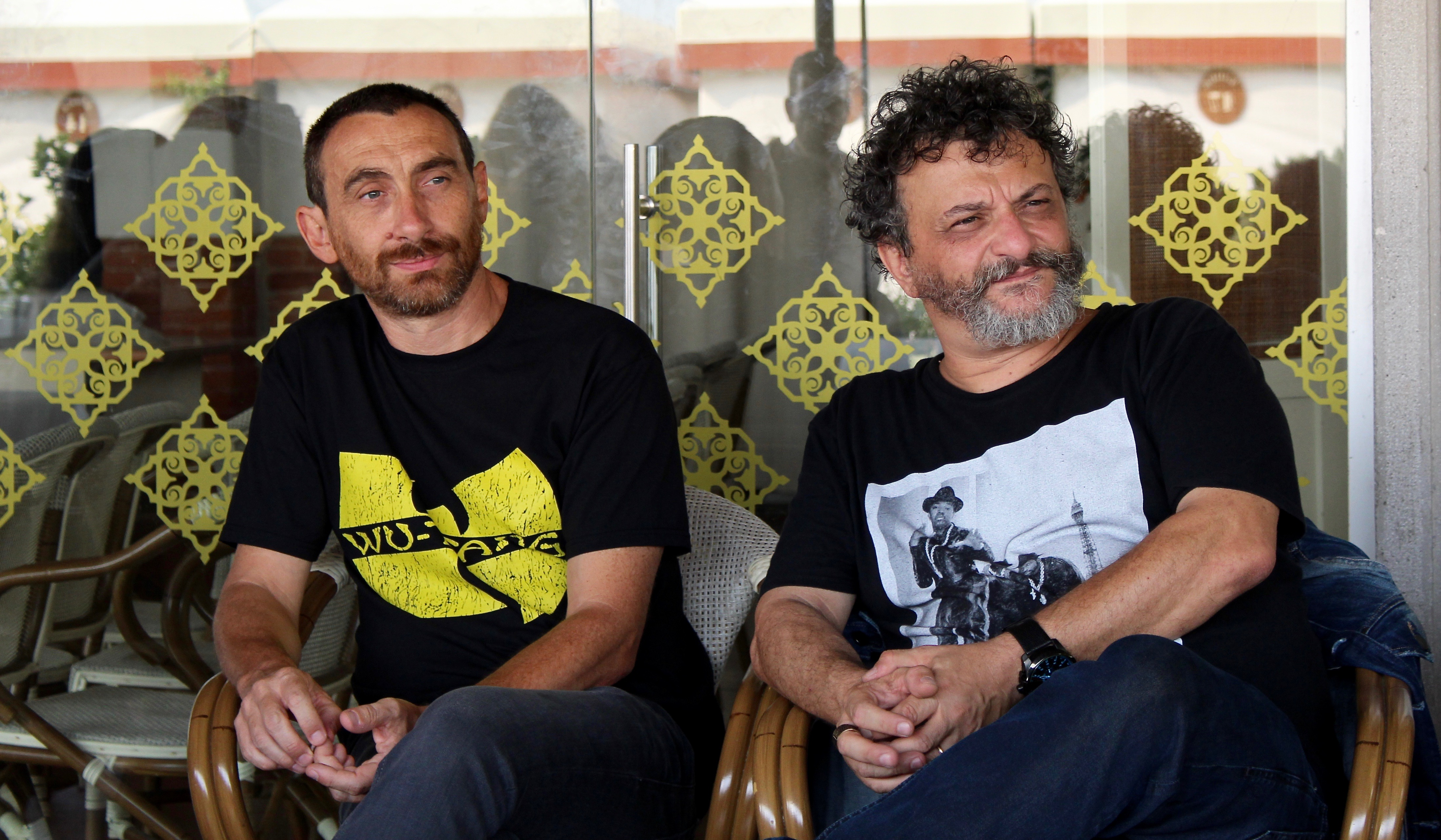
- Antonio (left) and Marco (right) Manetti, at the 2017 Venice Film Festival
- Born: Marco: 15 January 1968 (age 58); Rome, Italy Antonio: 16 September 1970 (age 56); Rome, Italy
- Occupations: Film directors, producers; screenwriters; cinematographers
- Years active: 1995–present

Marco (born 15 January 1968) and Antonio Manetti (born 16 September 1970), collectively referred to as Manetti Bros., are Italian filmmakers, famous for their musical comedies.

== Biography ==
After having directed more than a hundred video clips, for singers such as Piotta, Alex Britti, Mietta, Mariella Nava and Max Pezzali and after their first unfortunate experience behind the camera with Zora the Vampire, the Manetti Bros. direct a small-budget thriller film, set mostly in an elevator: Floor 17. Most of the cast of that film worked once again with the brothers on the TV series L'ispettore Coliandro, based on the stories by Carlo Lucarelli: the series is a success and has been renewed for seven seasons.

In the 2010s the brothers directed their two most celebrated films, both set in Naples: Song'e Napule, a comical tribute to the 1970s poliziotteschi, screened at the 2013 Rome Film Festival, and Love and Bullets, a musical comedy presented at the 2017 Venice Film Festival. Both movies received critical acclaim and the latter won the David di Donatello Award for Best Picture.

In 2020, they wrote and directed the film adaptation of comics series Diabolik, starring Luca Marinelli as the title character, and co-starring Miriam Leone and Valerio Mastandrea as Eva Kant and Inspector Ginko respectively. The film was scheduled to be released on 31 December 2020, and then postponed to 16 December 2021 due to the COVID-19 pandemic in Italy.

== Filmography ==
=== Film ===
- Zora the Vampire (2000)
- Floor 17 (2005)
- The Arrival of Wang (2011)
- Paura (2012)
- Song'e Napule (2013)
- Love and Bullets (2017)
- Diabolik (2021)
- Diabolik: Ginko Attacks! (2022)
- Diabolik: Who Are You? (2023)
- U.S. Palmese (2024)

=== TV series ===
- L'ispettore Coliandro (2006–2018)
- Inspector Rex (2014–2015)
