= Angela and Luciana Giussani =

Italian comic book writing duo

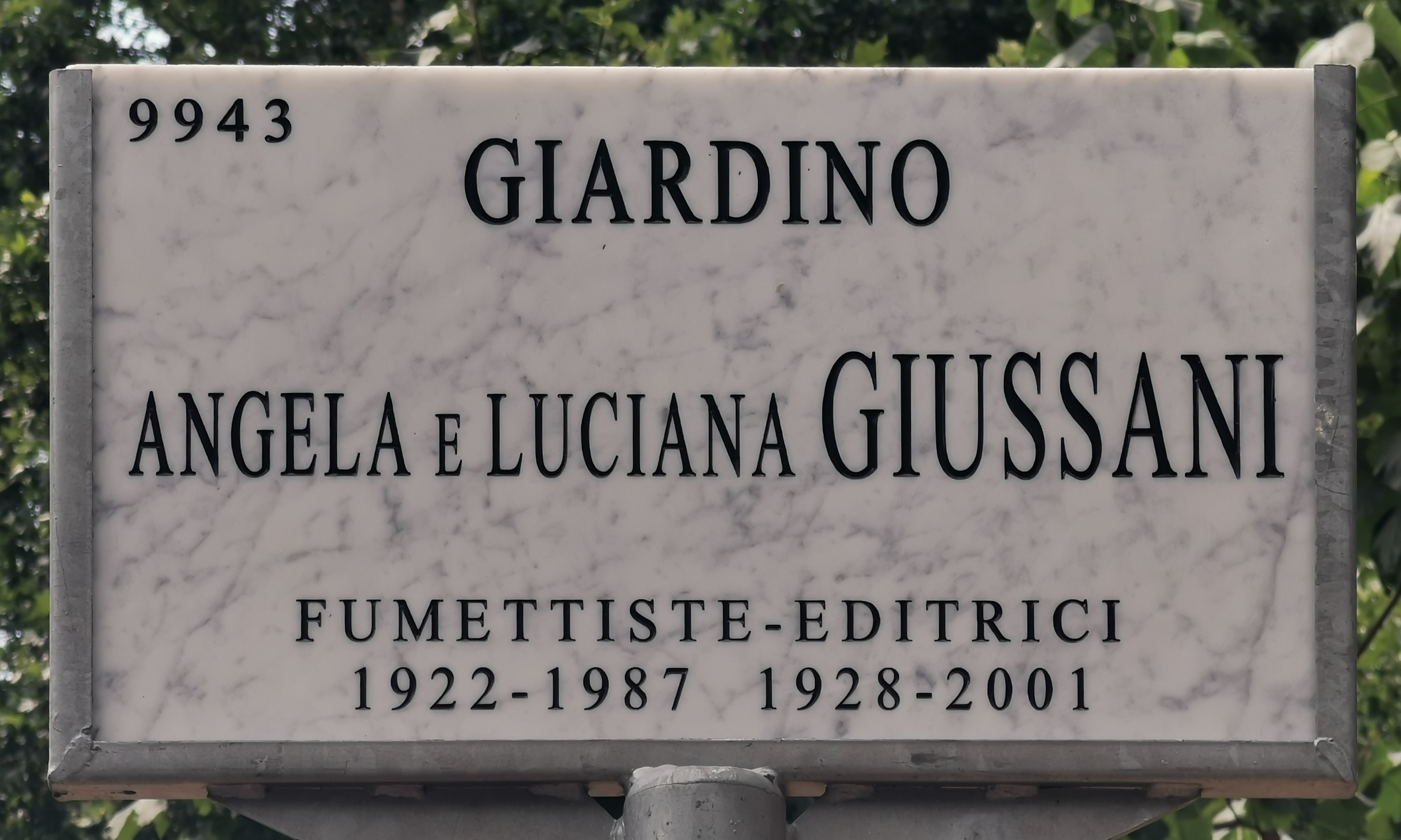
Angela and Luciana Giussani Garden Plaque in Milan

Angela Giussani (10 June 1922, Milan – 10 February 1987, Milan) and Luciana Giussani (19 April 1928, Milan – 31 March 2001, Milan) were two Italian comic book writers. They are best known for their comic book anti-hero series Diabolik. The series has sold more than 150 million copies and inspired films, a radio show, and an animated TV series.

== Biography ==
Angela Giussani was born in Milan on June 10, 1922, to a family of entrepreneurs. Her family, especially her father, encouraged her to pursue a teaching career.

When World War II began, Angela left Milan and moved to Cervia in northern Italy. There, she met Gino Sansoni, who would later become her husband. After the war, she returned to Milan and reconnected with Sansoni, who had become the owner of an advertising agency and soon started the publishing house Astoria Edizioni.

The two got married in 1946, and Angela, initially a model for the advertising campaigns published by Astoria, was then hired by the publishing house, where she started working on a series of children’s books. This is when she entered the writing/publishing business. Her strength and resourcefulness pushed her further: she wanted to become independent of her husband and pursue her own projects, so after leaving Astoria, she first earned her pilot’s license and then founded her own publishing house.

Driven by the lack of entertainment literature for “grown-ups”, Angela founded Astorina. She devoted herself to drawing, developing her first comic book, ‘‘Big Ben Bolt’’, which, however, failed after only two years.

The marriage also came to an end and, after the divorce, Angela returned to her mother’s house, where she started working with her sister Luciana (6 years younger than her), with whom she would create Diabolik, the comic book that would make them famous.

Angela worked all her life on Diabolik and directed Astorina until her death, which happened on February 10, 1987, in Milan.

After Angela’s passing, Luciana took over the reins of the publishing house, signing the pages of Diabolik until the day of her death, March 31, 2001.

== ‘‘Diabolik’’: its origins ==
‘‘Diabolik’’ led to the birth of the genre of Italian black comics, with the first issue published in 1962. However, this is not the first attempt by Angela Giussani, who, as soon as “Astorina” was founded, tried to break through with ‘‘Big Ben Bolt’’, but without success.

Hence, the ‘‘lack of leisure literature for “grown-ups”’’ is the pain point that mainly drives this project, but in designing her idea, Angela addresses an even more specific problem. Indeed, she wants to give commuters the chance to pass the time on the train on their way to work with a simple, fast, and inexpensive read. Moreover, as the book/magazine must fit in their pockets, Diabolik is published in the newsstands as a pocket-sized booklet (11.5 x 16.9 cm).

The train is also the protagonist of Angela’s moment of “epiphany”, as the idea was born on the train while reading a Fantômas novel. Indeed, the sisters’ uncle Claudio, a lover of comic books and, above all, of Lupin and Fantômas, has always shared his passion with his granddaughters Angela and Luciana.

Therefore, in 1962, the first title, ‘‘Diabolik: The King of Terror’’ was born, and Angela herself wrote the plot. The name is not accidental but is closely related to a chronic fact from some years before: on February 25, 1958, in Turin, a Fiat worker, Mario Gilberti, was found wrapped in a sheet, bleeding to death. Although the murder weapon never appeared, several letters written in cryptic language were found at the scene of the crime, all signed “Diabolich”, from which the name of the comic is derived. However, the Giussanis have never confirmed to be inspired by this true story, but they have never even denied it, perhaps to create more mystery around their character.

== Diabolik, the character ==
Diabolik is an ingenious and masked thief, the protagonist of large sums of money and precious jewels stolen. Despite being a criminal, Diabolik has his own ethics: just as Robin Hood “steals from the rich and gives to the poor”, Diabolik protects the weakest to the detriment of mobsters and criminals.

At his side is Eva Kant, his life and adventure companion, who appears for the first time in the third episode, ‘‘The Diabolik’s Arrest’’ (1963), and then becomes the protagonist of several succeeding issues.

== A success story: from 1962 to today ==
Diabolik’s success is remarkable; it has been published since 1962 without interruption, and to date more than 900 issues have been published.

Furthermore, the thief does not exist only in the comics but also appears three times on the big screen: firstly in the film “Danger: Diabolik” of 1968 (by Mario Bava), then in the documentary “Diabolik is Me” of 2019 (directed by Giancarlo Soldinel) and finally in the feature film of 2021 (by the Manetti brothers).

The kind thief is also at the center of the TV series “Diabolik” of 2000, then of numerous commercials, of the radio comic aired on Rai Radio 2 and of some video games.

The success then reached a global scale with the diffusion of numerous editions of the comic translated into many European, American, and African languages.

== Sources ==
- Barzi, Davide; Faraci, Tito. Le Regine del Terrore (in Italian). Edizioni BD.
- Moraschini, S. (13 December 2021). "Diabolik, breve biografia e storia del mito creato dalle Sorelle Giussani". Biografieonline (in Italian).
- Amé, Francesca (10 February 2017). "Angela Giussani, 30 anni fa l'addio alla "mamma" di Diabolik". IO Donna (in Italian).
- Moraschini, S. (23 May 2019). "Angela Giussani. La Biografia". Biografieonline (in Italian).
- Cravero, Federica (5 February 2008). "La vera storia di Diabolik". la Repubblica (in Italian).
