= List of Italian actresses =

This is a list of notable Italian actresses, including those from other countries who mainly worked in the Italian film industry, and actresses who are of Italian descent.

Persons are listed alphabetically by surname.

== A ==
- Cele Abba (1906–1992)
- Marta Abba (1900–1988)
- Alessandra Acciai (born 1965)
- Anna Maria Ackermann (1932–2025)
- Laura Adani (1913–1996)
- Isabelle Adriani (born 1972)
- Lucilla Agosti (born 1978)
- Janet Agren (born 1949) (Swedish actress who mainly worked in Italy)
- Marcella Albani (1901–1959)
- Anna Maria Alberghetti (born 1936)
- Jane Alexander (born 1972)
- Lydia Alfonsi (1928–2022)
- Marisa Allasio (born 1936)
- Irene Aloisi (1925–1980)
- Elena Altieri (1910–1997)
- Lia Amanda (born 1932)
- Adriana Ambesi (1940–2023)
- Anna Ammirati (born 1979)
- Gabriella Andreini (1938–2024)
- Pier Angeli (1932–1971)
- Edi Angelillo (born 1961)
- Luciana Angiolillo (1925–2014)
- Ambra Angiolini (born 1977)
- Rosina Anselmi (1880–1965)
- Carlotta Antonelli (born 1995)
- Laura Antonelli (1941–2015) (Pola, Italy: now Pula, Croatia)
- Manuela Arcuri (born 1977)
- Asia Argento (born 1975)
- Alba Arnova (1930–2018)
- Adriana Asti (1931–2025)
- Antonella Attili (born 1963)
- Serena Autieri (born 1976)
- Mimì Aylmer (1896–1992)
- Euridice Axen (born 1980)

== B ==
- Margherita Bagni (1902–1960)
- Virginia Balestrieri (1888–1960)
- Anne Bancroft (1931-2005)
- Raffaella Baracchi (born 1964)
- Paola Barale (born 1967)
- Paola Barbara (1912–1989)
- Carlotta Barilli (1935–2020)
- Isa Barzizza (1929–2023)
- Luisella Beghi (1922–2006)
- Alice Bellagamba (born 1987)
- Valentina Bellè (born 1992)
- Sonia Bergamasco (born 1966)
- Agostina Belli (born 1949)
- Laura Belli (born 1947)
- Marisa Belli (1933–2017)
- Isa Bellini (1922–2021)
- Monica Bellucci (born 1964)
- Michela Belmonte (1925–1978)
- Maria Antonietta Beluzzi (1930–1997)
- Vittoria Belvedere (born 1972)
- Femi Benussi (born 1945) (born in Rovinj in modern Croatia; at the time the Italian city of Rovigno)
- Sonia Bergamasco (born 1966)
- Gaia Bermani Amaral (born 1980)
- Mara Berni (born 1932)
- Marina Berti (1924–2002)
- Francesca Bertini (1892–1985)
- Laura Betti (1927–2004)
- Franca Bettoia (1936–2024)
- Giulia Bevilacqua (born 1979)
- Isabella Biagini (1940–2018)
- Daniela Bianchi (born 1942)
- Regina Bianchi (1921–2013)
- Caterina Bianconelli (1665–1716)
- Valeria Bilello (born 1982)
- Clara Bindi (1927–2022)
- Lidia Biondi (1941–2016)
- Olga Bisera (born 1944)
- Erika Blanc (born 1942)
- Delia Boccardo (born 1948)
- Enrica Bonaccorti (1949–2026)
- Anna Bonaiuto (born 1950)
- Liliana Bonfatti (1930–2005)
- Luisella Boni (born 1935)
- Caterina Boratto (1915–2010)
- Paola Borboni (1900–1995)
- Lyda Borelli (1884–1959)
- Simona Borioni (born 1971)
- Giulia Boschi (born 1962)
- Lucia Bosè (1931–2020)
- Liù Bosisio (born 1936)
- Pina Bottin (1935–2024)
- Anna Maria Bottini (1916–2020)
- Silvia Bottini (born 1981)
- Brunella Bovo (1932–2017)
- Eleonora Brigliadori (born 1960)
- Nancy Brilli (born 1964)
- Lilla Brignone (1913–1984)
- Mercedes Brignone (1885–1967)
- Lidia Broccolino (born 1958)
- Barbara Bouchet (born 1943) (Czech actress raised in the United States; mostly working in Italian films)
- Nicoletta Braschi (born 1960)
- Valeria Bruni Tedeschi (born 1964)
- Maria Grazia Buccella (born 1940)
- Giusy Buscemi (born 1993)
- Margherita Buy (born 1962)

== C ==
- Clara Calamai (1909–1998)
- Giuliana Calandra (1936–2018)
- Carla Calò (1926–2019)
- Maria Pia Calzone (born 1967)
- Miranda Campa (1914–1989)
- Edy Campagnoli (1934–1995)
- Anna Campori (1917–2018)
- Gianna Maria Canale (1927–2009)
- Elisabetta Canalis (born 1978)
- Loredana Cannata (born 1975)
- Simona Caparrini (born 1972)
- Denise Capezza (born 1989)
- Wanda Capodaglio (1889–1980)
- Cristiana Capotondi (born 1980)
- Olga Capri (1883–1961)
- Debora Caprioglio (born 1968)
- Anita Caprioli (born 1973)
- Flora Carabella (1926–1999)
- Selene Caramazza (born 1993)
- Lilli Carati (1956–2014)
- Claudia Cardinale (1938–2025; born and raised in Tunis, Tunisia; came to Italy at age 18)
- Stefania Careddu (born 1945)
- Linda Caridi (born 1988)
- Olimpia Carlisi (born 1946)
- Milly Carlucci (born 1954)
- Maria Carmi (1880–1957)
- Vera Carmi (1914–1969)
- Raffaella Carrà (1943–2021)
- Alessandra Casella (born 1963)
- Chiara Caselli (born 1967)
- Maria Caserini (1884–1969)
- Maria Pia Casilio (1935–2012)
- Stefania Casini (born 1948)
- Nadia Cassini (1949–2025)
- Carla Cassola (1947–2022)
- Lina Cavalieri (1875–1944)
- Simona Cavallari (born 1971)
- Olimpia Cavalli (1930–2012)
- Valeria Cavalli (born 1959)
- Francesca Cavallin (born 1976)
- Sandra Ceccarelli (born 1967)
- Irene Cefaro (1935–2013)
- Elisa Cegani (1911–1996)
- Pina Cei (1904–2000)
- Rosalinda Celentano (born 1968)
- Athina Cenci (born 1946)
- Valentina Cervi (born 1976)
- Michela Cescon (born 1971)
- Alida Chelli (1943–2012)
- Amelia Chellini (1880–1944)
- Laura Chiatti (born 1982)
- Francesca Chillemi (born 1985)
- Valeria Ciangottini (born 1945)
- Eloisa Cianni (1932–2022)
- Gledis Cinque (born 1985)
- Gigliola Cinquetti (born 1947)
- Silvia Cohen (born 1959)
- Giada Colagrande (born 1975)
- Ada Colangeli (1913–1992)
- Silvia Colloca (born 1977)
- Francesca Romana Coluzzi (1943–2009)
- Lodovica Comello (born 1990)
- Rossella Como (1939–1986)
- Marina Confalone (born 1951)
- Maria Pia Conte (born 1944)
- Nelly Corradi (1914–1968)
- Paola Cortellesi (born 1973)
- Valentina Cortese (1923–2019)
- Elena Cotta (born 1931)
- Carolina Crescentini (born 1980)
- Maddalena Crippa (born 1957)
- Paola Tiziana Cruciani (born 1958)
- Lorella Cuccarini (born 1965)
- Geppi Cucciari (born 1973)
- Maria Grazia Cucinotta (born 1968)
- Beryl Cunningham (1946–2020)
- Barbara Cupisti (born 1962)

== D ==
- Gea Dall'Orto (born 2002)
- Milly D'Abbraccio (born 1964)
- Rubi Dalma (1906–1994)
- Jenny De Nucci (born 2000)
- Francesca D'Aloja (born 1963)
- Silvia D'Amico (born 1986)
- Mirella D'Angelo (born 1956)
- Emma Danieli (1936–1998)
- Isa Danieli (born 1937)
- Tosca D'Aquino (born 1966)
- Cecilia Dazzi (born 1969)
- Matilda De Angelis (born 1995)
- Maria Luisa De Crescenzo (born 1992)
- Titina De Filippo (1898–1965)
- Elsa De Giorgi (1914–1997)
- Piera Degli Esposti (1938–2021)
- Liana Del Balzo (1899–1982) (born in Buenos Aires, Argentina)
- Marisa Del Frate (1931–2015)
- Cristiana Dell'Anna (born 1985)
- Celeste Dalla Porta (born 1997)
- Francesca Dellera (born 1965)
- Carla Del Poggio (1925–2010)
- Lorella De Luca (1940–2014)
- Valentine Demy (born 1963)
- Barbara De Rossi (born 1960)
- Tina De Mola (1923–2012)
- Cinzia De Ponti (born 1960)
- Dina De Santis (1932–1985)
- Orchidea De Santis (born 1948)
- Francesca De Sapio (born 1945)
- Giuliana De Sio (born 1956)
- Rosemary Dexter (1944–2010)
- Ida Di Benedetto (born 1945)
- Maria Di Biase (born 1974)
- Dalila Di Lazzaro (born 1953)
- Irasema Dilián (1924–1996) (Polish actress born in Rio de Janeiro, Brazil)
- Rossana Di Lorenzo (1938–2022)
- Mariasole Di Maio (born 2001)
- Matilde Di Marzio
- Silvia Dionisio (born 1951)
- Miria Di San Servolo (1923–1991)
- Valeria D'Obici (born 1952)
- Franca Dominici (1907–1999)
- Ada Dondini (1883–1958)
- Bianca Doria (1915–1985)
- Dori Dorika (1913–1996)
- Anita Durante (1897–1994)
- Doris Duranti (1917–1995)
- Barbara D'Urso (born 1957)
- Eleonora Duse (1858–1924)

== E ==
- Laura Efrikian (born 1940)
- Antonella Elia (born 1963)
- Maria Giovanna Elmi (born 1940)
- Micaela Esdra (born 1952)
- Clotilde Esposito (born 1997)

== F ==
- Elena Fabrizi (1915–1993)
- Valeria Fabrizi (born 1936)
- Anna Falchi (born 1972) (born in Tampere, Finland)
- Tea Falco (born 1986)
- Franca Faldini (1931–2016)
- Rossella Falk (1926–2013)
- Manuela Falorni (born 1959)
- Emanuela Fanelli (born 1986)
- Leonora Fani (born 1954)
- Gabriella Farinon (born 1941)
- Anita Farra (1905–2008)
- Anna Favella (born 1983)
- Sarah Felberbaum (born 1980)
- Maddalena Fellini (1929–2004)
- Edwige Fenech (born 1948)
- Luisa Ferida (1914–1945)
- Sabrina Ferilli (born 1964)
- Isabella Ferrari (born 1964)
- Sarah Ferrati (1909–1982)
- Anna Maria Ferrero (1935–2018)
- Irene Ferri (born 1972)
- Anna Ferruzzo (born 1966)
- Anna Ferzetti (born 1982)
- Jole Fierro (1926–1988)
- Camilla Filippi (born 1979)
- Angela Finocchiaro (born 1955)
- Donatella Finocchiaro (born 1970)
- Elena Fiore (1928–1999)
- Maria Fiore (1935–2004)
- Oretta Fiume (1919–1994)
- Diane Fleri (born 1983)
- Pilar Fogliati (born 1992)
- Anna Foglietta (born 1979)
- Iaia Forte (born 1962)
- Valentina Fortunato (1928–2019)
- Antonia Fotaras (born 1999)
- Anna Fougez (1894–1966)
- Lia Franca (1912–1988)
- Ginevra Francesconi (born 2003)
- Ludovica Francesconi (born 1999)
- Rina Franchetti (1907–2010)
- Teresa Franchini (1877–1972)
- Chiara Francini (born 1979)
- Maria Grazia Francia (1931–2021)
- Connie Francis, nee Concetta Rosa Maria Franconero (1936–2025) (Italian-American pop singer and actress)
- Fulvia Franco (1931–1988)
- Rosanna Fratello (born 1951)
- Maria Frau (born 1930)
- Margherita Fumero (born 1947)
- Annette Funicello (1942–2013)

== G ==
- Scilla Gabel (born 1938)
- Anna Galiena (born 1954)
- Ely Galleani (born 1953)
- Giovanna Galletti (1916–1992)
- Ida Galli (born 1942)
- Pina Gallini (1888–1974)
- Irène Galter (1931–2018)
- Cristina Gajoni (born 1940)
- Dina Galli (1877–1951)
- Dada Gallotti (born 1935)
- Graziella Galvani (1931–2022)
- Stefania Orsola Garello (born 1963)
- Lisa Gastoni (born 1935)
- Vera Gemma (born 1970)
- Irene Genna (1931–1986)
- Lina Gennari (1911–1997)
- Chiara Gensini (born 1982)
- Olga Vittoria Gentilli (1888–1957)
- Claudia Gerini (born 1971)
- Gaia Germani (1942–2019)
- Anna Maria Gherardi (1939–2014)
- Dana Ghia (1932–2023)
- Gabriella Giacobbe (1923–1979)
- Pia Giancaro (born 1950)
- Maria Chiara Giannetta (born 1992)
- Claudia Giannotti (1937–2020)
- Vivi Gioi (1917–1975)
- Matilde Gioli (born 1989)
- Daniela Giordano (1947–2022)
- Domiziana Giordano (born 1959)
- Mariangela Giordano (1937–2011)
- Gabriella Giorgelli (born 1941)
- Eleonora Giorgi (1953–2025)
- Aurora Giovinazzo (born 2002)
- Gaia Girace (born 2003)
- Leda Gloria (1908–1997)
- Loretta Goggi (born 1950)
- Valeria Golino (born 1965)
- Angela Goodwin (1925–2016)
- Laura Gore (1918–1957)
- Gorella Gori (1900–1963)
- Giulia Elettra Gorietti (born 1988)
- Emma Gramatica (1874–1965)
- Irma Gramatica (1870–1962)
- Graziella Granata (born 1941)
- Serena Grandi (born 1958)
- Beatrice Grannò (born 1993)
- Carla Gravina (born 1941)
- Dorian Gray (1928–2011)
- José Greci (1941–2017)
- Cosetta Greco (1930–2002)
- Eva Grimaldi (born 1961)
- Nicole Grimaudo (born 1980)
- Bianca Guaccero (born 1981)
- Lorenza Guerrieri (born 1944)
- Monica Guerritore (born 1958)
- Gloria Guida (born 1955)
- Wandisa Guida (born 1935)
- Sabina Guzzanti (born 1963)
- Lucia Guzzardi (born 1927)
- Margherita Guzzinati (1940–1997)

== H ==
- Hesperia (1885–1959)
- Natasha Hovey (born 1967) (born in Beirut)

== I ==
- Francesca Inaudi (born 1977)
- Annabella Incontrera (1943–2004)
- Zoe Incrocci (1917–2003)
- Lorenza Indovina (born 1966)
- Adriana Innocenti (1926–2016)
- Tecla Insolia (born 2004)
- Sabrina Impacciatore (born 1968)

== J ==
- Silvana Jachino (1916–2004)

== K ==
- Anna Kanakis (1962–2023)
- Claudia Koll (born 1965)
- Sylva Koscina (1933–1994) (Croatian actress who mainly worked in Italy)

== L ==
- Nais Lago (1914–1983)
- Lucrezia Lante della Rovere (born 1966)
- Tina Lattanzi (1897–1997)
- Rosabell Laurenti Sellers (born 1996)
- Marisa Laurito (born 1951)
- Giulia Lazzarini (born 1934)
- Andrea Lehotská (born 1981)
- Licinia Lentini (born 1959)
- Cinzia Leone (born 1959)
- Miriam Leone (born 1985)
- Neva Leoni (born 1992)
- Virna Lisi (1936–2014)
- Antonia Liskova (born 1977)
- Elvy Lissiak (1929–1996)
- Luciana Littizzetto (born 1964)
- Barbara Livi (born 1973)
- Tiziana Lodato (born 1976)
- Valentina Lodovini (born 1978)
- Giuliana Lojodice (born 1940)
- Gina Lollobrigida (1927–2023)
- Malisa Longo (born 1950)
- Sophia Loren (born 1934)
- Mariella Lotti (1919–2004)
- Antonella Lualdi (1931–2023) (born in Beirut, Lebanon)
- Angela Luce (1937/38–2026)

== M ==
- Nicoletta Machiavelli (1944–2015)
- Beatrice Macola (1965–2001)
- Margareth Madè (born 1982)
- Anna Maestri (1924–1988)
- Pupella Maggio (1910–1999)
- Rosalia Maggio (1921–1995)
- Romana Maggiora Vergano (born 1997)
- Licia Maglietta (born 1954)
- Anna Magnani (1908–1973)
- Eva Magni (1909–2005)
- Barbara Magnolfi (born 1955)
- Elisa Mainardi (1930–2016)
- Marina Malfatti (1933–2016)
- Evi Maltagliati (1908–1986)
- Fulvia Mammi (1927–2006)
- Beatrice Mancini (1917–1987)
- Silvana Mangano (1930–1989)
- Dharma Mangia Woods (born 1994)
- Teresa Mannino (born 1970)
- Simona Marchini (born 1941)
- Alessia Marcuzzi (born 1972)
- Lina Marengo (1911–1987)
- Fiorella Mari (1928–1983)
- Valeria Marini (born 1967)
- Elsa Martinelli (1935–2017)
- Rossana Martini (1926–1988)
- Susanna Martinková (born 1946)
- Alessandra Martines (born 1963)
- Franca Marzi (1926–1989)
- Lauretta Masiero (1927–2010)
- Giulietta Masina (1921–1994)
- Lea Massari (1933–2025)
- Marina Massironi (born 1963)
- Chiara Mastalli (born 1984)
- Mary Elizabeth Mastrantonio (born 1958)
- Alessandra Mastronardi (born 1986)
- Clelia Matania (1918–1981)
- Desdemona Mazza (1901–?)
- Rosy Mazzacurati (1935–2020)
- Anna Mazzamauro (born 1938)
- Margaret Mazzantini (born 1961) (born in Dublin, Ireland)
- Silvia Mazzieri (born 1993)
- Margherita Mazzucco (born 2002)
- Rose McGowan (born 1973) (American actress born in Florence, Italy)
- Mita Medici (born 1950)
- Anna Melato (born 1952)
- Mariangela Melato (1941–2013)
- María Mercader (1918–2011)
- Elsa Merlini (1903–1983)
- Marisa Merlini (1923–2008)
- Giovanna Mezzogiorno (born 1974)
- Marcella Michelangeli (born 1943)
- Giulia Michelini (born 1985)
- Maria Michi (1921–1980)
- Alyssa Milano (born 1972)
- Valeria Milillo (born 1966)
- Gloria Milland (1940–1989)
- Milly (1905–1980)
- Sandra Milo (1933–2024)
- Sofia Milos (born 1969)
- Milva (1939–2021)
- Paola Minaccioni (born 1971)
- Minnie Minoprio (born 1942)
- Isa Miranda (1905–1982)
- Anna Miserocchi (1925–1988)
- Michela Miti (born 1963)
- Giorgia Moll (1938–2026)
- Sandra Mondaini (1931–2010)
- Romina Mondello (born 1974)
- Cinzia Monreale (born 1957)
- Nerina Montagnani (1897–1993)
- Liliane Montevecchi (1932-2018) (French-Italian actress)
- Ivana Monti (born 1947)
- Maria Amelia Monti (born 1962)
- Maria Monti (born 1935)
- Silvia Monti (1946–2026)
- Laura Morante (born 1956)
- Ana Caterina Morariu (born 1980)
- Rina Morelli (1908–1976)
- Chiara Moretti (1955–2023)
- Claudia Mori (born 1944)
- Valeria Moriconi (1931–2005)
- Jone Morino (1896–1978)
- Federica Moro (born 1965)
- Caterina Murino (born 1977)
- Alessandra Mussolini (born 1962)
- Ornella Muti (born 1955)

== N ==
- Agnese Nano (born 1965)
- Valentina Nappi (born 1990)
- Ludovica Nasti (born 2006)
- Carlotta Natoli (born 1971)
- Krista Nell (1946–1975) (Austrian actress who mainly worked in Italy)
- Francesca Neri (born 1964)
- Rosalba Neri (born 1939)
- Rosalina Neri (1927–2024)
- Daria Nicolodi (1950–2020)
- Ave Ninchi (1914–1997)
- Assia Noris (1912–1998)
- Laura Nucci (1913–1994)
- Franca Nuti (1929–2024)

== O ==
- Ilaria Occhini (1934–2019)
- Lucia Ocone (born 1974)
- Maria Rosaria Omaggio (1954–2024)
- Liana Orfei (born 1937)
- Moira Orfei (1931–2015)
- Regina Orioli (born 1977)
- Anna Orso (1938–2012)
- Wanda Osiris (1905–1994)

== P ==
- Lea Padovani (1920–1991)
- Alice Pagani (born 1998)
- Angela Pagano (1937–2024)
- Andreina Pagnani (1906–1981)
- Gabriella Pallotta (born 1938)
- Kiki Palmer (1907–1949)
- Dolores Palumbo (1912–1984)
- Luciana Paluzzi (born 1937)
- Silvana Pampanini (1925–2016)
- Alessandra Panaro (1939–2019)
- Claudia Pandolfi (born 1974)
- Germana Paolieri (1906–1998)
- Alba Parietti (born 1961)
- Elli Parvo (1915–2010)
- Marisa Pavan (1932–2023)
- Rita Pavone (born 1945)
- Amalia Pellegrini (1873–1958)
- Ines Pellegrini (born 1954)
- Fotinì Peluso (born 1999)
- Patrizia Pellegrino (born 1962)
- Dina Perbellini (1901–1984)
- Didi Perego (1935–1993)
- Tina Pica (1884–1968)
- Ottavia Piccolo (born 1949)
- Gloria Piedimonte (1955–2022)
- Anna Maria Pierangeli (1932–1971)
- Ania Pieroni (born 1957)
- Cecilia Pillado (born 1966)
- Tiziana Pini (born 1958)
- Rosita Pisano (1919–1975)
- Paola Pitagora (born 1941)
- Nilla Pizzi (1919–2011)
- Violante Placido (born 1976)
- Rossana Podestà (1934–2013)
- Daniela Poggi (born 1954)
- Isa Pola (1909–1984)
- Lucia Poli (born 1940)
- Mariasole Pollio (born 2003)
- Lina Polito (born 1954)
- Ada Pometti (born 1955)
- Antonella Ponziani (born 1964)
- Benedetta Porcaroli (born 1998)
- Romina Power (born 1951)
- Elisabetta Pozzi (born 1955)
- Moana Pozzi (1961–1994)
- Thea Prandi (1922–1961)
- Pamela Prati (born 1958)
- Anna Proclemer (1923–2013)
- Karin Proia (born 1974)
- Vittoria Puccini (born 1981)

== Q ==
- Letizia Quaranta (1892–1977)
- Lidia Quaranta (1891–1928)
- Paola Quattrini (born 1944)
- Aurora Quattrocchi (born 1943)

== R ==
- Isabella Ragonese (born 1981)
- Giovanna Ralli (born 1935)
- Micaela Ramazzotti (born 1979)
- Franca Rame (1929–2013)
- Luisa Ranieri (born 1973)
- Federica Ranchi (1939–2025)
- Galatea Ranzi (born 1967)
- Giusi Raspani Dandolo (1916–2000)
- Francesca Reggiani (born 1959)
- Pina Renzi (1901–1984)
- Francesca Rettondini (born 1968)
- Elena Sofia Ricci (born 1962)
- Katia Ricciarelli (born 1946)
- Marina Ripa Di Meana (1941–2018)
- Giuditta Rissone (1895–1977)
- Isabella Riva (1887–1985)
- Luisa Rivelli (1931–2013)
- Nicoletta Rizzi (1940–2010)
- Anna Maria Rizzoli (born 1951)
- Eva Robin's (born 1958)
- Daniela Rocca (1937–1995)
- Maria Laura Rocca (1917–1999)
- Stefania Rocca (born 1971)
- Lyla Rocco (1933–2015)
- Alba Rohrwacher (born 1979)
- Valentina Romani (born 1996)
- Dina Romano (1888–1957)
- Nicoletta Romanoff (born 1979)
- Barbara Ronchi (born 1982)
- Isabella Rossellini (born 1952)
- Alessandra De Rossi (born 1984) (Italian-Filipino actress)
- Assunta De Rossi (born 1983) (Italian-Filipino actress)
- Rosa Diletta Rossi (born 1988)
- Luisa Rossi (1925–1984)
- Eleonora Rossi Drago (1925–2007)
- Gina Rovere (born 1936)
- Giulia Rubini (born 1935)
- Leonora Ruffo (1935–2007)
- Isabel Russinova (born 1960)
- Adriana Russo (born 1954)
- Carmen Russo (born 1959)

== S ==
- Valeria Sabel (1928–2009)
- Fabrizia Sacchi (born 1971)
- Anna Safroncik (born 1981)
- Sabrina Salerno (born 1968)
- Jone Salinas (1918–1992)
- Amanda Sandrelli (born 1964)
- Stefania Sandrelli (born 1946)
- Anna Maria Sandri (born 1936)
- Maya Sansa (born 1975)
- Yvonne Sanson (1925–2003)
- Elena Santarelli (born 1981)
- Teresa Saponangelo (born 1973)
- Lucia Sardo (born 1952)
- Dina Sassoli (1920–2008)
- Lina Sastri (born 1953)
- Franca Scagnetti (1924–1999)
- Delia Scala (1929–2004)
- Gia Scala (1934-1972) (Italian-Irish actress)
- Vanessa Scalera (born 1977)
- Tecla Scarano (1894–1978)
- Carmen Scarpitta (1933–2008)
- Monica Scattini (1956–2015)
- Rosanna Schiaffino (1939–2009)
- Erna Schürer (born 1942)
- Annabella Sciorra (born 1960)
- Daphne Scoccia (born 1995)
- Paola Senatore (born 1949)
- Adriana Serra (1923–1995)
- Vira Silenti (1931–2014)
- Linda Sini (1924–1999)
- Clara Soccini (born 1999)
- Laura Solari (1913–1984)
- Valeria Solarino (born 1979)
- Olga Solbelli (1898–1976)
- Nina Soldano (born 1963)
- Marisa Solinas (1939–2019)
- Mira Sorvino (born 1967)
- Catherine Spaak (1945–2022)
- Ilaria Spada (born 1981)
- Maria Grazia Spina (1936–2025)
- Ilona Staller (born 1951)
- Simonetta Stefanelli (born 1954)
- Giulia Steigerwalt (born 1982)
- Martina Stella (born 1984)
- Marina Suma (born 1959)

== T ==
- Simona Tabasco (born 1994)
- Barbara Tabita (born 1975)
- Ida Carloni Talli (1860–1940)
- Franca Tamantini (1931–2014)
- Jenny Tamburi (1952–2006)
- Denise Tantucci (born 1997)
- Lia Tanzi (born 1948)
- Renata Tebaldi (1922-2004)
- Paola Tedesco (born 1952)
- Tilde Teldi (1878–?)
- Liliana Tellini (1925–1971)
- Rosetta Tofano (1902–1960)
- Marilù Tolo (born 1944)
- Marisa Tomei (born 1964)
- Diana Torrieri (1913–2007)
- Laura Troschel (1944–2016)
- Jasmine Trinca (born 1981)
- Fatima Trotta (born 1986)
- Antonia Truppo (born 1977)
- Luciana Turina (born 1946)

== U ==
- Marzia Ubaldi (1938–2023)

== V ==
- Caterina Valente (1931–2024)
- Mariella Valentini (born 1959)
- Franca Valeri (1920–2020)
- Valeria Valeri (1921–2019)
- Anna Valle (born 1975)
- Alida Valli (1921–2006)
- Eleonora Vallone (born 1955)
- Bice Valori (1927–1980)
- Vanna Vanni (1915–1998)
- Elena Varzi (1926–2014)
- Elsa Vazzoler (1920–1989)
- Pia Velsi (1924–2025)
- Mara Venier (born 1950)
- Linda Veras (born 1939)
- Marisa Vernati (1920–1988)
- Caterina Vertova (born 1960)
- Carmen Villani (born 1944)
- Olga Villi (1922–1989)
- Pamela Villoresi (born 1957)
- Milly Vitale (1933–2006)
- Italia Vitaliani (1866–1938)
- Monica Vitti (1931–2022)
- Sonia Viviani (born 1958)
- Lina Volonghi (1914–1991)
- Milena Vukotic (born 1935)

== W ==
- Patrizia Webley (born 1950)
- Giorgia Würth (born 1981)

== Z ==
- Halina Zalewska (1940–1976)
- Claudia Zanella (born 1979)
- Maria Zanoli (1896–1977)
- Elena Zareschi (1916–1999)
- Nietta Zocchi (1909–1981)
- Lia Zoppelli (1920–1988)

== See also ==
- Lists of actors
- List of Italian actors
- List of Italians
