= Ferrinis =

Italian musical duo

- Also known as: Ferrinis
- Born: Maicol Ferrini and Mattia Ferrini; July 7, 1997 & October 27, 1998; Forlì, Italy
- Origin: Italy
- Genres: Pop, Electronic
- Occupations: Musicians, Songwriters
- Years active: 2018 - present
- Members: Maicol Ferrini; Mattia Ferrini
- Website: ferrinis.it

Ferrinis is a musical duo consisting of Maicol Ferrini and Mattia Ferrini. The group was formed in 2018, and their music combines the dance music and Pop genres.

== Career ==
Ferrinis is a musical act that was formed by two brothers, Maicol Ferrini (born July 7, 1997) and Mattia Ferrini (born on October 27, 1998). The group was established while the brothers were living in Forlì, Italy during the early stages of the COVID-19 quarantine.

Ferrinis released their debut single in June 2019 and several successful singles in the following years, including "Per Te Morirei," "Musica Caraibica," and "Baila," both of which placed on the Italian Dance charts with airplay on several radio stations.

In 2020, Ferrinis, released a music video for their song "Roulette" on YouTube. The video features a guest appearance by The Mask, voiced by Pino Quartullo, a dubber for Jim Carrey and others. "Roulette" followed "Davy Crockett". The song explores the theme of gambling addiction, and the video was filmed at the Titano Gaming Hall in San Marino and the Francesco Baracca Aeroclub in Lugo. The video follows the story of two outlaws (The Ferrinis) who have been banned from all casinos except one located in South America. They travel there, where they are greeted and accompanied by The Mask.

In 2022, Ferrinis had singles on the Italian Dance Charts. The duo has also performed in Italy at the Holi Dance Festival and the GNX Arena. In 2023, they released the single "Dominadora".
