= La figlia di Elisa – Ritorno a Rivombrosa =

Italian television series

- Written by: Luca Biglione and Piero Bodrato
- Directed by: Stefano Alleva
- Starring: Sarah Felberbaum; Giulio Berruti
- Country of origin: Italy
- No. of episodes: 16

Production
- Producer: Guido & Maurizio De Angelis
- Editor: Carlo Balestrieri

Original release
- Release: November 4, 2007

La figlia di Elisa – Ritorno a Rivombrosa is an Italian television series broadcast in 2007, a spin-off of Elisa di Rivombrosa. Out of the cast of the original series, remain only Sabrina Sirchia (Bianca), Danilo Maria Valli (Gasparo), Giovanni Rizzuti (Titta), Simona Mastroianni (Giannina), Jane Alexander (Lucrezia) and Alessandra Barzaghi that in the first season of the series played a mother nun, while in the spin-off plays the marquis Costanza Granieri. The direction is entrusted to Stefano Alleva, former director of the second part of episodes of the second and final season of the original series.

In 2010 it was announced that the second season, with Sarah Felberbaum and Giulio Berruti as protagonists, would begin shooting in 2012, but then there were not any widespread news about it.

== Plot ==
Piemonte, 1797. Europe does not stand the changes brought about by the French Revolution and so did Italy: many piemontesi nobles, including the new king of the region-State Carlo Emanuele IV, live under some sort of control of the French and to pay the consequences are farmers and the people, harassed by soldiers greedy and unscrupulous. In this climate makes a return to Rivombrosa, after completing her studies in Paris, the Countess Agnese Ristori (Sarah Felberbaum), daughter of the Countess of Rivombrosa Elisa Scalzi (Vittoria Puccini) and Count Fabrizio Ristori (Alessandro Preziosi), are now in marriageable age. On the way back, Agnese is stopped by the men of a robber in the area, known as the sparrowhawk that, however, let go without cause her harm. Came home a little 'shock, Agnese embraces his brother Martino Ristori (Paolo Seganti), heir to Rivombrosa after his father's death, which occurred on the morning of Christmas of 1773 at the hands of a trap concocted by the late Duke Ottavio Ranieri (Luca Ward), and that of Elisa, died in 1784 (for unspecified reasons). Agnes soon realizes the great changes that have occurred in her house and discovers that the sparrowhawk, although it is feared by the French as a robber, is actually considered a hero by most of the inhabitants of the village, tired of the harassment of French and the inertia of the nobles who should provide them with protection.

Martino, meanwhile, it is next to the marriage with the Marchioness Vittoria Granieri Solaro (Anna Safroncik), a greedy woman from an impoverished noble family who wants to marry Martino only interest. Vittoria soon becomes jealous of Agnes and tries in every way to bring it closer to the captain of the French guards stationed at Rivombrosa, Lorenzo Loya (Giorgio Borghetti), a cruel man who performs crimes against farmers backed by Sergeant Saval (Francesco Bolo Rossini) . Agnese does not intend to yield to pressure the sister, and soon know a young man at a party where you will immediately fall in love: the Marquis Andrea Casalegno (Giulio Berruti). The handsome Marquis reciprocates the sentiment, but hides many secrets, including that to assume the role of Hawk and to be the son of Lucrezia Van Necker (Jane Alexander), once a bitter enemy of Elisa. Marquise Lucrezia is now old and seriously ill, but has returned from exile in Venezia until Rivombrosa, as Napoleone Bonaparte, invading Piemonte from France, abolished the penalties on old crimes. Andrea is related to the mother, but it's good, because it has inherited the character from the true late father, the Baron of Conegliano Nicola di Napoli (Sergio Assisi). However, her return enrages Martino as he feels she has not suffered enough for what she did to him and his parents. He confronts Andrea and orders him to stay away from his family. He then informs Agnese, who up until that point had been unaware of her family's full tragedy, of what happen. They visit their parents graves and Martino vows to protect Agnese from the Marquis. Meanwhile back in Rivombrosa, for the wedding of Martino, also his cousin Emilia Radicati (Valentina Pace), always in love with him, but at the time he chose to marry an artist breaking the hearts of his cousin. Agnese please his brother not to give up true love, but these now surrendered, however, decides to marry Victoria, who after the wedding want more than ever to be the only lady of Rivombrosa, and that this continues to urge the sister to accept the court of the captain Loya .

Andrea decides to open his heart to Agnese and confide the whole truth, but the shadows are plotting Lucrezia and Captain Loya, motivated by different reasons, but both with the firm intention to destroy their love. Lucrezia try to kill Agnes, but Martin, in self-defense, intervenes and shoots the Marquise, killing her instantly. Andrea Agnese sees as an accomplice of the murderer's mother and away from themselves, save backtracking after finding a letter in which Lucrezia, before dying, this confession of wanting to kill Agnese. Once you realize that it was self-defense, Andrea takes hated his late mother, thanked Martin freeing it from Loya and stop the forced marriage of the girl with the captain, who had got his hand only on the promise to free his brother.

Betrayed by Victoria, who has since begun an adulterous affair with Loya, Andrea is forced to flee to avoid capture and conviction for robbery; in his flight involves Agnese, that after the capture of the beloved does not hesitate to surrender himself to the greedy hands of the captain, that strong of his appointment as prefect of the city of Paris wants to marry the Countess to take her with him to France. A foil yet another maneuver of the Loya captain arrives lieutenant Corsini, his second, who have long been uncomfortable with the abuse and oppression of the superior, and that, in love with Dorina, personal maid countess Agnese, want a peaceful coexistence between village and soldiers.

Eventually, Loya is death for Vittoria hand, the lover betrayed, that following the murder will be escorted to France by general Ducrot to be executed (even if we do not know his fate, while Agnes and the thank Andrea); left alone, Martino can finally live peacefully his love affair with the cousin Emilia, widow of her husband, but pregnant own cousin; Agnese and Andrea, contrary to all earlier forecast, at last, be able to finally be happy, forever.

== Cast and characters ==
- Countess Agnese Ristori (Sarah Felberbaum) | Daughter of Count Fabrizio Ristori and his wife Elisa, Agnese returns to Rivombrosa from Paris, the city where he stayed for a long time in order to complete their studies. During the return trip his carriage was stopped by Hawk, very famous bandit in the region. After passing the unfortunate encounter unscathed, Agnese comes across in Marquis Andrea Van Necker, son of fearsome Lucrezia, which can not help but fall in love. Like her mother, Agnes has an indomitable character and an iron will; He believes in true love and shows several times prepared to do anything to defend the feeling that binds to Andrea, although more than once will be forced to surrender and come to terms with the captain Loya. Kind to the village inhabitants, is often a confidante in Dorina Rivalta, her maid, the first person to whom you confess your love for Andrea. Very attached to her brother and cousin Emilia, is uncomfortable with his sister in law.
- Marquis Andrea Casalegno Van Necker (Giulio Berruti) | Only son of Lucrezia Van Necker and Nicola Baron of Conegliano, owes its name to a marquis who adopted during the inaction of the mother in the republic of Venice. Back in Rivombrosa, he can not remain indifferent in the face of harassment and sorprusi perpetrated by French farmers against, so he decides to take on the role of Hawk. Brilliant and clever, Andrea is a man with a pure heart, unlike the mother, who has been hiding its ugly past. He falls in love with Agnes, knowing that their story will never be easy, and does not cease to feel the same even when the accomplice believed in the assassination of the brother of the mother. Very attached to James, the footman who is like a friend, able to forgive even when, tortured almost to madness by Loya and the fearsome Sergeant Saval, will betray him by revealing his plans.
- Count Martino Amedeo Ristori (Paolo Seganti) | Son of Count Fabrizio Ristori and an unknown woman, is the older brother of Agnes. When his father died and Elisa inherits the whole estate. He married the Marquise Vittoria Granieri Solaro, who respects but fails to love. His heart belongs to his cousin Emilia, who loved from an early age, and with which betray, shortly after the wedding, the newlyweds Victoria. Initially, it circumvents the history between Agnese and Andrea, thinking that the man resembles in every detail to the mother Lucrezia. However, after many adventures, Martino will be forced to admit you were wrong and Andrea welcome you in their family. When Victory will be taken to France following the murder of captain Loya, he is finally able to live his dream of living in Rivombrosa with the woman he loves. Concrete and man of few words, Martino is a noble, but at heart the interest of the farmers, and in order to protect them proves willing, more than once, to openly challenge captain Loya. His best friend is Count Alessandro Sturani, extremely awkward but a good-hearted man.
- Marquise Emilia Radicati di Magliano | Daughter of Countess Anna Ristori and Marquis Alvise Radicati di Magliano, Emilia loved Martino from an early age, but chose to marry Fulvio Gritti, Florentine painter of great talent, but with a very particular character. Sweet and refined, Emilia is a victim, just like her mother, of a violent and boorish husband who uses her only for his own purposes, without respect and without ever worrying about her. A close friend of the Princess of Carignano, it is in this house that will consume the betrayal of her husband damage. Only when the marquise finally opens her eyes to the true nature of Fulvio, she will be able to pull out the necessary courage to leave him, determined to start a new life. At the end she is able to fulfill the dream of living together in Rivombrosa man who loves and from whom is expecting a child.
- Captain Lorenzo Loya (Giorgio Borghetti) | Captain of the French troops stationed in Rivombrosa and antagonist of the series. He immediately showed an authoritarian and despicable man, ready to do anything to get what they want, beyond doing murders and infanticide in the area, hidden by Napoleon and King Charles Emmanuel IV. Fascinated by Agnese more for the prestige that their marriage would bring you to a real interest in him, he will come several times to blackmail her just to get her hand, always making leverage on his loved ones (promising freedom of Martino before and the salvation of Andrea then). Begins an affair with Victoria, which eventually will stop abruptly, triggering the fatal jealousy of the woman.
- Marquise Lucrezia Adelaide Priscilla Van Necker, widow Beauville (Jane Alexander) | Old enemy of the Ristori family and mother of Andrea. Despises deeply and AgnesMartin and is ready to do anything to avenge the daughter of Elisa, even to kill. But in defense of Agnes Martin rushes, that kills with one shot of hunting gun, in self-defense. Although elderly and ill, Lucrezia is shown not to have lost the enamel of murder.
- Marquise Vittoria Garnieri Solaro (Anna Safroncik) | Ambitious and determined, he decides to marry Martino Ristori not for love but out of interest. He dreams big receptions and hundreds of guests, but soon has to deal with the nature of peasant Rivombrosa, where peasants and nobles living in the same environment. Try to bring Agnese Captain Loya to eliminate competition in-law and become the new owner of Rivombrosa, but will end up falling into his own trap, starting an affair with the captain, which will fall in love despite himself. Loya then leave for Agnes and she retaliates. Eventually as the captain was shooting to Agnes but only threatening death to lower the sword to Andrea, after killing Loya, not a question of self-defense, Victory will be escorted in France and executed.
- Princess Luisa di Carignano | Mild, gentle and refined, the Princess of Carignano is the character of higher rank in the series. Often organizes receptions and parties in his palace and shows on several occasions to be a good hostess. Very attached to Agnes and Emilia, often offering their help to the latter, trapped in a difficult marriage. Another important link is with Andrea Van Necker, of which one senses to be in love, but not reciprocated. In the end, she decides to leave him, to make him stay with his big love, Agnese.
- 'Marquise Monaldo Granieri Solaro' | Olga's husband, father of Vittoria and Costanza and father in law of Martino, the Marquis Monaldo Granieri Solaro is a wise man and ironic, who knows a lot about life. Its only flaw is that he squandered the entire fortune at the gaming tables, thus making it impossible to provide a stable future with his wife and daughters. He has a lot of respect for Martino, first as a man and then as a son, to the point of defending it even before the most serious charges. The more difficult it is instead accept Alessandro, the husband of Constanza minor daughter, which, however, will learn to trust enough to ask him for help in defending the honor of his daughter in front of Fulvio Gritti harassment.
- Marchesa Olga Benucci Granieri Solaro | Monaldo's wife, mother of Vittoria and Costanza and mother-in-law of Martino, Olga is a very caring woman to the image of his own family. It is not an evil woman, but often puts the good name of the family with everything else, risking sometimes not to see the important things. Will she, unwittingly, to prevent someone's daughter Costanza by the intention to denounce the harassment suffered by Fulvio Gritti. However, only later prove to have at heart the interest of the daughters.
- Marchesina Costanza Granieri Solaro (Alessandra Barzaghi) | Second child of Monaldo and Olga, and younger sister Victoria, Constance is a simple and gentle girl, who over the years have learned to be content with what life has to offer her. Contrary to the older sister he never wanted a lavish wedding or a rich husband, but only love, which finds in shyness and awkwardness of Count Alessandro Sturani, best friend of Martin. Sweet and submissive, accepting without really want to pose for Fulvio Gritti, the painter husband of Emilia, who first molest and then try to use them violence, turbandola deeply. He will attempt to dissuade his father from challenging to a duel the artist, certain of losing a parent.
- Conte Alessandro Sturani | Clumsy, simple and unpredictable, Alessandro is a noble country, just like Martino, which is linked by a friendship very deep. Shy and prisoner of his own clumsiness, Alessandro is a clumsy man from whom all keep their distance, especially the women. The only one to see beyond appearances is Constanza, who falls in love with him for his simplicity and his good character. With the passage of time will prove to be Alessandro become more mature and even more courageous, and when Martino will help to counter the injustices of Loya and when will replace Monaldo in the duel to defend the honor of his beloved Costanza. Will he, in the course of the duel, mortally wounding Fulvio, making Emilia widow.
- Fulvio Gritti | Selfish, vulgar, crude and unstable, Fulvio is the husband of Emilia, florentine painter of great talent but little fame. On more than one occasion shown not withstand Rivombrosa nor those who live there, but his mood did not improve even with the transfer to Turin. He treats his wife coldly, often resulting in violent, almost sadistic, against him : Emilia does not love nor respect, coming several times to humiliate and psychologically reduce it into pieces. With the passage of time his mental state worse, compromised even by drug abuse, to push him to groped a rape against Costanza. It will be killed by Alessandro, regularly in self-defense, after discovering the unexpected pregnancy of the wife by the same, determined not to submit more to his game.
- Aldo Corsini | French army lieutenant, is the second of the Loya captain. Upright and honest man, from the beginning not at all bears the upper behavior. He begins to rebel only after knowing Dorina Rivalta, waitress Agnes Countess, which falls madly in love, reciprocated. Although at the beginning does not contradict never Loya, with the passage of time proves to be a brave man, ready to do anything to support the ideals in which he has always believed. With the death of Loya he receives his appointment as captain, and once brought peace to Rivombrosa can realize his dream of love with Dorina, with a peaceful coexistence between Italian and French soldiers.
- Dorina Rivalta | Sister less than Primo Rivalta, Dorina lends itself to Rivombrosa years service. Sweet, honest and willing, Dorina has not dreamed big, but the meeting with Lieutenant Aldo Corsini changes the cards on the table, pushing it to believe in the power of love. Opposed by his brother, who has a strong prejudice against the French, Dorina is several times less than the fraternal prohibitions, convinced (rightly) that his love will go far.
- Primo Rivalta | Elder brother of Dorina Rivalta, Prime is the factor of Conte Martino Ristori di Rivombrosa. It has a relationship with Teresa, a peasant who later became the personal maid of Victoria, has a strong prejudice against the French, who considers inferior to dogs. He repeatedly come up against Lieutenant Corsini, trying to prevent his sister meetings, but will have to surrender when he will understand that it is not Corsini Loya, and wants only the good of Rivombrosa. While remaining in Rivombrosa, it will become part of the band of Sparrowhawk, often helping him in his missions.
- Saval | Sergeant, then lower grade to Lieutenant Corsini, who respects but can not stand, Saval is a shameful and dishonest man like Loya, with whom he often plot in the shadows. Rarely shows respect, least of all humanity. Often it proves ready for anything and devoid of any moral scruples. You do not know his fate after the death of the Loya captain and was promoted to captain Corsini, but surely will be enslaved by Aldo, it will order not to give the most trouble to the people of the place. The actor who plays the Saval Sergeant, Francis Bolo Rossini, had already appeared in Elisa di Rivombrosa - Part two in a minor role.
- Frate Quirino | Friar Quirino is the priest of Rivombrosa. Soft-spoken, gentle and wise, is always willing to help their neighbors and to defend them against sorprusi of the strongest. Often helps the Sparviero (Hawk) and his team to bring a bit 'of justice to Rivombrosa.
- Jacopo | Valet of the Marquis Andrea Van Necker, Jacopo is from these treated as an equal, as a friend. Ironic, wise, honest and loyal, Jacopo supports Andrea in every battle, the struggle as the Hawk waged war with Loya to obtain the right to love Agnes. Caught by Loya, it is brutally tortured by Saval up to reveal the plans of Andrea, in that moment fleeing to Venice along with Agnes. Andrea will try to help to escape to cancel his guilt, discovering he was forgiven from the start. He will die in the seventh episode killed by Loya, trying to defend Andrea while trying to escape.

== See also ==
- Elisa di Rivombrosa
- List of Italian television series
