= Mario Nardone =

- Born: 8 May 1915; Pietradefusi, Italy
- Died: 1 July 1986; Milan, Italy
- Occupation: Police officer

Mario Nardone (8 May 1915 – July 1, 1986) was an Italian police officer. He was born in the town of Pietradefusi in southern Italy, but in 1946 he transferred to Milan where he became a celebrated public figure solving a number of high-profile cases.

== Popular culture ==
In 2012 Nardone's story served as the basis for a twelve-part Italian television series Inspector Nardone in which he was played by the actor Sergio Assisi.
