= Nightwatchman (film) =

2000 film directed by Francesco Calogero

- Directed by: Francesco Calogero
- Written by: Umberto Contarello; Francesco Calogero
- Cinematography: Giulio Pietromarchi
- Release date: 2000
- Country: Italy

Nightwatchman (Italian: Metronotte) is a 2000 Italian thriller-drama film directed by Francesco Calogero.

== Plot ==
Paolo Torregiani is a night watchman who has been working in Lucca for twenty years in a security agency. After a violent argument with his colleague Alcide, he tries to make peace but he finds him in a puddle of blood, hit by a bullet in the abdomen, inside a shoe factory where he was guarding. It is a place that Paolo knows well because Oscar, the owner, lives in the same complex with his Russian wife Nadia. Since Daria left him, Paolo began to invade Nadia and spend part of the night next to her windows. That night, by chance, Paul can talk to her, as she accompanies her to search for the husband who is not aware of the incident. Nadia is upset: she tells Paolo a confused story, tells of a brother, Dimitri, to whom she would hide her new life in Italy including the wedding with Oscar. Dimitri spent a few years in jail and now seems to be coming to Italy, perhaps upset to have been kept unaware. Nadia does not dare to reveal this story to Oscar and fears that Dimitri may be involved in the events of that night; then she asks Paolo to protect her and keep Dimitri under control in case she meets him. From that moment on, Paolo starts to split between the episode about his colleague and this 'assignment' that allows him to stay close to the woman he wants. The events lead him to discover that Dimitri is not the brother but Nadia's lover. Gettin in the house of Russo, a colleague, Paul realizes that he has a standard of living above normal, and then the truth emerges: Russo, Oscar and another nightwatchman were in collusion, Alcide blackmailed Russo who killed him.

== Cast ==
- Diego Abatantuono: Paolo Torregiani
- Marco Messeri: Pasquale Riani
- Anna Safroncik: Nadia Lecetti
- Andrei Klimenko: Dimitri
- Flavio Insinna: Salvatore Russo
- Nini Salerno: Pietro Della Santa
- Antonella Ponziani: Daria
- Ugo Conti: Oscar Lecetti
