= Lucrezia Lante della Rovere =

Italian actress (born 1966)

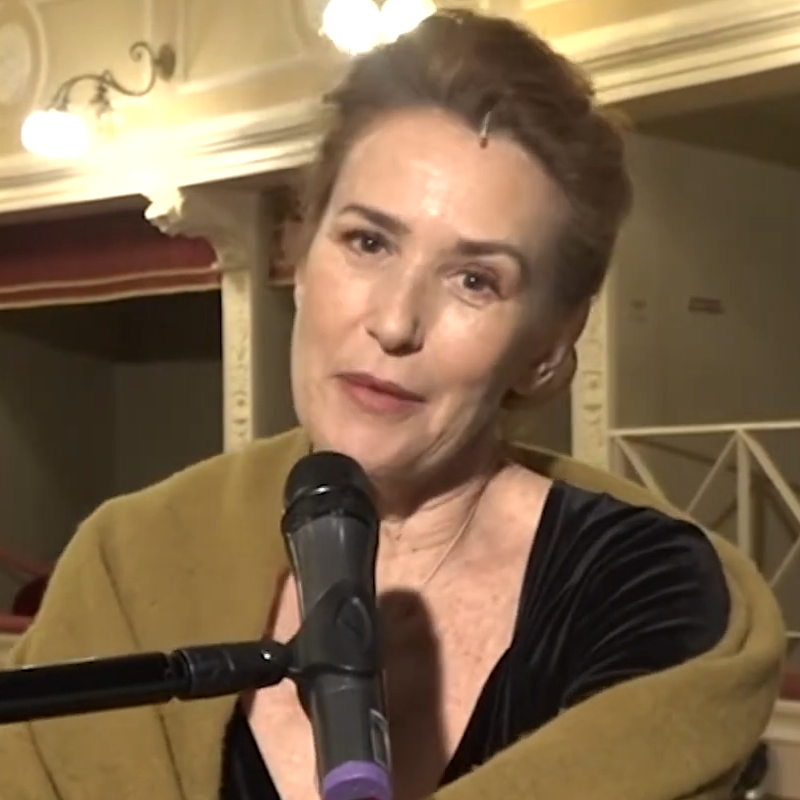
- della Rovere in 2022
- Born: 19 July 1966 (age 60); Rome, Italy
- Occupation: Actress
- Partner(s): Giovanni Malagò; Luca Barbareschi; Gianpaolo Tescari; Marco Tirelli; Emiliano Liuzzi
- Children: Ludovica Malagò; Vittoria Malagò

Lucrezia Lante della Rovere (Italian: [luˈkrɛttsja ˈlante della ˈroːvere]; born 19 July 1966) is an Italian film, television and theatre actress, who made her debut in Mario Monicelli's Speriamo che sia femmina (1986), where she acted along with Catherine Deneuve, Stefania Sandrelli, Giuliana De Sio, Giuliano Gemma, Bernard Blier, Philippe Noiret and Paolo Hendel.

== Early life ==
Della Rovere was born on in Rome, Italy, as Donna Lucrezia Lante Montefeltro della Rovere. She is the daughter of Alessandro Lante della Rovere (1936–1995) and Marina Ripa di Meana (born as Maria Elide Punturieri) (1941–2018), and descends from Lorenzo de' Medici and Federico da Montefeltro. She studied for one year in the American Overseas School of Rome.

== Career ==
Della Rovere has performed in many stage productions, such as Quando eravamo repressi by Pino Quartullo, Risiko by Francesco Apolloni, Oleanna and Il cielo sopra il letto by Luca Barbareschi, Malamore by Concita De Gregorio, John Gabriel Borkman by Henrik Ibsen and Come tu mi vuoi by Luigi Pirandello.

She also acted in television dramas such as Orgoglio, Uno di Noi, Donna Detective, Tutti pazzi per amore, Tutta la musica del cuore, La dama velata.

In 2005 she won the Taormina Film Festival for her role in the film Gli occhi dell'altro, in 2008 she won the Roma Fiction Fest for the role in the TV movie Ovunque tu sia, in 2012 she won Premio Flaiano for Malamore.

In 2008, della Rovere appeared in the James Bond film Quantum of Solace as Gemma, René Mathis' girlfriend.

== Private life ==
Della Rovere has twin daughters, Ludovica and Vittoria, born in 1988 with the entrepreneur Giovanni Malagò. She was companion of the actor Luca Barbareschi and was later linked to film director Gianpaolo Tescari and painter Marco Tirelli.

She is an atheist.

== Filmography ==
=== Films ===
- Let's Hope It's a Girl, directed by Mario Monicelli (1986)
- Delitti e profumi, directed by Vittorio De Sisti (1988)
- The Story of Boys & Girls, directed by Pupi Avati (1989)
- Panama Sugar, directed by Marcello Avallone (1990)
- Breath of Life, directed by Beppe Cino (1990)
- Tre colonne in cronaca, directed by Carlo Vanzina (1990)
- Per quel viaggio in Sicilia, directed by Egidio Termine (1991)
- When We Were Repressed, directed by Pino Quartullo (1992)
- Nessuno, directed by Francesco Calogero (1992)
- Lettera da Parigi, directed by Ugo Fabrizio Giordani (1992)
- Zuppa di pesce, directed by Fiorella Infascelli (1992)
- Voyage à Rome, directed by Michel Lengliney (1992)
- Women Don't Want To, directed by Pino Quartullo (1993)
- Bits and Pieces, directed by Antonio Luigi Grimaldi (1995)
- Ardena, directed by Luca Barbareschi (1997)
- La Carbonara, directed by Luigi Magni (2000)
- La repubblica di San Gennaro, directed by Massimo Costa (2003)
- Gli occhi dell'altro, directed by Gianpaolo Tescari (2005)
- SMS - Sotto mentite spoglie, directed by Vincenzo Salemme (2007)
- Quantum of Solace, directed by Marc Forster (2008)
- Purple Sea, directed by Donatella Maiorca (2009)
- Blessed Madness, directed by Carlo Verdone (2018)
- Flaminia, directed by Michela Giraud (2024)

=== Television ===
- Quando ancora non c'erano i Beatles, directed by Marcello Aliprandi - TV Miniseries(1988)
- La famiglia Ricordi, directed by Mauro Bolognini - TV Miniseries (1995)
- Uno di noi, directed by Fabrizio Costa - TV Miniseries (1996)
- Les amants de rivière rouge, directed by Yves Boisset - TV Miniseries (1996)
- Trenta righe per un delitto, directed by Lodovico Gasparini - TV Miniseries (1998)
- Cronaca nera, directed by Gianluigi Calderone and Ugo Fabrizio Giordani - TV Miniseries (1998)
- Il lato oscuro, directed by Gianpaolo Tescari - TV Miniseries (2002)
- Orgoglio, directed by Giorgio Serafini e Vittorio De Sisti - TV Series (2004)
- Attenti a quei tre, directed by Rossella Izzo - TV Miniseries (2004)
- Nebbie e delitti, directed by Riccardo Donna - TV Miniseries - Episode: L'affittacamere (2005)
- Giorni da Leone 2, directed by Francesco Barilli - TV Miniseries (2006)
- Lo smemorato di Collegno, directed by Maurizio Zaccaro - TV Miniseries (2009)
- Donna detective, directed by Cinzia TH Torrini - TV Miniseries (2007)
- Donna detective 2, directed by Fabrizio Costa - TV Miniseries (2010)
- Tutti pazzi per amore 3, directed by Laura Muscardin- TV Series (2011)
- Il sogno del maratoneta, directed by Leone Pompucci - TV Miniseries (2012)
- Una musica silenziosa, directed by Ambrogio Lo Giudice - TV Miniseries (2012)
- La dama velata, directed by Carmine Elia - TV Miniseries (2015)
