= Elisa di Rivombrosa =

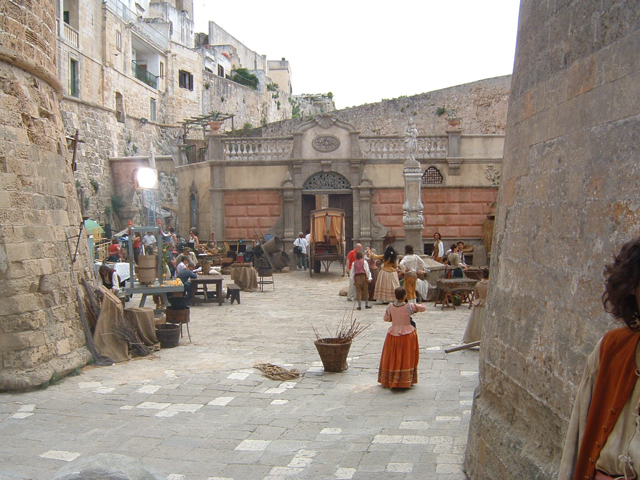
- A set in Otranto of the second season (2005)
- Genre: Period drama
- Written by: Marco Alessi, Piero Bodrato
- Directed by: Cinzia Th. Torrini
- Starring: Vittoria Puccini; Alessandro Preziosi; Antonella Fattori; Jane Alexander; Luca Ward; Cesare Bocci; Pierluigi Coppola; Marzia Ubaldi; Sabrina Sirchia; Eleonora Mazzoni; Antonino Iuorio; Kaspar Capparoni; Francesca Rettondini; Giovanna Rei; Enrico Beruschi; Elio Pandolfi; Marina Giordana; Vittorio Viviani; Antonio Salines; Philippe Leroy; Linda Batista; Regina Bianchi; Riccardo Sicardi; Carlotta Previati; Antonio Cupo; Giovanni Guidelli; Raffele Balzo; Sergio Assisi; Fiorenza Marchegiani; Stefano Quatrosi; Caterina Pace; Micol Santilli; Sarah Felberbaum; Giulio Berruti; Giorgio Borghetti
- Music by: Savio Riccardi
- Country of origin: Italy
- No. of seasons: 2
- No. of episodes: 26

Production
- Producer: Guido and Maurizio De Angelis
- Camera setup: Roberto Cimatti, Giuliano Giustini, Alessandro Pesci

Original release
- Network: Canale 5
- Release: 17 December 2003 – December 1, 2005

Elisa di Rivombrosa is an Italian television series (partly inspired by the 1740 novel Pamela, or Virtue Rewarded) about a love story in 18th century Italy between Fabrizio Ristori, a young Italian Count, and his mother's maid, Elisa. It was broadcast on Mediaset for two seasons from 2003 to 2005.

This series is followed by a spin-off called La figlia di Elisa – Ritorno a Rivombrosa (2007), which takes place in 1797 and focuses on Elisa's daughter Agnese Ristori.

== Cast ==
- Vittoria Puccini: Elisa Scalzi Ristori - Countess di Rivombrosa
- Alessandro Preziosi: Fabrizio Federico Giovanni Clemente Ristori
- Antonella Fattori: Anna Ristori di Radicati / Anna Ristori di Ceppi
- Jane Alexander: Lucrezia Van Necker Beauville
- Kaspar Capparoni: Giulio Drago
- Pierluigi Coppola: Angelo Buondio
- Luca Ward: Ottavio Ranieri
- Cesare Bocci: Antonio Ceppi
- Antonino Iuorio: Alvise Radicati
- Linda Batista: Isabella
- Regina Bianchi: Agnese Ristori madre
- Luis Molteni: Don Tognino
- Elio Pandolfi: Abate Van Necker
- Philippe Leroy: Carlo Emanuele III
- Francesca Rettondini: Clelia Bussani
- Eleonora Mazzoni: Margherita Maffei
- Giovanna Rei: Betta Maffei
- Marzia Ubaldi: Amelia
- Emanuela Garuccio: Celeste
- Antonio Salines: Jean Luc Beauville
- Pamela Saino: Orsolina Scalzi
- Giovanni Guidelli: Victor Benac
- Raffaello Balzo: Armand Benac
- Antonio Cupo: Christian Grey
- Elena Russo: Rossana Chevalier
- Marco Leonardi: Gaetano Capece
- Fiorenza Marchegiani: Cristina di Conegliano
- Sergio Assisi: Nicola di Conegliano
- Tommaso Ragno: Vittorio Amedeo III
- Monica Scattini: Eugenia Bonomi

== Episodes ==
Season 1

=== Episodes 1 - 7 ===
Piemonte, Italy, 1769. Elisa Scalzi is a poor but beautiful and determined young lady, who pleasantly takes care of the old Countess Agnese Ristori of Rivombrosa. Anna Ristori, Agnese's daughter, is jealous of the privileged relationship Elisa has with the countess (who took her at her service as her lady companion although Elisa was only a maid). The Countess's health gets worse and she keeps expressing her desire to see her son, the charming Count Fabrizio Ristori, who has been enlisted in the French army for the past 10 years. Elisa decides to communicate the Countess' desire to see Fabrizio, so she writes him a letter and signs herself as "Elisa di Rivombrosa" . As soon as Fabrizio gets her letter, he decides to come back home. Before leaving, he's asked to deliver some important and confidential documents to a friend, Capitano Lombardi, who would be waiting for him on the way home. When the two friends meet, they're ambushed by a group of soldiers, sent by Duke Ottavio Ranieri, an evil and influent aristocrat and Commander of the Guard of his Majesty the King, who wants to steal these precious documents in order to save himself and several other plotting nobles from prison and death penalty.
Although Fabrizio manages to chase the killers away, Captain Lombardi is seriously injured. Just before dying, he hands Fabrizio the documents and asks him to personally deliver them to King Carlo Emanuele III.
Fabrizio then goes home to the beautiful Estate of Rivombrosa, where everyone is pleased to see him after so long. When he meets Elisa, he's amazed by her beauty. Not knowing she's a maidservant, he mistakes "Elisa di Rivombrosa" for an aristocrat because she's smart and well educated. He tries to seduce her, and Elisa realises she's seriously falling for him.
Fabrizio shocks everyone - his sister Anna and all the other nobles, well aware of the girl's un-aristocratic conditions - when he dares invite Elisa to dance with him at a ball in honour of his return. The ball is interrupted by Dr. Antonio Ceppi, a former noble man who lost all of his properties and his title after getting married with Lucia, a servant girl. He's seriously worried about his wife, who can't be found, and asks the nobles to help him. The Count, against everyone's will, decides to help Antonio to look for his wife. Lucia is found dead in the lake: she committed suicide because she felt responsible for her husband's social downfall and wanted him to be happy and accepted by the Upper class.
Her desperate action makes Elisa confess her social position to Fabrizio, who really gets mad at her. He starts to treat her roughly and rudely, trying several times to take advantage of her. He even ends up locking her in a cellar, in order to subdue her. When his mother is about to die, he releases Elisa. Countess Agnese Ristori, who really loves the young girl, asks her son to take care of her. After the death of the Countess, Elisa, still traumatized by Fabrizio's behaviour, decides to leave Rivombrosa and find a job somewhere else. The Count, however, doesn't want to give up on the girl and persuades all the aristocrats in the neighbourhood not to hire her. Because of this, Elisa decides to go back to the village, to live with her mother and sister. On the way home, she is attacked by the drunken Count Giulio Drago (Fabrizio's best friend). Elisa hits him with a stone and ends up in prison. When Fabrizio is informed of it, he first tries to convince his friend Giulio to remove the charges against Elisa. When his friend refuses to do so, Fabrizio goes to Turin to ask the king for Elisa's grace in exchange for the confidential documents.
When he's about to give them to Duke Ranieri, he understands that the duke is the one who once tried to steal them. With an excuse, Fabrizio takes Elisa's grace and runs away from Turin. Those documents, in fact, could be very compromising for a number of nobles: they're a list of the king's conspirators.
Meanwhile, Elisa, still in prison, meets the young witch Celeste, who becomes a good friend of hers. Count Giulio Drago knows that Fabrizio really cares about Elisa, and he finally decides to go and remove charges from her, telling her he does it because his friend asked him to. When Fabrizio finally arrives in Rivombrosa, he finds out that Elisa is already out of prison and safe. When she comes thank the Count for his gesture, she decides with Fabrizio's approval to start working again at the Estate of Rivombrosa as a governess for Emilia, Fabrizio's niece and Anna's daughter.
Fabrizio and Elisa are now getting closer and closer, and they're both falling in love with each other. The problem, however, is Elisa's social condition. Because of that, in fact, they can't get married. Giulio Drago convinces Fabrizio to make her marry Angelo Buondio, a sweet servant boy who's always been in love with her, in order to make her become his mistress.
Disgusted by the proposal, Elisa firmly refuses. Fabrizio declares his love for her in the garden, in front of all the servants, and explains that this is the only way possible for him to stay with her. In that moment, the carriage of the marchioness Lucrezia Van Necker, Fabrizio's former lover, arrives and the count tries to make Elisa jealous by flirting with the marchioness in front of her.
Lucrezia is a beautiful but cruel aristocrat woman and, together with her lover, the duke Ranieri, is one of the conspirators who longs for the king's death. After Fabrizio's attempts with Lucrezia, Elisa decides to accept Angelo's marriage proposal but still refuses to become the count's mistress.

=== Episode 8 ===
After deciding to marry Angelo, Elisa is getting ready for the wedding. Fabrizio is hurt by the girl's decision and, feeling like he lost her forever, he decides to leave for Turin with Lucrezia, who offers to help him deliver the documents to the king.
Fabrizio thinks that the woman's husband, the king's counselor, Marquise Bouville, is involved in the conspiracy. What he doesn't know is that the name written on the list is Lucrezia's, and not her husband's. In fact, she's plotting to help her lover steal the documents by misleading the Count Ristori : when he arrives in Turin, Fabrizio is captured. He manages to escape but gets hurt and falls into a river. Meanwhile, Elisa, who's about to get married, remembers Fabrizio's words and his declarations of love, and runs away from the church, leaving a heart-broken Angelo at the altar.

=== Episode 9 ===
After escaping from her wedding, Elisa returns to Rivombrosa, where she is now avoided by everyone. The girl tries to apologize to Angelo but he's so hurt that he can't even talk to her and decides to leave Rivombrosa forever. Elisa returns to her mother's house.
Fabrizio, wounded, is rescued by two fishermen and is then taken back to Rivombrosa by Celeste, Elisa's friend from prison, who recognised him. His health condition is critical. While Dr. Ceppi tries his best to save him, Fabrizio asks for Elisa. Meanwhile, Celeste goes warn Elisa about Fabrizio's state, and the girl runs to the Count's Estate to be at his side.
Once Elisa reaches him, he asks her to hide the documents somewhere safe. The girl is a little confused by his request, but still grants his wish, and hides the conspirators' list between the endpapers of Countess Agnese Ristori's favourite book.

=== Episode 10 ===
Fabrizio is getting better and Elisa and him can't deny their feelings anymore. Count's sister Anna is very worried and refuses to accept this socially dishonourable relationship. When Lucrezia comes to visit Fabrizio, Anna explains all her worries to the marchioness.
Giulio Drago is one of the conspirators, and as soon as he's informed that Duke Ranieri tried to hurt his friend, he argues with Lucrezia and the Duke, and leaves the conspirators' meeting in which they plot to attack the king.
Meanwhile, Count Ristori is so in love with young Elisa that he even starts thinking about a possible marriage, which would eventually make him lose his title. His friend Giulio, though, makes him think about Antonio Ceppi's condition and how his marriage ended, and Fabrizio gives up his idea.
He is then recalled up to the army. He does not want to leave Rivombrosa because he doesn't want to leave Elisa, but when the girl still refuses to be his mistress, he lets her go, and leaves. Elisa soon realizes she made a mistake and chases him, and the two end up making love.

=== Episode 11 ===
The next morning, Anna bursts into her brother's bedroom and finds out Elisa is in bed with him. Count Giulio Drago asks for Margherita Maffei's hand, a marchioness he's in love with and Elisa's good friend. Margherita's father, however, is forced to refuse his proposal because, due to a bad investment, he has lost all his properties, and he can't provide an appropriate dowry for his daughter.
Rumors of Elisa's love affair with Count Fabrizio reach everyone's ears, including Elisa's mother's, who refuses to talk to her. Elisa is upset but Fabrizio comforts her. The two lovers decide to get married secretly in Rivombrosa and ask Father Tognino to celebrate the ceremony. The old man accepts, but the Abbot Van Neker, disconcerted about such a wedding between a noble man and a maidservant, decides to warn his cousin, the marchioness Lucrezia. The jealous woman, still in love with Fabrizio, has Father Tognino killed. The Father is found dead in the church by Fabrizio and Elisa, right before their wedding.

=== Episode 12 ===
Fabrizio receives a proposal from Duke Ranieri to join the conspiration. Fabrizio refuses, and the Duke tries to find out more about the documents: his guards, disguised as servants, pay the servant girl Bianca for information and she tells them to question Elisa. During the play performed by a traveling theatrical troupe in Rivombrosa, which all the nobles attend, two of the Duke's men attack Elisa in order to get information about the documents. She is saved by the arrival of Fabrizio, who fights and kills them. Ludovico Maffei attempts suicide by poisoning himself, overwhelmed by the responsibility of having ruined his daughters lives. Margherita and Dr. Ceppi find him and try to save him. Anna, who still cannot accept the love between Fabrizio and Elisa, goes to Turin to ask her friend, the beautiful Duchess Clelia Bussani, to try to seduce her brother.

=== Episode 13 ===
Clelia, Anna's friend and the King's cousin, arrives at Rivombrosa and Fabrizio decides to go back to Turin with her, hoping to meet the king there and warn him on the conspiracy. Clelia and Fabrizio get along quite well but Fabrizio remains faithful to Elisa. Marquis Maffei, still sick from the poison he took, raves of the conspiracy to Margherita, who goes to Rivombrosa telling what she's heard. Unfortunately Fabrizio is not in the palace, so Margherita tells everything to Elisa. On the next day, Elisa goes to Turin to warn Fabrizio, and everything happens very fast. The Count is waiting with Clelia for the king, in her carriage. Seeing the barrel of a gun at a window, he runs to prevent the killer from shooting the king, while Elisa yells to warn the king's guards. Angelo, who now serves in the Royal Guard is badly injured when he tries to protect the king from the shooting. Fabrizio, who did not manage to catch the killer, has to flee to avoid being caught because it looks as though he was the one who tried to shoot the king. Clelia hides him in her carriage and Elisa and Fabrizio return to Rivombrosa together. Elisa is still feeling sick and weak and Amelia starts to think that she could be pregnant.

=== Episode 14 ===
Elisa notices that a little orphan boy, Martino has a birth mark on his shoulder similar to that which is on Fabrizio's shoulder. Along with Amelia they come to the conclusion that the orphan is the result of a dissolute life he led after leaving Lucrezia van Necker 10 years ago. Elisa tells her observations to Fabrizio and accuses him of not caring about his son. Therefore, Fabrizio goes to buy Martino free and takes him to work in the stables. Finally, Elisa tells Fabrizio that she is pregnant. This makes the Count to decide not to expose their common happiness to any more risks and wants to return the list to Count Drago. Elisa tells him that whatever he does will be right and tells that she and their unborn baby will wait for him. Meanwhile, Anna's husband Fabrizio plans to incapacitate and take over the property. They organize a special dinner, in which van Necker and other nobles are invited to confirm that Fabrizio is crazy since he wants to marry a servant. Fabrizio understands what's going on and takes the opportunity to propose to Elisa. She runs away when she sees the nobles' faces.

=== Episode 15 ===
Fabrizio resolves to never again hide their feelings and views. He wants to marry Elisa and let everybody know that he loves her. The wedding arrangements start at the Palace. Initially reluctant abbot van Necker agrees to marry them in the condition, however, that the bride and groom must find the two witnesses for the marriage. The Marquis Maffei for fear of reprisals refuses. Ceppi and Giulio agree to be the witnesses. Anna goes to Lucretia for help. The nobles arrive to the wedding ceremony but in the middle of it they all turn away from the young to mark their protest, only Clelia remains in place. By showing that she accepts their relationship.

=== Episode 16 ===
Fabrizio drives his sister Anna away from Rivombrosa after guessing that she was responsible for what happened at his and Elisa's wedding. Exiled Anna moves out of the palace with her husband, and is forced to share their new place with his lover - Betta Maffei. Fabrizio swears revenge against all the enemies of Elisa. The only aristocracy, who shows their support for them is Lucrezia van Necker, who actually has her own good at stake too. Elisa does not trust her, and her care grows when he learns that Lucrezia and Fabriozo were lovers in the past. Margeritha Maffei enters the convent, according to the promise she made to God. Meanwhile Lucrezia invites Fabrizio and Elisa to dinner with other nobles. During this dinner Lucrezia sends men to Rivombrosa in order to steal the list. But Elisa is not feeling too well and along with Fabrizio they return to Rivombrosa early. At night, Lucrezia's men come to Rivombrosa after bribing Bianca to lead them to the library. Along the way they kill one of the farmhands, that Martino finds and rushes to Fabrizio and Elisa's bedroom to tell what he has seen. The men can't find the list and set the library on fire. At the same moment there enters Fabrizio, who kills the two thugs. Unfortunately, the third one escapes. Concerned about the prolonged absence of Fabrizio and about the noises she hears, Elisa leaves the bedroom with a knife. Unfortunately she comes across with the man who escaped and fatally wounds him with the knife. The man falls down the stairs taking Elisa with him. Fabrizio finds Elisa and cries over worry for his beloved and the fate of their child.

=== Episode 17 ===
Elisa after falling down stairs loses her child. Her condition is critical. Fabrizio calls her mother and sister to Rivombrosa. Lucrezia also offers her assistance insidiously. At the news of the attack on the palace Angelo returns to Rivombrosa, asking Fabrizio to rejoin his service. The Count trust him implicitly and entrusts to his care the safety of the occupants. He does not know that Angelo is a spy adviser of the king - Beuville and is detected, what is involved in the conspiracy count.

=== Episode 18 ===
According to Dr Ceppi due to the fall and the abortion Elisa will remain infertile causing Elisa to suffer from depression. The doctor also warns Fabrizo that because of that she might commit suicide. When Elisa disappears one night, and the search does not yield results, Fabrizo gives way to despair. At the Radicati Palace Alvise and his mistress Betta are celebrating yet another party. Two of the guests who are heavily drunk leave the main party room wandering through the palace eventually entering Emilia's bedroom. Anna comes to rescue her in time and tells Alvise she will return to Rivombrosa taking Emilia with her immediately. Fabrizo finds Elisa in the monastery Margherita Maffei lives in finding out she left because she didn't want to condemn him to a childless life. With a little help from Anna Elisa can be convinced to return to Rivombrosa. Lucrezia overhears the story of Martino and learns that his father is Fabrizio. In order to get closer to Fabrizio she convinces everyone that she is the mother of the boy. She claims that she bore a child before marriage with the Marquis Beuville, but her mother told her that the boy was born dead. Meanwhile, the inn has been planted. Now, Lucrezia wants to get the boy and make him a page to her. For Elisa, who has motherly feelings towards Martino the news is a huge blow, but she does not deny Lucrezia the right to take "her" child with her.

=== Episode 19 ===
Lucretia takes Martino with her, making him a page to her. Fabrizo longing for the boy, often visits him in the awning, which does not like the Elisie. Elisa saw that Fabrizo approached the marquee, decides to move out of Rivombrosa. The Marquis returns to the mansion Beuville, who does not like that Fabrizo is a frequent guest of his wife. Marquis collects information on the Count Ristori, and provides it to Angelo. Giulio distraught after the loss of Margherita, Elisa asks that gave her an engagement ring. At the time of Count Drago vows he tries to interrupt the ceremony, but Ristroi him back. Then Margherita Elisie confesses that interfere with its meticulously Lucretia and the count in the marriage.

=== Episode 20 ===
Fabrizio not believe the Elisa's accusations are true: that Lucretia is faking under the guise of a false friendship. Then Fabrizio being angry goes to Lucrezia asking her to give explanation; then Lucrezia openly professes his love to him, capturing him entirely off guard. Then in a fit of passion he kisses her, but then runs away. Meanwhile, Elisa saw that Fabrizo awning can be wrapped around your finger, asks him to make a choice: it either Lucrezia. Count selects Elisa. The girl is not ready to give up her lover, goes to the awning, to speak with her. Lucretia tells her about the kiss and promises to fight for Fabriza. Small Martino very long for Elise and is able to forgive her putting it into the house Lucretia. Awning with Prince Ranieri decide as soon as possible to recover the list of conspirators. With the mission to send the broken Rivombrosy Count Drago. He asks Fabriza bed so he can ease the pain of losing Margherita. At night went to the library to find out. Elisa and Fabrizo hear the roar of the library, also there's going. Giulio covered with by them, giving a list of demands. Count refuses and comes to a duel. When Fabrizo puts him in a critical position, Count Drago killed himself with his sword Fabriza. Giulio last wish is to see Margherita before his death. On the way to her, trying to guide the Count Drago Fabrizio that this Lucretia is the heads of the conspiracy, and not her husband. Count Drago Margherita dies in his arms.

=== Episode 21 ===
Lucrezia decides to kill Elisa, because it is the only obstacle to her happiness with Fabrizio and to the top of power. Lucrezia asks Isabella to prick Elisa with a poisoned rose at the funeral of Count Drago. Meanwhile, Lucrezia goes to Martino, who has fever, but he calls Elisa. At Rivombrosa, the commander comes to ask Fabrizio to testify about the death of Giulio Drago. During the funeral, Isabella does not fully meet the order she received: she pricks to Elisa with the thorn of the rose, but the thorn was not poisoned. After the funeral, Elisa and Fabrizio go to the police station and testified that it was a duel and Giulio was killed by accident. Then Lucrezia discovers that Isabella did not fulfill its orders and kill her. Before his death, Isabella makes sure that Martino hears that Lucrezia is not the mother of Martin and reveals that his father is Fabrizo. In this situation, the boy decides to escape from the awning. When Lucretia realizes that the boy had disappeared, she sends the servants to catch him, ordering even shoot in his direction. She herself went to Rivombrosa, where is faking to be a worried mother. When entering the courtyard of the palace, Martino is attacked by people Lucretia, but he manages to survive the ambush. Martino tells to Fabrizio and Elisa what Lucrezia did (that Lucrezia is not his mother and she killed Isabella). Meanwhile, Angelo pretending to have a broken arm, scans the library, searching the list. He does not know that Count Fabrizio has placed the list in the Virgin Mary statue from the palace chapel. Fabrizio realizes that Angelo is looking for the list. During the confrontation reveals that he worked for the Marquis Beauville and is on the side of good. Fabrizio is stunned by the situation, remembering the last words of Giulio, realizes that all the time was wrong: that not the Marquis Beauville is the heads the conspiracy, but his wife - Lucrezia Van Necker Beauville.

=== Episode 22 ===
Fabrizio decides to immediately contact the Marquis Jean Luc Beauville, for this purpose went to his mansion, but didn't found him there. Lucrezia guesses that Fabrizio knows the truth and decides to go to Turin. Fabrizio also going to Turin, and close Elisa, who wants to go with him, in a room for her safety. Elisa, however, escapes and follows him to Turin. As a result, they go together to the capital. Unfortunately, Lucrezia anticipates their movement and notifies her husband that Fabrizio will give it the list and that he himself belongs to the conspiracy. During the meeting between Jean Luc Beauville and Fabrizio, appears Lucretia and kills her husband and throws all the blame on Fabrizio Ristori. Fabrizio is thrown into prison, although it is threaten him with death, refuses to give the list to Ranieri. Elisa tries in vain to see him. For this purpose, went to Margherita Maffei, which manages to get into prison. Then the nun goes to the king to convince him of the Count of innocence, but this remains inexorable. Process begins, Elisa dressed as a nun, watching the whole event. Count Ristori testify against Lucretia and Ranieri, accusing them of murder of Beauville and treason. Fabrizio talk about the list, but he don't have the list with him. He knows that if he give the list to the judge, soon Lucrezia and Ranieri will destroy the list. In this situation, Elisa went to Rivombrosa with Angelo and they searched in the library, but does not know that Fabrizio put the list elsewhere. Anna directs them that they may be in the palace chapel, unfortunately, this do not bring the expected search results. At Rivombrosa returns the husband of Anna, Alvise Radicati. He makes its own orders and requests to Elisa, such devotion as to Fabrizio. Meanwhile, in Turin, the process continue, as a result of testimony commander leading the investigation into the death of Giulio Drago, comes to light that it was thanks to Elisa, that investigation was discontinued. Therefore, the royal guard arrives at Rivombrosa and took with him the terrified Elisa.

=== Episode 23 ===
Elisa testifies before the court to release Fabrizio, but the judges deny her testimony, as the information reaches them that she is a maid in love with his master. Elisa returns to Rivombrosa, where Alvise Radicati has locked his wife in her room. Elisa steals the key from Alvise and persuades Anna that she must go to Turin and testify for his brother. Although Anna throws a whole new light on the death of the Marquis Beauville, judges remain unmoved. When the Alvise discovers that Anna is not in the room, he severely beats the little Martino, because he thinks that Martino stole the key. Fortunately, the boy is saved by Angelo who comes and attacks Alvise Radicati. In the morning, Dr. Antonio Ceppi arrives at Rivombrosa, who during wound care notes that Alvise has syphilis. Alvise forbids him to inform anyone about this. Then takes Betta Maffei to Turin, and joins the conspirators. Meanwhile, in prison, Ottavio Ranieri tries to persuade Fabrizio to give it the list. Count Fabrizio Ristori is found guilty and sentenced to be beheaded on 25 September 1769 years on the main square, in Rivombrosa. When Elisa learns about this, she takes matters into his own hands. Elisa threatens Lucretia.

=== Episode 24 ===
Duke Ottavio Ranieri promise to Fabrizio to release him if he will receive the list; but Fabrizio refuses him. Then Ranieri orders that Fabrizio to be whipped. Fabrizio refuses again to say where is the list. Meanwhile, Elisa tries to reach out to the only person who can trust in Turin, therefore she go to asking help to the cousin of the king - Clelia Bussani. She is constantly accompanied by her faithful Angelo. Elisa and Angelo arrives at her palace, but the road is packed with soldiers Ranieri. In the garden of palace, the two dogs of Ranieri bark against these them. To save Elisa, Angelo shoots one of them. Elisa, running, slips and injures her hand. However, they manage to get to the palace. The shots can be heard throughout the garden, which arouses suspicion of soldiers. Meanwhile, Elisa reaches in the palace of Clelia, who hides her in his chambers. Lucrezia find a handkerchief with the blazon and initials of Fabrizio Ristori, which was dropped by Elisa, so Lucrezia guessed that the girl is hidden by Clelia in her palace. Lucrezia and Ranieri make a plan to find the list and to kill Elisa; they decide to help Fabrizio to escape from prison so he can take the list from the hiding place and then they can recover it from him. Alvise Radicardi returns without Betta from Turin to Rivombrosa and introduces its own orders. Dr. Antonio Ceppi, worrying about Anne, arrives at the Rivombrosa to inform her about the health of her husband. But seeing her unhappy and worried, he decides to delay to say about her husband's illness. Betta comes to Rivombrosa apologizing to Alvise. Anna annoyed when she sees it, and wants to throw it out, but her husband forbids. This time the doctor Antonio Ceppi says to Anna about the Alvise's disease and shows her his love: they are kissing. Lucrezia decides to implement a plan to get rid of Elisa and to recovery the list. Lucrezia goes to Clelia and blackmail her to show where is hidden Elisa. Then Lucrezia convinces her to try to escape Fabrizio from prison, arguing that what she are doing, it for purely emotional, because Fabrizio Ristori was the only love of her life. Elisa with Clelia go to prison, where they manage to release Fabrizio. Angelo is waiting in the street with two horses for help them escape. Elisa, Fabrizio and Angelo manage to escape. Fabrizio don't wants to flee the country like a criminal, therefore he wants return to Rivombrosa to retrieve the list and forward it to the king.

=== Episode 25 ===
Elisa and Fabrizio come in the night. In the morning, along with Angelo they go to Rivombosa to take the list. When they enter in the courtyard, Elisa points out the open window in the library, and a lighted candle in the kitchen, which raised its alert. It turns out that this is an ambush. At the last minute Fabrizio informs Elisa, where he had hid the list and allows her to escape, he giving up. Terrified, she finds refuge in the house of Dr. Ceppi. Meanwhile, Fabrizio and Angelo are arrested and subjected to the cruelest torture. During the torture Angelo agrees to help Ranieri to recovery the list if he will be released. Ana tells Betta that Alvise is sick; then Betta packs his luggage and hurries from Rivombrosa. Elisa is hunted by Ranieri's men. Ana and Emilia leave from Rivombrosa to Ceppi's house, where they find Elisa. Elisa sends a letter to Cleila. Elisa and Ana return to Rivombrosa, enter in the chapel, Elisa finds the list and takes the list, then returns to dr. Ceppi. Fabrizio is visited in prison by Lucrezia, who tells him that she loves him, but his heart is only for Elisa. Clelia reads the letter, but her lady companion, Therese, goes and tells Ranieri about Elisa's letter. Clelia goes to the king to tell him that she will give him a gift before Fabrizio's execution. Meanwhile, in Turin, Ranieri try again to force Fabrizio to give him the list of conspirators. Ana tells Alvise that she shall move home to Antonio Ceppi; Alvise, being nervous, tries to squeeze her throat, but Ana hit him with a vase (bowl), then Alvise falls down. Then Ana leaves from Rivombrosa. Looking for Elisa, Angelo meets Anna, and they together go at Ceppi's house.

=== Episode 26 ===
Dr. Antonio Ceppi takes care of Angelo's wounds. The King tells Lucrezia that Fabrizio will be executed earlier, than was planning on. Betta is seriously ill, and she stays at home with her father and her sister. Ranieri tells Lucrezia to get away from his life forever. In the night, Elisa and Angelo write another letter and another list; they make a false copy similar to the original one. Elisa and Angelo come to the Turin. There in the square before the Bussani Palace they play a scene, Angelo "killing" Elisa and take her letters (with the fake list). Angelo takes a fake list and the pendant from the neck of Elisa and then give them to the Ranieri; but Angelo refuses to be paid. Ranieri goes to Fabrizio and tells him that Elisa is dead and gives him her pendant. Clelia takes Elisa in her palace; when Elisa feels safe, explains that what she saw in the square was a frame-up (sketch). Clelia do not realize that Therese is a spy of Ranieri. Therese go to Ranieri and says that he had received a false papers, because the genuine acts are at Clelia. When he discover of the betrayal of Clelia, he decides to kill her. In the night someone kills Clelia in her bed. Lucrezia decides to release Fabrizio and goes before the court and says that she and Fabrizio were lovers and that Fabrizio killed Jean Luc in a duel, for her. But Fabrizio denies and the court maintained the conviction. The next day, Fabrizio is brought to Rivombrosa, where in the main square, all the people are gathered together with the king and his new adviser - Ranieri. Clelia had promised the king that she would give him a gift before Fabrizio's execution, so the king is waiting for her. Meanwhile, Lucrezia rush in her chaise to Venezia, leaving the country. At Rivombrosa, at one moment, Clelia's carriage arrives. Elisa is disguised in Clelia, so she goes down from the carriage, and approaches the king. The king requests the guards to allow the women to approach. Elisa wants to give the letters to the king, but then Ranieri threatens the King and Elisa. Fabrizio uses the confusion and gets out from under ax. Follows the struggle between Fabrizio and Ranieri, and Elisa gives the king the list with conspirators. This he finds of the betrayal of his adviser, and sentence him to prison. Ranieri is arrested. Then, in the presence of all people, the King ennobles Elisa – he gives her the title of Countess. Elisa tells Fabrizio that she is pregnant. All people applaud and rejoice. For the two lovers it was a time of happiness and joy, gladness and honor. Now there is nothing left to prevent the marriage of Fabrizio and Elisa.

== See also ==
- La figlia di Elisa – Ritorno a Rivombrosa
- List of Italian television series
