= Rosalinda Celentano =

Italian actress

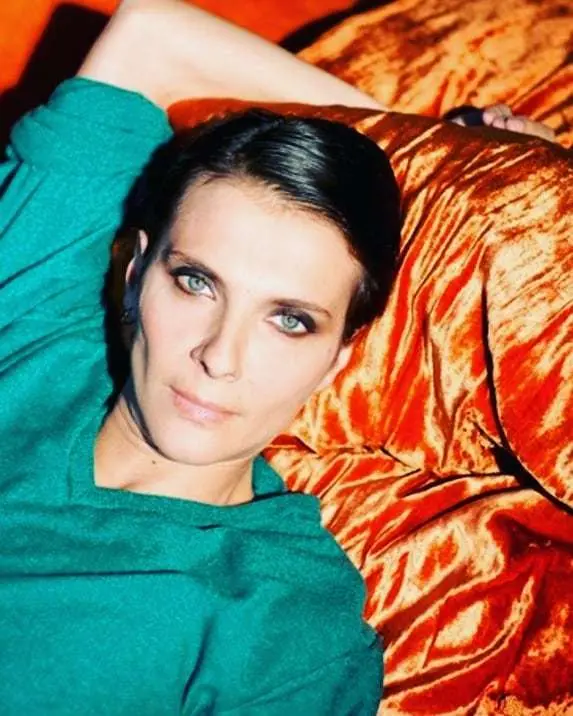
- Celentano in 2011
- Born: 15 July 1968 (age 57); Rome, Italy
- Occupation: Actress
- Height: 1.73 m (5 ft 8 in)
- Parent(s): Adriano Celentano (father); Claudia Mori (mother)

Rosalinda Celentano (born 15 July 1968) is an Italian actress. Credited in over twenty films, she is perhaps best known for having played Satan in the movie The Passion of the Christ (2004). She is the daughter of Adriano Celentano and Claudia Mori.

== Filmography ==
=== Film ===
Year	Title	Role(s)	Director	Notes
1988	Treno di panna	Miss Mellows' assistant	Andrea De Carlo	
1993	Women Don't Want To	Claudia	Pino Quartullo	
1995	Palermo – Milan One Way	Paola Terenzi	Claudio Fragasso	
1995	Marta Singapore	Ramon	Barbara Melega	Short film
1999	The Sweet Sounds of Life	Lolita	Giuseppe Bertolucci	
2001	Probably Love	Chiara	Giuseppe Bertolucci	
2001	Domenica	Nun	Wilma Labate	Cameo appearance
2002	Paz!	Gianna	Renato De Maria	
2002	Bell'amico	Laura	Luca D'Ascanio	
2003	Adored	Luna	Marco Filiberti	
2003	The Order	Rosalinda	Brian Helgeland	
2004	The Passion of the Christ	Satan	Mel Gibson	
2007	Tutte le donne della mia vita	Isabella	Simona Izzo	
2007	Seven Kilometers from Jerusalem	Sara	Claudio Malaponti	
2008	Il nostro Messia	Mara Roversi	Claudio Serughetti	
2013	Il ragioniere della mafia	Narcos	Federico Rizzo	
2019	Nati 2 volte	Valeria	Pierluigi di Lallo	

=== Television ===
Year	Title	Role(s)	Notes
1998	Una donna per amico	Giorgia	Episode: "Cara nonna, cara mamma"
2003	The Good Pope: Pope John XXIII	Teresa	Television film
2004	1200°	Patricia Scradi	Television film
2010	Il peccato e la vergogna	Maria Pia	4 episodes
