= Il commissario Manara =

- Genre: Police procedural
- Created by: Alberto Simone; Paolo Logli; Alessandro Pondi
- Starring: Guido Caprino; Roberta Giarrusso; Valeria Valeri; Anna Safroncik; Jane Alexander; Lucia Ocone; Augusto Fornari; Bruno Gambarotta; Mario Tribastone; Massimo Andrei; Luis Molteni; Francesco Quinn
- Country of origin: Italy
- Original language: Italian
- No. of seasons: 2
- No. of episodes: 24

Production
- Running time: 50 min. (episode)

Original release
- Network: Rai 1
- Release: January 8, 2009 – March 31, 2011

Il commissario Manara (Italian for 'Commissioner Manara') is an Italian police procedural television series. It is a spin-off from the 2005 series, Una famiglia in giallo (Italian for 'A Family in Yellow'). Like that earlier series, the show is a romantic comedy and police procedural. Guido Caprino plays the titular police officer, Luca Manara.

The series consists of two seasons of twelve episodes each: the first was broadcast from 8 January to 12 February 2009 on Rai 1, while the second aired from 3 March 2011 on the same network. A third series, of which the story arc had already been laid out, was not completed.

== Production ==
The show is a spin-off of the 2005 television series Una famiglia in giallo, in which the actor Guido Caprino, who plays Luca Manara, appeared in a secondary role in the fifth episode titled "Biscotti al Veleno". For the new series in which he plays the protagonist, Caprino claimed to have been inspired by Frank Zappa for the behavior and the facial expressions he used in portraying Manara, the actor being an admirer of the Italian-American composer and guitarist.

The episodes are set in a fictional, non-specific location between Orbetello and the Argentario promontory in Tuscany. The first season was actually filmed about 90 kilometres (56 mi) away, in the towns around Lake Bracciano (Bracciano, Trevignano Romano, and Anguillara). In particular, the town hall of Trevignano Romano was transformed into the police station run by the commissioner Luca Manara.

The second season of the series, announced in 2010, was shot in the Maremma and in Rome. Filming lasted 19 weeks, from May to October 2010, for a total of 105 days.

In July 2012 the third season did not appear in the Rai production plans, and the creator of the series Alberto Simone began to fear that the series had met its end, and commented on Facebook:

(I)l nuovo Soggetto di Serie che avevamo già scritto, pieno di novità ancora più divertenti e con un gigantesco colpo di scena nella vita del nostro simpatico protagonista, resterà dunque nei cassetti della produzione.

—Alberto Simone, as quoted by TvBlogo (2012)

The new series story that we already had written, full of even more amusing novelties and with a big plot twist in the life of our friendly protagonist, will remain in the production drawers

—Translation from the Italian.

In August 2013, following the change of management of Rai Fiction (from Fabrizio Del Noce to Eleonora Andreatta), the production of a third season was confirmed, and the broadcast was scheduled for autumn 2014 on Rai 1. In the first months of 2014, however, it was confirmed that the series was definitively cancelled.

== Plot ==
The first season begins with the arrival of the new police commissario (lit. 'commissioner'), (Note: The rank of commissario is head of a commissariato (lit. 'police station') or a police detachment; it is roughly equivalent to the rank of Chief Superintendent in the United Kingdom and several other Commonwealth countries, or a police captain in the United States.) Luca Manara (Guido Caprino), to a small town on the coastal plain of Grosseto in the Maremma area of Tuscany. Manara, whose nonconformity shows in his yellow aviator sunglasses, his penchant for jeans and his motorcycle, (a Triumph Bonneville), was transferred from Milan due to his relationship with a superior's wife. Manara's promiscuity and flirtatious charm continue throughout the series, often causing office drama or helping to solve a case.

On the same day, Inspector Lara Rubino (played by Roberta Giarrusso) also begins work at the station. Unlike Manara, Rubino is from the area; she has just moved back and lives with her aunt, Caterina Bentivoglio (who was Scarpati's mother in the series Una famiglia in giallo) and her German Shepherd Brigadiere, who often discover important clues. Bentivoglio is the first on the crime scene in the pilot episode.

Rubino and Manara met during training at the police academy, and their evolving relationship serves as the show's central romance.

The two solve most of the murders, with occasional assistance from their police subordinates or from Aunt Caterina. Like many police procedurals or detective shows, each episode is devoted to a new murder case that is wrapped up by the end of the episode.

The second season begins with the marriage between Luca Manara and Lara Rubino, which is interrupted by a murder. Because of this, Lara moves to Milan to attend a course for furthering her career and is temporarily replaced in the police station by Marta (Anna Safroncik), a colleague with a dark past who falls in love with Manara. However, Manara still loves Rubino and at the end of the series, the couple reunites. Marta returns to Naples to the anti-Camorra team together with a colleague (initially an enemy of Manara) who heads the counter-terrorism unit.

Recurring characters include: Lara's aunt, Caterina Bentivoglio and Brigadiere; the married police couple Serena Sardi and Augusto Toscani, who in the first series fall in love and get married, while in the second will have a daughter named Alice; the officers Pio Buttafuoco and Mario Barbagallo; the coroner Ginevra Rosmini, a seductive femme fatale; the superintendent Casadio, who does not appreciate Manara's methods but is forced to recognize his talents; and Ada, the owner of the agriturismo (farmhouse accommodation) where Manara lives. Bruno Gambarotta has a recurrent cameo in the role of the policeman Quattroni, who works at the station's front desk, and is known for his heavy Piedmontese accent.

== Cast ==
- Guido Caprino: Luca Manara
- Roberta Giarrusso: Lara Rubino
- Valeria Valeri: Caterina Bentivoglio
- Anna Safroncik: Marta Rivera
- Jane Alexander: Ginevra Rosmini
- Lucia Ocone: Serena Sardi
- Augusto Fornari: Augusto Toscani
- Francesco Quinn: Fabrizio Raimondi
- Giulietta Revel: Annarita Casadio
- Daniela Morozzi: Ada
- Teresa Mannino: Teresa Manara
- Michela Andreozzi: Tiziana Manara
- Luca Calvani: Massimo Cenci
- Eleonora Mazzoni: Alessandra
- Isabelle Adriani: Agnese Mais
