= Anna e i cinque =

- Also known as: Anna and the Five
- Genre: Comedy
- Based on: Ana y los 7 by Ana Obregón
- Directed by: Monica Vullo (s. 1); Franco Amurri (s. 2)
- Starring: Sabrina Ferilli; Pierre Cosso; Jane Alexander; Raul Cremona; Shel Shapiro; Riccardo Garrone; Andréa Ferréol; Franco Castellano; Matteo Urzia; Laura Glavan; Nicolò Diana
- Country of origin: Italy
- Original language: Italian
- No. of seasons: 2
- No. of episodes: 12

Production
- Running time: 100 min./episode

Original release
- Network: Canale 5
- Release: 30 September 2008 – 5 October 2011

Anna e i cinque (Italian: Anna and the Five) is an Italian comedy television series starring Sabrina Ferilli about a woman who is a nanny for a wealthy family by day and stripper by night. It was a remake of the Spanish series Ana y los 7 created by Ana Obregón.

== See also ==
- List of Italian television series
