= Women Don't Want To =

- Directed by: Pino Quartullo
- Written by: Pino Quartullo
- Produced by: Mario & Vittorio Cecchi Gori
- Starring: Pino Quartullo; Lucrezia Lante della Rovere; Antonella Ponziani; Rosalinda Celentano; Francesca Reggiani
- Cinematography: Danilo Desideri
- Music by: Stefano Reali
- Distributed by: Variety Distribution
- Release date: 1993
- Running time: 94 minute
- Country: Italy
- Language: Italian

Women Don't Want To (Italian: Le donne non vogliono più) is a 1993 Italian romantic comedy film written and directed by Pino Quartullo.

== Plot ==
Luca really want to be a father, But his girlfriend is too busy with her career. his obsession gets out of hand and he starts seeking other alternatives including donating to a sperm bank and approaching couples who wants to have a baby.

== Cast ==
- Pino Quartullo as Luca
- Lucrezia Lante della Rovere as Francesca
- Antonella Ponziani as Ricky
- Rosalinda Celentano as Claudia
- Francesca Reggiani as Marta
- Giuseppe Antonelli as Sandro
- Patrizia Loreti as Patrizia
- Alessandra Acciai as Girl on the Scooter
- Maurizio Aiello as Luca's Colleague
- Beatrice Palme as Blonde Girl at the Bar
- Veronika Logan as Girl Chasing Luca
- Severino Antinori as himself
- Jane Alexander
- Paola Minaccioni

== See also ==
- List of Italian films of 1993
