= People Who Are Well =

- Directed by: Francesco Patierno
- Written by: Francesco Patierno; Federico Baccomo
- Starring: Claudio Bisio; Margherita Buy; Diego Abatantuono
- Cinematography: Maurizio Calvesi
- Music by: Santi Pulvirenti
- Distributed by: 01 Distribution
- Release date: 30 January 2014
- Running time: 105 minutes
- Language: Italian

People Who Are Well (Italian: La gente che sta bene) is a 2014 Italian comedy-drama film written and directed by Francesco Patierno. It is loosely based on the novel La gente che sta bene by Federico Baccomo.

== Plot ==
Umberto is apparently a successful and happily married lawyer living in Milan. At work, he is ambitious and ruthless, and, when given the task, fires his coworkers without any regret. At home, his relationship with his wife, Carla, is strained, and his daughter barely talks to him.

One day, after he fails to close a deal, he is, in turn, unexpectedly fired by his law firm. Anyway, luck seems to stay on his side, as, that same evening, at a party, he meets top lawyer Patrizio Azzesi, who offers him a possible job as a director of the new Italian branch of a large international law firm. At the party, he also meets Morgana, Azzesi's wife, who takes a liking to him. Umberto flies to Berlin for his job interview. Afterwards, he spends the evening with Patrizio, who tells him the deal should be done in a matter of days. On his flight back to Italy, the following morning, he finds himself sitting next to Morgana. The two exchange their phone numbers.

During a dinner out at a restaurant, Carla reveals to Umberto that she is pregnant. He quickly dismisses the issue and asks her to have an abortion. She seems to reluctantly comply, however the next day she leaves with the children, to stay at their beach house for a while. In the following days, home alone, Umberto waits in vain for a call from Patrizio. Carla, in turn, won't answer to his calls. When he finally decides to call Patrizio, the latter reveals that another man has been chosen instead of Umberto.

Out of desperation and seeking revenge on both his wife and Patrizio, he arranges a romantic week-end in the mountains with Morgana. There, he receives a call from Patrizio, who renews him the job offer; it is revealed that the man who was supposed to replace him was a former colleague of his, who had contacted Azzesi unbeknownst to Umberto, but this man has been arrested that very day. Despite feeling somewhat humiliated at being considered a second choice, Umberto accepts the offer and lies to Morgana about the reason why he quickly needs to go back to Milan. On their way back, Morgana grows increasingly frustrated at his cynicism and his constant lies. She suddenly accelerates and sends the car off the road. She is killed, while Umberto survives and escapes the accident scene.

Patrizio and Umberto meet to finally close their deal, but Umberto is disgusted by the fact the Patrizio does not care at all about his wife's death. On the contrary, he is relieved at having dodged an expensive divorce. Umberto abruptly refuses the job offer and leaves. He joins Carla at the beach house, where she reveals she did not have the abortion. The couple exchange their roles in the family: Carla resumes her own career as a lawyer, while Umberto takes care of the newborn and their children.

== Cast ==
- Claudio Bisio as Umberto Ilario Durloni
- Margherita Buy as Carla
- Diego Abatantuono as Patrizio Azzesi
- Jennipher Rodriguez as Morgana
- Claudio Bigagli as Durloni's associate
- Laura Baldi as Lorena
- Matteo Scalzo as Giacomino
- Carlotta Giannone as Martina
- Carlo Buccirosso as the Carabinieri Marshal
- Raul Cremona as a customer
