= Raul Cremona =

Italian comedian, magician and actor (born 1956)

- Cremona in 2004
- Born: 10 November 1956 (age 69); Milan, Italy
- Occupations: Comedian; magician; actor
- Years active: 1980s–present

Raul Cremona (born 10 November 1956) is an Italian comedian, magician and actor. He began his career as a magician before moving into cabaret in Milan during the 1980s, developing a style that combines comedy and illusionism. He became widely known for his recurring appearances on Italian television, particularly on Mai dire Gol and Zelig, where he performed characters such as Mago Oronzo and Silvano. His appearances include Voglio essere un mago!, Only Fun - Comico Show and LOL - Chi ride è fuori.

He is the father of DJ and music producer Giordano Cremona, known professionally as Kremont, one half of the duo Merk & Kremont.

== Filmography ==
Film
Year	Title	Role	Notes
1987	Kamikazen: Last Night in Milan	Gangster	Uncredited role
1999	La grande prugna	Carlo	
2008	Il cosmo sul comò	Dentist	
2009	Cado dalle nubi	Roberto	
2013	Ci vuole un gran fisico	Pagliai	
2013	The Chair of Happiness	Casimiro Foggia	
2014	People Who Are Well	Customer	
2015	Italiano medio	Magician	
2024	Ricomincio da taaac	Fabio Galanti	

Television
Year	Title	Role	Notes
2008	Anna e i cinque	Tony	

== Television ==
Year	Title	Role	Notes
1997	Scatafascio	Jerry Manipolini / Normal Hamilton	Comedy show
2021	Voglio essere un mago!	Himself	Magic teacher
2022–present	Only Fun – Comico Show	Himself	Comedy show
2022	Alessandro Borghese: Celebrity Chef	Himself	Contestant
2025	LOL - Chi ride è fuori	Himself	Contestant
2025	Bravissssssimo!		
2025	Gialappa Show	Guest	Comedy show
2025–2026	Che tempo che fa	Guest	Talk show
