= Francesca Reggiani =

Italian actress (born 1959)

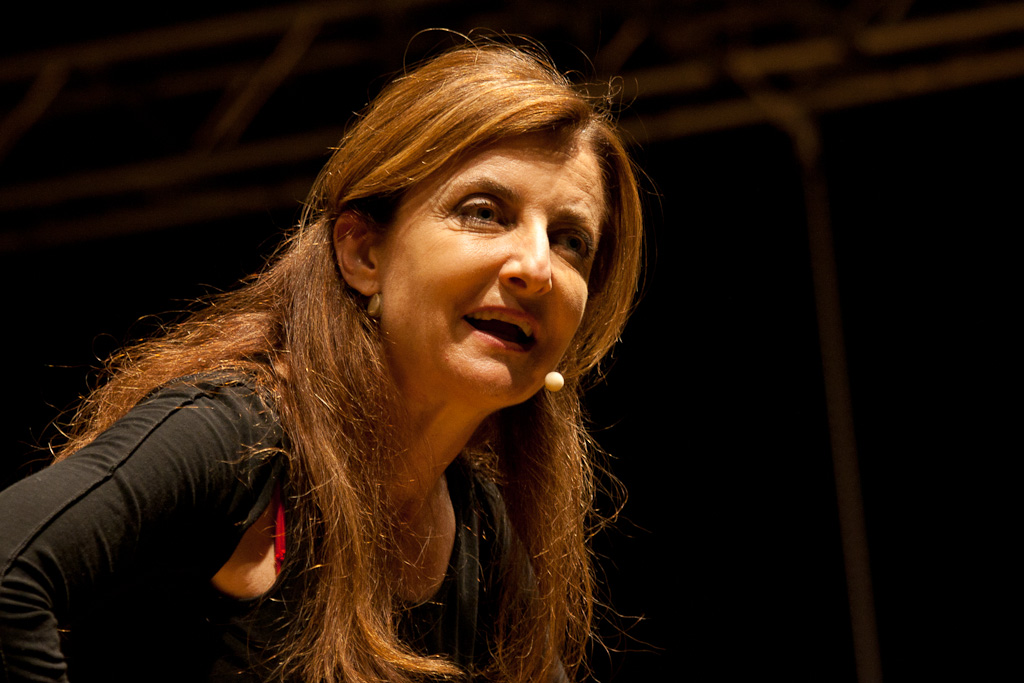
- Reggiani in 2011
- Born: 1 July 1959 (age 66); Rome, Italy
- Occupation: actress
- Years active: 1980s–present

Francesca Reggiani (born 1 July 1959) is an Italian actress and comedian, whose career spans over four decades on stage and screen.

== Life and career ==
Born in Rome, Reggiani trained in dance at the National Dance Academy and the École supérieure de danse de Cannes Rosella Hightower, and studied acting with Gigi Proietti at the Laboratorio di Esercitazioni Sceniche in her hometown.

Reggiani began working in theatre in the early 1980s, but became popular in the early 1990s thanks to her participation in two variety shows broadcast on Rai 3, Scusate l'interruzione and Avanzi. She later appeared in other shows, notably La posta del cuore and Parla con me, and was in the main cast of the Canale 5 series Caro maestro. She is well known for her skills at parodying famous people, notably Sabrina Ferilli, Giorgia Meloni, Carla Bruni, Alba Parietti, Susanna Agnelli, Franca Ciampi, Maria De Filippi and Cristina D'Avena. Her film career mostly consists of comedic character roles.

== Selected filmography ==
- Farewell Moscow, directed by Mauro Bolognini (1986)
- Intervista, directed by Federico Fellini (1987)
- Le finte bionde, directed by Carlo Vanzina (1989)
- The King's Whore, directed by Axel Corti (1990)
- Sognando la California, directed by Carlo Vanzina (1992)
- Ricky & Barabba, directed by Christian De Sica (1992)
- Acquitted for Having Committed the Deed, directed by Alberto Sordi (1992)
- Women Don't Want To, directed by Pino Quartullo (1993)
- A Cold, Cold Winter, directed by Roberto Cimpanelli (1996)
- Sympathy for the Lobster, directed by Sabina Guzzanti (2007)
- The Pills – Sempre meglio che lavorare , directed by Luca Vecchi (2016)
- La notte è piccola per noi, directed by Gianfrancesco Lazotti (2019)
- Illusione, directed by Francesca Archibugi (2025)
