= Inspector Nardone =

- Genre: Crime; Historical fiction
- Created by: Silvia Napolitano; Gianni Cardillo; Marcello Olivieri
- Directed by: Fabrizio Costa
- Composer: Maurizio De Angelis
- Country of origin: Italy
- Original language: Italian
- No. of series: 1
- No. of episodes: 12

Production
- Executive producers: Pino Butti; Aldo U. Passalacqua; Guido De Angelis; Marco De Angelis; Nicola De Angelis; Andjelija Vlaisavljevic
- Cinematography: Massimiliano Trevis
- Editor: Cosimo Andronico
- Production company: Rai 1

Inspector Nardone (Italian:Il commissario Nardone) is a 2012 Italian television miniseries. A crime series, it is based on the real-life figure Mario Nardone, a police officer who operated in 1950s Milan. It aired in twelve episodes on the Italian channel RAI.

The cases presented throughout the series are fictional stories based on real Italian criminal cases, notably the murders committed by Rina Fort, The Beast of San Gregorio, and the armed robberies of the Banda Dovunque, led by Ugo Ciappina.

== Plot ==
Commissioner Mario Nardone, originally from the province of Avellino, was transferred from Monza to Milan immediately after the end of World War II due to irreconcilable disagreements with his superiors. Nardone quickly settled into the Lombardy capital, a city yearning for rebirth and redemption. A meticulous character, Nardone demanded maximum commitment from his colleagues: Muraro, Rizzo, Spitz, and Suderghi soon went from underrated men to great police officers. Nardone, along with them, founded what would become the Squadra Mobile.

The exploits of Nardone and his team were immortalized by Trapani, a photojournalist for La Notte, who gradually became Nardone's friend. The photographer also narrates the series.

His friendship with Flò, a woman of intriguing beauty, introduces Nardone to the dark side and intrigues of Milan and the criminal underworld led by Bosso. Flò will form an unusual but very sincere relationship with Nardone, proving invaluable in his investigations.

In Milan, Nardone also finds love — Eliana, an independent and determined woman, the manager of a pharmaceutical distribution company, forms a deep relationship with the commissioner that will lead him to try his hand at married life.

== Cast ==
- Sergio Assisi as Mario Nardone
- Samantha Michela Capitoni as Vanessa
- Franco Castellano as Ossola
- Sara D'Amario as Rina Fort
- Luigi Di Fiore as Corrado Muraro
- Stefano Dionisi as Sergio Suderghi
- Manlio Dovi as Salvatore Cangemi
- Giampiero Judica as Checco Trapani
- Anna Safroncik as Flò
- Giuseppe Soleri as Luigi Bosso
- Giorgia Surina as Eliana
- Ludovico Vitrano as Peppino Rizzo
- Francesco Zecca as Enrico Spitz
- Igor Filipovic as Sani
- Milan Cucilovic as Curreri
- Milena Pavlovic as Pinuccia Somaschini

== Episodes ==
No. in series	Title	Directed by	Written by	Original release date
1	"Penicillina mortale (Deadly Penicillin)"	Fabrizio Costa	Rocco Pierini, Andrea Purgatori	10 August 2012
In the post-war period, Milan was a poor city. Many were ill and could not afford adequate medical care. The black market was still in full swing, and some essential medicines, such as penicillin, required very high prices. It was into this context that Commissioner Nardone, a policeman from Campania transferred to Milan as punishment for a disagreement with a superior, arrived.
2	"La Banda Dovunque (The All-Over Gang)"	Fabrizio Costa	Rocco Pierini, Andrea Purgatori	10 August 2012
A brutal bank robbery in Cinisello Balsamo. One of many carried out by the infamous All-Over gang, which constantly changes locations to outwit the police and uses high-powered stolen cars to escape pursuit. Nardone wants to investigate, but Ossola is unwilling—he's only supposed to be dealing with car thefts. Nardone takes him at his word and begins investigating the high-powered vehicles used to carry out the heists.
3	"Tradimenti (Betrayals)"	Fabrizio Costa	Marcello Olivieri, Rocco Pierini	17 August 2012
Having solved the case of the All-Over Gang, Nardone regains access to the most important investigation: the murders. The body of an attractive woman, Sofia Piacentini, is found in her car, in a place where couples usually hang out. She appears to be the victim of a robbery gone wrong.
4	"Il falsario (The Forger)"	Fabrizio Costa	Silvia Napolitano, Rocco Pierini	17 August 2012
The murder of technician STIPEL makes it clear that Bosso realized he was being monitored and had the only person capable of discovering his hiding place eliminated. Before his death, the technician had managed to narrow down the area from which the call originated: Trezzano sul Naviglio. And from there, Nardone's investigation begins: how many Angeliques could there be in a small town just outside Milan?
5	"La Strage degli Innocenti – Parte 1 (The Slaughter of the Innocents – Part 1)"	Fabrizio Costa	Silvia Napolitano, Rocco Pierini	24 August 2012
At dawn in Milan, a scream pierces the silence of a street. A woman bursts out of a doorway screaming and collapses on the sidewalk. Half an hour later, police climb the stairs of the building and find the bodies of a mother and her three children. The prime suspect is a certain Pippo Ricciardi, husband and father of the victims, who hasn't been heard from for a couple of days. But Nardone isn't convinced.
6	"La Strage degli Innocenti – Parte 2 (The Slaughter of the Innocents – Part 2)"	Fabrizio Costa	Silvia Napolitano, Rocco Pierini	24 August 2012
The interrogations at the police station continue, but Rina Fort refuses to give in. To gain a glimpse of the mysterious woman, Nardone decides to use a different tactic than a direct assault: patience. He asks her to tell him about her childhood, expresses interest in Fort's opinions, and tries to understand her motives. The episode is also known as "La quadra del cerchio" (Squaring the circle)
7	"Il ritorno (The Return)"	Fabrizio Costa	Silvia Napolitano, Rocco Pierini	31 August 2012
Milan, 1958. The city has changed profoundly. The economic boom allows everyone to dream of a better future. Crime has become organized, and the police force adapts. The police station has more resources, more men, and a new commissioner, Argento. Even though his team disbanded, Nardone is proud of what he has accomplished.
8	"Passione Torbida (Dark Passion)"	Fabrizio Costa	Rocco Pierini, Andrea Purgatori	31 August 2012
The body of a young woman has just been recovered from the Navigli canals, and Nardone goes to the scene. According to the coroner, the girl died from a blow to the head she received before being thrown into the canal. The victim's name is Ludovica Serra, a student who modeled for the Brera painters. She was having an affair with Vittorio Castagna, the rich and spoiled son of a well-known industrialist.
9	"La caccia (The Hunt)"	Fabrizio Costa	Rocco Pierini, Stefano Voltaggio	7 September 2012
Bosso and his men rob a jeweler of his suitcase, which is full of valuables. The jeweler is injured, and the thieves manage to escape with the stolen goods. Immediately realizing that Bosso is behind the robbery, Nardone investigates the robbery and suspects the existence of a ringleader who informed the criminals about the contents of the valuable suitcase.
10	"Campione nel fango (Champion in Disgrace)"	Fabrizio Costa	Rocco Pierini, Stefano Voltaggio	7 September 2012
Nardone is at the scene of a crime. The victim is Toni Mazzillo, a promising boxer, stabbed to death in his home. A pocket watch found at the crime scene suggests the date of death was 1:00 AM. The killer must have then washed in the victim's bathroom and, upon leaving, left the tap running.
11	"Il gatto e il topo – Parte 1 (Cat and Mouse – Part 1)"	Fabrizio Costa	Silvia Napolitano, Rocco Pierini, Vincenzo Scuccimarra	14 September 2012
The body of a man is found in the entrance hall of a building. He had been robbed, but it was a peculiar theft: the thief stole his clothes. The victim was a security guard, Luigi Guarnieri, who worked at the nearby Banca Popolare branch. Once again, Nardone's point of contact is Cangemi. At the informant's bar, the Commissioner wants to gather information to foil Bosso's plan. He is convinced that Cangemi, through his work, might have overheard something and hopes he'll tell him.
12	"Il gatto e il topo – Part 2 (Cat and Mouse – Part 2)"	Fabrizio Costa	Rocco Pierini, Andrea Purgatori	14 September 2012
Bosso springs into action. Before launching his plan, however, Bosso wants to get rid of the police patrols Nardone has unleashed on the city. Counting on the admiration of an elderly thief, Orsomando, for him, Bosso co-opts him at the last minute to rob a bank, making him believe he is taking part in the heist of the century. By the time Nardone realizes he has fallen into Bosso's trap, it is too late. The episode is also known as "Il Grande Colpo" (The Big Shot)

== Production ==
In order to create atmospheres and locations compatible with post-war Italy, while also avoiding the financial burden of having to recreate them on soundstages, almost all exterior shots and a good portion of interior shots were filmed in Serbia. For this reason, many of the supporting actors and extras in the series are Serbian. The miniseries, based on the real-life Milanese police commissioner Mario Nardone and produced by Rai Fiction and DAP Italy, was broadcast for the first time in Italy, two years behind schedule, split into six prime time evenings on Rai 1 starting from Thursday 6 September 2012.
