= When We Were Repressed =

- Directed by: Pino Quartullo
- Written by: Pino Quartullo
- Produced by: Claudio Bonivento
- Starring: Pino Quartullo; Alessandro Gassmann; Lucrezia Lante della Rovere; Francesca D'Aloja
- Cinematography: Roberto Meddi
- Music by: Sergio Cammariere; Massimo Nunzi; Sergio Reali
- Release date: 1992
- Country: Italy
- Language: Italian

When We Were Repressed (Italian: Quando eravamo repressi) is a 1992 Italian comedy film written by, directed by and starring Pino Quartullo, at his directorial debut.

== Cast ==
- Pino Quartullo as Massimiliano
- Alessandro Gassman as Federico
- Francesca D'Aloja as Isabella
- Lucrezia Lante della Rovere as Petra
- Vittorio Gassman as The Sexologist
