= Jane Alexander (British actress) =

British actress (born 1972)

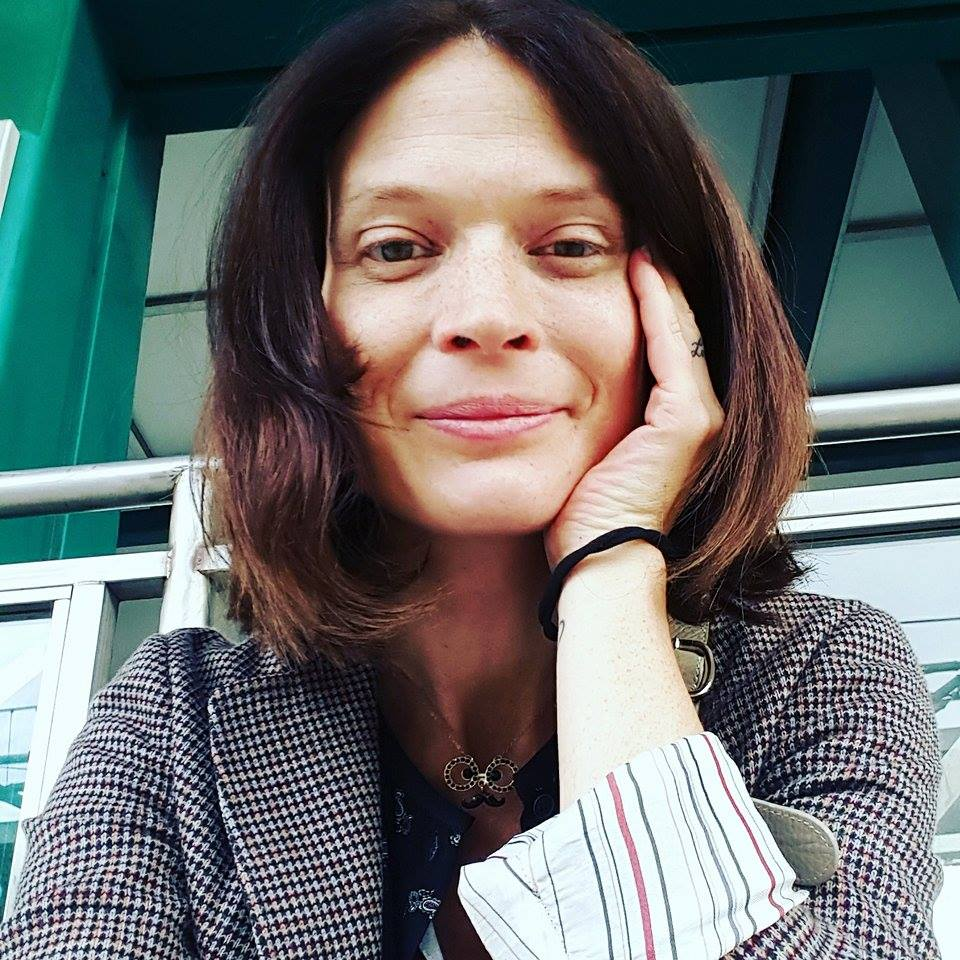
- Born: 28 December 1972 (age 53); Watford, U.K.
- Occupation: Actress

Jane Alexander (born 28 December 1972) is a British-born actress.

== Life and career ==
Born in Watford, the daughter of two voice actors, at a young age Alexander moved to Rome with her family, where she started working as a dubber while still a child. At 16 years old she started working as a model, and in 1993 she made her acting debut in the comedy film Women Don't Want To. In 2001 she also debuted as a presenter, hosting the La7 game show Zengi.

Alexander's breakout role came in 2003, with the villain Lucrezia Van Necker in the Canale 5 TV-series Elisa di Rivombrosa, a role she reprised in the 2007 sequel La figlia di Elisa – Ritorno a Rivombrosa. She later appeared in other successful TV-series, notably Ho sposato un calciatore, Anna e i cinque and Il commissario Manara. Since 2011 Alexander has hosted the Italia 1 show Mistero.

== Private life ==
In Rome, on August 10, 2003 she became the mother of Damiano Lorenzo, born from then-partner Christian Schiozzi, who works in the film and television production sector.

== Filmography ==
=== Films ===
| Year | Title | Role | Notes |
|---|---|---|---|
| 1993 | Women Don't Want To | Girl in the club | Cameo appearance |
| 1995 | The Star Maker | Princess | |
| 1999 | Buck e il braccialetto magico | Susan | |
| 1999 | The Legend of the Titanic | Elizabeth Camden (voice) | English dub; voice role |
| 2002 | The Soul Keeper | Emma Jung | |
| 2007 | Tutte le donne della mia vita | Laura | |
| 2011 | Una cella in due | Pamela | |
| 2012 | Winx Club: The Secret of the Lost Kingdom | Trix (voice) | Italian dub; voice role |
| 2014 | Anita B. | Sarah | |
| 2015 | Lady B. | Lady B. | Short film |
| 2018 | Wine to Love: I colori dell'amore | Laura Rush | |
| 2022 | State of Consciousness | Eliza | |

=== Television ===
| Year | Title | Role | Notes |
|---|---|---|---|
| 2003–2005 | Elisa di Rivombrosa | Lucrezia Van Necker | Main role; 20 episodes |
| 2005 | Ho sposato un calciatore | Tonia Caracci | Miniseries |
| 2006 | La freccia nera | Magdalia di Toblach | Miniseries |
| 2007 | La figlia di Elisa - Ritorno a Rivombrosa | Lucrezia Van Necker | Main role; 8 episodes |
| 2008 | Anna e i cinque | Alessia | Main role (season 1); 6 episodes |
| 2009–2011 | Il commissario Manara | Ginevra Rosmini | Main role; 24 episodes |
| 2010 | Boris | Woman at festival | 2 episodes |
| 2012 | 6 passi nel giallo | Giovanna McBain | Episode: "Vite in ostaggio" |
| 2016 | Rocco Schiavone | Amelia | Episode: "Era di maggio" |
| 2018 | Grande Fratello VIP | Contestant | Reality show (season 3) |
| 2021 | A Time to Kill | Lauren | Episode: "What Happened to Lauren" |
| 2022 | Backstage - Dietro le quinte | Serena | |
