= Isabelle Adriani =

Italian actress, journalist, singer, and writer

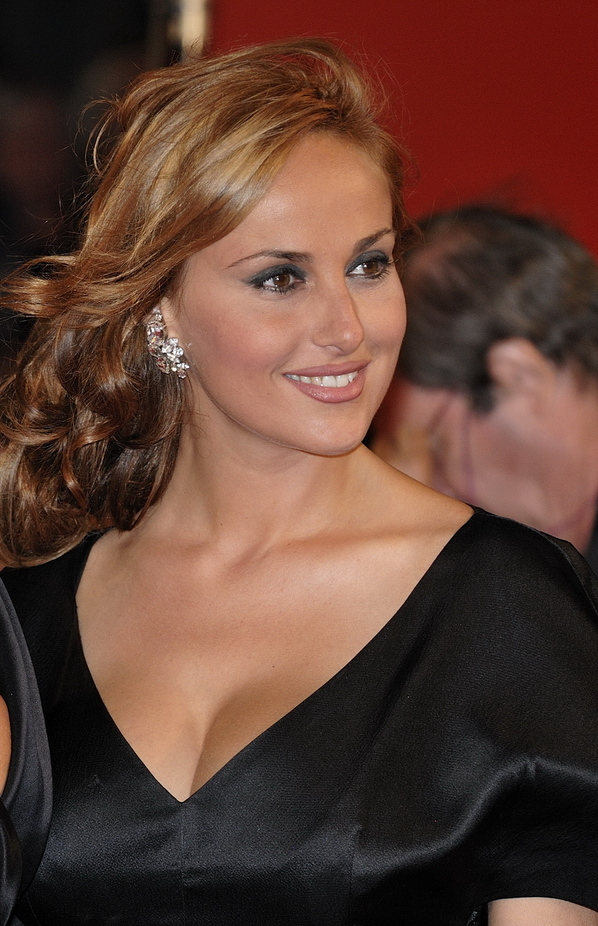
- Adriani in 2009
- Born: Federica Federici; 22 June 1972 (age 54); Umbertide, Perugia, Italy
- Occupations: Actress; journalist; singer; writer
- Years active: 2008–present

Isabelle Adriani (born Federica Federici; 22 June 1972) is an Italian author, actress, and filmmaker.

== Life ==
She is a Doctor in History and Fairy-Tales and developed in over 20 years of studies an overview of the historical truths hidden behind classic tales, publishing over forty books among which ‘The True Story of Cinderella' and the 12 Volume Encyclopedia ‘The DNA of Fairy-Tales’. She studied in several countries and is fluent in 5 languages. She studied Film-Making at the New York Film Academy and has written and directed various documentaries including Open Quantum Relativity about the last theories on time-traveling with NASA and CERN scientists, and The Secrets of Wadi Rum with Dermot Mulroney.

She presented for the first time, the Movie ‘MAGIC DREAMS’ at the Venice Film Festival 2022.

She has worked as an Actress in more than forty film productions in several international productions.

Tv and Radio Presenter she is author and narrator of Le Fiabe della Buonanotte (Good-Night Fairy-Tales) and Le Fiabe dal Mondo (World Fairy-Tales) for the main Tv/Radio National Italian Channel: RAI Radio Kids.

She is also a voice actress for Disney, and the voice of Countess Profumosa (the perfumed Countess) in the cartoon-able Lampadina and Caramello on Rai Yoyo.

She founded and is President of the IA Academy (Isabelle Adriani Academy) in Italy where together with a team of professionals, she teaches film acting and character identification with her own method through fairy-tales.

She founded and is President of the Fairies Cabinet 2022 following the roots of female fairytale authors at the court of King Louis XIV in Versailles.

During the lockdown she organized free courses of 'Acting with fairy-tales' for disadvantaged families of the CSV Emilia (centro servizi volontari) to help them find an artistic way to overcome their fears.

She was born in Italy to two Psychiatrists, her father was a scholar to Carl Gustav Jung.

In 2012 she published "The True Story of Cinderella".

== Partial filmography ==
=== Cinema ===
- INFIDEL, with Jim Caviezel directed by Cyrus Nowrasteh (2020)
- The Young Messiah, directed by Cyrus Nowrasteh (2016)
- Reclaim, directed by Alan White (2014)
- Venuto al mondo, directed by Sergio Castellitto (2012)
- Il tempo delle mimose, directed by Marco Bracco (2012)
- Che bella giornata, directed by Gennaro Nunziante (2011)
- Faccio un salto all'Avana, directed by Dario Baldi (2011)
- Matrimonio a Parigi, directed by Claudio Risi (2011)
- Una sconfinata giovinezza, directed by Pupi Avati (2010)
- Amore 14, directed by Federico Moccia (2009)
- Padrona del suo destino, directed by Marshall Herskovitz (1998)

=== Television ===
- Virus, directed by Monica Gambino (2012)
- L'isola, directed by Alberto Negrin (2012)
- Don Matteo 9, directed by S. Basile (2011)
- Dove la trovi un'altra come me, directed by Giorgio Capitani (2011)
- Il commissario Zagaria, directed by Antonello Grimaldi (2011)
- Il commissario Manara 2, directed by Luca Ribuoli (2011)
- Tiberio Mitri - Il campione e la miss, directed by Angelo Longoni (2011)
- Ho sposato uno sbirro 2, directed by Giorgio Capitani (2009)
