= Mariasole Di Maio =

Italian actress (born 2001)

- Born: 29 July 2001 (age 24); Naples, Campania, Italy
- Occupation: Actress
- Years active: 2008–present

Mariasole Di Maio (born 29 July 2001) is an Italian actress.

== Early life and education ==
From an early age, she showed an interest in art and began studying acting and attending the Giffoni Film Festival as a juror and Mogol's CET (Centro Europeo Toscolano).

At seventeen, she was involved in the production of the Jazzit Fest for the national magazine Jazzit Magazine. After completing high school, she began studying at the New York Film Academy and the Centro Sperimentale di Cinematografia, then decided to enroll in the Faculty of Architecture at the University of Naples Federico II while simultaneously pursuing an acting career. At nineteen, she moved to Rome to study film.

== Career ==
She began her career as a model for Enrico Coveri School, Original Marines, and Gaialuna. She has appeared in Sanpellegrino and BPER advertisements.

She made her small screen debut in 2011 with the RAI series La nuova Squadra - Spaccanapoli where she played Antonio Gerardi's daughter.

She made her film debut at seventeen with the arthouse film Carmela's Diary, in which she played the lead actress. That same year, she was featured in Marie Claire magazine's "Future Visions".

In 2020, at the Teatro d'Innovazione Stabile Galleria Toledo, he made his theatre debut with the show Figlie di Cagna based on Trilogia della città di K by Ágota Kristóf. In the same year, he also took part in the show Falstaff e il suo Re by Stefano Reali based on Shakespeare's Henry IV.

From 2021 to 2024 she was part of the cast of the Rai 3 soap opera Un posto al sole in the role of Speranza Altieri.

== Filmography ==
=== Film ===
Year	Title	Role	Notes
2019	Carmela's Diary	Carmela Esposito	Film
2022	Amore postatomico		Film
2025	Fedeli alla linea		Short film

=== Television ===
Year	Title	Role	Network	Notes
2011	La nuova squadra - Spaccanapoli	Aurora Malinconico	Rai 3	TV series
2021–2024	Un posto al sole	Speranza Altieri	Rai 3	Soap opera

== Theater ==
Year	Title	Theatre
2020	Figlie di Cagna	Teatro d'Innovazione Stabile Galleria Toledo
2020	Falstaff e il suo Re	Teatro d'Innovazione Stabile Galleria Toledo

== Commercials ==
Year	Title	Agency
2008	San Bitter	San Pellegrino
2008	BPER Banca	

== Awards and nominations ==
Year	Award	Category	Work	Result	Notes
2019	Invent a Film Festival	Best actress in a Leading Role	Carmela's Diary	Won	
2022	Donne Per Napoli Award	Audiovisual	Herself	Won	
2022	Lenola Festival	Cinema è Donna	Herself	Won	
2024	Excellency from the Parliamentary Intergroup "Southern Development, Fragile Areas and Minor Islands"		Herself	Won	
