= Marzia Ubaldi =

Italian actress (1938–2023)

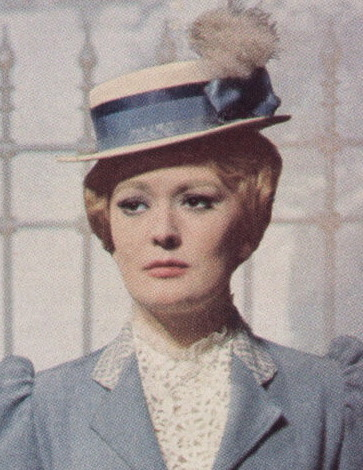
- Ubaldi in La coscienza di Zeno (1966)
- Born: 2 June 1938; Milan, Italy
- Died: 21 October 2023 (aged 85); Narni, Italy
- Occupations: Actress; voice actress
- Years active: 1960–2023
- Spouse: Gastone Moschin (m. 1960; div. 1967)
- Children: 1

Marzia Ubaldi (2 June 1938 – 21 October 2023) was an Italian actress and voice actress.

== Biography ==
Born in Milan, Ubaldi graduated from the drama school of the Piccolo Teatro, and made her professional stage debut in 1960, in the Giorgio Prosperi's drama La congiura directed by Luigi Squarzina. In 1961, she starred in the play Eva a Go Go dalla parte di lui alongside Fabrizio De André; in 1966, she eventually was the first to record De André's song "La ballata dell’amore cieco". In 1962, she was directed by Roberto Rossellini in the Beniamino Joppolo's drama I carabinieri, which was represented at the Festival dei Due Mondi in Spoleto. The same year, she made her film debut in Giorgio Simonelli's Il medico delle donne.

Starting from the 1970s, Ubaldi was mainly devoted to voice dubbing; for her work in this field she received various awards, notably a Nastro d'Argento for her dubbing of Gena Rowlands in Woody Allen's Another Woman, and the 2012 Leggio d'oro Award as best dubber of the year. She also dubbed many actresses such as Judi Dench, Maggie Smith, Anne Bancroft, Vanessa Redgrave and Jeanne Moreau.

Ubaldi was also very active on television, appearing in numerous TV-series, notably Nero Wolfe, Incantesimo, Elisa di Rivombrosa, I Cesaroni and Suburra: Blood on Rome. Her last appearance was in 2023, in Call My Agent - Italia, the Italian version of Call My Agent!.

=== Personal life and death ===
Between 1960 and 1967, Ubaldi was married to actor Gastone Moschin, and the two had a daughter, Emanuela, also an actress. The trio founded and served as teachers in the drama school Mumos, established in 2003 and closed in 2013. Beyond her showbusiness activities, she ran a chihuahua breeding farm.

Ubaldi died in Narni on 21 October 2023, at the age of 85.

== Filmography ==
=== Cinema ===
Year	Title	Role	Notes
1962	Il medico delle donne	Paolino's lover	
1964	Countersex		Segment: "Cocaina di domenica"
1968	Una moglie giapponese?		
1974	E cominciò il viaggio nella vertigine	Tamara	
1977	Nazi Love Camp 27	Frau Gruber	
1977	L'assassino speranza delle donne		
1997	Farfalle		
2001	The House of Chicken	Signorina Dolly	
2017	Non c'è campo	Virginia's grandmother	
2018	Euphoria	Ettore and Matteo's mother	
2020	The Predators	Ines	

=== Television ===
Year	Title	Role	Notes
1966	La coscienza di Zeno	Carla Gerco	TV miniseries
1969	Nero Wolfe	Trella Jarrell	1 episode (season 1, episode 2)
1970	Una coccarda per il re	Madame de Polignac	TV film
1970	Un certo Harry Brent	Vera Stone	TV miniseries
1973	ESP	Anneke Jansen	TV miniseries
1975	L'armadietto cinese	Laura	TV film
1975	Diagnosi		TV miniseries
1978	L'uomo difficile	Antoinette Hechingen	TV film
1980	Ricatto internazionale	Mademoiselle Deladoey	TV miniseries
1980	Arabella	Beatrice	TV miniseries
1983	La pulce nell'orecchio	Raimonda	TV film
1985	Aeroporto internazionale	La madre adottiva	1 episode (season 1, episode 8)
1990	Death Has a Bad Reputation		TV film
1998	Professione fantasma	Serena Baldini	Recurring role
1998	Indiscretion of an American Wife	Floriana Corbinelli	TV film
2000	Valeria medico legale		1 episode (season 1, episode 3)
2003	Incantesimo	Amalia Forti	Recurring role (season 6)
2003–2004	Elisa di Rivombrosa	Amelia	Recurring role (season 1)
2007–2009	7 vite	Sole Fardelli	Main cast
2010	I Cesaroni	Cinzia Rastelli	1 episode (season 4, episode 7)
2012–2018	Questo nostro amore	Alberta	Recurring role
2013	Casa e bottega	Claudia Longarini	TV film
2015	Grand Hotel	Principessa	TV miniseries
2016–2020	L'allieva	Nonna Amalia	Main cast
2018	I nostri figli	Giulia	TV film
2020	Suburra: Blood on Rome	Sibilla Mancini	Main cast (season 3)
2022	I Hate Christmas	Matilde Castoldi	Recurring role (season 1)
2023	Call My Agent - Italia	Elvira Bo	Main cast (season 1)

== Voice work ==
=== Dubbing ===
==== Films (Animation, Italian dub) ====
Year	Title	Role(s)	Ref
1989	Happily Ever After	Mother Nature	
1994	Pom Poko	Oroku	
1996	The Land Before Time IV: Journey Through the Mists	Grandma Longneck	
1997	The Land Before Time V: The Mysterious Island	Grandma Longneck	
1997	Princess Mononoke	Moro	
1998	The Land Before Time VI: The Secret of Saurus Rock	Grandma Longneck	
2005	Pooh's Heffalump Movie	Mama Heffalump	
2005	Tarzan II	Mama Gunda	
2009	A Christmas Carol	Mrs. Dilber	
2011	Mars Needs Moms	The Supervisor	
2012	ParaNorman	Margot Henscher	
2016	Kubo and the Two Strings	Kameyo	

==== Films (Live action, Italian dub) ====
Year	Title	Role(s)	Original actor	Ref
1969	Marlowe	Dolores Gonzáles	Rita Moreno	
1976	Voyage of the Damned	Denise Kreisler	Faye Dunaway	
1978	A Wedding	Ingrid Hellstrom	Viveca Lindfors	
1987	September	Diane	Elaine Stritch	
1988	Torch Song Trilogy	Ma Beckoff	Anne Bancroft	
1988	Another Woman	Marion Post	Gena Rowlands	
1990	Mr. & Mrs. Bridge	India Bridge	Joanne Woodward	
1992	Love Potion No. 9	Madame Ruth	Anne Bancroft	
1992	Home Alone 2: Lost in New York	Pigeon Lady	Brenda Fricker	
1995	How to Make an American Quilt	Glady Joe Cleary	Anne Bancroft	
1995	Home for the Holidays	Adele Larson	Anne Bancroft	
1996	The First Wives Club	Gunilla Garson Goldberg	Maggie Smith	
1997	Mrs Brown	Queen Victoria	Judi Dench	
1997	G.I. Jane	Senator Lillian DeHaven	Anne Bancroft	
1998	Shakespeare in Love	Queen Elizabeth I	Judi Dench	
2000	Autumn in New York	Dolly Talbot	Elaine Stritch	
2000	Chocolat	Armande Voizin	Judi Dench	
2001	Gosford Park	Constance Trentham	Maggie Smith	
2001	Iris	Iris Murdoch	Judi Dench	
2001	Pauline and Paulette	Paulette	Ann Petersen	
2002	The Importance of Being Earnest	Lady Bracknell	Judi Dench	
2002	Divine Secrets of the Ya-Ya Sisterhood	Caro Bennett	Maggie Smith	
2003	Calendar Girls	Cora	Linda Bassett	
2004	Ladies in Lavender	Ursula Widdington	Judi Dench	
2005	Match Point	Betty Eastby	Margaret Tyzack	
2005	Mrs Henderson Presents	Laura Henderson	Judi Dench	
2005	Monster-in-Law	Gertrude Fields	Elaine Stritch	
2007	Love in the Time of Cholera	Tránsito Ariza	Fernanda Montenegro	
2008	Welcome to the Sticks	Antoine's mother	Line Renaud	
2008	The Boy in the Striped Pyjamas	Nathalie	Sheila Hancock	
2009	Nine	Liliane La Fleur	Judi Dench	
2011	J. Edgar	Annie Hoover	Judi Dench	
2011	My Week with Marilyn	Sybil Thorndike	Judi Dench	
2011	Extremely Loud & Incredibly Close	Oskar's grandmother	Zoe Caldwell	
2012	The Best Exotic Marigold Hotel	Evelyn Greenslade	Judi Dench	
2012	Quartet	Jean Horton	Maggie Smith	
2013	Philomena	Philomena Lee	Judi Dench	
2014	Hungry Hearts	Anne	Roberta Maxwell	
2014	My Old Lady	Mathilde Girard	Maggie Smith	
2015	The Second Best Exotic Marigold Hotel	Evelyn Greenslade	Judi Dench	
2015	The Lady in the Van	Margaret Fairchild	Maggie Smith	
2017	Victoria & Abdul	Queen Victoria	Judi Dench	
2017	Tulip Fever	Abbess of St. Ursula	Judi Dench	
2018	Red Joan	Joan Elizabeth Stanley	Judi Dench	
2018	Nothing Like a Dame	Maggie Smith	Maggie Smith	
2020	Artemis Fowl	Julius Root	Judi Dench	
2021	Belfast	Granny	Judi Dench	

==== Television (Live action, Italian dub) ====
Year	Title	Role(s)	Notes	Original actor	Ref
1992	Crazy in Love	Honora Swift	TV film	Gena Rowlands	
1997	Friends	Gloria Tribbiani	1 episode (season 1, episode 13)	Brenda Vaccaro	
2002–2003	Esperança	Luiza	Main cast	Fernanda Montenegro	
