= Anna Safroncik =

Ukrainian-born Italian actress and model

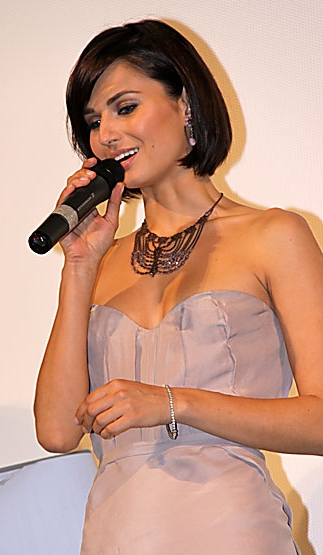
- Born: 4 January 1981 (age 44); Kyiv, Ukraine
- Occupation(s): Actress, model

Anna Safroncik (Ukrainian: Анна Сафрончік; born 4 January 1981) is a Ukrainian-born Italian actress and model.

== Life and career ==
Born in Kyiv, the daughter of a tenor and of a classic ballet dancer, Safroncik debuted on stage at 4 years old. She moved to Italy, in Arezzo, with her family when she was 13 years old. In 1998 Safroncik won the beauty contest Miss Toscana, and the same year she ranked eighth at the Miss Italia competition. She made her film debut in 2000, in Welcome Albania alongside Giancarlo Giannini. She became first known thanks to the role of Anna Baldi, a role she played in the soap opera CentoVetrine from 2004 to 2007. Active in films, television and on stage, Safroncik has also been spokesperson for a number of products.

== Filmography ==
=== Cinema ===
- Welcome Albania (2000)
- C'era un cinese in coma (2000)
- Nightwatchman (2000)
- La matassa (2009)
- La bella società (2009)
- Nine (2009)
- Coincidenze – short (2010)

=== Television ===
- Angelo il custode – TV series (2001)
- Carabinieri – TV series, episode 1x07 (2002)
- Don Matteo – TV series, episode 3x09 (2002)
- Vento di ponente – TV series (2003-2004)
- CentoVetrine - Soap opera (2004-2007)
- La figlia di Elisa – Ritorno a Rivombrosa – TV series (2007)
- Al di là del lago – TV-movie (2009)
- Il falco e la colomba – TV miniseries (2009)
- Il ritmo della vita, regia di Rossella Izzo – film TV (2010)
- Il commissario Manara – TV series (2011)
- Inspector Nardone – TV series (2012)
- Le tre rose di Eva - TV series (2012)
- Le tre rose di Eva 2 - TV series (2013)
- Gli anni spezzati – TV miniseries, 1 episode (2014)
- Il restauratore – TV series (2014)
- Le tre rose di Eva 3 - TV series (2015)
