= Sergio Assisi =

Italian actor (born 1972)

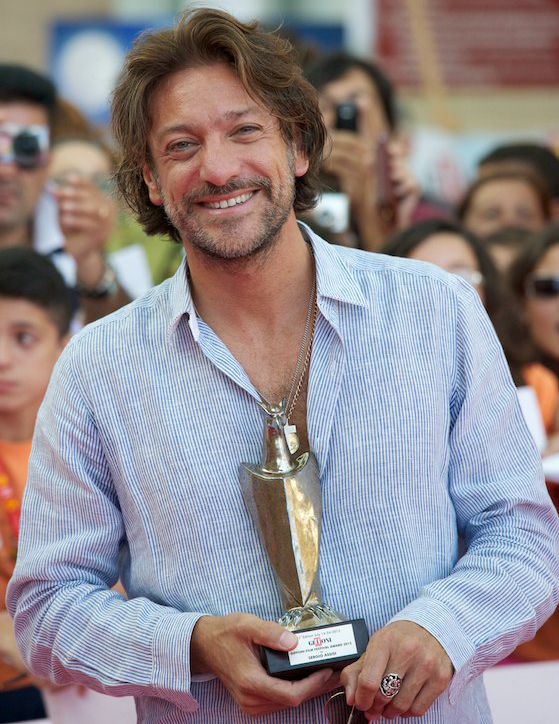
- Assisi at the 2012 Giffoni Film Festival
- Born: 13 May 1972 (age 54); Naples, Italy
- Occupation: Actor
- Years active: 1999–present

Sergio Assisi (born 13 May 1972) is an Italian actor. He appeared in more than twenty films since 1999.

== Selected filmography ==
Film
Year	Title	Role	Notes
1999	Ferdinando and Carolina	Ferdinand I of the Two Sicilies	
2004	Guardians of the Clouds	Crescenzo	
2015	Unique Brothers	Gustavo	

TV
Year	Title	Role	Notes
2005	Elisa di Rivombrosa	Nicola di Conegliano	
2006	Capri	Umberto Galiano	
2012	Inspector Nardone	Mario Nardone	
