= Pino Quartullo =

Italian actor, screenwriter and film director

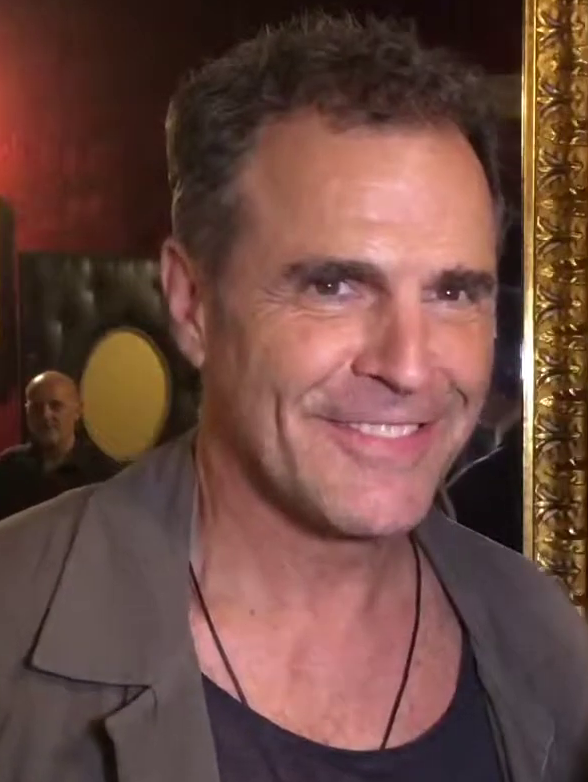
- Quartullo in 2019
- Born: Giuseppe Quartullo; 12 July 1957 (age 69); Civitavecchia, Italy
- Occupations: Actor; director; screenwriter; playwright
- Years active: 1980–present
- Spouse: Margherita Romaniello (m. 2010)
- Children: 1

Giuseppe "Pino" Quartullo (born 12 July 1957) is an Italian actor, director, screenwriter and playwright.

== Life and career ==
Born in Civitavecchia, after getting a degree in architecture, Quartullo graduated in directing at the Silvio d’Amico Academy of Dramatic Arts and then studied at the Drama Laboratory of Gigi Proietti. He debuted on stage with Aldo Trionfo, serving both as an actor and as assistant director. In 1983 he founded the stage company La Festa Mobile, serving as actor, director, and playwright.

In 1985 Quartullo co-directed with Stefano Reali Exit, which was nominated for the Academy Award for Best Live Action Short Film. He made his feature film directorial debut in 1992, with the comedy film Quando eravamo repressi, and from then he directed a number of comedy-dramas, inspired to golden age Commedia all'italiana.

Quartullo has also had a rare career as a dubber. He dubbed Jim Carrey in two of his 1994 feature films, The Mask and Dumb and Dumber.

== Personal life ==
In the mid-1990s, Quartullo was in a relationship with actress Elena Sofia Ricci. They had one daughter, Emma (born 1996). Since 2010, Quartullo has been married to journalist Margherita Romaniello. He considers himself Roman Catholic.

== Selected filmography ==
- Secondo Ponzio Pilato (1987)
- Little Misunderstandings (1989)
- When We Were Repressed (1992, also director and screenwriter)
- Women Don't Want To (1993, also director and screenwriter)
- Love Story with Cramps (1995, also director and screenwriter)
- We'll Really Hurt You (1998, also director and screenwriter)
- Lo zio d'America (TV, 2002–2006)
- What Will Happen to Us (2004)
- Never Again as Before (2005)
- Amiche mie (TV, 2008)
- The Youngest Son (2010)
