= Anna Pavignano =

Italian screenwriter (born 1955)

Anna Pavignano is an Italian screenwriter born in 1955 in Borgomanero. She is best known for her screenplay for the film Il Postino: The Postman and I'm Starting from Three. She was the partner in life and career of Massimo Troisi from 1977 to 1987.

== Career ==
Pavignano had been writing for several years before she really began her professional career. She studied psychology at University of Turin and worked on a television show to pay for her studies. In 1977, she met the actor, director and screenwriter Massimo Troisi on the set of the show Non Stop. Her professional career began with him and on a personal aspect, she found love in Troisi.

Their first film together is I'm Starting from Three in 1981 which was nominated for Best Screenplay at the David di Donatello Awards. They wrote Scusate il ritardo in 1983 nominated for several awards for acting. In 1983, they wrote the film Le vie del Signore sono finite which was nominated for Best Screenplay at the Italian National Syndicate of Film Journalist. Their relation ended in 1987, but they kept working together until the death of Troisi. Their major accomplishment was the film Il Postino in 1994. Tragically, just 12 hours after the end of the shooting of the film, Massimo Troisi died of a heart attack. The movie won several awards and was nominated in many categories as well. The film was nominated for the Oscar of Best Writing, Screenplay Based on Material Previously Produced or Published. It was also nominated for Best Screenplay - Adapted at the BAFTA Awards.

After the end of the relationship with Troisi, Pavignano continued her career, working with other writers. She then wrote Passi d'amore in 1989. She wrote, by herself, the film Ma non per sempre in 1991. In 2002, she wrote the screenplay for the film Casomai and was nominated for a David di Donatello Award for Best Screenplay.

She also started writing books in 2007. She started with the book Da domani mi alzo tardi talking about her past relationship with Massimo Troisi. It is a novel using her life as a subject making it a bit of a biography.

== Bibliography ==
- 2007: Da domani mi alzo tardi
- 2009: In bilico sul mare

== Filmography ==
Collaborative

- 1981: I'm Starting from Three, directed by Massimo Troisi
- 1982: Morto Troisi, viva Troisi!, directed by Massimo Troisi
- 1983: Scusate il ritardo, directed by Massimo Troisi
- 1987: Le vie del Signore sono finite, directed by Massimo Troisi
- 1989: Passi d'amore, directed by Sergio Sollima
- 1991: Pensavo fosse amore, invece era un calesse, directed by Massimo Troisi
- 1994: Il Postino: The Postman, directed by Michael Radford
- 2001: Bad Women, directed by Fabio Conversi
- 2002: Casomai, directed by Alessandro D'Alatri
- 2002: Amore con la S maiuscola, directed by Paolo Costella
- 2004: Se devo essere sincera, directed by Davide Ferrario
- 2010: Sul mare, directed by Alessandro D'Alatri
- 2013: Something good: The Mercury Factor, directed by Luca Barbareschi
- 2014: Elsa & Fred, directed by Michael Radford
- 2023: Massimo Troisi: Somebody Down There Likes Me, directed by Mario Martone

Non-Collaborative

- 1991: Ma non per sempre, directed by Marzio Casa

== Awards ==
Year	Award	Film	Category	Nomination/Win
1981	David di Donatello	I'm Starting from Three	Best Screenplay	Nomination
1988	Italian National Syndicate of Film Journalists	Le vie del Signore sono finite	Best Screenplay	Win
1992	Italian National Syndicate of Film Journalists	Pensavo fosse amore, invece era un calesse	Best Screenplay	Nomination
1996	Oscar	Il Postino: The Postman	Best Writing, Screenplay Based on Material Previously Produced or Published	Nomination
1996	BAFTA Awards	Il Postino: The Postman	Best Screenplay - Adapted	Nomination
2003	David di Donatello	Casomai	Best Screenplay	Nomination
