= David di Donatello for Best Score =

Annual Italian film award

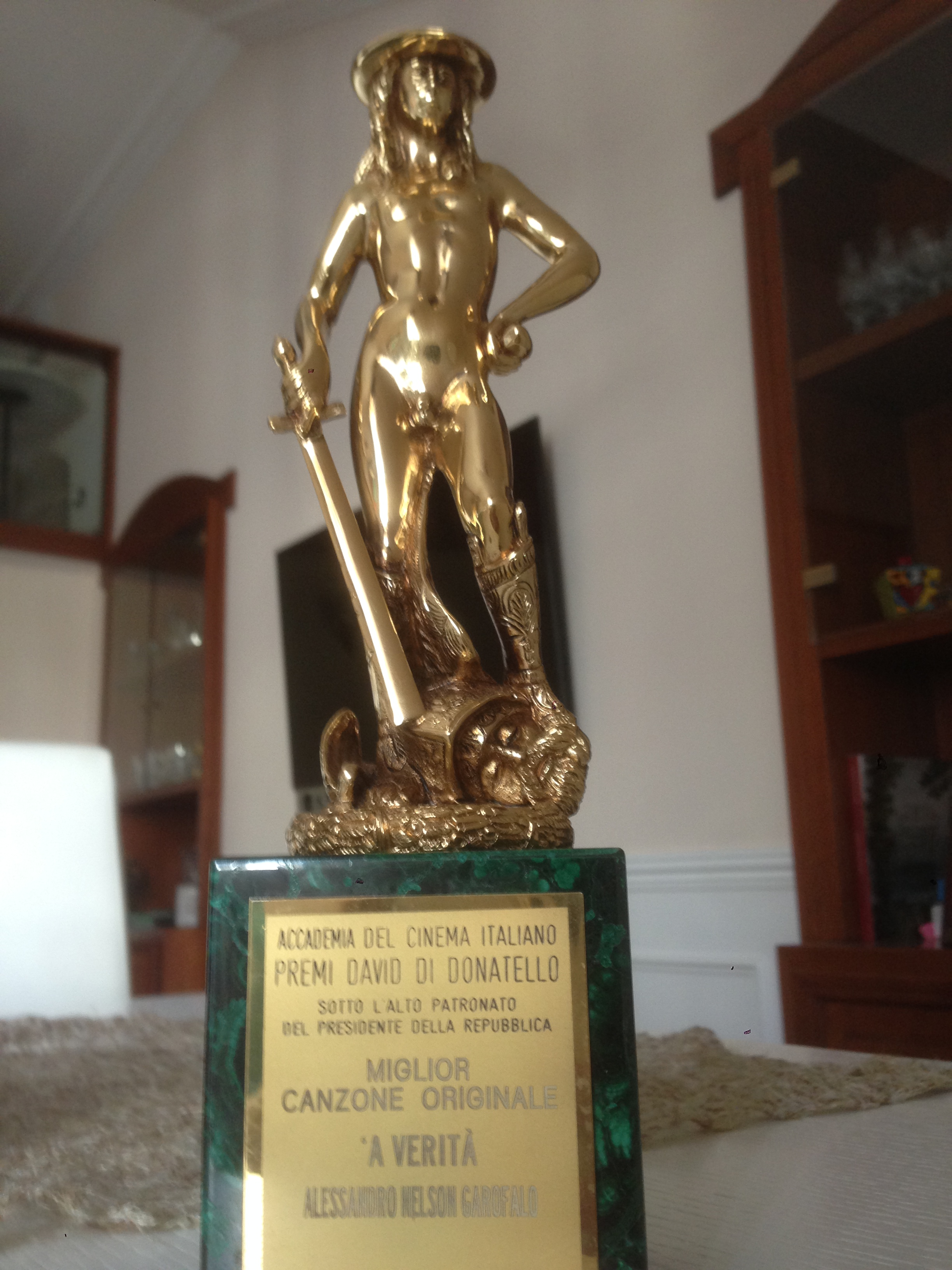
The Award imitates the bronze statue of David by Donatello

The David di Donatello for Best Score (Italian: David di Donatello per il miglior compositore, lit. 'David di Donatello for Best Composer'), known as the David di Donatello per il miglior musicista prior to 2021, is a film award presented annually by the Accademia del Cinema Italiano (ACI, Academy of Italian Cinema) to recognize outstanding efforts on the part of film music composers who have worked within the Italian film industry during the year preceding the ceremony. The award has been given every year since 1975, with the exception of the 1979 and 1980 editions.

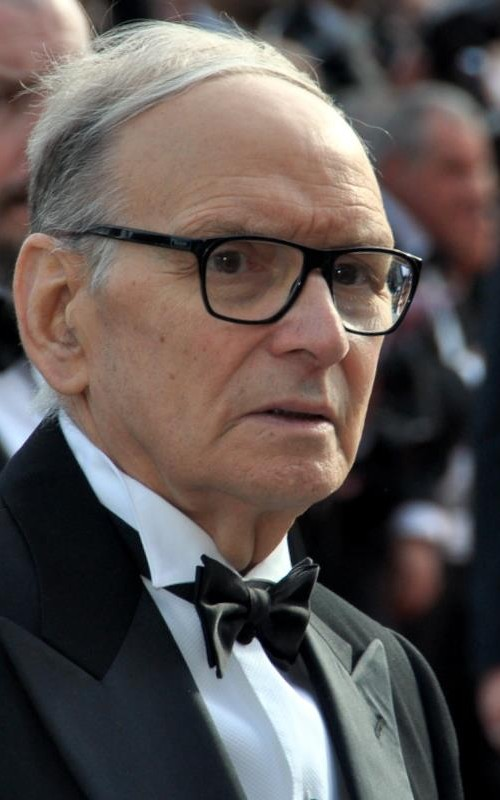
Ennio Morricone at the 2012 Cannes Film Festival

Ennio Morricone is the record holder in the category.

== Winners and nominees ==
Winners are indicated in bold.

=== 1970s ===
1975

- **Piero Piccioni** – Swept Away

1976

- **Franco Mannino** – The Innocent

1977

- **Nino Rota** – Fellini's Casanova

1978

- **Armando Trovajoli** – Wifemistress

=== 1980s ===
1981

- **Fiorenzo Carpi** – Eugenio
- Ennio Morricone – Bianco, rosso e Verdone
- Piero Piccioni – Three Brothers
- Riz Ortolani – Help Me Dream

1982

- **Lucio Dalla** and **Fabio Liberatori** – Talcum Powder
- Fiorenzo Carpi – Cercasi Gesù
- Carlo Rustichelli – Forest of Love

1983

- **Angelo Branduardi** – State buoni se potete
- Nicola Piovani – The Night of the Shooting Stars
- Armando Trovajoli – That Night in Varennes

1984

- **Armando Trovajoli** and **Vladimir Cosna** – Ballando ballando
- Gianfranco Plenizio – And the Ship Sails On
- Francesco De Gregori – Flirt

1985

- **Carlo Savina** – Pizza Connection
- Nicola Piovani – Kaos
- Riz Ortolani – The Three of Us

1986

- **Riz Ortolani** – Graduation Party (ex aequo)
- **Nicola Piovani** – Ginger and Fred (ex aequo)
- Armando Trovajoli – Macaroni

1987

- **Armando Trovajoli** – The Family
- Riz Ortolani – Christmas Present
- Giovanna Marini – A Tale of Love

1988

- **Ennio Morricone** – The Gold Rimmed Glasses
- Nicola Piovani – It's Happening Tomorrow
- Francis Lai – Dark Eyes

1989

- **Ennio Morricone** – Cinema Paradiso
- Vangelis – Francesco
- Armando Trovajoli – Splendor

=== 1990s ===
1990

- **Claudio Mattone** – Street Kids
- Mario Nascimbene – Blue Dolphin – L'avventura continua
- Riz Ortolani – The Story of Boys & Girls
- Nicola Piovani – The Voice of the Moon
- Armando Trovajoli – What Time Is It?

1991

- **Ennio Morricone** – Everybody's Fine
- Armando Trovajoli – Captain Fracassa's Journey
- Giancarlo Bigazzi and Marco Falagiani – Mediterraneo
- Antonello Venditti – Ultra
- Riz Ortolani – Nel giardino delle rose

1992

- **Franco Piersanti** – The Stolen Children
- Francesco De Gregori – The Invisible Wall
- Pino Daniele – Pensavo fosse amore, invece era un calesse

1993

- **Ennio Morricone** – Jonah Who Lived in the Whale
- Ennio Morricone – The Escort
- Riz Ortolani – Magnificat

1994

- **Nicola Piovani** – Caro diario
- Federico De Robertis – Sud
- Nicola Piovani – For Love, Only for Love

1995

- **Franco Piersanti** – Lamerica
- Luis Bacalov – Il Postino: The Postman
- Pino Donaggio – Un eroe borghese

1996

- **Manuel De Sica** – Celluloide
- Ennio Morricone – The Star Maker
- Armando Trovaioli – The Story of a Poor Young Man

1997

- **Paolo Conte** – How the Toys Saved Christmas
- Luis Bacalov – The Truce
- Carlo Crivelli – The Prince of Homburg
- Federico De Robertis and Mauro Pagani – Nirvana
- Nicola Piovani – My Generation

1998

- **Nino D'Angelo** – To Die for Tano
- Franco Piersanti – Notes of Love
- Nicola Piovani – Life Is Beautiful

1999

- **Ennio Morricone** – The Legend of 1900
- Ludovico Einaudi – Not of this World
- Luciano Ligabue – Radiofreccia

=== 2000s ===
2000

- **Ennio Morricone** – Canone inverso
- Paolo Buonvino – But Forever in My Mind
- Pivio and Aldo De Scalzi – Outlaw

2001

- **Nicola Piovani** – The Son's Room
- Ennio Morricone – Malèna
- Armando Trovajoli – Unfair Competition

2002

- **Fabio Vacchi** – The Profession of Arms
- Luciano Ligabue – Da zero a dieci
- Giovanni Venosta – Burning in the Wind

2003

- **Andrea Guerra** – Facing Windows
- Banda Osiris – The Embalmer
- Pivio and Aldo De Scalzi – Casomai
- Riz Ortolani – Incantato
- Nicola Piovani – Pinocchio

2004

- **Banda Osiris** – First Love
- Ezio Bosso – I'm Not Scared
- Andrea Guerra – What Will Happen to Us
- Riz Ortolani – Christmas Rematch
- Giovanni Venosta – Agata and the Storm

2005

- **Riz Ortolani** – But When Do the Girls Get Here?
- Paolo Buonvino – Manual of Love
- Pasquale Catalano – The Consequences of Love
- Andrea Guerra – Sacred Heart
- Franco Piersanti – The Keys to the House

2006

- **Franco Piersanti** – The Caiman
- Goran Bregović – The Days of Abandonment
- Paolo Buonvino – Romanzo Criminale
- Negramaro (Fabio Barovero, Simone Fabroni, Roy Paci, Louis Siciliano) – The Fever
- Bruno Zambrini – Notte prima degli esami

2007

- **Ennio Morricone** – The Unknown Woman
- Teho Teardo – The Family Friend
- Neffa – Saturn in Opposition
- Franco Piersanti – My Brother Is an Only Child
- Fabio Vacchi – Centochiodi

2008

- **Paolo Buonvino** – Quiet Chaos
- Lele Marchitelli – Piano, solo
- Fausto Mesolella – Don't Waste Your Time, Johnny!
- Teho Teardo – The Girl by the Lake
- Giovanni Venosta – Days and Clouds

2009

- **Teho Teardo** – Il Divo
- Bruno Zambrini – Many Kisses Later
- Baustelle – Giulia Doesn't Date at Night
- Paolo Buonvino – Italians
- Pivio and Aldo De Scalzi – We Can Do That

=== 2010s ===
2010

- **Ennio Morricone** – Baarìa
- Marco Biscarini and Daniele Furlati – The Man Who Will Come
- Carlo Virzì – The First Beautiful Thing
- Pasquale Catalano – Loose Cannons
- Carlo Crivelli – Vincere

2011

- **Rita Marcotulli** and **Rocco Papaleo** – Basilicata Coast to Coast
- Umberto Scipione – Benvenuti al Sud
- Teho Teardo – The Jewel
- Fausto Mesolella – Into Paradiso
- Hubert Westkemper – We Believed

2012

- **David Byrne** – This Must Be the Place
- Umberto Scipione – Benvenuti al Nord
- Giuliano Taviani and Carmelo Travia – Caesar Must Die
- Franco Piersanti – We Have a Pope
- Pasquale Catalano – Magnificent Presence

2013

- **Ennio Morricone** – The Best Offer
- Alexandre Desplat – Reality
- Mauro Pagani – Siberian Education
- Franco Piersanti – Me and You
- Teho Teardo – Diaz - Don't Clean Up This Blood

2014

- **Pivio and Aldo De Scalzi** – Song'e Napule
- Pasquale Catalano – Fasten Your Seatbelts
- Lele Marchitelli – The Great Beauty
- Umberto Scipione – Sotto una buona stella
- Carlo Virzì – Human Capital

2015

- **Giuliano Taviani** – Black Souls
- Nicola Piovani – Hungry Hearts
- Sascha Ring – Leopardi
- Ezio Bosso, Federico De Robertis – The Invisible Boy
- Paolo Fresu – Greenery Will Bloom Again

2016

- **David Lang** – Youth
- Alexandre Desplat – Tale of Tales
- Ennio Morricone – The Correspondence
- Michele Braga, Gabriele Mainetti – They Call Me Jeeg
- Paolo Vivaldi and Alessandro Sartini – Don't Be Bad

2017

- **Enzo Avitabile** – Indivisibile
- Carlo Crivelli – Sweet Dreams
- Carlo Virzì – Like Crazy
- Franco Piersanti – La stoffa dei sogni
- Andrea Farri – Italian Race

2018

- **Pivio and Aldo De Scalzi** – Love and Bullets
- Antonio Fresa, Luigi Scialdone – Cinderella the Cat
- Franco Piersanti – Tenderness
- Pasquale Catalano – Naples in Veils
- Gatto Ciliegia contro il Grande Freddo – Nico, 1988

2019

- **Sascha Ring** and **Philipp Thimm** – Capri-Revolution
- Nicola Piovani – There's No Place Like Home
- Nicola Tescari – Euphoria
- Lele Marchitelli – Loro
- Mokadelic – On My Skin

=== 2020s ===
2020

- **Orchestra di Piazza Vittorio** – Il flauto magico di piazza Vittorio
- Andrea Farri – The First King: Birth of an Empire
- Nicola Piovani – The Traitor
- Dario Marianelli – Pinocchio
- Thom Yorke – Suspiria

2021

- **Gatto Ciliegia contro il Grande Freddo** and **Downtown Boys** – Miss Marx
- Nicola Piovani – Hammamet
- Niccolò Contessa – The Predators
- Michele Braga – Rose Island
- Pivio and Aldo De Scalzi – Thou Shalt Not Hate
- Marco Biscarini and Daniele Furlati – Hidden Away

2022

- **Nicola Piovani** – I fratelli De Filippo
- Dan Romer and Benh Zeitlin – A Chiara
- Verdena – America Latina
- Pasquale Scialò – The Inner Cage
- Pivio and Aldo De Scalzi – Diabolik
- Michele Braga and Gabriele Mainetti – Freaks Out

2023

- **Stefano Bollani** – Il pataffio
- Emanuele Bosi and Michele Braga – Strangeness
- Daniel Norgren – The Eight Mountains
- Franco Piersanti – Dry
- Fabio Massimo Capogrosso – Exterior Night

2024

- **Subsonica** – Adagio
- Lele Marchitelli – There's Still Tomorrow
- Franco Piersanti – A Brighter Tomorrow
- Andrea Farri – Io capitano
- Santi Pulvirenti – Last Night of Amore

2025

- **Margherita Vicario and Davide Pavanello** – Gloria!
- Nicola Piovani – The Children's Train
- Thom Yorke – Confidenza
- Iosonouncane – The Great Ambition
- Colapesce – Sicilian Letters

2026

- **Fabio Massimo Capogrosso** – Primavera
- Franco Amurri – Forbidden City
- Krano – The Last One for the Road
- Mauro Pagani – The Tasters
- Trent Reznor and Atticus Ross – Queer

== See also ==
- Nastro d'Argento for Best Score
- Cinema of Italy
