= Nastro d'Argento for Best Score =

Annual film award

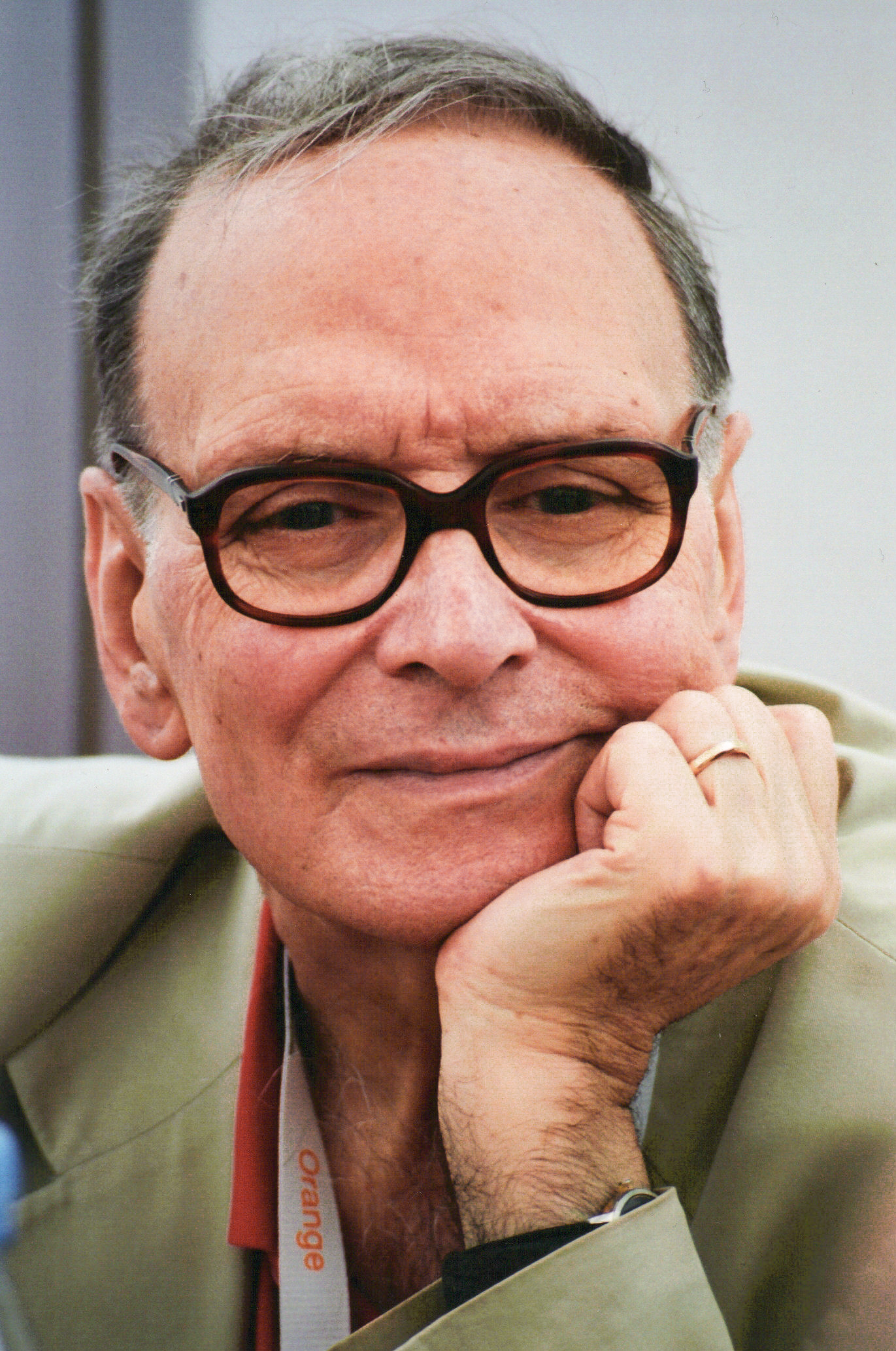
Ennio Morricone at the Cannes film festival, 2007

The Nastro d'Argento (Silver Ribbon) is a film award assigned each year, since 1946, by Sindacato Nazionale dei Giornalisti Cinematografici Italiani ("Italian National Syndicate of Film Journalists"), the association of Italian film critics.

This is the list of Nastro d'Argento awards for Best Score. Ennio Morricone is the record holder with nine Nastro d'Argento awards for Best Score received from 1965 to 2013.

== 1940s ==
- 1947 - Renzo Rossellini - Paisan
- 1948 - Renzo Rossellini - The Brothers Karamazov
- 1949 - Alessandro Cicognini - Bicycle Thieves

== 1950s ==
- 1950 - Roman Vlad - for all his works
- 1951 - Giovanni Fusco - Story of a Love Affair
- 1952 - Mario Nascimbene - Rome 11:00
- 1953 - Valentino Bucchi - Eager to Live
- 1954 - Mario Zafred - Chronicle of Poor Lovers
- 1955 - Angelo Francesco Lavagnino - Lost Continent
- 1956 - Angelo Francesco Lavagnino - Vertigine bianca
- 1957 - Nino Rota - War and Peace
- 1958 - Nino Rota - White Nights
- 1959 - Carlo Rustichelli - A Man of Straw

== 1960s ==
- 1960 - Mario Nascimbene - Violent Summer
- 1961 - Giovanni Fusco - L'Avventura
- 1962 - Giorgio Gaslini - La Notte
- 1963 - Piero Piccioni - Salvatore Giuliano
- 1964 - Nino Rota - 8½
- 1965 - Ennio Morricone - A Fistful of Dollars
- 1966 - Armando Trovajoli - Seven Golden Men
- 1967 - Carlo Rustichelli - For Love and Gold
- 1968 - Mario Nascimbene - Pronto... c'è una certa Giuliana per te
- 1969 - Nino Rota - Romeo and Juliet

== 1970s ==
- 1970 - Ennio Morricone - Metti una sera a cena
- 1971 - Stelvio Cipriani - The Anonymous Venetian
- 1972 - Ennio Morricone - Sacco & Vanzetti
- 1973 - Guido De Angelis, Maurizio De Angelis - All the Way, Boys
- 1974 - Tony Renis - Brothers Blue
- 1975 - Giancarlo Chiaramello - Orlando Furioso
- 1976 - Adriano Celentano - Yuppi du
- 1977 - Fred Bongusto - Oh, Serafina!
- 1978 - Armando Trovajoli - A Special Day
- 1979 - Nino Rota - Orchestra Rehearsal

== 1980s ==
- 1980 - Fred Bongusto - The Cricket
- 1981 - Riz Ortolani - Help Me Dream
- 1982 - Lucio Dalla, Fabio Liberatori - Talcum Powder
- 1983 - Angelo Branduardi - State buoni... se potete
- 1984 - Riz Ortolani - A School Outing
- 1985 - Ennio Morricone - Once Upon a Time in America
- 1986 - Tony Esposito - Camorra (A Story of Streets, Women and Crime)
- 1987
  - Armando Trovajoli - The Family
  - Riz Ortolani - The Inquiry
  - Giovanni Nuti - Stregati
- 1988 - Ennio Morricone - The Untouchables
- 1989 - Eugenio Bennato, Carlo D'Angiò - Cavalli si nasce

== 1990s ==
- 1990 - Claudio Mattone - Street Kids
- 1991 - Nicola Piovani - The Voice of the Moon, In the Name of the Sovereign People, Dark Illness, The Sun Also Shines at Night
- 1992 - Pino Daniele - Pensavo fosse amore invece era un calesse
- 1993 - Manuel De Sica - Al lupo al lupo
- 1994 - Federico De Robertis - Sud
- 1995 - Luis Enríquez Bacalov - Il Postino: The Postman
- 1996 - Lucio Dalla - Beyond the Clouds
- 1997 - Paolo Conte - How the Toys Saved Christmas
- 1998 - Nino D'Angelo - To Die for Tano
- 1999 - Eugenio Bennato - The Room of the Scirocco

== 2000s ==
- 2000 - Ennio Morricone - Canone inverso
- 2001 - Ennio Morricone - Malèna
- 2002 - Edoardo Bennato - Il principe e il pirata
- 2003 - Nicola Piovani - Pinocchio
- 2004 - Paolo Fresu - L'isola
- 2005 - Banda Osiris - First Love
- 2006 - Negramaro, Roy Paci, Fabio Barovero, Simone Fabbroni, Louis Siciliano - The Fever
- 2007 - Ennio Morricone - The Unknown Woman
- 2008 - Paolo Buonvino - Quiet Chaos
- 2009 - Paolo Buonvino - Italians

== 2010s ==
- 2010 - Rita Marcotulli - Basilicata coast to coast
- 2011 - Negramaro - Vallanzasca – Gli angeli del male
- 2012 - Franco Piersanti - Terraferma, The First Man
- 2013 - Ennio Morricone - The Best Offer
- 2014 - Pivio and Aldo De Scalzi - Song'e Napule
- 2015 - Nicola Piovani - Hungry Hearts
- 2016 - Carlo Virzì - Like Crazy
- 2017 - Enzo Avitabile - Indivisible
- 2018 - Pivio e Aldo De Scalzi - Love and Bullets
- 2019 - Nicola Piovani - The Traitor

== 2020s ==
- 2020 - Brunori Sas - I Hate Summer and Pasquale Catalano - The Goddess of Fortune
- 2021 - Stefano Bollani - Carosello Carosone
- 2022 - Nicola Piovani - Leonora addio and I fratelli De Filippo
- 2023 - Colapesce Dimartino - La primavera della mia vita
- 2024 - Margherita Vicario and Dade - Gloria!
- 2025 - Lele Marchitelli - Parthenope

== See also ==
- David di Donatello for Best Score
- Cinema of Italy
- List of film music awards § Best score
