= Fabio Volo =

Italian writer and actor (born 1972)

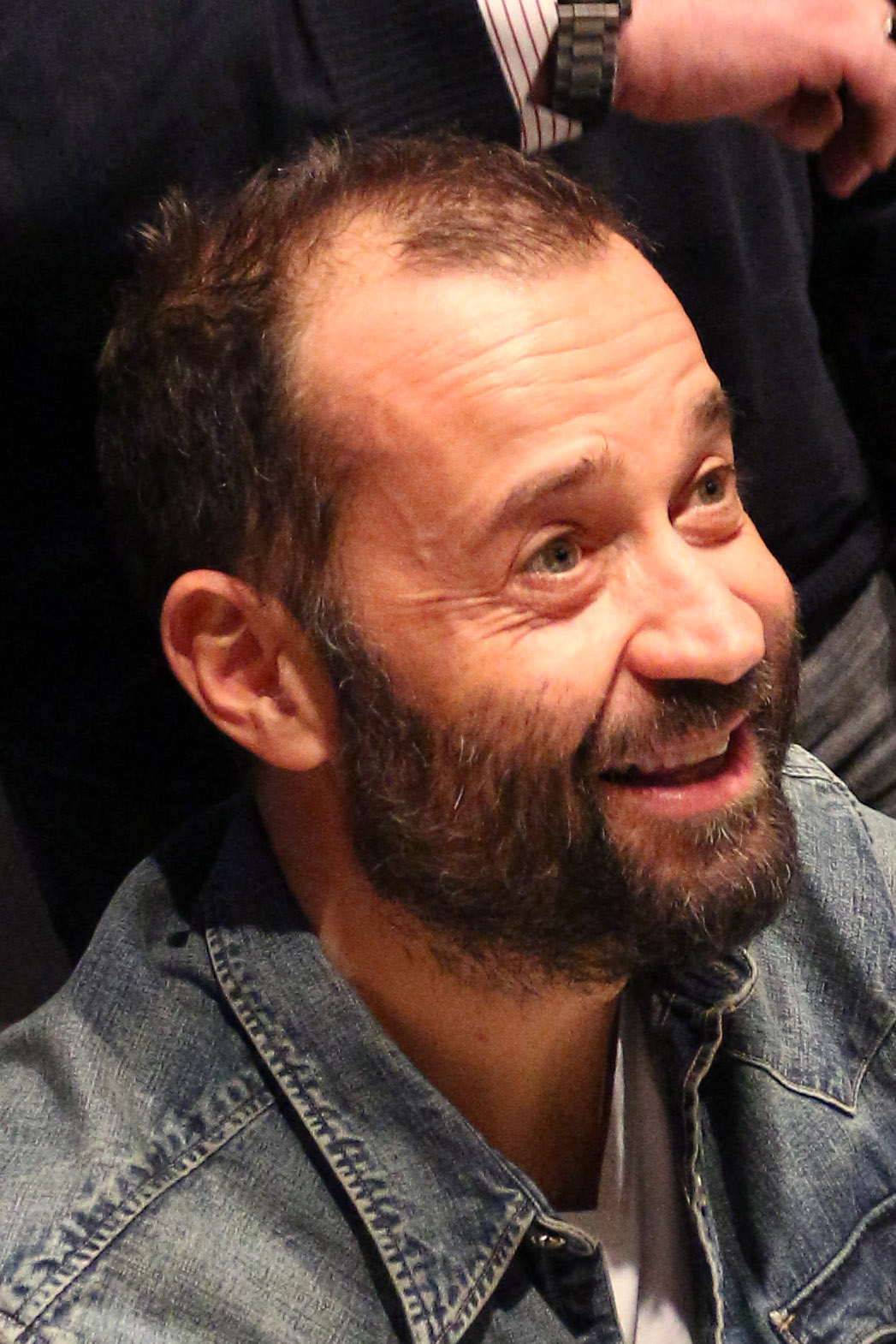
- Born: Fabio Bonetti; 23 June 1972 (age 54); Calcinate, Italy
- Occupations: Author; actor; screenwriter; television presenter; radio presenter; singer

Fabio Volo, pseudonym of Fabio Bonetti, (born 23 June 1972) is an Italian writer, actor, radio and television presenter, screenwriter, drummer, singer, and philosopher.

== Career ==
Fabio Bonetti was born in Calcinate, Italy on 23 June 1972. After attending middle school, he worked in his father's bakery (which is now an ice-cream shop in Brescia) and did other casual jobs (like modeling and nightlife related). In 1996 he became a leading figure at Radio Capital, an Italian radio station. As from 1998, he anchored three edition of the TV program Le Iene.

In 2000 he began to anchor his own radio broadcast "Il volo del mattino" on Radio Deejay and he published his first book entitled "Esco a fare due passi". This was followed by "È una vita che ti aspetto", "Un posto nel mondo", "Il giorno in più", "Il tempo che vorrei", "Le prime luci del mattino" and "La strada verso casa".

In 2002 he debuted as an actor in Alessandro D'Alatri's movie "Casomai". He was nominated for Best Actor at the David di Donatello for his role in this film. In 2006 and 2008 Fabio Volo anchored "Italo Spagnolo" and "Italo Americano" on MTV. In 2010 he won the "Premio Letterario la Tore Isola d'Elba", an ingenuity and excellence award. In 2011, Volo starred in "Il giorno in più", the movie based on his eponymous book. In 2012 he returned in television with "Volo in diretta" on Rai 3.

Internationally, Volo has served as the voice of Po in the Italian version of the Kung Fu Panda film series.

== Filmography ==
=== Films ===
Year	Title	Role	Director	Notes
2002	Casomai	Tommaso	Alessandro D'Alatri	Acting debut
2002	Playgirl	Fabio	Fabio Tagliavia	
2003	Opopomoz	Farfaricchio (voice)	Enzo D'Alò	Italian dub; voice role
2005	The Fever	Mario	Alessandro D'Alatri	
2006	One Out of Two	Lorenzo	Eugenio Cappuccio	Also screenwriter
2007	Manual of Love 2	Franco	Giovanni Veronesi	
2008	Kung Fu Panda	Po (voice)	John Stevenson	Italian dub; voice role
2008	Black and White	Carlo	Cristina Comencini	
2009	Secrets of the Furious Five	Po (voice)	Raman Hui	Italian dub; voice role
2010	Marriage and Other Disasters	Alessandro	Nina di Majo	
2010	Unlikely Revolutionaries	Toni	Lucio Pellegrini	
2010	Niente paura	Himself	Piergiorgio Gay	Documentary film
2011	One Day More	Giacomo Pasetti	Massimo Venier	Also screenwriter
2011	Kung Fu Panda 2	Po (voice)	Jennifer Yuh	Italian dub; voice role
2013	Studio illegale	Andrea Campi	Umberto Carteni	
2016	Kung Fu Panda 3	Po (voice)	Jennifer Yuh	Italian dub; voice role
2016	Un paese quasi perfetto	Gianluca	Massimo Gaudioso	
2018	Alio - Un'avventura tra i ghiacci	Narrator (voice)	Guillaume Maidachesky	Italian dub; voice role
2020	Onward	Wilden Lightfoot (voice)	Dan Scanlon	Italian dub; voice role
2021	Genitori vs influencer	Paolo Martinelli	Michela Andreozzi	
2021	Per tutta la vita	Vito	Paolo Costella	
2023	Una gran voglia di vivere	Marco	Michela Andreozzi	
2024	Kung Fu Panda 4	Po (voice)	Mike Mitchell	Italian dub; voice role

=== Television ===
Year	Title	Role	Network	Notes
1998–2001, 2016	Le Iene	Himself/co-host	Italia 1	Information program (seasons 1–4, 19)
1999–2000	Candid Camera	Himself/co-host	Canale 5	Comedy show (season 14)
2001–2002	Ca' Volo	Himself/host	MTV	Talk show
2003	Smetto quando voglio	Himself/host	Italia 1	Variety show
2006–2008	Italo…	Himself/host	MTV	Reality show
2012–2013	Volo in diretta	Himself/host	Rai 3	Variety/talk show
2014–2018	Che tempo che fa	Himself/ Recurring guest	Rai 1	Variety/talk show
2016–2018	Untraditional	Fabio/Himself	Nove	Lead role

== Books ==
With his novels he has sold over 5 million copies in Italy alone. As of 2019, he has written ten books:

- Esco a fare due passi (2001)
- È una vita che ti aspetto (2003)
- Un posto nel mondo (2006)
- Il giorno in più (2007)
- Il tempo che vorrei (2009)
- Le prime luci del mattino (2011)
- La strada verso casa (2013)
- È tutta vita (2015)
- Quando tutto inizia (2017)
- Una Gran Voglia di Vivere (2019)
