= Lina Polito =

Italian actress

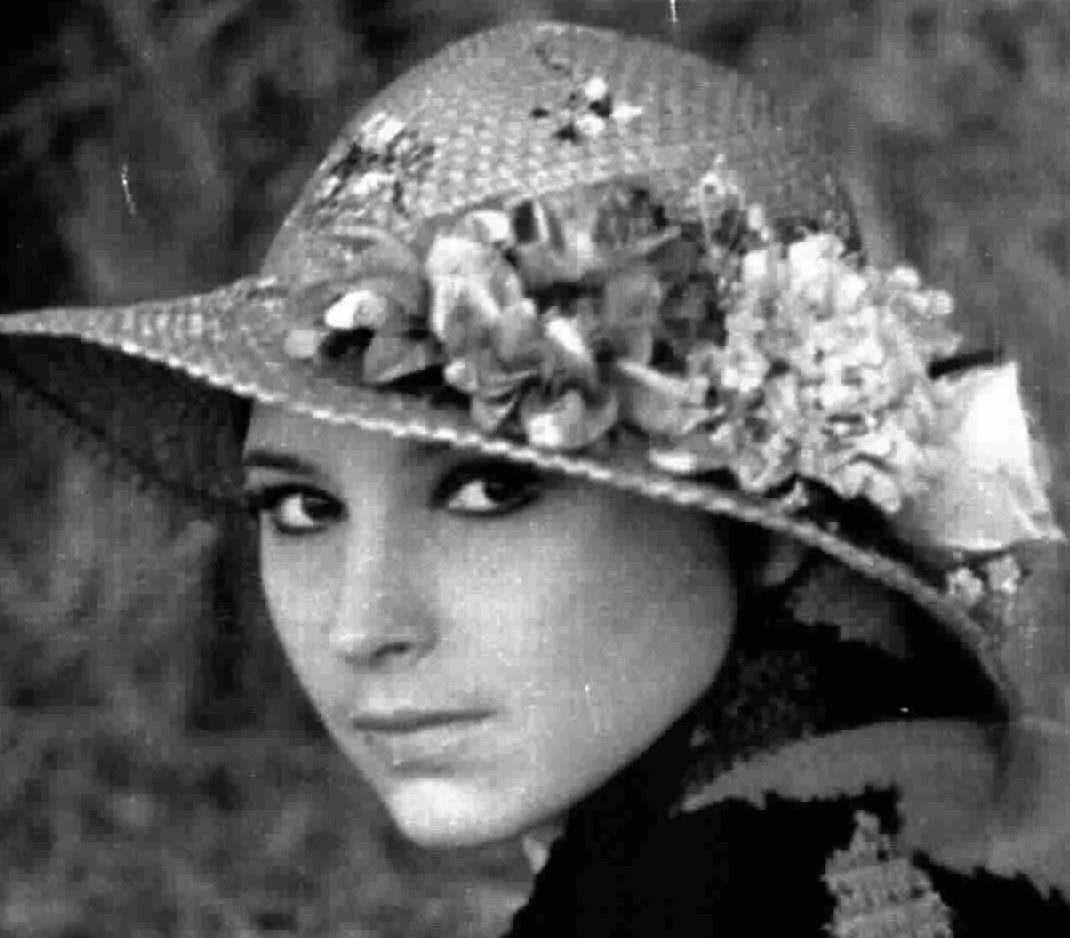
- Born: 24 August 1954 (age 71); Naples, Italy
- Occupation: Actress

Lina Polito (born 24 August 1954) is an Italian actress.

Born in Naples, Italy, Polito started her career on stage with Eduardo De Filippo. She made her film debut in 1973, with Lina Wertmüller's Love and Anarchy, and for this performance she was awarded with a Nastro d'Argento for Best New Actress.

Her other film credits included roles in All Screwed Up (1974), I'll Take Her Like a Father (1974), The Peaceful Age (1974), Salvo D'Acquisto (1975) and the Nazisploitation film Deported Women of the SS Special Section (1976). In 1975 she acted in the TV mini-series Il marsigliese by Giacomo Battiato.

In 1983 she won a David di Donatello for Best Supporting Actress for her performance in Massimo Troisi's Scusate il ritardo.
