= Picchio dal pozzo (album) =

Picchio dal Pozzo

Studio album by Picchio dal Pozzo
- Released: 1976
- Genre: Italian progressive rock
- Label: Grog

Picchio dal Pozzo chronology
Picchio dal Pozzo (1976)	Abbiamo tutti i suoi problemi (1980)

Picchio dal Pozzo is the debut album by the Italian progressive rock band Picchio dal Pozzo, released in 1976.

The album was released on vinyl in 1976 by Grog Records, a record label founded by Aldo De Scalzi, the band's leader. A work of Italian progressive rock, it also reflects influence of Canterbury scene bands as Soft Machine and Gong. The album has been noted for its use of keyboards and horns, as well as its surreal lyrics and unusual vocal effects.

The album is dedicated to Robert Wyatt and the opening track "Merta" closely follows the melodic line of Wyatt's "Sea Song" from his 1974 album Rock Bottom.

== Track listing ==
Side A ("Hay Fay")

1. "Merta"
2. "Cocomelastico"
3. "Seppia"
3a. "Sottotitolo"
3b. "Frescofresco"
3c. "Rusf"
4. "Bofonchia"

Side B ("Fay Hay")

5. "Napier"
6. "La floricultura di Tschincinnata"
7. "La bolla"
8. "Off"

== Personnel ==
- Andrea Beccari — bass, horn, voice
- Aldo De Scalzi — keyboard, voice
- Paolo Griguolo — guitar, voice
- Giorgio Karaghiosoff — percussion

== See also ==
- Italian progressive rock
- Canterbury scene
