= Odd Squad (disambiguation) =

Odd Squad is an American-Canadian television series.

Odd Squad or The Odd Squad may also refer to:

- Odd Squad (film), a 1981 Italian war comedy film
- "The Odd Squad" (episode), an episode of The Fairly OddParents
- The former name of the Coughee Brothaz, a Southern hip-hop group
