= Divorzio a Las Vegas =

2020 Italian comedy film

- Film poster
- Directed by: Umberto Carteni
- Written by: Alessandro Pondi; Paolo Logli; Riccardo Irrera; Mauro Graiani
- Starring: Giampaolo Morelli; Andrea Delogu; Ricky Memphis; Grazia Schiavo; Gianmarco Tognazzi
- Cinematography: Emanuele Zarlenga
- Edited by: Graziano Falzone
- Music by: Pasquale Catalano
- Release date: 8 October 2020
- Running time: 90 minutes
- Country: Italy
- Language: Italian

Divorzio a Las Vegas (lit. 'Divorce in Las Vegas') is a 2020 Italian comedy film directed by Umberto Carteni.

== Distribution ==
The film was released by 01 Distribution in cinemas from 8 October 2020.

== Cast ==
- Giampaolo Morelli as Lorenzo
- Andrea Delogu as Elena
- Ricky Memphis as Lucio
- Grazia Schiavo as Sara
- Gianmarco Tognazzi as Giannandrea
- Luca Vecchi as Tullio
- Desirée Popper as Silvia
- Vincent Riotta
