= No Thanks, Coffee Makes Me Nervous =

- Directed by: Lodovico Gasparini
- Written by: Massimo Troisi; Lello Arena; Michael Pergolani; Stefano Vespignani
- Starring: Lello Arena
- Cinematography: Pasquale Rachini
- Edited by: Antonio Siciliano
- Music by: James Senese
- Distributed by: Variety Distribution
- Release date: 1982
- Language: Italian

No Thanks, Coffee Makes Me Nervous (Italian: No grazie, il caffè mi rende nervoso) is a 1982 Italian giallo-comedy film directed by Lodovico Gasparini.

== Plot ==
The first New Naples Festival is troubled by some unexplained events and by the menaces of a serial killer named Funiculì Funiculà. Two journalists, the shy Michele and the enterprising Lisa Sole, investigate.

== Cast ==
- Lello Arena: Michele Giuffrida
- Maddalena Crippa: Lisa Sole
- Massimo Troisi: Himself
- Armando Marra: Dieci Decimi
- Anna Campori: Miss Rosa
- James Senese: Himself
- Carlo Monni: Inspector Barra
- Sergio Solli: Mitomane

== See also ==
- List of Italian films of 1982
