= Seven Kilometers from Jerusalem =

- Directed by: Claudio Malaponti
- Written by: Claudio Malaponti; Graziano Prota
- Story by: Pino Farinotti
- Produced by: Graziano Prota; Angelo Sconda
- Starring: Luca Ward
- Cinematography: Alessandro Pesci; Mauro Marchetti
- Music by: Pivio and Aldo De Scalzi
- Release date: 2007
- Language: Italian

Seven Kilometers from Jerusalem or "7 Km da Gerusalemme" is a film about a Milanese ad exec having a midlife crisis who makes a pilgrimage to the Holy Land.

== Cast ==
- Luca Ward as Alessandro Forte
- Eleonora Brigliadori as Marta Piano
- Rosalinda Celentano as Sara
- Emanuela Rossi as Ginevra Santi
- Alessandro Haber as Angelo Profeti
- Isa Barzizza as Elvira Marenghi
- Alessandro Etrusco as Jesus
- Giovanna Nodari as Francesca
- Alessandra Barzaghi as Martina Marenghi
- Monica Ward as Irene Castelli
- Gianni Palladino as Giordano Bruni
- Tony Rucco as Diomede
- Pino Farinotti as Cesare Piano
- Paolo Limiti as Television Manager
- Elena Presti as Fabrizia

== See also ==
- List of Italian films of 2007
