= Pivio and Aldo De Scalzi =

Italian film composer duo

Pivio & Aldo De Scalzi
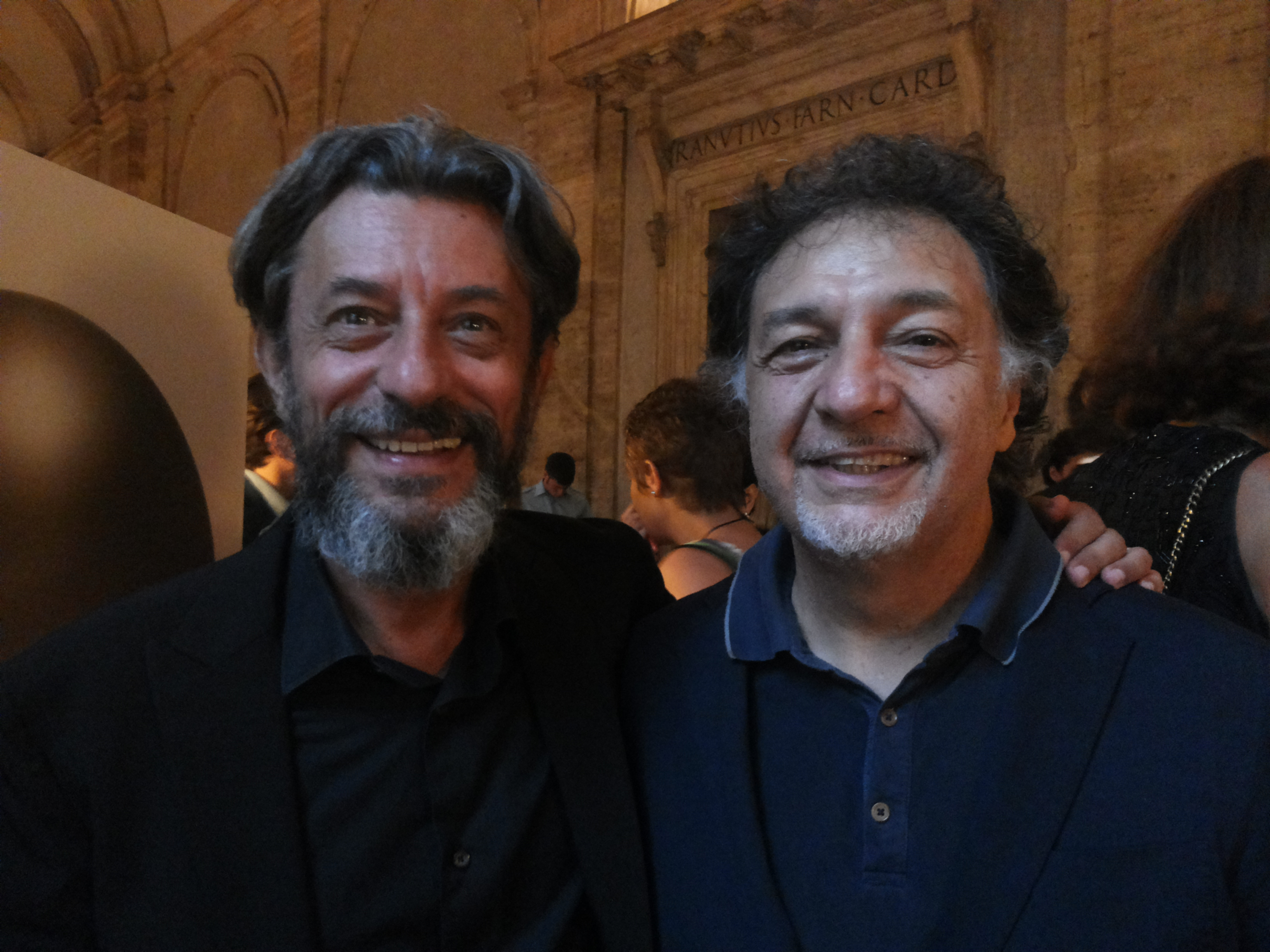
- Pivio and Aldo De Scalzi at Globi d'oro awards ceremony, 2014

Background information
- Also known as: Trancendental
- Genres: Film score, world, progressive rock, new wave
- Years active: 1991–present
- Labels: I dischi dell'espleta, Creuza srl
- Members: Pivio; Aldo De Scalzi
- Website: www.pivioealdodescalzi.com

Pivio (born 7 June 1958 in Genoa, Italy) and Aldo De Scalzi (born 23 January 1957 in Genoa, Italy) are two Italian composers, best known for scoring music for television and motion pictures. They are not siblings: Pivio is a pseudonym for Roberto Pischiutta, while Aldo De Scalzi is Vittorio De Scalzi's brother, founding member of New Trolls, an Italian progressive rock band. Aldo himself has written and composed many songs for New Trolls, including "Faccia di Cane", in competition at the popular Italian song contest Sanremo Music Festival in 1985. Moreover, in 1973 Aldo and Vittorio De Scalzi started together their own music studio, Studio G. and the record labels Magma and Grog Records, renowned for having hosted, during the 70s, the most talented bands from progressive rock Italian movement (New Trolls, Picchio dal Pozzo, Alphataurus, Pholas Dactilus, Latte e miele, Mandillo, Celeste, Sigillo di Horus). From 1976 on, Aldo starts playing with the progressive rock band Picchio dal Pozzo.

Meanwhile, in 1979 Pivio founded along with Marco Odino, the new wave band Scortilla, famous for the hit "Fahrenheit 451", in competition at the Italian music contest Festivalbar, in 1984 edition. Graduated with a degree in Electronic Engineering at Genova University, Pivio moved in Rome in the late 1980s. Pivio and Aldo De Scalzi started their collaboration during the 90s and throughout their career, have been in soundtrack work for various motion pictures, starting with Hamam (Il bagno Turco) directed by Ferzan Özpetek in 1997.

Moreover, in 1995 Pivio and Aldo De Scalzi started the side project Trancendental, developing their interest in Mediterranean world music, crossing Maghreb and Middle East musical traditions and in 2004 started the record label I dischi dell'espleta and the publishing company Creuza S.r.l.

== The duo ==
Pivio and Aldo De Scalzi met during the 1980s when Aldo happened to be the sound technician for a Scortilla's tour. Then, Aldo (with Danilo Madonia, who made many arrangements for, among the others, Renato Zero), produced "Fahrenheit 451", the Scortilla's album, released by Warner. The duo Pivio and Aldo De Scalzi were born officially in 1991. with their debut album Maccaia followed, in 1995, by Mirag in which they explore middle eastern sounds, which were developed more clearly in Deposizione (released in 1995, with the nickname of "Trancendental"); in this album there are echoes of the duo's musical bias: progressive rock and new wave.

== Film work ==
When film producer and director Marco Risi and his wife and actress Francesca D'Aloja listened to the album Deposizione, the couple decided to contact Pivio and Aldo De Scalzi to get them involved with a film project: Hamam, the directorial debut by Turkish-Italian filmmaker Ferzan Özpetek, produced by Marco Risi and starring Francesca D'Aloja and Alessandro Gassman. The duo composed in twelve days the original motion picture soundtrack, inspired by Turkish musical tradition and melting ancient with more contemporary sounds. In 1997 Hamam was screened in the Quinzaine des Réalisateurs section at 50º Cannes Film Festival, where gained audience and film critics attention. Released in Italy by Italian film distribution company Filmauro, Hamam stayed in theaters for almost three months and the original soundtrack sold more than 300,000 copies. For Pivio and Aldo De Scalzi it was the very beginning of a long career as composers for motion pictures. Among the others, they scored for Outlaw, I giardini dell'Eden, Harem Suare, Casomai, El Alamein – The Line of Fire, Piano 17, Barbarossa, Complici del silenzio, We Can Do That, La peggiore settimana della mia vita, The Butterfly Room, Razzabastarda and for TV series Distretto di Polizia, L'ispettore Coliandro and Medicina generale. The duo has had a long association with directors Manetti Bros., composing the music for, among the others, Piano 17, L'ispettore Coliandro, The Arrival of Wang, Paura 3D, Song 'e Napule and the awarded musical Love and Bullets (2017 film).

== Filmography ==
Year	Film	Director
1997	Hamam	Ferzan Özpetek
1998	Le faremo tanto male	Pino Quartullo
1998	The Scent of the Night	Claudio Caligari
1998	Viola Kisses Everybody	Giovanni Veronesi
1998	The Second Wife	Ugo Chiti
1998	The Garden of Eden	Alessandro D'Alatri
1998	Elvjs & Merilijn	Armando Manni
1998	Il delitto di via Monte Parioli	Antonio Bonifacio
1998	Marriages	Cristina Comencini
1999	I fobici	Giancarlo Scarchilli
1999	I fetentoni	Alessandro Di Robilant
1999	Harem Suare	Ferzan Özpetek
1999	Outlaw	Enzo Monteleone
2001	The Dangerous Sex Date	Maria Martinelli
2001	Lupo mannaro	Antonio Tibaldi
2001	Nella terra di nessuno	Gianfranco Giagni
2001	Blek Giek	Enrico Caria
2001	Se fossi in te	Giulio Manfredonia
2002	Turno di notte	Carmen Giardina
2002	Nati stanchi (additional music)	Dominick Tambasco
2002	The Best Day of My Life (additional music)	Cristina Comencini
2002	The Boys from El Alamein	Enzo Monteleone
2002	El Alamein: The Line of Fire	Enzo Monteleone
2002	Casomai	Alessandro D'Alatri
2003	Uncut	Jonathan Zarantonello
2003	Per sempre	Alessandro Di Robilant
2004	E' già ieri (additional music)	Giulio Manfredonia
2004	Three Days of Anarchy	Vito Zagarrio
2005	The Person de Leo N.	Alberto Vendemmiati
2006	Ice on Fire (additional music)	Umberto Marino
2006	Seven Kilometers from Jerusalem	Claudio Malaponti
2006	The Stone Merchant	Renzo Martinelli
2006	Piano 17	Manetti Bros.
2006	Maradona, the Hand of God	Marco Risi
2007	Vedi Napoli e poi muori	Enrico Caria
2007	Dark resurrection(additional music)	Angelo Licata
2007	Last minute Marocco	Francesco Falaschi
2007	Carnera - The Walking Mountain	Renzo Martinelli
2008	The Early Bird Catches the Worm	Francesco Patierno
2008	We Can Do That	Giulio Manfredonia
2009	Complici del silenzio	Stefano Incerti
2009	Hollywood on the Tiber	Marco Spagnoli
2009	Barbarossa - Sword of War	Renzo Martinelli
2009	Cavie	Manetti Bros.
2010	Left by the ship	Alberto Vendemmiati, Emma Rossi Landi
2011	Qualunquemente (additional music)	Giulio Manfredonia
2011	L'infiltré	Giacomo Battiato
2011	Questo mondo è per te	Francesco Falaschi
2011	Some Say No	Gianbattista Avellino
2011	Hollywood invasion	Marco Spagnoli
2011	Box Office – 3D	Ezio Greggio
2011	L'era legale	Enrico Caria
2011	The Arrival of Wang	Manetti Bros.
2011	Giovanna Cau - Diversamente giovane	Marco Spagnoli
2011	The Worst Week of My Life	Alessandro Genovesi
2011	Seven Footprints to Satan	Benjamin Christensen (1929)
2012	A wild awakening	Fulvio Ottaviano
2012	The Butterfly Room	Jonathan Zarantonello
2012	All'ultima spiaggia	Gianluca Ansanelli
2012	Giuliano Montaldo - Four Times Twenty	Marco Spagnoli
2012	E la vita continua	Pino Quartullo
2012	Fratelli minori	Carmen Giardina
2012	The Worst Christmas of My Life	Alessandro Genovesi
2012	The Mongrel	Alessandro Gassman
2013	Anna Magnani a Hollywood	Marco Spagnoli
2013	Essere Riccardo ... e gli altri	Giancarlo Scarchilli
2013	Monk with a camera	Guido Santi and Tina Mascara
2014	Amori elementari	Sergio Basso
2014	Eppideis	Matteo Andreolli
2014	Song'e Napule	Manetti Bros.
2014	The sweepers	Igor Maltagliati
2015	Le frise ignoranti	Antonello De Leo and Pietro Loprieno
2015	Game therapy	Ryan Travis
2016	Ustica	Renzo Martinelli
2016	L'uomo che non cambio la storia	Enrico Caria
2016	The long march	Sergio Basso
2017	The startup	Alessandro D'Alatri
2017	Love and Bullets (2017 film)	Manetti Bros.
2018	Favola	Sebastiano Mauri
2018	Il tuttofare	Valerio Attanasio
2018	Restiamo amici	Antonello Grimaldi
2019	Un'avventura	Marco Danieli
2020	Tell Me Who I Am	Sergio Basso
2020	Thou Shalt Not Hate	Mauro Mancini
2021	Il silenzio grande	Alessandro Gassmann
2021	Diabolik	Manetti Bros.
2022	Belli Ciao	Gennaro Nunziante
2022	Il filo invisibile	Marco Simon Puccioni
2022	Io & Spotty	Cosimo Gomez
2022	Diabolik 2 - Ginko all'attacco	Manetti Bros.

== Pivio solo filmography ==
Year	Film	Director
1996	Cold ground	Guido Santi
2001	Non dire gatto	Giorgio Tirabassi
2005	Il bastardo e l'handicappato	Giampaolo Morelli
2007	Sleeping around (with Danilo Madonia)	Marco Carniti
2007	Dora	Sergio Basso
2012	Paura – 3D	Manetti Bros.
2014	Macabrus	Manetti Bros.
2014	Murder Inc.	Francesco Bovino
2016	It's fine anyway	Marcello Saurino and Pivio
2019	The wisdom tooth	Gregorio Sassoli
2020	Il caso Braibanti	Carmen Giardina and Massimiliano Palmese
2021	Nothin' at all	Matteo Malatesta
2022	B-Movie	Matteo Malatesta

== Film TV and TV-series ==
Year	Film	Director
2000	La voce del sangue	Alessandro Di Robilant
2000	Distretto di Polizia I	Renato De Maria
2001	Distretto di Polizia II	Antonello Grimaldi
2002	Per Amore	Peter Exacoustos and Carmela Cicinnati
2002	Distretto di Polizia III	Monica Vullo
2003	Questo amore	Luca Manfredi
2003	Distretto di Polizia IV	Monica Vullo
2004	Noi	Peter Exacoustos
2004	Il tunnel della libertà	Enzo Monteleone
2004	Il giorno del lupo – L'ispettore Coliandro 1	Manetti Bros.
2005	In trappola – L'ispettore Coliandro 1	Manetti Bros.
2005	Magia nera – L'ispettore Coliandro 1	Manetti Bros.
2005	Vendetta cinese – L'ispettore Coliandro 1	Manetti Bros.
2005	Ho sposato un calciatore	Stefano Sollima
2005	Der Todestunnel	Dominique Othenin-Girard
2005	Distretto di Polizia V	Lucio Gaudino
2006	Il giudice Mastrangelo	Enrico Oldoini
2006	Distretto di polizia VI	Antonello Grimaldi
2006	Il bambino e la befana	Manetti Bros.
2006	Rapidamente	Manetti Bros.
2006	Morte di un confidente	Manetti Bros.
2007	Il giudice Mastrangelo 2	Enrico Oldoini
2007	Distretto di polizia VII	Alessandro Capone
2007	L’uomo della carità	Alessandro Di Robilant
2007	Medicina generale	Renato de Maria
2008	Distretto di Polizia VIII	Alessandro Capone
2008	Il coraggio di Angela	Luciano Manuzzi
2008	Anna e i cinque	Monica Vullo
2008	Mai rubare a casa dei ladri – L'ispettore Coliandro 2	Manetti Bros.
2008	La pistola – L'ispettore Coliandro 2	Manetti Bros.
2008	Doppia rapina – L'ispettore Coliandro 2	Manetti Bros.
2008	Sesso e segreti – L'ispettore Coliandro 2	Manetti Bros.
2009	Distretto di Polizia IX	Alberto Ferrari
2009	Medicina generale 2	Luca Ribuoli and Francesco Micciché
2009	Un caso di coscienza 4	Luigi Perelli
2009	Il sospetto – L'ispettore Coliandro 3	Manetti Bros.
2009	Sangue in facoltà – L'ispettore Coliandro 3	Manetti Bros.
2009	Sempre avanti – L'ispettore Coliandro 3	Manetti Bros.
2009	Cous cous alla bolognese – L'ispettore Coliandro 3	Manetti Bros.
2009	Moana	Alfredo Peyretti
2009	666 – L'ispettore Coliandro 4	Manetti Bros.
2009	Anomalia 21 – L'ispettore Coliandro 4	Manetti Bros.
2010	Distretto di Polizia X	Alberto Ferrari
2010	I delitti del cuoco	Alessandro Capone
2011	Un Natale per due	Giambattista Avellino
2011	Walter Chiari	Enzo Monteleone
2011	Distretto di Polizia XI	Alberto Ferrari
2012	Natale Coi Fiocchi	Giambattista Avellino
2014	Rex 7	Manetti Bros.
2015	L'angelo di Sarajevo	Enzo Monteleone
2015	Max and Hélène	Giacomo Battiato
2015	Rex 8	Manetti Bros.
2016	Black Mamba – L'ispettore Coliandro 5	Manetti Bros.
2016	Testimone da proteggere – L'ispettore Coliandro 5	Manetti Bros.
2016	Salsa e merengue – L'ispettore Coliandro 5	Manetti Bros.
2016	Doppia identità – L'ispettore Coliandro 5	Manetti Bros.
2016	Tassista notturno – L'ispettore Coliandro 5	Manetti Bros.
2016	Cop Killer – L'ispettore Coliandro 5	Manetti Bros.
2016	Io non mi arrendo	Enzo Monteleone
2016	Fuoco amico – Task force 45	Beniamino Catena
2017	Mortal Club – L'ispettore Coliandro 6	Manetti Bros.
2017	Partita speciale – L'ispettore Coliandro 6	Manetti Bros.
2017	Il team – L'ispettore Coliandro 6	Manetti Bros.
2017	Corri, Coliandro, corri – L'ispettore Coliandro 6	Manetti Bros.
2017	Smartphone – L'ispettore Coliandro 6	Manetti Bros.
2017	La fine del mondo – L'ispettore Coliandro 6	Manetti Bros.
2018	Tutto il mondo è paese	Giulio Manfredonia
2018	Duisburg	Enzo Monteleone
2018	Yakuza – L'ispettore Coliandro 7	Manetti Bros.
2018	Serial killer – L'ispettore Coliandro 7	Manetti Bros.
2018	Vai col liscio – L'ispettore Coliandro 7	Manetti Bros.
2018	Caccia grossa – L'ispettore Coliandro 7	Manetti Bros.
2019	Dottoressa Gio	Antonello Grimaldi
2019	Illuminate 2	Different Directors
2020	Storia di Nilde	Emanuele Imbucci
2020	Illuminate 3	Different Directors
2021	Masantonio	Fabio Mollo
2021	Il fantasma – L'ispettore Coliandro 8	Manetti Bros.
2021	Tesoro nascosto – L'ispettore Coliandro 8	Manetti Bros.
2021	Intrigo maltese – L'ispettore Coliandro 8	Manetti Bros.
2021	Kabir Bedi – L'ispettore Coliandro 8	Manetti Bros.

== Theatre ==
Year	Play	Director
1999	K2	Edoardo Erba
2001	Junun	Fadhel Jaibi
2002	La forza dell'abitudine	Alessandro Gassmann
2003	Le crociate viste dagli arabi	Consuelo Barillaro
2004	Infernetto	Giorgio Tirabassi
2006	Corps otages	Fadhel Jaibi
2008/2009	La parola ai giurati	Alessandro Gassmann
2010	L’ebreo	Enrico Maria Lamanna
2010	Roman e il suo cucciolo	Alessandro Gassmann
2010	Immanuel Kant	Alessandro Gassmann
2013	Riccardo III	Alessandro Gassmann
2014	7 minuti	Alessandro Gassmann
2015	Qualcuno volò sul nido del cuculo	Alessandro Gassmann
2015	La pazza della porta accanto	Alessandro Gassmann
2018	Fronte del porto	Alessandro Gassmann
2019	Il silenzio grande	Alessandro Gassmann
2020	After the end	Marco Puccioni
2022	Racconti disumani	Alessandro Gassmann

== Awards and nominations ==
=== David di Donatello ===
Year	Nominee / work	Award	Result
2000	Outlaw	Best Original Score	Nominated
2003	Casomai	Best Original Score	Nominated
2009	We Can Do That	Best Original Score	Nominated
2013	Razzabastarda	Best Song	Nominated
2014	Song'e Napule	Best Original Score	Won
2018	Love and Bullets	Best Original Song	Won
2018	Love and Bullets	Best Original Score	Won
2021	Non odiare	Best Original Song	Nominated
2021	Non odiare	Best Composer	Nominated
2022	Diabolik	Best Composer	Nominated

=== Nastri d'Argento ===
Year	Nominee / work	Award	Result
1997	Hamam	Best Original Score	Nominated
1999	Elvjs & Merilijn	Best Original Score	Nominated
2002	Casomai	Best Original Score	Nominated
2007	Piano 17	Best Original Score	Nominated
2007	Maradona, the Hand of God	Best Original Score	Nominated
2009	We Can Do That	Best Original Score	Nominated
2009	Complici del silenzio	Best Original Score	Nominated
2013	Razzabastarda	Best Original Score	Nominated
2014	Song'e Napule	Best Original Score	Won
2015	Le frise ignoranti	Best Original Song	Nominated
2018	Love and Bullets	Best Original Score	Won
2018	Love and Bullets	Best Original Song	Won
2021	Non Odiare	Best Original Score	Nominated
2022	Diabolik	Best Original Score	Nominated
2022	Il silenzio grande	Best Original Score	Nominated

=== Bif&st - Bari International Film Festival ===
Year	Nominee / work	Award	Result
2014	Song'e Napule	Ennio Morricone Award - Best Original Score	Won
2018	Love and Bullets	Ennio Morricone Award - Best Original Score	Won

=== Ciak d'oro ===
Year	Nominee / work	Award	Result
2000	Harem Suare	Best Original Score	Nominated
2006	Piano 17	Best Original Score	Nominated
2013	Razzabastarda	Ciak d'oro for Best Original Score and Best Song	Nominated
2018	Love and Bullets	Best Song	Won
2018	Love and Bullets	Best Original Score	Won
2021	Il silenzio grande	Best Original Score	Nominated
2021	Non odiare	Best Song	Nominated

=== Globo d'oro ===
Year	Nominee / work	Award	Result
1997	Hamam	Best Original Score	Won
1998	Elvjs & Merilijn	Best Original Score	Nominated
2009	We Can Do That	Best Original Score	Nominated
2013	Razzabastarda	Best Original Score	Nominated
2014	Song 'e Napule	Best Original Score	Won
2018	Love and Bullets	Best Original Score	Nominated

=== Premio Roma VideoClip ===
Year	Nominee / work	Award	Result
2011	The Arrival of Wang	Best Original Score	Won
2013	Razzabastarda	Best Original Score	Won

=== Soundtrack Stars Award ===
Year	Nominee / work	Award	Result
2017	Love and Bullets	Best Italian Score	Won

=== Premio FICE ===
Year	Nominee / work	Award	Result
2009	Complici del silenzio	Best Original Score	Won
2009	We Can Do That	Best Original Score	Won

=== Ciliegia d'Oro ===
Year	Nominee / work	Award	Result
2009	We Can Do That	Best Original Score	Won
2018	Love and Bullets	Best Original Score	Won

=== BAFF ===
Year	Nominee / work	Award	Result
2007	Seven Kilometers from Jerusalem	Best Original Score	Won

=== Premio Fellini ===
Year	Nominee / work	Award	Result
2002	El Alamein - The Line of Fire	Best Original Score	Won

=== Premio Musica de Andalusia ===
Year	Nominee / work	Award	Result
2000	Hamam	Best Original Score	Won

=== Antalya Golden Orange Film Festival ===
Year	Nominee / work	Award	Result
1997	Hamam	Best Original Score	Won
