= Hamam (film) =

1997 Italian-Turkish-Spanish film

- Directed by: Ferzan Özpetek
- Written by: Ferzan Özpetek
- Produced by: Roberto Manni
- Starring: Alessandro Gassmann; Francesca D'Aloja; Halil Ergün; Şerif Sezer; Mehmet Günsür; Carlo Cecchi
- Cinematography: Pasquale Mari
- Edited by: Mauro Bonanni
- Music by: Pivio and Aldo De Scalzi
- Distributed by: Strand Releasing
- Release date: 1997
- Running time: 94 minutes
- Countries: Italy; Turkey; Spain
- Languages: Italian; Turkish

Hamam (Italian: Il bagno turco, also known as Steam: The Turkish Bath) is a 1997 Italian–Turkish–Spanish film directed by Ferzan Özpetek about the powerful transformations certain places can cause in people.

== Synopsis ==
Francesco (Alessandro Gassman) and Marta (Francesca d'Aloja) are an uptight Rome couple running a small design firm. Their marriage, once the most important thing to both, has lost all meaning. Francesco loses interest in Marta, prompting her to start an affair with Paolo, their business partner.

Francesco's aunt Anita, the black sheep of the family, dies in Istanbul, where Francesco goes to try to sell the property he has inherited as quickly as possible.

The family who had managed the property under Anita's supervision and direction welcomes him with hospitality, but they are concerned about what the future holds for them. Their young son Mehmet (Mehmet Günsür) is particularly eager to show their handsome guest around.

When Francesco discovers the property includes a derelict hamam, a Turkish bath, he instead decides to restore the hamam and reopen it to the public. During the restoration, he starts a relationship with Mehmet.

Meanwhile, Marta arrives in Istanbul to get a speedy divorce from Francesco, but she is taken aback when she realizes how much Francesco has changed from his old self: both the hamam and Mehmet's unconditional affection were just what he needed, giving him back a purpose in life. Marta falls in love with him again, causing Rome and the divorce to lose importance for her.

Francesco's unwillingness to sell the property makes him enemies, some of whom ultimately murder him.

Marta decides to stay in Istanbul and run the hamam, the final scene suggesting she has turned into a second Anita.

== Cast ==
- Alessandro Gassman as Francesco
- Francesca d'Aloja as Marta
- Carlo Cecchi as Oscar
- Halil Ergün as Osman
- Serif Sezer as Perran
- Mehmet Günsür as Mehmet
- Basak Köklükaya as Fusun
- Alberto Molinari as Paolo
- Zozo Toledo as Zozo
- Ludovica Modugno as Voice of Aunt Anita (voice)

Other cast members; Zerrin Arbas, Necdet Mahfi Ayral, Murat Ilker and Alper Kul
