= Picchio dal Pozzo =

Italian rock band formed in 1976

- Origin: Genoa, Liguria, Italy
- Genres: Progressive rock, italian progressive rock, avant-prog
- Years active: 1973–present
- Labels: Grog, King, Crime, L' Orchestra, Cuneiform
- Members: Aldo De Scalzi; Paolo Griguolo; Andrea Beccari; Roberto Romani; Aldo Di Marco
- Past members: Giorgio Karaghiosoff; Claudio Lugo

Picchio dal Pozzo are an Italian progressive rock band formed in Genoa in 1976.

== Biography ==
The activity of Picchio dal Pozzo has been quite erratic, with five albums published over a period of about 40 years (1976-2011). The style of the band is quite unconventional for the Italian progressive rock scene, showing influences of both Canterbury scene and jazz rock/avantgarde acts (including Soft Machine, Henry Cow, and Frank Zappa). The (essentially meaningless) name "Picchio dal Pozzo" (literally: "Woodpecker from the Well") came up when one of the band members created an artwork depicting a knight in armour, with a feather on his helm, standing by a well; "Picchio dal Pozzo" was suggested as the name of that knight.

While the band never gained commercial success, their works are usually praised by critics. Their debut album, the eponymous Picchio dal Pozzo (1976, dedicated to Robert Wyatt) has been described as a "milestone of Italian rock music" and remains their most appreciated work.

Their second album Abbiamo tutti i suoi problemi moves even further into experimentation, and has been compared to Zappa, Henry Cow, The Muffins, and National Health.

After Abbiamo tutti i suoi problemi Picchio dal Pozzo disbanded. In the early 2000s, when many progressive rock bands from the 1970s were being "rediscovered" by revival-oriented labels, Picchio dal Pozzo's works were republished, along with a CD of unreleased material, published under the title Camere Zimmer Rooms. The band also reunited to play live in progressive rock events. In 2004, they published their first original recording since 1980, Picnic @ Valdapozzo, based on unreleased, readapted recordings featuring avantgarde/jazz singer Demetrio Stratos.

The band is still active and issued a live album in 2011.

== Lineup ==
- Aldo De Scalzi (1976–present): keyboards, percussions, vocals
- Paolo Griguolo (1976–present): guitar, vocals
- Giorgio Karaghiosoff (1976): saxophone, flute, percussions, vocals
- Andrea Beccari (1976–present): bass, vocals
- Claudio Lugo (1977–1979): saxophone, flute
- Roberto Romani (1977–present): saxophone, flute
- Aldo Di Marco (1977–present): drums, percussions

== Discography ==
- Picchio dal pozzo (Grog 1976)
- Abbiamo tutti i suoi problemi (L'Orchestra 1980)
- Camere Zimmer Rooms (Cuneiform 2001)
- Picnic @ Valdapozzo (Auditorium 2004)
- A_Live (Altrock 2011)
- In Camporella (Cuneiform 2023, live 2004)
