= Lello Arena =

Italian actor and comics writer

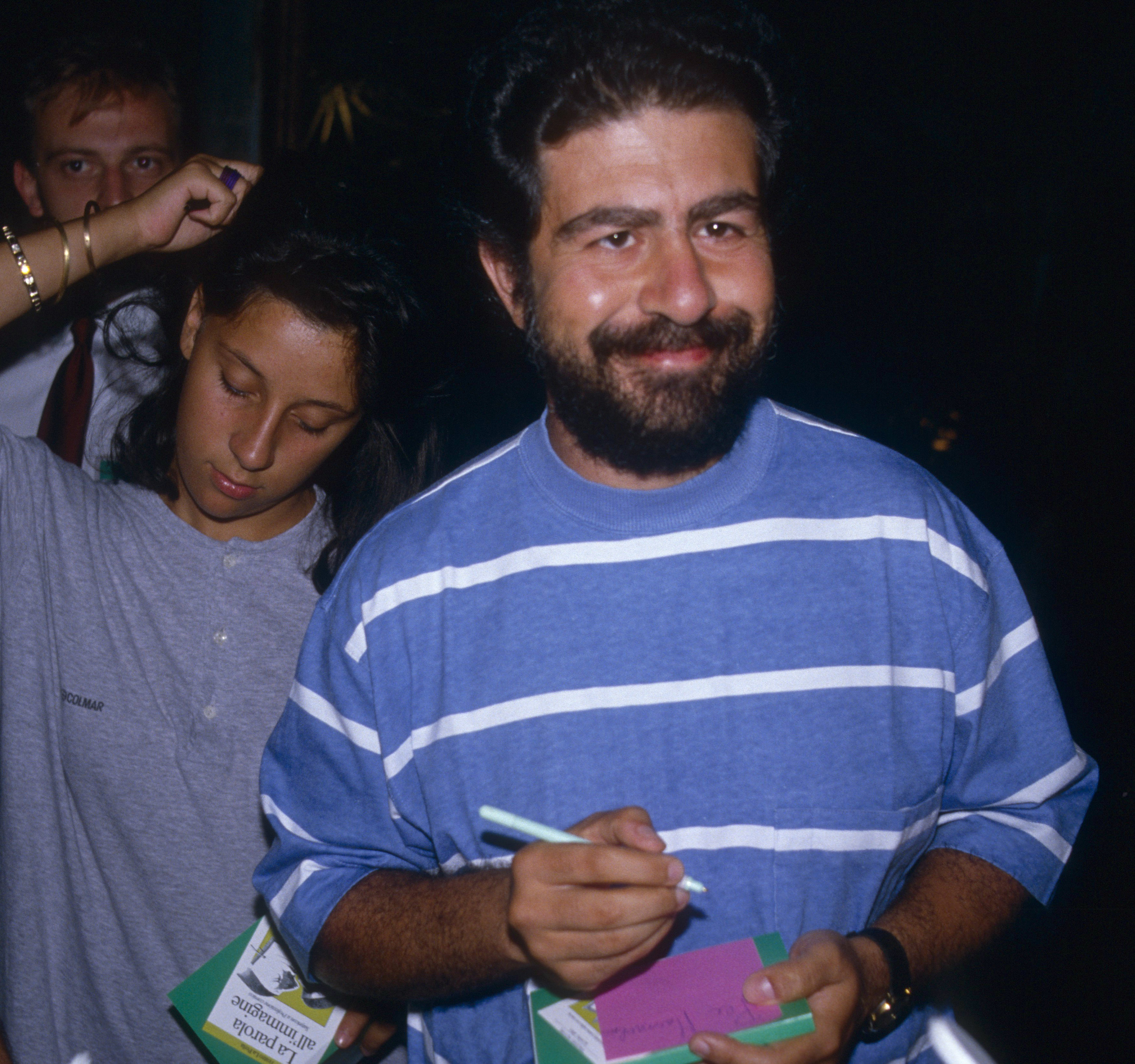
- Born: Raffaele Arena; 1 November 1953 (age 72); Naples, Campania, Italy
- Occupations: Actor & Comics writer
- Years active: 1970–present
- Height: 1.68 m (5 ft 6 in)
- Spouse: Francesca Taviani (m. 2006)
- Children: 1 son

Raffaele "Lello" Arena (born 1 November 1953) is an Italian actor and comics writer. He was also an occasional film director and screenwriter.

== Life and career ==
Born in Naples as Raffaele Arena, he was the son of two workers in a tobacco factory. In 1969, at a very young age, Arena formed the cabaret ensemble "La Smorfia" together with Massimo Troisi and Enzo Decaro. In 1978 and 1979, the group appeared in two RAI variety shows (Non stop and Luna Park) obtaining a great success. The group disbanded in 1980 and for some time Arena kept on collaborating with his friend Troisi, starring in his three first films. He won a David di Donatello for Best Supporting Actor for his performance in Troisi's Scusate il ritardo.

Later Arena focused his career on television, appearing in a large number of variety shows; he occasionally came back to cinema, even making his debut as a director in 1989 with Chiari di luna. He is also active on stage.

Arena also worked as a comics writer, notably for Lupo Alberto and Topolino.

== Filmography ==
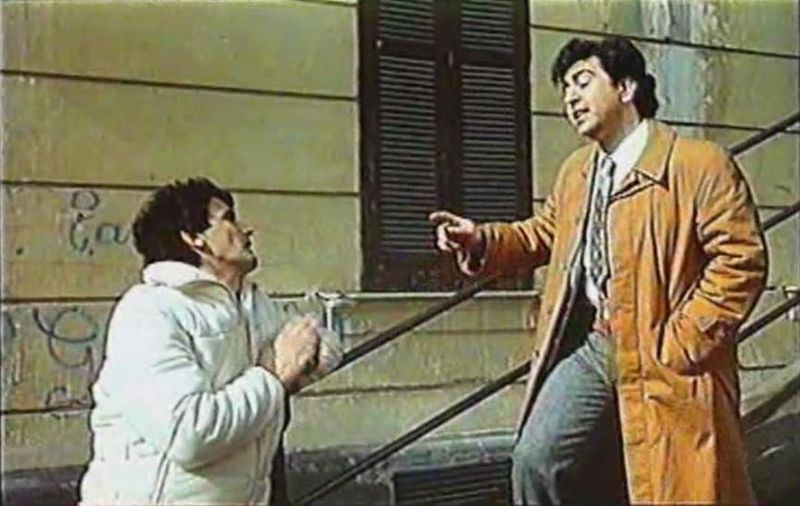
Massimo Troisi and Arena in Scusate il ritardo (1982)

Year	Title	Role	Notes
1981	I'm Starting from Three	Raffaele 'Rafè' Sodano, aka Lello	
1982	No Thanks, Coffee Makes Me Nervous	Michele Giuffrida	
1983	Scusate il ritardo	Tonino	
1984	Cuori nella tormenta	Raffaele Cuoco	
1984	Bertoldo, Bertoldino e Cacasenno	King Alboino	
1987	Il coraggio di parlare	Don Angelo	
1988	Chiari di luna	Davide Ruffo	
1995	Facciamo paradiso	Calabrone	
1998	You Laugh	Rocco	(segment "Due sequestri")
2003	Totò Sapore e la magica storia della pizza	Pulcinella	Voice
2008	Ho ammazzato Berlusconi		
2011	Rien Va	Custode	
2014	La scuola più bella del mondo	Arturo Moscariello	
2015	Wondrous Boccaccio	Duca Tancredi	
2017	Veleni	Melograno	
2018	Quando sarò bambino		
