= Francesca D'Aloja =

Italian film, television, and stage actress

- Born: 21 April 1963 (age 63); Rome, Italy
- Occupations: Actress; writer

Francesca D'Aloja (born 21 April 1963) is an Italian actress and screenwriter.

== Life and career ==
Born in Rome, D'Aloja started her career as a theater actress. In cinema, after several secondary roles, she made her debut as main actress in 1992, in the comedy film Quando eravamo repressi. In 1998 she was nominated to Globo d'oro for best actress thanks to her performance in Ferzan Özpetek's Hamam. D'Aloja is married to the director and screenwriter Marco Risi.

== Filmography ==
=== Film ===
Year	Title	Role	Notes
1984	Amarsi un po'	Surfer's girlfriend	Uncredited
1985	Casablanca, Casablanca	Young girl	Uncredited
1988	Apartment Zero	Claudia	
1990	Stasera a casa di Alice	Chicca	
1992	When We Were Repressed	Isabella	
1992	Per quel viaggio in Sicilia	Giulia	
1992	Infelici e contenti	Ornella	
1993	Bonus malus	Paola	
1993	The Escort	Anna Spano	
1997	Hamam	Marta	
1998	Kaputt Mundi	Lisa Faraone	
1998	The Dinner	Alessandra	
1998	The Scent of the Night	Fake rich woman	Cameo
2000	Scarlet Diva	Margherita	
2001	Three Wives	Beatrice	
2002	Bell'amico	Angelica	
2003	Adored	Charlotte	
2007	All'amore assente	Iris	
2008	Your Whole Life Ahead of You	Audience member	Uncredited
2013	The Fifth Wheel	Giulia	

=== Television ===
Year	Title	Role	Notes
1990	A Season of Giants	Mona Lisa	Miniseries
2002	Il bello delle donne	Luna Tanverlani	5 episodes
