= The Garden of Eden (1998 film) =

- Directed by: Alessandro D'Alatri
- Cinematography: Federico Masiero
- Music by: Pivio and Aldo De Scalzi
- Release date: 1998
- Running time: 95 minutes

The Garden of Eden (Italian: I giardini dell'Eden) is a 1998 Italian drama film directed by Alessandro D'Alatri. It entered the competition at the 59th Venice International Film Festival, in which Kim Rossi Stuart won the Pasinetti Award.

== Cast ==
- Kim Rossi Stuart: Jeoshua
- Boris Terral: Jochanan
- Kassandra Voyagis: Miriam
- Saïd Taghmaoui: Aziz
- Jovanotti: Discepolo degli Esseni
- Massimo Ghini: Soldato romano
