= One Day More (film) =

- Film poster
- Italian: Il giorno in più
- Directed by: Massimo Venier
- Starring: Fabio Volo; Isabella Ragonese
- Cinematography: Paolo Carnera
- Edited by: Walter Fasano
- Music by: Paolo Buonvino; Giuliano Taviani
- Release dates: 28 November 2011 (Turin Film Festival); 2 December 2011 (Italy)
- Running time: 112 minutes
- Country: Italy
- Language: Italian

One Day More (Italian: Il giorno in più) is a 2011 Italian comedy film directed by Massimo Venier. The film is adapted from the novel of the same name written by Fabio Volo, star of the film alongside Isabella Ragonese. However, the film plot is quite different from the book, radically changing the concepts and development of it.

== Cast ==
- Fabio Volo: Giacomo Pasetti
- Isabella Ragonese: Michela
- Pietro Ragusa: Dante
- Stefania Sandrelli: Mother of Giacomo
- Roberto Citran: Ricardi
- Hassani Shapi: Chandry
- Camilla Filippi: Silvia
- Irene Ferri: Alice
- Luciana Littizzetto: Boldrini
- Lino Toffolo: Fausto
- Valeria Bilello: Alessia

== See also ==
- List of Italian films of 2011
