= Sul mare =

- Theatrical release poster
- Directed by: Alessandro D'Alatri
- Based on: In bilico sul by Anna Pavignano
- Produced by: Alessio Gramazio; Paolo Calabresi
- Starring: Martina Codecasa; Vincenzo Merolla
- Cinematography: Alessio Gelsini Torresi
- Edited by: Osvaldo Bargero
- Music by: Freaks
- Production companies: Buddy Gang; Warner Bros. Entertainment Italia
- Distributed by: Warner Bros. Pictures
- Release date: 2 April 2010
- Running time: 100 minutes
- Country: Italy
- Language: Italian
- Box office: $523,238

Sul mare is a 2010 Italian romantic drama film directed by Alessandro D'Alatri, based on the novel In bilico sul by Anna Pavignano.

== Cast ==
- Martina Codecasa as Martina
- Vincenzo Merolla as Salvatore's father
- Nunzia Schiano as Salvatore's mother
- Raffaele Vassallo as Capadiciuccio
- Adriana Marega as Silvana
- Anna Ferzetti as Woman from Milan
