= Different from Whom? =

- Directed by: Umberto Carteni
- Written by: Fabio Bonifacci
- Starring: Luca Argentero; Claudia Gerini; Filippo Nigro
- Cinematography: Marcello Montarsi
- Edited by: Consuelo Cartucci
- Music by: Massimo Nunzi
- Production company: Cattleya
- Distributed by: Universal Pictures
- Release date: March 20, 2009
- Running time: 100 minutes
- Language: Italian

Different from Whom? (Italian: Diverso da chi?) is a 2009 Italian comedy film directed by Umberto Carteni.

== Plot ==
Piero is a young openly gay left-wing politician who lives in Trieste with his boyfriend Remo. During his mayoral election campaign the party decides to also to run Adele, a Catholic and strict conservative politician, as deputy mayor. Piero and Adele will discover to be attracted to each other, causing a stir among the voters and the political opponents, and suddenly turning Piero's boyfriend Remo into the odd man out.

== Cast ==
- Luca Argentero as Piero
- Claudia Gerini as Adele
- Filippo Nigro as Remo
- Francesco Pannofino as Galeazzo
- Giuseppe Cederna as Serafini
- Antonio Catania as Corazza
- Rinaldo Rocco as Samuele
- Paolo Graziosi

== Reception ==
The film has been cited as an example of sexual fluidity in recent queer European cinema.

Different from Whom? was criticized by a panelist at the Melbourne Queer Film Festival as a film that was "made for straight audiences" and claimed that the film panders to heterosexuals who are uncomfortable with homosexuality.

== Awards ==
- 2009 - Globi d'oro
  - Best First Feature to Umberto Carteni
  - Nomination Best Comedy to Umberto Carteni

== See also ==
- List of Italian films of 2009
