= I'm Starting from Three =

1981 Italian comedy film by Massimo Troisi

- Directed by: Massimo Troisi
- Written by: Massimo Troisi; Anna Pavignano
- Produced by: Fulvio Lucisano
- Starring: Massimo Troisi; Lello Arena; Marco Messeri
- Cinematography: Sergio D'Offizi
- Edited by: Antonio Siciliano
- Music by: Pino Daniele
- Distributed by: IIF
- Release date: 5 March 1981
- Running time: 110 minutes
- Country: Italy
- Language: Italian

I'm Starting from Three (Italian: Ricomincio da tre) is a 1981 Italian comedy film directed by, co-written by, and starring Massimo Troisi in his film debut. The film was awarded with two David di Donatello awards for Best Film and Best Actor.

== Plot ==
Gaetano is a shy Neapolitan boy who lives in a southern-Italian city with his family: one brother, one sister, his mother and his father, an extremely Catholic man who has lost his right hand, and confides in a miracle by Madonna of the swords to get it back.

Tired and bored about the excessive provincialism of his "entourage", and his alienating job in a food factory, Gaetano decides to hitch-hike to the more modern and cosmopolitan city of Florence. There he meets a beautiful girl, Marta, and they fall in love. Gaetano sets at Marta's and is later joined by his old friend Lello, a clumsy and rotund boy, albeit very funny in his friendship with the protagonist.

One night at Marta's, while reading a manuscript, Marta reveals to be pregnant, and she's not sure that Gaetano is the child's father: Marta had a relationship with a teenager boy, and she sincerely tells the whole story to Gaetano, that gets sad and embittered, and goes back to Naples, officially for his sister's wedding, actually to clear his mind about the facts. There he discovers himself very in love with Marta and rejoins her back in Florence, accepting her child even if he's not sure of being the natural father.

== Cast ==
- Massimo Troisi: Gaetano
- Fiorenza Marchegiani: Marta
- Lello Arena: Lello
- Marco Messeri: The Madman
- Lino Troisi: Ugo, Gaetano's father
- Renato Scarpa: Robertino
- Jeanne Mas: Jeanne
