= Banda Osiris =

Italian composer

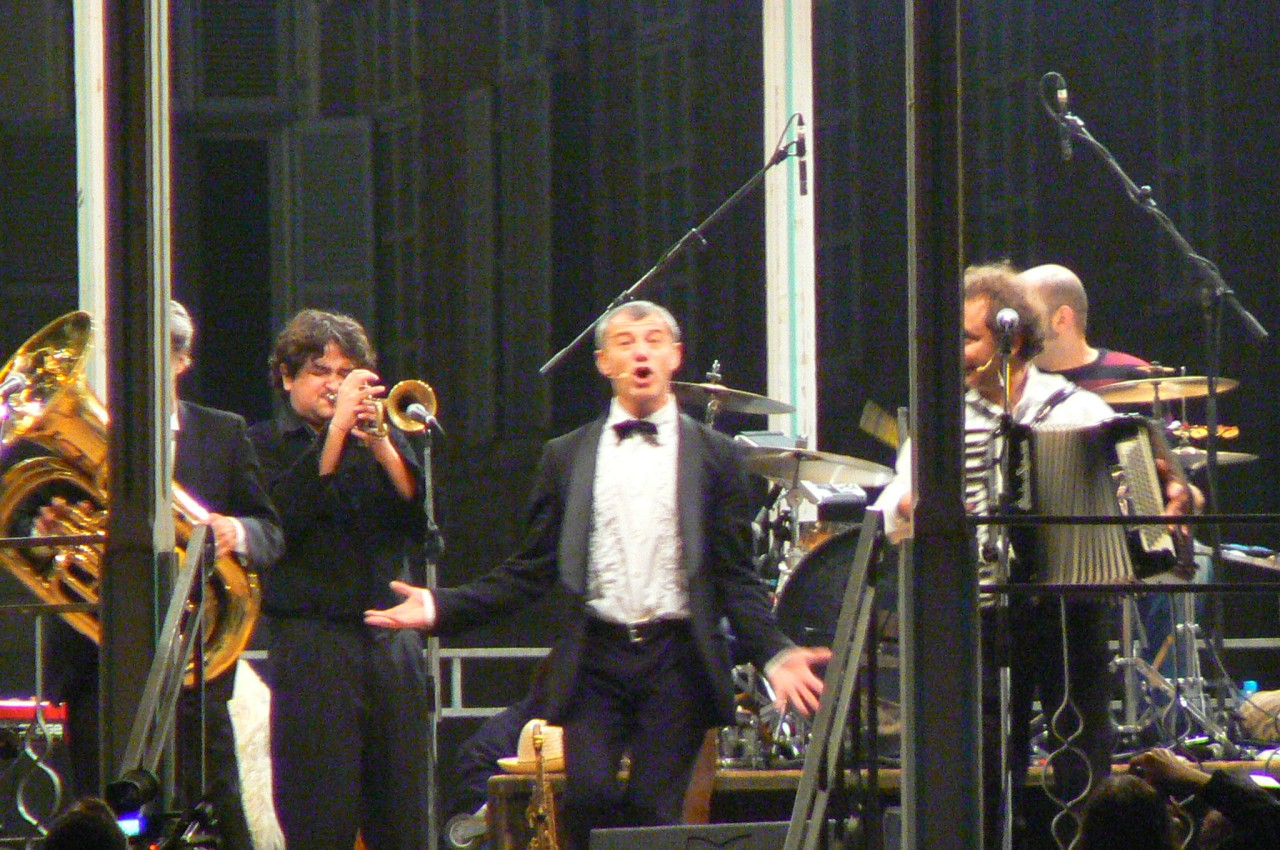

Background information
- Origin: Italy, Region of Piemonte
- Years active: 1980–currently
- Members: – Gianluigi Carlone: voice, flute, soprano sax – Roberto Carlone: bass, keyboard, trombone – Giancarlo Macrì: percussion, tuba – Sandro Berti: guitar, mandolin, trombone
- Past members: Gianluigi Carlone; Roberto Carlone; Giancarlo Macrì; Mario Sgotto

Banda Osiris are an Italian ensemble of musicians, actors and composers.

== Career ==
The group formed in 1980, in Vercelli. Their name is a pun/tribute to Italian revue soubrette, actress and singer Wanda Osiris. They initially started their career with street performances, mixing music, acting and comedy. With "Banda Osiris di Giorno" they debuted on stage, and through the theatrical dimension they had a growing success, especially with the shows "Storia della musica voll. 1 e 2", under the direction of Gabriele Salvatores, and "Sinfonia Fantastica" directed by Maurizio Nichetti.

The group composed and performed several musical film scores, winning the Silver Berlin Bear for Best Film Music as well as the David di Donatello for Best Score and the Nastro d'Argento in the same category for the Matteo Garrone's 2004 drama film First Love.

== Personnel ==
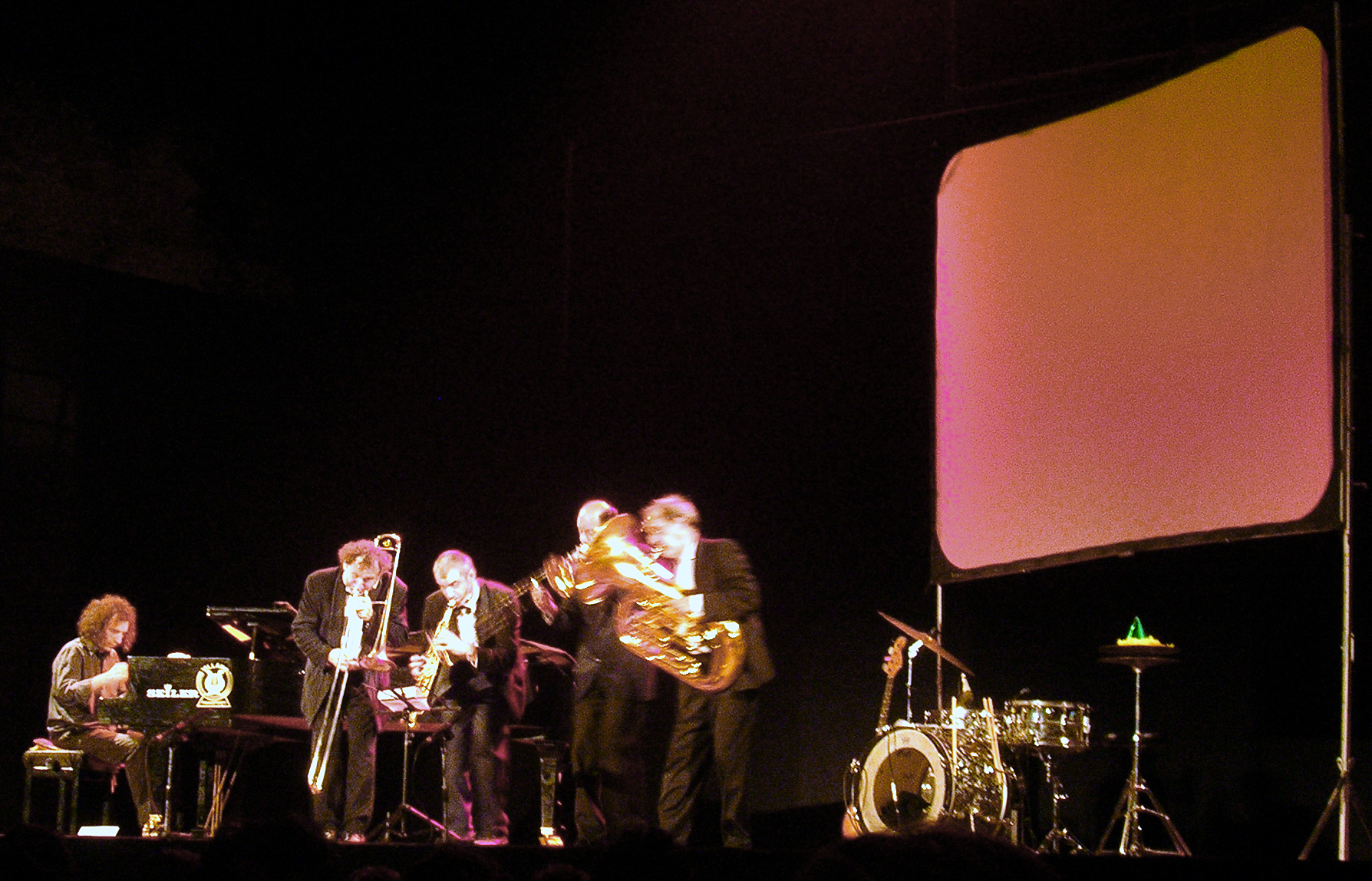
Concert with Stefano Bollani. Torre del Greco, 2005.

- Gianluigi Carlone: voice, flute, soprano sax
- Roberto Carlone: bass, keyboard, trombone
- Giancarlo Macrì: percussion, tuba
- Sandro Berti: guitar, mandolin, trombone

== Discography ==
Albums

- 1987 – Volume 1.2.3.4.5.6.7.8.9.10.11.12
- 2000 – Colonne sonore
- 2002 – Amore con la S maiuscola
- 2002 – L'imbalsamatore
- 2004 – Primo amore
- 2005 – Tartarughe sul dorso
- 2005 – Il cinema di Matteo Garrone
- 2006 – Anche libero va bene
- 2006 – Banda.25

DVD

- 2007 – Banda 25 – Lo spettacolo
- 2007 – Guarda che luna!
