= Studio illegale =

- Theatrical release poster
- Directed by: Umberto Carteni
- Written by: Federico Baccomo; Francesco Bruni; Umberto Carteni; Alfredo Covelli
- Produced by: Beppe Caschetto
- Starring: Fabio Volo; Zoé Félix
- Cinematography: Vladan Radovic
- Edited by: Cristiano Travaglioli
- Music by: Maxi Trusso
- Distributed by: Warner Bros. Pictures
- Release date: February 7, 2013
- Running time: 90 minutes
- Country: Italy
- Language: Italian

Studio illegale (lit. 'Outlaw firm') is a 2013 Italian comedy film co-written and directed by Umberto Carteni and starring Fabio Volo. It is based on a novel with the same name by Federico Baccomo.

== Plot ==
The lawyer Andrea Campi, in order to make a career, neglects his social life, often forgetting both his girlfriend and friends. His repetitive working days, however, are upset by a demanding task assigned to him by his boss, who puts him face to face with the lawyer Emilie Chomand, whom Andrea immediately falls in love with.

== Cast ==
- Fabio Volo as Andrea Campi
- Zoé Félix as Emilie Chomand
- Ennio Fantastichini as Giuseppe Sobreroni
- Nicola Nocella as Tiziano Tiraboschi
- Isa Barzizza as Zia Emma
- Erika Blanc as Zia Marta
- Luisella Boni as Moglie Carugato
- Adriano Braidotti as Giovannino
- Jean-Michel Dupuis as Antoine De Montcorbier
- Pino Micol as Severino Carugato
- Marina Rocco as Valentina

== See also ==
- List of Italian films of 2013
