= State buoni se potete =

- Directed by: Luigi Magni
- Written by: Luigi Magni; Bernardino Zapponi
- Cinematography: Danilo Desideri
- Edited by: Ruggero Mastroianni
- Music by: Angelo Branduardi
- Release date: 1983
- Country: Italy

State buoni se potete is a 1983 Italian historical comedy drama film written and directed by Luigi Magni. The film is loosely based on real life events of Saint Filippo Neri. For his musical score Angelo Branduardi won the David di Donatello for best score and the Nastro d'Argento in the same category.

== Cast ==
- Johnny Dorelli as Filippo Neri
- Philippe Leroy as Ignatius of Loyola
- Renzo Montagnani as Master Iacomo
- Mario Adorf as Pope Sixtus V
- Rodolfo Bigotti as Cirifischio
- Eurilla del Bono as Leonetta
- Roberto Farris as Young Cirifischio
- Federica Mastroianni as Young Leonetta
- Angelo Branduardi as Spiridione
- Marisa Traversi as Teresa of Ávila
- Piero Vivarelli as Carlo Borromeo
- Gianni Musy as The Prince
- Franco Javarone as Bargello
- Tiziana Pini as Prostitute
- Iris Peynado as The devil
- Giovanni Crippa as The Cardinal
