= Il mostro (1977 film) =

1977 film

- Italian theatrical release poster by Renato Casaro
- Directed by: Luigi Zampa
- Written by: Sergio Donati
- Produced by: Claudio Mancini
- Starring: Johnny Dorelli
- Cinematography: Mario Vulpiani
- Edited by: Franco Fraticelli
- Music by: Ennio Morricone
- Release date: 1977
- Running time: 94 minutes
- Country: Italy
- Language: Italian

Il mostro is a 1977 Italian thriller film directed by Luigi Zampa and starring Johnny Dorelli.

== Cast ==
- Johnny Dorelli as Valerio Barigozzi
- Sydne Rome as Dina
- Orazio Orlando as Commissioner Pisani
- Renzo Palmer as Baruffi
- Enzo Santaniello as Luca Barigozzi
- Renato Scarpa as Livraghi
- Yves Beneyton as Giorgio Mesca
- Gianrico Tedeschi as Vittorio Santi, "Grandpa Gustavo"
- Clara Colosimo as Donatella Domenica Donati
- Angelica Ippolito as Anna
