= Massimo Troisi: Somebody Down There Likes Me =

2023 Italian documentary film

- Theatrical release poster
- Directed by: Mario Martone
- Screenplay by: Anna Pavignano; Mario Martone
- Produced by: Fabrizio Donvito; Mauro Berardi; Benedetto Habib; Marco Cohen; Daniel Campos Pavoncelli; Giampaolo Letta; Massimiliano Orfei
- Starring: Francesco Piccolo; Anna Pavignano; Valeria Pezza; Goffredo Fofi
- Cinematography: Paolo Carnera
- Edited by: Jacopo Quadri
- Production companies: Indiana Production; Medusa Film; Vision Distribution
- Distributed by: Vision Distribution
- Release dates: 17 February 2023 (Berlinale); 23 February 2023 (Italy)
- Running time: 128 minutes
- Country: Italy
- Language: Italian

Massimo Troisi: Somebody Down There Likes Me (Italian: Laggiù qualcuno mi ama) is a 2023 Italian documentary film co-written and directed by Mario Martone. The documentary film is a Mario Martone's personal journey in Massimo Troisi's cinema. By assembling the scenes of his films, Martone wants to highlight Troisi as a great director of our cinema even before being a great comic actor. It was selected at the 73rd Berlin International Film Festival in Berlinale Special, where it had its world premiere on 17 February 2023. It was released in cinemas on 23 February 2023.

== Content of the film ==
Massimo Troisi lived through 1953 to 1994. His last film was the 1994 comedy drama Il Postino: The Postman. He was a stage actor and film director and his understanding of comedy, keen observations of the intimate and political relationships between men and women is a source of inspiration for an entire generation. The film is a Mario Martone's personal journey in his cinema. He collected the scenes of his films, and highlighted Troisi as a great director.

== Cast ==
- Francesco Piccolo
- Anna Pavignano
- Valeria Pezza
- Goffredo Fofi
- Paolo Sorrentino
- Salvo Ficarra
- Valentino Picone
- Michael Radford
- Roberto Perpignani
- Federico Chiacchiari
- Demetrio Salvi
- Sentieri Selvaggi

== Release ==
Massimo Troisi: Somebody Down There Likes Me had its premiere on 17 February 2023 as part of the 73rd Berlin International Film Festival, in Berlinale Special. It was released in cinemas on 23 February 2023.

== Reception ==
Vittoria Scarpa reviewing for Cineuropa praised the film and wrote, "this sincere tale that Martone dedicates to a beloved and regretted fellow citizen, a tender homage "from director to director" that for two hours takes the spectator back in time, to an unrepeatable creative period." Andrew Murray in his review in The Upcoming rated the film with 3 stars out of 5 and wrote, "[T]his picture is an endearing celebration and testament to the man from those who knew him best."
