= Toto, Peppino and the Fanatics =

1958 film

Toto, Peppino and the Fanatics (Totò, Peppino e le fanatiche)
- Film poster
- Directed by: Mario Mattoli
- Written by: Agenore Incrocci; Ruggero Maccari; Furio Scarpelli; Stefano Vanzina; Mario Mattoli
- Produced by: Isidoro Broggi; Renato Libassi
- Starring: Totò; Peppino De Filippo; Johnny Dorelli
- Cinematography: Anchise Brizzi
- Edited by: Gisa Radicchi Levi
- Music by: Johnny Dorelli; Renato Carosone
- Distributed by: Titanus
- Release date: 1958
- Running time: 90 minutes
- Country: Italy
- Language: Italian

Toto, Peppino and the Fanatics (Italian: Totò, Peppino e le fanatiche) is a 1958 Italian comedy film directed by Mario Mattoli and starring Totò.

== Plot ==
The poor Antonio Vignanelli and Peppino Caprioli are exacerbated by hobby and foibles of their respective families, the two that cause many problems. The two are taken for fools and taken to the asylum, and in fact the director of the asylum (Aroldo Tieri) tells how the various misunderstandings that led to their hospitalization are due in reality the foibles of their families.

== Cast ==
- Totò as Antonio Vignanelli
- Peppino De Filippo as Peppino Caprioli
- Johnny Dorelli as Carlo Caprioli
- Alessandra Panaro as la figlia dei Vignanelli
- Diana Dei as la moglie del capoufficio
- Mario Riva as Peppino's boss
- Rosalia Maggio as Anita Vignanelli
- Aroldo Tieri as il direttore del manicomio
- Enzo Garinei as il giornalista
- Giacomo Furia as il cugino di Giovanni
- Peppino De Martino as Giovanni
- Yvette Masson as Trude, the German tourist
- Fanfulla as Giacinti
- Renato Carosone as himself
- Anna Campori
- Edda Ferronao
