= Johnny Dorelli =

Italian singer, actor and television presenter

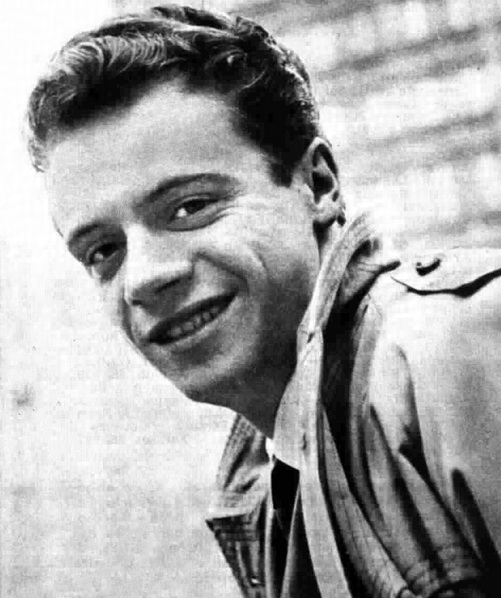
- Dorelli in 1958

Background information
- Born: Giorgio Guidi; 20 February 1937 (age 89); Meda, Lombardy, Italy
- Genres: Easy listening; Jazz; Swing; Pop music
- Occupations: Singer; Actor; Television presenter
- Labels: CGD; Carosello
- Spouses: Catherine Spaak (m. 1972; div. 1979); Gloria Guida (m. 1991)

Giorgio Guidi (born 20 February 1937), known professionally as Johnny Dorelli, is an Italian singer, actor and television presenter. He rose to prominence in Italian popular music during the 1950s and 1960s, particularly through his performances at the Sanremo Music Festival, where he won in 1958 and 1959 alongside Domenico Modugno. He subsequently developed a career in cinema, television, radio and musical theatre.

== Early life ==
Giorgio Guidi was born in Meda, Lombardy, Italy, on 20 February 1937. In 1946, he moved with his family to New York City, where his father, Aurelio Guidi, worked as an opera singer under the stage name Nino D'Aurelio. He studied piano and double bass at the High School of Music & Art in New York. His stage name, Johnny Dorelli, was inspired by the English pronunciation of his father's stage name.

Dorelli began his entertainment career in the United States, where he attracted the attention of bandleader Percy Faith. He appeared on American television programmes before returning to Italy in the mid-1950s. He subsequently signed with the Italian record label CGD.

== Career ==
=== Music ===
Dorelli's early recordings consisted largely of Italian interpretations of American popular standards. His repertoire included songs such as "Lover", "What Is This Thing Called Love?" and "Love Me or Leave Me". His singing style was influenced by jazz, swing and the American crooner tradition.

His first major success came with "Calypso Melody" in 1957. In 1958, he participated in the Sanremo Music Festival 1958 alongside Domenico Modugno. Their performance of "Nel blu, dipinto di blu", internationally known as "Volare", won the competition. The duo returned to the festival in 1959 and won again with "Piove (Ciao, ciao bambina)".

Dorelli continued to participate in the Sanremo Festival during the 1960s. Among his best-known recordings were "Julia", "Boccuccia di rosa", "Love in Portofino", "Lettera a Pinocchio" and "Monte Carlo". In 1962, he appeared on The Ed Sullivan Show, where he performed "Love in Portofino" and appeared alongside Connie Francis and Johnny Hallyday.

In 1967, he performed "L'immensità" at the Sanremo Festival, finishing ninth. Other songs associated with his career include "Speedy Gonzales", "Era settembre", "Probabilmente", "Al buio sto sognando", "Solo più che mai", "Arriva la bomba" and "E penso a te".

In 1969, he competed at Sanremo alongside Caterina Caselli. He later returned to the festival as a presenter in 1990. In 2007, he participated again as a singer with "Meglio così", written by Gianni Ferrio and Giorgio Calabrese and accompanied by pianist Stefano Bollani.

Dorelli also recorded jazz and swing material. His later albums included Swingin' (2004) and Swingin' - Parte seconda (2007).

=== Television and radio ===
Alongside his musical career, Dorelli became a familiar figure on Italian television. During the 1960s, he appeared in entertainment programmes including Il Musichiere and Canzonissima, and hosted programmes such as Johnny 7 and Johnny sera.

He also worked in radio, including the variety programme Gran Varietà. His television career continued through the following decades, with appearances and presenting roles in programmes such as Premiatissima and Fantastico.

Dorelli also acted in television productions, including the adaptation of Edmondo De Amicis's novel Cuore and the television adaptation of Italo Svevo's Zeno's Conscience.

=== Film ===
Dorelli began appearing in films during the 1950s. His early film appearances included Cantando sotto le stelle (1956) and Toto, Peppino and the Fanatics (1958).

In 1967, he starred in How to Kill 400 Duponts, directed by Steno. The comedy parodied the popular Italian comic-book character Diabolik and featured Dorelli in the leading role.

During the 1970s, he appeared in several Italian comedies and dramas, including Bread and Chocolate (1973), directed by Franco Brusati, Dimmi che fai tutto per me (1976), Il mostro (1977), directed by Luigi Zampa, and Come perdere una moglie e trovare un'amante (1978).

His subsequent film appearances included Mi faccio la barca (1980), Odd Squad (1982), State buoni... se potete (1983), Occhio, malocchio, prezzemolo e finocchio (1983). His later film appearance was in But When Do the Girls Get Here? (2005), directed by Pupi Avati.

=== Theatre ===
Dorelli also developed a successful career in musical theatre. One of his best-known stage roles was in Aggiungi un posto a tavola, a musical comedy written by Pietro Garinei and Sandro Giovannini, with music by Armando Trovajoli. He starred in the original production, which premiered in 1974.

The musical was subsequently adapted into English under the title Beyond the Rainbow and performed at the Adelphi Theatre in London's West End in 1978. Dorelli also appeared in other theatrical productions, including Accendiamo la lampada.

== Personal life ==
Dorelli had a long relationship with actress Lauretta Masiero, with whom he had a son, Gianluca Guidi, who later became an actor and singer. In 1972, he married actress Catherine Spaak. They had a son, Gabriele, and divorced in 1979. In 1991, he married actress Gloria Guida, with whom he has a daughter, Guendalina.

== Discography ==
=== Albums ===
- 1955 – Songo americano
- 1958 – Cordialmente
- 1958 – È arrivato da Sanremo
- 1958 – Dance with
- 1959 – We Like Johnny
- 1959 – Sanremo 1959
- 1964 – 30 anni di canzoni d'amore
- 1965 – Viaggio Sentimentale
- 1965 – Johnny Dorelli
- 1967 – L'immensità
- 1970 – Promesse Promesse (with Catherine Spaak)
- 1973 – Le canzoni che piacciono a lei
- 1975 – Aggiungi un posto a tavola
- 1975 – Toi et Moi (with Catherine Spaak)
- 1978 – Giorgio
- 1980 – Accendiamo la lampada
- 1989 – Mi son svegliato e c'eri tu
- 2004 – Swingin'
- 2007 – Swingin' - Parte seconda

== Filmography ==
Year	Title	Director
1956	Cantando sotto le stelle	Marino Girolami
1958	Toto, Peppino and the Fanatics	Mario Mattoli
1967	How to Kill 400 Duponts	Steno
1973	Bread and Chocolate	Franco Brusati
1976	Dimmi che fai tutto per me	Pasquale Festa Campanile
1977	Il mostro	Luigi Zampa
1978	Come perdere una moglie e trovare un'amante	Pasquale Festa Campanile
1980	Mi faccio la barca	Sergio Corbucci
1982	Odd Squad	Enzo Barboni
1983	State buoni... se potete	Luigi Magni
1983	Occhio, malocchio, prezzemolo e finocchio	Sergio Martino
2005	But When Do the Girls Get Here?	Pupi Avati
