= Harem Suare =

1999 film

- Film poster
- Directed by: Ferzan Özpetek
- Written by: Ferzan Özpetek; Gianni Romoli
- Produced by: Abdullah Baykal
- Starring: Marie Gillain; Alex Descas
- Cinematography: Pasquale Mari
- Edited by: Mauro Bonanni
- Music by: Pivio and Aldo De Scalzi
- Distributed by: Medusa Film
- Release date: 21 May 1999
- Running time: 125 minutes
- Countries: Turkey; Italy; France
- Languages: Turkish; Italian; French
- Budget: $4.1 million
- Box office: $780,000

Harem Suare is a 1999 Turkish drama film directed by Ferzan Özpetek. It was screened in the Un Certain Regard section at the 1999 Cannes Film Festival.

== Plot ==
The old Safiye is telling a young woman the life that she lived during the early 1900s. The beautiful young Safiye is the favorite of the sultan, a man tormented by the crisis of the monarchy and the displacement of the Ottoman Empire in Turkey. Safiye is the most beautiful girl in the Sultan's harem, but she is in love with the young Nadir, a eunuch of the personal guard of the sultan. The two young lovers together plan a future, but the war breaks out, and the girl is forced to escape from her country. After arriving in Italy, Safiye is forced to trade on her beauty, performing on stage in theatre.

== Cast ==
- Marie Gillain as Safiye
- Alex Descas as Nadir
- Lucia Bosé as Old Safiye
- Valeria Golino as Anita
- Malick Bowens as Midhat
- Christophe Aquillon as Sumbul
- Serra Yılmaz as Gulfidan
- Haluk Bilginer as Abdulhamit
- Pelin Batu as Cerkez Cariye
- Nilufer Acikalin as Selma (as Nilüfer Açikalin)
- Ayla Algan as Valide
- Meriç Benlioğlu
- Cansel Elcin as Journaliste
- Başak Köklükaya as Gulbahar
- Gaia Narcisi as Aliye
- Selda Özer as Guya

== Bibliography ==
- Harem Suare - "Synopsis", Festival-Cannes, Access date: 14 June 2022
- Harem Suare - "Un affresco complesso e inusuale, imperniato sul crollo dell'Impero Ottomano", Marco Chiani (in Italian), Access date: 14 June 2022
