= No Skin =

- Directed by: Alessandro D'Alatri
- Starring: Anna Galiena; Massimo Ghini; Kim Rossi Stuart
- Cinematography: Claudio Collepiccolo
- Music by: Moni Ovadia; Alfredo La Cosegliaz
- Release date: 1994
- Country: Italy
- Language: Italian

No Skin (Italian: Senza pelle) is a 1994 Italian drama film written and directed by Alessandro D'Alatri. It entered the Quinzaine des Réalisateurs section at the 47th Cannes Film Festival. For this film D'Alatri won the David di Donatello, the Nastro d'Argento and the Ciak d'oro for best screenplay.

== Cast ==
- Kim Rossi Stuart as Saverio
- Anna Galiena as Gina
- Massimo Ghini as Riccardo
- Leila Durante as madre di Gina
- Maria Grazia Grassini as madre di Saverio
- Marina Tagliaferri as Paola
- Paola Tiziana Cruciani as Rossana
- Luca Zingaretti
