= But When Do the Girls Get Here? =

But When do the Girls Get Here?
- Directed by: Pupi Avati
- Starring: Claudio Santamaria; Vittoria Puccini; Paolo Briguglia; Johnny Dorelli
- Cinematography: Pasquale Rachini
- Edited by: Amedeo Salfa
- Music by: Riz Ortolani
- Release date: 2005
- Country: Italy

But When do the Girls Get Here? (Italian: Ma quando arrivano le ragazze?) is a 2005 Italian comedy-drama film written and directed by Pupi Avati. The film won the David di Donatello for best score.

== Cast ==
- Claudio Santamaria: Nick
- Vittoria Puccini: Francesca
- Paolo Briguglia: Gianca
- Johnny Dorelli: Gianca's Father
