= Odd Squad (film) =

- Directed by: Enzo Barboni
- Produced by: Giovanni Di Clemente
- Starring: Johnny Dorelli; Giuliano Gemma; Vincent Gardenia
- Cinematography: Romano Albani
- Music by: Franco Micalizzi
- Release date: 1981
- Country: Italy

Odd Squad (Italian: Ciao nemico, also known as The Odd Squad and The Bridge Between) is a 1981 Italian war comedy film directed by Enzo Barboni.

== Plot ==
After the Allied landing in Sicily, between the U.S. Army and the Italian Army there is an ancient Roman bridge that both want to blow up; but both Italian and American sappers do their best to not do it. Together, they think an absurd plan to make the invading American division that the Italians surrendered and the War is ended. After they part ways, forty years later the American Lieutenant (now an older college engineer teacher) watches the bridge and prepares to go to theater, because his old same-rank enemy became a conductor and that evening he's gonna direct Verdi's Nabucco.

During the end credits, there are info about the ten soldiers; everyone went back to their previous favorite talents and made a career on it.

== Cast ==
- Johnny Dorelli - Lt. Federico Tocci
- Giuliano Gemma - Lt. Joe Kirby
- Jackie Basehart - Pvt. Kirk Jones
- Salvatore Borgese - Soldier Salvatore Ficuzza
- Vincenzo Crocitti - Soldier Tazio Meniconi
- Massimo Lopez - Soldier Pasquale Cutolo
- Riccardo Pizzuti - Soldier Dario Tognon
- Vincent Gardenia - General Brigg
- Eros Pagni - Italian Colonel
- Riccardo Garrone - Lt. Rondi
- Ivan Rassimov - Pvt. Russ Baxter
- Carmen Russo - The Girl
- Jacques Herlin - French General

== Reception ==
The film received mixed reviews. Morando Morandini praised the film as "pleasant and full of comical inventions". Flaminio Di Biagi described it as a "quite ramshackle little comedy".

== See also ==
- List of Italian films of 1981
