= What Time Is It? (film) =

- Italian theatrical release poster
- Directed by: Ettore Scola
- Written by: Beatrice Ravaglioli; Ettore Scola; Silvia Scola
- Produced by: Mario Cecchi Gori; Vittorio Cecchi Gori
- Starring: Marcello Mastroianni; Massimo Troisi; Anne Parillaud; Renato Moretti; Lou Castel
- Cinematography: Luciano Tovoli
- Edited by: Raimondo Crociani
- Music by: Armando Trovajoli
- Production companies: Cecchi Gori Group; Studio E.L. Gaumont
- Distributed by: Warner Bros. Italia (Italy); Gaumont Distribution (France)
- Release dates: 22 September 1989 (Italy); 25 April 1990 (France)
- Running time: 97 minutes
- Countries: Italy; France
- Language: Italian
- Box office: $3.4 million (Italy)

What time is it? (Italian: Che ora è?) is a 1989 Italian drama film directed by Ettore Scola. It was co-produced with France.

== Plot ==
Michele is a young Neapolitan man, a graduate in Humanities, who is about to finish his military service in Civitavecchia. In this Lazio town, Michele has built a small world of relationships and bonds that have embraced his somewhat reserved and withdrawn existential tendencies, as Michele is not inclined towards the search for personal affirmation, visibility, or success.

Michele's father, a successful Roman lawyer, arrives in Civitavecchia for a brief visit, attempting to reconnect with his son, who has been largely neglected for years.

The father tries, in his own way, to make up for the long years of absence, attempting to win his son's attention and ostentatiously showing off the luxurious gifts he has prepared for him in Rome. However, he turns his gestures into irritation when he realizes that his attention and gifts are nothing but a source of embarrassment for the young soldier. It is, however, an old silver watch that Michele seems to truly appreciate, a watch that belonged to his grandfather (a railway worker), and which reminds him of moments of family warmth and simple gestures he experienced in his childhood.

During the long hours of their encounter, father and son, conditioned by mutual misunderstandings, often argue, only to come closer again. The affectionate and paternal attempts of the lawyer to get to know his son and do things for him become truly invasive and pathetic when they visit Loredana's house, a local girl with whom Michele has an uncertain and weak romantic connection, but who is instead subjected to an intense interrogation by the father.

The tensions between the two reach their peak when the father finally realizes, with anger, that his expectations for an unknown son are far from the reality of the young man, who, albeit slowly and uncertainly, is heading in completely opposite directions. The anger soon turns into jealousy toward his wife, and the father confides in Michele about an affair he had with another woman. The young man is deeply shocked and leaves him at the train station, where the father is waiting for the train to Rome.

The elderly lawyer is alone when he is once again reached by Michele on the train. The two finally dissolve the difficulties of their encounter and, feeling at peace, surrender to a childish game in which Michele, imitating the gestures of his paternal grandfather, takes out the silver watch from his jacket and proudly and stiffly answers the question: What time is it?

== Cast ==
- Marcello Mastroianni - Marcello, The Father
- Massimo Troisi - Michele, the son
- Anne Parillaud (dubbed by Valeria Perilli) - Loredana
- Renato Moretti (dubbed by Fiorenzo Fiorentini) - Sor Pietro
- Lou Castel - Fisherman

== Awards ==
- 4 Venice Film Festival awards: Including Best Actor to both Marcello Mastroianni and Massimo Troisi.
