= Scusate il ritardo =

- Directed by: Massimo Troisi
- Written by: Massimo Troisi; Anna Pavignano
- Starring: Massimo Troisi
- Cinematography: Romano Albani
- Edited by: Antonio Siciliano
- Music by: Antonio Sinagra
- Release date: 1983
- Running time: 112 min
- Country: Italy
- Language: Italian

Scusate il ritardo (Sorry for the delay) is a 1983 Italian comedy film written, directed and starred by Massimo Troisi.

For this film Lina Polito was awarded with a David di Donatello for Best Supporting Actress and Lello Arena was awarded with a David di Donatello for Best Supporting Actor.

== Cast ==
- Massimo Troisi: Vincenzo
- Giuliana De Sio: Anna
- Lello Arena: Tonino
- Lina Polito: Patrizia, Vincenzo's sister
- Franco Acampora: Alfredo, Vincenzo's brother

== See also ==
- List of Italian films of 1983
