= Umberto Carteni =

Italian film director

- Born: 3 August 1970 (age 56); Rome, Italy
- Occupations: Film director, screenwriter

Umberto Carteni (born 3 August 1970) is an Italian film director and screenwriter.

== Filmography ==
=== Film ===
- Different from Whom? (2009)
- Studio illegale (2013)
- Divorzio a Las Vegas (2020)
- Quasi orfano (2022)
- La seconda chance (2023)
- Dicono di te (2024)
- The Love Scam (2025)
- Classmates (2026)

=== Television series ===
- L'isola di Pietro (2017)
