= Louis Siciliano =

Italian composer

Louis Siciliano (born in Naples, Italy - 19 March 1975) is a Soundtrack, Jazz and World-Music composer, piano and synth performer, sound engineer and music producer.

== Career ==
Siciliano produced, composed, orchestrated, conducted and mixed soundtracks for feature film productions, TV commercials, TV movies, theatre shows, musicals and opera. His music production as a recording artist encompasses styles including modern jazz, electronic music, contemporary symphonic music, opera, post rock, traditional Latin music, Celtic and classical Indian music.

On 12 May 2013, he started a new artistic life with the name ::ALUEI::.

== Awards ==
- Nastro d'Argento 2006 for Best Score The Fever, awarded to the composers pool (Negramaro, Roy Paci, Fabio Barovero, Simone Fabbroni, Louis Siciliano)
- Award for "Best original score" at "Tropea Film Festival" 2008
- Award "Federazione italiana dei cinema d'essai" (FICE) Mantova, 2010
- Award as Composer of the Year during "Close encounters between music and cinema" at Cinecittà Space, Venice, 2010 (collateral award during the 67th Venice International Film Festival)
- "Fontana d'argento 2012" for the cultural commitment on social life
- "Campania Award 2019" for the international activity as music composer and producer

== Selected filmography ==
- The Fever (La febbre) (2005)
- Il rabdomante (2006)
- I, the Other (Io, l'altro) (2007)
- Family Game (2007)
- Principessa (2008)
- I mostri oggi (2009)
- My Land (2009)
- Due vite per caso (2010)
- 5 (Cinque) (2010)
- Happy Family (2010)
- 20 Cigarettes (20 sigarette) (2010)
- African Women (2011)
- Circeo, terra di Oscar (2011)
- Il Mundial dimenticato (2011)
- Ti stimo fratello (2012)
- Gypsy, A Man (2012)
- Io è morto (2013)
- A Napoli non piove mai (2015)
- My Italy (2016)
- Il camionista (2016)
