= Le vie del Signore sono finite =

- Directed by: Massimo Troisi
- Cinematography: Camillo Bazzoni
- Edited by: Nino Baragli
- Music by: Pino Daniele
- Distributed by: Columbia Pictures Italia
- Release date: 23 December 1987
- Country: Italy
- Language: Italian

The ways of the Lord are over (Le vie del Signore sono finite) is a 1987 Italian comedy-drama film written and directed by Massimo Troisi. The film won the Nastro d'Argento for best screenplay.

For his performance Marco Messeri won the Ciak d'oro for best supporting actor.

== Plot ==
The story takes place in the fascist era. Camillo, a barber of Acquasalubre, suffers from a psychosomatic illness: he has in fact lost the use of his legs without having any organic lesion and his doctor indicates the cause in the finished love between him and Vittoria, a girl of French origin long time resident in Italy. In the train returning from Lourdes, Camillo knows Orlando, who is really paralytic. The two chat, and Camillo tells him about his doctor, who also acts as a psychoanalyst who is a follower and admirer of a certain Sigmund Freud, who however does not read his letters, because they are trashed by a maid who, mindful of the defeat of Austria in the still recent First World War, he hated Italians. A few days later, Camillo discovers that Vittoria has engaged with another, a Frenchman named Bernard, but she has not interrupted her relationship with Camillo, since they are still meeting. After their meeting, Bernard discovers it and argues with Vittoria, since he can't stand having her meet again after leaving. To the joy of their possible rapprochement, Camillo heals and returns to walk, but decides to keep quiet about his recovery so as not to displease Orlando and ruin his friendship, revealing him only to Vittoria and his brother Leone, also a barber and he too is in pain, which, as he will finally admit, exists only to care for his sick brother.

To try to get Orlando out of his profound state of solitude, Camillo organizes with Vittoria a meeting in which he pretends to meet the girl casually, accompanied by his friend Anita who, according to Camillo, would approach Orlando's tastes, in order to favor a possible relationship. However, Anita declares herself a fervent admirer of the Duce and leaves the tearoom in disgust after a joke from Camillo about Mussolini. Orlando, moreover, instead of d'Anita, falls in love with Vittoria and reveals it to his friend. A few days later, seeing him by chance coming out of the tub alone, Orlando discovers Camillo's recovery.

The next day, Camillo goes to Rome to patent two lotions of his invention, one against baldness and one against pain, but the fascist hierarch who presides over the patent office Cosimo Cinieri haranks him, almost with contempt, saying that according to the Duce (who was bald!) the way of salvation is "marked by pain and suffering". So Camillo returns disappointed and bitter to the country. On his return he will be arrested because of the joke addressed to Anita, who has been a spy and sent a punitive expedition. He will remain in prison for two years, where he will fall ill again. It will come out thanks to Orlando, meanwhile become an important party official. Orlando assures him that there has never been anything beyond friendship between him and Vittoria, and that he is also preparing to go on a trip to Ethiopia. On his return home, he will find a letter from Vittoria containing a photograph in which the girl is wearing a straw hat, which Camillo recognizes as he previously donated to Orlando and is convinced, also by a malicious insinuation by Leone, that Orlando and Vittoria live together in Paris. Once in the transalpine capital, after having found it, he discovers that his were just jealousies (Orlando in turn gave the straw hat to Vittoria before the final leave) and the two can finally return together.

== Cast ==
- Massimo Troisi: Camillo
- Marco Messeri: Leone
- Jo Champa: Vittoria
- Massimo Bonetti: Orlando
- Enzo Cannavale: father of Camillo
- Clelia Rondinella: sister of Camillo
