= The Fever (2005 film) =

- Directed by: Alessandro D'Alatri
- Music by: Louis Siciliano, Negramaro, Fabio Barovero, Roy Paci, Simone Fabroni
- Release date: 2005
- Language: Italian

The Fever (Italian: La febbre) is a 2005 Italian comedy-drama film directed by Alessandro D'Alatri.

== Cast ==
- Fabio Volo as Mario
- Valeria Solarino as Linda
- Cochi Ponzoni as Mario
- Arnoldo Foà as the President
- Gisella Burinato as Maddalena
- Lucilla Agosti as Marina
- Julie Depardieu as Julie
- Alessandro Garbin as Giovanni
- Paolo Jannacci as Mario's Friend
- Massimo Bagliani as Cerqueti
- Vittorio Franceschi as Faoni
- Thomas Trabacchi as Bicio
- Stefano Chiodaroli as Michele
