= Massimo Troisi =

Italian actor, film director, and poet (1953–1994)

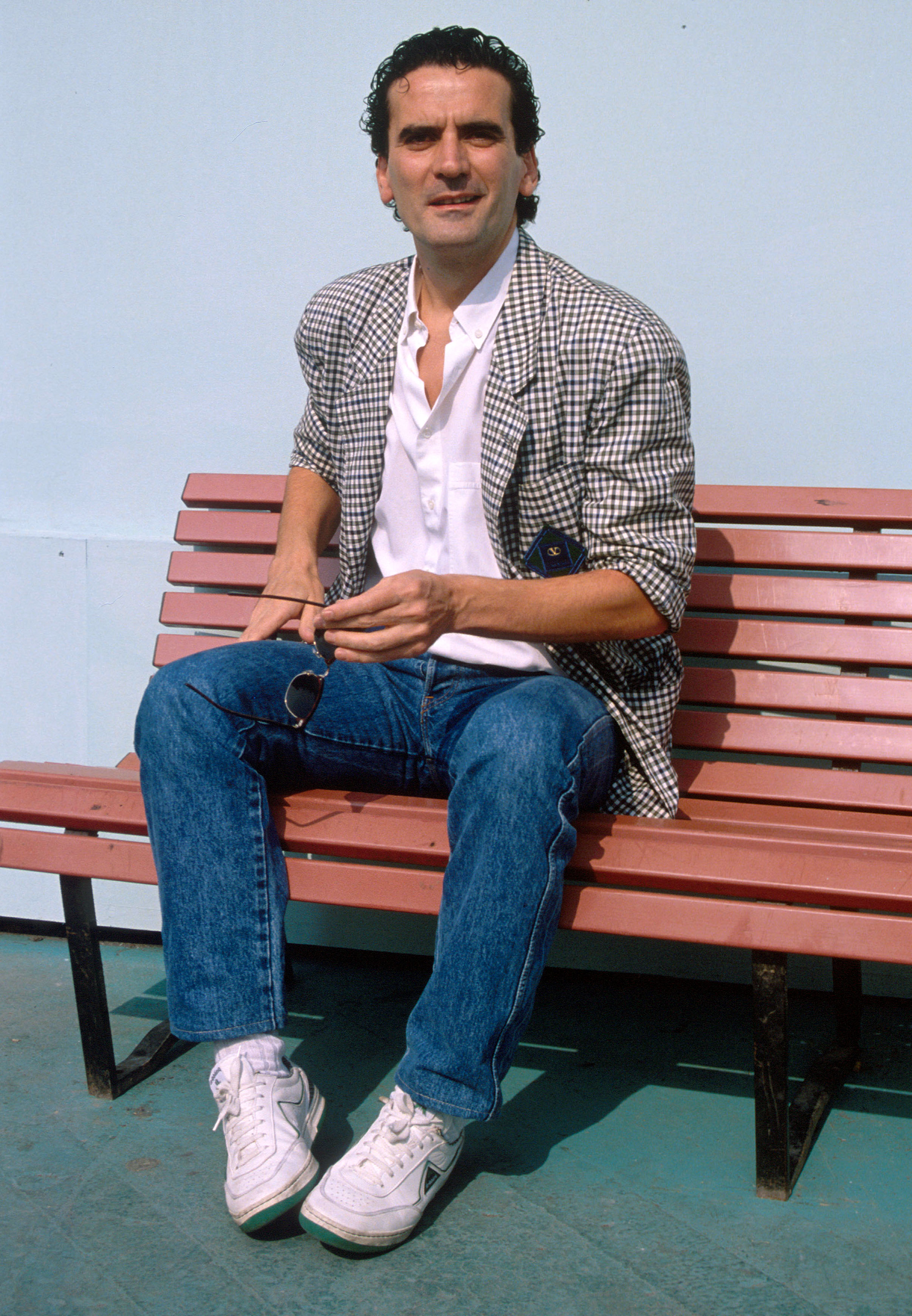
- Troisi in 1989
- Born: 19 February 1953; San Giorgio a Cremano, Italy
- Died: 4 June 1994 (aged 41); Rome, Italy
- Occupations: Actor; screenwriter; film director
- Years active: 1968–1994
- Height: 1.78 m (5 ft 10 in)

Massimo Troisi (Italian pronunciation: [ˈmassimo troˈiːzi]; 19 February 1953 – 4 June 1994) was an Italian actor, cabaret performer, comedian, screenwriter and film director. He is best known for his works in the films I'm Starting back from Three (1981) and Il Postino: The Postman (1994), for which he was posthumously nominated for two Oscars. He won the Volpi Cup for Best Actor for his performance in the film What Time Is It? (1989). Nicknamed "the comedian of feelings", he is considered one of the most important actors of Italian theater and cinema.

== Early years and TV star ==
Troisi was born into a large family in San Giorgio a Cremano, a town near Naples. His father Alfredo was a train engineer. Some of his family experiences were later told in his first films. After secondary school, Troisi wrote some poems inspired by his favourite author, Pier Paolo Pasolini, winning a youth poetry prize in his name, while also imitating him in sketches. In 1969 he started to play in a small local theatre together with some childhood friends (including Lello Arena and Enzo Decaro).

Trois's increasingly serious heart problems began in his teenage years, after he suffered from a bout of rheumatic fever. In 1976 he had to visit the United States for a heart valve operation, the expenses for which were paid with the help of his friends.

Troisi started his artistic career as a cabaret showman in 1972, as a member of the comic trio called "I Saraceni" ("The Saracens") and, later, "La Smorfia" (from the name of the "book of numbers" traditionally used in Naples for lottery and tombola, but also meaning "The Grimace"). His mates were De Caro and Arena. They gained national fame on the radio and increased it consistently from 1977 onwards eventually becoming TV stars with the shows Non Stop, La sberla (1978) and Luna Park (1979). Troisi soon gained the status of leader of the trio. He was noted for his use of facial mimicry and of apparently confused speech—in these he drew inspiration from such famous figures of Neapolitan comedy as Totò, and Eduardo and Peppino De Filippo.

== Cinema ==
Troisi wrote, directed, and starred in his first film, Ricomincio da tre ("I Start Over from Three") in 1981. He achieved wide success and critical praise, establishing himself as one of the most talented new Italian directors of the 1980s. Like his second film, Ricomincio da tre is centered on the troublesome love life of a Neapolitan character, partly inspired by Troisi's youth, as well as featuring Lello Arena. Scusate il ritardo, similar to the preceding one, was released in 1983, and had Giuliana De Sio as co-star.

Troisi starred opposite Roberto Benigni in Non ci resta che piangere (1984), in which they play two friends who are accidentally transported back in time to the 15th century; there they meet Leonardo da Vinci and, upon realising which age they are in, travel to Spain to try to stop Christopher Columbus from discovering the Americas.

After some small acting roles, in 1987 Troisi directed Le vie del Signore sono finite, set during the Fascist era. The film won a Silver Ribbon for best screenplay. In the following years, he starred alongside Marcello Mastroianni, in Ettore Scola's Splendor (1989), Che ora è? (1989, who earned him and Mastroianni the Volpi Cup for Best Actor) and Il viaggio di Capitan Fracassa (1990). His last film as director (also as screenwriter and actor) was Pensavo fosse amore, invece era un calesse (1991), again centering on the everyday difficulties of love between a man and a woman (portrayed by Francesca Neri).

== Il Postino and death ==
Troisi came to international fame through the success of Il Postino: The Postman, directed by Michael Radford. While working with an increasingly weakened heart from his teenage bout with rheumatic fever, Troisi died in 1994 of a heart attack in his sister's house at Infernetto, Rome, 12 hours after the camera stopped rolling and main filming on Il Postino had finished. It was reported that he postponed surgery to complete the film. Troisi was just 41.

Years before he had scheduled a heart transplant but did not proceed with it, telling Radford: "You know, I don’t really want this new heart. You know why. Because the heart is the centre of emotion, and an actor is a man of emotion. Who knows what kind of an actor I’m going to be with someone else’s heart inside of me."

Troisi was posthumously nominated for Academy Awards for Best Actor and Best Writing for Il Postino, and was the sixth person to be posthumously nominated for an acting Academy Award. Earlier posthumous nominations were Jeanne Eagels, James Dean (twice), Spencer Tracy, Peter Finch (won) and Ralph Richardson. In 1996 he was also nominated for a BAFTA in the Best Actor in a Leading Role category. The film won Best Direction and Best Original Music categories

Pino Daniele worked on the soundtracks of most of his films. Eduardo De Filippo, the most prominent Italian dramatist of the 20th century with Luigi Pirandello, said he was "a comedian of the future, rooted in the past".

== Filmography ==
=== Director ===
- Ricomincio da tre (1981)
- Morto Troisi, viva Troisi! (1982, TV special)
- Scusate il ritardo (1983)
- Non ci resta che piangere (1984, with Roberto Benigni)
- Le vie del Signore sono finite (1987)
- Pensavo fosse amore, invece era un calesse (1991)

=== Screenwriter ===
- Ricomincio da tre (1981)
- Morto Troisi, viva Troisi! (1982)
- No grazie, il caffè mi rende nervoso (1982)
- Scusate il ritardo (1983)
- Non ci resta che piangere (1984)
- Le vie del Signore sono finite (1987)
- Pensavo fosse amore, invece era un calesse (1991)
- Il Postino: The Postman (1994)

=== Actor ===
- Ricomincio da tre (1981) – Gaetano
- Morto Troisi, viva Troisi! (1982, TV Movie) – La salma / Il tecnico delle luci / Himself
- No grazie, il caffè mi rende nervoso (1982) – Troisi
- Scusate il ritardo (1983) – Vincenzo
- "FF.SS." – Cioè: "...che mi hai portato a fare sopra a Posillipo se non mi vuoi più bene?" (1983)
- Non ci resta che piangere (1984) – Mario
- Hotel Colonial (1986) – Werner
- Le vie del Signore sono finite (1987) – Camillo
- Splendor (1989) – Luigi
- Che ora è? (1989) – Michele, the son
- Il viaggio di Capitan Fracassa (1990) – Pulcinella
- Pensavo fosse amore, invece era un calesse (1991) – Tommaso
- Il Postino: The Postman (1994) – Mario Ruoppolo (final film role)

== In popular culture ==
In 2023, a documentary film on Troisi, titled as Massimo Troisi: Somebody Down There Likes Me was directed by Mario Martone. The film had its premiere at the 73rd Berlin International Film Festival on 17 February 2023.
