= Casomai =

- Directed by: Alessandro D'Alatri
- Cinematography: Agostino Castiglioni
- Music by: Pivio and Aldo De Scalzi
- Production companies: Magic Moments; Rai Cinema
- Release date: 30 April 2002
- Running time: 114 minute
- Country: Italy
- Language: Italian

Casomai (also known as If by Chance) is a 2002 Italian romantic comedy film written and directed by Alessandro D'Alatri.

== Cast ==
- Fabio Volo: Tommaso
- Stefania Rocca: Stefania
- Gennaro Nunziante: Don Livio
- Mino Manni: Rino
- Maurizio Scattorin: Fausto
- Andrea Jonasson: Christel
- Sara D'Amario: Laura
