= Pensavo fosse amore, invece era un calesse =

1991 Italian romance-comedy drama film

- Directed by: Massimo Troisi
- Cinematography: Camillo Bazzoni
- Music by: Pino Daniele
- Distributed by: Penta
- Release date: 20 December 1991
- Country: Italy
- Language: Italian
- Box office: $6.9 million (Italy)

Pensavo fosse amore, invece era un calesse (I Thought It Was Love, But It Was a Barouche) is a 1991 Italian romance-comedy drama film. It is the last film directed by Massimo Troisi. For his performance, Angelo Orlando won the David di Donatello for Best Supporting Actor.

== Plot ==
Tommaso and Cecilia are young engaged couple in Naples, leading an apparently regular life. He has a restaurant in Borgo Marinari near the area of Castel dell'Ovo. Tommaso's (single) friend Amedeo owns a book shop nearby; Amedeo's teenager sister, Chiara, is in love with Tommaso.

Tommaso and Cecilia are about to get married, but Cecilia's excessive jealousy might ruin everything. During a moment of intimacy, she is convinced she heard her future husband saying another woman's name, Elena. The situation quickly degenerates, so Cecilia leaves Tommaso and starts seeing a mysterious, older man named Enea.

In the meantime, Amedeo becomes involved with Flora, the former girlfriend of another friend of theirs, Giorgio. When Amedeo's sister Chiara realises that she can't win Tommaso's heart, she spikes his coffee with rat poison in a comic scene. She is so jealous that she even sets Enea's motorcycle on fire. Tommaso tries to set things straight even turning to a two-bit spellcaster of white magic for help. It seems to work; Cecilia leaves Enea and goes back to Tommaso.

Their wedding day arrives, but Tommaso does not show up at the church; his love for Cecilia is gone. He sends a message to Cecilia asking her to meet him at a local cafe. He is still wearing his wedding attire and she comes in her wedding dress. He tells her "men and women are not meant to be married", and agreeing she arranges to go out later that night with him.

== Cast ==
- Massimo Troisi: Tommaso
- Francesca Neri: Cecilia
- Marco Messeri: Enea
- Angelo Orlando: Amedeo
- Natalia Bizzi: Flora

== Reception ==
It was the third highest-grossing Italian film in Italy in 1992 with a gross of $6.9 million.
