= Alessandro D'Alatri =

Italian film director (1955–2023)

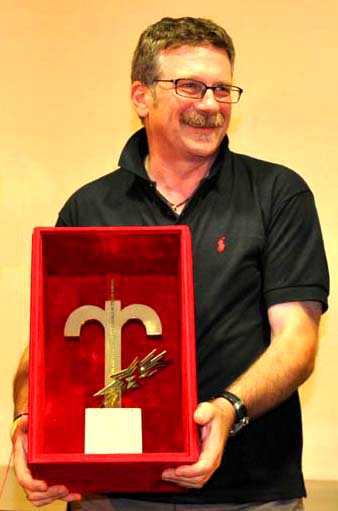
- Born: 24 February 1955; Rome, Italy
- Died: 3 May 2023 (aged 68); Rome, Italy
- Occupations: Director; screenwriter; actor
- Years active: 1969–2023

Alessandro D'Alatri (24 February 1955 – 3 May 2023) was an Italian film and television director, screenwriter and actor. He started a career as an actor, and later switched as a film and television director.

== Life and career ==
Born in Rome, as a teenager D'Alatri was active as a stage and film actor and worked with Luchino Visconti, Giorgio Strehler, and Vittorio De Sica among others. In the 1970s he decided to focus on directing and, after a long apprenticeship as a director of commercials, including an award for best AD director at the 1987 Cannes Lions International Festival of Creativity, in 1991 he directed his first feature film, Red American, for which he won the David di Donatello for Best New Director. His next film, No Skin was both a critical and a commercial success, and received a David di Donatello, a Nastro d'Argento and a Ciak d'oro for best screenplay. His 1998 film The Garden of Eden, an apocryphal history of Jesus, was entered into the main competition at the 59th Venice International Film Festival.

In his later years D'Alatri mainly focused on television, directing some successful TV-series such as The Bastards of Pizzofalcone and Un professore, both starring Alessandro Gassmann. He also directed several music videos for notable artists such as Elisa, Laura Pausini, Renato Zero, and Negramaro. D'Alatri died on 3 May 2023, at the age of 68.

== Filmography ==
=== Film ===
Year	Title	Credited as		Notes
Year	Title	Director	Writer	Notes
1991	Red American	Yes	No	Directing debut
1994	No Skin	Yes		
1996	Il prezzo dell'innocenza	Yes	No	Documentary film
1998	The Garden of Eden	Yes		
2002	Casomai	Yes		
2005	The Fever	Yes		
2006	Commediasexi	Yes		
2010	Sul mare	Yes		
2017	The Startup	Yes		

=== Television ===
Year	Title	Credited as		Notes
Year	Title	Director	Writer	Notes
1996	Ritratti d'autore	Yes	No	Episode: "Sergio Citti"
1998	Alfabeto italiano	Yes		Episode: "Dio in TV"
2017	La legge del numero uno	Yes	No	Television movie
2017	La scuola della notte	Yes	No	Television movie
2018	In punta di piedi	Yes	No	Television movie
2018	The Bastards of Pizzofalcone	Yes	No	6 episodes
2021	Inspector Ricciardi	Yes	No	6 episodes
2021	Un professore	Yes	No	12 episodes

=== Music videos ===
Year	Title	Artist	Notes
2001	"Heaven Out of Hell"	Elisa	
2002	"Non è un film"	Articolo 31	
2005	"Mentre tutto scorre"	Negramaro	
2008	"Invece no"	Laura Pausini	
2009	"Ancora qui"	Renato Zero	
2013	"Vieni con me"	Chiara	
2013	"Alla fine"	Renato Zero	

=== Acting roles ===
Year	Title	Role	Notes
1969	I fratelli Karamazov	Iljusa	Miniseries (4 episodes)
1970	Il ragazzo dagli occhi chiari	Mario	Feature film
1970	The Garden of the Finzi-Continis	Teenage Giorgio	Feature film
