= Pasquale Catalano (composer) =

Italian composer and conductor

- Born: Naples, Italy

Pasquale Catalano (born 14 September 1968) is an Italian composer and conductor.

Catalano was born in Naples, and studied piano and composition. After working in the theater, he entered the Italian film industry. He composed the scores for more than 80 television and cinema productions including Paolo Sorrentino's films One Man Up and The Consequences of Love. His score for the drama film Barney's Version, directed by Richard J. Lewis, earned him the 2010 Genie Award for best original score. Other awards include the Nastri d'Argento and Ciak d'oro.
