= 64th David di Donatello =

2019 Italian film awards

- Date: 27 March 2019
- Site: RAI Studios, Rome, Italy
- Hosted by: Carlo Conti

Highlights
- Best Picture: Dogman
- Most awards: Dogman (9)
- Most nominations: Dogman (16)

Television coverage
- Network: Rai 1

The 64th David di Donatello ceremony, presented by the Accademia del Cinema Italiano, was held on 27 March 2019 to honor the best in Italian cinema in 2018. It was hosted by Carlo Conti.

Accademia del Cinema Italiano introduced new categories: David Youth Award, selecting the best film voted by 3,000 Italian high school students and David Audience Award which honored the year's biggest box office hit. It also incorporated the category Best European Film into Best Foreign Film to encompass all films made out of Italy.

The crime drama film Dogman won the most awards of the night with nine, including Best Film. Other winners include On My Skin with four, Call Me by Your Name, Capri-Revolution and Loro with two, and Frontiera, The Invisible Boy: Second Generation, Roma, Santiago, Italia, There's No Place Like Home, and The Vice of Hope with one.

== Winners and nominees ==
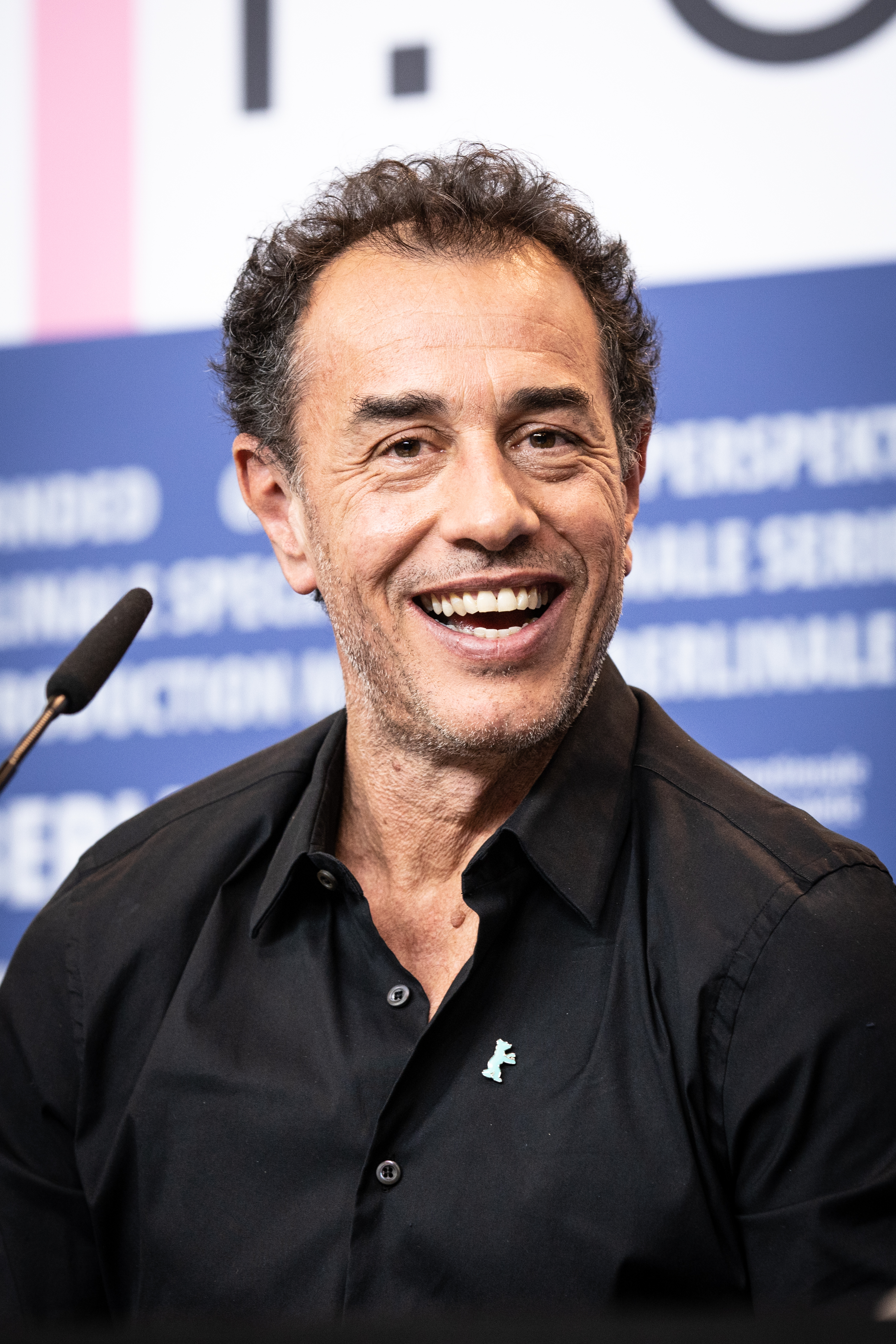
Matteo Garrone, Best Director winner

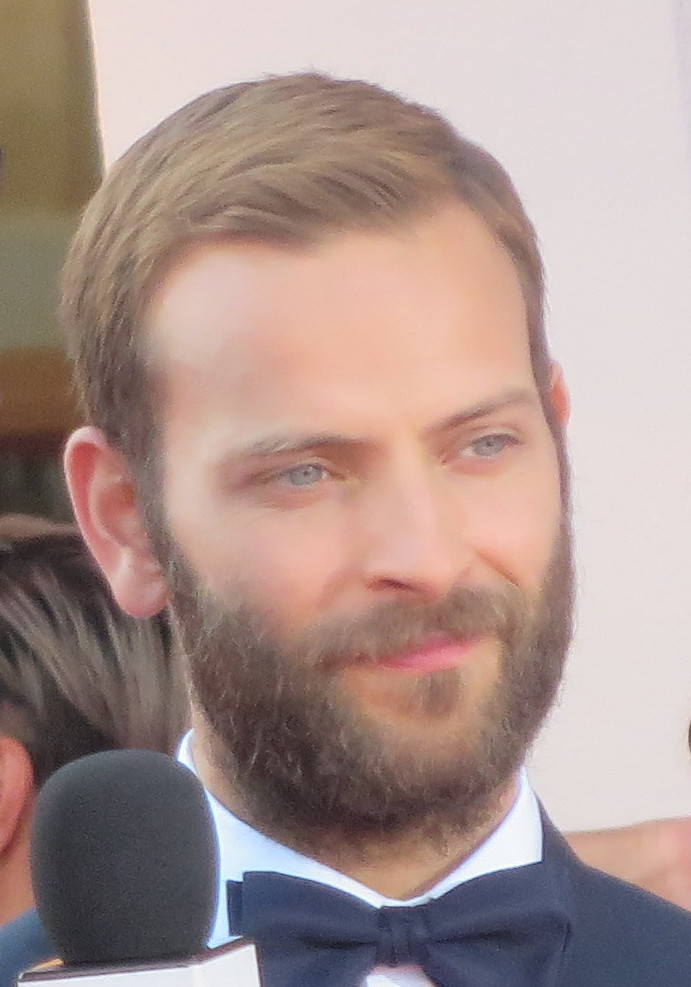
Alessandro Borghi, Best Actor winner

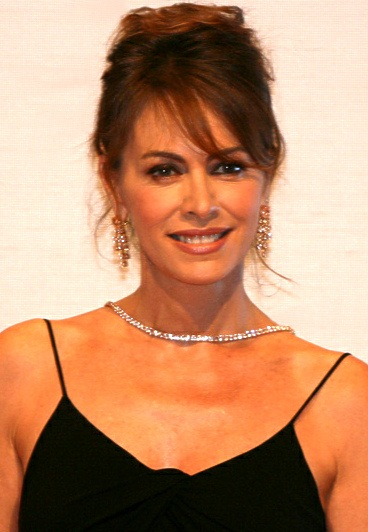
Elena Sofia Ricci, Best Actress winner

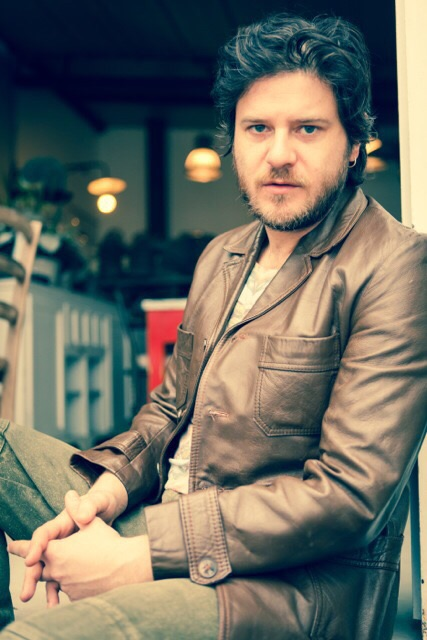
Edoardo Pesce, Best Supporting Actor winner

The nominations were announced on 19 February 2019. Dogman led the nominations with fifteen, followed by Capri-Revolution with thirteen and Call Me by Your Name with twelve.

Winners are listed first, highlighted in boldface, and indicated with a double dagger (‡).

**Best Film**: **Dogman – Matteo Garrone, director**‡; Call Me by Your Name – Luca Guadagnino, director; Euphoria – Valeria Golino, director; Happy as Lazzaro – Alice Rohrwacher, director; On My Skin – Alessio Cremonini, director	**Best Producer**: **On My Skin – Andrea Occhipinti, Luigi Musini, and Olivia Musini, producers; Cinemaundici and Lucky Red, production companies**‡; Boys Cry – Agostino Saccà, Maria Grazia Saccà, and Giuseppe Saccà, producers; Pepito Produzioni and Rai Cinema, production companies; Call Me by Your Name – Peter Spears, Luca Guadagnino, Emilie Georges, Rodrigo Teixeira, Marco Morabito, James Ivory, and Howard Rosenman, producers; Frenesy Film Company, La Cinéfacture, RT Features, M.Y.R.A. Entertainment, and Water's End Productions, production companies; Dogman – Matteo Garrone, Jeremy Thomas, Jean Labadie, and Paolo Del Brocco, producers; Archimede and Le Pacte, production companies; Happy as Lazzaro – Carlo Cresto-Dina, producer; Tempesta, Rai Cinema, Amka Films Productions, Ad Vitam Production, KNM, and Pola Pandora, production companies
**Best Director**: **Matteo Garrone – Dogman**‡; Valeria Golino – Euphoria; Luca Guadagnino – Call Me by Your Name; Mario Martone – Capri-Revolution; Alice Rohrwacher – Happy as Lazzaro	**Best New Director**: **Alessio Cremonini – On My Skin**‡; Damiano and Fabio D'Innocenzo – Boys Cry; Luca Facchini – Fabrizio De André: Principe libero; Valerio Mastandrea – Ride; Simone Spada – Hotel Gagarin
**Best Actor**: **Alessandro Borghi – On My Skin as Stefano Cucchi**‡; Marcello Fonte – Dogman as Marcello; Luca Marinelli – Fabrizio De André: Principe libero as Fabrizio De André; Riccardo Scamarcio – Euphoria as Matteo; Toni Servillo – Loro as Silvio Berlusconi and Ennio Doris	**Best Actress**: **Elena Sofia Ricci – Loro as Veronica Lario**‡; Anna Foglietta – If Life Gives You Lemons as Miriam; Marianna Fontana – Capri-Revolution as Lucia; Alba Rohrwacher – Lucia's Grace as Lucia; Pina Turco – The Vice of Hope as Maria
**Best Supporting Actor**: **Edoardo Pesce – Dogman as Simone**‡; Fabrizio Bentivoglio – Loro as Santino Recchia; Ennio Fantastichini – Fabrizio De André: Principe libero as Giuseppe De André; Massimo Ghini – There's No Place Like Home as Sandro; Valerio Mastandrea – Euphoria as Ettore	**Best Supporting Actress**: **Marina Confalone – The Vice of Hope as Zi' Mari**‡; Nicoletta Braschi – Happy as Lazzaro as Marchesa Alfonsina De Luna; Donatella Finocchiaro – Capri-Revolution as Maria; Kasia Smutniak – Loro as Kira; Jasmine Trinca – On My Skin as Ilaria Cucchi
**Best Original Screenplay**: **Dogman – Ugo Chiti, Massimo Gaudioso, and Matteo Garrone**‡; Boys Cry – Damiano and Fabio D'Innocenzo; Euphoria – Francesca Marciano, Valia Santella, and Valeria Golino; Happy as Lazzaro – Alice Rohrwacher; On My Skin – Alessio Cremonini and Lisa Nur Sultan	**Best Adapted Screenplay**: **Call Me by Your Name – Luca Guadagnino, Walter Fasano, and James Ivory; based on the novel by André Aciman**‡; I'm Back – Luca Miniero and Nicola Guaglianone; based on the original motion picture screenplay Look Who's Back by Johannes Boss, Minna Fischgartl, and David Wnendt and the novel by Timur Vermes; The Invisible Witness – Stefano Mordini and Massimiliano Catoni; based on the original motion picture screenplay The Invisible Guest written by Oriol Paulo and Lara Sendim; The Leisure Seeker – Paolo Virzì, Francesca Archibugi, Francesco Piccolo, and Stephen Amidon; based on the novel by Michael Zadoorian; La profezia dell'armadillo – Zerocalcare, Oscar Glioti, Valerio Mastandrea, and Johnny Palomba; based on the graphic novel by Zerocalcare
**Best Cinematography**: **Dogman – Nicolaj Brüel**‡; Boys Cry – Paolo Carnera; Call Me by Your Name – Sayombhu Mukdeeprom; Capri-Revolution – Michele D'Attanasio; Happy as Lazzaro – Hélène Louvart	**Best Production Design**: **Dogman – Dimitri Capuani**‡; Call Me by Your Name – Samuel Deshors; Capri-Revolution – Giancarlo Muselli; Happy as Lazzaro – Emita Frigato; Loro – Stefania Cella
**Best Score**: **Capri-Revolution – Apparat and Philipp Thimm**‡; Dogman – Michele Braga; Euphoria – Nicola Tescari; Loro – Lele Marchitelli; On My Skin – Mokadelic; There's No Place Like Home – Nicola Piovani	**Best Original Song**: **"Mystery of Love" from Call Me by Your Name – Music, Lyrics, and Performed by Sufjan Stevens**‡; "'A speranza" from The Vice of Hope – Music, Lyrics, and Performed by Enzo Avitabile; "Araceae" from Capri-Revolution – Music by Apparat and Philipp Thimm; Lyrics by Simon Brambell; Performed by Apparat; "L'invenzione di un poeta" from There's No Place Like Home – Music by Nicola Piovani; Lyrics by Piovani and Aisha Cerami; Performed by Tosca; "'Na gelosia" from Loro – Music by Lele Marchitelli; Lyrics by Pepe Servillo; Performed by Toni Servillo
**Best Editing**: **Dogman – Marco Spoletini**‡; Call Me by Your Name – Walter Fasano; Capri-Revolution – Jacopo Quadri and Natalie Cristiani; Euphoria – Giogiò Franchini; On My Skin – Chiara Vullo	**Best Sound**: **Dogman – Maricetta Lombardo, Alessandro Molaioli, Davide Favargiotti, Mauro Eusepi, Mirko Perri, and Michele Mazzucco**‡; Call Me by Your Name – Yves-Marie Omnes, Thomas Gastinel, Davide Favargiotti, Studio 16 Sound Group, and Jean Pierre Laforce; Capri-Revolution – Alessandro Zanon, Alessandro Palmerini, Alessandro Piazzese, Marta Billingsley, Stefano Grosso, Marzia Cordo, Giancarlo Rutigliano, and Paolo Segat; Happy as Lazzaro – Christophe Giovannoni, Julien D'Esposito, Marta Billingsley, and François Musy; Loro – Emanuele Cecere, Francesco Sabez, Paolo Testa, Silvia Moraes, Alessandro Feletti, Alessandro Quaglio, Mirko Perri, Mauro Eusepi, and Marco Saitta
**Best Costumes**: **Capri-Revolution – Ursula Patzak**‡; Call Me by Your Name – Giulia Piersanti; Dogman – Massimo Cantini Parrini; Happy as Lazzaro – Loredana Buscem; Loro – Carlo Poggioli	**Best Visual Effects**: **The Invisible Boy: Second Generation – Víctor Pérez**‡; Capri-Revolution – Sara Paesani and Rodolfo Migliari; Dogman – Rodolfo Migliari; The Legend of the Christmas Witch – Rodolfo Migliari and Monica Galantucci; Loro – Simone Coco and James Woods; Michelangelo Endless – Giuseppe Squillaci
**Best Make-up Artist**: **Dogman – Dalia Colli and Lorenzo Tamburini**‡; Call Me by Your Name – Fernanda Perez; Capri-Revolution – Alessandro D'Anna; Loro – Maurizio Silvi; On My Skin – Roberto Pastore	**Best Hairstylist**: **Loro – Aldo Signoretti**‡; Call Me by Your Name – Manolo Garcia; Capri-Revolution – Gaetano Panico; Dogman – Daniela Tartari; The King's Musketeers – Massimo Gattabrusi
**Best Documentary**: **Santiago, Italia – Nanni Moretti, director**‡; Friedkin Uncut – Francesco Zippel, director; Goodbye Saigon – Wilma Labate, director; Julian Schnabel: A Private Portrait – Pappi Corsicato, director; Samouni Road – Stefano Savona, director	**Best Short Film**: **Frontiera – Alessandro Di Gregorio, director**‡; Il nostro concerto – Francesco Piras, director; Im Bären – Lilian Sassanelli, director; Magic Alps – Andrea Brusa and Marco Scotuzzi, directors; Yousef – Mohamed Hossameldin, director
**Best Foreign Film**: **Roma – Alfonso Cuarón, director**‡; Bohemian Rhapsody – Bryan Singer, director; Cold War – Paweł Pawlikowski, director; Phantom Thread – Paul Thomas Anderson, director; Three Billboards Outside Ebbing, Missouri – Martin McDonagh, director	**David Youth Award**: **On My Skin – Alessio Cremonini, director**‡; Call Me by Your Name – Luca Guadagnino, director; Dogman – Matteo Garrone, director; Euphoria – Valeria Golino, director; The King's Musketeers – Giovanni Veronesi, director
**Special David Awards**: **Tim Burton** (Cinematic Excellence); **Dario Argento**; **Francesca Lo Schiavo**; **Uma Thurman**	**David Audience Award**: **There's No Place Like Home – Gabriele Muccino, director**

== Films with multiple nominations and awards ==
Films that received multiple nominations
Nominations	Film
16	Dogman
13	Call Me by Your Name
13	Capri-Revolution
12	Loro
10	On My Skin
9	Happy as Lazzaro
8	Euphoria
4	Boys Cry
3	Fabrizio De André: Principe libero
3	There's No Place Like Home
3	The Vice of Hope
2	The King's Musketeers

Films that received multiple awards
Awards	Film
9	Dogman
2	Call Me by Your Name
2	Capri-Revolution
2	Loro
