= Massimo Cantini Parrini =

Italian costume designer (born 1972)

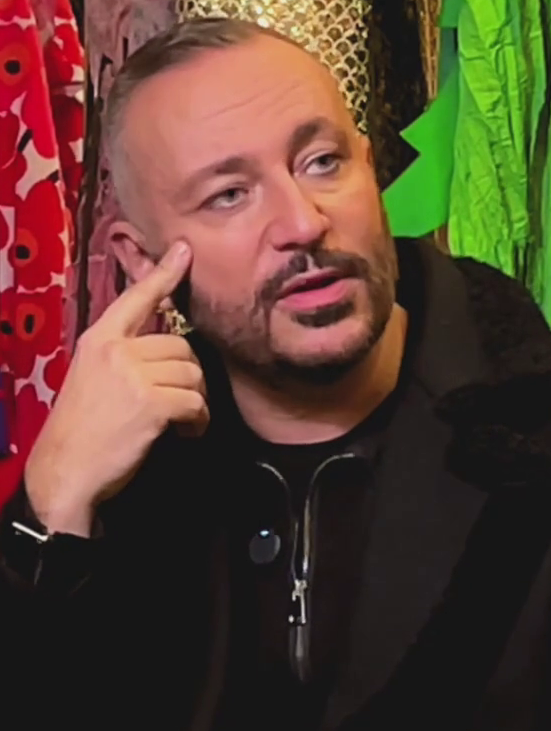
- Born: 13 April 1972 (age 54); Florence, Italy
- Education: University of Florence; Centro Sperimentale di Cinematografia
- Occupation: Costume designer
- Years active: 1996-present

Massimo Cantini Parrini (born 13 April 1972) is an Italian costume designer.

== Life and career ==
Born in Florence, Cantini Parrini graduated in fashion culture and stylism from the University of Florence and in costume designing at the Centro Sperimentale di Cinematografia where he was a pupil of Piero Tosi. He made his professional debut as assistant of Gabriella Pescucci.

During his career he was awarded five David di Donatello, three Nastro d'Argento Awards and a European Film Award for Dogman. He was nominated for Academy Awards for two consecutive years, in 2021 for Matteo Garrone's Pinocchio, and in 2022 together with Jacqueline Durran for their work on Joe Wright's Cyrano.

== Selected filmography ==
- Carnera: The Walking Mountain, directed by Renzo Martinelli (2008)
- Barbarossa, directed by Renzo Martinelli (2009)
- The Woman of My Dreams, directed by Luca Lucini (2010)
- The Wholly Family, directed by Terry Gilliam (short, 2011)
- The Day of the Siege: September Eleven 1683, directed by Renzo Martinelli (2012)
- A Liberal Passion, directed by Marco Ponti (2013)
- How Strange to Be Named Federico, directed by Ettore Scola (2013)
- The State-Mafia Pact, directed by Sabina Guzzanti (2014)
- Tale of Tales, directed by Matteo Garrone (2015)
- Indivisible, directed by Edoardo De Angelis (2016)
- Slam, directed by Andrea Molaioli (2016)
- La verità sta in cielo, directed by Roberto Faenza (2016)
- Black Butterfly, directed by Brian Goodman (2017)
- Riccardo va all'inferno, directed by Roberta Torre (2017)
- The Leisure Seeker, directed by Paolo Virzì (2017)
- Dogman, directed by Matteo Garrone (2018)
- Boys Cry, directed by Damiano and Fabio D'Innocenzo (2018)
- The Invisible Witness, directed by Stefano Mordini (2018)
- The Vice of Hope, directed by Edoardo De Angelis (2018)
- Ordinary Happiness, directed by Daniele Luchetti (2019)
- Pinocchio, directed by Matteo Garrone (2019)
- Bad Tales, directed by Damiano and Fabio D'Innocenzo (2020)
- Miss Marx, directed by Susanna Nicchiarelli (2020)
- The Ties, directed by Daniele Luchetti (2020)
- Romantic Guide to Lost Places, directed by Giorgia Farina (2020)
- The Guest Room, directed by Stefano Lodovichi (2021)
- America Latina, directed by Damiano and Fabio D'Innocenzo (2021)
- Cyrano, directed by Joe Wright (2021)
- L'immensità, directed by Emanuele Crialese (2022)
- Chiara, directed by Susanna Nicchiarelli (2022)
- Ferrari, directed by Michael Mann (2023)
- Comandante, directed by Edoardo De Angelis (2023)
- Maria, directed by Pablo Larraín (2024)
- The Flood, directed by Gianluca Jodice (2024)
- Mussolini: Son of the Century, directed by Joe Wright (2025)
- Three Goodbyes, directed by Isabel Coixet (2025)
- Italianna, directed by Kat Coiro (2026)
