= David di Donatello for Best Cinematography =

Annual Italian film award

The David di Donatello for Best Cinematography (Italian: David di Donatello per il migliore autore della fotografia) is a film award presented annually by the Accademia del Cinema Italiano (ACI, Academy of Italian Cinema) to recognize outstanding efforts on the part of cinematographers who have worked within the Italian film industry during the year preceding the ceremony. The award was first given in 1981.

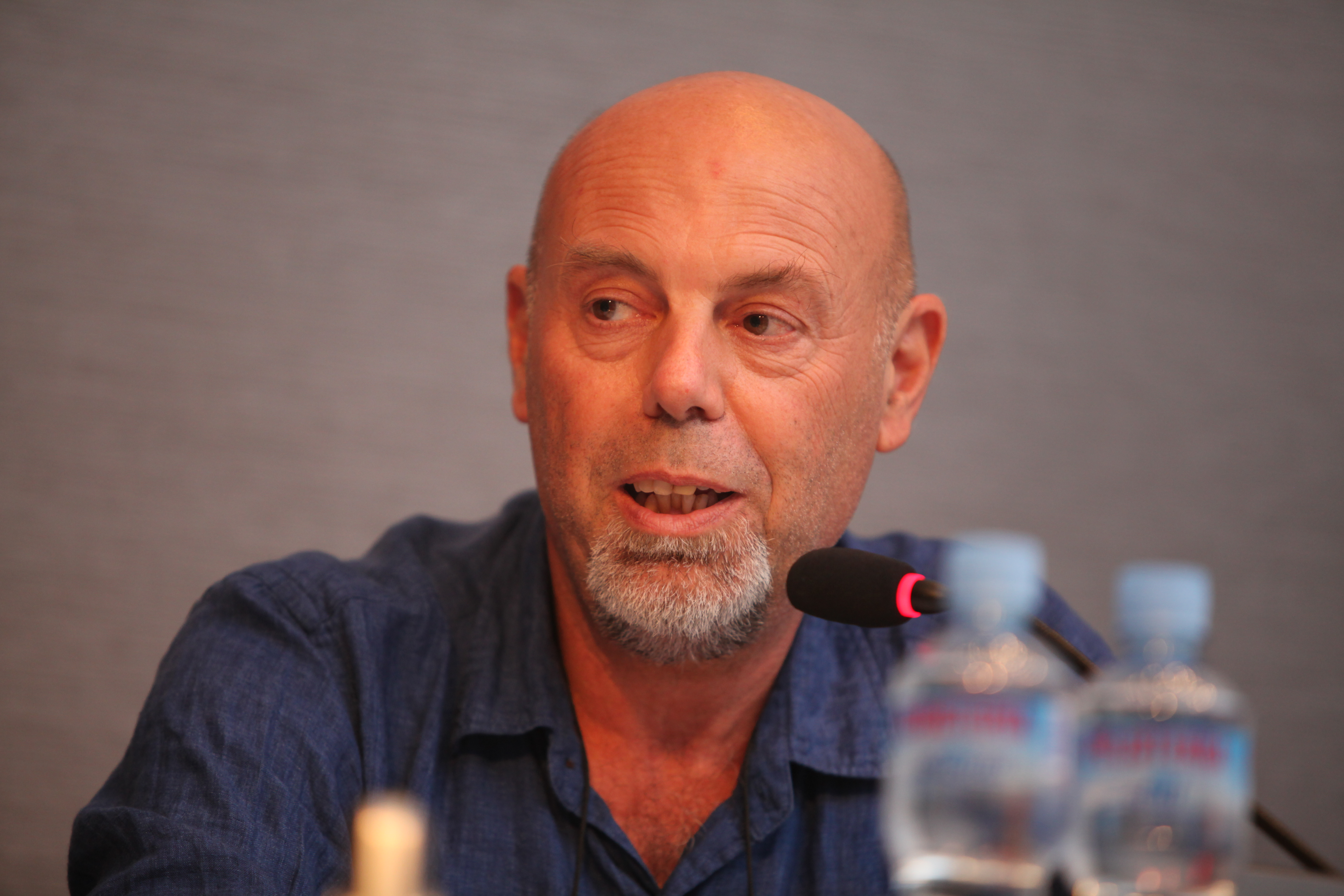
Luca Bigazzi at the Manaki Brothers Film Festival in Bitola, North Macedonia, September 2014

Luca Bigazzi is the record holder with seven awards in the category.

== Winners and nominees ==
Winners are indicated in bold.

=== 1980s ===
1981

- **Pasqualino De Santis** – Three Brothers
- Tonino Delli Colli – Camera d'albergo
- Ennio Guarnieri – The Lady of the Camellias

1982

- **Tonino Delli Colli** – Tales of Ordinary Madness
- Danilo Desideri – Portrait of a Woman, Nude
- Sergio D'Offizi – Il Marchese del Grillo

1983

- **Franco Di Giacomo** – The Night of the Shooting Stars
- Armando Nannuzzi – That Night in Varennes
- Carlo Di Palma – Identification of a Woman

1984

- **Giuseppe Rotunno** – And the Ship Sails On
- Ricardo Aronovich – Le Bal (1983 film)
- Dante Spinotti – Hearts and Armour

1985

- **Pasqualino De Santis** – Carmen
- Giuseppe Lanci – Kaos
- Alfio Contini – A Proper Scandal

1986

- **Giuseppe Lanci** – Camorra
- Tonino Delli Colli and Ennio Guarnieri – Ginger and Fred
- Dante Spinotti – The Berlin Affair

1987

- **Tonino Delli Colli** – The Name of the Rose
- Ricardo Aronovich – The Family
- Franco Di Giacomo – The Inquiry

1988

- **Vittorio Storaro** – The Last Emperor
- Franco Di Giacomo – Dark Eyes
- Tonino Delli Colli – Intervista

1989

- **Dante Spinotti** – The Legend of the Holy Drinker
- Giuseppe Lanci – Francesco
- Luciano Tovoli – Splendor

=== 1990s ===
1990

- **Giuseppe Rotunno** – The Bachelor
- Tonino Nardi – Open Doors
- Tonino Delli Colli – The Voice of the Moon
- Pasqualino De Santis – The Palermo Connection
- Luciano Tovoli – What Time Is It?

1991

- **Luciano Tovoli** – Captain Fracassa's Journey
- Italo Petriccione – Mediterraneo
- Alessio Gelsini Torresi – Ultra
- Giuseppe Lanci – The Sun Also Shines at Night
- Giuseppe Lanci – The Conviction

1992

- **Danilo Desideri** – Damned the Day I Met You
- Tonino Nardi and Renato Tafuri – The Stolen Children
- Ennio Guarnieri – The Inner Circle

1993

- **Alessio Gelsini Torresi** – The Escort
- Luca Bigazzi – Death of a Neapolitan Mathematician
- Giuseppe Lanci – Fiorile

1994

- **Bruno Cascio** – Father and Son
- **Dante Spinotti** – The Secret of the Old Woods
- Luca Bigazzi – A Soul Split in Two
- Giuseppe Lanci – Caro diario

1995

- **Luca Bigazzi** – Lamerica
- Luca Bigazzi – Nasty Love
- Franco Di Giacomo – Il Postino: The Postman

1996

- **Alfio Contini** – Beyond the Clouds
- Darius Khondji – Stealing Beauty
- Dante Spinotti – The Star Maker

1997

- **Tonino Delli Colli** – Marianna Ucrìa
- Pasqualino De Santis and Marco Pontecorvo – The Truce
- Blasco Giurato – The Game Bag
- Giuseppe Lanci – The Prince of Homburg
- Italo Petriccione – Nirvana

1998

- **Tonino Delli Colli** – Life Is Beautiful
- Luca Bigazzi – The Acrobats
- Pasquale Mari – Rehearsals for War

1999

- **Lajos Koltai** – The Legend of 1900
- Luca Bigazzi – The Way We Laughed
- Fabio Cianchetti – Besieged

=== 2000s ===
2000

- **Luca Bigazzi** – Bread and Tulips
- **Fabio Cianchetti** – Canone inverso
- Giuseppe Lanci – The Nanny

2001

- **Lajos Koltai** – Malèna
- Franco Di Giacomo – Unfair Competition
- Roberto Forza – One Hundred Steps

2002

- **Fabio Olmi** – The Profession of Arms
- Luca Bigazzi – Burning in the Wind
- Arnaldo Catinari – Light of My Eyes

2003

- **Daniele Nannuzzi** – El Alamein: The Line of Fire
- Maurizio Calvesi – The Soul Keeper
- Gian Filippo Corticelli – Facing Windows
- Marco Onorato – The Embalmer
- Dante Spinotti – Pinocchio
- Fabio Zamarion – Respiro

2004

- **Italo Petriccione** – I'm Not Scared
- Danilo Desideri – Love Is Eternal While It Lasts
- Fabio Olmi – Singing Behind Screens
- Marco Onorato – First Love
- Fabio Zamarion –What Will Happen to Us

2005

- **Luca Bigazzi** – The Consequences of Love
- Tani Canevari – Manual of Love
- Arnaldo Catinari – The Life That I Want
- Dante Cecchin – After Midnight
- Gian Filippo Corticelli – Sacred Heart

2006

- **Luca Bigazzi** – Romanzo Criminale
- Arnaldo Catinari – The Caiman
- Fabio Cianchetti – Our Land
- Danilo Desideri – My Best Enemy
- Marcello Montarsi – Notte prima degli esami

2007

- **Fabio Zamarion** - The Unknown Woman
- Alessandro Pesci – Napoleon and Me
- Luca Bigazzi – The Family Friend
- Agnès Godard – Nuovomondo
- Fabio Olmi – One Hundred Nails

2008

- **Ramiro Civita** – The Girl by the Lake
- Luca Bigazzi – The Right Distance
- Maurizio Calvesi – I Vicerè
- Arnaldo Catinari – Parlami d'amore
- Alessandro Pesci – Quiet Chaos

2009

- **Luca Bigazzi** – Il Divo
- Arnaldo Catinari – The Demons of St. Petersberg
- Marco Onorato – Gomorrah
- Italo Petriccione – As God Commands
- Vittorio Storaro – Caravaggio

=== 2010s ===
2010

- **Daniele Ciprì** – Vincere
- Enrico Lucidi – Baarìa
- Roberto Cimatti – The Man Who Will Come
- Nicola Pecorini – The First Beautiful Thing
- Maurizio Calvesi – Loose Cannons

2011

- **Renato Berta** – We Believed
- Vittorio Omodei Zorini – 20 sigarette
- Luca Bigazzi – The Jewel
- Fabio Cianchetti – The Solitude of Prime Numbers
- Arnaldo Catinari – Angel of Evil

2012

- **Luca Bigazzi** – This Must Be the Place
- Paolo Carnera - ACAB – All Cops Are Bastards
- Simone Zampagni – Caesar Must Die
- Alessandro Pesci – We Have a Pope
- Roberto Forza – Piazza Fontana: The Italian Conspiracy

2013

- **Marco Onorato (posthumous)** – Reality
- Fabio Cianchetti – Me and You
- Gherardo Gossi – Diaz – Don't Clean Up This Blood
- Italo Petriccione – Siberian Education
- Fabio Zamarion – The Best Offer

2014

- **Luca Bigazzi** – The Great Beauty
- Jérôme Alméras – Human Capital
- Daniele Ciprì – Salvo
- Gian Filippo Corticelli – Fasten Your Seatbelts
- Gergely Poharnok – Miele

2015

- **Vladan Radovic** – Black Souls
- Fabio Cianchetti – Hungry Hearts
- Renato Berta – Leopardi
- Italo Petriccione – The Invisible Boy
- Fabio Olmi – Greenery Will Bloom Again

2016

- **Peter Suschitzky** – Tale of Tales
- Michele D'Attanasio – They Call Me Jeeg
- Maurizio Calvesi – Don't Be Bad
- Paolo Carnera – Suburra
- Luca Bigazzi – Youth

2017

- **Michele D'Attanasio** – Italian Race
- Daniele Ciprì – Sweet Dreams
- Ferran Paredes Rubio – Indivisible
- Vladan Radovic – Like Crazy
- Maurizio Calvesi – The Confessions

2018

- **Gian Filippo Corticelli** – Naples in Veils
- Tim Curtin – A Ciambra
- Gianni Mammolotti – Malarazza - Una storia di periferia
- Luca Bigazzi – Sicilian Ghost Story
- Fabrizio Lucci – The Place

2019

- **Nicolaj Brüel** – Dogman
- Michele D'Attanasio – Capri-Revolution
- Sayombhu Mukdeeprom – Call Me by Your Name
- Paolo Carnera – Boys Cry
- Hélène Louvart – Happy as Lazzaro

=== 2020s ===
2020

- **Daniele Ciprì** – The First King: Birth of an Empire
- Vladan Radovic – The Traitor
- Franco Di Giacomo – Martin Eden
- Nicolaj Brüel – Pinocchio
- Daria D'Antonio – Remember?

2021

- **Matteo Cocco** – Hidden Away
- Paolo Carnera – Bad Tales
- Luan Amelio Ukjaj - Hammamet
- Gherardo Gossi – The Macaluso Sisters
- Crystel Fournier – Miss Marx
- Michele D'Attanasio – Padrenostro

2022

- **Daria D'Antonio** – The Hand of God (ex aequo)
- **Michele D'Attanasio** – Freaks Out (ex aequo)
- Paolo Carnera – America Latina
- Luca Bigazzi – The Inner Cage
- Renato Berta – The King of Laughter

2023

- **Ruben Impens** – The Eight Mountains
- Francesco Di Giacomo – Exterior Night
- Giovanni Mammolotti – I racconti della domenica
- Maurizio Calvesi – Strangeness
- Paolo Carnera – Nostalgia

2024

- **Paolo Carnera – Io capitano**
- Davide Leone – There's Still Tomorrow
- Ferran Paredes Rubio – Comandante
- Hélène Louvart – La chimera
- Francesco Di Giacomo – Kidnapped
