= Monica Mazzitelli =

Italian-Swedish writer and film director

- Born: August 22, 1964 (age 62); Rome, Italy
- Education: Sapienza University of Rome
- Occupations: Writer, film director, culture writer

Monica Mazzitelli, (born 22 August 1964) is an Italian-Swedish writer, film director and culture writer. Born in Rome, Italy, she lives in Sweden. She has published novels, short stories, articles and reportage in Italian. She has written and directed short films and videos.

== Biography ==
Mazzitelli was born in Rome on 22 August 1964. She studied Modern Languages and Literature at Sapienza University of Rome, graduating with a thesis in psychoanalytic literary criticism on the works of Joseph Conrad.

Her first novel, Tana per la bambina con i capelli a ombrellone, was published by Rizzoli in 2008 under the pseudonym Monica Viola.

She also curated the short-story anthology Tutti giù all'inferno, published by Giulio Perrone Editore in 2007. Her short stories have appeared in several Italian anthologies.

In 2019, she published the historical novel Di morire libera with Lorusso Editore. The novel is based on the life of Michelina Di Cesare, a nineteenth-century female outlaw from southern Italy. A substantially revised edition was published in 2023 under the title Michelina Di Cesare, briganta.

The novel received an honourable mention in the 2023 Il Paese delle Donne literary prize.

As a culture writer, Mazzitelli has written for Italian cultural publications, more recently mainly for Lucy Sulla Cultura and Micromega, as well as Swedish publications including Lyktan and Parabol.

She is co-editor-in-chief of the Italian literary blog La poesia e lo spirito.

== Filmmaking ==
Mazzitelli has directed, written and produced short films and documentaries. Her films have been screened at international film festivals and have received awards.

Her documentary Dignity (2015) was filmed in Mozambique and focuses on girls living in an orphanage.

In 2020, she wrote, directed and produced the animated short film The Wedding Cake.

Made using Playmobil figures, the film tells the story of a woman forced into prostitution to pay her former husband's debts. It was screened at international film festivals, including the Göteborg Film Festival.

Other films include Midsommar (2013) and The Coltrane Code (2015).

Mazzitelli has also made several music videos, including videos for jazz pianist Daniel Karlsson and Italian singer-songwriter Andrea Chimenti.

== Works ==
The books listed below were published in Italian. The films are in various languages.

=== Books ===
- Tutti giù all'inferno, Giulio Perrone, 2007 ISBN 978-88-6004-097-8
- Tana per la bambina con i capelli a ombrellone, published under the pseudonym "Monica Viola", Rizzoli Editore, 2008, ISBN 978-88-17-02048-0
- Di morire libera, Lorusso Editore, 2019, ISBN 978-88-944427-1-7
- Michelina Di Cesare, briganta, Lorusso Editore, 2023, ISBN 979-12-81462-00-7

=== Selected anthologies ===
- Allupa allupa, DeriveApprodi, 2006 ISBN 978-88-88738-95-6
- Il lavoro e i giorni, Ediesse, 2008 ISBN 978-88-230-1307-0
- Dizionario affettivo della lingua italiana, published under the pseudonym "Monica Viola", Fandango Libri, 2008 ISBN 978-88-6044-065-5
- Versi di libertà, Mondadori Libri, 2022 ISBN 978-88-04-74519-8

=== Selected short films ===
- ''Midsommar'' (2013)
- ''Dignity'' (2015)
- ''The Coltrane Code'' (2015)
- ''The Wedding Cake'' (2020)
