= Michela De Rossi =

Italian actress (born 1993)

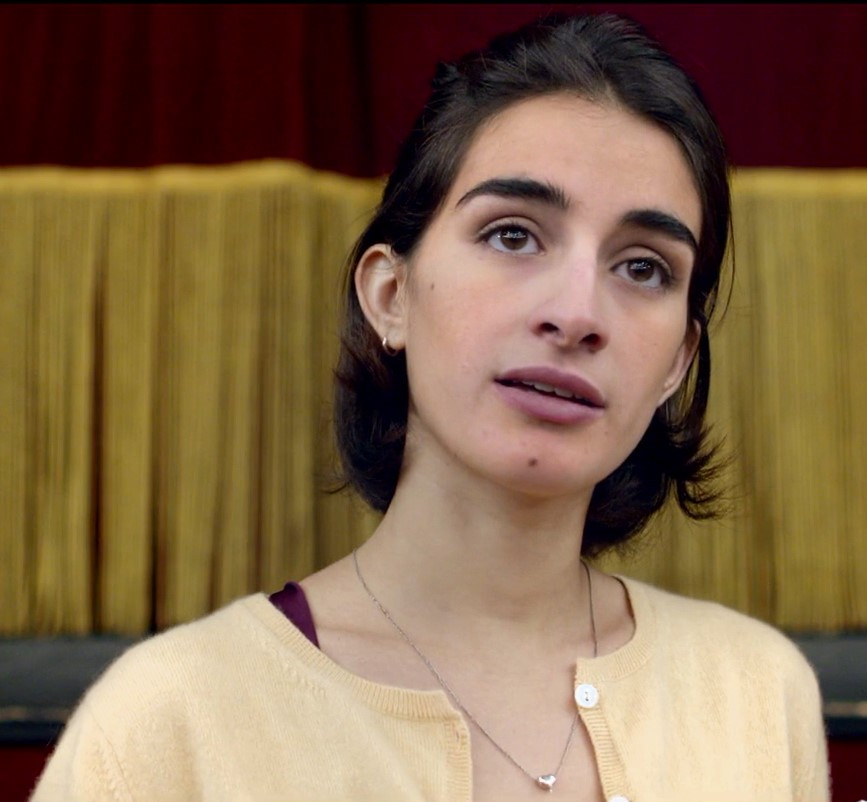
- De Rossi in 2020
- Born: 25 January 1993 (age 32); Rome, Italy
- Occupation: Actress
- Years active: 2017–present

Michela De Rossi (born 25 January 1993) is an Italian actress.

== Career ==
Born in Rome, she graduated at the Quirino International Theatre Academy in 2014.

She debuted in the 2018 drama film Boys Cry by Damiano and Fabio D'Innocenzo and then starred in the television series I topi by Antonio Albanese. In 2021, she portrayed Giuseppina Moltisanti in The Sopranos prequel The Many Saints of Newark. In 2022, she starred in lead roles in Con chi viaggi by YouNuts! and Io e Spotty by Cosimo Gomez.

== Filmography ==
Film
Year	Title	Role	Notes
2017	Primo	Marina	Short film
2018	Boys Cry	Ambra	
2018	La profezia dell'armadillo	Downtown girl	
2019	The Disappearance of My Mother		
2019	Inglourious League		Short film
2021	The Many Saints of Newark	Giuseppina Moltisanti	
2022	Con chi viaggi	Elisa	
2022	Io e Spotty	Eva	

Television
Year	Title	Role	Notes
2017	Squadra mobile	Ylenia	TV series; episode 2x02
2018–2020	I topi	Carmen Parrini	TV series; 12 episodes
2023	Django	Fanny	TV series; 3 episodes
2023	While the Men Are Away	Francesca	TV series; lead role
2024	Brigands: The Quest for Gold	Filomena	TV series; lead role
