= Capri Hollywood International Film Festival =

Annual film festival held in Capri, Italy

- Location: Capri, Italy
- Founded: 1995; 31 years ago
- Website: caprihollywood.com

The Capri Hollywood International Film Festival is an annual international film festival held every late December or early January in Capri, Italy. Established in 1995, the festival is dedicated to building a bridge between the film communities of Italy and Hollywood.

The Hollywood Reporter described it as "the last major film festival of the year" and "a key stopping point on the road to the Academy Awards."

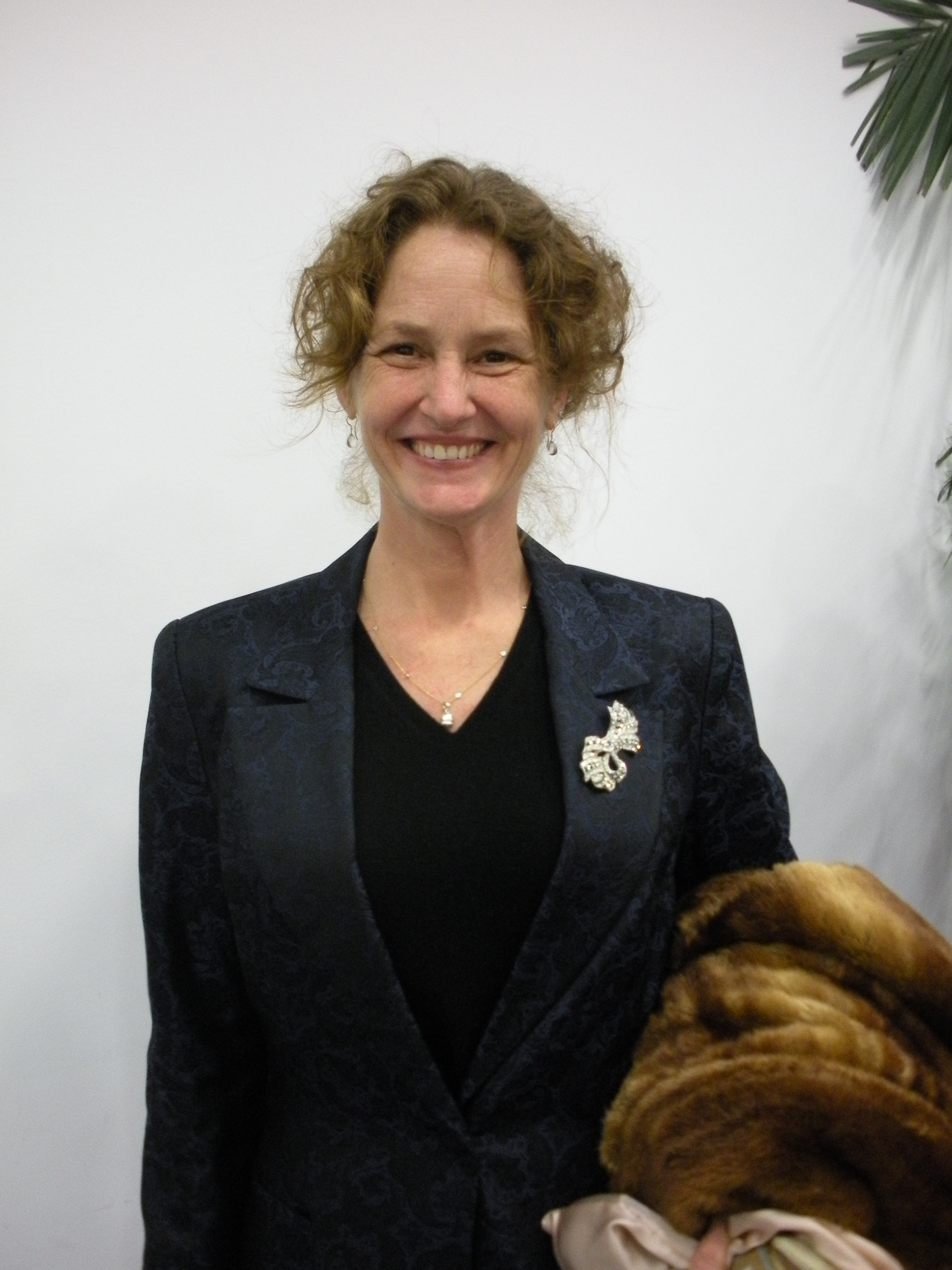
Melissa Leo at the 2011 Capri Hollywood Film Festival

== History ==
The festival was launched in 1995 by Italian journalist Pascal Vicedomini, in association with Capri In The World Institute, a non-profit organisation founded by Vicedomini. Since then, the festival holds an annual awards ceremony honouring the best in Italian and International talent. The festival is organised under the patronage of Parliamentary Assembly of the Mediterranean, and it's also supported by the Italian Ministry of Cultural Heritage, Activities and Tourism.

The festival takes place in Capri, Italy. During the COVID-19 pandemic, the festival expanded beyond Capri, and the 25th edition was organised virtually. Notable board members include Bille August, Paul Haggis, Tony Renis, Dante Ferretti, Gianni Quaranta, among others. Previous notable honourees were Jim Sheridan, Helen Mirren, Sophia Loren, Frank Langella, Dario Argento, Francesco De Gregori, Brenda Blethyn, Luca Guadagnino, Bradley Cooper, Greta Gerwig.

Each year, more than 200 films from different countries and genres are screened at the festival.

Films that had their Italian premiere at the festival include Precious (2009), Beasts of the Southern Wild (2012), 12 Years a Slave (2013), Mandela: Long Walk to Freedom (2013), Room (2015), Little Women (2019), May December (2023), among others.

Variety noted that the festival "occupies a unique spot on the global festival circuit, serving as both a final summing up of the past year in indie cinema and as a look-ahead to [the following year]."

== Competition section ==
Feature, medium-length and short films compete in the festival, with both the selections and awards determined by a designated jury board. Entries are divided into two sections: International and Italian. Films competing in the international section must not have participated in any other local festivals.

== Award categories ==
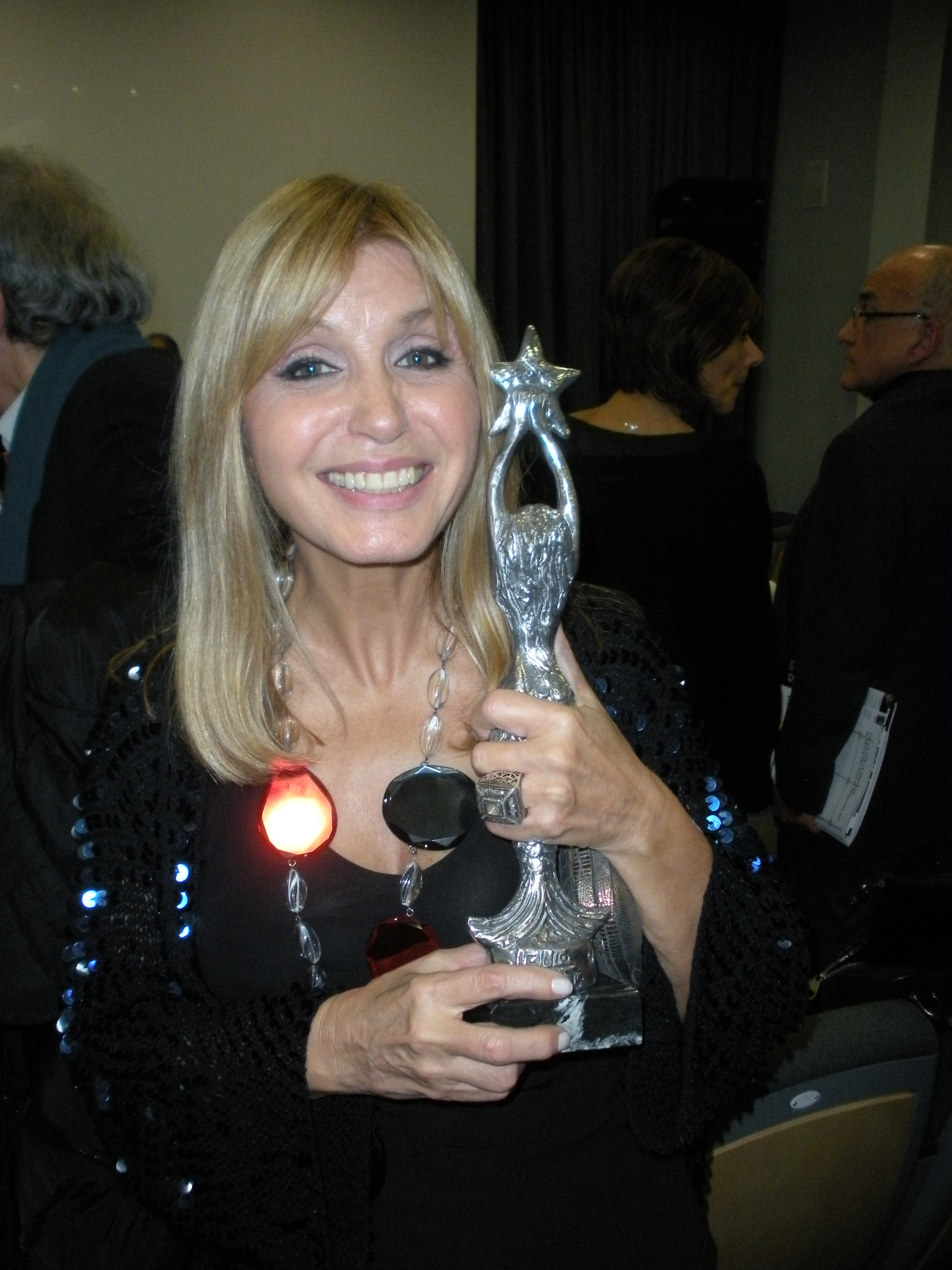
Dori Ghezzi at the 2011 Capri Hollywood Film Festival

- Best Picture
- Best Director
- Best Actor
- Best Actress
- Best Supporting Actor
- Best Supporting Actress
- Best Adapted Screenplay
- Best Original Screenplay
- Best Animated Movie
- Best Documentary Feature
- Best Foreign Language Film
- Best Cinematography
- Best Film Editing
- Best Make-up and Hairstyling
- Best Production Design
- Best Original Song
- Best Original Score
- Best Sound Editing / Best Sound Mixing
- Best Visual Effects
- Best Ensemble Cast
- Career Achievement Award

At the end of the festival, the directors of the winning films in the feature, medium, and short film categories are honoured separately.

== Winners ==
Year	Best Picture	Best Director	Best Actor	Best Actress	Ref.
2025	Frankenstein	Paul Thomas Anderson (One Battle After Another)	Leonardo DiCaprio (One Battle After Another)	Emma Stone (Bugonia)	
2024	Emilia Pérez	Edward Berger (Conclave)	Adrien Brody (The Brutalist)	Karla Sofía Gascón (Emilia Pérez)	
2023	Oppenheimer	Christopher Nolan (Oppenheimer)	Colman Domingo (Rustin)	Carey Mulligan (Maestro)	
2022	Elvis	Baz Luhrmann (Elvis)	Brendan Fraser (The Whale)	Ana de Armas (Blonde)	
2021	The Power of the Dog	Paolo Sorrentino (The Hand of God)	Peter Dinklage (Cyrano)	Lady Gaga (House of Gucci)	
2020	The Trial of the Chicago 7	Chloé Zhao (Nomadland)	Anthony Hopkins (The Father)	Sophia Loren (The Life Ahead)	
2019	The Irishman	Quentin Tarantino (Once Upon a Time in Hollywood)	Joaquin Phoenix (Joker)	Renée Zellweger (Judy)	
2018	Vice	Alfonso Cuarón (Roma)	Marcello Fonte (Dogman)	Glenn Close (The Wife)	
2017	Get Out	Christopher Nolan (Dunkirk)	James Franco (The Disaster Artist)	Frances McDormand (Three Billboards Outside Ebbing, Missouri)	
2016	La La Land	Mel Gibson (Hacksaw Ridge)	Andrew Garfield (Hacksaw Ridge) / Michael Keaton (The Founder)	Emma Stone (La La Land)	
2015	The Hateful Eight	Cary Fukunaga (Beasts of No Nation)	Samuel L. Jackson (The Hateful Eight)	Brie Larson (Room)	
2014	The Imitation Game	Morten Tyldum (The Imitation Game)	Timothy Spall (Mr. Turner)	Amy Adams (Big Eyes) / Jennifer Aniston (Cake)	
2013	August: Osage County	David O. Russell (American Hustle)	Idris Elba (Mandela: Long Walk to Freedom)	Meryl Streep (August: Osage County)	
2012	Silver Linings Playbook	J.A. Bayona (The Impossible)	Bradley Cooper (Silver Linings Playbook)	Quvenzhané Wallis (Beasts of the Southern Wild)	
2011	The Artist	Emanuele Crialese (Terraferma)	Michael Fassbender (Shame)	Bérénice Bejo (The Artist)	
