= Barbara Chichiarelli =

Italian actress

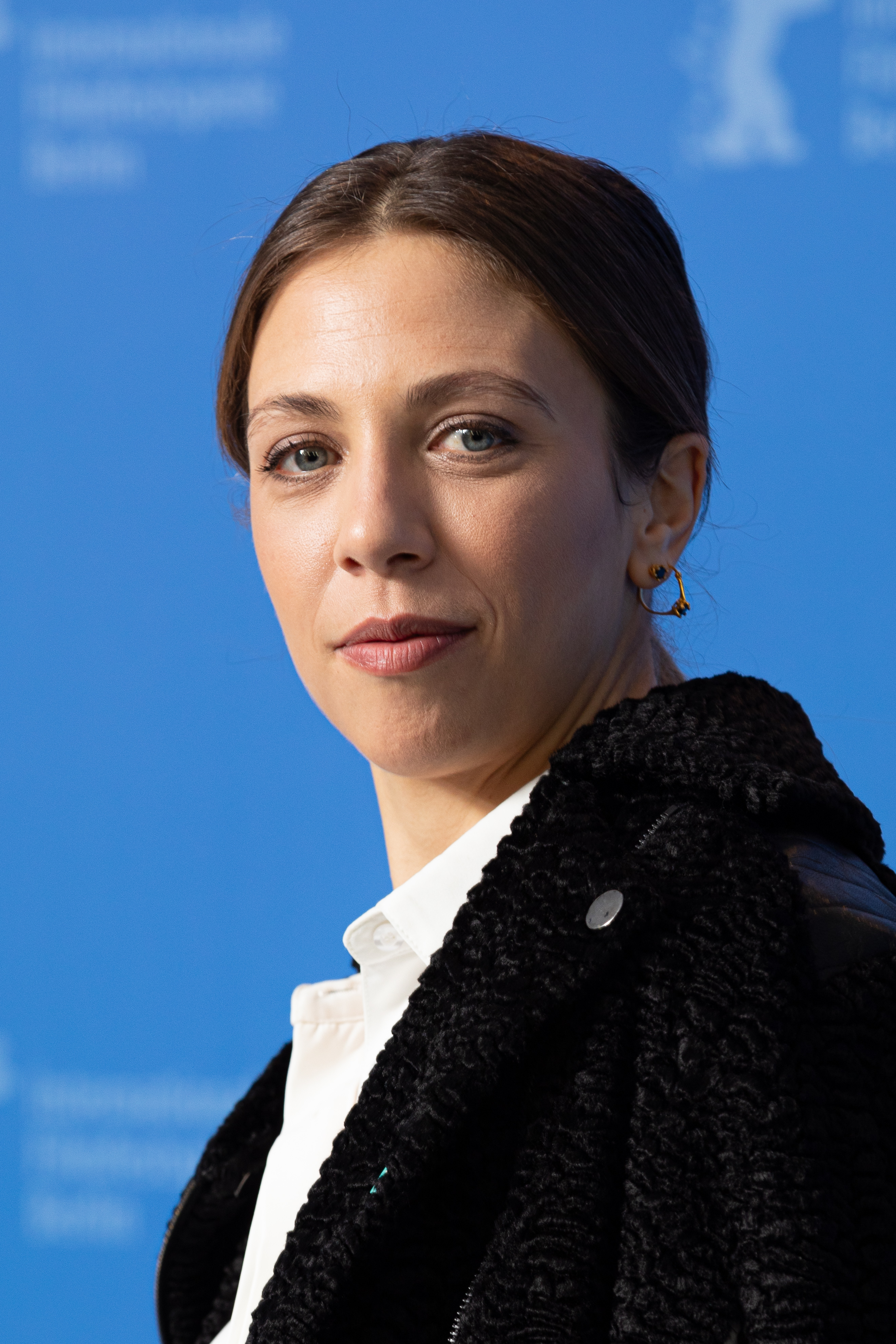
- Chichiarelli in 2020
- Born: May 20, 1985 (age 41); Rome, Italy
- Occupation: Actress
- Years active: 2006–present

Barbara Chichiarelli (born May 20, 1985) is an Italian actress.

== Early life and career ==
After graduating from the Terenzio Mamiani classical high school, she left university three exams before graduating in theater (former Department of Arts and Performing Sciences of La Sapienza), she attended the 2007–2009 academic year at the Theater Academy of Rome "Sofia Amendolea" and in 2013 she graduated from the National Academy of Dramatic Art with the essay Days of Darkness, on the homeless in Rome, staged by Gabriele Lavia.

In 2016 she received the UBU New Actor or Actress Award (under 35) together with all the performers of Santa Estasi. Atridi: eight family portraits. She was nominated as Best Supporting Actress at the Nastro d'Argento 2020 for the role of Dalila in the film Bad Tales.

== Filmography ==
=== Films ===
Year	Title	Role	Notes
2016	Valparaiso	Social worker	Short film
2019	Un'avventura	Veronica	
2019	The Goddess of Fortune	Nurse	Cameo appearance
2019	Lella	Lella	Short film
2020	Bad Tales	Dalila Placido	
2021	Mascarpone	Orsola	
2021	Blackout Love	Silvia	
2022	Swing Ride	Anna	
2024	Dieci minuti	Gloria	
2025	Come gocce d'acqua	Margherita	
2025	Amata	Carolina	

=== Television ===
Year	Title	Role	Notes
2017–2019	Suburra: Blood on Rome	Livia Adami	Main role (season 1), recurring role (season 2); 13 episodes
2019	1994	Sesa Amici	Episode: "Episodio 2"
2019–2021	La Compagnia del Cigno	Antonia Ferro	Main role (season 2), guest star (season 1); 12 episodes
2020	Il silenzio dell'acqua	Silvia Visentin	Recurring role (season 2); 4 episodes
2022	Bang Bang Baby	Inspector Ferrario	Recurring role
2023	The Good Mothers	Anna Colace	Main role; 4 episodes
2024	Antonia	Radiosa	Main role; 6 episodes
2024	Adoration	Chiara	Main role; 6 episodes
2025	Mussolini: Son of the Century	Margherita Sarfatti	Main role; 8 episodes

== Awards and nominations ==
Year	Award	Category	Work	Result	Ref.
2023	Nastri d'Argento Grandi Serie	Best Actress	The Good Mothers	Nominated	
