= Andrea Carpenzano =

Italian actor (born 1995)

- Born: 24 August 1995 (age 30); Lugo, Italy
- Occupation: Actor

Andrea Carpenzano (born 24 August 1995) is an Italian film and television actor.

== Life and career ==
Born in Lugo, the son of the director of the Department of Architecture at La Sapienza, Carpenzano grew up in Rome. In 2017, while still a student at the Liceo Classico, he made his film debut winning an audition for Francesco Bruni's Friends by Chance. For his performance, he received a Biraghi Award Special Mention at the 2017 Nastro d'Argento Awards.

=== Personal life ===
Carpenzano's sister Livia is an illustrator. Carpenzano is an AS Roma supporter.

== Filmography ==
=== Film ===
Year	Title	Role	Notes
2017	Friends by Chance	Alessandro	
2018	Boys Cry	Manolo	
2018	Via Lattea	Him	Short film
2019	The Champion	Christian Ferro	
2020	Romantic Guide to Lost Places	Michele	
2021	Lovely Boy	Nic	
2022	Swing Ride	Amanda	
2022	Chiara	Francis of Assisi	
2024	Another Summer Holiday	Altiero Molino	
2024	Una storia nera	Nicola	
2025	A Brief Affair	Andrea	

=== Television ===
Year	Title	Role(s)	Notes
2018	The Immature: The Series	Savino Ferone	8 episodes
