= Swing Ride =

2022 drama film

- Directed by: Chiara Bellosi
- Screenplay by: Luca De Bei; Maria Teresa Venditti
- Starring: Gaia Di Pietro; Andrea Carpenzano
- Cinematography: Claudio Cofrancesco
- Edited by: Carlotta Cristiani
- Music by: Fabrizio Campanelli; Giuseppe Tranquillino
- Release date: 2022
- Running time: 88 minutes
- Language: Italian

Swing Ride (Italian: Calcinculo) is a 2022 Italian-Swiss drama film directed by Chiara Bellosi and starring Gaia Di Pietro and Andrea Carpenzano. The film premiered at the 72nd Berlin International Film Festival, in the Panorama section. For his performance in this film and in Lovely Boy, Andrea Carpenzano received a Nastro d'Argento nomination for best actor.

== Cast ==
- Gaia Di Pietro as Benedetta
- Andrea Carpenzano as Amanda
- Barbara Chichiarelli as Anna
- Giandomenico Cupaiuolo as Marco
- Francesca Antonelli as Silvana
- Alessio Praticò as Mario
