= The Many Saints of Newark =

2021 crime drama film

- Release poster
- Directed by: Alan Taylor
- Written by: David Chase; Lawrence Konner
- Based on: Characters by David Chase
- Produced by: David Chase; Lawrence Konner; Nicole Lambert
- Starring: Alessandro Nivola; Leslie Odom Jr.; Jon Bernthal; Corey Stoll; Michael Gandolfini; Billy Magnussen; Michela De Rossi; John Magaro; Ray Liotta; Vera Farmiga
- Narrated by: Michael Imperioli
- Cinematography: Kramer Morgenthau
- Edited by: Christopher Tellefsen
- Production companies: New Line Cinema; Home Box Office; Chase Films
- Distributed by: Warner Bros. Pictures
- Release dates: September 22, 2021 (Tribeca); October 1, 2021 (United States)
- Running time: 120 minutes
- Country: United States
- Language: English
- Budget: $50 million
- Box office: $13.1 million

The Many Saints of Newark (marketed with the subtitle A Sopranos Story) is a 2021 American crime drama film serving as prequel to David Chase's HBO series The Sopranos (1999–2007). The film was directed by Alan Taylor, and written by Chase and Lawrence Konner. Set in Newark, New Jersey, the plot follows a violent gang war from the perspectives of mobster Dickie Moltisanti (Note: Molti santi (Italian) means "many saints".) and his teenage nephew, Tony Soprano, in the midst of the city's 1967 riots. It stars Alessandro Nivola as Dickie and Michael Gandolfini as Tony, the character played by his father in the series, with Leslie Odom Jr., Jon Bernthal, Corey Stoll, Billy Magnussen, Michela De Rossi, John Magaro, Ray Liotta, and Vera Farmiga in supporting roles. It was Liotta's final release performance before his death in 2022.

Warner Bros. Pictures and New Line Cinema obtained the rights to produce The Many Saints of Newark alongside HBO Films. The film had its world premiere at the Tribeca Fall Preview on September 22, 2021, and was theatrically released in the United States on October 1, along with a month-long simultaneous release on the HBO Max streaming service. The film received generally positive reviews from critics, with many praising the performances of Gandolfini and Nivola, though some criticized the script. While the film's theatrical release was a box-office bomb, grossing $13 million against a budget of $50 million, its simultaneous streaming service release was a success on HBO Max and contributed to a spike in viewership for The Sopranos.

== Plot ==
In 1967, a young Tony Soprano accompanies his mentor, Dickie Moltisanti, to welcome home Dickie's father, Aldo "Hollywood Dick" Moltisanti, and his new Italian bride, Giuseppina. Dickie is a soldier in the DiMeo crime family, which also includes Tony's father Johnny, a capo, and fellow soldiers such as Johnny's brother Corrado (nicknamed "Junior") and Lino Bonpensiero (nicknamed "Buddha"), as well as associates such as Hollywood Dick, Silvio Dante, Paulie Gualtieri, and Lino's son Salvatore (nicknamed "Pussy"). After white police officers assault and rob a black taxi driver, riots break out in Newark.

Watching from outside the Playland amusement park, Tony witnesses cops arresting Johnny and Junior, thus interrupting an illegal card game they were participating in. Johnny is eventually sentenced to four years in Rahway State Prison for engaging in assault with a deadly weapon during the riots. During an argument, Hollywood Dick kicks Giuseppina down a flight of stairs. Upon discovering the incident, Dickie murders him before transporting the corpse to his father's Atta Boy Drainage Supply warehouse and committing arson, burning both the body and the building.

Regretting the murder, Dickie visits his uncle Salvatore ("Sally"), his father's twin brother who is serving life in prison for killing another made man in his own family, and inherits Giuseppina as his comare. Tony is suspended from school for running a gambling operation, and Dickie makes Tony pinkie promise him to be on his best behavior in the future. Sometime later, Harold McBrayer, one of his black associates, visits him, planning to escape to North Carolina following a murder warrant for killing a looter named Leon Overall during the riots and receiving $500 ($4,828 in 2025) from Dickie as a parting gift.

Four years later, Johnny is released from prison and at a welcoming back party, he and the rest of his family are introduced to Christopher, the toddler son of Dickie, now a capo, and his wife Joanne. Simultaneously, Harold returns to Newark to form a black criminal family. Giuseppina commences a romantic affair with Harold after arguing with Dickie. After Harold kills one of Dickie's men, Giulio "Julie" DeRogatis, and steals his extortion money, Dickie, Pussy, Paulie, and Silvio question Harold's lieutenant, Cyril, and torture him with an impact wrench before Silvio shoots him dead. Harold and his gang then retaliatorily kill Buddha in a drive-by shootout with Johnny's crew. Harold and Dickie engage in a standoff, but both men disperse upon hearing police sirens.

After Tony steals the answers for his geometry exam, the school guidance counselor Mrs. Jarecki tells Tony's mother Livia that he has a high Stanford–Binet IQ and the Myers–Briggs personality traits of a leader. She relates how Tony told her about a time in which his mother hugged him and read him a book about Sutter's Mill, which he considered one of his best memories. Livia attempts to show Tony affection, but mentions how her physician, Dr. Cuomo, recommended antidepressants, antagonizing Tony when he suggests that she take them.

Outside Buddha's wake, Tony asks a hesitant Dickie if he could get Elavil for his mother. After Junior slips on the mortuary steps in the pouring rain and fractures his hip, Dickie mockingly laughs uproariously in his face, infuriating him. Dickie reconnects with Giuseppina and promises to finance a beauty parlor for her to manage. During a beachside stroll, she confesses to her romantic affair with Harold; enraged, Dickie drowns her in the ocean. He revisits Sally, who warns that everyone close to Dickie ultimately perishes, and advises him to distance himself from Tony.

Heeding Sally's advice, Dickie intentionally begins avoiding Tony, declining to visit him or answer his calls. One night, a distressed Tony throws the speakers Dickie gave him out his window, startling his father. Later on, Silvio encourages Dickie to reconcile with Tony, and Dickie relents. Before he can arrive home, Dickie is assassinated by an unknown assailant on Junior's orders. At Dickie's wake, Joanne reveals to Livia that Dickie acquired the Elavil for Tony and was carrying it in his pocket when he was murdered. Tony sadly surveys Dickie's corpse and imagines doing another pinkie promise with him, like the two had done years before. Sometime later, Harold relocates to a white neighborhood.

== Cast ==
- Alessandro Nivola as Dickie Moltisanti
- Leslie Odom Jr. as Harold McBrayer
- Jon Bernthal as Johnny Soprano
- Corey Stoll as Junior Soprano
- Michael Gandolfini as Tony Soprano
  - William Ludwig as Young Tony Soprano
- Billy Magnussen as Paulie Walnuts
- Michela De Rossi as Giuseppina Moltisanti
- John Magaro as Silvio Dante
- Ray Liotta as Aldo "Hollywood Dick" Moltisanti and Salvatore "Sally" Moltisanti, twin brothers
- Vera Farmiga as Livia Soprano
- Talia Balsam as Mrs. Jarecki
- Patina Miller as Queen Isola
- Joey Coco Diaz as Buddha, Pussy's father
- Germar Terrell Gardner as Cyril
- Michael Imperioli as Christopher Moltisanti (voice)
- Samson Moeakiola as Pussy Bonpensiero
- Alexandra Intrator as Janice Soprano
  - Mattea Conforti as Young Janice Soprano
- Gabriella Piazza as Joanne Moltisanti

Other notable appearances include Lesli Margherita as Iris Balducci, Kathryn Kates as Angie DeCarlo, Nick Vallelonga as Carmine Cotuso, Daryl Edwards as Julius, and Ed Marinaro as Jilly Ruffalo. Robert Vincent Montano and Matteo Russo play Artie Bucco at varying ages, Chase Vacnin portrays the teenage Jackie Aprile, Oberon K.A. Adjepong plays Frank Lucas, and Lauren DiMario plays the teenage Carmela De Angelis, Tony's future wife.

== Production ==
=== Development ===
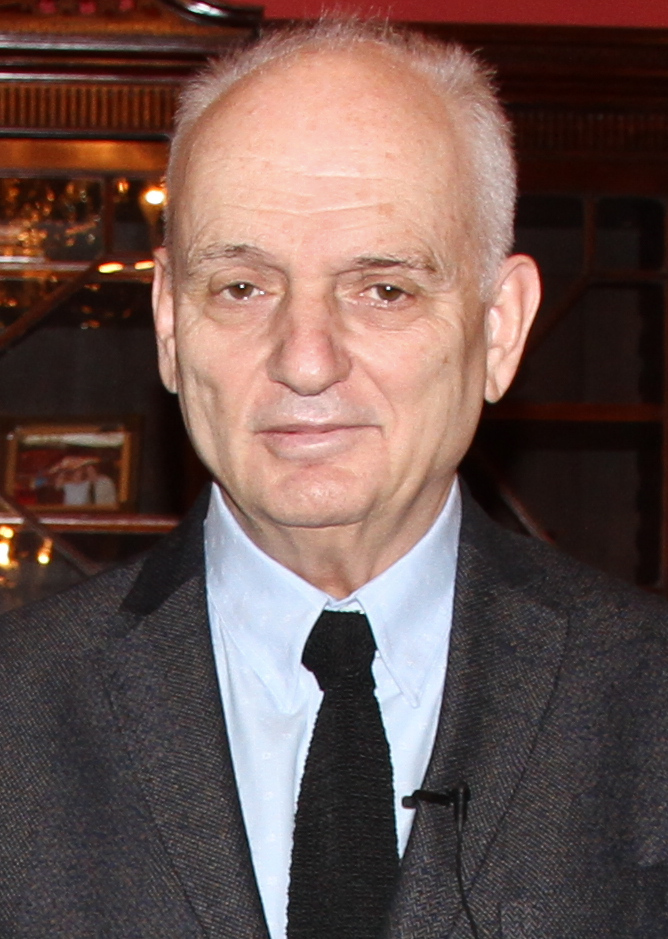
David Chase in 2015

The origins of what ultimately took shape as The Many Saints of Newark happened when David Chase finished film school, having the idea of making a film about four white men living around Newark, New Jersey, who joined the National Guard to avoid being drafted to serve in the Vietnam War only to be sent instead to the 1967 Newark riots, though the film went unproduced. Following the release of The Sopranos, it was suggested by Oz creator Tom Fontana that Chase write a film centered on Tony Soprano's father Giovanni "Johnny Boy" Soprano set in the 1930s or 1940s. The idea eventually fell aside due to Chase's lack of interest.

Chase ruled out the idea of continuing The Sopranos story in June 2017, while simultaneously expressing an interest in a prequel to the series. He had earlier been against the idea of making a film based on The Sopranos, especially a sequel to the series, given James Gandolfini's death in 2013, but became interested in Newark due to the 1967 Newark riots and his family ties to the city: "I was interested in Newark and life in Newark at that time ... I used to go to down there every Saturday night for dinner with my grandparents. But the thing that interested me most was Tony's boyhood. I was interested in exploring that", acknowledging that a prequel film could explore the period of Tony's life that he glorified in the show's early episodes.

I was against [the movie] for a long time and I'm still very worried about it, but I became interested in Newark, where my parents came from, and where the riots took place ... I was living in suburban New Jersey at the time that happened, and my girlfriend was working in downtown Newark. I was just interested in the whole Newark riot thing. I started thinking about those events and organized crime, and I just got interested in mixing those two elements.

— David Chase in 2019, writer and producer of The Many Saints of Newark

Chase said that the main storyline centers on the 1967 Newark riots and racial tensions between the Italian-American and African-American communities. Chase's biggest challenge during writing was the inclusion of many storylines for different characters. Some aspects of those storylines were dropped during editing to let the storylines "take shape" within the film's overall narrative.

In March 2018, New Line Cinema announced that it purchased the rights to produce the film along with HBO Films, with Chase co-writing the screenplay with Lawrence Konner. New Line's chairman, Toby Emmerich, stated, "David is a masterful storyteller and we, along with our colleagues at HBO, are thrilled that he has decided to revisit, and enlarge, the Soprano universe in a feature film". Chase was not concerned about alienating audiences unfamiliar to the show. For him and Konner, their intention was to tell a realistic and respectable dramatic criminal story, under the "auspices" of The Sopranos.

Alan Taylor, who directed several episodes of The Sopranos, was hired to direct the film in July 2018. Chase offered Taylor the opportunity to direct the film one day while they lunched together, feeling that Taylor had worked on the show's best episodes and had given him "the most trouble". In contrast to the show, Taylor felt that Chase allowed more creative control over the film than when he ran the show, as Chase spent most of the time outlining the story sequestered in the writer's room.

=== Casting ===
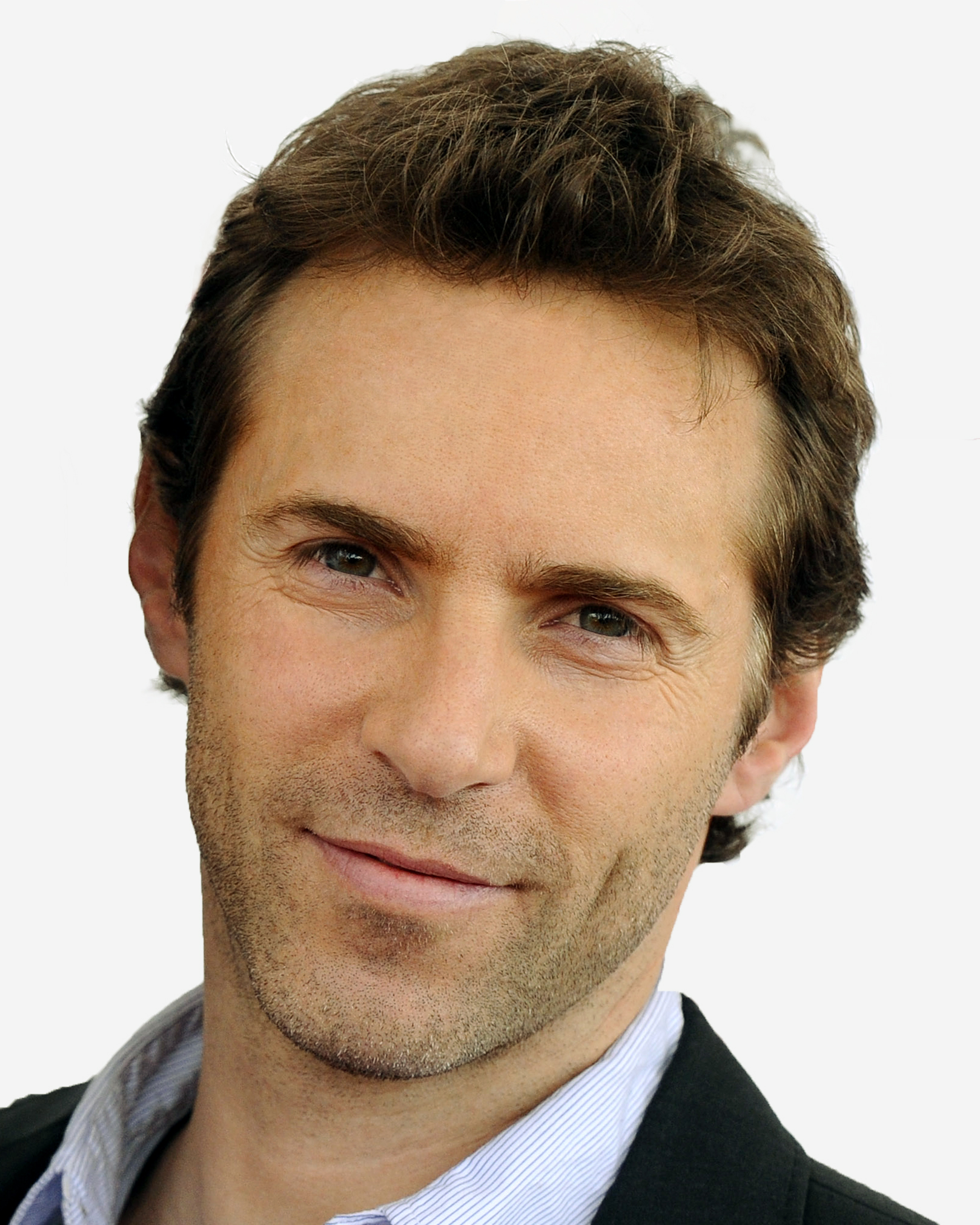
Alessandro Nivola stars as Dickie Moltisanti

In November 2018, Alessandro Nivola was cast to star in the film as Dickie Moltisanti, the father of Christopher Moltisanti. Dickie never appeared in the show despite being mentioned, though Chase did not have any plans to feature the character physically then. In January 2019, while discussing the 20th anniversary of the series, Chase revealed that a young Tony Soprano would appear in the film. Jon Bernthal, Vera Farmiga, Corey Stoll and Billy Magnussen were added to the cast that same month.

Michael Gandolfini, son of James Gandolfini, was cast in the role of young Tony. He was not immediately cast and had to audition for the role, but Taylor and Chase felt that they were right in casting him when Gandolfini thanked all the production team for allowing him to "say hello and goodbye again" to his father. Gandolfini, having never watched The Sopranos, watched the series to prepare for the role, describing it as an intense process. To keep Gandolfini's performance from being too similar to that of his father, Taylor occasionally reshot a scene if Gandolfini acted like he were already an experienced gangster, as the young Tony is "still a kid" during the film.

Ray Liotta joined the cast in February, with Leslie Odom Jr. and Michela De Rossi joining in March, as well as John Magaro, who starred in Chase's debut feature film Not Fade Away (2012). Liotta had been previously approached by Chase to appear in the third or fourth seasons of The Sopranos, but the plan did not work out.

Edie Falco filmed scenes as her character Carmela Soprano which were intended to start the film, but her scenes were cut. Taylor explained, "There was some confusion as to how best launch the movie. How to start the movie. So we tried a few things and that was one of them. If you've seen the movie you'll see that we begin it in a very different way now but that wasn't always the idea".

=== Filming ===
Principal photography began in Brooklyn on April 3, 2019, moved to Newark on May 7, and wrapped up in June 2019, with a $50 million budget. Branford Place, a street in Newark, was transformed to fit the 1960s time period for the riots, including detailed storefronts, the old Adams Theater marquee, and the neon sign for Hobby's Delicatessen. Retired Newark police officer Luther Engler served as a technical adviser for the film.

Filming also took place in Bloomfield. Satriale's Pork Store was featured in The Sopranos and was recreated in Paterson. Planned reshoots were halted upon the start of the COVID-19 pandemic, and the production returned for reshoots in September 2020, during which the filmmakers shot some aspects that improved the film's story.

The film uses the 1967 Newark riots as a backdrop for the tensions between the Italian and black communities. To accurately depict the riots, Taylor directly recreated some of the film shots from archival photos and footage of the event.

During post-production, there were discussions about whether the film's depiction of the Newark riots would still seem appropriate in the wake of the George Floyd protests, but Taylor concluded that the film's treatment of the riots would avoid controversy. Christopher Tellefsen worked as the film's editor. The editing process took longer than expected due to the COVID-19 pandemic's impact on the film industry, though Taylor felt that the extended period helped him and Chase to discuss what the film's final cut would consist of.

== Release ==
The film was initially scheduled to be released on September 25, 2020. Due to the impact of the COVID-19 pandemic on theaters and the film industry, its release date was rescheduled to March 12, 2021. It was delayed again to September 24, 2021, so it could premiere on the film festival circuit and better position itself as an awards contender, before later moving to October 1.

The film was simultaneously released in theaters and on HBO Max, for a limited period of 31 days, as part of the 2021 Warner Bros. film release schedule plans. The film had its world premiere at the inaugural Tribeca Fall Preview at the Beacon Theatre on September 22, 2021, the same date as the film's early release in the United Kingdom.

The film was released on Blu-ray, 4K Ultra HD and DVD on December 21, 2021. Special features include deleted scenes and two featurettes–"Making of Newark" and "Sopranos Family Honor". It debuted at the 33rd position for overall disc sales in the United States according to the "NPD VideoScan First Alert" chart, and the 18th position in Blu-ray sales. Blu-ray accounted for 60% of sales, with traditional Blu-ray making up 48% of the sales and Ultra HD Blu-ray making up 12%.

== Reception ==
=== Box office ===
The Many Saints of Newark grossed $8.2 million in the United States and Canada, and $4.8 million in other territories, for a worldwide total of $13.1 million.

In the United States and Canada, The Many Saints of Newark was released alongside Venom: Let There Be Carnage and The Addams Family 2, and was projected to gross around $10 million from 3,180 theaters in its opening weekend. The film made $2.1 million on its first day, and debuted to $5 million, finishing fourth at the box office. Following its less-than-expected opening weekend, Variety wrote that the film "stands to lose millions". The film dropped 69% in its second weekend to $1.9 million, finishing fifth.

=== Streaming viewership ===
The Many Saints of Newark was a streaming success. According to Samba TV, it was viewed one million times during its opening weekend. It outperformed similarly budgeted films such as Reminiscence and Cry Macho that were released on HBO Max, with WarnerMedia stating that it was streamed three times more than the second-most viewed film of the weekend. The Sopranos broke HBO Max viewership records around the time of the film's release, attributed to The Many Saints of Newark sparking renewed interest in the series. By the end of its first month, the film had been streamed in more than 2.1 million households in the United States. During its second week of availability on HBO Max, the film was the eighth most-streamed film in the United States, according to TV Time.

=== Critical response ===
On the review aggregator website Rotten Tomatoes, the film holds an approval rating of 72% based on 222 reviews, with an average rating of 6.8/10. The site's critical consensus reads, "Even as its storytelling chafes at the edges of its cinematic constraints, The Many Saints of Newark proves The Sopranos' allure is still powerful." On Metacritic, the film has a weighted average score of 61 out of 100, based on 48 critics, indicating "generally favorable reviews". Audiences polled by CinemaScore gave the film an average grade of "C+" on an A+ to F scale, while those at PostTrak gave it a 77% positive score, with 60% saying they would definitely recommend it.

In a review for The Boston Globe, Don Aucoin said that "as a Goodfellas-ish crime drama that vividly evokes time and place, Saints is rendered with enough bare-knuckled verve, unpredictability, and darkly glinting wit to make it work." In a positive review for the Chicago Sun-Times, Richard Roeper called the film "a sharply honed, darkly funny, ultra-violent and wildly entertaining late 1960s period piece" and an "immensely satisfying companion piece to The Sopranos", giving it 3.5 stars out of 4.

Owen Gleiberman of Variety called Many Saints "a sharp, lively, and engrossing movie, one that provides a fascinating running commentary on how the world of The Sopranos came into being" but noted "[the audience] can't help but notice the difference in tone" when compared to the series. David Fear of Rolling Stone said in his review "Chase has delivered something that walks the tightrope between social melodrama and fan service, and that sometimes teeters on the edge of falling."

Manohla Dargis of The New York Times called the film "a busy, unnecessary, disappointingly ordinary origin story" and said that "the best thing about The Many Saints of Newark is that it makes you think about The Sopranos, but that's also the worst thing about it." Reviewing the film for RogerEbert.com, Glenn Kenny gave the film 1.5 out of 4 stars and said: "The movie's flabbiness, its unfocused flopping from scene to scene, its disinclination to provide any individual scene with any dimension beyond its immediate impact, practically vitiates the entire theme of Dickie's ostensible mentorship of Tony Soprano." Richard Brody of The New Yorker wrote: "The Many Saints of Newark, by contrast [to The Sopranos], reduces characters of potentially mythic power to a handful of defining traits and pins them to a diorama-like backdrop of historical readymades."

== Possible sequel ==
Chase has expressed interest in producing a sequel to The Many Saints of Newark which follows Tony Soprano in his 20s, provided that he could collaborate with former Sopranos writer Terence Winter. Upon hearing this, Winter replied that he would do it "in a heartbeat. Absolutely."

Chase revealed that he received an offer from WarnerMedia to produce another season of The Sopranos which bridged the gap between the end of the film and the beginning of the original series, but admitted to The Hollywood Reporter that he was not especially interested in making such a series. He noted that he wished to make one more film set in The Sopranos universe because he had an idea of what he might do, adding: "But I don't think they want that."
