= Mozzarella Stories =

- Film poster
- Directed by: Edoardo De Angelis
- Produced by: Emir Kusturica; Fabio Massimo Cacciatori
- Starring: Luisa Ranieri; Massimiliano Gallo; Andrea Renzi; Giampaolo Fabrizio; Giovanni Esposito; Aida Turturro
- Cinematography: Ferran Paredes Rubio
- Music by: Riccardo Ceres
- Release date: 23 September 2011
- Country: Italy
- Language: Italian

Mozzarella Stories is a 2011 Italian neo noir-comedy film written and directed by Edoardo De Angelis.

It was entered into the main competition at the 38th São Paulo International Film Festival.

== Cast ==
- Luisa Ranieri: Sofia
- Luca Zingaretti:Giulio Ricci
- Giampaolo Fabrizio: Ciccio Dop
- Andrea Renzi: The Accountant
- Massimiliano Gallo: Angelo Tatangelo
- Aida Turturro: Autilia Jazz Mood
- Giovanni Esposito: Gigino Purpetta
- Valerio Foglia Manzillo: Ciriello
- Marina Suma: Sofia's mother
- Pia Velsi: Ciriello's grandmother

== See also ==
- List of Italian films of 2011
