= Matilda Lutz =

Italian model and actress (born 1991)

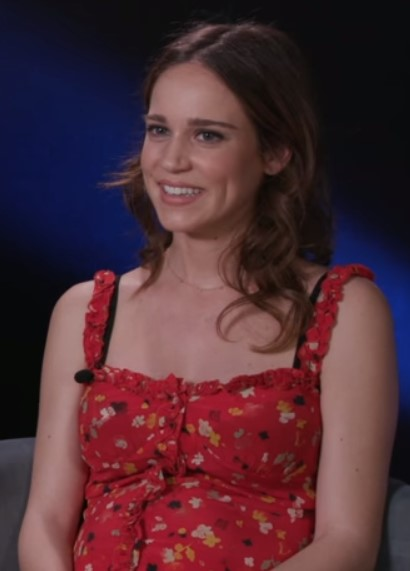
- Lutz in 2018
- Born: Matilda Anna Ingrid Lutz; 28 January 1991 (age 35); Milan, Italy
- Occupations: Actress, model
- Years active: 2011–present
- Children: 1

Matilda Anna Ingrid Lutz (born 28 January 1991) is an Italian actress and model. She starred in the 2017 horror film Rings and action thriller film Revenge. She also appeared in the Netflix series Medici, A Classic Horror Story, and Brigands: The Quest for Gold.

Lutz played the title character in the 2025 film Red Sonja.

== Early life ==
Lutz was born in Milan on 28 January 1991, the daughter of German-American photographer Elliston Lutz and Italian model Maria Licci.

== Filmography ==
=== Film ===
Key
†	Denotes films that have not yet been released

Year	Title	Role	Notes
2011	The Lost Scent in D Minor	Jessica	Short film
2012	Azzurrina	Jenny	
2013	The Fifth Wheel	Francesca	
2014	Somewhere Beautiful	Nanny	
2015	My Name Is Maya	Niki / Maya	
2016	L'Universale	Alice	
2016	Summertime	Maria	
2017	Rings	Julia	
2017	Revenge	Jennifer "Jen"	
2018	Megan (2018 film)	Megan Paulson	Short film
2019	The Divorce Party	Katie	
2021	A Classic Horror Story	Elisa	
2021	Zone 414	Jane	
2023	Reptile	Summer Elswick	
2023	Helen's Dead	Helen	
2024	Magpie	Alicia	
2025	Red Sonja	Red Sonja	
2026	Crawlers	Serena	

=== Television ===
Year	Title	Role	Notes
2013	Crossing Lines	Angela Conti	Episode: "Desperation & Desperados"
2014–2015	Fuoriclasse	Barbara Pinaider	16 episodes
2018	Medici	Simonetta Vespucci	8 episodes
2024	Brigands: The Quest for Gold	Michelina Di Cesare	6 episodes
