= Brigands: The Quest for Gold =

Italian drama television series

- Italian Netflix poster
- Italian: Briganti
- Genre: Historical drama; Adventure; War; Action
- Written by: Antonio Le Fosse; Giacomo Mazzariol; Marco Raspanti; Re Salvador; Eleonora Trucchi
- Directed by: Antonio Le Fosse; Steve Saint Leger; Nicola Sorcinelli
- Starring: Michela De Rossi; Ivana Lotito; Matilda Lutz; Orlando Cinque; Marlon Joubert; Ernesto D'Argenio
- Composer: Michele Braga
- Country of origin: Italy
- No. of seasons: 1
- No. of episodes: 6

Production
- Producer: Marco De Angelis
- Cinematography: Benjamin Maier
- Editors: Consuelo Catucci; Ian Degrassi; Ilenia Galasso
- Running time: 39–58 minutes
- Production company: Fabula Pictures

Original release
- Network: Netflix
- Release: 23 April 2024 – present

Brigands: The Quest for Gold (Italian: Briganti) is an Italian historical drama television series. It was released on Netflix on 23 April 2024.

== Premise ==
After the Risorgimento, a woman joins of group of brigands in southern Italy.

== Cast ==
- Michela De Rossi as Filomena De Marco
- Ivana Lotito as Maria "Ciccilla" Oliverio
- Matilda Lutz as Michelina Di Cesare
- Orlando Cinque as Pietro Monaco
- Marlon Joubert as Giuseppe Schiavone
- Ernesto D'Argenio as Cosimo Giordano
- Giuseppe Lo Piccolo as Salvatore
- Pietro Micci as Fumel
- Nando Paone as Ventre
- Federico Ielapi as Jurillo
- Josafat Vagni as Manzo
- Gianmarco Vettori as Marchetta
- Lorenzo de Moor as Muto
- Leon de la Vallée as Celestino
- Alessio Praticò as Don Orlando
- Giulio Beranek as Francesco Guerra
- Simone Borrelli as Alessandro Pace
- Adriano Chiaramida as Antonio Monaco
- Alida Baldari Calabria as Lissandra
- Astrid Casali as Maria
- Giampiero De Concilio as Luigi
- Salvatore Striano as Gennaro Giordano
- Simone Corbisiero as Nino
- Gianni Vastarella as Clemente

== Episodes ==
No.	Title	Duration	Original release date
1	"The Map" (La mappa)	46 min	23 April 2024
2	"The Rifle" (Il fucile)	51 min	23 April 2024
3	"The Ox" (Il bue)	54 min	23 April 2024
4	"From the Earth We Will Rise" (Dalla terra si nasce)	55 min	23 April 2024
5	"The Bride, The Assassin, and The Lunatic" (La sposa, l'assassina e la pazza)	58 min	23 April 2024
6	"The Well" (Il pozzo)	39 min	23 April 2024

== Production ==
In September 2021, Netflix announced that the series was in development, along with four other Italian productions for the platform. Filming took place in Apulia, particularly Lecce, Melpignano, Altamura, Nardò, and Brindisi.

== Release ==
The series' trailer was released on 21 March 2024.

== Reception ==
Manuela Santacatterina of The Hollywood Reporter Roma wrote that the series, in its quest to appeal to international audiences, seemed to conform to the archetype of a Netflix production rather than "finding its own uniqueness." She also noted that the series romanticized brigandage without offering much nuance. Valeria Maiolino of Cinefilos.it gave the series two-and-a-half stars out of five, but commended its set design, costumes, and makeup.

== See also ==
- Post-unification Italian brigandage
