= Andrea Lehotská =

Slovak television hostess, actress, top model

- Born: 2 December 1981 (age 44); Detva, Czechoslovakia
- Education: University of Bologna
- Occupations: television hostess, actress and model
- Years active: 2001–present
- Spouse: Stefano Bonaga (m. 2008)
- Modeling information
- Height: 172 cm (5 ft 8 in)
- Hair color: Black
- Eye color: Blue
- Website: Official website

Andrea Lehotská (born 2 December 1981) is a Slovak-Italian television hostess, actress and model.

== Biography ==
In March 2001, Lehotská was one of the twelve finalists in the Miss Slovakia contest for Miss Universe 2001.

In 2003, in Croatia, Lehotská appeared in a television advertisement for Coca-Cola.

In 2004, Lehotská was the VJ for All Music and in the cast of "Spicy Tg"; she debuted as an actress in What Will Happen to Us of Giovanni Veronesi. In 2005, she appeared in the film Fratello e padre. Also in 2005, Lehotská was in the music videos of Vasco Rossi Buoni o cattivi, Come stai, Un senso E... and Señorita. On September 9, 2005, Rossi released the double DVD È solo un Rock 'n Roll show (with 12 music videos) with Lehotská as protagonist.

From 2005 to 2008, she was a columnist for the television program Markette. In 2007, she was a finalist in Uno due tre stalla, reality show of Canale 5.

In 2008, she played the role of Bibi in the film Albakiara directed by Stefano Salvati. In 2009 she is in the cast of fiction Giochi sporchi for Rai 4.

From 2009 to 2010, Lehotská was a co-protagonist in Una cena di Natale quasi perfetta on Sky Uno, and in Sugo, a television program on Rai 4.

From 2009 to 2011, she was a co-protagonist in Chiambretti Night, a television program of Mediaset, and in 2011 Lehotská was a co-protagonist in Chiambretti Sunday Show on Italia 1.

In 2011, she has presented Circo Massimo on Rai 3/RSI La 2. She was also the protagonist of music video Hayat Öpücüğü of Murat Boz.

In 2012, she was the third finalist of L'isola dei famosi, a reality show. From 2012 to 2016, she presented Circo Estate on Rai 3. and the International Circus Festival of Monte-Carlo on Rai 3.

In 2013 Andrea Lehotská presented Cena je správna on TV JOJ. In 2017, she played the role of Regina in the film Friends by Chance directed by Francesco Bruni.
