= Io e Spotty =

2022 Italian comedy film

- Directed by: Cosimo Gomez
- Written by: Cosimo Gomez; Luca Infascelli
- Produced by: Carlo Macchitella; Manetti Bros.
- Starring: Michela De Rossi; Filippo Scotti
- Cinematography: Francesca Amitrano
- Edited by: Federico Maria Maneschi
- Music by: Pivio and Aldo De Scalzi
- Release date: 7 July 2022 (Italy)
- Country: Italy
- Language: Italian

Io e Spotty (lit. 'Me and Spotty') is a 2022 Italian comedy film directed by Cosimo Gomez.

== Distribution ==
The film was released in Italian cinemas on July 7, 2022.

== Cast ==
- Michela De Rossi as Eva
- Filippo Scotti as Matteo
- Paola Minaccioni as Daniela, Eva's mother
- Violetta Zironi as Sissi
- Alessia Giuliani as Dr. Casani
- Laura Dondoli as Sandra
- Rosa Canova as Viola
- Gelsomina Pascucci as Monica
- Mario Russo as Nicola
- Francesco Turbanti as Riccardo
- Giacomo Tamburini as Vito
- Vito as the man in the bar
