= Trick (2026 film) =

2026 Italian drama film

- Italian: Scherzetto
- Directed by: Mario Martone
- Screenplay by: Mario Martone; Ippolita Di Majo
- Based on: Trick by Domenico Starnone
- Produced by: Maria Carolina Terzi; Carlo Lorenza; Luciano Stella; Mauro Luchetti
- Starring: Toni Servillo; Lorenzo Perrotta; Serena Rossi; Leonardo Lidi
- Cinematography: Paolo Carnera
- Edited by: Jacopo Quadri
- Music by: Valerio Vigliar
- Production companies: Mad Entertainment; Rai Cinema
- Distributed by: 01 Distribution
- Release dates: 10 September 2026 (Venice); 2027 (Italy)
- Running time: 112 minutes
- Country: Italy
- Language: Italian

Trick (Italian: Scherzetto) is a 2026 Italian drama film directed by Mario Martone, co-written with Ippolita Di Majo and based on the 2016 novel of the same name by Domenico Starnone. It stars Toni Servillo, Lorenzo Perrotta, Serena Rossi, and Leonardo Lidi.

The film had its world premiere out of competition at the 83rd Venice International Film Festival on 10 September 2026.

== Premise ==
Daniele Mallarico, a famed illustrator, looks after his unruly grandson in Naples while his parents are away.

== Cast ==
- Toni Servillo as Daniele Mallarico
- Lorenzo Perrotta as Mario, Daniele's grandson
- Serena Rossi as Betta, Daniele's daughter and Mario's mother
- Leonardo Lidi as Saverio, Mario's father
- Giovanni Ludeno
- Gianluca Di Gennaro

== Production ==
The film was announced by director Mario Martone in January 2026. It's produced by Maria Carolina Terzi, Carlo Lorenza and Luciano Stella, Mauro Luchetti for MAD Entertainment, with support from Rai Cinema in association with EDI Effetti Digitali Italiani and Picomedia.

Principal photography began on 11 February 2026. Filming took place over two months in Naples. Paolo Carnera was the director of photography.

== Release ==
Rai Cinema International Distribution owns the international sales rights to the film, which was presented at the Marché du Film in May 2026. Following its teaser presentation, the film was acquired for distribution by Paradiso Films in the Benelux, Orta Film in Brazil, Morandini in Switzerland, Dream Team Film in Greece, Leopardo Filmes in Portugal, and Cinelibri in Bulgaria.

The film had its world premiere out of competition at the 83rd Venice International Film Festival on 10 September 2026. It will be theatrically released in Italy by 01 Distribution in 2027.

== Reception ==
The Film Verdict's critic Deborah Young praised the film, describing it as "slyly amusing", and writing it "lives in a world of its own, a happy outlier on the Italian film scene where so many presumed comedies feel like reruns of their predecessors." Matthew Joseph Jenner from International Cinephile Society also lauded the film, giving it a 4/5 rating and calling it "a quaint delight that balances different tones in a masterful and often quite surprising way". Jack Walters from Next Best Picture noted Toni Servillo's performance was the highlight of the film, and argued Trick "mostly thrives due to its fascination with nostalgia and our tempting ability to view the world in a way that may not objectively mirror reality".

Camillo De Marco from Cineuropa described the film as "a modest study of the boundaries of one’s own talent and the salvaging of a lost identity". Peter Bradshaw from The Guardian panned it, giving the film a 2/5 rating and calling it a "part spooky, part sentimental oddity", "weirdly toggling between the uncanny and the sweetly sentimental".
