= Lovely Boy =

2021 drama film

- Directed by: Francesco Lettieri
- Screenplay by: Francesco Lettieri; Peppe Fiore
- Produced by: Nicola Giuliano; Francesca Cima; Carlotta Calori
- Starring: Andrea Carpenzano
- Cinematography: Gianluca Palma
- Edited by: Mauro Rodella
- Music by: Paco Martinelli
- Release date: 2021
- Language: Italian

Lovely Boy is a 2021 Italian drama film co-written and directed by Francesco Lettieri and starring Andrea Carpenzano. It premiered at the 78th edition of the Venice Film Festival.

== Cast ==
- Andrea Carpenzano as Nic / Lovely Boy
- Daniele Del Plavignano as Daniele
- Ludovica Martino as / Fabi
- Enrico Borello as Borneo
- Riccardo De Filippis as Padella
- Pierluigi Pasino as Lorenzo
- Martino Perdisa as Martino
- Federica Rosellini as Cecilia

== Production ==
The screenplay was written during the second month of lockdown because of the COVID-19 pandemic. Principal photography started in April 2021. The film was produced by Indigo Film in co-production with Vision Distribution and Sky Italia. It was shot between Rome and Trentino-Alto Adige.

== Release ==
The film premiered at the 79th Venice International Film Festival, as the closing film of the Giornate degli Autori sidebar. It had a limited release in Italian cinemas on 13 September 2021.

== Reception ==
La Stampa critic Gianmaria Tammaro wrote that the film "tells a story of drug addiction without lapsing into qualunquism or clichés; the characters are real, concrete, and multifaceted" and it's "a film that does not need to shout, that knows how to maintain a balance, and that closes without really closing: the final scene is almost a new beginning, not a conclusion; and there is never, even for a second, a judgmental or patronizing tone".

Amber Wilkinson from Eye for Film gave the film three points out of five, noting that "Aside from the slightly unusual music scene setting [...] there's little here to distinguish this from many similar addiction tales. [...] The heart of Lettieri's heart is definitely in the right place, but it doesn't have a particularly strong or unique beat."

For his performance in this film and in Swing Ride, Andrea Carpenzano received a Nastro d'Argento nomination for best actor.
