= Antonia (TV series) =

2024 Italian television series

- Promotional release poster
- Genre: Comedy drama
- Written by: Elisa Casseri; Carlotta Corradi; Chiara Martegiani
- Directed by: Chiara Malta
- Starring: Chiara Martegiani; Valerio Mastandrea; Barbara Chichiarelli; Emanuele Linfatti; Leonardo Lidi; Chiara Caselli
- Composer: Tom Chichester-Clark
- Country of origin: Italy
- Original language: Italian
- No. of seasons: 1
- No. of episodes: 6

Production
- Executive producer: Jean Elia
- Producers: Daniele Basilio; Silvio Maselli; Andrea Paris; Matteo Rovere
- Cinematography: Luigi Martinucci
- Editors: Natalie Cristiani; Federico Mascolini
- Running time: 30 minutes
- Production companies: Groenlandia, Fidelio

Original release
- Network: Amazon Prime Video
- Release: 4 March 2024

Antonia is an Italian television series directed by Chiara Malta. Produced by Groenlandia, Fidelio, in association with Rai Fiction and starring Chiara Martegiani, Valerio Mastandrea, Barbara Chichiarelli, Emanuele Linfatti, Leonardo Lidi and Chiara Caselli. It premiered on Amazon Prime Video on 4 March 2024.

== Cast ==
- Chiara Martegiani as Antonia
- Valerio Mastandrea as Manfredi
- Barbara Chichiarelli as Radiant
- Emanuele Linfatti as Michele
- Leonardo Lidi as Marco
- Chiara Caselli as Deanna

== Production ==
The series was announced on Amazon Prime Video. The filming took place in Rimini, Italy.

== Reception ==
The series was reviewed for Cineuropa by Vittoria Scarpa and by Aldo Grasso for IO Donna.

== Awards and nominations ==
Year	Award	Category	Result	Ref.
2024	Nastri d'argento Grandi serie	Best Dramedy	Nominated	
2024	Nastri d'argento Grandi serie	Best Screenplay	Won	

== See also ==
- List of Amazon Prime Video original programming
