= Marcello Fonte =

Italian actor

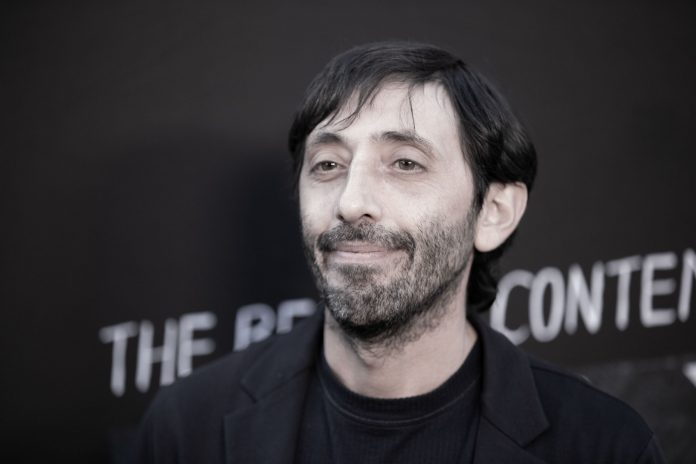
- Born: 7 November 1978 (age 47); Melito di Porto Salvo, Calabria, Italy
- Occupation: Actor
- Years active: 1997–present

Marcello Fonte (born 1978) is an Italian actor. He received the Cannes Film Festival Award for Best Actor for his role in the film Dogman.

== Early life and education ==
Fonte lived his childhood and adolescence in the suburbs of Reggio Calabria, where at the age of 10 he learned to play the snare drum in the town's band. He then moved to Rome in 1999, where he worked as guardian at the Teatro Valle. Here he became passionate about acting, and was given small parts in television and film productions.

== Awards and nominations ==
In 2018, Fonte received critical acclaim for his performance in Matteo Garrone's Dogman. The role earned him the Best Actor Award at the 2018 Cannes Film Festival, the European Film Award for Best Actor at the 31st European Film Awards, the Best Actor Award at the 23rd Capri Hollywood International Film Festival, and the FIPRESCI Award for Best Actor in a Foreign Film at the 30th Palm Springs International Film Festival. He was also nominated for Best Actor at the 64th David di Donatello Awards.

== Partial filmography ==
=== Film ===
- Unfair Competition (2001)
- The Order (2003)
- Blood of the Losers (2008)
- Heavenly Body (2011)
- Asino vola (2015)
- Dogman (2018)
- Io sono Tempesta (2018)
- Pinocchio (2019)
- Vivere (2019)
- The New Gospel (2020)
- The Turning Point (2022)
- Il sesso degli angeli (2022)
- The Resurrection of the Christ: Part One (2027)

=== TV ===
- Stracult (2001)
- Don Matteo (2001)
- Diritto di difesa (2004)
- The Mafia Kills Only in Summer (2016)
- I Know This Much Is True (2020)
