= Roberto Forza =

Italian film cinematographer

- Born: 26 September 1957 (age 68); Rio de Janeiro, Brazil
- Occupation: Cinematographer

Roberto Forza (born 26 September 1957) is an Italian film cinematographer.

Forza was born in Rio de Janeiro, Brazil of Italian parents who had moved to South America a few years earlier. In 1961 his parents decided to move back to Turin, where he graduated as a mechanical engineer in 1977. In the same period, he developed a passion for cinema and attended the courses of history of cinema held by film critic and author Gianni Rondolino.

From 1983 to 1987, he was a cameraman at the RAI production center in Milan, working in a large number of television programs, series and TV-movies. He then left RAI to devote himself to a freelance profession, working in the field of advertising, documentary and short film industry. He debuted as film cinematographer in 1993, with Punto di fuga.

In 2001 Forza was nominated to David di Donatello for best cinematography for the Marco Tullio Giordana's drama film One Hundred Steps; from then he started a long professional relationship with Giordana, both in the fields of cinema and television. Forza received a second David di Donatello nomination in 2012, for Giordana's Piazza Fontana: The Italian Conspiracy.
