= Er Canaro =

Italian murderer

Pietro De Negri, better known as Er Canaro (Roman dialect: "the dog keeper"; born 28 September 1956), is an Italian criminal, a dog coiffeur (hence the nickname) and a cocaine addict.

De Negri was born at Calasetta, in Sardinia. Later he lived in the Rome's neighbourhood of Magliana. At the age of 31, he killed former boxer, local tough guy, and fellow cocaine addict Giancarlo Ricci. The so-called "Crime of the Canaro" (Italian: Delitto del Canaro) is notable for being one of the most gruesome crimes carried out in Italy since the end of World War II, particularly because the victim watched powerlessly during the excessive mutilation.

== Murder of Giancarlo Ricci ==
On 18 February 1988, Ricci entered into Pietro De Negri's shop as usual, beating and slapping him as he had on previous occasions. De Negri had been a victim of Ricci's physical abuse before, but had conceived a plan to kill him. He told Ricci that a cocaine pusher was coming into the shop, and that if Ricci would hide himself in a dog cage, they could steal the pusher's cocaine and money. As soon as Ricci entered into the cage, De Negri locked him inside. He tortured Ricci for seven hours, left him tied with a chain, went to his daughter's school to take her home, and later returned to his shop.

According to De Negri's testimony Ricci was tortured to death, with some of his fingers having been removed and put inside bodily orifices. Pieces of his face were cut, his tongue was removed, and his penis was put into his mouth, which caused him to die of asphyxiation, according to the post-mortem. De Negri also claims he pierced one of Ricci's eyes with the cut fingers, smashed his teeth and head with a pipe wrench, and "washed" his brain with dog shampoo.

However, the post-mortem revealed that most of the torture described by De Negri had only been imagined by the man, who probably confused thought and reality as a result of his excessive consumption of cocaine. The boxer had been killed with a hammer, in no more than 40 minutes as opposed to the 7 hours of torture claimed by De Negri; no shampoo was used, nor had his cranium been opened, just some fingers were amputated post mortem.

The morning after, Ricci's body was found in a landfill, still smoking, as De Negri had thrown fuel onto the body and tried to burn it. A man admitted to driving Ricci to De Negri's shop the day of the murder, and De Negri confessed. After conviction, he served 16 years out of his 24-year prison sentence.

== In popular culture ==
The life and the incident of the murder has been adapted into two 2018 films called Dogman and Dogman's Rabies.
