= Romantic Guide to Lost Places =

2020 film by Giorgia Farina

- Film poster
- Italian: Guida romantica a posti perduti
- Directed by: Giorgia Farina
- Written by: Giorgia Farina; Carlo Salsa; Heidrun Schleef
- Produced by: Anastasia Michelagnoli; Rita Rognoni
- Starring: Clive Owen; Jasmine Trinca; Irène Jacob; Andrea Carpenzano
- Cinematography: Timo Salminen
- Edited by: Paola Freddi
- Music by: Emanuele de Raymondi
- Production companies: Oplon Film; Rai Cinema
- Distributed by: Lucky Red
- Release dates: September 8, 2020 (Venice); September 24, 2020 (Italy)
- Running time: 106 minutes
- Countries: Italy; United States
- Language: Italian

Romantic Guide to Lost Places (Italian: Guida romantica a posti perduti) is a 2020 Italian-American drama film, co-written and directed by Giorgia Farina.

== Cast ==
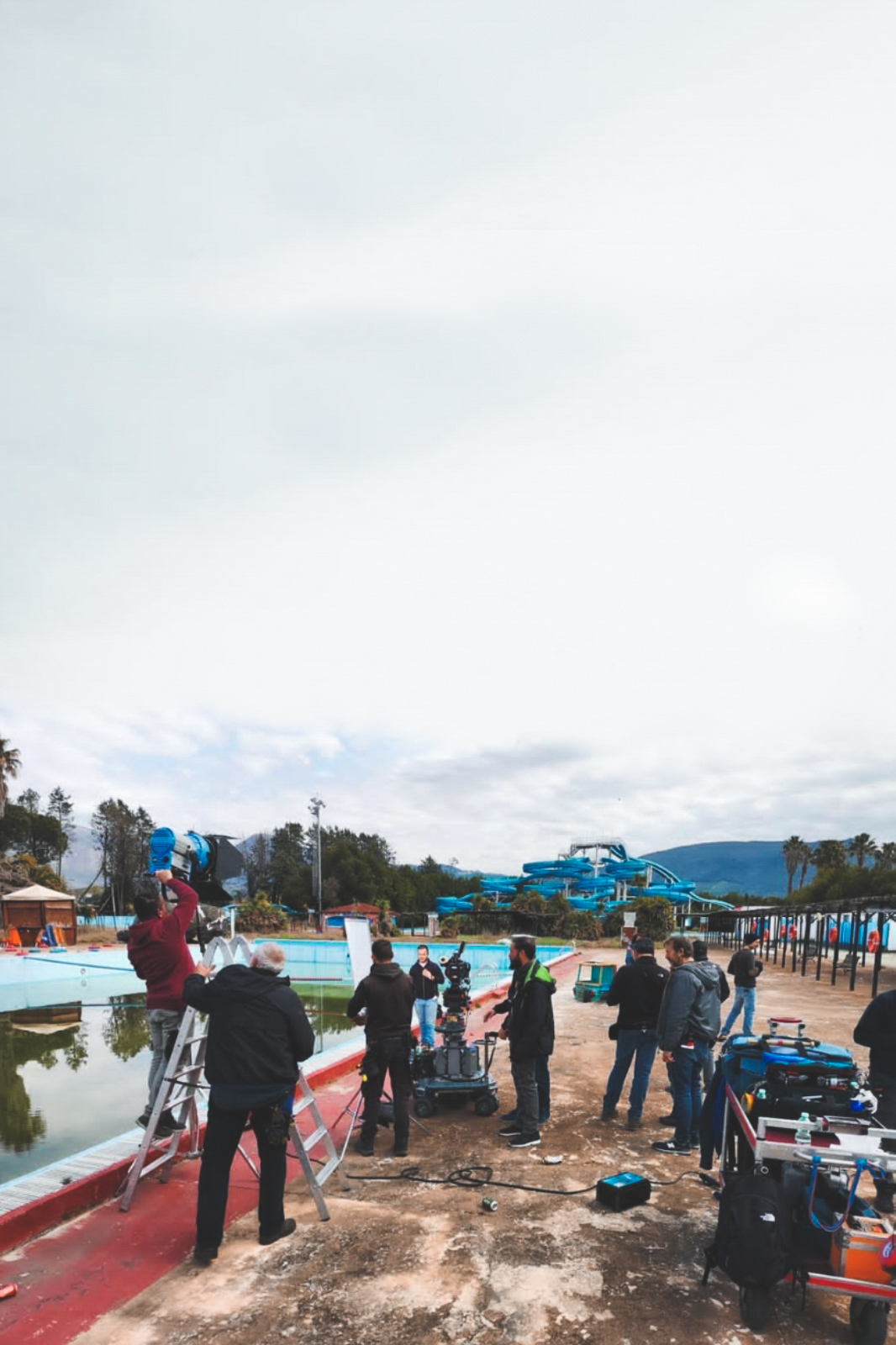
The park Aquapiper in Guidonia Montecelio during the shooting of the film

- Clive Owen (dubbed by Fabio Boccanera) as Benno
- Jasmine Trinca as Allegra
- Irène Jacob as Brigitte
- Andrea Carpenzano as Michele
- Edoardo Gabbriellini as Cristian
- Valentin Oudin

== Release ==
The film was presented as a special event in the Venice Days section of the 77th Venice International Film Festival on September 8, 2020, and released theatrically in Italy on September 24 of the same year.

== Accolades ==
- 2020 – Venice Film Festival
  - Fred Award to Jasmine Trinca
