= Michelina Di Cesare =

Italian bandit

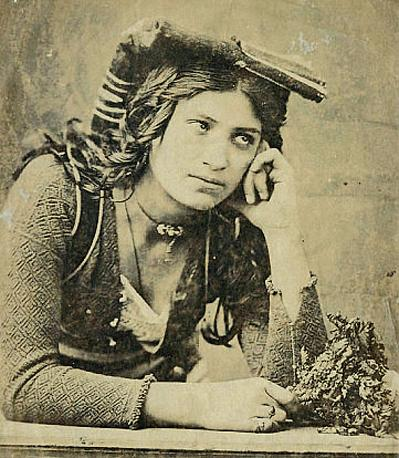
- Born: 28 October 1841; Caspoli, Kingdom of the Two Sicilies
- Died: 30 August 1868 (aged 26); Mignano Monte Lungo, Kingdom of Italy
- Other name: La Brigantessa

Michelina Di Cesare (1841–1868), also known as La Brigantessa, was a member and perhaps a leader of the brigands in Southern Italy who fought against the Italian authority after the unification of Italy.

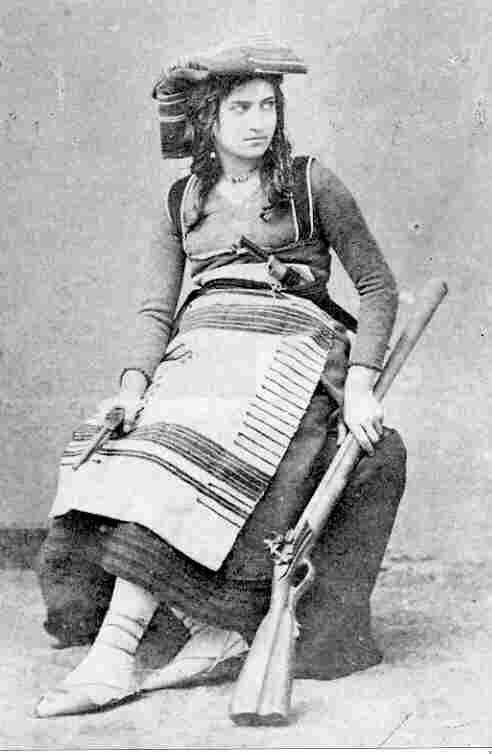
Michelina Di Cesare

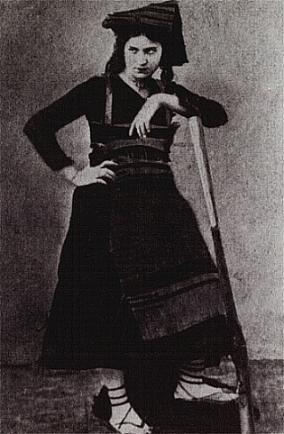
Michelina Di Cesare

== Biography ==
Michelina was born to a very poor family in Caspoli, a hamlet of Mignano Monte Lungo, in the province of Terra di Lavoro, nowadays in the province of Caserta. Her brother and their parents, Domenico Antonio Di Cesare and Giuseppa Diodati, were labourers. According to the mayor of Mignano, even when she was a child, Michelina would conduct small thefts in the surroundings of Caspoli.

In 1861, she married Rocco Tenga, who died the following year, leaving her a widow at age 20. In 1862, she met Francesco Guerra, a former Bourbon soldier and deserter, who joined Rafaniello's band and soon became its leader. Michelina and Guerra became partners, and the former joined the latter in hiding; this was described by the brigand Ercolino Rasti in 1863, who was under interrogation. There was speculation that Di Cesare and Guerra were married in the church of Galluccio, even if there is no record of the marriage.

At the time, these brigands did not consider themselves bandits. Instead, they viewed themselves as superior to simple thieves because they were waging guerrilla warfare against Northern Italian "foreigners", who had overthrown their King and conquered their homeland.

Di Cesare was a prominent collaborator of Guerra, the ringleader, as revealed in the testimony of Domenico Compagnone, who, under interrogation said: "The gang is composed of 21 individuals, including the two women who are together with Fuoco and Guerra, of which Guerra's [Di Cesare] is also armed with two shotguns and pistol. Of the gang [only] the leaders are armed with two-shot rifles and pistols, with the exception of the two aforementioned leaders who hold revolvers". Therefore, not only was Michelina Di Cesare an effective member of the gang, but from the weapons she carried, it appears that she was one of its recognized leaders.

The gang's combat tactics were typically guerrilla. Actions would be carried out by small groups and once the attack was over, the brigands would quietly disperse and reunite at pre-established points.

Michelina's gang, sometimes working alone and sometimes with other known local gangs, operated for several years (from 1862 to 1868) in the mountainous territory between Mignano and the surrounding towns, making assaults, robberies and kidnappings. One attack on the village of Galluccio was unique because it featured some robbers disguised as police and pretending to have arrested other robbers, and the group simply marched into the town unchallenged. Their raids did not slow down even after 1865, when gangs like Michelina's were sharply reduced in many other areas of southern Italy.

In 1868, General Emilio Pallavicini of Priola was sent with a mission to finally end banditry in the area. Using both armed action and financial rewards for information about the gang, they finally caught the famed group. A spy caught Michelina and her man in their sleep. She was first wounded as she attempted to flee and was killed by a group of soldiers.

As a final outrage, the bodies of the brigands, including Michelina, were stripped bare and left on display in the central square of Mignano as a warning to the local population.

== In popular culture ==
Michelina Di Cesare is one of the main characters of the Netflix series Brigands: The Quest for Gold (2024), played by the actress Matilda Lutz.

She is also one of the two titular characters of the stage play Mickey & Joe: Good. Bad. Ugly. Dirty. (2025), written by her descendant, Canadian playwright Michaela Di Cesare.

== See also ==
- Phoolan Devi
