= Edoardo De Angelis =

Italian film director and screenwriter

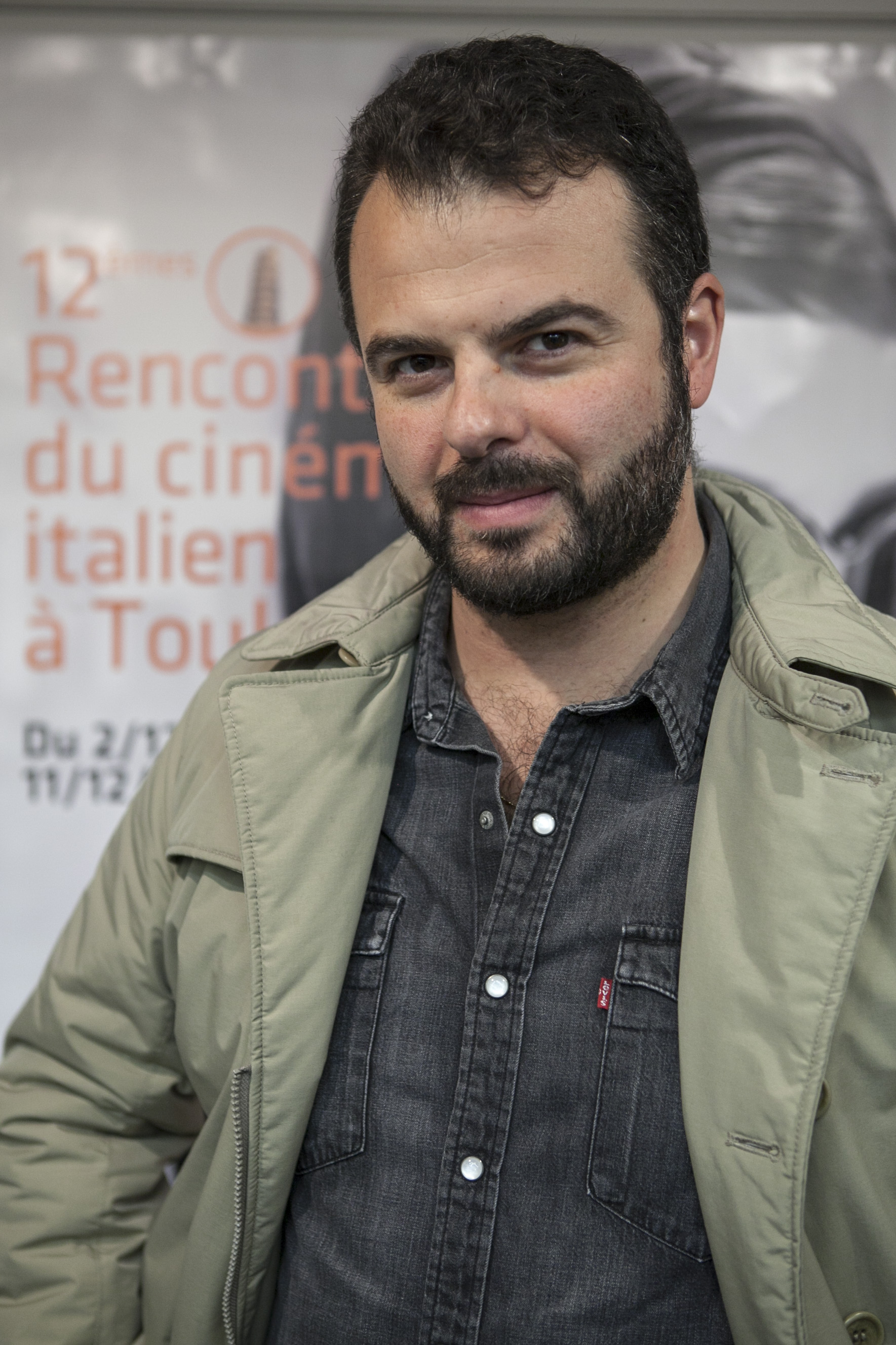
- Born: 31 August 1978 (age 48); Naples, Italy
- Occupations: Screenwriter; director; producer
- Years active: 2000–present

Edoardo De Angelis (born 31 August 1978) is an Italian film and television writer, director and producer. He is best known for the war drama film Comandante (2023), which opened the 80th Venice International Film Festival.

== Biography ==
In 2006 he graduated in directing at the Centro Sperimentale di Cinematografia. In 2011, he made his debut feature film Mozzarella Stories. Serbian director Emir Kusturica in an interview granted to Il Venerdì di Repubblica called Edoardo De Angelis a "visionary talent".

In 2014 he made his second feature film Perez., presented in an official selection out of competition at the 71st Venice International Film Festival.

In 2016 he wrote and directed Indivisible, presented at Venice Days as part of the 73rd Venice International Film Festival. The film won 6 David di Donatello Awards and 5 Silver Ribbons.

His fourth film, The Vice of Hope, has been presented at the 2018 Rome Film Festival and awarded with the BNL People's Choice Award.

== Filmography ==
Year	Title	Director	Writer	Producer	Notes
2011	Mozzarella Stories	Yes	Yes	No	Feature film debut
2014	Perez.	Yes	Yes	Yes	
2014	Andiamo a quel paese	No	Yes	No	Co-writer
2016	Vieni a vivere a Napoli	Yes	Yes	No	Segment: "Magnifico shock"
2016	Indivisible	Yes	Yes	No	
2017	It's the Law	No	Yes	No	Co-writer
2018	The Vice of Hope	Yes	Yes	Yes	
2018	Vengo anch'io	No	Yes	No	
2020	Natale in casa Cupiello	Yes	Yes	No	Television movie
2021	Sabato, domenica e lunedì	Yes	Yes	No	Television movie
2021	Non ti pago	Yes	Yes	No	Television movie
2021	Maradona: Blessed Dream	Yes	No	No	Television series; 3 episodes
2022	Una Femmina: The Code of Silence	No	Yes	Yes	Story by
2023	Comandante	Yes	Yes	Yes	
2023	The Lying Life of Adults	Yes	Yes	Yes	Television series; also creator
2025	Champagne: Peppino di Capri	No	No	Yes	Television movie
2026	The Fire Within You	Yes	Yes	No	
