= Paolo Carnera =

Italian film cinematographer

- Born: 2 April 1957 (age 69); Venice, Veneto, Italy
- Occupation: Cinematographer

Paolo Carnera (born 2 April 1957) is an Italian film cinematographer.

== Life and career ==
Born in Venice, Carnera attended the Centro Sperimentale di Cinematografia in Rome between 1980 and 1982, studying under Carlo Di Palma. Between the eighties and the nineties he worked in many low-budget first and second works, including the debut of several former classmates at the Centro Sperimentale, notably Francesca Archibugi, for whom he cared the photography of some shorts and later of her second and third feature films. He also worked with Paolo Virzì for his first two films.

In 2012 Carnera was nominated to David di Donatello for best cinematography and to Nastro d'Argento in the same category for the crime-drama film ACAB – All Cops Are Bastards.

2020's Bad Tales won Carnera the Nastro d'Argento for Best Cinematography.

Carnera worked as the Director of Photography for Ramin Bahrani's 2021 adaptation of The White Tiger describing that he sought out the pastel pink, blues and greens “colours you can find anywhere in India, especially on neon-lit shops.”

In 2026, Carnera won the David di Donatello for Best Cinematography for Gabriele Mainetti's Forbidden City.

== Selected filmography ==
- Towards Evening (1990)
- The Great Pumpkin (1993)
- Living It Up (1994)
- August Vacation (1996)
- The Grey Zone (1997)
- At the Right Moment (2000)
- Soul Mate (2002)
- Ginger and Cinnamon (2002)
- The Miracle (2003)
- Love Returns (2004)
- A Children's Story (2004)
- The Brave Men (2008)
- Christine Cristina (2009)
- Benvenuti al Sud (2010)
- One Day More (2011)
- ACAB - All Cops Are Bastards (2012)
- Benvenuti al Nord (2012)
- Suburra (2015)
- Boys Cry (2018)
- Bad Tales (2020)
- The White Tiger (2021)
- America Latina (2021)
- Leonora addio (2022)
- Nostalgia (2022)
- Io capitano (2023)
- Adagio (2023)
- Forbidden City (2025)
- Fuori (2025)
- Trick (2026)
