= The Vice of Hope =

2018 film

- Theatrical release poster
- Directed by: Edoardo De Angelis
- Written by: Edoardo De Angelis
- Starring: Pina Turco
- Distributed by: Medusa Film
- Release dates: 6 September 2018 (TIFF); 22 November 2018 (Italy)
- Country: Italy
- Language: Italian

The Vice of Hope (Italian: Il vizio della speranza) is a 2018 Italian drama film directed by Edoardo De Angelis. It was screened in the Contemporary World Cinema section at the 2018 Toronto International Film Festival.

== Cast ==
- Pina Turco as Maria
- Nancy Colarusso as Virgin
- Massimiliano Rossi as Pengue
