= America Latina (film) =

2021 Italian drama film

- Film poster
- Directed by: Damiano D'Innocenzo; Fabio D'Innocenzo
- Written by: Damiano D'Innocenzo; Fabio D'Innocenzo
- Produced by: Lorenzo Mieli
- Starring: Elio Germano
- Cinematography: Paolo Carnera
- Edited by: Walter Fasano
- Music by: Verdena
- Release date: 9 September 2021 (Venice)
- Country: Italy
- Language: Italian

America Latina is a 2021 Italian thriller film directed by Damiano and Fabio D'Innocenzo. It was selected to compete for the Golden Lion at the 78th Venice International Film Festival.

== Cast ==
- Elio Germano as Massimo Sisti
- Astrid Casali as Alessandra Sisti
- Sara Ciocca as Lucia
- Maurizio Lastrico as Simone
- Carlotta Gamba as Laura Sisti
- Federica Pala as Ilenia Sisti
- Filippo Dini as Roberto
- Massimo Wertmüller as Massimo's father
