= Bad Tales =

2020 film

- Theatrical release poster
- Directed by: Damiano D'Innocenzo; Fabio D'Innocenzo
- Screenplay by: Damiano D'Innocenzo; Fabio D'Innocenzo
- Story by: Damiano D'Innocenzo; Fabio D'Innocenzo
- Produced by: Agostino Saccà; Giuseppe Saccà
- Starring: Elio Germano; Barbara Chichiarelli; Gabriel Montesi; Max Malatesta; Ileana D'Ambra; Lino Musella
- Narrated by: Max Tortora
- Cinematography: Paolo Carnera
- Edited by: Esmeralda Calabria
- Production companies: https://en.m.wikipedia.org/wiki/Bad_Tales#/editor/0 Pepito Produzioni; Rai Cinema; Vision Distribution; Amka Films; Radiotelevisione svizzera
- Distributed by: Vision Distribution
- Release dates: 25 February 2020 (Berlin); 26 April 2020 (Italy)
- Running time: 98 minutes
- Countries: Italy; Switzerland
- Language: Italian

Bad Tales (Italian: Favolacce) is a 2020 Italian-Swiss thriller film written and directed by Damiano and Fabio D'Innocenzo. It was selected to compete for the Golden Bear in the main competition section at the 70th Berlin International Film Festival, where the D'Innocenzo brothers were awarded with the Silver Bear for Best Screenplay.

== Plot ==
Prologue of a narrator who talks about a diary found in the garbage, therefore "a true story, which is not true, or maybe yes".

In the suburbs of Rome, some families live an apparently normal and monotonous life, among terraced houses with gardens. In reality they are dissatisfied, envious, greedy and grotesque people.

Vilma is a girl who is expecting a child with her boyfriend, who lives in hardship and deprivation, without particular ambitions or genuine affection.

The spouses Rosa, an emotionally dry couple, raise their daughter with little love. They do not cultivate true friendships, even though they frequent the Placido family, whom they envy for their children's scholastic success and despise as belonging to the "lower social class".

Bruno Placido is the father of two extremely cultured and educated children, who in reality are not happy at all and suffer the now impassive, now angry and violent behavior of adults. Eldest son Denis builds a homemade bomb to kill his parents who, even if they find out, remain unmoved. Ada, daughter of other neighbors, offers him an intimate meeting, inspired by the videos she sees on her father's cell phone, a proposal that doesn't ensnare him and in the end he gives up.

Amelio lives in a prefab with his shy son Geremia. Childlike and crude, he tries to model his son in his image and likeness of himself. Worried about the episode of the bombs (Geremia was also building one), he decides to leave his job and move to the city, to a popular building where his cousin lives.

The boys' teacher is fired for having provided the rudiments for building bombs so that, before leaving the institute, he induces his students to prepare poison, to be taken at a certain time, in a singular collective suicide rite.

At this point the narrator apologizes for having decided to tell such a sad story and for not wanting to continue a new diary written in his own hand.

Epilogue with Amelio, whose son is the only survivor, who learns from a chronicle of the murder-suicide of Vilma and her boyfriend in Spinaceto, after having drowned their newborn daughter, probably under the influence of drugs: the same opening news.

== Cast ==
- Elio Germano as Bruno Placido
- Barbara Chichiarelli as Dalila Placido
- Gabriel Montesi as Amelio Guerrini
- Max Malatesta as Pietro Rosa
- Ileana D'Ambra as Vilma Tommasi
- Lino Musella as Professor Bernardini
- Giulia Melilio as Viola Rosa
- Justin Korovkin as Geremia Guerrini
- Tommaso Di Cola as Dennis Placido
- Barbara Ronchi
- Giulietta Rebeggiani as Alessia Placido
- Max Tortora as Narrator (voice)

== Reception ==
=== Critical response ===
Bad Tales has an approval rating of 47% on review aggregator website Rotten Tomatoes, based on 19 reviews, and an average rating of 6.6/10. Metacritic assigned the film a weighted average score of 60 out of 100, based on 9 critics, indicating "mixed or average reviews".

=== Accolades ===
Bad Tales won the Jury Prize in International Competition at the 2020 Brussels International Film Festival (BRIFF), ex aequo with Rocks.
