= Capri-Revolution =

2018 film

- Film poster
- Directed by: Mario Martone
- Written by: Mario Martone; Ippolita Di Majo
- Produced by: Francesca Cima; Nicola Giuliano
- Starring: Marianna Fontana
- Cinematography: Michele D'Attanasio
- Edited by: Natalie Cristiani; Jacopo Quadri
- Music by: Apparat; Philipp Thimm
- Production companies: Indigo Film; Pathé; Rai Cinema
- Distributed by: 01 Distribution
- Release dates: 6 September 2018 (Venice); 20 December 2018 (Italy)
- Running time: 122 minutes
- Countries: Italy; France
- Language: Italian

Capri-Revolution is a 2018 Italian-French period drama film co-written and directed by Mario Martone. It was selected to be screened in the main competition section of the 75th Venice International Film Festival.

== Plot ==
In 1914, with Italy about to enter World War I, a commune of young artists from Northern Europe establishes itself on the rural island of Capri, a safe haven for dissidents and nonconformists from all over the world, like Russian exiles led by Maxim Gorky, preparing to an upcoming revolution. Here, local girl Lucia meets Seybu, the charming leader of the commune, and Carlo, a young doctor.

== Cast ==
- Marianna Fontana as Lucia
- Reinout Scholten van Aschat as Seybu
- Antonio Folletto as Carlo
- Jenna Thiam as Lilian
- Lola Klamroth as Nina
- Ludovico Girardello as Luca
- Maximilian Dirr as Herbert
- Gianluca Di Gennaro as Antonio
- Donatella Finocchiaro as Maria
- Eduardo Scarpetta as Vincenzo
- Rinat Khismatouline as Maxim Gorky
- Agnieszka Jania as Carmela

== Production ==
Martone took the inspiration for the story from the life of German artist Karl Wilhelm Diefenbach.

Principal photography began on 24 August 2017 in San Mauro Cilento, Italy. Filming took place also in Capri, Gaeta and Cilento. The film was shot under the working title of Capri-Batterie, inspired by a 1985 concept art work of the same name by Joseph Beuys.

== Release ==
Capri-Revolution premiered in competition at the 75th Venice International Film Festival on 6 September 2018. It was released in Italy by 01 Distribution on 20 December 2018.
