= Boys Cry =

2018 film

- Film poster
- Directed by: Damiano D'Innocenzo; Fabio D'Innocenzo
- Written by: Damiano D'Innocenzo; Fabio D'Innocenzo
- Starring: Andrea Carpenzano; Matteo Olivetti; Milena Mancini; Max Tortora; Giordano De Plano; Michela De Rossi; Walter Toschi; Luca Zingaretti
- Cinematography: Paolo Carnera
- Edited by: Marco Spoletini
- Music by: Toni Bruna
- Release dates: 17 February 2018 (Berlin); 7 June 2018 (Italy)
- Running time: 96 minutes
- Country: Italy
- Language: Italian

Boys Cry (Italian: La terra dell'abbastanza) is a 2018 Italian drama film directed by Damiano and Fabio D'Innocenzo. It was screened in the Panorama section at the 68th Berlin International Film Festival.

== Plot ==
Mirko and Manolo have been friends since primary school. They live in a suburb of Rome where they attend hotel school, hoping to finish as soon as possible and become bartenders.

One night in the car, they run over a man and flee without helping him. After the initial feelings of guilt, the two friends discover that this tragic event can be an opportunity for both of them. The man they have killed, as revealed by Danilo, Manolo's father, was a pentito of the Pantanos clan, a minor criminal family of the area, and Mirko and Manolo earn the right to enter the clan, obtaining respect and money that they never had.

Under the guidance of clan leader Angelo, the two friends start working for the clan as hitmen, killing some of Angelo's debtors, without reflecting too much on their actions.

Newfound power and money notwithstanding, Mirko struggles with his conscience. He separates from his girlfriend Ambra and argues with his mother Alessia. After a while, Angelo instructs Manolo and Mirko to kill an ex-boxer who took refuge near Rieti. Manolo seems to kill the boxer without problems, but later kills himself.

A shocked Mirko decides after long consideration to go to the police and confess, but before entering the police barracks is shot dead by a gun from a car speeding past.

== Cast ==
- Matteo Olivetti as Mirko
- Andrea Carpenzano as Manolo
- Milena Mancini as Alessia, Mirko's mother
- Max Tortora as Danilo, Manolo's father
- Michela De Rossi as Ambra, Mirko's girlfriend
- Luca Zingaretti as Angelo

== Reception ==
Boys Cry has an approval rating of 80% on review aggregator website Rotten Tomatoes, based on 5 reviews, and an average rating of 8/10.
