= Damiano and Fabio D'Innocenzo =

Italian film directors and screenwriters

The D'Innocenzo brothers
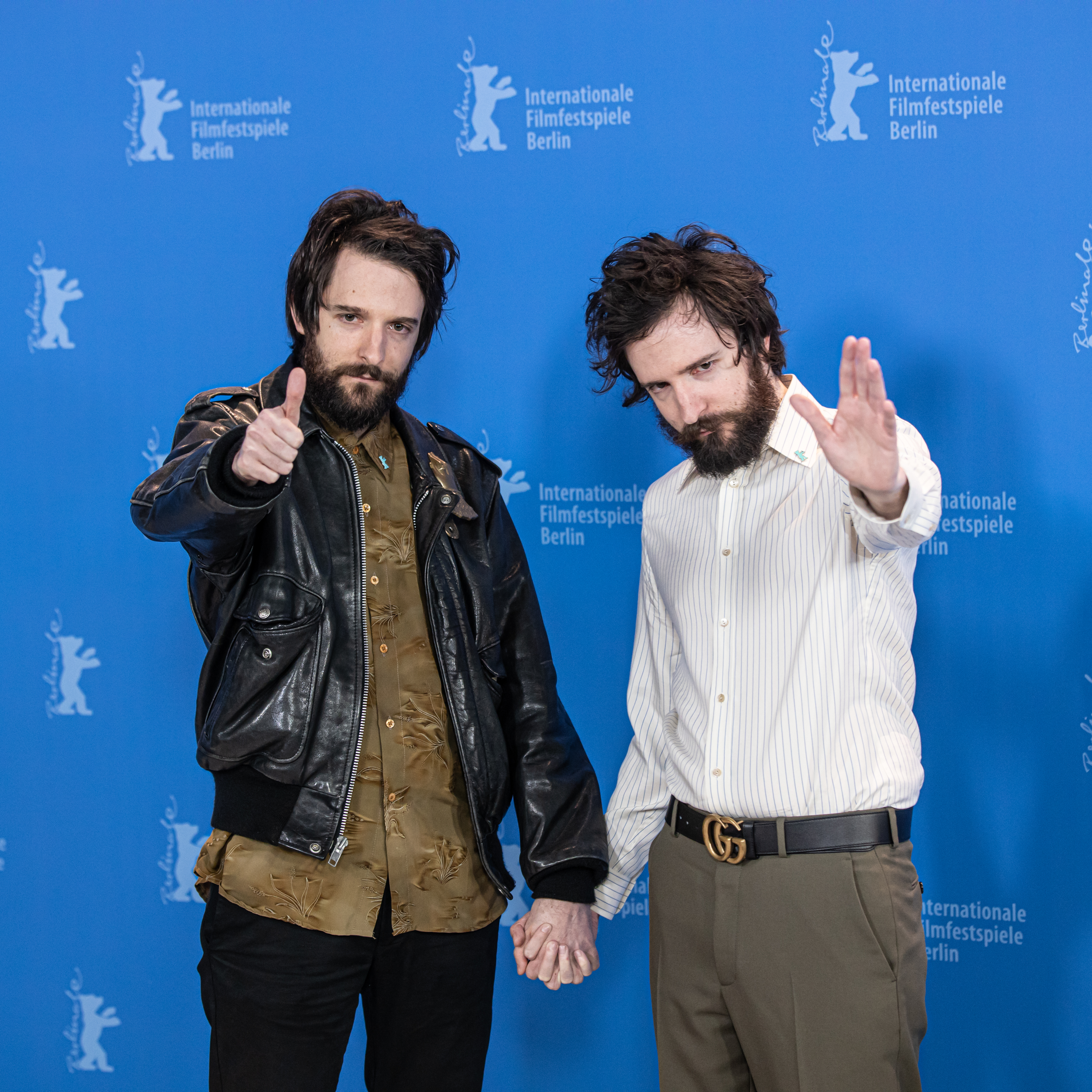
- Damiano (left) and Fabio D'Innocenzo (right), at the 2020 Berlin Film Festival
- Occupations: Film directors, screenwriters

Damiano D'Innocenzo
- Born: 14 July 1988 (age 38); Rome, Italy
- Years active: 2012–present

Fabio D'Innocenzo
- Born: 14 July 1988 (age 38); Rome, Italy
- Years active: 2012–present

Damiano and Fabio D'Innocenzo (born 14 July 1988), collectively referred to as the D'Innocenzo brothers, are Italian film directors and screenwriters who collaborated in productions of note.

== Biography ==
Twin brothers Damiano and Fabio D'Innocenzo grew with a great passion for painting, photography and poetry and, without any cinematographic training, they began to take their first steps in the world of cinema making video clips, writing scripts and setting up theatrical works.

In 2018, they made their first feature film Boys Cry (La terra dell'abbastanza), which was screened in the "Panorama" section of the 68th Berlin International Film Festival, arousing the interest of critics and audiences: the film obtained numerous national and international awards, including the Nastro d'Argento for Best New Director.

Their second film as directors, Bad Tales (Favolacce), was selected in competition at the 70th Berlin International Film Festival and earned to the twins the Silver Bear for Best Screenplay.

== Partial filmography ==
=== Directors ===
- Boys Cry (2018)
- Bad Tales (2020)
- America Latina (2021)
- Dostoevkij (2024)

=== Screenwriters ===
- Dogman (2018)
- Boys Cry (2018)
- Bad Tales (2020)
- America Latina (2021)
- The Girl Flew (2021)
- The City of the Living (2026)
