= Dogman (2018 film) =

Italian-French thriller film

- Italian theatrical release poster
- Directed by: Matteo Garrone
- Screenplay by: Ugo Chiti; Matteo Garrone; Massimo Gaudioso
- Story by: Ugo Chiti; Damiano D'Innocenzo; Fabio D'Innocenzo; Matteo Garrone; Massimo Gaudioso; Marco Perfetti; Giulio Troli
- Produced by: Matteo Garrone; Jeremy Thomas; Jean Labadie; Paolo Del Brocco
- Starring: Marcello Fonte; Edoardo Pesce
- Cinematography: Nicolaj Brüel
- Edited by: Marco Spoletini
- Music by: Michele Braga
- Production companies: Archimede; Le Pacte
- Distributed by: 01 Distribution (Italy); Le Pacte (France)
- Release dates: 16 May 2018 (Cannes); 17 May 2018 (Italy); 11 July 2018 (France)
- Running time: 102 minutes
- Countries: Italy; France
- Language: Italian

Dogman is a 2018 drama-noir thriller inspired by real events involving Er Canaro, and directed by Matteo Garrone. It was selected to compete for the Palme d'Or at the 2018 Cannes Film Festival. At Cannes, Marcello Fonte won the award for Best Actor. Although selected as the Italian entry for the Best Foreign Language Film at the 91st Academy Awards, it was not nominated.

== Plot ==
Marcello is a small, mild man, living in a dilapidated beach settlement in Castel Volturno; he owns a dog grooming shop, and divides his days between his work, his daughter, Alida - who lives with her mother, from whom he is separated - and socialising with other locals. He supplements his meager income by selling cocaine to acquaintances. One is Simone, a huge and thuggish former boxer who terrorises the neighborhood. The extent of this abusive friendship is demonstrated when one night, Simone forces Marcello to take part a burglary, since he has a van and can act as the driver. The job runs smoothly, but Marcello hears his accomplice describe how he put a Chihuahua in the freezer to make it stop barking. After receiving his token share of the loot, Marcello returns to the scene, retrieves the dog, and revives it.

Simone continues to cause havoc, punching a restaurateur and breaking his nose. Some locals discuss what can be done about him, but no decision is made. Marcello is silent throughout. Later that night, Simone forces Marcello to get cocaine for him from his supplier without paying for it. Accompanying him, Simone is turned down due to his debts. The thug responds by brutally beating the dealer and one of his henchmen, leaving with a haul of coke that he and Marcello consume in a strip club. On leaving, Simone is shot by a man on a motorbike. After refusing to go to hospital, Marcello takes Simone to Simone's mother's house to tend to him. Here, Simone and his mother have a brief argument over the cocaine; his mother is upset by his addiction.

One day, Simone discovers that Marcello's shop shares a hollow wall with a cash-for-gold shop, and decides to rob it. Marcello tries to dissuade him, as the owner is his friend, but Simone bullies Marcello into giving him the key to his own shop. Next morning, Marcello discovers that Simone carried out the robbery, leaving a gaping hole in the wall, incriminating him. Marcello is arrested. During the questioning, a police officer makes it clear that they know Simone was responsible and tries to convince Marcello to rat, but he refuses and is imprisoned.

One year later, Marcello returns home a pariah, rejected even by his cocaine supplier, and having to rebuild his business from scratch. Desperate for money, he tracks down Simone and asks for his share of the robbery (around 10,000 euros), but can see it was spent on a motorbike. Simone only gives him 300 euros. Hardened by prison, Marcello retaliates by smashing up the bike. The next day, the bully beats him up in public. After this, Marcello plots his revenge.

After a few days, Marcello seeks Simone out again, apologising for the bike and proposing they rob some cocaine suppliers that are meeting at his shop, to which Simone agrees. When Simone arrives, Marcello tells him to hide in one of the dog cages and wait for his signal. Simone reluctantly does so, only to be locked in it by Marcello, who now taunts the bully. Simone manages to kick the door open, and sticks his head out, whereupon Marcello brains him with a metal bar. Marcello chains Simone to the wall, duct taping his ankles and cable tying hands together, and treats his injury, but Simone traps Marcello's head under his arms and begins to strangle him. In trying to free himself, Marcello kills Simone by causing the grooming table upon which he's sitting to lower, strangling him with the chain.

Shocked, Marcello tries to dispose of the body by setting it on fire in a field. Hearing his former friends playing football (in what is likely a hallucination), he tries to capture their attention by shouting to them that the bully is finally dead, to no avail. He then takes the corpse back to the football field, only to discover that his friends have left. Marcello eventually decides to bring the corpse to a playground at the main square, waiting for people to notice.

== Cast ==
- Marcello Fonte as Marcello
- Edoardo Pesce as Simone ("Simoncino")
- Alida Baldari Calabria as Alida
- Nunzia Schiano as Simoncino's mother
- Adamo Dionisi as Franco
- Francesco Acquaroli as Francesco

== Reception ==
On review aggregator Rotten Tomatoes, the film holds an approval rating of 84% based on 121 reviews, with an average rating of 7.6/10. The website's critical consensus reads, "Dogman offers a grim character study set apart by Marcello Fonte's performance and director Matteo Garrone's tight grip on the material." On Metacritic, the film has a weighted average of score of 71 out of 100, based on 29 critics, indicating "generally favorable reviews".

== See also ==
- Er Canaro
- List of submissions to the 91st Academy Awards for Best Foreign Language Film
- List of Italian submissions for the Academy Award for Best Foreign Language Film
