= David Bellini =

Italian screenwriter

- Born: 7 November 1972; Grosseto, Italy
- Died: 20 October 2016 (aged 43); Spain
- Occupations: screenwriter, television writer and director
- Spouse: Olga Bernal Sancho

David Bellini (7 November 1972 – 20 October 2016) was an Italian screenwriter, television writer, story editor and docu-director. Screenwriter of the famous TV series Un medico in famiglia, head writer of the Italian programs: Tetris and Festa italiana, creator and director of a number of docu-series such as Passaggi Segreti and Tra cielo e terra.

== Biography and Education ==
Bellini was born in Grosseto, Maremma (Tuscany) in 1972. Son of a skilled worker and a hairdresser. He graduated in Political Science in the University of Siena. During his studies in Siena, he also founded the Cultural Association Articolo 21, wrote often for some local newspapers (Il Tirreno, La Gazzetta di Siena) and attended a creative writing course by Vincenzo Cerami in the town of Lucca. He was also pupil of Furio Scarpelli and years later he participated in a course for screenwriters organized by Dino Audino and Rai Fiction held by some of the best Italian and American screenwriting coaches: John Truby, Dara Marks, Francesco Scardamaglia, Gino Ventriglia and Linda Seger. He died on October 20, 2016, from cancer.

== Career ==
His first opportunity arrived very soon. In 1998 Thunderfilm hired him to write his first screenplay San Donnino San Pechino along with the comedian Andrea Muzzi and another scriptwriter Massimo Sgorbani. Two years later, he conducted the comic strip Attacchi di panico again with Muzzi and Sgorbani and received three nominations to the Merano Tv Festival 2000.

The same year (2000) David Bellini moved to Rome to work as a content editor for Geca Italia, a company owned by Geca España, Publispei and Endemol Italia. Soon he would become head writer assistant for Paola Pascolini to work in one of the most successful TV series in Italy Un medico in famiglia season 3 and then as a screenwriter for the last two episodes of season 3 of the series. This experience made his breakthrough in the entertainment world. In the following years, David Bellini worked relentlessly as a screenwriter as well as a documentary film maker.

He wrote episodes for Un medico in famiglia season 4, Un medico in famiglia season 5, Un medico in famiglia season 6, I Cesaroni, Sottocasa and directed docu-series and documentaries such as Rudy. Il Mito Rodolfo Valentino, Passaggi Segreti and In Crociera!. With Passaggi Segreti he won the Marcopolo award 2004.

His curiosity, grew soon in him an interest also for TV formats therefore in 2005 he started working for unscripted programs. Signed a contract with Rai 1 for the first and second seasons of the afternoon talk-show Festa Italiana and also for the evening specials Notte d'amore and Se rinasco… canto with Rai 2.

In September 2007, David Bellini was chosen as the new head writer of Tetris, Italian talk-show about Italian politics, produced by Wilder company which airs on the TV channel La7. Responsible for two seasons that obtained exceptional audience. Then he decided to go back to work with docu-series, documentaries, comedies and dramedies. In 2009 he created L'isola del gusto, a kitchen comedy for the cable TV channel Alice. With Favole in verde conducted a delightful series of 30 episodes about the most evocative private gardens in Italy for the channel Leonardo on Sky TV in which among the personality guests, the great screenwriter Tonino Guerra and the painter Antonio Saliola.

With Tra cielo e terra (2010), series of 16 episodes of half an hour for the channel Marcopolo told as an executive producer and director the darkest and most intriguing stories about some of the most fascinating monasteries in Europe. In the same year he wrote four episodes of the series Un medico in famiglia 7.

In November 2010 he wrote and directed the third season of the series Sussurri e grida (four documentaries that tell the story of Ludwig II of Bavaria), produced by Sitcom Televisioni and aired on Marcopolo channel. Shortly after Bellini participated at the creation of the pilot Perfetti innamorati, talent-show of romance, broadcast on Rai 1 on 18 January 2011 and produced by Marco Tombolini and Pasquale Romano from Toro Produzioni.

On 11 May 2012 the SACT, which was one of the most important Italian writers' associations, appointed Bellini as the SACT representative in Los Angeles. Bellini approached the executives of the Writers Guild of America, West (WGAW) and started a fruitful cooperation with them. On 22 July 2013 the majority of the SACT members voted for the foundation of the Writers Guild Italia (WGI). From then on, Bellini is the WGI Spokesman in LA.

Since January 2014, teaches Italian-style screenwriting at the Italian Cultural Institute of Los Angeles. In April 2014, joins the select Committee of L.A. which votes for the prestigious Strega Prize.

He's repped by Grace Talent Agency on the U.S. market whereas it's Diberti & C. to take care of his projects in Italy.

== Television ==
=== Screenwriter ===
- A Classic Horror Story (2021)
- Un medico in famiglia 7 (Rai 1, 2011, 4 episodes)
- Un medico in famiglia 6 (Rai 1, 2009, 4 episodes)
- Famiglia Benincasa (Rai 1, 2009, 12 episodes)
- L'isola del gusto (Alice, 2009, 25 episodes)
- Un medico in famiglia 5 (Rai 1, 2007, 4 episodes)
- I Cesaroni (Canale 5, 2006, 1 episode)
- Rudy. Il mito Rodolfo Valentino (History Channel, 2006)
- Sottocasa (Rai 1, 2006, 1 episode)
- Un medico in famiglia 4 (Rai 1, 2004, 6 episodes)
- Interno 4 (Pilot, 2004)
- Un medico in famiglia 3 (Rai 1, 2001, 2 episodes)
- Back Door (Pilot, 2000)
- Attacchi di panico (Pilot, 2000)

=== Head writer assistant ===
- Un medico in famiglia 3 (Rai 1, 2001, 24 episodes)

=== Television writer ===
- Sussurri e grida (Marcopolo, 2011, 4 episodes)
- I Perfetti Innamorati (Rai 1, 2011)
- Tra cielo e terra (Marcopolo, 2010–2011, 16 episodes)
- Favole in verde (Leonardo, 2009–2010, 17 episodes)
- Tetris (La7, 2007–2008, 18 episodes)
- Festa Italiana (Rai 1, 2005–2007, 370 episodes)
- Se rinasco… canto (Rai 2, 2005)
- Notte d'amore (Rai 2, 2005)
- In Crociera! (Marcopolo, Leonardo World, 2004, 24 episodes)
- Passaggi segreti (Marcopolo, Leonardo World, SKY 109, 2003, 12 episodes)

=== Director ===
- Sussurri e grida (Marcopolo, 2011, 4 episodes)
- Tra cielo e terra (Marcopolo, 2010–2011, 16 episodes)
- Favole in verde (Leonardo, 2009–2010, 17 episodes)
- Interno 4 (Pilot, 2004)
- In Crociera! (Marcopolo, Leonardo World, 2004, 24 episodes)
- Passaggi segreti (Marcopolo, Leonardo World, SKY 109, 2003, 12 episodes)

== Other activities ==
=== Teacher ===
He taught screenwriting and creative writing techniques held at universities, associations and schools to students and professional writers.

He gave lectures in courses for screenwriters organized by Script and Rai Fiction, taught aspiring television writers at Sacro Cuore Catholic University of Brescia, as well as his seminar about adaptation, subject included in the course for editors organized by the publishing house Segnalibro.
