= The Spiral (film) =

2026 thriller film by Paolo Strippoli

- Italian theatrical release poster
- Italian: L'estranea
- Directed by: Paolo Strippoli
- Screenplay by: Paolo Strippoli; Salvatore De Chirico
- Produced by: Marina Marzotto; Mattia Oddone
- Starring: Jasmine Trinca; Romana Maggiora Vergano; Adriano Giannini; Valeria Bruni Tedeschi
- Cinematography: Cristiano Di Nicola
- Edited by: Federico Palmerini
- Music by: Robin Coudert
- Production companies: Propaganda; Rai Cinema; Dinamo Film
- Distributed by: 01 Distribution; Le Pacte
- Release dates: 7 September 2026 (Venice); 8 October 2026 (Italy)
- Running time: 115 minutes
- Countries: Italy; France; Belgium
- Language: Italian

The Spiral (Italian: L'estranea, lit. 'The Stranger') is a 2026 thriller film co-written and directed by Paolo Strippoli. A co-production of Italy, France, and Belgium, it stars Jasmine Trinca, Romana Maggiora Vergano, Adriano Giannini, and Valeria Bruni Tedeschi.

The film had its world premiere in the main competition of the 83rd Venice International Film Festival on 7 September 2026, where it competed for the Golden Lion. It was theatrically released in Italy on 8 October 2026.

It received positive reviews from critics and was also selected as the Italian entry for Best International Feature Film at the 99th Academy Awards.

== Cast ==
- Jasmine Trinca as Anna
- Romana Maggiora Vergano as Alice
  - Gabriella Telegrafo as young Alice
- Adriano Giannini as Walter
- Valeria Bruni Tedeschi as The Stranger
- Andrea Genovese as Tobia
  - Alessandro Carbonara as young Tobia

== Production ==
Principal photography began on 3 June 2025. Filming took place in Rome and Apulia, with specific filming locations in the latter including Bari, Gioia del Colle, and Monopoli. The film was shot over seven weeks, with production wrapping on 25 July 2025.

== Release ==
Director Paolo Strippoli and the cast of the film at the 83rd Venice International Film Festival

The film had its world premiere in the main competition of the 83rd Venice International Film Festival on 7 September 2026, where it competed for the Golden Lion.

Le Pacte owns the international sales rights to the film. It was theatrically released in Italy by 01 Distribution on 8 October 2026. In November 2026, New Line Cinema acquired distribution rights to the film in the United States, Canada, Hong Kong, Indonesia, Malaysia, the Philippines, Taiwan, Thailand, and Vietnam, planning to give it a limited theatrical release later that year. Additionally, the company bought English-language remake rights to the film.

== Reception ==
=== Critical response ===
On the review aggregator website Rotten Tomatoes, 75% of 16 critics' reviews are positive, with an average rating of 7.8/10. Metacritic, which uses a weighted average, assigned the film a score of 75 out of 100, based on 9 critics, indicating "generally favorable reviews".

Guy Lodge of Variety described the film as "a faintly absurd Faustian fable blown up to grand guignol proportions", and, although he considered it less original than Strippoli's previous work,The Holy Boy (2025), he saw it as further establishing the director as "Italy's new horror virtuoso". Peter Bradshaw of The Guardian gave the film a four-star rating, calling it an "uproarious edge-of-the-seat gripper", and hailing Bruni Tedeschi's performance as the best of her career. Deadline's Damon Wise also praised the film, characterizing it as a "more grounded mix of Paolo Sorrentino's The Great Beauty and W. W. Jacobs' short horror story The Monkey's Paw," and lauding its "quite fantastically inventive" ideas and Bruni Tedeschi's and Trinca's performances.

Max Borg of The Film Verdict wrote that "what The Spiral may lack in meticulous build-up it makes up for in successive pay-offs". He also called the film "propulsive and exhilarating, a ray of sunshine despite the gloomy clouds that bookend the framing device." In a less positive review, Screen Daily's Lee Marshall referred to the film as "a self-consciously stylish number stuffed full of flashy crane shots, extreme shallow focus and woozy wide-angle shots" which "promises more than it delivers".

=== Accolades ===
Award	Date of ceremony	Category	Recipient(s)	Result	Ref.
Venice Film Festival	12 September 2026	Golden Lion	The Spiral	Nominated	
Toronto International Film Festival	20 September 2026	People's Choice Award: Midnight Madness	The Spiral	Runner-up	

== See also ==
- List of submissions to the 99th Academy Awards for Best International Feature Film
- List of Italian submissions for the Academy Award for Best International Feature Film
