= Ginevra Francesconi =

Italian actress and model (born 2003)

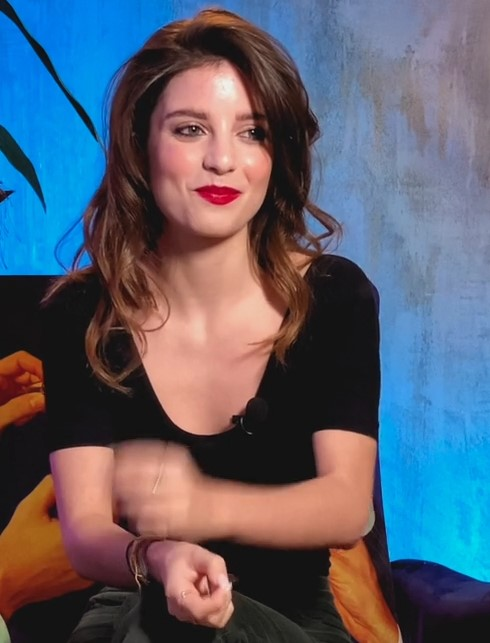
- Francesconi in 2024
- Born: 22 April 2003 (age 23); Sora, Lazio, Italy
- Occupations: Actress; model
- Height: 1.61 m (5 ft 3.39 in)
- Relatives: Ludovica Francesconi (sister)

Ginevra Francesconi (born 22 April 2003) is an Italian actress and model.

== Early life ==
Born in 2003 in Sora, in the province of Frosinone, to mother Sonia Lupo and father Fabrizio Francesconi, Ginevra is the younger sister of Ludovica, who is also an actress.

== Career ==
Ginevra Francesconi from 2008 to 2014 participated in high fashion shows in the KIDS category. In 2014 she starred in the short film Non puoi nasconderti directed by Andrea Olindo Bizzarri. In 2017 she made her first appearance on the small screen with the role of Guinevere in an episode of the fourth season of the series Che Dio ci aiuti, entitled Una goccia nel mare. The following year, in 2018, she played the role of Francesca Tancredi in an episode of the eleventh season of Don Matteo, entitled Ancora bambina.

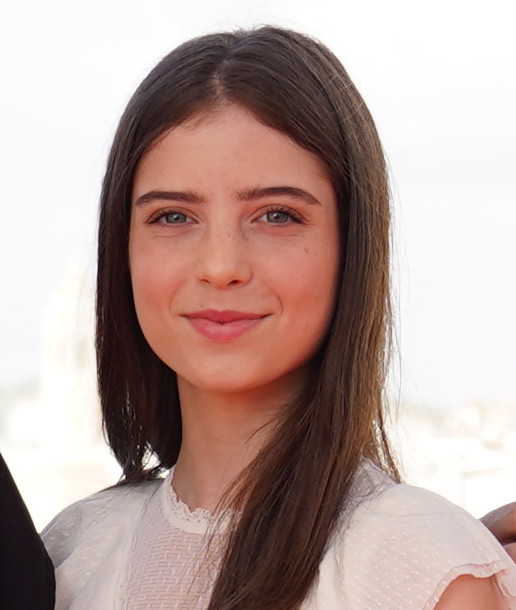
Francesconi at the Sitges Film Festival in 2019

In 2019 she played the role of Denise in the film The Nest directed by Roberto De Feo. In the same year she played the role of Azzurra in the film Famosa directed by Alessandra Mortelliti. In 2019 and 2020 she was chosen to play the role of Gloria in the second and third seasons of the series Sara e Marti. In 2021 she graduated from the "Leonardo Da Vinci" scientific high school in her hometown.

In 2020 she played the role of Regina in the film Regina directed by Alessandro Grande, where she played together with the actor Francesco Montanari. The following year, in 2021, she played the role of Simone in the film Genitori vs influencer directed by Michela Andreozzi, where she starred together with actors Fabio Volo and Giulia De Lellis.

In 2021, in 2023 and 2025 she joined the cast of the series Buongiorno, mamma!, in the role of Sole Borghi, where she played together with the actors Raoul Bova and Maria Chiara Giannetta. In 2022 she starred in the short film Mother directed by Valentina De Amicis. In the same year she played the role of Sofia Romeo in the film My Name Is Vendetta (Il mio nome è vendetta) directed by Cosimo Gomez and where she starred alongside the actor Alessandro Gassman.

In 2023, she played the role of Camilla in the short film A voce nuda, directed by Mattia Lobosco, which premiered in September of that year at the 80th Venice International Film Festival. That same year, she landed the role of Alice Santamaria in the miniseries Un'estate fa, alongside actors Lino Guanciale, Claudia Pandolfi and Filippo Scotti. In 2024, she played Aria in the film Un oggi alla volta, directed by Nicola Conversa, alongside actor Tommaso Cassissa. In 2025, she played the role of Sofia in the film Una figlia, directed by Ivano De Matteo, alongside actors Stefano Accorsi and Michela Cescon, and starred in the series Tutta scena. In September of the same year, after attending the 82nd Venice International Film Festival, she was awarded the Kinéo Award for Best Actress in a Leading Role for the film Una figlia. In October, the film Squali, directed by Daniele Barbieri, in which she played the role of Anna and based on the novel of the same name by Giacomo Mazzariol, was released in theaters.

== Personal life ==
Since 2023 she has been in a relationship with comedian, actor and YouTuber Tommaso Cassissa, whom she met on the set of the film Un oggi alla volta.

== Filmography ==
=== Film ===
Year	Title	Role	Notes
2014	Non puoi nasconderti	Alice	Short film
2016	Mother		Short film
2019	The Nest	Denise	
2019	Famosa	Azzurra	
2020	Regina	Regina	
2021	Genitori vs influencer	Simone	
2022	My Name Is Vendetta	Sofia Romeo	
2023	A voce nuda	Camilla	Short film
2024	Un oggi alla volta	Aria	
2025	Una figlia	Sofia	
2025	Squali	Anna	

=== TV series ===
Year	Title	Role	Notes
2017	Che Dio ci aiuti	Ginevra	TV series, episode "Una goccia nel mare"
2018	Don Matteo	Francesca Tancredi	TV series, episode "Ancora bambina"
2019–2020	Sara e Marti	Gloria	TV series, 40 episodes
2021–2025	Buongiorno, mamma!	Sole Borghi	TV series, 32 episodes
2023	Un'estate fa	Alice Santamaria	TV miniseries, 8 episodes
2025	Tutta scena		TV series

== Theater ==
Year	Title	Role
2012	Un pianoforte e due scarpette	
2013	Pseudolo	Calidoro
2014	Il Servitore di due padroni	Clarice

== Awards ==
Year	Award	Category	Work	Result	Notes
2019	RdC Award	Best New Actress		Won	
2021	Spello Film Festival	Promising Young Cinema		Won	
2021	Nastro d'Argento	Graziella Bonacchi Award	Regina	Won	
2022	Sezze Film Festival	Best leading actress		Won	
2025	Kinéo Award	Best Actress in a Leading Role	Una figlia	Won	
