= Paolo Strippoli =

Italian filmmaker (born 1993)

- Strippoli in 2026
- Born: 4 February 1993 (age 33); Corato, Italy
- Occupation: Filmmaker
- Years active: 2013–present

Paolo Strippoli (born 4 February 1993) is an Italian filmmaker, best known for his works in the horror and thriller genres, such as A Classic Horror Story (2021), Flowing (2022), The Holy Boy (2025), and The Spiral (2026).

== Life and career ==
Born in Corato, Strippoli graduated in performing arts and sciences from Sapienza University of Rome and in film direction from Centro Sperimentale di Cinematografia. He then directed several shorts, and served as assistant director for Gianni Amelio in Tenderness and for Daniele Luchetti in Io sono Tempesta. In 2019, he won the Solinas Prize for best script with L'angelo infelice.

In 2021, Strippoli made his feature debut with A Classic Horror Story, co-written and co-directed with Roberto De Feo. For this film Strippoli and De Feo won the award for best direction at the Taormina Film Fest. In 2022, he directed his first solo feature, the horror film Flowing. His third film, The Holy Boy, premiered out of competition at the 82nd Venice International Film Festival. For this film Strippoli won the Nastro d'Argento for best original story. In 2026, his film The Spiral was selected to compete for the Golden Lion at the 83rd Venice International Film Festival.

== Personal life ==
Paolo Strippoli is openly gay.

== Filmography ==
=== Feature films ===
Year	English title	Original title	Notes
2021	A Classic Horror Story		co-directed with Roberto De Feo
2022	Flowing	Piove	
2025	The Holy Boy	La valle dei sorrisi	
2026	The Spiral	L'estranea	

== Accolades ==
Award	Year	Category	Nominated work	Result	Ref.
Chicago International Film Festival	2025	Q-Hugo Award	The Holy Boy	Nominated	
Ciak d'oro	2021	Best First Feature	A Classic Horror Story	Nominated	
Fantastic Fest	2025	Best Director - Next Wave	The Holy Boy	Won	
Fantastic Fest	2025	Audience Award - Next Wave	The Holy Boy	Won	
Lecce European Film Festival	2025	Centro Nazionale del Cortometraggio Award	Nessun dorma	Won	
Lecce European Film Festival	2025	Premio Augustus Color	Nessun dorma	Won	
Nastri d'argento	2026	Best Screenplay	The Holy Boy	Won	
Venice International Film Festival	2026	Golden Lion	The Spiral	Nominated	
