= Cabrini (film) =

2024 American film by Alejandro Gómez

- Theatrical release poster
- Directed by: Alejandro Monteverde
- Screenplay by: Rod Barr
- Story by: Alejandro Monteverde; Rod Barr
- Produced by: J. Eustace Wolfington; Jonathan Sanger; Leo Severino
- Starring: Cristiana Dell'Anna; David Morse; Romana Maggiora Vergano; Federico Ielapi; Virginia Bocelli; Rolando Villazón; Giancarlo Giannini; John Lithgow
- Cinematography: Gorka Gómez Andreu
- Edited by: F. Brian Scofield
- Music by: Gene Back
- Production companies: Francesca Film Production NY; Lupin Film; Lodigiano Film Development Inc.
- Distributed by: Angel Studios
- Release date: March 8, 2024
- Running time: 142 minutes
- Country: United States
- Languages: English; Italian
- Budget: $50 million
- Box office: $20.6 million

Cabrini is a 2024 American biographical drama film directed by Alejandro Gómez Monteverde and written by Rod Barr, based on a story by both. The film depicts the life of Catholic missionary Francesca Cabrini, portrayed by Cristiana Dell'Anna, as she encounters resistance to her charity and business efforts in New York City. Cabrini explores the sexism and anti-Italian bigotry faced by Cabrini and others in New York City in the late 19th century.

Cabrini was released in the United States on March 8, 2024, by Angel Studios. The film received positive reviews, and grossed $20.6 million worldwide on a $50 million budget.

== Plot ==
In 1889 New York City, Italian immigrant Paolo is unable to obtain medical help for his dying mother because he speaks no English. After her death, he is taken in by Enzo, an older homeless boy living in the sewers.

Mother Frances Xavier Cabrini, a nun suffering from tuberculosis, seeks permission from Pope Leo XIII to establish a missionary order and work in China. The Pope approves the order but sends her instead to New York, where impoverished Italian immigrants urgently need assistance.

Cabrini arrives with several Sisters and begins working in the Five Points neighborhood. Despite resistance from Archbishop Corrigan, who relents only after seeing her papal authorization, the Sisters establish an orphanage and provide food, shelter, and medical care. Cabrini befriends Vittoria, a prostitute who leaves her brothel to join their work, and takes in Paolo and Enzo after they attempt to steal food.

Cabrini's health deteriorates, and Dr. Murphy warns that she may have only two years to live. Nevertheless, she continues expanding the mission. Paolo later shoots Vittoria's abusive former pimp, Geno, but Cabrini persuades him to destroy the gun that had belonged to his father. When Geno subsequently attacks Vittoria, she kills him in self-defense.

After the city evicts the Sisters from an Upper West Side property, Corrigan gives them former Jesuit land outside the city. They establish a children's home there, despite having to dig their own wells. Paolo and Enzo find work to support the mission, but Enzo is killed in an industrial accident. Learning that better medical facilities could have saved many of the victims, Cabrini resolves to build a modern hospital.

She raises support from wealthy immigrant families and asks opera singer Enrico DiSalvo to perform at a benefit. After hearing immigrant children sing Va, pensiero from Verdi's Nabucco, he agrees. The fundraiser is disrupted by police, however, and Cabrini is arrested. Corrigan orders her to return to Italy.

In Italy, Cabrini persuades the Pope to overrule Corrigan and secures funding from the Italian Senate. After the unfinished hospital is destroyed by arson, she confronts New York's hostile mayor and, with the support of a sympathetic New York Times reporter, forces him to withdraw his opposition.

Despite her illness, Cabrini lives to the age of 67 and establishes a worldwide network of charitable institutions, including missions in China. She is later canonized as the first United States citizen to become a saint and is named the patron saint of immigrants.

== Cast ==
- Cristiana Dell'Anna as Francesca Cabrini
- David Morse as Archbishop Corrigan
- Romana Maggiora Vergano as Vittoria
- Federico Ielapi as Paolo
- Virginia Bocelli as Aria
- Rolando Villazón as DiSalvo
- Giancarlo Giannini as Pope Leo XIII
- John Lithgow as Mayor Gould
- Federico Castelluccio as Senator Bodio
- Patch Darragh as Dr. Murphy
- Jeremy Bobb as New York Times reporter Theodore Calloway
- Eugenia Forteza as Sister Umilia

== Production ==
The film was executive produced by J. Eustace Wolfington, a Philadelphia Main Line businessman, entrepreneur and Catholic philanthropist. He also produced the film Bella in 2006. Principal photography began in western New York in mid-2021 with locations in Buffalo and Niagara Falls. Production moved to Rome later that year.

== Release ==
Cabrini was released in the United States by Angel Studios on March 8, 2024. The film was screened privately for the community of Cabrini University at its Alumni Weekend on September 24, 2023. It was released in the United Kingdom on March 15, 2024.

== Reception ==
=== Box office ===
Cabrini has grossed $19.5 million in United States and Canada and $1.1 million in other territories, for a worldwide total of $20.6 million.

In the United States and Canada, Cabrini was released alongside Kung Fu Panda 4 and Imaginary, set for a projected gross of about $8.5 million from 2,840 theaters in its opening weekend. The film made $3.1 million on its first day, including $500,000 from Thursday night preview, ultimately reaching $7.2 million in its first weekend.

=== Critical response ===
On the review aggregator website Rotten Tomatoes, 91% of 90 critics' reviews are positive, with an average rating of 7.2/10. The website's consensus reads: "Aided by Cristiana Dell'Anna's performance in the title role, Cabrini is an uplifting biopic with a timeless message." Metacritic, which uses a weighted average, assigned the film a score of 51 out of 100, based on 14 critics, indicating "mixed or average" reviews. Audiences polled by CinemaScore gave the film an average grade of "A" on an A+ to F scale, while those polled by PostTrak gave it an 94% overall positive score.

RogerEbert.com's Tomris Laffly, rating the film 3 out of 4 stars, praised it as "the kind of middlebrow, big-screen period piece that used to occupy our theater screens regularly just a few decades ago". She concluded "If the name Alejandro Monteverde is familiar to your ears, it's likely because of last year's absurd and highly controversial box office hit Sound of Freedom. Thankfully, Cabrini doesn't arrive with a controversy to its name... [It] is in no way a perfect movie, but a damn dignified one that honors the little-known efforts of these fearless women." Richard Roeper, writing from the Chicago Sun-Times, similarly stated "The biopic Cabrini is a beautiful reminder of the human being behind the name... The Italian actress Cristiana Dell'Anna turns in a stunningly effective, movie-star performance in a film that is reminiscent of old-fashioned religious biopics such as The Song of Bernadette and Joan of Arc."

Conversely, IndieWire's David Ehrlich rated Cabrini a C−, criticizing it as "A stodgy, histrionic, and impossibly dull biopic that drags on for more than 140 minutes despite being thinner than a stained glass window." He went on to say "Its dialogue is a stale mess of empty slogans in search of a character to support them, its cinematography smothers turn of the century New York under a mustard cloud of digital sepia, and its structure — credited to both Monteverde and screenwriter Rod Barr — is so absent a convincing shape that it might as well be a person with three arms or a t‍–‍shirt that only has sleeves." Variety's Carlos Aguilar was also negative, writing "[For] all that can be questioned about the makers' intentions, the movie's greatest sin is how lifelessly solemn and aesthetically dull it is. Equidistant from the shock-value slop of the God's Not Dead franchise and from anything remotely considered interesting filmmaking, Cabrini lies in a middle ground of mediocrity."

=== Awards ===
Cabrini won the Epiphany Prize for Most Inspiring Movie at the 2025 Movieguide Awards. It received a nomination for the Satellite Award for Best Motion Picture – Drama at the 29th Satellite Awards.
