= Cristiana Dell'Anna =

Italian actress (born 1985)

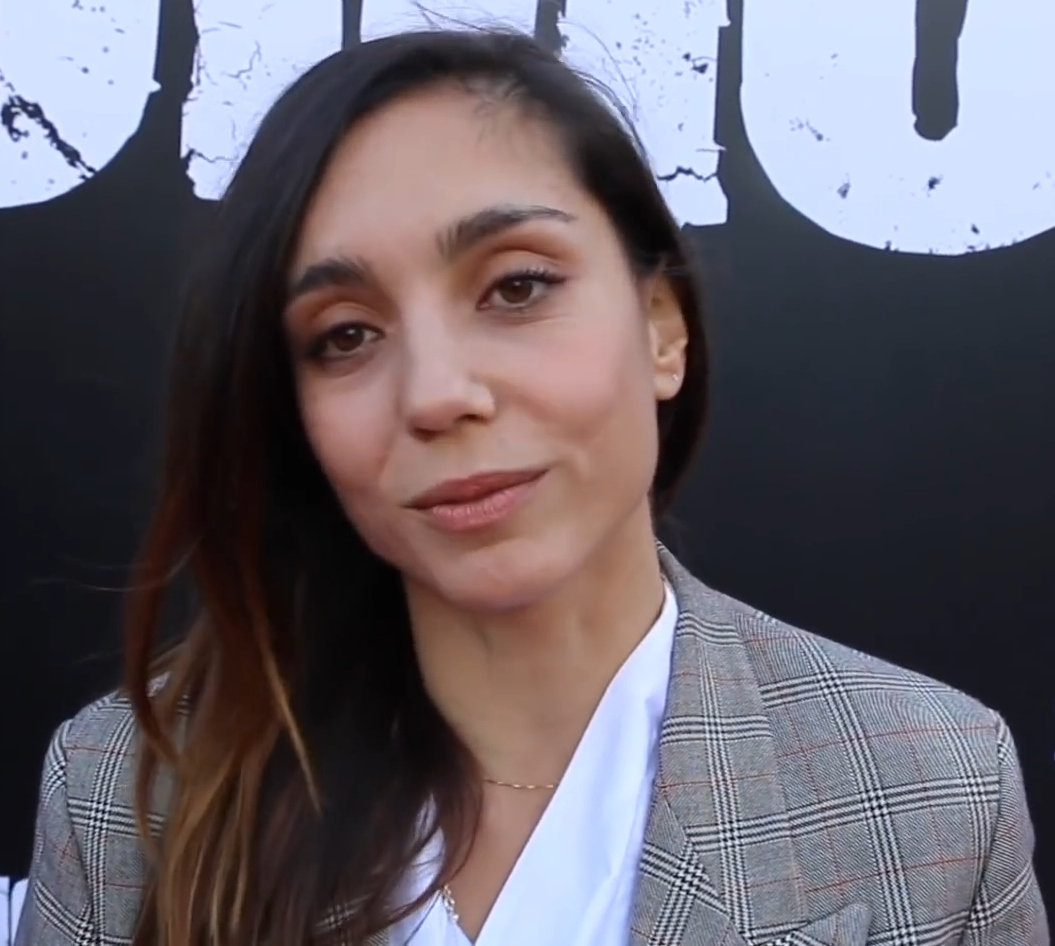
- Born: 24 August 1985 (age 41); Naples, Italy
- Education: Guildhall School of Music and Drama
- Occupation: Actress

Cristiana Dell'Anna (born 24 August 1985) is an Italian actress. She's best known for her portrayal of the twin sisters Manuela and Micaela Cirillo in Rai 3 soap opera Un posto al sole (2012–2016) and for the role of Patrizia Santore in the crime drama series Gomorrah (2016–2019).

== Life and career ==
Born in Naples, the daughter of a doctor and a teacher, Dell'Anna studied at the Drama Studio London and the Guildhall School of Music and Drama.

After some minor roles, Dell'Anna had her breakout in 2012, when she played the twins Micaela e Manuela Cirillo in the Rai 3 soap opera Un posto al sole. In 2015 she landed her best known role, Patrizia Santore in the crime series Gomorrah.

For her performance in Mario Martone's The King of Laughter, she got a David di Donatello nomination for Best Supporting Actress.

She plays the lead role of Mother Cabrini in the 2024 film Cabrini, getting more exposure to English-speaking audiences.

== Filmography ==
=== Film ===
Year	Title	Role	Notes
2013	Third Contact	Teresa	
2017	Mr. Happiness	Caterina	
2019	Tensione superficiale	Michela	
2021	The Hand of God	Armando's Sister	
2021	The King of Laughter	Luisa De Filippo	
2022	Toscana	Sophia	
2022	Flowing	Cristina	
2023	Mixed by Erry	Marisa Frattasio	
2024	Una storia nera	PM Alaimo	
2024	Cabrini	Frances Xavier Cabrini	
2024	Tre regole infallibili	Claudia	
2024	C'è un posto nel mondo	Anna Santi	
2025	The Panic	Belle DeCosta Greene	

=== Television ===
Year	Title	Role	Notes
2012–2016	Un posto al sole	Manuela and Micaela Cirillo	Recurring role (season 16-21)
2013	Un posto al sole coi fiocchi	Manuela and Micaela Cirillo	Television movie
2016–2019	Gomorrah	Patrizia Santore	Main role (season 2-4)
2018	In punta di piedi	Nunzia	Television movie
2018	Trust	Lucia	3 episodes
2024	La coda del diavolo	Fabiana Lai	Television movie
2025–present	My Family	Maria	Main role
2026	A Taste for Murder	Inspector Lara Sarracino	Main role
