= Romana Maggiora Vergano =

Italian actress (born 1997)

- Vergano in 2026
- Born: 27 November 1997 (age 28); Rome, Italy
- Occupation: Actress
- Years active: 2018–present

Romana Maggiora Vergano (born 27 November 1997) is an Italian actress.

== Biography ==
Vergano started acting in 2018 with small roles in Italian television shows, notably in Don Matteo, Il silenzio dell'acqua, Liberi tutti, and Chiamami ancora amore. In 2022, she started playing the role of Michela Greco in Christian, a crime television show on Sky Atlantic.

In 2018, she appeared for the first time in a feature-length film as Michela in L'ultimo piano. In 2020, she was awarded the Vincenzo Crocitti International Prize.

Her first leading role was in the 2022 Italian comedy The Beautiful Years. In 2023, she joined the cast of Paola Cortellesi's directorial debut, There's Still Tomorrow, as Marcella, the protagonist's daughter. She plays Salena in the Peacock/Amazon Prime video series Those About to Die, directed by Roland Emmerich and Marco Kreuzpaintner.

== Filmography ==
=== Film ===
Year	Title	Role(s)	Notes
2018	L'ultimo piano	Michela	
2021	Dog Years	Ludovica	
2022	The Beautiful Years	Elena	
2022	Dry	Association Volunteer	Uncredited
2023	Lisa	Sveva	
2023	There's Still Tomorrow	Marcella Santucci	Nominated – David di Donatello for Best Supporting Actress
2024	Cabrini	Vittoria	
2024	The Time It Takes	Francesca	
2025	The Holy Boy	Michela	
2026	The Spiral	Alice	
2026	Idda	TBA	Post-production

=== Television ===
Year	Title	Role(s)	Notes
2018	The Immature: The Series	Francesca Primavera	Main role
2018	Don Matteo	Guia Fanciullini	Episode: "Scegli me!"
2019	Liberi tutti	Valentina	5 episodes
2021	Chiamami ancora amore	Irene	Episode: "La promessa"
2022–2023	Christian	Michela Greco	Recurring role
2024	La Storia	Patrizia	2 episodes
2024	Those About to Die	Salena	Main role
2026	Prima di noi	Eloisa Sartori	3 episodes
2026	Portobello	Francesca Scopelliti	Main role

== Awards and nominations ==
Year	Award	Category	Work	Result
2024	Francesco Pasinetti Award	Best Actress	The Time It Takes	Won
2024	David di Donatello Award	Best Supporting Actress	C'è ancora domani	Nominated
2025	Nastro d'Argento Award	Best Actress	The Time It Takes	Won
