= Black Souls =

2014 Italian-French crime drama film

- Film poster
- Directed by: Francesco Munzi
- Written by: Francesco Munzi; Gioacchino Criaco
- Starring: Marco Leonardi; Fabrizio Ferracane; Peppino Mazzotta
- Cinematography: Vladan Radovic
- Edited by: Cristiano Travaglioli
- Music by: Giuliano Taviani
- Release dates: 29 August 2014 (Venice); 18 September 2014 (Italy)
- Running time: 103 minutes
- Countries: Italy; France
- Languages: Italian; Calabrese

Black Souls (Italian: Anime nere) is a 2014 Italian-French crime drama film directed by Francesco Munzi. It was nominated for the Golden Lion at the 71st Venice International Film Festival. It was also selected to be screened in the Contemporary World Cinema section at the 2014 Toronto International Film Festival.

== Plot ==
Luigi is a member of the Calabrian 'Ndrangheta and an international drug dealer, linked to powerful South American crime groups. His elder brother Rocco lives in Milan with his wife Valeria and their daughter. He does not approve of his younger brother's lifestyle and is in construction business. Luciano, the eldest of the three brothers, has remained in Calabria tending his goats in the mountains, with the illusory goal of remaining uninvolved with his brothers' illegal businesses.

Leo, the young and rancorous son of Luciano, in response to an insult shoots up the exterior of a bar protected by a rival clan of 'Ndrangheta, who had already been offended by Luigi's refusal to trade with them. Their history goes deep, however; Luigi hates them because their boss killed his father many years before.

The rival clan demands that Luigi supply them with drugs, but this only motivates Luigi to return to his hometown to take them on, initially by strengthening his links with other families. However, before he is able to carry out his plans Luigi is summarily killed in the street. Rocco, arriving from Milan, is determined to take revenge but, before acting, he wants to know if his family is isolated or if it can count on the support of the other crime families. Leo, on the other hand, having had a strong attachment to his deceased uncle Luigi, feels that his duty is to solve things alone. He plans to kill the enemy boss, but is betrayed by his accomplice and killed. This upsets everyone involved, particularly his father Luciano who, after burning photos of his own father who died years before in an ambush by the rival clan, returns home, kills his younger brother Rocco, and seems as if he contemplates a suicide which would complete the extermination of all the men of his family and thus the lineage of violence.

== Cast ==
- Peppino Mazzotta: Rocco
- Marco Leonardi: Luigi
- Fabrizio Ferracane: Luciano
- Anna Ferruzzo: Antonia, Luciano's wife
- Giuseppe Fumo: Leo, Luciano's son
- Barbora Bobuľová: Valeria, Rocco's wife
- Aurora Quattrocchi: Rosa
- Paola Lavini: Lucia's mother

== Reception ==
=== Critical response ===
Black Souls has an approval rating of 91% on review aggregator website Rotten Tomatoes, based on 53 reviews, and an average rating of 7.4/10. The website's critical consensus states: "Black Souls works within familiar themes to explore intelligent -- and thrillingly entertaining -- dramatic arcs that plunge into the deliciously dark depths of Mafia crime". Metacritic assigned the film a weighted average score of 76 out of 100, based on 18 critics, indicating "generally favorable reviews".

=== Awards and nominations ===
Awards
Award	Category	Recipients and nominees	Result
71st Venice International Film Festival	Golden Lion	Francesco Munzi	Nominated
71st Venice International Film Festival	Pasinetti Award for Best Film	Francesco Munzi	Won
71st Venice International Film Festival	Mimmo Rotella Fondation Award	Luigi Musini	Won
71st Venice International Film Festival	Carlo Mazzacurati - Quality Screen Award	Francesco Munzi	Won
71st Venice International Film Festival	Akai Award for Best Direction	Francesco Munzi	Won
60th David di Donatello Awards	Best Film	Cinemaundici, Babe Films and Rai Cinema	Won
60th David di Donatello Awards	Best Director	Francesco Munzi	Won
60th David di Donatello Awards	Best Script	Francesco Munzi, Fabrizio Ruggirello & Maurizio Braucci	Won
60th David di Donatello Awards	Best Producer	Cinemaundici, Babe Films and Rai Cinema	Won
60th David di Donatello Awards	Best Actor	Fabrizio Ferracane	Nominated
60th David di Donatello Awards	Best Supporting Actress	Barbora Bobulova	Nominated
60th David di Donatello Awards	Best Cinematography	Vladan Radovic	Won
60th David di Donatello Awards	Best Production Design	Luca Servino	Nominated
60th David di Donatello Awards	Best Costumes	Marina Roberti	Nominated
60th David di Donatello Awards	Best Make-up	Sonia Maione	Nominated
60th David di Donatello Awards	Best Hairstyling	Rodolfo Sifari	Nominated
60th David di Donatello Awards	Best Editing	Cristiano Travaglioli	Won
60th David di Donatello Awards	Best Sound	Stefano Campus	Won
60th David di Donatello Awards	Best Score	Giuliano Taviani	Won
60th David di Donatello Awards	Best Song	Giuliano Taviani and Massimo De Lorenzo	Won
60th David di Donatello Awards	Youngs' David	Francesco Munzi	Nominated
