= The Panic =

- Directed by: Daniel Adams
- Written by: Daniel Adams
- Produced by: Michael Mailer; Mark Williams; Eric Williams; Sean Krajewski
- Starring: Cary Elwes; Colm Meaney; Cristiana Dell'Anna; Justin Chatwin; Malcolm McDowell
- Cinematography: Don E. FauntLeRoy
- Production companies: Mooncusser Filmworks; Rabbits Black
- Release date: October 16, 2025 (Buffalo International Film Festival)
- Running time: 120 minutes
- Country: United States
- Language: English

The Panic is a 2025 American period drama film about the Panic of 1907 in New York City, based on true events. Written and directed by Daniel Adams, the film stars Cary Elwes, Colm Meaney, Cristiana Dell'Anna, Justin Chatwin, and Malcolm McDowell.

The film premiered at the 2025 Buffalo International Film Festival on October 16 as the festival's Closing Night Gala Film, notable for being entirely shot in the city of Buffalo.

== Plot ==
Based on true events, the film centers on the Panic of 1907 in New York City, following a group of unscrupulous bankers and businessmen whose actions brought the American economy to the verge of collapse.

== Cast ==
- Cary Elwes as Charles Barney
- Colm Meaney as J.P. Morgan
- Cristiana Dell'Anna as Belle da Costa Greene
- Justin Chatwin as Herbert Satterlee
- Malcolm McDowell as Stanford White
- Anastasiya Mitrunen as Lily Barney
- Tim Daly as William Whitney
- Jefferson Mays as Teddy Roosevelt
- Jay Huguley as Charles Schwab
- Ned Bellamy as A. Foster Higgins
- Jason Alan Smith as Charles Morse
- Timothy McNeil as Fritz Heinze
- Dieter Riesle as Jacob Schiff
- Larry Petersen as George Cortelyou
- Elisabeth Adams as Helen Barney
- Alberto Frezza as Gianni Innocenti

== Production ==
Blue Fox Entertainment introduced the project to the international buyers at the 2024 Cannes Film Market in May, announcing that Donald Sutherland, Cary Elwes, Cristiana Dell'Anna, Justin Chatwin, Anastasiya Mitrunen and Malcolm McDowell are attached to star in the film. It was later revealed that Colm Meaney replaced Sutherland.

Principal photography began in Buffalo, New York on June 4, 2024, and concluded on June 27, 2024.

Many interior scenes were shot at the newly founded Great Point Studios in Buffalo. Other locations used for filming include the M&T Bank, Williams-Butler Mansion, Ellicott Square Building and Fort Niagara State Park.
