= A Classic Horror Story =

2021 film by Roberto De Feo and Paolo Strippoli

- Official release poster
- Directed by: Roberto De Feo; Paolo Strippoli
- Written by: Roberto De Feo; Paolo Strippoli; Lucio Besana; David Bellini; Milo Tissone
- Produced by: Maurizio Totti; Alessandro Usai
- Starring: Matilda Lutz; Francesco Russo; Peppino Mazzotta; William Merrick; Yuliia Sobol
- Cinematography: Emanuele Pasquet
- Edited by: Federico Palmerini
- Music by: Massimiliano Mechelli
- Production company: Colorado Film
- Distributed by: Netflix
- Release date: 14 July 2021
- Running time: 95 minutes
- Country: Italy
- Language: Italian
- Budget: $3 million

A Classic Horror Story is a 2021 Italian horror film written by Roberto De Feo, Paolo Strippoli, Lucio Besana, David Bellini and Milo Tissone, and directed by De Feo and Strippoli. The film stars Matilda Lutz, Francesco Russo, Peppino Mazzotta, William Merrick and Yuliia Sobol. The film was released on 14 July 2021 by Netflix.

== Plot ==
Elisa makes plans to carpool through a rideshare app to her parents' home in Calabria to get an abortion, though she is unsure about it. She boards an RV driven by travel blogger Fabrizio, accompanied by Riccardo, a doctor, and extroverted couple Sofia and Mark. When a bout of Elisa's morning sickness causes the group to pull over, Mark takes over driving for Fabrizio. That night, Mark drinks beer while driving and ends up crashing into a tree when he swerves to avoid running over the corpse of a goat. Elisa wakes up in the morning to see the group doing first aid on Mark's broken leg. They realize that they are no longer on the road, but are now in a clearing surrounded by a forest and cannot explain how they ended up there.

Despite finding a rustic cabin in the clearing, they do not enter. Fabrizio and Riccardo find three deformed scarecrows crucified with pig heads on stakes in a kind of altar; terrified, they leave. After Elisa enters the cottage, she discovers a ritualistic mural depicting three deities: Osso, Mastosso and Carcagnosso, which symbolize the leadership of a group that worships them in exchange for abundance and riches through human sacrifice. They decide to spend the night in the RV. When they hear screams coming from inside the house, everyone but Mark decides to go into the house to investigate. In the attic of the house, they discover a girl trapped inside a cocoon of hay. The group is horrified to discover the girl has had her tongue mutilated.

They witness Mark being dragged out of the RV by three masked figures, who bring him into the cabin and tie him to the living room table. Hiding in the attic, the group is forced to watch as the three masked figures torture and kill Mark by gouging out his eyes and breaking his feet with a wooden hammer. The trio drag Mark's body outside while the rest of the group waits for dawn to escape through the forest. After finding a graveyard of abandoned cars, they realize they are not the first victims of the cult's fanatics. The girl reveals her name, Chiara, through a diary. Chiara is the only survivor of her family.

The group finds themselves walking in circles as they return to the clearing again. Night falls and the group shares their personal stories as they drink the only beer bottle left. Elisa wakes up and sees all the followers of the sect standing in front of the house with Sofia, Chiara and Riccardo as hostages on a ritualistic stage. The masked figures representing Osso, Mastosso and Carcagnosso begin the ritual. Sofia has her eyes gouged out and Riccardo has his ears mangled. Their severed parts are placed on the gigantic scarecrow in which Chiara is trapped. Sofia and Riccardo have their throats cut as Elisa and Fabrizio watch from inside the cabin. Elisa realizes that Fabrizio had put sleeping pills in their alcohol and confronts him, discovering that he has a hidden earpiece. Angry, he instructs one of the cult members to take her and she is dragged outside.

She awakens in the morning at the head of a large table during one of the cult's meals, her hands nailed to the armrests of a wheelchair. She is taken into a control room, where she discovers that all the events she faced were recorded by hidden cameras and a production team overseeing everything. Fabrizio reveals that he is directing an amateur snuff movie, trying to create a classic horror story. After freeing herself, Elisa wanders through the camp of the film's production team.

She discovers that Chiara is still alive, and is an actress and sister to the director Fabrizio. Elisa catches the two discussing the next steps of the recording in a trailer. The local mayor is revealed to be part of the 'Ndrangheta, the regional Italian Mafia group, and the person sponsoring his film. When Chiara exits the vehicle, Elisa kills her with a shotgun. She then shoots Fabrizio in the leg, and he asks for mercy, but Elisa kills him as well, recording everything with a portable camera. She discovers an exit from the forest through a fence, which falsely labels the forest as a restricted military zone. Covered in blood, she emerges from the forest on a beach, recorded by bathers on cell phones as she dives into the sea.

In a post-credits scene, a BloodFlix app user is participating in a virtual chat about Fabrizio's movie that aired with the final footage of Elisa killing him. The user evaluates the movie negatively.

== Cast ==
- Matilda Lutz as Elisa
- Francesco Russo as Fabrizio
- Peppino Mazzotta as Riccardo
- William Merrick as Mark
- Yuliia Sobol as Sofia
- Alida Baldari Calabria as Chiara
- Cristina Donadio as Il Sindaco/Mother
- Francesca Cavallin

=== English dubbing ===
The English version was produced by Roundabout Entertainment in Burbank, California. Chelsea Pancho adapted the script and Joe Lynch directed the dub.

Role	Actor	Voice actor
Elisa	Matilda Lutz	Matilda Lutz
Fabrizio	Francesco Russo	Giuseppe Russo
Riccardo	Peppino Mazzotta	Peter Dobson
Mark	William Merrick	William Merrick
Sofia	Yuliia Sobol	Brooke Newton
Mother	Cristina Donadio	Dina Morrone

== Reception ==
In July 2021, The New York Times named A Classic Horror Story one of the top five horror films to watch in streaming.

On the review aggregator website Rotten Tomatoes, 58% of 12 critics' reviews are positive, with an average rating of 6.00/10.
