= Saint Anthony: The Miracle Worker of Padua =

2002 Italian television film

- Written by: Umberto Marino; Alessandra Caneva; Fernando Muraca
- Directed by: Umberto Marino
- Starring: Daniele Liotti
- Composer: Marco Frisina
- Country of origin: Italy
- Original language: Italian

Production
- Producer: Luca Bernabei
- Cinematography: Roberto Meddi
- Editor: Stefano Chierchié
- Running time: 102 min.

Original release
- Network: Canale 5
- Release: 2002

Saint Anthony: The Miracle Worker of Padua (Italian: Sant'Antonio di Padova, also known just as Saint Anthony) is a 2002 Italian television film co-written and directed by Umberto Marino. The film is based on real life events of Roman Catholic priest and Saint Anthony of Padua.

== Cast ==
- Daniele Liotti as Antonio
- Enrico Brignano as Giulietto
- José Sancho as Amerigo
- Peppino Mazzotta as Nuno
- Vittoria Puccini as Tereisa
- Francesco Stella as Pedro
- Glauco Onorato as Martino
- Pedro Casablanc as Francesco
- Luigi Maria Burruano as João

== Reception ==
The film was criticised for its lack of historical adherence. it was a ratings success, being watched by over 7 million viewers upon its premiere.
