= The Time It Takes (film) =

2024 film by Francesca Comencini

- Italian theatrical release poster
- Italian: Il tempo che ci vuole
- Directed by: Francesca Comencini
- Written by: Francesca Comencini
- Produced by: Simone Gattoni; Marco Bellocchio; Beppe Caschetto; Bruno Benetti; Sylvie Pialat
- Starring: Fabrizio Gifuni; Romana Maggiora Vergano
- Production companies: Kavac; IBC Movie; OneArt; Les films du Worso; Rai Cinema
- Distributed by: 01 Distribution; Charades
- Release dates: 6 September 2024 (Venice); 26 September 2024 (Italy)
- Running time: 110 minutes
- Countries: Italy; France
- Language: Italian

The Time It Takes (Italian: Il tempo che ci vuole) is a 2024 Italian-French drama film directed by Francesca Comencini. It stars Fabrizio Gifuni and Romana Maggiora Vergano. It premiered at the 81st Venice International Film Festival on 6 September 2024 and received a theatrical release in Italy on 26 September 2024.

== Premise ==
During the Years of Lead, a father and daughter share a passion for cinema. The film draws from director Francesca Comencini's relationship with her late father, the famous Italian director Luigi Comencini. The film is set during Comencini's shooting of the 1972 miniseries The Adventures of Pinocchio.

== Cast ==
- Fabrizio Gifuni as Luigi Comencini
- Romana Maggiora Vergano as Francesca Comencini
  - Anna Mangiocavallo as young Francesca

== Production ==
The film was announced in 2021 under the working title First Life, Then Cinema. Filming began in Rome in late August 2023.

== Release ==
Charades acquired the international distribution rights to the film on 3 September 2024. The trailer was released two days later, on 5 September.

The film premiered at the 81st Venice International Film Festival on 6 September 2024. It received a theatrical release in Italy on 26 September 2024. It was also featured in the Limelight section of the 54th International Film Festival Rotterdam to be screened in February 2025. It will also be featured at The 25th European Film Festival held in conjunction with 8th Malaysia International Film Festival in July 2025.

== Reception ==
Paola Casella of Mymovies.it gave the film four out of five stars and wrote, "With the courage of a lioness, Francesca Comencini recounts her relationship with her father, Luigi, in a free film that makes her personal story universal".

Damiano Panattoni of Movieplayer.it gave the film three-and-a-half out of five stars and wrote, "Intimate and very sweet, Francesca Comencini's tribute has the ability to speak to the public thanks to the universality of a private story in which one can find oneself, between gestures, words, silences, hugs. It may suffer from a certain rhetorical redundancy, but the emotion and ardor are such as to make Il tempo che ci vuole a congruent and emotional work, in its sincere, personal and loving gratitude."

Federico Pontiggia of Cinematografo.it gave the film two-and-a-half out of five stars, calling it "a touching and perfectible pas de deux", but criticizing its narrative structure.

Giulio Zoppello of Today rated the film 6.5 out of 10 and wrote "Il tempo che ci vuole is a coherent film but perhaps something is missing, above all the ability from the middle onwards to develop a story that is more than just images, it is as if there were a missing part, a segment that has not been offered to us. However, in its ability to be incredibly intimate, in the disenchantment with which Francesca Comencini speaks of herself, of that difficult past, net of a slightly cloying ending, there is a lot of vitality".

Anna Maria Pasetti of Il Fatto Quotidiano called the film "[Comencini's] most personal, emotional and thrilling film, and perhaps also her most beautiful."

== Awards and nominations ==
Award	Year	Category	Recipient(s)	Result	Ref.
David di Donatello	2025	Best Film	The Time It Takes	Nominated	
David di Donatello	2025	Best Director	Francesca Comencini	Nominated	
David di Donatello	2025	Best Original Screenplay	Francesca Comencini	Nominated	
David di Donatello	2025	Best Actress	Romana Maggiora Vergano	Nominated	
David di Donatello	2025	Best Actor	Fabrizio Gifuni	Nominated	
David di Donatello	2025	Young David	The Time It Takes	Nominated	
Nastri d'Argento	2025	Best Film	The Time It Takes	Won	
Nastri d'Argento	2025	Best Director	Francesca Comencini	Nominated	
Nastri d'Argento	2025	Best Screenplay	Francesca Comencini	Won	
Nastri d'Argento	2025	Best Actress	Romana Maggiora Vergano	Won	
Nastri d'Argento	2025	Best Actor	Fabrizio Gifuni	Won	
Nastri d'Argento	2025	Best Casting Director	Laura Muccino	Won	
Nastri d'Argento	2025	Best Production Design	Paola Comencini	Nominated	
Nastri d'Argento	2025	Best Costumes	Daria Calvelli	Nominated	
Nastri d'Argento	2025	Best Editing	Francesca Calvelli, Stefano Mariotti	Nominated	
Nastri d'Argento	2025	Best Score	Fabio Massimo Capogrosso	Nominated	
