= My Name Is Vendetta =

2022 Italian crime-thriller film

- Italian: Il mio nome è vendetta
- Directed by: Cosimo Gomez
- Written by: Sandrone Dazieri; Cosimo Gomez; Andrea Nobile
- Produced by: Maurizio Totti; Alessandro Usai; Iginio Straffi
- Starring: Alessandro Gassmann; Ginevra Francesconi
- Cinematography: Vittorio Omodei Zorini
- Edited by: Alessio Doglione
- Music by: Giorgio Giampà; Marta Lucchesini
- Production company: Colorado Film
- Distributed by: Netflix
- Release date: 30 November 2022
- Country: Italy
- Language: Italian

My Name Is Vendetta (Italian: Il mio nome è vendetta) is a 2022 Italian crime thriller film directed by Cosimo Gomez.

== Cast ==
- Alessandro Gassmann as Santo Romeo / Domenico Franzè
- Ginevra Francesconi as Sofia Romeo
- Alessio Praticò as Michele Lo Bianco
- Francesco Villano as Rudi Crisarà
- Gabriele Falsetta as Dr. Ferrario
- Marcello Mazzarella as Vituzzo
- Mauro Lamanna as Marino Gallo
- Sinja Dieks as Ingrid Gruber
- Luca Zamperoni as Patrick Gruber
- Remo Girone as Don Angelo Lo Bianco
- Isnaba Na Montche as Hakim

== Sequel ==
In 2023, producer Iginio Straffi stated that he's producing a sequel.

== See also ==
- List of Italian films of 2022
