= Margot Sikabonyi =

Italian actress

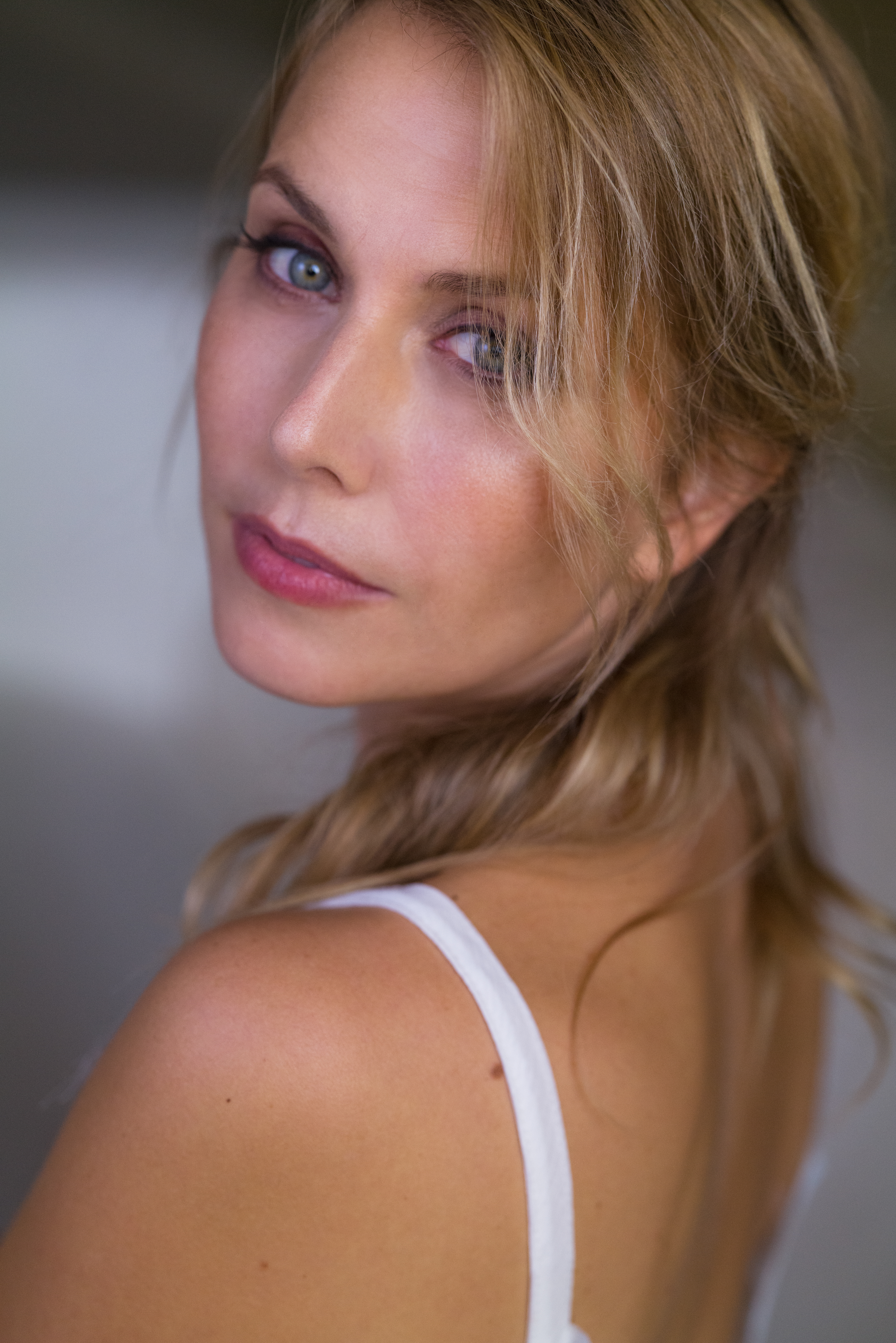
- Sikabonyi in 2019
- Born: Laura Marguerite Sikabonyi; 16 December 1982 (age 42); Rome, Italy
- Occupation: Actress
- Known for: Un medico in famiglia
- Partner: Jacopo Lupi
- Children: 2

Laura Marguerite "Margot" Sikabonyi (Italian: [marˈɡo ssikaˈbɔːni], Hungarian: [ˈʃikɒboɲi]; born 16 December 1982), is an Italian actress.

Born to a Canadian mother and a Hungarian father, she played the role of Maria Martini on the Italian TV series Un medico in famiglia from the series' inception in 1998 until the penultimate season 2014. In 2003 she won the Flaiano Award for Best Female Actress.
