= Francesca Cavallin =

Italian actress (born 1976)

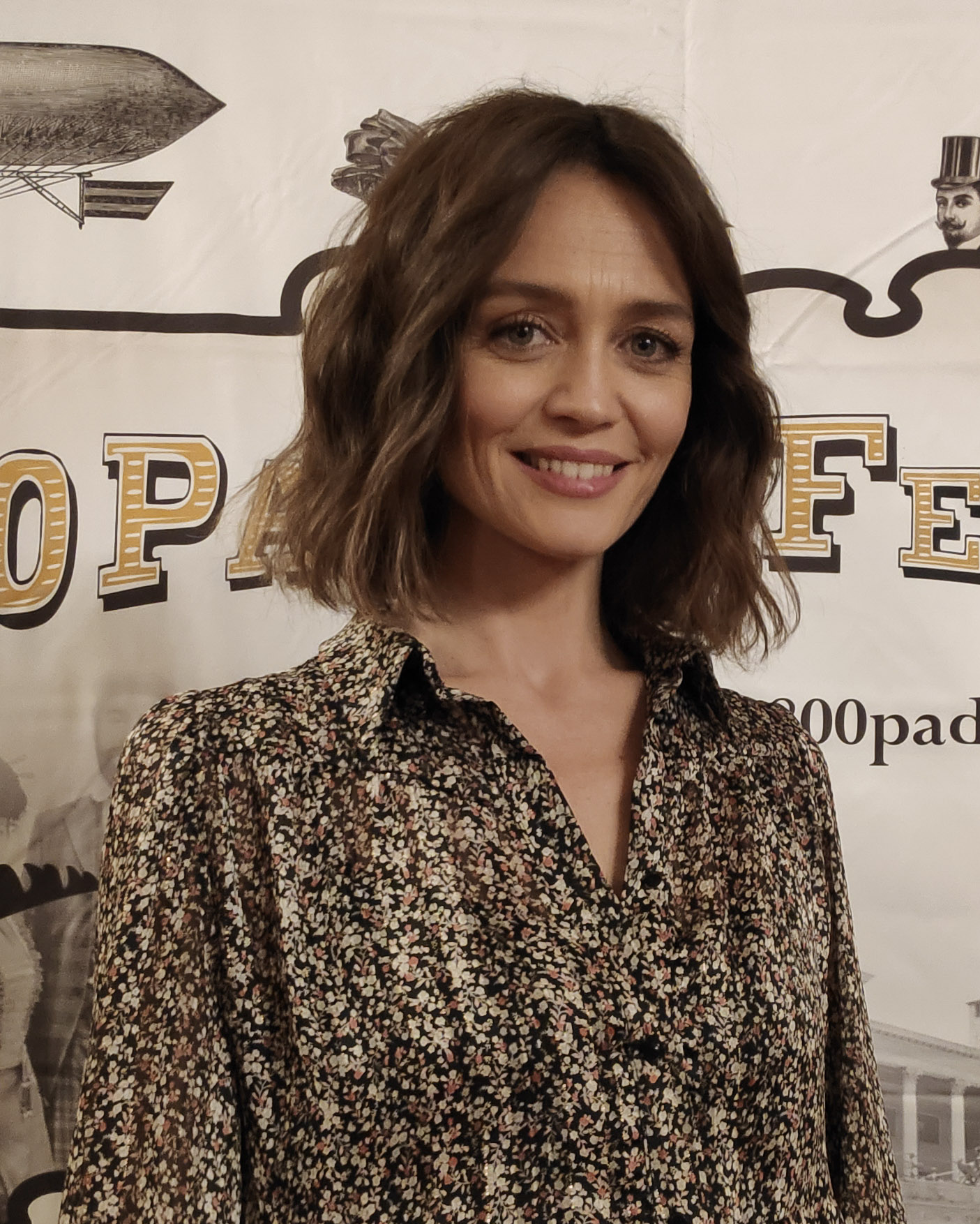
- Born: 23 June 1976 (age 48); Bassano del Grappa, Italy
- Occupation: Actress

Francesca Cavallin (born 23 June 1976) is an Italian television, stage and film actress.

== Life and career ==
Born in Bassano del Grappa, Cavallin graduated in modern literature with a contemporary art history major at the University of Padua. After studying at a drama academy and working as a model and an actress of commercials, she had her breakout in 2004, playing Irene Monteleone in the Canale 5 soap opera Vivere. She made her film debut in 2006, in the Jerry Calà's comedy Vita Smeralda.

In 2009 she landed her best known role, Bianca Pittaluga in the Rai 1 series Un medico in famiglia.

=== Personal life ===
During the 1990s, Cavallin suffered of bulimia and anorexia.

In 2012 Cavallin married Stefano Remigi, the son of the singer Memo. The couple had two sons and separated in 2017.

== Filmography ==
=== Film ===
Year	Title	Role(s)
2006	Vita Smeralda	Luana
2016	I babysitter	Marta
2017	Moglie e marito	Isabella
2019	The Nest	Elena
2021	A Classic Horror Story	Missing woman
2023	Still Time	Francesca

=== Television ===
Year	Title	Role(s)	Notes
2004–06	Vivere	Irene Monteleone	459 episodes
2007	Il generale Dalla Chiesa	Emanuela Setti Carraro	Television film
2008	Don Matteo	Dr. Chiara Brini	2 episodes
2008	Coco Chanel	Lady Diana	Television film
2009	Il bene e il male	Margherita Anastasi	12 episodes
2009	Puccini	Liza	Docuseries
2009–16	Un medico in famiglia	Bianca Pittaluga	79 episodes
2010	Restless Heart: The Confessions of Saint Augustine	Empress Justina	Television film
2011	Rossella	Sophie in Valeri	7 episodes
2012	Anita Garibaldi	Cristina Trivulzio Belgiojoso	Television film
2013	Tutta la musica del cuore	Angela Braschi	6 episodes
2013	Adriano Olivetti: La forza di un sogno	Paola Levi	Television film
2016	Rocco Schiavone	Nora	3 episodes
2017	Di padre in figlia	Pina Zanchetti	4 episodes
2018	Thou Shalt Not Kill	Virginia Conti	2 episodes
2019	Mentre ero via	Barbara Grossi	6 episodes
2019–21	La Compagnia del Cigno	Miriam Ciampolillo	24 episodes
2021	Un professore	Cecilia	10 episodes
2022	Vostro onore	Linda Canovi	8 episodes
2024	I fantastici 5	Sofia Calabresi	8 episodes
