= Peppino Mazzotta =

Italian actor (born 1971)

Peppino Mazzotta (born 20 May 1971) is an Italian actor, known for playing police officer Giuseppe Fazio in Il commissario Montalbano mystery series based on the character and novels created by Andrea Camilleri. Mazzotta is a native of Domanico (Province of Cosenza).

== Career ==
Born in the Calabrian town of Domanico in 1971, Mazzotta attended the Faculty of Architecture at the university of Reggio Calabria, then joined a Drama School at Palmi, and discovered his great acting passion. He later founded in Naples the theatre company Rosso Tiziano (Titian Red) together with five colleagues of the Palmi Academy, with whom he continues to collaborate. In 2003 he created a new theatre company, named Teatri del Sud (Southern Theatres), together with playwright and script-writer Francesco Suriano, who produced plays in the Calabrian dialect. The company closed after three years of activity, due to lack of financial support from the Arts, but Mazzotta is still very active in the regional theatre, especially in the production of Greek plays.

Peppino Mazzotta is best known for portraying police detective Giuseppe Fazio, in the renowned Italian television series Inspector Montalbano, produced and broadcast by RAI since 1999, and based on the detective novels of Andrea Camilleri. The protagonist is Commissario Salvo Montalbano, and Mazzotta plays his loyal, hyper-efficient right-hand man in the fictional town of Vigata, Sicily.

In the summer of 2012, during the Positano Theatre Festival, Mazzotta was awarded the Annibale Ruccello Prize for his theatrical production Radio Argo.

Mazzotta's career is currently divided between theatre, cinema and television, in a busy schedule of engagements and guest appearances. He continues to play Inspector Montalbano's assistant in the new episodes of the Italian TV series.

In autumn 2016 Mazzotta played Bruno Corona, a fictional 'Ndrangheta boss in "Solo" a dramatic television series broadcast by Canale 5 and set in Gioia Tauro, Calabria.

== Filmography ==
=== Films ===
Year	Title	Role	Notes
1999	Prima del tramonto	Matteo	
2001	Domenica	Peppino	
2004	A Children's Story	Luca	
2005	Che gioia!	Michele Conte	Short film
2007	Il pugile e la ballerina	Carletto	
2008	The Speed of Light	Mario	
2009	Cado dalle nubi	Livio	
2010	We Believed	Carmine Lopresti	
2011	Tienimi stretto	Don Masini	
2011	La misura del confine	Peppino	
2014	Black Souls	Rocco	
2016	Gramsci 44	Antonio Gramsci	
2018	Forgive Us Our Debts	Finance executive	Cameo appearance
2018	Aspettando la Bardot	Paolo	
2021	Bastardi a mano armata	Michele	
2021	A Classic Horror Story	Riccardo	
2022	I pionieri	Michele Belfiore	
2022	La caccia	Father	

=== Television ===
Year	Title	Role	Notes
1999–2021	Inspector Montalbano	Detective Giuseppe Fazio	Main role
2002	Saint Anthony: The Miracle Worker of Padua	Nuno	Television movie
2004	Paolo Borsellino	Captain Pellegrini	Television movie
2005	Distretto di Polizia	Stefano Renda	Episode: "La legge del cuore"
2007	Il capitano	Peppino Mazzoleni	Main role (season 2)
2007	R.I.S. Delitti Imperfetti	Pasquale Esposito	Episode: "A presto, Capitano"
2008	Per una notte d'amore	Marco	Television movie
2010	Crimini	Michele Fallà	Episode: "Niente di personale"
2010	Squadra antimafia	Raffaele Cannizzaro	5 episodes
2013	La mia bella famiglia italiana	Totò	Television movie
2016	Lampedusa - Dall'orizzonte in poi	Lieutenant Ragusa	Docuseries
2016–2018	Solo	Bruno Corona	Main role
2021	Cacciatore: The Hunter	Nicola Callipari	Episode: "Ciao nemico"
2025	Sara: Woman in the Shadows	Enrico Vigilante	Main role

== Stage credits ==
- La Torre D'Avorio
- Radio Argo, awarded the Premio della Critica, Florence 2011
- Requiescat
- L'arrobbafumu
- Alè Alè Cita
- A cascia 'nfernali
- Tomba di cani
- Illuminato a morte
- Tartuffe
- Il decimo anno
- La bisbetica domata
- La Celestina
- L' agnello del povero
- Molto rumore per nulla
- Giulio Cesare
