= Flowing (2022 film) =

2022 horror film

- Directed by: Paolo Strippoli
- Screenplay by: Paolo Strippoli; Jacopo Del Giudice; Gustavo Hernandez
- Starring: Fabrizio Rongione; Cristiana Dell'Anna; Francesco Gheghi; Aurora Menenti
- Cinematography: Cristiano Di Nicola
- Edited by: Marco Spoletini
- Music by: Raf Keunen
- Distributed by: Fandango
- Release date: 2022
- Countries: Italy; Belgium

Flowing (Italian: Piove) is a 2022 Italian-Belgian horror film co-written and directed by Paolo Strippoli, starring Fabrizio Rongione and Cristiana Dell'Anna.

== Cast ==
- Fabrizio Rongione as Thomas
- Cristiana Dell'Anna as Cristina
- Francesco Gheghi as Enrico
- Leon de la Vallée as Gianluca
- Ondina Quadri as Alice
- Orso Maria Guerrini as Mr. Ferrini
- Elena Di Cioccio as Marta
- Nicolò Galasso as Giacomo
- Federigo Ceci as Leonardo
- Pietro Bontempo as Giacomo's Father
- Aurora Menenti as Barbara
- Francesco Russo as Clerk

== Production ==
The screenplay of the film won the Solinas Prize in 2017. Principal photography started in Rome in February 2021. The film was produced by Propaganda Italia, in association with Polifemo and GapBusters.

== Release ==
The film had its world premiere at the 2022 Fantastic Fest, and was later screened in numerous festivals including Rome Film Festival, Sitges Film Festival, Brooklyn Horror Film Festival, Strasbourg European Fantastic Film Festival, and Trieste Science+Fiction Festival. It was released in Italian cinemas on 10 November 2022.

== Reception ==
La Repubblica's film critic Alberto Crespi praised the film, describing Flowing as 'a horror film with a mournful and melodramatic heart' that proved the genre being still alive, even in Italy. Camillo De Marco from Cineuropa described the film as an 'emotional horror film' inclinating 'towards a hybridisation of films observing society and genre films'. Douglas Davidson from Elements of Madness wrote: 'Though Flowing is very on-the-nose with its messaging, it’s no less impactful due to its creativity'. Sara D’Ascenzo from Corriere del Veneto was more critical of the film, noting it 'seem more like a rough draft, a film school graduation essay, than an accomplished artistic act'.
