= Gioacchino Criaco =

Italian writer

Gioacchino Criaco (born 3 March 1965, Africo) is an Italian writer.

== Life ==
Gioacchino Criaco was born in Africo, Calabria, to a family of shepherds. He went to a high school in Locri and studied law in Bologna. He worked as a lawyer in Milan until 2008, when his literary career took off.

His brother, Pietro Criaco is a member of the 'Ndrangheta and he lost his father in a vendetta in 1993.

The movie director Francesco Munzi adapted his debut novel Anime nere in 2014: Black Souls.

== Works ==
- Anime nere, 2008
- Zefira, 2009
- American Taste, 2011
- Perduta gente, 2012
- Il Saltozoppo, 2015
- L'agenda ritrovata, 2017
- La memoria del lupo, 2017
- La maligredi, 2018
