= The Nest (2019 film) =

2019 film

- Directed by: Roberto De Feo
- Screenplay by: Roberto De Feo; Margherita Ferri; Lucio Besana
- Starring: Francesca Cavallin; Ginevra Francesconi
- Cinematography: Emanuele Pasquet
- Edited by: Luca Gasparini
- Music by: Teho Teardo
- Release date: 2019
- Language: Italian

The Nest (Italian: Il nido) is a 2019 Italian horror film co-written and directed by Roberto De Feo. It premiered at the 72nd Locarno Film Festival in the Piazza Grande section. It was De Feo's first feature film, and he was nominated for best new director at Nastro D'Argento.

== Cast ==
- Francesca Cavallin as Elena
- Ginevra Francesconi as Denise
- Gabriele Falsetta as Igor
- Justin Korovkin as Samuel
- Maurizio Lombardi as Dr. Christian
- Cristina Golotta as Aunt Carla
- Fabrizio Odetto as Filippo
- Carlo Valli as Ettore
