= Carlo Valli =

Italian actor

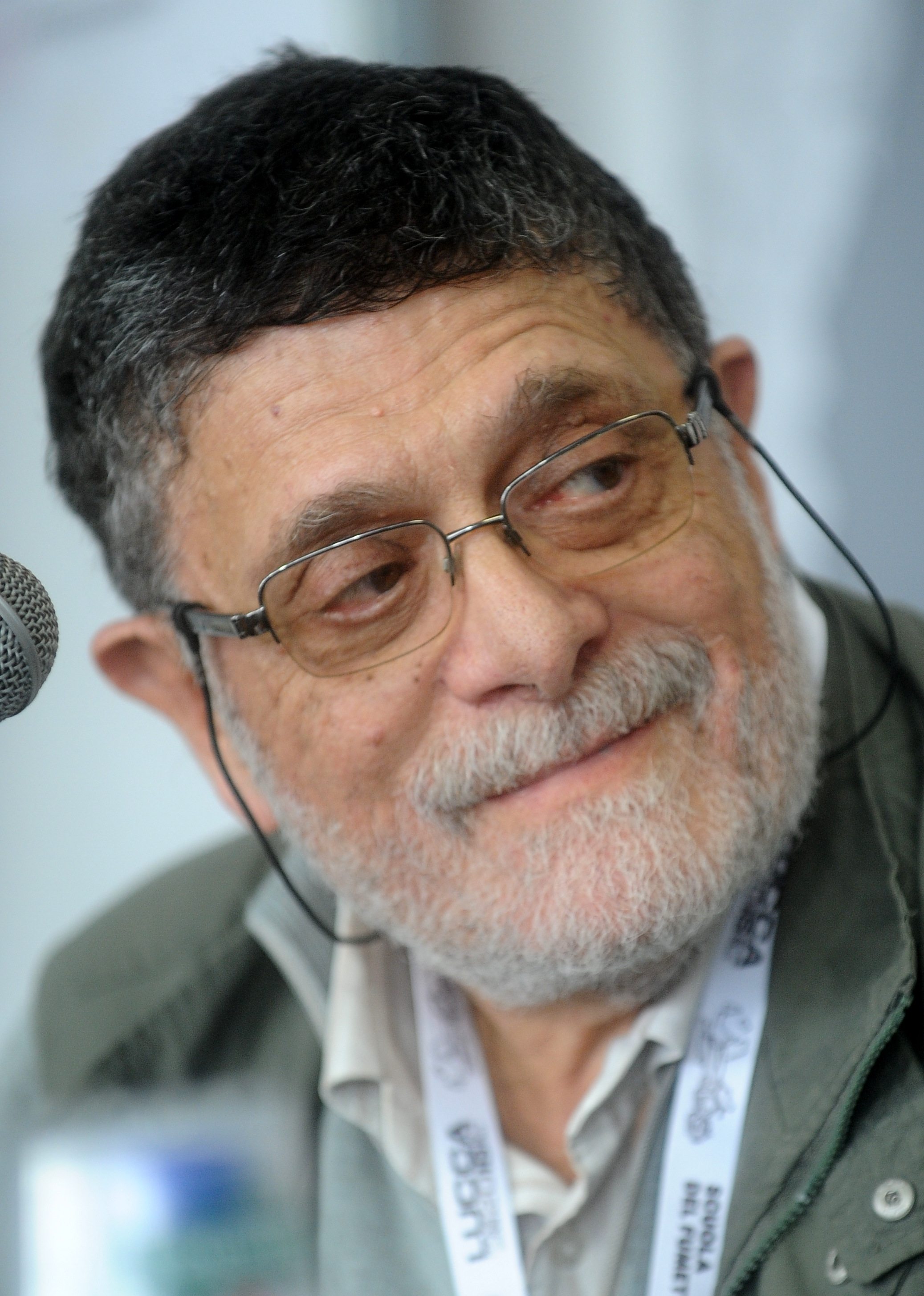
- Valli attending the Lucca Comics & Games convention in 2018
- Born: 4 October 1943 (age 82); Asti, Italy
- Occupations: Actor; voice actor; dubbing director; dubbing adapter
- Years active: 1966–present
- Spouse(s): Claudia Giannotti (divorced); Cristina Giachero
- Children: Ruggero; Arturo

Carlo Valli (born 4 October 1943) is an Italian actor and voice actor.

== Biography ==
Born in Asti, Valli started his career as a child in the radio industry. In 1965 he graduated at the Accademia Nazionale di Arte Drammatica Silvio D'Amico and then began performing at the Teatro Stabile d'Abruzzo, which marked the beginning of his long career as a stage actor. Valli also had key roles on stage and television. In the 1970s, he acted in the science fiction-drama miniseries Gamma as well as the detective fiction show La donna di picche, the politically-tinged crime film Chronicle of a Homicide, and more.

Valli later became well known to the Italian public as a voice actor and dubber, especially as the main Italian voice dubbing actor of Robin Williams. He is also renowned for dubbing Jim Broadbent, Colm Meaney, Richard Dreyfuss, Ken Stott, Martin Sheen, John Heard, Robert Duvall, Richard Jenkins and Kurt Russell in some of their movies. Some of the Italian dubbing roles that Valli is best known for includes Ghostface from the Scream film series and Horace Slughorn from the Harry Potter franchise.

In animation, Valli dubbed Rex in the Toy Story film series and Monsters, Inc., Gobber the Belch in the How to Train Your Dragon franchise, Pops in The Secret Life of Pets franchise and Merlin Ambrosius in Tales of Arcadia; he also took over as Bender's Italian voice in Futurama starting from season 8.

=== Personal life ===
Valli was once married to actress Claudia Giannotti. He is now married to voice actress Cristina Giachero. In 1998, Valli became a father for the first time at the age of 54 to voice actor Ruggero Valli. In 2000 he had another son, Arturo, who is also a voice actor.

== Filmography ==
=== Cinema ===
- Chronicle of a Homicide (1972) - Alfio Ricci
- Special Cop in Action (1976) - Rocchi
- Viens chez moi, j'habite chez une copine (1981)
- Le leggi del desiderio (2015) - Alfio Canton
- The Nest (2019) - Ettore
- Der Doktor - L'ombra della morte (2024) - Cardinal Tavi

=== Television ===
- Jack e Jill – TV miniseries (1956)
- Ed egli si nascose – TV play (1966) - A soldier
- I giusti – TV play (1970) - Foka
- Un certo Harry Brent - TV miniseries (1970) - Young photographer
- La donna di picche – TV miniseries (1972) - Correll
- È stata una bellissima partita – TV miniseries, fourth episode (La rivincita) (1972) - Tanino
- Orlando Furioso – TV miniseries (1974) - Ferragut
- Senza uscita – TV miniseries, episode Mia cara Anna, addio (1974)
- La contessa Lara – TV miniseries (1975) - Pierantoni
- Tracce sulla neve – TV film (1975)
- Gamma – TV miniseries (1975) - dr. Piantoni
- Tatort – TV series, episode Wohnheim Westendstraße (1976) - Romano Darfu
- L'assassinio di Federico Garcia Lorca – TV miniseries (1976) - José Rosales
- Abramo Lincoln in Illinois – TV play (1976) - Billy Herndon
- Chi? – TV mystery/quiz (1976-1977) - Various roles
- Il povero soldato – TV miniseries (1978) - Don De Luca
- Un amore di Dostoevskij – TV miniseries (1978)
- Così per gioco – TV miniseries (1979) - Architect Gaetano Marzi
- La bugiarda – TV play (1979) - Albino
- Quell'antico amore – TV miniseries (1981) - Carra
- Giallo sera - TV mystery/quiz (1983)
- Piccolo mondo antico – TV miniseries (1983) - Pedraglia
- Un delitto – TV miniseries (1984)
- Disperatamente Giulia – TV miniseries (1989)
- Un figlio a metà – TV miniseries (1992) - Goffredo, Sandro's coworker
- Un figlio a metà - Un anno dopo – TV miniseries (1994) - Goffredo, Sandro's coworker
- Italian Restaurant – TV series, episode Figlio, figlio... mio? (1994) - Tony Messina
- Il maresciallo Rocca – TV series, episode 1.2 (Senso di colpa) (1996) - Augusto Meroli
- Incantesimo – soap opera (2000) - Francesco Masi

=== Short films ===
- Wind Back (2017) - Old Man
- TOB.IA (2020) - Director
- Our Good Hands (2020) - Italian storyteller

== Voice work ==
Year	Title	Role	Notes	Ref
1996	La lupa	Narrator	Drama film	
2003	Il magico Natale di Rupert	Narrator	Fantasy film	
2012	Pinocchio	The Talking Cricket	Animated film	
2015	Una meravigliosa stagione fallimentare	Narrator	Documentary	
2015	Ancora Vivi - La Storia della Bar Boon Band	Narrator	Documentary	
2015	La dolce arte di esistere	Narrator	Drama film	
2019	Manuale di storie dei cinema	Cosmic Bob	Short film - Documentary	
2021	Manuale di storie dei cinema	Cosmic Bob	Documentary	
2022	Watch Out, We're Mad!	Narrator	A remake of the 1974 film of the same name	
2024	Degnità: aforismi, massime, postulati di una vita	Narrator ("Pino Silvestre" segment)	Short film	

=== Live action ===
- Rizzo in The Sentinel
- Rusty James’ father in Rumble Fish
- Spinetti's henchman, neighbor and additional voices in È arrivato mio fratello
- Jack Dundee in The Best of Times
- Adrian Cronauer in Good Morning, Vietnam
- Sam Whitemoon and The Hitchhiker in Creepshow 2
- Angels' manager and doctor in The Naked Gun: From the Files of Police Squad!
- Harry Ellis / James in Die Hard
- Peter McCallister in Home Alone, Home Alone 2: Lost in New York
- Col in The Crying Game
- Andy Safian in Malice
- Dessie Curley in The Snapper
- Mitch Kellaway in The Mask
- Al Angel in Angels in the Outfield
- Howard Payne in Speed
- Hector in Being Human
- Daniel Hillard / Euphegenia Doubtfire in Mrs. Doubtfire
- Hunter "Patch" Adams in Patch Adams
- Jack Powell in Jack
- Ghostface in Scream, Scream 2, Scream 3, Scream 4
- The Professor in The Secret Agent
- Osric in Hamlet
- Larry in The Van
- Terek Murad in The Jackal
- Professor Philip Brainard in Flubber
- Sean Maguire in Good Will Hunting
- John Keating in Dead Poets Society
- Bob Munro in RV
- Seymour "Sy" Parrish in One Hour Photo
- Leslie Zevo in Toys
- Chris Nielsen in What Dreams May Come
- Lance Clayton in World's Greatest Dad
- Maxwell "Wizard" Wallace in August Rush
- Joey O'Brien in Cadillac Man
- Dr. Cozy Carlisle in Dead Again
- Dr. Kosevich in Nine Months
- John Jacob Jingleheimer Schmidt in To Wong Foo, Thanks for Everything! Julie Newmar
- Armand Goldman in The Birdcage
- Duncan Malloy in Con Air
- Mel in Deconstructing Harry
- Charlie Boyd in Noel
- Walter Finch in Insomnia
- Alan Hakman in The Final Cut
- Paul Barnell in The Big White
- Tom Dobbs in Man of the Year
- Gavin in Five Fingers
- Reverend Frank Dorman in License to Wed
- Dan Rayburn in Old Dogs
- Dwight D. Eisenhower in The Butler
- Father Bill Moinighan in The Big Wedding
- Henry Altmann in The Angriest Man in Brooklyn
- Mitch Mitchler in A Merry Friggin' Christmas
- Dennis the Dog in Absolutely Anything
- Trufflehunter in The Chronicles of Narnia: Prince Caspian
- Horace Slughorn in Harry Potter and the Half-Blood Prince, Harry Potter and the Deathly Hallows – Part 2
- Tom Hepple in Another Year
- Mr. Tyree in Dear John
- Steven Mayhew in One Day
- Balin in The Hobbit: An Unexpected Journey, The Hobbit: The Desolation of Smaug, The Hobbit: The Battle of the Five Armies
- Denis Thatcher in The Iron Lady
- Captain Molyneux / Vyvyan Ayrs / Timothy Cavendish in Cloud Atlas
- Nick Burrows in Le Week-End
- Roger in The Face of Love
- Samuel Gruber in Paddington, Paddington 2
- Fred Herbert in Big Game
- Santa Claus in Get Santa
- Underwood in The Lady in the Van
- Prime Minister in The Legend of Tarzan
- Tony Webster in The Sense of an Ending
- Thomas "Doc" Durant in Hell on Wheels
- Jerry Lynch in Intermission
- Don Revie in The Damned United
- Detective Dunnigan in Law Abiding Citizen
- Jonathan Snow in Get Him to the Greek
- CIA Agent in The Cold Light of Day
- Roland Potts in One Chance
- Stanley Best in The Mercy
- Colonel Picquart in Prisoner of Honor
- Chris Leece in Another Stakeout
- Irv Gideon in My Life in Ruins
- Buddy Green in The Last Laugh
- George in Book Club
- Earl Huttinger in Rumor Has It
- Richard in Eat Pray Love
- Driver in Killing Them Softly
- Jed Lewis in The Company You Keep
- Delbert McGinty in We Bought a Zoo
- Lou Levov in American Pastoral
- James Harvey in Casper
- Fred Madison in Lost Highway
- Sonny Dewey in The Apostle
- Ely in The Road
- Scott Briggs in Wild Horses
- Tom Mulligan in Widows
- Snake Plissken in Escape from New York
- Jack Burton in Big Trouble in Little China
- Michael Carr in Unlawful Entry
- Pavel in The Boy in the Striped Pyjamas
- Lennox in Macbeth
- Ewart in Viceroy's House
- Ted in Finding Your Feet
- Oliver Thompson in Mesmerized
- Lamar Blackburn in The Accountant
- Don Whitaker in Daddy's Home 2
- Crowley in Stay Tuned
- Mr. Habib in Father of the Bride Part II
- Max Yasgur in Taking Woodstock
- Walder Frey in Game of Thrones
- Arthur Jeffries / Professor Proton in The Big Bang Theory, Young Sheldon
- Uncle Martin / The Martian in My Favorite Martian
- Kroenig in Sin City: A Dame to Kill For
- Feck in River's Edge
- Maury in Mouse Hunt
- Roger Barlow in The Maiden Heist
- Robert Plath in This Must Be the Place
- Lucky in Lucky
- Seal and Signet Minister in Jupiter Ascending
- H. Clifford McBride in Ad Astra
- Sam Harris in Last Vegas
- Tooth Fairy in The Santa Clause 2
- Max Belfort in The Wolf of Wall Street
- Sherlock Holmes in Mr. Holmes
- Murad Hoxha in Taken 2

==== Animation ====
- Rex in Toy Story, Toy Story 2, Toy Story 3, Toy Story 4, Toy Story of Terror!, Toy Story That Time Forgot, Hawaiian Vacation, Small Fry, Partysaurus Rex, Monsters, Inc., Buzz Lightyear of Star Command: The Adventure Begins
- Gobber the Belch in How to Train Your Dragon, How to Train Your Dragon 2, How to Train Your Dragon: The Hidden World, DreamWorks Dragons
- Narrator in Hey Duggee, Horton Hears a Who!, Pom Poko
- Commander Nebula in Buzz Lightyear of Star Command: The Adventure Begins, Buzz Lightyear of Star Command
- Pops in The Secret Life of Pets, The Secret Life of Pets 2
- Robin Williams, Jay Leno and coach (episode 15.16) in Family Guy
- Dewey Largo (season 1) and Robin Williams (episode 28.19) in The Simpsons
- Number 9 Man (season 5) and Bender Bending Rodríguez (season 8) in Futurama
- Charlie in Finding Dory
- Fender in Robots
- Principal Stickler in Teacher's Pet
- Gaëtan "Mole" Molière in Atlantis: Milo's Return
- Jacob Marley in A Christmas Carol
- Shifu in Kung Fu Panda: Legends of Awesomeness, Kung Fu Panda 4
- Station in Lloyd in Space
- Ernie Clicker in Arthur Christmas
- Baron Von Steamer in Big Hero 6: The Series
- Mr. Robbins in Ozzy
- Dorgle in Smallfoot
- Mr. Brown in Postman Pat: The Movie
- Oogway in Kung Fu Panda: The Paws of Destiny
- Scrubby in Robinson Crusoe
- Bamboo Cutter in The Tale of the Princess Kaguya
- Lars in ChalkZone

=== Video games ===
- Gaëtan "Mole" Molière in Atlantis: The Lost Empire
- Bomb Voyage in The Incredibles
- Blue Gremlin in Epic Mickey 2: The Power of Two
- Announcer and Rex in Disney Infinity
- Donan in Diablo IV
