= Francesco Russo (actor) =

Italian actor (born 1993)

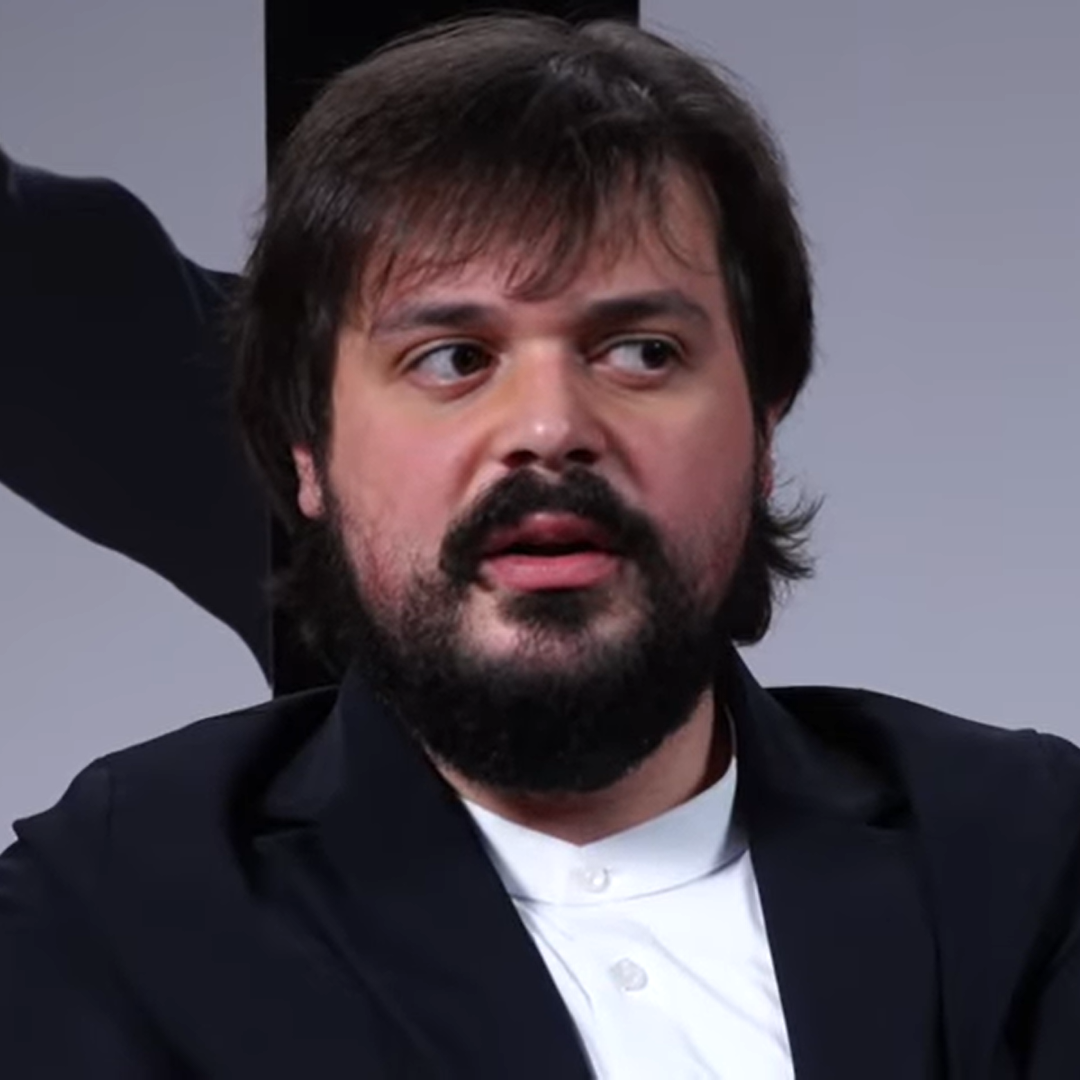
- Russo in 2025
- Born: 1993 (age 32–33); Santa Maria Capua Vetere, Caserta, Italy
- Education: Accademia Nazionale di Arte Drammatica Silvio D'Amico
- Occupation: Actor
- Years active: 2014–present

Francesco Russo (Italian pronunciation: [franˈtʃesko ˈrusso]; born 1993) is an Italian actor. He is best known for his roles as Fabrizio in the slasher film A Classic Horror Story (2021) and as Bruno Soccavo in the HBO drama television series My Brilliant Friend (2020–2022). He also played Cesare Rossi in the biographical historical drama television series Mussolini: Son of the Century (2025).

== Biography ==
Russo was born in Santa Maria Capua Vetere, Caserta. His father is a geologist and his mother works for the Local Health Authority. He attended a liceo classico in his hometown. He began acting at the age of five for an amateur theater company. At the age of 19, he moved to Rome to pursue acting professionally, and graduated from the National Academy of Dramatic Arts.

== Filmography ==
=== Film ===
Year	Title	Role	Ref.
2015	Burning Love	Guglielmo	
2017	Classe Z	Ugo Malavasi	
2019	Tuttapposto	Pietro	
2021	A Classic Horror Story	Fabrizio	
2021	Freaks Out	Clown	
2021	Una notte da dottore	Antonio	
2022	Flowing	Commesso Ferramenta	
2024	Eravamo bambini	Cacasotto	
2024	Parthenope	Pippo	
2024	Dedalus	Filippo	
2025	Fantasy Football Ruined Our Lives	Nicola	
2026	Cena di classe	Romeo	

=== Television ===
Year	Title	Role	Notes	Ref.
2014–2016	Zio Gianni	Rodolfo	40 episodes	
2021	Ritoccàti	Tobia	7 episodes	
2020–2022	My Brilliant Friend	Bruno Soccavo	5 episodes	
2022	Filumena Marturano	Michele Esposito	Television film	
2023–2025	Call My Agent - Italia	Pierpaolo Puglisi	18 episodes	
2025	Mussolini: Son of the Century	Cesare Rossi	8 episodes	
2025	Fantacalcio - La serie	Chicco	4 episodes	
2025	Portobello	Studio assistant	2 episodes	
