= Un medico in famiglia =

- Genre: Soap opera
- Created by: Carlo Bixio
- Starring: See below
- Opening theme: "Ai ai ai" by Los Locos (s. 1-5) "Je T'aime" by Giulia Luzi (s. 6-10)
- Composer: Andrea Guerra
- Country of origin: Italy
- Original language: Italian
- No. of seasons: 10
- No. of episodes: 286

Production
- Executive producers: Carlo Bixio; Verdiana Bixio
- Production locations: Cinecittà, Rome
- Running time: 45–60 minutes
- Production companies: Publispei; Rai Fiction

Original release
- Network: Rai 1
- Release: 6 December 1998 – 24 November 2016

Related
- Médico de familia

Un medico in famiglia (English: A doctor in the family) is an Italian television series, based on the format of the Spanish series of Telecinco Médico de familia, produced by Publispei and Rai Fiction. The series aired for ten seasons on Rai 1 from 6 December 1998 to 24 November 2016.

Since the first season aired, the series immediately became one of the most famous Italian TV series of all time. In 1999 it won the Best Fiction Award and the Best TV Program of the Year Award, two acknowledgements regularly awarded by the Italian TV networks, and the Telegatto for the Best Italian TV Series.

== Premise ==
The show focuses on the Martini family living in the fictional neighbourhood of Poggiofiorito (literally Flowery knoll), a quiet residential zone in Rome's suburbs. The patriarch is Gabriele "Lele" Martini, a widower doctor who works in an experimental local Community Health Center (ASL in Italian). His father Libero Martini is a Marxist retired railway worker who, a widower himself, lives with his son and helps him to take care of his children.

The doctor has three children: Maria, Francesco "Ciccio" and Anna "Annuccia". The family is completed by the extravagant and noisy Southern maid Concetta "Cettina" Gargiulo and by Lele's teen nephew Alberto, who lives with his uncle and cousins while his parents are divorcing.

Despite its comedic tone, the show sometimes involves serious subjects.

== Episodes ==
Series	Episodes	Originally released	
Series	Episodes	First released	Last released
1	52	6 December 1998	30 May 1999
2	26	27 February 2000	21 May 2000
3	26	16 March 2003	25 May 2003
4	26	26 September 2004	3 December 2004
5	26	15 March 2007	29 May 2007
6	26	20 September 2009	23 November 2009
7	26	27 March 2011	26 May 2011
8	26	3 March 2013	19 May 2013
9	26	16 March 2014	29 May 2014
10	26	7 September 2016	24 November 2016

=== Season 1 ===
1998. The Martini family, consisting of Gabriele 'Lele' Martini, a widowed family doctor, his three children — teenager Maria, pre-teen Francesco, nicknamed Ciccio, and toddler Annuccia — and their sixty-year-old grandfather Libero, a retired railway worker, moves into a new home in Poggio Fiorito, in the Roman countryside. The purchase of the house was the final decision Lele and his late wife, Elena, made together.

For Lele's kids, the new life in Poggio Fiorito is not easy. Everyone is unhappy about leaving their friends, and the idea of changing school does not appeal to them. Maria, in particular, is struggling to fit in until she befriends Reby. Lele hires an au pair to help with chores as his father looks after the children while he works. Concetta 'Cettina' Gargiulio initially poses as a Polish immigrant but eventually reveals her colourful Campanian origins from Mondragone. The family also welcomes Alberto Foschi, sixteen-year-old son to Lele's older sister, Nilde. His parents are going through a bitter divorce, and it is affecting his well-being. To complicate and complete the family picture are Lele's sister-in-law Alice and her parents, the snobbish Enrica and Nicola Solari, as well as Lele's best friend, Giulio Pittaluga.

Lele works at the Local Health Authority (ASL). His colleagues contribute to the antics of the series. Dr. Mariano Valenti, constantly hungry and looking for love; Dr. Laura Mercanti, who harbours romantic feelings for Lele; and receptionist Jonis Muheddin. Last but not least, Tea Molinari, obstetrician, and Jessica, a nurse. The hospital is headed by demanding and boorish Dr Giorgio Giorgi. After Laura leaves, she's replaced by Dr. Oscar Nobili, a psychiatrist whose homosexuality leads to harassment on the workplace. At the ASL, Lele follows several patients and this provides an opportunity to address various issues such as HIV/AIDS, violence against women, exploitation of child labour, and epilepsy.

As the family adjust to their new life after the loss of Elena and their new home, Lele moves on with his sentimental life. After a brief flirt with Laura, he dates Irene Falcetti, a pediatrician, but his heart keeps telling him to pursue Alice, despite both of them trying to resist their mutual attraction. Alice is a step away from marrying Sergio, but when he turns abusive and beats her, she dumps him. Alice is about to leave for Africa to work on a documentary on war zones when Lele chases after the airplane to confess Alice his love, and he is stopped by guards.

=== Season 2 ===
Lele is anxiously waiting for Alice's return from her reportage job in Africa. Throughout the second series of episodes, Lele and Alice will have to figure out if their love will stand the test of time. Alice is particularly distressed by the idea that she's is stealing her sister's place but Lele reassures her by saying, "You are not taking me away Elena, it's the fate that took her away to me". Alice suffers a miscarriage and is told she is never going to be able to carry future pregnancies just as Nilde gives birth to a mixed race baby boy she names after her brother, Lele Junior. Newly divorcée Grandma Enrica finds reasons to visits the Martinis, even if it means bickering often with Grandpa Libero.

Problems at Martini's household don't lack, and the second series tackles further social issues throughout its run. Alice is stalked by a follower of her radio programme, Cettina and her fiancé Giacinto are having financial difficulties, and Maria is approaching womanhood. Alberto spirals into depression after he's involved in a car accident that leaves his friend Adriano paralysed. In addition, Dr. Giorgi dies due to complications after undergoing surgery.

Alongside the sadness, the Martini family and their friends have joyous moments. Despite the previous diagnosis, Alice gets pregnant again and is married to Lele. For the occasion, Giulio comes back from Africa, where he's working to be Lele's best man. In a tense moment, Alice gives birth to twins in an elevator with the help of Cettina and Maria. She names the twins Elena, after her sister, and Libero after Grandapa Libero. The event further convinces Maria to pursue medicine at university once she graduates.

=== Season 3 ===
Three years later, Lele is working in Australia in order to study a new cure for a rare infantile disease. Alice is currently working in Brazil but will soon join him and the twins.

Back in Italy, the Martini are adjusting to the new family dynamics. Grandpa Libero is struggling to make ends meet and look after his growing grandchildren. For this reason, he decides to rent Lele's vacant room. After a series of bizarre circumstances, Dr Guido Zanin ends up living with them. He is the new titular 'doctor in the family', a surgeon from Milan who previously met Maria on campus as she enrolled for the medicine faculty. Guido becomes fond of the Martini, particularly Libero and Annuccia (who projects a transference of her father onto the young doctor) and starts to consider them as the family he never had since he grew up in an orphanage. Guido and Maria are mutually attracted to each other but are initially advised against it by respective friends due to Guido being 10 years her senior. In the meantime, Guido dates Carlotta Wilson, a nutritionist suffering from a phobia of physical contact due to maternal trauma. Maria, instead, starts hanging out with Gianluca Chiodelli, a young lawyer from an upper-class family that Grandma Enrica is acquainted with. However, the man turns out to be addicted to cocaine and cheating on Maria when he tries to seduce her friend Jessica.

Marcello, Guido's best friend, takes over Alice's job at Radio Tua whilst Cettina finds out that Giacinto married another woman after disappearing for months without a word. She eventually stars believing in love again when she meets Augusto Torello, her choir director. However, upon finding he is also the director of Torellhonor, a renowned funeral home hailing from Lombardy, Cettina is concerned about what people might think as well as being superstitious about a death-related job.

The local ASL now directed by Alida Castellani continues to be a way to address social and health problems such as the aforementioned nutritionism related to eating disorders such as bulimia, phobias, loneliness and social isolation of elderly people, substance abuse. Dr Zanin, in particular, becomes involved in several projects in the district.

Grandpa Libero has a heart attack when he mistakenly thinks that Gianluca has involved his beloved niece Maria in drug trafficking. Meanwhile, Jessica and Oscar have sex whilst drunk and sad over their respective lives despite he is gay. This poor choice affects them in the long run when Jessica finds out she is pregnant and does not know whether the child is Oscar's or Giovanni's, her boyfriend who renounces his vocation to become a priest to form a family with Jessica and the unborn child. At the same time, the romance between Maria and Guido seems to be over due to an unfortunate misunderstanding, but she runs to declare her love for him by shouting it at the train station, following Lele's example at the airport. They reconciled in time to attend Cettina and Augusto's wedding.

=== Season 4 ===
The Martini family is back from their visits to Lele, Alice, and the twins in Australia. Guido is tired of shuttling back and forth between Rome and Milan, where he is stationed after the transfer he obtained when he and Maria had broken up, and only sees Maria for a few hours a week. The two decide to move in together first in Milan, but when Guido gets the transfer to Rome, the two can live out their love close to their family. Cettina and Augusto gift the couple the little villa next door to their new home, bought right next door from the Martini house. Guido and Maria's relationship is hindered by the arrival of Franco Caselli who has come to train medical volunteers for the humanitarian organisation 'Doctors Against War', an in-universe adaptation of Doctors Without Borders. Franco and Maria will have a brief affair against Grandpa Libero's wishes, who have come to see Guido as his own grandson.

Meanwhile, the now sixteen-year-old Ciccio gets engaged to Miranda, the daughter of Andrea Biglietti, who is the new partner of his aunt Nilde. They dodge a pregnancy scare that brings up a few unresolved tension in the young couple. Namely, their plans for the future — Ciccio would like to settle down, but Miranda has different ideas in mind.

Grandpa Libero is diagnosed with a serious heart problem requiring immediate open-heart surgery. In order not to lose his decent pension as a former railwayman and to leave his grandchildren in financial difficulties, Grandpa Libero and Grandma Enrica decide to get married. Enrica has, in fact, become more and more present at the Martini house she moved into after losing all her assets in a Ponzi scheme in which her ex-husband Nicola was tricked into. Turns out it was a misdiagnosis, but Libero and Enrica realised they had grown fond of each other, and with the children and grandchildren all grown up, they'll care and keep each other company. Unbeknownst to them, friends and family discovered their plan to marry in secret and surprise them on the wedding day.

At the ASL, now converted into a private clinic with the hard work of Guido and the rest of the staff who otherwise risked being sent to other facilities following the closure, former colleagues of Lele are now Guido and Maria's friends and colleagues. Maria finds out that the obstetrician Tea writes romance novels and, through Enrica, sets up a meeting with a publisher. Nurse Jessica is raising her daughter Agnese with Giovanni and "uncle" Oscar, who is more involved in the child's life than her dad. Moreover, through DNA paternity testing and with the help of a reluctant Guido, Oscar finds out he's Agnese's biological father. Jessica and Giovanni break up, and he can finally follow his vocation for priesthood. Around the same time, Maria and Guido reconcile and decide to get married before leaving for Africa to work as volunteers for Franco's organisation.

Lele returns in time for the wedding and is overwhelmed by the changes that have taken place over the years during his absence. In particular, Annuccia resents him and suffers from emotional abandonment, making it difficult to reconnect with her father. On the day of the wedding, Maria and Guido inform their family and friends of their plan to fly to Nigeria with Doctors Against War while Cettina finds out she's pregnant after several unsuccessful attempts.

=== Season 5 ===
Another two and a half years have passed. Dr. Emilio Villari moves in with the Martini family as a paying guest. Emilio is Alba's fiancé. She is the daughter of one of Grandma Enrica's cousins, Gualtiero di Serravalle. Emilio takes over Lele's job at the clinic whilst the latter is working at the Sorbonne in Paris. Serravalle is the major shareholder and owner of the clinic, and the doctors in Poggio Fiorito perceive Emilio as a spy.

The fifth series opens with the arrest of Andrea Biglietti, Aunt Nilde's boyfriend, who was defrauded by a colleague in the illegal acquisition of some villas in the residential neighborhood of Poggio Fiorito. Grandpa Libero steps in to help his daughter in order to sell the houses and regain part of the money. The villas are sold to Martini's friends — Mariano, Oscar, and Tea — as well as becoming the headquarters of the new polyclinic run by Dr. Oscar Nobili.

Meanwhile, Poggio Fiorito becomes autonomous municipality, and Grandfather Libero is elected mayor. Alberto and Eloisa break up, and the boy returns home. Carlo Foschi, who had abandoned Alberto and his mother years before, comes back into his life. Having learned of Carlo's illness and how the events of his estrangement had really gone, Alberto resumes contact with his father in an attempt to enjoy the last days they have left together.

Cettina and Augusto Torello have fulfilled their dream of becoming parents and have a child named Eros. However, their family idyll is ruined by the arrival of Kabir Dahvi, for whom Cettina has a crush because he resembles the fictional pirate Sandokan (in real life, Kabir Bedi starred in the 1976 miniseries Sandokan). Kabir is the owner of an Indian restaurant recently opened where once stood Guido and Maria's house. Kabir lives with his three grandchildren — boys Sadju and Sumede, who are peers to Ciccio and Annnuccia, respectively, and Dr. Sarita Dahvi, who starts working at the polyclinic and whose holistic approach to medicine, leads to an argument with Western medicine traditionalist Dr. Emilio Villari. The two end up in a star-crossed, intense loving relationship.

Kabir and Granpa Libero are often bickering due to their cultural clash, and the fact that Kabir opposes Sarita's relationship to Emilio, whom Libero started to consider as part of his family, due to the last wish of Sarita's parents that she married the son of family friends. Kabir also rejects Cettina's advances, leading the woman to move with Eros to Pescara, Abruzzi, after she separates from her husband.

Cettina's actions have a drastic effect on Augusto, who bankrupts the family funeral home business, Torellhonor, bringing some of his relatives from Northern Italy to Rome to take over the business. Meanwhile, Melina Catapano, the Martinis' new au pair and Cettina's cousin, has her eye on Augusto. Cettina, who has since started working for the competition at Zinco Brothers Funeral Service (played by Italian comic duo Lillo & Greg), returns to Rome with Eros to win back Augusto's love and save Torellhonor.

Ciccio, who is still dating Miranda Biglietti, starts working at the Indian restaurant behind his grandparents' back, although they eventually allow him to work there.

Maria returns to Rome from Africa, where Guido is still working with Doctors Without Borders, but is hiding her presence to her family and is staying at her friend Reby's house. After Reby’s boyfriend tries to sexually assault her, Maria leaves the flat and ends her friendship with Reby, who didn’t believe her only for the truth to come out bringing the two friends to reconciliation. Maria also begins to work as a waitress at the restaurant and later as a paramedic while continuing to work on her thesis with Oscar's help and becomes friends with Sarita. However, Maria carries a pain within her — the sense of guilt over having had to choose between two children, and giving the only medicine left to the one with the greatest chance of survival, thus condemning the other to die. Maria will be able to confess this burden to her family only after a long time and a lot of pressure from her grandparents who see her visibly upset to the point that Maria had started to practice extreme sports and abusing alcohol, worrying Alberto and Ciccio.

Sarita and Emilio's relationship ends his previous engagement to Alba and is temporarily opposed by Kabir. Annuccia and Sumede discover that the man who showed up claiming to be Sarita's betrothed is an impostor and a penniless actor. The two track down the real betrothed, who, just like Sarita, have already found love and have no intention of honouring the arranged marriage. Sarita and Emilio can finally be together.

=== Season 6 ===
Dr. Lele Martini is now in his 50s, and he is a well respected Professor at the Sorbonne University in the field of environmental medicine. He and Alice are now divorced, and they share custody of their nine-years-old twins: Libero Junior, nicknamed Bobò, and Elena. It's late summer, and Lele and the twins are about to return to Italy to attend the wedding of Ciccio and Miranda. Grandpa Libero is no longer the mayor of Poggio Fiorito, and has inherited a farmhouse in Apulia, where Ciccio plans to work together with Miranda, Aunt Nilde, Andrea and his cousin Lele Jr. This project can also be achieved thanks to the financial support of Grandma Enrica and Lele. Miranda, however, leaves Ciccio at the altar, also ruining the plans for the Apulian farmhouse.

Giulio Pittaluga returns to Italy after his volunteer work in Africa. Following his father's footsteps, he reopens the famous Pittaluga chocolate shop, getting into debt up to his neck. His sister Bianca from Holland comes to his rescue when Giulio is undergoing emergency surgery. She was in love with Lele when they were teenagers, despite he had given her the nickname Barilotto because she was overweight. Lele initially does not recognize her, but the two begin to hang out even though she is engaged to a Dutch lawyer, Hans. Bianca's daughter, Ynge, immediately becomes friends with peers Elena and Bobò.

Lele decides to stay in Italy, to the dismay of Elena (who would like to return to her life in Paris) and the happiness of Bobò in order to take the reins of the family, and relieve Grandpa Libero from taking care of his family and for once, look after his older sister Nilde, who Lele acknowledge was always put second to him by their father. The grandparents then move to Apulia to help Nilde and Andrea with the farmhouse while Ciccio falls into a destructive depressive spiral from which he will recover only after meeting Trasy, a Romany girl and a horse trainer at the local riding school.

Annuccia is now a teenager, and she is often bickering with younger half-sister Elena due to her jealousy over the fact that Elena was raised by their dad whilst Annuccia was left behind as he started his new life with his second wife. Maria, on the other hand, is studying to become a child neuropsychiatrist and is expecting Guido's child. They are about to leave the household to move into the apartment where the Martinis lived before moving to Poggio Fiorito and which they are renovating. However, the current tenant, Dante Piccione, does not intend to leave. Unbeknownst to Maria and Guido, Dante and their au pair Melina are dating.

Meanwhile, Lele starts working at the polyclinic founded by Guido alongside his former colleagues psychiatrist Oscar Nobili, his partner and paediatrician Max Cavilli, and Tea Molinari, who put aside her career as romance novelist and went back working as a midwife and physiotherapist. Working under Lele's department is interns Fanny and Davide. Fanny falls in love with Lele, and the two have a relationship, creating a love triangle since Lele also has reciprocated feelings for Bianca.

Ave Battiston, Guido's biological mother who abandoned him as a newborn, tracks him down in Rome and tries to become part of his life by regularly visiting the clinic. When Guido discovers her identity, he wants nothing to do with Ave and rudely kicks her out. The situation changes with the birth of his and Maria's daughter, and Guido and Ave finally get to know each other and develop a wonderful mother-son relationship. Although Guido has found his mother, he loses his wife. Following the childbirth, Maria has become distant and cold with Guido and when he has a moment of weakness with a woman who stalks him, Maria and Guido separate. They eventually reconcile and celebrate their seventh anniversary with a camper trip as they had planned.

When Grandma Enrica and Grandpa Libero discover that their marriage documents were not valid, they decide to take action by remarrying, not after a few moments of drama. The marriage, officiated by Lele, also includes the marriage of Ciccio and Trasy. Lele, after breaking up with Fanny, asks Bianca to marry him. Giulio finds out that his ex-girlfriend Irma is pregnant, and they, too, decide to start their own family.

The sixth series sees Cettina's final exit from the programme in a special episode. Initially, Cettina is believed to be dead after she was reported missing at sea following a shipwreck. However, Cettina often appears in Grandpa Libero's dreams, advising him on everyday problems. In the end, it is discovered that Cettina has survived and has become a rich entrepreneur in the culinary world in the United States, but has lost her memory and initially does not recognize the Martinis when she meets them by chance in Rome. With the help of her family, she regains her memory and leaves for Brescia to reunite with her beloved Augusto and Eros.

=== Season 7 ===
Three years have passed since Guido Zanin died in a car accident (which occurred off-screen between seasons 6 and 7). Maria tries to move on, raising her daughter Palù with the help of the large Martini family. Ave Battiston struggles to accept her son's death even though she tries to hide it so as not to add pain to that of her daughter-in-law and granddaughter.

Maria meets Marco Levi, a journalist, and the father of one of Palù's schoolmates, Jonathan. They often disagree and tease each other whenever they meet outside their children's school. Maria would like to deepen her relationship with Marco, but she is still suffering from the death of her husband. To complicate matters, she has a flirting relationship with her colleague, Francesco.

Alberto, after being fired, moved back to Rome, where he falls in love with Albina, Guido's sister, who is visiting the Martini house to be close to Ave. This puts an end to the relationship between Alberto and Reby, who, having discovered the affair, takes refuge in Francesco's arms. Alberto and Albina decide to move to Apulia to work at Nilde's farmhouse.

Ciccio and Trasy have relationship problems. Ciccio would like to have children, but Trasy prefers to continue working as a jockey, and a pregnancy would put her career on hold. Annuccia, who is now fifteen, faces the ups and downs of her teenage years and is taking Maria and Ciccio's role from previous seasons in her relationship with the pre-teens Elena and Bobò.

Lele asks Bianca to marry him again, but she is not yet divorced from her first husband, Gus, who has no intention of signing the divorce papers. Gus wants to win Bianca back and raise Ynge together. Lele thus starts a relationship with Virginia, a former colleague from the Sorbonne. However, these stories end shortly, and Bianca and Lele get back together so much so that they hire Giulio as a wedding planner despite their better judgment.

Melina, Bianca, and Trasy discover that they are all pregnant. The latter is carrying twins while Melina and Dante organize their wedding at the same time as Lele and Bianca's.

Ave and Erica purchase the house next door to the Martinis' once owned by Cettina and Augusto, who now live in Brescia. The house takes the name "Casa delle Nonne," from which Ave and Enrica run their businesses. Enrica sells Puglia DOP products, specializing in food products from the Martinis' Puglian farm. Ave opens her own tailoring shop. The grandmothers' antics are further sparked by the arrival of Donato, a charming bachelor, who casts his eyes on Ave.

Marco has to go to Frankfurt for work with his son and ex-wife. Palù convinces Maria to join them at the airport — where they arrive late anyway — in the middle of the preparations for Lele and Bianca's wedding in a mountain chalet together with friends and relatives. During the trip, the group is forced to take refuge in a farmhouse, and Lele gets lost during a snowfall. Maria is joined by Marco during the wedding, and the two declare their love for each other.

The episode ends with the cast dancing a waltz to the famous Italian song, "Parlami d'amore, Mariù" (Tell me about love, Mariù), dedicated to Carlo Bixio, the creator of the series, who died during the production of the seventh season.

=== Season 8 ===
The eighth season is set a few months after the end of the previous one. The viewers are welcomed by Grandpa Libero, who, breaking the fourth wall, summarizes the previous episodes.

Granpda Libero returned from the United States to resume his role as patriarch of the Martini family. The already large family is about to expand with the arrival of new babies; Ciccio and Trasy's twins, Melina and Dante's baby girl, and Bianca and Lele's baby boy. Unfortunately, Marco and Maria's engagement announcement is marred by the discovery that the Poggio Fiorito residential neighborhood is the result of a building scam and they are all at risk of losing their homes if they don't pay the very expensive fine for the crime in which they were unwittingly complicit.

Entrepreneur and architect Fulvio Magnani offers to buy the entire neighbourhood with the intention of razing it to the ground and building a luxury country club. Magnani's son, Roberto, is an old schoolmate of Maria's. Their chemistry puts her engagement to Marco at risk. Maria is also having problems at work. Guenda Pacifico (who is in a relationship with Gus, Bianca's ex-husband) and Tiziano Corradi, the new owners of Villa Aurora, the polyclinic where Lele and Oscar also work, want to transform the clinic into a private medical center.

The Martini family gets busy collecting the money requested by the bank. Bianca agrees to host a pastry television programme with her famous and distant mother, Gemma, with the help of Giulio and his partner Irma, a television producer. Ave, on the other hand, begins a job parallel to that of a seamstress, sewing counterfeit clothes and getting into trouble with the law. This is how she crosses paths with Armando, a colonel of the Guardia di Finanza.

Roberto offers Maria an apartment to use as a doctor's office when she loses her job and their relationship becomes increasingly close. Maria discovers that Marco has been lying to her about his job. Instead of being in Brussels, he is in Somalia, filming a story in war zones and areas affected by famine. Marco's ex, Micol, takes advantage of this and tries to obtain custody of Jonathan, accusing Marco of not being a present father. However, when Roberto offers her a job in London, Micol leaves immediately, regardless of Jonathan, who remains with his father exclusively. Gus and a doctors' strike convince Guenda to change her mind about the medical center, and Maria returns to work at Villa Aurora.

Annuccia announces that she wants to be called Anna now and begins a relationship with Emiliano, a tattoo artist who saved her from an attack by some thugs in a bad area during one of her deliveries as a rider. Emiliano, however, is involved in criminal activities against his will, and he tries to keep Anna at a distance.

The Martinis continue to fight to keep their home, but Magnani has made it almost a personal vendetta. When Maria gets back together with Marco (who in the meantime has gotten a job in New York), Roberto allies himself with his father, but both are stopped and arrested by Armando when scams in their business emerge. Marco and Maria are then free to marry, and the Martinis save their family home. The icing on the cake is the birth of Carlo Martini, Lele's sixth child.

=== Season 9 ===
A year later, the Martini's house has been emptied of many of its familiar faces. Lele and Bianca moved to Paris with Carlo, Ynge, and Gus. Dante and Melina relocated to Sulmona, Abruzzi, with their daughter; Anna is doing a cultural exchange in London. Libero and Enrica have returned to Rome permanently, managing the Puglia DOP trade together with Ave while Nilde and her family remained in Apulia.

Two relatives come to live at the Martini house. The first is Sara Levi, Marco's sister and a famous competitive runner who is headed to Rome for her wedding. The second is Lorenzo Martini, Lele's cousin and Libero's nephew. He is a surgeon with a somatic symptom disorder forcing him out of the operating room. Lorenzo seizes the opportunity to come to Rome to reconnect with his ex-wife Veronica and his fifteen-year-old son, Tommy. Ironically, Lorenzo and Sara are on the same plane, and this meeting makes Sara decide not to get married. Despite blossoming romantic feelings between Sara and Lorenzo, Sara dates Stefano, who helps her open a bar where the Pittaluga chocolate shop used to be. Sara suffers from a death-threatening congenital heart defect, and it is Lorenzo who saves her life by operating on her urgently. He conquered his traumatic experience with Dr. Oscar Nobili's help.

Love problems are in the air, even for the youngest. Tommy is torn between Elena and Giada, an Albanian girl that Maria has taken into foster care by taking her off the streets. Giada came to Italy illegally to look for her little brother and eventually decided to live with the family that adopted him after having tracked him down with Maria's help, moving to Udine.

Anna, on the other hand, is dating Kevin in London behind Emiliano's back, and Emiliano starts taking drugs again, especially after discovering the tryst. When Kevin pays Anna a surprise visit in Rome, the boys discover the truth, and both dump Anna. This pushes Anna to want to go back with Emiliano and help him get help through drug rehabilitation.

Maria discovers she is pregnant with twins. In the meantime, she and Marco get excellent job prospects in Turin and decide to move there with their children and Ave.

=== Season 10 ===
The tenth season begins in Apulia during the summer holidays. Grandpa Libero is entrusted to take care of Maddalena, a sheltered and very devoted woman who will start working as an au pair at the Martini house. Back in Poggio Fiorito, Valerio Petrucci asks for information about Elena Martini, unaware that the woman died about fifteen years earlier. He was led to the neighbourhood due to mistaking the woman with namesake Elena, the daughter of Lele and Alice. Vittorio becomes familiar with Anna through Geko, a musician that Anna befriends through her new passion for a career in the world of music after failing the entrance exam for medicine. Vittorio reveals that he was Elena's lover and is Anna's biological father. This creates a deep rift between Anna and Lele, but also between her and Grandapa Libero, none of whom knew about it. Although Anna keeps in touch by e-mail with Maria and Ciccio, none of her siblings are physically close to her with the exception of the twins Elena and Bobò, who are too young to help her. Meanwhile, Anna looks for Emiliano, who now works at a centre for recovering drug addicts and is having a relationship with a colleague, Ginevra. Anna, upset, starts dating Geko.

Elena dates schoolmate Tito, who suffers from a heart condition and is undergoing surgery at Villa Aurora. Tommy, instead, dates Margot, an older girl with a shared passion for graffiti and troubles. Tommy is also attracted to Agnese, Oscar's daughter, who returns to Rome to live with her father. The girl has a crush on the Latin teacher, Nicola Gardini. The man is gay and starts a relationship with Oscar, who in the meantime comes out to Agnese. She is supportive of her father, but is angry for not having been told before.

Maddalena also starts dating Augusto, a plumber she met at the Martini house during some renovation work. The woman is reluctant to let herself go because her ex-husband cheated on her and left during their honeymoon, causing Maddalena to reject men and love. The two will end up getting married.

Sara and Lorenzo are now married and are looking for a house to live in and welcome their unborn child. Their family idyll is ruined by a one-night stand between Sara and Andrea, who in addition to taking care of the renovations of their future home is also the father of Paolo, Bobò's best friend, who comes out with Lele's support. Lorenzo is courted by his colleague, Dr. Celeste Di Maio. Sara and Lorenzo separate, and she begins to work as a coach for the school team of the school attended by the young Martinis. After various ups and downs, including a fight between Marco and Lorenzo, Sara and Lorenzo get back together.

The series ends with Anna making peace with Lele and Grandpa Libero, who she considers her real family even though she continues to see Valerio. After breaking up with Geko, Anna gets back with Emiliano. Bianca and Carletto arrive from Paris, and the whole family celebrates the New Year in the street in front of the house that has seen countless intergenerational adventures of the Martini family and their friends.

== Cast and characters ==
=== Martini family ===
Actor	Character	Seasons									
Actor	Character	1	2	3	4	5	6	7	8	9	10
Giulio Scarpati	Dr. Gabriele "Lele" Martini	Main	Main	Guest	Guest		Main	Main	Main		Main
Lino Banfi	Libero Martini	Main	Main	Main	Main	Main	Main		Main	Main	Main
Lunetta Savino	Concetta "Cettina" Gargiulo	Main	Main	Main	Main	Main	Guest				
Margot Sikabonyi	Maria Martini	Main	Main	Main	Main	Main	Main	Main	Main	Main	
Michael Cadeddu	Francesco "Ciccio" Martini	Main	Main	Main	Main	Main	Main	Main	Guest		Guest
Eleonora Cadeddu	Anna "Annuccia" Martini	Main	Main	Main	Main	Main	Main	Main	Main	Main	Main
Milena Vukotic	Enrica Solari	Recurring	Main	Main	Main	Main	Main	Main	Main	Main	Main
Riccardo Garrone	Nicola Solari	Recurring			Guest						
Claudia Pandolfi	Alice Solari	Main	Main								
Anita Zagaria	Nilde Martini	Main	Main	Main	Main	Main	Main	Main			
Manuele Labate	Alberto Foschi	Main	Main	Main	Main	Main		Main			
Domiziana Giovinazzo	Elena Martini						Main	Main	Main	Main	Main
Gabriele Paolino	Libero Jr. "Bobò" Martini						Main	Main	Main	Main	Main
Flavio Prenti	Dr. Lorenzo Martini									Main	Main
Riccardo Alemanni	Tommaso Martini									Main	Main

- Giulio Scarpati (s. 1–2, 6–8, 10; guest s. 3–4) as Gabriele "Lele" Martini, a widower physician who works in an experimental local Community Health Center (ASL).
- Lino Banfi (s. 1–6, 8–10) as Libero Martini, a retired railway worker with left-leaning ideals who lives with his son and helps him to take care of his children. He has Apulian origins.
- Lunetta Savino (s. 1–5; guest s. 6) as Concetta "Cettina" Gargiulo, a flamboyant maid from Southern Italy who works in Martini's house, is soon considered like a mother by Lele's children. She's devoted to the Lady of Carmel and an amateur opera singer.
- Margot Sikabonyi (s. 1–9) as Maria Martini, Lele's older daughter who studies medicine and then becomes a physician herself. She's 13 years old at the beginning of the series.
- Michael Cadeddu (s. 1–7; guest s. 8 and 10) as Francesco "Ciccio" Martin, Lele's only son. He's 8 years old at the beginning of the first season.
- Eleonora Cadeddu (s. 1–10) as Anna "Annuccia" Martini, Lele's younger daughter. She's just 3 years old at the beginning of the first season.
- Milena Vukotic (s. 1–10) as Enrica Morelli, Lele's rich and snooty mother-in-law who frequently argues with Libero on how to raise their nephews, although she ends up with marry Libero after her first husband Nicola escapes with a young woman.
- Riccardo Garrone (s. 1; guest s. 4) as Nicola Solari, Lele's father-in-law.
- Claudia Pandolfi (s.1–2) as Alice Solari, Lele's first wife's sister, who works on a local radio and falls in love with his brother-in-law.
- Anita Zagaria (s. 1–7) as Nilde Martini, Lele's sister, who runs a restaurant.
- Manuele Labate (s. 1–7) as Alberto Foschi, Nilde's only son who lives with his uncle while her parents are divorcing. He's 16 years old at the beginning of the first season.
- Domiziana Giovanizzo and Gabriele Paolino (s. 6–10) as Elena and Libero Jr. "Boboò" Martini, the twins born after Lele and Alice's marriage. They make their first apparition on season 6, aged 8.
- Flavio Parenti (s. 9–10) as Lorenzo Martini, Lele's cousin who works as a surgeon. He makes his first apparition on season 9.
- Riccardo Alemanni (s. 9–10) as Tommaso Martini, Lorenzo's only son. He's aged 15 at the beginning of season 9.

=== ASL medical personnel ===
Actor	Character	Seasons									
Actor	Character	1	2	3	4	5	6	7	8	9	10
Paolo Sassanelli	Dr. Oscar Nobili	Main	Main	Main	Main	Main	Main	Main	Main	Main	Main
Rosanna Banfi	Dorotea "Tea" Lizzani	Main	Main	Main	Main	Main	Main		Main	Main	Main
Sabrina Paravicini	Jessica Pieri	Main	Main	Main	Main						
Vincenzo Crocitti	Dr. Mariano Valenti	Main	Main	Main	Main	Main					
Jonis Bascir	Jonis Muheddin	Main	Main	Main	Main	Main					
Mauro Pirovano	Dr. Giorgio Giorgi	Main	Main								
Pietro Sermonti	Dr. Guido Zanin			Main	Main		Main				
David Sebasti	Dr. Emilio Villari					Main					
Alessandro D'Ambrosi	Davide Orsini						Main	Main	Main	Main	

=== Others ===
Actor	Character	Seasons									
Actor	Character	1	2	3	4	5	6	7	8	9	10
Enrico Brignano	Giacinto Diotaiuti	Main	Main								
Ugo Dighero	Giulio Pittalunga	Main	Guest				Main	Main	Main		
Francesco Salvi	Augusto Torello			Main	Main	Main					
Beatrice Fazi	Carmela "Melina" Catapano					Main	Main	Main	Main		
Francesca Cavallin	Bianca Pittalunga						Main	Main	Main		Guest
Emanuela Grimalda	Ave Battiston						Main	Main	Main	Main	
Giorgio Marchesi	Marco Levi							Main	Main	Main	Guest
Edoardo Purgatori	Emiliano Lupi								Main	Main	Main
Valentina Corti	Sara Levi									Main	Main

- Enrico Brignano (s. 1–2) as Giacinto Diotaiuti, Cettina's first boyfriend, who works as a private security guard. In series 3, he breaks up with Cettina and escapes in Calabria, where he marries another woman.
- Ugo Dighero (s. 1, 6–8; guest s. 2) as Giulio Pittalunga, commonly called "Uncle Giulio", Lele's best friend.
- Francesco Salvi (s. 3–5) as Augusto Torello, Cettina's boyfriend and then-husband. He works as a funeral entrepreneur. Native of the Northern city of Brescia, he's a stingy and histrionic hard worker.
- Beatrice Fazi (s. 5–8) as Carmela "Melina" Catapano, Cettina's cousin. She takes her place as maid once Cettina moves to northern Italy in season 6.

== Production ==
During the second half of the 1990s, the Bixio family's production company Publispei purchased the format of the Spanish series Médico de familia. The Italian adaptation was conceived and developed by producer Carlo Bixio and RAI. The authors of the story of the series were Paola Pascolini and Tommaso Capolicchio. The direction of the various episodes of the first season were alternated between Riccardo Donna and Anna Di Francisca. The main actors of the series were: Giulio Scarpati in the role of the head of the family Lele, Lino Banfi in the role of the grandfather Libero, Claudia Pandolfi in the role of Alice, Lele's sister-in-law, Lunetta Savino in the role of the domestic worker Cettina and Milena Vukotic in the role of Enrica, Lele's mother-in-law.

Initially, Fabrizio Frizzi was the first candidate for the role of Lele, but he declined due to his already numerous television commitments. Luca Barbarossa was also offered the role of the protagonist of the series, but he did not accept because he did not consider himself suited to the profession of actor.

In an interview with TV Sorrisi e Canzoni Scarpati revealed how he was initially reluctant to accept the role due to the enormous length of filming (fourteen months), but that he changed his mind after he came across an episode of the Spanish series in Venezuela and, thinking it was a sign of destiny, he accepted the role. . Banfi, for his part, accepted for the opportunity to try his hand at a role that was completely different from the ones he had played in the 1970s and 1980s. Furthermore, some actors had initially been selected for roles different from those they would have played: this is the case of Ugo Dighero initially chosen to play Giacinto, Cettina's boyfriend, a role then given to a young Enrico Brignano.

The series featured the debut of little Eleonora Cadeddu, who was chosen for the role of Annuccia when she was only two and a half years old. The little girl's debut was completely unexpected and casual, since her mother took her with her to audition only for Michael Cadeddu, Eleonora's brother both on the set and in real life; the casting directors were struck by the little girl's spontaneity and therefore decided to cast both siblings.

Filming began in February 1998 and continued until spring 1999 for a total of 52 episodes. The reason for such a large number of episodes was due to the fact that the series was initially conceived to be broadcast in day-time (morning-afternoon), but then the director of Raiuno decided to schedule it in prime time on Sunday. The location used was Teatro 20 in Cinecittà for the main shooting. The first season debuted on Rai Uno on December 6, 1998 and aired for 26 consecutive weeks, ending on May 30, 1999: it achieved increasing success from episode to episode, closing with 11 million viewers in the grand finale. Filming for the second season began just two weeks after the first season concluded airing: the cast remained almost entirely unchanged, and aired between the winter and spring of 2000.

In 2000, after the conclusion of the second season, Giulio Scarpati and Claudia Pandolfi both decided to leave the series, despite repeated requests from the public and the producers to continue with their roles. Their departure put the production of the series on hold, given the uncertainty about how it would be possible to continue the plot without the two characters who had been the most important until then. Only in 2003 did the TV series return to air, with Lino Banfi promoted to the main character, several changes in the composition of the series' regular cast, including the entry of Pietro Sermonti as the new family doctor, and a more sweetened and less transgressive synopsis compared to the first two seasons. Despite the changes and the absence of the two historical protagonists, the series maintained its success unchanged.

In the two-year period 2003-2004, with the unreleased broadcast of the third and fourth seasons of Un medico in famiglia, there was the consecration as national-popular faces of Margot Sikabonyi (present since the beginning of the series) and Pietro Sermonti (a new entry of the third season). The love story of their two characters, Maria and Guido, has made them the most beloved television couple ever by the public, even as the years have passed, surpassing the couple made up of Lele and Alice in terms of iconicity and popularity.

After the end of the fifth season, in the fall of 2007, Scarpati decided to return to the series to play the role of Lele, who would therefore become the protagonist again. Claudia Pandolfi was also contacted several times for the same reason. Given her clear and categorical refusal, the Bixios hypothesized to include the character of Alice in the plot anyway, assigning it to another actress. Then, instead, it was decided to create the character of Bianca.

Between 2008 and 2009, the various stages of production of the sixth season of the series took place, a season particularly anticipated by the public due to the return of Giulio Scarpati, Pietro Sermonti and Ugo Dighero as members of the regular cast. Furthermore, it was announced that this season the two eight-year-old twins, played by Domiziana Giovinazzo and Gabriele Paolino, would also arrive in Rome. The other most important new entries were Francesca Cavallin in the role of Bianca and Caterina Misasi in the role of Fanny, that is, the two female characters who would lead the sentimental storyline concerning Lele. Lino Banfi, after having played the role of Libero Martini for five consecutive seasons without ever missing an episode, announced that he would only be present for part of the new season.

The sixth season premiered in the fall of 2009 and was intended to be the series' final season. In fact, producer Carlo Bixio said that the sixth season was "the one destined to close a cycle'. In the weekly programme ApriRai announcing programmes on RAI channels, the voice-over of Cinzia De Ponti announced that the "sixth and final season" of the TV series was about to begin. Even Lunetta Savino, a beloved member of the main cast from the first to the fifth season, declared that she had accepted to participate as a guest star in the sixth season only because it was supposed to be the last season of the TV series. However, given the exceptional audience results, already at the end of November 2009, it was announced that the series would continue with the seventh season ahead of the sixth season finale.

Both Lino Banfi and Pietro Sermonti decided not to participate in any way, not even with a cameo, in the filming of the seventh season. To justify their absences, the production decided to kill off the character of Guido since Sermonti's choice to abandon the TV series was final and irrevocable. It was also decided to transfer grandfather Libero abroad (as had already happened previously with the character of Lele) without killing him since it was believed that Banfi could change his mind in the future.

At the end of February 2011, while on the first channel it was airing Cugino & Cugino and there was anticipation for the seventh season of Un medico in famiglia, the producer Carlo Bixio died suddenly due to an illness. A few weeks later, the seventh season was officially presented by Giulio Scarpati, the other actors and the directors, and was dedicated to the historical producer of the series who had recently passed away. In the opening credits of season seven, Carlo Bixio was credited for the last time as a producer.

Since 2013, with the eighth season, the series has been produced by Verdiana Bixio , who the previous year had become president of Publispei, succeeding her father Carlo.

The eighth season marked the return to the cast of Lino Banfi in the role of Libero, but the character was present only for a part of the episodes, as already happened in the sixth season. The eighth season was also characterized by the participation of Al Bano as a guest star and by a record number of children present at the Martini house, although with a reduced weight in the narrative economy of the season, which focuses mainly on the events of the adult members of the Martini family.

During the airing of the eighth season, the production of the ninth season was started, but both Francesca Cavallin and Giulio Scarpati decided not to participate. In 2014, the ninth season of the series was broadcast on Rai 1 with the usual format of twenty-six episodes distributed over thirteen evenings, format that had been adopted for all seasons except the first. Given the absence of Scarpati, Lino Banfi returned to be the lead protagonist for all the episodes of the ninth season, and Flavio Parenti joined the main cast in the role of a new family doctor, Lorenzo Martini.

The following year, the tenth season was put into production, in which Giulio Scarpati returned as a permanent character in the role of Lele. but the abandonment of Margot Sikabonyi was recorded, who decided to give up the role of Maria Martini after having participated in all nine previous seasons, although not in all the episodes.

=== Cancellation ===
After the conclusion of the tenth season, some newspapers had spread the news of the imminent production of the eleventh season. However, the eleventh season never came to fruition and the series ended without any official statement explaining the reasons.

=== Revival ===
In March 2023, Lino Banfi declared that the idea of making a TV miniseries of two or three episodes was on the table to give a definitive conclusion to the events of the fiction. In August of the same year, producer Verdiana Bixio of Publispei also confirmed the hypothesis of putting Un medico in famiglia back into production.

In March 2024, as a guest at the Milazzo Film Festival, actor Lino Banfi returned to talk about a possible creation of new episodes, stating that the character of grandfather Libero could soon return to TV.

=== Format and aspect ratio ===
From the first to the fifth season, the series was filmed in the traditional 4:3 format. The sixth season was filmed in 14:9, an intermediate format between 4:3 and 16:9, widely used in Italian TV in the 2000s. From the seventh to the tenth season, however, the series was filmed in the widescreen 16:9 format and in high definition.

Un medico in famiglia is the last Italian television drama in the 4:3 format, since the fifth season is dated 2007. The television series I Cesaroni, produced by the same production company as Un medico in famiglia, adopted the widescreen 16:9 format since its first season, dated 2006.

== Controversies ==
In early 2007, while waiting for the broadcasting of the fifth season, it was learned that the homosexual character Oscar Nobili would have a romantic relationship with a man (something that had never been shown in the series before and only slightly alluded to), the new character Max Cavilli. Christian or conservative newspapers harshly criticized the fiction: at the time, in fact, there was a great debate in public opinion and in parliament regarding LGBT rights in Italy. Until the end of the season, it was not possible to confirm whether or not there was a kissing scene between the two characters, but in the end, no such scene was shown.

In 2016, with the airing of episode seventeen of the tenth season, there was for the first and only time a kissing scene between two gay men: Oscar Nobili and Nicola Gardini .

=== Shortened Episodes ===
The Italian programme Striscia la notizia pointed out that in the first episode of the first season (La casa nuova) heavy censorship was carried out to eliminate any reference to the story of Sandra, a girl who had just turned eighteen and got pregnant after a casual relationship, and was tormented in deciding whether to have an abortion or not. The first episode was broadcast for the first time on 6 December 1998 but, in all the various subsequent reruns, it was always broadcast in a censored version, lasting only forty minutes. In the television passages on the pay channels of RaiSat, the episode was instead broadcast in rerun in the integral version of about fifty-five minutes. However, when in 2009, the RaiSat channels became free, the first episode was censored again. In the subsequent episodes, the character of Sandra participates again, and her story is difficult to understand for those who have seen the first episode in the censored version. To date, on RaiPlay, the first episode is only available in the censored version, while on Netflix and Prime Video, it is available in the integral version.

Some cuts were also made in the ninth episode of the first season (Quarantaquattro gatti) which, unlike the first episode, is available on RaiPlay in the integral version, while on Prime Video it was uploaded in a reduced version. In the reduced version, the scenes of a poker game organized clandestinely by Giulio were eliminated, during which Libero starts to mock the speak patterns of a stuttering player.
