= The Holy Boy (film) =

2025 film by Paolo Strippoli

- Italian theatrical release poster
- Italian: La valle dei sorrisi
- Directed by: Paolo Strippoli
- Written by: Jacopo Del Giudice; Paolo Strippoli; Milo Tissone
- Produced by: Laura Paolucci; Ines Vasiljević; Stefano Sardo; Domenico Procacci; Jožko Rutar; Miha Černec
- Starring: Michele Riondino; Giulio Feltri; Paolo Pierobon; Romana Maggiora Vergano
- Cinematography: Cristiano Di Nicola
- Edited by: Federico Palmerini
- Music by: Federico Bisozzi; Davide Tomat
- Production companies: Fandango; Nightswim; Spok Films; Vision Distribution
- Distributed by: Vision Distribution
- Release dates: 30 August 2025 (Venice); 17 September 2025 (Italy)
- Running time: 122 minutes
- Countries: Italy; Slovenia
- Language: Italian

The Holy Boy (Italian: La valle dei sorrisi, lit. 'The Valley of Smiles') is a 2025 folk horror film co-written and directed by Paolo Strippoli. The film had its world premiere out of competition at the 82nd Venice International Film Festival on 30 August 2025. It received a theatrical release in Italy on 17 September 2025.

== Plot ==
Sergio is a physical education teacher and former national judo champion who is transferred to Remis, a remote village nestled in the Alps. Haunted by a bereavement that has driven him into a spiral of alcohol and grief, he soon discovers that an almost surreal serenity reigns in the town. At school, Sergio treats his students with indifference and becomes acquainted with one of them, the taciturn Matteo Corbin. Meanwhile, he meets Michela, who works at the village bar, and one evening she invites him to a mysterious nocturnal ritual: once a week, the entire community gathers to embrace Matteo one by one, as he possesses the extraordinary ability to free people from pain and anguish simply by hugging them. Subjected to Matteo's embrace, Sergio experiences a vision of his deceased son and, once the ritual is over, no longer feels any pain. Although he cannot explain how this is possible, his mood improves: he introduces his students to judo and begins a relationship with Michela.

In the meantime, he gets to know Matteo better. Because of his power, Matteo lives a life unlike that of his peers: every day he is forced to receive villagers waiting for the ritual, while everything is managed by his father Mauro, who takes care of him. Sergio befriends the boy and encourages him to live his own life and gain independence. This relationship begins to alarm the townspeople, especially Mauro and the parish priest, Father Attilio, who insist that Matteo continue performing the ritual for the villagers, who otherwise suffer from a form of withdrawal manifested by persistent itching.

One evening, Sergio is attacked outside his home by a masked man, but is saved by Pichler, a neighbor. Meanwhile, Matteo becomes increasingly irritable and more frequently refuses to perform the ritual, lapsing into states of trance during which he is able to control the people of the village. Through this ability, he succeeds in controlling Lorenzo, a classmate to whom he is secretly attracted. His relationship with Sergio also deteriorates, as the latter becomes increasingly suspicious of the boy, who does not want to lose the only true friendship he has.

Matteo's darker side ultimately takes over when, while once again in a trance, he compels Lorenzo to burn himself alive during an Instagram livestream. Horrified by what he has done, Matteo runs away from home and seeks refuge with Sergio, who hides him before Mauro and Father Attilio arrive. Mauro reveals to Sergio that Matteo is not his biological son, but an infant he found while assisting in the aftermath of a train accident. Reluctantly, Sergio hands Matteo over to him, and the boy is sedated and taken to the chapel. During the journey, however, they are stopped by Pichler, who intends to kill Matteo; before he can do so, he is killed by Father Attilio. At the chapel, the community of Remis has by now descended into collective madness. When the ritual begins, the villagers swarm Matteo in an uncontrolled collective embrace, draining him of all his life energy and leaving him in a grotesque, catatonic state. The townspeople then rise, now possessed by Matteo. Father Attilio shoots Mauro before taking his own life with a rifle.

Sergio is then confronted by Michela, who is also under Matteo's control and attempts to attack him. Possessed by Matteo, she kills herself by severing an artery in her leg. Sergio finds Mauro, who has survived the shooting. Together they go to Remis's abandoned railway station, where Sergio and Matteo used to meet and spend time together, and discover the possessed townspeople keeping watch over the boy's monstrous body. Mauro decides to kill Matteo once and for all in order to end the curse, attempting to strangle him. However, Sergio relives the memory of his hanged son yet again and, unable to bear the pain, chooses to save Matteo from suffocation by stabbing Mauro to death. In a tragic ending, Matteo, still controlling the villagers, uses them to embrace Sergio, once again artificially relieving him of his grief.

== Cast ==
- Michele Riondino as Sergio Rossetti
- Giulio Feltri as Matteo Corbin
- Paolo Pierobon as Mauro Corbin
- Romana Maggiora Vergano as Michela
- Sergio Romano as Pichler
- Anna Bellato as Anna
- Sandra Toffolatti as Elisabetta Gengo
- Gabriele Benedetti as Franco
- Diego Nardini as Lorenzo
- Roberto Citran as Father Attilio

== Production ==
The film was shot in several towns of Friuli-Venezia Giulia, including Sappada.

== Release ==
Fandango Sales acquired the international sales rights to the film in July 2025. The film had its world premiere out of competition at the 82nd Venice International Film Festival on 30 August 2025. It was also screened at the BFI London Film Festival. It received a theatrical release in Italy on 17 September 2025. Shudder acquired rights for North America, UK and Ireland.

== Reception ==
On the review aggregator website Rotten Tomatoes, 91% of 11 critics' reviews are positive.
