= Leonardo World =

- Country: Italy

Ownership
- Owner: Gruppo Sitcom

History
- Launched: 2005
- Closed: 2008

Leonardo World was a television network, dedicated to Italian communities abroad, and owned by the Italian company Gruppo Sitcom. Its content was about economics, culture, territory, politics, innovation and technology.

Its TV programs included the best format from Gruppo Sitcom channels: Alice, Leonardo, Marcopolo & Nuvolari. Main topics are: food and wine, fashion, style, trends, design, Italian territory, and art.

TV programs were broadcast in Italian, Spanish and English.

Leonardo World was launched in several countries: United States, Canada, South America, Australia, Japan, China, Korea, Taiwan, Vietnam, Hong Kong, Malaysia.
