= Roberto De Feo =

Italian film director and screenwriter

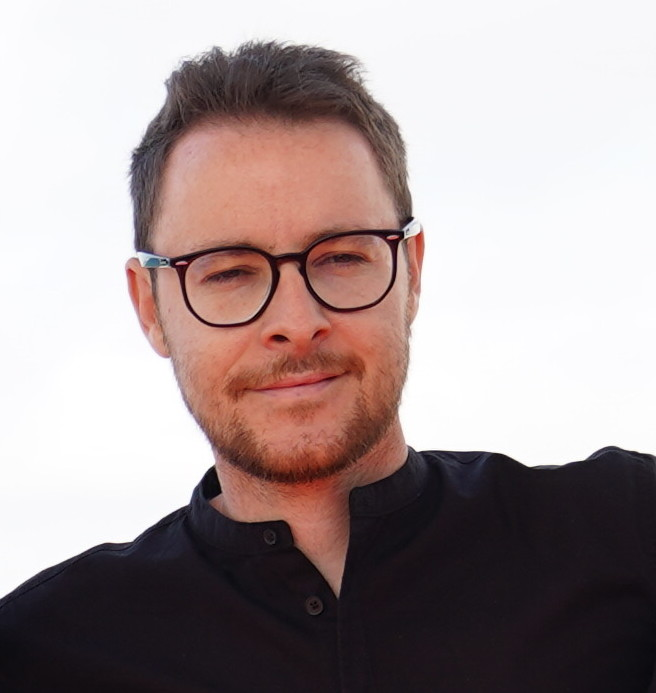
- Born: 8 August 1981 (age 44); Bari, Italy
- Occupations: Film director, screenwriter
- Years active: 2008–present

Roberto De Feo (born 8 August 1981) is an Italian film director and screenwriter best known for directing the horror films The Nest (2019) and A Classic Horror Story (2021).

== Career ==
De Feo made his feature directorial debut with The Nest, which premiered in the Piazza Grande section of the Locarno Film Festival in 2019. The film received a nomination for the Nastro d'Argento for Best New Director. Following its Italian release, the film was sold to distributors in several international territories including the United Kingdom, France, Spain, Japan, Russia and Brazil.

In 2021 he co-wrote and co-directed A Classic Horror Story with Paolo Strippoli. Produced by Colorado Film, the film was released worldwide by Netflix. It received a nomination for David di Donatello for Best Visual Effects. In July 2021, The New York Times included the film among five recommended horror films available for streaming.

In 2023, De Feo co-authored the horror novel L'innocenza del buio with Lucio Besana, published by Sperling & Kupfer.

== Filmography ==
| Year | Title | Credited as | Notes |
|---|---|---|---|
| 2019 | The Nest | Director; screenwriter | Feature film |
| 2021 | A Classic Horror Story | Co-director; co-screenwriter | With Paolo Strippoli |
