= List of awards and nominations received by Paolo Sorrentino =

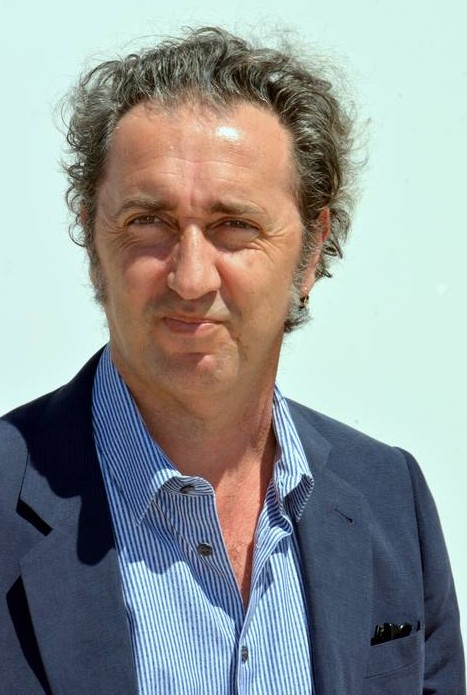
Sorrentino in the Cannes Film Festival in 2017

Paolo Sorrentino is an Italian film director.

He has accepted an Academy Award for Best International Feature Film for The Great Beauty (2013). Another of his movies,The Hand of God (2021), was nominated as well for the same Oscar category. He has received numerous accolades including BAFTA Award two Cannes Film Festival prizes, four Venice Film Festival Awards and four European Film Awards. In Italy he was honoured with eight David di Donatello and six Nastro d'Argento.

== Major associations ==
=== Academy Awards ===
Year	Category	Nominated work	Result	Ref.
2014	Best International Feature Film	The Great Beauty	Won	
2022	Best International Feature Film	The Hand of God	Nominated	

=== BAFTA Awards ===
Year	Category	Nominated work	Result	Ref.
2014	Best Film not in the English Language	The Great Beauty	Won	

=== César Awards ===
Year	Category	Nominated work	Result	Ref.
2014	Best Foreign Language Film	The Great Beauty	Nominated	
2016	Best Foreign Language Film	Youth	Nominated	

=== Golden Globe Awards ===
Year	Category	Nominated work	Result	Ref.
2014	Foreign Language Film	The Great Beauty	Won	
2022	Foreign Language Film	The Hand of God	Nominated	

=== Nastro d'Argento ===
Year	Category	Nominated work	Result	Ref.
2002	Best New Director	One Man Up	Won	
2002	Best Screenplay	One Man Up	Nominated	
2005	Best Director	The Consequences of Love	Nominated	
2005	Best Original Story	The Consequences of Love	Nominated	
2007	Best Original Story	The Family Friend	Nominated	
2009	Best Director	Il Divo	Won	
2009	Best Screenplay	Il Divo	Won	
2012	Best Director	This Must Be the Place	Won	
2012	Best Screenplay	This Must Be the Place	Nominated	
2013	Best Director	The Great Beauty	Nominated	
2013	Best Screenplay	The Great Beauty	Nominated	
2015	Best Director	Youth	Won	
2015	Best Script	Youth	Nominated	
2018	Best Film	Loro	Nominated	
2018	Best Director	Loro	Nominated	
2018	Best Screenplay	Loro	Won	
2022	Best Film	È stata la mano di Dio	Won	
2022	Best Director	È stata la mano di Dio	Nominated	
2022	Best Screenplay	È stata la mano di Dio	Nominated	
2025	Best Film	Parthenope	Nominated	
2025	Best Director	Parthenope	Nominated	
2025	Best Screenplay	Parthenope	Nominated	
2026	Best Film	La grazia	Won	
2026	Best Director	La grazia	Won	
2026	Best Screenplay	La grazia	Won	

== Industry awards ==
=== British Independent Film Awards ===
Year	Category	Nominated work	Result	Ref.
2014	Best Foreign Independent Film	The Great Beauty	Nominated	

=== Critics' Choice Awards ===
Year	Category	Nominated work	Result	Ref.
2014	Best Foreign Language Film	The Great Beauty	Nominated	

=== David di Donatello ===
Year	Category	Nominated work	Result	Ref.
2002	Best New Director	One Man Up	Nominated	
2002	Best Screenplay	One Man Up	Nominated	
2005	Best Director	The Consequences of Love	Won	
2005	Best Screenplay	The Consequences of Love	Won	
2005	Best Film	The Consequences of Love	Won	
2009	Best Director	Il Divo	Nominated	
2009	Best Screenplay	Il Divo	Nominated	
2009	Best Film	Il Divo	Nominated	
2012	Best Director	This Must Be the Place	Nominated	
2012	Best Screenplay	This Must Be the Place	Won	
2012	Best Film	This Must Be the Place	Nominated	
2014	David of the Youth	The Great Beauty	Nominated	
2014	Best Director	The Great Beauty	Won	
2014	Best Screenplay	The Great Beauty	Nominated	
2014	Best Film	The Great Beauty	Nominated	
2016	Best Director	Youth	Nominated	
2016	Best Screenplay	Youth	Nominated	
2016	Best Film	Youth	Nominated	
2022	Best Director	The Hand of God	Won	
2022	Best Screenplay	The Hand of God	Nominated	
2022	Best Producer	The Hand of God	Nominated	
2022	Best Film	The Hand of God	Won	
2022	Young David Award	The Hand of God	Won	
2025	Best Director	Parthenope	Nominated	
2025	Best Original Screenplay	Parthenope	Nominated	
2025	Best Film	Parthenope	Nominated	
2026	Best Director	La grazia	Nominated	
2026	Best Screenplay	La grazia	Nominated	
2026	Best Producer	La grazia	Nominated	
2026	Best Film	La grazia	Nominated	
2026	Young David Award	La grazia	Nominated	

=== European Film Awards ===
Year	Category	Nominated work	Result	Ref.
2005	Best Director	The Consequences of Love	Nominated	
2008	Best Director	Il Divo	Nominated	
2008	Best Screenwriter	Il Divo	Nominated	
2013	Best Film	The Great Beauty	Won	
2013	Best Director	The Great Beauty	Won	
2013	Best Screenwriter	The Great Beauty	Nominated	
2015	Best Film	Youth	Won	
2015	Best Director	Youth	Won	
2015	Best Screenwriter	Youth	Nominated	
2021	Best Film	The Hand of God	Nominated	
2021	Best Screenwriter	The Hand of God	Nominated	
2021	Best Director	The Hand of God	Nominated	
2026	Best Screenwriter	La grazia	Nominated	

=== Gotham Awards ===
Year	Category	Nominated work	Result	Ref.
2019	Breakthrough Series - Longform	L'amica geniale	Nominated	

=== Independent Spirit Awards ===
Year	Category	Nominated work	Result	Ref.
2014	Best Foreign Film	The Great Beauty	Nominated	

== Festival awards ==
Association	Year	Category	Nominated work	Result
Bellaria Film Festival	2002	Best Film	One Man Up	Won
Bellaria Film Festival	2002	Best Technical Contribution	One Man Up	Won
Bangkok International Film Festival	2006	Best Film	The Consequences of Love	Nominated
BFI London Film Festival	2021	Best Film	The Hand of God	Nominated
Buenos Aires International Festival	2002	Best Film	One Man Up	Nominated
Buenos Aires International Festival	2002	Youth Jury Award	One Man Up	Won
Cannes Film Festival	2004	Palme d'Or	The Consequences of Love	Nominated
Cannes Film Festival	2006	Palme d'Or	The Family Friend	Nominated
Cannes Film Festival	2008	Palme d'Or	Il Divo	Nominated
Cannes Film Festival	2008	Jury Prize	Il Divo	Won
Cannes Film Festival	2011	Palme d'Or	This Must Be the Place	Nominated
Cannes Film Festival	2011	Prize of the Ecumenical Jury	This Must Be the Place	Won
Cannes Film Festival	2013	Palme d'Or	The Great Beauty	Nominated
Cannes Film Festival	2015	Palme d'Or	Youth	Nominated
Capri Hollywood International Film Festival	2013	Capri Visionary Award	The Great Beauty	Won
Capri Hollywood International Film Festival	2021	Best Director	The Hand of God	Won
Chicago International Film Festival	2006	Best Feature	The Family Friend	Nominated
Chicago International Film Festival	2025	Best Feature	La grazia	Nominated
Chicago International Film Festival	2025	Best Screenplay	La grazia	Won
Cinemanila International Film Festival	2014	Best Foreign-Language Film	The Great Beauty	Won
Cinemanila International Film Festival	2013	Lino Brocka Award for Best Film	The Great Beauty	Won
Dresden Film Festival	2010	Best Short Fiction Film - International	La Partita Lenta	Nominated
Dublin International Film Festival	2009	Achievement Award	Himself	Won
Florida Film Critics Circle Awards	2013	Best Foreign Language Film	The Great Beauty	Nominated
Karlovy Vary International Film Festival	2015	Audience Award	Youth	Won
Munich International Film Festival	2013	Best International Film	The Great Beauty	Nominated
London Critics Circle Film Awards	2014	Director of the Year	The Great Beauty	Nominated
Los Angeles Film Critics Association	2013	Best Foreign Language Film	The Great Beauty	Nominated
Ostend Film Festival	2015	Look Prize	Youth	Nominated
Raindance Film Festival	2009	Film of the Festival	La Partita Lenta	Won
Salerno Shadowline Film Festival	2014	Best Film	One Man Up	Won
Sarajevo Film Festival	2025	Honorary Heart of Sarajevo Award	Lifetime achievement	Honored
Seville European Film Festival	2008	Eurimages Award	Il Divo	Won
Seville European Film Festival	2013	Best Co-Production	The Great Beauty	Won
Seville European Film Festival	2013	Asecan Award (Special Mention)	The Great Beauty	Won
Tallinn Black Nights Film Festival	2006	Grand Prize	The Family Friend	Nominated
Tallinn Black Nights Film Festival	2008	Grand Prize	Il Divo	Nominated
Tallinn Black Nights Film Festival	2013	Grand Prize	The Great Beauty	Won
Torino Film Festival	1998	Best Italian Fiction Film	L'amore non ha confini	Nominated
Torino Film Festival	2001	Himself	Giuseppe De Santis Award	Won
Tribeca Film Festival	2002	Best Narrative Feature	One Man Up	Nominated
Venice Film Festival	2008	SIAE Award	Il Divo	Won
Venice Film Festival	2016	SIAE Award	The Young Pope	Won
Venice Film Festival	2016	Fondazione Mimmo Rotella Award	The Young Pope	Won
Venice Film Festival	2021	Golden Lion	The Hand of God	Nominated
Venice Film Festival	2021	Grand Jury Prize	The Hand of God	Won
Venice Film Festival	2025	Golden Lion	La grazia	Nominated
Venice Film Festival	2025	Brian Award	La grazia	Won
Zurich Film Festival	2021	Lifetime Achievement	Tribute to...Award	Won

== Critics awards ==
Association	Year	Category	Nominated work	Result
Association of Polish Filmmakers Critics Awards	2014	Best Foreign Film	The Great Beauty	Won
Association of Polish Filmmakers Critics Awards	2015	Best Foreign Film	Youth	Won
Boston Society of Film Critics Awards	2013	Best Foreign Language Film	The Great Beauty	Won
Detroit Film Critics Society	2015	Best Director	Youth	Nominated
Detroit Film Critics Society	2015	Best Film	Youth	Nominated
Florida Film Critics Circle Awards	2013	Best Foreign-Language Film	The Great Beauty	Nominated
Globo d'oro	2005	Best Screenplay	The Consequences of Love	Won
Globo d'oro	2009	Best Director	Il Divo	Nominated
Globo d'oro	2009	Best Screenplay	Il Divo	Won
Globo d'oro	2013	Best Director	The Great Beauty	Nominated
Globo d'oro	2026	Best Film	La grazia	Nominated
Hollywood Film Awards	2013	Best International Film	The Great Beauty	Won
Hollywood Film Awards	2013	Best Independent Film	The Great Beauty	Won
Hollywood Film Awards	2013	Best New Screenplay	The Great Beauty	Won
International Cinephile Society Awards	2014	Best Film	The Great Beauty	Nominated
International Cinephile Society Awards	2014	Best Foreign Film	The Great Beauty	Nominated
Cinema Brazil Grand Prize	2014	Best Foreign-Language Film	The Great Beauty	Nominated
London Critics Circle Film Awards	2014	Director of the Year	The Great Beauty	Nominated
London Critics Circle Film Awards	2014	Best Foreign Language Film	The Great Beauty	Nominated
Los Angeles Film Critics Association	2013	Best Foreign Film	The Great Beauty	Nominated
La Pellicola d'Oro	2026	Best Film	Parthenope	Won
Premio Flaiano	2012	Best Film Director	This Must Be the Place	Won
Seattle Film Critics Society	2014	Best Foreign-Language Film	The Great Beauty	Nominated

== Miscellaneous associations ==
Association	Year	Category	Nominated work	Result
Amanda Awards	2014	Best Film - International	The Great Beauty	Won
ASECAN Awards	2017	Best Foreign Film	Youth	Nominated
Bodil Awards	2010	Best Non-American Film	Il Divo	Nominated
Bodil Awards	2014	Best Non-American Film	The Great Beauty	Nominated
FICE Awards	2005	Best Italian Film	The Consequences of Love	Won
FICE Awards	2012	Best Italian Film	This Must Be the Place	Won
FICE Awards	2012	Best Foreign Language Film	This Must Be the Place	Won
Gold Derby Awards	2014	Best Foreign Language Film	The Great Beauty	Nominated
Goya Awards	2014	Best European Film	The Great Beauty	Nominated
Kineo Awards	2017	Best Film	This Must Be the Place	Nominated
L'Association des Critiques de Séries	2017	Best Direction	The Young Pope	Nominated
Polish Film Awards	2015	Best European Film	The Great Beauty	Nominated
Polish Film Awards	2016	Best European Film	Youth	Won
Prêmio Guarani	2014	Best Foreign Film	The Great Beauty	Won
Robert Awards	2014	Best Non-American Film	The Great Beauty	Nominated
Robert Awards	2017	Best Non-American Film	Youth	Nominated
Sant Jordi Awards	2014	Best Foreign Film	The Great Beauty	Won
Satellite Awards	2014	Best Foreign Film	The Great Beauty	Nominated
Turia Awards	2014	Best Foreign Film	The Great Beauty	Won
