= David di Donatello for Best Actor =

Annual Italian film award

David di Donatello Award for Best Actor
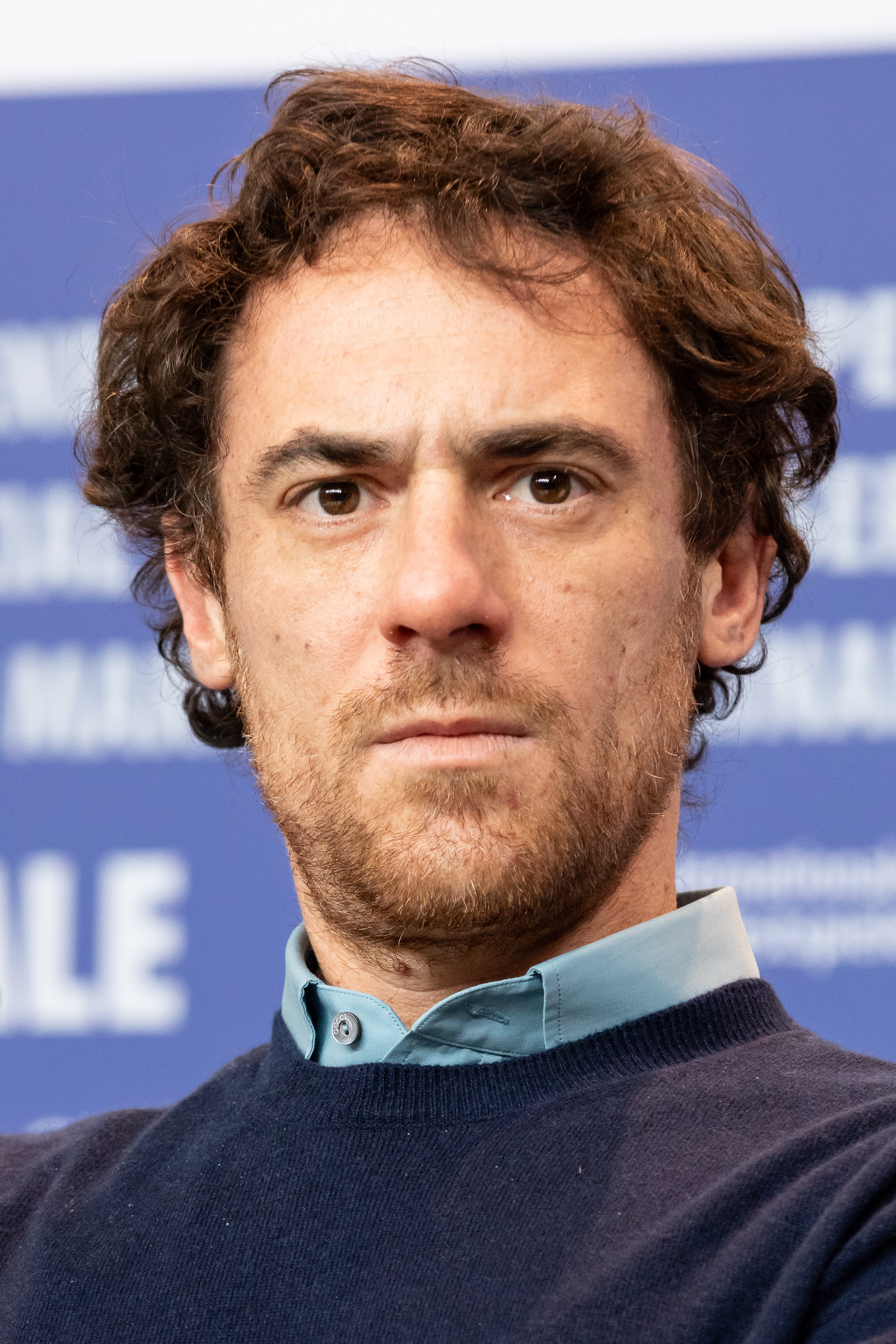
- Elio Germano is the current recipient of the award (2024)
- Country: Italy
- Presented by: Accademia del Cinema Italiano
- First award: 1956 (for lead acting in films released during the 1955/1956 film season)
- Currently held by: Elio Germano — The Great Ambition (2024)
- Website: daviddidonatello.it

The David di Donatello Award for Best Actor (Italian: David di Donatello per il miglior attore protagonista) is a film award presented annually by the Accademia del Cinema Italiano (ACI, Academy of Italian Cinema) to recognize the outstanding performance in a leading role of a male actor in an Italian film released during the year preceding the ceremony. The award was first given in 1956, and became competitive in 1981.

Vittorio Gassman and Alberto Sordi are the record holders in this category with seven awards each, followed by Marcello Mastroianni and Elio Germano with five.

Nominees and winners are selected via runoff voting by all the members of the Accademia.

== Winners and nominees ==
Below, winners are listed first in the colored row, followed by other nominees.

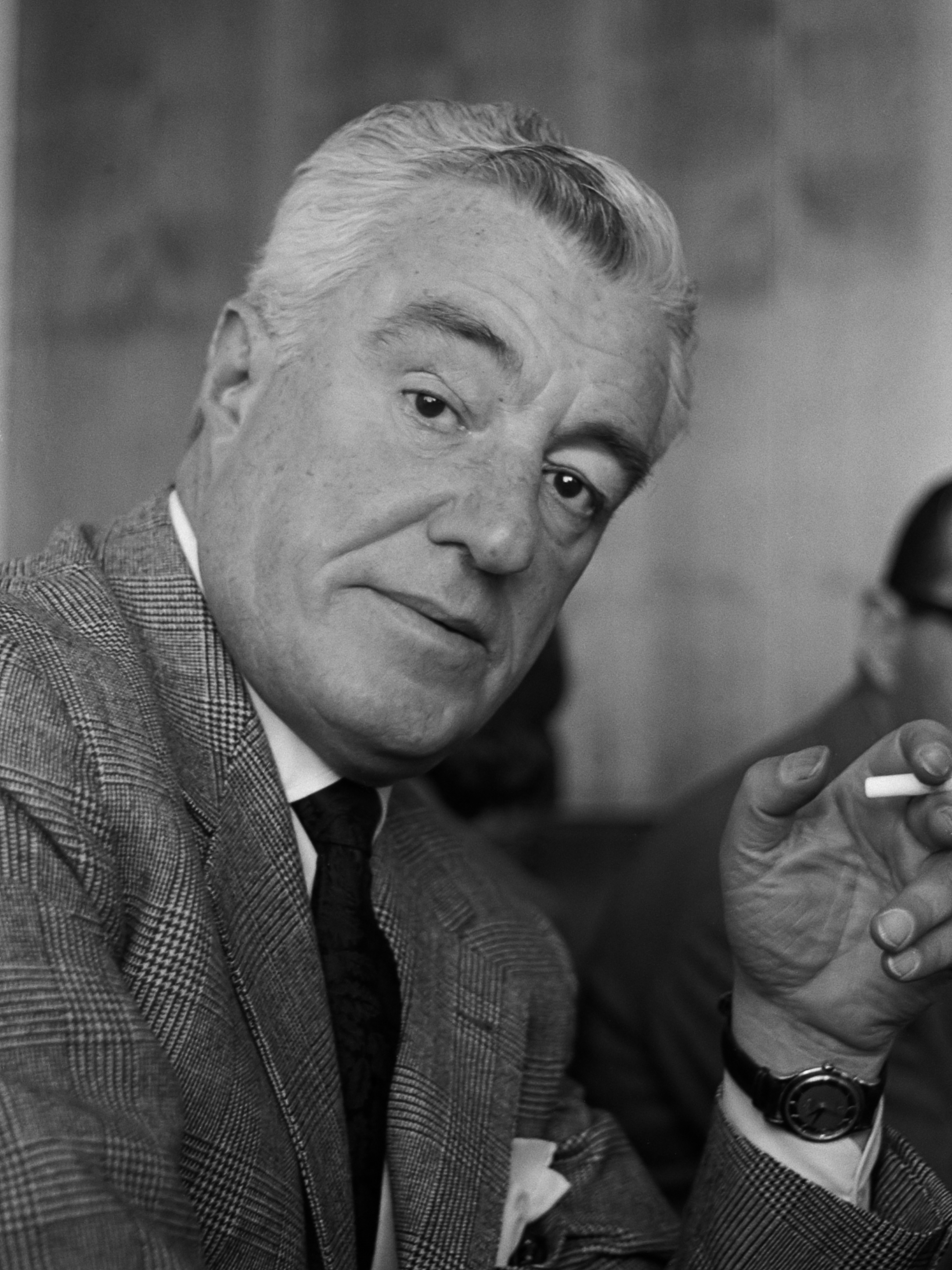
Vittorio De Sica was the first winner in the category for his role in Scandal in Sorrento (1955).

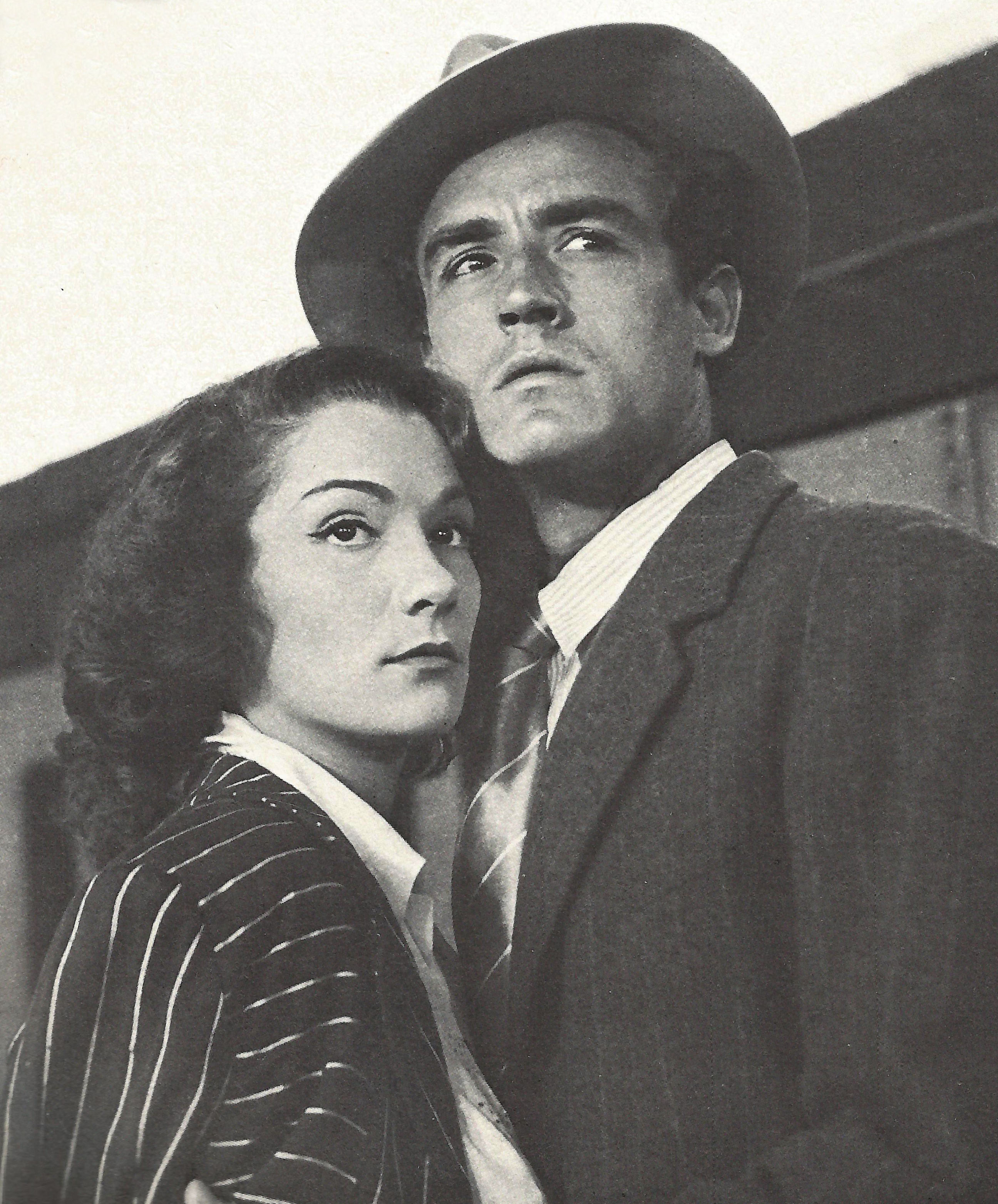
Vittorio Gassman (right) is one of the only two actors to win the award seven times, from The Great War (1959) to The Family (1987).

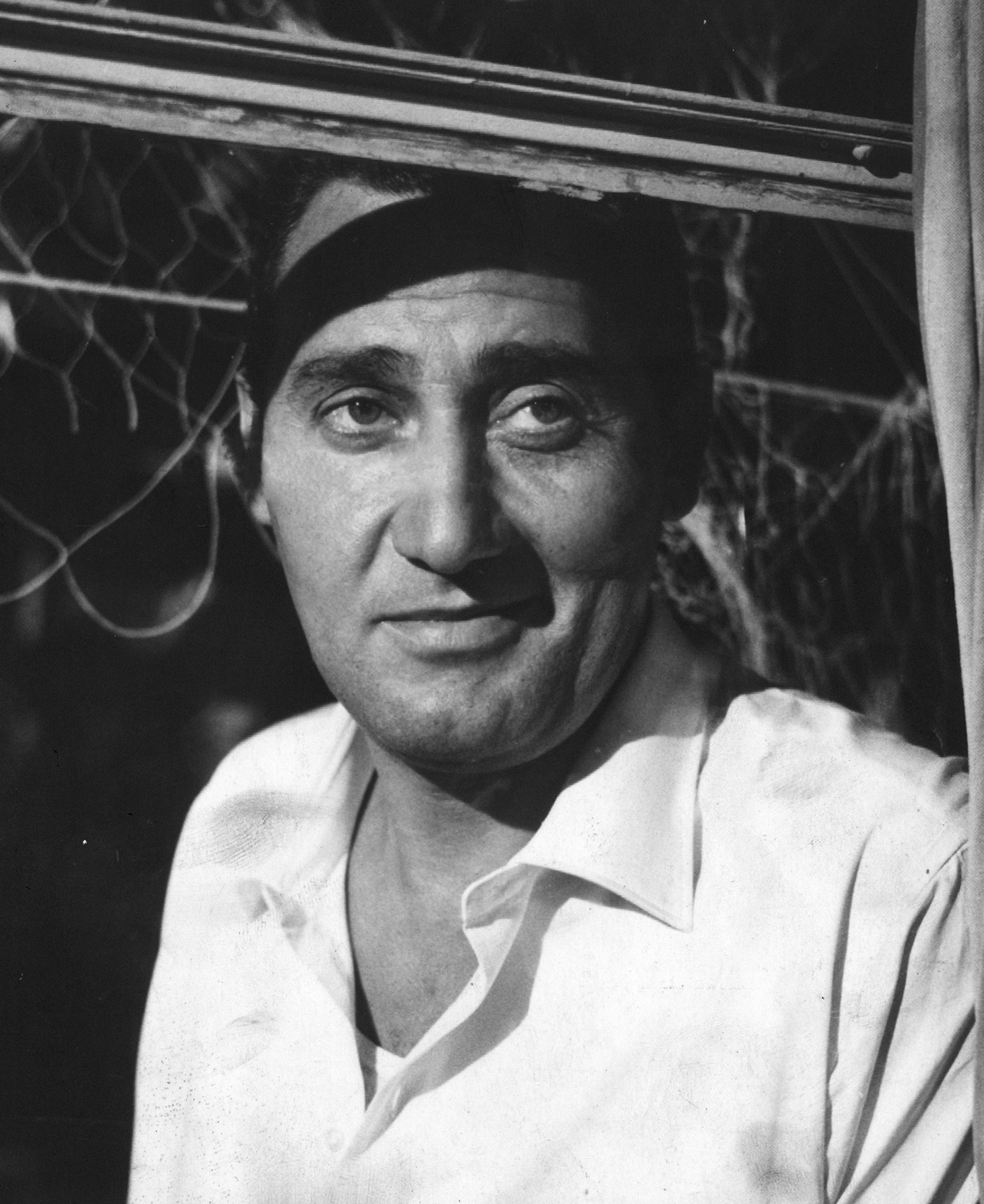
Alberto Sordi won the award seven times out of eight nominations, one of the only two actors to achieve so, winning for his roles in films from The Great War (1959) to An Average Little Man (1977).

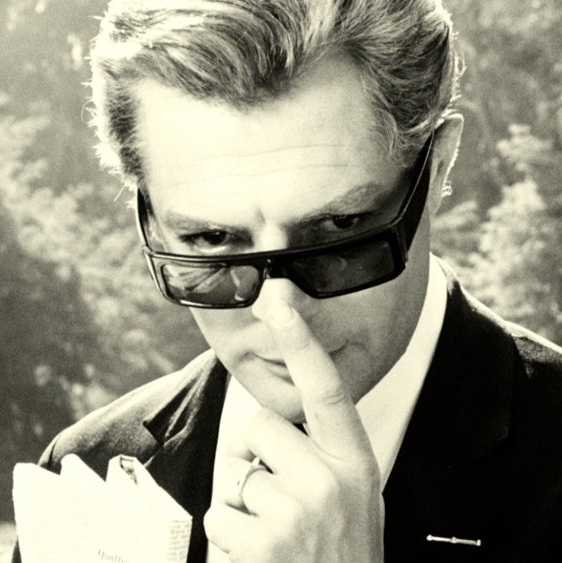
Marcello Mastroianni won the award five times out of six nominations, the first time for his multiple roles in Yesterday, Today and Tomorrow (1963).

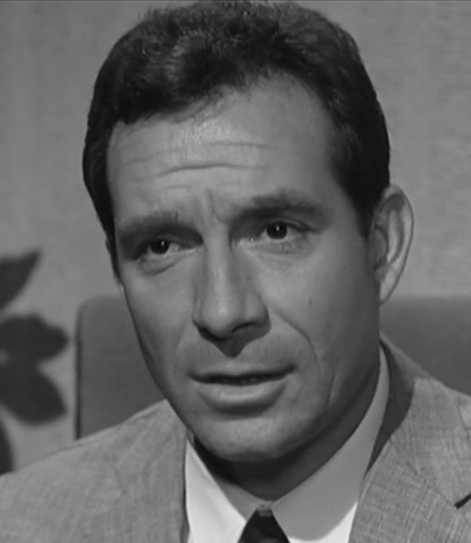
Ugo Tognazzi won the award three times, for his roles in The Climax (1967), Lady Caliph (1970), and My Friends (1975).

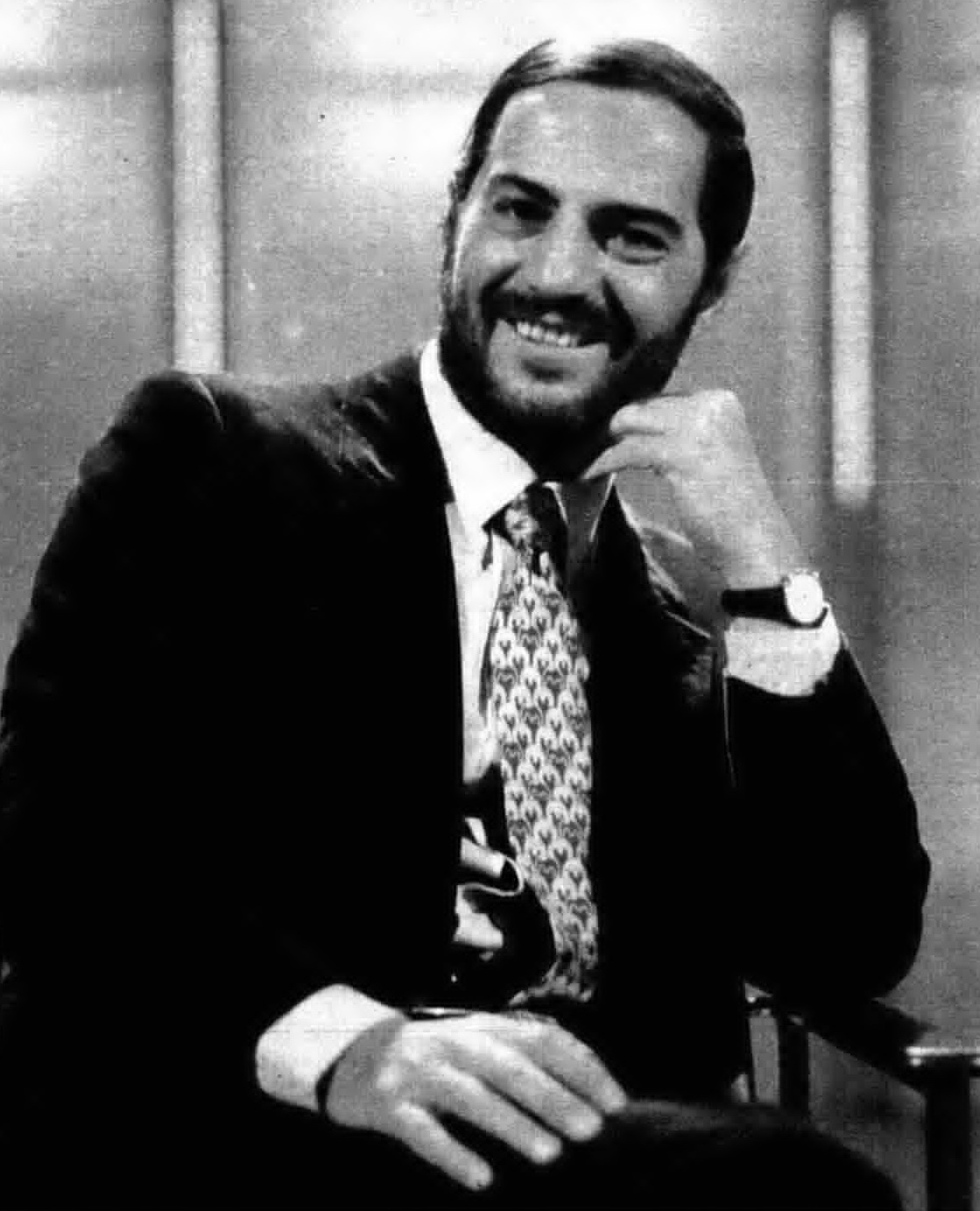
Nino Manfredi won the award four times from 1969 to 1978, for his roles in I See Naked (1968), The Conspirators (1969), Bread and Chocolate (1973) and In the Name of the Pope King (1977).

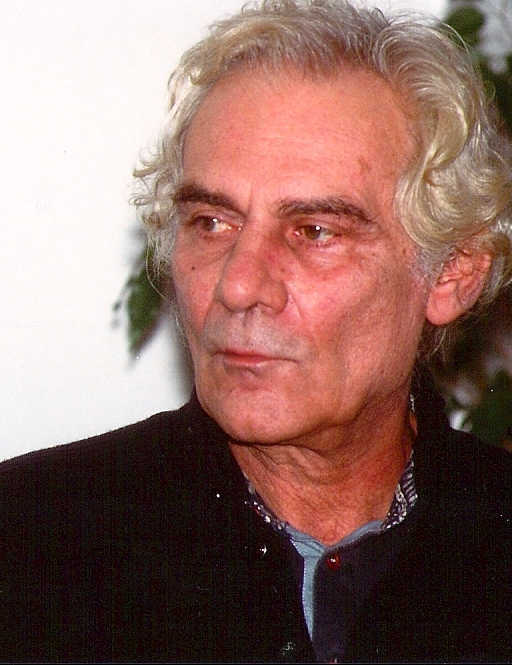
Gian Maria Volonté won twice for his roles in Investigation of a Citizen Above Suspicion (1970) and Open Doors (1990), being nominated four times.

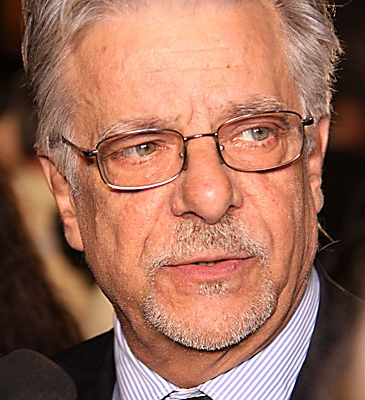
Giancarlo Giannini won the award four times out of seven nominations, from 1971 for The Seduction of Mimi to 2001 for I Love You Eugenio.

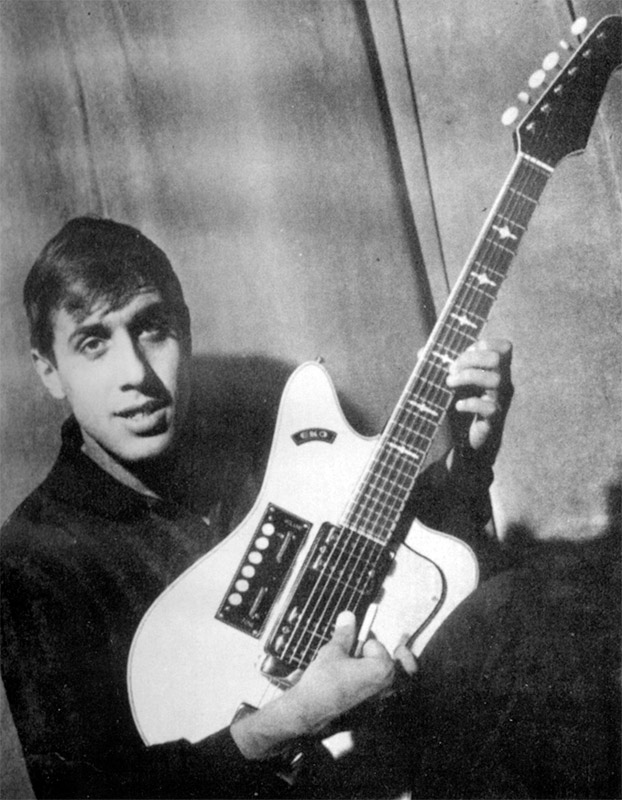
Singer and entertainer Adriano Celentano won twice from 1976 to 1980.

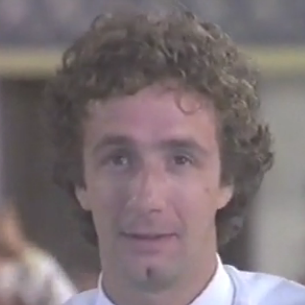
Francesco Nuti won twice for the same role, in The Pool Hustlers (1982) and Casablanca, Casablanca (1985).

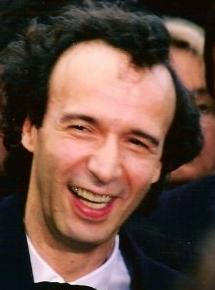
Roberto Benigni won the award for his roles in The Little Devil (1989) and Life Is Beautiful (1997), which also earned him the Academy Award for Best Actor.

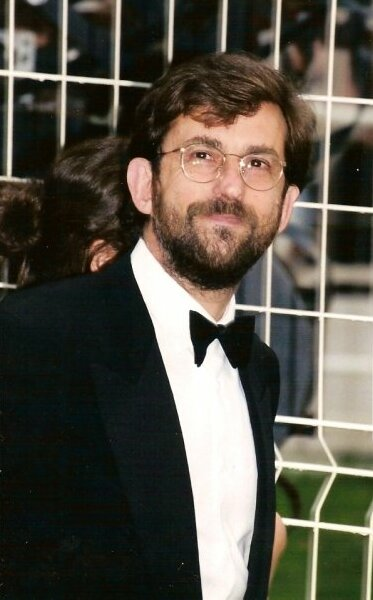
Nanni Moretti won only once out of eight nominations, for his role in The Yes Man (1991).

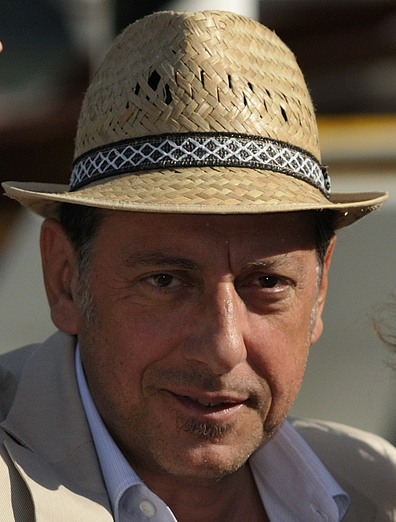
Sergio Castellitto won the award twice for his roles in The Great Pumpkin (1992) and Don't Move (2004), being nominated six times.

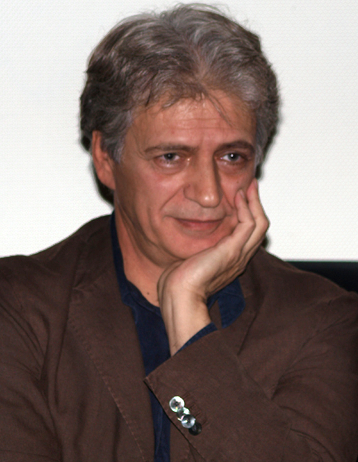
Fabrizio Bentivoglio won only once out of six nominations, for his role in An Eyewitness Account (1996).

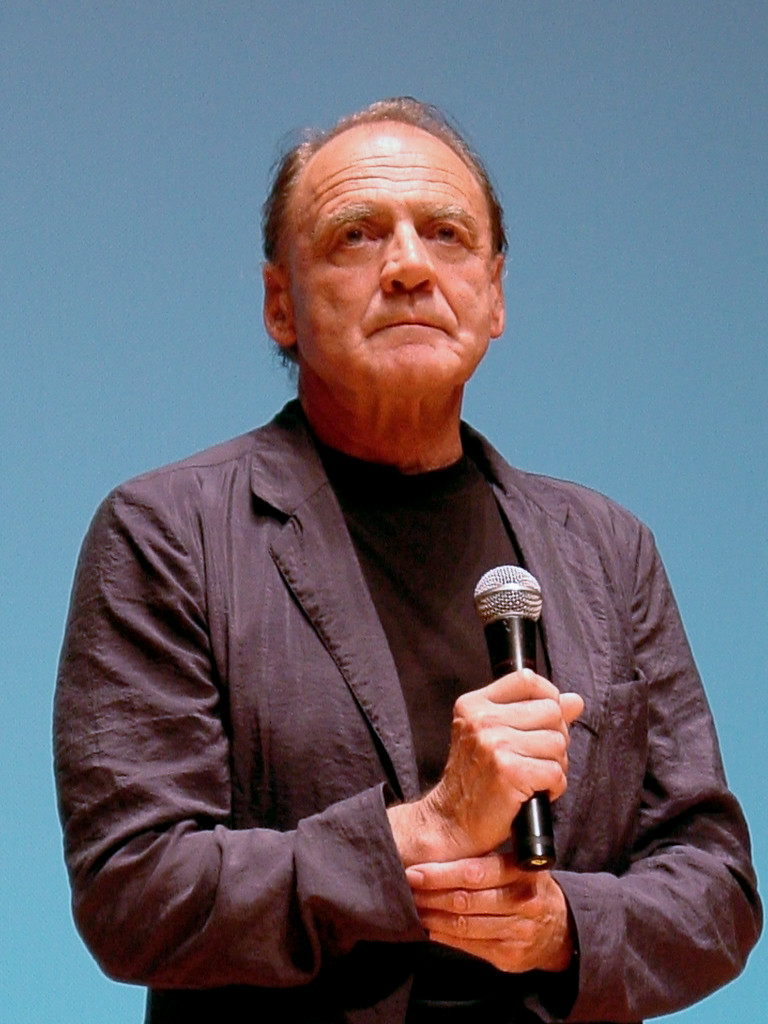
Bruno Ganz won the award in 2000 for his role in Bread and Tulips, the first foreign actor to achieve so.

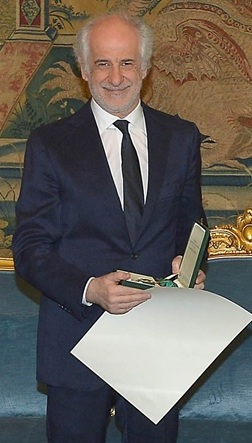
Toni Servillo won the award four times out of eight nominations, for The Consequences of Love (2004), The Girl by the Lake (2007), Il Divo (2008), and The Great Beauty (2013).

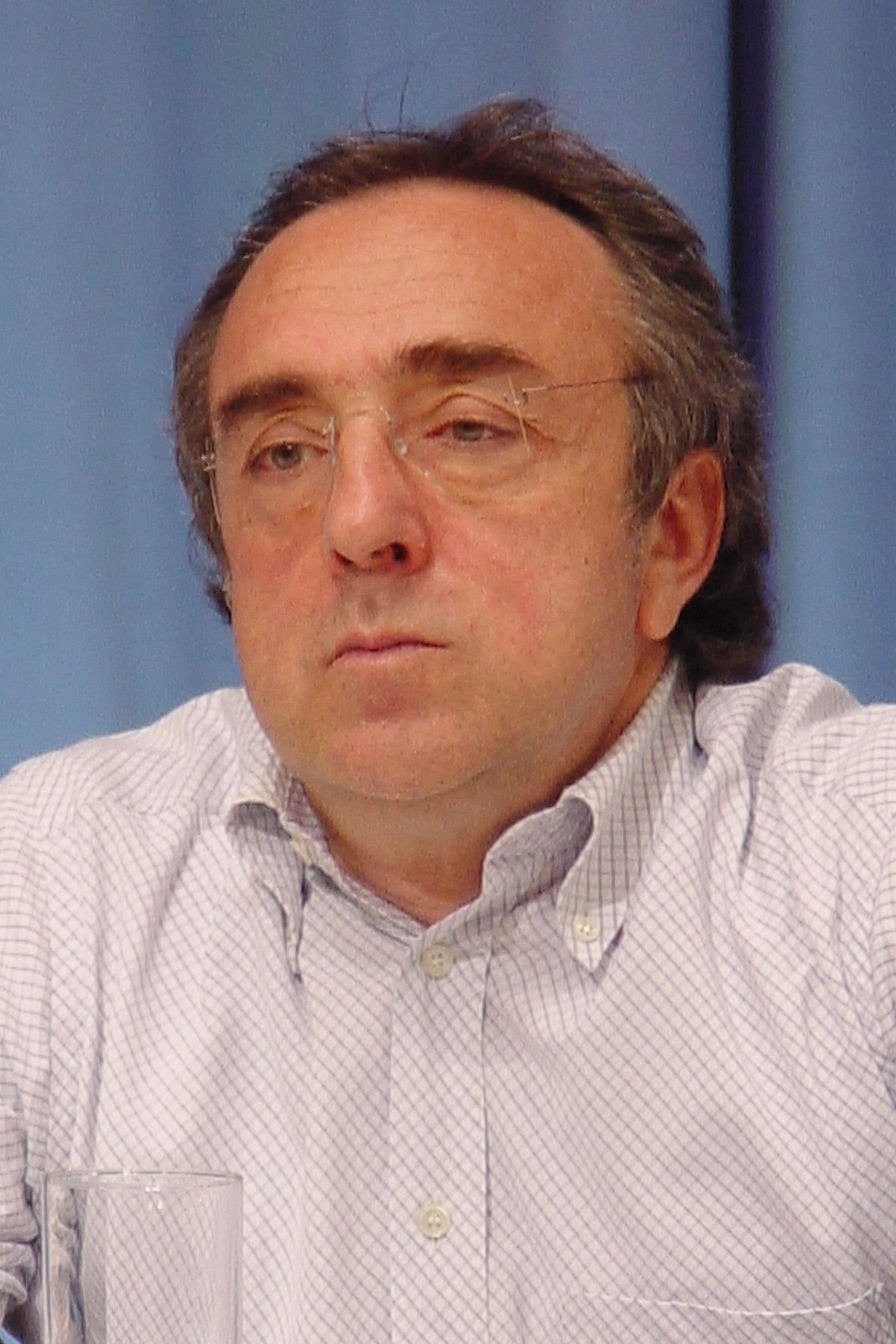
Silvio Orlando won in 2006 his role in The Caiman after seven nominations.

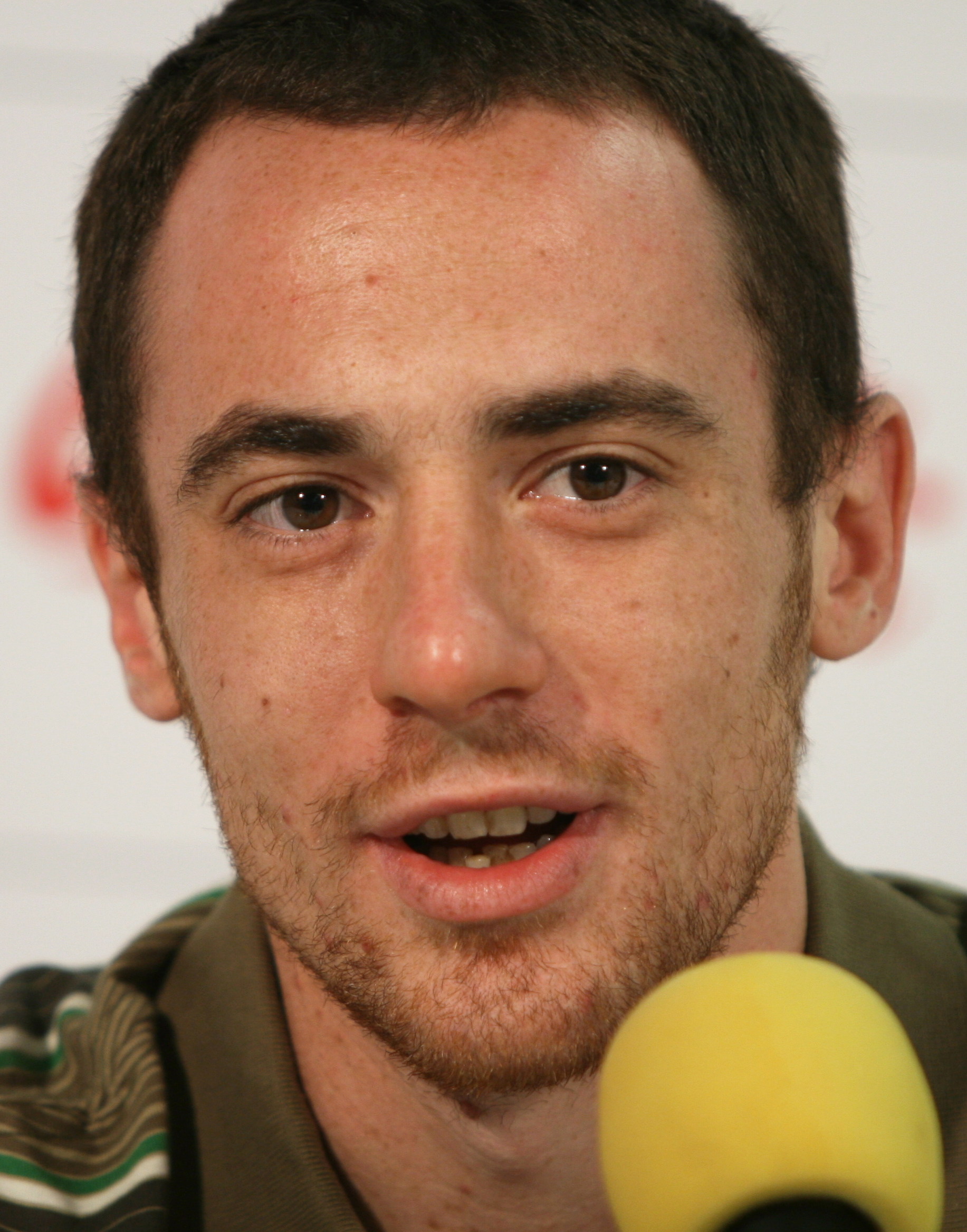
Elio Germano won the award three times out of four nominations, for his roles in My Brother is an Only Child (2007), La nostra vita (2010) and Leopardi (2014).

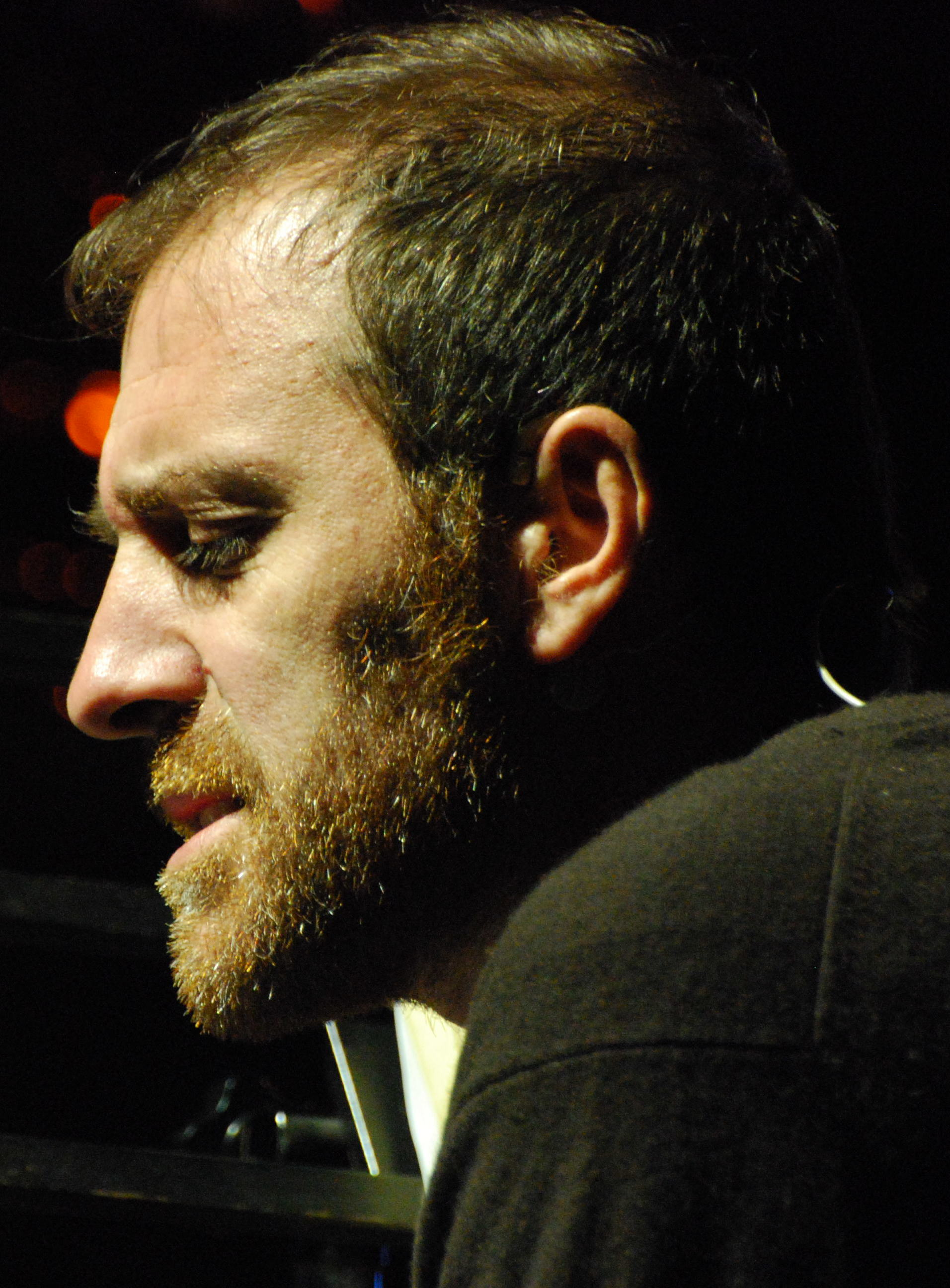
Valerio Mastandrea won the award twice, for The First Beautiful Thing (2010) and Balancing Act (2014), being nominated seven times.

=== 1950s ===
Year	Actor	Role(s)	Film	Ref.
1955/56 (1st)
1955/56 (1st)	Vittorio De Sica	Antonio Carotenuto	Scandal in Sorrento	
1956/57 (2nd)
1957/58 (3rd)
1958/59 (4th)

=== 1960s ===
Year	Actor	Role(s)	Film	Ref.
1959/60 (5th)
1959/60 (5th)	Vittorio Gassman	Private Giovanni Busacca	The Great War	
1959/60 (5th)	Alberto Sordi	Private Oreste Jacovacci	The Great War	
1960/61 (6th)
1960/61 (6th)	Alberto Sordi	Second lieutenant Alberto Innocenzi	Everybody Go Home	
1961/62 (7th)
1961/62 (7th)	Raf Vallone	Edoardo "Eddie" Carbone	A View from the Bridge	
1962/63 (8th)
1962/63 (8th)	Vittorio Gassmann	Bruno Cortona	Il Sorpasso	
1963/64 (9th)
1963/64 (9th)	Marcello Mastroianni	Carmine Sbaratti / Renzo / Augusto Rusconi	Yesterday, Today and Tomorrow	
1964/65 (10th)
1964/65 (10th)	Vittorio Gassmann	Giuliano Maria	Hard Time for Princes	
1964/65 (10th)	Marcello Mastroianni	Domenico Soriano	Marriage Italian-Style	
1965/66 (11th)
1965/66 (11th)	Alberto Sordi	Dante Fontana	Fumo di Londra	
1966/67 (12th)
1966/67 (12th)	Vittorio Gassmann	Francesco Vincenzini	The Tiger and the Pussycat	
1966/67 (12th)	Ugo Tognazzi	Sergio Masini	The Climax	
1967/68 (13th)
1967/68 (13th)	Franco Nero	Captain Bellodi	The Day of the Owl	
1968/69 (14th)
1968/69 (14th)	Nino Manfredi	Cacopardo / Angelo Perfili / Ercole / Voyeur / Telephone operator / Maurizio / Nanni	I See Naked	
1968/69 (14th)	Alberto Sordi	Dr. Guido Tersilli	Be Sick... It's Free	

=== 1970s ===
Year	Actor	Role(s)	Film	Ref.
1969/70 (15th)
1969/70 (15th)	Nino Manfredi	Cornacchia / Pasquino	The Conspirators	
1969/70 (15th)	Gian Maria Volonté	Il Dottore, Former Head of Homicide Squad	Investigation of a Citizen Above Suspicion	
1970/71 (16th)
1970/71 (16th)	Ugo Tognazzi	Annibale Doberdò	Lady Caliph	
1971/72 (17th)
1971/72 (17th)	Giancarlo Giannini	Carmelo 'Mimì' Mardocheo	The Seduction of Mimi	
1971/72 (17th)	Alberto Sordi	Giuseppe Di Noi	In Prison Awaiting Trial	
1972/73 (18th)
1972/73 (18th)	Alberto Sordi	Peppino	The Scientific Cardplayer	
1973/74 (19th)
1973/74 (19th)	Nino Manfredi	Giovanni 'Nino' Garofoli	Bread and Chocolate	
1974/75 (20th)
1974/75 (20th)	Vittorio Gassmann	Captain Fausto Consolo	Scent of a Woman	
1975/76 (21st)
1975/76 (21st)	Adriano Celentano	Felice 'Felix' Brianza	The Con Artists	
1975/76 (21st)	Ugo Tognazzi	Raffaello Mascetti	My Friends	
1976/77 (22nd)
1976/77 (22nd)	Alberto Sordi	Giovanni Vivaldi	An Average Little Man	
1977/78 (23rd)
1977/78 (23rd)	Nino Manfredi	Monsignor Colombo da Priverno	In the Name of the Pope King	
1978/79 (24th)
1978/79 (24th)	Vittorio Gassman	Albino Millozzi	Dear Father	

=== 1980s ===
Year	Actor	Role(s)	Film	Ref.
1979/80 (25th)
1979/80 (25th)	Adriano Celentano	Guido Quiller	Velvet Hands	
1980/81 (26th)
1980/81 (26th)	Massimo Troisi	Gaetano	I'm Starting from Three	
1980/81 (26th)	Michele Placido	Berardo Viola	Fontamara	
1980/81 (26th)	Carlo Verdone	Pasquale Amitrano / Furio Zoccano / Mimmo	Bianco, rosso e Verdone	
1981/82 (27th)
1981/82 (27th)	Carlo Verdone	Sergio Benvenuti	Talcum Powder	
1981/82 (27th)	Beppe Grillo	Giovanni	Looking for Jesus	
1981/82 (27th)	Alberto Sordi	Marquess Onofrio del Grillo / Gasperino	Il marchese del Grillo	
1982/83 (28th)
1982/83 (28th)	Francesco Nuti	Francesco 'Toscano' Piccioli	The Pool Hustlers	
1982/83 (28th)	Johnny Dorelli	Philip Neri	State buoni se potete	
1982/83 (28th)	Marcello Mastroianni	Giacomo Casanova	That Night in Varennes	
1983/84 (29th)
1983/84 (29th)	Giancarlo Giannini	Salvatore Cannavacciuolo	Where's Picone?	
1983/84 (29th)	Francesco Nuti	Francesco	Son contento	
1983/84 (29th)	Nanni Moretti	Michele Apicella	Sweet Body of Bianca	
1984/85 (30th)
1984/85 (30th)	Francesco Nuti	Francesco 'Toscano' Piccioli	Casablanca, Casablanca	
1984/85 (30th)	Ben Gazzara	The forgetful man	A Proper Scandal	
1984/85 (30th)	Michele Placido	Mario Vialone	Pizza Connection	
1985/86 (31st)
1985/86 (31st)	Marcello Mastroianni	Pippo Botticella / Fred	Ginger and Fred	
1985/86 (31st)	Nanni Moretti	Father Giulio	The Mass Is Ended	
1985/86 (31st)	Francesco Nuti	Romeo Casamonica	All the Fault of Paradise	
1986/87 (32nd)
1986/87 (32nd)	Vittorio Gassman	Adult Carlo / Carlo's grandfather	The Family	
1986/87 (32nd)	Diego Abatantuono	Franco Mattioli	Christmas Present	
1986/87 (32nd)	Gian Maria Volonté	Aldo Moro	The Moro Affair	
1987/88 (33rd)
1987/88 (33rd)	Marcello Mastroianni†	Romano	Dark Eyes	
1987/88 (33rd)	Philippe Noiret	Dr. Athos Fadigati	The Gold Rimmed Glasses	
1987/88 (33rd)	Carlo Verdone	Carlo Piergentili	Io e mia sorella	
1988/89 (34th)
1988/89 (34th)	Roberto Benigni	Giuditta	The Little Devil	
1988/89 (34th)	Giancarlo Giannini	Francis II of the Two Sicilies	'O Re	
1988/89 (34th)	Carlo Verdone	Piero Ruffolo	Compagni di scuola	

=== 1990s ===
Year	Actor	Role(s)	Film	Ref.
1989/90 (35th)
1989/90 (35th)	Paolo Villaggio	Prefect Gonnella	The Voice of the Moon	
1989/90 (35th)	Gian Maria Volonté	Judge Vito Di Francesco	Open Doors	
1989/90 (35th)	Sergio Castellitto	Paolo	Little Misunderstandings	
1989/90 (35th)	Giancarlo Giannini	Giuseppe Marchi	Dark Illness	
1989/90 (35th)	Nanni Moretti	Michele Apicella	Red Wood Pigeon	
1989/90 (35th)	Massimo Troisi	Michele	What Time Is It?	
1990/91 (36th)
1990/91 (36th)	Nanni Moretti	Cesare Botero	The Yes Man	
1990/91 (36th)	Diego Abatantuono	Sergeant major Nicola Lorusso	Mediterraneo	
1990/91 (36th)	Claudio Amendola	Principe	Ultrà	
1990/91 (36th)	Silvio Orlando	Luciano Sandulli	The Yes Man	
1990/91 (36th)	Sergio Rubini	Domenico	The Station	
1991/92 (37th)
1991/92 (37th)	Carlo Verdone	Bernardo Arbusti	Damned the Day I Met You	
1991/92 (37th)	Enrico Lo Verso	Officer Antonio	The Stolen Children	
1991/92 (37th)	Gian Maria Volonté	Roberto Franzò	A Simple Story	
1992/93 (38th)
1992/93 (38th)	Sergio Castellitto	Dr. Arturo	The Great Pumpkin	
1992/93 (38th)	Carlo Cecchi	Renato Caccioppoli	Death of a Neapolitan Mathematician	
1992/93 (38th)	Silvio Orlando	Saverio	Un'altra vita	
1993/94 (39th)
1993/94 (39th)	Giulio Scarpati	Judge Rosario Livatino	Law of Courage	
1993/94 (39th)	Diego Abatantuono	Saint Joseph	For Love, Only for Love	
1993/94 (39th)	Nanni Moretti	Nanni	Caro diario	
1993/94 (39th)	Silvio Orlando	Ciro Ascarone	Sud	
1994/95 (40th)
1994/95 (40th)	Marcello Mastroianni	Pereira	Sostiene Pereira	
1994/95 (40th)	Fabrizio Bentivoglio	Giorgio Ambrosoli	Un eroe borghese	
1994/95 (40th)	Massimo Troisi†	Mario Ruoppolo	Il Postino: The Postman	
1995/96 (41st)
1995/96 (41st)	Giancarlo Giannini	Sergio Amidei	Celluloide	
1995/96 (41st)	Sergio Castellitto	Giuseppe 'Joe Morelli' Romolo	The Star Maker	
1995/96 (41st)	Ennio Fantastichini	Ruggero Mazzalupi	August Vacation	
1995/96 (41st)	Giancarlo Giannini	Turi Arcangelo Leofonte	Palermo - Milan One Way	
1996/97 (42nd)
1996/97 (42nd)	Fabrizio Bentivoglio	Pietro Nava	An Eyewitness Account	
1996/97 (42nd)	Claudio Amendola	Claudio Braccio	My Generation	
1996/97 (42nd)	Leonardo Pieraccioni	Levante Quarini	The Cyclone	
1996/97 (42nd)	Sergio Rubini	Joystick	Nirvana	
1996/97 (42nd)	Carlo Verdone	Romeo Spera	I'm Crazy for Iris Blond	
1997/98 (43rd)
1997/98 (43rd)	Roberto Benigni‡	Guido Orefice	Life Is Beautiful	
1997/98 (43rd)	Nanni Moretti	Himself	April	
1997/98 (43rd)	Silvio Orlando	Vincenzo Lipari	Auguri professore	
1998/99 (44th)
1998/99 (44th)	Stefano Accorsi	Freccia	Radiofreccia	
1998/99 (44th)	Antonio Albanese	Alex Drastico / Ivo Perego / Pacifico	La fame e la sete	
1998/99 (44th)	Silvio Orlando	Ernesto	Fuori dal mondo	

=== 2000s ===
Year	Actor	Role(s)	Film	Ref.
1999/00 (45th)
1999/00 (45th)	Bruno Ganz	Fernando Girasole	Bread and Tulips	
1999/00 (45th)	Stefano Accorsi	Horst Fantazzini	Outlaw	
1999/00 (45th)	Fabrizio Gifuni	Marco	A Love	
1999/00 (45th)	Carlo Verdone	Ercole Preziosi	A Chinese in a Coma	
2000/01 (46th)
2000/01 (46th)	Luigi Lo Cascio	Peppino Impastato	One Hundred Steps	
2000/01 (46th)	Stefano Accorsi	Carlo	The Last Kiss	
2000/01 (46th)	Nanni Moretti	Giovanni	The Son's Room	
2001/02 (47th)
2001/02 (47th)	Giancarlo Giannini	Eugenio	I Love You Eugenio	
2001/02 (47th)	Luigi Lo Cascio	Antonio	Light of My Eyes	
2001/02 (47th)	Toni Servillo	Antonio 'Tony' Pisapia	L'uomo in più	
2002/03 (48th)
2002/03 (48th)	Massimo Girotti	Davide Veroli	Facing Windows	
2002/03 (48th)	Roberto Benigni	Pinocchio	Pinocchio	
2002/03 (48th)	Fabrizio Bentivoglio	Carlo Ristuccia	Remember Me, My Love	
2002/03 (48th)	Sergio Castellitto	Ernesto Picciafuoco	My Mother's Smile	
2002/03 (48th)	Neri Marcorè	Nello Balocchi	Incantato	
2002/03 (48th)	Fabio Volo	Tommaso	Casomai	
2003/04 (49th)
2003/04 (49th)	Sergio Castellitto	Timoteo	Don't Move	
2003/04 (49th)	Giuseppe Battiston	Romeo D'Avanzo	Agata and the Storm	
2003/04 (49th)	Luigi Lo Cascio	Nicola Carati	The Best of Youth	
2003/04 (49th)	Silvio Muccino	Matteo	What Will Happen to Us	
2003/04 (49th)	Carlo Verdone	Gilberto Mercuri	Love Is Eternal While It Lasts	
2004/05 (50th)
2004/05 (50th)	Toni Servillo	Titta Di Girolamo	The Consequences of Love	
2004/05 (50th)	Stefano Accorsi	Marco Battaglia	Smalltown, Italy	
2004/05 (50th)	Giorgio Pasotti	Martino	After Midnight	
2004/05 (50th)	Kim Rossi Stuart	Gianni	The Keys to the House	
2004/05 (50th)	Luca Zingaretti	Father Pino Puglisi	Come into the Light	
2005/06 (51st)
2005/06 (51st)	Silvio Orlando	Bruno Bonomo	The Caiman	
2005/06 (51st)	Antonio Albanese	Giordano Ricci	The Second Wedding Night	
2005/06 (51st)	Fabrizio Bentivoglio	Luigi Di Santo	Our Land	
2005/06 (51st)	Kim Rossi Stuart	Freddo	Romanzo Criminale	
2005/06 (51st)	Carlo Verdone	Achille De Bellis	My Best Enemy	
2006/07 (52nd)
2006/07 (52nd)	Elio Germano	Antonio 'Accio' Benassi	My Brother is an Only Child	
2006/07 (52nd)	Vincenzo Amato	Salvatore Mancuso	Nuovomondo	
2006/07 (52nd)	Michele Placido	Muffa	The Unknown Woman	
2006/07 (52nd)	Giacomo Rizzo	Geremia de' Geremei	The Family Friend	
2006/07 (52nd)	Kim Rossi Stuart	Renato Benetti	Along the Ridge	
2007/08 (53rd)
2007/08 (53rd)	Toni Servillo	Commissioner Giovanni Sanzio	The Girl by the Lake	
2007/08 (53rd)	Antonio Albanese	Michele	Days and Clouds	
2007/08 (53rd)	Lando Buzzanca	Prince Giacomo Uzeda di Francalanza	I Viceré	
2007/08 (53rd)	Nanni Moretti	Pietro Paladini	Quiet Chaos	
2007/08 (53rd)	Kim Rossi Stuart	Luca Flores	Piano, solo	
2008/09 (54th)
2008/09 (54th)	Toni Servillo	Giulio Andreotti	Il Divo	
2008/09 (54th)	Luca Argentero	Piero	Different from Whom?	
2008/09 (54th)	Claudio Bisio	Nello	We Can Do That	
2008/09 (54th)	Valerio Mastandrea	Stefano Nardin	Don't Think About It	
2008/09 (54th)	Silvio Orlando	Michele Casali	Giovanna's Father	

=== 2010s ===
Year	Actor	Role(s)	Film	Ref.
2009/10 (55th)
2009/10 (55th)	Valerio Mastandrea	Bruno Michelucci	The First Beautiful Thing	
2009/10 (55th)	Antonio Albanese	Alberto	A Question of the Heart	
2009/10 (55th)	Libero De Rienzo	Giancarlo Siani	Fort Apache Napoli	
2009/10 (55th)	Kim Rossi Stuart	Angelo	A Question of the Heart	
2009/10 (55th)	Filippo Timi	Benito Mussolini / Benito Albino Dalser	Vincere	
2010/11 (56th)
2010/11 (56th)	Elio Germano	Claudio	La nostra vita	
2010/11 (56th)	Antonio Albanese	Cetto La Qualunque	Qualunquemente	
2010/11 (56th)	Claudio Bisio	Alberto Colombo	Benvenuti al Sud	
2010/11 (56th)	Vinicio Marchioni	Aureliano Amadei	20 Cigarettes	
2010/11 (56th)	Kim Rossi Stuart	Renato Vallanzasca	Angel of Evil	
2011/12 (57th)
2011/12 (57th)	Michel Piccoli	Pope Melville	We Have a Pope	
2011/12 (57th)	Fabrizio Bentivoglio	Bruno	Easy!	
2011/12 (57th)	Elio Germano	Pietro Potenchiavelli	Magnificent Presence	
2011/12 (57th)	Marco Giallini	Domenico Segato	A Flat for Three	
2011/12 (57th)	Valerio Mastandrea	Commissioner Luigi Calabresi	Piazza Fontana: The Italian Conspiracy	
2012/13 (58th)
2012/13 (58th)	Valerio Mastandrea	Giulio	Balancing Act	
2012/13 (58th)	Aniello Arena	Luciano	Reality	
2012/13 (58th)	Sergio Castellitto	Leone	A Perfect Family	
2012/13 (58th)	Roberto Herlitzka	Professor Fiorito	The Red and the Blue	
2012/13 (58th)	Luca Marinelli	Guido	Every Blessed Day	
2012/13 (58th)	Toni Servillo	Enrico Oliveri / Giovanni Ernani	Long Live Freedom	
2013/14 (59th)
2013/14 (59th)	Toni Servillo	Jep Gambardella	The Great Beauty	
2013/14 (59th)	Giuseppe Battiston	Paolo Bressan	Zoran, My Nephew the Idiot	
2013/14 (59th)	Fabrizio Bentivoglio	Dino Ossola	Human Capital	
2013/14 (59th)	Carlo Cecchi	Carlo Grimaldi	Miele	
2013/14 (59th)	Edoardo Leo	Pietro Zinni	I Can Quit Whenever I Want	
2014/15 (60th)
2014/15 (60th)	Elio Germano	Giacomo Leopardi	Leopardi	
2014/15 (60th)	Fabrizio Ferracane	Luciano	Black Souls	
2014/15 (60th)	Alessandro Gassmann	Paolo Pontecorvo	An Italian Name	
2014/15 (60th)	Marco Giallini	Tommaso De Luca	God Willing	
2014/15 (60th)	Riccardo Scamarcio	Gaetano	You Can't Save Yourself Alone	
2015 (61st)
2015 (61st)	Claudio Santamaria	Enzo Ceccotti	They Call Me Jeeg	
2015 (61st)	Alessandro Borghi	Vittorio	Don't Be Bad	
2015 (61st)	Marco Giallini	Rocco	Perfect Strangers	
2015 (61st)	Luca Marinelli	Cesare	Don't Be Bad	
2015 (61st)	Valerio Mastandrea	Lele	Perfect Strangers	
2016 (62nd)
2016 (62nd)	Stefano Accorsi	Loris De Martino	Italian Race	
2016 (62nd)	Valerio Mastandrea	Massimo	Sweet Dreams	
2016 (62nd)	Michele Riondino	Libero	Worldly Girl	
2016 (62nd)	Sergio Rubini	Oreste Campese	La stoffa dei sogni	
2016 (62nd)	Toni Servillo	Father Roberto Salus	The Confessions	
2017 (63rd)
2017 (63rd)	Renato Carpentieri	Lorenzo	Tenderness	
2017 (63rd)	Antonio Albanese	Giovanni	Come un gatto in tangenziale	
2017 (63rd)	Alessandro Borghi	Andrea Galderisi / Luca	Napoli velata	
2017 (63rd)	Valerio Mastandrea	The Man	The Place	
2017 (63rd)	Nicola Nocella	Isidoro 'Easy'	Easy	
2018 (64th)
2018 (64th)	Alessandro Borghi	Stefano Cucchi	On My Skin	
2018 (64th)	Marcello Fonte	Marcello	Dogman	
2018 (64th)	Luca Marinelli	Fabrizio De André	Fabrizio De André - Principe libero	
2018 (64th)	Riccardo Scamarcio	Matteo	Euphoria	
2018 (64th)	Toni Servillo	Silvio Berlusconi	Loro	

=== 2020s ===
Year	Actor	Role(s)	Film	Ref.
2019 (65th)
2019 (65th)	Pierfrancesco Favino	Tommaso Buscetta	The Traitor	
2019 (65th)	Alesandro Borghi	Remo	The First King: Birth of an Empire	
2019 (65th)	Francesco Di Leva	Antonio Barracano	The Mayor of Rione Sanità	
2019 (65th)	Luca Marinelli	Martin Eden	Martin Eden	
2019 (65th)	Toni Servillo	Peppino Lo Cicero	5 Is the Perfect Number	
2020/21 (66th)
2020/21 (66th)	Elio Germano	Antonio Ligabue	Hidden Away	
2020/21 (66th)	Kim Rossi Stuart	Bruno Salvati	Everything's Gonna Be Alright	
2020/21 (66th)	Pierfrancesco Favino	Bettino Craxi	Hammamet	
2020/21 (66th)	Renato Pozzetto	Giuseppe "Nino" Sgarbi	We Still Talk	
2020/21 (66th)	Valerio Mastandrea	Nicola	Figli	
2021/22 (67th)
2021/22 (67th)	Silvio Orlando	Carmine Lagioia	The Inner Cage	
2021/22 (67th)	Elio Germano	Massimo Sisti	America Latina	
2021/22 (67th)	Filippo Scotti	Fabietto Schisa	The Hand of God	
2021/22 (67th)	Franz Rogowski	Franz	Freaks Out	
2021/22 (67th)	Toni Servillo	Eduardo Scarpetta	The King of Laughter	
2022 (68th)
2022 (68th)	Fabrizio Gifuni	Aldo Moro	Exterior Night	
2022 (68th)	Alessandro Borghi	Bruno Guglielmina	The Eight Mountains	
2022 (68th)	Ficarra e Picone	Bastiano and Nofrio	Strangeness	
2022 (68th)	Luigi Lo Cascio	Aldo Braibanti	Lord of the Ants	
2022 (68th)	Luca Marinelli	Pietro Guasti	The Eight Mountains	
2023 (69th)
2023 (69th)	Michele Riondino	Caterino Lamanna	Palazzina Laf	
2023 (69th)	Antonio Albanese	Antonio Riva	A Hundred Sundays	
2023 (69th)	Pierfrancesco Favino	Salvatore Todaro	Comandante	
2023 (69th)	Valerio Mastandrea	Ivano	There's Still Tomorrow	
2023 (69th)	Josh O'Connor	Arthur	La chimera	
2024 (70th)
2024 (70th)	Elio Germano	Enrico Berlinguer	The Great Ambition	
2024 (70th)	Francesco Gheghi	Luigi "Gigi" Celeste	Familia	
2024 (70th)	Fabrizio Gifuni	Luigi Comencini	The Time It Takes	
2024 (70th)	Silvio Orlando	Devoto Marotta	Parthenope	
2024 (70th)	Tommaso Ragno	Cesare Graziadei	Vermiglio	

== Multiple wins and nominations ==
The following individuals have won multiple Best Actor awards:

Wins	Actor
7	Vittorio Gassman
7	Alberto Sordi
5	Marcello Mastroianni
4	Giancarlo Giannini
4	Nino Manfredi
4	Toni Servillo
3	Elio Germano
3	Ugo Tognazzi
2	Stefano Accorsi
2	Roberto Benigni
2	Sergio Castellitto
2	Adriano Celentano
2	Valerio Mastandrea
2	Francesco Nuti
2	Carlo Verdone
2	Gian Maria Volonté

Both Vittorio Gassman (left) and Alberto Sordi (right), here pictured on the set of The Great War (1959), won the award seven times, more than everyone else.

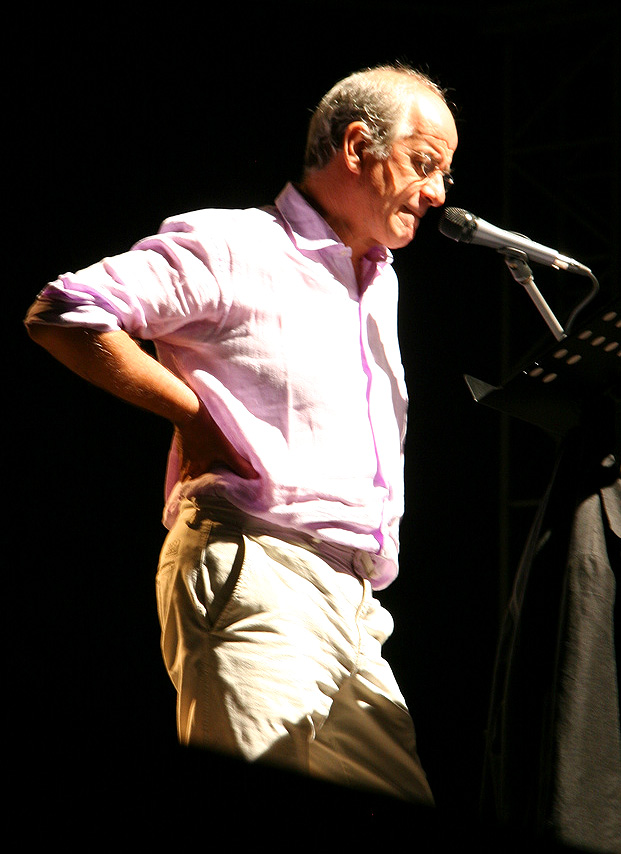
Toni Servillo has been nominated eleven times, more than everyone else.

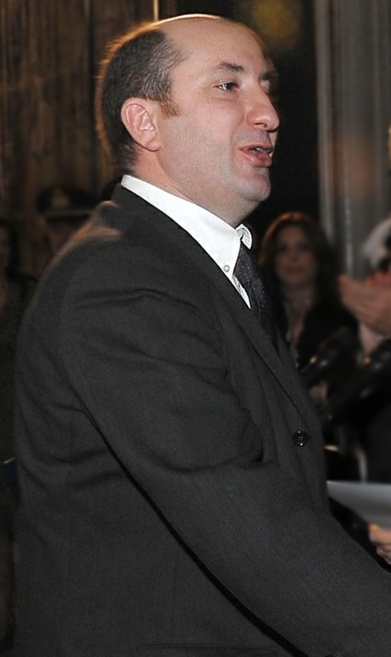
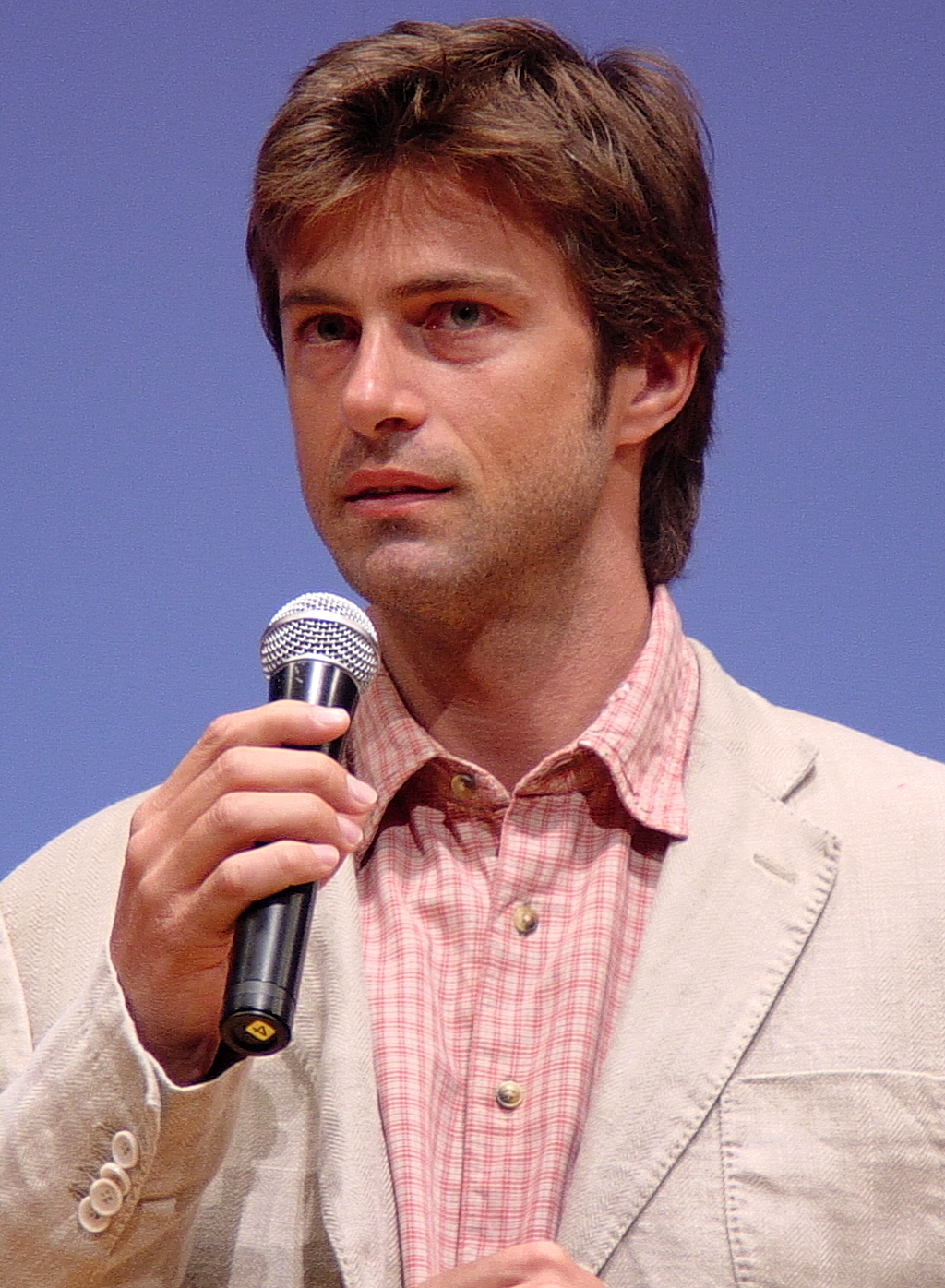
Antonio Albanese and Kim Rossi Stuart are both the most nominated actors without any wins, having been nominated six times each.

The following individuals have received three or more Best Actor nominations (* indicates no wins):

Nominations	Actor
11	Toni Servillo
9	Carlo Verdone
8	Nanni Moretti
8	Alberto Sordi
7	Vittorio Gassman
7	Giancarlo Giannini
7	Valerio Mastandrea
7	Silvio Orlando
6	Antonio Albanese*
6	Fabrizio Bentivoglio
6	Sergio Castellitto
6	Marcello Mastroianni
6	Kim Rossi Stuart*
5	Stefano Accorsi
4	Elio Germano
4	Nino Manfredi
4	Francesco Nuti
4	Gian Maria Volonté
3	Diego Abatantuono*
3	Roberto Benigni
3	Alessandro Borghi
3	Marco Giallini*
3	Luigi Lo Cascio
3	Luca Marinelli
3	Michele Placido
3	Sergio Rubini*
3	Ugo Tognazzi
3	Massimo Troisi

== See also ==
- Nastro d'Argento for Best Actor
- Cinema of Italy
