= Toni Servillo =

Italian actor (born 1959)

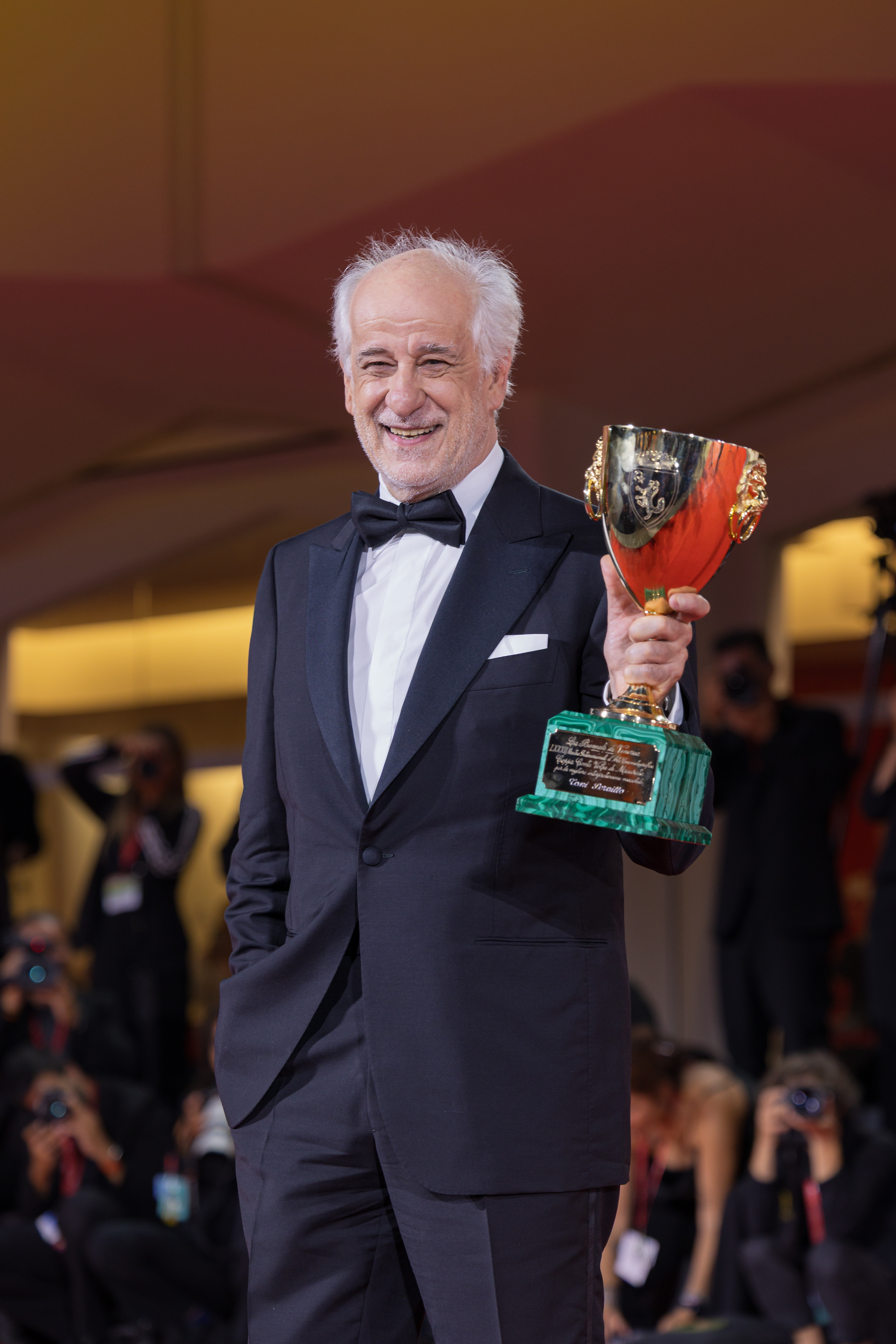
- Servillo in 2025
- Born: Marco Antonio Servillo; 25 January 1959 (age 67); Afragola, Campania, Italy
- Occupations: Film actor; theatre actor; theatre director; opera director
- Years active: 1987–present
- Website: www.toniservillo.it

Marco Antonio "Toni" Servillo (Italian: [ˈtɔːni serˈvillo]; born 25 January 1959) is an Italian actor and theatrical director.

He has won the European Film Award for Best Actor twice, in 2008 for both Gomorrah and Il Divo and in 2013 for The Great Beauty, as well as winning the David di Donatello for Best Actor four times between 2002 and 2013. In 2020, The New York Times ranked him #7 on its list of the 25 Greatest Actors of the 21st Century.

== Early life ==
Servillo was born on 25 January 1959 in Afragola, Campania. He is the brother of musician Peppe Servillo.

== Career ==
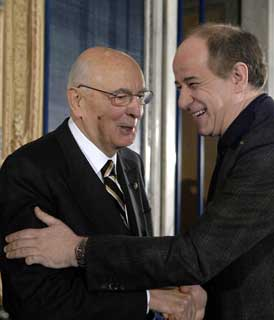
Toni Servillo (right) in 2007, with the then President of the Italian Republic Giorgio Napolitano

His international breakthrough roles came in 2008 as Giulio Andreotti in Il Divo and Roberto's boss Franco in Gomorrah. Both films were nominated in the Golden Palm awards.

Between 2000 and 2007, he also directed several opera productions, including Cimarosa's Il marito disperato and Beethoven's Fidelio for the Teatro di San Carlo in Naples, and Mussorgsky's Boris Godunov at the Teatro Nacional de São Carlos in Lisbon, where in 2003 he also staged Richard Strauss's Ariadne auf Naxos.

Servillo has frequently collaborated with director Paolo Sorrentino, notably portraying Italian political figures such as Giulio Andreotti in Il Divo (2008) and Silvio Berlusconi in Loro (2018). In 2013, he was selected as Best Actor at the 26th European Film Awards for his performance in The Great Beauty. He later appeared in The Hand of God (2021). In 2025, he starred in La grazia, for which he won the Volpi Cup for Best Actor at the 82nd Venice International Film Festival.

== Personal life ==
Since the 1960s he has lived in Caserta, with his wife and his children.

== Filmography ==
=== Film ===
Year	Title	Role	Notes
1992	Death of a Neapolitan Mathematician	Pietro	
1993	Rasoi	Il guappo	Also screenwriter
1997	The Vesuvians	Mayor of Naples	Segment: La Salita
1998	Rehearsals for War	Franco Turco	
2001	One Man Up	Tony Pisapia	
2001	Red Moon	Amerigo	
2004	The Consequences of Love	Titta di Girolamo	
2004	Changing Destiny	Angelo Cardi	As Antonio Servillo
2004	Notte senza fine	Salem	
2005	Incidenti	Narrator (voice)	
2007	Il pianto della statua	Narrator (voice)	
2007	The Girl by the Lake	Giovanni Sanzio	
2007	Don't Waste Your Time, Johnny!	Maestro Domenico Falasco	
2008	Gomorrah	Franco	
2008	Il Divo	Giulio Andreotti	
2008	Non chiederci la parola	Narrator (voice)	
2009	L'ultima salita	Narrator (voice)	
2009	Deserto rosa	Narrator (voice)	
2010	Gorbaciof	Gorbaciof	
2010	We Believed	Giuseppe Mazzini	
2010	A Quiet Life	Rosario Russo	
2010	A View of Love	Sergio Bartoli	
2011	The Jewel	Ernesto Botta	
2012	It Was the Son	Nicola Ciarlo	
2012	Dormant Beauty	Uliano Beffardi	
2012	Il viaggio della signorina Vila	Narrator (voice)	Short film
2013	Long Live Freedom	Enrico Oliveri / Giovanni Ernani	
2013	The Great Beauty	Jep Gambardella	
2016	The Confessions	Roberto Salus	
2017	Lasciati andare	Elia	
2017	The Girl in the Fog	Agente Vogel	
2018	Loro	Silvio Berlusconi / Ennio Doris	
2019	5 is the Perfect Number	Peppino Lo Cicero	
2019	Into the Labyrinth	Bruno Genko	
2021	The Hand of God	Saverio Schisa	
2021	The King of Laughter	Eduardo Scarpetta	
2021	The Inner Cage	Gaetano Gargiuolo	
2022	Exterior Night	Pope Paul VI	
2022	Strangeness	Luigi Pirandello	
2023	The First Day of My Life	The Man	
2023	Adagio	Daytona	
2024	Sicilian Letters	Catello	
2025	The Illusion	Vincenzo Giordano Orsini	
2025	La grazia	President Mariano De Santis	

=== Television ===
Year	Title	Role	Notes
2004	Sabato, domenica e lunedì	Peppino Priore	Television film
2014	Le voci di dentro	Antonio Saporito	Television film

== Awards and nominations ==
Year	Association	Category	Nominated work	Result
1998	Nastro d'Argento	Best Actor	The Vesuvians	Nominated
2001	Venice International Film Festival	Pasinetti Award	Red Moon	Won
2002	Golden Ciak	Best Supporting Actor	Red Moon	Nominated
2002	Angers European First Film Festival	Jean Carment Award	One Man Up	Won
2002	David di Donatello	Best Actor	One Man Up	Nominated
2002	Nastro d'Argento	Best Actor	One Man Up	Nominated
2005	David di Donatello	Best Actor	The Consequences of Love	Won
2005	Nastro d'Argento	Best Actor	The Consequences of Love	Won
2005	European Film Award	People's Choice Award for Best Actor	The Consequences of Love	Nominated
2008	Venice International Film Festival	Pasinetti Award for Best Actor	The Girl by the Lake	Won
2008	David di Donatello	Best Actor	The Girl by the Lake	Won
2008	Nastro d'Argento	Best Actor	The Girl by the Lake	Won
2008	Italian Golden Globe	Best Actor	The Girl by the Lake	Nominated
2008	Golden Ciak	Best Supporting Actor	Don't Waste Your Time, Johnny!	Nominated
2008	European Film Award	Best Actor	Gomorrah and Il Divo	Won
2009	David di Donatello	Best Actor	Il Divo	Won
2009	Dublin Film Critics' Circle Award	Best Actor	Il Divo	Nominated
2009	Nastro d'Argento	Best Actor	Il Divo	Won
2009	Golden Ciak	Best Actor	Il Divo	Won
2009	Village Voice Film Poll	Best Actor	Il Divo	Nominated
2009	Italian Golden Globe	Best Actor	Gomorrah	Won
2009	Locarno International Film Festival	Excellence Award		Won
2010	Rome Film Festival	Best Actor	A Quiet Life	Won
2011	Nastro d'Argento	Best Actor	A Quiet Life and The Jewel	Nominated
2011	Nastro d'Argento	Silver Ribbon of the Year	We Believed	Won
2011	Italian Golden Globe	Best Actor	Gorbaciof	Nominated
2013	David di Donatello	Best Actor	Long Live Freedom	Nominated
2013	Golden Ciak	Best Actor	Long Live Freedom	Won
2013	Nastro d'Argento	Special Silver Ribbon	The Great Beauty, Long Live Freedom, Dormant Beauty	Won
2013	Dublin Film Critics' Circle Award	Best Actor	The Great Beauty	Nominated
2013	European Film Award	Best Actor	The Great Beauty	Won
2013	Italian Golden Globe	Best Actor	The Great Beauty	Won
2013	Seville European Film Festival	Best Actor	The Great Beauty	Won
2013	Village Voice Film Poll	Best Actor	The Great Beauty	Nominated
2014	David di Donatello	Best Actor	The Great Beauty	Won
2014	Golden Ciak	Best Actor	The Great Beauty	Won
2017	David di Donatello	Best Actor	The Confessions	Nominated
2017	Nastro d'Argento	Best Actor	Lasciati andare	Nominated
2018	Italian Golden Globe	Best Actor	The Girl in the Fog	Won
2018	Nastro d'Argento	Best Actor	Loro	Nominated
2019	David di Donatello	Best Actor	Loro	Nominated
2019	David di Donatello	Best Song	Loro	Nominated
2020	David di Donatello	Best Actor	5 Is the Perfect Number	Nominated
2020	Nastro d'Argento	Lifetime Achievement Award		Won
2021	Venice International Film Festival	Pasinetti Award for Best Actor	The King of Laughter	Won
2022	Capri Hollywood International Film Festival	Italian Actor of the Year	The Hand of God, The King of Laughter, Ariaferma	Won
2022	Capri Hollywood International Film Festival	Capri Master of Cinematic Art		Won
2022	David di Donatello	Best Actor	The King of Laughter	Nominated
2022	David di Donatello	Best Supporting Actor	The Hand of God	Nominated
2023	David di Donatello	Best Supporting Actor	Exterior Night	Nominated
2025	Venice Film Festival	Volpi Cup for Best Actor	La grazia	Won
2026	European Film Award	Best Actor	La grazia	Nominated
