= La grazia =

2025 film by Paolo Sorrentino

- Theatrical release poster
- Directed by: Paolo Sorrentino
- Written by: Paolo Sorrentino
- Produced by: Paolo Sorrentino; Annamaria Morelli
- Starring: Toni Servillo; Anna Ferzetti; Massimo Venturiello
- Cinematography: Daria D'Antonio
- Edited by: Cristiano Travaglioli
- Production companies: Fremantle; The Apartment Pictures; Numero 10
- Distributed by: PiperFilm; Warner Bros. Entertainment Italia
- Release dates: 27 August 2025 (Venice); 15 January 2026 (Italy)
- Running time: 133 minutes
- Country: Italy
- Language: Italian
- Box office: $10.7 million

La grazia (lit. 'The pardon') is a 2025 Italian drama film produced, written and directed by Paolo Sorrentino. Starring Toni Servillo, Anna Ferzetti, and Massimo Venturiello, it follows a fictional Catholic Italian president conflicted about the pending approval of euthanasia in the country.

The film had its world premiere as the opening film of the 82nd Venice International Film Festival on 27 August 2025, where Servillo won the Volpi Cup for Best Actor. It was theatrically released in Italy on 15 January 2026.

== Plot ==
President of Italy Mariano De Santis, a staunch Catholic and experienced jurist, begins his white semester and is conflicted about whether he should sign into law a bill legalizing euthanasia, and at the same time has to consider the pardon petitions of two individuals who murdered their partners before the end of his term.

== Cast ==
- Toni Servillo as President Mariano De Santis
- Anna Ferzetti as Dorotea De Santis
- Massimo Venturiello as Minister of Justice Ugo Romani
- Orlando Cinque as Colonel Massimo Labaro
- Milvia Marigliano as Coco Valori
- Giuseppe Gaiani as General Lanfranco Mare
- Giovanna Guida as Valeria Cafiero
- Simone Colombari as Prime Minister Giulio Malerba
- Alessia Giuliani as Maria Gallo
- Roberto Zibetti as Domenico Samaritano
- Linda Messerklinger as Isa Rocca
- Vasco Mirandola as Cristiano Arpa
- Rufin Doh Zeyenouin as the Pope

Additionally, rapper Guè appears as himself.

== Production ==
=== Development ===
The film was announced on 4 December 2024, with Paolo Sorrentino writing and directing. Sorrentino explained that the inspiration for the film came by the case of a man pardoned by Italian president Sergio Mattarella after being convicted for murdering his wife, who was suffering from Alzheimer's disease.

=== Casting ===
Toni Servillo, a longtime collaborator of Sorrentino, was announced as a cast member on 4 December 2024. In May 2025, Massimo Venturiello revealed that he had also taken part in the film.

=== Filming ===
Sorrentino had scouted locations throughout Piedmont prior to filming. Principal photography began in Turin in March 2025. Filming took place at the Castello del Valentino, the Moncalieri Castle, the Palazzo Chiablese, the Polytechnic University of Turin, the Accademia delle Scienze di Torino, the Museo Egizio, and the Tesoriera bowling alley. Filming also took place at the Piazza di Spagna in Rome. Filming was completed by early May 2025.

== Release ==
In February 2025, Mubi acquired worldwide rights to the film, excluding Italy; the company will distribute in North and Latin America, the U.K., Ireland, Germany, Austria, the Benelux, Spain, Turkey, India, Australia, and New Zealand, with their subsidiary The Match Factory handling sales elsewhere.

During a Q&A session at SXSW London in June 2025, Efe Cakarel, CEO of Mubi, hinted towards La grazia premiering at the 82nd Venice International Film Festival. This news was confirmed in July 2025, with La grazia announced as the festival's opening film; it premiered in competition for the Golden Lion on 27 August 2025. The film also screened at the New York Film Festival and the BFI London Film Festival. It received a theatrical release in Italy on 15 January 2026.

== Reception ==
=== Box office ===
It grossed $10.7 million worldwide. Including $8.6 million in Italy, where it was a box office success.

=== Critical response ===
On the review aggregator website Rotten Tomatoes, 88% of 80 critics' reviews are positive, with an average rating of 7.4/10. The website's consensus reads: "Celebrating the virtues of fortitude and patience, La Grazia is an atypically restrained effort from writer-director Paolo Sorrentino that reunites him with the dependably majestic Toni Servillo." Metacritic, which uses a weighted average, assigned the film a score of 69 out of 100, based on 22 critics, indicating "generally favorable" reviews.

=== Accolades ===
Award	Date of ceremony	Category	Recipient(s)	Result	Ref.
Venice Film Festival	September 6, 2025	Golden Lion	Paolo Sorrentino	Nominated	
Venice Film Festival	September 6, 2025	Brian Award	Paolo Sorrentino	Won	
Venice Film Festival	September 6, 2025	Volpi Cup for Best Actor	Toni Servillo	Won	
Venice Film Festival	September 6, 2025	Pasinelli Award	Anna Ferzetti	Won	
Chicago International Film Festival	October 24, 2025	Gold Hugo	La grazia	Nominated	
Chicago International Film Festival	October 24, 2025	Best Screenplay	Paolo Sorrentino	Won	
European Film Awards	January 17, 2026	Best Screenwriter	Paolo Sorrentino	Nominated	
European Film Awards	January 17, 2026	Best Actor	Toni Servillo	Nominated	
David di Donatello	May 6, 2026	Best Film	La grazia	Nominated	
David di Donatello	May 6, 2026	Young David Award	La grazia	Nominated	
David di Donatello	May 6, 2026	Best Director	Paolo Sorrentino	Nominated	
David di Donatello	May 6, 2026	Best Original Screenplay	Paolo Sorrentino	Nominated	
David di Donatello	May 6, 2026	Best Actress	Anna Ferzetti	Nominated	
David di Donatello	May 6, 2026	Best Actor	Toni Servillo	Nominated	
David di Donatello	May 6, 2026	Best Supporting Actress	Milvia Marigliano	Nominated	
David di Donatello	May 6, 2026	Best Casting	Anna Maria Sambucco, Massimo Appolloni	Nominated	
David di Donatello	May 6, 2026	Best Cinematography	Daria D'Antonio	Nominated	
David di Donatello	May 6, 2026	Production Design	Ludovica Ferrario, Laura Casalini	Nominated	
David di Donatello	May 6, 2026	Best Costumes	Carlo Poggioli	Nominated	
David di Donatello	May 6, 2026	Best Make-up	Paola Gattabrusi	Nominated	
David di Donatello	May 6, 2026	Best Editing	Cristiano Travaglioli	Nominated	
David di Donatello	May 6, 2026	Best Visual Effects	Rodolfo Migliari, Lena Di Gennaro	Nominated	
