= Fabio Grossi (actor) =

Italian actor and stage director (1958–2026)

Fabio Grossi (29 January 1958 – 24 August 2026) was an Italian actor and stage director. He appeared in numerous films including I fichissimi, The Family Friend, and Darker Than Midnight. Grossi died on 24 August 2026, at the age of 68.
