= Paolo Sorrentino =

Italian film director and screenwriter

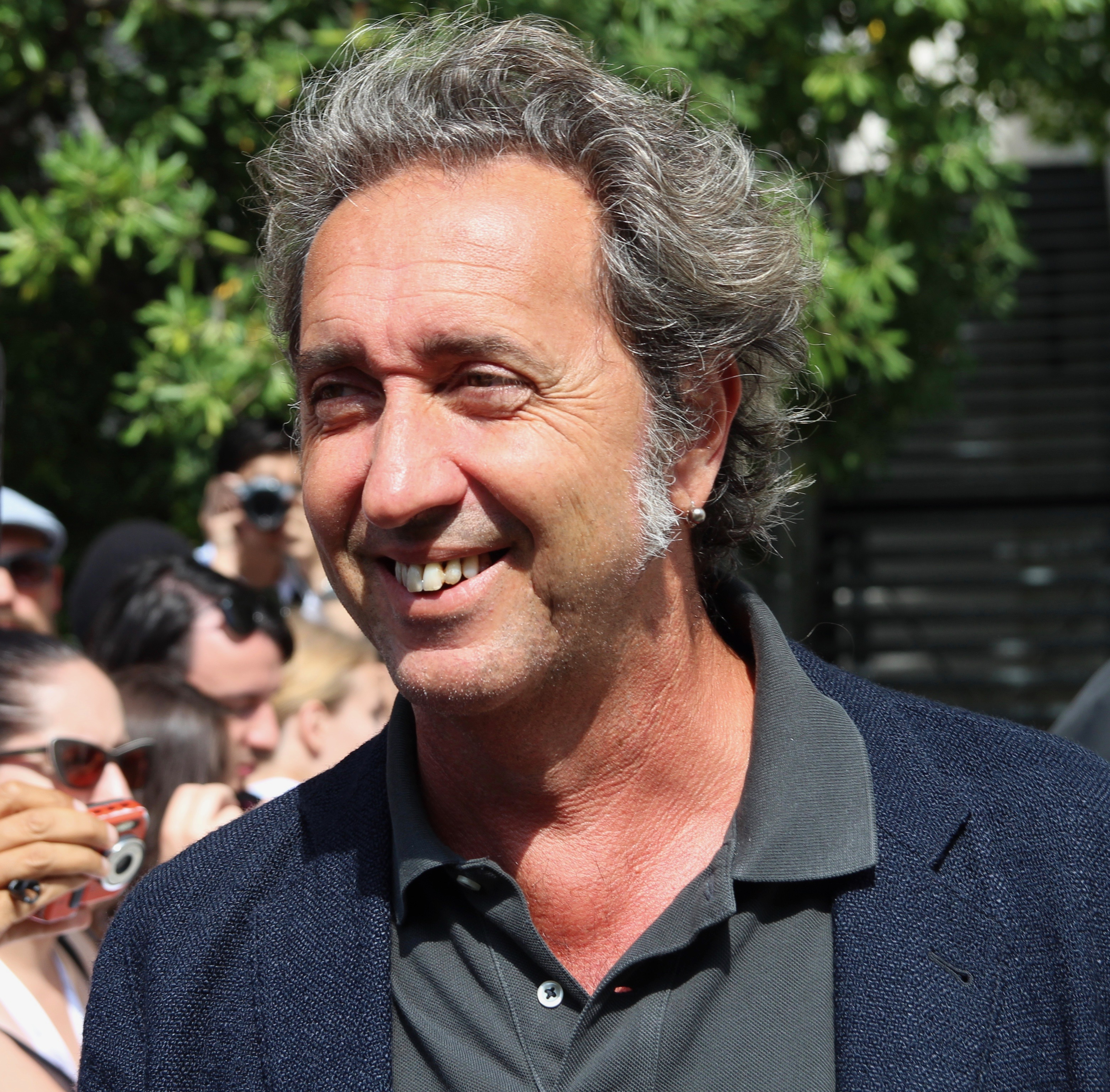
- Sorrentino at the 2018 Venice Film Festival
- Born: 31 May 1970 (age 56); Naples, Campania, Italy
- Education: University of Naples Federico II
- Occupations: Film director; screenwriter
- Years active: 1994–present
- Notable work: Il Divo (2009); The Great Beauty (2013); The Hand of God (2021)
- Awards: Full list

Paolo Sorrentino (/ˌsɒrənˈtiːnoʊ/ SORR-ən-TEE-noh, Italian: [ˈpaːolo sorrenˈtiːno]; born 31 May 1970) is an Italian film director, screenwriter, and writer. He is considered one of the most prominent filmmakers of Italian cinema working today. He is known for visually striking and complex dramas and has often been compared to Federico Fellini and Michelangelo Antonioni. He has received numerous accolades, including an Academy Award accepted for Best International Film, a BAFTA Award, a Golden Globe, two Cannes Film Festival prizes, four Venice Film Festival Awards and four European Film Awards. In Italy he was honoured with eight David di Donatello and six Nastro d'Argento awards.

Sorrentino made his directorial film debut with the Italian comedy-drama One Man Up (2001), for which he received the Nastro d'Argento for Best New Director, followed by The Consequences of Love (2004), The Family Friend (2006), and This Must Be the Place (2011). The biographical drama Il Divo (2009) was awarded the Cannes Film Festival Jury Prize. He received critical acclaim with the art drama The Great Beauty (2013), which won the Academy Award, the Golden Globe, and the BAFTA Award for Best Foreign Language Film.

His next films were Youth (2015), Loro (2018), and The Hand of God (2021), the latter of which was nominated for the Academy Award for Best International Feature Film. He is also known for creating and directing the HBO drama series The Young Pope (2016) and The New Pope (2019). He has worked with songwriters Antonello Venditti, Paloma Faith, and Mark Kozelek, and has written three books.

== Life and career ==
=== Early years and education ===
Sorrentino was born to a bank director and a housewife in the Arenella district of Naples and grew up in the Vomero district. He has a brother, Marco, and a sister, Daniela. He became an orphan at 16 after losing his parents to an accidental carbon monoxide leak in their Roccaraso mountain holiday house. He studied economics at the University of Naples Federico II but did not graduate. He is married to his childhood friend Daniela D'Antonio, a journalist. They have two children.

=== 1998–2012: Rise to prominence ===
His first film as a screenwriter, The Dust of Naples, was released in 1998. He also began directing short movies, including L'amore non ha confini in 1998 and La notte lunga in 2001. His feature-length debut was One Man Up, for which he was awarded the Nastro D'Argento prize.

He achieved international recognition in 2004 for his thriller The Consequences of Love. The film, which explores the mindset of a lonely businessman being used as a pawn by the Mafia, won many awards and was nominated for the Palme d'Or at the 2004 Cannes Film Festival. Sorrentino's next feature, The Family Friend, was shown at the Cannes Film Festival in May and the London Film Festival in October 2006; it tells the story of a malicious septuagenarian loan shark who develops a fixation with the daughter of one of his customers. Sorrentino made his acting debut the same year with a cameo appearance in Nanni Moretti's film The Caiman, which was also shown at the 2006 London Film Festival.

Sorrentino's following film, Il Divo (2008), is a dramatised biopic of Giulio Andreotti, a controversial Italian politician. The feature, which won the Prix du Jury at Cannes Film Festival, sees Sorrentino reunited with The Consequences of Love star Toni Servillo, who plays the part of Andreotti. In 2009, it was announced Sorrentino wrote the screenplay for a film version of Niccolò Ammaniti's novel Ti prendo e ti porto via (Steal You Away). This Must Be the Place (2011) marked the English-language feature debut of the Italian filmmaker. The plot centres on a middle-aged, wealthy rock star, played by two-time Academy Award winner Sean Penn, who becomes bored in his retirement and takes on the quest of finding the guard of the German camp where his father was imprisoned, who now lives in hiding in the United States. The film was co-written by Sorrentino and Umberto Contarello, and premiered in competition at the 2011 Cannes Film Festival.

=== 2013–present: Breakthrough and acclaim ===
His 2013 film The Great Beauty won the Oscar for Best Foreign Language Film in the 2014 Academy Awards. Jay Weissberg of Variety hailed the film as "a densely packed, often astonishing cinematic feast that honors Rome in all its splendor and superficiality." It won the Bafta award for Best Film Not in the English Language in the 67th British Academy Film Awards. It also won the Golden Globe for Best Foreign Language Film and was nominated for the Palme d'Or at the 2013 Cannes Film Festival. The film also received several accolades at the 2013 European Film Awards, including "Best Film" and "Best Director" for Sorrentino.

Sorrentino then directed Youth (2015), his second English-language film which features Michael Caine as a retired orchestra conductor. The film also starred Harvey Keitel, Rachel Weisz, and Jane Fonda. It competed for the Palme d'Or at the 2015 Cannes Film Festival. Kenneth Turan of NPR described the film as "a meditation on the wonders and complications of life, an examination of what matters to people, no matter what their age". Sorrentino received the Nastro d'Argento for Best Director.

In 2019, it was announced that Sorrentino would be directing Jennifer Lawrence as mob informant Arlyne Brickman in Mob Girl. The film is an adaptation of the book of the same name by Teresa Carpenter. Sorrentino will also be working as a co-producer on the film with Lawrence, as well as co-writing the screenplay.

Sorrentino's 2021 feature, The Hand of God, filmed in Naples, contains autobiographical elements. In an article about the film, The Guardian called it a coming of age story that was Sorrentino's "most personal" film to date, representing a departure from the detached style of some of his earlier work. Sorrentino also called the film "a completely different movie" in terms of style and, regarding the autobiographical elements, acknowledged that "almost everything is true." The film, which reunited Sorrentino with Toni Servillo, was selected as the Italian entry for the Academy Award for Best International Feature Film at the 94th Academy Awards. The film was nominated but ultimately lost to the Ryusuke Hamaguchi film Drive My Car (2021).

As announced in 2021, Sorrentino will next direct the biopic Sue starring and produced by Lawrence as well. The movie — to be written by Lauren Schuker Blum, Rebecca Angelo and John Logan — will chronicle the life of Hollywood agent Sue Mengers as Apple Studios backs the film. In a fierce bidding war for the film between Apple and Netflix, the package offers ranged from $80 million to $95 million for the budget. In 2023 it was reported Sorrentino was directing another "love letter to Naples", Parthenope, the cast to include Gary Oldman. He then directed La grazia (2025), a drama starring Toni Servillo, in which he plays a fictional Italian president nearing the end of his term.

In 2025, Sorrentino confirmed to Entertainment Weekly that the Jennifer Lawrence projects Mob Girl and Sue would not be going forward. In August 2025, he will be honoured with the Honorary Heart of Sarajevo Award for "outstanding contribution to the art of cinema". A retrospective of his films will also be featured as part of the 31st Sarajevo Film Festival's "Tribute To" program.

== Personal life ==
When asked about the influence of the Vatican on society, Sorrentino said he was a non-believer.

In 2015, Sorrentino was awarded an Honorary Doctorate of Humane Letters at the American University of Rome.

== Filmography ==
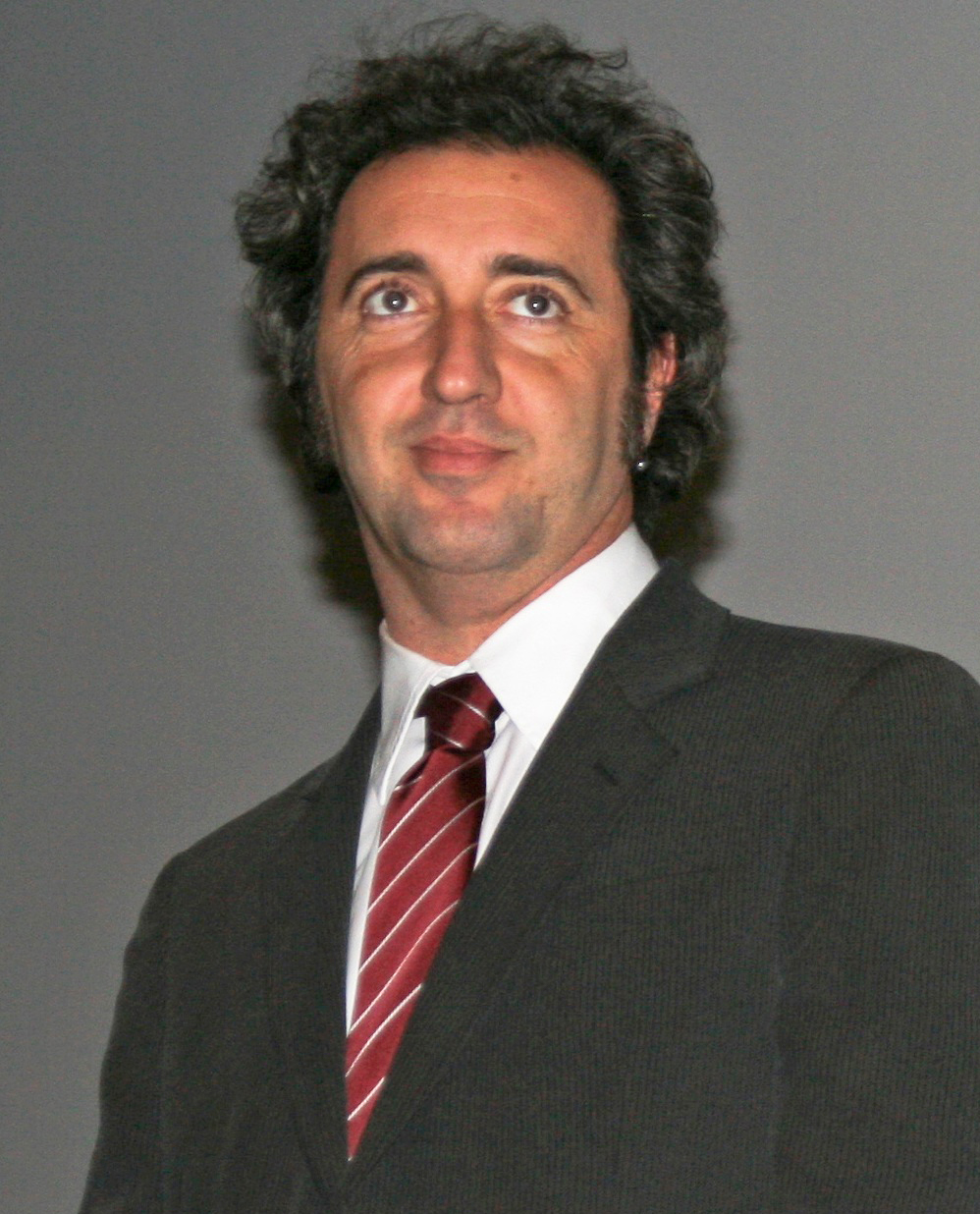
Sorrentino in 2008

=== Film ===
Feature films

| Year | Title | Director | Writer | Producer |
|---|---|---|---|---|
| 1998 | The Dust of Naples | No | Yes | No |
| 2001 | One Man Up | Yes | Yes | No |
| 2004 | The Consequences of Love | Yes | Yes | No |
| 2006 | The Family Friend | Yes | Yes | No |
| 2008 | Il Divo | Yes | Yes | No |
| 2011 | This Must Be The Place | Yes | Yes | No |
| 2013 | The Great Beauty | Yes | Yes | No |
| 2015 | Youth | Yes | Yes | No |
| 2018 | Loro | Yes | Yes | No |
| 2021 | The Hand of God | Yes | Yes | Yes |
| 2024 | Parthenope | Yes | Yes | Yes |
| 2025 | La grazia | Yes | Yes | Yes |

Short films and documentaries

| Year | Title | Director | Writer | Notes |
|---|---|---|---|---|
| 1994 | Un paradiso | Yes | Yes | Short film |
| 1998 | L'amore non ha confini | Yes | Yes | Short film |
| 2001 | La notte lunga | Yes | Yes | Short film |
| 2002 | La primavera del 2002. L'Italia protesta, l'Italia si ferma | Yes | No | Documentary |
| 2004 | Giovani talenti italiani | Yes | No | Documentary; Segment: Quando le cose vanno male |
| 2009 | La partita lenta | Yes | Yes | Short film |
| 2009 | L'Aquila 2009. Cinque registi tra le macerie | Yes | No | Documentary; Segment: L'assegnazione delle tende |
| 2010 | Napoli 24 | Yes | Yes | Documentary; Segment: La principessa di Napoli |
| 2011 | In the Mirror | Yes | Yes | Commercial for Yamamay |
| 2014 | La Fortuna | Yes | Yes | Segment from Rio, I Love You |
| 2014 | Sabbia | Yes | No | Commercial for Armani |
| 2014 | The Dream | Yes | Yes | Commercial for Bulgari |
| 2017 | Killer in Red | Yes | Yes | Commercial for Campari |

Acting roles

| Year | Title | Role |
|---|---|---|
| 2006 | The Caiman | Aida's Husband |
| 2009 | A Question of the Heart | Alberto's Friend |

=== Television ===
TV series

| Year | Title | Director | Writer | Executive producer | Notes |
|---|---|---|---|---|---|
| 2016 | The Young Pope | Yes | Yes | Yes | 10 episodes; also creator |
| 2018–2024 | My Brilliant Friend | | | Yes | |
| 2019 | The New Pope | Yes | Yes | Yes | 9 episodes; also creator |
| 2025– | M. Son of the Century | | | Yes | |

Other TV work

| Year | Title | Director | Writer | Role | Notes |
|---|---|---|---|---|---|
| 2000 | La squadra | | Yes | | 2 episodes |
| 2004 | Sabato, domenica e lunedì | Yes | | | Television film |
| 2010 | Boris | | | Himself | Episode: "Nella rete" |
| 2014 | Le voci di dentro | Yes | | | Television film |
| 2020 | Homemade | Yes | Yes | | Episode: "Voyage Au Bout De La Nuit" |
| 2021 | Cinque pezzi facili | Yes | | | 5 episodes |
| 2023 | Call My Agent - Italia | | | Himself | Season 1, episode 2 |

== Critical reception ==
| Year | Title | Rotten Tomatoes | Metacritic |
|---|---|---|---|
| 2001 | One Man Up | N/A | N/A |
| 2004 | The Consequences of Love | 80% (5 reviews) | N/A |
| 2006 | The Family Friend | 70% (10 reviews) | N/A |
| 2009 | Il divo | 92% (51 reviews) | 81% (17 reviews) |
| 2011 | This Must Be the Place | 66% (87 reviews) | 61% (29 reviews) |
| 2013 | The Great Beauty | 91% (135 reviews) | 86% (34 reviews) |
| 2015 | Youth | 72% (213 reviews) | 64% (41 reviews) |
| 2018 | Loro | 79% (77 reviews) | 56% (15 reviews) |
| 2021 | The Hand of God | 84% (158 reviews) | 76% (36 reviews) |
| 2024 | Parthenope | 46% (100 reviews) | 52% (27 reviews) |
| 2025 | La grazia | 75% (20 reviews) | 69% (12 reviews) |

== Bibliography ==
Novels

- Everybody's Right (Italian: Hanno tutti ragione) trans. Howard Curtis, Europa Editions, 2011)
- Gli aspetti irrilevanti (Mondadori, 2016)

Short stories

- Tony Pagoda e i suoi amici (Feltrinelli, 2012)
