= Loro (film) =

2018 Italian drama film

- Directed by: Paolo Sorrentino
- Written by: Paolo Sorrentino; Umberto Contarello
- Produced by: Francesca Cima; Nicola Giuliano
- Starring: Toni Servillo; Elena Sofia Ricci; Riccardo Scamarcio; Kasia Smutniak; Euridice Axen; Fabrizio Bentivoglio; Roberto De Francesco; Dario Cantarelli; Anna Bonaiuto; Giovanni Esposito; Ugo Pagliai; Ricky Memphis; Duccio Camerini; Yann Gael; Lorenzo Gioielli; Alice Pagani; Caroline Tillette; Mattia Sbragia; Max Tortora; Milva Marigliano; Roberto Herlitzka
- Cinematography: Luca Bigazzi
- Edited by: Cristiano Travaglioli
- Music by: Lele Marchitelli
- Production companies: Indigo Film; Pathé; France 2 Cinema; OCS; France Televisions; Direzione Generale Cinema; Regione Lazio; Sardegna Film Commission
- Distributed by: Focus Features; Universal Pictures (Italy); Pathé Distribution (France)
- Release dates: 24 April 2018 (Act 1); 10 May 2018 (Act 2); 13 September 2018 (U.S. cut)
- Running time: 204 minutes 100 minutes (Act 1); 104 minutes (Act 2); 145 minutes (U.S. cut)
- Countries: Italy; France
- Language: Italian
- Budget: $21 million
- Box office: $7.6 million

Loro is a two-part 2018 Italian drama film directed by Paolo Sorrentino from a screenplay he wrote with Umberto Contarello. Starring Toni Servillo, the film talks about a group of businessmen and politicians—the Loro (Them) from the title—who live and act near to media tycoon and politician Silvio Berlusconi. The film was released in two parts, Act 1 and Act 2, in Italy, and was condensed into a single two-hour film for its international release.

== Plot ==
=== Act 1 ===
Sergio Morra is a young businessman from Taranto who manages small-scale trafficking of young escorts which he uses to bribe local politicians and obtain licenses outside normal procedures. Sergio has a relationship with Tamara, an irresponsible young mother unscrupulous just like him, who helps him in his trafficking. The two decide to go to Rome, since Sergio wants to get close to power and aims to reach Silvio Berlusconi.

Once in Rome, Sergio meets the mysterious Kira, known as the Queen Bee because of her direct relation with Berlusconi. Meanwhile, Tamara becomes acquainted with former minister Santino Recchia. She flirts with the politician in order to help Sergio make contact with Berlusconi. Recchia wants to replace Berlusconi as leader of the centre-right coalition and asks deputy Cupa Caiafa if she is going to support him in the challenge of the party secretariat.

Sergio manages to gather many young escorts and rents an imposing villa in Sardinia that borders with Berlusconi's summer residence in order to get noticed by him. But Berlusconi is having a very difficult time: alone with his wife Veronica Lario, Berlusconi tries to engage her attentions, but Veronica is now very icy towards him. Diamonds, jokes or a song by the trusted Mariano Apicella are not enough to warm Veronica up again, that claims back her dignity.

Forza Italia is no longer in government and Berlusconi, left without government offices, has nothing to do, since his family businesses are now controlled by his children. One day, Recchia comes to Berlusconi pleading for help, since Tamara is blackmailing him, asking more money for Sergio, otherwise she will reveal that Recchia is betraying his wife. Berlusconi at first shows himself willing, but then he furiously reveals that he has known that Recchia wants to replace him. Then Berlusconi goes to Rome, telling Veronica that he is involved in political commitments, but he is actually participating in a fashion event with Noemi Letizia, a young and uninhibited girl.

Back at Sardinia, during a talk on his yacht where Veronica suggests that he take back Mike Bongiorno on TV, Berlusconi notices Morra's boat with many naked girls; despite a little interest, he decides to take a ride with Veronica on his watercraft, and after a sudden storm they return to the villa. Back there, Veronica asks Berlusconi if he remembers the song that was played on the day of their marriage: after pretending not to remember the song, Berlusconi demonstrates his affection to Veronica by summoning Fabio Concato, who sings Una domenica bestiale for her, the song that was played when they got married.

=== Act 2 ===
Ennio Doris, an entrepreneur and an old friend of Berlusconi, boasts of his wealth, praising at the same time the entrepreneurial genius of Berlusconi, who is more concerned that he has lost the elections by only 25,000 votes. Ennio suggests Berlusconi pass six senators to his side in order to bring down the centre-left government. Meanwhile, Veronica decides to leave Berlusconi for a while, announcing that she wants to travel to Cambodia. Berlusconi manages to persuade several senators to join his side by giving them money or helping them by giving a place to their girlfriends in films or TV productions. The government falls and Berlusconi wins the new elections.

The loneliness at his Sardinian villa pushes Berlusconi to give in to the requests from Sergio Morra whom he asks to help him organize a party in his villa by bringing as many girls as possible. The army of Morra's escorts are at first happy to be noticed by Berlusconi, but then they clash with a boring and disappointing reality. Kira tries to get some attention from Berlusconi, but she's not able to compete with Sergio and Tamara. After the party, Berlusconi only shows interest for a young girl, Stella, and tries to seduce her, but she refuses him and leaves with a controversial vein. Kira is not in Berlusconi's graces anymore and Sergio and Tamara understand that having arrived to Berlusconi has led to nothing.

As soon as Berlusconi becomes prime minister again, he has to face the consequences of the L'Aquila earthquake, showing up among the refugees and promising new houses for the needy. Nevertheless, his behavior in international meetings is embarrassing the highest authorities of Italy and Crepuscolo, one of Berlusconi's most trusted men, asks him to do his job more seriously. One day, Berlusconi is preparing to fly to New York City in order to talk at the United Nations, but once on the plane he decides to fly to Naples instead, to see Noemi Letizia on the day of her 18th birthday.

As more details about his dissolute behavior come out, Berlusconi finds himself at the centre of a political scandal and sees the allies of a lifetime, including Cupa Caiafa, leaving him. Veronica, back from Cambodia, announces to Berlusconi that she wants a divorce and a furious quarrel begins between the two of them. Crushed by political scandals and more isolated, Berlusconi finally invites Mike Bongiorno to his villa to dinner, even if the presenter is in the end dismissed without much regard. Once alone, Berlusconi activates the fake volcano in his garden, an attraction he said he would have shown to all his guests but that he actually never turned the power on.

Meanwhile in L'Aquila, refugees enter the new houses built for them by Berlusconi, while firefighters manage to recover a statue of Jesus Christ by extracting it from a church that was destroyed during the earthquake. The credits are accompanied by a long sequence of shots of the tired firefighters' faces after a long night of work.

== Cast ==
- Toni Servillo as Silvio Berlusconi and Ennio Doris
- Elena Sofia Ricci as Veronica Lario
- Riccardo Scamarcio as Sergio
- Kasia Smutniak as Kira (The Queen Bee)
- Euridice Axen as Tamara
- Fabrizio Bentivoglio as Santino Recchia
- Roberto De Francesco as Fabrizio Sala
- Dario Cantarelli as Paolo Spagnolo
- Anna Bonaiuto as Cupa Caiafa
- Roberto Herlitzka as Crepuscolo
- Ricky Memphis as Riccardo Pasta
- Yann Gael as Michel Martinez
- Alice Pagani as Stella
- Giovanni Esposito as Mariano Apicella
- Ugo Pagliai as Mike Bongiorno
- Max Tortora as Martino
- Fabio Concato as himself
- Paolo Buglioni as Ernesto Morra, Sergio's father

== Production ==
The screenplay was co-written by Paolo Sorrentino and Umberto Contarello. The title Loro is Italian for "them", but also a word play on l'oro, meaning "the gold". The film is produced through Indigo Film and co-produced by France's Pathé. An obstacle was that Sorrentino's usual Italian co-financier Medusa Film, which is controlled by Berlusconi, was not willing to participate in this production. Filming took place in Rome and Tuscany. Actress Kasia Smutniak said the most difficult scene for her was the one in which she dances completely nude on a table, with a hundred people in front of her, in an open-air villa. In an interview to Il Messaggero, she recalled: "I remember the faces of the extras, how I couldn't look into their eyes at the end of the scene because of my embarrassment. They seemed to think how strong and uninhibited I was. Quite the contrary. I hope to never see them again... "

== Release ==
In June 2017, Focus Features acquired distribution rights to the film in Italy, planning to release it through parent company Universal Pictures' distribution services in the country. In Italy, the film came out in theatres in two acts: the first act, called Loro 1, came out on 24 April 2018, while the second act, Loro 2, came out on 10 May 2018. On 7 August 2018, a new 145-minute cut of Loro was announced for release on 13 September 2018. This new international cut was made in order to allow the movie to run for the 91st Academy Awards. In the United Kingdom, Loro was released on 19 April 2019 by Curzon Artificial Eye. In the United States, it was released on 20 September 2019 by IFC Films.

== Critical reception ==
The Guardian called Loro "a strange and intriguing film". Peter Bradshaw called it "a flawed, undigested film that, like Sorrentino's movie Youth, is knowingly indulgent of old men's foibles." Writing in the same newspaper, Wendy Ide found fault as well but was struck by the final "profoundly moving scene". On Rotten Tomatoes, the film holds an approval rating of 79%, with an average rating of 6.5/10, based on 75 reviews. The website's critical consensus reads: "Loro uses the larger-than-life exploits of an infamous public figure to present a messily compelling snapshot of how power attracts -- and corrupts." On Metacritic, the film has a weighted average score of 55 out of 100, based on 14 critics, indicating "mixed or average" reviews.

== Awards ==
David di Donatello Awards (2019)

- David di Donatello for Best Actress to Elena Sofia Ricci
- David di Donatello for Best Hairstyling to Aldo Signoretti
- Nomination for David di Donatello for Best Actor to Toni Servillo
- Nomination for David di Donatello for Best Supporting Actor to Fabrizio Bentivoglio
- Nomination for David di Donatello for Best Supporting Actress to Kasia Smutniak
- Nomination for David di Donatello for Best Production Design to Stefania Cella
- Nomination for David di Donatello for Best Costumes to Carlo Poggioli
- Nomination for David di Donatello for Best Make-up to Maurizio Silvi
- Nomination for David di Donatello for Best Digital Effects to Simone Coco
- Nomination for David di Donatello for Best Sound
- Nomination for David di Donatello for Best Score to Lele Marchitelli
- Nomination for David di Donatello for Best Original Song to Lele Marchitelli and Peppe Servillo ("Na Gelosia")

Nastro d'Argento Awards (2018)

- Nastro d'Argento for Best Actress to Elena Sofia Ricci
- Nastro d'Argento for Best Supporting Actor to Riccardo Scamarcio
- Nastro d'Argento for Best Supporting Actress to Kasia Smutniak
- Nastro d'Argento for Best Screenplay to Paolo Sorrentino and Umberto Contarello
- Guglielmo Biraghi Award to Euridice Axen
- Nomination for Nastro d'Argento for Best Picture
- Nomination for Nastro d'Argento for Best Director to Paolo Sorrentino
- Nomination for Nastro d'Argento for Best Producer to Indigo Film, Nicola Giuliano, Francesca Cima, Carlotta Calori and Viola Prestieri
- Nomination for Nastro d'Argento for Best Actor to Toni Servillo
- Nomination for Nastro d'Argento for Best Cinematography to Luca Bigazzi
- Nomination for Nastro d'Argento for Best Costumes to Carlo Poggioli
- Nomination for Nastro d'Argento for Best Editing to Cristiano Travaglioli
- Nomination for Nastro d'Argento for Best Score to Lele Marchitelli
