= One Man Up =

2001 film by Paolo Sorrentino

- Directed by: Paolo Sorrentino
- Written by: Paolo Sorrentino
- Starring: Toni Servillo
- Cinematography: Pasquale Mari
- Edited by: Giogiò Franchini
- Music by: Pasquale Catalano
- Release date: 2001
- Country: Italy
- Language: Italian

One Man Up (Italian: L'uomo in più) is a 2001 Italian comedy-drama film. It entered the "Cinema del presente" section at the 58th Venice International Film Festival. It marked the directorial debut of Paolo Sorrentino, who was awarded Nastro d'Argento for Best New Director. The film also won the Ciak d'oro for the script and the Grolla d'oro to actor Toni Servillo.

== Plot ==
Set during the eighties, the film charts the decline of two men both named Antonio Pisapia who lead entirely separate yet strangely parallel lives. One is a pop singer who finds himself washed up after a sex scandal ends his run of success; the other a football hero whose playing career is abruptly cut short by injury.

== Cast ==
- Toni Servillo - Antonio "Tony" Pisapia
- Andrea Renzi - Antonio Pisapia
- Nello Mascia - Il Molosso
- Ninni Bruschetta - Genny
- Angela Goodwin - Mother of Tony
- Roberto De Francesco - Gigi Moscati
- Peppe Lanzetta - Salvatore

== See also ==
- List of Italian films of 2001
