= The Family Friend =

- Directed by: Paolo Sorrentino
- Written by: Paolo Sorrentino
- Produced by: Francesca Cima; Fabio Conversi; Domenico Procacci; Nicola Giuliano
- Starring: Giacomo Rizzo
- Cinematography: Luca Bigazzi
- Edited by: Giogiò Franchini
- Music by: Teho Teardo
- Production companies: Fandango; Indigo Film
- Release date: 2006
- Running time: 102 minutes 110 minutes
- Country: Italy
- Language: Italian

The Family Friend (Italian: L'amico di famiglia) is a 2006 Italian film directed by Paolo Sorrentino. It was entered into the 2006 Cannes Film Festival.

== Plot ==
Never confuse the unusual with the impossible.

— Geremia de' Geremei

Geremia de’ Geremei, an aging tailor, lives in Sabaudia, in the Pontine Marshes, in a modest house with his bedridden elderly mother. He runs a small tailoring shop as a front for his real activity as a loan shark, like his father, who abandoned him when he was 9. Geremia is cynical and ruthless when it comes to ensuring respect, and attentive, in his own interest, to helping only those who will somehow be able to repay him. For his morbid and obsessive interest in his clients' problems, he is nicknamed Geremia “Cuoredoro“ (Heart-of-Gold) and becomes a “family friend“, introducing into his clients' lives till their debt is fully repaied. Amassing money is not his only passion; Geremia has a weakness for gianduiotto chocolates and an unhealthy, obsessive relationship with women. Supporting him in his work, in addition to two brawny twin brothers who act as his henchmen, is Gino, his faithful informer from Veneto with a passion for country music, who dresses like a cowboy and lives in a camper van, and who dreams of one day moving to Tennessee after losing his fiancée in a car crash years ago.

Among his clients, a father, Saverio, steps forward who does not have the means to contribute to the expenses for his daughter’s wedding. Geremia “takes the case to heart” when he sees the bride-to-be, an impertinent beauty queen named Rosalba. The girl does not concern herself with financial problems, nor does she in fact have any particular demands regarding the wedding. However, when she realises the reason why this "family friend," of whose existence she was unaware, has suddenly appeared in their home, she flies into a rage. Her father then explains to her that the family’s resources are practically nonexistent, and that in order to make the imminent wedding at least dignified, he must submit to yet another humiliation, after the many already endured precisely so that she could be raised in comfort. Thus, on the very morning of the wedding, under the pretext of a repair to her dress, the loan shark visits the young woman, who gives herself to him in exchange for a drastic reduction in the usury rate.

Geremia is subsequently approached with a very tempting proposal. An industrialist with credit problems, Giulio Montanaro, is about to close a sensational deal but immediately needs one million euros. He would even be able to repay double the amount in a very short time. Accustomed to small loans, always excessively guaranteed, “Heart-of-Gold” surprisingly ends up accepting, despite the fact that he has been advised against it by Gino and, above all, by his mother. Contributing to his bite being bigger than he can chew is also the euphoric state that follows his renewed encounter with the young newlywed who, when he sees her again after some time, first rejects his advances and then unexpectedly offers herself to him, declaring that she is in love. Once the deal is done, the greedy loan shark opens his eyes: Gino, his thugs, and the girl have deceived him, setting up the entire affair by hiring a few small-time actors, and now they have disappeared. With the death of his mother and the loss of all his possessions, Geremia is now even more alone in the world. In the last scene, Geremia is seen searching valuables with a metal detector in the beach of Sabaudia, suggesting that he will start to amass money again.

== Cast ==
- Giacomo Rizzo - Geremia de' Geremei
- Fabrizio Bentivoglio - Gino
- Laura Chiatti - Rosalba De Luca
- Gigi Angelillo - Saverio De Luca
- Marco Giallini - Attanasio
- Barbara Valmorin - Granny at Bingo
- Luisa De Santis - Silvia
- Clara Bindi - Geremia's mother
- Roberta Fiorentini - Saverio's wife
- Elia Schilton - Teasuro
- Lorenzo Gioielli - Montanaro
- Emilio De Marchi - Chef
- Giorgio Colangeli - Massa
- Fabio Grossi - Saverio's brother-in-law
- Lucia Ragni - Cashier at the supermarket
