= The Consequences of Love =

- Directed by: Paolo Sorrentino
- Written by: Paolo Sorrentino
- Produced by: Francesca Cima; Angelo Curti; Nicola Giuliano; Domenico Procacci
- Starring: Toni Servillo; Olivia Magnani; Adriano Giannini; Gianna Paola Scaffidi; Raffaele Pisu
- Cinematography: Luca Bigazzi
- Edited by: Giogiò Franchini
- Music by: Pasquale Catalano
- Production companies: Indigo Film; Fandango
- Release date: 2004
- Running time: 100 minutes
- Country: Italy
- Language: Italian

The Consequences of Love (Italian: Le Conseguenze dell'Amore) is a 2004 Italian psychological thriller film written and directed by Paolo Sorrentino. It stars Toni Servillo, Olivia Magnani, Adriano Giannini, Gianna Paola Scaffidi, and Raffaele Pisu. In the film, Titta Di Girolamo (Servillo), a mysterious and brooding Italian ex-businessman, begins a relationship with Sofia (Magnani), the barmaid at the Swiss hotel where he lives.

The film competed at the 2004 Cannes Film Festival. It won five David di Donatello awards including Best Film, Best Director and Best Actor. It was also the first film to achieve widespread critical acclaim for Sorrentino.

== Plot ==
Titta Di Girolamo is a middle-aged loner who has spent the last eight years living in an upmarket hotel in Lugano, Switzerland. Every day he puts on his suit and wanders around, avoiding contact with people. In the morning, he solves the chess puzzles in the paper and in the evening he plays Grabber with a bankrupt aristocratic couple who are marooned in the hotel they used to own. Occasionally, he rings his family in Italy but his wife is always reluctant to talk, and his grown-up children despise him. He develops feelings for Sofia, the beautiful and stylish waitress at the bar of the hotel but he refuses to speak to her because, in his shyness, he fears that love would complicate his monotone but quiet life.

The reasons behind Titta's strange existence gradually become apparent. Eight years ago, it is revealed, Titta was a broker who invested large sums of money. One day, he invested 250 billion Italian liras on behalf of Cosa Nostra, losing 220 billions in a few hours. By way of punishment, Titta was forced to live for the rest of his life as a mafia pawn, making regular deliveries of suitcases full of money to a Swiss bank.

Titta's other secret is that he is a heroin user. Every Wednesday at ten a.m., he goes up to his hotel room and injects himself with the drug.

One day, things start to happen: Titta's gregarious younger stepbrother turns up. He encourages Titta to engage with Sofia more. Later, two Mafia men suddenly arrive in his hotel room, which they intend to use as a base in order to carry out an assassination. As the two gangsters leave, they notice the suitcase containing the money that Titta must deliver that week. Sofia and Titta begin an awkward relationship which is romantic but not sexual. They go shopping together, and Titta buys her some shoes.

Meanwhile, during Titta's trip to the bank that week, the bank staff counting the money by hand discover that there is $100,000 missing. Titta is already aware of this, but calmly pretends to be disgusted at their "mistake" and asks to close his account. His bluff achieves the intended result: in order to avoid offending him, and partly out of fear of the Mafia, the bank staff pretend that they miscounted, and so his theft goes unreported.

It eventually turns out that Titta has stolen the money in order to buy an expensive car for Sofia. She is initially appalled by this gift, as she feels she does not know him well enough, but later comes up to his room to apologise and to try to discover more about him. Titta reveals all his secrets to her, and Sofia is so touched that she offers to celebrate his 50th birthday with him on the following evening. He accepts.

The next day, the two Mafia assassins return and steal that week's suitcase. Titta panics and immediately telephones his Mafia contact, Pippo, who tells him to fly to Southern Italy that day to explain, but Titta says he will arrive in two days because he has an appointment to keep. However, when Sofia fails to turn up to celebrate his birthday, a despondent Titta, thinking that no-one loves him, leaves for the airport early. In reality, Sofia does not turn up because she has been in a car crash, and her ambulance passes Titta's car on the way out of town.

Arriving at his destination, Titta is taken to a nearby hotel and, after waiting in a guestroom, is interrogated by the boss. Titta explains that he has recovered the money [in a flashback we see that when the money was initially stolen by the two men, Titta regained his composure, grabbed his gun and switched off the power for the elevator, forcing them to use the stairs as a getaway. This slowed them down, and Titta was able to use the lift himself to get to the carpark ahead of them. He hid in his car, and killed the duo when they arrived].

The boss asks Titta why he did not just deposit the money and save himself a trip, but Titta tells him that he does not want to give it back, because they stole his life. At this point, the Mafia boss ominously tells a subordinate to transfer Titta's account to someone else before asking Titta to tell him where the money is. Titta again refuses. He is led away by guards and the next morning is taken to a building site. Here he is suspended from a crane above a container of fresh concrete, and told that unless he reveals the money's whereabouts, he will be drowned in the concrete. As he has already given the money to the elderly aristocrats in the hotel, he refuses.

The film ends with Titta being lowered into the concrete and thinking of his long-lost best friend Dino, who works as an electrician in the Alps.

== Cast ==
- Toni Servillo – Titta Di Girolamo
- Olivia Magnani – Sofia
- Adriano Giannini – Valerio
- Antonio Ballerio – Bank manager
- Gianna Paola Scaffidi – Giulia
- Nino D'Agata – Natale
- Vincenzo Vitagliano – Pippo D'Antò (as Enzo Vitagliano)
- Diego Ribon – Director
- Gilberto Idonea – Hired assassin
- Giselda Volodi – Waitress
- Giovanni Vettorazzo – Letizia
- Gaetano Bruno – Hired assassin
- Ana Valeria Dini – Reader
- Vittorio Di Prima – Nitto Lo Riccio
- Raffaele Pisu – Carlo
- Angela Goodwin – Isabella
- Rolando Ravello – Man with bow tie

== Reception ==
The review aggregator website Rotten Tomatoes reported an 80% approval rating, based on six critic reviews, with a weighted average rating of 7.3/10.

The film is noted for its extremely stylish cinematography. The most memorable scene features Titta injecting himself with heroin and sees the camera flip 180 degrees as it follows Titta's falling head. Brian Gibson at Vue Weekly affirms that "style becomes substance; cuts and angles create narrative, the screen's surface opens up depths" pointing out this scene as well as "gliding cameras, illusions of angle, and depth of field [which make] glimpses of human behaviour emerge". According to him, the soundtrack emphasises "the coolness and strangeness of a coldly financial Switzerland—a Dante-like purgatory for Titta".

On the other hand, Richard M. Porton at Chicago Reader argues that "Sorrentino's often playful assault on genre conventions is sabotaged by an ostentatious visual style that [...] is little more than a bag of empty tricks."

Critics have also praised the film's tracking shots and the opening sequence, which depicts a bright white corridor: Anton Bitel on Eye for Film writes that "with simple economy, this scene [...] establishes several key features of the film, for it encapsulates Titta's status as an aloof observer, cocooned from the 'street level' of everyday human affairs, as well as affording an early glimpse of the catastrophic disorder that desire can bring."

== Soundtrack ==
Le conseguenze dell'amore

Soundtrack album by Various artists
- Released: 2004
- Studio: Amarcord Studio, Naples
- Genre: Electronic music, Post-rock, Film score
- Length: 67:53
- Label: Radiofandango

The film's soundtrack uses atmospheric electronica and post-rock music, with songs from bands including Mogwai, Lali Puna, Boards of Canada, Terranova and music by Pasquale Catalano specifically written for the film.

=== Track listing ===
No.	Title	Music	Length
1.	"Intro"	Pasquale Catalano	1:17
2.	"Scary World Theory"	Lali Puna	4:45
3.	"Moses? I Amn't"	Mogwai	3:00
4.	"Hello"	James	4:38
5.	"Titta"	Pasquale Catalano	3:47
6.	"Scoop Rmx"	Isan	5:12
7.	"Arab Skank"	Grand Popo Football Club	3:51
8.	"Rossetto e cioccolato"	Ornella Vanoni	4:01
9.	"Le conseguenze dell'amore"	Pasquale Catalano	7:32
10.	"Terapia interrotta"	Francesco Forni	2:39
11.	"Remegio"	Isan	6:47
12.	"Concepts"	Terranova	3:31
13.	"Gyroscope"	Boards of Canada	3:37
14.	"Satur-Nine"	Lali Puna	1:32
15.	"La cava"	Pasquale Catalano	2:42
16.	"Subtle Body"	Fila Brazillia	9:02
Total length:			67:53
