= 67th David di Donatello =

2022 Italian film awards

- Date: 3 May 2022
- Site: Cinecittà; Rome, Italy
- Hosted by: Carlo Conti; Drusilla Foer

Highlights
- Best Picture: The Hand of God
- Most awards: Freaks Out (6)
- Most nominations: The Hand of God and Freaks Out (16)

Television coverage
- Network: Rai 1
- Duration: 2 hours, 37 minutes

The 67th David di Donatello ceremony, presented by the Accademia del Cinema Italiano, honored the best in Italian cinema released from 1 March 2021 to 28 February 2022 at Cinecittà Studios in Rome. The ceremony was hosted by presenters Carlo Conti and Drusilla Foer.

Drama film The Hand of God won five awards, including Best Film. Meanwhile, historical-fantasy film Freaks Out won the most awards with six.

== Winners and nominees ==
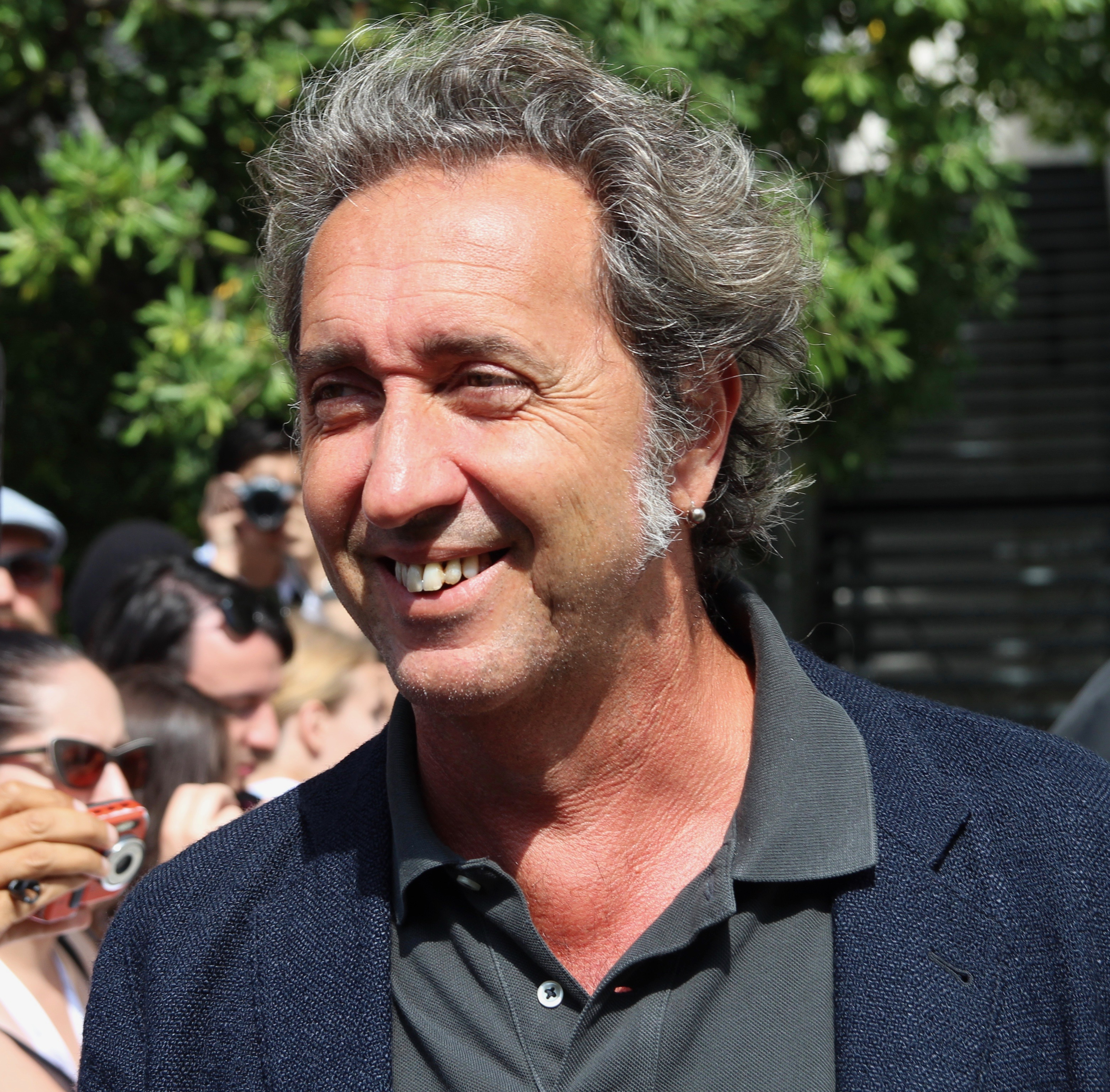
Paolo Sorrentino, Best Picture and Best Director winner

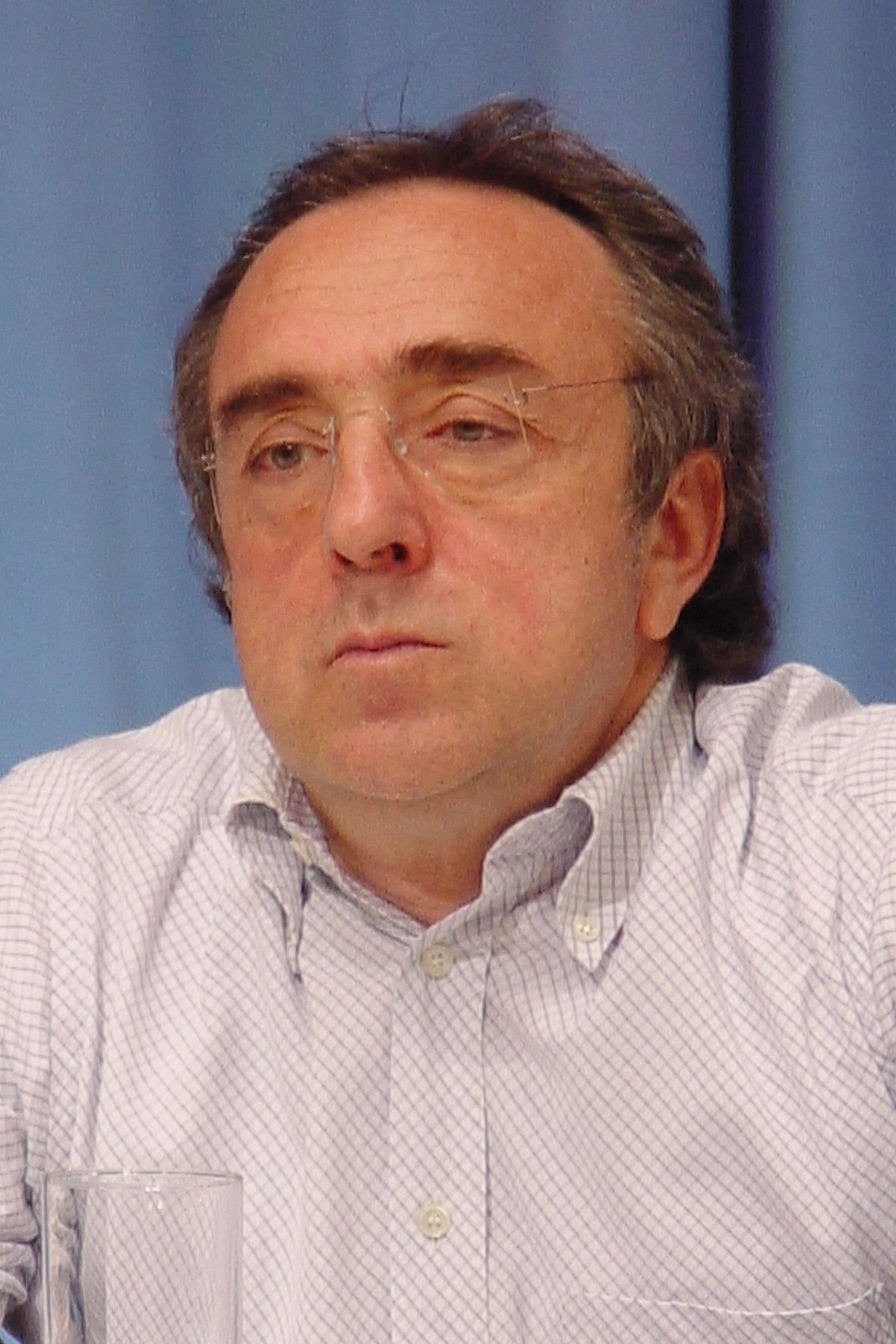
Silvio Orlando, Best Actor winner

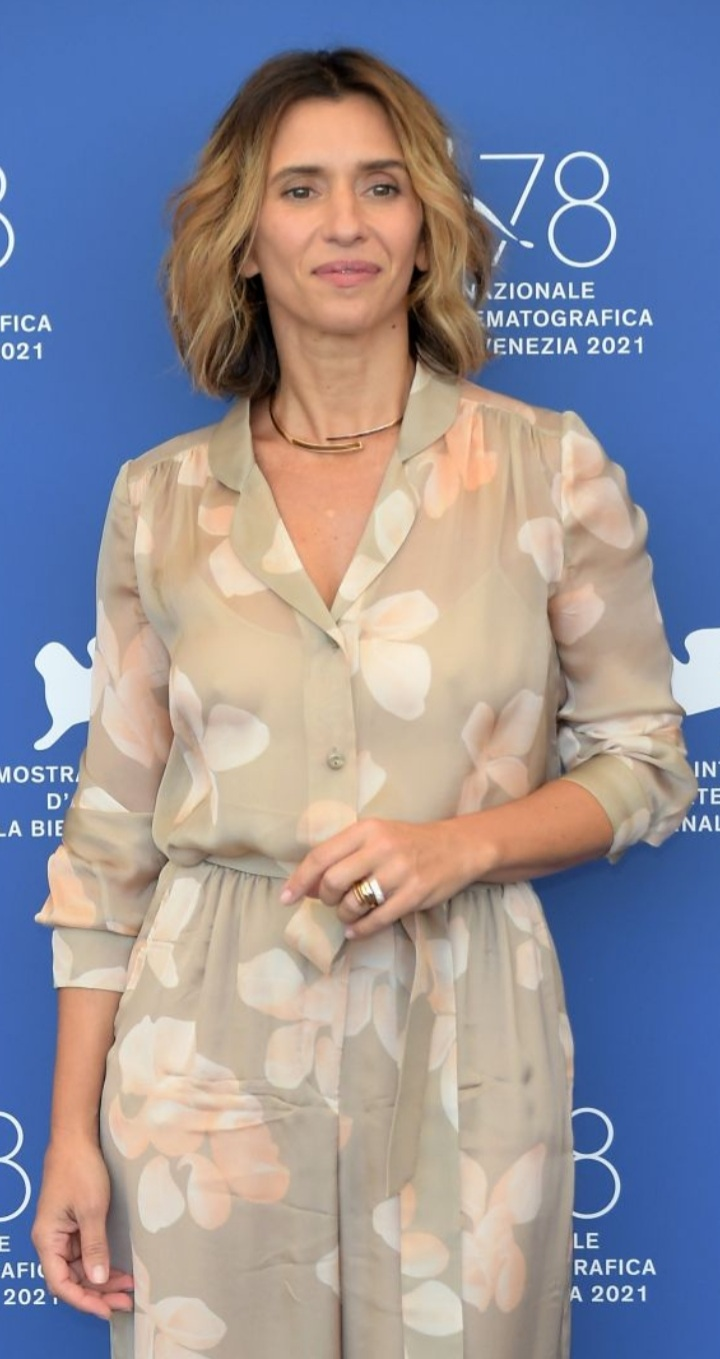
Teresa Saponangelo, Best Supporting Actress winner

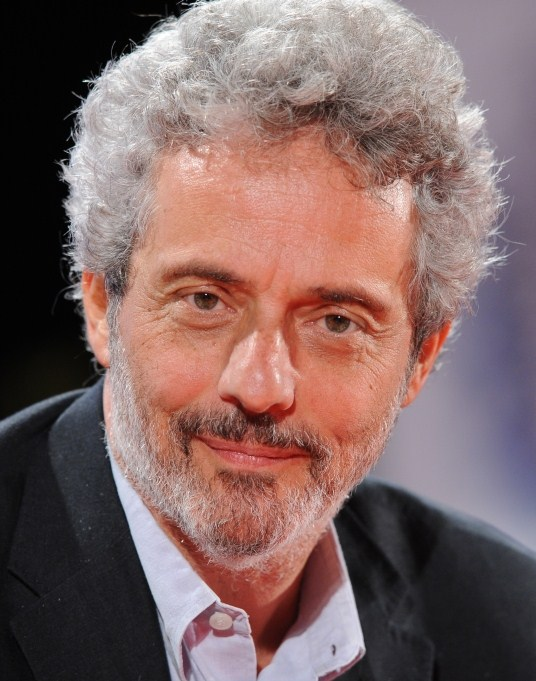
Nicola Piovani, Best Score winner

Winners are listed first, highlighted in boldface, and indicated with a double dagger (‡). The nominations were announced on 4 April 2022.

**Best Film**: **The Hand of God – Paolo Sorrentino, director**‡; Ennio – Giuseppe Tornatore, director; Freaks Out – Gabriele Mainetti, director; The Inner Cage – Leonardo Di Costanzo, director; The King of Laughter – Mario Martone, director	**Best Producer**: **Freaks Out – Andrea Occhipinti, Stefano Massenzi, Mattia Guerra and Gabriele Mainetti, producers; Goon Films, Lucky Red, Rai Cinema and Gapbusters, production companies**‡; A Chiara – Jon Coplon, Ryan Zacarias, Paolo Carpignano and Jonas Carpignano, producers; Stayblack Productions and Rai Cinema, production companies; The Hand of God – Paolo Sorrentino and Lorenzo Mieli, producers; The Apartment, production company; The Inner Cage – Carlo Cresto-Dina and Michela Pini, producers; Tempesta, AMKA and Rai Cinema, production companies; The King of Laughter – Nicola Giuliano, Francesca Cima and Carlotta Calori, producers; Indigo Film and Rai Cinema, production companies
**Best Director**: **Paolo Sorrentino – The Hand of God**‡; Gabriele Mainetti – Freaks Out; Giuseppe Tornatore – Ennio; Leonardo Di Costanzo – The Inner Cage; Mario Martone – The King of Laughter	**Best New Director**: **Laura Samani – Small Body**‡; Alessio Rigo de Righi and Matteo Zoppis – The Tale of King Crab; Francesco Costabile – Una Femmina: The Code of Silence; Gianluca Jodice – The Bad Poet; Maura Delpero – Maternal
**Best Actor**: **Silvio Orlando – The Inner Cage as Carmine Lagidia**‡; Elio Germano – America Latina as Massimo Sisti; Filippo Scotti – The Hand of God as Fabietto Schisa; Franz Rogowski – Freaks Out as Franz; Toni Servillo – The King of Laughter as Eduardo Scarpetta	**Best Actress**: **Swamy Rotolo – A Chiara as Chiara**‡; Aurora Giovinazzo – Freaks Out as Matilde; Maria Nazionale – The King of Laughter as Rosa de Filippo-Scarpetta; Miriam Leone – Diabolik as Eva Kant; Rosa Palasciano – Giulia as Giulia
**Best Supporting Actor**: **Eduardo Scarpetta – The King of Laughter as Vincenzo Scarpetta**‡; Fabrizio Ferracane – The Inner Cage as Franco Coletti; Pietro Castellitto – Freaks Out as Cencio; Toni Servillo – The Hand of God as Saverio Schisa; Valerio Mastandrea – Diabolik as Ginko	**Best Supporting Actress**: **Teresa Saponangelo – The Hand of God as Maria Schisa**‡; Cristiana Dell'Anna – The King of Laughter as Luisa de Filippo; Luisa Ranieri – The Hand of God as Patrizia; Susy Del Giudice – I fratelli De Filippo as Luisa de Filippo; Vanessa Scalera – A Girl Returned as Mother
**Best Original Screenplay**: **The Inner Cage – Leonardo Di Costanzo, Bruno Oliviero and Valia Santella**‡; A Chiara – Jonas Carpignano; Freaks Out – Nicola Guaglianone and Gabriele Mainetti; The Hand of God – Paolo Sorrentino; The King of Laughter – Mario Martone and Ippolita di Majo	**Best Adapted Screenplay**: **A Girl Returned – Monica Zapelli and Donatella Di Pietrantonio; based on the novel by Di Pietrantonio**‡; The Catholic School – Massimo Gaudioso, Luca Infascelli and Stefano Mordini; based on the novel by Edoardo Albinati; Diabolik – Manetti Bros. and Michelangelo La Neve; based on the comic series by Angela and Luciana Giussani; Land of the Sons – Filippo Gravino, Guido Iuculano and Claudio Cupellini; based on the graphic novel by Gipi; Three Floors – Nanni Moretti, Valia Santella and Federica Pontremoli; based on the novel Shalosh Qomot by Eshkol Nevo; Una Femmina: The Code of Silence – Lirio Abbate, Serena Brugnolo, Adriano Chiarelli and Francesco Costabile; based on the book Fimmine ribelli by Abbate
**Best Cinematography**: **Freaks Out – Michele D'Attanasio**‡; **The Hand of God – Daria D'Antonio**‡; America Latina – Paolo Carnera; The Inner Cage – Luca Bigazzi; The King of Laughter – Renato Berta	**Best Production Design**: **Freaks Out – Massimiliano Sturiale and Ilaria Fallacara**‡; Diabolik – Noemi Marchica and Maria Michela De Domenico; The Hand of God – Carmine Guarino and Iole Autero; The Inner Cage – Luca Servino and Susanna Abenavoli; The King of Laughter – Giancarlo Muselli, Carlo Rescigno, Laura Casalini and Francesco Fonda
**Best Score**: **I fratelli De Filippo – Nicola Piovani**‡; America Latina – Verdena; A Chiara – Dan Romer and Benh Zeitlin; Diabolik – Pivio and Aldo De Scalzi; Freaks Out – Michele Braga and Gabriele Mainetti; The Inner Cage – Pasquale Scialo	**Best Original Song**: **"La profondità degli abissi" from Diabolik – Music, Lyrics and Performed by Manuel Agnelli**‡; "Faccio 'A Polka" from I fratelli De Filippo – Music by Nicola Piovani; Lyrics by Nicola Piovani and Dodo Gagliarde; Performed by Anna Ferraioli Ravel; "Just You" from A Girl Returned – Music and Lyrics by Giuliano Taviani and Carmelo Travia; Performed by Marianna Travia; "Nei tuoi occhi" from Marilyn's Eyes – Music by Francesca Michielin and Andrea Farri; Lyrics and Performed by Francesca Michielin; "Piccolo corpo" from Small Body – Music by Fredrika Stahl; Lyrics by Laura Samani; Performed by Celeste Cescutti and choir
**Best Editing**: **Ennio – Massimo Quaglia and Annalisa Schillaci**‡; A Chiara – Affonso Gonçalves; The Hand of God – Cristiano Travaglioli; The Inner Cage – Carlotta Cristiani; The King of Laughter – Jacopo Quadri	**Best Sound**: **Ennio – Gilberto Martinelli, Fabio Venturi, Francesco Vallocchia and Gianni Pallotto**‡; Freaks Out – Angelo Bonanni, Diego de Santis, Davide Favargiotti, Mirko Perri and Franco Piscopo; The Hand of God – Emanuele Cecere, Francesco Sabez, Silvia Moraes, Mirko Perri and Michele Mazzucco; The Inner Cage – Xavier Lavorel, Pierre Collodin, Daniela Bassani and Maxence Ciekawy; The King of Laughter – Alessandro Zanon, Alessandro Palmerini, Silvia Moraes, Gianluca Gasparrini and Giancarlo Rutigliano
**Best Costumes**: **The King of Laughter – Ursula Patzak**‡; Diabolik – Ginevra De Carolis; Freaks Out – Mary Montalto; The Hand of God – Mariano Tufano; I fratelli De Filippo – Maurizio Millenotti	**Best Visual Effects**: **Freaks Out – Stefano Leoni**‡; A Classic Horror Story – Nuccio Canino; Diabolik – Simone Silvestri; The Hand of God – Rodolfo Migliari; Land of the Sons – Rodolfo Migliari and Roberto Saba
**Best Make-up**: **Freaks Out – Diego Prestopino, Emanuele de Luca and Davide de Luca**‡; Diabolik – Francesca Lodoli; The Hand of God – Vincenzo Mastrantonio; I fratelli De Filippo – Maurizio Nardi; The King of Laughter – Alessandro D'Anna	**Best Hairstyling**: **Freaks Out – Marco Perna**‡; 7 Women and a Murder – Alberta Giuliani; A Chiara – Giuseppina Rotolo; Diabolik – Luca Pompozzi; I fratelli De Filippo – Francesco Pegoretti
**Best Documentary**: **Ennio – Giuseppe Tornatore, director**‡; Atlantide – Yuri Ancarani, director; Futura – Alice Rohrwacher, Francesco Munzi and Pietro Marcello, directors; Marx Can Wait – Marco Bellocchio, director; Onde radicali – Gianfranco Pannone, director	**Best Short Film**: **Maestrale – Nico Bonomolo, director**‡; Closing Time – Tommaso Santambrogio, director; Diorama – Camilla Carè, director; Pilgrims – Farnoosh Samadi and Ali Asgari, directors; Roman Nights – Valerio Ferrara, director
**Best International Film**: **Belfast – Kenneth Branagh, director**‡; Don't Look Up – Adam McKay, director; Drive My Car – Ryusuke Hamaguchi, director; Dune – Denis Villeneuve, director; The Power of the Dog – Jane Campion, director	**David Youth Award**: **The Hand of God – Paolo Sorrentino, director**‡; Diabolik – Manetti Bros., directors; Ennio – Giuseppe Tornatore, director; Freaks Out – Gabriele Mainetti, director; Like a Cat on a Highway 2 – Riccardo Milani, director
**Special David Awards**: **Giovanna Ralli** (Career David); **Sabrina Ferilli**; **Antonio Capuano**	**David Audience Award**: **Me contro Te: Il film - Il mistero della scuola incantata for garnering 805,559 spectators**

== Films with multiple nominations and awards ==
Films that received multiple nominations
Nominations	Film
16	Freaks Out
16	The Hand of God
14	The King of Laughter
11	Diabolik
11	The Inner Cage
6	A Chiara
6	Ennio
6	I fratelli De Filippo
3	America Latina
3	A Girl Returned
2	Small Body
2	Land of the Sons
2	Una Femmina: The Code of Silence

Films that received multiple awards
Awards	Film
6	Freaks Out
5	The Hand of God
3	Ennio
2	The Inner Cage
2	The King of Laughter
