= David di Donatello for Best Adapted Screenplay =

Italian film award

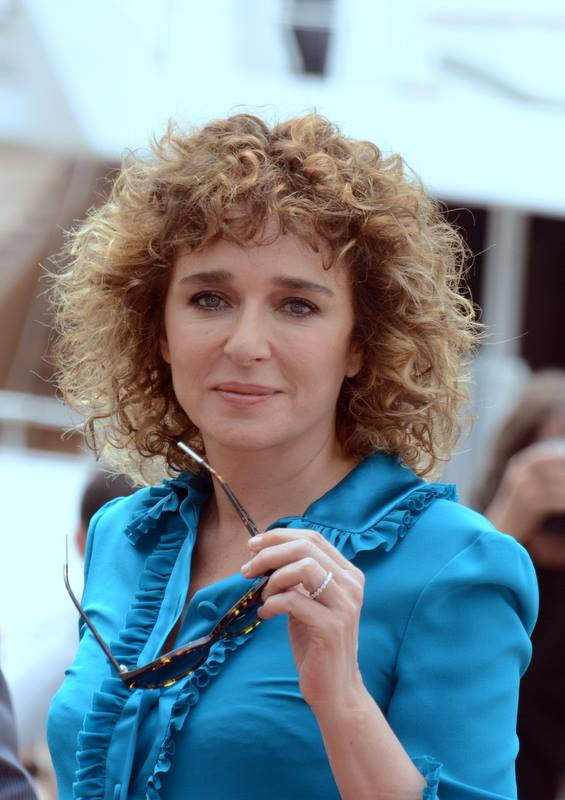
- 2025 co-recipient: Valeria Golino
- Country: Italy
- Presented by: Accademia del Cinema Italiano
- First award: 2017
- Currently held by: Valeria Golino, Luca Infascelli, Francesca Marciano, Valia Santella and Stefano Sardo for The Art of Joy (2025)
- Website: www.daviddidonatello.it

The David di Donatello for Best Adapted Screenplay (Italian: David di Donatello per la migliore sceneggiatura non originale) is an award presented annually by the Accademia del Cinema Italiano since 2017. Together with the David di Donatello for Best Original Screenplay, it replaced the integrated David di Donatello for Best Screenplay (1975–2016).

== Winners and nominees ==
=== 2010s ===
Year	English title	Original title	Screenwriter(s)
2017 (62nd)	The Stuff of Dreams	La stoffa dei sogni	Gianfranco Cabiddu, Ugo Chiti and Salvatore De Mola
2017 (62nd)	Era d'estate		Fiorella Infascelli and Antonio Leotti
2017 (62nd)	Naples '44		Francesco Patierno
2017 (62nd)	Un paese quasi perfetto		Massimo Gaudioso
2017 (62nd)	Pericle	Pericle il nero	Francesca Marciano, Valia Santella and Stefano Mordini
2017 (62nd)	Sweet Dreams	Fai bei sogni	Edoardo Albinati, Marco Bellocchio and Valia Santella
2018 (63rd)	Sicilian Ghost Story		Fabio Grassadonia and Antonio Piazza
2018 (63rd)	La guerra dei cafoni		Barbara Alberti, Davide Barletti, Lorenzo Conte and Carlo D'Amicis
2018 (63rd)	The Place		Paolo Genovese and Isabella Aguilar
2018 (63rd)	Rainbow: A Private Affair	Una questione privata	Paolo and Vittorio Taviani
2018 (63rd)	Tenderness	La tenerezza	Gianni Amelio and Alberto Taraglio
2019 (64th)	Call Me by Your Name	Chiamami col tuo nome	Luca Guadagnino, Walter Fasano and James Ivory
2019 (64th)	I'm Back	Sono tornato	Luca Miniero and Nicola Guaglianone
2019 (64th)	The Invisible Witness	Il testimone invisibile	Stefano Mordini and Massimiliano Catoni
2019 (64th)	The Leisure Seeker		Stephen Amidon, Francesca Archibugi, Paolo Virzì and Francesco Piccolo
2019 (64th)	La profezia dell'armadillo		Zerocalcare, Oscar Glioti, Valerio Mastandrea and Johnny Palomba

=== 2020s ===
Year	English title	Original title	Screenwriter(s)
2020 (65th)	Martin Eden		Maurizio Braucci and Pietro Marcello
2020 (65th)	The Bears' Famous Invasion of Sicily	La famosa invasione degli orsi in Sicilia	Jean-Luc Fromental, Thomas Bidegain and Lorenzo Mattotti
2020 (65th)	The Mayor of Rione Sanità	Il sindaco del rione Sanità	Mario Martone and Ippolita di Majo
2020 (65th)	Pinocchio		Matteo Garrone and Massimo Ceccherini
2020 (65th)	Piranhas	La paranza dei bambini	Claudio Giovannesi, Roberto Saviano and Maurizio Braucci
2021 (66th)	Citizens of the World	Lontano lontano	Marco Pettenello and Gianni Di Gregorio
2021 (66th)	Assandira		Salvatore Mereu
2021 (66th)	The Ties	Lacci	Francesco Piccolo, Domenico Starnone and Daniele Luchetti
2021 (66th)	We Still Talk	Lei mi parla ancora	Pupi Avati and Tommaso Avati
2021 (66th)	You Came Back	Lasciami andare	Francesco Mordini, Francesca Marciano and Luca Infascelli
2022 (67th)	A Girl Returned	L'arminuta	Monica Zapelli and Donatella Di Pietrantonio
2022 (67th)	The Catholic School	La scuola cattolica	Massimo Gaudioso, Luca Infascelli and Stefano Mordini
2022 (67th)	Diabolik		Manetti Bros. and Michelangelo La Neve
2022 (67th)	Una Femmina: The Code of Silence	Una femmina	Lirio Abbate, Serena Brugnolo, Adriano Chiarelli and Francesco Costabile
2022 (67th)	The Land of the Sons	La terra dei figli	Filippo Gravino, Guido Iuculano and Claudio Cupellini
2022 (67th)	Three Floors	Tre piani	Nanni Moretti, Federica Pontremoli and Valia Santella
2023 (68th)	The Eight Mountains	Le otto montagne	Felix Van Groeningen and Charlotte Vandermeersch
2023 (68th)	Bentu		Salvatore Mereu
2023 (68th)	Brado		Massimo Gaudioso and Kim Rossi Stuart
2023 (68th)	The Hummingbird	Il colibrì	Francesca Archibugi, Laura Paolucci and Francesco Piccolo
2023 (68th)	Nostalgia		Mario Martone and Ippolita Di Majo
2024 (69th)	Kidnapped	Rapito	Marco Bellocchio and Susanna Nicchiarelli
2024 (69th)	Lubo		Giorgio Diritti and Fredo Valla
2024 (69th)	Misericordia		Emma Dante, Elena Stancanelli and Giorgio Vasta
2024 (69th)	Mixed by Erry		Sydney Sibilia and Armando Festa
2024 (69th)	Scarlet	Le vele scarlatte	Pietro Marcello, Maurizio Braucci and Maud Ameline
2025 (70th)	The Art of Joy	L'arte della gioia	Valeria Golino, Luca Infascelli, Francesca Marciano, Valia Santella and Stefano Sardo
2025 (70th)	Battlefield	Campo di battaglia	Gianni Amelio and Alberto Taraglio
2025 (70th)	The Boy with Pink Pants	Il ragazzo dai pantaloni rosa	Roberto Proia
2025 (70th)	Familia		Adriano Chiarelli, Francesco Costabile and Vittorio Moroni
2025 (70th)	Naples to New York	Napoli - New York	Gabriele Salvatores

== See also ==
- Academy Award for Best Adapted Screenplay
- BAFTA Award for Best Adapted Screenplay
- César Award for Best Adaptation
- Goya Award for Best Adapted Screenplay
