= 62nd David di Donatello =

2017 Italian film awards

- Date: 27 March 2017
- Site: De Paolis Studios, Rome, Italy
- Hosted by: Alessandro Cattelan

Highlights
- Best Picture: Like Crazy
- Most awards: Like Crazy (5)
- Most nominations: Indivisible and Like Crazy (17)

Television coverage
- Network: Sky Cinema

The 62nd David di Donatello ceremony, presented by the Accademia del Cinema Italiano, was held on 27 March 2017 to honor the best in Italian cinema released from 29 February to 31 December 2016.

The nominations were announced on 21 February 2017. The films that received the most nominations were Indivisible and Like Crazy, with 17 nominations, and Italian Race with 16 nominations.

== Winners and nominees ==
Best Film: Like Crazy – directed by Paolo Virzì‡.; Fiore – directed by Claudio Giovannesi; Indivisible – directed by Edoardo De Angelis; Italian Race – directed by Matteo Rovere; Sweet Dreams – directed by Marco Bellocchio	Best Producer: Indivisible – Attilio De Razza and Pierpaolo Verga‡; Coffee – Cristiano Bortone, Bart Van Langendonck, Peter Bouckaert, Gong Ming Cai, and Natacha Devillers; The Confessions – Andrea Barbagallo; Fiore – Rita Rognoni and IBC Movie; Italian Race – Domenico Procacci; Like Crazy – Marco Belardi
Best Director: Paolo Virzì – Like Crazy‡; Marco Bellocchio – Sweet Dreams; Edoardo De Angelis – Indivisible; Claudio Giovannesi – Fiore; Matteo Rovere – Italian Race	Best New Director: Marco Danieli – Worldly Girl‡; Lorenzo Corvino – WAX: We Are the X; Fabio Guaglione and Fabio Resinaro – Mine; Marco Segato – La pelle dell'orso; Michele Vannucci – The Greatest Dream
Best Actor: Stefano Accorsi – Italian Race as Loris De Martino‡; Valerio Mastandrea – Sweet Dreams as Massimo; Michele Riondino – Worldly Girl as Libero; Sergio Rubini – La stoffa dei sogni as Oreste Campese; Toni Servillo – The Confessions as Roberto Salus	Best Actress: Valeria Bruni Tedeschi – Like Crazy as Beatrice Morandini Valdirana‡; Matilda De Angelis – Italian Race as Giulia De Martino; Angela and Marianna Fontana – Indivisible as Viola and Daisy; Micaela Ramazzotti – Like Crazy as Donatella Morelli; Daphne Scoccia – Fiore as Daphne Bonori
Best Supporting Actor: Valerio Mastandrea – Fiore as Ascanio‡; Roberto De Francesco – Le ultime cose as Sergio; Ennio Fantastichini – La stoffa dei sogni as De Caro; Pierfrancesco Favino – The Confessions as Ministro italiano; Massimiliano Rossi – Indivisible as Peppe	Best Supporting Actress: Antonia Truppo – Indivisible as Titti‡; Valentina Carnelutti – Like Crazy as Fiamma Zappa; Michela Cescon – Piuma as Carla Pardini; Valeria Golino – La vita possibile as Carla; Roberta Mattei – Italian Race as Annarella
Best Original Screenplay: Indivisible – Nicola Guaglianone, Barbara Petronio and Edoardo De Angelis‡; At War with Love – Michele Astori, Pierfrancesco Diliberto and Marco Martani; The Confessions – Roberto Andò and Angelo Pasquini; Fiore – Claudio Giovannesi, Filippo Gravino and Antonella Lattanzi; Italian Race – Filippo Gravino, Francesca Manieri and Matteo Rovere; Like Crazy – Francesca Archibugi and Paolo Virzì	Best Adapted Screenplay: The Stuff of Dreams – Gianfranco Cabiddu, Ugo Chiti and Salvatore De Mola‡; Era d'estate – Fiorella Infascelli and Antonio Leotti; Naples '44 – Francesco Patierno; Un paese quasi perfetto – Massimo Gaudioso; Pericle – Francesca Marciano, Valia Santella and Stefano Mordini; Sweet Dreams – Edoardo Albinati, Marco Bellocchio and Valia Santella
Best Cinematography: Italian Race – Michele D'Attanasio‡; The Confessions – Maurizio Calvesi; Indivisible – Ferran Paredes Rubio; Like Crazy – Vladan Radovic; Sweet Dreams – Daniele Ciprì	Best Production Design: Like Crazy – Tonino Zera‡; At War with Love – Marcello Di Carlo; Indivisible – Carmine Guarino; Sweet Dreams – Marco Dentici; La stoffa dei sogni – Livia Borgognoni
Best Score: Indivisible – Enzo Avitabile‡; Italian Race – Andrea Farri; Like Crazy – Carlo Virzì; La stoffa dei sogni – Franco Piersanti; Sweet Dreams – Carlo Crivelli	Best Original Song: "Abbi pietà di noi" from Indivisible – Music and lyrics by Enzo Avitabile; performed by Enzo Avitabile, Angela Fontana and Marianna Fontana‡; "L'estate addosso" from Summertime – Music by Lorenzo Cherubini, Christian Rigano and Riccardo Onori; lyrics by Lorenzo Cherubini and Vasco Brondi; performed by Jovanotti; "I Can See the Stars" from How to Grow Up Despite Your Parents – Music and lyrics by Fabrizio Campanelli; performed by Leonardo Cecchi, Eleonora Gaggero and Beatrice Vendramin; "Po Popporoppò" from Like Crazy – Music and lyrics by Carlo Virzì; performed by the patients of Villa Biondi; "Seventeen" from Italian Race – Music by Andrea Farri; lyrics by Lara Martelli; performed by Matilda De Angelis
Best Editing: Italian Race – Gianni Vezzosi ‡; 7 Minutes – Consuelo Catucci; Indivisible – Chiara Griziotti; Like Crazy – Cecilia Zanuso; La stoffa dei sogni – Alessio Doglione	Best Sound: Italian Race – Angelo Bonanni, Diego De Santis, Mirko Perri and Michele Mazzucco ‡; Indivisible – Valentino Giannì, Fabio Conca, Omar Abouzaid, Sandro Rossi, Lilio Rosato and Francesco Cucinelli; Like Crazy – Alessandro Bianchi, Luca Novelli, Daniela Bassani, Fabrizio Quadroli and Gianni Pallotto; La stoffa dei sogni – Filippo Porcari, Federica Ripani, Claudio Spinelli, Marco Marinelli and Massimo Marinelli; Sweet Dreams – Gaetano Carito, Pierpaolo Lorenzo, Lilio Rosato, New Digital Sound, Roberto Cappannelli
Best Costumes: Indivisible – Massimo Cantini Parrini‡; At War with Love – Cristiana Ricceri; Italian Race – Cristina La Parola; Like Crazy – Catia Dottori; La stoffa dei sogni – Beatrice Giannini and Elisabetta Antico	Best Digital Effects: Italian Race – Artea Film and Rain Rebel Alliance International Network‡; At War with Love – Chromatica; Indivisible – Makinarium; Mine – Mercurio Domina, Far Forward, Fast Forward; Ustica: The Missing Paper – Canecane, Illusion and Mikros Image
Best Make-up Artist: Italian Race – Luca Mazzoccoli‡; At War with Love – Maurizio Fazzini; Indivisible – Valentina Iannuccilli; Like Crazy – Esmé Sciaroni; La stoffa dei sogni – Silvia Beltrani; Sweet Dreams – Gino Tamagnini	Best Hairstylist: Like Crazy – Daniela Tartari‡; At War with Love – Massimiliano Gelo; Indivisible – Vincenzo Cormaci; Italian Race – Alessio Pompei; Sweet Dreams – Mauro Tamagnini
Best Documentary: Crazy for Football: The Craziest World Cup – directed by Volfango De Biasi‡; 60 - Ieri, oggi, domani – directed by Giorgio Treves; Libera Nos – directed by Federica Di Giacomo; Magic Island – directed by Marco Amenta; Water and Sugar: Carlo Di Palma, the Colours of Life – directed by Fariborz Kamkari	Best Short Film: A casa mia – directed by Volfango De Biasi‡; Ego – directed by Lorenza Indovina; Mostri – directed by Adriano Giotti; Simposio Suino in re minore – directed by Francesco Filippini; Viola, Franca – directed by Marta Savina
Best European Film: I, Daniel Blake (United Kingdom / France / Belgium) – directed by Ken Loach‡; Florence Foster Jenkins (United Kingdom / France) – directed by Stephen Frears; Julieta (Spain) – directed by Pedro Almodóvar; Sing Street (Ireland / United Kingdom / United States) – directed by John Carney; Truman (Spain / Argentina) – directed by Cesc Gay	Best Foreign Film: Nocturnal Animals (United States) – directed by Tom Ford‡; Captain Fantastic (United States) – directed by Matt Ross; Lion (Australia) – directed by Garth Davis; Paterson (United States / Germany / France) – directed by Jim Jarmusch; Sully (United States) – directed by Clint Eastwood
David Youth Award: At War with Love – directed by Pif‡; 7 Minutes – directed by Michele Placido; Like Crazy – directed by Paolo Virzì; Piuma – directed by Roan Johnson; Summertime – directed by Gabriele Muccino	Special David Awards: Roberto Benigni
