= A Girl Returned =

A Girl Returned may refer to:

- A Girl Returned (novel), a 2017 novel by Donatella Di Pietrantonio
- A Girl Returned (film), a 2021 Italian-Swiss drama film, based on the novel
