= Amara Lakhous =

Algerian-born Italian author and anthropologist

Amara Lakhous (born Algiers, 1970) is an Italian author, journalist and anthropologist of Algerian origin. He currently lives in New York City.

== Early life ==
Lakhous was born in 1970 in Algiers, Algeria, in a Berber family with nine siblings. He graduated with a degree in philosophy from the University of Algiers. He also obtained a degree in cultural anthropology from the La Sapienza University in Rome with a thesis on the second generation of Muslim Arab immigrants in Italy.

== Career ==
Lakhous wrote his first book, titled The Bedbugs and the Pirates, in 1993. It was written in the Algerian dialect of Arabic and published in a bilingual Arabic-Italian text in 1999. In 1994, Lakhous began work as a reporter for the Algerian national radio. Shortly thereafter, he left for Italy following death threats from Islamists. From 1995, he worked in Italy as a cultural mediator, interpreter, and translator in the field of immigration. In 2001, he wrote another Arabic-language novel based on his early years in Rome, titled How to be Suckled by the Wolf Without Getting Bit. He then rewrote the novel in Italian, publishing it as Clash of Civilizations Over an Elevator in Piazza Vittorio in 2006, which received critical and popular acclaim. The book has been translated into Dutch, English, and French and was made into a film in 2008.

Between 2003 and 2006, he was a journalist with the Adnkronos International news agency, based in Rome. Lakhous is an editor of a new imprint, Shark/Gharb, that publishes Arabic translations of contemporary European works.

He moved to New York City in 2014 and is currently a visiting professor at New York University.

== Selected works ==
- Le cimici e il pirata. Rome: Arlem. 1999. p. 138. ISBN 978-88-86690-23-2.
- Come farti allattare dalla lupa senza che ti morda. Algiers: Al-ikhtilaf. 2003.
- Scontro di civiltà per un ascensore a Piazza Vittorio. Rome: Edizioni e/o. 2006. p. 189. ISBN 978-88-7641-716-0. (Clash of Civilizations Over an Elevator in Piazza Vittorio, translated by Ann Goldstein, Europa Editions, 2008, ISBN 978-1933372617)
- Divorzio all'islamica a viale Marconi. Rome: Edizioni e/o. 2010. p. 192. ISBN 978-88-7641-929-4. (Divorce Islamic Style, translated by Ann Goldstein, Europa Editions, 2012, ISBN 978-1609450663)
  - Alessandra Stanley described the book as "a whimsical and at times heartbreaking look at the Muslim immigrants" living in Italy.
- Un pirata piccolo piccolo. Rome: Edizioni e/o. 2011. p. 176. ISBN 978-88-6632-012-8.
- Contesa per un maialino italianissimo a San Salvario. Rome: Edizioni e/o. 2013. p. 160. ISBN 978-88-6632-338-9. (Dispute Over a Very Italian Piglet, translated by Ann Goldstein, Europa Editions, 2014, ISBN 978-1609451882)
  - Carmela Ciuraru of The New York Times described it as "very funny".
- La zingarata della verginella di Via Ormea. Rome: Edizioni e/o. 2014. p. 160. ISBN 978-88-6632-521-5. (The Prank of the Good Little Virgin of Via Ormea, translated by Antony Shugaar, 2016, Europa Editions, ISBN 978-1609453091)
- On the quest to write in a third language. Amara Lakhous dreams of green cheese and being reborn into New York City. May 4, 2016. "Literary Hub".
- The Night Bird. Manshurat al-Hibr. 2019. "Arabic Fiction."

== Honours ==
In 2006, Lakhous won the Flaiano prize as well as the Racalmere-Leonardo Sciascia prize for Clash of Civilizations Over an Elevator in Piazza Vittorio. He obtained the Prix des Libraires Algériens in 2008. His 2019 novel The Night Bird was longlisted for the International Prize for Arabic Fiction in 2021.
