= Elisa (2025 film) =

2025 film by Leonardo Di Costanzo

- Italian theatrical release poster
- Directed by: Leonardo Di Costanzo
- Written by: Leonardo Di Costanzo; Bruno Olivero; Valia Santella
- Based on: Io volevo ucciderla by Adolfo Ceretti and Lorenzo Natali
- Produced by: Carlo Cresto-Dina; Manuela Melissano
- Starring: Barbara Ronchi; Roschdy Zem; Diego Ribon; Valeria Golino
- Cinematography: Luca Bigazzi
- Edited by: Carlotta Cristiani
- Music by: Giorgio "Aki" Matteo Oliviero
- Production companies: Tempesta; Rai Cinema; Amka Films Productions; RSI Radiotelevisione Svizzera
- Distributed by: 01 Distribution (Italy)
- Release dates: 4 September 2025 (Venice); 5 September 2025 (Italy)
- Running time: 105 minutes
- Countries: Italy; Switzerland
- Languages: Italian; French

Elisa (Italian: Elisa — Io la volevo uccidere) is a 2025 drama film directed by Leonardo Di Costanzo, co-written with Bruno Olivero and Valia Santella. Barbara Ronchi stars as a convicted murderer who, while in prison, decides to participate in a criminologist's research into family crimes. The film is a co-production between Italy and Switzerland.

The film had its world premiere in the main competition of the 82nd Venice International Film Festival on 4 September 2025, where it was nominated for Golden Lion. It was released in Italy by 01 Distribution on 5 September.

== Plot ==
Elisa Zanetti was raised in an ordinary, middle-class family. Now 35 years old, she has been in prison for ten years for killing her older sister. She burned and hid her sister's body. A motive for the crime could not be determined at the time. Elisa claims she has almost no memory of the crime. After the crime, she remained silent and never revealed what had really occurred. She is serving her sentence in the Moncaldo prison, a model prison with its own teaching center. There, Elisa receives regular visits from her father, the only member of her family who remained close to her.

One day, Elisa decides to participate in the research of the famed criminologist Alaoui. He is invited to Moncaldo as a guest lecturer and specializes in family crimes. In difficult and painful conversations, Elisa begins to open up to him and recall the events of that time. Alaoui investigates the circumstances that led to the murder. Elisa becomes fully conscious of her own guilt for the first time and breaks down.

== Cast ==
- Barbara Ronchi as Elisa Zanetti
- Roschdy Zem as Professor Alaoui
- Diego Ribon as Elisa's father
- Valeria Golino as Laura
- Giorgio Montanini
- Hippolyte Girardot
- Monica Codena
- Roberta Da Soller
- Marco Brinzi

== Production ==
Elisa is the fourth feature film by Italian director Leonardo Di Costanzo, who began his career in the early 1990s with documentary filmmaking. He was inspired to create the project upon reflection of his previous film, The Inner Cage (2021), a drama which told the story of a group of prisoners and guards in a remote prison awaiting transfer. With Elisa, Di Costanzo says his work continued in "a more intimate and disturbing direction". He was less interested in "the crime itself" than in "the inner journey of the perpetrator."

"In Elisa, I tried to convey the complexity of a figure capable of pain, coldness, manipulation, and ultimately a very human desire to be heard. I hope the film raises questions rather than offers answers, and that it can inspire in the audience the same ethical and emotional disorientation that guided my gaze while writing and directing." —Leonardo Di Costanzo

Di Costanzo wrote the film's screenplay with Bruno Olivero and Valia Santella. It was inspired by studies and conversations between criminologists Adolfo Ceretti and Lorenzo Natali which appear in their book Io volevo ucciderla.

== Release ==
Elisa was selected to compete for the Golden Lion at the 82nd Venice International Film Festival, where it had its world premiere on 4 September 2025.

The film was theatrically released in Italy on 5 September 2025, by 01 Distribution. Rai Cinema International Distribution is handling worldwide distribution rights.

== Accolades ==
Award	Date of ceremony	Category	Recipient(s)	Result	Ref.
Venice Film Festival	6 September 2025	Golden Lion	Leonardo Di Costanzo	Nominated	
