= Eduardo Scarpetta (actor, born 1993) =

Italian actor (born 1993)

- Born: 14 April 1993 (age 33); Naples, Italy
- Education: Centro Sperimentale di Cinematografia
- Occupation: Actor
- Years active: 2002–present
- Relatives: Eduardo Scarpetta (great-great-grandfather); Vincenzo Scarpetta (great-grandfather)

Eduardo Scarpetta (Italian pronunciation: [eduˈardo skarˈpetta]; born 14 April 1993) is an Italian actor.

== Early life ==
Scarpetta was born into the famous Scarpetta-De Filippo family, where he grew up around actors, playwrights, and theater directors. His parents, Mario Scarpetta and Maria Basile, were actors who met in the theater; his father ran a theater company before his death at the age of 50, when Scarpetta was 11 years old. His great-great-grandfather is the Italian actor and playwright Eduardo Scarpetta.

He was born and raised in Naples, where attended a liceo classico. He later studied acting at the Centro Sperimentale di Cinematografia in Rome.

== Career ==
In 2002, Scarpetta made his theatrical debut at the age of nine in the play Felicello and Felicella. In 2022, he won the David di Donatello for Best Supporting Actor for his portrayal of his great-grandfather, Vincenzo Scarpetta, in The King of Laughter.

== Acting credits ==
=== Film ===
Year	Title	Role	Ref.
2016	Pericle	Ciro	
2018	Capri-Revolution	Vincenzo	
2021	She's the One	Giulio	
2021	The King of Laughter	Vincenzo Scarpetta	
2023	Mafia Mamma	Fabrizio	
2025	Gioco pericoloso	Peter Drago	

=== Television ===
Year	Title	Role	Notes	Ref.
2018–2024	My Brilliant Friend	Pasquale Peluso	15 episodes	
2021	Carosello Carosone	Renato Carosone	Television film	
2022	The Ignorant Angels	Michele	8 episodes	
2023–2024	The Law According to Lidia Poët	Jacopo Barberis	12 episodes	
2023	The Lions of Sicily	Ignazio Florio	2 episodes	
2025	My Family	Fausto	6 episodes	

=== Theater ===
Year	Title	Role	Venue	Ref.
2002	Feliciello e Feliciella	Little boy	Teatro Stabile	
2008	Proprio come se nulla fosse avvenuto	Various	Teatro Stabile	
2009	Vespertelli	Various	Teatro Stabile	
2011	Progetto Arrevuoto	Various	Teatro Stabile	
2016	In memoria di una signora amica	Alfredo	Teatro del Fondo	
2016	In memoria di una signora amica	Alfredo	Teatro Franco Parenti	
2016–2017	Filumena Marturano	Son #2	Italian tour	
2018	Pochi Poveri	Various	Teatro TAN	
2019	Il paese di cuccagna	Antonio Amati	Teatro San Ferdinando	
2019–2020	After the End	Mark	Teatro Sannazaro	
2019–2020	Pochos	Footballer	Teatro Sannazaro	

== Awards and nominations ==
Award	Year	Category	Nominated work	Result	Ref.
David di Donatello	2022	Best Supporting Actor	The King of Laughter	Won	
Giffoni Film Festival	2022	Giffoni Award		Won	
Nastri d'Argento	2021	Best Actor in a Comedy Film	Carosello Carosone	Nominated	
Nastri d'Argento Grandi Serie	2022	Best Supporting Actor	My Brilliant Friend	Won	
Venice Film Festival	2019	Kineo Award for Best Actor in a TV Series	The Ignorant Angels	Won	
