= I fratelli De Filippo =

2021 Italian comedy-drama film

- Directed by: Sergio Rubini
- Screenplay by: Sergio Rubini; Carla Cavalluzzi; Angelo Pasquini
- Starring: Mario Autore; Domenico Pinelli; Anna Ferraioli Ravel; Giancarlo Giannini
- Cinematography: Fabio Cianchetti
- Edited by: Giogiò Franchini
- Music by: Nicola Piovani
- Distributed by: 01 Distribution
- Release date: 2021
- Language: Italian

I fratelli De Filippo (transl. "The De Filippo Siblings") is a 2021 Italian biographical drama film co-written and directed by Sergio Rubini. The film tells the story of actors Eduardo, Peppino and Titina De Filippo, and their complex relationship with their father, the playwright and stage actor Eduardo Scarpetta.

== Cast ==
- Mario Autore as Eduardo De Filippo
- Domenico Pinelli as Peppino De Filippo
- Anna Ferraioli Ravel as Titina De Filippo
- Giancarlo Giannini as Eduardo Scarpetta
- Susy Del Giudice as Luisa De Filippo
- Biagio Izzo as Vincenzo Scarpetta
- Marisa Laurito as Rosa De Filippo
- Marianna Fontana as Adele Carloni-De Filippo
- Maurizio Casagrande as Giacomo Cinque
- Giovanni Esposito as Capece
- Nicola Di Pinto as Carluccio
- Augusto Zucchi as Impresario from Milan
- Lucianna De Falco as Moneylender
- Jennifer Bianchi as Dorothy Pennington
- Francesco Maccarinelli as Pietro Carloni
- Antonio Milo as Aulicino
- Maurizio Micheli as Nicola Urcioli
- Lucienne Perreca as Maria Scarpetta
- Tiziana Tirrito as Tina Pica
- Vincenzo Salemme as Riccardo Ruggiti

== Release ==
The film premiered at the Rome Film Festival, and was released in Italian cinemas on 13 December 2021.

== Reception ==
The film was nominated for six David di Donatello Awards, winning the award for best score. The score by Nicola Piovani also won the Nastro d'Argento in the same category. The film also received the 2022 Ciak d'oro for best film of the year and for best actress (Susy Del Giudice).
