= The King of Laughter =

2021 Italian-Spanish biographical drama

- Theatrical release poster
- Italian: Qui rido io
- Directed by: Mario Martone
- Screenplay by: Mario Martone; Ippolita Di Majo
- Story by: Mario Martone; Ippolita Di Majo
- Produced by: Nicola Giuliano; Francesca Cima; Carlotta Calori
- Starring: Toni Servillo; Maria Nazionale; Cristiana Dell'Anna; Antonia Truppo; Eduardo Scarpetta; Roberto De Francesco; Lino Musella; Marzia Onorato; Paolo Pierobon; Gianfelice Imparato; Iaia Forte
- Cinematography: Renato Berta
- Edited by: Jacopo Quadri
- Production companies: Indigo Film; Rai Cinema; Tornasol
- Distributed by: 01 Distribution
- Release dates: 7 September 2021 (Venice); 9 September 2021 (Italy)
- Running time: 133 minutes
- Countries: Italy; Spain
- Languages: Italian, Neapolitan

The King of Laughter (Italian: Qui rido io, lit. 'Here I laugh') is a 2021 Italian-Spanish biographical drama film directed by Mario Martone about actor and playwright Eduardo Scarpetta's legal battle against Gabriele D'Annunzio over his parody of the latter's The Daughter of Iorio (1904). Toni Servillo stars as Scarpetta.

The film was selected to compete for the Golden Lion at the 78th Venice International Film Festival.

== Cast ==
- Toni Servillo as Eduardo Scarpetta
- Maria Nazionale as Rosa De Filippo–Scarpetta
- Cristiana Dell'Anna as Luisa De Filippo
- Antonia Truppo as Adelina De Renzis
- Eduardo Scarpetta as Vincenzo Scarpetta
- Roberto De Francesco as Salvatore Di Giacomo
- Lino Musella as Benedetto Croce
- Paolo Pierobon as Gabriele D'Annunzio
- Giovanni Mauriello as Mirone
- Chiara Baffi as 'Nennella' De Filippo
- Roberto Caccioppoli as 'Mimì' Scarpetta
- Lucrezia Guidone as Irma Gramatica
- Elena Ghiaurov as Lyda Borelli
- Gigio Morra as president of the court
- Gianfelice Imparato as Gennaro Pantalena
- Iaia Forte as Rosa Gagliardi
- Greta Esposito as Maria Scarpetta
- Alessandro Manna as Eduardo De Filippo
- Marzia Onorato as Titina De Filippo
- Salvatore Battista as Peppino De Filippo
- Aldo Minei as Eduardello De Filippo
- Tommaso Bianco as Uncle Pasqualino
- Benedetto Casillo as Luca
- Francesco Di Leva as photographer
- Giovanni Ludeno as Ferdinando Russo
- Nello Mascia as examining magistrate

== Reception ==
The King of Laughter has an approval rating of 75% on review aggregator website Rotten Tomatoes, based on 8 reviews, and an average rating of 6.3/10.

Reviewing the film for Variety at the Venice Film Festival, Guy Lodge wrote, "Martone’s film certainly appears to channel the spirit of Scarpetta, though its 18-course tribute banquet doesn’t leave you particularly hungry to investigate further."
