= Ann Goldstein (translator) =

American editor and translator

- Born: 1949 (age 76–77)
- Education: Bennington College; University College, London
- Occupations: Editor and translator
- Known for: Translations of Elena Ferrante's Neapolitan Quartet
- Awards: PEN Renato Poggioli prize

Ann Goldstein (born June 1949) is an American editor and translator from the Italian language. She is best known for her translations of Elena Ferrante's Neapolitan Quartet. She was the panel chair for translated fiction at the US National Book Award in 2022. She was awarded the PEN Renato Poggioli prize in 1994 and was a Guggenheim Fellow in 2008.

== Early life ==
Ann Goldstein grew up in Maplewood, New Jersey, United States. She attended Bennington College, in Vermont, where she read Ancient Greek. She then studied comparative philology at University College, London.

== Career ==
After her graduation, in 1973, Goldstein began work at Esquire magazine as a proof-reader. In 1974, she joined the staff of The New Yorker, working in the copy department and becoming its head in the late 1980s. She retired from The New Yorker in 2017.

From 1987, Goldstein edited John Updike's literary reviews contributed to The New Yorker.

During her time at The New Yorker, Goldstein, along with some colleagues, began taking Italian lessons. Over a period of three years, from 1987, they studied the language and read all of Dante's works. In 1992, Goldstein received Chekhov in Sondrio, a book by Aldo Buzzi, an Italian writer, and she attempted to translate an essay from it. This became Goldstein's first translation publication, coming out in the Sept. 14, 1992, edition of The New Yorker.

In 2004, Goldstein was asked by Europa Editions, a new imprint, to submit a translation of passages from Elena Ferrante's The Days of Abandonment. Her sample was judged the best among the submissions, and she was offered the contract to translate the book.

In 2015, a three-volume publication of the complete works of Primo Levi came out, edited by Goldstein. The effort of obtaining translation rights took six years, while its compilation and translation took seventeen years, and it was acclaimed by critics. Goldstein oversaw the team of nine translators and translated three of Levi's books.

== Accolades ==
Jennifer Maloney in The Wall Street Journal wrote in 2016:

"Translators rarely achieve celebrity status. But as Ms. Ferrante’s star has risen, so too has Ms. Goldstein’s. Her English translations of the four books in Ms. Ferrante’s Neapolitan series have sold more than a million copies in North America, the U.K., Australia and New Zealand. Ms. Goldstein ... is now one of the most sought-after translators of Italian literature."

Robert Weil, editor-in-chief and publishing director of Liveright, has said of Goldstein, “Her name on a book now is gold."

== Selected works ==
=== Translated ===
Fiction

- de Céspedes, Alba (2025). There's No Turning Back: A Novel. Washington Square Press. ISBN 978-1-6680-8363-5.
- de Céspedes, Alba (2023). Forbidden Notebook. Astra House. ISBN 978-1-66260-139-2.
- Di Pietrantonio, Donatella (2022). A Sister's Story. Europa. ISBN 978-1609457471.
- Di Pietrantonio, Donatella (2019). A Girl Returned. Europa. ISBN 978-1609455286.
- Jarre, Marina (2021). Distant Fathers. New Vessel Press. ISBN 978-1939931948.
- Morante, Elsa (2019). Arturo's Island. Liveright. ISBN 978-1631493294.
- Baricco, Alessandro. Silk: A Story of War. Canongate. ISBN 978-8129118189.
- Charbonnier, Rita (2007). Mozart's Sister. Crown. ISBN 978-0307346780.
- De Cataldo, Giancarlo (2009). The Father and the Foreigner. Europa. ISBN 978-1933372723.
- Ferrante, Elena (2012). My Brilliant Friend. Europa. ISBN 978-1609450786.
- Ferrante, Elena (2013). The Story of a New Name. Europa. ISBN 978-1609451349.
- Ferrante, Elena (2014). Those Who Leave and Those Who Stay. Europa. ISBN 978-1609452339.
- Ferrante, Elena (2015). The Story of the Lost Child. Europa. ISBN 978-1609452865.
- Ferrante, Elena (2005). Troubling Love. Europa. ISBN 978-1933372167.
- Ferrante, Elena (2005). The Days of Abandonment. Europa. ISBN 978-1933372006.
- Janeczek, Helena (2019). The Girl with the Leica. Europa. ISBN 978-1-60945-547-7.
- Lakhous, Amara (2016). The Hoax of the Little Virgin in Via Ormea. Europa. ISBN 978-1609453091.
- Lakhous, Amara (2008). Clash of Civilizations Over an Elevator in Piazza Vittorio. Europa. ISBN 978-1-933372-61-7.
- Leopardi, Giacomo (2013). Zibaldone. Penguin. ISBN 978-0141194400.
- Levi, Primo (October 27, 2015). The Truce. Liveright. ISBN 978-0871404565.
- Pasolini, Pier Paolo (2016). The Street Kids. Europa. ISBN 978-1609453084.
- Pera, Pia (1999). Lo's Diary. Fox Rock. ISBN 978-0964374010.
- Vitale, Serena (2000). Pushkin's Button. Fourth Estate. ISBN 978-1857029376.

Non-fiction

- Lahiri, Jhumpa (2016). In Other Words. Knopf. ISBN 978-1101875551.
- Marazzi, Martino (October 2011). Voices of Italian America: A History of Early Italian American Literature with a Critical Anthology. Fordham University. ISBN 978-0823239733.
- Monda, Antonio (2007). Do You Believe? Conversations on God and Religion. Vintage. ISBN 978-0307280589.
- Sonnino, Piera (March 31, 2009). This Has Happened: An Italian Family in Auschwitz. Palgrave Macmillan. ISBN 978-0230613997.

=== Edited ===
- Levi, Primo (October 27, 2015). The Complete Works of Primo Levi. Liveright. ISBN 978-0871404565.

== Honours ==
- 1993, 2002 – Fellowship of the American Academy in Rome
- 2008 – Guggenheim Fellowship
- PEN Renato Poggioli Translation Award
