= Christelle Dabos =

French fantasy writer

- Born: 1980 (age 45–46); Cannes, Côte d'Azur, France
- Occupation: Writer
- Writing career
- Years active: 2013–present
- Genre: Fantasy
- Notable work: The Mirror Visitor series
- Notable awards: Gallimard-RTL-Télérama First Novel (2013); Grand Prix de l'Imaginaire - Francophone Youth Novel (2016)
- Website: christelledabos.com/international/

Christelle Dabos (born 1980) is a French author best known for The Mirror Visitor quadrilogy, a fantasy series that has sold over a million copies at Gallimard Jeunesse and has been translated into twenty different languages. Dabos achieved success when her debut novel, A Winter's Promise, was awarded first place at the 2013 Gallimard-RTL-Télérama First Novel competition.

== Life and career ==
Christelle Dabos was born in 1980 in Cannes on the Côte d'Azur and grew up in a family of musicians. She moved to a village near La Louvière in Wallonia, Belgium, in 2005 and unsuccessfully sought work as a librarian.

Dabos began writing The Mirror Visitor series in 2007, but shortly after she was diagnosed with jaw cancer and had to undergo surgery and jaw reconstruction. In her convalescence, she turned to the website Plume d'argent, a repository for fanfiction and original fiction where writers could exchange feedback. After becoming an administrator on the platform, Dabos was encouraged by her fellow writers to submit her first novel, the first volume of The Mirror Visitor series entitled A Winter's Promise, to the Gallimard-RTL-Télérama First Novel competition, which she subsequently won in 2013. The novel was also named a best book of the year by critics and publications in the United States, including Entertainment Weekly, Bustle, Publishers Weekly, and Chicago Review of Books. The Mirror Visitor series follows the adventures of Ophelia, a girl with the power to read the past of objects as well as the ability to pass through mirrors. The fantastical world in which the story is set includes 21 major arks, the remains of Earth after a cataclysmic event shattered it. Each ark is presided over by an ancestral family spirit and inhabited by people with unique abilities. The story begins when Ophelia is promised in marriage to Thorn, a taciturn man from a far-away ark called the Pole. The title of the series (La Passe-miroir in French) is inspired by Le Passe-muraille, a literary work by the French writer Marcel Aymé.

In 2015, Dabos published with Gallimard Jeunesse the second novel in the series, The Missing of Clairdelune, which along with A Winter's Promise was awarded the Grand prix de l'Imaginaire in the category Francophone Youth Novel in 2016. The third and fourth instalments of the series were released in 2017 and 2019, respectively. The series was compared by the national press to Harry Potter by J. K. Rowling and His Dark Materials by Philip Pullman. The novels were subsequently released in English translated by Hildegarde Serle at Europa Editions in 2018, 2019, 2020, and 2022. The series has sold over a million copies and has been translated in twenty languages. The book cover illustrations are by Laurent Gapaillard.

In 2022, Dabos published Et L'imagination prend feu as part of the Secrets d'écriture collection published by Le Robert. In 2023, Dabos published Here, and Only Here at Gallimard Jeunesse in French and at Europa Editions in English, translated by Hildegard Serle. Writing Here, and Only Here, Dabos was "strongly influenced by magic realism", especially South American authors like Gabriel García Márquez, Isabel Allende and José Donoso.

Here, and Only Here takes us deep inside a school considered to be THE school – a microcosm with its own rules and taboos, rights and wrongs, those at the top and the bottom of the social hierarchy, and everything is constantly changing. It’s a place where anything is possible: there is a student who can walk on the ceiling, a mysterious liquid driving people insane, and toilets that open into Hell…

— Dabos in an interview with Fantasy Hive in 2023

== Publications ==
=== The Mirror Visitor quartet ===
1. A Winter's Promise, translated by Hildegarde Serle, Europa Editions, 2018 (ISBN 9781609454838)
  - Les fiancés de l'hiver, Gallimard Jeunesse, Collection Hors Série, 2013 (ISBN 9782070653768)
2. The Missing of Clairdelune, translated by Hildegarde Serle, Europa Editions, 2019 (ISBN 9781609455071)
  - Les disparus du Clairdelune, Gallimard Jeunesse, Collection Romans Ado, 2015 (ISBN 9782070661985)
3. The Memory of Babel, translated by Hildegarde Serle, Europa Editions, 2020 (ISBN 9781609456139)
  - La mémoire de Babel, Gallimard Jeunesse, Collection Hors Série, 2017 (ISBN 9782075081894)
4. The Storm of Echoes, translated by Hildegarde Serle, Europa Editions, 2021
  - La Tempête des échos, Gallimard Jeunesse, Collection Romans Ado, 2019 (ISBN 9782075093866)

=== Standalone novels ===
- Et L'imagination prend feu, Le Robert, 2022 (ISBN 978-2321017325)
- Here, and Only Here, translated by Hildegarde Serle, Europa Editions, 2023 (ISBN 9781609459574)
  - Ici et seulement ici, Gallimard Jeunesse, Collection Romans Ado, 2023 (ISBN 9782075187893)
- We, translated by Hildegarde Serle, Europa Editions, 2026 (ISBN 979-8-88966-204-4)
  - Nous, Gallimard Jeunesse, Collection Romans Ado, 2024 (ISBN 978-2-07-521180-2)
