= Romulus (TV series) =

2020 Italian TV series

- Genre: Historical drama; Adventure
- Created by: Matteo Rovere
- Inspired by: Founding of Rome
- Written by: Filippo Gravino; Guido Iuculano; Flaminia Gressi; Federico Gnesini
- Directed by: Matteo Rovere; Michele Alhaique; Enrico Maria Artale; Francesca Mazzoleni
- Starring: Andrea Arcangeli; Francesco Di Napoli; Marianna Fontana; Sergio Romano; Ivana Lotito; Vanessa Scalera; Valentina Bellè; Emanuele Di Stefano; Max Malatesta; Massimo Foschi
- Composers: Mokadelic; Andrea Farri
- Country of origin: Italy
- Original language: Old Latin
- No. of seasons: 2
- No. of episodes: 18

Production
- Producers: Giovanni Stabilini; Marco Chimenz; Francesca Longardi; Riccardo Tozzi; Matteo Rovere
- Cinematography: Vladan Radovic; Giuseppe Maio; Francesco Scazzosi
- Editors: Valeria Sapienza; Marcello Saurino; Gianni Vezzosi; Francesco Loffredo
- Running time: 44–63 minutes
- Production companies: Cattleya; Groenlandia; Sky Studios; ITV Studios

Original release
- Network: Sky Atlantic
- Release: November 6, 2020 – November 11, 2022

Romulus, graphically rendered as ROMVLVS, is an Italian historical drama television series created by Matteo Rovere about the founding of Rome. The series is notable for using archaic Latin instead of Italian.

Produced by Sky Italia, Cattleya, and Groenlandia, two episodes of the series premiered at the 2020 Rome Film Festival. The series was first broadcast in Italy on Sky Atlantic on 6 November 2020. In April 2021 it was renewed for a second season. The series was sold in over 40 countries.

== Cast ==
=== Main ===
- Andrea Arcangeli as Yemos, the prince of Alba Longa and Enitos' twin brother
- Francesco Di Napoli as Wiros, a slave from Velia participating to the Lupercalia.
- Marianna Fontana as Ilia, Amulius' daughter and Vestal priestess.
- Sergio Romano as Amulius / Servios, King Numitor's younger brother, later known as Servios.
- Ivana Lotito as Gala (season 1), Amulius' wife and Ilia's mother.
- Vanessa Scalera as Silvia, King Numitor's daughter and Yemos and Enitos' mother.
- Valentina Bellè as Hersilia (season 2), the leader of the Sabine priestesses.
- Emanuele Di Stefano as Titus Tatius (season 2), Sancus' son and King of the Sabines.
- Max Malatesta as Sabos (season 2), Titus' advisor and commander of his army.
- Massimo Foschi as Aranth (season 2), an old Etruscan in the Land of Tuscia who heals Yemos.

=== Recurring ===
- Giovanni Buselli as Enitos (season 1), Silvia's son and Yemos' twin brother.
- Massimiliano Rossi as Spurius (season 1), the king of Velia and Amulius' ally.
- Corrado Invernizzi as Eulinos (season 1), a Greek merchant who hosts Numitor and Silvia.
- Yorgo Voyagis as Numitor, the king of Alba Longa, Silvia's father, and Yemos and Enitos' grandfather.
- Gabriel Montesi as Cnaeus (season 1), a slave from Velia and the king of the Luperci.
- Emilio De Marchi as Ertas (season 1), the king of Gabii and Lausus' father.
- Marlon Joubert as Lausus, Ertas' son.
- Silvia Calderoni as the She-Wolf, the Leader of the Ruminales.
- Demetra Avincola as Deftri, a young warrior of the Ruminales, attracted to Wiros.
- Francesco Santagada as Maccus, one of the last surviving of the Luperci alongside Yemos and Wiros, later advisor and lieutenant of the kings together with Herenneis.
- Piergiuseppe di Tanno as Herenneis, a warrior of the Ruminales, later advisor, and lieutenant of the kings together with Maccus.
- Anna Chiara Colombo as Tarinkri, a warrior of the Ruminales.
- Valerio Malorni as Adieis, a warrior and healer of the Ruminales.
- Pietro Micci as Attus, a priest of Mars and warrior who trains Ilia to fight.
- Ludovica Nasti as Vibia (season 2), the youngest among the Sabine priestesses.
- Giancarlo Commare as Atys (season 2) the king of Satricum.

== Production ==
The first season of the series was greenlighted in 2019 and it was shot in 28 weeks in Rome. It was originally shot in Old Latin.

== Reception ==
The series won the 2021 Nastro d'Argento for best Italian TV series.

== Other media ==
Starting from October 29, 2020, a trilogy of novels that expands the narrative universe, an unpublished cross-media project for Italy, has been published by HarperCollins. Written by Luca Azzolini, the volumes are titled Romulus: Book I – The Blood of the Wolf (29 October 2020), Romulus: Book II – The Queen of Battles (November 2020) and Romulus: Book III – The City of Wolves (January 2021).

== See also ==
- The First King: Birth of an Empire, Rovere's 2019 film about the story of Romulus and Remus spoken in Old Latin.
