= Reveries of a Solitary Walker (film) =

- Italian theatrical release poster
- Directed by: Paolo Gaudio
- Screenplay by: Paolo Gaudio
- Produced by: Angelo Poggi
- Starring: Luca Lionello; Lorenzo Monaco; Nicoletta Cefaly; Domiziano Cristopharo; Fabiano Lioi; Angelique Cavallari; Fabrizio Ferracane; Selene Rosiello
- Cinematography: Sandro Magliano
- Music by: Sandro Di Stefano
- Production companies: Smart Brands; Leonardo Cruciano Workshop
- Distributed by: Mediaplex Italia
- Release dates: 1 November 2014 (Samain du Cinéma Fantastique); 26 November 2015 (Italy)
- Running time: 87 minutes
- Country: Italy
- Language: Italian

Reveries of a Solitary Walker (Italian: Fantasticherie di un passeggiatore solitario), also known as Reveries of a Lonely Walker and Reveries of a Solitary Stroller, is a 2014 Italian live-action/claymation fantasy film directed by Paolo Gaudio, inspired by Reveries of a Solitary Walker by Jean-Jacques Rousseau. It was screened at the Sci-Fi-London festival, and later released in the United States by Uncork’d Entertainment. It is also available on Prime Video.

== Plot ==
1876. Jean-Jacques Renou is a penniless old writer who writes the novel Reveries of a Lonely Walker, centered on the fantastic story of a child lost in the woods. Nowadays, the philosophy student Theo discovers Renou's novel, which has remained unfinished, and is so obsessed with it that he tries to bring it to fruition.

== Awards ==
- 2014
  - La Samain du Cinéma Fantastique: Grand Prix du Festival
- 2015:
  - Fantafestival: Mario Bava award
  - Boston Science Fiction Film Festival: Best World Film
  - Fantastic Cinema, Little Rock: Audience Award
  - TOHorror Film Fest, Turin: Best Film and Antonio Margheriti Prize for Creativity
  - FKM – Festival de cinema fantástico da Coruña: Best Visual Effects and Best Soundtrack by Sandro Di Stefano
  - Premio Cinearti La chioma di Berenice: Best Soundtrack
- 2017
  - MedFF Mediterranean Film Festival: Best Animation

== See also ==
- List of animated feature films of 2014
