= I Can See It in Your Eyes =

2010 Italian crime-comedy film

- Directed by: Valia Santella
- Screenplay by: Valia Santella; Heidrun Schleef
- Produced by: Nanni Moretti; Angelo Barbagallo
- Starring: Stefania Sandrelli; Teresa Saponangelo; Luigi Maria Burruano
- Cinematography: Tommaso Borgstrom
- Edited by: Clelio Benevento
- Music by: Paolo Fresu
- Release date: 2004
- Language: Italian

I Can See It in Your Eyes (Italian: Te lo leggo negli occhi) is a 2004 Italian drama film co-written and directed by Valia Santella, in her directorial debut. It premiered at the 61st edition of the Venice Film Festival, in the Orizzonti sidebar. For her performance Teresa Saponangelo was nominated for the Silver Ribbon for best supporting actress.

== Cast ==
- Stefania Sandrelli as Margherita
- Teresa Saponangelo as Chiara
- Luigi Maria Burruano as Carlo
- Camilla Di Nicola as Lucia
- Ernesto Mahieux as Mico
- Mariano Rigillo as Longone
- Walter Di Nicola as Walter
- Catherine Spaak as TV Presenter
- Stefano Abbati as Sandro
- Silvia Cohen as Claudia
- Sergio Albelli as Alberto
- Betty Pedrazzi as Teresa
- Cloris Brosca as Marinella
- Tonino Taiuti as Palumbo
