= Bridges of Sarajevo =

2014 film

- Film poster
- Directed by: Aida Begić; Leonardo Di Costanzo; Jean-Luc Godard; Kamen Kalev; Isild Le Besco; Sergei Loznitsa; Vincenzo Marra; Ursula Meier; Vladimir Perišić; Cristi Puiu; Marc Recha; Angela Schanelec; Teresa Villaverde
- Release date: 22 May 2014 (Cannes)
- Running time: 114 minutes
- Countries: France; Bosnia and Herzegovina; Switzerland; Italy; Portugal; Germany
- Language: French

Bridges of Sarajevo (French: Les Ponts de Sarajevo) is a 2014 anthology film exploring Sarajevo present and past, directed by thirteen different directors. It was shown in the Special Screenings section of the 2014 Cannes Film Festival.

== Creators ==
- Directors:
  - Aida Begić (Bosnia and Herzegovina)
  - Leonardo Di Costanzo (Italy), story based on "La paura" by Federico De Roberto
  - Jean-Luc Godard (Switzerland)
  - Kamen Kalev (Bulgaria)
  - Isild Le Besco (France)
  - Sergei Loznitsa (Ukraine)
  - Vincenzo Marra (Italy)
  - Ursula Meier (Switzerland)
  - Vladimir Perišić (Serbia)
  - Cristi Puiu (Romania)
  - Marc Recha (Spain)
  - Angela Schanelec (Germany)
  - Teresa Villaverde (Portugal)
- Artistic director: Jean-Michel Frodon
- Animation sequences: François Schuiten and Luís da Matta Almeida

== Production ==
- Production: Cinétévé - Obala Art Centar.
- Co-production: Bande à part Films, Mir Cinematografica, Ukbar Filmes, Unafilm (and: France 2 Cinéma, Orange Studio, Rai Cinema, RTS Swiss Radio Television, Centenary's Mission of the First World War).
