= Europa Editions UK =

British publishing house

- Status: Active
- Founded: 2011
- Founder: Sandro Ferri; Sandra Ozzola Ferri
- Country of origin: United Kingdom
- Headquarters location: City of Westminster, London, England
- Distribution: United Kingdom, Republic of Ireland
- Key people: Eva Ferri; Daniela Petracco; Millie Guille
- Publication types: Books
- Fiction genres: Literary fiction, general fiction, non-fiction, crime
- Imprints: Tonga Books, World Noir^{[17]}, Europa Compass
- Official website: europaeditions.co.uk

Europa Editions UK is an independent British publishing house. It was founded in 2011 by Sandro Ferri and Sandra Ozzola Ferri, the owners and publishers of the Italian press company Edizioni E/O. In a 2013 interview, Sandro Ferri said the company was "born with the intention to create bridges between cultures."

Europa is directed by Eva Ferri while the editor is Millie Guille and Daniela Petracco manages publicity, marketing and sales.

== Notable publications ==
Europa published Elena Ferrante's Neapolitan Novels from 2012 to 2015. The series was adapted into a two-part play by April De Angelis at the Rose Theatre, Kingston in March 2017. The first book in the series has also been adapted into an HBO television series entitled My Brilliant Friend. Writers published by Europa include Andrea Camilleri, Négar Djavadi, Deborah Eisenberg, Dario Fo, Saleem Haddad, Jean-Claude Izzo, Amelie Nothomb, Pier Paolo Pasolini, and Eric Emmanuel Schmitt.

Europa entered the YA landscape with the publication of A Winter's Promise by Christelle Dabos, translated from the French by Hildegarde Serle.

== Imprints ==
Tonga books was an editorial enterprise undertaken by Europa Editions in collaboration with American author Alice Sebold, who acquired and edited four works of fiction published by Europa under the series name Tonga Books.

In 2013, Europa launched its series of international crime fiction, Europa World Noir. Publishers Weekly wrote that the series signaled Europa's "reaffirmed enthusiasm for noir."^{[17]} Notable titles in the series include Gene Kerrigan's Gold Dagger Award-winning The Rage, Jean-Claude Izzo’s Total Chaos, which launched the Mediterranean Noir movement, and the reissue of Scottish crime writer William McIlvanney’s Laidlaw books. Karin Brynard's Weeping Waters was published by Europa's imprint World Noir in 2018. It has been shortlisted for 2019 prestigious Crime Writers’ Association (CWA) International Dagger.

Europa launched Europa Compass, a new nonfiction imprint featuring titles on travel, contemporary culture, popular science, history, philosophy, and politics.

== Distribution ==
In 2019 the company moved its sales operation to become part of the Alliance, a global group of 15 publishers and their international partners who share a common vision of editorial excellence and original, diverse publishing alongside innovation in marketing and commercial success. The sales service and administrative backup to the Alliance is provided by Faber & Faber.

Europa UK titles are distributed in the UK and Ireland by Grantham Book Services (GBS).
