= The Interval =

2012 film by Leonardo Di Costanzo

- Directed by: Leonardo Di Costanzo
- Screenplay by: Leonardo Di Costanzo; Mariangela Barbanente; Maurizio Braucci
- Starring: Alessio Gallo
- Cinematography: Luca Bigazzi
- Edited by: Carlotta Cristiani
- Music by: Marco Cappelli
- Release dates: September 4, 2012 (Venice); September 5, 2012 (Italy)
- Running time: 90 minutes
- Language: Italian

The Interval (Italian: L'intervallo) is a 2012 Italian-Swiss crime-drama film co-written and directed by Leonardo Di Costanzo.

== Cast ==
- Alessio Gallo: Salvatore
- Salvatore Ruocco: Mimmo
- Francesca Riso: Veronica
- Carmine Paternoster: Bernardino

== Release and reception ==
The film marked the narrative film debut of Di Costanzo, and premiered in the Horizons section of the 69th Venice International Film Festival, in which it won the Fipresci Prize.

The film was awarded several additional awards, including the David di Donatello for Best New Director, the Nastro d'Argento for best cinematography, the Ciak D'Oro for Best Film and Best First Work and the Foreign Press Grand Prix at the 2013 Globi d'oro.
