= The Intruder (2017 film) =

2017 film

- Film poster
- Italian: L'intrusa
- Directed by: Leonardo Di Costanzo
- Written by: Leonardo Di Costanzo; Maurizio Braucci; Bruno Oliviero
- Produced by: Carlo Cresto-Dina; Thierry Lounas; Tiziana Soudani
- Starring: Marcello Fonte; Raffaella Giordano
- Cinematography: Hélène Louvart
- Edited by: Carlotta Cristiani
- Music by: Marco Cappelli; Adam Rudolph
- Release date: 22 May 2017 (Cannes)
- Country: Italy
- Language: Italian

The Intruder (Italian: L'Intrusa) is a 2017 Italian drama film directed by Leonardo Di Costanzo. It was screened in the Directors' Fortnight section at the 2017 Cannes Film Festival.

== Cast ==
- Marcello Fonte as Gino
- Raffaella Giordano as Giovanna
