= Misericordia (2023 film) =

2023 drama film

- Directed by: Emma Dante
- Screenplay by: Emma Dante; Elena Stancanelli; Giorgio Vasta
- Starring: Simone Zambelli; Simona Malato
- Cinematography: Clarissa Cappellani
- Edited by: Benni Atria
- Music by: Gianluca Porcu
- Release date: 26 October 2023 (RFF)
- Language: Italian

Misericordia (lit. 'Mercy') is a 2023 Italian drama film co-written and directed by Emma Dante. It was awarded the Grand Prix for the Best Film at the 27th Tallinn Black Nights Film Festival.

== Plot ==
In a remote Sicilian village, three women - Betta, Nuccia, and Anna - live together in a decaying house, where daily routines of servitude and silence reinforce their marginalization. Betta makes some money as a prostitute, both a means of subsistence and a symbol of the exploitation imposed by a patriarchal society. Part of this bleak world is Arturo, innocent yet awkward, he is a silent witness to their suffering and resilience. The women endure cycles of humiliation under Polifemo, a domineering figure who embodies oppressive male authority. As tensions rise, their quiet defiance exposes the cruelty of tradition, portraying systemic misogyny, economic desperation, and the yearning for dignity and liberation.

== Cast ==
- Simone Zambelli as Arturo
- Simona Malato as Betta
- Tiziana Cuticchio as Nuccia
- Milena Catalano as Anna
- Fabrizio Ferracane as Polifemo
- Carmine Maringola as Enzo

== Production ==
Like previous Dante's efforts, the film is based on Dante's own play. The film was shot between Palermo and Trapani.

== Release ==
The film premiered out of competition at the 18th Rome Film Festival. It was released in Italian cinemas on 16 November 2023.

== Reception ==
Critical response

Panorama film critic Simona Santoni included the film in the best 10 Italian films of 2023, and described it as "visceral and intense, with varied baroque moments." Wendy Ide from Screen International described it as a " visceral, unsettling" film that "with its hard-edged compassion and affinity with society’s discarded and rejected souls, has a kinship with the work of Pasolini". Cineuropa wrote: "This incredibly dark tale ends up filling our hearts to bursting point".

Awards

Misericordia won the Grand Prix for the Best Film at the 27th Tallinn Black Nights Film Festival. It received a David di Donatello nomination for Best Adapted Screenplay and four Nastro d'Argento noms, for best actress (Simona Malato), best supporting actor (Fabrizio Ferracane), best cinematography and best casting director.
