= A Girl Returned (novel) =

Novel by Donatella Di Pietrantonio

- Author: Donatella Di Pietrantonio
- Original title: L'Arminuta
- Translator: Ann Goldstein
- Publisher: Einaudi, Europa Editions
- Publication date: 2017
- English publication date: 2019
- Media type: Print

A Girl Returned (Italian: L'Arminuta) is a novel by Donatella Di Pietrantonio. It was first published by Einaudi in 2017.

== Plot ==
The narrator, who tellingly is never named, finds out that the people she knew and loved as her parents were only foster parents when they return her to her birth family, abruptly and without explanation. At 14 years old she must find her way through the mess of confusion, abandonment, unwanted siblings, resentment and adolescent angst on her own.

== Reception ==
While not an autobiographical novel, Di Pietrantonio drew inspiration for several parts of it from her personal experiences. The novel, which is set in Abruzzo between the 1960s and the 1970s, achieved large success, selling over 300,000 copies. It was also awarded several prizes, including the Premio Campiello and the Premio Napoli. In 2019, it was translated in English by Ann Goldstein and published by Europa Editions.

In 2021, the book was adapted into a film with the same name directed by Giuseppe Bonito.
