= Fabrizio Ferracane =

Italian actor (born 1975)

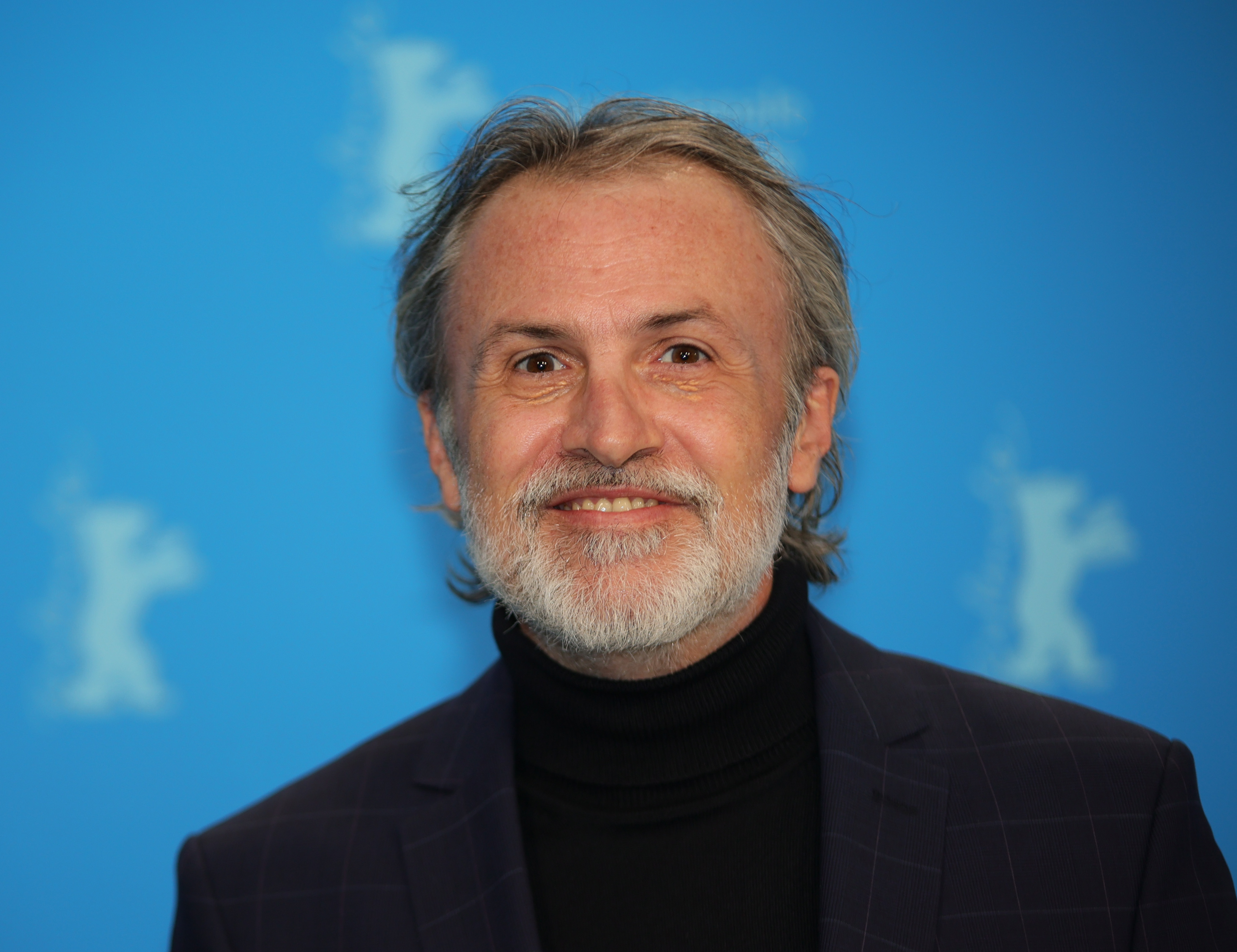
- Ferracane at the 2022 Berlin Film Festival
- Born: 13 July 1975 (age 50); Mazara del Vallo, Italy
- Occupation: Actor

Fabrizio Ferracane (born 13 July 1975) is an Italian film, television, and stage actor.

== Life and career ==
Born in Mazara del Vallo, Ferracane studied at the Teatès Drama School in Palermo, graduating in 1998, and was mainly active on stage, where he also worked as director. He made his film debut in 1999, in Giuseppe Tornatore's Malèna. He got his breakout in 2013, with the role of Luciano in Francesco Munzi's Black Souls, a role which got him nominations for best actor from David di Donatello, Nastro d'Argento and Globo d'oro Awards.

In 2019, Ferracane was awarded a Nastro d'Argento for best supporting actor thanks to his performance as Italian mobster Giuseppe "Pippo" Calò in Marco Bellocchio's The Traitor.

== Filmography ==
=== Film ===
Year	Title	Role(s)	Notes
2000	Malèna	Extra	Uncredited
2003	Andata e ritorno	Appuntato	
2013	L'ultima foglia	Zeno	
2014	Black Souls	Luciano	
2015	Uno per tutti	Gil	
2015	Reveries of a Solitary Walker	Theo's Father	
2016	Ho amici in paradiso	Felice Castriota	
2017	Blue Boy	Guido	Short film
2017	La terra buona	Giuseppe Mastroianni	
2017	After the War	Riccardo	
2017	Ieri e domani	Vito	Short film
2017	Ninna Nanna	Salvo	
2017	L'attrazione gravitazionale del professor D	Professor D	Short film
2017	L'ordine delle cose	Terranova	
2018	Blues	Tommaso	Short film
2019	The Traitor	Giuseppe Calò	
2019	Le mani nelle macerie	Acentino	Short film
2020	The Italian Boys	Capedumazza	
2021	Don't Kill Me	Luca Bertozzi	
2021	La terra dei figli	Aringo	
2021	School of Mafia	Primo Di Maggio	
2021	Il paradiso del pavone	Manfredi	
2021	The Inner Cage	Franco Coletti	
2021	A Girl Returned	The Father	
2022	Una Femmina: The Code of Silence	Salvatore	
2022	Leonora addio	The Agrigento Municipality Delegate	
2022	The Girl from Tomorrow	Pietro Crimi	
2022	La prima regola	Principal	
2023	Doppio passo	Carlo Russo	
2023	The Cage	Father Agostino	
2023	Misericordia	Polifemo	
2023	Castelrotto	Ernesto	
2024	La cosa migliore	Mattia's Father	
2024	Settimo grado	Ettore	
2024	Indelebile	Carlo	
2025	Lo scuru	Nitto	
2025	La guerra di Cesare	Cesare Manca	
2025	The Big Fake	Zù Pippo	

=== Television ===
Year	Title	Role(s)	Notes
2005–2018	Inspector Montalbano	Dr. Mendolia	Episodes: "Il giro di boa", "Par condicio"
2005–2018	Inspector Montalbano	Saverio Moscato	Episode: "Amore"
2007	Il Capo dei Capi	Vito Maranza	3 episodes
2007	Distretto di Polizia	Romeo Callaciani	Episode: "Nella morsa dell'ingranaggio"
2010	Squadra antimafia – Palermo oggi	Totò Platania	Recurring role (season 2)
2011	Il segreto dell'acqua	Luigi Lo Jacona	Main role
2014	Il tredicesimo apostolo	Roberto	Episode: "Finchè morte non vi separi"
2014	Le mani dentro la città	Inspector Giuliani	Episode: "Episode One"
2015	The Ladies' Paradise	Vincenzo Iorio	8 episodes
2016	Tutti insieme all'improvviso	Filippo	Main role
2016	Felicia Impastato	Umberto Santino	Television movie
2016	Lampedusa: Dall'orizzonte in poi	Basile	Two-parts television movie
2018	Liberi sognatori	Paolo Borsellino	Episode: "La scorta di Borsellino – Emanuela Loi"
2018	Prima che la notte	Gaetano Caponnetto	Television movie
2018	Thou Shalt Not Kill	Fabrizio D'Amato	Episode: "Episode 16"
2019	La Compagnia del Cigno	Vincenzo Abbate	Recurring role (season 1)
2019	Giorgio Ambrosoli – Il presso del coraggio	Michele Sindona	Television movie
2020	Gli orologi del diavolo	Mario Graziano	Main role
2022	L'Ora – Inchiostro contro piombo	Michele Navarra	Main role
2022–present	The Bad Guy	Cataldo Palamita	Main role
2024	Il re	Gregorio Verna	Main role (season 2)
2025	Maria Corleone	Matteo Lombardo	Main role (season 2)
2025	Gerri	Alfredo	4 episodes
2026	A testa alta – Il coraggio di una donna	Luigi Bevilacqua	Main role
