= Leonardo Di Costanzo =

Italian director and screenwriter

Leonardo Di Costanzo (born in 1958) is an Italian director and screenwriter.

== Life and career ==
Born in Ischia, after graduating at the University of Naples Federico II Di Costanzo moved to Paris, where he followed Ateliers Varan courses and worked for French television. After directing several documentaries, he made his narrative film debut in 2012 with The Interval, which premiered in the Horizons section of the 69th Venice International Film Festival and earned him the David di Donatello for Best New Director, the Ciak D'Oro for Best Film and Best First Work and the Foreign Press Grand Prix at the 2013 Globi d'oro.

After directing a segment of the anthology film Bridges of Sarajevo, his following film The Intruder was screened in the Directors' Fortnight section at the 2017 Cannes Film Festival. His 2021 film The Inner Cage was screened out of competition at the 70th Venice International Film Festival and Di Costanzo's screenplay was awarded as Best Original Screenplay at the 2022 67th David di Donatello Awards. In 2025, his film Elisa was entered into the competition at the 82nd Venice International Film Festival.

== Selected filmography ==
- The Interval (2012)
- Bridges of Sarajevo (2014)
- The Intruder (2017)
- The Inner Cage (2021)
- Elisa (2025)
