= Francesco Costabile =

Italian film director (born 1980)

- Born: 30 September 1980 (age 45); Cosenza, Italy
- Occupation: Film director

Francesco Costabile (born 30 September 1980) is an Italian film director and screenwriter.

== Life and career ==
Born in Cosenza, Costabile studied at the DAMS (Disciplines of Arts, Music, and Entertainment) department at the University of Bologna, and later at the Centro Sperimentale di Cinematografia. He made his professional debut in 2003 with the short film La sua Gamba, and in 2006 won a Nastro d'Argento and received a David di Donatello nomination for the short Dentro Roma.

After directing several documentary films, Costabile made his feature film debut with Una Femmina: The Code of Silence, which premiered in the Panorama section of the 72nd Berlin International Film Festival. The film got Costabile two David di Donatello nominations, for best directorial debut and for best screenplay. His following film Familia premiered at the 81st Venice International Film Festival in the Orizzonti sidebar. The film received 8 David di Donatello Award nominations, including one for Costabile for best adapted screenplay.

== Filmography ==
- L'abito e il volto - Incontro con Piero Tosi (documentary, 2009)
- La Carrera (documentary, 2013, co-directed with Assunta Nugnes)
- Piero Tosi 1690 - L'inizio di un secolo (documentary, 2014)
- In un futuro aprile (documentary, 2019, co-directed with Federico Savonitto)
- Una Femmina: The Code of Silence (2022)
- Familia (2024)
