= Edizioni e/o =

Italian independent publishing company

- Founded: 1979
- Founder: Sandro Ferri and Sandra Ozzola
- Country of origin: Italy
- Headquarters location: Rome
- Official website: www.edizionieo.it

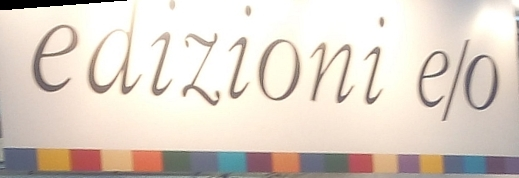

Edizioni E/O is an Italian independent publishing house headquartered in Rome, founded in 1979 by married couple Sandro Ferri and Sandra Ozzola. In 2005, Ferri and Ozzola co-founded the New York-based publishing house Europa Editions, a subsidiary of Edizioni E/O. In 2011, it was followed by Europa Editions UK with headquarters in London.

Among its various authors, Edizioni e/o is the original publisher for the Italian author Elena Ferrante, author of the best-selling Neapolitan Novels.

== History ==
Sandro Ferri was a member of Lotta Continua, he worked at La Vecchia Talpa, a bookstore frequented by members of Rome’s left-wing circles. Sandra Ozzola, his future wife, was born in Turin and graduated in Russian literature. When the spouses decided to launch a publishing house, the original idea was to release fiction by writers from the socialist countries of Eastern Europe, whose works could not be read neither in their home countries, nor in the West. The name E/O is an abbreviation of Est/Ovest, East and West in Italian.

The first book published by E/O was Decline of an Empire: The Soviet Socialist Republics in Revolt by Hélène Carrère d’Encausse. Later they negotiated with Milan Kundera, but in the end he chose Adelphi Edizioni to publish The Unbearable Lightness of Being. E/O translated and published in Italy such Eastern European writers as Julian Stryjkowski, Kazimierz Brandys, Christoph Hein, Bohumil Hrabal, Jana Černá, and Christa Wolf, whose books published by E/O have sold a total of 500,000 copies over the years.

In the 1990s, the publishers concentrated mostly on American literature. They released books by Joyce Carol Oates, Alice Munro, Thomas Pynchon. A commercial success of that period came in the mid-1990s with the so-called mediterranean noir: Massimo Carlotto's series Alligatore which sold a total of 800,000 copies; and Jean-Claude Izzo's Marseille Trilogy.

Since 1992, they have been publishing Elena Ferrante, a best-selling author that became hugely successful abroad. By 2016, Ferrante's most famous novels had sold a total of 3.7 million copies in the United States, England, and Italy. Her books accounted for 70% of the publishing house’s revenue.

In 2005, Ferri and Ozzola co-founded the New York-based publishing house Europa Editions, a subsidiary of Edizioni e/o, intended to publish and distribute their books in the USA. Through the years, they introduced Muriel Barbery, Amélie Nothomb, Valérie Perrin, Alessandro Piperno, Domenico Starnone, Paolo Sorrentino, Amélie Nothomb, and many other Italian authors to the American market.

In 2011, E/O launched Europa Editions UK.

In 2015, the publisher reported a revenue of 20 mln euro. In 2017, the publisher opened an office in Milan. That year, the couple's daughter Eva joined the family business.

In December 2017, E/O refused to sell their books on Amazon and publicly condemned the company's monopolistic practices.

In 2024, they launched Ne/oN Libri, the new imprint dedicated entirely to fantasy and genre fiction.
