= Gennaro Pantalena =

Italian actor

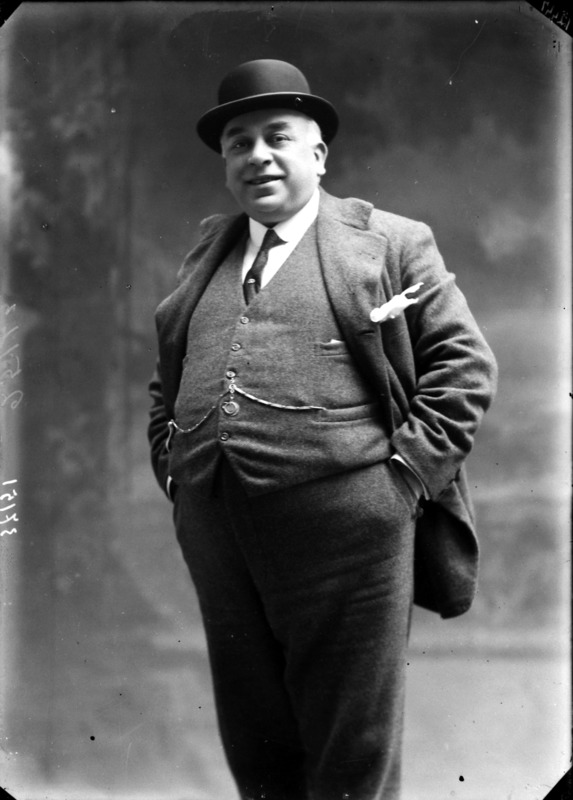
- Born: 13 October 1848; Naples, Campania, Kingdom of the Two Sicilies
- Died: 23 May 1915 (aged 66); Naples, Campania, Italy
- Occupation: Actor

Gennaro Pantalena (1848–1915) was an Italian actor-manager and playwright. He developed a reputation as a character actor in Neapolitan theatre, appearing in the companies of Eduardo Scarpetta and Federico Stella. By 1888 he led his own company which took up residence in the city's Teatro Nuovo. He wrote several works in the Neapolitan dialect. In 1909 he directed and starred in Salvatore Di Giacomo's Assunta Spina.

He also appeared in a single silent film La fuga del gatto made in 1914. He died the following year.

== Bibliography ==
- Bender, Robert Gene. The Dialect Theatre of Eduardo de Filippo. Stanford University, 1963.
- Maurino, Ferdinando Dante. Salvatore Di Giacomo and Neapolitan Dialectal Literature. S.F. Vanni, 1951.
