= Marianna Fontana =

Italian actress

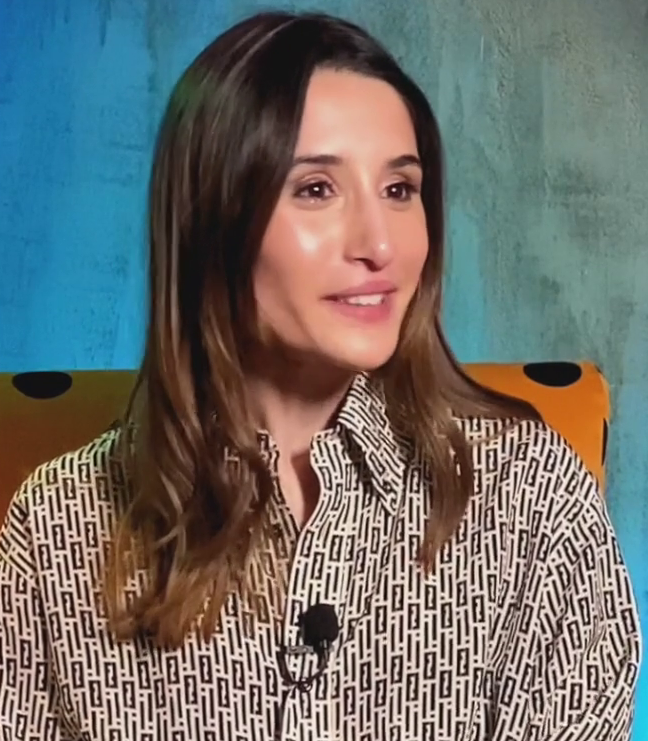
- Born: 24 April 1997 (age 29); Maddaloni, Italy
- Occupations: Actress; singer
- Years active: 2016–present
- Relatives: Angela (twin sister, actress)

Marianna Fontana (born 24 April 1997) is an Italian actress and singer. She starred with her twin sister Angela in Indivisible and had the lead role in Capri-Revolution. She played Ilia in the epic TV series Romulus.

== Discography ==
=== Singles ===
Single	Year	Peak chart positions	Certifications	Album
Single	Year	ITA	Certifications	Album
"Abbi pietà di noi" (Enzo Avitabile featuring Marianna Fontana and Angela Fontana)	2016	—		Lotto infinito

== Filmography ==
=== Films ===
Year	Title	Role	Notes
2014	Perez.	Girl at party	Uncredited cameo
2016	Indivisible	Daisy	Winner – David di Donatello for Best Screenplay; Winner – David di Donatello for Best Original Song
2018	Capri-Revolution	Lucia	Winner – Ciak d'oro for Best Actress; Nominated – David di Donatello for Best Actress
2021	I fratelli De Filippo	Adele Carloni-De Filippo	
2023	Double Soul	Anna	
2023	L'ultima volta che siamo stati bambini	Sister Agnese	
2024	La seconda vita	Anna	
2024	Criature	Anna	

=== Television ===
Year	Title	Role	Notes
2020–2022	Romulus	Ilia	Main role
2021	Carosello Carosone	Carolina Daino	Television film
