= A Girl Returned (film) =

2021 Italian-Swiss drama film

- Directed by: Giuseppe Bonito
- Screenplay by: Donatella Di Pietrantonio; Monica Zapelli
- Produced by: Mario Mazzarotto
- Starring: Sofia Fiore; Vanessa Scalera; Fabrizio Ferracane
- Cinematography: Alfredo Betrò
- Edited by: Roberto Missiroli
- Music by: Giuliano Taviani; Carmelo Travia
- Release date: 2021
- Language: Italian

A Girl Returned (Italian: L'Arminuta) is a 2021 Italian-Swiss drama film directed by Giuseppe Bonito. It is based on the novel of the same name, by Donatella Di Pietrantonio.

== Cast ==
- Sofia Fiore as Arminuta
- Vanessa Scalera as the mother
- Fabrizio Ferracane as the father
- Carlotta De Leonardis as Adriana
- Elena Lietti as Adalgisa
- Andrea Fuorto as Vincenzo

== Production ==
The film is based on the novel A Girl Returned by Donatella Di Pietrantonio, who co-wrote the screenplay with Monica Zapelli. It was produced by Maro Film, Baires and Kaf with Rai Cinema.

== Release ==
The film had its premiere at the 2021 Rome Film Festival, where it was awarded the BNL Prize. It was theatrically released in Italy by Lucky Red on 21 October 2021.

== Accolades ==
Award	Date of ceremony	Category	Recipient(s)	Result	Ref.
David di Donatello	3 May 2022	Best Adapted Screenplay	Monica Zapelli and Donatella Di Pietrantonio	Won	
David di Donatello	3 May 2022	Best Supporting Actress	Vanessa Scalera	Nominated	
David di Donatello	3 May 2022	Best Original Song	Giuliano Taviani, Carmelo Travia, Marianna Travia	Nominated	
Premio Flaiano	3 July 2022	Best Film	A Girl Returned	Won	
Globo d'oro	4 October 2022	Best Newcomer	Sofia Fiore	Won	
Globo d'oro	4 October 2022	Best Film	A Girl Returned	Nominated	
Globo d'oro	4 October 2022	Best Actress	Vanessa Scalera	Nominated	
