= Ennio (film) =

2021 documentary film

- Film poster
- Directed by: Giuseppe Tornatore
- Written by: Giuseppe Tornatore
- Produced by: Gabriele Costa; Gianni Russo; Peter de Maegd; San Fu Maltha
- Cinematography: Giancarlo Leggeri; Fabio Zamarion
- Edited by: Massimo Quaglia; Annalisa Schillaci
- Music by: Ennio Morricone
- Production companies: Piano B Produzioni; Potemkino; Fu Works; Terras; Gaga. Eurimages
- Distributed by: Music Box Films
- Release date: 10 September 2021 (Venice)
- Running time: 150 minutes
- Countries: Italy; Belgium; Japan; Netherlands
- Languages: Italian; English
- Box office: $4.3 million

Ennio: The Maestro (Italian: Ennio), also known as The Glance of Music, is a 2021 documentary film directed by Giuseppe Tornatore, celebrating the life and legacy of the Italian composer Ennio Morricone, who died on 6 July 2020. The film consists of interviews with directors, screenwriters, musicians, songwriters, critics and collaborators who have worked with him or who have enjoyed him throughout his long career.

== Content ==
Giuseppe Tornatore, Oscar-winning director, pays tribute to his friend and collaborator Ennio Morricone, retracing the life and works of the Italian composer, from his debut with Sergio Leone to the Oscar Award for The Hateful Eight in 2016. The film comprises interviews with renowned directors and musicians, recordings of some of the maestro's acclaimed world tours, clips from some iconic films set to music by Morricone and exclusive footage of the scenes and places that defined Morricone's life.

== Interviewees ==
The following artists appear in the film:

- Ennio Morricone
- Giuseppe Tornatore
- Carlo Verdone
- Clint Eastwood
- Quentin Tarantino
- Oliver Stone
- Hans Zimmer
- Barry Levinson
- Dario Argento
- Bernardo Bertolucci
- Quincy Jones
- Bruce Springsteen
- Lina Wertmüller
- Marco Bellocchio
- Paolo Taviani
- Vittorio Taviani
- Zucchero Fornaciari
- Roland Joffé
- John Williams
- Enzo G. Castellari
- Alessandro De Rosa
- Pat Metheny
- Mike Patton
- James Hetfield
- Joan Baez
- Wong Kar-wai

== Release ==
The film premiered on 10 September 2021 at the 78th Venice International Film Festival. It was released in Italian cinemas on 27 January 2022, and digital platforms on 22 April 2022.

The film was a box-office success in Italy.

== Reception ==
=== Critical response ===
On the review aggregator website Rotten Tomatoes, 91% of 52 critics' reviews are positive, with an average rating of 7.8/10. The website's consensus reads: "Attenzione! The man who came out of post-war Italy to revolutionize the Western, Maestro Ennio Morricone, is masterfully captured in a documentary befitting his genius." Metacritic, which uses a weighted average, assigned the film a score of 75 out of 100, based on 15 critics, indicating "generally favorable" reviews.

A review in The Guardian stated:

his documentary represents a painstakingly detailed, fantastically entertaining, and profoundly exhausting deep dive into the career of the hyper-prolific Italian composer Ennio Morricone, known best perhaps for his orchestral scores for Sergio Leone (including the so-called Dollars Trilogy and Once Upon a Time in the West), Gillo Pontecorvo's The Battle of Algiers, Bernardo Bertolucci's 1900 – and a whole bunch of American films, ranging from the great (Terrence Malick’s Days of Heaven, Brian De Palma’s The Untouchables) to the abominable (Quentin Tarantino's The Hateful Eight)

while another review in the same newspaper deemed that "As a piece of film-making, this documentary is cumbersome, repetitive and ploddingly conventional – all traits that were anathema to its subject, the late Italian film composer Ennio Morricone (1928–2020)." A review in The Irish Times merged those divided assessments by saying "Tributes become repetitive but there's much to enjoy in this documentary about Ennio Morricone".

=== Awards ===
The film won the Nastro d'Argento 2022 for Best Documentary Film.
