= Una Femmina: The Code of Silence =

- Directed by: Francesco Costabile
- Screenplay by: Lirio Abbate; Francesco Costabile; Serena Brugnolo; Adriano Chiarelli
- Story by: Lirio Abbate; Edoardo De Angelis
- Starring: Lina Siciliano; Fabrizio Ferracane
- Cinematography: Giuseppe Maio
- Edited by: Stefano Mariotti
- Music by: Valerio Camporini Faggioni
- Distributed by: Medusa Film
- Release date: 2022
- Language: Italian

Una Femmina: The Code of Silence (Italian: Una femmina, lit. 'A woman') is a 2022 Italian crime drama film co-written and directed by Francesco Costabile, at his directiorial debut. It is loosely based on an investigative book by Lirio Abbate, with the main character Rosa incorporating various characters and stories of the book.

The film premiered in the Panorama section of the 72nd Berlin International Film Festival, and was later screened at the 56th Karlovy Vary International Film Festival. It was nominated for two David di Donatello awards, for best new director and for best screenplay. At the 2022 Nastro d'Argento, Lina Siciliano was awarded Revelation Actress of the Year.

== Plot ==
Rosa is a restless and rebellious girl, living with her grandmother and uncle in a small village in Calabria. Her mother died mysteriously when Rosa is still a child, and her death lies behind the most absolute omertà on the part of her town and of her own family. Following the assault on a young prostitute by her cousin Natale, Rosa reconnects with that childhood trauma, and thanks to Gianni, a young guardian of the town cemetery, she decides to discover the truth and redeem her mother's memory.

== Cast ==
- Lina Siciliano as Rosa
- Fabrizio Ferracane as Salvatore
- Anna Maria De Luca as Berta
- Simona Malato as Rita
- Luca Massaro as Natale
- Mario Russo as Gianni
- Vincenzo Di Rosa as Ciccio
- Francesca Ritrovato as Cetta

== Reception ==
La Nación critic Paula Vázquez Prieto described the film as "opaque and tinged with ocher", conveying "a painful and inalienable beauty, a paradise plagued by death and resignation".
