= Indivisible (2016 film) =

2016 film

- Film poster
- Directed by: Edoardo De Angelis
- Written by: Edoardo De Angelis
- Starring: Angela Fontana; Marianna Fontana
- Release dates: 4 September 2016 (Venice); 29 September 2016 (Italy)
- Running time: 100 minutes
- Country: Italy
- Language: Italian

Indivisible (Italian: Indivisibili) is a 2016 Italian drama film directed by Edoardo De Angelis. It premiered in the Venice Days section at the 73rd Venice International Film Festival and was later screened in the Contemporary World Cinema section at the 2016 Toronto International Film Festival.

== Cast ==
- Angela Fontana as Daisy
- Marianna Fontana as Viola
- Massimiliano Rossi as Peppe
- Antonia Truppo as Titti
- Gianfranco Gallo as Don Salvatore
- Toni Laudadio as Nunzio
- Peppe Servillo as Alfonso Fasano
- Antonio Pennarella as Salvo Coriace

== Reception ==
Indivisible has an approval rating of 91% on review aggregator website Rotten Tomatoes, based on 23 reviews, and an average rating of 6.9/10. Metacritic assigned the film a weighted average score of 80 out of 100, based on 10 critics, indicating "generally favorable reviews".
