= Sweet Dreams (2016 film) =

- Theatrical release poster
- Directed by: Marco Bellocchio
- Screenplay by: Marco Bellocchio; Valia Santella; Edoardo Albinati
- Based on: Sweet Dreams, Little One by Massimo Gramellini
- Produced by: Beppe Caschetto
- Starring: Valerio Mastandrea; Bérénice Bejo
- Cinematography: Daniele Ciprì
- Edited by: Francesca Calvelli
- Music by: Carlo Crivelli
- Production companies: IBC Movie; Kavac Film; Rai Cinema; Ad Vitam
- Distributed by: 01 Distribution (Italy); Ad Vitam (France)
- Release dates: 12 May 2016 (Cannes); 10 November 2016 (Italy); 28 December 2016 (France)
- Running time: 131 minutes
- Countries: Italy; France
- Language: Italian
- Budget: €5 million
- Box office: $1.9 million

Sweet Dreams (Italian: Fai bei sogni) is a 2016 Italian-language biographical drama film directed and co-written by Marco Bellocchio. It is based on the novel Sweet Dreams, Little One by Massimo Gramellini. It was screened in the Directors' Fortnight section at the 2016 Cannes Film Festival. It was theatrically released in Italy by 01 Distribution on 10 November 2016.

== Cast ==
- Bérénice Bejo
- Valerio Mastandrea
- Fabrizio Gifuni
- Guido Caprino
- Barbara Ronchi
- Emmanuelle Devos
- Miriam Leone
- Francesco Scianna
- Linda Messerklinger

== Production ==
The screenplay is based on Massimo Gramellini's 2012 novel Sweet Dreams, Little One. The film was produced by IBC Movie, Kavac Film, Rai Cinema and France's Ad Vitam. It received 800,000 euros in support from the Ministry of Cultural Heritage and Activities and Tourism. The full budget was five million euro.

The film was shot in Turin. Filming began on 4 May 2015 and lasted eight weeks.

== See also ==
- List of Italian films of 2016
