= The Inner Cage =

- Directed by: Leonardo Di Costanzo
- Screenplay by: Leonardo Di Costanzo; Bruno Oliviero; Valia Santella
- Starring: Toni Servillo; Silvio Orlando
- Cinematography: Luca Bigazzi
- Music by: Pasquale Scialò
- Release dates: September 5, 2021 (Venice); October 14, 2021 (Italy)
- Running time: 117 minutes
- Language: Italian

The Inner Cage (Italian: Ariaferma, from aria ferma 'still air') is a 2021 Italian-Swiss prison drama film co-written and directed by Leonardo Di Costanzo.

The film premiered out of competition at the 78th Venice International Film Festival. The film won two David di Donatello Awards, for best original screenplay and for best actor (Silvio Orlando).

== Plot ==
An old prison built in the 19th century, located in a remote and unspecified part of the Italian territory, is being decommissioned. As a result of bureaucratic holdups the transfers have been blocked and a dozen inmates are left, along with a few guards, waiting to be sent to new destinations.

== Cast ==
- Toni Servillo: Gaetano Gargiulo
- Silvio Orlando: Carmine Lagioia
- Fabrizio Ferracane: Franco Coletti
- Salvatore Striano: Cacace
- Roberto De Francesco: Buonocore

== Reception ==
The Inner Cage has an approval rating of 89% on review aggregator website Rotten Tomatoes, based on 9 reviews, and an average rating of 7/10.

== Distribution ==
After being presented out of competition at the Venice exhibition, the film was distributed in Italian cinemas starting from 14 October 2021.
