= Eduardo Scarpetta =

Italian actor and playwright (1853–1925)

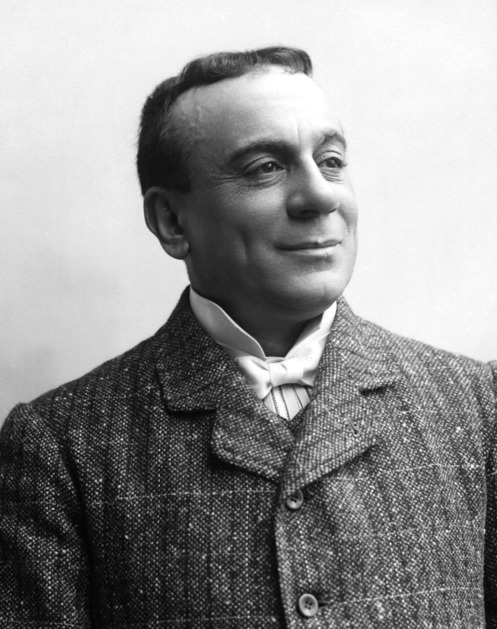
- Born: 13 March 1853; Naples, Kingdom of the Two Sicilies
- Died: 12 November 1925 (aged 72); Naples, Kingdom of Italy
- Occupations: Actor, playwright
- Spouse: Rosa De Filippo (m. 1876)
- Partner: Luisa De Filippo
- Children: 9, including Vincenzo Scarpetta and Eduardo, Titina and Peppino De Filippo
- Relatives: Luca De Filippo (grandson); Luigi De Filippo (grandson); Eduardo Scarpetta (great-great-grandson)
- Website: eduardoscarpetta.it

Eduardo Scarpetta (Italian pronunciation: [eduˈardo skarˈpetta]; 13 March 1853 – 12 November 1925) was an Italian actor and playwright from Naples. His best-known play is Misery and Nobility.

== Biography ==
Although not from a theatrical family, he was on the stage by the age of four and is today best remembered as the creator of a character that became his stage alter-ego: Felice Sciosciammocca is a character whose name embodies the quintessential Neapolitan spirit—joyful and wide-eyed with a charming gullibility. The term "Sciosciammocca," which in Neapolitan means "breath in mouth," paints the picture of someone perpetually astounded, perhaps to the point of naiveté, breathing open-mouthed in wonder. Coupled with "Felice" (happy) it denotes a persona that is good-natured and a bit absent-minded, someone who marvels at the world with childlike innocence. The character was a break with the traditional portrayal of the Neapolitan streetwise Everyman and, as an implied stereotype, invites comparison to the well-known, darker historical Neapolitan "mask" of Pulcinella. The character appears prominently in Scarpetta's best-known work, Miseria e Nobiltà (Misery and Nobility) from the year 1888. The work is well known, too, as a 1954 film featuring Neapolitan comic Totò as Felice Sciosciammocca; the film also features a young Sophia Loren.

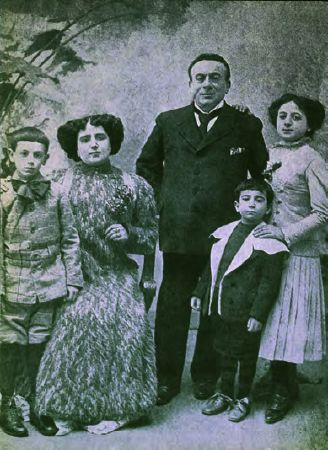
Scarpetta and Luisa De Filippo (center) with their children. Left to right: Eduardo, Peppino and Titina De Filippo

Scarpetta dedicated much of his early activity to translating into Neapolitan the standard Parisian farce comedy of the day, such as Hennequin, Meilhac, Labiche and Feydeau. His own original comedies comprise some 50 works. He was the illegitimate father of actor and playwright Eduardo De Filippo as well as of Eduardo's brother and sister, Peppino and Titina. He was also a mentor to the actor Gennaro Pantalena who appeared as part of his company.

In 2021, director Mario Martone realized a movie based on the last period of Scarpetta's career, titled Qui rido io (Here I'm the one who laughs, after the inscription on Scarpetta's mansion), and it had its world premiere in competition at the 78th Venice International Film Festival; the role was played by Toni Servillo.

== Plays ==
1875 - Gelusia ovvero Ammore spusalizio e gelusia
1876 - Ov'è mammà?
1876 - 'Na commedia 'e tre atte
1876 - Quinnice solde so' cchiù assaie de seimilalire
1876 - È buscia o verità?
1877 - Felice maestro di callegrafia ovvero Lu curaggio de nu pompiere napulitano
1879 - Feliciello e Feliciella
1879 - Li testamenti di Parasacco
1879 - La collana d'oro
1880 - L'Accademia disturbata
1880 - Le treccia dell'Imperatore
1880 - La Presentazione de 'na compagnia ovvero Felice direttore di compagnia
1880 - Tetillo (da Bébé di Alfred Hennequin e Émile de Najac)
1880 - Mettiteve a fa l'ammore cu me! (from Salvestri)
1880 - Li Piscivinnole napulitane
1880 - Tric Trac (from Guarino)
1880 - Lu pescecane
1880 - 'Nu zio ciuccio e 'nu nepote scemo (from F. Cerlone)
1880 - Duje marite 'mbrugliune (from A. Hennequin and A. Delacour)
1880 - Bazzicotto
1880 - Il non plus ultra della disperazione ovvero La Battaglia del Rigoletto; I duelli; Lu Pagnottino.
1881 - Lo scarfalietto (from Meilhac and Halévy)
1881 - Vi' che m'ha fatto frateme
1881 - Tetillo 'nzurato
1881 - Le Bravure di Don Felice
1881 - La posta in quarta pagina
1881 - Tre pecore viziose
1881 - L'amico 'e papà
1881 - 'No pasticcio
1881 - La casa numero sette
1882 - Il romanzo di un farmacista povero
1882 - 'A fortuna 'e Feliciello
1882 - Nun la trovo a mmaretà
1882 - La nutriccia
1882 - Fifì
1882 - 'No quartino a lu quinto piano
1882 - 'Na commedia a vapore
1883 - 'Nu frongillo cecato
1883 - Amore e polenta
1883 - Na paglia 'e Firenze
1883 - 'Na furnata de paura
1883 - 'Na tombola 'e duemila lire
1883 - 'Nu buono giuvinotto
1883 - S'ha da dì o no?>br> 1883 - La signorina Piripipì
1883 - 'Nu casino sotto a lu Vesuvio
1884 - 'Na capa sciacquata
1884 - La calamita
1884 - 'Nu brutto difetto
1884 - 'Na matassa 'mbrugliata
1885 - 'Na società 'e marite
1885 - Un'agenzia di matrimoni
1885 - Li nepute de lu sinneco (from Burani)
1885 - Lu marito de Nannina (from Alexandre Bisson)
1886 - 'O viaggio 'e nozze
1887 - 'Nu bastone 'e fuoco
1888 - Miseria e nobiltà
1888 - 'Nu turco napulitano (from A. Hennequin)
1889 - Lu miedeco de li femmene ovvero Il dottor Suricillo
1889 - 'Na Santarella (from Henri Meilhac and Albert Millaud)
1889 - Girolino e Pirolé
1890 - Pazzie di Carnevale (from Antonio Petito)
1890 - Il Matrimonio di stella
1890 - Casà Bignè
1890 - Na stampa e doje figure
1891 - Il capitano Saetta
1892 - Guerra agli uomini
1892 - Cocò
1893 - 'Na mugliera scurnosa
1893 - Lu Cafè Chantant
1893 - Li cafune a Napule
1893 - Lily e Mimì
1894 - 'Nu ministro mmiezzo a li guaie (from Eraldo Baretti)
1894 - Li mariuole ovvero La Contessa tre cape
1894 - Farfariello
1894 - Tre cazune furtunate'
1895 - 'Na bona guagliona
1895 - La casa vecchia
1896 - La Bohème
1896 - I tre soci
1896 - L'albergo del silenzio
1897 - Le due stelle
1897 - Casa Pipiton
1897 - La belle sciantose
1897 - Zetiallo, vidovo e nzurato
1897 - 'Na mascatura inglese
1898 - Nina Boné
1898 - Nu cane bastardo
1899 - Madama Ficcarelli
1899 - 'Na creatura sperduta
1899 - La pupa mobile
1899 - 'A cammerera nova
1899 - Duje chiapparielle
1899 - 'Na figliola romantica
1900 - 'A figlia 'e don Gennaro
1900 - 'A nanassa
1901 - Cane e gatte
1901 - Tutti in viaggio
1901 - Il debutto di Gemma
1902 - Carcere e matrimonio
1902 - 'A Mosca
1902 - Madama Rollè
1902 - Madama Sangenella
1902 - 'O balcone 'e Rusinella
1903 - 'Na mugliera africana
1903 - 'Nu figlio a pusticcio
1903 - Il processo fiaschella
1903 - Li male lengue
1904 - 'Nu core d'angelo
1904 - Il figlio di Iorio
1905 - La geisha
1907 - 'Na mugliera zetella
1907 - 'Na brutta pazzia
1908 - 'O miedeco d'e pazze
1909 - La coda del diavolo
1915 - Tre epoche
1923 - Nu disastro ferroviario
1924 - Woronoff
