= Donatella Di Pietrantonio =

Italian writer born in 1962

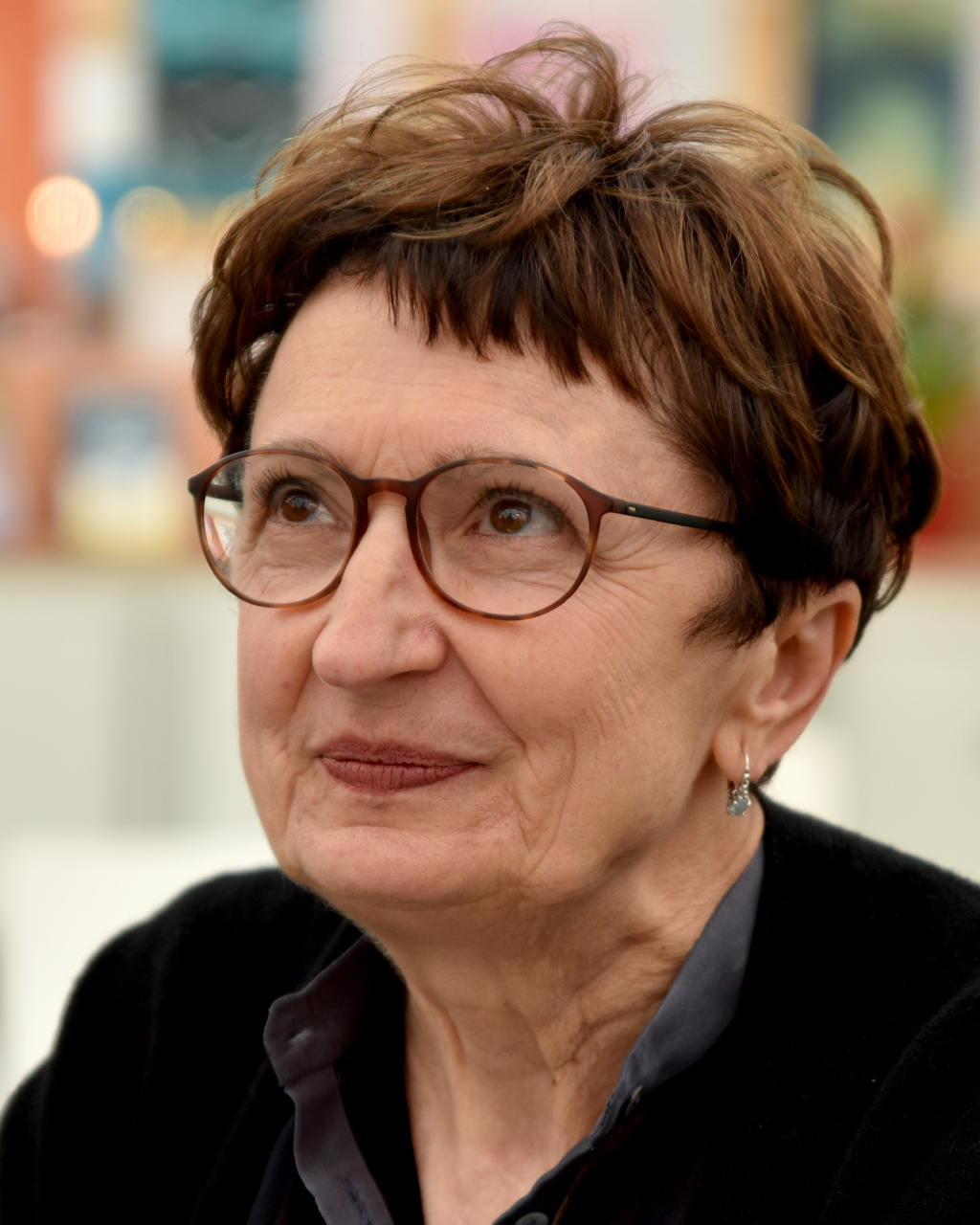
Donatella Di Pietrantonio (2022)

Donatella di Pietrantonio (Arsita, January 5, 1962) is an Italian writer who is best known for her novels My Mother is a River and A Girl Returned.

== Life and career ==
She was born in Arsita, in the province of Teramo, and first moved to study in L'Aquila where, in 1986, she graduated in Dentistry at the local University, then in Penne, in the province of Pescara, where she practiced as a pediatric dentist. She made her debut as a writer in 2011 with the novel My mother is a river, set in her native land of Abruzzo. In the same year she published the story Lo scargio in Granta Italia.

In 2013, she published her second novel, Bella mia, dedicated to and set in L'Aquila. The work, influenced by the tragedy of the 2009 earthquake and focused on the theme of loss and mourning, was nominated for the Strega Prize and won the Brancati Prize in 2014.

In 2017, she published her third novel for Einaudi, L'Arminuta, also set in Abruzzo; the title is a dialectal term that can be translated into «the returned». The book explores the theme of the mother-child relationship in its most anomalous and pathological aspects, and it was the winner of the Campiello Prize and the Naples Prize. From the novel was taken, in 2019, a theatrical show produced by the Teatro Stabile d'Abruzzo and, in 2021, a film directed by Giuseppe Bonito.

Also in 2017, she was awarded the Order of the Minerva by the "Gabriele d'Annunzio" University of Chieti. In 2020, again for Einaudi, she published Borgo Sud, also set in Abruzzo and considered the sequel to L'Arminuta, as it describes successive stories of the two sisters who were the protagonists of the previous novel. The work was selected to participate in the 2021 edition of the Strega Prize, finishing in second place, and received the Basilicata Literary Prize in the "Narrative" section. She won the 2024 Strega Prize with her novel L'età fragile ("The frail age"). the novel was inspired by the 1997 Morrone killings.

== Works ==
=== Novels ===
- Mia Madre è un Fiume, 2011. Translated to English as My Mother is a River.
- Bella mia, 2013.
- L'Arminuta, 2017. Translated to English as A Girl Returned.
- Borgo Sud, 2020. In English, A Sister's Story, translated by Ann Goldstein.
- L'età fragile, 2023. Translated into English as The Brittle Age (translation to be released in 2025).

=== Short stories ===
- Lo sfregio, Granta Italia N° 2.
