= Lirio Abbate =

Italian journalist (born 1971

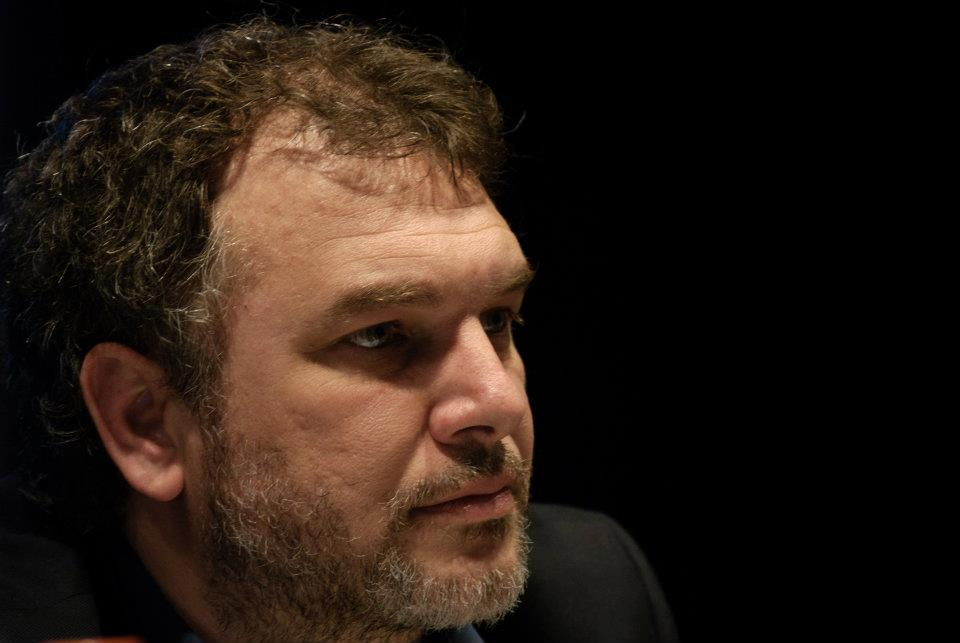
- Abbate at the 2011 International Journalism Festival
- Born: 28 February 1971 (age 55); Castelbuono, Italy
- Occupations: Journalist, editor-in-chief
- Employers: L'Espresso; ANSA; La Stampa

Lirio Abbate (born 26 February 1971) is an Italian journalist and editor-in-chief of the Italian weekly news magazine L'Espresso. Before joining the magazine, he was a correspondent from Sicily for the news agency ANSA and the national newspaper La Stampa.

== Early life and career ==
Abbate was born in Castelbuono, in the province of Palermo, and started his journalistic career in 1990 at the Giornale di Sicilia, where he work until 1997 when he moved to ANSA. In 1998 he also started working for La Stampa. In 2003, he was elected Journalist of the Year by Unione Nazionale Cronisti (UNCI). He reported on the Sicilian Mafia and clandestine immigration on the Sicilian coast. He was the only journalist to be present during the arrest in April 2006 of the "boss of bosses" of Cosa Nostra, Bernardo Provenzano, who was jailed after 43 years on the run.

== Mafia threats and later career ==
Abbate angered the Mafia with a book published in 2007 with his colleague Peter Gomez called I Complici ("The Accomplices") about links between politicians and Bernardo Provenzano. When wiretapped mafiosi were heard discussing how to silence Abbate in revenge for his news reports and book, police decided to give him and his wife a police escort. On the night of 2 September 2007, his police bodyguards surprised two men placing a home-made bomb under his car. This murder attempt came a few days after he had returned to Palermo and after several months of threats following the publication of his book. Mafia boss Leoluca Bagarella threatened him publicly during a trial in October 2007. “I have been more worried since this case,” said Abbate. “Bagarella sent a message to his accomplices giving my name in open court. He has been in prison since 1995 and since I work for a news agency, my articles are not by-lined. How did he know that it was me who had written any particular article?”

Despite the threats and police escort, Abbate did not leave Palermo. He said: "If I left after they put a bomb under my car, I would be setting a bad example to other Sicilians," he said. "This way I am showing that I am not afraid, that the state is protecting me, and that I will carry on." In 2009, Abbate left Palermo to work in Rome. He created and wrote a docufilm about Massimo Carminati, titled L'uomo Nero − Storia di Massimo Carminati, for La7, For Sky Atlantic, he wrote and edited Barrio Milano, a docuseries about Latin American gangs in Milan.

In 2015, on motu proprio, the president of the Italian Republic awarded Abbare the Officer of the Order of Merit of the Italian Republic. In January 2016, he was appointed editor-in-chief responsible for the "Investigations" and "Current affairs" sections of L'Espresso. In 2016, he was coordinator of the team that created the protected RegeniLeaks platform for L'Espresso to collect testimonies from whistleblowers on torture and human rights violations, and to demand justice for Giulio Regeni and for all the victims of the security services Egyptians, in collaboration with the Hermes Center for Transparency and Digital Human Rights.

From 2016 to 2017, Abbate was part of the International Council on Justice of the Dicastery for Promoting Integral Human Development of the Vatican, chaired by Cardinal Peter K. A. Turkson. Since 29 November 2017, he has been deputy director of the weekly L'Espresso, of which he has become director since 4 March 2022, replacing the resigning Marco Damilano. On 21 December 2022, he was replaced as director by Alessandro Mauro Rossi.

== Bibliography ==
- (in Italian) Nostra mafia dei monti - dal processo alle cosche delle Madonie al caso Contrada, Spoleto: Dharba Editore 1993
- (in Italian) La storia del giro podistico di Castelbuono - La corsa su strada più antica d'Italia, Palermo: Promos Editore, 1994
- (in Italian) La mafia che ho conosciuto, Edizioni Espero 1996
- (in Italian) I complici. Tutti gli uomini di Bernardo Provenzano da Corleone al Parlamento (with Peter Gomez), Rome: Fazi Editore 2007 ISBN 978-88-8112-786-3
