= Valia Santella =

Italian screenwriter and director (born 1965)

- Born: 24 May 1965 (age 61); Naples, Italy
- Occupations: Screenwriter and film director

Valia Santella (born 24 May 1965) is an Italian screenwriter and film director.

== Life and career ==
Born in Naples, Italy, Valia Santella is the daughter of the actors Mario and Maria Luisa Santella. Starting from the 1990 film Matilda by Antonietta De Lillo and Giorgio Magliulo, for about a decade she worked as a script supervisor, becoming a close collaborator of Nanni Moretti. In 2004 she made her directorial debut with I Can See It in Your Eyes, which premiered at the 61st Venice International Film Festival in the Horizons sidebar. Starting from Valeria Golino's Miele, she focused on screenwriting, collaborating with Moretti, Marco Bellocchio, Ferzan Özpetek, and Leonardo Di Costanzo, among others.

Between 2019 and 2020, Santella won the David di Donatello for best screenplay and the Nastro d'Argento in the same category for Bellocchio's The Traitor. In 2022, she won a second David di Donatello for the screenplay of Leonardo Di Costanzo's The Inner Cage.

== Selected filmography ==
- I Can See It in Your Eyes (2004, also director)
- Miele (2013)
- Me Romantic Romani (2014)
- Mia Madre (2015)
- Pericle (2016)
- Sweet Dreams (2016)
- Red Istanbul (2017)
- Naples in Veils (2017)
- Euphoria (2018)
- The Traitor (2019)
- The Inner Cage (2021)
- Three Floors (2021)
- A Brighter Tomorrow (2023)
- The Story of Frank and Nina (2024)
- The Art of Joy (2024)
- It Will Happen Tonight (2026)
- The Girl with the Leica (2026)
