= Vincenzo Scarpetta =

Italian actor and director 1877–1952)

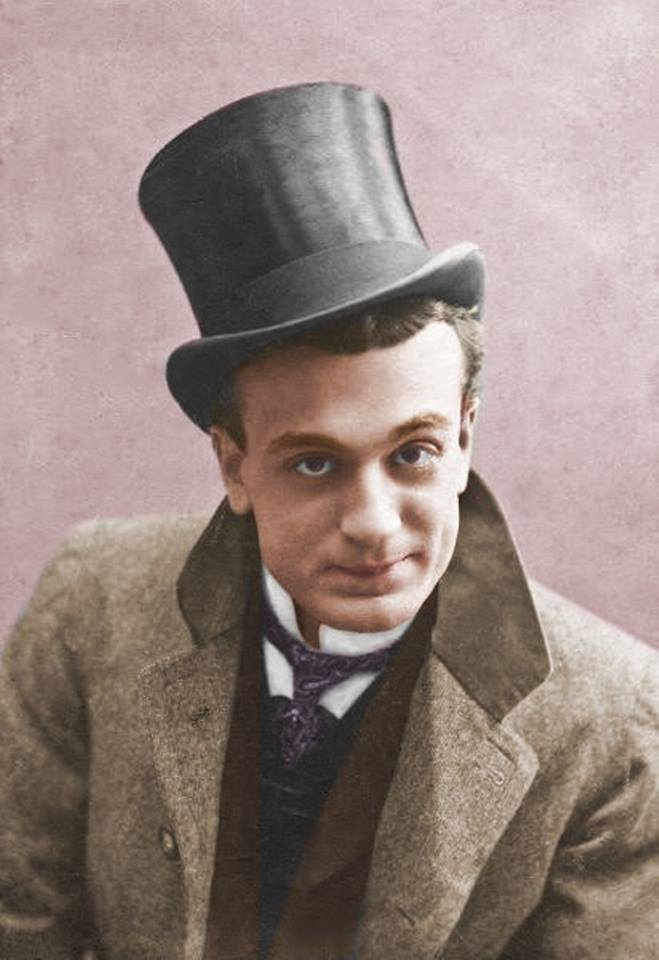
- Born: 19 June 1877; Naples
- Died: 3 August 1952 (aged 75); Naples
- Occupations: Actor, director, playwright, composer
- Years active: 1888–1952
- Parent: Eduardo Scarpetta
- Relatives: Eduardo De Filippo, Peppino De Filippo, Titina De Filippo (step-siblings)

Vincenzo Scarpetta (19 June 1877 – 3 August 1952) was an Italian actor, director, playwright, and composer.

The son of Eduardo Scarpetta, he was the stepbrother of Eduardo De Filippo, Peppino De Filippo, Titina De Filippo, Eduardo Passarelli and Pasquale De Filippo. Upon his father's retirement from the stage, Scarpetta became the head of his theater company. He was one of the pioneers of Neapolitan and Italian cinema.

== Biography ==
His official debut took place at the Mercadante Theater in Naples on 7 January 1888, playing Peppeniello in the first performance of Miseria e Nobiltà, written by his father Eduardo for his debut.

At seventeen, he began writing his first comedies and in 1896 became a permanent member of his father's company, working with his step-siblings Titina, Eduardo, and Peppino De Filippo.

In the early 1910s his father Eduardo Scarpetta retired from the stage and he became the head of the company and lead actor. Upon his father's death (29 November 1925) he inherited the company and, while continuing to write and perform works following his father's repertoire, he also welcomed other authors such as Costagliola and Chiaruzzi, of whom he staged 'A femmena (1925) and L'agnello pasquale (1926), both based on Boccaccio. He also approached Luigi Chiarelli with Chello che simmo e chello che parimmo (1925) (adapted from La maschera e il volto) and Pirandello, as evidenced by the Neapolitan adaptation of Liolà (1931), later staged in 1935 by the De Filippo family.

== Filmography ==
=== Actor ===
- Il suonatore di Chitarra (1910)
- Marito distratto e moglie manesca (1910)
- Tutto per mio fratello (1911)
- Il gallo nel pollaio (1916)
- Scarpetta e l'Americana (1916, released in 1918)
- Le nozze di Vittoria (1917)
- Scarpetta cerca moglie (1920, approximate year)
- Scarpetta vuol fumare (1920, approximate year)
- Gli ultimi giorni di Pompeo (1937)
- La dama bianca (1938)
- Eravamo sette vedove (1938)
- Miseria e nobiltà (1940, second film version)

=== Director ===
- Marito distratto e moglie manesca (1910)
- Il suonatore di chitarra (1910)
- 'O tuono 'e marzo (1912)

=== Writer ===
- Il gallo nel pollaio (1916)
