= Europa Editions =

Independent book publisher based in New York

- Founded: 2005
- Founder: Sandro Ferri (editorial director); Sandra Ozzola (president)
- Country of origin: United States
- Headquarters location: New York City
- Distribution: Publishers Group West (US)
- Key people: Michael Reynolds (Executive Publisher)
- Publication types: Books
- Fiction genres: Literary fiction, general fiction, non-fiction, crime, young adult fiction
- Imprints: Europa Compass, Tonga Books, Europa World Noir, The Passenger, Europa Editions
- Official website: www.europaeditions.com

Europa Editions is an independent trade publisher based in New York. The company was founded in 2005 by the owners of the Italian press Edizioni e/o and specializes in literary fiction, mysteries, and narrative non-fiction.

Europa has published work by authors from over 35 countries during its years in business. In a 2013 interview, co-founder Sandro Ferri said the company was "born with the intention to create bridges between cultures." In 2025, Europa Editions published 38 new titles. Among authors the company has published, Europa counts over a dozen ABA IndieBound bestsellers, six New York Times bestsellers, four Booker Prize-shortlisted novels, and the winners and finalists of many other international literary prizes. In 2013, the New Atlantic Independent Booksellers Association awarded Europa Editions its Paperback Book of the Year award. Europa was listed as one of the fastest growing publishers of 2017 by Publishers Weekly.

== Notable successes ==
Europa's first publication, 2005's The Days of Abandonment by Elena Ferrante (translated by Ann Goldstein), was compared favorably to Anna Karenina in the New York Times and became an Indie Bestseller. Other notable successes at Europa include Muriel Barbery's The Elegance of the Hedgehog (translated by Alison Anderson), which spent over a year on the New York Times and IndieBound bestseller lists; Jane Gardam's Old Filth, named a notable book of the year by the New York Times; Alina Bronsky's The Hottest Dishes of the Tartar Cuisine (translated by Tim Mohr), a Publishers Weekly, Wall Street Journal and San Francisco Chronicle favorite read of the year in 2011; Steve Erickson's Zeroville (a best book of the year pick by the National Book Critics Circle); Breasts and Eggs by Mieko Kawakami, a Time magazine Best Book of the Year and New York Times Notable Book of the Year; and Elena Ferrante's Neapolitan Novels, which James Wood in The New Yorker described as, "intensely, violently personal."

== Physical design ==
Europa Editions uses a uniform look for its trade paperback publications that includes French flaps, a consistent font on the book spines, and the publisher's stork logo on the front of each volume. The covers of Europa's titles are all created by a single designer — Emanuele Ragnisco, owner and director of Rome-based Mekkanografici — and are the fruit of a comprehensive design project developed by Ragnisco and owners Sandro Ferri and Sandra Ozzola.

== Europa Compass ==
Europa's non-fiction imprint, Europa Compass, publishes eight to ten titles a year of narrative non-fiction, books of ideas told by captivating storytellers from around the world.

== Tonga Books ==
In 2011, Europa Editions launched the Tonga imprint, in collaboration with American author Alice Sebold, who chose and edited four works of fiction by debut American authors. The first publication from Tonga Books was Alexander Maksik's debut novel You Deserve Nothing, about a relationship between a teacher at an international school in Paris and one of his students. You Deserve Nothing was described by the New York Times as "rivetingly plotted and beautifully written." The Christian Science Monitor said Maksik's writing was "reminiscent of James Salter's in its sensuality, Francine Prose's capacious inquiry into difficult moral questions and Martin Amis's loose-limbed evocation of the perils of youth." The Tonga Books imprint was discontinued in 2013, but Europa continues to publish works by American authors in its signature imprint.

== Europa World Noir ==
In 2013, Europa Editions launched its series of international crime fiction, Europa World Noir. Publishers Weekly wrote that the series signaled Europa's "reaffirmed enthusiasm for noir." Notable titles in the series include Gene Kerrigan's Gold Dagger Award-winning The Rage, Jean-Claude Izzo's Total Chaos, which launched the Mediterranean Noir movement, and the reissue of groundbreaking Scottish crime writer William McIlvanney's Laidlaw books.

== Europa Editions UK ==
Europa Editions UK was founded in 2012. It is managed and directed by Eva Ferri and Executive Publisher, Michael Reynolds.
