= 54th David di Donatello =

2009 Italian film awards

- Date: 8 May 2009
- Site: Auditorium Conciliazione, Rome, Italy
- Hosted by: Paolo Conticini

Highlights
- Best Picture: Gomorrah
- Most awards: Gomorrah (7)
- Most nominations: Il divo(16)

The 54th David di Donatello ceremony, presented by the Accademia del Cinema Italiano, was held on 8 May 2009.

== Winners and nominees ==
Best Film: Gomorrah, directed by Matteo Garrone; Il divo, directed by Paolo Sorrentino; Many Kisses Later, directed by Fausto Brizzi; Your Whole Life Ahead of You, directed by Paolo Virzì; We Can Do That, directed by Giulio Manfredonia	Best Producer: Domenico Procacci – Gomorrah; Augusto Allegra, Isabella Cocuzza, Giuliana Gamba, Arturo Paglia – Cover Boy; Andrea Occhipinti, Nicola Giuliano, Francesca Cima, Maurizio Coppolecchia – Il divo; Matteo Garrone – Mid-August Lunch; Angelo Rizzoli – We Can Do That
Best Director: Matteo Garrone – Gomorrah; Pupi Avati – Giovanna's Father; Paolo Sorrentino – Il divo; Fausto Brizzi – Many Kisses Later; Giulio Manfredonia – We Can Do That	Best New Director: Gianni Di Gregorio – Mid-August Lunch; Marco Amenta – The Sicilian Girl; Umberto Carteni – Different from Whom?; Tony D'Angelo – Una notte; Marco Pontecorvo – Pa-ra-da
Best Actor: Toni Servillo – Il divo; Luca Argentero – Different from Whom?; Claudio Bisio – We Can Do That; Valerio Mastandrea – Don't Think About It; Silvio Orlando – Giovanna's Father	Best Actress: Alba Rohrwacher – Giovanna's Father; Donatella Finocchiaro – The Brave Men; Claudia Gerini – Different from Whom?; Valeria Golino – Giulia Doesn't Date at Night; Ilaria Occhini – Black Sea
Best Supporting Actor: Giuseppe Battiston – Don't Think About It; Claudio Bisio – Many Kisses Later; Carlo Buccirosso – Il divo; Luca Lionello – Cover Boy; Filippo Nigro – Different from Whom?	Best Supporting Actress: Piera Degli Esposti – Il divo; Sabrina Ferilli – Your Whole Life Ahead of You; Maria Nazionale – Gomorrah; Micaela Ramazzotti – Your Whole Life Ahead of You; Carla Signoris – Many Kisses Later
David di Donatello for Best Screenplay: Maurizio Braucci, Ugo Chiti, Gianni Di Gregorio, Matteo Garrone, Massimo Gaudioso, Roberto Saviano – Gomorrah; Paolo Sorrentino – Il divo; Fausto Brizzi, Marco Martani, Massimiliano Bruno – Many Kisses Later; Fabio Bonifacci, Giulio Manfredonia – We Can Do That; Francesco Bruni, Paolo Virzì – Your Whole Life Ahead of You	Best Cinematography: Luca Bigazzi – Il divo; Arnaldo Catinari – The Demons of St. Petersberg; Marco Onorato – Gomorrah; Italo Petriccione – As God Commands; Vittorio Storaro – Caravaggio
Best Production Design: Francesco Frigeri – The Demons of St. Petersberg; Giancarlo Basili – Sanguepazzo; Paolo Bonfini – Gomorrah; Giantito Burchiellaro – Caravaggio; Lino Fiorito – Il divo	Best Score: Teho Teardo – Il divo; Bruno Zambrini – Many Kisses Later; Baustelle – Giulia Doesn't Date at Night; Paolo Buonvino – Italians; Pivio and Aldo De Scalzi – We Can Do That
Best Original Song: "Herculaneum" from Gomorrah – Robert Del Naja, Neil Davidge; "Il cielo ha una porta sola" from Many Kisses Later – Biagio Antonacci; "Piangi Roma" from Giulia Doesn't Date at Night – Baustelle, Valeria Golino; "Per fare a meno di te" from Solo un padre – Giorgia, Fabrizio Campanelli; "Senza farsi male" from The Man Who Loves – Carmen Consoli	Best Editing: Marco Spoletini – Gomorrah; Esmeralda Calabria – Giulia Doesn't Date at Night; Luciana Pandolfelli – Many Kisses Later; Cristiano Travaglioli – Il divo; Cecilia Zanuso – We Can Do That
Best Sound: Maricetta Lombardo – Gomorrah; Emanuele Cecere – Il divo; Marco Fiumara – Many Kisses Later; Gaetano Carito, Marco Grillo, Bruno Pupparo – Italians; Bruno Pupparo – We Can Do That	Best Costumes: Elisabetta Montaldo – The Demons of St. Petersberg; Alessandra Cardini – Gomorrah; Mario Carlini, Francesco Crivellini – Giovanna's Father; Daniela Ciancio – Il divo; Lia Morandini – Caravaggio
Best Special Visual Effects: Nicola Sganca, Rodolfo Migliari for Vision – Il divo; EDI Effetti Digitali Italiani – As God Commands; Frame by Frame – The Demons of St. Petersberg; Giuseppe Squillaci – Italians; Proxima – Your Whole Life Ahead of You	Best Make-up Artist: Vittorio Sodano – Il divo; Alessandro Bertolazzi – Caravaggio; Enrico Iacoponi – Sanguepazzo; Vincenzo Mastrantonio – Due partite; Luigi Rocchetti – The Demons of St. Petersberg
Best Hairstylist: Aldo Signoretti – Il divo; Enzo Cera – Caravaggio; Maria Teresa Corridoni – Wild Blood; Mirella Ginnoto – The Demons of St. Petersberg; Ferdinando Merolla – The Ladies Get Their Say	Best Documentary Feature: Rata nece biti (La guerra non ci sarà), directed by Daniele Gaglianone; 211: Anna, directed by Giovanna Massimetti and Paolo Serbandini; Come un uomo sulla terra, directed by Andrea Segre, Dagmawi Yimer, Riccardo Biadene; Diario di un curato di montagna, directed by Stefano Saverioni; Non tacere, directed by Fabio Grimaldi
Best Short Film: L'arbitro, directed by Paolo Zucca; L'amore è un giogo, directed by Andrea Rovetta; Bisesto, directed by Giovanni Esposito and Francesco Prisco; Cicatrici, directed by Eros Achiardi; La Madonna della frutta, directed by Paola Randi	Best European Film: Slumdog Millionaire, directed by Danny Boyle; The Class, directed by Laurent Cantet; Lemon Tree, directed by Eran Riklis; The Reader, directed by Stephen Daldry; Waltz with Bashir, directed by Ari Folman
Best Foreign Film: Gran Torino, directed by Clint Eastwood; Milk, directed by Gus Van Sant; The Visitor, directed by Tom McCarthy; The Wrestler, directed by Darren Aronofsky; WALL•E, directed by Andrew Stanton	David Youth Award: We Can Do That, directed by Giulio Manfredonia; Many Kisses Later, directed by Fausto Brizzi; Pa-ra-da, directed by Marco Pontecorvo; The Sicilian Girl, directed by Marco Amenta; Solo un padre, directed by Luca Lucini
Special David Awards: Christian De Sica; Paolo Villaggio, Career David; Virna Lisi, Career David; Fulvio Lucisano, Career David
