= Indigo Film =

Italian film production company

Indigo Film S.r.l.
- Type: Società a responsabilità limitata (S.r.l.)
- Industry: Entertainment
- Founded: 1994; 32 years ago
- Founder: Nicola Giuliano; Francesca Cima; Carlotta Calori
- Headquarters: Rome, Italy
- Products: Films; Television series
- Website: indigofilm.it

Indigo Film S.r.l. is an Italian film and television production company founded by Nicola Giuliano, Francesca Cima, and Carlotta Calori.

== History ==
Indigo Film was founded in 1994 by Nicola Giuliano, Francesca Cima, and Carlotta Calori. The company produced many of Paolo Sorrentino's films, including The Great Beauty, which won the Academy Award for Best International Feature Film and the BAFTA Award for Best Film Not in the English Language.

== Filmography ==
=== Film ===
Year	Title	Director	Ref.
1995	Dorme	Eros Puglielli	
2001	One Man Up	Paolo Sorrentino	
2004	The Consequences of Love	Paolo Sorrentino	
2005	Mario's War	Antonio Capuano	
2005	Apnea	Roberto Dordit	
2006	The Family Friend	Paolo Sorrentino	
2007	The Girl by the Lake	Andrea Molaioli	
2007	Crossing the Line	Pietro Marcello	
2008	Il divo	Paolo Sorrentino	
2009	Someone I Loved	Zabou Breitman	
2009	The Double Hour	Giuseppe Capotondi	
2009	The Mouth of the Wolf	Pietro Marcello	
2010	Afraid of the Dark	Massimo Coppola	
2010	Napoli 24	Various	
2011	The Jewel	Andrea Molaioli	
2011	This Must Be the Place	Paolo Sorrentino	
2011	The Source	Radu Mihăileanu	
2011	Kryptonite!	Ivan Cotroneo	
2011	Ulidi piccola mia	Mateo Zoni	
2012	The Human Cargo	Daniele Vicari	
2013	Slow Food Story	Stefano Sardo	
2013	Welcome Mr. President	Riccardo Milani	
2013	The Great Beauty	Paolo Sorrentino	
2014	The Invisible Boy	Gabriele Salvatores	
2015	Youth	Paolo Sorrentino	
2015	The Wait	Piero Messina	
2015	Me, Myself and Her	Maria Sole Tognazzi	
2016	One Kiss	Ivan Cotroneo	
2016	Slam	Gabriele Salvatores	
2017	Sicilian Ghost Story	Fabio Grassadonia, Antonio Piazza	
2017	Fortunata	Sergio Castellitto	
2018	The Invisible Boy: Second Generation	Gabriele Salvatores	
2018	Put Grandma in the Freezer	Giancarlo Fontana, Giuseppe Stasi	
2018	That's Life	Francesca Mazzoleni	
2018	Euphoria	Valeria Golino	
2018	Capri-Revolution	Mario Martone	
2018	Loro	Paolo Sorrentino	
2018	The Man Who Bought the Moon	Paolo Zucca	
2019	Welcome Back Mr. President	Giancarlo Fontana, Giuseppe G. Stasi	
2019	The Bears' Famous Invasion of Sicily	Lorenzo Mattotti	
2019	The Mayor of Rione Sanità	Mario Martone	
2019	Stolen Days	Guido Lombardi	
2020	Ultras	Francesco Lettieri	
2020	The Players	Stefano Mordini	
2020	Paolo Conte, via con me	Giorgio Verdelli	
2020	Io tu noi, Lucio	Giorgio Verdelli	
2020	The Binding	Domenico Emanuele de Feudis	
2020	Fortuna	Nicolangelo Gelormini	
2021	The Land of the Sons	Claudio Cupellini	
2021	Ezio Bosso: Le cose che restano	Giorgio Verdelli	
2021	The King of Laughter	Mario Martone	
2021	Lovely Boy	Francesco Lettieri	
2021	14 Days	Ivan Cotroneo	
2022	Gianluca Vacchi: Mucho Más	Tommaso Deboni	
2022	Kobe: Una storia italiana	Jesus Garces Lambert	
2022	Princess	Roberto De Paolis	
2022	Burning Hearts	Pippo Mezzapesa	
2022	The Circle	Sophie Chiarello	
2023	The Braid	Laetitia Colombani	
2023	Comandante	Edoardo De Angelis	
2023	Vangelo secondo Maria	Paolo Zucca	
2024	Another End	Piero Messina	
2024	Familia	Francesco Costabile	
2024	Sicilian Letters	Fabio Grassadonia, Antonio Piazza	
2024	No More Trouble - Cosa rimane di una tempesta	Tommaso Romanelli	
2025	A Brief Affair	Ludovica Rampoldi	
2025	Fuori	Mario Martone	
2025	La gioia	Nicolangelo Gelormini	
2025	Hungry Bird	Antonio Capuano	
2025	The Love Scam	Umberto Carteni	
2025	My Tennis Maestro	Andrea Di Stefano	
2025	Primavera	Damiano Michieletto	
2025	Rino Gaetano sempre più blu	Giorgio Verdelli	
2026	A Common Story	Anna Foglietta	
2026	The Echo Chamber	Andrea Pallaoro	
TBA	Permafrost	Lucia Calamaro	
TBA	Il sopravvissuto	Claudio Cupellini	

=== Television ===
Year	Title	Network	Ref.
2013	Una mamma imperfetta	Corriere.it	
2019–2021	The Swan Company	Rai 1	
2019	Non mentire	Canale 5	
2022	The Gymnasts	Paramount+	
2022–present	The Bad Guy	Amazon Prime Video	
TBA	Ferrari	Apple TV+	
TBA	Nemesi	Netflix	
