= David di Donatello for Best Visual Effects =

Italian film award

- Country: Italy
- Presented by: Accademia del Cinema Italiano
- First award: 2004
- Currently held by: Laurent Creusot and Massimo Cipollina for Io capitano (2024)
- Website: www.daviddidonatello.it

The David di Donatello for Best Visual Effects (Italian: David di Donatello per i migliori effetti visivi VFX) is an award presented annually by the Accademia del Cinema Italiano since 2004. It was presented as the David di Donatello for Best Special Visual Effects (Italian: David di Donatello per i migliori effetti speciali visivi) from 2004 to 2012 and the David di Donatello for Best Digital Effects (Italian: David di Donatello per i migliori effetti digitali) from 2013 to 2018.

== Winners and nominees ==
=== 2000s ===
- 2004
  - Ubik Visual Effects - Boss Film – Singing Behind Screens
  - Proxima – Agata and the Storm
  - Digitrace Tech (Rome) – L'apetta Giulia e la Signora Vita
  - Sergio Stivaletti – È già ieri
  - LCD (Florence) – Opopomoz
  - Chinatown – Totò Sapore e la magica storia della pizza
- 2005
  - Grande Mela – After Midnight
  - Paola Trisoglio and Stefano Marinoni – Come into the Light
  - Proxima – Love Returns
  - EDI Effetti Digitali Italiani: Pasquale Croce and Roberto Mestroni – Eyes of Crystal
  - Apocalypse – I tre volti del terrore
- 2006
  - Proxima – Romanzo Criminale
  - Francesco Sabelli - RSG Effetti speciali – Don't Tell
  - EDI Effetti Digitali Italiani – The Fever
  - Guido Pappadà – Fuoco su di me
  - Simone Silvesti – Floor 17
  - UBIK – The Tiger and the Snow
- 2007
  - L'ètude et la supervision des trucages (France) – Golden Door
  - Stefano Coccia, Massimo Contini, Frame by frame, Rebel think, Sirenae Film Post, Spark digital entertainment, Martina Venettoni, VISION – Fascisti su Marte
  - Proxima – Napoleon and Me
  - LUMIQ STUDIOS – The Stone Merchant
  - FX Italia Digital Group – The Lark Farm
- 2008
  - Paola Trisoglio and Stefano Marinoni for Visualogie – The Girl by the Lake
  - Proxima – Quiet Chaos
  - Marbea – Concrete Romance
  - Lee Wilson – Mother of Tears
  - Corrado Virgilio and Vincenzo Nisco – Winx Club: The Secret of the Lost Kingdom
- 2009
  - Nicola Sganga and Rodolfo Migliari for Vision – Il divo
  - EDI Effetti Digitali Italiani – As God Commands
  - Frame by Frame – The Demons of St. Petersberg
  - Giuseppe Squillaci – Italians
  - Proxima – Your Whole Life Ahead of You

=== 2010s ===
- 2010
  - Paola Trisoglio and Stefano Marinoni – Vincere
  - Mario Zanot – Baarìa
  - LIMINA – The Man Who Will Come
  - Ermanno Di Nicola – L'uomo fiammifero
  - EDI Effetti Digitali Italiani – The First Beautiful Thing
- 2011
  - Rebel Alliance – 20 Cigarettes
  - CANECANE – Amici miei – Come tutto ebbe inizio
  - Reset VFX S.r.l. – Christine Cristina
  - Paola Trisoglio, Stefano Marinoni, Paola Randi and Daniele Stirpe Jost – Into Paradiso
- 2012
  - Stefano Marinoni and Paola Trisoglio (Visualogie) – Piazza Fontana: The Italian Conspiracy
  - Palantir Digital Media – The Arrival of Wang
  - Mario Zanot (Storyteller) – We Have a Pope
  - Stefano Marinoni and Paola Trisoglio (Visualogie), Rodolfo Migliari (Chromatica) – This Must Be the Place
  - Rainbow CGI – The Last Man on Earth
- 2013
  - Mario Zanot (Storyteller) – Diaz – Don't Clean Up This Blood
  - Raffaele Apuzzo, John Attard, Vittorio Dublino, Andrea Marotti (Rebel Alliance) – Dracula 3D
  - Paola Trisoglio and Stefano Marinoni (Visualogie) – Siberian Education
  - Bruno Albi Marini (Wonderlab) – Reality
  - Reset VFX S.r.l. – Long Live Freedom
- 2014
  - Rodolfo Migliari and Luca Della Grotta for Chromatica – The Great Beauty
  - EDI Effetti Digitali Italiani – Human Capital
  - Paola Trisoglio and Stefano Marinoni for Visualogie – The Mafia Kills Only in Summer
  - Rodolfo Migliari for Chromatica – I Can Quit Whenever I Want
  - Palantir Digital – Song'e Napule
  - Gianmario Catania and Corrado Virgili – Winx Club: The Mystery of the Abyss
- 2015
  - Visualogie – The Invisible Boy
  - Chromatica – Leopardi
  - Reset VFX – La buca
  - Reset VFX and Visualogie – The Legendary Giulia and Other Miracles
  - Rumblefish – Greenery Will Bloom Again
- 2016
  - Makinarium – Tale of Tales
  - EDI Effetti Digitali Italiani – Game Therapy
  - Chromatica – They Call Me Jeeg
  - Visualogie – Suburra
  - Peerless – Youth (Youth)
- 2017
  - Artea Film & Rain Rebel Alliance International Network – Italian Race
  - Chromatica – At War with Love
  - Makinarium – Indivisible
  - Mercurio Domina, Far Forward e Fast Forward – Mine
  - Canecane and Illusion – Ustica
- 2018
  - Mad Entertainment – Cinderella the Cat
  - Chromatica, Wonderlab and Hive Division – Addio fottuti musi verdi
  - Palantir Digital – Love and Bullets
  - Autre Chose – Ugly Nasty People
  - Frame by Frame – Monolith
- 2019
  - Víctor Pérez – The Invisible Boy: Second Generation
  - Sara Paesani and Rodolfo Migliari – Capri-Revolution
  - Rodolfo Migliari – Dogman
  - Rodolfo Migliari, Monica Galantucci – The Legend of the Christmas Witch
  - Simone Coco and James Woods – Loro
  - Giuseppe Squillaci – Michelangelo – Infinito

=== 2020s ===
- 2020
  - Rodolfo Migliari and Theo Demeris – Pinocchio
  - Giuseppe Squillaci – 5 Is the Perfect Number
  - EDI Effetti Digitali Italiani: Francesco Grisi and Gaia Bussolati – The First King: Birth of an Empire
  - Rodolfo Migliari – The Traitor
  - Luca Saviotti – Suspiria
- 2021
  - EDI Effetti Digitali Italiani: Stefano Leoni and Elisabetta Rocca – Rose Island
  - Luca Saviotti – Hammamet
  - Massimiliano Battista – Miss Marx
  - Renaud Quilichini and Lorenzo Cecotti – The Book of Vision
  - Rodolfo Migliari – Hidden Away
- 2022
  - Stefano Leoni – Freaks Out
  - Nuccio Canino – A Classic Horror Story
  - Simone Silvestri – Diabolik
  - Rodolfo Migliari – The Hand of God
  - Rodolfo Migliari and Roberto Saba – La terra dei figli
- 2023
  - Marco Geracitano – Dry
  - Alessio Bertotti and Filippo Robino – Dampyr
  - Simone Silvestri and Vito Picchinenna – Diabolik: Ginko Attacks!
  - Massimo Cipollina – Exterior Night
  - Rodolfo Migliari – The Eight Mountains
- 2024
  - Laurent Creusot and Massimo Cipollina – Io capitano
  - Stefano Leoni and Flaminia Maltese – Adagio
  - Kevin Tod Haug and Stacey Dodge – Comandante
  - Fabio Tomassetti and Daniele Tomassetti – My Summer with the Shark
  - Rodolfo Migliari and Lena Di Gennaro – Kidnapped
- 2025
  - Tristan Lilien and Michel Denis – The Great Ambition
  - Francesco Niolu and Rodolfo Migliari – The Art of Joy
  - Fabio Tomassetti and Daniele Tomassetti – Limonov: The Ballad
  - Víctor Pérez – Naples to New York
  - Rodolfo Migliari and Lena Di Gennaro – Parthenope
- 2026
  - Stefano Leoni and Andrea Lo Priore – Forbidden City
  - Gaia Bussolati and Enrico Bernocchi – The Return
  - Marco Fiorani Parenzi and Virginia Cefaly – Queer
  - Rodolfo Migliari and Lena Di Gennaro – La grazia
  - Giuseppe Squillaci and Daniele Mischianti – The Holy Boy

== See also ==
- Academy Award for Best Visual Effects
- BAFTA Award for Best Special Visual Effects
- César Award for Best Visual Effects
- European Film Award for Best Visual Effects
