= 60th David di Donatello =

2015 Italian film awards

- Date: 12 June 2015
- Site: Teatro Olimpico, Rome, Italy
- Hosted by: Tullio Solenghi

Highlights
- Best Picture: Black Souls
- Most awards: Black Souls (9)
- Most nominations: Black Souls (16)

Television coverage
- Network: Rai Movie

The 60th David di Donatello ceremony, presented by the Accademia del Cinema Italiano, was held on 12 June 2015.

== Winners and nominees ==
Best Film: Black Souls – directed by Francesco Munzi; Hungry Hearts – directed by Saverio Costanzo; Leopardi – directed by Mario Martone; Mia Madre – directed by Nanni Moretti; Greenery Will Bloom Again – directed by Ermanno Olmi	Best Producer: Cinemaundici e Babe Films, with Rai Cinema - Black Souls; Palomar, Rai Cinema - Leopardi; Nicola Giuliano, Francesca Cima, Carlotta Calori for Indigo Film, with Rai Cinema - The Invisible Boy; Carlo Cresto-Dina - Le meraviglie; Nanni Moretti for Sacher Film, Domenico Procacci per Fandango, with Rai Cinema - Mia Madre
Best Director: Francesco Munzi - Black Souls; Saverio Costanzo - Hungry Hearts; Mario Martone - Leopardi; Nanni Moretti - Mia Madre; Ermanno Olmi - Greenery Will Bloom Again	Best New Director: Edoardo Falcone - God Willing; Andrea Jublin - Banana; Lamberto Sanfelice - Chlorine; Eleonora Danco - N-Capace; Laura Bispuri - Sworn Virgin
Best Actor: Elio Germano - Leopardi; Fabrizio Ferracane - Black Souls; Alessandro Gassmann - An Italian Name; Marco Giallini - God Willing; Riccardo Scamarcio - You Can't Save Yourself Alone	Best Actress: Margherita Buy - Mia Madre; Paola Cortellesi - Do You See Me?; Virna Lisi - Latin Lover; Alba Rohrwacher - Hungry Hearts; Jasmine Trinca - You Can't Save Yourself Alone
Best Supporting Actor: Carlo Buccirosso - The Legendary Giulia and Other Miracles; Claudio Amendola - The Legendary Giulia and Other Miracles; Fabrizio Bentivoglio - The Invisible Boy; Luigi Lo Cascio - An Italian Name; Nanni Moretti - Mia Madre	Best Supporting Actress: Giulia Lazzarini - Mia Madre; Barbora Bobuľová - Black Souls; Anna Foglietta - The Legendary Giulia and Other Miracles; Valeria Golino - The Invisible Boy; Micaela Ramazzotti - An Italian Name
Best Screenplay: Francesco Munzi, Fabrizio Ruggirello, Maurizio Braucci - Black Souls; Saverio Costanzo - Hungry Hearts; Mario Martone, Ippolita Di Majo - Leopardi; Edoardo Leo, Marco Bonini - The Legendary Giulia and Other Miracles; Nanni Moretti, Francesco Piccolo, Valia Santella - Mia Madre	Best Cinematography: Vladan Radovic - Black Souls; Fabio Cianchetti - Hungry Hearts; Renato Berta - Leopardi; Italo Petriccione - The Invisible Boy; Fabio Olmi - Greenery Will Bloom Again
Best Production Design: Giancarlo Muselli - Leopardi; Luca Servino - Black Souls; Emita Frigato - Wondrous Boccaccio; Paki Meduri - The Legendary Giulia and Other Miracles; Giuseppe Pirrotta - Greenery Will Bloom Again	Best Score: Giuliano Taviani - Black Souls; Nicola Piovani - Hungry Hearts; Sascha Ring - Leopardi; Ezio Bosso, Federico De Robertis - The Invisible Boy; Paolo Fresu - Greenery Will Bloom Again
Best Original Song: "Anime nere" from Black Souls - Music and lyrics by Giuliano Taviani, performed by Massimo De Lorenzo; "Wrong skin" from The Invisible Boy - Music, lyrics and performed by Marialuna Cipolla; "Elis" from You Can't Save Yourself Alone - Music and lyrics by Arturo Annecchino, performed by Costanza Cutaia and Martina Sciucchino; "Sei mai stata sulla luna?" from Ever Been to the Moon? - Music, lyrics and performed by Francesco De Gregori -; "Bonesempio" from Take Five - Music and lyrics by Giordano Corapi and Roberta Serretiello, performed by Roberta Serretiello	Best Editing: Cristiano Travaglioli - Black Souls; Francesca Calvelli - Hungry Hearts; Jacopo Quadri - Leopardi; Massimo Fiocchi, Chiara Griziotti - Italy in a Day; Clelio Benevento - Mia Madre
Best Sound: Stefano Campus - Black Souls; Remo Ugolinelli - An Italian Name; Gilberto Martinelli - The Invisible Boy; Alessandro Zanon - Mia Madre; Francesco Liotard - Greenery Will Bloom Again	Best Costumes: Ursula Patzak - Leopardi; Marina Roberti - Black Souls; Alessandro Lai - Latin Lover; Lina Nerli Taviani - Wondrous Boccaccio; Andrea Cavalletto - Greenery Will Bloom Again
Best Digital Effects: Visualogie - The Invisible Boy; Chromatica - Leopardi; Reset VFX - La buca; Reset VFX, Visualogie - The Legendary Giulia and Other Miracles; Rumblefish - Greenery Will Bloom Again	Best Make-up Artist: Maurizio Silvi - Leopardi; Maurizio Fazzini - The Invisible Boy; Sonia Maione - Black Souls; Ermanno Spera - Latin Lover; Enrico Iacoponi - Mia Madre
Best Hairstylist: Aldo Signoretti, Alberta Giuliani - Leopardi; Rodolfo Sifari - Black Souls; Daniela Tartari - I Killed Napoléon; Alberta Giuliani - Latin Lover; Carlo Barucci - Wondrous Boccaccio	Best Documentary Feature: Belluscone: A Sicilian Story – directed by Franco Maresco; Enrico Lucherini - Ne ho fatte di tutti i colori – directed by Marco Spagnoli; Io sto con la sposa – directed by Antonio Augugliaro, Gabriele Del Grande, Khaled Soliman Al Nassiry; Quando c'era Berlinguer – directed by Walter Veltroni; Sul vulcano – directed by Gianfranco Pannone
Best Short Film: Thriller – directed by Giuseppe Marco Albano; Due piedi sinistri – directed by Isabella Salvetti; L'errore – directed by Brando De Sica; La valigia – directed by Pier Paolo Paganelli; Le note di Giulia – directed by Andrea Dalla Costa	Best European Film: The Theory of Everything – directed by James Marsh; The Broken Circle Breakdown – directed by Felix Van Groeningen; Locke – directed by Steven Knight; Pride – directed by Matthew Warchus; Wild Tales – directed by Damián Szifrón
Best Foreign Film: Birdman – directed by Alejandro González Iñárritu; American Sniper – directed by Clint Eastwood; Boyhood – directed by Richard Linklater; The Salt of the Earth – directed by Wim Wenders; Mommy – directed by Xavier Dolan	David Youth Award: The Legendary Giulia and Other Miracles – directed by Edoardo Leo; Black Souls – directed by Francesco Munzi; I nostri ragazzi – directed by Ivano De Matteo; Leopardi – directed by Mario Martone; The Invisible Boy – directed by Gabriele Salvatores
Special David Awards: Gabriele Muccino
