= The Invisible Man in popular culture =

Works of popular culture influenced by H. G. Wells' 1897 novel The Invisible Man include:

== Adaptations ==
=== Films and TV series ===
- The Invisible Man, a 1933 film directed by James Whale and produced by Universal Pictures. Griffin was played by Claude Rains and given the first name "Jack". One of the Universal horror films of the 1930s, it spawned a number of sequels, plus many spin-offs using the idea of an "invisible man" that were largely unrelated to Wells's original story and using a relative of Griffin as a secondary character possessing the invisibility formula.
  - The Invisible Man Returns (1940) with Vincent Price as Geoffrey Radcliffe, the film's invisible man;
  - The Invisible Woman (1940), a comedy with Virginia Bruce as the title character and John Barrymore as the scientist who invents the invisibility process;
  - Invisible Agent (1942), a spy film with Jon Hall as Griffin's grandson and Peter Lorre and Sir Cedric Hardwicke as Axis agents;
  - The Invisible Man's Revenge (1944) starring Jon Hall as another Invisible Man named Griffin, unrelated to any previous characters;
  - Abbott and Costello Meet Frankenstein (1948) with Vincent Price providing the voice of the Invisible Man.
  - Abbott and Costello Meet the Invisible Man (1951) with Arthur Franz as Tommy Nelson, a boxer framed for murder who takes the invisibility formula to find the real killer and clear his name;
- The Invisible Man Appears (1949), a Japanese film written and directed by Nobuo Adachi.
- The Invisible Monster (1950), a film serial.
- The Invisible Avenger (1954), a Japanese film directed by Motoyoshi Oda; based on the Wells story.
- The Invisible Man vs. The Human Fly (1957), a Japanese film directed by Mitsuo Murayama.
- The Invisible Boy (1957) starring Richard Eyer.
- Mr. X (1957), an Indian film directed by Nanabhai Bhatt and starring Ashok Kumar.
- Maya Manithan (1958), a Tamil film, directed by T P Sundaram.
- The Amazing Transparent Man, a 1960 science fiction/crime thriller about an invisible safecracker.
- Mad Monster Party? (1967) includes the Invisible Man (voiced by Allen Swift) as part of the monster ensemble.
- Sabash Satyam (1969), a Telugu film starring Krishna.
- Orloff Against the Invisible Man (also known as The Invisible Dead, Dr. Orloff's Invisible Monster, Orlaff Against The Invisible Dead, La vie amoureuse de l'homme invisible), a 1970 French film
- Amazon Women on the Moon, a 1987 comedy anthology film featuring a spoof titled Son of the Invisible Man, with Ed Begley, Jr. playing the son of the original Invisible Man who believes he is invisible, but is in fact visible – creating an awkward situation when he confidently disrobes in front of everyone.
- The Invisible Kid, a 1988 film, starring Jay Underwood and Chynna Phillips, about a teenager that accidentally discovered a formula that renders himself and his friends invisible.
- Memoirs of an Invisible Man, a 1992 film starring Chevy Chase, Daryl Hannah, Sam Neill, Michael McKean and Stephen Tobolowsky, and directed by John Carpenter. The film is loosely based on Memoirs of an Invisible Man, a 1987 novel by H.F. Saint.
- Hollow Man, a 2000 film starring Kevin Bacon, and directed by Paul Verhoeven.
  - direct-to-video sequel Hollow Man 2 starring Christian Slater as "Michael Griffin" and directed by Claudio Fah.
- Il Ragazzo Invisibile (2014), an Italian film starring Ludovico Giardello. It had a sequel in 2018.
- The Invisible Man (2020), a film written and directed by Leigh Whannell, starring Elisabeth Moss with Oliver Jackson-Cohen in the title role.
- The Invisible Woman, a film in development with Elizabeth Banks starring in the title role as well as directing and producing.

=== TV series ===
- The Invisible Man, a 1958 TV series that ran for two seasons and centred on espionage. Created by Ralph Smart.
- Mad, Mad, Mad Monsters (1972), a semi-prequel to Mad Monster Party? first shown as an episode of the Saturday morning anthology TV series The ABC Saturday Superstar Movie, also includes the Invisible Man (again voiced by Allen Swift) as part of the monster ensemble. This time, however, he was a married man named Claude (an obvious reference to Claude Rains), with an invisible wife named Nagatha (voiced by Rhoda Mann), an invisible son named Ghoul (also voiced by Swift) and even an invisible dog named Goblin.
- The Invisible Man (1975) features a sympathetic main character who uses his abilities for good. As with The Six Million Dollar Man before it, the pilot was dark in tone: Dr. Daniel Westin (David McCallum), a researcher working for the KLAE Corporation, discovers a process involving lasers that creates invisibility; after learning that the corporation plans to turn the process over to the military, he renders himself invisible and destroys the machinery. The process proves unstable and renders him permanently invisible. The regular series that followed was lighter, with Westin and his wife Kate taking on special missions for the government while trying to find a means to make him visible again.
- Gemini Man, a 1976 TV series starring Ben Murphy as agent Sam Casey who is turned invisible after being exposed to radiation following an explosion of a fallen satellite. Using a watch-like "DNA stabilizer", he is both able regain his visibility and turn himself invisible again for extremely brief periods. This series only lasted one season.
- Человек-невидимка (Pronunciation: Chelovek-nevidimka; translation: The Invisible Man), a 1977 Soviet made-for-television version directed by Gleb Selyanin and starring Rostislav Katansky as Griffin.
  - Another version with the same title was made in 1984 directed by Aleksandr Zakharov, with Andrei Kharitonov as Griffin. In this version, the plot was changed: Griffin was shown as a talented scientist but misunderstood by his contemporaries, and Kemp (Romualdas Ramanauskas) as a vicious person who wanted to become ruler of the world with Griffin's help. When Griffin rejected Kemp's proposal, the latter did all his best to kill him (and finally succeeded). The movie remained unknown to the Western audience because of a violation of Wells's copyright.
- The Invisible Woman, a 1983 TV-movie pilot for a prospective comedy series with Bob Denver.
- The Invisible Man, a 1984 television adaptation in six parts, shown on BBC 1 with Pip Donaghy as Griffin and David Gwillim as Kemp.
- A 1998 television pilot starring Kyle MacLachlan as Jack Griffin was produced but never aired.
- The Invisible Man, a Sci-Fi Channel television series that aired from 2000 to 2002. Darien Fawkes (Vincent Ventresca) is a convicted burglar who is offered freedom if he agrees to participate in a secret government project directed by his brother and funded by a secret government agency. Invisibility is achieved by implanting a synthetic gland in his brain that secretes "Quicksilver", a substance that coats his body and clothes and renders him invisible.
- The Invisible Man (2005), an animated television series produced by Moonscoop which is loosely based on the book.
- The Boys (2019), an Amazon Prime series contains a superhero named Translucent played by Alex Hassell who has the ability to turn invisible at will along with durability and super strength. He was also known to abuse his power to spy on women in bathrooms.

=== Stage ===
- Ken Hill adapted the book to play form in 1991, and it debuted at Theatre Royal Stratford East in 1991. It played in the West End in 1993 with Michael N. Harbour as Griffin. In November 2010, the play was revived at the Menier Theatre in London running until February 2011.

=== Radio ===
- The 2001 Radio Tales drama "The Invisible Man" is an adaptation of the novel for National Public Radio.
- In 2017, Big Finish Productions adapted The Invisible Man into a full-cast audio drama starring John Hurt as Griffin.

== In other media ==
- The character of the Invisible Man, given a full name of "Hawley Griffin", appears in the graphic novel The League of Extraordinary Gentlemen by Alan Moore. In the film adaptation, he is replaced with a different character named "Rodney Skinner", and instead of being the inventor of the formula, he is a thief who stole the formula. The film novelisation reveals that the inventor was Hawley Griffin. Skinner was especially created for the film because of copyright issues regarding the 1933 Universal film. Skinner is also portrayed as a more cheerful and good-natured character, and unlike Griffin, ultimately becomes the saviour rather than betrayer of the League.
- In a 1981 episode of Fantasy Island, Tattoo is tasked with taking the Invisible Man around the island.
- In 2009, Canadian cartoonist Jeff Lemire released an original graphic novel for DC Comics/Vertigo titled The Nobody. This story was inspired by The Invisible Man with "John Griffen" as "the Invisible Man".
- In the Batman: The Animated Series episode "See No Evil", Batman confronts a criminal whose experimental plastic suit renders him invisible, but also affects his sanity. In 2008, the creative team of Doug Moench and Kelley Jones created a limited series called Batman: The Unseen. It features Batman fighting against the Invisible Man.
- Castlevania often has enemies and bosses that refer to old literature and films. In Portrait of Ruin, the Invisible Man makes an appearance as an enemy that dwells in the sewers. His clothes (before he discards them to stalk players unseen) reference those in the novel The Invisible Man; he wears a long, thick, tall-collared coat, gloves and a wide-brimmed hat. He also dies in a similar fashion.
- In the book The Wright 3 by Blue Balliett, the Invisible Man played an important role in the story.
- In the one-shot comic Van Helsing: From Beneath the Rue Morgue, which presents Van Helsing and Dr. Moreau, there is a monster created by Dr. Moreau that is invisible. Van Helsing finds the papers detailing the invisibility cure and remembers something about an Englishman who turned invisible in West Sussex.
- In the 1970s, the Invisible Man appeared as a mascot in television commercials for Scotch Magic Transparent Tape.
- In the episode "X Marks the Spot" of Josie and the Pussycats (1970), the band tries to protect a professor from his invisible assistant.
- The British punk band Generation X released a song called "The Invisible Man" on their 1978 debut album Generation X.
- The British rock band Queen released a song called "The Invisible Man" as one of their singles from their 1989 album The Miracle.
- Another British rock band called Marillion also has a song called The Invisible Man. This track opens the album Marbles, released in 2004.
- In the anime series Naruto, the Second Tsuchikage, Muu, is probably based on Griffin, the main character of The Invisible Man, due to his combination of bandage-covering appearance and the invisibility technique he uses to avoid being spotted.
- In the Monster High media, including video games and web animations, there is a teacher named "Mr. Where", who dresses in the Invisible Man's bandages, trench coat, and gloves (however, he usually wears a beret and sunglasses, as he is the drama teacher). He is confirmed to be invisible beneath these coverings on more than one occasion, where his sleeves are shown bunching up to reveal his invisible limbs. He also seems to have the ability to extend his invisibility, making his clothing disappear as well.
- In the Hotel Transylvania film series, the character Invisible Man is a friend of Dracula and is one of the monsters that visit the hotel. His real name is Griffin and is voiced by David Spade.
- In Donald E. Westlake's Smoke, career thief Freddie Noon is turned invisible by an attempted cure for cancer by two smoking researchers. The book pays homage to aspects of The Invisible Man by having Noon have to struggle with exposure to the elements and having to starve himself to avoid boluses of undigested food hovering in the air.
- A web series called "The Invisible Man" based on H.G. Wells' novel premiered in 2014. The episodes were set in a modern, American context and gave the protagonist a backstory which included an estranged wife who had been the victim of domestic abuse. The series won a variety of awards at LA WebFest, Austin WebFest, DC WebFest, and more.
