= Francesca Cima =

Italian producer (born 1967 or 1968)

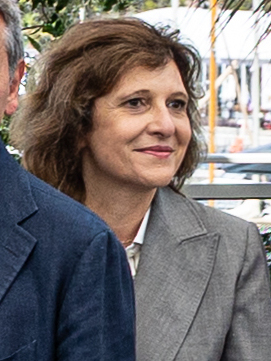
- Cima at the 2025 Cannes Film Festival
- Born: 1967 or 1968 (age 58–59); Sacile, Friuli-Venezia Giulia, Italy
- Education: Centro Sperimentale di Cinematografia
- Occupation: Producer
- Years active: 1994–present
- Children: 2

Francesca Cima (Italian pronunciation: [franˈtʃeska ˈtʃiːma]; born 1967 or 1968) is an Italian film and television producer. She co-founded the production company Indigo Film in 1994.

== Early life ==
Cima was born in Sacile, Friuli-Venezia Giulia. She has two brothers. She attended the Centro Sperimentale di Cinematografia from 1992 to 1994, graduating from the two-year production course.

== Career ==
Cima began her career working at Bianca Film. In 1994, she co-founded Indigo Film with Nicola Giuliano and Carlotta Calori, her classmates from the Centro Sperimentale di Cinematografia. In the early days of the company, she oversaw casting, editing, and post-production. She was appointed president of the producers section of the ANICA in 2014.

In 2023, she was named one of the 40 Most Influential Women in International Film by The Hollywood Reporter.

== Personal life ==
Cima is based in Rome. She has two sons with director Andrea Molaioli: Enrico and Vittorio.

== Filmography ==
=== Film ===
Year	Title	Director	Notes	Ref.
1995	Dorme	Eros Puglielli		
2001	One Man Up	Paolo Sorrentino		
2004	The Consequences of Love	Paolo Sorrentino		
2005	Mario's War	Antonio Capuano		
2005	Apnea	Roberto Dordit		
2006	The Family Friend	Paolo Sorrentino		
2007	The Girl by the Lake	Andrea Molaioli		
2007	Crossing the Line	Pietro Marcello		
2008	Il divo	Paolo Sorrentino		
2009	The Double Hour	Giuseppe Capotondi		
2009	The Mouth of the Wolf	Pietro Marcello		
2010	Afraid of the Dark (Bruises)	Massimo Coppola		
2011	The Jewel	Andrea Molaioli		
2011	This Must Be the Place	Paolo Sorrentino		
2011	Kryptonite!	Ivan Cotroneo		
2011	Ulidi piccola mia	Mateo Zoni		
2012	The Human Cargo	Daniele Vicari	Documentary film	
2013	Slow Food Story	Stefano Sardo	Documentary film	
2013	Welcome Mr. President	Riccardo Milani		
2013	The Great Beauty	Paolo Sorrentino		
2014	The Invisible Boy	Gabriele Salvatores		
2015	Youth	Paolo Sorrentino		
2015	Romeo e Giulietta	Massimo Coppola		
2015	The Wait	Piero Messina		
2015	Me, Myself and Her	Maria Sole Tognazzi		
2016	One Kiss	Ivan Cotroneo		
2016	Slam	Andrea Molaioli		
2017	Sicilian Ghost Story	Fabio Grassadonia and Antonio Piazza		
2018	The Invisible Boy: Second Generation	Gabriele Salvatores		
2018	Put Grandma in the Freezer	Giancarlo Fontana and Giuseppe G. Stasi		
2018	Euphoria	Valeria Golino	Co-producer	
2018	Capri-Revolution	Mario Martone		
2018	Loro	Paolo Sorrentino		
2019	Welcome Back Mr. President	Giancarlo Fontana and Giuseppe G. Stasi		
2019	The Bears' Famous Invasion of Sicily	Lorenzo Mattotti	Co-producer	
2019	The Mayor of Rione Sanità	Mario Martone		
2019	Il ladro di giorni	Guido Lombardi		
2020	Ultras	Francesco Lettieri		
2020	Paolo Conte, via con me	Giorgio Verdelli	Documentary film	
2020	My Heart Goes Boom!	Nacho Álvarez	Co-producer	
2020	The Binding	Domenico de Feudis		
2021	The Land of the Sons	Claudio Cupellini		
2021	The King of Laughter	Mario Martone		
2021	14 Days	Ivan Cotroneo		
2022	Princess	Roberto De Paolis		
2022	Burning Hearts	Pippo Mezzapesa		
2022	The Circle	Sophie Chiarello		
2023	The Braid	Laetitia Colombani		
2024	Another End	Piero Messina		
2024	Sicilian Letters	Fabio Grassadonia and Antonio Piazza		
2025	My Tennis Maestro	Andrea Di Stefano		
2025	A Brief Affair	Ludovica Rampoldi		
TBA	Il sopravvissuto	Claudio Cupellini		

=== Television ===
Year	Title	Network	Notes	Ref.
2013	Una mamma imperfetta	Corriere.it	1 episode	
2019	Non mentire	Canale 5	6 episodes	
2019–2021	La Compagnia del Cigno	Rai 1	13 episodes	
2021	Chiamami ancora amore	RaiPlay	6 episodes	
2022	The Gymnasts	Paramount+	6 episodes	
2022–2024	The Bad Guy	Amazon Prime Video	12 episodes	

== Awards and nominations ==
Award	Year	Category	Nominated work	Result	Ref.
British Academy Film Awards	2014	Best Film Not in the English Language	The Great Beauty	Won	
David di Donatello	2006	Best Producer	Mario's War	Nominated	
David di Donatello	2008	Best Producer	The Girl by the Lake	Won	
David di Donatello	2009	Best Film	Il divo	Nominated	
David di Donatello	2009	Best Producer	Il divo	Nominated	
David di Donatello	2012	Best Producer	This Must Be the Place	Nominated	
David di Donatello	2014	Best Film	The Great Beauty	Nominated	
David di Donatello	2014	Best Producer	The Great Beauty	Won	
David di Donatello	2015	Best Producer	The Invisible Boy	Nominated	
David di Donatello	2016	Best Producer	Youth	Nominated	
David di Donatello	2022	Best Producer	The King of Laughter	Nominated	
David di Donatello	2023	Best Producer	Princess	Nominated	
David di Donatello	2024	Best Producer	Comandante	Nominated	
European Film Awards	2008	Best Film	Il divo	Nominated	
European Film Awards	2013	Best Film	The Great Beauty	Won	
European Film Awards	2013	Best Comedy	Welcome Mr. President	Nominated	
European Film Awards	2015	Best Film	Youth	Won	
Nastri d'Argento	2007	Best Producer	Mario's War	Nominated	
Nastri d'Argento	2007	Best Producer	Apnea	Nominated	
Nastri d'Argento	2008	Best Producer	The Girl by the Lake	Nominated	
Nastri d'Argento	2009	Best Producer	Il divo	Won	
Nastri d'Argento	2012	Best Producer	This Must Be the Place	Nominated	
Nastri d'Argento	2013	Best Producer	The Great Beauty	Nominated	
Nastri d'Argento	2015	Best Producer	The Invisible Boy	Nominated	
Nastri d'Argento	2015	Best Producer	Youth	Nominated	
Nastri d'Argento	2016	Best Producer	Me, Myself and Her	Nominated	
Nastri d'Argento	2016	Best Producer	One Kiss	Nominated	
Nastri d'Argento	2017	Best Producer	Sicilian Ghost Story	Nominated	
Nastri d'Argento	2017	Best Producer	Fortunata	Nominated	
Nastri d'Argento	2018	Best Producer	The Invisible Boy: Second Generation	Nominated	
Nastri d'Argento	2022	Best Producer	The King of Laughter	Nominated	
