= David di Donatello for Best Producer =

Italian film award

David di Donatello Award for Best Producer
- Country: Italy
- Presented by: Accademia del Cinema Italiano
- First award: 1956 (for producing in films released during the 1955/1956 film season)
- Website: daviddidonatello.it

The David di Donatello Award for Best Producer (Italian: David di Donatello per il miglior produttore) is a film award presented annually by the Accademia del Cinema Italiano (ACI, Academy of Italian Cinema) to recognize outstanding production efforts by producers or production companies who have worked within the Italian film industry during the year preceding the ceremony.

The award was first given in 1956 and became competitive in 1981.

== Winners and nominees ==
Below, winners are listed first in the colored row, followed by other nominees.

=== 1950s ===
Year	Producer(s)	Film	Ref.
1955/56 (1st)
1955/56 (1st)	Goffredo Lombardo	Scandal in Sorrento	
1955/56 (1st)	Angelo Rizzoli	The Grand Maneuver	
1955/56 (1st)	Nicolò Theodoli	Roman Tales	
1956/57 (2nd)
1956/57 (2nd)	Dino De Laurentiis	Nights of Cabiria	
1956/57 (2nd)	Renato Gualino	L'impero del sole	
1957/58 (3rd)
1957/58 (3rd)	Leonardo Bonzi	La muraglia cinese	
1957/58 (3rd)	Milko Skofic	Anna of Brooklyn	
1958/59 (4th)
1958/59 (4th)	Dino De Laurentiis	Tempest	
1958/59 (4th)	Titanus	The Naked Maja	

=== 1960s ===
Year	Producer(s)	Film	Ref.
1959/60 (5th)
1959/60 (5th)	Dino De Laurentiis	The Great War	
1959/60 (5th)	Zebra Film	General Della Rovere	
1960/61 (6th)
1960/61 (6th)	Dino De Laurentiis	Everybody Go Home	
1960/61 (6th)	Goffredo Lombardo	Rocco and His Brothers	
1961/62 (7th)
1961/62 (7th)	Dino De Laurentiis	A Difficult Life	
1961/62 (7th)	Angelo Rizzoli	Mondo Cane	
1962/63 (8th)
1962/63 (8th)	Gaumont, Trianon Films, and Ultra Film	Two Are Guilty	
1962/63 (8th)	Goffredo Lombardo	The Leopard	
1963/64 (9th)
1963/64 (9th)	Franco Cristaldi	Seduced and Abandoned	
1963/64 (9th)	Carlo Ponti	Yesterday, Today and Tomorrow	
1964/65 (10th)
1964/65 (10th)	Carlo Ponti	Marriage Italian-Style	
1965/66 (11th)
1965/66 (11th)	Dino De Laurentiis	The Bible: In the Beginning...	
1965/66 (11th)	Robert Haggiag and Pietro Germi	The Birds, the Bees and the Italians	
1965/66 (11th)	Rizzoli Film	Africa Addio	
1966/67 (12th)
1966/67 (12th)	Mario Cecchi Gori	The Tiger and the Pussycat	
1966/67 (12th)	FAI - Films Artistici Internazionali	The Taming of the Shrew	
1967/68 (13th)
1967/68 (13th)	Luigi Carpentieri and Ermanno Donati	The Day of the Owl	
1967/68 (13th)	Dino De Laurentiis	Bandits in Milan	
1968/69 (14th)
1968/69 (14th)	Bino Cicogna	Once Upon a Time in the West	
1968/69 (14th)	Gianni Hecht Lucari	The Girl with the Pistol	

=== 1970s ===
Year	Producer(s)	Film	Ref.
1969/70 (15th)
1970/71 (16th)
1971/72 (17th)
1972/73 (18th)
1973/74 (19th)
1974/75 (20th)
1975/76 (21st)
1976/77 (22nd)
1977/78 (23rd)
1977/78 (23rd)	Franco Committeri	In the Name of the Pope King	
1978/79 (24th)

=== 1980s ===
Year	Producer(s)	Film	Ref.
1979/80 (25th)
1979/80 (25th)	Mario Cecchi Gori	Velvet Hands	
1979/80 (25th)	Joseph Losey	Don Giovanni	
1980/81 (26th)
1980/81 (26th)	Franco Committeri	Passion of Love	
1980/81 (26th)	Fulvio Lucisano and Mauro Berardi	I'm Starting from Three	
1980/81 (26th)	Gianni Minervini and Antonio Avati	Help Me Dream	
1981/82 (27th)
1981/82 (27th)	Antonio Avati and Gianni Minervini	Off Season	
1981/82 (27th)	Silvio Clementelli and Anna Maria Clementelli	Sweet Pea	
1981/82 (27th)	Giovanni De Feo, Gaumont, and Opera Film Produzione	Il Marchese del Grillo	
1982/83 (28th)
1982/83 (28th)	Giuliani G. De Negri	The Night of the Shooting Stars	
1982/83 (28th)	Carlo Cucchi and Silvia D'Amico Bendicò	State buoni se potete	
1982/83 (28th)	Renzo Rossellini	That Night in Varennes	
1983/84 (29th)
1983/84 (29th)	Gianni Minervini	Where's Picone?	
1983/84 (29th)	Franco Cristaldi	And the Ship Sails On	
1983/84 (29th)	Mohammed Lakhdar-Hamina and Giorgio Silvagni	Le Bal	
1984/85 (30th)
1984/85 (30th)	Giuliani G. De Negri	Kaos	
1984/85 (30th)	Fulvio Lucisano	A Proper Scandal	
1984/85 (30th)	Gaumont	Carmen	
1985/86 (31st)
1985/86 (31st)	Giovanni Di Clemente	Let's Hope It's a Girl	
1985/86 (31st)	Alberto Grimaldi	Ginger and Fred	
1985/86 (31st)	Achille Manzotti	The Mass Is Ended	
1986/87 (32nd)
1986/87 (32nd)	Franco Cristaldi and Bernd Eichinger	The Name of the Rose	
1986/87 (32nd)	Antonio Avati	Christmas Present	
1986/87 (32nd)	Franco Committeri	The Family	
1987/88 (33rd)
1987/88 (33rd)	Franco Giovalé, Joyce Herlihy, and Jeremy Thomas	The Last Emperor	
1987/88 (33rd)	Angelo Barbagallo and Nanni Moretti	Italian Night	
1987/88 (33rd)	Carlo Cucchi and Silvia D'Amico Bendicò	Dark Eyes	
1988/89 (34th)
1988/89 (34th)	Filiberto Bandini	Dear Gorbachev	
1988/89 (34th)	Claudio Bonivento	Forever Mery	
1988/89 (34th)	Franco Cristaldi	Cinema Paradiso	

=== 1990s ===
Year	Producer(s)	Film	Ref.
1989/90 (35th)
1989/90 (35th)	Mario Cecchi Gori, Vittorio Cecchi Gori and Gianni Minervini	On Tour	
1989/90 (35th)	Angelo Barbagallo and Nanni Moretti	Red Wood Pigeon	
1989/90 (35th)	Mario Cecchi Gori and Vittorio Cecchi Gori	The Voice of the Moon	
1989/90 (35th)	Giovanni Di Clemente	Street Kids	
1989/90 (35th)	Mario Orfini	The Bachelor	
1989/90 (35th)	Angelo Rizzoli Jr.	Open Doors	
1990/91 (36th)
1990/91 (36th)	Claudio Bonivento	Boys on the Outside	
1990/91 (36th)	Claudio Bonivento	Ultrà	
1990/91 (36th)	Mario Cecchi Gori, Vittorio Cecchi Gori and Gianni Minervini	Mediterraneo	
1990/91 (36th)	Nanni Moretti and Angelo Barbagallo	The Yes Man	
1990/91 (36th)	Domenico Procacci	The Station	
1991/92 (37th)
1991/92 (37th)	Angelo Rizzoli	The Stolen Children	
1991/92 (37th)	Claudio Bonivento	The Inner Circle	
1991/92 (37th)	Giovanni Di Clemente	Parenti serpenti	
1992/93 (38th)
1992/93 (38th)	Claudio Bonivento	The Escort	
1992/93 (38th)	Guido De Laurentiis, Fulvio Lucisano and Leo Pescarolo	The Great Pumpkin	
1992/93 (38th)	Elda Ferri	Jonah Who Lived in the Whale	
1993/94 (39th)
1993/94 (39th)	Aurelio De Laurentiis	For Love, Only for Love	
1993/94 (39th)	Angelo Barbagallo and Nanni Moretti	Caro diario	
1993/94 (39th)	Giovanni Di Clemente	Giovanni Falcone	
1994/95 (40th)
1994/95 (40th)	Pietro Valsecchi	Un eroe borghese	
1994/95 (40th)	Angelo Curti, Andrea Occhipinti and Kermit Smith	Nasty Love	
1994/95 (40th)	Elda Ferri	Sostiene Pereira	
1994/95 (40th)	Marco Poccioni and Marco Valsania	No Skin	
1995/96 (41st)
1995/96 (41st)	Pietro Innocenzi and Roberto Di Girolamo	Palermo - Milan One Way	
1995/96 (41st)	Angelo Barbagallo and Nanni Moretti	The Second Time	
1995/96 (41st)	Amedeo Pagani	Ulysses' Gaze	
1996/97 (42nd)
1996/97 (42nd)	Leo Pescarolo and Guido De Laurentiis	The Truce	
1996/97 (42nd)	Vittorio Cecchi Gori, Rita Cecchi Gori and Maurizio Totti	Nirvana	
1996/97 (42nd)	Giovanni Di Clemente	The Game Bag	
1996/97 (42nd)	Laurentina Guidotti and Francesco Ranieri Martinotti	Growing Artichokes in Mimongo	
1996/97 (42nd)	Pietro Valsecchi	An Eyewitness Account	
1997/98 (43rd)
1997/98 (43rd)	Elda Ferri and Gianluigi Braschi	Life is Beautiful	
1997/98 (43rd)	Donatella Palermo and Loes Kamsteeg	To Die for Tano	
1997/98 (43rd)	Marco Risi and Maurizio Tedesco	Kaputt Mundi	
1998/99 (44th)
1998/99 (44th)	Lionello Cerri	Fuori dal mondo	
1998/99 (44th)	Franco Committeri	The Dinner	
1998/99 (44th)	Domenico Procacci	Radiofreccia	

=== 2000s ===
Year	Producer(s)	Film	Ref.
1999/00 (45th)
1999/00 (45th)	Amedeo Pagani	Olympic Garage	
1999/00 (45th)	Vittorio Cecchi Gori	Canone inverso	
1999/00 (45th)	Domenico Procacci	But Forever in My Mind	
2000/01 (46th)
2000/01 (46th)	Domenico Procacci	The Last Kiss	
2000/01 (46th)	Angelo Barbagallo and Nanni Moretti	The Son's Room	
2000/01 (46th)	Fabrizio Mosca	One Hundred Steps	
2001/02 (47th)
2001/02 (47th)	Luigi Musini, Roberto Cicuta and Ermanno Olmi	The Profession of Arms	
2001/02 (47th)	Roberto Buttafarro, Mikado and Rai Cinema	Santa Maradona	
2001/02 (47th)	Lionello Cerri, Luigi Musini, Rai Cinema, and Vega Film	Burning in the Wind	
2002/03 (48th)
2002/03 (48th)	Domenico Procacci	Respiro	
2002/03 (48th)	Elda Ferri	The Soul Keeper	
2002/03 (48th)	Domenico Procacci	The Embalmer	
2002/03 (48th)	Domenico Procacci	Remember Me, My Love	
2002/03 (48th)	Gianni Romoli and Tilde Corsi	Facing Windows	
2003/04 (49th)
2003/04 (49th)	Angelo Barbagallo	The Best of Youth	
2003/04 (49th)	Aurelio De Laurentiis	What Will Happen to Us	
2003/04 (49th)	Luigi Musini and Roberto Cicutto	Singing Behind Screens	
2003/04 (49th)	Domenico Procacci	First Love	
2003/04 (49th)	Riccardo Tozzi, Giovanni Stabilini, Marco Chimenz, and Medusa Film	Don't Move	
2004/05 (50th)
2004/05 (50th)	Rosario Rinaldo	A Children's Story	
2004/05 (50th)	Aurelio De Laurentiis	Manual of Love	
2004/05 (50th)	Davide Ferrario	After Midnight	
2004/05 (50th)	Elda Ferri	Come into the Light	
2004/05 (50th)	Domenico Procacci, and Nicola Giuliano	The Consequences of Love	
2005/06 (51st)
2005/06 (51st)	Angelo Barbagallo, Nanni Moretti, and Sacher Film	The Caiman	
2005/06 (51st)	Aurelio De Laurentiis	My Best Enemy	
2005/06 (51st)	Fulvio Lucisano, Federica Lucisano, and Gianandrea Pecorelli	Notte prima degli esami	
2005/06 (51st)	Domenico Procacci, Nicola Giuliano, and Francesca Cima	Mario's War	
2005/06 (51st)	Riccardo Tozzi, Giovanni Stabilini, and Marco Chimenz	Romanzo Criminale	
2006/07 (52nd)
2006/07 (52nd)	Donatella Botti and Rai Cinema	Salty Air	
2006/07 (52nd)	Cattleya	My Brother Is an Only Child	
2006/07 (52nd)	Medusa Film	The Unknown Woman	
2006/07 (52nd)	Fabrizio Mosca	Nuovomondo	
2006/07 (52nd)	Luigi Musini, Roberto Cicutto, and Rai Cinema	One Hundred Nails	
2007/08 (53rd)
2007/08 (53rd)	Nicola Giuliano and Francesca Cima	The Girl by the Lake	
2007/08 (53rd)	Simone Bachini, Mario Chemello, and Giorgio Diritti	The Wind Blows Round	
2007/08 (53rd)	Lionello Cerri	Days and Clouds	
2007/08 (53rd)	Andrea Occhipinti and Gianluca Arcopinto	Sonetàula	
2007/08 (53rd)	Domenico Procacci	Quiet Chaos	
2008/09 (54th)
2008/09 (54th)	Domenico Procacci	Gomorrah	
2008/09 (54th)	Augusto Allegra, Isabella Cocuzza, Giuliana Gamba, and Arturo Paglia	Cover Boy	
2008/09 (54th)	Matteo Garrone	Pranzo di ferragosto	
2008/09 (54th)	Andrea Occhipinti, Nicola Giuliano, Francesca Cima, and Maurizio Coppolecchia	Il Divo	
2008/09 (54th)	Angelo Rizzoli	We Can Do That	

=== 2010s ===
Year	Producer(s)	Film	Ref.
2009/10 (55th)
2009/10 (55th)	Simone Bachini, Giorgio Diritti, and Rai Cinema	The Man Who Will Come	
2009/10 (55th)	Angelo Barbagallo, Rai Cinema, and Gianluca Curti	Fort Apache Napoli	
2009/10 (55th)	Mario Gianani	Vincere	
2009/10 (55th)	Medusa Film	Baarìa	
2009/10 (55th)	Domenico Procacci	Loose Cannons	
2010/11 (56th)
2010/11 (56th)	Tilde Corsi, Gianni Romoli, and Claudio Bonivento	20 Cigarettes	
2010/11 (56th)	Angelo Barbagallo	The Salt of Life	
2010/11 (56th)	Isabella Cocuzza, Arturo Paglia, Mark Lombardo, and Elisabetta Olmi	Basilicata Coast to Coast	
2010/11 (56th)	Carlo Degli Esposti, Conchita Airoldi and Giorgio Magliulo	Noi credevamo	
2010/11 (56th)	Gregorio Paonessa, Marta Donzelli, Susanne Marian, Philippe Bober, Gabriella Manfrè, Elda Guidinetti, and Andres Pfaeffli	The Solitude of Prime Numbers	
2011/12 (57th)
2011/12 (57th)	Grazia Volpi	Caesar Must Die	
2011/12 (57th)	Francesco Bonsembiante	Shun Li and the Poet	
2011/12 (57th)	Nicola Giuliano, Andrea Occhipinti, Francesca Cima, and Medusa Film	This Must Be the Place	
2011/12 (57th)	Nanni Moretti and Domenico Procacci	We Have a Pope	
2011/12 (57th)	Riccardo Tozzi, Giovanni Stabilini, and Marco Chimenz	Piazza Fontana: The Italian Conspiracy	
2012/13 (58th)
2012/13 (58th)	Domenico Procacci	Diaz - Don't Clean Up This Blood	
2012/13 (58th)	Antonio Barbagallo	Long Live Freedom	
2012/13 (58th)	Isabella Cocuzza and Arturo Paglia	The Best Offer	
2012/13 (58th)	Fabrizio Mosca	Alì ha gli occhi azzurri	
2012/13 (58th)	Riccardo Tozzi, Giovanni Stabilini and Marco Chimenz	Siberian Education	
2013/14 (59th)
2013/14 (59th)	Nicola Giuliano and Francesca Cima	The Great Beauty	
2013/14 (59th)	Massimo Cristalli and Fabrizio Mosca	Salvo	
2013/14 (59th)	Fabrizio Donvito, Benedetto Habib, and Marco Cohen	Human Capital	
2013/14 (59th)	Mario Gianani and Lorenzo Mieli	The Mafia Kills Only in Summer	
2013/14 (59th)	Domenico Procacci and Matteo Rovere	I Can Quit Whenever I Want	
2013/14 (59th)	Riccardo Scamarcio and Viola Prestieri	Miele	
2014/15 (60th)
2014/15 (60th)	Cinemaundici and Babe Films	Black Souls	
2014/15 (60th)	Carlo Cresto-Dina	The Wonders	
2014/15 (60th)	Nicola Giuliano, Francesca Cima, and Carlotta Calori	The Invisible Boy	
2014/15 (60th)	Nanni Moretti and Domenico Procacci	Mia Madre	
2014/15 (60th)	Palomar and Rai Cinema	Leopardi	
2015/16 (61st)
2015/16 (61st)	Gabriele Mainetti	They Call Me Jeeg	
2015/16 (61st)	21uno Film, Stemal Entertainment, Istituto Luce Cinecittà, Rai Cinema, and Les Films d'Ici	Fire at Sea	
2015/16 (61st)	Archimede and Rai Cinema	Tale of Tales	
2015/16 (61st)	Paolo Bogna, Simone Isola and Valerio Mastandrea	Don't Be Bad	
2015/16 (61st)	Nicola Giuliano, Francesca Cima and Carlotta Calori	Youth	
2016 (62nd)
2016 (62nd)	Attilio De Razza and Pierpaolo Verga	Indivisible	
2016 (62nd)	Andrea Barbagallo	The Confessions	
2016 (62nd)	Marco Belardi	Like Crazy	
2016 (62nd)	Cristiano Bortone, Bart Van Langendonck, Peter Bouckaert, Gong Ming Cai, and Natacha Devillers	Coffee	
2016 (62nd)	Domenico Procacci	Italian Race	
2016 (62nd)	Rita Rognoni and IBC Movie	Fiore	
2017 (63rd)
2017 (63rd)	Luciano Stella and Maria Carolina Terzi	Cinderella the Cat	
2017 (63rd)	Marta Donzelli, Gregorio Paonessa, Joseph Rouschop and Valérie Bournonville	Nico, 1988	
2017 (63rd)	Carlo Macchitella and Manetti Bros.	Love and Bullets	
2017 (63rd)	Domenico Procacci and Matteo Rovere	Smetto quando voglio - Masterclass	
2017 (63rd)	Domenico Procacci and Matteo Rovere	Smetto quando voglio - Ad honorem	
2017 (63rd)	Stayblack Productions, Jon Copolon, Paolo Carpignano, and Rai Cinema	A Ciambra	
2018 (64th)
2018 (64th)	Cinemaundici and Lucky Red	On My Skin	
2018 (64th)	Archimede, Rai Cinema, and Le Pacte	Dogman	
2018 (64th)	Carlo Cresto-Dina and Rai Cinema	Happy as Lazzaro	
2018 (64th)	Howard Rosenman, Peter Spears, Luca Guadagnino, Emilie Georges, Rodrigo Teixeira, Marco Morabito, and James Ivory	Call Me By Your Name	
2018 (64th)	Agostino Saccà, Maria Grazia Saccà, Giuseppe Saccà, and Rai Cinema	Boys Cry	
2019 (65th)
2019 (65th)	Groenlandia, Gapbusters, Rai Cinema, Roman Citizen	The First King: Birth of an Empire	
2019 (65th)	Domenico Procacci, Anna Maria Morelli (TIMvision)	Bangla	
2019 (65th)	IBC Movie, Kavac Film, Rai Cinema	The Traitor	
2019 (65th)	Pietro Marcello, Beppe Caschetto, Thomas Ordonneau, Michael Weber, Viola Fügen, Rai Cinema	Martin Eden	
2019 (65th)	Archimede, Rai Cinema, Le Pacte	Pinocchio	

=== 2020s ===
Year	Producer(s)	Film	Ref.
2020 (66th)
2020 (66th)	Marta Donzelli, Gregorio Paonessa, Joseph Rouschop and Valérie Bournonville, Vivo Film, Rai Cinema and Tarantula Belgique	Miss Marx	
2020 (66th)	Agostino Sacca, Giuseppe Sacca	Bad Tales	
2020 (66th)	Carlo Degli Esposti and Nicola Serra	Hidden Away	
2020 (66th)	Domenico Procacci, Laura Paolucci	The Predators	
2020 (66th)	Matteo Rovere	Rose Island	
2021 (67th)
2021 (67th)	Andrea Occhipinti, Stefano Massenzi, Mattia Guerra, Gabriele Mainetti and Isabella Orsini	Freaks Out	
2021 (67th)	Jon Coplon, Ryan Zacarias, Paolo Carpignano and Jonas Carpignano	A Chiara	
2021 (67th)	Carlo Cresto-Dina and Michela Pini	The Inner Cage	
2021 (67th)	Paolo Sorrentino and Lorenzo Mieli	The Hand of God	
2021 (67th)	Nicola Giuliano, Francesca Cima and Carlotta Calori	The King of Laughter	
2022 (68th)
2022 (68th)	Angelo Barbagallo and Attilio De Razza	Strangeness	
2022 (68th)	Lorenzo Mieli and Simone Gattoni	Exterior Night	
2022 (68th)	Wildside, Rufus, Menuetto, Pyramide Productions, Vision Distribution and Elastic	The Eight Mountains	
2022 (68th)	Maria Carolina Terzi, Luciano Stella, Carlo Stella, Roberto Sessa and Angelo Laudisa	Nostalgia	
2022 (68th)	Carla Altieri, Roberto De Paolis, Nicola Giuliano, Francesca Cima, Carlotta Calori and Viola Prestieri	Princess	
2023 (69th)
2023 (69th)	Archimede, Rai Cinema, Pathé, and Tarantula	Io capitano	
2023 (69th)	Carlo Cresto-Dina and Paolo Del Brocco	La chimera	
2023 (69th)	Nicola Giuliano, Francesca Cima, Carlotta Calori, Viola Prestieri, Pierpaolo Verga, Edoardo De Angelis, Paolo Del Brocco, Attilio De Razza, Mariagiovanna De Angelis, and Antonio Miyakaw	Comandante	
2023 (69th)	Giulia Achilli, Marco Alessi, Lionel Massol, Pauline Seigland, and André Logie	Disco Boy	
2023 (69th)	Mario Gianani and Lorenzo Gangarossa	There's Still Tomorrow	
2024 (70th)
2024 (70th)	Francesca Andreoli, Leonardo Guerra Seràgnoli, Santiago Fondevila Sancet, and Maura Delpero	Vermiglio	
2024 (70th)	Giovanna Crispino, Gianluca Curti, Walter De Majo, Antonella De Martino, Gaetano Di Vaio, Alessandro Elia, Andrea Leone, and Santo Versace	Ciao bambino	
2024 (70th)	Carlo Cresto-Dina, Valeria Jamonte, Manuela Melissano, and Katrin Renz	Gloria!	
2024 (70th)	Francesco Bonsembiante, Martichka Bozhilova, Marta Donzelli, Gregorio Paonessa, and Joseph Rouschop	The Great Ambition	
2024 (70th)	Lorenzo Cioffi, Giorgio Giampà, Nanni Moretti, and Alessandra Stefani	Vittoria	
2025 (71st)
2025 (71st)	Marta Donzelli, Gregorio Paonessa (Vivo Film) in collaboration with Philipp Kreuzer (Maze Pictures), Cecilia Trautvetter	The Last One for the Road	
2025 (71st)	Lionello Cerri, Cristiana Mainardi (Lumière & Co.); in collaboration with Joseph Rouschop (Tarantula); Katrin Renz, Stefan Jäger (Tellfilm)	The Tasters	
2025 (71st)	Carlo Degli Esposti, Nicola Serra, Marco Grifoni (Palomar), Benedetta Cappon (Avventurosa) in collaboration with Alexandra Henochsberg, Pierre-François Piet (Ad Vitam Films)	Duse	
2025 (71st)	Benedetta Scagnelli, Alessio Pasqua, Gianluca Arcopinto, Claudio Cofrancesco (Yagi Media); in collaboration with Paolo Butini, Ivan Caso, Filippo Barracco	Sweetheart	
2025 (71st)	Andrea Occhipinti (Lucky Red), Marco Alessi (Dugong Films); in collaboration with Beatrice Bulgari (Eolo Film Productions)	Bravo Bene!	

== See also ==
- Nastro d'Argento for Best Producer
- Cinema of Italy
