= Nicola Giuliano =

Italian film producer (born 1966)

- Born: 1 February 1966 (age 60); Naples, Italy
- Education: University of Naples Federico II; Centro Sperimentale di Cinematografia
- Occupation: Producer
- Spouse: Ludovica Rampoldi
- Children: 1

Nicola Giuliano (Italian pronunciation: [niˈkɔːla dʒuˈljaːno]; born 1 February 1966) is an Italian film and television producer. He co-founded the production company Indigo Film in 1994.

== Biography ==
Giuliano was born in Vomero, Naples, and attended the Liceo Sannazaro. He graduated with a degree in jurisprudence from the University of Naples Federico II before attending the Centro Sperimentale di Cinematografia.

He co-founded Indigo Film with Francesca Cima and Carlotta Calori in 1994. With Cima, he co-produced the 2013 film The Great Beauty, which won the Academy Award for Best International Feature Film at the 86th Academy Awards.

He is married to screenwriter Ludovica Rampoldi. They have one daughter.

== Filmography ==
=== Film ===
- Dorme (1995)
- L'amore non ha confini (1998; short film)
- Prima del tramonto (1999)
- One Man Up (2001)
- Pesci combattenti (2002)
- La volpe a tre zampe (2004)
- The Consequences of Love (2004)
- Apnea (2005)
- Mario's War (2005)
- The Family Friend (2006)
- The Girl by the Lake (2007)
- Il passaggio della linea (2007)
- Il divo (2008)
- The Double Hour (2009)
- The Mouth of the Wolf (2009)
- Hai paura del buio (2010)
- Napoli 24 (2010)
- The Jewel (2011)
- This Must Be the Place (2011)
- Kryptonite! (2011)
- Questa storia qua (2011)
- La nave dolce (2012)
- Welcome Mr. President (2013)
- The Great Beauty (2013)
- Il Natale della mamma imperfetta (2013)
- The Invisible Boy (2014)
- Youth (2015)
- The Wait (2015)
- Me, Myself and Her (2015)
- Slam (2016)
- Fortunata (2017)
- Sicilian Ghost Story (2017)
- The Invisible Boy: Second Generation (2018)
- Un figlio a tutti i costi (2018)
- Put Grandma in the Freezer (2018)
- Loro (2018)
- Capri-Revolution (2018)
- The Man Who Bought the Moon (2018)
- The Mayor of Rione Sanità (2019)
- The Players (2020)
- The King of Laughter (2021)
- Lovely Boy (2021)
- Princess (2022)
- The Braid (2023)
- Comandante (2023)
- Another End (2024)
- Sicilian Letters (2024)
- Familia (2024)

=== Television ===
- Una mamma imperfetta (2013)
- Non mentire (2019)
- The Bad Guy (2022–present)

== Awards and nominations ==
Award	Year	Category	Work	Result	Ref.
David di Donatello	2005	Best Producer	The Consequences of Love	Nominated	
David di Donatello	2006	Best Producer	Mario's War	Nominated	
David di Donatello	2008	Best Producer	The Girl by the Lake	Won	
David di Donatello	2009	Best Producer	Il Divo	Nominated	
David di Donatello	2012	Best Producer	This Must Be the Place	Nominated	
David di Donatello	2014	Best Producer	The Great Beauty	Won	
David di Donatello	2015	Best Producer	The Invisible Boy	Nominated	
David di Donatello	2016	Best Producer	Youth	Nominated	
David di Donatello	2022	Best Producer	The King of Laughter	Nominated	
David di Donatello	2023	Best Producer	Princess	Nominated	
David di Donatello	2024	Best Producer	Comandante	Nominated	
Nastro d'Argento	2007	Best Producer	Apnea	Nominated	
Nastro d'Argento	2007	Best Producer	Mario's War	Nominated	
Nastro d'Argento	2008	Best Producer	The Girl by the Lake	Nominated	
Nastro d'Argento	2009	Best Producer	Il Divo	Won	
Nastro d'Argento	2012	Best Producer	This Must Be the Place	Nominated	
Nastro d'Argento	2013	Best Producer	The Great Beauty	Nominated	
Nastro d'Argento	2015	Best Producer	The Invisible Boy	Nominated	
Nastro d'Argento	2015	Best Producer	Youth	Nominated	
Nastro d'Argento	2016	Best Producer	Me, Myself and Her	Nominated	
Nastro d'Argento	2016	Best Producer	One Kiss	Nominated	
Nastro d'Argento	2017	Best Producer	Sicilian Ghost Story	Nominated	
Nastro d'Argento	2017	Best Producer	Fortunata	Nominated	
Nastro d'Argento	2018	Best Producer	Loro	Nominated	
Nastro d'Argento	2018	Best Producer	The Invisible Boy: Second Generation	Nominated	
Nastro d'Argento	2022	Best Producer	The King of Laughter	Nominated	
