= My Tennis Maestro =

2025 film by Andrea Di Stefano

- Promotional poster
- Italian: Il maestro
- Directed by: Andrea Di Stefano
- Written by: Andrea Di Stefano; Ludovica Rampoldi
- Produced by: Nicola Giuliano; Francesca Cima; Carlotta Calori; Viola Prestieri; Marco Cohen; Benedetto Habib; Fabrizio Donvito; Daniel Campos Pavoncelli
- Starring: Pierfrancesco Favino; Tiziano Menichelli; Giovanni Ludeno; Dora Romano
- Cinematography: Matteo Cocco
- Edited by: Giogiò Franchini
- Music by: Bartosz Szpak
- Production companies: Indiana Production; Indigo Film; Vision Distribution
- Distributed by: Vision Distribution
- Release dates: 31 August 2025 (Venice); 13 November 2025 (Italy)
- Running time: 125 minutes
- Country: Italy
- Language: Italian

My Tennis Maestro (Italian: Il maestro, lit. 'The master') is a 2025 Italian sports drama film directed by Andrea Di Stefano and starring Pierfrancesco Favino. The film had its world premiere out of competition at the 82nd Venice International Film Festival on 31 August 2025. It received a theatrical release in Italy on 13 November 2025.

== Cast ==
- Pierfrancesco Favino as Raul Gatti
- Tiziano Menichelli as Felice
- Giovanni Ludeno
- Dora Romano
- Paolo Briguglia
- Valentina Bellè
- Edwige Fenech
- Chiara Bassermann
- Roberto Zibetti
- Fabrizio Careddu
- Carlo Gallo

== Production ==
Director Andrea Di Stefano, who played tennis in his youth, co-wrote the screenplay with Ludovica Rampoldi, with its first draft dating back to 2005. Di Stefano had previously worked with actor Pierfrancesco Favino on his 2023 film, Last Night of Amore. The production is a collaboration between Indiana Production, Indigo Film, and Vision Distribution.

Principal photography began in late 2024. Filming took place in Rome, Gaeta, Portonovo, San Benedetto del Tronto, and Grottammare.

== Release ==
Playtime owns the international sales rights to the film. The film had its world premiere out of competition at the 82nd Venice International Film Festival on 31 August 2025. It received a theatrical release in Italy on 13 November 2025.

== Critical response ==
Giorgia Del Don of Cineuropa highlighted the performances of Pierfrancesco Favino and Tiziano Menichelli, noting the chemistry between the lead characters and the "extreme attention to details" for the depiction of 1980s Italy as strengths of the film. Peter Bradshaw of The Guardian noted that, while Pierfrancesco Favino delivers a compelling lead performance, the film falters in its final act, unable to settle between underdog triumph and a critique of win-at-all-costs culture, leaving unresolved emotional arcs and an unsatisfying conclusion.
