= The Great Beauty =

2013 film by Paolo Sorrentino

- Italian theatrical release poster
- Italian: La grande bellezza
- Directed by: Paolo Sorrentino
- Screenplay by: Paolo Sorrentino; Umberto Contarello
- Story by: Paolo Sorrentino
- Produced by: Nicola Giuliano; Francesca Cima
- Starring: Toni Servillo; Carlo Verdone; Sabrina Ferilli; Carlo Buccirosso; Iaia Forte; Pamela Villoresi; Galatea Ranzi; Franco Graziosi; Giorgio Pasotti; Massimo Popolizio; Sonia Gessner; Anna Della Rosa; Luca Marinelli; Serena Grandi; Ivan Franek; Vernon Dobtcheff; Dario Cantarelli; Lillo Petrolo; Luciano Virgilio; Giusi Merli; Anita Kravos; Massimo De Francovich; Roberto Herlitzka; Isabella Ferrari
- Cinematography: Luca Bigazzi
- Edited by: Cristiano Travaglioli
- Music by: Lele Marchitelli
- Production companies: Indigo Film; Babe Films; Pathé; Medusa Film; France 2 Cinéma
- Distributed by: Medusa Film (Italy); Pathé Distribution (France)
- Release dates: 21 May 2013 (Cannes); 21 May 2013 (Italy); 22 May 2013 (France)
- Running time: 142 minutes; 173 minutes (director's cut)
- Countries: Italy; France
- Language: Italian
- Budget: €9.2 million
- Box office: $29.4 million

The Great Beauty (Italian: La grande bellezza) is a 2013 art drama film co-written and directed by Paolo Sorrentino. Filming took place in Rome starting on 9 August 2012. It premiered at the 2013 Cannes Film Festival where it was screened in competition for the Palme d'Or. It was shown at the 2013 Toronto International Film Festival, the 2013 Tallinn Black Nights Film Festival (winning Grand Prix), and at the 2013 Reykjavik European Film Festival.

The film won Best Foreign Language Film at the 86th Academy Awards, as well as the Golden Globe and the BAFTA award in the same category. It is a co-production between the Italian Medusa Film and Indigo Film and the French Babe Films, with support from Banca Popolare di Vicenza, Pathé and France 2 Cinéma. With a production budget of €9.2 million, the film grossed over $24 million worldwide.

== Plot ==
The film opens with a quote from Louis-Ferdinand Céline's novel Journey to the End of the Night: "Travel is useful; it exercises the imagination. All the rest is disappointment and fatigue. Our journey is entirely imaginary. That is its strength. It goes from life to death. People, animals, cities, things – all are imagined. It's a novel, just a fictitious narrative. Littré says so, and he's never wrong. And besides, in the first place, anyone can do as much. You just have to close your eyes. It's on the other side of life."

Jep Gambardella is a 65-year-old seasoned journalist and theater critic, mostly committed to wandering among the social events of a Rome immersed in the beauty of its history and in the superficiality of its inhabitants today, in a merciless contrast. He also ventured into creative writing in his youth: he is the author of only one work called The Human Apparatus. Despite the appreciation and the many awards he received, Jep has not written other books, not only for his laziness but above all for a creative block from which he cannot escape. The purpose of his existence has been to become a "socialite", but not just any socialite, but "the king of society".

Jep is surrounded by several friends: Romano, a playwright who is perpetually on the lead of a young woman who exploits him; Lello, a mouthy and wealthy toy seller; Viola, a wealthy bourgeois and mother of a son with serious mental problems named Andrea; Stefania, a self-centred radical chic writer; Dadina, the dwarf editor of the newspaper where Jep works.

One morning, he meets the husband of Elisa, a woman who has been Jep's first and probably only love: the man announces that Elisa has died, leaving behind only a diary in which the woman tells of her love for Jep; thus, her husband discovered that he had been a mere surrogate for 35 years, nothing more than "a good companion". Elisa's husband, now afflicted and grieved, will soon find consolation in the affectionate welcome of his foreign maid. After this episode, Jep begins a profound and melancholic reinterpretation of his life and a long meditation on himself and on the world around him. And, above all, he thinks about starting to write again.

During the following days, Jep meets Ramona, a stripper with a personal secret, and Cardinal Bellucci, in whom an interest in cooking is more present than in his Catholic calling; Jep is gradually convinced of the futility and uselessness of his existence. Soon his "vicious circle" also breaks down: Ramona, with whom he had established an innocent and profound relationship, dies of a terminal disease; Romano, disappointed by the deceptive attractiveness of Rome, leaves the city, seeking out only Jep to say goodbye to; Stefania, socially humiliated by Jep, who had revealed her secrets and highlighted her hypocrisy, parts Jep's social friend circle. Viola, on the other hand, after the death of her son, donates all her possessions to the Church and becomes a missionary in Africa.

Just when hopes seem to abandon Jep once and for all, he is saved by a new episode: after a meeting, pushed by Dadina, who wants to get an interview with a "Saint", a Catholic missionary nun in the Third World, Jep goes to Giglio Island to report on the shipwreck of the Costa Concordia. Right here, remembering his first meeting with Elisa in a flashback, a glimmer of hope rekindles in him.

== Cast ==
- Toni Servillo as Jep Gambardella
- Carlo Verdone as Romano
- Sabrina Ferilli as Ramona
- Carlo Buccirosso as Lello Cava
- Iaia Forte as Trumeau, Lello's wife
- Pamela Villoresi as Viola
- Galatea Ranzi as Stefania
- Franco Graziosi as Count Colonna
- Giorgio Pasotti as Stefano
- Massimo Popolizio as Alfio Bracco
- Sonia Gessner as Countess Colonna
- Anna Della Rosa as the pale girl
- Luca Marinelli as Andrea, Viola's son
- Serena Grandi as Lorena
- Ivan Franek as Ron Sweet
- Vernon Dobtcheff as Arturo
- Dario Cantarelli as the Saint's assistant
- Lillo Petrolo as Lillo De Gregorio
- Luciano Virgilio as Alfredo Marti
- Aldo Ralli as a Cardinal
- Giusi Merli as Sister Maria, the Saint
- Giovanna Vignola as Dadina
- Anita Kravos as Talia Concept
- Ludovico Caldarera as the Basilicata father
- Maria Laura Rondanini as the Basilicata mother
- Francesca Golia as the botox sister
- Silvia Munguia as Ahè
- Massimo De Francovich as Egidio
- Roberto Herlitzka as Cardinal Bellucci
- Isabella Ferrari as Orietta
- Fanny Ardant as herself (uncredited)
- Antonello Venditti as himself (uncredited)

== Music ==
No. (Note: Order of appearance in the film's closing credits. '–' indicates original music by Lele Marchitelli, individual tracks not credited in the film.)	Title	Album (Note: CD and track number from the original two-CD soundtrack album, Indigo Film IND009. '–' indicates tracks not included on the album.)	Artists	Composer
1	"I lie" (The Little Match Girl Passion)	1-01	Torino Vocalensemble	David Lang
2	Far l'amore	2-01	Bob Sinclar & Raffaella Carrà	
3	More than scarlet	2-02	Decoder Ring	
4	Mueve la colita	2–17	El Gato D.J.	
5	My heart's in the highlands	1-03	Else Torp, Christopher Bowers-Broadbent	Arvo Pärt
6	Que no se acabe el mambo	2–14	La Banda Gorda	
7	The Lamb	1-07	The choir of the Temple Church directed by Stephen Layton	John Tavener text by William Blake
8	Parade	2-06	Tape	
9	III. Lento—Cantabile-semplice from Symphony No. 3	1–10	London Sinfonietta, Dawn Upshaw directed by David Zinman	Henryk Górecki
10	World to come IV	1-02	Maya Beiser	David Lang
11	Moody	–	ESG	
12	Take my breath away	2-03	Gui Boratto	
13	The beatitudes	1-05	Kronos Quartet	Vladimir Martynov
14	Forever	2-08	Antonello Venditti	Maurizio Fabrizio
15	Pancho	–		
16	There must be an angel (playing with my heart)	–	Lorraine Bowen	Annie Lennox, David A. Stewart
17	Water from the same source	2–10	Rachel's	
18	II. Adagio from Symphony in C major	1-08	film: Leopold Stokowski and his Symphony Orchestra album: New Zealand Symphony Orchestra conducted by Donald Johanos	Georges Bizet
19	Dies irae from Requiem for my Friend	1-06	Elżbieta Towarnicka, Dariusz Paradowski, Piotr Lykowski, Piotr Kusiewicz, Grzegorz Zychowicz and Jan Szypowski	Zbigniew Preisner
20	Everything trying	2–05	Damien Jurado	
21	Discoteca	2–16	Exchpoptrue	
22	We no speak americano	2–15	Studio Allstars	
23	Ti ruberò	2–12	Monica Cetti	
24	Trois mouvements perpétuels	–	Peter Beijersbergen van Henegouwen	Francis Poulenc
25	Beata viscera	1–11	Vox Clamantis	Magister Perotinus
–	Time	1-04		Lele Marchitelli (it)
–	River flows	1-09		Lele Marchitelli
–	Brain waves	2-04		Lele Marchitelli
–	Color my world	2-07		Lele Marchitelli
–	Surge of excitement	2-09		Lele Marchitelli
–	Settembre non comincia	2–11		Lele Marchitelli
–	Trumeau	2–13		Lele Marchitelli
–	Ramona	2–18	Los Paraguayos and Luis Alberto del Paraná	Lele Marchitelli

== Reception ==
=== Italian Criticism ===
Philippe Ridet, Rome correspondent for Le Monde, criticized the film in Internazionale while supporting the perspectives of journalists from La Stampa, Raffaella Silipo and Gianni Riotta:

The victory of Italy? Yes, but which Italy? 'The Americans imagine Italy exactly like this,' Raffaella Silipo noted last Monday in La Stampa: 'Magnificent stones and inconclusive inhabitants, young people fleeing, and old people painting themselves and forgetting as they dance.' On Tuesday, La Stampa’s Gianni Riotta evoked a reward that 'sounds like a warning': 'Sorrentino signs the film of an Italy resigned to lacking credibility. Let’s continue like this, and we’ll end up as elegant vagabonds looking at the past, maybe winning plenty of Oscars, but without a dignified future.' But the six thousand voters in Hollywood are like this. They love Italy for how they imagine it, just like all the jury members who awarded the film across the world before its triumph in Los Angeles. 5 May 2014.

Ridet's perspective was countered in an article by Tiziano Peccia for the Brazilian academic journal O Olho da História. The article, dedicated to beauty, followed the death of Umberto Eco:

Philippe Ridet’s vision taints the intelligence of the peninsula with grotesque and superficial tones, reducing Italy to the idea of celebrating its own decadence. His statement, drawn from his article 'Italy laughs at seeing itself in the mirror of La Grande Bellezza,' stereotypes the average Italian as a Griffolino d’Arezzo from Dante’s Divine Comedy, a character full of airs despite his infernal placement.

Yet, we must ask ourselves a question: Was this Sorrentino’s message? Did the Neapolitan director aim to emphasize the theme of Italian decadence, as denounced by the media? Or rather, more profoundly, was his focus on the modern and worldly frenzy that seduces, beguiles, entices, and then leaves one burdened with a handful of shattered, cursed dreams?

The fact that a film like La Grande Bellezza can be interpreted as a limited picture of Italian issues smells, to borrow expressions from journalist Marco Travaglio, of rhetoric and provincialism. It’s the provincialism of a people probably no longer accustomed to hearing about themselves in a positive or meritocratic light—a nation that turns into mockery a well-crafted work appreciated globally. This widespread provincialism is a new fruit for a country like Italy, accustomed to millennia of greatness and artistic production recognized and esteemed everywhere.

Why is it that a work about moral decay, such as Petronius’s Satyricon, describing animalistic instincts and dissoluteness, is interpreted as a reflection on a vicious, savage humanity, rather than a critical portrayal of the dissolute realities of Pozzuoli and Crotone?

Tiziano Peccia, "Critica e critiche alla grande bellezza," O Olho da História, Issue 22 (April 2016)

It has been observed that while international film criticism has generally judged Sorrentino's film positively, Italian critics have been divided with harsh judgments:

If only La grande bellezza were content to be a bad movie. It is instead "a new emotional experience," as Walter Veltroni wrote yesterday in the Messaggero.

— Nanni Delbecchi, review in Il Fatto Quotidiano, 30 May 2013

Or, on the contrary, with great appreciation:

This tribute to the Capital, signed by Paolo Sorrentino, is a disorganized, opulent, fragmentary, and shameless film, but also one so beautiful it will move you to tears.

— Alessia Starace, review in Movieplayer.it, 21 May 2013

This contrast of opinions has been interpreted in various ways, but in negative evaluations, it seems to reconnect with the recurring notion of the director's presumed arrogance and ambition to propose his vision, almost as if it were a sequel to La dolce vita by Federico Fellini, which instead resonates with the imagination of international audiences who appreciate this portrayal.

=== Critical response ===
The film has a 91% approval rating on Rotten Tomatoes, based on 135 reviews, with a weighted average rating of 8/10. The website's critical consensus states, "Dazzlingly ambitious, beautifully filmed, and thoroughly enthralling, The Great Beauty offers virtuoso filmmaking from writer/director Paolo Sorrentino." The film holds a score of 86/100 on Metacritic based on 34 reviews, signifying "universal acclaim".

Robbie Collin at The Daily Telegraph awarded Sorrentino's film the maximum five stars and described it as "a shimmering coup de cinema". He likened it to Roberto Rossellini's Rome, Open City and Federico Fellini's La Dolce Vita in its ambition to record a period of Roman history on film. "Rossellini covered the Nazi occupation of 1944; Fellini the seductive, empty hedonism of the years that followed. Sorrentino's plan is to do the same for the Berlusconi era," he wrote. Deborah Young of The Hollywood Reporter stated "Sorrentino's vision of moral chaos and disorder, spiritual and emotional emptiness at this moment in time is even darker than Fellini's (though Ettore Scola's The Terrace certainly comes in somewhere)." Critics have also identified other purposefully explicit film homages: to Roma, 8½, Scola's Splendor, Michelangelo Antonioni's La notte. Spanish film director Pedro Almodóvar named the film as one of the twelve best films of 2013, placing it second in his list. In 2016, the film was ranked among the 100 greatest films since 2000 in an international critics poll by 177 critics around the world. It is currently director Paolo Sorrentino's second highest rated film on Rotten Tomatoes. In 2025, it was one of the films voted for the "Readers' Choice" edition of The New York Times' list of "The 100 Best Movies of the 21st Century," finishing at number 220.

=== Film critics' top lists ===
Various critics named the film as one of the best of 2013.

- 1st: Time Out London's 10 Best films of 2013
- 1st: Robbie Collin, The Daily Telegraph
- 2nd: Xan Brooks, The Guardian
- 2nd: Richard Corliss, Time
- 3rd: Chris Vognar, The Dallas Morning News
- 4th: Sight & Sound
- 4th: Lisa Schwarzbaum, BBC
- 6th: Jake Coyle, Associated Press
- 7th: Stephen Holden, The New York Times
- 8th: Simon Abrams & Alan Scherstuhl, The Village Voice
- 9th: Robert Gifford, The Diamondback
- 9th: Empire's 50 Best Films of 2013
- Best films of 2013: Peter Bradshaw, The Guardian
- Best Film of 2013: Justin Chang, Variety

Peter Bradshaw also named the film as one of the 20 best films of the 21st Century in the Guardian.

=== Awards and nominations ===
List of Accolades
Organizations / Festivals	Category	Recipient(s)	Result
86th Academy Awards	Best International Feature Film	Italy	Won
79th New York Film Critics Circle Awards	Best Foreign Language Film	Paolo Sorrentino	Runner-up
71st Golden Globe Awards	Best Motion Picture – Foreign Language	Paolo Sorrentino	Won
67th British Academy Film Awards	Best Film Not in the English Language	Paolo Sorrentino	Won
67th Silver Ribbon Awards	Best Director	Paolo Sorrentino	Nominated
67th Silver Ribbon Awards	Best Producer	Nicola Giuliano and Francesca Cima	Nominated
67th Silver Ribbon Awards	Best Screenplay	Paolo Sorrentino and Umberto Contarello	Nominated
67th Silver Ribbon Awards	Best Supporting Actor	Carlo Verdone	Won
67th Silver Ribbon Awards	Best Supporting Actress	Sabrina Ferilli	Won
67th Silver Ribbon Awards	Best Cinematography	Luca Bigazzi	Won
67th Silver Ribbon Awards	Best Costumes	Daniela Ciancio	Nominated
67th Silver Ribbon Awards	Best Sound	Emanuele Cecere	Won
67th Silver Ribbon Awards	Best Score	Lele Marchitelli	Nominated
66th Cannes Film Festival	Palme d'Or	Paolo Sorrentino	Nominated
60th Belgian Film Critics Association	Grand Prix	Paolo Sorrentino	Nominated
59th David di Donatello Awards	Best Film	Nicola Giuliano and Francesca Cima	Nominated
59th David di Donatello Awards	Best Director	Paolo Sorrentino	Won
59th David di Donatello Awards	Best Script	Paolo Sorrentino and Umberto Contarello	Nominated
59th David di Donatello Awards	Best Producer	Francesca Cima and Francesca Cima	Won
59th David di Donatello Awards	Best Actor in a Leading Role	Toni Servillo	Won
59th David di Donatello Awards	Best Actress in a Leading Role	Sabrina Ferilli	Nominated
59th David di Donatello Awards	Best Actor in a Supporting Role	Carlo Verdone	Nominated
59th David di Donatello Awards	Best Actress in a Supporting Role	Galatea Ranzi	Nominated
59th David di Donatello Awards	Best Cinematography	Luca Bigazzi	Won
59th David di Donatello Awards	Best Score	Lele Marchitelli	Nominated
59th David di Donatello Awards	Best Production Design	Stefania Cella	Won
59th David di Donatello Awards	Best Costumes	Daniela Ciancio	Won
59th David di Donatello Awards	Best Make-up	Maurizio Silvi	Won
59th David di Donatello Awards	Best Hairstyling	Aldo Signoretti	Won
59th David di Donatello Awards	Best Editing	Cristiano Travaglioli	Nominated
59th David di Donatello Awards	Best Sound	Emanuele Cecere	Nominated
59th David di Donatello Awards	Best Special Visual Effects	Rodolfo Migliari and Luca Della Grotta	Won
59th David di Donatello Awards	David Giovani Award	Paolo Sorrentino	Nominated
53rd Italian Golden Globe	Best Directing	Paolo Sorrentino	Nominated
53rd Italian Golden Globe	Best Leading Actor	Toni Servillo	Nominated
53rd Italian Golden Globe	Best Cinematography	Luca Bigazzi	Won
53rd Italian Golden Globe	Best Music	Lele Marchitelli	Nominated
39th César Awards	Best Foreign Film	Paolo Sorrentino	Nominated
34th London Film Critics Circle Awards	Best Film	Nicola Giuliano and Francesca Cima	Nominated
34th London Film Critics Circle Awards	Director of the Year	Paolo Sorrentino	Nominated
34th London Film Critics Circle Awards	Best Foreign Language Film	Paolo Sorrentino	Nominated
34th Boston Society of Film Critics Awards	Best Foreign Language Film	Paolo Sorrentino	Won
29th Ciak d'oro	Best Film	Paolo Sorrentino	Won
29th Ciak d'oro	Best Actor	Toni Servillo	Won
29th Ciak d'oro	Best Supporting Actor	Carlo Verdone	Won
29th Ciak d'oro	Best Supporting Actress	Sabrina Ferilli	Won
29th Ciak d'oro	Best Producer	Nicola Giuliano and Francesca Cima	Won
29th Ciak d'oro	Best Cinematography	Luca Bigazzi	Won
29th Ciak d'oro	Best Sets and Decorations	Stefania Cella	Won
29th Ciak d'oro	Best Costumes	Daniela Ciancio	Won
29th Ciak d'oro	Best Screenwriter	Paolo Sorrentino and Umberto Contarello	Nominated
29th Ciak d'oro	Best Sound	Emanuele Cecere and Francesco Sabez	Nominated
29th Ciak d'oro	Best Editing	Cristiano Travaglioli	Nominated
29th Ciak d'oro	Best Music	Lele Marchitelli	Nominated
29th Ciak d'oro	Best Movie Poster	Anna Di Cintio, Matteo Desogus, Fabrizio Caperna and Geo Ceccarelli	Nominated
29th Independent Spirit Awards	Best Foreign Film	Paolo Sorrentino	Nominated
28th Goya Awards	Best European Film	Paolo Sorrentino	Nominated
26th European Film Awards	Best Film	Paolo Sorrentino	Won
26th European Film Awards	Best Director	Paolo Sorrentino	Won
26th European Film Awards	Best Actor	Toni Servillo	Won
26th European Film Awards	Best Screenwriter	Paolo Sorrentino and Umberto Contarello	Nominated
26th European Film Awards	Best Editor	Cristiano Travaglioli	Won
20th Dallas–Fort Worth Film Critics Association Awards	Best Foreign Language Film	Paolo Sorrentino	Nominated
19th Critics' Choice Awards	Best Foreign Language Film	Paolo Sorrentino	Nominated
18th Florida Film Critics Circle Awards	Best Foreign Language Film	Paolo Sorrentino	Nominated
18th Satellite Awards	Best Foreign Language Film	Paolo Sorrentino	Nominated
17th Hollywood Film Awards	Best International Film	Paolo Sorrentino	Won
17th Hollywood Film Awards	Best Independent Film	Paolo Sorrentino	Won
17th Hollywood Film Awards	Best New Screenplay	Paolo Sorrentino and Umberto Contarello	Won
17th Hollywood Film Awards	Best Actor	Toni Servillo	Nominated
17th Hollywood Film Awards	Breakout Performance	Toni Servillo	Nominated
17th Tallinn Black Nights Film Festival	Grand Prix	Paolo Sorrentino	Won
17th Tallinn Black Nights Film Festival	Jury Prix	Luca Bigazzi	Won
16th British Independent Film Awards	Best Foreign Independent Film	Paolo Sorrentino	Nominated
15th Cinemanila International Film Festival	Lino Brocka Award for Best Film	Paolo Sorrentino	Won
11th International Cinephile Society Awards	Best Film	Paolo Sorrentino	Nominated
11th International Cinephile Society Awards	Best Foreign Film	Paolo Sorrentino	Nominated

== See also ==
- List of submissions to the 86th Academy Awards for Best Foreign Language Film
- List of Italian submissions for the Academy Award for Best Foreign Language Film
