= Giusi Merli =

Italian theatre and movie actress (born 1943)

Giusi
- Born: Giuseppina Merli; 26 March 1943 (age 81)
- Occupation: Actress
- Years active: 1960s-present

Giusi (Giuseppina) Merli (born 26 March 1943 in Pisa, Italy) is an Italian theatre and movie actress. She performed in more than 200 theatrical and film productions. Merli is best known for the role of Sister Maria (inspired by Mother Teresa) in The Great Beauty by Paolo Sorrentino.

== Early life ==
Merli earned a degree in Foreign Languages and Literatures at the University of Pisa.

She studied with Russian-American director Vladimir Olshansky. She performed in classical texts (Antigone, The Bacchae, A Midsummer Night's Dream, The Tempest) and modern dramatic (Woyzeck) and comic texts (Monsieur de Pourceaugnac). She worked in Italy and abroad in roles with directors including Aldo Rostagno, John Jesurun, Paul Pierazzini, Dario Marconcini, Angelo Savelli, Marco Cavicchioli, Paolo Rossi, Rolando Ravello, Paolo Virzì and Paolo Sorrentino.

== Selected filmography ==
- Via Don Minzoni N.6 (2021)
- Thanks! (2019)
- Stories of chestnut woods (original title: Zgodbe iz kostanjevih gozdov) (2017)
- Like Crazy (original title: La pazza gioia) (2016)
- Do You Remember Me? (original title: Ti ricordi di me?) (2014)
- Giulia's keys (original title: Le note di Giulia) (short-2014)
- The Great Beauty (original title: La grande bellezza) (2013)
- Pulce is not here (original title: Pulce non c'è) (2012)
- Red Like the Sky (original title: Rosso come il cielo) (2006)
- Dune: Part Two (2024)

== Selected theatre ==
- The Giants of the Mountain by Pirandello (2010)
- Romeo & Juliet, Serata di Delirio organizzato (2010)
- Monsieur de Pourceaugnac by Moliere (2009)
- Satyricon 2000 (2009)
- The Bacchantes by Euripides (2008)
- Woyzeck by Georg Büchner (2008)
- Isabella (2007)

== Selected television ==
- Immaturi (2016)
- Commissario Manara (2006)
