= Another End =

2024 film by Piero Messina

- Italian theatrical release poster
- Directed by: Piero Messina
- Written by: Piero Messina; Giacomo Bendotti; Valentina Gaddi; Sebastiano Melloni
- Produced by: Carlotta Calori; Francesca Cima; Nicola Giuliano; Viola Prestieri
- Starring: Gael García Bernal; Renate Reinsve; Bérénice Bejo; Olivia Williams
- Cinematography: Fabrizio La Palombara
- Edited by: Paola Freddi
- Music by: Bruno Falanga
- Production companies: Indigo Film; Rai Cinema
- Distributed by: Newen Connect
- Release dates: 18 February 2024 (Berlin); 21 March 2024 (Italy)
- Running time: 119 minutes
- Countries: Italy; France; United Kingdom
- Language: English
- Box office: $233,357

Another End is a 2024 science fiction romance film written and directed by Piero Messina. It premiered at the 74th Berlin International Film Festival on 18 February 2024, before receiving a theatrical release in Italy on 21 March 2024.

== Plot ==
After Sal loses Zoe, the love of his life, in a car crash, he falls into deep depression. His sister Ebe, who watches her brother with growing concern, wants to help him. She works at Aeternum, a company that offers the new technology "Another End" to give the bereaved the opportunity to say goodbye to deceased loved ones in a special way. The memories and consciousness of the deceased, which are stored in the company's database, are fed into a suitable host. The grieving relatives can then interact with the loved one (in someone else's body) in one or more sessions. According to the company's motto, this is intended to enable "another end" for them. The brain of the host absorbs the memories of the deceased, and every time they fall asleep they forget everything, but this process cannot be repeated indefinitely.

At first, neither Sal nor Zoe's parents want to try this method of coping with their pain. Sal blames himself for Zoe's death, as he was at the wheel in the car accident that claimed her life, and tries to kill himself with pills and alcohol. Ebe finds him in time and is able to prevent the attempt. She also manages to convince Zoe's mother to agree to Zoe's "resuscitation". Sal also finally agrees after a therapist and colleague of Ebe's tells him more about the process. However, he remains skeptical as to whether he will be able to feel a connection to "his Zoe" when she doesn't look like herself.

He recognizes Zoe in Ava's body when he follows the therapist's advice and starts an argument with her. He falls in love with her again, is happy and doesn't want to say goodbye to her. He manages to persuade Ebe to give him more time together with Zoe-Ava, even though this jeopardizes her job. However, when the program comes to an end, he doesn't want to stand idly by and watch his newfound love disappear again. He follows the host Ava to her workplace in a strip club and meets up with her several times without revealing that he knows her through the host program. In the process, he learns that Ava has lost her child and is offering herself as a host to escape the daily grind.

Since they exceeded the recommended amount of sessions, Ava seems to remember little things from Zoe's past. She finally finds out who Sal is and withdraws. Sal becomes depressed again, but then learns from Ebe that Ava has contacted her and wants to meet up with him again. Ebe is fired from the company because she was resuscitating her brother Sal the whole time, who had already died, as Ebe couldn't handle Sal's death. The Sal/Rental Body and Zoe/Ava wake up together after spending the night together and smile.

== Cast ==
- Gael García Bernal as Sal
- Renate Reinsve as Zoe / Ava
- Bérénice Bejo as Ebe, Sal's sister
- Olivia Williams as Juliette
- Philip Rosch as Ben
- Pal Aron as Doctor Doyle
- Tim Daish as Karl

== Production ==
Filming took place in Paris and Rome and was completed by February 2023.

== Release ==
The film premiered at the 74th Berlin International Film Festival on 18 February 2024, before receiving a theatrical release in Italy on 21 March 2024. In August 2025, the film was acquired for distribution in the United States by Sunrise Films.

== Reception ==
=== Box office ===
Another End grossed $233,357 in Italy.

=== Critical response ===
On the review aggregator website Rotten Tomatoes, 29% of 17 critics' reviews are positive, with an average rating of 4.7/10. Metacritic, which uses a weighted average, assigned the film a score of 52 out of 100, based on seven critics, indicating "mixed or average" reviews.
