= The Man Who Bought the Moon =

2018 comedy film

- Directed by: Paolo Zucca
- Screenplay by: Paolo Zucca; Barbara Alberti; Geppi Cucciari
- Produced by: Amedeo Pagani; Francesca Cima; Nicola Giuliano; Daniel Burman; Genc Permeti
- Starring: Jacopo Cullin; Stefano Fresi; Francesco Pannofino
- Cinematography: Ramiro Civita
- Edited by: Sarah McTeigue
- Music by: Andrea Guerra
- Release date: 2018
- Language: Italian

The Man Who Bought the Moon (Italian: L'uomo che comprò la Luna, Spanish: El hombre que compró la luna) is a 2018 Italian-Argentine-Albanian comedy film co-written and directed by Paolo Zucca and starring Jacopo Cullin, Stefano Fresi and Francesco Pannofino.

== Cast ==
- Jacopo Cullin as Kevin Pirelli / Gavino Zoccheddu
- Stefano Fresi as Pino
- Francesco Pannofino as Dino
- Benito Urgu as Badore
- Ángela Molina as Teresa
- Lazar Ristovski as Taneddu
- Andrea Prodan as Dr. Badaloni

== Production ==
The film was shot between Cagliari, Oristano, San Vero Milis, Cabras and Buenos Aires. Shooting wrapped in late October 2017. Zucca cited among its inspirations the 1973 comic book Asterix in Corsica.

== Release ==
The film premiered at the 23rd Busan International Film Festival, in the Flash Forward section. It served as pre-opening film at the 2018 Rome Film Festival. It was released in Sardinian cinemas on 4 April 2019, before expanding nationally on 2 May 2019.

== Reception ==
In its first week of release, the film had the second-highest grossing per theater, very close to The Avengers. The film has been described as "a surreal, absurdist journey aiming to push the boundaries of comedic drama while handing out a succession of breathtaking sceneries" and "a deliciously arty and far fetched slapstick".

For his performance in this film, in Don't Stop Me Now and in C'è tempo, Stefano Fresi won the 2019 Nastro d'Argento for best comedy actor.
