= Ultras (film) =

- Directed by: Francesco Lettieri
- Written by: Francesco Lettieri
- Starring: Aniello Arena; Ciro Nacca; Simone Borrelli
- Music by: Liberato
- Production companies: Indigo Film; Mediaset
- Distributed by: Netflix
- Release date: March 9, 2020
- Running time: 108 minutes
- Country: Italy
- Language: Italian

Ultras is a 2020 Italian drama written and directed by Francesco Lettieri and starring Aniello Arena, Ciro Nacca and Simone Borrelli. The plot revolves around emerging violence by football fans in Naples, Italy.

It was released on 20 March 2020 on Netflix. The movie's soundtrack was written by Liberato, and released in an homonymous album.

== Cast ==
- Aniello Arena as Sandro
- Ciro Nacca as Angelo
- Simone Borrelli as Pechegno
- Daniele Vicorito as Gabbiano
- Salvatore Pelliccia as Barabba
- Antonia Truppo as Terry

== Release ==
Ultras was released by Netflix on March 3, 2020.
