= David di Donatello for Best International Film =

Annual Italian award

The David di Donatello for Best International Film (Italian: David di Donatello per il miglior film internazionale), known as the David di Donatello for Best Foreign Film (Italian: David di Donatello per il miglior film straniero) prior to 2022, is a category in the David di Donatello Awards, described as "Italy's answer to the Oscars", presented annually by the Accademia del Cinema Italiano (ACI, Academy of Italian Cinema) since the 1959 edition. The category is specifically for films not competing for European honours. No awards were granted during the 1960 and 1961 editions, from 1965 to 1971, and in 1981. Starting from the 2019 edition, the award also includes films that previously would have belonged to the category of Best European Film.

== Winners and nominees ==
Winners are indicated in bold.

=== 1950s–1960s ===
1958 The Prince and the Showgirl, directed by Laurence Olivier
1959 Gigi, directed by Vincente Minnelli
1960 No Award
1961 Ben Hur, directed by William Wyler
1962 Judgment at Nuremberg, directed by Stanley Kramer
1963 The Longest Day, produced by Darryl F. Zanuck
1964 Lawrence of Arabia, directed by David Lean
1965 My Fair Lady, directed by George Cukor
1966 The Agony and the Ecstasy, directed by Carol Reed
1967 Doctor Zhivago, directed by David Lean
1968 Guess Who's Coming to Dinner, directed by Stanley Kramer
1969 2001: A Space Odyssey, directed by Stanley Kubrick

=== 1970s ===
1970 The Lion in Winter, directed by Anthony Harvey
1971 Ryan's Daughter, directed by David Lean
1972 The French Connection, directed by William Friedkin
1973 The Godfather, directed by Francis Ford Coppola
1974 Jesus Christ Superstar, directed by Norman Jewison
1975 The Towering Inferno, directed by Irwin Allen
1976 Nashville, directed by Robert Altman
1977 Marathon Man, directed by John Schlesinger
1978 Close Encounters of the Third Kind, directed by Steven Spielberg
1979 The Wishing Tree (ნატვრის ხე / Natvris khe), directed by Tengiz Abuladze

=== 1980s ===
1980

- **Kramer vs. Kramer**, directed by Robert Benton

1981

- No Award

1982

- **Mephisto**, directed by István Szabó
  - Marianne and Juliane (Die bleierne Zeit), directed by Margarethe von Trotta
  - Reds, directed by Warren Beatty

1983

- **Gandhi**, directed by Richard Attenborough
  - The Way (Yol), directed by Yılmaz Güney
  - Victor/Victoria, directed by Blake Edwards
  - Missing, directed by Costa-Gavras

1984

- **Fanny and Alexander**, directed by Ingmar Bergman
  - Terms of Endearment, directed by James L. Brooks
  - Zelig, directed by Woody Allen

1985

- **Amadeus**, directed by Miloš Forman
  - The Killing Fields, directed by Roland Joffé
  - Paris, Texas, directed by Wim Wenders

1986

- **Out of Africa**, directed by Sydney Pollack
  - Another Time, Another Place, directed by Michael Radford
  - Ran (乱), directed by Akira Kurosawa

1987

- **A Room with a View**, directed by James Ivory
  - The Official Story (La historia oficial), directed by Luis Puenzo
  - The Mission, directed by Roland Joffé

1988

- **Au revoir les enfants**, directed by Louis Malle
  - The Dead, directed by John Huston
  - Full Metal Jacket, directed by Stanley Kubrick

1989

- **Rain Man**, directed by Barry Levinson
  - Mississippi Burning, directed by Alan Parker
  - Women on the Verge of a Nervous Breakdown (Mujeres al borde de un ataque de nervios), directed by Pedro Almodóvar

=== 1990s ===
1990

- **Dead Poets Society**, directed by Peter Weir
  - Crimes and Misdemeanors, directed by Woody Allen
  - May Fools (Milou en mai), directed by Louis Malle
  - Reunion, directed by Jerry Schatzberg
  - Life and Nothing But (La vie et rien d'autre), directed by Bertrand Tavernier

1991

- **Cyrano de Bergerac**, directed by Jean-Paul Rappeneau (ex aequo)
  **Hamlet**, directed by Franco Zeffirelli (ex aequo)
  - Dances with Wolves, directed by Kevin Costner
  - Nikita, directed by Luc Besson
  - Goodfellas, directed by Martin Scorsese

1992

- **Raise the Red Lantern** (Dà Hóng Dēnglóng Gāogāo Guà / 大紅燈籠高高掛), directed by Zhang Yimou
  - Thelma & Louise, directed by Ridley Scott
  - Shadows and Fog, directed by Woody Allen

1993

- **A Heart in Winter** (Un coeur en hiver), directed by Claude Sautet
  - Howards End, directed by James Ivory
  - The Crying Game, directed by Neil Jordan

1994

- **In the Name of the Father**, directed by Jim Sheridan
  - The Remains of the Day, directed by James Ivory
  - Schindler's List, directed by Steven Spielberg

1995

- **Pulp Fiction**, directed by Quentin Tarantino
  - Forrest Gump, directed by Robert Zemeckis
  - Burnt by the Sun (Утомлённые солнцем / Utomlyonnye solntsem), directed by Nikita Mikhalkov

1996

- **Nelly and Mr. Arnaud** (Nelly et Monsieur Arnaud), directed by Claude Sautet
  - Mighty Aphrodite, directed by Woody Allen
  - Smoke, directed by Wayne Wang

1997

- **Ridicule**, directed by Patrice Leconte

1998

- **The Full Monty**, directed by Peter Cattaneo
  - Amistad, directed by Steven Spielberg
  - The Thief (Vor), directed by Pavel Chukhray

1999

- **Train of Life** (Train de vie), directed by Radu Mihaileanu
  - Shakespeare in Love, directed by John Madden
  - Central Station (Central do Brasil), directed by Walter Salles

=== 2000s ===
2000

- **All About My Mother** (Todo sobre mi madre), directed by Pedro Almodóvar
  - American Beauty, directed by Sam Mendes
  - East Is East, directed by Damien O'Donnell

2001

- **The Taste of Others** (Le goût des autres), directed by Agnès Jaoui
  - Billy Elliot, directed by Stephen Daldry
  - Chocolat, directed by Lasse Hallström
  - In the Mood for Love (花樣年華 / Fa yeung nin wa), directed by Wong Kar-wai

2002

- **The Man Who Wasn't There**, directed by Joel Coen and Ethan Coen
  - Amélie (Le fabuleux destin d'Amélie Poulain), directed by Jean-Pierre Jeunet
  - No Man's Land (Ničija zemlja), directed by Danis Tanović

2003

- **The Pianist**, directed by Roman Polanski
  - Chicago, directed by Rob Marshall
  - Talk to Her (Hable con ella), directed by Pedro Almodóvar
  - The Hours, directed by Stephen Daldry
  - The Man on the Train (L'homme du train), directed by Patrice Leconte

2004

- **The Barbarian Invasions** (Les Invasions barbares), directed by Denys Arcand
  - Big Fish, directed by Tim Burton
  - Lost in Translation, directed by Sofia Coppola
  - Master and Commander: The Far Side of the World, directed by Peter Weir
  - Mystic River, directed by Clint Eastwood

2005

- **Million Dollar Baby**, directed by Clint Eastwood
  - 2046, directed by Wong Kar-wai
  - 3-Iron (빈집 / Bin-jip), directed by Kim Ki-duk
  - Hotel Rwanda, directed by Terry George
  - Ray, directed by Taylor Hackford

2006

- **Crash**, directed by Paul Haggis
  - A History of Violence, directed by David Cronenberg
  - Good Night, and Good Luck., directed by George Clooney
  - Brokeback Mountain, directed by Ang Lee
  - Tsotsi, directed by Gavin Hood

2007

- **Babel**, directed by Alejandro González Iñárritu
  - Letters from Iwo Jima, directed by Clint Eastwood
  - Little Miss Sunshine, directed by Jonathan Dayton and Valerie Faris
  - The Pursuit of Happyness, directed by Gabriele Muccino
  - The Departed, directed by Martin Scorsese

2008

- **No Country for Old Men**, directed by Joel Coen and Ethan Coen
  - Across the Universe, directed by Julie Taymor
  - Into the Wild, directed by Sean Penn
  - In the Valley of Elah, directed by Paul Haggis
  - There Will Be Blood, directed by Paul Thomas Anderson

2009

- **Gran Torino**, directed by Clint Eastwood
  - Milk, directed by Gus Van Sant
  - The Visitor, directed by Tom McCarthy
  - The Wrestler, directed by Darren Aronofsky
  - WALL-E, directed by Andrew Stanton

=== 2010s ===
Year	English title	Original title	Director(s)	Ref.
2010	**Inglourious Basterds**		**Quentin Tarantino**	
2010	A Serious Man		Joel Coen and Ethan Coen	
2010	Avatar		James Cameron	
2010	Invictus		Clint Eastwood	
2010	Up in the Air		Jason Reitman	
2011	**Hereafter**		**Clint Eastwood**	
2011	Black Swan		Darren Aronofsky	
2011	Incendies		Denis Villeneuve	
2011	The Social Network		David Fincher	
2011	Inception		Christopher Nolan	
2012	**A Separation**	**جدایی نادر از سیمین**	**Asghar Farhadi**	
2012	Drive		Nicolas Winding Refn	
2012	The Tree of Life		Terrence Malick	
2012	The Ides of March		George Clooney	
2012	Hugo		Martin Scorsese	
2013	**Django Unchained**		**Quentin Tarantino**	
2013	Life of Pi		Ang Lee	
2013	Argo		Ben Affleck	
2013	Silver Linings Playbook		David O. Russell	
2013	Lincoln		Steven Spielberg	
2014	**The Grand Budapest Hotel**		**Wes Anderson**	
2014	12 Years a Slave		Steve McQueen	
2014	Blue Jasmine		Woody Allen	
2014	American Hustle		David O. Russell	
2014	The Wolf of Wall Street		Martin Scorsese	
2015	**Birdman**		**Alejandro González Iñárritu**	
2015	Boyhood		Richard Linklater	
2015	The Salt of the Earth		Wim Wenders	
2015	American Sniper		Clint Eastwood	
2015	Mommy		Xavier Dolan	
2016	**Bridge of Spies**		**Steven Spielberg**	
2016	Carol		Todd Haynes	
2016	Inside Out		Pete Docter	
2016	Remember		Atom Egoyan	
2016	Spotlight		Thomas McCarthy	
2017	**Nocturnal Animals**		**Tom Ford**	
2017	Captain Fantastic		Matt Ross	
2017	Lion		Garth Davis	
2017	Paterson		Jim Jarmusch	
2017	Sully		Clint Eastwood	
2018	**Dunkirk**		**Christopher Nolan**	
2018	La La Land		Damien Chazelle	
2018	The Insult	قضية رقم 23	Ziad Doueiri	
2018	Manchester by the Sea		Kenneth Lonergan	
2018	Loveless	Нелюбовь	Andrey Zvyagintsev	
2019	**Roma**		**Alfonso Cuarón**	
2019	Cold War	Zimna wojna	Paweł Pawlikowski	
2019	Bohemian Rhapsody		Bryan Singer	
2019	Three Billboards Outside Ebbing, Missouri		Martin McDonagh	
2019	Phantom Thread		Paul Thomas Anderson	

=== 2020s ===
Year	English title	Original title	Director(s)	Ref.
2020	**Parasite**	**기생충**	**Bong Joon Ho**	
2020	Green Book		Peter Farrelly	
2020	Joker		Todd Phillips	
2020	An Officer and a Spy	J'accuse	Roman Polanski	
2020	Once Upon a Time in Hollywood		Quentin Tarantino	
2021	**1917**		**Sam Mendes**	
2021	Les Misérables		Ladj Ly	
2021	Richard Jewell		Clint Eastwood	
2021	Jojo Rabbit		Taika Waititi	
2021	Sorry We Missed You		Ken Loach	
2022	**Belfast**		**Kenneth Branagh**	
2022	Drive My Car	ドライブ・マイ・カー	Ryusuke Hamaguchi	
2022	Dune		Denis Villeneuve	
2022	The Power of the Dog		Jane Campion	
2022	Don't Look Up		Adam McKay	
2023	**The Fabelmans**		**Steven Spielberg**	
2023	Bones and All		Luca Guadagnino	
2023	Elvis		Baz Luhrmann	
2023	Licorice Pizza		Paul Thomas Anderson	
2023	Triangle of Sadness		Ruben Östlund	
2024	**Anatomy of a Fall**	**Anatomie d'une chute**	**Justine Triet**	
2024	The Beasts	As bestas	Rodrigo Sorogoyen	
2024	Fallen Leaves	Kuolleet lehdet	Aki Kaurismäki	
2024	Killers of the Flower Moon		Martin Scorsese	
2024	Oppenheimer		Christopher Nolan	
2025	**Anora**		**Sean Baker**	
2025	Conclave		Edward Berger	
2025	Juror No. 2		Clint Eastwood	
2025	The Zone of Interest		Jonathan Glazer	
2025	Perfect Days		Wim Wenders	
2026	**One Battle After Another**		**Paul Thomas Anderson**	
2026	The Brutalist		Brady Corbet	
2026	I'm Still Here		Walter Salles	
2026	It Was Just an Accident		Jafar Panahi	
2026	The Voice of Hind Rajab		Kaouther Ben Hania	

== Awards by nation ==
Country	Number of winning films	Number of nominated films
United States of America	35	81
United Kingdom	11	18
France	8	8
Canada	1	3
Spain	1	2
Poland	1	1
South Korea	1	1
Sweden	1	1
China	1	0
Hungary	1	0
Iran	1	0
(Republic of Ireland) Ireland	1	0
Mexico	1	0
(Soviet Union) Union of Soviet Socialist Republics (Note: The Soviet Union received its nomination for a and was formally dissolved on 26 December 1991.)	1	0
Russia	0	3
Germany (Note: Includes films of West Germany.)	0	2
Hong Kong	0	2
Japan	0	3
Argentina	0	1
Australia	0	1
Brazil	0	1
Bosnia and Herzegovina	0	1
Lebanon	0	1
South Africa	0	1
Turkey	0	1
New Zealand	0	1
