= The Mouth of the Wolf (2009 film) =

- Directed by: Pietro Marcello
- Written by: Pietro Marcello
- Produced by: Francesca Cima; Nicola Giuliano; Dario Zonta
- Starring: Mary Monaco; Vincenzo Motta
- Cinematography: Pietro Marcello
- Edited by: Sara Fgaier
- Music by: Marco Messina and Massimiliano Sacchi for Era
- Distributed by: BIM Distribuzione
- Release dates: November 16, 2009 (Turin Festival); February 19, 2010 (Italy)
- Running time: 68 minutes
- Country: Italy
- Language: Italian

The Mouth of the Wolf (original title: La bocca del lupo) is a 2009 biographical drama/documentary film written and directed by Pietro Marcello. It premièred at the 2009 Torino Film Festival in Turin, and won the FIPRESCI Prize for 'Best Film' and the Prize of the City of Torino. In 2010 it appeared at the 60th Berlin International Film Festival where it won the Caligari Film Award and the Teddy Award for 'Best Documentary'.

== Synopsis ==
It follows an Italian man named Vincenzo Motta (also known as Enzo) who is serving a long sentence in a Genoa prison. He meets and falls in love with a trans woman named Mary Monaco who promises to wait for Enzo when she gets out of prison. When she is released, Mary finds a home for them to share, but in the meantime, she becomes addicted to heroin. According to a reporter for Metro, the film "straddles the line between documentary and drama".
