= Roberto De Paolis =

Italian filmmaker (born 1980)

- Born: 1980 (age 45–46); Rome, Italy
- Occupation: Film director

Roberto De Paolis (born in 1980) is an Italian film director, screenwriter and producer.

== Life and career ==
Born in Rome, De Paolis studied filmmaking at the London Film School, and later trained in acting under coach Beatrice Bracco. Active since 2003 as a fine art photographer and a video artist, he entered the film industry as an actor, appearing in a supporting role in the 2004 film Movimenti. After directing two short films which were both screened at the Venice Film Festival, Bassa Marea (2009) and Alice (2010), he co-founded with Carla Altieri the production company Young Films.

In 2017, De Paolis made his directorial feature debut with Pure Hearts, which premiered at the 70th Cannes Film Festival, in the Directors' Fortnight sidebar. The film got De Paolis a David di Donatello nomination for Best Directorial Debut and a Nastro d'Argento nomination for Best New Director. His following film, Princess, served as opener of the Horizons section at the 79th Venice International Film Festival. For this film De Paolis was nominated for the David di Donatello for Best Producer and for the Nastro d'Argento for Best Original Story.

== Selected filmography ==
=== Feature films ===
- Pure Hearts (2017)
- Princess (2022)
- Serpenti (2026)

=== Only Producer ===
- El paraíso (2023)
- Anywhere Anytime (2024)
