= The Invisible Boy: Second Generation =

2018 Italian fantasy-superhero film

- Il ragazzo invisibile: Seconda generazione
- Directed by: Gabriele Salvatores
- Written by: Alessandro Fabbri; Ludovica Rampoldi; Stefano Sardo
- Produced by: Carlotta Calori; Francesca Cima; Nicola Giuliano
- Starring: Ludovico Girardello; Galatea Bellugi; Kseniya Rappoport
- Cinematography: Italo Petriccione
- Edited by: Massimo Fiocchi
- Distributed by: Pathé
- Release date: 4 January 2018
- Running time: 100 minutes
- Country: Italy
- Language: Italian

The Invisible Boy: Second Generation (Italian: Il ragazzo invisibile: Seconda generazione) is a 2018 Italian fantasy-superhero film directed by Gabriele Salvatores. It is the sequel to the 2014 film The Invisible Boy.

== Plot ==
Three years after the events of the first film, Michele Silenzi's adoptive mother Giovanna has died in a car accident and Michele's love interest Stella – whose memories were mentally erased by Michele's father Andre – remembers nothing of what happened in the submarine and got engaged to Brando, who made her believe he was her savior.

In Michele's class comes a new girl, Natasha, who has a special elemental ability of pyrokinesis. During a party given at the home of Brando, Natasha lights up a fire to create a stir so as to be able to stun Michele, who wakes up in the bedroom of an abandoned noble house, and finds Natasha and a woman named Yelena, who reveals to him that the girl is his sister and that she is their mother. In the meantime, some Specials scattered around the world are kidnapped.

Yelena explains to Michele that she needs blood transfusions from him and Natasha in order to be able to reinforce since she is belonging to the typology of first-generation specials. Transfusions are performed by the Doctor KA, a doctor belonging to the "normal" who has worked with Yelena for some time; she tells her son that Andrey has been mysteriously kidnapped and is convinced that the abductor is the cruel Igor Zavarov, a Russian oligarch known to her as a bitter enemy and exploiter of the Specials. Yelena's plan is to help kidnap Zavarov with the help of Michele and Natasha in order to stop his campaign against the Specials and save Andrey. The kidnapping must be carried out while Zavarov is in Trieste for the inauguration of his new pipeline and Yelena entrusts Michele with the task of entering the offices of the police station and stealing the security plans for the day of the inauguration of the gas pipeline, discovering the exact movements of Zavarov. Through his invisibility, Michele succeeds very well in the task and makes his mother proud of him.

The family begins to know each other and love each other: the two siblings are confiding some of the key episodes of their lives lived in those years. Natasha says she was taken to Morocco and entrusted to a good woman, who later died. Her brother became the legal guardian of Natasha and began to mistreat her until he tried to take advantage of her. This until the girl discovered her power, just before being saved by her mother. One day Natasha is intrigued by a talisman spotted in a jewelry store; Michele uses his power to steal it for her and, together, deliver the jewel to their mother who, joyful to be re-forming her family, wears it saying that she would never take it off.

That night Yelena remembers the events following the flight with Andrey and the children. While the man had managed to save himself, Yelena had been captured again and locked up in an institute where, with the arrival of Zavarov, the experiments on Specials to try to understand the origin of their power became real torture. Only Doctor KA showed a certain respect for them but Zavarov did not care about their lives and when, during an experiment, Katia the elastic girl dies, Yelena tells Artiglio that it was time to unleash the rebellion. The Specials took the power of the fortress but they could not stop Zavarov who therefore saved himself on a helicopter. While most of the Specials decided to return to life by hiding their skills, Yelena wanted to find her children, with the help of Artiglio and Doctor KA.

Once the time for the inauguration of the gas pipeline has arrived, Yelena and Natasha tell Michele to say goodbye to anyone belonging to his past life and Michele goes to the gym where Stella and his friend Candela rehearse their last issue of artistic gymnastics, so as to see for the last time the girl he loved. As he is about to leave, the boy notices a man and a woman, Cinetica and Morpheus, stealing a wallet through her paranormal modalities and, recognizing them as Specials, the boy follows them. The two enter the villa where Michele lives with his mother and sister and follows them down to the basement, where a meeting is held in which there are Yelena, Natasha, Doctor KA and the Specials who had been kidnapped in Europe. Yelena, who is the leader of the group, exposes an extreme plan that shows how the tortures by Zavarov had made her so rebellious that she became even cruel: at the inauguration of the gas pipeline, the group will go to the warehouse where it is located the generator plant and pour inside it an explosive substance which will be driven by the intensity of the fire of Natasha and provoke a great explosion that will exterminate in addition to Zavarov even a large part of the population of Trieste. So it was Yelena who kidnapped the Specials so that they could use them as allies in that operation that will serve to destroy a good part of the normals that Zavarov belongs to and give the sign of the supremacy of the Specials over them. Michele now knows the truth and would like to warn the police but Natasha, bequeathed by Andrey, can hear her brother's thoughts and spots him out.

Michele is locked in the cell in the basement, reproaches his mother of not being able to act in the first person being too weak to do it, and Yelena gives him a bitter news: Doctor KA has managed to combine the DNA of Second Generation Specials of Natasha and Michele in a machine called UTERO, thanks to which Yelena and the Special allies have regained their full strength. That's why the mother so badly needed her children. Natasha, who had not had an acceptable life like that of Michele, is determined to follow her mother to the end, while the boy discovers that next to his cell is the one in which his father is locked up, kidnapped by his mother and segregated there for all the time as for not having approved the extreme rebellion of Yelena. Andrey, through the mental connection he has with his son, shows him the truth about what happened to Giovanna: Yelena killed her. After sneaking into Giovanna's car and having anaesthetized her, Yelena pushed the car and the policewoman off a cliff. Michele, by the anger and frustration of what was revealed to him, takes control of his mental power of manipulation of the molecules and destroys the walls of the cells.

Michele and Andrey reach the pipeline pumping station where Yelena and the team are about to start the plan. Natasha, supported by her mother, is preparing to strike the generator with fire, but Michele communicates telepathically with her and shows her the images of Giovanna's murder so as to make her aware of the unkempt, unreachable meadows of her mother. In tears, Natasha turns her disagreement over her mother, disappointed by her constant lies as a function of her goals. Yelena turns invisible and brings a burning wooden beam to the generator; Andrey finds and hears the thoughts of the woman, identifies her and starts to chase her. In the end, the two of them fall embraced against a blunt iron that protrudes from the floor, impaling both of them.

Michele has saved his friends and the city but also Zavarov, the three remaining Special helpers leave suggesting that they will continue their hunting of Zavarov alone. Michele confronts Stella, who has now figured out who saved her that night, and asks her to keep the secret. In front of their parents' bodies, Michele and Natasha hug each other. In the end, the brother and sister embrace on the back of a bus and Michele shows a normal child his power, and then ask him not to reveal it to anyone: he realizes, therefore, another relationship of trust between special and normal that his mother had not believed possible.

== Cast ==
- Ludovico Girardello as Michele Silenzi
- Galatea Bellugi as Natasha
- Kseniya Rappoport as Yelena
- Dario Cantarelli as Morfeo
- Katia Mironova as Cinetica
- Ivan Franěk as Andrey
- Kristof Konrad as Igor Zavarov
- Daniel Vivian as Lobanowski
- Emilio De Marchi as Doctor K.
- Mikolaj Chroboczek as Roccia
- Matej Martinak as Libellula
- Valeria Golino as Giovanna Silenzi
- Enea Barozzi as Brando Volpi
- Noa Zatta as Stella
- Assil Kandil as Candela
- Filippo Valese as Martino Breccia
- Riccardo Gasparini as Ivan Casadio

== Awards ==
=== David di Donatello Awards (2019) ===
- David di Donatello for Best Visual Effects to Victor Perez

=== Nastro d'Argento Awards (2018) ===
- Nastro "ArgentoVivo" cinema&ragazzi Award to Gabriele Salvatores
- Nomination for Nastro d'Argento for Best Producer to Indigo Film, Nicola Giuliano, Francesca Cima and Carlotta Calori
- Nomination for Nastro d'Argento for Best Production Design to Rita Rabassini
