= Ludovico Girardello =

Italian actor

Ludovico Girardello (born 5 December 2000 in Vittorio Veneto) is an Italian actor best known for his role of Michele Silenzi in The Invisible Boy movie series.
