= The Demons of St. Petersberg =

- Directed by: Giuliano Montaldo
- Starring: Miki Manojlović; Carolina Crescentini; Roberto Herlitzka; Anita Caprioli
- Cinematography: Arnaldo Catinari
- Music by: Ennio Morricone
- Release date: 24 April 2008
- Running time: 118 minutes
- Country: Italy
- Language: Italian

The Demons of St. Petersberg (Italian: I demoni di San Pietroburgo) is a 2008 Italian drama film directed by Giuliano Montaldo.

== Cast ==
- Miki Manojlović: Dostoevsky
- Carolina Crescentini: Anna
- Roberto Herlitzka: Pavlovic
- Anita Caprioli: Aleksandra
- Filippo Timi: Gusiev
- Patrizia Sacchi: Avdotja
- Sandra Ceccarelli: Natalja Ivanovna
