= Cover Boy =

2006 film by Carmine Amoroso

- Directed by: Carmine Amoroso
- Screenplay by: Carmine Amoroso; Gianfilippo Ascione
- Story by: Carmine Amoroso
- Produced by: Augusto Allegra; Giuliana Gamba; Arturo Paglia
- Starring: Eduard Gabia; Luca Lionello; Chiara Caselli
- Cinematography: Paolo Ferrari
- Edited by: Luca Manes
- Music by: Marco Falagiani
- Production companies: Filand; Paco Cinematografica
- Distributed by: Istituto Luce
- Release date: 2006
- Running time: 93 minutes
- Country: Italy
- Languages: Italian; Romanian

Cover Boy is a 2006 Italian drama film written and directed by Carmine Amoroso. It was presented at the first year of the Rome Film Festival in 2006.

== Plot ==
Ioan is a Romanian twentysomething whose father was a medic shot during the Romanian revolution, now surviving by doing chance work as a car mechanic. A friend of his convinces him to board a train to central Europe in the hope of getting to Italy to find a better paying job there, but his side of the trip comes to a halt when his passport is discovered to be fake during a stop in Germany. The two promise to meet again before Ioan's friend is taken away by the German officers.

Ioan arrives in Italy, but he is forced to lead a transient lifestyle as he can't find a job. He washes regularly in the janitors' washroom at Termini Station, where he has an altercation with a janitor, Michele. After some initial hostility towards Ioan, Michele decides to let him sleep in his apartment for cheap, and also finds him an illegal job as a mechanic in a scrapyard. The two eventually start bonding with each other, but tensions between them rise again when Ioan suspects Michele is hiding the fact that he got fired, which is indeed revealed to be true.

One day, Ioan notices his old Romanian friend in Rome, and the two share a meal at a bar. After receiving a phone call from his employer, Ioan's friend brings him to his workplace, showing him the tasks he is so handsomely paid for. The place is revealed to be a gay brothel, and Ioan leaves after refusing to help his friend in satisfying a customer. Ioan also ends up losing his mechanic job as he is forced to flee the scrapyard during a police control, the owner telling him there's nothing to be done upon him returning.

Things seem to get better for Ioan and Michele when the former finds a job as a model and buys a car thanks to a rich talent scout and photographer named Laura, and the latter is hired again to work as a janitor in another building in the city. However, Laura is revealed to be an exploitative ex-war photographer who still has an obsession with morbid side of her job, and Michele is fired again. Ioan is particularly offended by Laura using a naked photo she took of him for a brand's ad recalling the Romanian revolution (hence the title Cover Boy, the picture also being an extended version of the film's DVD release cover and poster), and storms out of the building where its presentation was taking place.

Driving in the middle of the night, Ioan phones Michele's landlady on his mobile asking her to tell him that he's finally coming home, but she doesn't take kindly the late call – tossing the phone away. Annoyed by the high volume of Michele's television, she leaves her room so she can tell him directly to turn it down. Upon reaching Michele's floor, she finds his door open and decides to investigate inside the apartment, the outcome not shown.

Some time later Ioan is driving to the Danube's delta, talking to Michele, who is in the passenger's seat. Michele asks him for the name of a cheese they ate on their way there, to which he responds saying it was telemea. Upon getting on the same barge his dad used to cross the Danube when he was a kid, Ioan tells Michele they will finally open the restaurant on the opposite side of the river; but as the camera pans around them Michele disappears – showing that he was just a figment of Ioan's imagination and implying that he did commit suicide. Ioan smiles as he gazes at the vegetation, leaving the viewer uncertain as to whether he's actually planning to open a restaurant in his home country with his late friend Michele's taught skills, or if he's just reminiscing about his Italian adventure.

== Cast ==
- Eduard Gabia as Ioan
- Luca Lionello as Michele
- Chiara Caselli as Laura
- Luciana Littizzetto as the landlady

== See also ==
- Movies about immigration to Italy
