= Aldo Signoretti =

Italian make-up artist

Aldo Signoretti (born 1953) is an Italian make-up artist. He has been nominated four times for the Academy Award for Best Makeup for Moulin Rouge! (2001), Apocalypto (2006), Il divo (2008) and Elvis (2022).
