= Mario's War =

- Directed by: Antonio Capuano
- Written by: Antonio Capuano
- Starring: Valeria Golino
- Cinematography: Luca Bigazzi
- Edited by: Giogiò Franchini
- Production companies: Fandango; Indigo Film
- Release dates: 11 August 2005 (Locarno Film Festival); 3 March 2006 (Italy)
- Running time: 100 minutes
- Country: Italy
- Language: Italian

Mario's War (Italian: La guerra di Mario) is a 2005 Italian drama film directed by Antonio Capuano. Valeria Golino won the 2006 David di Donatello for Best Actress for her performance as Giulia.

== Plot summary ==
A determined mother struggles to raise her adopted son with love and understanding as the disapproving eyes of her boyfriend and mother weigh heavily on her conscience.

== Cast ==
- Valeria Golino: Giulia
- Andrea Renzi: Sandro
- Anita Caprioli: Adriana Cutolo
- Rosaria De Cicco: Nunzia
- Nunzio Gallo
