= Il divo (film) =

2008 Italian film

- Theatrical release poster
- Directed by: Paolo Sorrentino
- Written by: Paolo Sorrentino
- Produced by: Francesca Cima; Fabio Conversi; Maurizio Coppolecchia; Nicola Giuliano; Andrea Occhipinti
- Starring: Toni Servillo; Anna Bonaiuto; Piera Degli Esposti; Paolo Graziosi; Giulio Bosetti; Flavio Bucci; Carlo Buccirosso
- Cinematography: Luca Bigazzi
- Edited by: Cristiano Travaglioli
- Music by: Teho Teardo
- Distributed by: Lucky Red
- Release dates: 23 May 2008 (Cannes Film Festival); 28 May 2008
- Running time: 110 minutes
- Countries: Italy; France
- Language: Italian
- Budget: $6.7 million
- Box office: $11,260,366

Il divo (Italian pronunciation: [il ˈdiːvo], The Celebrity or more literally The Divine, from Latin divus, "god") is a 2008 Italian biographical drama film directed by Paolo Sorrentino. It is based on the figure of former Italian Prime Minister Giulio Andreotti. It competed at the Cannes Film Festival in 2008, where it was awarded the Jury Prize. The film also screened at the Toronto International Film Festival and was nominated for the Oscar for Best Makeup at the 82nd Academy Awards in 2010.

== Synopsis ==
The film presents the story of Giulio Andreotti, a seven-time Prime Minister of Italy notorious for his alleged ties to the Mafia. The narration covers Andreotti's seventh election in 1992, his failed bid for the presidency of the Italian Republic, the Tangentopoli bribe scandal and his trial in 1995.

As the film opens, Giulio Andreotti gives an inner monologue observing how he has managed to survive his tumultuous political career while his various detractors have died. A montage shows the murders of various people connected to Andreotti, including journalist Mino Pecorelli, Carabinieri general Carlo Alberto Dalla Chiesa, bankers Michele Sindona and Roberto Calvi, and former Prime Minister Aldo Moro.

== Cast ==
- Toni Servillo as Giulio Andreotti
- Anna Bonaiuto as Livia Danese, Giulio Andreotti's wife
- Flavio Bucci as Franco Evangelisti
- Carlo Buccirosso as Paolo Cirino Pomicino
- Piera Degli Esposti as Mrs. Enea, Giulio Andreotti's secretary
- Alberto Cracco as Don Mario
- Giorgio Colangeli as Salvo Lima
- Massimo Popolizio as Vittorio Sbardella
- Aldo Ralli as Giuseppe Ciarrapico
- Giulio Bosetti as Eugenio Scalfari
- Gianfelice Imparato as Vincenzo Scotti
- Paolo Graziosi as Aldo Moro
- Lorenzo Gioielli as Mino Pecorelli
- Giovanni Vettorazzo as Magistrate Scarpinato
- Cristina Serafini as Caterina Stagno
- Achille Brugnini as Fiorenzo Angelini
- Pietro Biondi as Francesco Cossiga
- Fanny Ardant as French Ambassador's wife

== Soundtrack ==
Il Divo

Film score by Teho Teardo
- Released: 2008
- Genre: Film music
- Length: 64:21
- Label: Universal
- Producer: Teho Teardo

The film score for Il Divo was composed by Teho Teardo in 2008 and released on compact disc by Universal in Italy. The soundtrack has not been released locally in North America or the United Kingdom and is only available by import.

=== Track listing ===
1. Fissa lo sguardo – Teho Teardo
2. Sono ancora qui – Teho Teardo
3. I miei vecchi elettori – Teho Teardo
4. Toop Toop – Cassius
5. Che cosa ricordare di lei? – Teho Teardo
6. Un'altra battuta – Teho Teardo
7. Il cappotto che mi ha regalato Saddam – Teho Teardo
8. Notes for a New Religion – Teho Teardo
9. Gammelpop – Barbara Morgenstern & Robert Lippok
10. Non ho vizi minori – Teho Teardo
11. Ho fatto un fioretto – Teho Teardo
12. Possiedo un grande archivio – Teho Teardo
13. Double Kiss – Teho Teardo
14. Nux Vomica – The Veils
15. Il prontuario dei farmaci – Teho Teardo
16. La corrente – Teho Teardo
17. Flute concerto in D major (Il gardellino): Allegro – Antonio Vivaldi
18. Pavane, Op. 50 – Gabriel Fauré
19. Da, da, da, ich lieb' Dich nicht, Du liebst mich nicht – Trio
20. E la chiamano estate – Bruno Martino

The film features also:

- Pohjola's Daughter, Op. 49: Symphony n. 2 and Violin Concerto – Jean Sibelius
- Danse macabre, Op. 40 – Camille Saint-Saëns
- I migliori anni della nostra vita – Renato Zero
- Conceived – Beth Orton

== Themes ==
Andreotti's win as an incumbent Prime Minister reveals the theme of "particracy" (partitocrazia, or "rule by parties") in Italian politics, the rule of Italian politics being strongly influenced by a single dominant group of players who govern independent of the will of the voters. A new trend of populism rose in the politics of many European countries during the late 20th century, resulting in "a new breed of radical right-wing parties and movements" which gain majority favor through "charismatic leadership" and an appeal to "popular anxieties prejudices and resentments".

In the movie, Andreotti served as Prime Minister multiple terms; some argue that he and many other political actors in Italy utilize the so-called "soft populism", which employs outlets, such as media, to appeal to the popular masses. However, Andreotti does not seem to emphasize any specific policies nor even campaign.

Through the portrayal of Andreotti, the movie displays how political actors are able to maintain their position and power with little to no explanation as to how they did so. Also, the inability to completely distinguish whether Andreotti was or was not affiliated with the Mafia murders conveys the lack of clarity in the mechanics of Italy's government. Andreotti's incumbency reveals the pentapartito, which consisted of five parties ranging from centre-right to centre-left. This coalition formed to prevent a left majority and was able to secure a majority by strategic methods of give and take. By maintaining this system of taking turns, a "systematic corruption" formed where parties were no longer driven by the masses, but by their alignments, resulting in "exchanging resources".

== Critical reception ==
Il Divo received mostly positive reviews from critics. Il divo has an approval rating of 92% on review aggregator website Rotten Tomatoes, based on 50 reviews, and an average rating of 7.51/10. The website's critical consensus states, "While the web of corruption in this Italian political thriller can be hard for a non-native to follow, the visuals and the intrigue are compelling and thrilling in equal measure". It also has a score of 81 out of 100 on Metacritic, based on 17 critics, indicating "universal acclaim".

Peter Brunette of The Hollywood Reporter praised the movie, pointing out the capacity of entertaining, the brilliant acting and the quality of the soundtrack. He noted that the movie will probably not have a great success outside Italy. The same elements emerged from the review of Jay Weissberg from Variety, who defined the movie "a masterpiece" that "will become a touchstone for years to come". Stephen Holden of The New York Times, while acknowledging that "the shadowy relationships among politicians, the Mafia and the Vatican are difficult to decipher" to the American audience as most of the real-life characters are little known outside Italy, describes the filmmaking as "a tour de force of indelibly flashy imagery" and ranks the film "alongside the best of Martin Scorsese and Francis Ford Coppola".

Andreotti himself walked out of the movie and dismissed the film, stating that it was "too much" and that he would be, in the end, judged "on his record". Massimo Franco, a journalist and biographer of Andreotti, related that upon seeing the film "he was angry, calling it scurrilous". A few days later, Franco wrote that Andreotti joked cynically: "I'm happy for the producer. And I'd be even happier if I had a share of the takings."

== Accolades ==
Aldo Signoretti and Vittorio Sodano were nominated for Best Achievement in Makeup for the 82nd Academy Awards. The film was nominated for the Grand Prix of the Belgian Syndicate of Cinema Critics.

- Cannes Film Festival
  - Prix du Jury (Paolo Sorrentino)
  - Prix Vulcain (Luca Bigazzi and Angelo Raguseo)
- Sannio FilmFest
  - Premio "Capitello d'Oro" Migliore Attore (Carlo Buccirosso)
- Premio "Sonora", una Musica per il Cinema
  - Premio Migliore Colonna Sonora (Teho Teardo)
- Venice film festival
  - Premio "SIAE" alla Creatività 2008 (Paolo Sorrentino)
- Festival du Cinéma Italien d'Ajaccio
  - Prix Meilleur Acteur (Toni Servillo)
- Martini Premiere Award
  - Menzione Speciale per la Locandina
  - Premio "The Most Innovative Movie"
- Premio Internazionale Cinearti "La Chioma di Berenice"
  - Premio Migliore Arredamento (Alessandra Mura)
- European Film Awards
  - Best European Actor (Toni Servillo)
- Sevilla Festival de Cine:
  - Eurimages
- Tallinn Black Nights Film Festival
  - Best directors of photography (Luca Bigazzi)
- Jameson Dublin International Film Festival
  - Volta Award (Paolo Sorrentino)
- San Diego Film Critics Society Award
  - Best Foreign Language Film (Paolo Sorrentino)
