= Princess (2022 film) =

- Directed by: Roberto De Paolis
- Screenplay by: Roberto De Paolis
- Starring: Glory Kevin
- Cinematography: Claudio Cofrancesco
- Music by: Emanuele De Raymondi; Andrea De Sica
- Distributed by: Lucky Red
- Release date: 2022
- Language: Italian

Princess is a 2022 Italian drama film written and directed by Roberto De Paolis.

The film was selected as the opener of the Horizons section at the 79th edition of the Venice Film Festival.

== Plot ==
The everyday life of Princess, a Nigerian girl living illegally in Italy, who works as a prostitute in Ostia.

== Cast ==
- Glory Kevin as Princess
- Lino Musella as Corrado
- Salvatore Striano as The Taxi Driver
- Maurizio Lombardi as The Rich Client
- Sandra Osagie as Success

== Reception ==
On the review aggregator website Rotten Tomatoes, 67% of 6 critics' reviews are positive, with an average rating of 7.0/10. Screen International critic Lee Marshall described the film as "impressive" and argued that "the opening slot of Venice’s parallel Horizons sidebar feels like a consolation prize for a film that would not have looked out of place in Competition".
