= The Invisible Boy (2014 film) =

- Italian: Il ragazzo invisibile
- Directed by: Gabriele Salvatores
- Written by: Alessandro Fabbri; Ludovica Rampoldi; Stefano Sardo
- Produced by: Carlotta Calori; Francesca Cima; Nicola Giuliano
- Starring: Ludovico Girardello; Valeria Golino; Fabrizio Bentivoglio
- Cinematography: Italo Petriccione
- Edited by: Massimo Fiocchi
- Music by: Federico de' Robertis; Ezio Bosso; Luca Benedetto; Marialuna Cipolla; Carillon
- Distributed by: Pathé
- Release date: December 1, 2014 (Lucca Movies e Cosplay)
- Running time: 100 minutes
- Country: Italy
- Language: Italian
- Box office: €5,216,102 (Italy)

The Invisible Boy (Italian: Il ragazzo invisibile) is a 2014 Italian fantasy-superhero film directed by Gabriele Salvatores.

== Plot ==
Michele Silenzi is a shy thirteen-year-old boy from Trieste who lives with his single mother (a local police inspector). He is often overlooked at school, and is picked on regularly by the school bullies. He wants to attend a fancy-dress party, because the object of his desires, classmate Clyde, is going. Unfortunately, the fifty-Euro note he was to use to buy a superhero costume is stolen by the bullies. He has to settle instead for a much cheaper costume, which he is told belongs to an obscure Chinese superhero who has mystical powers.

At the party, the bullies embarrass Michele by showing Clyde that he has been secretly filming her on his phone. Mortified, Michele makes his escape into the night, but not before wishing the costume would make him invisible. He later discovers his wish has come true. At first he uses his power to get back at his bullies (and to spy on his female classmates in their underwear in the changing room).

It becomes apparent that children at the school are going missing, and eventually Stella is kidnapped too. Eventually a mysterious blind man tells Michele that he is his father, and that both he and Michele are members of a secret Russian group called The Specials. All members of this group have superpowers, and the kidnapping of the children is an attempt by The Specials to track Michele down.

By now Michele can control his invisibility, and after escaping the leader of the Specials he helps free the children; his father then mentally wipes everyone's memory.

The film ends with the revelation that the leader of the Specials is actually Michele's birth mother. The final scene shows her being informed that, although they have failed to recruit Michele, they have located his long-lost twin sister in Morocco.

== Cast ==
- Ludovico Girardello as Michele Silenzi
- Valeria Golino as Giovanna Silenzi
- Fabrizio Bentivoglio as Basili
- Alexis Adams as Clydelene "Clyde"
- Hristo Zhivkov as Andreij
- Kseniya Rappoport as Yelena
- Assil Kandil as Candela
- Vernon Dobtcheff as Artiglio
- Filippo Valese: Martino Breccia
- Enea Barozzi: Brando Volpi
- Riccardo Gasparini: Ivan Casadio
- Vilius Tumalavicius: Biondo
- Diana Hobel: as Siani
- Vincenzo Zampa: Luigi Minnella
- Maria Sole Mansutti: madre di Stella

== Sequel ==
A sequel titled The Invisible Boy: Second Generation (Il ragazzo invisibile - Seconda generazione) was released in January 2018.

== See also ==
- List of Italian films of 2014
