= Pirotta =

Pirotta and Pirrotta are Italian surnames. Notable people with these names include:

== Pirotta ==
- Angelo Pirotta (1894–1956), Maltese philosopher
- Luigi Pirotta (1900–1971), Italian archivist and chief scout
- Pietro Romualdo Pirotta (1853–1936), Italian botanist
- Saviour Pirotta (born 1958), Maltese-born British author and playwright
- Vanessa Pirotta, Australian wildlife scientist

== Pirrotta ==
- Nino Pirrotta (1908–1998), Italian musicologist
- Vincenzo Pirrotta (born 1942), Italian-born American biologist
