= 71st David di Donatello =

Italian film award ceremony

- Date: 6 May 2026
- Site: Cinecittà, Rome, Italy
- Hosted by: Bianca Balti; Flavio Insinna
- Organized by: Accademia del Cinema Italiano

Highlights
- Best Picture: The Last One for the Road
- Most awards: The Last One for the Road (8)
- Most nominations: The Last One for the Road (16)

Television coverage
- Network: Rai 1

The 71st David di Donatello ceremony, presented by the Accademia del Cinema Italiano, was held on 6 May 2026 at Cinecittà Studios in Rome, and was hosted by Flavio Insinna and Bianca Balti.

== Winners and nominees ==
All nominees are listed below, and the winners are listed in bold.

**Best Film**: **The Last One for the Road**; directed by Francesco Sossai; The Tasters; directed by Silvio Soldini; Five Seconds; directed by Paolo Virzì; Fuori; directed by Mario Martone; La grazia; directed by Paolo Sorrentino	**Best Director**: **Francesco Sossai** – The Last One for the Road; Gabriele Mainetti – Forbidden City; Mario Martone – Fuori; Silvio Soldini – The Tasters; Paolo Sorrentino – La grazia
**Best Directorial Debut**: **Margherita Spampinato** – Sweetheart; Alissa Jung – Paternal Leave; Alberto Palmiero – Tienimi presente; Ludovica Rampoldi – A Brief Affair; Greta Scarano – Siblings	**Best Original Screenplay**: **Francesco Sossai, Adriano Candiago** – The Last One for the Road; Francesco Bruni, Carlo Virzì, Paolo Virzì – Five Seconds; Letizia Russo, Guido Silei, Pietro Marcello – Duse; Paolo Sorrentino – La grazia; Margherita Spampinato – Sweetheart
**Best Adapted Screenplay**: **Doriana Leondeff, Silvio Soldini, Lucio Ricca, Cristina Comencini, Giulia Calenda, Ilaria Macchia** – The Tasters; Vincenzo Alfieri, Giuseppe G. Stasi – 40 secondi; Leonardo Di Costanzo, Bruno Oliviero, Valia Santella – Elisa; Mario Martone, Ippolita Di Majo – Fuori; Ludovica Rampoldi – Primavera	**Best Producer**: **Marta Donzelli, Gregorio Paonessa (Vivo Film) in collaboration with Philipp Kreuzer (Maze Pictures), Cecilia Trautvetter** – The Last One for the Road; Lionello Cerri, Cristiana Mainardi (Lumière & Co.); in collaboration with Joseph Rouschop (Tarantula); Katrin Renz, Stefan Jäger (Tellfilm) – The Tasters; Carlo Degli Esposti, Nicola Serra, Marco Grifoni (Palomar), Benedetta Cappon (Avventurosa) in collaboration with Alexandra Henochsberg, Pierre-François Piet (Ad Vitam Films) – Duse; Benedetta Scagnelli, Alessio Pasqua, Gianluca Arcopinto, Claudio Cofrancesco (Yagi Media); in collaboration with Paolo Butini, Ivan Caso, Filippo Barracco – Sweetheart; Andrea Occhipinti (Lucky Red), Marco Alessi (Dugong Films); in collaboration with Beatrice Bulgari (Eolo Film Productions) – Bravo Bene!
**Best Actress**: **Aurora Quattrocchi** – Sweetheart; Valeria Bruni Tedeschi – Duse; Anna Ferzetti – La grazia; Valeria Golino – Fuori; Tecla Insolia – Primavera; Barbara Ronchi – Elisa	**Best Actor**: **Sergio Romano** – The Last One for the Road; Pierpaolo Capovilla – The Last One for the Road; Valerio Mastandrea – Five Seconds; Claudio Santamaria – Il nibbio; Toni Servillo – La grazia
**Best Supporting Actress**: **Matilda De Angelis** – Fuori; Valeria Golino – A Brief Affair; Valeria Bruni Tedeschi – Five Seconds; Silvia D'Amico – Three Goodbyes; Milvia Marigliano – La grazia; Barbara Ronchi – Diva Futura	**Best Supporting Actor**: **Lino Musella** – Feeling Better; Roberto Citran – The Last One for the Road; Francesco Gheghi – 40 secondi; Vinicio Marchioni – Tired of Killing: Autobiography of an Assassin; Andrea Pennacchi – The Last One for the Road; Fausto Russo Alesi – Duse
**Best Casting**: **Adriano Candiago** – The Last One for the Road; Marco Matteo Donat-Cattin, Federica Baglioni – 40 secondi; Laura Muccino, Liza Stutzky – The Tasters; Anna Maria Sambucco, Massimo Appolloni – La grazia; Margherita Spampinato, Giulia Tarquini – Sweetheart	**Best Cinematography**: **Paolo Carnera** – Forbidden City; Renato Berta – The Tasters; Daria D'Antonio – La grazia; Marco Graziaplena – Duse; Massimiliano Kuveiller – The Last One for the Road
**Best Composer**: **Fabio Massimo Capogrosso** – Primavera; Franco Amurri – Forbidden City; Krano – The Last One for the Road; Mauro Pagani – The Tasters; Trent Reznor, Atticus Ross – Queer	**Best Original Song**: **"Ti" – Marco Spigariol (Krano) from The Last One for the Road**; "Arrivederci tristezza" – Brunori Sas from Arrivederci tristezza; "La prostata enflamada" – Luca Medici (Checco Zalone), Antonio Iammarino from Buen Camino; "Follemente" – Claudia Lagona (Levante) from Madly; "Vaster than Empires" – Trent Reznor, Atticus Ross, William Burroughs, Caetano Veloso from Queer
**Production Design**: **Andrea Castorina**, **Marco Martucci** – Forbidden City; Paula Muthen, Emilia Bonsembiante – The Last One for the Road; Paola Bizzarri, Igor Gabriel – The Tasters; Gaspare De Pascali, Carlotta Desmann – Duse; Ludovica Ferrario, Laura Casalini – La grazia	**Best Costumes**: **Maria Rita Barbera, Gaia Calderone** – Primavera; Susanna Mastroianni – Forbidden City; Ursula Patzak – Duse; Carlo Poggioli – La grazia; Marina Roberti – The Tasters
**Best Make-up**: **Esmé Sciaroni** – The Tasters; Maurizio Fazzini – Duse; Paola Gattabrusi – La grazia; Vincenzo Mastrantonio, Adele Di Trani, Emanuele De Luca – Primavera; Fernanda Perez, Jason Hamer – Queer	**Best Hairstyling**: **Marta Iacoponi** – Primavera; Teresa Di Serio – My Tennis Maestro; Massimo Gattabrusi – Queer; Samankta Mura – The Tasters; Marco Perna – Fuori
**Best Editing**: **Paolo Cottignola** – The Last One for the Road; Vincenzo Alfieri – 40 secondi; Francesco Di Stefano – Forbidden City; Giogiò Franchini – My Tennis Maestro; Jacopo Quadri – Fuori; Cristiano Travaglioli – La grazia	**Best Sound**: **Gianluca Scarlata, Davide Favargiotti, Daniele Quadroli, Nadia Paone** – Primavera; Angelo Bonanni, Giulio Previ, Mirko Perri, Michele Mazzucco – Forbidden City; Maricetta Lombardo, Silvia Moreas, Piergiorgio De Luca, Giancarlo Rutigliano – Fuori; Antoine Vandendriessche, Daniela Bassan, Stefano Grosso, Giancarlo Rutigliano – The Tasters; Marco Zambrano, Francesco Mauro, Sebastian Pablo Poloni, Francesco Tumminello – The Last One for the Road
**Best Visual Effects**: **Stefano Leoni, Andrea Lo Priore** – Forbidden City; Gaia Bussolati, Enrico Bernocchi – The Return; Marco Fiorani Parenzi, Virginia Cefaly – Queer; Rodolfo Migliari, Lena Di Gennaro – La grazia; Giuseppe Squillaci, Daniele Mischianti – The Holy Boy	**Best Documentary**: **Roberto Rossellini - Più di una vita** by Ilaria De Laurentiis, Andrea Paolo Massara, Raffaele Brunetti; Bobò by Pippo Delbono; Ferdinando Scianna - Il fotografo dell'ombra by Roberto Andò; Below the Clouds by Gianfranco Rosi; Toni, mio padre by Anna Negri
**Best Short Film**: **Everyday in Gaza** by Omar Rammal; Astronauta by Giorgio Giampà; Ciao, Varsavia by Diletta Di Nicolantonio; Festa in famiglia by Nadir Taji; Tempi supplementari by Matteo Memè	**Best International Film**: **One Battle After Another**; The Brutalist; I'm Still Here; It Was Just an Accident; The Voice of Hind Rajab
**Young David**: **The Tasters** by Silvio Soldini; 40 secondi by Vincenzo Alfieri; La grazia by Paolo Sorrentino; The Last One for the Road by Francesco Sossai; Per te by Alessandro Aronadio
