= Onorina Tomasin-Brion =

Italian entrepreneur, co-founder of Brionvega (1919–2002)

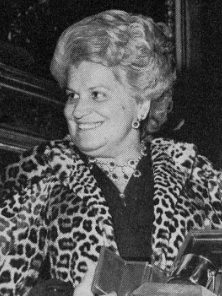
- Tomasin-Brion in 1972
- Born: 1919; Santa Giustina in Colle, Kingdom of Italy
- Died: 2002 (aged 82–83); Milan, Italy
- Resting place: San Vito d'Altivole
- Monuments: Brion tomb
- Spouse: Giuseppe Brion (m. 1939; died 1968)
- Children: 2
- Awards: Cavaliere del Lavoro (1972)

Onorina "Rina" Tomasin-Brion (1919–2002) was an Italian entrepreneur and business manager. She was also one of the first women to be awarded the Cavaliere del Lavoro, in 1972.

== Early life ==
She was born in Santa Giustina in Colle, in the Province of Padua, in 1919, into a family of merchants from the town who owned a haberdashery. In 1939, during a train journey to Castelfranco Veneto, she met Giuseppe Brion, a RadioMarelli worker, whom she married in the same year and moved to Milan.

== Career ==
In 1945, together with her husband and the engineer Leone Pajetta, she founded BP Radio (later Brionvega), a company specialized in the production of electronic and electrical components for radios, as well as complete radio sets with the Vega brand. Tomasin dealt with the marketing of the products, but after the sudden death of her husband in 1968, she took over the management together with her son Ennio, and he succeeded in the offices of president and chief executive officer.

The radios and televisions produced by Brionvega, had great commercial success all over the world and became known for their particular design. The best designers of the time worked there such as Marco Zanuso, Richard Sapper, the brothers Achille, Livio, and Pier Giacomo Castiglioni, Mario Bellini and Franco Albini. Under her management, the company continued its path of growth and expansion throughout the 1970s.

== Awards ==
Tomasin-Brion received awards such as the Cavaliere del Lavoro (1972), the Dalla Gavetta Award (1973), the Umberto Biancamano National Award, and the Ambrogino d'oro (1981). She was a director of the Banca Cattolica del Veneto and vice president of the Lombard section of the National Federation of the Knights of Labour.

== Personal Life and death ==
From her marriage to Giuseppe Brion she had two children, Ennio and Donatella.

She died in Milan in 2002, and is buried together with her husband in the Carlo Scarpa designed Brion family tomb in San Vito d'Altivole cemetery.
