= The Last One for the Road =

2025 film by Francesco Sossai

- Italian theatrical release poster
- Italian: Le città di pianura
- Directed by: Francesco Sossai
- Written by: Francesco Sossai; Adriano Candiago
- Produced by: Marta Donzelli; Gregorio Paonessa; Philipp Kreuzer; Cecilia Trautvetter
- Starring: Filippo Scotti; Sergio Romano; Pierpaolo Capovilla; Roberto Citran; Andrea Pennacchi
- Cinematography: Massimiliano Kuveiller
- Edited by: Paolo Cottignola
- Music by: Krano
- Production companies: Vivo Film; Maze Pictures; Rai Cinema
- Distributed by: Lucky Red
- Release dates: 21 May 2025 (Cannes); 25 September 2025 (Italy)
- Running time: 101 minutes
- Countries: Italy; Germany
- Box office: $3 million

The Last One for the Road (Italian: Le città di pianura, lit. 'The cities of the plain') is a 2025 drama road movie co-written and directed by Francesco Sossai. It stars Filippo Scotti, Sergio Romano, Pierpaolo Capovilla, Roberto Citran, and Andrea Pennacchi.

The film had its world premiere at the Un Certain Regard section of the 78th Cannes Film Festival on 21 May 2025. It was released in cinemas in Italy on 25 September 2025 by Lucky Red, to wide audience acclaim. It won Best Film at the 71st David di Donatello, along with other seven awards, including Best Director, Best Original Screenplay, and Best Actor (Romano).

== Plot ==
Carlobianchi and Doriano are two broke men in their fifties obsessed with the constant search for the hair of the dog (which in the Veneto region is called "l'ultimo" or "l'ultima"), while awaiting the arrival the next day of their friend Genio, returning to Italy after fleeing to Argentina before the 2008 financial crisis. Still searching for one last drink, they decide to travel to Venice during the night to drink there directly.

During the journey they meet Giulio, a shy architecture student, who is celebrating the graduation of his friend Giulia with others, a woman with whom he is secretly in love. Carlobianchi and Doriano join the group, and Giulio reluctantly follows them. Later Giulio decides to split from the group, and the two men follow him, offering to drive him back to Mestre.

The following morning Giulio wakes up and finds himself in Treviso, and it turns out that Carlobianchi went to the wrong airport and that Genio landed in Venice; resigned, Giulio decides to follow them in search of the restaurant where the two used to go often with Genio. Once there, now abandoned, Carlobianchi and Doriano reveal why Genio fled: the three, always inseparably bound together, had worked in an eyewear factory during the 2000s, where they had begun illegally selling production scraps, eventually building a business worth hundreds of thousands of euros. Once discovered, Genio fled to Argentina, burying his share of the money in a secret countryside location, while Carlobianchi and Doriano squandered their share over the years (for example, Carlobianchi bought his Jaguar S-Type), during which time the factory also shut down and Carlobianchi had to separate from his wife and move back in with his parents.

As the journey through the Venetian countryside continues, Giulio, initially irritated, gradually opens up and becomes increasingly in tune with Carlobianchi and Doriano, joining them in their continuous drinking. In the afternoon they arrive in front of an old villa, and the owner mistakes them for surveyors he had been expecting and welcomes them inside. Thanks to Giulio’s architectural knowledge, the three manage to keep up the charade, getting both alcohol and reimbursement for the travel expenses, which Carlobianchi obtains by seducing the owner.

That evening the three accidentally meet Genio: Carlobianchi and Doriano greet him enthusiastically, but the man treats them with indifference and leaves. Later they return to drinking again and decide to search for the money buried by Genio: they go to his house and find the coordinates of the place, where they discover their old friend also trying to recover the money, but unfortunately a construction site had been built over the burial spot and later left unfinished, so the money has been lost. The trio gets drunk again and then goes to sleep at Carlobianchi’s parents’ house.

The following morning Giulio decides to call Giulia and ask her if he can join her in Verona. She agrees, and Carlobianchi and Doriano offer to drive him to the nearest train station, but first they fulfill Giulio’s wish by visiting the Brion Memorial. Once at the station, Giulio bids his companions a warm farewell, and as the train departs Carlobianchi and Doriano follow it by car, waving goodbye to him euphorically.

== Cast ==
- Filippo Scotti as Giulio
- Sergio Romano as Carlobianchi
- Pierpaolo Capovilla as Doriano
- Roberto Citran as Cavalier Fadìga
- Andrea Pennacchi as Genio

== Production ==
Principal photography took place in late 2024. The film was shot on location in Veneto, specifically Sedico, Feltre, Padua, Chioggia, and the Brion Memorial in Altivole.

== Release ==
Lucky Number owns the sales rights to the film. The film had its world premiere in the Un Certain Regard section of the 78th Cannes Film Festival on 21 May 2025. It was screened at the 2025 Toronto International Film Festival, the 2025 New York Film Festival, the Festival du nouveau cinéma, and the Vancouver International Film Festival. Distributed by Lucky Red, the film was released in cinemas in Italy on 25 September 2025.

== Reception ==
The critic Alberto Crespi in La Repubblica writes that "between idlers, nights out and a buried treasure, the director from Belluno signs a deeply local and surprisingly universal film", while in Sentieri selvaggi Aldo Spiniello comments that "the alcoholic journey of the protagonists has a ramshackle trajectory, much like the film, which seems to come from the 90s yet manages to capture a whole world".

Nell Minow on RogerEbert.com writes that the film, ostensibly a boozy car journey, is "an existential story", a "more scenic version of Samuel Beckett's Waiting for Godot". She calls Massimiliano Kuveiller's cinematography "excellent" and comments that Krano's "country/rock/soul" music "suits the film's bittersweet tone well." Among the film's surprises, she writes, is a "discussion of the economic principle of diminishing marginal utility."

== Awards ==
The film won eight David di Donatello awards.
