= Aurora Quattrocchi =

Italian actress (born 1943)

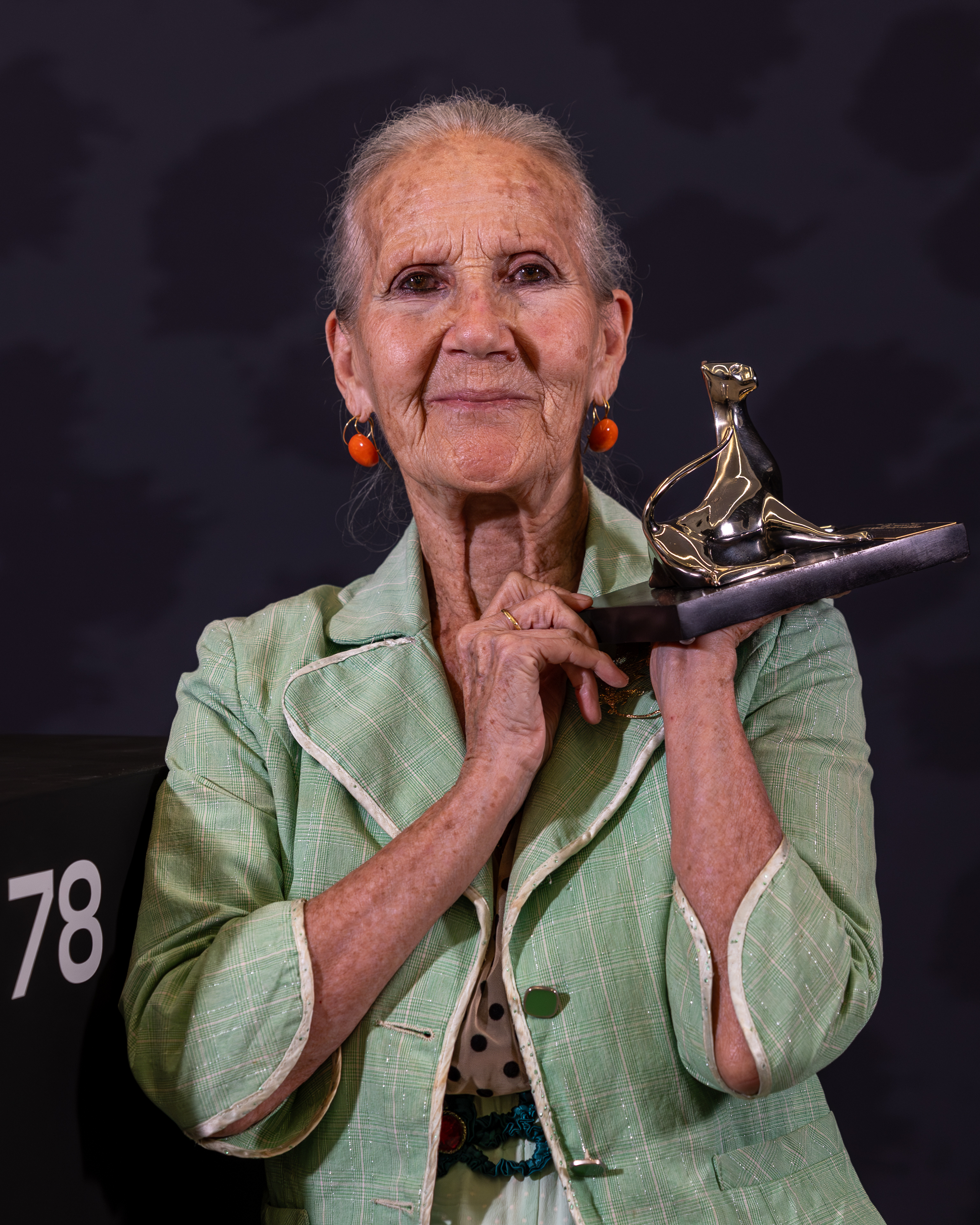
- Quattrocchi at the 78th Locarno Film Festival (2025)
- Born: 18 March 1943 (age 83); Matulji, Province of Fiume, Italy
- Occupation: Actress

Aurora "Rori" Quattrocchi (born 18 March 1943) is an Italian television, stage and film actress.

== Life and career ==
Born in Matulji (at the time part of the Kingdom of Italy with the name Mattuglie) where her Sicilian father was serving as an army officer, at 5 years old Quattrocchi lost her mother and went to live in Palermo with her aunt and uncle. She started her career on stage in the 1970s, and made her film debut in 1989, in Marco Risi's Forever Mary.

Among Quattrocchi's best known roles, there are Fortunata in Golden Door, which got her a Chlotrudis Award nomination, and the mother in Nostalgia, for which Quattrocchi got David di Donatello and Nastro d'Argento nominations as best supporting actress. Quattrocchi was awarded the International Starlight Cinema Award for her career at the 79th Venice International Film Festival.

In 2025, she received the Leopard for Best Performance at the 78th Locarno Film Festival for Margherita Spampinato's Sweetheart.

On 6 May 2026, she won the David di Donatello for Best Actress for Margherita Spampinato's Sweetheart.

== Selected filmography ==
- Forever Mary directed by Marco Risi (1989)
- Boys on the Outside, directed by Marco Risi (1990)
- The Rebel, directed by Aurelio Grimaldi (1993)
- The Star Maker, directed by Giuseppe Tornatore (1995)
- One Hundred Steps, directed by Marco Tullio Giordana (2000)
- Malèna, directed by Giuseppe Tornatore (2000)
- The Council of Egypt, directed by Emidio Greco (2002)
- Un día de suerte, directed by Sandra Gugliotta (2002)
- Nati stanchi, directed by Dominick Tambasco (2002)
- Secret File, directed by Paolo Benvenuti (2003)
- Golden Door, directed by Emanuele Crialese (2006)
- Wild Blood, directed by Marco Tullio Giordana (2008)
- La fidanzata di papà, directed by Enrico Oldoini (2008)
- Palermo Shooting, directed by Wim Wenders (2008)
- Purple Sea, directed by Donatella Maiorca (2009)
- The Trick in the Sheet, directed by Alfonso Arau (2010)
- Scossa (segment: Speranza), directed by Carlo Lizzani (2011)
- It Was the Son, directed by Daniele Ciprì (2012)
- Amiche da morire, directed by Giorgia Farina (2013)
- Black Souls, directed by Francesco Munzi (2014)
- At War with Love, directed by Pif (2016)
- Friends by Chance, directed by Francesco Bruni (2017)
- Cetto c'è, senzadubbiamente, directed by Giulio Manfredonia (2019)
- Cruel Peter, directed by Christian Bisceglia and Ascanio Malgarini (2019)
- Nostalgia, directed by Mario Martone (2022)
- L'immensità, directed by Emanuele Crialese (2022)
- Strangeness, directed by Roberto Andò (2022)
- The Bone Breakers, directed by Vincenzo Pirrotta (2022)
- The Illusion, directed by Roberto Andò (2025)
- Memories of the Future, directed by Vanessa Ly (2025)
- Sweetheart, directed by Margherita Spampinato (2025)
- Homo Argentum, directed by Gastón Duprat & Mariano Cohn (2025)
- Illusione, directed by Francesca Archibugi (2025)
