= The Forbidden City (2025 film) =

2025 Italian kung fu drama film

- Theatrical release poster
- Italian: La città proibita
- Directed by: Gabriele Mainetti
- Written by: Stefano Bises; Gabriele Mainetti; Davide Serino
- Produced by: Mario Gianani; Lorenzo Gangarossa; Sonia Rovai
- Starring: Enrico Borello; Yaxi Liu; Marco Giallini; Sabrina Ferilli; Chunyu Shanshan; Luca Zingaretti
- Cinematography: Paolo Carnera
- Edited by: Francesco Di Stefano
- Music by: Fabio Amurri
- Production companies: Wildside; Goon Films; Piper Film
- Distributed by: PiperFilm
- Release date: 13 March 2025
- Running time: 138 minutes
- Country: Italy
- Languages: Italian; Mandarin
- Budget: €16.9 million

The Forbidden City (Italian: La città proibita) is a 2025 Italian martial arts film directed by Gabriele Mainetti, and starring Enrico Borello, Yaxi Liu, Marco Giallini, Sabrina Ferilli, Chunyu Shanshan, and Luca Zingaretti.

The film was released on 13 March 2025. It has been nominated in seven categories at the 71st David di Donatello Awards, including for Best Director.

== Plot ==
1995. Yun and Mei are two sisters born in China during the one-child policy period, which lasted from 1979 to 2015. To protect Mei, their parents decide to keep her presence a secret and raise the girls with martial arts training.

In the present day, Mei arrives in Rome to find her sister Yun. In the Esquilino Chinatown neighborhood, she finds the restaurant "La città proibita", run by the Chinese boss Wang, which is a place of prostitution and illegal dealings. Mei confronts Wang's men in an attempt to find her sister, possibly held prisoner for sexual exploitation. She discovers that Yun is no longer there and that she might be connected to Alfredo, the owner of a nearby trattoria. Mei then goes to the "Da Alfredo" trattoria and assaults his son, Marcello, who runs the place with his mother Lorena since his father disappeared. Marcello claims he knows nothing about his father Alfredo, as he is said to have run away with a Chinese prostitute.

Later, Marcello tells everything to Annibale, a small neighborhood gangster who exploits illegal immigrants, his creditor and partner, as well as Alfredo's best friend. Annibale suspects Wang, from the rival restaurant, is behind the attack on the trattoria, and threatens him with severe retaliation. He then sends his henchmen Cip and Cioppe to find Mei, but she manages to overcome them. Mei captures one of Wang's associates, who reveals that both Yun and Alfredo are actually dead. Mei and Marcello are taken to the grave, causing them great shock.

After risking her life by boldly attacking Wang's restaurant, Mei realizes that Marcello is not involved in the murder and begins to bond with him. The two develop a connection, and after a Vespa ride through the streets of Rome, they kiss. Mei tells Marcello that Yun had come to Italy to work and earn money to pay the fine that would finally allow her to be recognized in China.

The tension culminates in a confrontation between Mei and Wang, during which she seriously wounds him. Before dying, Wang reveals that Alfredo wanted to run away with Yun but didn't have enough money and was willing to sell him the trattoria. Annibale, intervening, had shot Alfredo just before he signed the deal. Wang had killed Yun after witnessing Alfredo's death.

Marcello confronts Annibale, who realizes he has lost everything and commits suicide. Lorena becomes the owner of the trattoria, while Mei and Marcello move to China, where they live with their children, dedicating themselves to teaching martial arts and cooking.

== Cast ==
- Enrico Borello as Marcello
- Yaxi Liu as Xiao Mei
- Marco Giallini as Annibale
- Sabrina Ferilli as Lorena
- Chunyu Shanshan as Mr. Wang
- Luca Zingaretti as Alfredo
- Tomal Islam as Śānti
- Haijin Ye as Xiao Yun
- Claudio Pallitto as Cip
- Daniele Mosca as Cioppe
- Sheena Hao as the Chinese maitresse
- Seck Abdoulaye as Malik
- Paolo Buglioni as the waiter at Alfredo's
- Dan Ke as Mr. Wang's interpreter
- Xu Guo Qiang as Mr. Zhang
- Elisa Wong as Mei and Yun's mother
- Jia Yimin as Mei and Yun's father
- Roberto He as Maggio
- Stefano Tancredi as Tanca
- Francesca Fiume as Xin
- Yingyi Liu as Maylin
- Philippe Guastella as Lino

== Release ==
The film was distributed domestically in Italy by PiperFilm. Originally set to be released in Italy in late 2024, the date was rescheduled for a theatrical release on 13 March 2025. in July 2025, Well Go USA acquired the American rights of the film. It was also in the territories of Germany, Austria, and Switzerland (DCM Film Distribution), Japan (IPA), India and the Indian South Continent (Viswass), Taiwan (Eagle International), Russia and CIS countries (Nashe Kino), Czechia and Slovakia (Vapet) and Bulgaria (Beta Film).

In the United States, it received a digital release on 17 March 2026, and is set for a physical release on DVD, Blu-ray and Ultra HD Blu-ray on 21 April 2026.

== Accolades ==
Year	Award	Category	Nominee(s)	Result	Ref.
2025	Nastri d'Argento	Best Film	Forbidden City	Nominated	
2025	Nastri d'Argento	Best Director	Gabriele Mainetti	Won	
2025	Nastri d'Argento	Best Supporting Actress	Sabrina Ferilli	Nominated	
2025	Nastri d'Argento	Best Cinematography	Paolo Carnera	Nominated	
2025	Nastri d'Argento	Best Production Design	Andrea Castorina	Nominated	
2025	Nastri d'Argento	Best Editing	Francesco Di Stefano	Nominated	
2025	Nastri d'Argento	Best Sound	Angelo Bonanni	Won	
2025	Nastri d'Argento	Best Score	Fabio Amurri	Nominated	
2025	Globi d'Oro	Best Film	Forbidden City	Nominated	
2025	Globi d'Oro	Best Director	Gabriele Mainetti	Won	
2025	Globi d'Oro	Best Original Screenplay	Gabriele Mainetti, Stefano Bises, Davide Serino	Nominated	
2025	Globi d'Oro	Best Cinematography	Paolo Carnera	Nominated	
2025	Globi d'Oro	Best Score	Fabio Amurri	Nominated	
2025	Premio Flaiano	Outstanging Direction	Gabriele Mainetti	Won	
2026	David di Donatello	Best Director	Gabriele Mainetti	Nominated	
2026	David di Donatello	Best Score	Franco Amurri	Nominated	
2026	David di Donatello	Best Production Design	Andrea Castorina, Marco Martucci	Won	
2026	David di Donatello	Best Costumes	Susanna Mastroianni	Nominated	
2026	David di Donatello	Best Editing	Francesco Di Stefano	Nominated	
2026	David di Donatello	Best Cinematography	Paolo Carnera	Won	
2026	David di Donatello	Best Sound	Angelo Bonanni, Giulio Previ, Mirko Perri, Michele Mazzucco	Nominated	
2026	David di Donatello	Best Visual Effects	Stefano Leoni, Andrea Lo Priore	Won	
