= The Tasters =

2025 film

- Italian theatrical release poster
- Directed by: Silvio Soldini
- Screenplay by: Doriana Leondeff; Silvio Soldini; Lucio Ricca; Cristina Comencini; Giulia Calenda; Ilaria Macchia
- Based on: Le assaggiatrici by Rosella Postorino and Margot Wölk's life
- Produced by: Lionello Cerri; Cristiana Mainardi; Joseph Rouschop; Katrin Renz; Stefan Jäger
- Starring: Elisa Schlott; Max Riemelt
- Cinematography: Renato Berta
- Edited by: Carlotta Cristiani; Giorgio Garini
- Music by: Mauro Pagani
- Production companies: Lumière & Co.; Anteo; Tarantula; Tellfilm; Vision Distribution; Sky Cinema
- Distributed by: Vision Distribution (Italy); Paradiso Films (Belgium); Morandini Film Distribution (Switzerland)
- Release dates: 27 March 2025 (Italy); 12 June 2025 (Switzerland); 27 August 2025 (Belgium)
- Running time: 123 minutes
- Countries: Italy; Belgium; Switzerland
- Language: German

The Tasters (Italian: Le assaggiatrici) is a 2025 historical drama film co-written and directed by Silvio Soldini. A co-production between Italy, Belgium, and Switzerland, it stars Elisa Schlott and Max Riemelt.

== Plot ==
Autumn 1943. While her husband is serving at the front, Rosa Sauer has fled bomb-stricken Berlin and taken refuge with her in-laws in the northeastern Prussian village of Gross-Partsch. One morning the young woman is taken to Wolf's Lair, the Nazi headquarters. There she joins a group of women who are forced to eat meals before they are served to the Führer to make sure that the food is not poisoned. In this atmosphere of coercion, and torn between the fear of dying and the hunger that devours them, the tasters will form alliances, friendships and secret pacts among themselves, without ceasing to hope.

== Cast ==
- Elisa Schlott as Rosa Sauer
- Max Riemelt as Albert Ziegler
- Alma Hasun as Elfriede
- Emma Falck as Leni
- Olga von Luckwald as Heike
- Thea Rasche as Augustine
- Berit Vander as Ulla
- Kriemhild Hamann as Sabine
- Nicolò Pasetti as Gunther

== Production ==
The film is an adaptation of the 2018 award-winning novel At the Wolf's Table by Rosella Postorino. Principal photography started in May 2024, in the Alto Adige region, with minor footage in Switzerland and Belgium. The film was produced by Lumière & Co. in association with Anteo, with Tarantula and Tellfilm serving as co-producers.

== Release ==
The film had its premiere at the 2025 Bari International Film Festival and was released on Italian cinemas by Vision Distribution on 27 March 2025. The film was also released in Switzerland on 12 June by Morandini Film Distribution, and in Belgium on 27 August by Paradiso Films.

== Reception ==
The film received favorable reviews generally from Italian film critics.

La Repubblica's film critic Alberto Crespi described the film as "different from anything Soldini has shot so far", "well shot and beautifully acted", "an outstanding film that is worth watching". Manuela Santacatterina of Movieplayer.it described Le assaggiatrici “a film with an international scope” in which “the careful reconstruction of sets, makeup, and costumes is echoed in the excellent casting,” appreciating the director's decisions to move the filming into “circumscribed spaces” and “on the details, the small personal stories, the details on the sidelines of the conflict. It reconstructs a women's world victimized by the conflict where solidarity and betrayal coexist." Carola Proto of Comingsoon.it also noted how "the organization of the filmic space is perfect", dwelling on the female characters "filmed in groups, they seem to press on the edges of the frame", but that in the course of the film "each one acquires distinct traits, calling for identification and leading us to reflect on past and current oppressive dynamics, on painful historical ebbs and flows".

== Accolades ==
Year	Award	Category	Nominee(s)	Result	Ref.
2025	Nastri d'Argento	Best Film		Nominated	
2025	Nastri d'Argento	Best Editing	Carlotta Cristiani, Giorgio Garini	Nominated	
2025	Nastri d'Argento	Best Casting	Laura Muccino, Liza Stutzky	Won	
2025	Globi d'Oro	Best Film		Nominated	
2025	Globi d'Oro	Best Director	Silvio Soldinii	Nominated	
2025	Globi d'Oro	Best Screenplay	Doriana Leondeff, Silvio Soldini, Cristina Comencini, Giulia Calenda, Ilaria Macchia, Lucio Ricca	Won	
2025	Premio Flaiano	Outstanding Film		Won	
2026	David di Donatello	Best Film		Nominated	
2026	David di Donatello	Best Director	Silvio Soldini	Nominated	
2026	David di Donatello	Best Adapted Screenplay	Doriana Leondeff, Silvio Soldini, Lucio Ricca, Cristina Comencini, Giulia Calenda, Ilaria Macchia	Won	
2026	David di Donatello	Best Producer	Lionello Cerri, Cristiana Mainardi, Joseph Rouschop, Katrin Renz, Stefan Jäger	Nominated	
2026	David di Donatello	Best Casting	Laura Muccino, Liza Stutzky	Nominated	
2026	David di Donatello	Best Cinematography	Renato Berta	Nominated	
2026	David di Donatello	Best Score	Mauro Pagani	Nominated	
2026	David di Donatello	Best Production Design	Paola Bizzarri, Igor Gabriel	Nominated	
2026	David di Donatello	Best Costumes	Marina Roberti	Nominated	
2026	David di Donatello	Best Make-Up	Esmé Sciaroni	Won	
2026	David di Donatello	Best Hairstyling	Samankta Mura	Nominated	
2026	David di Donatello	Best Sound	Antoine Vandendriessche, Daniela Bassan, Stefano Grosso, Giancarlo Rutigliano	Nominated	
2026	David di Donatello	Young David		Won	
