= Sweetheart (2025 film) =

2025 Italian family drama film

- Promotional poster
- Italian: Gioia mia
- Literally: My Joy
- Directed by: Margherita Spampinato
- Screenplay by: Margherita Spampinato
- Produced by: Benedetta Scagnelli; Alessio Pasqua
- Starring: Marco Fiore; Aurora Quattrocchi; Martina Ziami; Camille Dugay
- Cinematography: Claudio Cofrancesco
- Edited by: Margherita Spampinato
- Production companies: Yagi Media; Gianluca Arcopinto
- Distributed by: Fandango Distribuzione
- Release date: 11 August 2025 (Locarno)
- Running time: 90 minutes
- Country: Italy
- Language: Italian

Sweetheart (Italian: Gioia mia) is a 2025 Italian family drama film written and directed by Margherita Spampinato in her feature debut. The film starring Aurora Quattrocchi, follows Nico, a spirited and surly child brought up in a secular, tech-driven household, is reluctantly sent to spend the summer in Sicily with his aunt Gela, an old-fashioned, devout woman.

The film had its world premiere at the 78th Locarno Film Festival on 11 August 2025, in the Filmmakers of the Present Competition section, where it competed for Golden Leopard – Filmmakers of the Present

== Cast ==
- Marco Fiore as Nico
- Aurora Quattrocchi as Gela
- Martina Ziami
- Camille Dugay

== Production ==
The film marks the feature-length directorial debut of Margherita Spampinato, who has also written the screenplay and edited the film. It is produced by Benedetta Scagnelli and Alessio Pasqua for Yagi Media. Cinematography is handled by Claudio Cofrancesco.

== Release ==
Sweetheart had its world premiere in the 'Filmmakers of the Present Competition' section of the 78th Locarno Film Festival on 11 August 2025, vying for the Golden Leopard – Filmmakers of the Present.

It was also presented in the World Cinema section at the 30th Busan International Film Festival on 18 September 2025.

It competed in 'Meet the Neighbors Competition' section at the Thessaloniki International Film Festival on 7 November 2025. It was presented in 'Rising Stars - 2025' section of the 56th International Film Festival of India in November 2025.

== Accolades ==
Award	Date of ceremony	Category	Recipient	Result	Ref.
David di Donatello	6 May 2026	Best Directorial Debut	Margherita Spampinato	Won	
David di Donatello	6 May 2026	Best Original Screenplay	Margherita Spampinato	Nominated	
David di Donatello	6 May 2026	Best Actress	Aurora Quattrocchi	Won	
Locarno Film Festival	16 August 2025	Golden Leopard – Filmmakers of the Present	Sweetheart	Nominated	
Locarno Film Festival	16 August 2025	Special Jury Prize CINÉ+	Sweetheart	Won	
Locarno Film Festival	16 August 2025	Pardo for Best Performance	Aurora Quattrocchi	Won	
Sindacato Nazionale Critici Cinematografici Italiani	2025	Film of the Year	Sweetheart	Won	
