= Brion tomb =

Sanctuary in Italy designed by Carlo Scarpa

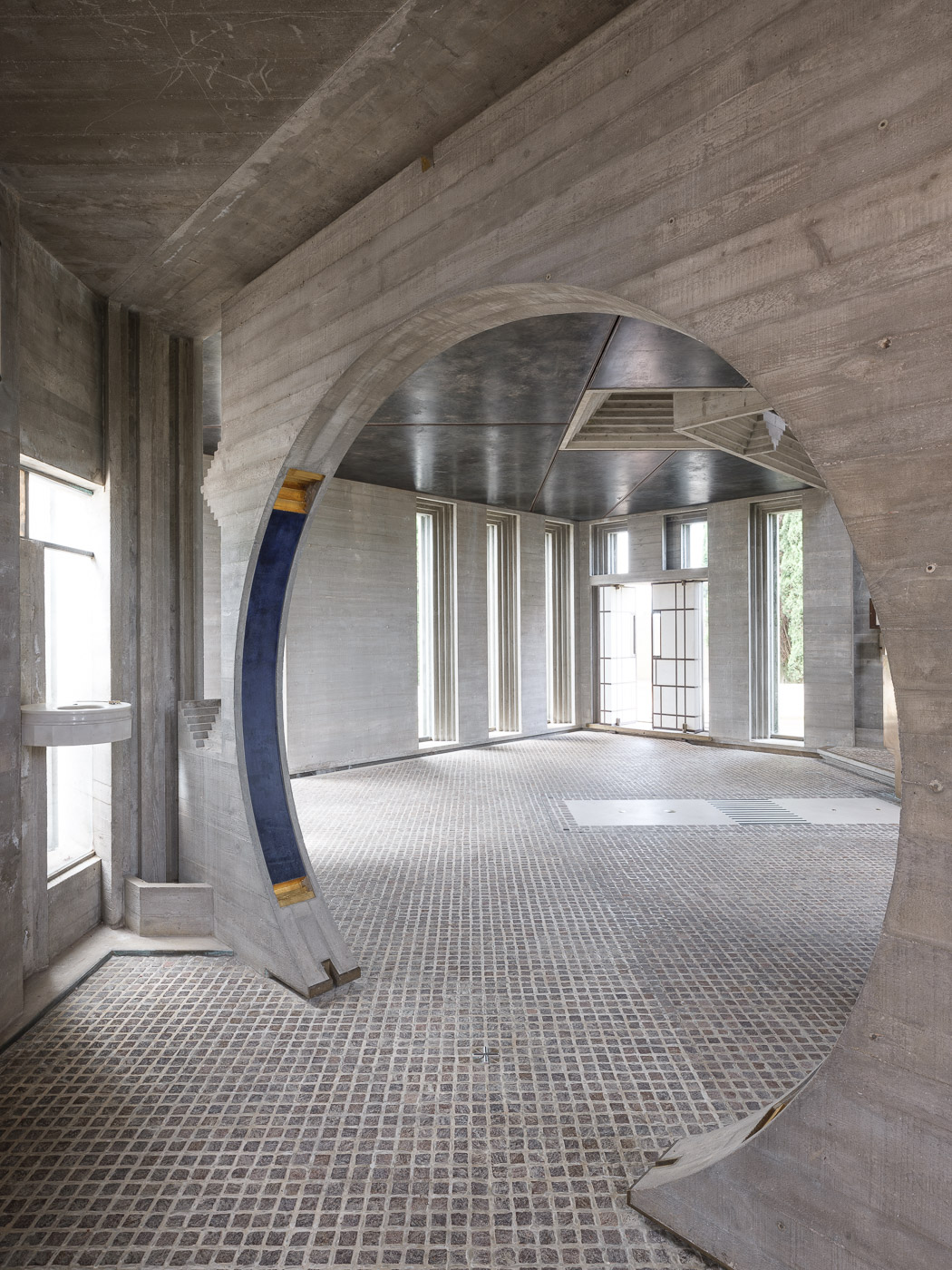
- Interactive map of Brion tomb
- Location: Altivole, Italy
- Coordinates: 45.751323°N 11.913341°E
- Designer: Carlo Scarpa
- Type: Funerary art

The Brion tomb, also known as the Brion sanctuary and Brion-Vega tomb, in San Vito d'Altivole near Treviso, Italy, is the burial ground of the Brion family. It was designed by Venetian architect Carlo Scarpa between 1968–1978 as an L-shaped 2,000 m^{2} (22,000 sq ft) extension to the adjacent municipal cemetery. It is regarded as a masterpiece of post-modernist architecture and a powerful commemorative monument.

Scarpa felt that "the place for the dead is a garden" and is himself buried adjacent to the Brion sanctuary.

== Commission ==
The monumental project was commissioned in 1969 by Onorina Tomasin-Brion, widow of Giuseppe Brion, the founder of the Brionvega company. The enclosure is a private burial ground for the Brion family. Their twinned sarcophagi are central to the composition.

Sarcophagus of Onorina Brion

Sarcophagus of Giuseppe Brion

== Composition and design ==
The sanctuary is designed as a composition of concrete buildings with distinctive detailing set in gardens with water features. It has been described as "both a meditation on death and an evocation of a particular magical city, Venice". Scarpa has been quoted as saying "I like water very much, perhaps because I am Venetian ..."

Scarpa began designing this addition to the existing municipal cemetery of San Vito d'Altivole in 1968. Although he continued to consider changes to the project, it was completed before his accidental death in Japan in 1978. Several discrete elements comprise the family burial site: a sloped concrete enclosing wall, two distinct entrances, a small chapel, two covered burial areas (the arcosolium for Giuseppe and Onorina Brion, and one for other family members). The "viewing device" of the pavilion of meditation suggests a vesica piscis, a recurring motif in Scarpa's architecture. Venetian influences such as the gold tiles familiar from Byzantine mosaics and Japanese influences such as the tea-room inspiration of the chapel are evident in the design. In the garden are a dense grove of cypresses, a prato (lawn), and a private meditation/viewing pavilion, separated from the main prato by a separate and locked entrance, and a heavily vegetated reflecting pool.

== Restoration and oversight ==
A conservation restoration of the Brion tomb was completed in September 2021. The Brion heirs, Ennio and Donatella, donated the site to Italian Environmental Fund (FAI) in 2022.

== In popular culture ==
The Brion tomb was used as the imperial court of House Corrino on Kaitain for the filming of Dune: Part Two in July 2022 and appears in the film The Last One for the Road.
