= Brionvega =

Italian electronics company

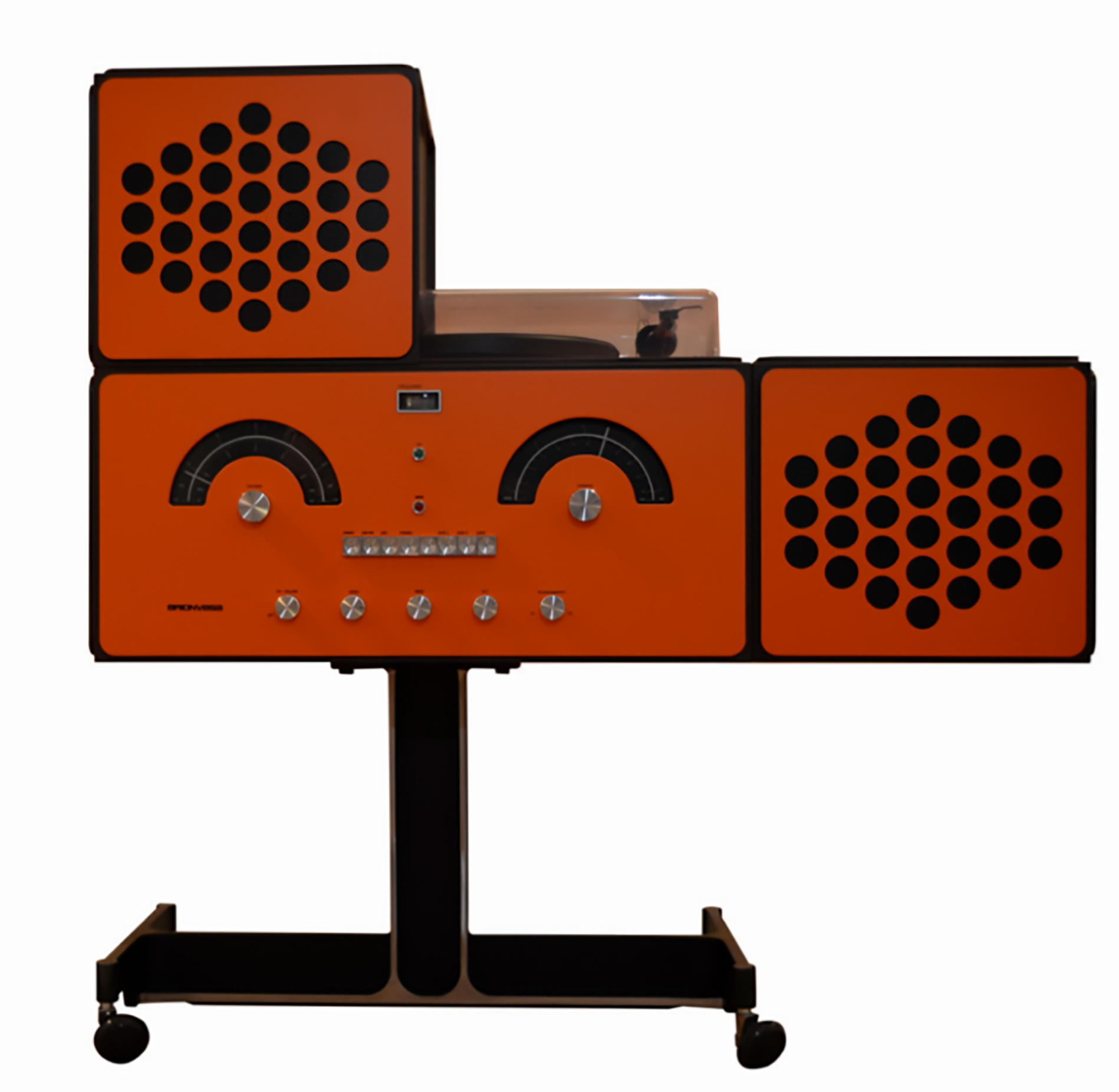
- RR 126 radiogram designed by Achille and Pier Giacomo Castiglioni
- Type: Private
- Industry: Consumer electronics
- Predecessor: B.P.M. Radio; Vega BP Radio
- Founded: 1945
- Founder: Giuseppe Brion; Onorina Tomasin-Brion; Leone Pajetta
- Headquarters: Pordenone, Italy
- Area served: Worldwide
- Products: Television sets, Radiograms, Phonographs, Radios
- Parent: Sèleco
- Website: brionvega.it brionvega.tv

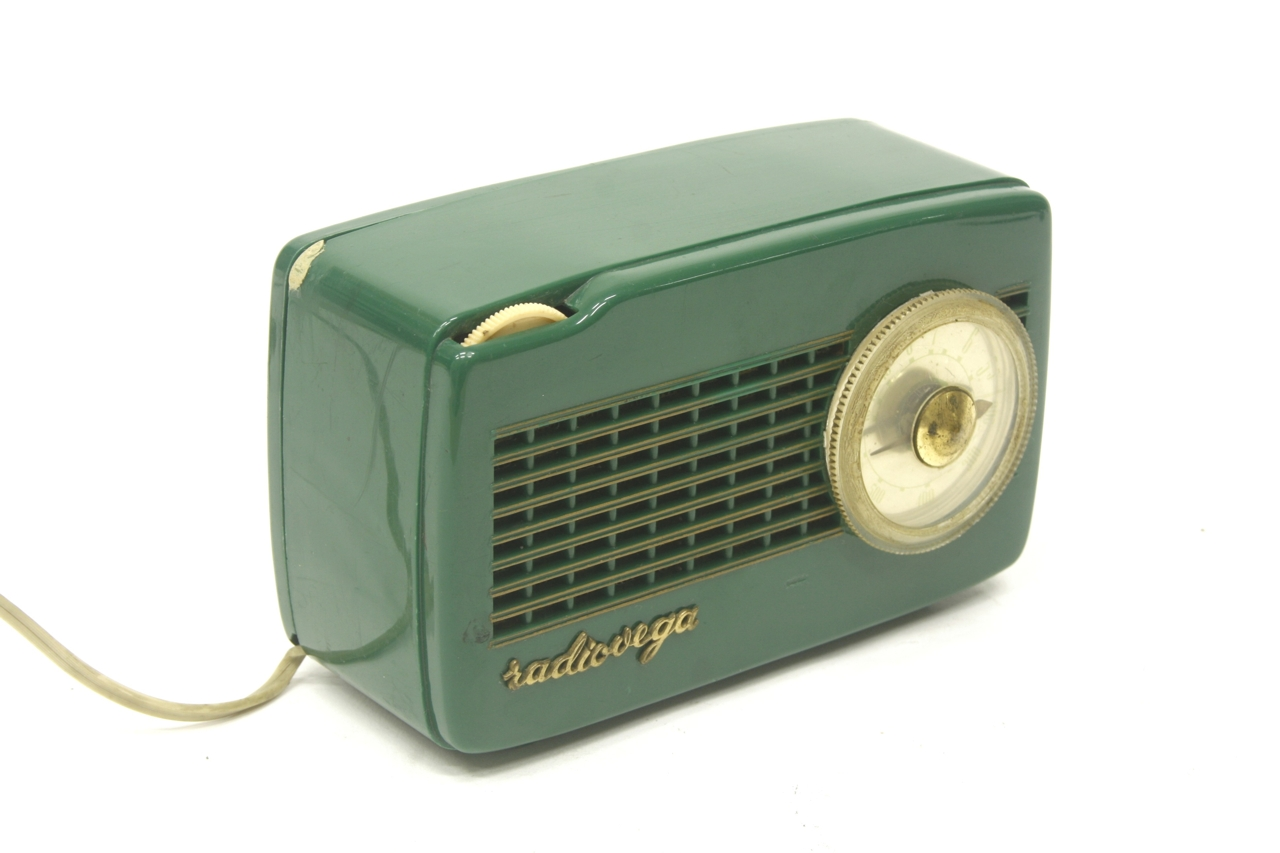
Model 514 "radiovega" table radio (1950s)

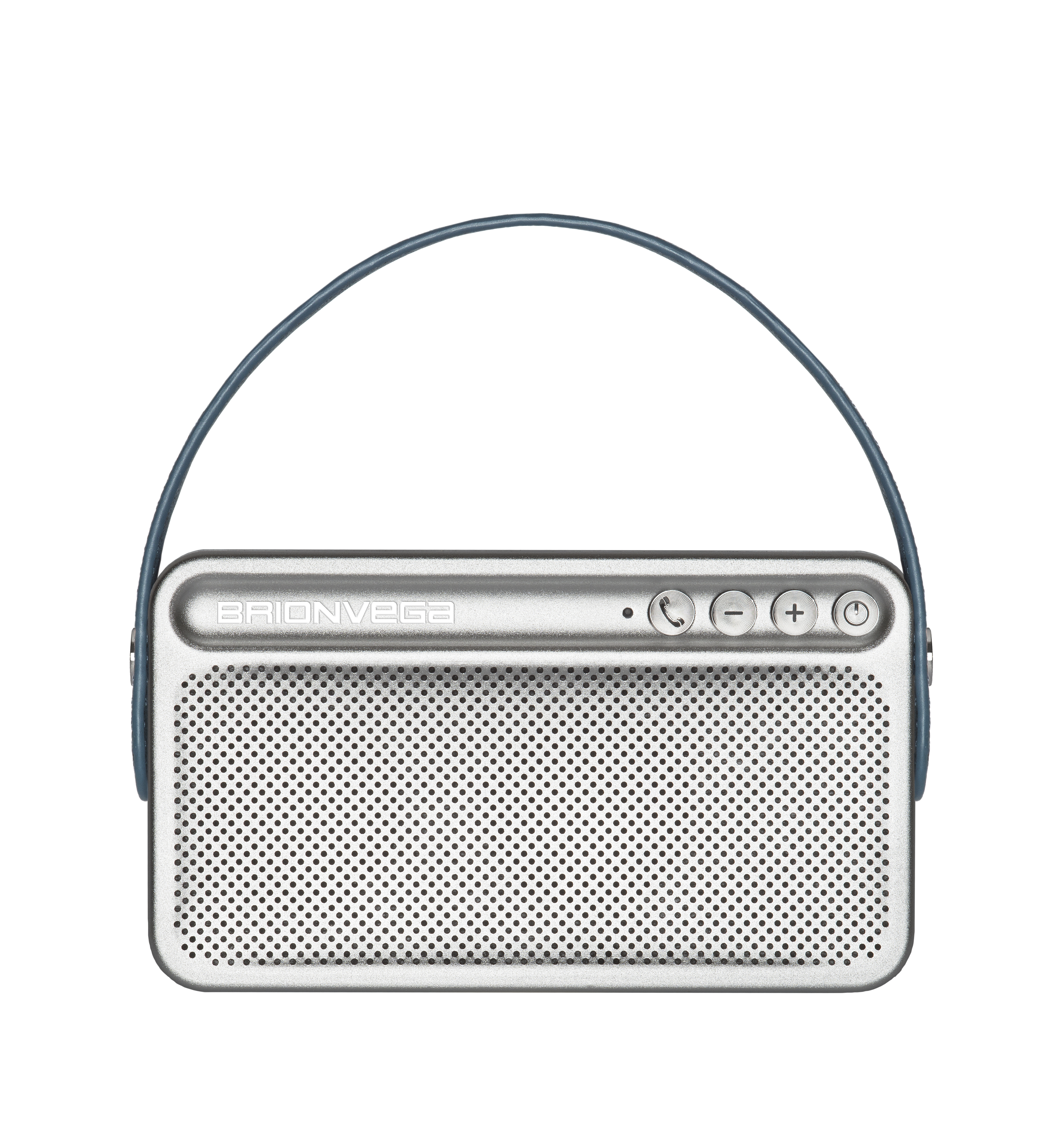
WearIT TS 217 bluetooth speaker designed by Michael Young (2015) (Note: No longer in production (June 2026))

Brionvega is an Italian electronics company that is known for manufacturing futuristic television sets and audio equipment, its contributions to post-second world war technological and social advancement in Italian industry, collaborations with well known industrial designers and architects, and its impact on the aesthetics of the 1960s Italian design.

== History ==
The company was founded in 1945 in Milan by Giuseppe Brion (who had previously worked at Phonola and Radiomarelli), Onorina Tomasin-Brion, and Leone Pajetta. Initially named B.P.M. Radio, then changed to Vega BP Radio, and finally "BRIONVEGA", when the company was rebranded in 1963.

In 1954 Brionvega introduced the first Italian made television sets after entering into a contract with the country's national broadcaster RAI.

In the early 1960s Brionvega began working with notable architects and industrial designers including Franco Albini, Sergio Asti, Rodolfo Bonetto, brothers Achille, Livio, and Pier Giacomo Castiglioni, Mario Bellini, Richard Sapper, and Marco Zanuso. These collaborations resulted in a decade of design innovation and the introduction of products such as the Algol 11 and Doney 14 (Note: The metadata embedded in the photograph of the Brionvega Algol 11 in this article's "Gallery" section makes the claim that: "The first transistor television in Europe was the Doney 14 designed by Marco Zanuso and Richard Sapper for Brionvega in 1962..." Italian: Il primo televisore a transitor in Europa si ebbe nel 1962 su progetto di Marco Zanuso e Richard Sapper per la Brionvega, era il Doney 14... (See "Notizie storico-critiche" from the Museo Nazionale Scienza e Tecnologia Leonardo da Vinci included in the metadata of object photograph.)) television sets, TS 502 "Cubo" radio, the RR 126 radiogram, which was introduced in 1966, followed by the "Cubo" television in 1969.

The designs that the company manufactured during this period were recognised in their time with awards such as the Compasso d'Oro and Biennale of Design (BIO), and have since become regarded as icons of 1960s Italian design. Alba Cappellieri writing for Domus magazine stated that, "You could write a telling history of Italian post-war industrial design almost entirely through the products of Brionvega".

In more recent decades, the company continued its practice of collaboration with acclaimed designers including Ettore Sottsass, Michael Young, and Hannes Wettstein, periodically introducing new products such as the Alpha LCD television, presented at Salone del Mobile in 2007, and the WearIt portable speaker in 2016. An updated version of the original Cubo television was produced in 1992 with the same exterior casing and updated electronics. Two of the other 1960s products, the Doney and Algol television sets, were also re-issued in limited edition runs. The TS 502 portable radio and the RR 126 radiogram have both been re-issued and updated in several different versions.

In 1992, the Brion family sold the company to Italian electronics manufacturer Sèleco (which was subsequently acquired by Industrie Formenti in 1998, and eventually declared bankrupt in 2004). Brionvega has gone through several changes of ownership since, (Note: Companies mentioned in various sources as owners of the brand include: SIM 2 Multimedia, spa; Super//Fluo; and BV 2 srl, Milano. (Better sources needed.)) and as of 2022 was still actively marketing re-editions of the designs from its 1960s and 1970s heyday, as well as some more recent products.

== Legacy ==
Many of the company's products are held in museum collections including the ADI Design Museum in Milan, the Pompidou Centre in Paris, the Victoria and Albert in London, the Powerhouse Museum (Museum of Applied Arts and Sciences) in Sydney, and the Cooper Hewitt and Museum of Modern Art in New York.

The University of Parma holds a large collection of archival material relating to the company including sketches, drawings, prototypes, examples of Brionvega products, brochures and advertising materials. The National Museum of Science and Technology in Milan also holds a number of Brionvega products in its collection. (Note: Many of the photographs in the "Gallery" section of this article are from the museum's collection and include detailed information about the objects (in Italian).)

In 2016 a Brionvega RR 126 radiogram once owned by the singer David Bowie was sold by Sotheby's in London for £257,000.

Several examples of the company's products featured in the Art of Noise, a 2025 exhibition at the San Francisco Museum of Modern Art.

== Gallery ==
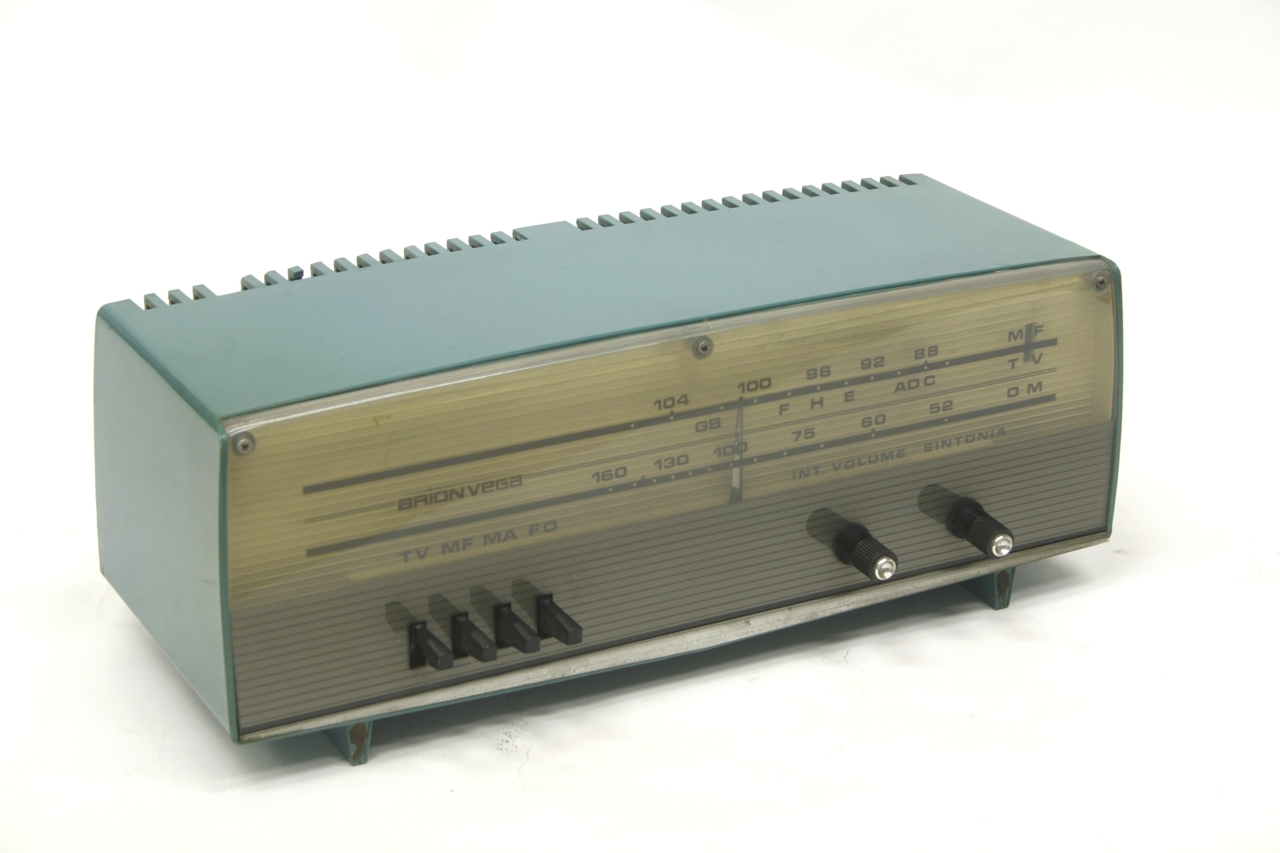
RR 121 vacuum tube table radio (1961)

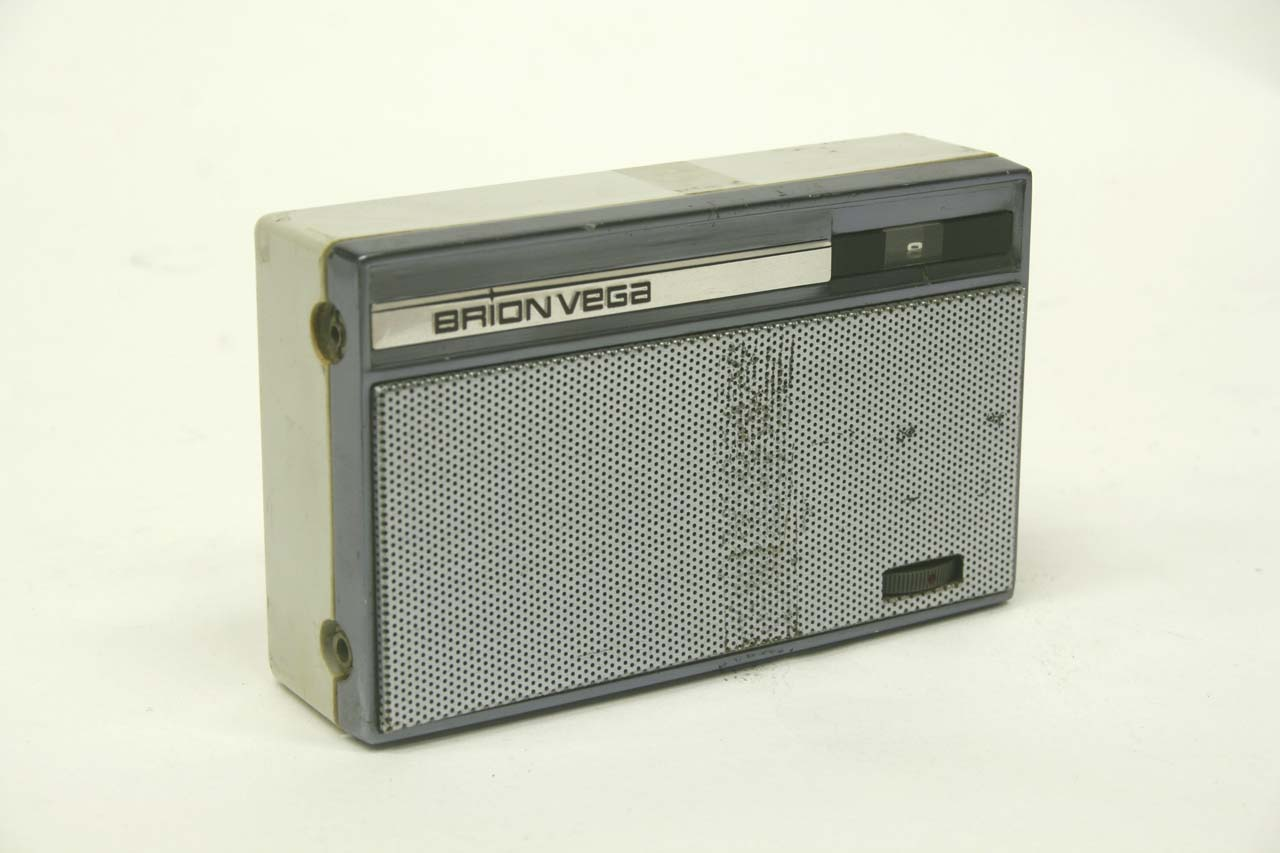
TS 207 portable transistor radio (1961)

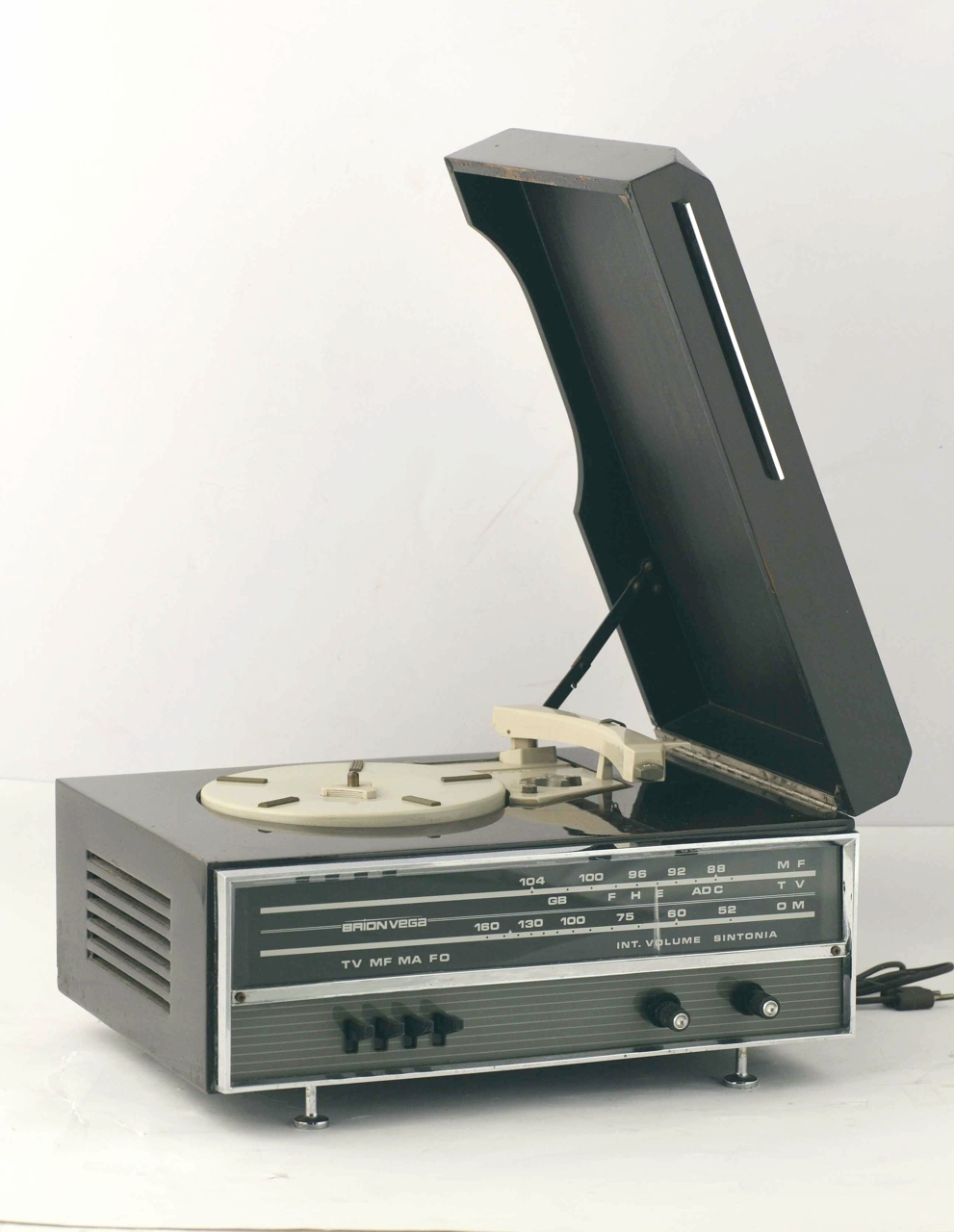
RR 122 tabletop radio phonograph (1961)

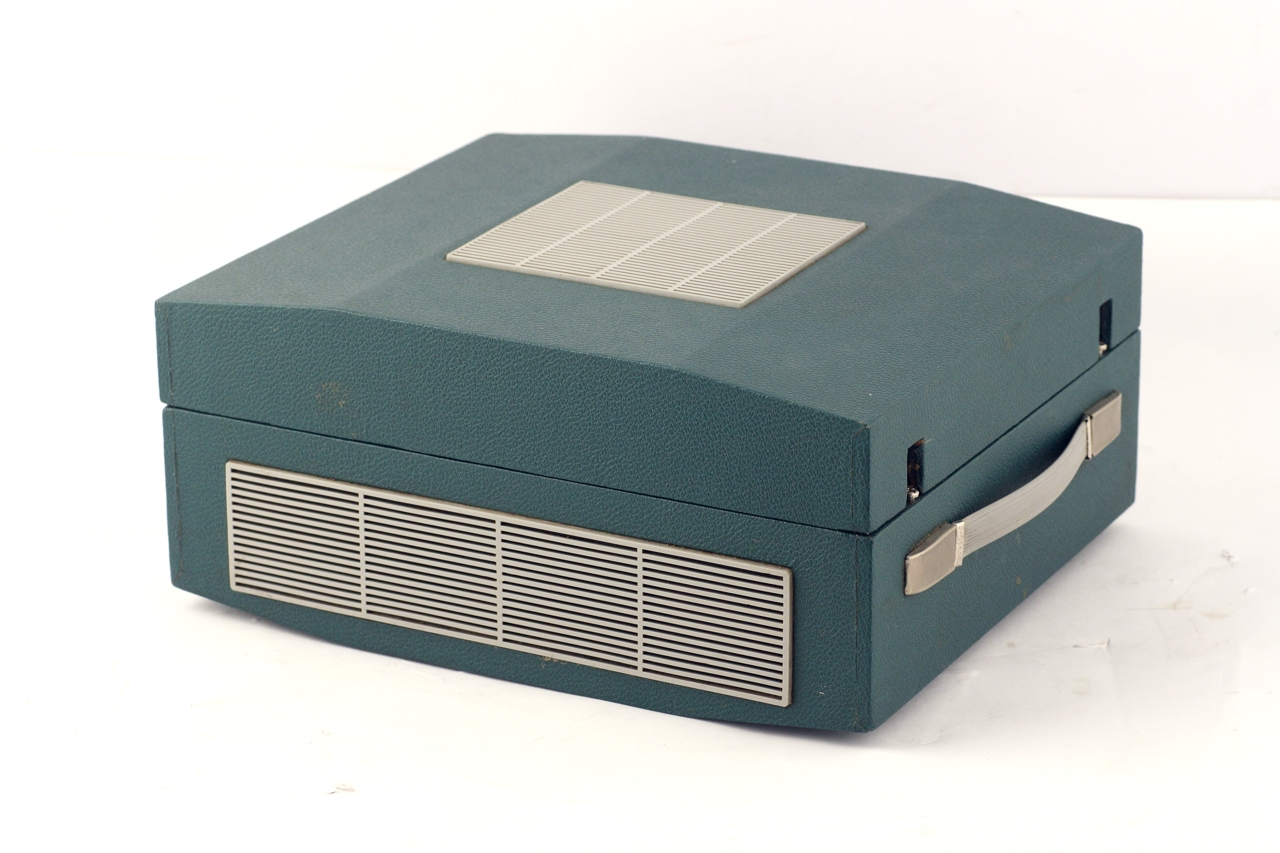
Portable phonograph with amplified speaker (1963)

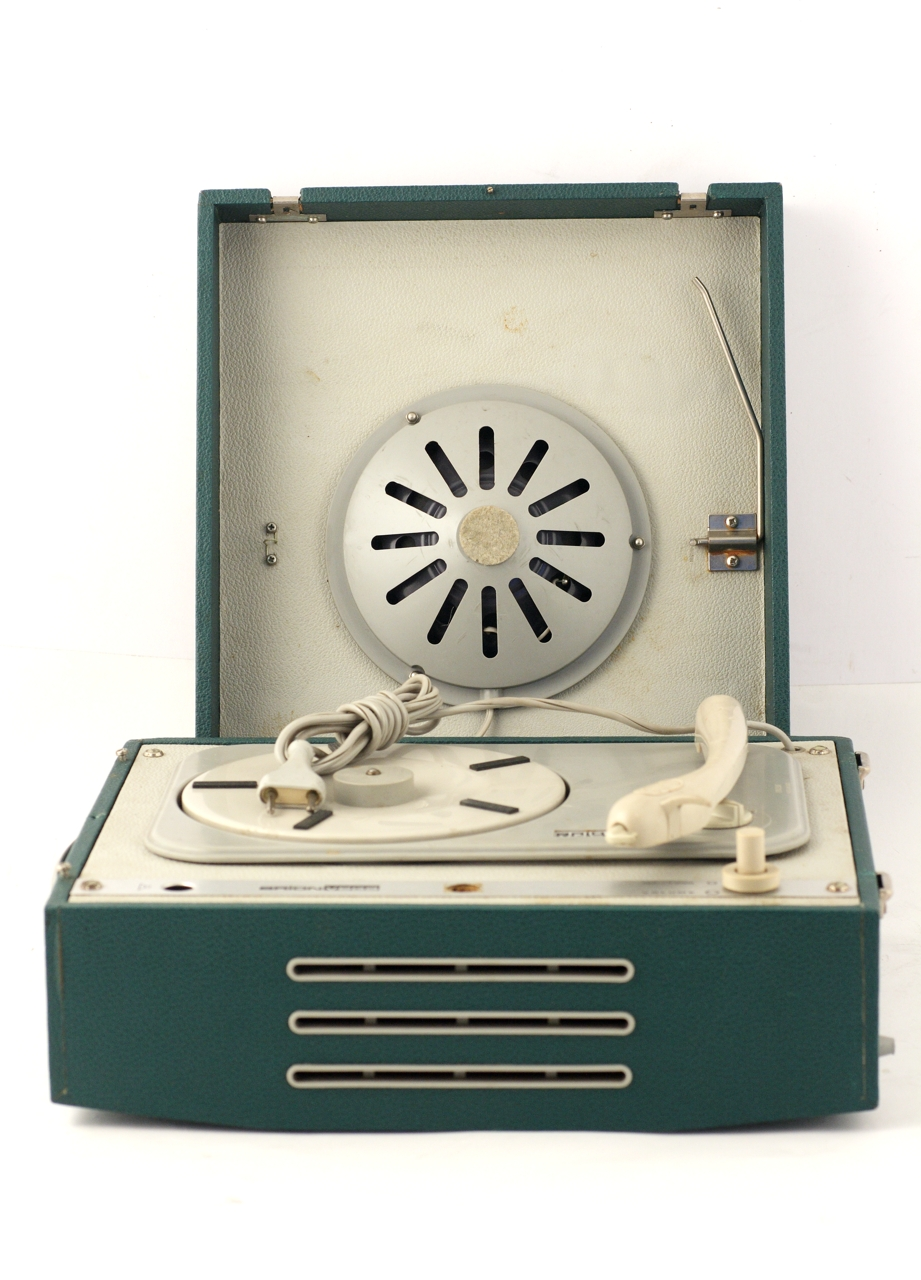
Portable phonograph (open)

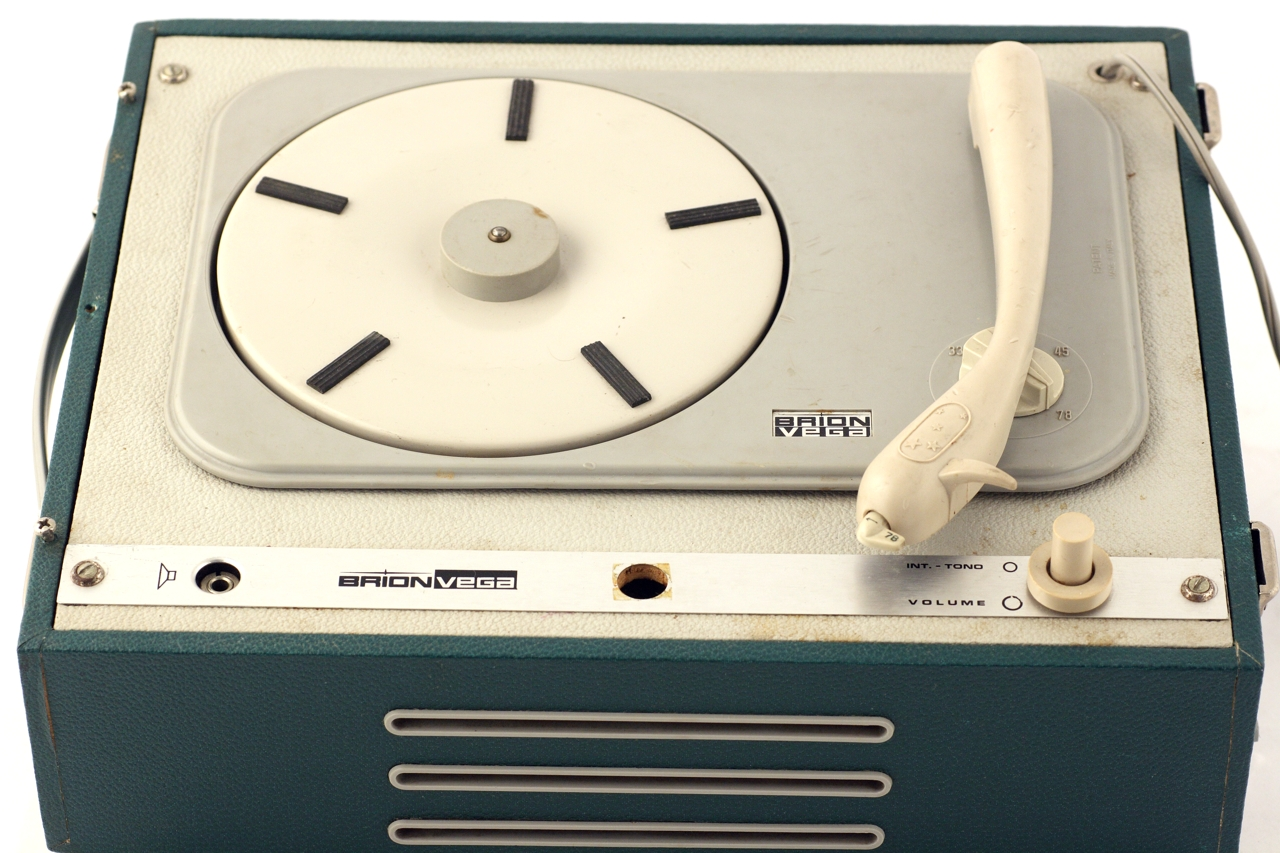
Portable phonograph (turntable detail)

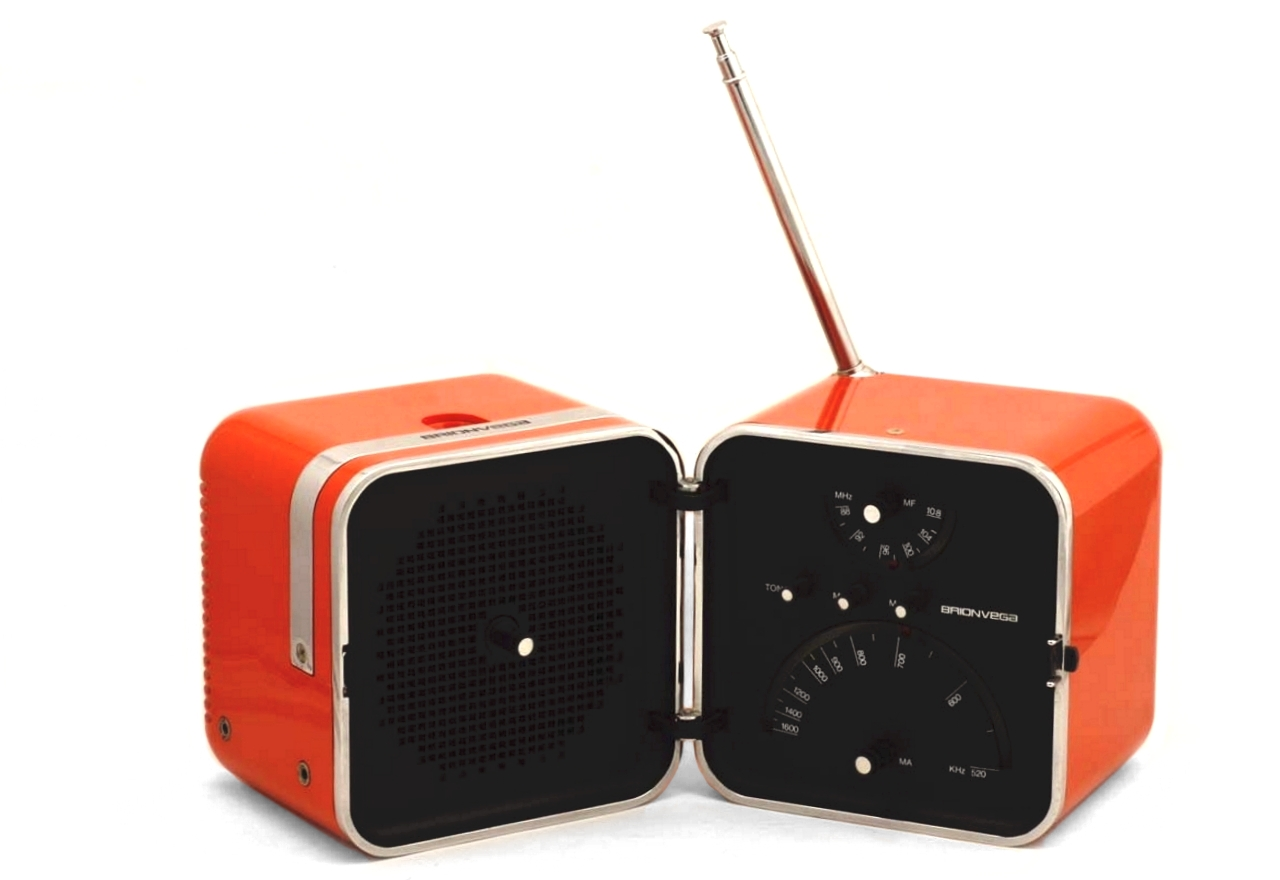
TS 502 "Cubo" Series II radio (1963) (Note: First released in 1963, while the second series (pictured) was designed in 1966 with FM tuning scale up to 108 MHz, and again updated in 1978. There was also an "export" version of the TS 502 which included long-wave reception. The 2007 re-issue was called the TS 522. (See "Notizie storico-critiche" from the Museo Nazionale Scienza e Tecnologia Leonardo da Vinci included in the metadata of object photographs.)) (Note: Designed by Richard Sapper and Marco Zanuso)

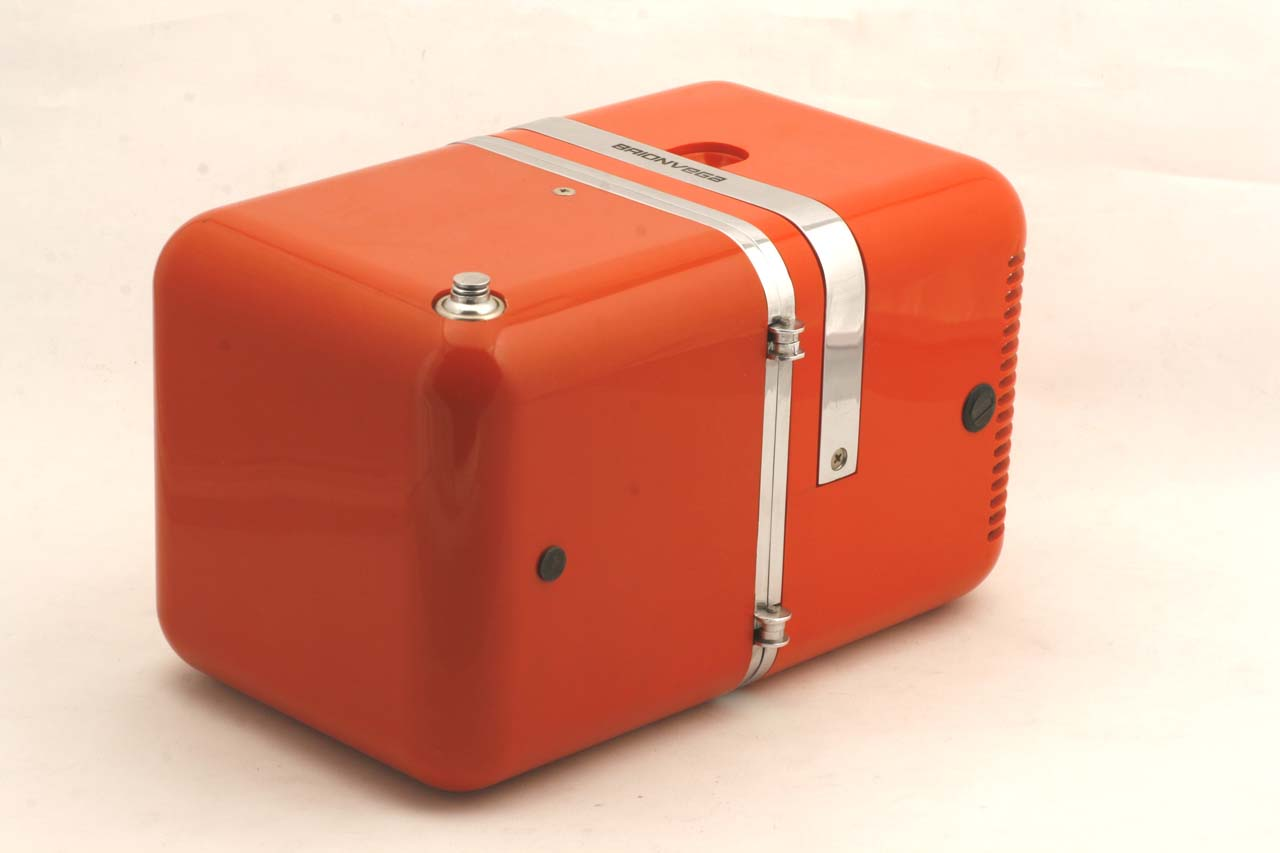
TS 502 (closed)

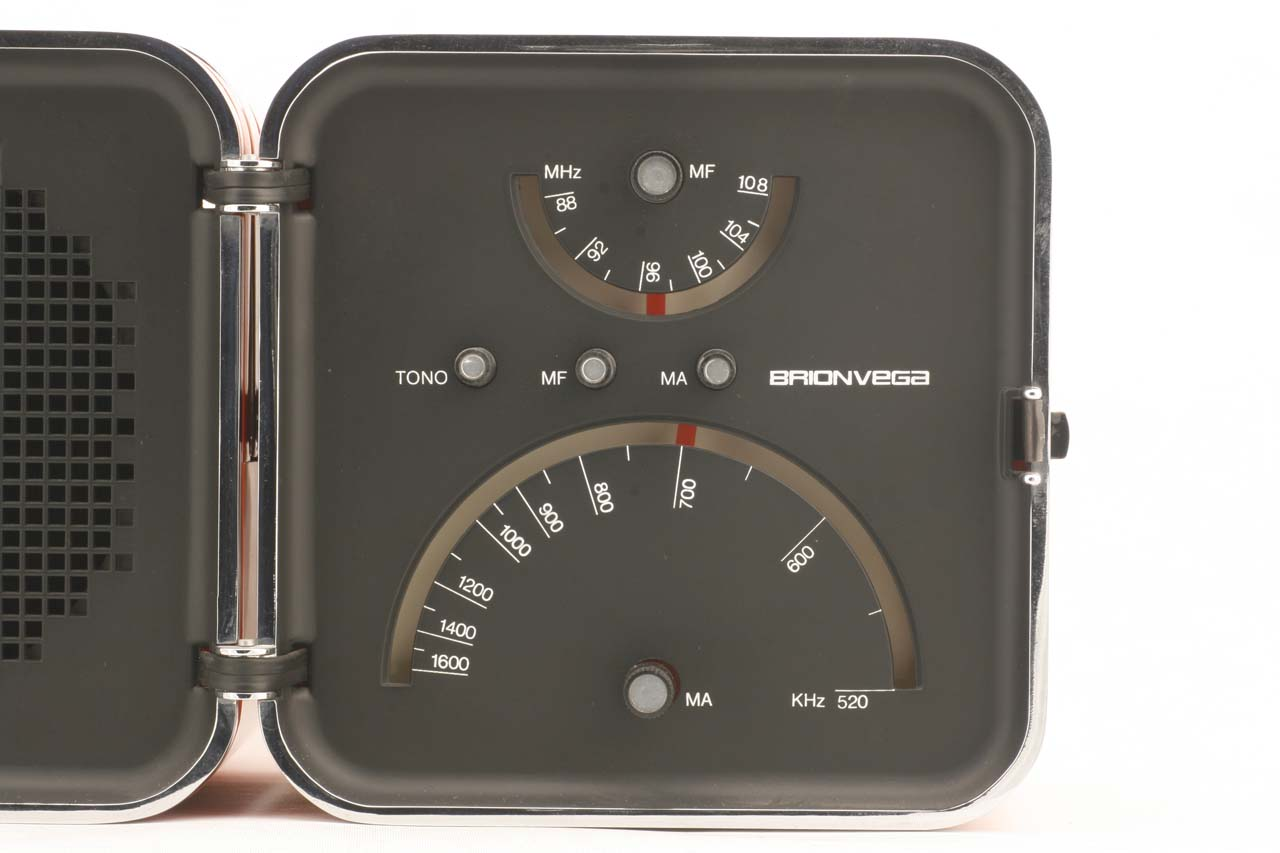
TS 502 (detail)

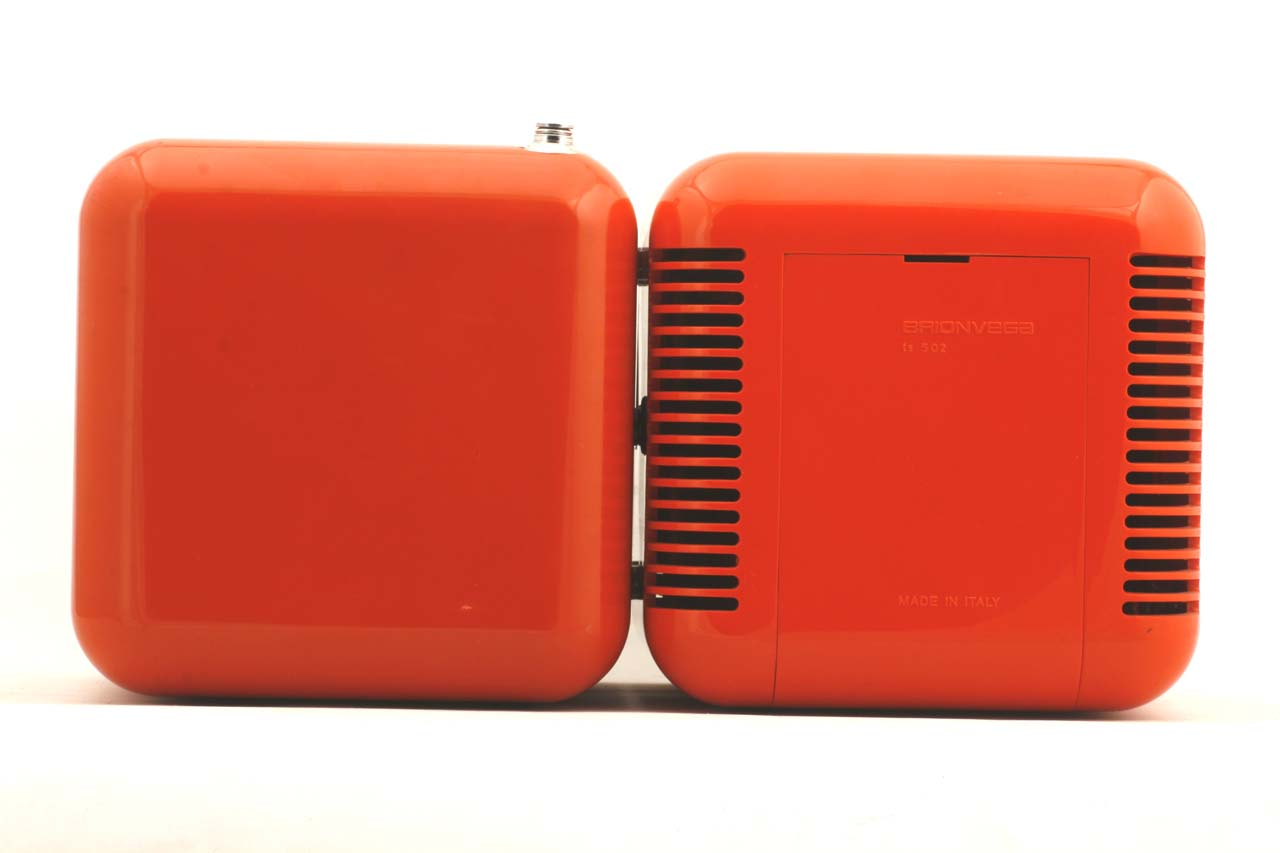
TS 502 (back view)

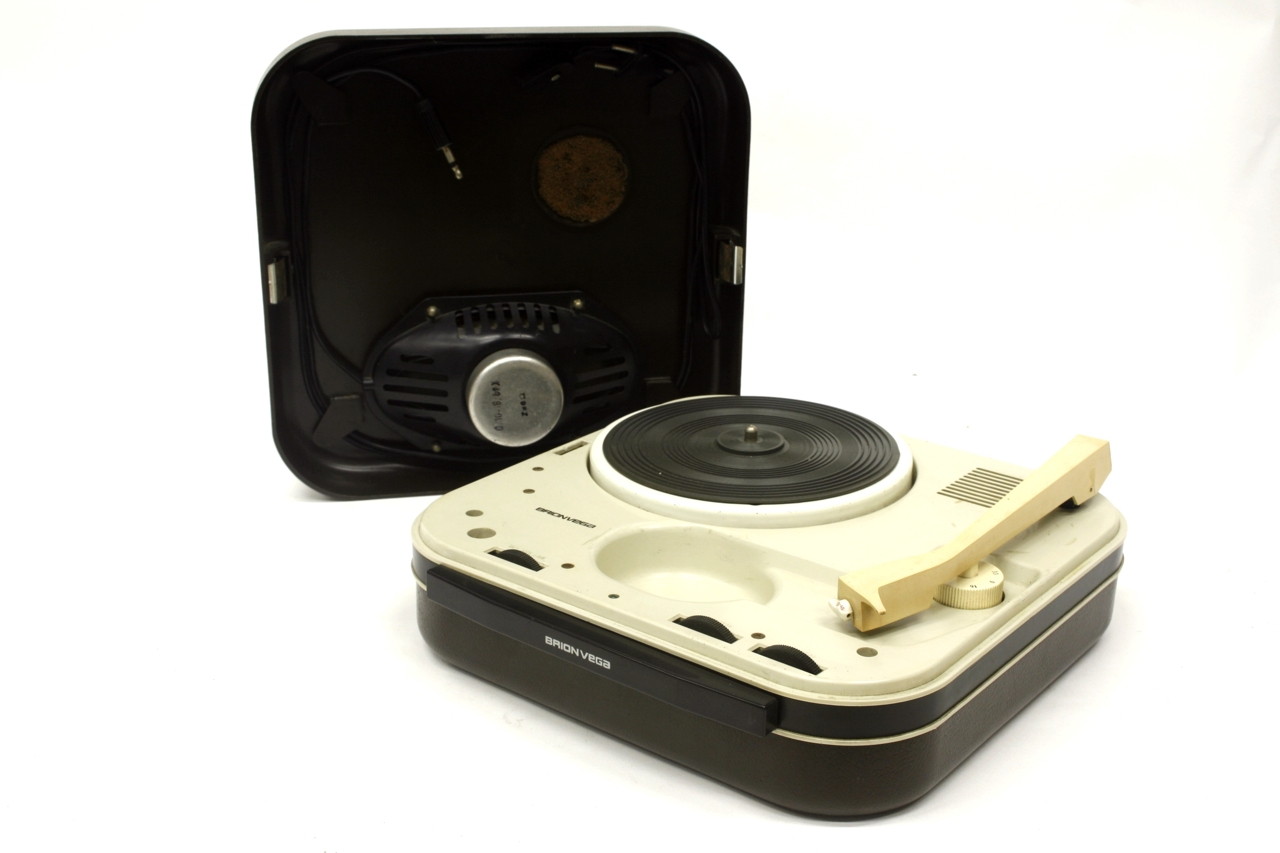
Portable phonograph (1963)

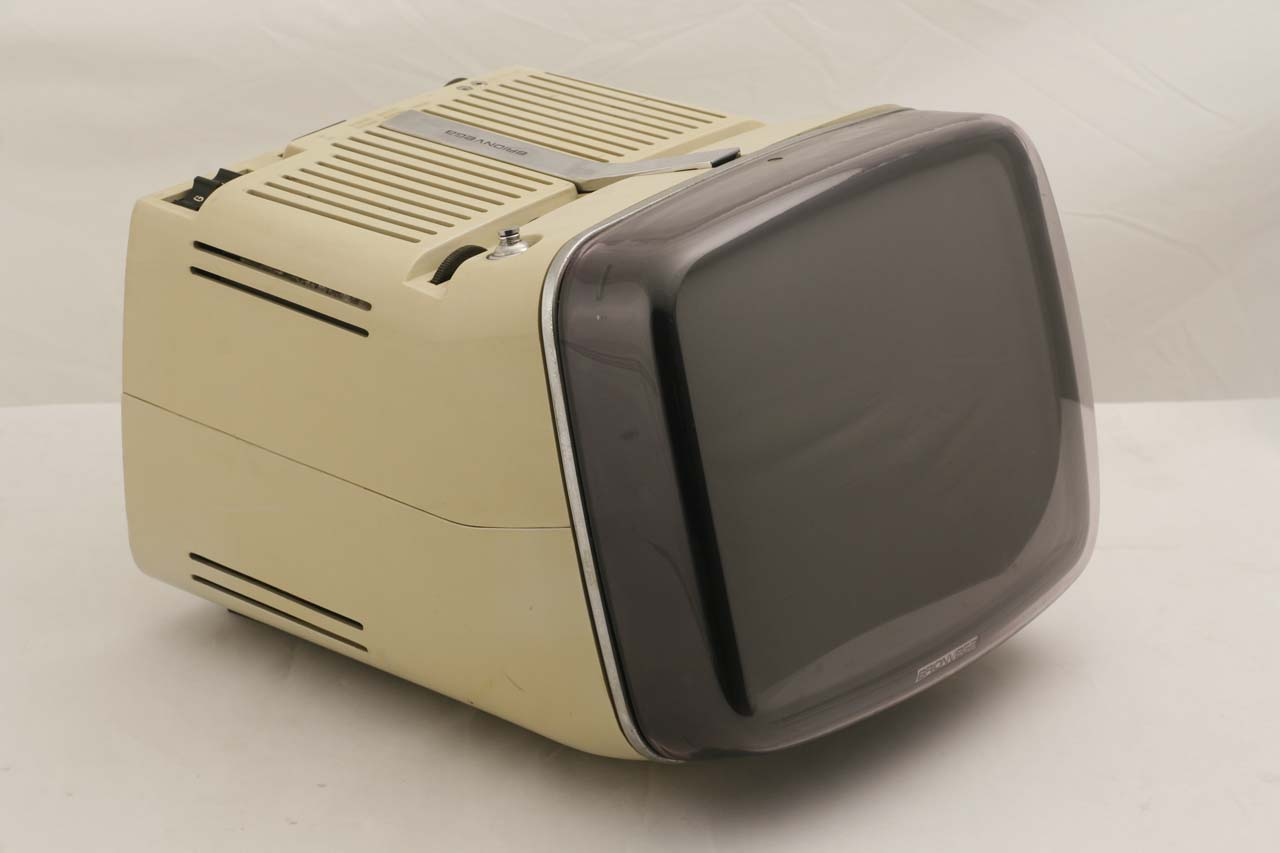
Algol 11 portable television (1964)

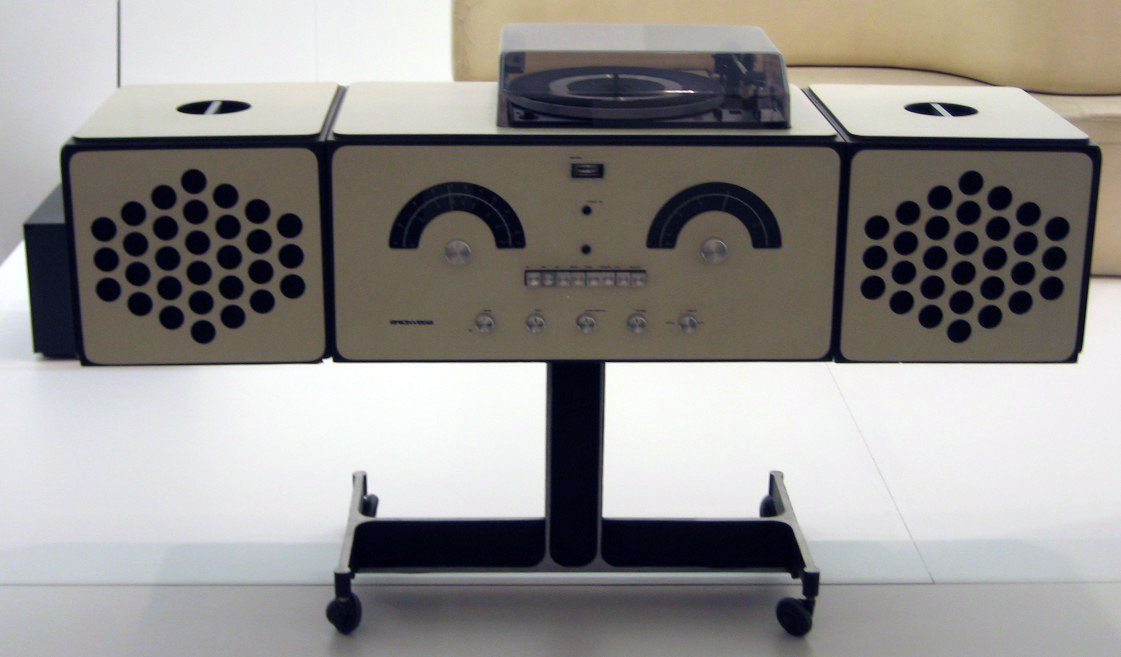
RR126 radiogram (1966) (Note: Designed by Achille and Pier Giacomo Castiglioni)

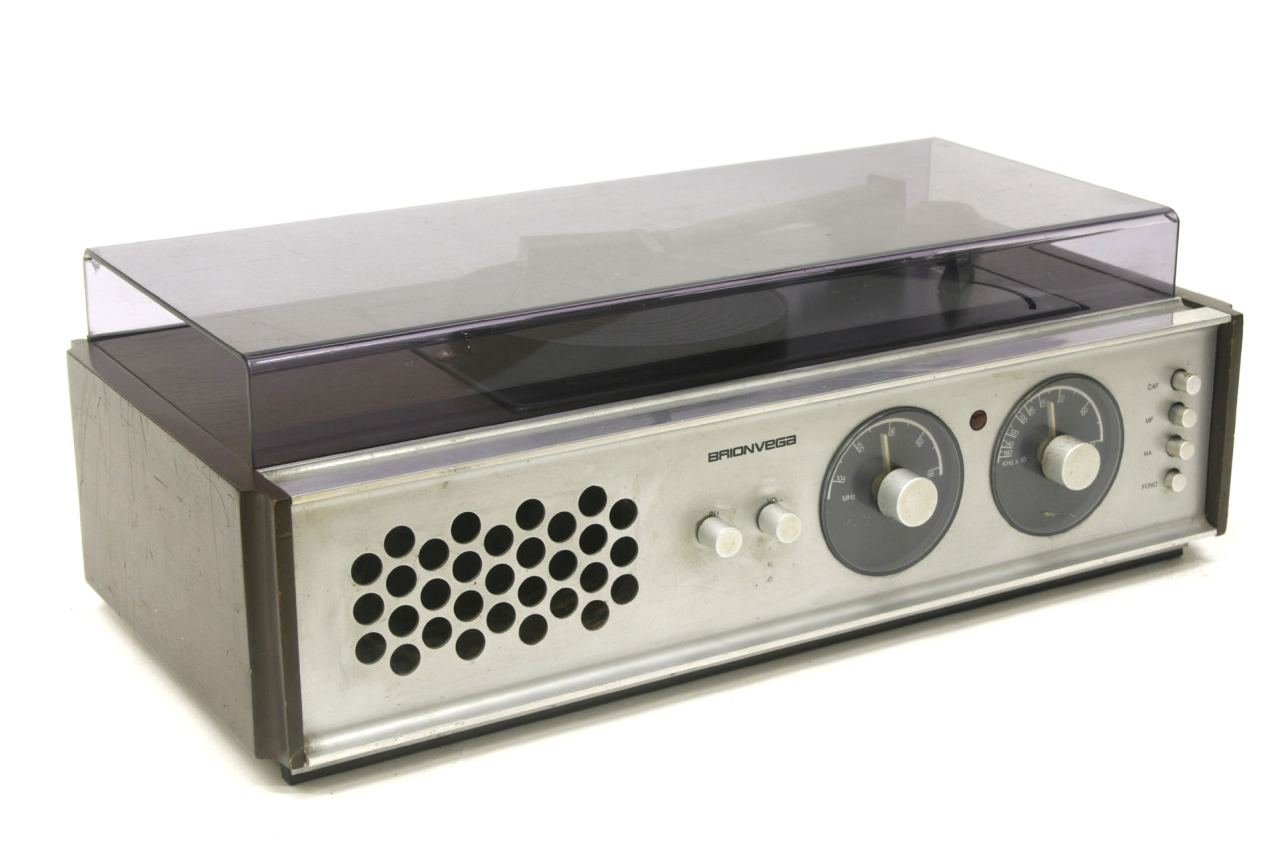
RR128 tabletop radio phonograph (1967)

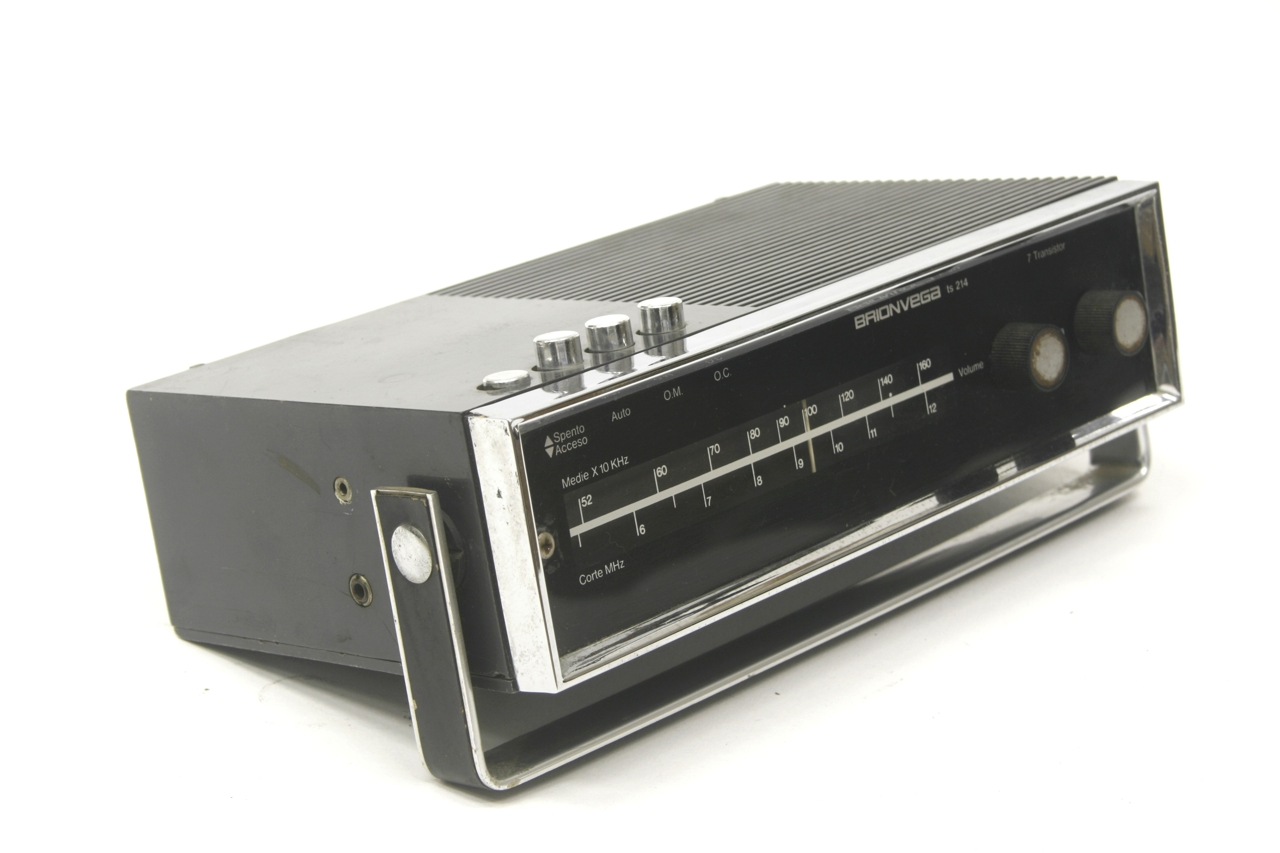
TS 214 Portable transistor radio (1967)

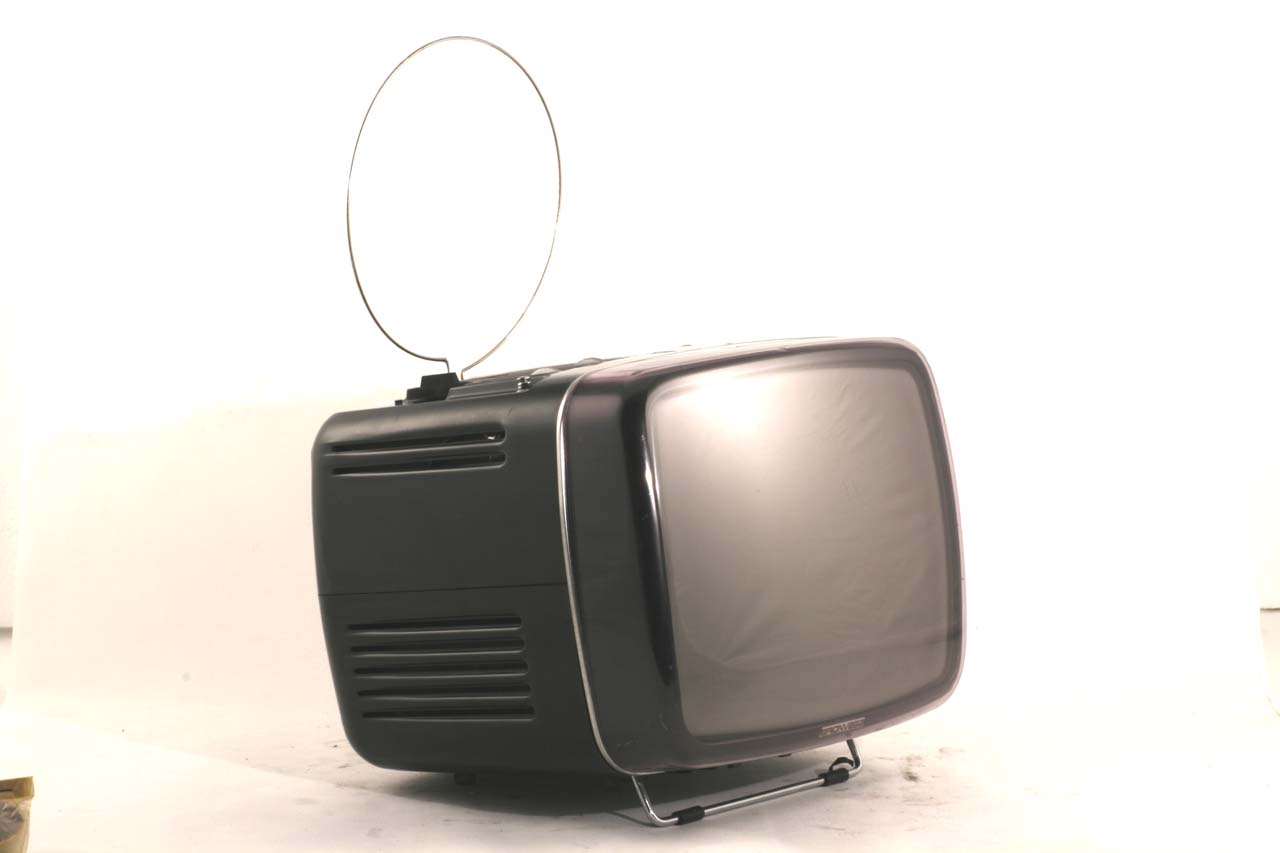
Doney 12 portable television (1967)

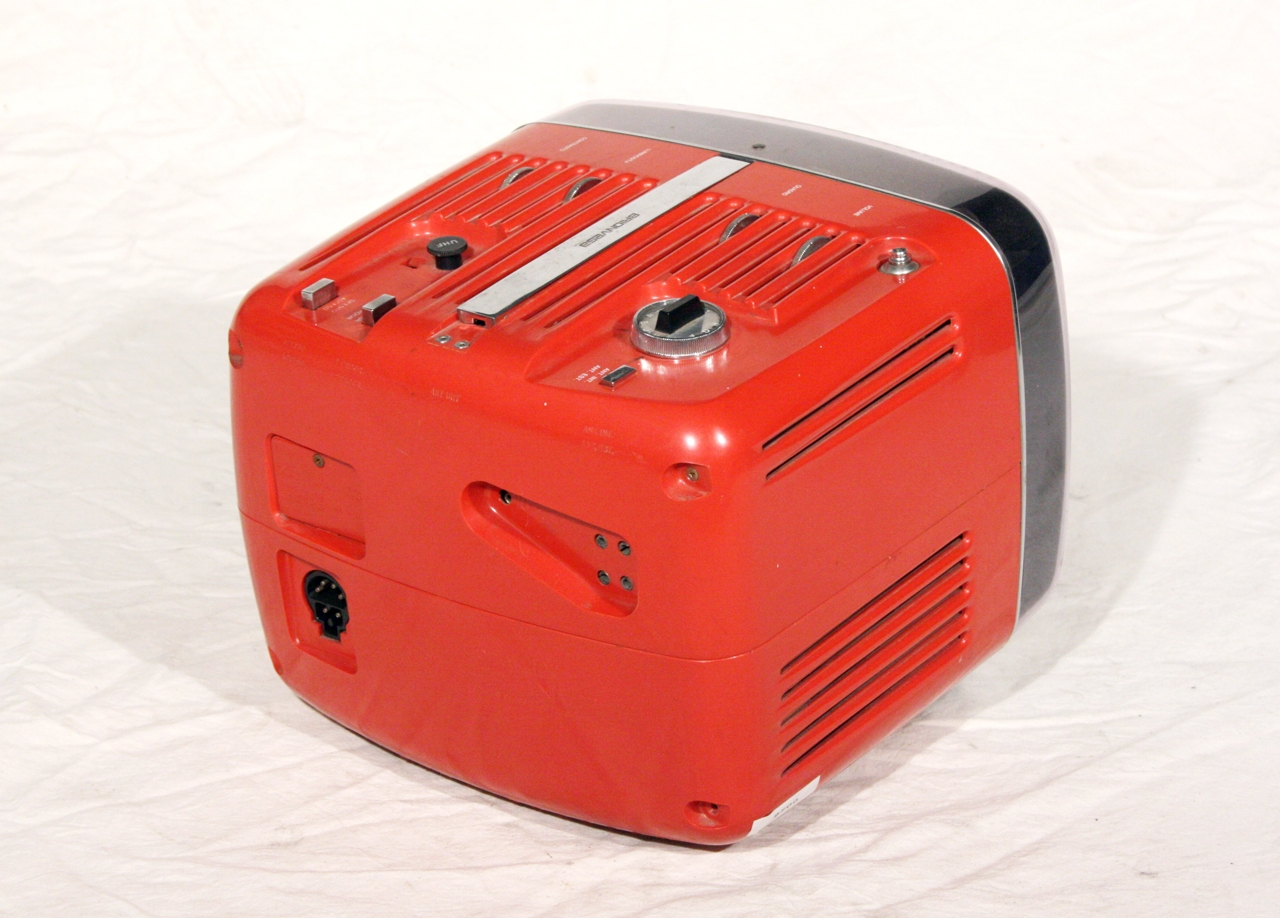
Doney television (rear view)

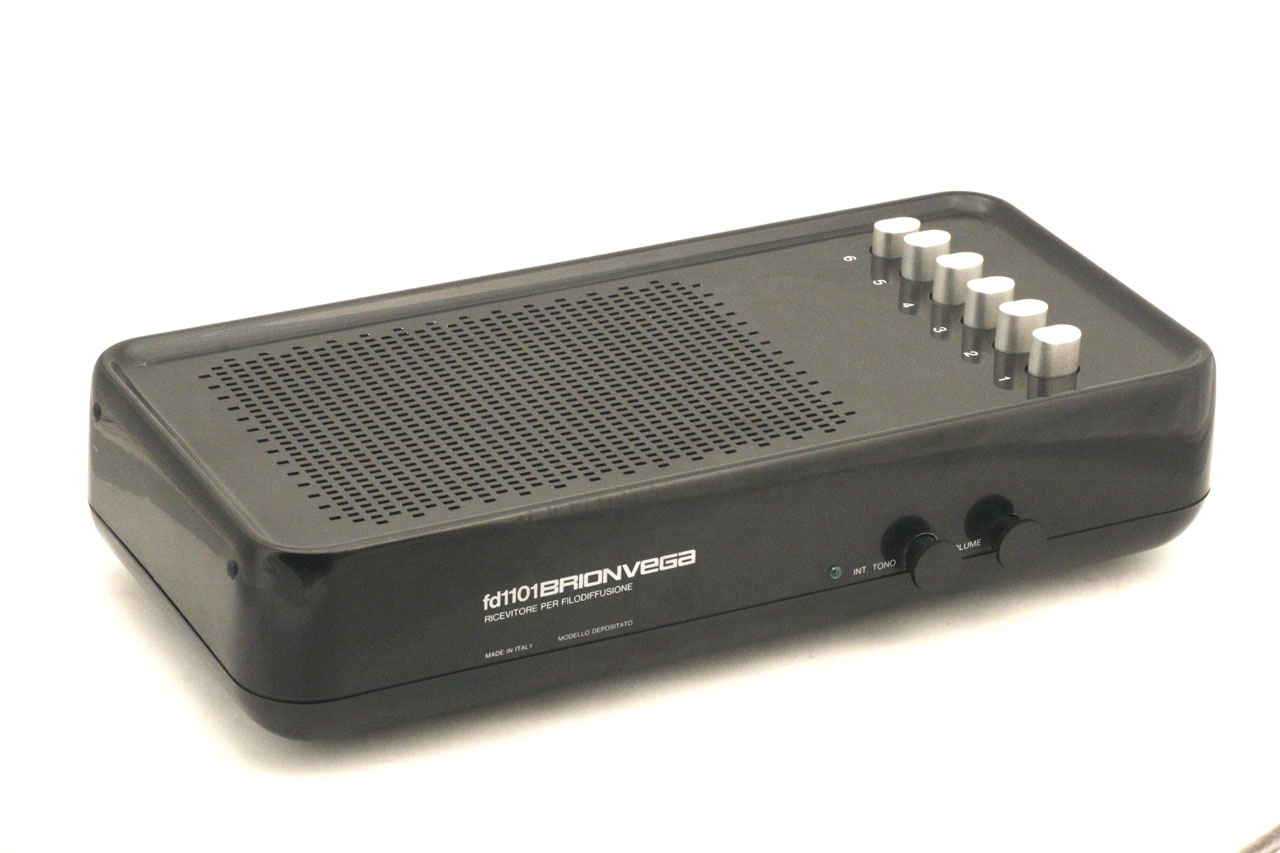
FD 1101 Analog Piped Radio receiver (1967)

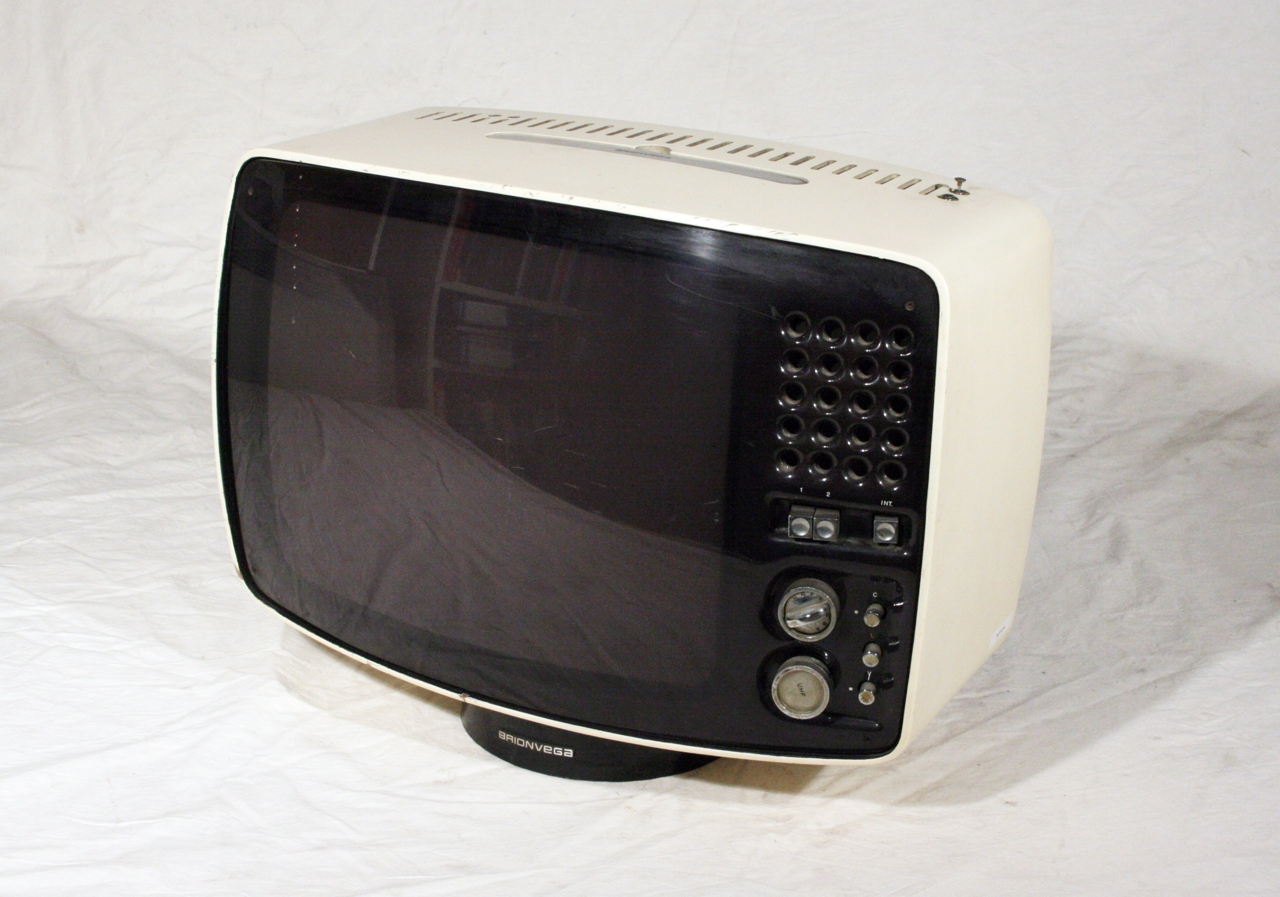
Volans 17 television (1968) (Note: Designed by Mario Bellini)

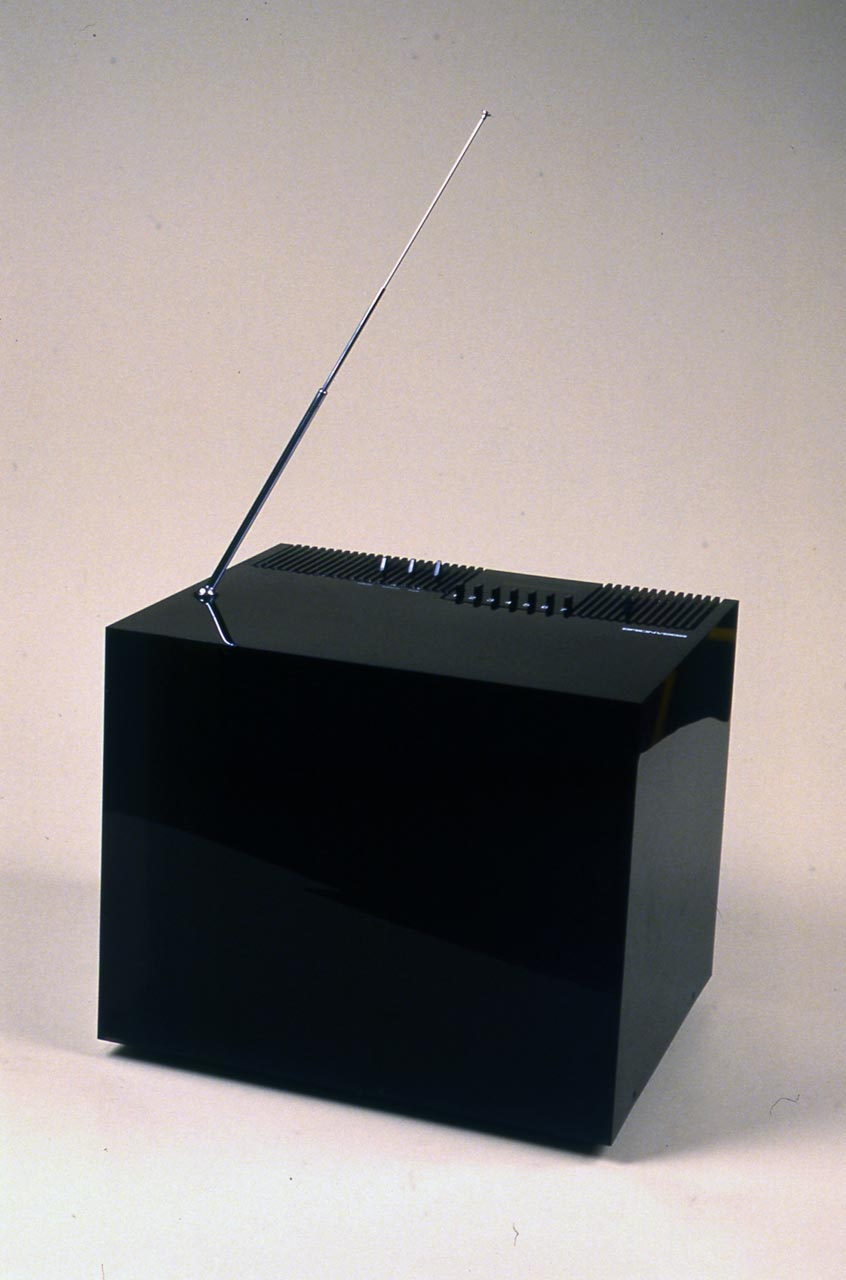
Black ST201 (1969)

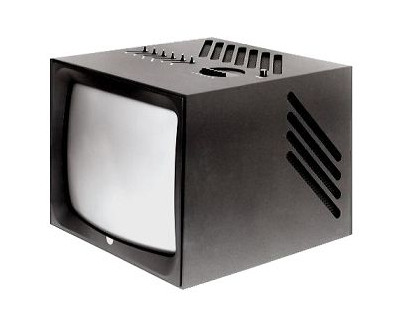
Pally television (1973) (Note: Designed by Sergio Asti)

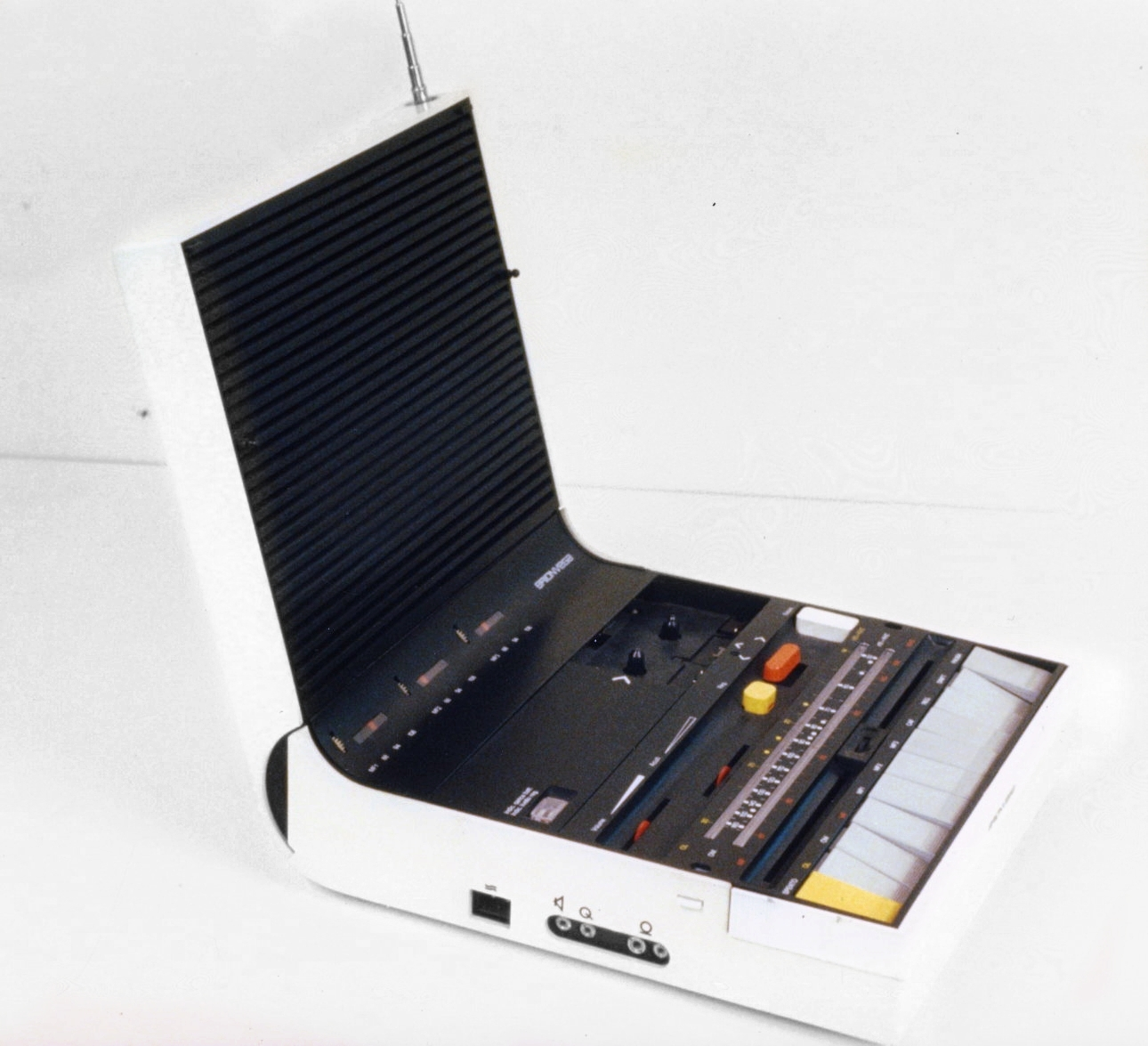
Soundbook portable radio cassette player (1974) (Note: Designed by Richard Sapper)

== Publications ==
- Carugati, Decio Giulio Riccardo (2003). Brionvega. Progetto l'emozione. Milano: Electa. ISBN 978-88-370-2107-8. OCLC 799426220.
- Branzi, Andrea; Hara, Kenya (2016). NEO PREISTORIA 100 Verbi. Triennale di Milano. ISBN 978-88-89861-15-8.

== See also ==
- Brion tomb
- Clamshell design
- List of companies of Italy
