= Luigi Pirotta =

Chief Scout of the Corpo Nazionale Giovani Esploratori ed Esploratrici Italiani
- In office 1944–1954

Luigi Pirotta, Scout name "Volpe Azzurra", meaning "Blue Fox", (June 9, 1900 in Rome – March 29, 1971 in Rome) was an Italian Doctor of Law, archivist and paleographer, who served as Chief Scout of the Corpo Nazionale Giovani Esploratori ed Esploratrici Italiani from 1944 to 1954.

== Background ==
Pirotta was superintendent of the Capitoline Archives and the Biblioteca Nazionale Centrale di Roma, as well as Academician and Deputy Secretary of the Accademia di San Luca. He was an honorary member and corresponding member of the Encyclopædia Britannica.

Pirotta was among the leaders of CNGEI that remained in office until the last minute to send out to the Sections the order of dissolution on 31 March 1927, at the advent of Italian Fascism. At the time, Central Commissioner Pirotta shared this responsibility with the General Secretary Gino Massano and Deputy Chief Scout Carlo Ratti.

Pirotta tried to unite the veteran Scouts in a new association, the Lupercale, the prototype for various groups of Scouts to continue clandestinely, hiding their Scout activities during the period.

In 1929 the Public Safety Authority became suspicious and began an investigation throughout Italy, cataloging the names of all members of the institution, and members were summoned, questioned and searched. Between 1931 and 1932 the police imposed the dissolution of the Lupercal by force. Pirotta, as the primary promoter of Lupercal, was warned by the police and expelled by the Administration of the Governor of Rome in 1933, which from 1928 Pirotta was Deputy Secretary, for offense against the head of government. After nine months of unemployment following a new investigation ordered by the Home Ministry, he was readmitted to service, but lost all seniority and remuneration.

On August 22, 1944, the Scouts were finally restored, and a "Provisional Central Committee" was appointed that reaffirmed Pirotta as National Commissioner. On 4 November 1945 the Assembly of CNGEI delegates to the Fourth Congress of the Body elected Pirotta as National Chief Scout.

As head of the restored CNGEI, Pirotta put into effect several initiatives, appointed a committee to prepare a new constitution, approved and circulated in 1949. He represented the CNGEI in all international Scout conferences, and led the Italian contingents to the 6th World Scout Jamboree in 1947 and the 7th World Scout Jamboree in 1951.
