= Margherita Spampinato =

Italian film director

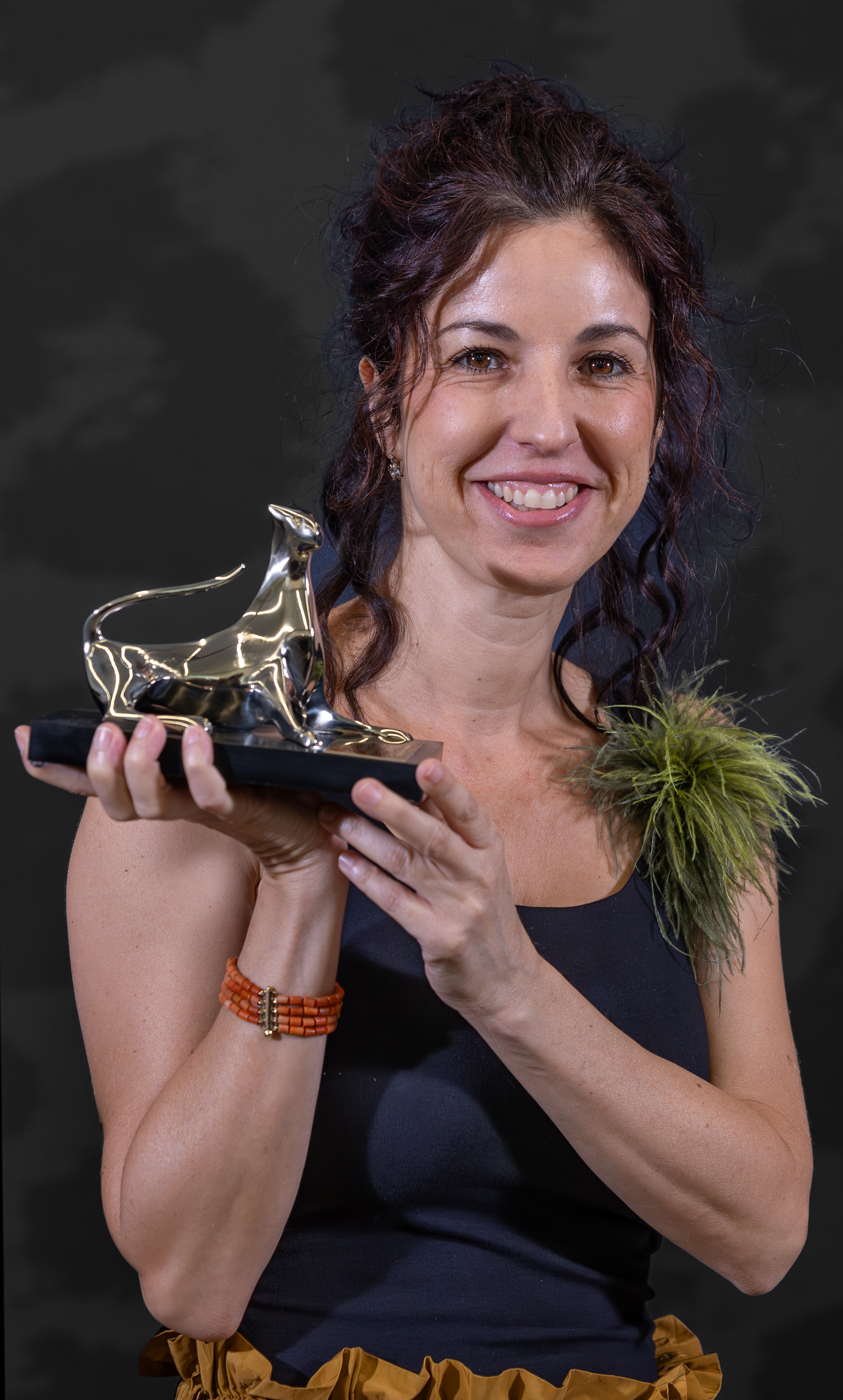
- Spampinato at the 78th Locarno Film Festival, 2025
- Born: Palermo
- Occupation: Film director
- Known for: Sweetheart

Margherita Spampinato (born 1979) is an Italian film director, production secretary and casting assistant.

== Career ==
Margherita Spampinato was born in Palermo in 1979. She moved with her family to Rome, where her mother worked as a doctor. In 2003 Spampinato graduated with a degree in literature and philosophy at the Sapienza University of Rome.

Then she did a one-year internship at production companies S.P.A.C.E. Productions and Chance Productions in Paris. Since 2003, she has served as production secretary on many cinema projects, including Grido by Pippo Delbono, Salty Air by Alessandro Angelini, I Vicerè by Roberto Faenza, The Friends at the Margherita Cafe by Pupi Avati, and many more.

Her 2008 short film Tommasina was selected for the Torino Film Festival.

In 2012, Spampinato released Segreti, a short doc that won the Grand Prix at the 60th Belgrade Documentary and Short Film Festival.

In 2024, her project Gela was selected for L’Atelier di Milano Film Network and won the sound editing tutoring award.

Her feature debut, Sweetheart, was released in 2025 and premiered at the 78th Locarno Film Festival and won the Special Jury Prize in Filmmakers of the Present Competition. The lead actress, Aurora Quattrocchi, received the award for Best Actress. In May 2026, Spampinato won the David di Donatello for Best New Director for the film.

== Filmography ==
=== Director ===
Year	Title	Note	Ref.
2009	Tommasina	Short	
2011	Segreti	Short	
2025	Sweetheart		

=== Production secretary ===
Year	Title	Note	Ref.
2003	Good Morning, Night	Assistant	
2004	Ladri di barzellette		
2004	Il monastero		
2005	El khoubz el hafi		
2005	Musikanten		
2005	In the Fridge for Love		
2006	L'aria salata		
2006	Fascisti su Marte		
2006	Scream		
2007	I Viceré		
2007	A Beautiful Wife		
2008	The Man Who Loves		
2009	Me and Marilyn		
2009	Raise Your Hand		
2009	Gli amici del bar Margherita		
2010	Le quattro volte		
2010	Angel of Evil		
2010	Love & Slaps		
2011	Missione di Pace		
2011	Finalmente la felicità		
2012	Twice Born		
2012	The Lithium Conspiracy		
2013	The Mafia Kills Only in Summer		
2013	Un fantastico via vai		
2013	A Small Southern Enterprise		
2013	A Five Star Life		
