= Altivole =

- Comune
- Comune di Altivole
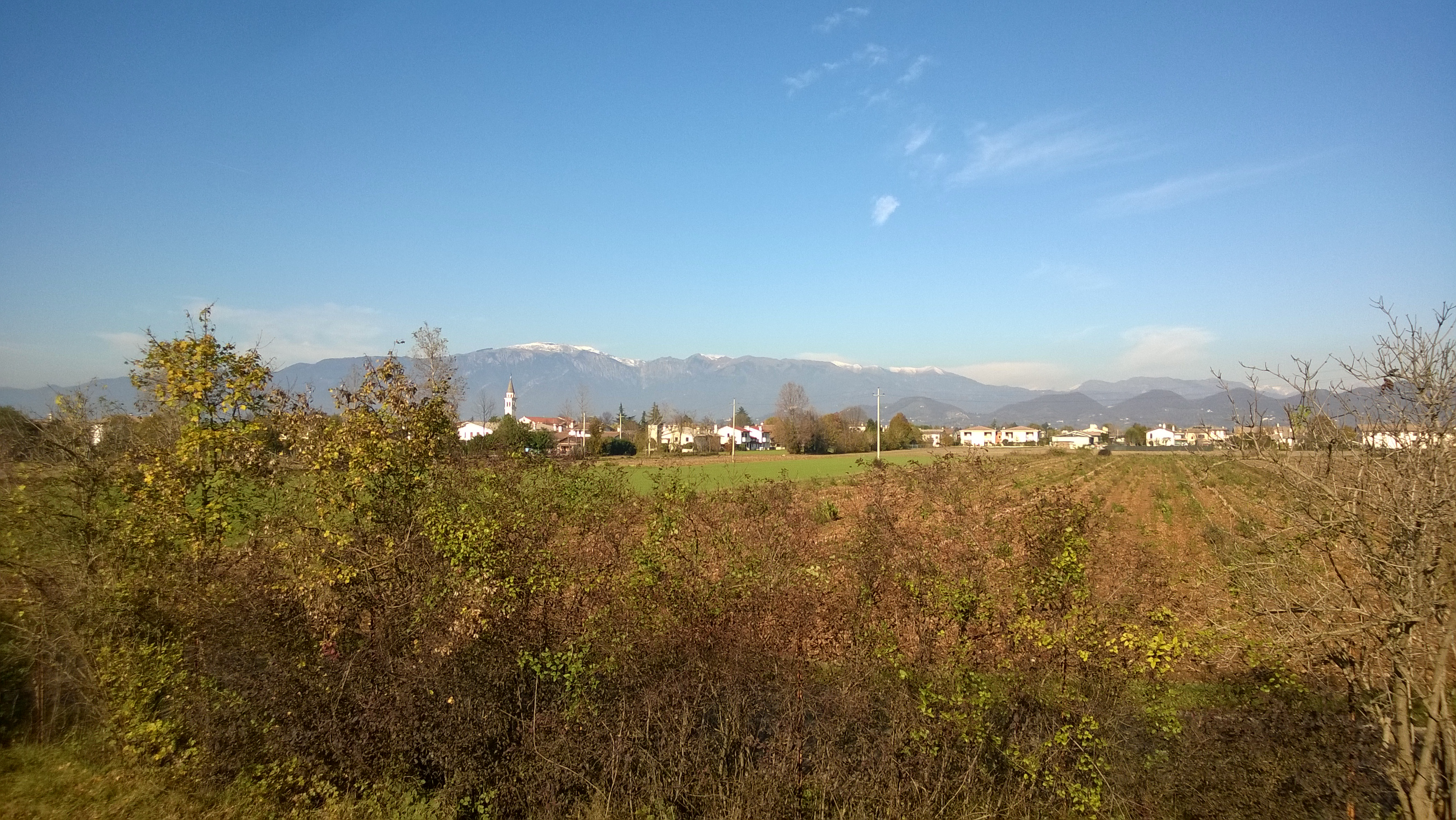
- View of Altivole with Monte Grappa in the background

- Location within Italy Location within Veneto
- Coordinates: 45°45′N 11°57′E
- Country: Italy
- Region: Veneto
- Province: Treviso (TV)
- Frazioni: Caselle, San Vito

Area
  - Total: 21.95 km^{2} (8.47 sq mi)
- Elevation: 88 m (289 ft)

Population (31 October 2023)
  - Total: 7,058
  - Density: 321.5/km^{2} (832.8/sq mi)
- Demonym: Altivolesi
- Time zone: UTC+1 (CET)
  - Summer (DST): UTC+2 (CEST)
- Postal code: 31030
- Dialing code: 0423
- ISTAT code: 026001
- Patron saint: S. Fosca, S. Valentino
- Saint day: 13 and 14 February
- Website: Official website

Altivole is a municipality with 7,058 inhabitants in the province of Treviso and borders the following municipalities: Asolo, Caerano di San Marco, Maser, Montebelluna, Riese Pio X, Vedelago.

== History ==
The first writing mentioning the village dates back to 1297; it mentions the "Capella S. Fusce de Altivolle".

== Monuments and places of interest ==
=== Religious architecture ===
- Parish Church of Altivole Archpriest
- Church of Caselle (architect Francesco Maria Preti) (monumental organ "Antonio Barbini" 1758)
- Parish Church of St. Vitus

=== Civil architectures ===
- Barco della Regina Cornaro: the Barco della Regina Cornaro is a barchessa of a Venetian villa, which until the end of the twentieth century, was told of the years of the lordship of Asolo by Caterina Cornaro (1489–1510) as the barco was only a small part of a large architectural and landscape complex.
- Brion Cemetery a monumental tomb designed by architect Carlo Scarpa, in the frazione of San Vito.

== Society ==
=== Demographic evolution ===
Historical population

Year	Pop.	±%
1861	?	—
1871	2,896	—
1881	3,240	+11.9%
1901	3,545	+9.4%
1911	4,344	+22.5%
1921	4,561	+5.0%

Year	Pop.	±%
1931	4,635	+1.6%
1936	4,741	+2.3%
1951	4,867	+2.7%
1961	4,377	−10.1%
1971	4,302	−1.7%
1981	5,063	+17.7%

Year	Pop.	±%
1991	5,456	+7.8%
2001	6,122	+12.2%
2011	6,730	+9.9%
2021	7,015	+4.2%

Source: Data from ISTAT

=== Foreign Ethnicities and Minorities ===
As of December 31, 2023, there were 683 foreigners residing in the municipality, or 9.7% of the population. The following are the most consistent groups:

1. Romania 289
2. China 208
3. Morocco 27
4. Albania 21
5. Nigeria 15
6. Ucraina 15

== Culture ==
- Events: in June there is the patron saint's festival in San Vito and towards the end of June the festival in Caselle. In August, around the middle of the month, the traditional August festival takes place, which is very famous and renowned in the area. In the summer, guided tours are held on Saturdays and Sundays at Carlo Scarpa's Brion Tomb in San Vito.

== Administration ==
Period		Office holder	Party	Title	Notes
10 June 2024	in office	Dorino Zilio	FdI-Liste civiche	Mayor	

== Sport ==
=== Sports facilities ===
The Pista Verde kart track has been a reference point for enthusiasts since 1988 and is the scene of local and national competitions, contributing to the history of this motor sport.

== See also ==
- Brion Cemetery
