= Vincenzo Pirrotta =

American biologist

Vincenzo Pirrotta (born 1942) is a biologist known for his work on Drosophila and polycomb group proteins. Born in Palermo, Italy, Pirotta migrated to the United States and enrolled at Harvard University. While at Harvard, he obtained undergraduate, graduate, and postdoctoral fellowships in physical chemistry and molecular biology. He later moved to Europe where he began studying gene regulation in bacteriophages and Drosophila (fruit flies). He was appointed assistant professor at the University of Basel in 1972. Pirotta returned to the United States, earning a full professorship at the Baylor College of Medicine in 1992. He then took up the position of professor of zoology at the University of Geneva in 2002, and in 2004 became a distinguished professor of molecular biology and biochemistry at Rutgers University.

== Research ==
Pirrotta is known for his genetic work on Drosophila (fruit flies). He primarily studies polycomb group proteins (PcG), which he began studying when he moved to Geneva University. Polycomb group proteins are protein complexes that change the shape of chromatin, which causes heritable phenotypical changes in offspring. They do not cause a change in the DNA sequence. The polycomb group proteins along with the trithorax group (trxG) repress and activate Hox genes. Pirrotta studied how response elements of PcG and TrxG effect how the silent and active chromatin are inherited in Drosophila melanogaster. He has also previously worked on identifying recombinant mutations marked by the hs-neo gene.
