= David di Donatello for Best Supporting Actor =

Italian film award

- Country: Italy
- Presented by: Accademia del Cinema Italiano
- First award: 1981 (for performances in films released during the 1980/1981 film season)
- Currently held by: Francesco Di Leva; Notalgia (2024)
- Website: daviddidonatello.it

The David di Donatello Award for Best Supporting Actor (Italian: David di Donatello per il migliore attore non protagonista) is a film award presented by the Accademia del Cinema Italiano (ACI, Academy of Italian Cinema) to recognize the outstanding performance in a supporting role of an actor who has worked within the Italian film industry during the year preceding the ceremony. It has been awarded every year since 1981.

Actors Giuseppe Battiston and Leo Gullotta are the record holders in this category, with three awards each.

== Winners and nominees ==
Below, winners are listed first in the colored row, followed by other nominees.

=== 1980s ===
Year	Actor	Role(s)	Film	Ref.
1980/81 (26th)
1980/81 (26th)	Charles Vanel	Donato Giuranna	Three Brothers	
1980/81 (26th)	Bruno Ganz	Count of Perrigaux	The Lady of the Camellias	
1980/81 (26th)	Néstor Garay	Cesare De Blasi	Camera d'albergo	
1981/82 (27th)
1981/82 (27th)	Angelo Infanti	Manuel Fantoni	Talcum Powder	
1981/82 (27th)	Alessandro Haber	Father	Sweet Pea	
1981/82 (27th)	Paolo Stoppa	Pope Pius VII	Il marchese del Grillo	
1982/83 (28th)
1982/83 (28th)	Lello Arena	Tonino	Scusate il ritardo	
1982/83 (28th)	Tino Schirinzi	Nicolino	Sciopèn	
1982/83 (28th)	Paolo Stoppa	Savino Capogreco	All My Friends Part 2	
1983/84 (29th)
1983/84 (29th)	Carlo Giuffrè	Falcone	Son contento	
1983/84 (29th)	Aldo Giuffrè	Cocò	Where's Picone?	
1983/84 (29th)	Stefano Satta Flores	Captain Ferrara	One Hundred Days in Palermo	
1984/85 (30th)
1984/85 (30th)	Ricky Tognazzi	Michele Orcini	Aurora	
1984/85 (30th)	Paolo Bonacelli	Leonardo da Vinci	Nothing Left to Do But Cry	
1984/85 (30th)	Ruggero Raimondi	Escamillo	Carmen	
1985/86 (31st)
1985/86 (31st)	Bernard Blier	Uncle Gugo	Let's Hope It's a Girl	
1985/86 (31st)	Ferruccio De Ceresa	Giulio's father	The Mass Is Ended	
1985/86 (31st)	Franco Fabrizi	Television host	Ginger and Fred	
1985/86 (31st)	Philippe Noiret	Leonardo	Let's Hope It's a Girl	
1986/87 (32nd)
1986/87 (32nd)	Leo Gullotta	Commissioner Iervolino	The Professor	
1986/87 (32nd)	Justino Díaz	Iago	Otello	
1986/87 (32nd)	Gigi Reder	Filini	Superfantozzi	
1986/87 (32nd)	Mattia Sbragia	1st Brigadist	The Moro Affair	
1987/88 (33rd)
1987/88 (33rd)	Peter O'Toole	Reginald Fleming Johnston	The Last Emperor	
1987/88 (33rd)	Galeazzo Benti	Sironi	Io e mia sorella	
1987/88 (33rd)	Gabriele Ferzetti	Paolo's father	Julia and Julia	
1988/89 (34th)
1988/89 (34th)	Carlo Croccolo	Rafele	'O Re	
1988/89 (34th)	Massimo Dapporto	Aldo	Mignon Has Come to Stay	
1988/89 (34th)	Paolo Panelli	Paolo	Splendor	

=== 1990s ===
Year	Actor	Role(s)	Film	Ref.
1989/90 (35th)
1989/90 (35th)	Sergio Castellitto	Quinto	Tre colonne in cronaca	
1989/90 (35th)	Vittorio Caprioli	Psychoanalyst	Dark Illness	
1989/90 (35th)	Roberto Citran	Giuliano	Little Misunderstandings	
1989/90 (35th)	Ennio Fantastichini	Tommaso Scalia	Open Doors	
1989/90 (35th)	Alessandro Haber	Ugo Signori	Willy Signori e vengo da lontano	
1990/91 (36th)
1990/91 (36th)	Ciccio Ingrassia	Marshal Gaetano Scarfi	Condominio	
1990/91 (36th)	Enzo Cannavale	Lawyer	The House of Smiles	
1990/91 (36th)	Sergio Castellitto	Filippo	Stasera a casa di Alice	
1990/91 (36th)	Giuseppe Cederna	Antonio Farina	Mediterraneo	
1990/91 (36th)	Ricky Memphis	Red	Ultrà	
1991/92 (37th)
1991/92 (37th)	Angelo Orlando	Amedeo	Pensavo fosse amore, invece era un calesse	
1991/92 (37th)	Giancarlo Dettori	Attilio	Damned the Day I Met You	
1991/92 (37th)	Giorgio Gaber	Domenico Barbaia	Rossini! Rossini!	
1992/93 (38th)
1992/93 (38th)	Claudio Amendola	Mauro	Un'altra vita	
1992/93 (38th)	Renato Carpentieri	Old Massimo	Fiorile	
1992/93 (38th)	Leo Gullotta	Polizzi	The Escort	
1993/94 (39th)
1993/94 (39th)	Alessandro Haber	Socrates	For Love, Only for Love	
1993/94 (39th)	Giancarlo Giannini	Paolo Borsellino	Giovanni Falcone	
1993/94 (39th)	Leopoldo Trieste	Livatino's father	Law of Courage	
1994/95 (40th)
1994/95 (40th)	Giancarlo Giannini	Pietro Fraschini	Like Two Crocodiles	
1994/95 (40th)	Roberto Citran	Loris	The Bull	
1994/95 (40th)	Philippe Noiret	Pablo Neruda	Il Postino: The Postman	
1995/96 (41st)
1995/96 (41st)	Leopoldo Trieste	The Mute	The Star Maker	
1995/96 (41st)	Raul Bova	Nino Di Venanzio	Palermo - Milan One Way	
1995/96 (41st)	Alessandro Haber	Professor Galliano	The Graduates	
1996/97 (42nd)
1996/97 (42nd)	Leo Gullotta	Carlo Gabbiadini	The Game Bag	
1996/97 (42nd)	Diego Abatantuono	Solo	Nirvana	
1996/97 (42nd)	Antonio Albanese	Antonio	Vesna Goes Fast	
1996/97 (42nd)	Claudio Amendola	Sandro Nardella	An Eyewitness Account	
1996/97 (42nd)	Massimo Ceccherini	Libero Quarini	The Cyclone	
1997/98 (43rd)
1997/98 (43rd)	Silvio Orlando	Himself	April	
1997/98 (43rd)	Sergio Bustric	Ferruccio Papini	Life Is Beautiful	
1997/98 (43rd)	Massimo Ceccherini	Germano	Fuochi d'artificio	
1998/99 (44th)
1998/99 (44th)	Fabrizio Bentivoglio	Antonio	Of Lost Love	
1998/99 (44th)	Mario Scaccia	Old Ferdinand I of the Two Sicilies	Ferdinando and Carolina	
1998/99 (44th)	Emilio Solfrizzi	Sergio	Marriages	

=== 2000s ===
Year	Actor	Role(s)	Film	Ref.
1999/00 (45th)
1999/00 (45th)	Giuseppe Battiston	Costantino Caponangeli	Bread and Tulips	
1999/00 (45th)	Leo Gullotta	Giovanni Pandico	A Respectable Man	
1999/00 (45th)	Emilio Solfrizzi	Lojacono	Outlaw	
2000/01 (46th)
2000/01 (46th)	Tony Sperandeo	Gaetano Badalamenti	One Hundred Steps	
2000/01 (46th)	Silvio Orlando	Oscar	The Son's Room	
2000/01 (46th)	Claudio Santamaria	Paolo	The Last Kiss	
2001/02 (47th)
2001/02 (47th)	Libero De Rienzo	Bartolomeo 'Bart' Vanzetti	Santa Maradona	
2001/02 (47th)	Leo Gullotta	Eng. Mario Pancini	Vajont	
2001/02 (47th)	Silvio Orlando	Saverio	Light of My Eyes	
2002/03 (48th)
2002/03 (48th)	Ernesto Mahieux	Peppino Profeta	The Embalmer	
2002/03 (48th)	Antonio Catania	Ernesto	It Can't Be All Our Fault	
2002/03 (48th)	Pierfrancesco Favino	Sergeant Rizzo	El Alamein: The Line of Fire	
2002/03 (48th)	Giancarlo Giannini	Cesare Balocchi	Incantato	
2002/03 (48th)	Kim Rossi Stuart	Candlewick	Pinocchio	
2003/04 (49th)
2003/04 (49th)	Roberto Herlitzka	Aldo Moro	Good Morning, Night	
2003/04 (49th)	Diego Abatantuono	Sergio	I'm Not Scared	
2003/04 (49th)	Elio Germano	Manuel	What Will Happen to Us	
2003/04 (49th)	Fabrizio Gifuni	Carlo Tommasi	The Best of Youth	
2003/04 (49th)	Emilio Solfrizzi	Gustavo Torregiani	Agata and the Storm	
2004/05 (50th)
2004/05 (50th)	Carlo Verdone	Goffredo Liguori	Manual of Love	
2004/05 (50th)	Johnny Dorelli	Gianca's father	When Do the Girls Show Up?	
2004/05 (50th)	Silvio Muccino	Tommaso	Manual of Love	
2004/05 (50th)	Raffaele Pisu	Carlo	The Consequences of Love	
2004/05 (50th)	Fabio Troiano	The Angel	After Midnight	
2005/06 (51st)
2005/06 (51st)	Pierfrancesco Favino	The Libanese	Romanzo criminale	
2005/06 (51st)	Giorgio Faletti	Professor Antonio Martinelli	Night Before The Exams	
2005/06 (51st)	Neri Marcorè	Nino Ricci	The Second Wedding Night	
2005/06 (51st)	Nanni Moretti	Himself / Silvio Berlusconi	The Caiman	
2005/06 (51st)	Sergio Rubini	Tonino	Our Land	
2006/07 (52nd)
2006/07 (52nd)	Giorgio Colangeli	Luigi Sparti	Salty Air	
2006/07 (52nd)	Ninetto Davoli	Giovanni	One Out of Two	
2006/07 (52nd)	Ennio Fantastichini	Sergio	Saturn in Opposition	
2006/07 (52nd)	Valerio Mastandrea	Ferrante Papucci	Napoleon and Me	
2006/07 (52nd)	Riccardo Scamarcio	Manico Benassi	My Brother is an Only Child	
2007/08 (53rd)
2007/08 (53rd)	Alessandro Gassmann	Carlo Paladini	Quiet Chaos	
2007/08 (53rd)	Giuseppe Battiston	Vito	Days and Clouds	
2007/08 (53rd)	Fabrizio Gifuni	Corrado Canali	The Girl by the Lake	
2007/08 (53rd)	Ahmed Hafiene	Hassan	The Right Distance	
2007/08 (53rd)	Umberto Orsini	Uncle Lino	The Early Bird Catches the Worm	
2008/09 (54th)
2008/09 (54th)	Giuseppe Battiston	Alberto Nardini	Don't Think About It	
2008/09 (54th)	Claudio Bisio	Sergio	Many Kisses Later	
2008/09 (54th)	Carlo Buccirosso	Paolo Cirino Pomicino	Il Divo	
2008/09 (54th)	Luca Lionello	Michele	Cover Boy	
2008/09 (54th)	Filippo Nigro	Remo	Different from Whom?	

=== 2010s ===
Year	Actor	Role(s)	Film	Ref.
2009/10 (55th)
2009/10 (55th)	Ennio Fantastichini	Vincenzo Cantone	Loose Cannons	
2009/10 (55th)	The supporting ensemble of Baarìa		Baarìa	
2009/10 (55th)	Pierfrancesco Favino	Marco	Kiss Me Again	
2009/10 (55th)	Marco Giallini	Luigi Mascolo	Me, Them and Lara	
2009/10 (55th)	Marco Messeri	Loredano 'Loriano' Nesi	The First Beautiful Thing	
2010/11 (56th)
2010/11 (56th)	Giuseppe Battiston	Claudio	La Passione	
2010/11 (56th)	Raoul Bova	Piero	La nostra vita	
2010/11 (56th)	Francesco Di Leva	Edoardo	A Quiet Life	
2010/11 (56th)	Rocco Papaleo	Lionello Frustace	Escort in Love	
2010/11 (56th)	Alessandro Siani	Mattia Volpe	Benvenuti al Sud	
2011/12 (57th)
2011/12 (57th)	Pierfrancesco Favino	Giuseppe Pinelli	Piazza Fontana: The Italian Conspiracy	
2011/12 (57th)	Giuseppe Battiston	Devis	Shun Li and the Poet	
2011/12 (57th)	Marco Giallini	Mazinga	ACAB - All Cops Are Bastards	
2011/12 (57th)	Fabrizio Gifuni	Aldo Moro	Piazza Fontana: The Italian Conspiracy	
2011/12 (57th)	Renato Scarpa	Cardinal Gregori	We Have a Pope	
2012/13 (58th)
2012/13 (58th)	Valerio Mastandrea	Andrea Bottini	Long Live Freedom	
2012/13 (58th)	Stefano Accorsi	Andrea	A Five Star Life	
2012/13 (58th)	Giuseppe Battiston	Amanzio	Garibaldi's Lovers	
2012/13 (58th)	Marco Giallini	Enzo Brighi	Out of the Blue	
2012/13 (58th)	Claudio Santamaria	Max Flamini	Diaz - Don't Clean Up This Blood	
2013/14 (59th)
2013/14 (59th)	Fabrizio Gifuni	Giovanni Bernaschi	Human Capital	
2013/14 (59th)	Valerio Aprea	Mattia Argeri	I Can Quit Whenever I Want	
2013/14 (59th)	Giuseppe Battiston	Father Weiner	The Chair of Happiness	
2013/14 (59th)	Libero De Rienzo	Bartolomeo Bonelli	I Can Quit Whenever I Want	
2013/14 (59th)	Stefano Fresi	Alberto Petrelli	I Can Quit Whenever I Want	
2013/14 (59th)	Carlo Verdone	Romano	The Great Beauty	
2014/15 (60th)
2014/15 (60th)	Carlo Buccirosso	Vito	The Legendary Giulia and Other Miracles	
2014/15 (60th)	Claudio Amendola	Sergio	The Legendary Giulia and Other Miracles	
2014/15 (60th)	Fabrizio Bentivoglio	Basili	The Invisible Boy	
2014/15 (60th)	Luigi Lo Cascio	Sandro De Luca	An Italian Name	
2014/15 (60th)	Nanni Moretti	Giovanni	Mia madre	
2015 (61st)
2015 (61st)	Luca Marinelli	Fabio Cannizzaro / Zingaro	They Call Me Jeeg	
2015 (61st)	Giuseppe Battiston	Carlo Bernini	The Complexity of Happiness	
2015 (61st)	Fabrizio Bentivoglio	Antonio Zanzotto	The Last Will Be the Last	
2015 (61st)	Valerio Binasco	Sandro	Alaska	
2015 (61st)	Alessandro Borghi	Aureliano Adami / Number 8	Suburra	
2016 (62nd)
2016 (62nd)	Valerio Mastandrea	Ascanio	Fiore	
2016 (62nd)	Roberto De Francesco	Sergio	Le ultime cose	
2016 (62nd)	Ennio Fantastichini	Chief Warden De Caro	La stoffa dei sogni	
2016 (62nd)	Pierfrancesco Favino	Italian Minister of Economy	The Confessions	
2016 (62nd)	Massimiliano Rossi	Peppe	Indivisible	
2017 (63rd)
2017 (63rd)	Giuliano Montaldo	Giorgio Gherarducci	Friends by Chance	
2017 (63rd)	Peppe Barra	Pasquale	Naples in Veils	
2017 (63rd)	Alessandro Borghi	Chicano	Fortunata	
2017 (63rd)	Carlo Buccirosso	Don Vincenzo Strozzalone	Love and Bullets	
2017 (63rd)	Elio Germano	Fabio	Tenderness	
2018 (64th)
2018 (64th)	Edoardo Pesce	Simone	Dogman	
2018 (64th)	Fabrizio Bentivoglio	Santino Recchia	Loro	
2018 (64th)	Ennio Fantastichini	Giuseppe De André	Fabrizio De André - Principe libero	
2018 (64th)	Massimo Ghini	Sandro	There's No Place Like Home	
2018 (64th)	Valerio Mastandrea	Ettore	Euphoria	

=== 2020s ===
Year	Actor	Role(s)	Film	Ref.
2019 (65th)
2019 (65th)	Luigi Lo Cascio	Salvatore Contorno	The Traitor	
2019 (65th)	Carlo Buccirosso	Totò o' Macellaio	5 Is the Perfect Number	
2019 (65th)	Stefano Accorsi	Valerio Fioretti	The Champion	
2019 (65th)	Fabrizio Ferracane	Pippo Calò	The Traitor	
2019 (65th)	Roberto Benigni	Geppetto	Pinocchio	
2020/21 (66th)
2020/21 (66th)	Fabrizio Bentivoglio	Franco Restivo	Rose Island	
2020/21 (66th)	Gabriel Montesi	Amelio Guerrini	Bad Tales	
2020/21 (66th)	Lino Musella	Professor Bernardini	Bad Tales	
2020/21 (66th)	Giuseppe Cederna	Vincenzo Sartori	Hammamet	
2020/21 (66th)	Silvio Orlando	Aldo	The Ties	
2021/22 (67th)
2021/22 (67th)	Eduardo Scarpetta	Vincenzo Scarpetta	The King of Laughter	
2021/22 (67th)	Fabrizio Ferracane	Franco Coletti	The Inner Cage	
2021/22 (67th)	Valerio Mastandrea	Inspector Ginko	Diabolik	
2021/22 (67th)	Toni Servillo	Saverio Schisa	The Hand of God	
2021/22 (67th)	Pietro Castellitto	Cencio	Freaks Out	
2022 (68th)
2022 (68th)	Francesco Di Leva	Don Luigi Rega	Nostalgia	
2022 (68th)	Elio Germano	Ennio Scribani	Lord of the Ants	
2022 (68th)	Fausto Russo Alesi	Francesco Cossiga	Exterior Night	
2022 (68th)	Toni Servillo	Pope Paul VI	Exterior Night	
2022 (68th)	Filippo Timi	Giovanni	The Eight Mountains	
2023 (69th)
2023 (69th)	Elio Germano	Giancarlo Basile	Palazzina Laf	
2023 (69th)	Giorgio Colangeli	Sor Ottorino	There's Still Tomorrow	
2023 (69th)	Adriano Giannini	Vasco	Adagio	
2023 (69th)	Vinicio Marchioni	Nino	There's Still Tomorrow	
2023 (69th)	Silvio Orlando	Ennio	A Brighter Tomorrow	
2024 (70th)
2024 (70th)	Francesco Di Leva	Franco Celeste	Familia	
2024 (70th)	Guido Caprino	Carmine	The Art of Joy	
2024 (70th)	Roberto Citran	Aldo Moro	The Great Ambition	
2024 (70th)	Pierfrancesco Favino	Domenico Garofalo	Naples to New York	
2024 (70th)	Peppe Lanzetta	Cardinal Tesorone	Parthenope	
2025 (71st)
2025 (71st)	Lino Musella	Curiosone	Feeling Better	
2025 (71st)	Francesco Gheghi	Maurizio	40 secondi	
2025 (71st)	Vinicio Marchioni	Giacomo Zagari	Tired of Killing: Autobiography of an Assassin	
2025 (71st)	Fausto Russo Alesi	Gabriele D'Annunzio	Duse	
2025 (71st)	Roberto Citran	Cavalier Fadìga	The Last One for the Road	
2025 (71st)	Andrea Pennacchi	Genio	The Last One for the Road	

== See also ==
- Nastro d'Argento for Best Supporting Actor
- Cinema of Italy
