= 70th David di Donatello =

Italian film award ceremony

- Date: 7 May 2025
- Site: Cinecittà, Rome, Italy
- Hosted by: Elena Sofia Ricci; Mika

Highlights
- Most nominations: The Great Ambition and Parthenope (15)

Television coverage
- Network: Rai 1

The 70th David di Donatello ceremony, presented by the Accademia del Cinema Italiano, was held on 7 May 2025 at Cinecittà Studios in Rome, to honour the best Italian films of 2024. It was hosted by actress Elena Sofia Ricci and singer Mika.

== Winners and nominees ==
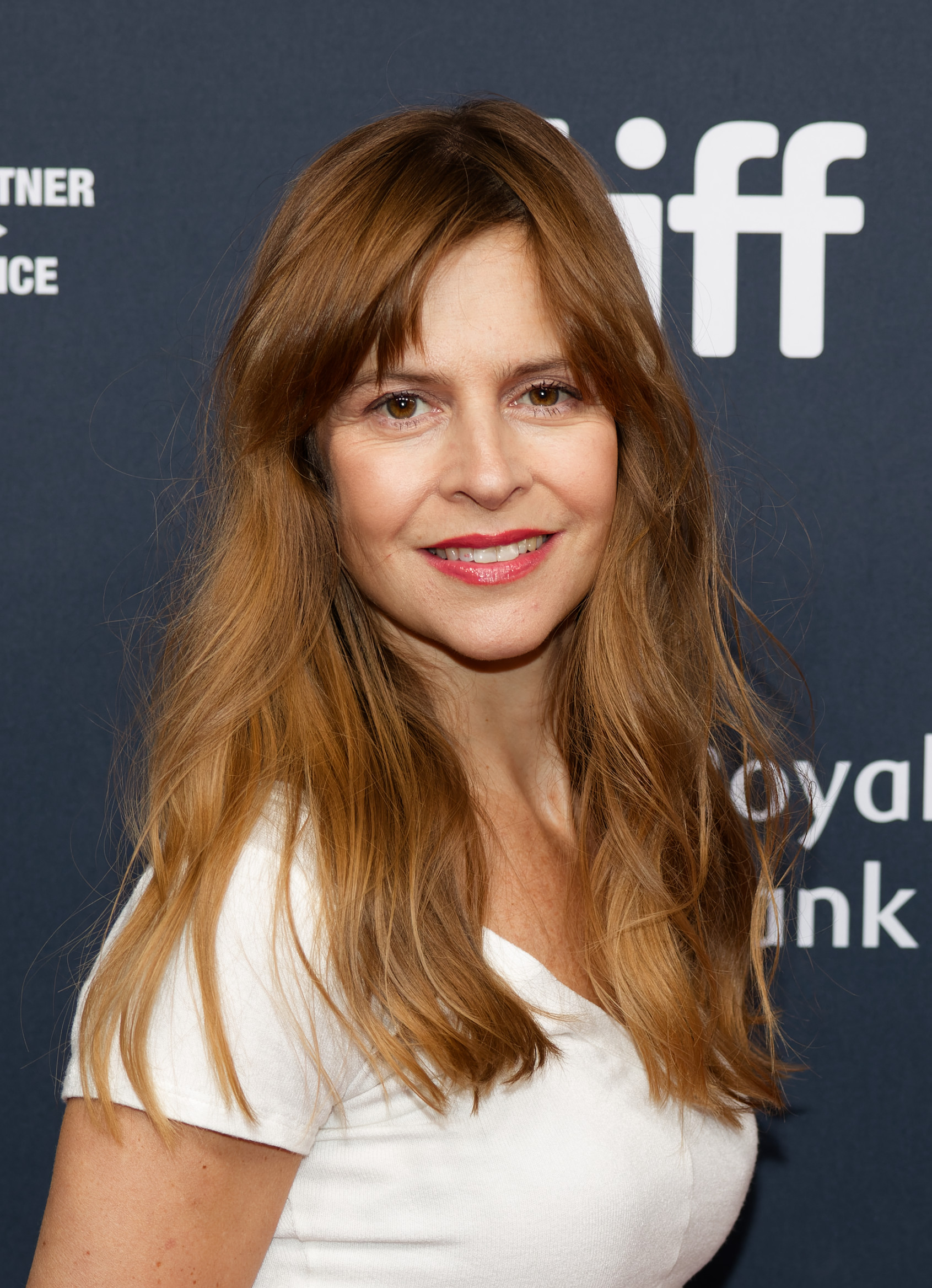
Maura Delpero, Best Director and Best Original Screenplay winner

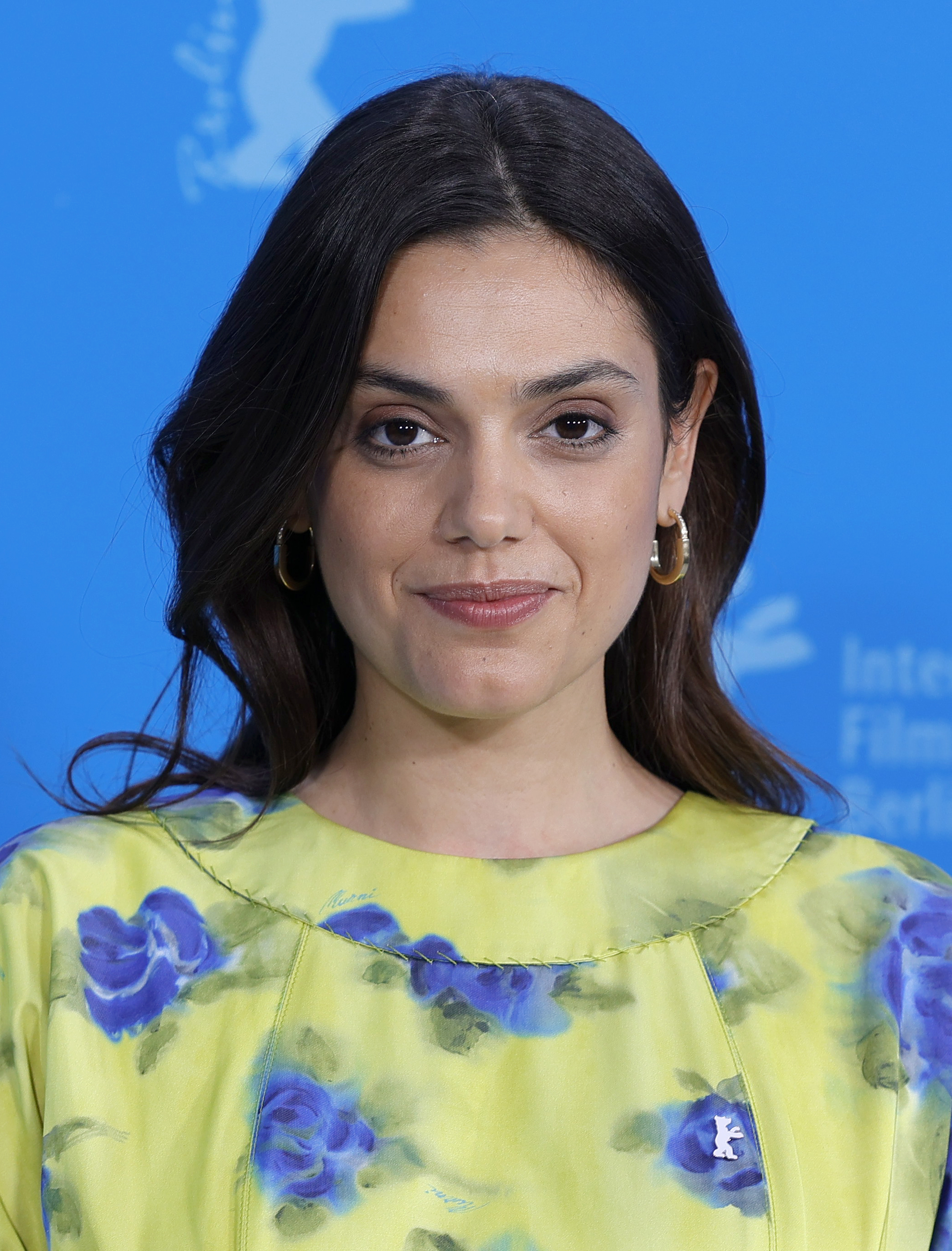
Margherita Vicario, Best Composer, Best Directorial Debut and Best Original Song winner

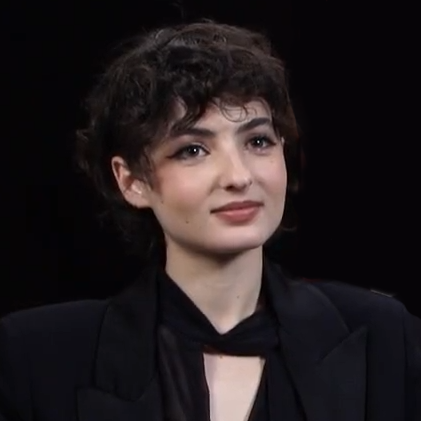
Tecla Insolia, Best Actress winner

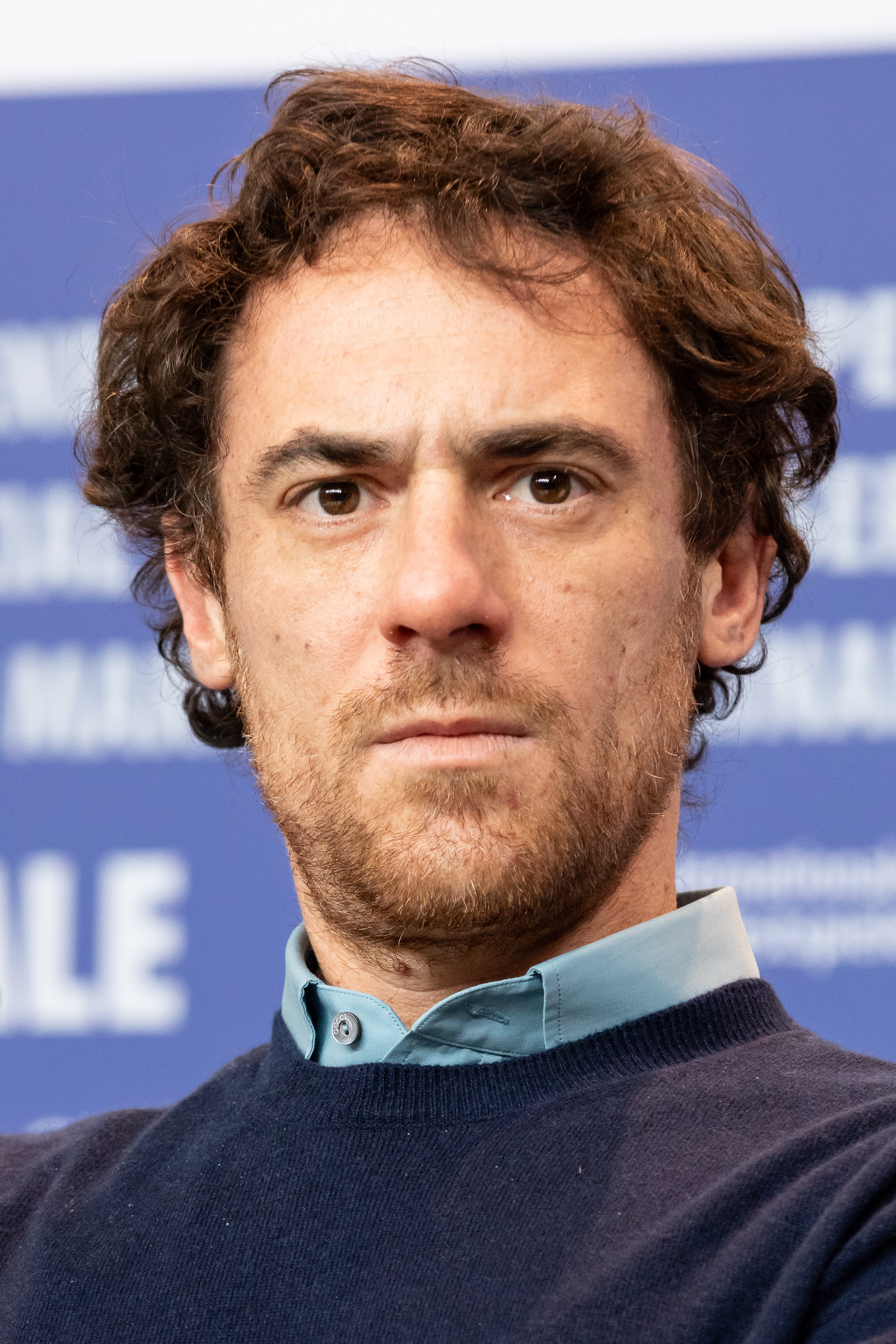
Elio Germano, Best Actor winner

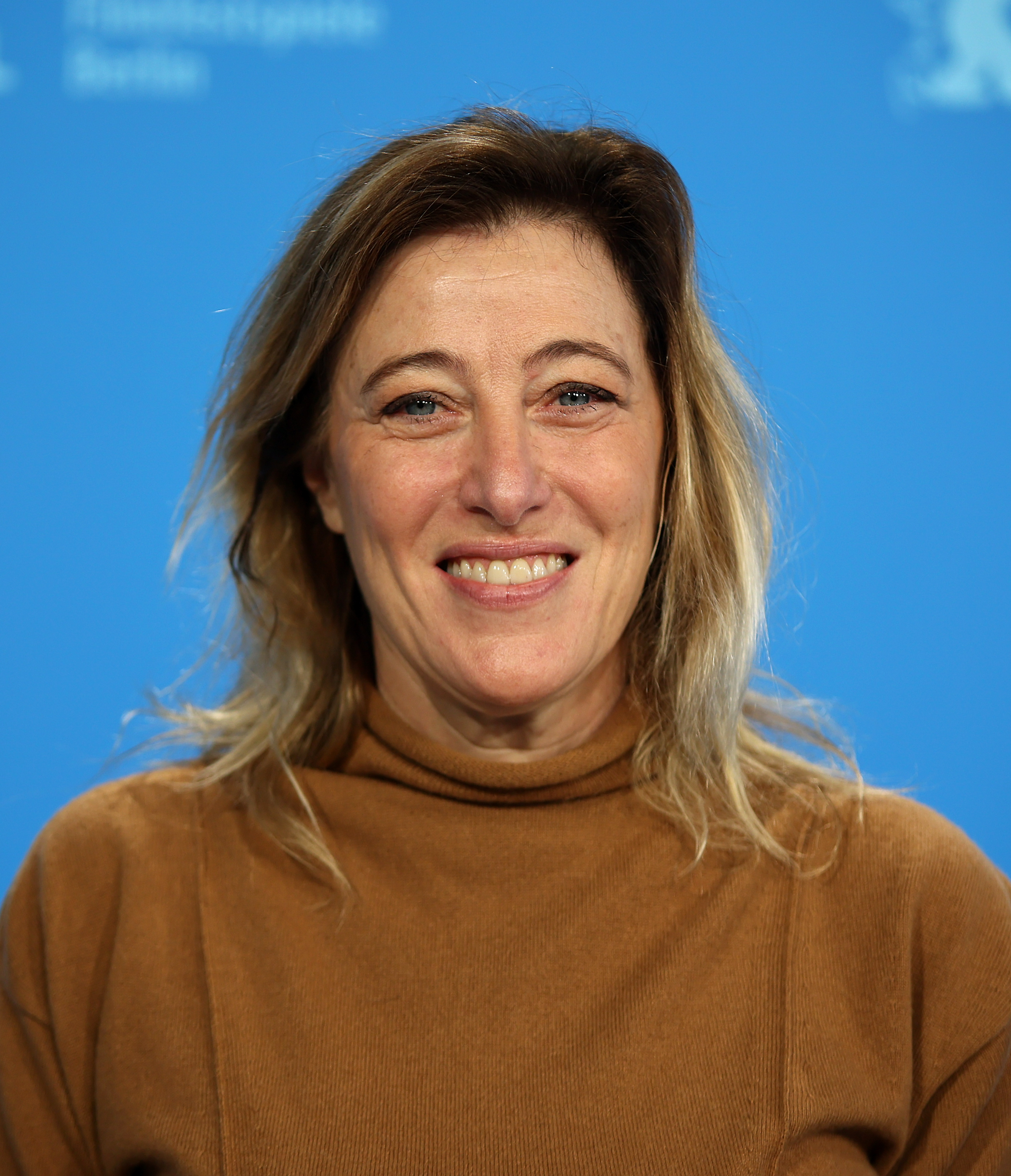
Valeria Bruni Tedeschi, Best Supporting Actress winner

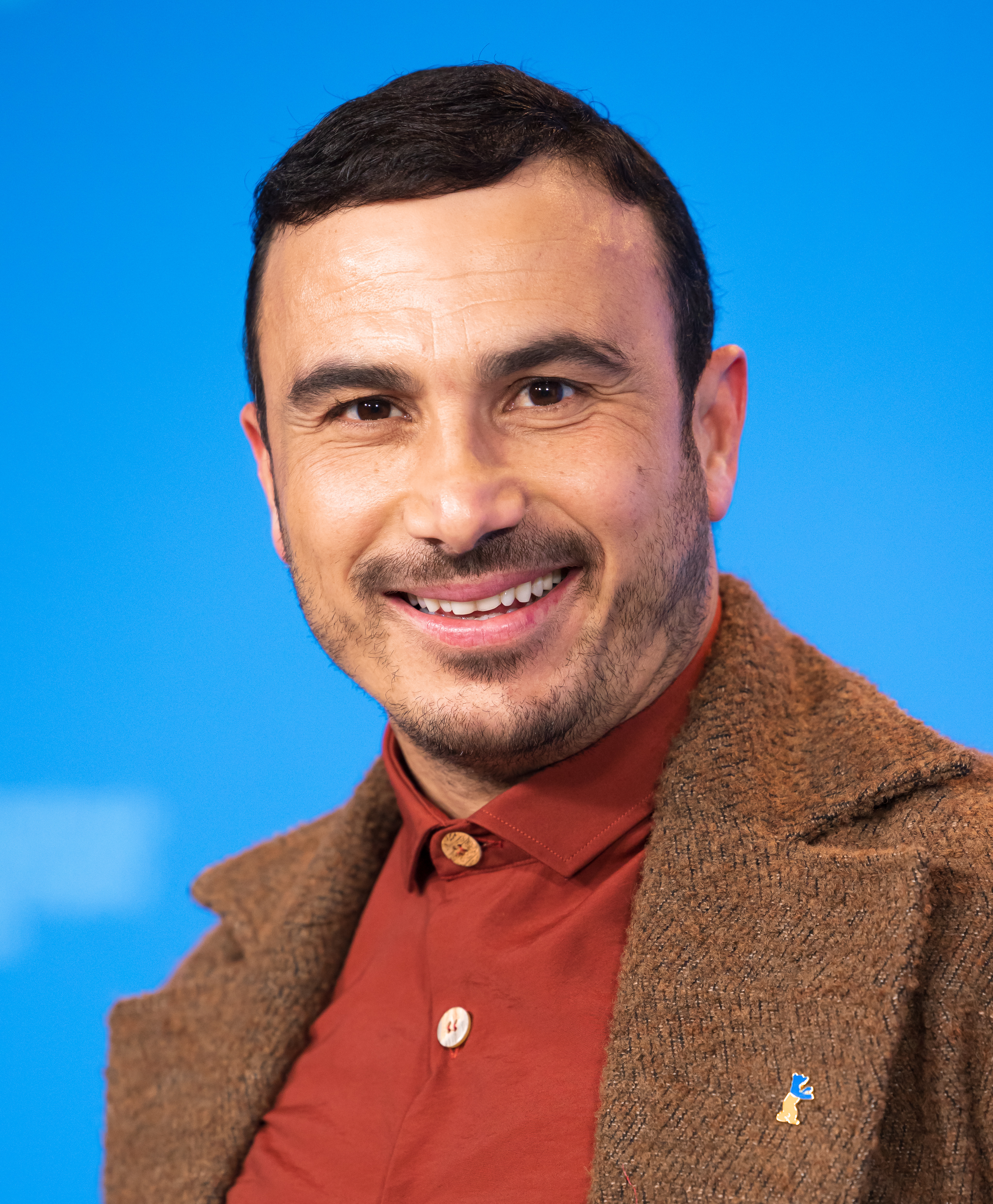
Francesco Di Leva, Best Supporting Actor winner

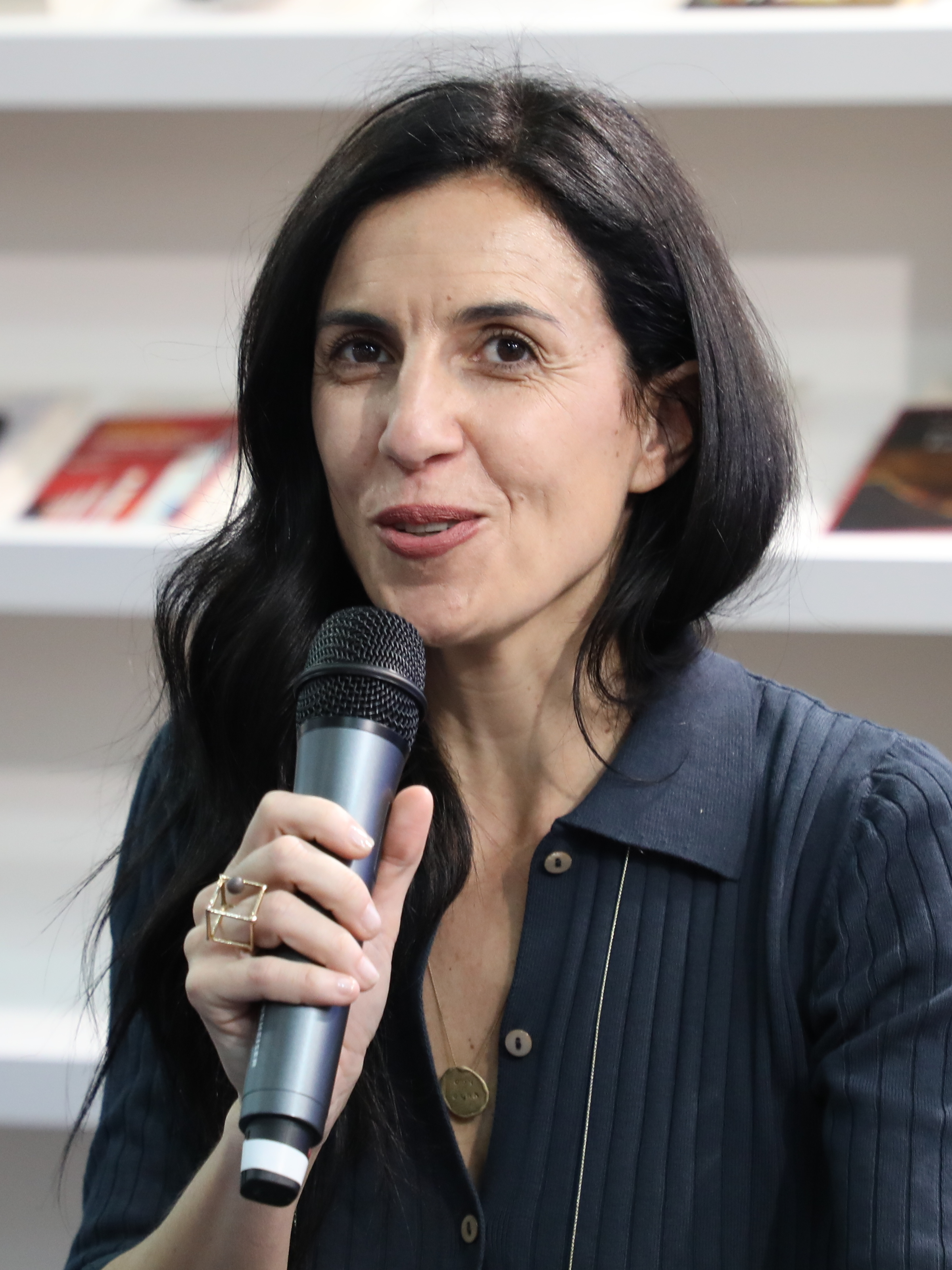
Francesca Mannocchi, Best Documentary winner

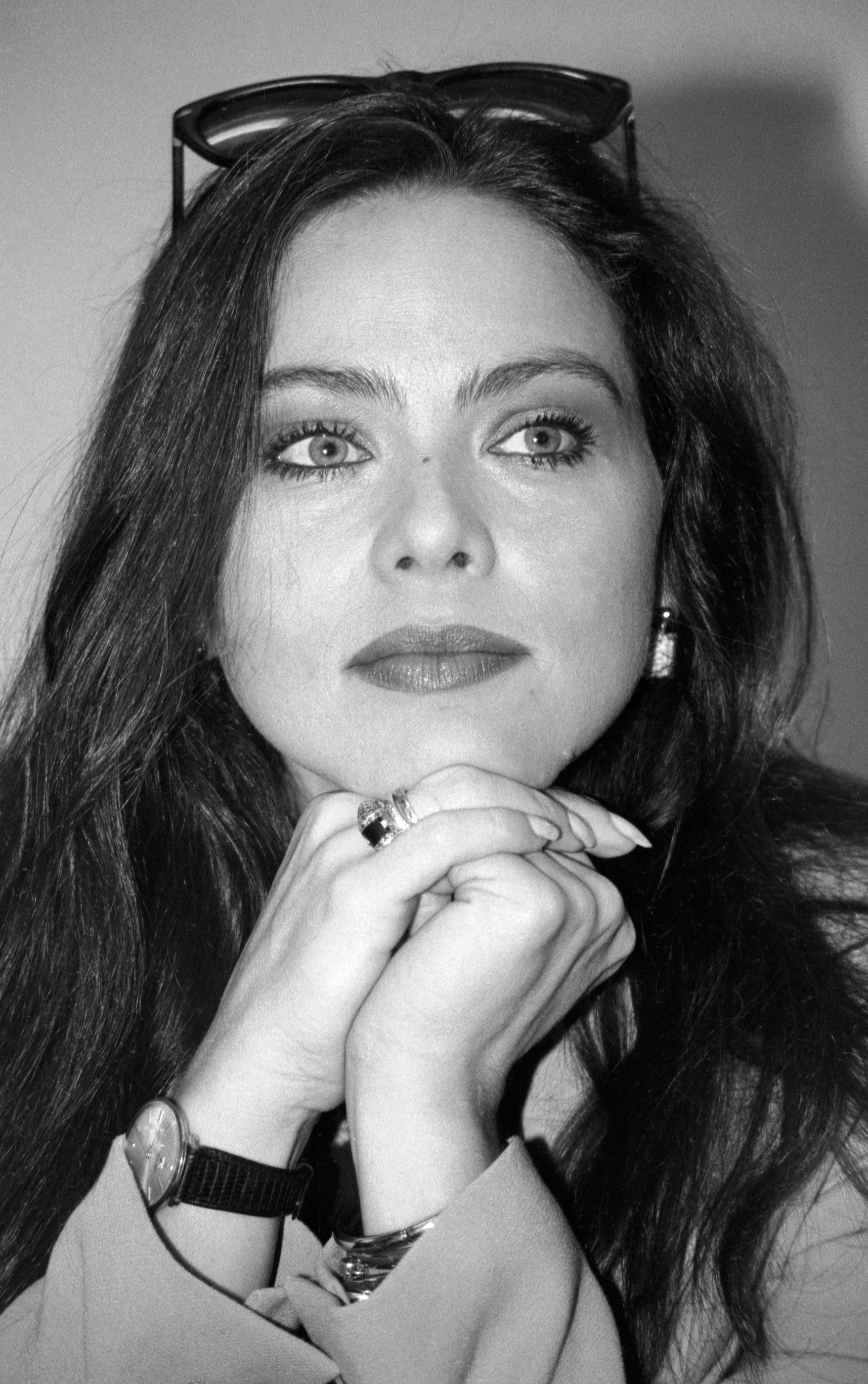
Ornella Muti, Special David recipient

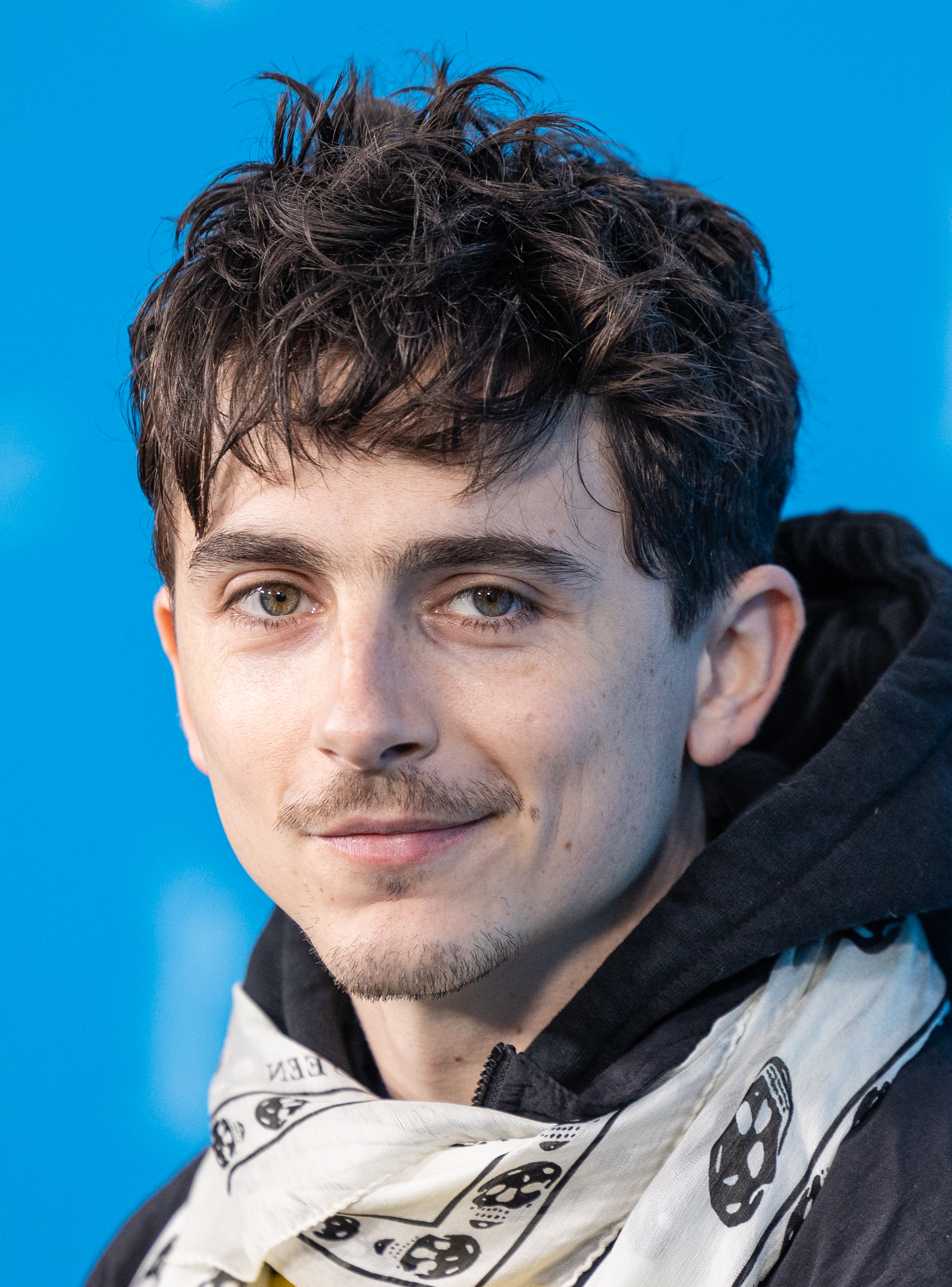
Timothée Chalamet, Special David recipient

The nominations were announced on 7 April 2025. The Great Ambition and Parthenope received the most nominations with fifteen, followed by The Art of Joy and Vermiglio with fourteen. Vermiglio went on to win seven awards, more than any other film in the ceremony, including Best Film.

Winners are listed first, highlighted in boldface, and indicated with a double dagger (‡)

**Best Film**: **Vermiglio – directed by Maura Delpero**; The Art of Joy – directed by Valeria Golino; The Great Ambition – directed by Andrea Segre; Parthenope – directed by Paolo Sorrentino; The Time It Takes – directed by Francesca Comencini	**Best Director**: **Maura Delpero – Vermiglio**; Francesca Comencini – The Time It Takes; Valeria Golino – The Art of Joy; Andrea Segre – The Great Ambition; Paolo Sorrentino – Parthenope
**Best Directorial Debut**: **Margherita Vicario – Gloria!**; Loris Lai – How Kids Roll; Neri Marcorè – Zamora; Edgardo Pistone – Ciao bambino; Gianluca Santoni – My Killer Buddy	**Best Original Screenplay**: **Vermiglio – Maura Delpero**; Gloria! – Anita Rivaroli and Margherita Vicario; The Great Ambition – Marco Pettenello and Andrea Segre; El paraíso – Enrico Maria Artale; Parthenope – Paolo Sorrentino; The Time It Takes – Francesca Comencini
**Best Adapted Screenplay**: **The Art of Joy – Valeria Golino, Luca Infascelli, Francesca Marciano, Valia Santella and Stefano Sardo**; Battlefield – Gianni Amelio and Alberto Taraglio; The Boy with Pink Pants – Roberto Proia; Familia – Adriano Chiarelli, Francesco Costabile and Vittorio Moroni; Naples to New York – Gabriele Salvatores	**Best Producer**: **Vermiglio – Francesca Andreoli, Leonardo Guerra Seràgnoli, Santiago Fondevila Sancet, and Maura Delpero, producers; Cinedora, Charades (France), Rai Cinema, and Versus (Belgium), production companies**; Ciao bambino – Giovanna Crispino, Gianluca Curti, Walter De Majo, Antonella De Martino, Gaetano Di Vaio, Alessandro Elia, Andrea Leone, and Santo Versace, producers; Anemone Film, Bronx Film, Mosaicon Film, Minerva Pictures, production companies; Gloria! – Carlo Cresto-Dina, Valeria Jamonte, Manuela Melissano, and Katrin Renz, producers; Tellfilm and Tempesta, production companies; The Great Ambition – Francesco Bonsembiante, Martichka Bozhilova, Marta Donzelli, Gregorio Paonessa, and Joseph Rouschop, producers; Agitprop, Jolefilm, Rai Cinema, Tarantula, and Vivo Film, production companies; Vittoria – Lorenzo Cioffi, Giorgio Giampà, Nanni Moretti, and Alessandra Stefani, producers
**Best Actress**: **Tecla Insolia – The Art of Joy**; Celeste Dalla Porta – Parthenope; Romana Maggiora Vergano – The Time It Takes; Barbara Ronchi – Familia; Martina Scrinzi – Vermiglio	**Best Actor**: **Elio Germano – The Great Ambition**; Francesco Gheghi – Familia; Fabrizio Gifuni – The Time It Takes; Silvio Orlando – Parthenope; Tommaso Ragno – Vermiglio
**Best Supporting Actress**: **Valeria Bruni Tedeschi – The Art of Joy**; Geppi Cucciari – Diamonds; Tecla Insolia – Familia; Luisa Ranieri – Parthenope; Jasmine Trinca – The Art of Joy	**Best Supporting Actor**: **Francesco Di Leva – Familia**; Guido Caprino – The Art of Joy; Roberto Citran – The Great Ambition; Pierfrancesco Favino – Naples to New York; Peppe Lanzetta – Parthenope
**Best Casting**: **Vermiglio – Maurilio Mangano and Stefania Rodà**; The Art of Joy – Anna Maria Sambucco and Francesco Vedovati; Familia – Anna Pennella; Gloria! – Massimo Appolloni; The Great Ambition – Stefania De Santis	**Best Cinematography**: **Vermiglio – Mikhail Krichman**; The Art of Joy – Fabio Cianchetti; Battlefield – Luan Amelio Ujkaj; Dostoevskij – Matteo Cocco; Hey Joe – Daniele Ciprì; Parthenope – Daria D'Antonio
**Best Composer**: **Gloria! – Margherita Vicario and Davide Pavanello**; The Children's Train – Nicola Piovani; Confidenza – Thom Yorke; The Great Ambition – Iosonouncane; Sicilian Letters – Colapesce	**Best Original Song**: **"Aria!" from Gloria! – Music and lyrics by Margherita Vicario, Davide Pavanello, Edwyn Roberts, Andrea Bonomo and Gianluigi Fazio; Performed by Margherita Vicario**; "Atomos" from Familia – Music and lyrics by Valerio Vigliar; Performed by Greta Zuccoli; "Diamanti" from Diamonds – Music by Giuliano Taviani and Carmelo Travia; Lyrics and performed by Giorgia; "Knife Edge" from Confidenza – Music, lyrics, and performed by Thom Yorke; "La malvagità" from Sicilian Letters – Music, lyrics, and performed by Colapesce
**Production Design**: **The Flood – Production Design: Tonino Zera; Set Decoration: Carlotta Desmann and Maria Grazia Schirripa**; The Art of Joy – Production Design: Luca Merlini; Set Decoration: Giulietta Rimoldi; The Great Ambition – Production Design: Alessandro Vannucci; Set Decoration: Laura Casalini; Parthenope – Production Design: Carmine Guarino; Set Decoration: Iole Autero; Vermiglio – Production Design: Pirra and Vito Giuseppe Zito; Set Decoration: Sara Pergher	**Best Costumes**: **The Flood – Massimo Cantini Parrini**; The Art of Joy – Maria Rita Barbera; Gloria! – Mary Montalto; Parthenope – Carlo Poggioli; Vermiglio – Andrea Cavalletto
**Best Make-up**: **The Flood – Alessandra Vita and Valentina Visintin**; The Art of Joy – Maurizio Fazzini; The Great Ambition – Sara Morlando, Rossella Sicignano, Leonardo Cruciano and Viola Moneta; Parthenope – Paola Gattabrusi and Lorenzo Tamburini; Vermiglio – Frédérique Foglia	**Best Hairstyling**: **The Flood – Aldo Signoretti and Domingo Santoro**; Gloria! – Marta Iacoponi and Carla Indoni; The Great Ambition – Desiree Corridoni; Parthenope – Marco Perna; Vermiglio – Tiziana Argiolas
**Best Editing**: **The Great Ambition – Jacopo Quadri**; The Art of Joy – Giogiò Franchini; Dostoevskij – Walter Fasano; Parthenope – Cristiano Travaglioli; Vermiglio – Luca Mattei	**Best Sound**: **Vermiglio – Dana Farzanehpour, Hervé Guyader and Emmanuel de Boissieu**; Battlefield – Emanuele Cicconi, Alessandro Feletti, Alessandro Giacco and Marco Falloni; Gloria! – Xavier Lavorel, Daniela Bassani, Francois Wolf and Maxence Ciekawy; The Great Ambition – Alessandro Palmerini, Marc Bastien, Vincent Grégorio and Franco Piscopo; Parthenope – Emanuele Cecere, Silvia Moraes, Mirko Perri and Michele Mazzucco
**Best Visual Effects**: **Naples to New York – Víctor Pérez**; The Art of Joy – Francesco Niolu and Rodolfo Migliari; The Great Ambition – Tristan Lilien and Michel Denis; Limonov: The Ballad – Fabio Tomassetti and Daniele Tomassetti; Parthenope – Rodolfo Migliari and Lena Di Gennaro	**Best Documentary**: **Lirica Ucraina – directed by Francesca Mannocchi**; Il cassetto segreto – directed by Costanza Quatriglio; Duse, The Greatest – directed by Sonia Bergamasco; L'occhio della gallina – directed by Antonietta De Lillo; Prima della fine. Gli ultimi giorni di Enrico Berlinguer – directed by directed by Samuele Rossi
**Best Short Film**: **Domenica sera – directed by Matteo Tortone**; La confessione – directed by Nicola Sorcinelli; The Eggregores' Theory – directed by Andrea Gatopoulos; Majonezë – directed by Giulia Grandinetti; La ragazza di Praga – directed by Andree Lucini	**Best International Film**: **Anora (United States) – directed by Sean Baker**; Conclave (United Kingdom / United States) – directed by Edward Berger; Juror No. 2 (United States) – directed by Clint Eastwood; Perfect Days (Japan / Germany) – directed by Wim Wenders; The Zone of Interest (United Kingdom / Poland / United States) – directed by Jonathan Glazer
**Young David**: **Naples to New York – directed by Gabriele Salvatores**; The Boy with Pink Pants – directed by Margherita Ferri; Familia – directed by Francesco Costabile; The Great Ambition – directed by Andrea Segre; The Time It Takes – directed by Francesca Comencini	**Special David**: **Pupi Avati**; **Ornella Muti**; **Timothée Chalamet**
**Audience David**: **Diamonds, directed by Ferzan Özpetek for garnering 2,222,126 spectators**	**Italian Rising Stars**: **Federico Cesari**; **Celeste Dalla Porta**; **Carlotta Gamba**; **Matteo Oscar Giuggioli**; **Tecla Insolia**; **Emanuele Palumbo**
