= Promises (2021 film) =

2021 drama film

- Directed by: Amanda Sthers
- Screenplay by: Amanda Sthers
- Produced by: Fabio Conversi; Marco Cohen; Benedetto Habib; Fabrizio Donvito; Daniel Campos Pavoncelli
- Starring: Kelly Reilly; Jean Reno; Pierfrancesco Favino; Cara Theobold; Leon Hesby; Deepak Verma; Kris Marshall
- Cinematography: Marco Graziaplena
- Edited by: Cristiano Travaglioli
- Music by: Andrea Laszlo De Simone
- Production companies: Barbary Films; Indiana Production; Vision Distribution; Iwaca
- Release date: October 2021 (Rome Film Festival)
- Countries: Italy; France
- Language: English

Promises is a 2021 French-Italian romantic drama film written and directed by Amanda Sthers, based on her novel of the same name. The film stars Kelly Reilly, Jean Reno, Pierfrancesco Favino, Cara Theobold, Deepak Verma, Leon Hesby and Kris Marshall.

== Cast ==
- Kelly Reilly as Laura
- Jean Reno as Grandpa
- Pierfrancesco Favino as Alexander
- Cara Theobold as Jane
- Deepak Verma as Jack
- Kris Marshall as Louis
- Leon Hesby as Young Alexander (16)
- Ethan Hunsinger as young Alexander (10)
- Marie Mouté as Marika

== Production ==
The film is set in Italy and London. Principal photography started in Rome on 22 March 2021 and concluded on 22 April.
