= 40 secondi =

2025 film by Vincenzo Alfieri

- Italian theatrical release poster
- Directed by: Vincenzo Alfieri
- Written by: Vincenzo Alfieri; Giuseppe Stasi
- Based on: 40 secondi. Willy Monteiro Duarte. La luce del coraggio and il buio della violenza by Federica Angeli
- Produced by: Roberto Proia
- Starring: Francesco Gheghi; Enrico Borello; Francesco Di Leva; Beatrice Puccilli; Justin De Vivo
- Cinematography: Andrea Reitano
- Edited by: Vincenzo Alfieri
- Music by: Alessandro Bencini
- Production company: Eagle Pictures
- Distributed by: Eagle Pictures
- Release dates: 17 October 2025 (Rome); 19 November 2025 (Italy)
- Running time: 121 minutes
- Country: Italy
- Language: Italian

40 secondi (English: 40 seconds) is an Italian drama film co-written and directed by Vincenzo Alfieri, loosely based on the book 40 secondi. Willy Monteiro Duarte. La luce del coraggio and il buio della violenza by Federica Angeli. It had its world premiere in the Progressive Cinema Competition of the 20th Rome Film Festival on 17 October 2025, and received a theatrical release in Italy on 19 November 2025.

== Premise ==
The film follows the true story of Willy Monteiro Duarte, a 21-year-old of Cape Verdean descent who was brutally beaten and killed in Colleferro while defending a friend.

== Cast ==
- Francesco Gheghi as Maurizio
- Enrico Borello as Cosimo
- Francesco Di Leva
- Beatrice Puccilli as Michelle
- Giordano Giansanti as Federico
- Luca Petrini as Lorenzo
- Justin De Vivo as Willy Monteiro Duarte
- Sergio Rubini
- Maurizio Lombardi
- Daniele Cartocci as Cristian
- Chiara Celotto as Rossella

== Production ==
Principal photography began on 16 June 2025. Filming took place in and around Rome over seven weeks.

== Release ==
A trailer was released on 22 September 2025. The film had its world premiere in the Progressive Cinema Competition of the 20th Rome Film Festival on 17 October 2025. It received a theatrical release in Italy on 19 November 2025.
