= God Laughs =

2026 comedy-drama film

- Theatrical release poster
- Directed by: Giovanni Veronesi
- Written by: Giovanni Veronesi; Nicola Baldoni; Gianluca Bernardini; Nicola Deorsola; Jean Jacques Llunga; Paolo Portone
- Produced by: Luisa Borella; Daniel Campos Pavoncelli; Marco Cohen; Fabrizio Donvito; Benedetto Habib; Davide Novelli; Massimiliano Orfei
- Starring: Pierfrancesco Favino; Silvio Orlando; Alma Noce; Francesco Gheghi
- Cinematography: Maurizio Calvesi
- Edited by: Patrizio Marone
- Music by: Paolo Buonvino
- Production companies: Indiana Production; PiperFilm
- Distributed by: PiperFilm
- Release dates: 12 September 2026 (Venice); 29 October 2026 (Italy)
- Running time: 114 minutes
- Country: Italy
- Language: Italian

God Laughs (Italian: Dio ride) is a 2026 Italian period comedy-drama film co-written and directed by Giovanni Veronesi. It stars Pierfrancesco Favino, Silvio Orlando, Alma Noce and Francesco Gheghi.

The film had its world premiere as the closing film of the 83rd Venice International Film Festival on 12 September 2026. It was theatrically released by PiperFilm on 29 October.

== Cast ==
- Pierfrancesco Favino as Friar Leopoldo da Casamacchia
- Silvio Orlando as Cardinal Vincenzo Maculani
- Alma Noce as Countess Isabella
- Francesco Gheghi as Friar Giacinto
- Maurizio Lombardi as Friar Monaldo
- Paolo Rossi as the Prior
- Carlo Cecchi as Pope Innocent X
- Lorenzo Frediani as Cosimo del Debbio
- Giselda Volodi as Aita Palmina

== Production ==
The film was produced by Indiana Production and PiperFilm, in association with Ogi Film, and in collaboration with Netflix.

== Release ==
The film had its world premiere out competition at the 83rd Venice International Film Festival, serving as the festival's closing film. It was theatrically released in Italy by PiperFilm on 29 October 2026.

== Reception ==
=== Critical reception ===
The film was generally well received by critics. The Film Verdict's critic Max Borg noted the film's "departure from Veronesi’s usual style", yet "it is precisely when he most explicitly steps outside of his comfort zone that the picture strengthens its position and showcases a cinematic maturity that may take some aback" Jack Walters from Next Best Picture called the film "an unexpected highlight from this year’s Venice Film Festival". Victor Fraga from DMovies noted how the "puerile approach to the topic of religious doctrine and devotion is also its biggest strength" and that "in many ways, Giovanni Veronesi’s movie is as innocent and pure and its protagonist".

Paolo Mereghetti gave the film a rating of 7½, observing that it offers something more and better than a straightforward comedy. Alberto Crespi from la Repubblica called it "a profound and beautiful film", pairing it to Umberto Eco's novel The Name of the Rose and comparing Favino's performance to Dario Fo's in Mistero Buffo.

=== Box office ===
The film topped the Italian box office in its opening week.
