= Familia (2024 film) =

2024 Italian film by Francesco Costabile

- Italian theatrical release poster
- Directed by: Francesco Costabile
- Screenplay by: Francesco Costabile; Vittorio Moroni; Adriano Chiarelli
- Based on: Non sarà sempre così by Luigi Celeste
- Produced by: Attilio De Razza; Nicola Giuliano; Nicola Picone; Pierpaolo Verga
- Starring: Francesco Gheghi; Barbara Ronchi; Francesco Di Leva; Marco Cicalese; Enrico Borello; Tecla Insolia
- Cinematography: Giuseppe Maio
- Edited by: Cristiano Travaglioli
- Music by: Valerio Vigliar
- Production companies: Tramp Limited; Medusa Film; Indigo Film; O'Groove
- Distributed by: Medusa Film; True Colours
- Release dates: 1 September 2024 (Venice); 2 October 2024 (Italy)
- Running time: 124 minutes
- Country: Italy
- Language: Italian
- Budget: €2,747,000
- Box office: $421,150

Familia (lit. 'Family') (Note: Familia is the Latin translation of family; the film's title refers to ancient Roman households. The Italian translation of family is famiglia.) is a 2024 Italian psychological drama film directed by Francesco Costabile, co-written by Costabile, Vittorio Moroni, and Andriano Chiarelli, based on the 2017 memoir Non sarà sempre così by Luigi Celeste. It follows Gigi (Francesco Gheghi), a young far-right militant from a modest Italian working class family shattered by domestic violence, living in the shadow of his criminal father (Francesco Di Leva) and trying to find peace for his mother, Licia (Barbara Ronchi).

The film had its world premiere in the Orizzonti section of the 81st Venice International Film Festival on 1 September 2024, where Gheghi won the Orizzonti Award for Best Actor. It was theatrically released in Italy by Medusa Film on 2 October 2024, and was received with critical acclaim by Italian critics, specially for its acting ensemble. At the 70th David di Donatello, Francesco Di Leva won for Best Supporting Actor, and the film was nominated for Best Actor (Gheghi), and Best Actress (Ronchi), among other categories.

It was selected as the Italian entry for Best International Feature Film at the 98th Academy Awards, but it was not nominated.

== Cast ==
- Francesco Gheghi as Luigi "Gigi" Celeste
  - Francesco De Lucia as young Luigi
- Barbara Ronchi as Licia Licino, Gigi's mother
- Francesco Di Leva as Franco Celeste, Gigi's father
- Marco Cicalese as Alessandro Celeste, Gigi's brother
  - Stefano Valentini as young Alessandro
- Enrico Borello as Fulvio
- Tecla Insolia as Giulia, Gigi's girlfriend

== Production ==
Director Francesco Costabile was inspired to direct the film after reading Luigi Celeste's memoir, Non sarà sempre così. Costabile intentionally named the film after the Latin word familia, stating, "I was struck by the Latin desinence of the term familia, a word that should represent the place of love and inclusion, but in Latin it recalls the contract of domination of the pater familias with his servants, among whom were also his wife and children."

Principal photography took place in Rome, specifically in Monte Sacro and Tufello, in spring 2024.

== Release ==
The trailer was released in August 2024. The film premiered at the 81st Venice International Film Festival on 1 September 2024 as part of the Orizzonti competition. Luigi Celeste, on whom the film is based, attended the premiere.

It received a theatrical release in Italy on 2 October 2024.

== Reception ==
Federico Pontiggia of Cinematografo.it gave the film three out of five stars, calling it "a solid family thriller, well shot, acted and scored, further from infamy than praise."

Damiano Panattoni of Movieplayer.it also gave the film three out of five stars, commending the casts' performances, specifically that of Francesco Gheghi, and Costabile's direction.

William Stottor of Loud and Clear Reviews gave the film four out of five stars, writing, "Francesco Costabile's stunning drama Familia can be scattered and messy, but overall it is a loaded, subtle, and haunting look at domestic abuse."

Piera Detassis of Elle Italia called the film "beautiful, a blow to the stomach, but above all to the heart", and commended the acting performances of the entire cast.

== Awards and nominations ==
Award	Year	Category	Recipient(s)	Result	Ref.
David di Donatello	2025	Best Adapted Screenplay	Francesco Costabile, Vittorio Moroni, Adriano Chiarelli	Nominated	
David di Donatello	2025	Best Actor	Francesco Gheghi	Nominated	
David di Donatello	2025	Best Actress	Barbara Ronchi	Nominated	
David di Donatello	2025	Best Supporting Actor	Francesco Di Leva	Won	
David di Donatello	2025	Best Supporting Actress	Tecla Insolia	Nominated	
David di Donatello	2025	Best Casting	Anna Pennella	Nominated	
David di Donatello	2025	Best Original Song	"Atoms" – Valerio Vigliar and Greta Zuccoli	Nominated	
David di Donatello	2025	Young David	Familia	Nominated	
Nastri d'Argento	2025	Best Director	Francesco Costabile	Nominated	
Nastri d'Argento	2025	Best Supporting Actor	Francesco Di Leva	Won	
Nastri d'Argento	2025	Best Casting Director	Anna Pennella	Nominated	
Nastri d'Argento	2025	Best Editing	Cristiano Travaglioli	Won	
Nastri d'Argento	2025	Best Sound	Gianluca Costamagna	Nominated	
Nastri d'Argento	2025	Premio BNL BNP Paribas	Familia	Won	
Nastri d'Argento	2025	Premio Guglielmo Biraghi	Francesco Gheghi	Won	
Venice Film Festival	2024	Orizzonti Award for Best Film	Familia	Nominated	
Venice Film Festival	2024	Orizzonti Award for Best Actor	Francesco Gheghi	Won	

== See also ==
- List of submissions to the 98th Academy Awards for Best International Feature Film
- List of Italian submissions for the Academy Award for Best International Feature Film
