= Adagio (2023 film) =

2023 Italian drama film

- Directed by: Stefano Sollima
- Written by: Stefano Bises; Stefano Sollima
- Produced by: Lorenzo Mieli; Stefano Sollima
- Starring: Pierfrancesco Favino; Toni Servillo; Valerio Mastandrea; Adriano Giannini
- Cinematography: Paolo Carnera
- Production companies: The Apartment Pictures; AlterEgo
- Distributed by: Vision Distribution (Theatrical); Netflix (streaming)
- Release dates: 2 September 2023 (Venice); 14 December 2023 (Italy); 13 May 2024 (Netflix)
- Running time: 127 minutes
- Country: Italy
- Language: Italian
- Box office: $1.2 million

Adagio is a 2023 Italian crime drama film directed by Stefano Sollima from a screenplay by Sollima and Stefano Bises, and starring Pierfrancesco Favino, Toni Servillo and Valerio Mastandrea. The film concludes Sollima's trilogy about crime in Rome, preceded by ACAB (2012) and Suburra (2015).

The film was selected to compete for the Golden Lion at the 80th Venice International Film Festival, where it had its world premiere on 2 September 2023. It was released theatrically in Italy on 14 December 2023.

== Plot ==
The film shows 24 hours in Rome decimated by fires and blackouts. Manuel, a 16 year-old-boy, infiltrates a gay sex party where alcohol and drugs are in circulation and openly used. His task is to incriminate a minister present there with exploitation of child prostitution. While filming his target, however, he realizes that the building has some hidden cameras and, shocked by the idea that shortly before he has been filmed snorting cocaine, runs away.

The person who gave him that task is Vasco, a corrupt policeman commissioned to obtain compromising material by some high-ranking people in exchange for money. Following Manuel's escape, he begins to hunt him down. Manuel takes refuge with Polniuman, an old friend of his father Daytona and, like the latter, a former member of the Magliana gang. The man, now blind, agrees to help the boy and sends him to Cammello, another old acquaintance with knowledge of Roman crime recently released from prison on the grounds of his terminal illness. Cammello, however, chases Manuel away, preferring to enjoy his last days of life with his wife.

Vasco tracks down Polniuman's home through signal from Manuel's mobile phone, and the two end up shooting each other. Polniuman is badly injured and Vasco strangles him dead.

At Manuel's insistence the next day, Cammello finds him a temporary bed on his terrace and then meets up with Daytona, now suffering from dementia. Daytona confronts Vasco and is kidnapped by the latter, and Vasco then kills him. Having consulted the files linking Daytona to Cammello, Vasco places a transceiver under the table in Cammello's apartment.

Manuel finds his house under observation by Vasco's colleagues and returns to Cammello's residence. The latter decides to accompany the former to a train station so that Manuel could leave the city. En route Manuel tells Cammello that Vasco photographed Manuel performing fellatio on another adult in exchange for money and thus gained leverage over the boy, blackmailing him into infiltrating the sex party and filming the minister.

Cammello returns home, discovers the transceiver there and then goes to Tiburtina station, which is in chaos after many train cancellations due to fires. There he finds Vasco and Bruno looking for Manuel. Cammello is killed in the ensuing shoot-out; Vasco is mortally wounded in the neck and dies shortly after.

At the police station, Manuel sees on television reports of the politician filmed at the orgy refusing to resign, due to a lack of evidence corroborating rumors of possible sex scandals. Meeting one of Vasco's sons, Manuel gives him his headphones. Outside on the city streets, the blackouts and fires continue.

In the closing credits, it is revealed that corpses of Polniuman and Cammello are taken to the morgue, while Daytona's body ends up crushed to pulp in a junkyard inside the car in which he has been locked.

== Cast ==
- Pierfrancesco Favino as Cammello
- Toni Servillo as Daytona
- Valerio Mastandrea as Polniuman
- Adriano Giannini as Vasco
- Gianmarco Franchini as Manuel
- Francesco Di Leva as Bruno

== Production ==
Adagio is the final installment of Sollima's Roman crime trilogy, following his 2012 film ACAB – All Cops Are Bastards and Suburra in 2015.

The film was co-produced by The Apartment Pictures, AlterEgo and Vision Distribution, with collaboration from Sky Italia and Netflix.

Principal photography began on 5 September 2022 in Rome.

== Release ==
The film premiered in-competition at the 80th Venice International Film Festival on 2 September 2023. It was also invited at the 28th Busan International Film Festival in 'World Cinema' section, where it was screened on 7 October 2023.

Adagio was released in Italian cinemas by Vision Distribution on 14 December 2023, followed by theatrical release in Germany on 18 April 2024 and then by home video and streaming release by Netflix on 13 May 2024.

== Reception ==
During its premiere at Venice, the film received standing ovation of over ten minutes.

On the review aggregator website Rotten Tomatoes, 50% of 8 critics' reviews are positive, with an average rating of 6.3/10. Metacritic, which uses a weighted average, assigned the film a score of 64 out of 100, based on 4 critics, indicating "generally favorable" reviews.

Damon Wise from Deadline positively compared the film to Elio Petri's Investigation of a Citizen Above Suspicion.

Camillo De Marco from Cineuropa described the film as "a finely crafted and well-directed genre film enhanced by the performances of Pierfrancesco Favino and Toni Servillo".

Variety called the film "a solidly assembled yarn about the on-the-ground consequences of a moral breakdown at the heart of the state". Time Out gave the film a rating of four stars out of five.

== Accolades ==
Awards and nominations for Adagio
Award or film festival	Date of ceremony	Category	Recipient(s)	Result	Ref.
David di Donatello Awards	May 3, 2024	Best Score	Subsonica	Won	
David di Donatello Awards	May 3, 2024	Best Original Song	"Adagio" (from Adagio – Music and lyrics by Samuel Umberto Romano, Massimiliano Casacci, Davide Dileo, Enrico Matta, and Luca Vicini; performed by Subsonica)	Nominated	
David di Donatello Awards	May 3, 2024	Best Supporting Actor	Adriano Giannini	Nominated	
David di Donatello Awards	May 3, 2024	Best Visual Effects	Stefano Leoni and Flaminia Maltese	Nominated	
David di Donatello Awards	May 3, 2024	Best Make-up	Antonello Resch, Lorenzo Tamburini, Michele Salgaro Vaccaro and Francesca Galafassi	Nominated	
Venice Film Festival	9 September 2023	Golden Lion	Stefano Sollima	Nominated	
Venice Film Festival	9 September 2023	Best New Young Actor	Gianmarco Franchini	Won	
Venice Film Festival	9 September 2023	Best Soundtrack	Subsonica	Won	
