= The Great Ambition =

2024 Italian film by Andrea Segre

- Italian theatrical release poster
- Italian: Berlinguer. La grande ambizione
- Directed by: Andrea Segre
- Written by: Andrea Segre; Marco Pettenello
- Produced by: Marta Donzelli; Gregorio Paonessa; Francesco Bonsembiante
- Starring: Elio Germano; Paolo Pierobon; Roberto Citran; Elena Radonicich; Fabrizia Sacchi; Paolo Calabresi; Andrea Pennacchi; Giorgio Tirabassi; Stefano Abbati; Francesco Acquaroli
- Cinematography: Benoit Dervaux
- Edited by: Jacopo Quadri
- Music by: Iosonouncane
- Production companies: Vivo Film; Jolefilm; Tarantula; Agitprop; Rai Cinema
- Distributed by: Lucky Red
- Release dates: 16 October 2024 (Rome); 31 October 2024 (Italy)
- Countries: Italy; Belgium; Bulgaria
- Language: Italian

The Great Ambition (Italian: Berlinguer. La grande ambizione) is a 2024 Italian biographical drama film directed by Andrea Segre. It stars Elio Germano as politician Enrico Berlinguer, who led the Italian Communist Party from 1972 to 1984. It opened the 19th Rome Film Festival on 16 October 2024 and received a theatrical release in Italy on 31 October 2024.

== Plot ==
Defying the dogmas of the Cold War and a world divided in two, Enrico Berlinguer and the PCI tried for five years to gain power, opening a period of dialogue with the Christian Democracy and coming close to changing history with the Historic Compromise. From 1973, when he escaped an attack in Sofia by the Bulgarian secret service, through electoral campaigns and trips to Moscow, the front pages of newspapers around the world and risky relationships with those in power, up to the assassination in 1978 of the president of the Christian Democracy Aldo Moro. The story of a man and a people for whom life and politics, private and collective, were inextricably linked.

== Cast ==
- Elio Germano as Enrico Berlinguer
- Paolo Pierobon as Giulio Andreotti
- Roberto Citran as Aldo Moro
- Elena Radonicich as Letizia Laurenti
- Fabrizia Sacchi as Nilde Iotti
- Paolo Calabresi as Ugo Pecchioli
- Andrea Pennacchi as Luciano Barca
- Giorgio Tirabassi as Alberto Menichelli
- Stefano Abbati as Umberto Terracini
- Francesco Acquaroli as Pietro Ingrao
- Pierluigi Corallo as Antonio Tatò
- Nikolay Danchev as Leonid Brezhnev
- Svetoslav Dobrev as Todor Zhivkov
- Luca Lazzareschi as Alessandro Natta
- Lucio Patanè as Gianni Cervetti
- Alice Airoldi as Bianca Berlinguer

== Production ==
Principal photography began in November 2023. The film was shot in Rome, Sofia, as well as Sassari and Porto Torres in Sardinia.

== Release ==
A promotional still from the film was released on 18 July 2024. The film opened the 19th Rome Film Festival on 16 October 2024, and received a theatrical release in Italy on 31 October 2024.

Fandango acquired the international distribution rights to the film on 5 September 2024. In March 2025, the film was acquired by Nour Films in France; Filmin in Spain; Risi in Portugal; Cineworx in Switzerland; Imovision in Brazil; Weird Wave in Greece; Palace in Australia and New Zealand; and McF Megacom in Serbia, Croatia, Bosnia and Herzegovia, Montenegro, Slovenia, and North Macedonia.

== Awards and nominations ==
Award	Year	Category	Recipient(s)	Result	Ref.
David di Donatello	2025	Best Film	The Great Ambition	Nominated	
David di Donatello	2025	Best Director	Andrea Segre	Nominated	
David di Donatello	2025	Best Original Screenplay	Andrea Segre, Marco Pettenello	Nominated	
David di Donatello	2025	Best Producer	Marta Donzelli, Gregorio Paonessa, Francesco Bonsembiante	Nominated	
David di Donatello	2025	Best Actor	Elio Germano	Won	
David di Donatello	2025	Best Supporting Actor	Roberto Citran	Nominated	
David di Donatello	2025	Best Casting	Stefania de Santis	Nominated	
David di Donatello	2025	Best Score	Iosonouncane	Nominated	
David di Donatello	2025	Best Art Direction	Alessandro Vannucci and Laura Casalini	Nominated	
David di Donatello	2025	Best Make-up	Sara Morlando, Rossella Sicignano, Leonardo Cruciano, Viola Moneta	Nominated	
David di Donatello	2025	Best Hairstyling	Desiree Corridoni	Nominated	
David di Donatello	2025	Best Editing	Jacopo Quadri	Won	
David di Donatello	2025	Best Sound	Alessandro Palmerini, Marc Bastien, Vincent Grégorio, Franco Piscopo	Nominated	
David di Donatello	2025	Best Visual Effects	Tristan Lilien, Michel Denis	Nominated	
David di Donatello	2025	Young David	The Great Ambition	Nominated	
Nastri d'Argento	2025	Best Film	The Great Ambition	Nominated	
Nastri d'Argento	2025	Best Actor	Elio Germano	Nominated	
Nastri d'Argento	2025	Best Supporting Actor	Paolo Pierobon	Nominated	
Nastri d'Argento	2025	Best Casting Director	Stefania De Santis	Nominated	
Nastri d'Argento	2025	Best Editing	Jacopo Quadri	Nominated	
Nastri d'Argento	2025	SIAE Nastro for Best Screenplay	Andrea Segre, Marco Pettenello	Won	
Rome Film Festival	2024	Progressive Cinema Competition	The Great Ambition	Nominated	
Rome Film Festival	2024	Best Actor	Elio Germano	Won	
