= Iosonouncane =

- Born: Jacopo Incani; 1983 (age 41–42); Iglesias, Sardinia, Italy
- Origin: Buggerru, Sardinia, Italy
- Occupations: Singer-songwriter; composer; producer
- Years active: 2000–present

Jacopo Incani (born 1983), known professionally as Iosonouncane (lit. 'I-am-a-dog'), is an Italian singer-songwriter, composer, and music producer.

== Career ==
Originally from Buggerru, Incani lived in Iglesias before moving to Bologna to attend university. In 2000, he founded the band Adharma, releasing an EP and an album. In 2008, he launched the project "Iosonouncane". He made his debut in 2010 with the album La macarena su Roma, which was praised for its blend of singer-songwriter style, samples, and provocative lyrics, earning a nomination for the Targa Tenco as Best Debut Album. He subsequently released the albums Die in 2015 and Ira in 2021. The former was ranked eleventh among the best Italian albums of the decade according to Rolling Stone. Additionally, he has composed various soundtracks, including for Gli ultimi giorni dell'umanità (2022) and The Great Ambition (2024), the latter of which earned him a David di Donatello nomination for Best Composer.

== Discography ==
=== Studio albums ===
List of solo studio albums, with chart positions and certifications
Title	Details	Peak chart positions	Certifications
Title	Details	ITA	Certifications
La macarena su Roma	Released: 22 October 2010; Label: Trovarobato	―	
Die	Released: 30 March 2015; Label: Trovarobato	―	
Ira	Released: 14 May 2021; Label: RCA, Trovarobato	6	

=== Live albums ===
Title	Album details	Peak chart positions
Title	Album details	ITA
Jalitah (with Paolo Angeli)	Release date: 9 June 2023; Label: Panico	―
Qui noi cadiamo verso il fondo gelido	Release date: 24 November 2023; Label: RCA, Panico	―

=== Extended plays ===
Title	EP details
Split (with Verdena)	Release date: 2 September 2016; Label: Universal
