= Padrenostro =

2020 film

- Italian teaser poster
- Directed by: Claudio Noce
- Screenplay by: Claudio Noce; Enrico Audennio
- Story by: Claudio Noce; Enrico Audennio
- Produced by: Andrea Calbucci; Pierfrancesco Favino; Maurizio Piazza
- Starring: Pierfrancesco Favino; Barbara Ronchi; Mattia Garaci; Francesco Gheghi
- Cinematography: Michele D'Attanasio
- Edited by: Giogiò Franchini
- Music by: Ratchev & Carratello
- Production companies: Lungta Film; PKO Cinema & Co.; Tendercapital Productions; Vision Distribution
- Distributed by: Vision Distribution
- Release dates: 4 September 2020 (Venice); 24 September 2020 (Italy)
- Running time: 120 minutes
- Country: Italy
- Language: Italian
- Box office: $1.2 million

Padrenostro (Italian pronunciation: [ˌpadreˈnɔstro]; lit. 'Our Father') is a 2020 Italian coming-of-age drama film co-written and directed by Claudio Noce. It was selected to be shown in the main competition section of the 77th Venice International Film Festival. At Venice, Pierfrancesco Favino won the Volpi Cup for Best Actor.

The film is loosely based on the 1976 assassination attempt of deputy police commissioner Alfonso Noce, Noce's father, by far-left terrorist group Nuclei Armati Proletari, during the Years of Lead.

== Plot ==
Rome, 1976. 10-years-old Valerio witnesses together with his mother a failed assassination attempt on his father Alfonso by a terrorist commando. From that moment on, fear and a constant sense of vulnerability dramatically mark the feelings of the whole family. That summer, Valerio meets Christian, a boy slightly older than him. Lonely, rebellious, and bold, he seems to have come out of nowhere. Their meeting will change his life forever.

== Cast ==
- Pierfrancesco Favino as Alfonso Le Rose, Valerio's father
- Barbara Ronchi as Gina Le Rose, Valerio's mother
- Mattia Garaci as Valerio Le Rose
  - Paki Meduri as adult Valerio
- Francesco Gheghi as Christian
  - Giordano De Plano as adult Christian
- Anna Maria De Luca as Maria Le Rose, Valerio's grandmother
- Mario Pupella as Giuseppe Le Rose, Valerio's grandfather
- Lea Favino as Alice Le Rose, Valerio's little sister
- Eleonora De Luca as Ketty
- Antonio Gerardi as Francesco, a co-worker of Alfonso
- Francesco Colella as Rorò Le Rose, Valerio's uncle

== Production ==
Principal photography began on 29 July 2019 in Rome, moving from early October in Calabria.

== Release ==
The film had its world premiere at the 77th Venice International Film Festival on 4 September 2020. It was released in Italian theaters on 24 September 2020 by Vision Distribution.

== Reception ==
=== Box office ===
Padrenostro grossed $1.2 million in Italy.

=== Critical response ===
The film holds a 57% approval rating on review aggregator Rotten Tomatoes, based on seven reviews, with an average of 6/10. On Metacritic, it holds a rating of 51 out of 100, based on 11 critics, indicating "mixed or average reviews".
