= Francesco Gheghi =

Italian actor (born 2002)

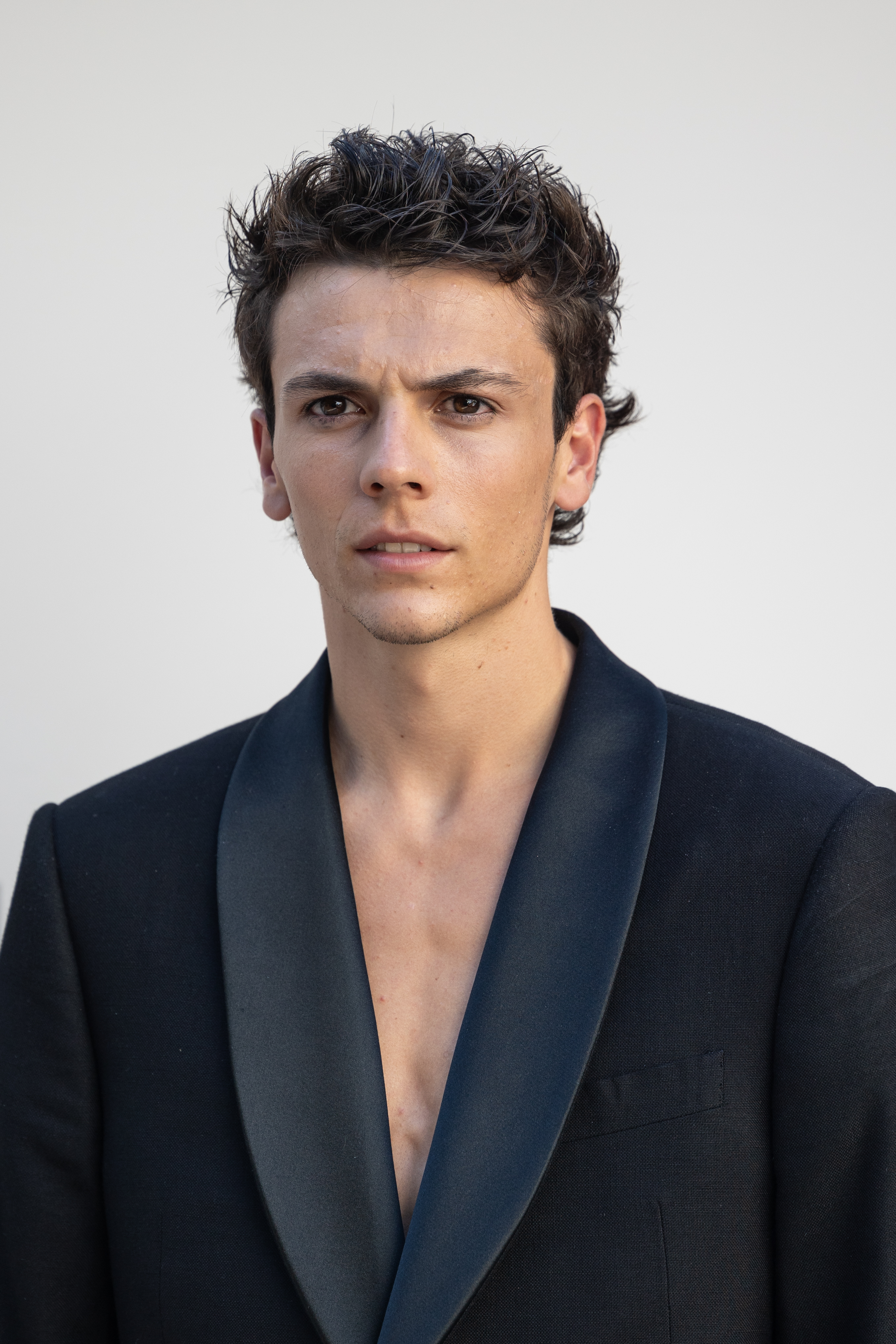
- Gheghi at the 2024 Venice International Film Festival
- Born: 19 August 2002 (age 24); Marino, Lazio, Italy
- Occupation: Actor
- Years active: 2018–present

Francesco Gheghi (Italian pronunciation: [franˈtʃesko ˈɡɛ.ɡi]; born 19 August 2002) is an Italian actor. For his role as Luigi Celeste in the film Familia (2024), he won the Orizzonti Award for Best Actor at the 81st Venice International Film Festival.

== Early life ==
Gheghi was born in Marino, Lazio. His parents own a pizzeria. He has an older sister. From 2015 to 2020, he attended the Jenny Tamburi drama school in Rome. He graduated from a liceo delle scienze umane in 2021.

== Career ==
Gheghi began acting in theater productions at the age of eight. At the age of 14, he made his professional acting debut in the 2018 film Io sono Tempesta by Daniele Luchetti. In 2024, he starred as Luigi Celeste in the film Familia, a role that won him the Orizzonti Award for Best Actor at the 81st Venice International Film Festival.

== Personal life ==
Gheghi is a fan of AS Roma.

== Acting credits ==
=== Film ===
Year	Title	Role	Ref.
2018	Io sono Tempesta	Nicola	
2019	My Brother Chases Dinosaurs	Giacomo "Jack" Mazzariol	
2020	Padrenostro	Christian	
2022	The Invisible Thread	Leone Ferrari	
2022	Come le tartarughe	Luca	
2022	Flowing	Enrico Morel	
2023	Roma Blues	Al	
2024	Mascarpone: The Rainbow Cake	Ricky	
2024	Familia	Luigi "Gigi" Celeste	
2024	Bare Hands	Davide	
2025	Fuori	Giancarlo	
2025	Squali	Jonah	
2025	40 secondi	Maurizio	
2026	God Laughs	Friar Giacinto	
TBA	Un'altra madre	Lorenzo	

=== Television ===
Year	Title	Role	Notes	Ref.
2022	A muso duro - Campioni di vita	Michele	Television film	
TBA	SuburraMaxima	TBA		

=== Theater ===
Year	Title	Role	Theater	Ref.
2023	Romeo and Juliet	Romeo	Piccolo Teatro, Milan	

== Awards and nominations ==
Award	Year	Category	Work	Result	Ref.
David di Donatello	2025	Best Actor	Familia	Nominated	
Nastri d'Argento	2025	Premio Guglielmo Biraghi	Familia	Won	
Venice International Film Festival	2024	Orizzonti Award for Best Actor	Familia	Won	
