= Nostalgia (2022 film) =

2022 film by Mario Martone

- Theatrical release poster
- Directed by: Mario Martone
- Screenplay by: Mario Martone; Ippolita Di Majo
- Based on: Nostalgia by Ermanno Rea
- Produced by: Luciano Stella; Roberto Sessa; Maria Carolina Terzi; Carlo Stella
- Starring: Pierfrancesco Favino; Francesco Di Leva; Tommaso Ragno
- Cinematography: Paolo Carnera
- Edited by: Jacopo Quadri
- Production companies: Picomedia; Mad Entertainment; Medusa Film; Rosebud Entertainment Pictures
- Distributed by: Medusa Distribuzione (Italy); ARP Sélection (France)
- Release dates: 24 May 2022 (Cannes); 25 May 2022 (Italy); 4 January 2023 (France)
- Running time: 117 minutes
- Countries: Italy; France
- Language: Italian
- Box office: $3 million

Nostalgia is a 2022 drama film co-written and directed by Mario Martone, based on the 2016 novel by Ermanno Rea.

The film premiered in the official competition for Palme d'Or at the 75th Cannes Film Festival on 24 May 2022. The following month, the film won four Nastro d'Argento Awards, for Best Director, Best Actor, Best Supporting Actor, and Best Screenplay. It was selected as the Italian entry for the Best International Feature Film at the 95th Academy Awards, but it was not nominated.

== Plot ==
Felice returns to his hometown of Naples to visit his ill mother after spending 40 years living in Egypt, where he also converted to Islam, and married an Egyptian woman. Most of the film is set in the impoverished Rione Sanità area of Naples, where Felice first visits his mother and later meets local priest Don Luigi. Felice eventually tells Luigi in a sort of confession that in one of the petty thefts carried out by him and his childhood friend Oreste, the latter killed the owner of a local carpentry shop. Don Luigi throws him out of the church, telling him that Oreste had in the meantime risen to become a dangerous boss of the Camorra, the local organized crime syndicate.

A friend of Felice's mother warns him of danger and urges him to escape from Naples. Don Luigi then introduces Felice to a Camorra family, and during dinner he drinks wine for the very first time, becomes uninhibited, and talks about his childhood spent with Oreste, making everyone speechless. At this point Felice goes to visit the aged Oreste. Oreste, angry because of his friend's abandonment four decades earlier, follows him into an alley, kills him and steals his wallet – and finds inside an old photo of the two of them on a motorbike.

== Cast ==
- Pierfrancesco Favino as Felice Lasco
  - Emanuele Palumbo as young Felice
- Francesco Di Leva as Father Luigi Rega
- Tommaso Ragno as Oreste Spasiano
  - Artem Tkachuk as young Oreste
- Aurora Quattrocchi as Teresa Lasco
  - Daniela Ioia as young Teresa
- Sofia Essaïdi as Arlette
- Nello Mascia as Raffaele
- Salvatore Striano as Gegé
- Virginia Apicella as Adele

== Release ==
Nostalgia had its world premiere in the official competition for Palme d'Or at the 75th Cannes Film Festival on 24 May 2022. The film was released in Italy on 25 May 2022 and in France on 4 January 2023. It was released theatrically in the United States on 20 January 2023 by Breaking Glass Pictures.

== Reception ==
=== Box office ===
Nostalgia grossed $3 million worldwide, including $1.5 million in Italy and $1.2 million in France.

=== Critical response ===
On the review aggregator website Rotten Tomatoes, the film holds an approval rating of 89% based on 27 reviews, with an average rating of 7.2/10. The website's critics consensus reads, "Walking the tightrope between gangster drama and character study, Nostalgia takes us through the criminal underbelly of Naples in search of a past that may be better left behind." On Metacritic, which assigns a weighted average score out of 100 to reviews from mainstream critics, the film received an average score of 75, based on 11 reviews, indicating "generally favorable" reviews.

Lovia Gyarkye of The Hollywood Reporter praised acting performances by Favino and Ragno, Martone's direction and Paolo Carnera's camerawork, calling it a "surprisingly absorbing film" but adding that its exploration of nostalgia "gets telegraphed to the point of exhaustion." Peter Bradshaw's review in The Guardian described the film as "tremendously shot and terrifically acted," adding that the film "challenges the idea of nostalgia as broadcast in the title: it isn't simply that nostalgia is delusional, or that the past wasn't as great as it appears when viewed through rose-tinted spectacles. It is that there is no past and present."

=== Accolades ===
Nostalgia was released in Italy just in time to qualify for the annual 2022 Nastro d'Argento (Silver Ribbon) Awards handed out by the Italian national association of film critics SNGCI, in a ceremony held on 20 June 2022 at the MAXXI museum in Rome, where it received seven nominations and four wins.

These included Best Actor award for Favino—his fifth Silver Ribbon in that category, making him one of the most acclaimed Italian actors in history–and Best Director for Martone, who received the accolade for his work on both Nostalgia and his earlier film The King of Laughter (Qui rido io) released in September 2021.

The film was also screened at the Motovun Film Festival in July 2022, where it competed for the main award, the Propeller of Motovun.

Award	Date of ceremony	Category	Recipient(s)	Result	Ref(s)
Cannes Film Festival	28 May 2022	Palme d'Or	Mario Martone	Nominated	
Silver Ribbon Awards	20 June 2022	Best Film		Nominated	
Silver Ribbon Awards	20 June 2022	Best Director	Mario Martone	Won	
Silver Ribbon Awards	20 June 2022	Best Actor	Pierfrancesco Favino	Won	
Silver Ribbon Awards	20 June 2022	Best Screenplay	Mario Martone and Ippolita di Majo	Won	
Silver Ribbon Awards	20 June 2022	Best Supporting Actor	Francesco Di Leva and Tommaso Ragno	Won	
Silver Ribbon Awards	20 June 2022	Best Supporting Actress	Aurora Quattrocchi	Nominated	
Silver Ribbon Awards	20 June 2022	Best Sound		Nominated	
Motovun Film Festival	2 August 2022	Best Film	Mario Martone	Nominated	

== See also ==
- List of submissions to the 95th Academy Awards for Best International Feature Film
- List of Italian submissions for the Academy Award for Best International Feature Film
