= Hammamet (film) =

2020 film

- Directed by: Gianni Amelio
- Screenplay by: Gianni Amelio; Alberto Taraglio
- Produced by: Agostino Saccà; Maria Grazia Saccà
- Starring: Pierfrancesco Favino; Renato Carpentieri; Claudia Gerini; Omero Antonutti; Giuseppe Cederna
- Cinematography: Luan Amelio Ujkaj
- Edited by: Simona Paggi
- Music by: Nicola Piovani
- Production companies: Pepito Produzioni; Rai Cinema; Minerva Pictures; Evolution People; SBH
- Distributed by: 01 Distribution
- Release date: January 9, 2020
- Running time: 126 minutes
- Country: Italy
- Language: Italian

Hammamet is a 2020 Italian biographical drama co-written and directed by Gianni Amelio, based on the last years of life of Bettino Craxi (1934–2000), a controversial Italian politician who was the Secretary of the Italian Socialist Party, served as Prime Minister during the 1980s and later fled to Tunisia to avoid legal prosecution on corruption charges during the Mani Pulite scandal. Craxi is portrayed by Pierfrancesco Favino.

The film was released shortly before the 20th anniversary of Craxi's death, which occurred on 19 January 2000 in the Tunisian town of Hammamet, where he had lived since 1994 to avoid serving a 27-years in jail sentence because of his corruption crimes.

== Plot ==
In 1989, during the 45th Congress of the Italian Socialist Party held at the Ansaldo plant in Milan, the party treasurer, Vincenzo Sartori, attempts to express his concerns regarding his conduct to the "President"—a figure clearly identifiable as the party secretary, Bettino Craxi. According to Sartori, Craxi has betrayed the ideals of socialism in favor of illicit activities, and, as a result of his actions, the party has come under investigation. Sartori, aware that he is being spied upon despite his own integrity, wishes to leave politics and tenders his resignation to the President; however, Craxi downplays the risks and defends his actions, preventing Sartori from leaving the party. Four years later, the PSI is engulfed by the *Tangentopoli* scandal; Craxi falls from grace, and Sartori commits suicide by throwing himself from the balcony of his office.

Seven years later—and having lived in self-imposed exile for roughly five years to evade Italian justice—Craxi, now gravely ill with diabetes mellitus, resides in a villa in the city of Hammamet, Tunisia, receiving periodic visits from his wife and his daughter, Anita. One night, a man dressed in guerrilla gear manages to elude the military guards monitoring the politician's residence; once captured, the President recognizes him as Fausto Sartori, Vincenzo's only son. The young man, who suffers from psychological issues, has come to deliver a letter to Craxi in which his late father indignantly reproaches him for all his illicit deeds. Craxi dismisses these grievances and takes the young man under his wing. However, Fausto secretly acquires a pistol with the intention of killing Craxi. Fausto's presence causes considerable unease for Anita, who views the young man with suspicion—particularly after Craxi decides to have his daughter stop typing his memoirs, opting instead to narrate them aloud while being filmed by Fausto. By following and filming the President in his daily life, Fausto discovers his many struggles: his illness, his disdain for the new political landscape that has taken hold in Italy, his troubled relationship with his son, and the stigma he endures in the wake of the *Mani Pulite* (Clean Hands) scandal. Eventually, Craxi reveals to Fausto that he has known all along that the young man is concealing a gun in his backpack—a weapon he intends to use against him—and proposes a deal: if Fausto spares his life, Craxi agrees to be filmed while divulging certain secrets regarding his past actions—secrets never before revealed—that could potentially destabilize the entire Italian political order. The young man consents, captures the footage, and then vanishes.

As Craxi’s health deteriorates, an attractive former mistress of the politician arrives in Hammamet; still in love with him, she asks Anita for permission to see him one last time. Initially, Anita refuses, but later—observing that her father, too, remains fond of the woman—she arranges for the two to meet at a hotel. Subsequently, Craxi receives a visit from a friend—an Italian politician belonging to a rival party—and the two reflect on the fact that, despite being political adversaries, they have always maintained an excellent personal rapport and treated one another with respect—a standard of conduct that, in the new era of Italian politics, seems to have become all but impossible.

Later, Craxi is diagnosed with a kidney tumor—a condition that proves exceedingly difficult to treat in Hammamet due to the local hospital’s obsolete and substandard medical equipment. To avoid unnecessary risks, the President would need to undergo surgery at an Italian hospital; however, were he to return to Italy, he would face the immediate threat of arrest. Anita manages to organize a private operation to repatriate her father, seemingly succeeding in convincing him that no harm will come to him; however, shortly before their departure, Craxi locks himself inside the car that had brought him to the airport, refusing to return to Milan.

Craxi subsequently undergoes surgery in Tunisia, and the procedure initially appears to be successful: the former Prime Minister returns home and, despite being frail and confined to a wheelchair, seems to be making a good recovery. A few days later, however, the former Socialist leader suffers a cardiac arrest; just before dying, he experiences two visions. In the first, he relives his childhood in boarding school; in the second, he encounters his father, who leads him from the rooftop of the Milan Cathedral to a theater where a crude satirical performance is taking place—a show in which Craxi’s own corpse is mercilessly mocked. The following morning, Anita finds her father dead in the garden of their home.

Several months later, Anita is summoned to a psychiatric hospital in Milan, as a patient has requested to see her. It turns out to be Fausto, who has by now completely lost his mind—to the point of conflating the image of Craxi with that of his own father. Fausto reveals that, in reality, his father Vincenzo did not commit suicide; rather, it was Fausto himself who killed him by pushing him from the balcony - an action to which he was driven by the intense indignation he felt over the fact that his father supported Craxi, whom he considered a criminal. Before taking his final leave, the young man hands Anita the tape containing the President's secret confessions, asking her to protect it at the cost of her own life. Anita takes the object into her custody and departs; when the institute's director asks her if she knew the man, she replies that she has never seen him before.

== Cast ==
- Pierfrancesco Favino as the President
- Livia Rossi as the daughter Anita
- Alberto Paradossi as the son
- Luca Filippi as Fausto Sartori
- Silvia Cohen as the wife
- Renato Carpentieri as the politician
- Claudia Gerini as the lover
- Federico Bergamaschi as the nephew Francesco
- Omero Antonutti as the father
- Giuseppe Cederna as Vincenzo Sartori

== Production ==
Filming began on 18 March 2019 and took place in Pavia, Italy and Hammamet, Tunisia.

== Release ==
The first promotional images were released on 13 March 2019, while the first theatrical trailer was released on 18 December 2019.
