= Cristiano Travaglioli =

Italian film editor (born 1968)

- Born: 9 September 1968 (age 57); Recanati, Italy
- Education: University of Bologna
- Occupation: Film editor
- Years active: 1998-present

Cristiano Travaglioli (born 9 September 1968) is an Italian film editor, best known for his long professional association with Paolo Sorrentino.

== Life and career ==
Born in Recanati, Travaglioli grew up in Reggio Emilia, where he got a degree as an electrical engineer. After studying at the Dams department of the University of Bologna, he moved to Rome, where he enrolled at the Centro Sperimentale di Cinematografia, studying film editing under Roberto Perpignani. In 1988, he made his professional debut as assistant editor in Ciprì & Maresco's The Uncle from Brooklyn.

Travaglioli is best known for his long professional association with director Paolo Sorrentino, which began in Sorrentino's film debut One Man Up; after three films in which he served as assistant of Giogiò Franchini, he edited every Sorrentino's film starting from Il divo. Among the directors with whom he has collaborated are also Pif, Francesco Munzi, Pappi Corsicato and Corrado Guzzanti.

During his career Travaglioli received numerous awards, including a European Film Award for Best Editor, a David di Donatello, a Nastro d'Argento and a Ciak D'Oro.

== Selected filmography ==
- Il divo (2008)
- This Must Be the Place (2011)
- Studio illegale (2013)
- The Great Beauty (2013)
- The Mafia Kills Only in Summer (2013)
- Black Souls (2014)
- Youth (2015)
- The Young Pope (TV-series, 2016)
- Sicilian Ghost Story (2017)
- Loro (2018)
- The New Pope (TV-series, 2020)
- The Hand of God (2021)
- Promises (2021)
- Security (2021)
- Parthenope (2024)
- Familia (2024)
- Vanished into the Night (2024)
- La grazia (2025)
- Duse (2025)
