= Francesco Di Leva =

Italian actor (born 1978)

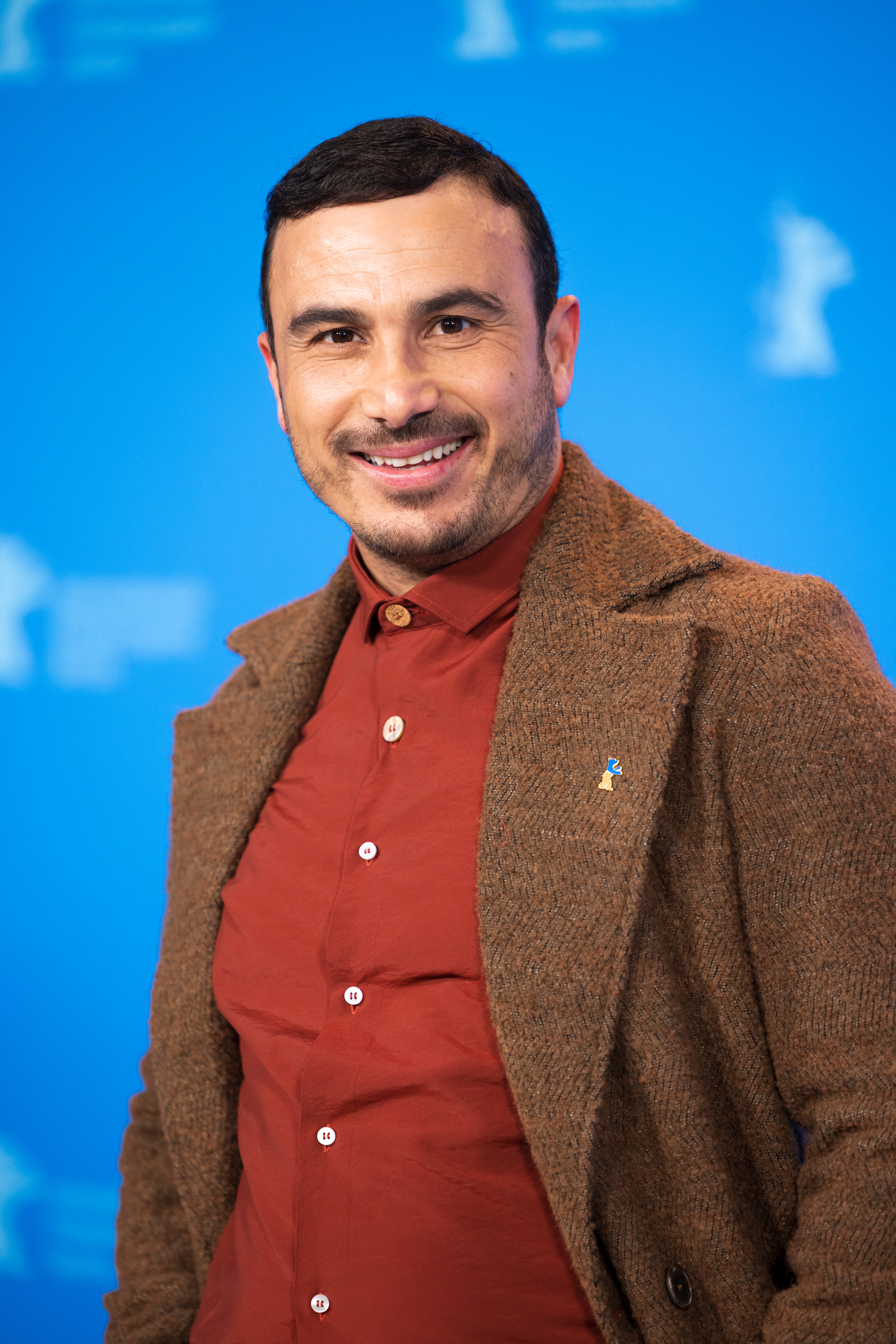
- Di Leva in 2023
- Born: 4 September 1978 (age 47); Naples, Italy
- Occupation: Actor

Francesco Di Leva (born 4 September 1978) is an Italian film, television, and stage actor.

== Life and career ==
Born in Naples, Di Leva started acting in local amateur dramatics at 14 years old. He is one of the co-founders of the "Nest Napoli Est Teatro" theatre in his hometown. He made his film debut in 1999, in Aurelio Grimaldi's The Man-Eater.

In 2011, Di Leva was nominated for the David di Donatello for best supporting actor thanks his performance in A Quiet Life. In 2020 he received a nomination for David di Donatello for best supporting actor for his performance in Mario Martone's The Mayor of Rione Sanità. Between 2022 and 2023, he won a David di Donatello for Best Supporting Actor and a Nastro d'Argento in the same category for his performance in Martone's Nostalgia. In 2025, he won a second David di Donatello for his performance in Francesco Costabile's Familia.

== Filmography ==
=== Films ===
Year	Title	Role(s)	Notes
1999	The Man Eater	Francesco	
2002	Rosa Funzeca	Salvatore	
2003	Pater Familias	Gerardo	
2004	Segui le ombre	Aldo De Rosa	
2004	Vento di terra	Tarantino	
2007	Una notte	Waiter	Cameo appearance
2009	Bets and Wedding Dresses	Francesco	
2010	We Believed	Security guard	Cameo appearance
2010	A Quiet Life	Edoardo	
2012	Waves	Andrea	
2014	Milionari	Babbà	
2015	Natale col Boss	Fefè	
2016	La stoffa dei sogni	Andrea	
2017	Caccia al tesoro	O'Mastino	
2018	Put Grandma in the Freezer	Gennaro	
2019	The Mayor of Rione Sanità	Antonio Barracano	
2020	Fino ad essere felici	Andrea Terranova	
2020	Il delitto Mattarella	Massimo	
2020	Il buco in testa	Fabio Violante	
2021	The King of Laughter	Photographer	Cameo appearance
2021	The Hidden Child	Biagio	
2021	Benvenuti in casa Esposito	Pietro De Luca	
2022	Nostalgia	Luigi Rega	
2022	La cura	Bernard	Also writer
2022	Burning Hearts	Giovannangelo	
2023	Mixed by Erry	Captain Fortunato Ricciardi	
2023	Last Night of Amore	Dino Ruggeri	
2023	Adagio	Bruno	
2024	Familia	Franco Celeste	
2024	The Children's Train	Capa 'E Fierro	
2025	40 secondi	Ludovico	

=== Television ===
Year	Title	Role(s)	Notes
1999	Un nuovo giorno	Gaetano Amato	Television movie
2003	Distretto di Polizia	Ultra	Episode: "I conti col passato"
2005	Distretto di Polizia	Fortunato	Episode: "Babygang"
2006	R.I.S. - Delitti imperfetti	Alessandro Sposini	Episode: "Fuoco incrociato"
2010	Il sorteggio	Gallo	Television movie
2010–2011	Squadra antimafia	Enzo	2 episodes
2013	Il clan dei camorristi	Ciccio Capuano	Main role
2022–present	Vincenzo Malinconico, avvocato d'insuccesso	Amodio Tricarico	Main role
2024	Wonderboys: The Secret Treasure of Naples	Chihuahua	Main role
2025	The Leopard	Russo	Main role
