= Federica Angeli =

Italian journalist

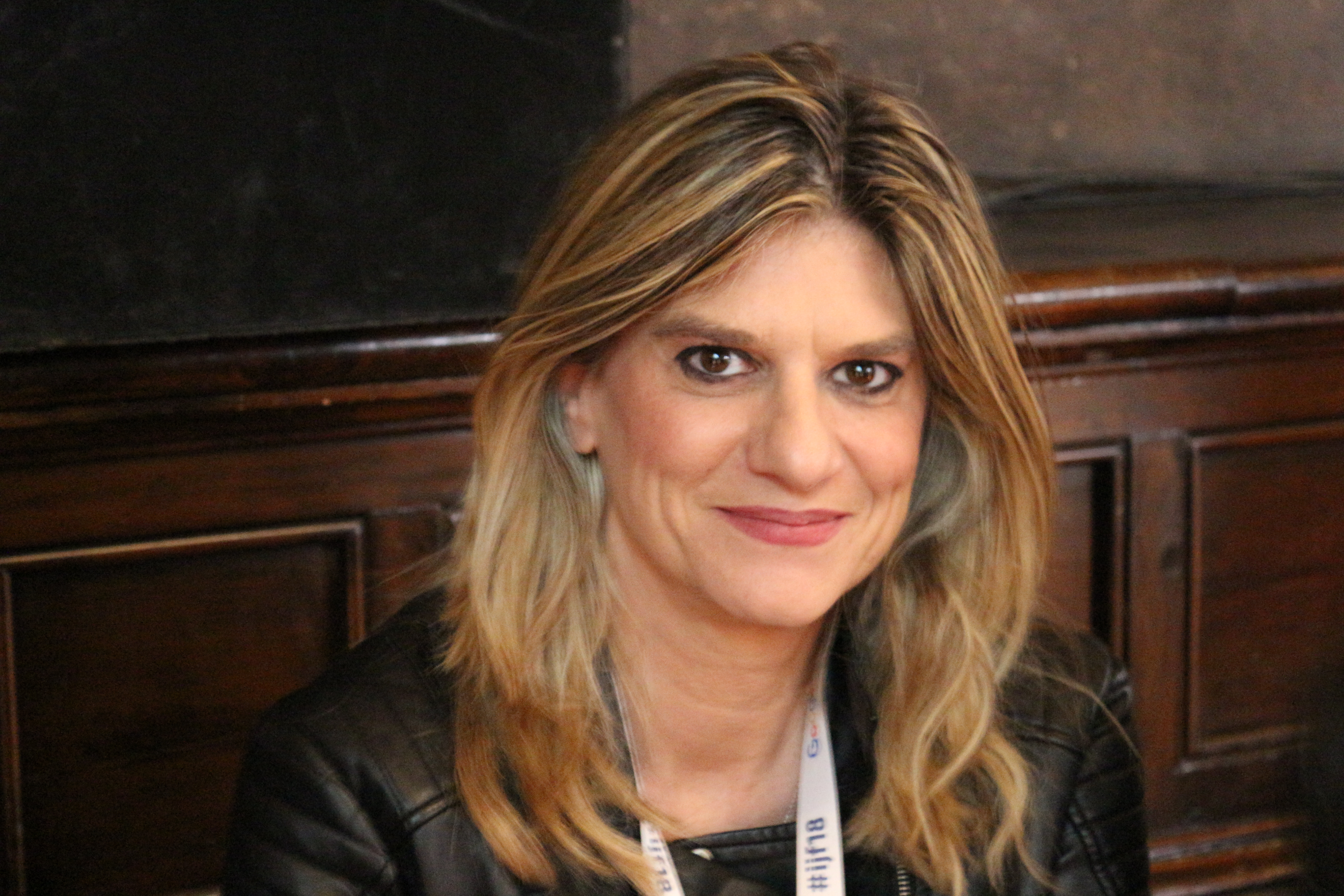
Federica Angeli

Federica Angeli (born 20 October 1975) is an Italian journalist known for her investigations into the gypsy Mafia of Rome.

== Biography ==
Born in Rome in 1975, she graduated at the University of Rome "La Sapienza" in 2003 in sociology with a thesis on the role of freelance in the great Italian newspapers [without source]. Since 1998, on the pages of the newspaper La Repubblica, deals with crime and crime.

In 2011 the Rome prosecutors opened an investigation following the investigation carried out by Federica Angeli together with Marco Mensurati who testifies, with video and audio recordings, beatings and acts of hazing (including "anesthesia") made by a group of heads of leather in the barracks of the Central Operating Safety Unit (NOCS) of Spinaceto. The investigation reveals that the group had previously been involved in the blitz for the liberation of the textile entrepreneur Giuseppe Soffiantini, following whom the special agent Samuele Donatoni had lost his life.

This is followed by the trial in court, the first instance sentence and the consequent statements by two soldiers on what presumably happened on the day of Stefano Cucchi's arrest.

As a result of his 2013 survey, carried out together with Carlo Bonini, on the link between the various organized crime groups in Ostia and the public administration, a judicial inquiry follows on the racket that ends with a maxi operation Police called New Dawn, after which 51 people are arrested belonging to the Fasciani, Triassi and Cuntrera-Caruana clans. The accusation is corruption, infiltration of administrative bodies and the allocation of housing, removal of commercial activities to the victims of usury and possible links to the murder of Giuseppe Valentino, which took place on 22 January 2005 in his bar in Porta Metronia in the San Giovanni district of Rome.

Following death threats, since 17 July 2013 Federica Angeli lives under permanent escort. On 21 December 2015 she was awarded the title of Officer of the Order of Merit of the Italian Republic by the President of Italy Sergio Mattarella for her commitment in the fight against the mafia.

On 25 January 2018, the Eclisse operation leads to the arrest of 32 people belonging to the Spada clan in Ostia, arrested on charges of mafia-type criminal association. On 19 February 2018, accompanied by the Director of La Repubblica Mario Calabresi and the Deputy Director Sergio Rizzo, he testified in the trial against Armando Spada.

On 7 April 2018 an envelope addressed to her, containing a bullet, was delivered to the Rome office of Fatto Fatto.
