= Naples to New York =

2024 film

- Directed by: Gabriele Salvatores
- Screenplay by: Gabriele Salvatores
- Produced by: Isabella Cocuzza; Vlaho Krile; Claudio Lullo; Arturo Paglia; Marco Patrizi; Francesco Ruggeri
- Starring: Pierfrancesco Favino; Dea Lanzaro; Antonio Guerra; Omar Benson Miller; Anna Ammirati; Anna Lucia Pierro; Tomas Arana; Antonio Catania
- Cinematography: Diego Indraccolo
- Edited by: Julien Panzarasa
- Music by: Federico De Robertis
- Production companies: Paco Cinematografica; Rai Cinema; Friuli Venezia Giulia Film Commission; Film Commission Regione Campania
- Distributed by: 01 Distribution
- Release date: 21 November 2024
- Running time: 124 minutes
- Country: Italy
- Budget: €18,750,000
- Box office: $10,737,628 (Italy)

Naples to New York (Italian: Napoli – New York) is a 2024 Italian period drama film, directed by Gabriele Salvatores and starring Pierfrancesco Favino, Dea Lanzaro and Antonio Guerra. It follows two Neapolitan children who secretly embark on a journey to New York City in an attempt to escape the poverty of post-war Italy.

The film is based on an unproduced screenplay written in the late 1940s by Federico Fellini and Tullio Pinelli, which Salvatores adapted for the screen more than seventy years later.

Upon release, the film received mixed to positive reviews from critics, who praised its visual style, cinematography, and emotional resonance, while criticizing its pacing and narrative structure. The film attracted attention both as a cinematic rediscovery of a "lost" Fellini work and as a contemporary interpretation of the migration experience.

== Plot ==
In 1949 Naples, ten-year-old Celestina Scognamiglio loses her home and her aunt Amelia in an accidental explosion. Left orphaned, Celestina's only surviving relative is her sister Agnese, who years earlier emigrated to New York City. Her companion is Carmine, a twelve-year-old street boy who survives by selling cigarettes and small cons in post-war Naples.

The pair encounter George, an African-American cook working on the U.S. Navy ship Victory, docked in the port. After a failed deal involving a jaguar cub, Carmine secretly follows George onto the ship, with Celestina clinging to his boat. They become clandestine stowaways bound for New York.

On board, they are discovered by the ship's purser, Domenico Garofalo (Pierfrancesco Favino), who persuades the captain to let them remain until arrival. During the voyage, Celestina and Carmine assist George in the galley and occasionally trick passengers with card games. George is later arrested on suspicion of wrongdoing but eventually exonerated thanks to Carmine's testimony.

Upon arrival, Domenico prevents the children's deportation by threatening to expose the captain's alcoholism. George helps them disembark hidden inside a crate of oranges. In New York, Celestina learns that Agnese has been arrested and charged with murder after killing her abusive, already-married husband. Despairing, she attempts suicide but is saved by local children and hospitalized. Carmine reunites with Domenico and his wife Anna, who consider adopting both children. Carmine hesitates, fearing that adoption would make Celestina his sister, preventing him from one day marrying her.

Domenico enlists journalist Joe Agrillo to publicize Agnese's plight. Italian-American communities and early feminist groups rally to her defense, reducing her sentence from death to two years in prison. The film concludes with Carmine and Celestina facing an uncertain but hopeful future, as Domenico offers them a home in their new land.

== Cast ==
- Dea Lanzaro as Celestina Scognamiglio
- Pierfrancesco Favino as Domenico Garofalo
- Antonio Guerra as Carmine
- Anna Ammirati as Anna Garofalo
- Omar Benson Miller as George
- Anna Lucia Pierro as Agnese Scognamiglio
- Tomas Arana as Il Capitano
- Antonio Catania as Joe Agrillo

== Production ==
=== Subject ===
The story treatment was rediscovered by Tullio Pinelli himself in a trunk full of papers. Director Gabriele Salvatores explained:

"Just the fact of coming into possession of a story written by Federico Fellini and Tullio Pinelli, about which little or nothing was known, already seemed wonderful to me [...] How could I not get involved? A story dating back to the late 1940s, inspired by a true story, told as a fairy tale. And written at a transitional moment for Italian cinema: between neorealism, Italian-style comedy, and the first attempts at a more fantastical cinema."

=== Filming ===
Naples to New York was filmed over 12 weeks beginning in June 2023. Shooting took place in Naples, Trieste, Rijeka (Croatia), and at the Cinecittà Studios in Rome. In Trieste, locations such as Palazzo Carciotti and Porto Vecchio were used to recreate mid-20th century New York.

== Reception ==
=== Critical response ===
Naples to New York received mixed to positive reviews from critics. Praise was directed towards its visual style, cinematography, and emotional resonance, while criticism focused on pacing and narrative structure. Jonathan Romney of Screen Daily described it as a "mild exercise in period picaresque" where "the three chapters never quite gel into a whole," particularly highlighting that the New York segment "takes some swallowing". Cineuropa noted the film's "visually striking" qualities while observing that Salvatores's style diverges from Fellini's surrealism, instead creating a more grounded narrative adaptation. Similarly, Gazettely praised the "emotionally resonant narrative" and lush production design, calling the film "a journey that is as visual as it is emotional".

=== Box office ===
In Italy, Naples to New York grossed approximately US$4,627,683 (around €4.2 million), while its total worldwide box office amounted to US$6,109,945., for a total of approximately $10,737,628.

== Awards and nominations ==
- 2025 – David di Donatello
  - Best Visual Effects – Víctor Pérez
  - David Youth Award
  - Nomination for Best Supporting Actor – Pierfrancesco Favino
  - Nomination for Best Adapted Screenplay – Gabriele Salvatores
- 2024 – Ciak d'oro
  - Nomination for Best Dramatic Film
  - Nomination for Best Director
  - Nomination for Best Actor – Pierfrancesco Favino
