= Pierfrancesco Favino =

Italian actor (born 1969)

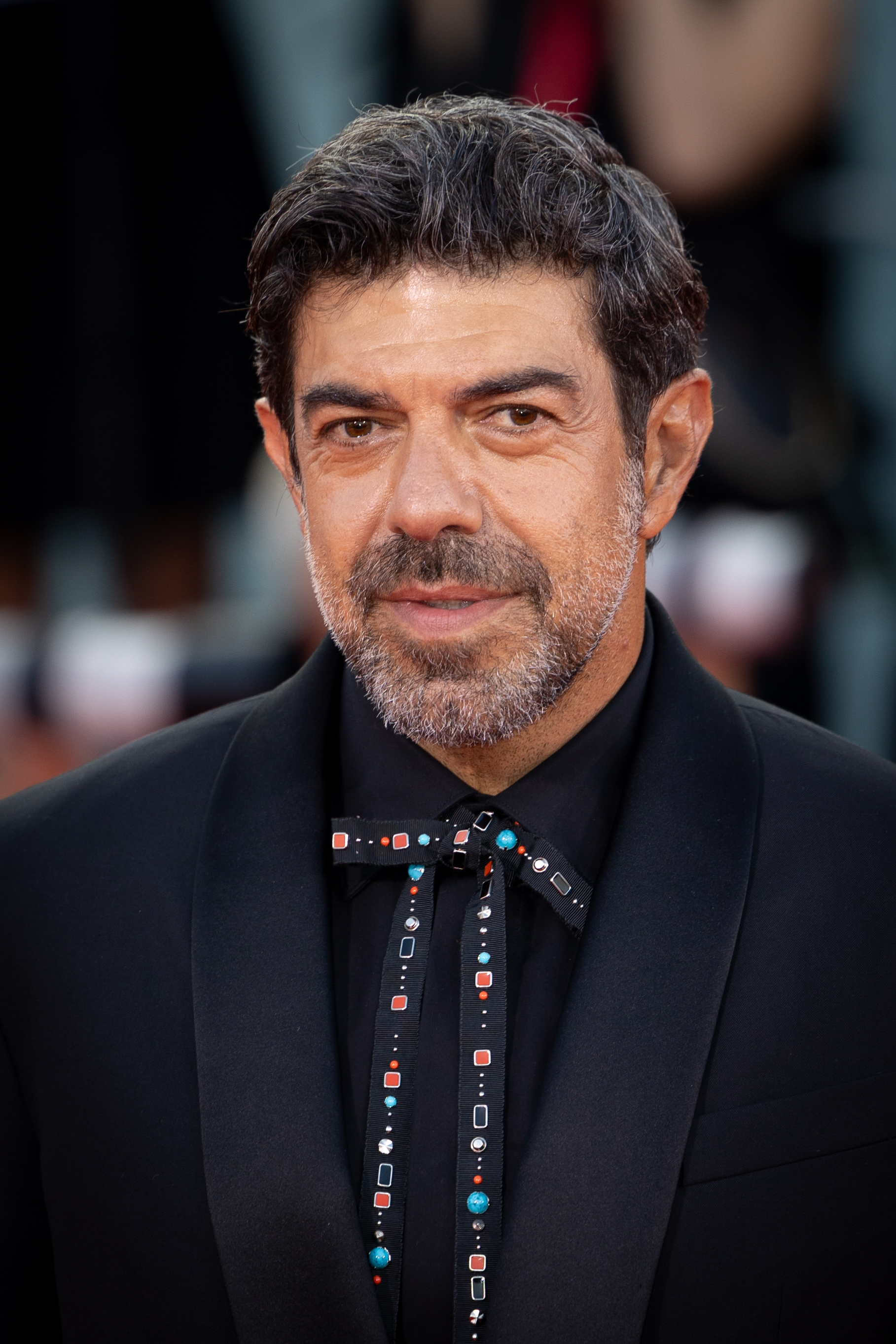
- Favino in 2024
- Born: 24 August 1969 (age 57); Rome, Italy
- Occupations: Actor; producer
- Years active: 1991–present
- Height: 1.80 m (5 ft 11 in)
- Partner: Anna Ferzetti
- Children: 2

Pierfrancesco Favino (Italian pronunciation: [ˌpjɛrfranˈtʃesko faˈviːno]; born 24 August 1969) is an Italian actor and film producer. He is the recipient of numerous accolades, including three David di Donatello, six Nastri d'argento, two Globi d'oro, three Ciak d'oro and a Volpi Cup.

Favino began his acting career on stage before transitioning to television and film in the 1990s. His breakthrough role came with the critically acclaimed film El Alamein: The Line of Fire, which earned him widespread praise in Italy. He further solidified his reputation with standout performances in films such as Romanzo Criminale (2005), The Unknown Woman (2006), the nationally acclaimed Suburra (2015), The Traitor (2019), where he portrayed mafia boss Tommaso Buscetta, Padrenostro (2020), which earned him the Volpi Cup for Best Actor at the 77th Venice International Film Festival, Comandante (2023) and Naples to New York (2024).

Favino's American credits includes Night at the Museum (2006), The Chronicles of Narnia: Prince Caspian (2008), Angels & Demons (2009), World War Z (2013) and Rush (2013).

== Life and career ==
Favino was born in Rome, Italy, to Apulian parents from Candela, a comune in the province of Foggia. He has appeared in more than 40 European films and television series since the early 1990s, including Paolo Poeti's Amico mio, Gabriele Muccino's The Last Kiss, Gianni Amelio's The Keys to the House, Giuseppe Tornatore's The Unknown Woman and Ferzan Özpetek's Saturn in Opposition. In 1999 he starred in the HBO film Excellent Cadavers, an adaptation of Alexander Stille's novel of the same name. In 2006 he received the David di Donatello award – the Italian equivalent of the Oscar – for his role in the crime film Romanzo Criminale, directed by Michele Placido.

In 2006 he portrayed Christopher Columbus in 20th Century Fox's Night at the Museum. In 2008 he played General Glozelle, the leader of Miraz's Telmarine troops in The Chronicles of Narnia: Prince Caspian. He has worked with American director Ron Howard twice: in the 2009 film Angels & Demons, the adaptation of the novel of the same name by Dan Brown, in which he played the role of Inspector Ernesto Olivetti, and in the 2013 film Rush, in which he played the role of Formula One racing car driver Clay Regazzoni.

Other significant roles include the partisan leader Peppi Grotta in Spike Lee's Miracle at St. Anna in 2008, the sadistic riot control force policeman Cobra in Stefano Sollima's ACAB – All Cops Are Bastards in 2012, the anarchist Giuseppe Pinelli in Marco Tullio Giordana's Piazza Fontana, and the W.H.O. doctor in Marc Forster's apocalyptic-horror World War Z (2013).

In February 2018, he co-hosted the 68th edition of the Sanremo Music Festival, alongside Claudio Baglioni and Michelle Hunziker.

He participated in the 2026 Winter Olympics opening ceremony, held in Milan's San Siro stadium.

== Personal life ==
Favino has been in a relationship with Italian actress Anna Ferzetti since 2003. The couple has two daughters together, one born in 2006 and the other born in 2012.

== Filmography ==
=== Film ===
| Title | Year | Role(s) | Director | Notes |
|---|---|---|---|---|
| Pugili | 1995 | Boxer | Lino Capolicchio | |
| The Prince of Homburg | 1997 | Sparren | Marco Bellocchio | |
| Physical Jerks | 1997 | Castrovillari | Stefano Reali | |
| Dolce far niente | 1998 | Gioacchino Rossini | Nae Caranfil | |
| La Carbonara | 2000 | The Sergeant | Luigi Magni | |
| The Last Kiss | 2001 | Marco | Gabriele Muccino | |
| La verità vi spiego sull'amore | 2001 | Michelangelo | Francesco Apolloni | |
| Da zero a dieci | 2002 | Biccio | Luciano Ligabue | |
| El Alamein: The Line of Fire | 2002 | Sergeant Rizzo | Enzo Monteleone | |
| I Am Emma | 2002 | Carlo | Francesco Falaschi | |
| Past Perfect | 2003 | Filippo | Maria Sole Tognazzi | |
| Instructing the Heart | 2003 | Riccardo Martinelli | Giovanni Morricone | |
| Our Italian Husband | 2004 | Vincenzo Scocozza | Ilaria Borrelli | |
| The Keys to the House | 2004 | Alberto | Gianni Amelio | |
| Sorry, You Can't Get Through! | 2005 | Pietro (Shy) | Paolo Genovese and Luca Miniero | |
| Amatemi | 2005 | Claudio | Renato De Maria | |
| Romanzo Criminale | 2005 | Cesare Rocchi "Il Libanese" | Michele Placido | |
| The Unknown Woman | 2006 | Donato Adacher | Giuseppe Tornatore | |
| Night at the Museum | 2006 | Statue of Christopher Columbus | Shawn Levy | |
| Saturn in Opposition | 2007 | Davide | Ferzan Özpetek | |
| The Chronicles of Narnia: Prince Caspian | 2008 | General Glozelle | Andrew Adamson | |
| Miracle at St. Anna | 2008 | Peppi Grotta | Spike Lee | |
| The Man Who Loves | 2008 | Roberto | Maria Sole Tognazzi | |
| Angels & Demons | 2009 | Inspector Ernesto Olivetti | Ron Howard | |
| Where the Wild Things Are | 2009 | Carol (voice) | Spike Jonze | Italian voice-over |
| Kiss Me Again | 2010 | Marco | Gabriele Muccino | |
| Come Undone | 2010 | Domenico | Silvio Soldini | |
| Unlikely Revolutionaries | 2010 | Pepe | Lucio Pellegrini | |
| The Entrepreneur | 2011 | Nicola Ranieri | Giuliano Montaldo | |
| The Perfect Life | 2011 | Mario | Lucio Pellegrini | |
| Happy Feet Two | 2011 | Lovelace (voice) | George Miller | Italian voice-over |
| ACAB – All Cops Are Bastards | 2012 | Cobra | Stefano Sollima | |
| A Flat for Three | 2012 | Fulvio Brignola | Carlo Verdone | |
| Piazza Fontana: The Italian Conspiracy | 2012 | Giuseppe Pinelli | Marco Tullio Giordana | |
| Garibaldi's Lovers | 2012 | Statue of Giuseppe Garibaldi (voice) | Silvio Soldini | |
| World War Z | 2013 | W.H.O. Dr. Javier | Marc Forster | |
| Lino Miccichè, mio padre – Una visione del mondo | 2013 | Himself | Francesco Miccichè | Documentary |
| Rush | 2013 | Clay Regazzoni | Ron Howard | |
| Without Pity | 2014 | Mimmo | Michele Alhaique | Also producer |
| Une mère | 2015 | Pierre | Christine Carrière | |
| Suburra | 2015 | Filippo Malgradi | Stefano Sollima | |
| The Confessions | 2016 | Italian Minister | Roberto Andò | |
| Moglie e marito | 2017 | Andrea Rossini | Simone Godano | |
| My Cousin Rachel | 2017 | Enrico Rainaldi | Roger Michell | |
| Chi m'ha visto | 2017 | Peppino Quaglia | Alessandro Pondi | |
| There's No Place Like Home | 2018 | Carlo | Gabriele Muccino | |
| The Catcher Was a Spy | 2018 | Martinuzzi | Ben Lewin | |
| The King's Musketeers | 2018 | D'Artagnan | Giovanni Veronesi | |
| The Traitor | 2019 | Tommaso Buscetta | Marco Bellocchio | |
| Hammamet | 2020 | Bettino Craxi | Gianni Amelio | |
| The Best Years | 2020 | Giulio Ristuccia | Gabriele Muccino | |
| Padrenostro | 2020 | Alfonso Le Rose | Claudio Noce | Also producer |
| The King's Musketeers: All for One, One for All! | 2020 | D'Artagnan | Giovanni Veronesi | |
| Promises | 2021 | Alexander | Amanda Sthers | |
| Corro da te | 2022 | Gianni | Riccardo Milani | |
| Nostalgia | 2022 | Felice Lasco | Mario Martone | |
| The Hummingbird | 2022 | Marco Carrera | Francesca Archibugi | |
| Last Night of Amore | 2023 | Franco Amore | Andrea Di Stefano | |
| Comandante | 2023 | Salvatore Todaro | Edoardo De Angelis | |
| Adagio | 2023 | Romeo "Cammello" Barretta | Stefano Sollima | |
| The Count of Monte Cristo | 2024 | Abbé Faria | Alexandre de La Patellière and Matthieu Delaporte | |
| Maria | 2024 | Ferruccio Mezzadri | Pablo Larraín | |
| Naples to New York | 2024 | Domenico Garofalo | Gabriele Salvatores | |
| Enzo | 2025 | Paolo | Robin Campillo | |
| My Tennis Maestro | 2025 | Raul Gatti | Andrea Di Stefano | |
| God Laughs | 2026 | Fra Leopoldo | Giovanni Veronesi | |

=== Television ===
| Title | Year | Role(s) | Network | Notes |
|---|---|---|---|---|
| A Private Affair | 1993 | Ivan | Rai 1 | Television movie |
| Amico mio | 1993–1998 | Beppe Vanni | Rai 2 | 14 episodes |
| Correre contro | 1996 | Giacomo | Rai 1 | Television movie |
| Bonanno: A Godfather's Story | 1999 | Felice Buccellato | Hallmark Channel | Television movie |
| Excellent Cadavers | 1999 | Mario Fabbri | HBO | Television movie |
| Padre Pio: Miracle Man | 2000 | Emanuele Brunatto | Canale 5 | Two-parts television movie |
| La Sindone – 24 ore, 14 ostaggi | 2001 | Pietro | Rai Premium | Television movie |
| Judas | 2001 | Simon the Zealot | Canale 5 | Television movie |
| Gli insoliti ignoti | 2003 | Inspector Pietro Cucciolla | Canale 5 | Television movie |
| Ferrari | 2003 | Beppe Sicci | Canale 5 | Two-parts television movie |
| Part-Time | 2003 | Nicola | Rai 1 | Television movie |
| Bartali: The Iron Man | 2006 | Gino Bartali | Rai 1 | Two-parts television movie |
| Liberi di giocare | 2007 | Stefano Mariani | Rai 1 | Two-parts television movie |
| Pane e libertà | 2009 | Giuseppe De Vittorio | Rai 1 | Two-parts television movie |
| Il generale Della Rovere | 2011 | Giovanni Bertone | Rai 1 | Television movie |
| Qualunque cosa succeda | 2014 | Giuseppe Ambrosoli | Rai 1 | Two-parts television movie |
| Marco Polo | 2014–2016 | Niccolò Polo | Netflix | 9 episodes |
| Sanremo Music Festival 2018 | 2018 | Himself / Co-host | Rai 1 | Annual music festival |
| Armani in prima serata | 2020 | Narrator | La7 | Special |
| Call My Agent - Italia | 2023 | Himself | Sky Italia | Episode: "Pierfrancesco e Anna" |
| Nemesis † | 2026 | TBA | Netflix | Lead role; upcoming series |

=== Music videos ===
| Title | Year | Artist(s) | Notes |
|---|---|---|---|
| "Due destini" | 2001 | Tiromancino | |
| "Passione" | 2007 | Neffa | |
| "Baciami ancora" | 2010 | Jovanotti | |
| "Londra brucia" | 2012 | Negramaro | |
| "Altrove e qui" | 2020 | Claudio Baglioni | |

== Awards and nominations ==
| Award | Year | Category | Nominated work | Result |
|---|---|---|---|---|
| 77th Venice International Film Festival | 2020 | Volpi Cup for Best Actor | Padrenostro | Won |
| Bari International Film Festival | 2015 | Imaie Award for Best Actor | Without Pity | Won |
| Berlin International Film Festival | 2006 | Bacco Award | Romanzo Criminale | Won |
| Ciak d'oro | 2005 | Best Supporting Actor | The Keys to the House | Won |
| Ciak d'oro | 2012 | Best Supporting Actor | Piazza Fontana: The Italian Conspiracy | Won |
| Ciak d'oro | 2020 | Best Actor | Hammamet | Nominated |
| Ciak d'oro | 2020 | Golden Superciak | Hammamet | Won |
| Ciak d'oro | 2022 | Best Actor | Nostalgia | Nominated |
| David di Donatello | 2003 | Best Supporting Actor | El Alamein: The Line of Fire | Nominated |
| David di Donatello | 2006 | Best Supporting Actor | Romanzo Criminale | Won |
| David di Donatello | 2010 | Best Supporting Actor | Kiss Me Again | Nominated |
| David di Donatello | 2012 | Best Supporting Actor | Piazza Fontana: The Italian Conspiracy | Won |
| David di Donatello | 2017 | Best Supporting Actor | The Confessions | Nominated |
| David di Donatello | 2020 | Best Actor | The Traitor | Won |
| David di Donatello | 2021 | Best Actor | Hammamet | Nominated |
| David di Donatello | 2024 | Best Actor | Comandante | Nominated |
| David di Donatello | 2025 | Best Supporting Actor | Naples to New York | Nominated |
| European Film Awards | 2019 | Best Actor | The Traitor | Nominated |
| European Film Awards | 2022 | Best Actor | Nostalgia | Nominated |
| Flaiano Awards | 2009 | Best Male Performance | Pane e libertà | Won |
| Flaiano Awards | 2012 | Performer of the Year | Himself | Won |
| Flaiano Awards | 2020 | Best Male Performance | Hammamet | Won |
| Globo d'oro | 2010 | Best Actor | Come Undone | Nominated |
| Globo d'oro | 2012 | Critics' Special Award | Piazza Fontana: The Italian Conspiracy | Won |
| Globo d'oro | 2013 | Best Actor | A Flat for Three | Nominated |
| Globo d'oro | 2019 | Best Actor | The Traitor | Nominated |
| Globo d'oro | 2023 | Best Actor | Hammamet | Won |
| Golden Graal | 2005 | Best Actor – Drama | The Keys to the House | Nominated |
| Golden Graal | 2006 | Best Actor – Drama | Romanzo Criminale | Nominated |
| Golden Graal | 2006 | Best Actor – Comedy | Sorry, You Can't Get Through! | Won |
| Golden Graal | 2007 | Best Actor – Drama | The Unknown Woman | Nominated |
| Golden Graal | 2008 | Best Actor – Drama | Saturn in Opposition | Won |
| Golden Graal | 2011 | Best Actor – Comedy | Unlikely Revolutionaries | Won |
| Nastro d'Argento | 2005 | Best Supporting Actor | The Keys to the House | Nominated |
| Nastro d'Argento | 2006 | Best Actor | Romanzo Criminale | Won |
| Nastro d'Argento | 2010 | Best Actor | Kiss Me Again | Nominated |
| Nastro d'Argento | 2012 | Best Actor | Piazza Fontana: The Italian Conspiracy | Won |
| Nastro d'Argento | 2015 | Best Actor | Without Pity | Nominated |
| Nastro d'Argento | 2016 | Best Actor | Suburra | Nominated |
| Nastro d'Argento | 2017 | Nino Manfredi Special Award | Moglie e marito | Won |
| Nastro d'Argento | 2019 | Best Actor | The Traitor | Won |
| Nastro d'Argento | 2020 | Best Actor | Hammamet | Won |
| Nastro d'Argento | 2021 | Best Actor | Padrenostro | Nominated |
| Nastro d'Argento | 2022 | Best Actor | Nostalgia | Won |
| Nastro d'Argento | 2023 | Best Actor | Last Night of Amore | Nominated |
| Pellicola d'oro | 2020 | Best Actor | The Traitor | Won |
| Pellicola d'oro | 2026 | Best Actor | My Tennis Maestro | Pending |
