= A Quiet Life =

- Italian: Una vita tranquilla
- Directed by: Claudio Cupellini
- Screenplay by: Filippo Gravino; Guido Iuculano; Claudio Cupellini
- Produced by: Fabrizio Mosca
- Starring: Toni Servillo; Marco D'Amore; Francesco Di Leva; Juliane Köhler; Maurizio Donadoni; Alice Dwyer; Leonardo Sprengler; Giovanni Ludeno
- Cinematography: Gergely Pohárnok
- Music by: Teho Teardo
- Release dates: 1 November 2010 (Rome Film Festival); 5 November 2010 (Italy)
- Running time: 105 minutes
- Languages: Italian; German; English

A Quiet Life (Italian: Una vita tranquilla) is a 2010 Italian neo-noir film directed by Claudio Cupellini. It entered the competition at the 2010 Rome International Film Festival, in which Toni Servillo was awarded for Best Actor.

== Plot ==
Antonio de Martino is living as Rosario Russo with his wife Renate and their young son Mathias in an idyllic place near Wiesbaden running a hotel and restaurant. He is wanted back in his home country of Italy and too many people have marked to kill him. For fifteen years, he has lived as a respected member of the town and a versatile cook. One day in his little hotel, his first son Diego and his friend Edoardo come to stay for a couple of days. They are planning to assassinate a manager of a waste incineration plant. What seemed peaceful with consistent pacing turns into chaos. He murders and disposes Diego's friend after he claims to know Rosarios identity. Diego reveals his father's identity to his backers. Getting doubts he tries to save his father's life but while trying to flee he is killed by Italian gang members. Antonio leaves his wife and son for their safety and is again on the run, looking back impassively Antonio boards a bus.

== Cast ==
- Toni Servillo: Rosario Russo / Antonio de Martino
- Marco D'Amore: Diego
- Francesco Di Leva: Edoardo
- Juliane Köhler: Renate
- Maurizio Donadoni: Claudio
- Alice Dwyer: Doris
- Leonardo Sprengler: Mathias
