= Rampini =

Rampini is an Italian surname. Notable people with the surname include:

- Alessandro Rampini (1896–1995), Italian footballer
- Carlo Rampini (1891–1968), Italian footballer
- Federico Rampini (born 1956), Italian journalist, writer and lecturer
- Giacomo Rampini (1680–1760), Italian composer of operas, oratorios and sacred music
- Jacopo Rampini (born 1986), actor
