= Serena de Ferrari =

Italian actress (born 1998)

- Born: 4 May 1998 (age 27); Turin, Piedmont, Italy
- Occupation: Actress
- Years active: 2020–present

Serena de Ferrari (born 4 May 1998) is an Italian actress.

== Life and career ==
Born in Turin in 1998, De Ferrari studied music for twelve years and classical singing for five between Rome and Milan. At the age of 16, she won a scholarship to the Manhattan School of Music in New York, where she lived with her sister Gaia for about five years. She began her acting career by enrolling at the Lee Strasberg Theatre and Film Institute.

In 2020, she landed her first role as a main cast member in the series The Sea Beyond, playing the villain Viola. That same year, she portrayed Vidya in the Netflix superhero series Zero. In 2022, she appeared in the Italian-French horror film The Bunker Game in a supporting role.

In 2024, De Ferrari was one of the protagonists of Giovanni Veronesi's comedy Romeo Is Juliet. The following year, she joined the main cast of the RAI series Belcanto, for the first time in a singing role.

== Personal life ==
De Ferrari has been in a relationship with music producer Gianluca Spettoli since 2023. The couple had a daughter, Amelia, born in March 2025.

== Filmography ==
Film
Year	Title	Role	Notes
2022	The Bunker Game	Clara	Feature film debut
2024	Romeo Is Juliet	Gemma	

Television
Year	Title	Role	Notes
2020–2023	The Sea Beyond	Viola Torri	TV series; main role
2021	Zero	Vidya	TV series; 7 episodes
2025	Belcanto	Maddalena Bellerio	TV series; main role
