= Selene Caramazza =

Italian actress (born 1993)

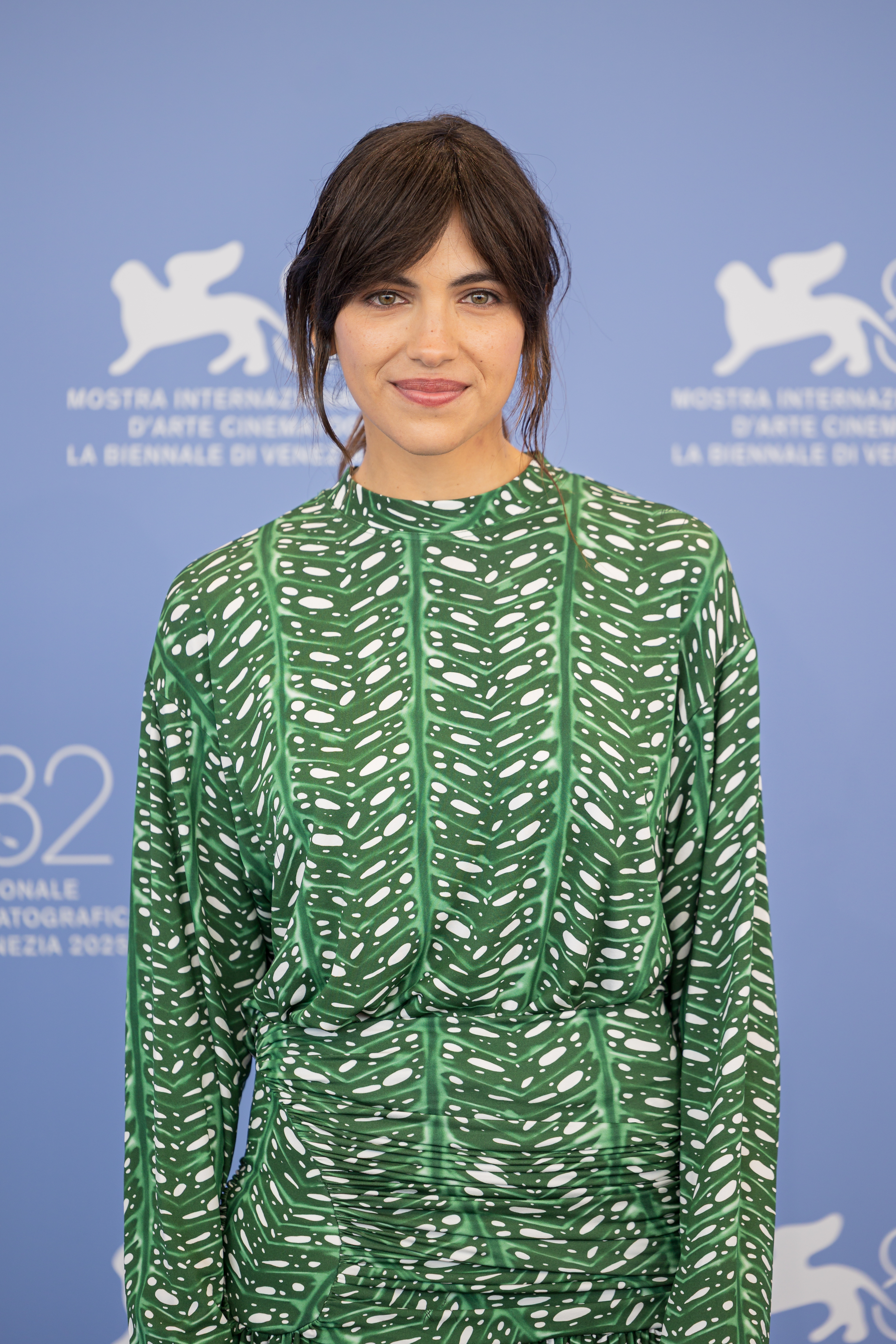
- Caramazza at the 82nd Venice International Film Festival in 2025
- Born: 10 February 1993 (age 33); Palermo, Italy
- Occupation: Actress
- Years active: 2015–present

Selene Caramazza (born 10 February 1993) is an Italian actress best known for her role as Leonarda Scotellaro in the Amazon Prime Video series The Bad Guy (2022–present).

== Biography ==
Caramazza was born in Palermo and grew up in Favara. She enrolled in university to study law in Palermo, but transferred at the end of her first year to study acting in Rome. Before becoming an actress, she originally wanted to be a director. In 2017, she made her film debut as Agnese in Pure Hearts, a role which earned her critical acclaim.

== Filmography ==
=== Film ===
Year	Title	Role	Notes	Ref.
2017	Pure Hearts	Agnese		
2019	Bar Joseph	Selene		
2020	Paradise - Una nuova vita	Lucia		
2021	Corpo e aria	Gaia	Short film	
2022	The Bone Breakers	Luisa		
2023	Uomo di fumo	Silvia		
2024	Beautiful Rebel	Carla		
2025	Arrivederci tristezza	Alessia		
2025	Tired of Killing: Autobiography of an Assassin	Angela		
2025	A Brief Affair	Actress in TV series		

=== Television ===
Year	Title	Role	Notes	Ref.
2015	Catturandi - Nel nome del padre	Sonia	2 episodes	
2015	Squadra antimafia - Palermo oggi	Sara	7 episodes	
2016	Don Matteo	Katia	1 episode	
2017	Il bello delle donne... alcuni anni dopo	Claudia	2 episodes	
2017	Provaci ancora prof!	Nancy Paone	1 episode	
2018	Cacciatore: The Hunter	Young Giada	6 episodes	
2018	Prima che la notte	Giusi	Television film	
2019	Inspector Montalbano	Alessandra/Anita	1 episode	
2020	The Sea Beyond	Valentina Colosimo	1 episode	
2020	Tutto il giorno davanti	Chiara	Television film	
2022	L'Ora - Inchiostro contro piombo	Olivia Butera	8 episodes	
2022	The Bad Guy	Leonarda Scotellaro	Main role; 6 episodes	
2022–2023	Christian	Benedetta	7 episodes	

== Awards and nominations ==
Award	Year	Category	Nominated work	Result	Ref.
Cerase Film Festival	2024	Television Personality of the Year	The Bad Guy, The Sea Beyond	Won	
Fabrique du Cinéma Awards	2017	Best Actress	Pure Hearts	Nominated	
Nastri d'Argento Grandi Serie	2023	Best Supporting Actress	The Bad Guy	Nominated	
Nastri d'Argento Grandi Serie	2023	Claudio Nobis Foundation Award		Won	
Seville European Film Festival	2017	Best Actress	Pure Hearts	Won	
Venice International Film Festival	2022	Rolling Stone Emerging Talents Award	Spaccaossa	Won	
