= Pilar Fogliati =

Italian actress (born 1992)

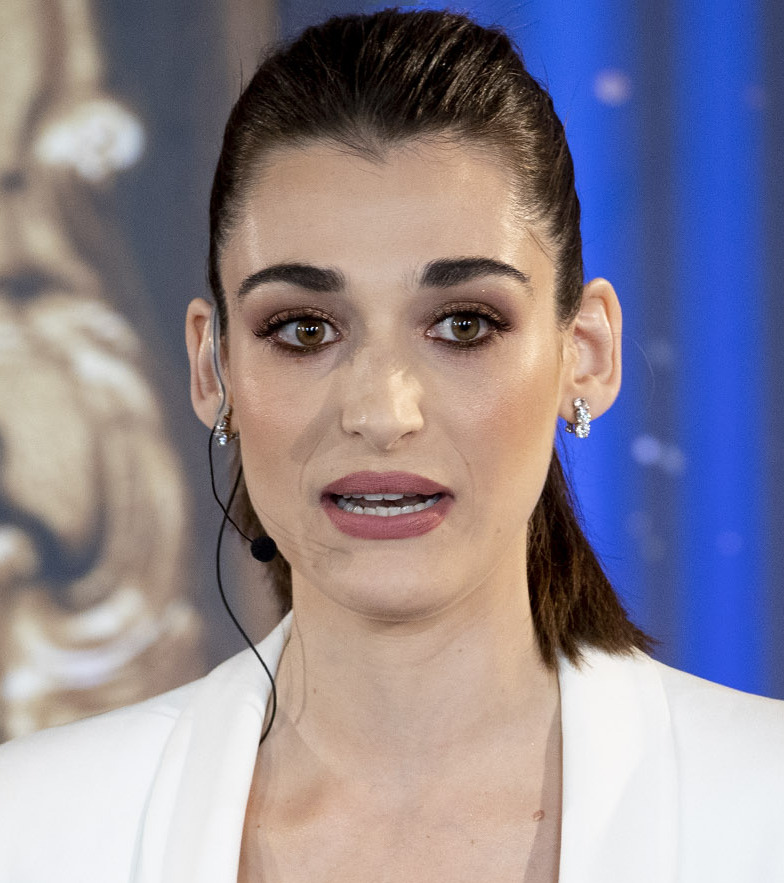
- Fogliati in 2022
- Born: María Del Pilar Fogliati; 28 December 1992 (age 33); Alessandria, Piedmont, Italy
- Occupations: Actress; writer; director

María del Pilar Fogliati (Italian pronunciation: [piˈlar foʎˈʎaːti]; born 28 December 1992) is an Italian actress and filmmaker.

== Life and career ==
Born in Alessandria to Roman parents who were there spending the Christmas holidays, Fogliati grew up in Mentana, near Rome. Her paternal grandmother was a woman who fled to Argentina from Poland. She formed at an amateur drama school before graduating from the Silvio d’Amico Academy of Dramatic Arts. After several stage roles, she made her film debut in 2016, in Fausto Brizzi's Forever Young. Also active on television, she was the lead actress in the Rai 1 medical drama Cuori and in the Netflix comedy series I Hate Christmas.

In 2022, Fogliati made her directorial and screenwriting debut with Romantic Girls, an anthology comedy film in which she played four different characters; for her performance she won a Nastro d'Argento for best actress in a comedy film and a Globo d'Oro for best actress. In 2024, she won a second Nastro d'Argento for best actress in a comedy film for Romeo Is Juliet.

== Filmography ==
=== Films ===
Year	Title	Role(s)	Notes
2016	Forever Young	Marika	
2020	The Time of Indifference	Guest	Uncredited
2022	Corro da te	Alessia	
2023	Romantic Girls	Eugenia Praticò / Uvetta Budini di Raso / Michela Trezza / Tazia De Tiberis	Also writer and director
2024	Romeo Is Juliet	Vittoria	Also writer
2024	IF	Blossom (voice)	Italian dub
2024	Inside Out 2	Anxiety (voice)	Italian dub
2024	Confidenza	Emma	
2024	Finché notte non ci separi	Eleonora	
2025	Madly	Lara	
2025	A Brief Affair	Lea	

=== Television ===
Year	Title	Role(s)	Notes
2015	Il bosco	Elisabetta "Betta" Miraglia	Main role
2016	Fuoco amico TF45 - Eroe per amore	Giulia De Santis	Main role
2017–2021	Un passo dal cielo	Emma Giorgi	Main role (seasons 4-5), recurring (season 6)
2019	ExtraVergine	Samira	Main role
2020	Purché finisca bene	Ines	Episode: "Mai scherzare con le stelle!"
2021–present	Cuori	Delia Brunello	Main role
2022–2023	I Hate Christmas	Gianna	Lead role
2025	Il Baracchino	Claudia (voice)	Lead role
2026	Sanremo Music Festival 2026	Herself / Co-host	Annual music festival, 2nd night

== Theatre ==
Title	Years	Role	Location / company
2011	The Madras House	Ensemble	Teatro del sogno, Rome
2012	Della Famiglia Maia	Ensemble	Teatro dell'Orologio, Rome
2012	Il Girotondo	Ensemble	Teatro dell'Orologio, Rome
2012	Officine Teatrali	Ensemble	Teatro Belli, Rome
2013	Ajax	Ensemble	Teatro Eleonora Duse, Rome
2013	I Messaggeri	Ensemble	Teatro Eleonora Duse, Rome
2013	Lungs	Ensemble	Festival dei Due Mondi, Spoleto
2013	Psicosi delle 4 E	Ensemble	Festival dei Due Mondi, Spoleto
2014	Baby Doll	Baby Doll	Festival dei Due Mondi, Spoleto
2014	Faust Diesis Metronomo e Diapason	Student	Teatro Eleonora Duse, Rome
2016	La Repubblica delle felicità	Hezel	Teatro Belli, Rome

== Accolades ==
Award	Year	Category	Nominated work	Result	Ref.
Ciak d'oro	2023	Best Directional Debout	Romantiche	Nominated	
Ciak d'oro	2023	Best Actress in a Television Serie	Odio il Natale	Nominated	
Globo d'oro	2023	Best Comedy	Romantiche	Won	
Globo d'oro	2023	Best First Feature	Romantiche	Nominated	
Globo d'oro	2023	Best Actress	Romantiche	Won	
Nastro d'argento	2023	Best Comedy	Romantiche	Nominated	
Nastro d'argento	2023	Best Actress in a Comedy	Romantiche	Won	
Nastro d'argento	2023	Wella Image Award	Herself	Won	
Nastro d'argento	2024	Best Actress in a Comedy	Romeo Is Juliet	Won	
Nastro d'argento	2025	Best Actress in a Comedy	Follemente	Won	
La Pellicola d'oro	2026	Best Lead Actress	A Brief Affair	Nominated	
Premio Flaiano	2024	Best Female Acting Performance	Romeo Is Juliet	Won	
