= The Thief of Falling Stars =

- Il ladro di stelle cadenti
- Directed by: Francisco Saia
- Written by: Paolo Picciolo
- Produced by: Paolo Picciolo
- Starring: Jacopo Rampini; Leandro Baroncini; Clizia Fornasier; Daniel McVicar
- Cinematography: Andrea Bizzoni; Gabriele Bizzoni
- Music by: Francesco Marzola
- Production companies: Horcynus Productions; DeeMedia Tv
- Distributed by: Emera Film
- Release date: October 17, 2024 (Italy)
- Running time: 89 minutes
- Countries: Italy; Malta
- Languages: Italian; English

The Thief of Falling Stars (Italian: Il ladro di stelle cadenti) is a 2024 Italian fantasy film directed by Francisco Saia. It is based on Patrizia Vicari's novel.

== Plot ==
At the age of eight, Camillo Favara (nicknamed "Milo") wishes upon a falling star for a giant chocolate cake. His wish is granted, but the experience ends in a painful indigestion. Ten years later, Milo makes another wish: to be loved by Betty, a beautiful Italian-American tourist. While they share an intense romance, Betty eventually leaves him, dismissively calling their relationship a mere summer fling and leaving him heartbroken.

Realizing that "when the gods want to punish us, they grant our prayers," Milo makes one final request to his star: the ability to help others avoid making the same wrong choices. His wish is fulfilled when he is recruited by an international organization known as "TFS – Thieves of Falling Stars." Granted magical powers, Milo begins his mission to intercept and correct the misguided desires people entrust to the stars.

== Cast ==
- Jacopo Rampini as Adult Milo
- Leandro Baroncini as Young Milo
- Clizia Fornasier as Adult Betty
- Daniel McVicar as Bartolo
- Denise McNee as Milo's mother
- Martina Palladini as Young Betty
- Francesco Bucca as Child Milo
- Hal Yamanouchi as TFS Leader

== Production ==
The film was produced by Horcynus Productions and filmed in Milazzo.

== Release ==
The film had its world premiere as the opening film of the 70th Taormina Film Fest, competing in the "Officina Sicilia" section. It was subsequently released in Italian cinemas on October 17, 2024.
