= The Bad Guy (TV series) =

Italian crime drama television series

- Genre: Crime drama; Comedy drama
- Written by: Ludovica Rampoldi; Davide Serino; Giuseppe G. Stasi
- Directed by: Giancarlo Fontana; Giuseppe G. Stasi
- Starring: Luigi Lo Cascio; Claudia Pandolfi; Vincenzo Pirrotta; Selene Caramazza; Giulia Maenza; Antonio Catania; Fabrizio Ferracane; Ivano Calafato; Alessandro Lui; Antonio Zavatteri; Francesco Zenzola; Enrico Lo Verso; Vittorio Magazzù; Souleymane Seye Ndiaye; Ivan Giambirtone; Mimmo Mignemi; Guia Jelo
- Country of origin: Italy
- Original language: Italian
- No. of series: 2
- No. of episodes: 12

Production
- Executive producers: Carlotta Calori; Francesca Cima; Nicola Giuliano; Viola Prestieri
- Producers: Fabiomassimo Dell'Orco; Andrea Passalacqua
- Cinematography: Gian Enrico Bianchi
- Production companies: Indigo Film; Amazon MGM Studios

Original release
- Network: Amazon Prime Video
- Release: 8 December 2022 – present

The Bad Guy is a 2022 Italian crime drama television series directed by Giancarlo Fontana and Giuseppe G. Stasi. It was internationally released on Amazon Prime Video on 8 December 2022. The second season premiered on 4 December 2024.

== Premise ==
Nino Scotellaro is a Sicilian magistrate who spent his career targeting and prosecuting Cosa Nostra affiliates. When he is accused of having Mafia ties and imprisoned, he sets out on a plan of revenge.

== Cast ==
=== Main ===
- Luigi Lo Cascio as Nino Scotellaro
- Claudia Pandolfi as Luvi Bray
- Vincenzo Pirrotta as Salvatore Tracina
- Selene Caramazza as Leonarda Scotellaro
- Giulia Maenza as Teresa Suro
- Antonio Catania as Mariano Suro
- Fabrizio Ferracane as Cataldo Silvio Maria Palamita
- Ivano Calafato as Vincenzuccio Tracina
- Alessandro Lui as Matteo Boccanera
- Antonio Zavatteri as Gianfranco Costardello
- Francesco Zenzola as Nicola Pizzilli
- Enrico Lo Verso as Ernesto Lanzardo
- Vittorio Magazzù as Domenico Cuore
- Souleymane Seye Ndiaye as Mario
- Ivan Giambirtone as Emanuele Grongo
- Mimmo Mignemi as Giuseppe Perchia "U' Seccu"
- Guia Jelo as Giusy Corifena
- Bebo Storti as Francesco Maria Mormora

=== Recurring ===
- Vincenzo Alfieri as Mirko Carlini
- Anastasia Doaga as Katerina
- Barbara Tabita as Priscilla Suro
- Claudio Ciria as Francesco Zerro
- Alessio Ciria as Manfredi Zerro
- Luis Pan Venezia as Dwayne LeBlanc
- Paolo Macedonio as Biagio Sigano "Gaza"
- Federico Parlanti as Sigano's waiter
- Andrea Trovato as Luigi
- Dario Battaglia as Arturo
- Gabriele Cicirello as Amleto
- Nicoletta Carbonara as Nicola's wife
- Aurora Quattrocchi as Natalia
- Alfio Sorbello as Santino Cavalcanti
- Marco Ripoldi as Ercole Pagro
- Désirée Giorgetti as Ercole Pagro's wife
- Emma Trovarelli as Sofia Pagro
- Mario Pupella as Onofrio Dragonetto, capomandamento of Ciaculli
- Toni Pandolfo as Egidio Sciarrano, capomandamento of Cinisi
- Natale Russo as Lillo Donzella, capomandamento of Bocca di Falco
- Vincenzo Failla as the capodecina of Cinisi
- Alfredo Li Bassi as the capodecina of Calatafimi
- Giuseppe Lo Piccolo as the capodecina of Bocca di Falco
- Dario Tindaro Veca as the capodecina of Passo di Rigano
- Simone Bonelli as Mimì Starnace
- Marco Marelli as Paolo Bray's actor
- Antonella Liuzzi as Luvi Bray's actress
- Romina Caruana as Giusy Corifena's actress
- Renato Zappalà as Mr. Casà, Bray and Boccanera's client

=== Guests ===
- Valentina Bendicenti as herself
- Enrico Mentana as himself
- Andrea Purgatori as himself
- Dalila Setti as herself
- Tess Masazza as a guide in Wowterworld
- Colapesce and Dimartino as the Wowterworld theme's singers
- Frank Matano as the stage director

== Episodes ==
No. in season	Title	Duration	Original release date
1	"The good magistrate" "Il magistrato buono"	55 min	8 December 2022
2	"Moles" "Talpe"	57 min	8 December 2022
3	"Tu quoque…"	50 min	8 December 2022
4	"Nature can't be stopped" "La natura non si ferma"	56 min	15 December 2022
5	"I saw a light" "Vitti 'a luce"	47 min	15 December 2022
6	"At which moment in time" "/al·lor·quàn·do/"	50 min	15 December 2022

== Awards and nominations ==
Year	Award	Category	Nominee	Result	Ref.
2023	Ciak d'Oro Serie TV	Best Italian Series	The Bad Guy	Nominated	
2023	Ciak d'Oro Serie TV	Most Innovative Series	The Bad Guy	Won	
2023	Nastri d'Argento Grandi Serie	Best Series	The Bad Guy	Nominated	
2023	Nastri d'Argento Grandi Serie	Best Actor	Luigi Lo Cascio	Nominated	
2023	Nastri d'Argento Grandi Serie	Best Actress	Claudia Pandolfi	Nominated	
2023	Nastri d'Argento Grandi Serie	Best Supporting Actress	Selene Caramazza	Nominated	
