= The Bunker Game =

- Directed by: Roberto Zazzara
- Written by: Roberto Zazzara; Davide Orsini; Francesca Forristal; KT Roberts
- Produced by: Jad Ben Ammar; Leo Maidenberg
- Starring: Gaia Weiss; Lorenzo Richelmy; Mark Ryder; Amina Ben Ismaïl; Tudor Istodor; Makita Samba
- Cinematography: Marco Graziaplena
- Edited by: Brian Schmitt
- Music by: Umberto Smerilli
- Production companies: Eagle Pictures; Kador; Place du Marché
- Distributed by: Terror Films
- Release date: 24 February 2022 (Russia)
- Running time: 95 minutes
- Countries: France; Italy
- Language: English

The Bunker Game is a 2022 French-Italian horror film directed by Roberto Zazzara, starring Gaia Weiss, Lorenzo Richelmy, Mark Ryder, Amina Ben Ismaïl, Tudor Istodor and Makita Samba.

== Cast ==
- Gaia Weiss as Laura
- Lorenzo Richelmy as Gregorio
- Mark Ryder as Harry
- Amina Ben Ismaïl as Yasmine
- Tudor Istodor as Andrej
- Makita Samba as Marcus
- Felice Jankell as Robin
- Serena de Ferrari as Clara
- Léa Rostain as Jenny
- Nicolo Pasetti as Kurt

== Release ==
The film was released on Shudder on 17 March 2022.

== Reception ==
Matt Donato of Paste gave the film a rating of 5.5/10 and wrote that there it has "few screams outside predictable jump scares" and is "slack in suspense". FilmTv.it rated the film 2 stars out of 5.

Ian Sedensky of Culture Crypt gave the film a score of 45 out of 100 and wrote that at its best it "might be considered a decent thriller among mid to low-level horror titles", but at its worst it "foolishly punts away its most interesting aspects for unknown reasons only the filmmakers could explain." Sean Parker of Horror Obsessive called the film "poorly paced and wildly unconcise" and a "waste of potential".
