= A Brief Affair (film) =

- Breve storia d'amore
- Directed by: Ludovica Rampoldi
- Written by: Ludovica Rampoldi
- Starring: Pilar Fogliati; Adriano Giannini; Andrea Carpenzano; Valeria Golino
- Cinematography: Gogò Bianchi
- Edited by: Francesca Calvelli
- Music by: Fabio Massimo Capogrosso
- Production companies: Indigo Film; HT Film; Rai Cinema
- Release date: 2025
- Country: Italy

A Brief Affair (Italian: Breve storia d'amore, lit. 'Short love story') is a 2025 Italian film written and directed by Ludovica Rampoldi. It was the first film directed by Rampoldi and grossed 738,729 €.

== Plot ==
Seismologist Rocco spends his Friday nights at a gym, alternating between boxing and chess matches. After the gym he goes to a neighbouring bar, where one evening he meets Lea. A few days later Lea sees him near her workplace and they begin a relationship. Learning that Rocco's wife Cecilia is a psychoanalyst, Lea meets her at a shooting range where Cecilia trains and asks her for a consultation, expressing her distress, convinced that her partner Andrea is cheating on her. Eventually, the four protagonists meet again and make up their differences.

== Cast ==
- Pilar Fogliati as Lea
- Adriano Giannini as Rocco
- Andrea Carpenzano as Andrea
- Valeria Golino as Cecilia
- Massimo De Lorenzo as Umberto
- Betty Pedrazzi as the barista
- Monica Nappo as Adele
- Lorenzo Gioielli as Sergio
- Pia Engleberth as the pianist
- Giselda Volodi as the hotel receptionist
- Selene Caramazza as TV series actress
- Giulia Maenza as TV series actress

== Production ==
There was seven weeks' shooting from April to June 2024 in Rome and Naples.

== Distribution ==
It premiered on 16 October 2025 in that year's Rome Film Festival and was released in Italian cinemas on 27 November 2025, distributed by 01 Distribution.

== Awards ==
- David di Donatellos 2026
  - Best New Director (nomination) for Ludovica Rampoldi
  - Best Supporting Actress (nomination) for Valeria Golino
- La pellicola d'oro 2026
  - Best lead actress (nomination) for Pilar Fogliati
