= Luigi Lo Cascio =

Italian actor (born 1967)

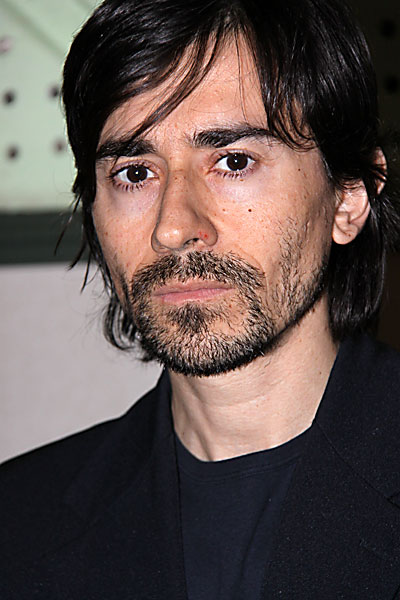
- Lo Cascio in 2009
- Born: 20 October 1967 (age 58); Palermo, Italy
- Occupations: Actor, film director, writer
- Height: 1.70 m (5 ft 7 in)

Luigi Lo Cascio (born 20 October 1967) is an Italian actor. He won the David di Donatello as best actor for his starring role in I cento passi. In 2012, he debuted as film director and writer with La città ideale.

== Filmography ==
=== Films ===
Year	Title	Role(s)	Notes
2000	One Hundred Steps	Giuseppe Impastato	
2001	Light of My Eyes	Antonio	
2002	The Best Day of My Life	Claudio Mazzoni	
2003	The Best of Youth	Nicola Carati	
2003	Good Morning, Night	Mariano	
2003	Mio cognato	Vito	
2004	Eyes of Crystal	Inspector Giacomo Amaldi	
2004	The Life That I Want	Stefano	
2005	Don't Tell	Daniele	
2006	Mare nero	Luca	
2007	The Sweet and the Bitter	Saro Scordia	
2008	Wild Blood	The partisian	Cameo appearance
2008	Miracle at St. Anna	Adult Angelo Torancelli	
2009	The Friends at the Margherita Cafe	Manuelo	
2009	Baarìa	Beggard's son	Cameo appearance
2010	We Believed	Domenico Lopresti	
2012	Piazza Fontana: The Italian Conspiracy	Judge Ugo Paolillo	
2012	The Ideal City	Michele	
2013	Salvo	Enzo Puleo	
2013	Marina	Salvatore Granata	
2013	Human Capital	Donato Russomanno	
2014	The Dinner	Paolo	
2015	An Italian Name	Sandro De Luca	
2017	I Can Quit Whenever I Want: Masterclass	Walter Mercurio	
2017	I Can Quit Whenever I Want: Ad Honorem	Walter Mercurio	
2018	Il mangiatore di pietre	Cesare	
2019	The Traitor	Salvatore Contorno	
2020	The Ties	Aldo	
2022	Lord of the Ants	Aldo Braibanti	
2022	The Bone Breakers	Machinetta	
2022	Chiara	Gregorio IX	
2023	Delta	Osso	

=== Television ===
Year	Title	Role(s)	Notes
2012	Il sogno del maratoneta	Dorando Pietri	Television movie
2013	Il bambino cattivo	Michele	Television movie
2022	The Bad Guy	Nino Scotellaro	Main role

== Theatre ==
- 1989: Aspettando Godot
- 1989: I coralli
- 1990: La sposa
- 1992: La Signora delle Camelie
- 1992: La morte di Empedocle
- 1994: Il labirinto di Orfeo
- 1994: Coriolano
- 1995: Verso Tebe
- 1996: Romeo e Giulietta
- 1997: La famiglia Scroffenstein
- 1997: Gloria del Teatro Immaginario
- 1997: La figlia dell'Aria
- 1998: Salomè
- 1999: Il figlio di Pulcinella
- 1999: Amleto
- 1999: Sogno di una notte di mezza estate
- 2006: Nella tana
- 2008: La caccia

== Awards and nominations ==
Year	Award	Category	Result	Ref.
2023	Nastri d'Argento Grandi Serie	Best Actor	Nominated	
