= Mark Ryder =

Actor from Northern Ireland

- Born: Northern Ireland
- Education: Methodist College Belfast
- Occupation: Actor
- Known for: Borgia

Mark Ryder is an actor from Northern Ireland who was educated at Methodist College Belfast. He is most noted for his television role as Cesare Borgia in the historical drama series, Borgia.

== Filmography ==
Film
Year	Title	Role	Notes
2009	Five Minutes of Heaven	Young Alistair Little	Credited as Mark Davison
2010	Robin Hood	Baron Baldwin's Grandson	Credited as Mark David
2011	Albatross	Rich	
2011	Libertatia (short)	Gabriel	Credited as Mark David
2012	Good Vibrations	Greg	
2017	Two Black Coffees (short)	The Hero	
2019	Sisters in Arms	Al Britani	
2020	The Argument	Actor Jack	
2022	The Bunker Game	Harry	

Television
Year	Title	Role	Notes
2009	Small Island	Kip	Credited as Mark Beaknose Davison
2010	Coming Up	The Leader	Episode: "Boy"
2011–2014	Borgia	Cesare Borgia	Main role
2019–2022	City on a Hill	Father Doyle	Supporting role
2024	Law & Order	Robbie McDougall	Episode: "Unintended Consequences"
