= Tired of Killing: Autobiography of an Assassin =

2025 film by Daniele Vicari

- Theatrical release poster
- Italian: Ammazzare stanca. Autobiografia di un assassino
- Directed by: Daniele Vicari
- Written by: Daniele Vicari; Andrea Cedrola
- Based on: Ammazzare stanca by Antonio Zagari
- Produced by: Pier Giorgio Bellocchio; Antonio Manetti; Marco Manetti
- Starring: Gabriel Montesi; Vinicio Marchioni; Selene Caramazza
- Cinematography: Gherardo Gossi
- Edited by: Benni Atria
- Music by: Teho Teardo
- Production companies: Mompracem; Rai Cinema; Beta Film
- Distributed by: 01 Distribution
- Release dates: 2 September 2025 (Venice); 4 December 2025 (Italy)
- Country: Italy
- Languages: Italian; Calabrian; Varese; Sicilian

Tired of Killing: Autobiography of an Assassin (Italian: Ammazzare stanca. Autobiografia di un assassino) is a 2025 Italian biographical drama film co-written and directed by Daniele Vicari, based on the autobiography Ammazzare stanca by Antonio Zagari. It stars Gabriel Montesi, Vinicio Marchioni, and Selene Caramazza.

The film had its world premiere in the Venice Spotlight section of the 82nd Venice International Film Festival on 2 September 2025. It received a theatrical release in Italy on 4 December.

== Cast ==
- Gabriel Montesi as Antonio Zagari
- Vinicio Marchioni as Giacomo Zagari
- Selene Caramazza as Angela
- Andrea Fuorto as Enzo Zagari
- Thomas Trabacchi
- Pier Giorgio Bellocchio as Colonel Becker
- Rocco Papaleo as Don Peppino Pesce
- Francesco La Mantia
- Vincenzo Zampa
- Aglaia Mora
- Cristiana Vaccaro
- Enrico Salimbeni
- Saverio Malara

== Production ==
Principal photography took place in Emilia-Romagna and Calabria. The film was shot over eight weeks, wrapping in late 2024.

== Release ==
A promotional clip was released on 28 August 2025. The film had its world premiere in the Venice Spotlight section of the 82nd Venice International Film Festival on 2 September 2025. It received a theatrical release in Italy on 4 December 2025.
