= Confidenza =

2024 Italian film

- Directed by: Daniele Luchetti
- Screenplay by: Daniele Luchetti; Francesco Piccolo
- Produced by: Indiana Production; Vision Distribution
- Starring: Elio Germano; Federica Rosellini; Vittoria Puccini; Pilar Fogliati; Isabella Ferrari
- Cinematography: Ivan Casalgrandi
- Edited by: Ael Dallier Vega
- Music by: Thom Yorke
- Release date: April 24, 2024 (International Film Festival Rotterdam)
- Running time: 136 minutes
- Country: Italy
- Language: Italian

Confidenza (English: Trust) is a 2024 Italian thriller film co-written and directed by Daniele Luchetti. It is an adaptation of Domenico Starnone's 2019 novel of the same name.

== Plot ==
A teacher reveals a terrible secret to a former student he is romantically involved with. The secret has the potential to destroy his life, forging a life-long bond between them. After they part ways, however, their bond persists, even in the wake of the teacher's professional success and his marriage.

== Cast ==
- Elio Germano as Pietro
- Federica Rosellini as Teresa
- Vittoria Puccini as Nadia
- Pilar Fogliati as Emma
- Isabella Ferrari as Tilde
- Roberto Latini as Marcello
- Luca Gallone as Franchino Gilara
- Giordano De Plano as Itrò
- Bruno Orlando as Claudio Petrini
- Elena Bouryka as Giovanna

== Release ==
The film had its world premiere in the International Film Festival Rotterdam.

== Soundtrack ==
The film's music was composed by Thom Yorke, with orchestration by Hugh Brunt. It includes performances by Yorke, the London Contemporary Orchestra, and a jazz ensemble that includes Tom Herbert, Tom Skinner, Byron Wallen, Pete Wareham and others. The soundtrack was released as Confidenza: Music for the Film by Daniele Luchetti on 26 April 2024 through XL Recordings.
