= U.S. Palmese (film) =

2024 film by the Manetti Bros.

- Italian theatrical release poster
- Directed by: Manetti Bros.
- Written by: Manetti Bros.; Luna Gualano; Emiliano Rubbi
- Produced by: Manetti Bros.; Pier Giorgio Bellocchio
- Starring: Rocco Papaleo; Blaise Afonso; Giulia Maenza; Claudia Gerini
- Cinematography: Angelo Sorrentino
- Edited by: Federico Maria Maneschi
- Music by: Pivio and Aldo De Scalzi
- Production companies: Mompracem; Rai Cinema
- Distributed by: 01 Distribution
- Release dates: 17 October 2024 (Rome); 20 March 2025 (Italy)
- Running time: 122 minutes
- Country: Italy
- Language: Italian

U.S. Palmese is a 2024 Italian sports comedy film directed by the Manetti Bros. It stars Rocco Papaleo, Blaise Afonso, Giulia Maenza, and Claudia Gerini. It premiered at the 19th Rome Film Festival on 17 October 2024 and received a theatrical release in Italy on 20 March 2025.

== Premise ==
A Calabrian farmer from Palmi organizes a fundraiser to purchase a disgraced star footballer for his local team, US Palmese 1912.

== Cast ==
- Rocco Papaleo as Don Vincenzo
- Blaise Afonso as Etienne Morville
- Giulia Maenza as Concetta, Don Vincenzo's daughter
- Claudia Gerini as Adele Ferraro
- Gianfelice Imparato as Professor Macrì
- Massimiliano Bruno as Rocco Zampogna
- Massimo De Lorenzo as Tripodi
- Guglielmo Favilla Peppi 'Mpiccia
- Aurora Calabresi as Adriana
- Lisa Do Couto Teixeira as Sandrine
- Max Mazzotta as Mimi Bagalà
- Giuseppe Futia as Melo Fiorino
- Mario Russo
- Luca Attadia
- Salvatore Costa
- Adriano Fedele
- Guillaume de Tonquédec as Gilbert Desagnat
- Antonio di Turi as Nicola Malagó
- Vincenzo Scuruchi as Giovanni Pugliese
- Antonio Di Turi as Nicola Malagó
- Leo Ferrari as Indovino

== Production ==
=== Development ===
The film is set in Palmi, Calabria, the hometown of the Manetti Bros.' mother and where the duo spent their childhood summers. The idea for the film came from a childhood memory of the Manetti Bros.: at an amateur football match, a man joked that if everyone in town pooled their money, they could raise enough funds to buy Diego Maradona for the local team. Marco Manetti stated, "This was a formative memory for us, this crazy old man wanting to collect enough money to buy the best player in the world."

Further, the directors wanted to tell a story set in Southern Italy "away from the Gomorrahs". They stated, "The South is always told with a negative rhetoric: crime, negative constraint and even folklore. But we want to tell something else, because sometimes the South self-destructs with a self-destructive story."

=== Filming ===
As the Manetti Bros. wanted their actors to speak the Palmese dialect, the cast studied the dialect in Palmi in the weeks before filming. Principal photography began on 22 May 2023. Filming took place over eight weeks in Palmi, as well as Paris and Milan. Filming was completed on 11 July 2023.

== Release ==
The film premiered at the 19th Rome Film Festival on 17 October 2024. It was featured in the Limelight section of the 54th International Film Festival Rotterdam in February 2025. It will be released by 01 Distribution in Italy on 20 March 2025.

== Reception ==
Valeria Maiolino of Mymovies.it gave the film three out of five stars, writing, "It is not a film of the head, but above all of the heart. For this reason it is contagious with its cheerfulness and positivity."

Valerio Sammarco of Cinematografo gave the film three out of five stars, writing that "the spirit that has always animated [the Manetti Bros.'] various works does not fail, the ambition to make oneself loved by chasing apparently impossible stories, like this one of Etienne (a curious mix between Balotelli and Leão...) and of Palmi.

Damiano Panattoni of Movieplayer.it gave the film three out of five stars and called it "[a] lighthearted work, at times distracted, which, if it doesn't work on the humorous level, instead gains on the football factor, explaining the reasons why sports cinema always works very well."

Valeria Maiolino of Cinefilos gave the film three out of five stars, writing, "The Manetti Bros., with genuine writing, demonstrate that they know how to touch the right narrative chords to excite and make even those who understand little or nothing about football feel actively involved."

Federico Gironi of ComingSoon.it gave the film two-and-a-half out of five stars, calling it "a feel-good movie that is a bit confused and not very original", drawing parallels with Taika Waititi's Next Goal Wins.

== Awards and nominations ==
Award	Year	Category	Recipient(s)	Result	Ref.
Nastri d'Argento	2025	Best Comedy	U.S. Palmese	Nominated	
Nastri d'Argento	2025	Best Comedy Actor	Rocco Papaleo	Nominated	

== See also ==
- List of association football films
