= Premio Hemingway =

The Premio Hemingway (Hemingway Prize) is an international art award established by the municipality of Lignano Sabbiadoro, Italy in 1984.

Lignano, situated on a small peninsula between Venice and Trieste is a place where Ernest Hemingway spent much time.

Each year a jury awards a series of awards for excellence in literature and related fields. The awards are announced at a glittering ceremony in June.

The Prize is promoted by the Municipality of Lignano Sabbiadoro with the support of the Departments of Culture and Productive Activities and Tourism of the Friuli-Venezia Giulia Region and the Pordenonelegge Foundation which was founded in 2013 by the Chamber of Commerce of Pordenone and local trade associations.

== Award winners ==
2025

- Literature – Alicia Giménez Bartlett
- Adventures of thought – Venki Ramakrishnan
- Witness of our time – Cecilia Sala
- Photography – Cesare Gerolimetto
- Special Prize Citta di Lignano – Kingsley Felicia

2024

- Literature – Benjamin Labatut
- Adventures of thought – Vittorino Andreoli
- Witness of our time – Irina Ščerbakova
- Photography – Francesco Finotto
- Special Prize Citta di Lignano – Vincenzo Schettini

2023

- Literature – Amélie Nothomb
- Adventures of thought – Carlo Ginzburg
- Witness of our time – Shirin Ebadi
- Photography – Marco Zanta
- Special Prize Citta di Lignano – Antonio Fantin

2022

- Literature – Margaret Mazzantini
- Adventures of thought – Elena Cattaneo
- Witness of our time – Pierfrancesco Diliberto
- Photography – Mario Peliti

2021

- Literature – Dacia Maraini
- Adventures of thought – Stefano Mancuso
- Witness of our time – Carlo Verdone
- Photography – Franco Fontana

2020

- Literature – David Grossman
- Adventures of thought – Alessandro Barbero
- Witness of our time – Samantha Cristoforetti
- Photography – Guido Guidi

2019

- Literature – Emmanuel Carrère
- Adventures of thought – Eva Cantarella
- Witness of our time – Federico Rampini
- Photography – Riccardo Zipoli
- Special Prize Citta di Lignano – Franca Leosini

2018

- Literature – Annie Ernaux
- Adventure of thought – Antonio Damasio
- Witness of our time – Lilli Gruber
- Photography – Francesca Della Toffola

2017

- Literature – Zadie Smith
- Adventure of thought – Slavoj Žižek
- Witness of our time – Massimo Recalcati
- Photography – Nino Migliori

2016

- Literature – Luis Sepúlveda
- Adventure of thought – Massimo Cacciari
- Life and work – Aharon Appelfeld
- Photography – George Tatge

2015

- Literature – Corrado Augias
- Adventure of thought – Richard Sennet
- Photo book: Luca Campigotto
- Reportage – William Dalrymple

2014

- Literature – Abraham Yehoshua
- Adventure of thought – Zygmunt Bauman
- Photo reportage – Alice Albinia
- Photo book: Guido Guidi

2013

- Literature – Giuseppe Furno
- Journalism – Shoma Chaudhury
- Photo reportage – Yuri Kozyrev
- Free spirit – Enrico Calamai
- Special prize – Enea Fabris-Stralignano
