= The Bone Breakers =

- Directed by: Vincenzo Pirrotta
- Screenplay by: Vincenzo Pirrotta; Ignazio Rosato; Salvatore Ficarra; Valentino Picone
- Produced by: Attilio De Razza; Nicola Picone
- Starring: Vincenzo Pirrotta; Selene Caramazza; Aurora Quattrocchi; Ninni Bruschetta
- Cinematography: Daniele Ciprì
- Edited by: Agathe Cauvin
- Music by: Alessio Bondì; Fabio Rizzo; Aki Spadaro
- Release date: 2022
- Language: Italian

The Bone Breakers (Italian: Spaccaossa) is a 2022 Italian crime drama film co-written and directed by Vincenzo Pirrotta, in his directorial debut.

The film premiered at the 79th edition of the Venice Film Festival, in the Giornate degli Autori sidebar. For this film, Pirrotta was nominated for the David di Donatello for best new director.

== Cast ==
- Vincenzo Pirrotta as Vincenzo
- Selene Caramazza as Luisa
- Aurora Quattrocchi as Giovanna
- Ninni Bruschetta as Francesco
- Simona Malato as Maria
- Luigi Lo Cascio as Machinetta
- Maziar Firouzi as Fasulina
- Filippo Luna as Mimmo
- Giovanni Calcagno as Michele
