= Romantic Girls =

- Directed by: Pilar Fogliati
- Screenplay by: Giovanni Nasta; Giovanni Veronesi; Pilar Fogliati
- Starring: Pilar Fogliati; Barbora Bobuľová
- Cinematography: Davide Leone
- Edited by: Davide Miele
- Music by: Levante
- Release date: 2023
- Language: Italian

Romantic Girls (Italian: Romantiche) is a 2023 Italian anthology comedy film co-written and directed by Pilar Fogliati, at her directorial debut. Based on a series of viral skits that Fogliati had posted on the web and later adapted in the radio program Non è un paese per giovani, it has Fogliati playing four characters from different geographical and social backgrounds. For her performance she got a Nastro d'Argento for best actress in a comedy film and a Globo d'Oro for best actress. The film also won the Globo d'Oro for best comedy film.

== Cast ==
- Pilar Fogliati as
  - Eugenia Praticò, an aspiring screenwriter who moved from Sicily to Rome in search of success
  - Uvetta Budini di Raso, a young and naive aristocrat finding her place in the world
  - Michela Trezza, a young woman about to get married struggling with the comeback of her childhood ex-boyfriend
  - Tazia De Tiberis, a young woman from Parioli who is determinated to have control on her partner's life
- Barbora Bobuľová as Dr. Valeria Panizzi, the four protagonist's analyst
- Diane Fleri as Susanna Celeno, an editor infatuated for Eugenia
- Laura Martinelli as Lia, Eugenia's roommate and aspiring singer who will win the next Amici di Maria De Filippi season
- Maria Giulia Toscano as Moma, Eugenia's roommate and aspiring actress
- Levante as herself, who helps Lia with her music
- Luca Di Prospero as Achille, Levante's sound engineer who has a one-night stand with Eugenia
- Giovanni Toscano as Sanis Bonplapp del Pioppo, Uvetta's boyfriend who's also revealed to be her cousin
- Rosanna Gentili as Aunt Ottavia, Uvetta's aunt
- Rodolfo Laganà as Mario Tozzi, Uvetta's boss at the bakery
- Ibrahim Keshke as Kamal, Uvetta's co-worker at the bakery who falls in love with her
- Emanuele Propizio as Ivano Tozzi, a policeman engaged with Michela
- Giovanni Anzaldo as Fausto, an ambiguous man for which Michela had a crush in the past who's back in the town
- Ubaldo Pantani as Father Patrick, a priest and Michela's confident
- Agnese Claisse as Erica, Michela's friend and successful author
- Edoardo Purgatori ad Riccardo "Ricky", Tazia's partner who cheats on her with an escort
- Eleonora De Laurentis as Livia, Tazia's best friend
- Maria Chiara Centorami as Rula, an escort who slept with Ricky. At the end of movie is revealed to be Lia's sister.
- Jacopo Rampini as Ranieri.
