= Zero (2021 TV series) =

Italian television series

- Also known as: 0
- Genre: Superhero
- Created by: Menotti
- Based on: Non ho mai avuto la mia età by Antonio Dikele Distefano
- Starring: Giuseppe Dave Seke: Haroun Fall; Beatrice Grannò; Richard Dylan Magon; Daniela Scattolin; Madior Fall; Virginia Diop; Alex Van Damme; Frank Crudele; Giordano de Plano; Ashai Lombardo Arop; Roberta Mattei; Miguel Gobbo Diaz; Livio Kone
- Composer: Yakamoto Kotzuga
- Country of origin: Italy
- Original language: Italian
- No. of episodes: 8

Production
- Executive producers: Marco De Angelis; Nicola De Angelis
- Producer: David Fischer
- Cinematography: Daniele Ciprì

Original release
- Network: Netflix
- Release: 21 April 2021

Zero is a 2021 Italian television series starring Giuseppe Dave Seke, Haroun Fall and Beatrice Grannò, based on the novel Non ho mai avuto la mia età by Antonio Dikele Distefano. It was released internationally on Netflix on April 21, 2021. On September 17, 2021, the series was canceled after one season.

== Premise ==
Omar is a second generation Italian boy of Senegalese descent who lives in public housing within a suburb of Milan. Shy to the point of feeling invisible, this turns into an extraordinary superpower, which makes him actually invisible when feeling strong emotion.

His story is intertwined with that of other kids from the estate who want to preserve their homes and the neighbourhood in which they grew up that is threatened by building developers.

== Cast ==
- Giuseppe Dave Seke as Omar/Zero
- Haroun Fall as Sharif
- Beatrice Grannò as Anna Ricci
- Richard Dylan Magon as Momo
- Daniela Scattolin as Sara
- Madior Fall as Inno
- Virginia Diop as Awa
- Miguel Gobbo Diaz as Rico
- Frank Crudele as Sandokan
- Ashai Lombardo Arop as Marieme
- Serena de Ferrari as Vidya
- Susanna Acchiardi as Carolina
- Alex Van Damme as Thierno
- Roberta Mattei as The Virgin
- Giordano de Plano as Andrea Ricci

== Episodes ==
| No. | Title | Directed by | Written by | Original release date |
|---|---|---|---|---|
| 1 | "Episode 1" | Paola Randi | Story by : Massimo Vavassori, Antonio Dikele Distefano, Stefano Voltaggio, Lisandro Monaco & Carolina Cavalli; Teleplay by : Antonio Dikele Distefano & Massimo Vavassori | 21 April 2021 |
| 2 | "Episode 2" | Mohamed Hossameldin | Story by : Massimo Vavassori, Antonio Dikele Distefano, Stefano Voltaggio, Lisandro Monaco & Carolina Cavalli; Teleplay by : Antonio Dikele Distefano & Massimo Vavassori | 21 April 2021 |
| 3 | "Episode 3" | Paola Randi | Story by : Massimo Vavassori, Antonio Dikele Distefano, Stefano Voltaggio, Lisandro Monaco & Carolina Cavalli; Teleplay by : Stefano Voltaggio | 21 April 2021 |
| 4 | "Episode 4" | Margherita Ferri | Story by : Massimo Vavassori, Antonio Dikele Distefano, Stefano Voltaggio, Lisandro Monaco & Carolina Cavalli; Teleplay by : Massimo Vavassori | 21 April 2021 |
| 5 | "Episode 5" | Margherita Ferri | Story by : Massimo Vavassori, Antonio Dikele Distefano, Stefano Voltaggio, Lisandro Monaco & Carolina Cavalli; Teleplay by : Carolina Cavalli | 21 April 2021 |
| 6 | "Episode 6" | Ivan Silvestrini | Story by : Massimo Vavassori, Antonio Dikele Distefano, Stefano Voltaggio, Lisandro Monaco & Carolina Cavalli; Teleplay by : Lisandro Monaco | 21 April 2021 |
| 7 | "Episode 7" | Ivan Silvestrini | Story by : Massimo Vavassori, Antonio Dikele Distefano, Stefano Voltaggio, Lisandro Monaco & Carolina Cavalli; Teleplay by : Stefano Voltaggio | 21 April 2021 |
| 8 | "Episode 8" | Ivan Silvestrini | Story by : Massimo Vavassori, Antonio Dikele Distefano, Stefano Voltaggio, Lisandro Monaco & Carolina Cavalli; Teleplay by : Stefano Voltaggio | 21 April 2021 |
