= Lorenzo Richelmy =

Italian actor

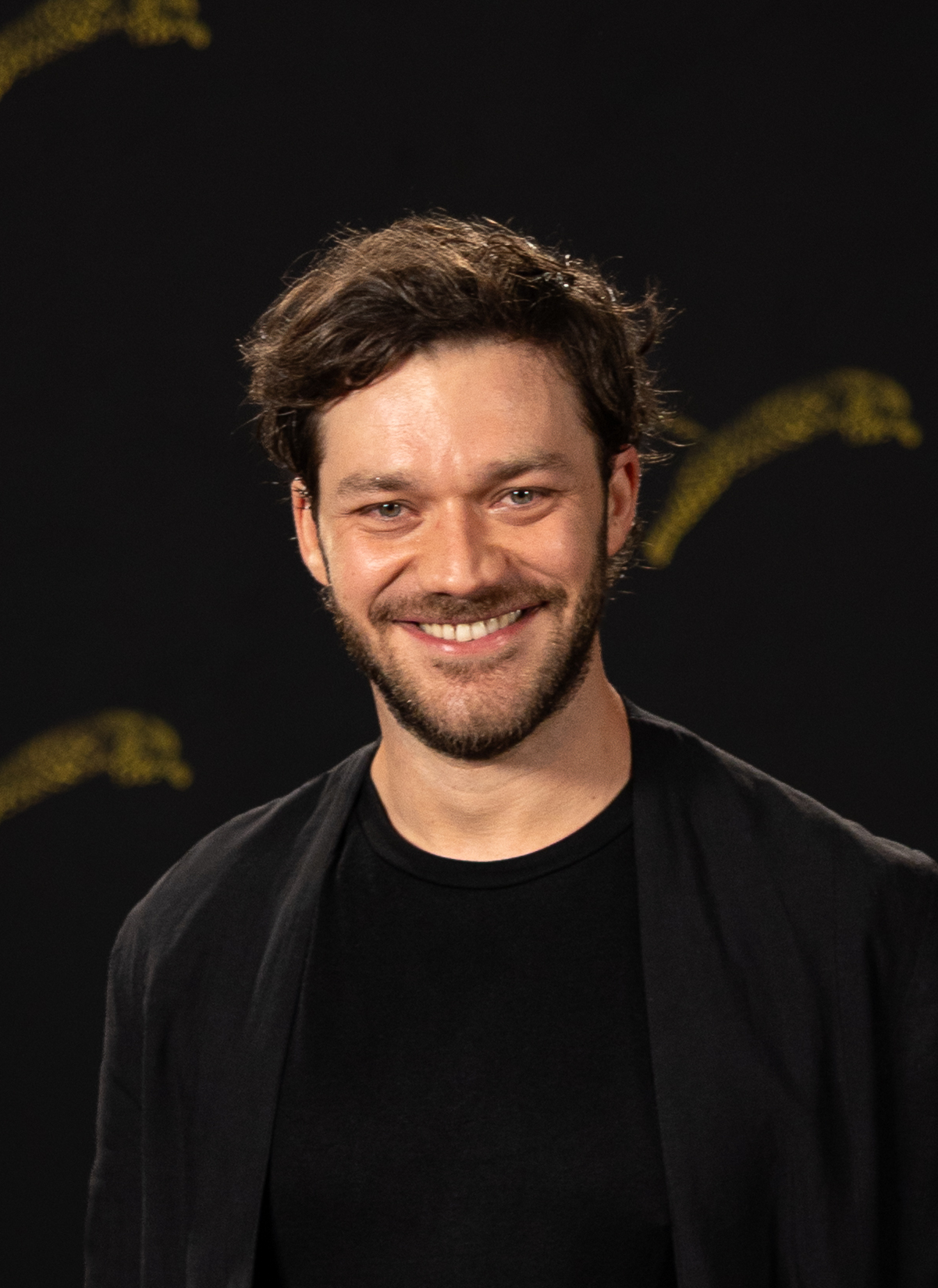
- Richelmy in 2026
- Born: 25 March 1990 (age 36); La Spezia, Liguria, Italy
- Occupation: Actor
- Known for: Marco Polo

Lorenzo Richelmy (born 25 March 1990) is an Italian actor, best known to audiences outside of Italy for his performance as the title character in the Netflix original series Marco Polo. Prior to being cast in the series, he appeared in several Italian television shows and films.

== Early life ==
Richelmy was born in La Spezia to parents Marco and Vivienne and moved to Rome with his family when he was four. He attended the liceo classico Giovanni Paolo II di Ostia Lido. Having begun his career as a child, Richelmy was the youngest actor ever accepted to the Centro Sperimentale di Cinematografia.

== Filmography ==
=== Film ===
Year	Title	Role	Notes	Ref.
2002	Il pranzo della domenica	Daniele		
2010	Fat Cat	Burro		
2012	100 metri dal paradiso	Tommaso		
2013	The Third Half	Samuel		
2013	La terra e il vento	Leonardo		
2014	Sotto una buona stella	Niccolò Picchioni		
2014	Hybris	Fabio		
2017	The Girl in the Fog	Agent Borghi		
2017	Rainbow: A Private Affair	Giorgio		
2018	Reckless	Roberto Rossi		
2018	Ride	Max Falco		
2019	Dolceroma	Andrea Serrano		
2020	Il talento del calabrone	DJ Steph		
2022	The Bunker Game	Gregorio		
2022	Jumping from High Places	Massimo Di Lorenzo		
2023	Eravamo bambini	Walter		
2024	Here Now	Komandante		
2027	The Resurrection of the Christ: Part One	King David	Post-production	

=== Television ===
Year	Title	Role	Notes
2008–2009	I liceali	Cesare Schifani	Main cast (season 1-2)
2012	Sposami	Danilo	Episode: "Episode 2"
2013	Borgia	Sidonius Grimani	Episode: "Transfiguration"
2013	Una Ferrari per due	Fabio Marchitelli	Television film
2014–2016	Marco Polo	Marco Polo	Lead role
2019	Sanctuary	Enzo	Main role
2022	Hotel Portofino	Roberto Aldani	Main role
2023	Fifteen-Love	Gianluca Barzagni	Main role
2024	Kidnapped: The Chloe Ayling Story	Francesco Pesce	Main role
