= The Ideal City =

- Film poster
- Directed by: Luigi Lo Cascio
- Screenplay by: Luigi Lo Cascio; Virginia Borgi; Massimo Gaudioso; Desideria Rayner
- Produced by: Angelo Barbagallo
- Starring: Luigi Lo Cascio; Catrinel Menghia; Luigi Maria Burruano
- Cinematography: Pasquale Mari
- Edited by: Desideria Rayner
- Music by: Andrea Rocca
- Production companies: BiBi Film; Rai Cinema
- Distributed by: Cinecittà Luce
- Release dates: August 11, 2012 (Venice); April 11, 2013 (Italy)
- Running time: 105 minutes
- Country: Italy
- Language: Italian

The Ideal City (Italian: La città ideale) is a 2012 Italian thriller drama film, written and directed by Luigi Lo Cascio. It is Cascio's directorial debut film. The film premiered in International Film Critics' Week section at 69th Venice International Film Festival on August 11, 2012.

The film screened at number of film festivals before having a theatrical release in Italy on April 11, 2013.

== Plot ==
The film tells the story of the architect and ecologist Michele Grassadonia, who moves from his hometown of Palermo to live in Siena and build a life that is as environmentally friendly as possible.

== Cast ==
- Luigi Lo Cascio as Michele Grassadonia
- Catrinel Menghia as Alexandra
- Luigi Maria Burruano as Avv. Scalici
- Aida Burruano as Madre
- Barbara Enrichi as Giudice
- Massimo Foschi as Avv. Chiantini
- Roberto Herlitzka as Custode Maneggio
- Alfonso Santagata as Pubblico Ministero
- Manuel Zicarelli as Marco

== Reception ==
The film received mixed to positive reviews from the critics. Boyd van Hoeij in his review for Variety said that "An ecologically minded Italo engineer finds himself in judicial quicksand after he pulls over his borrowed car to help someone lying in the road, in this intriguing, only lightly absurdist drama." Jennie Kermode of Eye for Film gave the film four out of five stars and called it "An intriguing piece of work and particularly impressive for a début feature, this won't be everybody's ideal film but some viewers will adore it." Mymovies.it said that "The ideal city remains an important debut and mature in the spread of so much ugliness takes the side of beauty."

== Accolades ==
Year	Group/Award	Category	Recipient	Result	Ref.
2012	Venice Film Festival	Best Italian Film	Luigi Lo Cascio	Won	
2013	Bimbi Belli Festival	Best Film	Luigi Lo Cascio	Nominated	
2013	David di Donatello Awards	Best New Director	Luigi Lo Cascio	Nominated	
2013	Italian National Syndicate of Film Journalists	Best New Director	Luigi Lo Cascio	Nominated	
2013	Roseto First Work Festival	Golden Rose	Luigi Lo Cascio	Won	
2014	World Premieres Film Festival	Best Environmental Feature	Luigi Lo Cascio	Nominated	
