= Pure Hearts =

2017 film

- Directed by: Roberto De Paolis
- Written by: Roberto De Paolis
- Starring: Selene Caramazza; Simone Liberati
- Release dates: 23 May 2017 (Cannes); 24 May 2017 (Italy)
- Running time: 115 minutes
- Country: Italy
- Language: Italian

Pure Hearts (Italian: Cuori Puri) is a 2017 Italian drama film written and directed by Roberto De Paolis. It was screened in the Directors' Fortnight section at the 2017 Cannes Film Festival.

== Cast ==
- Selene Caramazza as Agnese
- Simone Liberati as Stefano
- Barbora Bobulova as Marta
- Stefano Fresi as Don Luca
- Edoardo Pesce as Lele
- Antonella Attili as Angela
- Isabella Delle Monache as Beatrice
