= Giulia Maenza =

Italian actress and model

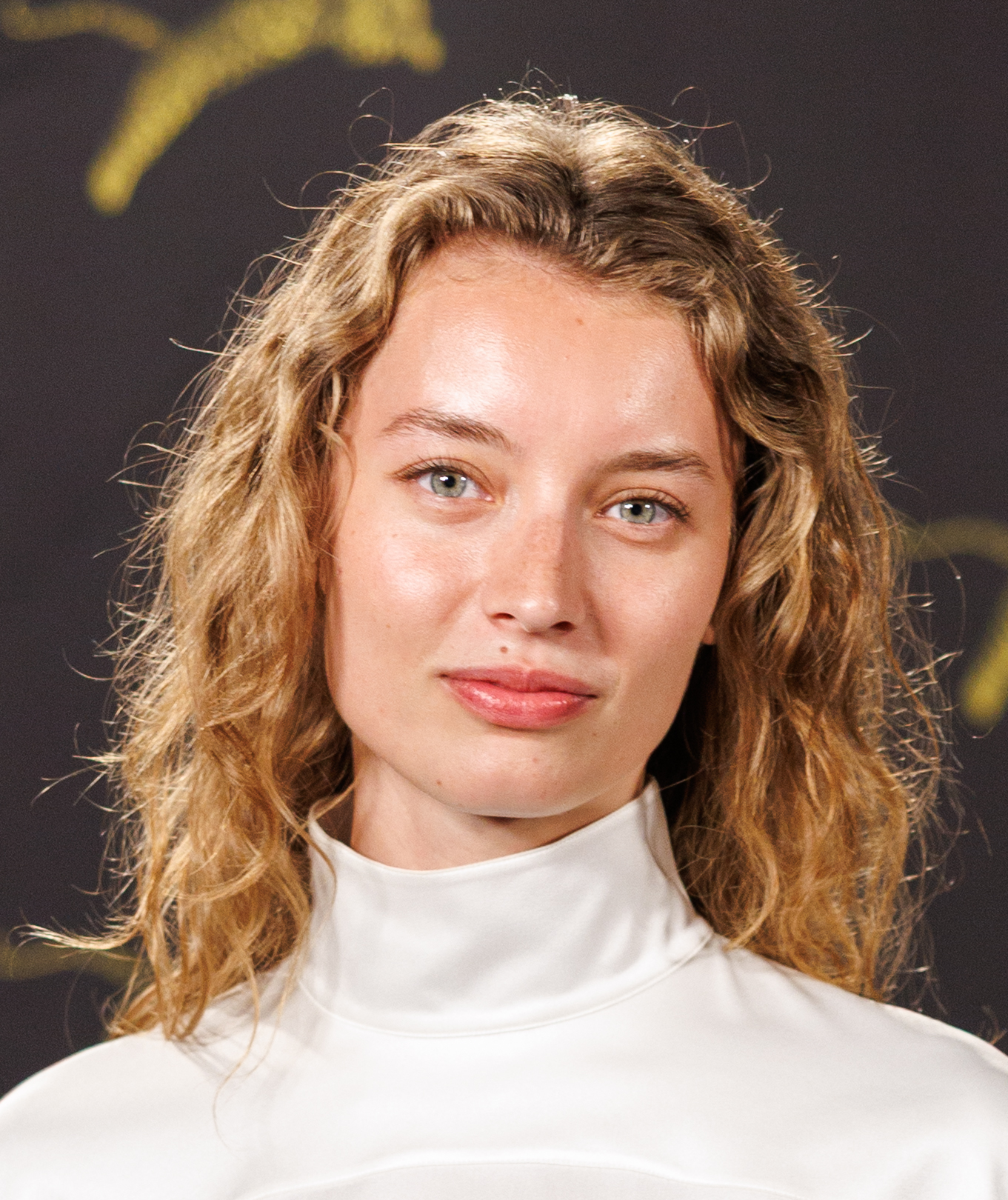
- Maenza in 2026
- Born: 15 December 1999 (age 26); Camporeale, Palermo, Sicily
- Occupations: Actress, model
- Years active: 2016-present
- Modeling information
- Height: 1.80 m (5 ft 11 in)
- Hair color: Blonde
- Eye color: Blue
- Agency: DNA Models (New York); VIVA Model Management (Paris, London, Barcelona); Why Not Model Management (Milan)

Giulia Maenza (born 15 December 1999) is an Italian fashion model and actress.

== Early life ==
Maenza was born in Sicily, to Nicola, a physical education teacher, and Concetta, an accountant. She has two older brothers, Davide and Marco.

== Career ==
Maenza was discovered at a stadium by a former model. She debuted as a semi-exclusive for Versace, also walking for Dolce & Gabbana (who would become a frequent collaborator), Ermanno Scervino, Moschino, DSquared2, Giambattista Valli, Elie Saab, Armani Privé, Christopher Kane, Max Mara, Blumarine, Miu Miu, Azzedine Alaïa, and Oscar de la Renta. She has appeared in advertisements for Bvlgari, Chopard, shoemaker René Caovilla, Topshop, Dolce & Gabbana, and Express. Editorially, she has appeared in Vogue Italia, Vogue Spain, Vogue Paris, Marie Claire, Vogue Japan, Vanity Fair France, and Vogue Germany.

== Filmography ==
Film
Year	Title	Role	Notes
2022	The Invisible Thread	Anna Del Monte	
2024	U.S. Palmese	Concetta	
2025	A Brief Affair	Actress on TV series	

Television
Year	Title	Role	Notes
2016	The Mafia Kills Only in Summer	Simonetta	TV series; 3 episodes
2022–2024	The Bad Guy	Teresa Suro	TV series; 11 episodes
