= Romeo Is Juliet =

2024 comedy film

- Directed by: Giovanni Veronesi
- Screenplay by: Giovanni Veronesi; Pilar Fogliati; Nicola Baldoni
- Story by: Giovanni Veronesi; Pietro Valsecchi
- Starring: Sergio Castellitto; Pilar Fogliati; Margherita Buy; Geppi Cucciari; Maurizio Lombardi; Serena de Ferrari; Domenico Diele; Alessandro Haber
- Cinematography: Giovanni Canevari
- Edited by: Patrizio Marone
- Music by: Andrea Guerra
- Distributed by: Vision Distribution
- Release date: 2024
- Country: Italy
- Language: Italian

Romeo Is Juliet (Italian: Romeo è Giulietta) is a 2024 Italian romantic comedy film co-written and directed by Giovanni Veronesi, and starring Sergio Castellitto and Pilar Fogliati.

== Cast ==
- Sergio Castellitto as Federico Landi Porrini
- Pilar Fogliati as Vittoria / Otto Novembre
- Geppi Cucciari as Gloria
- Maurizio Lombardi as Lorenzo
- Serena de Ferrari as Gemma
- Domenico Diele as Rocco
- Margherita Buy as Clara
- Alessandro Haber as Giovanni Festa
- Asia Argento as herself

== Release ==
The film was released on Italian cinemas on 14 February 2024 by Vision Distribution.

== Reception ==
The film won the 2024 Globo d'oro for best comedy film. For their performances, Pilar Fogliati and Maurizio Lombardi won Silver Ribbons for best comedy actress and best comedy actor.
