= Jacopo Rampini =

Italian actor and writer (born 1986)

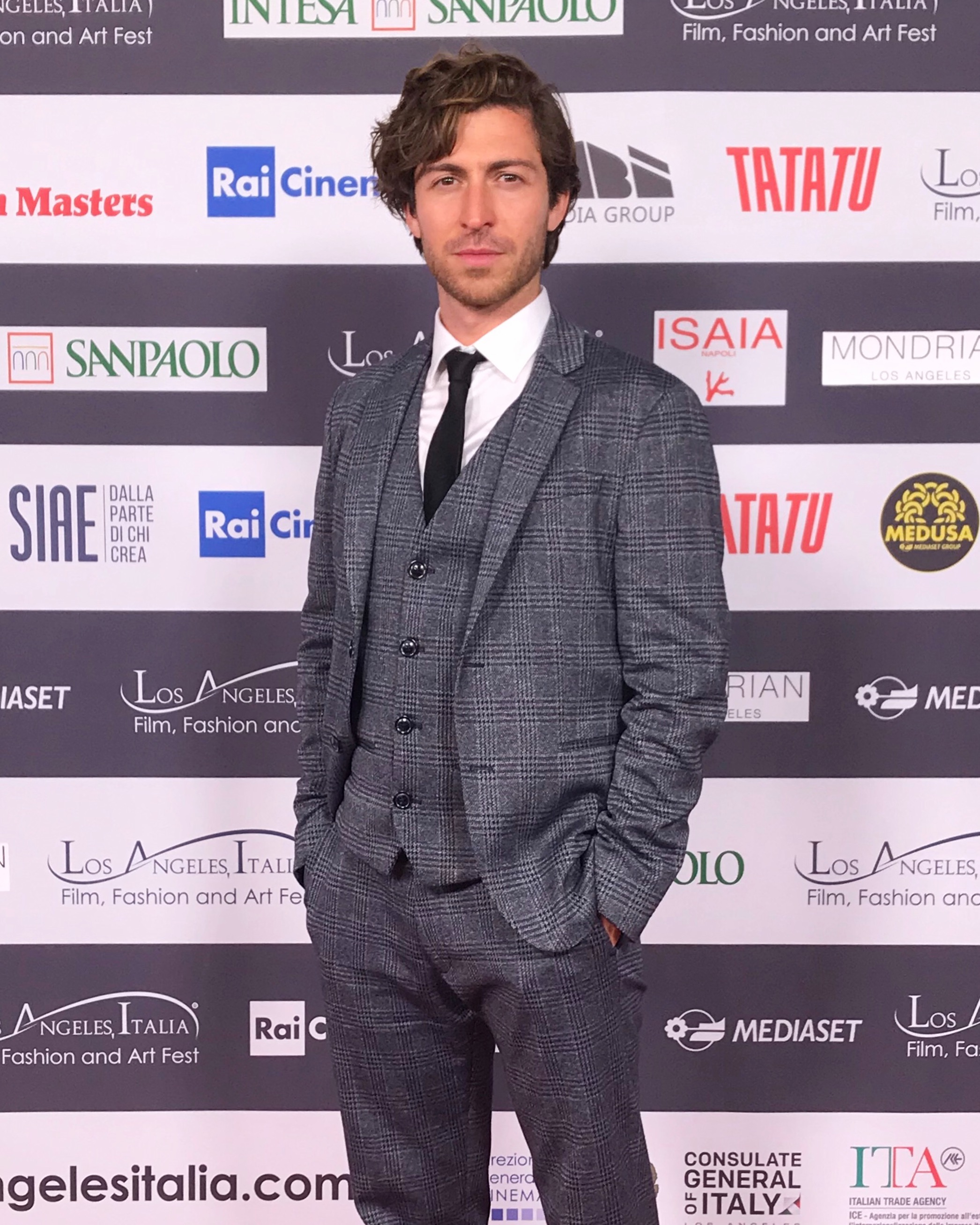
- Born: 17 August 1986 (age 40); Rome, Lazio, Italy
- Occupations: Actor, writer

Jacopo Rampini (born 17 August 1986) is an Italian and American actor and writer. He works in theatre, film and television in the United States and in Italy.

== Life and career ==
Born in Rome, Italy, Rampini grew up in San Francisco and in Paris, where he graduated in literature and philosophy from the Sorbonne University. He studied acting at the American Academy of Dramatic Arts in New York. Rampini is fluent in French, Italian, and English, and holds dual citizenship in Italy and the United States.

Rampini made his professional stage debut in Sam Gold's production of A Doll's House at the Williamstown Theatre Festival in 2011. Since then, he has appeared in numerous films and TV series across both the United States and Europe, including The World Wars, Law & Order: Special Victims Unit, FBI, Halston, That Dirty Black Bag, The Blacklist, and Survival of the Thickest. In 2023, Rampini played the lead role in the Italian feature film Shakespeare King of Naples which was presented at the Rome Film Fest.

In 2025, Rampini co-authored the novel Il gioco del potere with his father, journalist and writer Federico Rampini. The book, published by Mondadori, explores themes of geopolitical conflict, artificial intelligence, and family legacy.

== Filmography ==
=== Television ===
Year	Title	Role	Notes
2014	'The World Wars'	Young Stalin	3 Episodes
2014	Scorned: Love Kills	Brian Folsom	Episode: "Lover's Roulette”
2016	Medici: Masters of Florence	First Follower	Episode: "Judgment Day"
2016	Brown Nation	French Guy	Episode: "Dhansukh Dilemma"
2018	Law & Order: Special Victims Unit	Waiter	Episode: "Mea Culpa"
2019	Catch-22	New co-pilot	1 Episodes
2019	FBI	Nick	Episode: "The Lives of Others"
2021	Halston	French PA	Episode: "Versailles"
2022	That Dirty Black Bag	Jona	3 Episodes
2023	The Blacklist	Patron	Episode: "Dr. Michael Abani"
2024	Power Book II: Ghost	Maitre D’	Episode: "Higher Calling"
2025	Survival of the Thickest	Tommaso	Episode: "When in Rome"

=== Film ===
Year	Title	Role	Notes
2016	Love is Strange	Partygoer	Feature Film
2019	Being Leonardo da Vinci	Jack	Feature Film
2019	The Many Saints of Newark	Neopolitan man	Feature Film
2023	Romantic Girls	Ranieri	Feature film
2023	Shakespea Re di Napoli	William Shakespeare	Feature Film
2024	The Thief of Falling Stars	Milo	Feature Film
2024	Race for Glory: Audi vs. Lancia	Announcer	Feature Film

== Publications ==
- Il gioco del potere (with Federico Rampini), Mondadori, 2025. ISBN 9788804787270.
