= Federico Rampini =

Italian journalist and writer (born 1956)

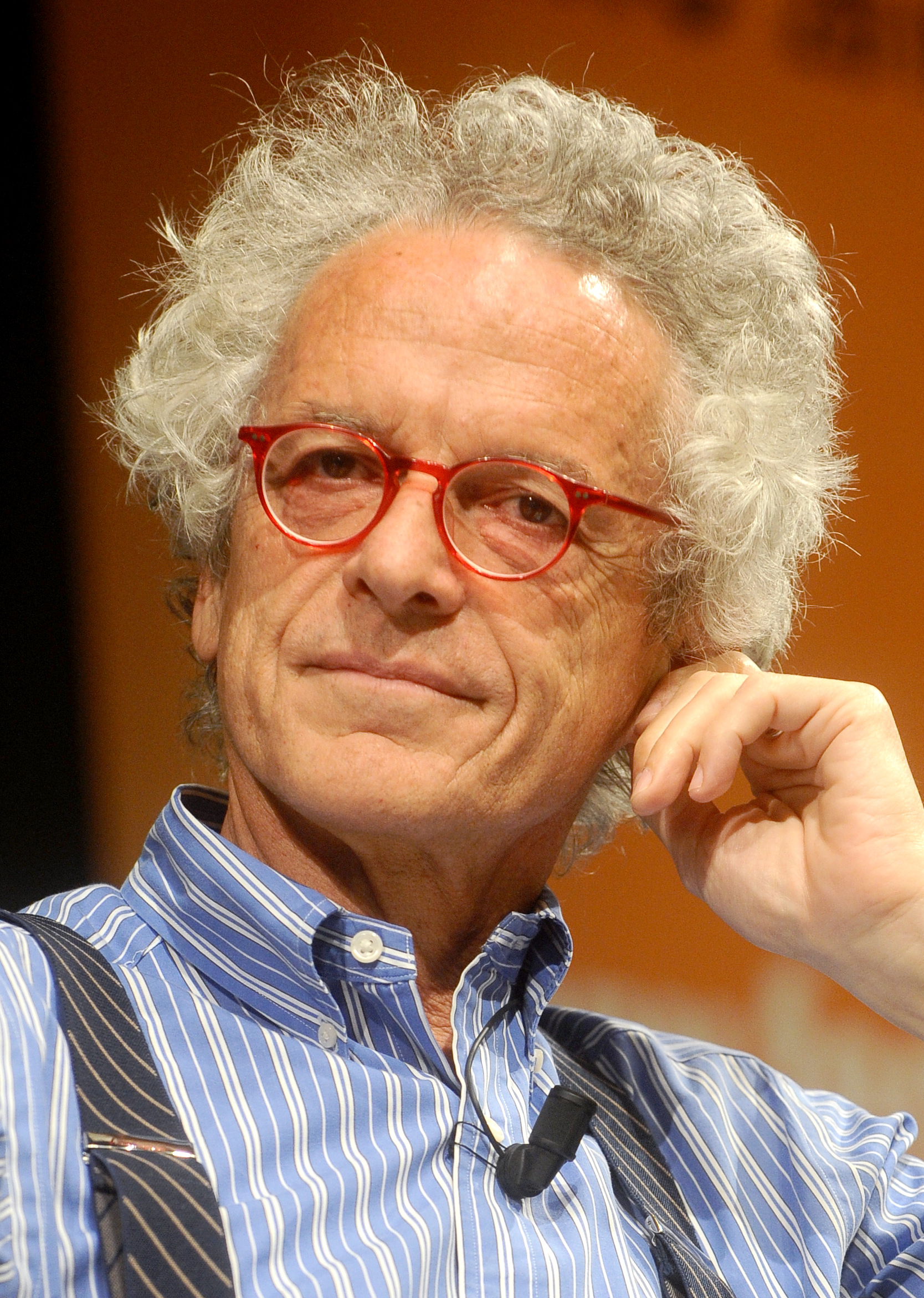
- Born: 25 March 1956 (age 69); Genoa, Italy
- Occupations: Journalist, writer, lecturer
- Height: 1.69 m (5 ft 7 in)

Federico Rampini (born 25 March 1956) is an Italian journalist, writer, and lecturer who holds both Italian and American citizenship. He served as deputy editor of Il Sole 24 Ore, and has worked as chief foreign correspondent for La Repubblica since 1997. He has been residing in the United States since 2000. He is the 2019 recipient of the Ernest Hemingway Prize.

== Early life, education, and family ==
Rampini was born in Genoa, Italy, on 25 March 1956, and was raised in Brussels due to his father's work at the European Commission. He attended the European School, Brussels I, where he earned a European Baccalaureate. He then attended Bocconi University in Milan, where he spent four years studying political economy, without graduating. Subsequently, he attended the Sapienza University of Rome, where he passed some exams, again without graduating. He would also attend seminars of the French liberal sociologist Raymond Aron at the École pratique des hautes études in Paris. He was a member of the Italian Communist Party from 1974 to 1984.

Rampini is married to Stefania, with whom he has two children, actor Jacopo Rampini and Costanza Rampini, a university professor. He has lived in the United States since 2000, and became a US citizen in 2014.

== Career ==
Rampini's activity as a journalist began in 1977 for Città futura, a weekly magazine of the Italian Communist Youth Federation (FGCI) whose secretary at the time was Massimo D’Alema. From 1979 to 1982 he worked as the economic-union editor for the PCI weekly Rinascita. In 1982 Rampini moved to Mondo Economico (weekly of Il Sole 24 Ore), then to L'Espresso (1982–1986). Rampini worked for Il Sole 24 Ore as correspondent from France for five years (1986–1991) and later as deputy director (1991–1995). Since 1995 he has been working for La Repubblica, first as head of the Milanese editorial staff, then as foreign correspondent from Brussels (1997–2000), San Francisco (2000–2004), Beijing (2004–2009), and since 2009 from New York City. Rampini often reports on top-level international summits such as the G-8, G-20, and the World Economic Forum in Davos; he also reports from the White House as he holds press accreditation from the Presidency of the United States of America.

Rampini, who is a prolific non-fiction writer and essayist, has written over 30 books, most of which are published by Mondadori and have been translated into several languages. In 2005, his book Il Secolo Cinese ("The Chinese Century", topped the Italian bestseller charts in non-fiction for several months and is now in its sixteenth edition. His 2006 book L'Impero di Cindia ("The Chindia Empire: China, India and Their Surroundings") (Mondadori), sold over 100,000 copies.

Rampini was named among the fifty most influential personalities in Europe in 2005 by the European Voice poll EV50. He has been a visiting professor at the University of California Berkeley School of Journalism, Bocconi University in Milan, and at the Shanghai University of Economics and Finance.

Rampini was accused in early 2015, among others by translator Marion Sarah Tuggey, of having based one of his articles on translations and reductions of articles and reports from newspapers such as the New York Times and the Financial Times. Among these, an interview with Vandana Shiva, which would have been produced through partial translation and readjustment of a blog post on Shiva's website. To illustrate such cases of plagiarism, Tuggey and others used the hashtag #rampinomics.

== Awards ==
- Premio Acqui Storia, 2005
- Premio Luigi Barzini, 2005
- Premio Saint Vincent, 2006
- Premio Hemingway (2019)

== Books ==
- La comunicazione aziendale. All'interno dell'impresa, nel contesto sociale, nel quadro europeo, Milano, ETAS libri, 1990, ISBN 88-453-0404-3
- Il crack delle nostre pensioni, Milano, Rizzoli, 1994, ISBN 88-17-84362-8.
- Imprenditori italiani nel mondo. Ieri e oggi, con Duccio Bigazzi (a cura di), Milano, Libri Scheiwiller, 1996, ISBN 88-7644-241-3.
- Germanizzazione. Come cambierà l'Italia, Roma, Laterza, 1996, ISBN 88-420-4909-3.
- Kosovo. Gli italiani e la guerra, intervista a Massimo D'Alema, Milano, Mondadori, 1999, ISBN 88-04-47302-9.
- Per adesso. Intervista con Carlo De Benedetti, Milano, Longanesi, 1999, ISBN 88-304-1473-5.
- New economy. Una rivoluzione in corso, Roma, Laterza, 2000, ISBN 88-420-6110-7.
- Dall'euforia al crollo. La seconda vita della new economy, Roma, Laterza, 2001, ISBN 88-420-6821-7.
- Effetto euro, Milano, Longanesi, 2002, ISBN 88-304-1934-6.
- Le paure dell'America, Collana I Robinson.Letture, Milano, Longanesi, 2003, ISBN 88-420-7167-6.
- San Francisco-Milano, Collana Contromano, Roma, Laterza, Laterza 2004, ISBN 88-420-7441-1.
- Tutti gli uomini del presidente. George W. Bush e la nuova destra americana, Collana Le sfere, Roma, Carocci, 2004, ISBN 88-430-3013-2.
- Il secolo cinese. Storie di uomini, città e denaro dalla fabbrica del mondo, Milano, Mondadori, 2005, ISBN 88-04-54482-1.
- L'impero di Cindia. Cina, India e dintorni: la superpotenza asiatica da tre miliardi e mezzo di persone, Collana Strade blu, Milano, Mondadori, 2006, ISBN 88-04-55130-5.
- L'ombra di Mao. Sulle tracce del grande timoniere per capire il presente di Cina, Tibet, Corea del Nord e il futuro del mondo, Milano, Mondadori, 2006, ISBN 88-04-56048-7.
- La speranza indiana. Storie di uomini, città e denaro dalla più grande democrazia del mondo, Collana Strade blu, Milano, Mondadori 2007, ISBN 88-04-57298-1.
- Centomila punture di spillo. Come l'Italia può tornare a correre, con Carlo De Benedetti e Francesco Daveri, Collana Strade blu, Milano, Mondadori 2008, ISBN 88-04-58366-5.
- Con gli occhi dell'Oriente, Milano, A. Mondadori scuola, 2009.
- Le dieci cose che non-saranno più le stesse. Tutto quello che la crisi sta cambiando, Roma, Gruppo editoriale L'Espresso, 2009.
- Slow Economy. Rinascere con saggezza. Tutto quello che noi occidentali possiamo imparare dall'Oriente, Collana Strade blu, Milano, Mondadori 2009. ISBN 978-88-04-59368-3.
- Occidente estremo. Il nostro futuro tra l'ascesa dell'impero cinese e il declino della potenza americana, Collana Strade blu, Milano, Mondadori 2010. ISBN 978-88-04-60333-7
- San Francisco-Milano. Un italiano nell'altra America (Collana I Robinson.Letture ed.). Roma-Bari: Laterza. 2011. ISBN 978-88-420-9517-0.
- Alla mia sinistra. Lettera aperta a tutti quelli che vogliono sognare insieme a me (Collana Strade blu ed.). Milano: Mondadori. 2011. ISBN 978-88-04-61372-5.
- "Non ci possiamo più permettere uno Stato sociale". Falso! (Collana Idòla ed.). Roma-Bari: Laterza. 2012. ISBN 978-88-420-9502-6.
- Voi avete gli orologi, noi abbiamo il tempo. Manifesto generazionale per non rinunciare al futuro (Collana Strade blu ed.). Milano: Mondadori. 2012. ISBN 978-88-04-62518-6.
- Banchieri. Storie dal nuovo banditismo globale (Collana Strade blu ed.). Milano: Mondadori. 2013. ISBN 978-88-04-63350-1.
- Giorgio Napolitano (2013). La via maestra. L'Europa e il ruolo dell'Italia nel mondo. Conversazione con Federico Rampini (Collana Ingrandimenti ed.). Milano: Mondadori. ISBN 978-88-046-3247-4.
- Vi racconto il nostro futuro. Con DVD. Occidente estremo, lo spettacolo teatrale. Libro + DVD (Collana Strade blu ed.). Milano: Mondadori. 2014. ISBN 978-88-046-3863-6.
- La trappola dell'austerity. Perché l'ideologia del rigore blocca la ripresa. Roma-Bari: Laterza. 2014. ISBN 978-88-581-1163-5.
- Rete padrona. Amazon. Apple, Google & co. Il volto oscuro della rivoluzione digitale. Milano: Feltrinelli. 2014. ISBN 978-88-07-07036-5.
- All you need is love. L'economia spiegata con le canzoni dei Beatles (Collana Strade blu ed.). Milano: Mondadori. 2014. ISBN 978-88-04-64590-0.
- L'età del caos. Viaggio nel grande disordine mondiale (Collana Strade blu ed.). Milano: Mondadori. 2015. ISBN 978-88-04-65807-8.
- Banche: possiamo ancora fidarci? (Collana Strade blu ed.). Milano: Mondadori. 2016. ISBN 978-88-04-66140-5.
- Il tradimento. Globalizzazione e immigrazione, le menzogne delle élite (Collana Strade blu ed.). Milano: Mondadori. 2016. ISBN 978-88-04-67241-8.
- Le linee rosse. Uomini, Confini, Imperi: le carte geografiche che raccontano il mondo in cui viviamo (Collana Strade blu ed.). Milano: Mondadori. 2017. ISBN 978-88-04-68358-2.
- Quando inizia la nostra storia. Le grandi svolte del passato che hanno disegnato il mondo in cui viviamo (Collana Strade blu ed.). Milano: Mondadori. 2018. ISBN 978-88-04-70529-1.
- La notte della sinistra. Da dove ripartire (Collana Strade blu ed.). Milano: Mondadori. 2019. ISBN 978-88-04-71340-1.
- L'oceano di mezzo. Un viaggio lungo 24.539 km (Collana I Robinson ed.). Roma-Bari: Laterza. 2019. ISBN 978-88-581-3687-4.
- La seconda guerra fredda. Lo scontro per il nuovo dominio globale (Collana Strade blu ed.). Milano: Mondadori. 2019. ISBN 978-88-047-1873-4.
- Suicidio occidentale. Perché è sbagliato processare la nostra storia e cancellare i nostri valori (Collana Strade blu. Non fiction ed.). Milano: Mondadori. 2022. ISBN 978-88-047-3832-9.
- America. Viaggio alla riscoperta di un Paese, Collana Saggi, Milano, Solferino, 2022, ISBN 978-88-282-0909-6.
- Il lungo inverno. False apocalissi, vere crisi ma non ci salverà lo Stato, Collana Strade blu, Milano, Mondadori, 2022, ISBN 978-88-047-5522-7.
- La speranza africana. La terra del futuro concupita, incompresa, sorprendente, Collana Strade blu, Milano, Mondadori, 2023, ISBN 978-88-047-7644-4.
- Il nuovo impero arabo. Come cambia il Medio Oriente e quale ruolo avrà nel nostro futuro, Collana Saggi, Milano, Solferino, 2024, ISBN 978-88-282-1448-9.
- Grazie, Occidente! Tutto il bene che abbiamo fatto, Collana Strade blu. Non fiction, Milano, Mondadori, 2024, ISBN 978-88-047-7645-1.
