= List of Italian films of 1997 =

A list of films produced in Italy in 1997 (see 1997 in film):

Title	Director	Cast	Genre	Notes
1997
Le acrobate	Maurizio Zaccaro	Licia Maglietta, Valeria Golino, Fabrizio Bentivoglio	drama	
Artemisia	Agnès Merlet	Valentina Cervi, Michel Serrault	biographical	
A spasso nel tempo – L'avventura continua	Carlo Vanzina	Massimo Boldi, Christian De Sica, Marco Messeri	Comedy	
Auguri professore	Riccardo Milani	Silvio Orlando, Claudia Pandolfi	Comedy	
Banzai	Carlo Vanzina	Paolo Villaggio	comedy	
Un bel dì vedremo	Tonino Valerii	Raina Kabaivanska, Giuliano Gemma, Massimo Girotti	drama	
Camere da letto	Simona Izzo	Diego Abatantuono, Maria Grazia Cucinotta, Ricky Tognazzi	romantic comedy	
Come mi vuoi	Carmine Amoroso	Enrico Lo Verso, Vincent Cassel, Monica Bellucci	Comedy-drama	
Consigli per gli acquisti	Sandro Baldoni	Ennio Fantastichini, Ivano Marescotti	Comedy	
Cyberflic	Antonio Margheriti	Terence Hill, Marvelous Marvin Hagler	crime-comedy	
Fuochi d'artificio	Leonardo Pieraccioni	Leonardo Pieraccioni, Massimo Ceccherini	Comedy	
The Game Bag (Il carniere)	Maurizio Zaccaro	Massimo Ghini, Antonio Catania, Leo Gullotta	war-drama	
The Good Bad Guy	Ezio Greggio	Ezio Greggio, Jessica Lundy, Dom DeLuise	Comedy	
Hamam (Il bagno turco)	Ferzan Özpetek	Alessandro Gassmann, Carlo Cecchi	Drama	
In barca a vela contromano	Stefano Reali	Valerio Mastandrea, Antonio Catania	Comedy	
Gli inaffidabili	Jerry Calà	Jerry Calà, Leo Gullotta, Serena Grandi	Comedy	
Life Is Beautiful (La vita è bella)	Roberto Benigni	Roberto Benigni, Nicoletta Braschi, Giustino Durano, Marisa Paredes	Comedy, Holocaust	3 Academy Award winner. Cannes Award. European Film Awards. David di Donatello winner
The Mayor (Il sindaco)	Ugo Fabrizio Giordani	Anthony Quinn, Raoul Bova, Maria Grazia Cucinotta	Comedy-drama	
Le mani forti	Franco Bernini	Claudio Amendola, Francesca Neri	drama	
Marcello Mastroianni: I Remember	Anna Maria Tatò	Marcello Mastroianni	documentary	Screened at the 1997 Cannes Film Festival
Marianna Ucrìa	Roberto Faenza	Bernard Giraudeau, Laura Morante, Philippe Noiret	drama	Entered into the 20th Moscow International Film Festival
Once We Were Strangers	Emanuele Crialese	Jessica Whitney Gould	Romance-comedy	
Nirvana	Gabriele Salvatores	Christopher Lambert, Diego Abatantuono, Stefania Rocca	science fiction	
Ovosodo	Paolo Virzì	Edoardo Gabbriellini, Nicoletta Braschi	Comedy, Drama	2 David di Donatello, 4 Venice Film Festival Awards
Porzûs	Renzo Martinelli	Lorenzo Crespi, Gianni Cavina, Gastone Moschin	war drama	
The Prince of Homburg	Marco Bellocchio	Andrea Di Stefano, Barbora Bobuľová	drama	Entered into the 1997 Cannes Film Festival
Stressati	Mauro Cappelloni	Monica Bellucci	Comedy	
Tano da morire	Roberta Torre	Mimma de Rosalia	Musical Comedy	
Testimone a rischio	Pasquale Pozzessere	Fabrizio Bentivoglio, Claudio Amendola	Crime	
Il testimone dello sposo	Pupi Avati	Diego Abatantuono, Inés Sastre	Comedy-drama	
Totò che visse due volte	Daniele Ciprì, Franco Maresco	Salvatore Gattuso	comedy	Film with 3 episodes
Tre uomini e una gamba	Aldo, Giovanni & Giacomo	Aldo, Giovanni & Giacomo	Comedy	
The Truce	Francesco Rosi	John Turturro, Rade Šerbedžija, Massimo Ghini, Stefano Dionisi	war drama	Entered into the 1997 Cannes Film Festival
Tutti giù per terra	Davide Ferrario	Valerio Mastandrea, Caterina Caselli	Comedy	
Uomo d'acqua dolce	Antonio Albanese	Antonio Albanese	Comedy	
Una vacanza all'inferno	Tonino Valerii	Marco Leonardi, F. Murray Abraham, Giancarlo Giannini	drama	
I vesuviani	Antonio Capuano, Pappi Corsicato, Antonietta de Lillo, Stefano Incerti, Mario Martone	Anna Bonaiuto, Iaia Forte, Toni Servillo, Renato Carpentieri	Comedy-Drama	
Il viaggio della sposa	Sergio Rubini	Sergio Rubini, Giovanna Mezzogiorno	comedy	
Wax Mask	Sergio Stivaletti	Robert Hossein, Romina Mondello	horror	
