= Nastro d'Argento for Best New Director =

Italian film award

The Nastro d'Argento (Silver Ribbon) is a film award assigned each year, since 1946, by Sindacato Nazionale dei Giornalisti Cinematografici Italiani ("Italian National Syndicate of Film Journalists"), the association of Italian film critics.

Thi is the list of the Nastro d'Argento Awards for the Best New Director, assigned since 1974. Four of the winners of this award have subsequently also received the Nastro d'Argento Award for the Best Director: Maurizio Nichetti, Giuseppe Tornatore, Paolo Virzì, and Paolo Sorrentino.

== 1970s ==
- 1974 - Marco Leto - Black Holiday
- 1975 - Luigi Di Gianni - Il tempo dell'inizio
- 1976 - Ennio Lorenzini - Quanto è bello lu murire acciso
- 1977 - Giorgio Ferrara - A Simple Heart
- 1978 - Sergio Nuti - Non contate su di noi
- 1979 - Salvatore Nocita - Ligabue

== 1980s ==
- 1980 - Maurizio Nichetti - Ratataplan
- 1981 - Massimo Troisi - I'm Starting from Three
- 1982 - Alessandro Benvenuti - West of Paperino
- 1983 - Franco Piavoli - Blue Planet
- 1984 - Gabriele Lavia - Il principe di Homburg
- 1985 - Luciano De Crescenzo - Così parlò Bellavista
- 1986 - Enrico Montesano - A me mi piace
- 1987 - Giuseppe Tornatore - The Professor
- 1988 - Carlo Mazzacurati - Italian Night
- 1989 - Francesca Archibugi - Mignon Has Come to Stay

== 1990s ==
- 1990 - Ricky Tognazzi - Little Misunderstandings
- 1991 - Sergio Rubini - The Station
- 1992 - Antonio Capuano - Vito and the Others
- 1993 - Mario Martone - Death of a Neapolitan Mathematician
- 1994 - Pappi Corsicato - Libera
- 1995 - Paolo Virzì - Living It Up
- 1996 - Sandro Baldoni - Weird Tales
- 1997 - Roberto Cimpanelli - A Cold, Cold Winter
- 1998 - Roberta Torre - To Die for Tano
- 1999 - Luciano Ligabue - Radiofreccia

== 2000s ==
- 2000 - Alessandro Piva - Lacapagira
- 2001 - Alex Infascelli - Almost Blue
- 2002 - Paolo Sorrentino - One Man Up
- 2003 - Maria Sole Tognazzi - Past Perfect
- 2004 - Franco Battiato - Perdutoamor
- 2005 - Saverio Costanzo - Private
- 2006 - Francesco Munzi - Saimir
- 2007 - Kim Rossi Stuart - Along the Ridge
- 2008 - Andrea Molaioli - The Girl by the Lake
- 2009 - Gianni Di Gregorio - Mid-August Lunch

== 2010s ==
- 2010
  - Valerio Mieli - Ten Winters
  - Rocco Papaleo - Basilicata Coast to Coast
- 2011 - Alice Rohrwacher - Heavenly Body
- 2012 - Francesco Bruni - Easy!
- 2013 - Valeria Golino - Miele
- 2014 - Pierfrancesco Diliberto - The Mafia Kills Only in the Summer
- 2015 - Edoardo Falcone - God Willing
- 2016 - Gabriele Mainetti - They Call Me Jeeg
- 2017 - Andrea De Sica - Children of the Night
- 2018 - Damiano and Fabio D'Innocenzo - Boys Cry
- 2019
  - Leonardo D'Agostini - The Champion
  - Valerio Mastandrea - Ride

== 2020s ==
- 2020 - Marco D'Amore - The Immortal
- 2021 – Pietro Castellitto – The Predators
- 2022 – Giulia Steigerwalt – September
- 2023: Giuseppe Fiorello - Fireworks
- 2024: Michele Riondino - Palazzina Laf
- 2025: Greta Scarano - Siblings

== See also ==
- David di Donatello for Best New Director
- Cinema of Italy
