= Gigio Morra =

Italian actor (1945–2024)

- Born: Luigi Morra; 26 August 1945; Naples, Italy
- Died: 10 March 2024 (aged 78); Naples, Italy

Luigi "Gigio" Morra (26 August 1945 – 10 March 2024) was an Italian actor whose career spanned over 50 years.

== Life and career ==
Born in Naples, Morra studied at the Accademia d’arte drammatica di Napoli, graduating in 1966. He started his career on stage with Carlo Cecchi, who gave him the nickname Gigio, after then popular puppet Topo Gigio.

Morra was mainly active on theatre, where among others he worked in the stage companies of Eduardo De Filippo, Giuseppe Patroni Griffi, Maurizio Scaparro, Luca De Filippo, and Toni Servillo. He made his film debut in 1976, in Marco Bellocchio's Victory March, and worked with Lina Wertmüller, Matteo Garrone, Nanni Moretti, Mario Martone, Marco Risi, Gianni Di Gregorio, Antonio Capuano, Edoardo Leo, and Riccardo Milani, among others. On television, he is best known for the role of Peppino Canfora he played between 2017 and 2019 in the Rai 3 TV-series Un posto al sole.

Morra died on 10 March 2024, at the age of 78.

== Selected filmography ==
- Victory March (1976)
- Sweet Dreams (1981)
- Ciao, Professore! (1992)
- The Dust of Naples (1998)
- Gomorrah (2008)
- Bets and Wedding Dresses (2009)
- Fort Apache Napoli (2009)
- Women vs. Men (2011)
- Dormant Beauty (2012)
- Welcome Mr. President (2013)
- Best Enemies Forever (2016)
- Pericle (2016)
- Omicidio all'italiana (2017)
- 5 Is the Perfect Number (2019)
- Pinocchio (2019)
- The King of Laughter (2021)
- Breaking Up in Rome (2021)
- Never Too Late for Love (2022)
- A Brighter Tomorrow (2023)
