= 54th Venice International Film Festival =

Italian film festival in 1997

- Festival poster
- Opening film: Deconstructing Harry
- Closing film: Richard III
- Location: Venice, Italy
- Founded: 1932
- Awards: Golden Lion: Hana-bi
- Artistic director: Felice Laudadio
- Festival date: 27 August – 6 September 1997
- Website: Website

Venice Film Festival chronology
- 55th 53rd

The 54th annual Venice International Film Festival was held between 27 August to 6 September 1997.

New Zealand filmmaker Jane Campion was the Jury President of the Main Competition. The opening film was Woody Allen's Deconstructing Harry, while the closing film was a restored version of 1912 silent film Richard III, accompanied live by Vittorio Gassman serving as narrator and Ennio Morricone conducing the Arturo Toscanini Orchestra. Takeshi Kitano's Hana-bi was the Golden Lion winner.

== Juries ==
The following people comprised the 1997 jury:

=== Main competition ===
- Jane Campion, New Zealand filmmaker and producer - Jury President
- Ronald Bass, American writer and producer
- Véra Belmont, French producer
- Peter Buchka, German critic
- Nana Jorjadze, Georgian filmmaker and actress
- Idrissa Ouedraogo, Burkinabé filmmaker
- Charlotte Rampling, British actress
- Shinya Tsukamoto, Japanese filmmaker, producer and actor
- Francesco Rosi, Italian director

=== Short films competition ===
- Marco Bellocchio, Italian filmmaker - Jury President
- Olivier Assayas, French filmmaker and film critic
- Clare Peploe, British producer and screenwriter

== Official sections ==
The following films were selected to be screened:

=== In competition ===
English title	Original title	Director(s)	Production country
Blinded	A ciegas	Daniel Calparsoro	Spain
Chinese Box		Wayne Wang	United States
Dry Cleaning	Nettoyage à sec	Anne Fontaine	France
Hana-bi		Takeshi Kitano	Japan
Hardboiled Egg	Ovosodo	Paolo Virzì	Italy
The Informant		Jim McBride	United States, Ireland
Keep Cool	有話好好說	Yimou Zhang	China
Love Stories	Historie milosne	Jerzy Stuhr	Poland
Niagara, Niagara		Bob Gosse	United States, Canada
One Night Stand		Mike Figgis	United States
Ossos		Pedro Costa	Portugal, France, Denmark
The Oyster and the Wind	A Ostra e o Vento	Walter Lima Jr.	Brazil
Round the Moons Between Earth and Sea	Giro di lune tra terra e mare	Giuseppe M. Gaudino	Italy, Germany
Seventh Heaven	Le Septième ciel	Benoît Jacquot	France
The Thief	Вор	Pavel Chukhraj	Russia
The Vesuvians	I vesuviani	Pappi Corsicato, Antonio Capuano, Antonietta De Lillo, Stefano Incerti, Mario Martone	Italy
Wild Games	Combat de fauves	Benoit Lamy	Belgium, Germany, France
The Winter Guest		Alan Rickman	United Kingdom

=== Out of competition ===
English title	Original title	Director(s)	Production country
Deconstructing Harry (opening film)		Woody Allen	United States
Danubio		Ivo B. Micheli	Italy
Full Tilt Boogie		Sarah Kelly	United States
The Kingdom II	Riget II	Lars von Trier	Denmark
Our God's Brother	Brat naszego Boga	Krzysztof Zanussi	Poland, Italy, Germany
Richard III (closing film)		André Calmettes and James Keane	France, United States

=== Midday (mezzogiorno) ===
English title	Original title	Director(s)	Production country
100% Arabica		Mahmoud Zemmouri	Algeria, France
Bent Familia		Nouri Bouzid	Tunisia
Five Stormy Days	Cinque giorni di tempesta	Francesco Calogero	Italy
Go for Gold!		Lucian Segura	Germany, Spain, France
In the Name of Innocence	Im Namen der Unschuld	Andreas Kleinert	Germany
Kokkuri-san	こっくりさん	Takahisa Zeze	Japan
The Locusts		John Patrick Kelley	United States
The Second Civil War		Joe Dante	United States
True Love and Chaos		Stavros Kazantzidis	Australia

=== Midnight (mezzanotte) ===
English title	Original title	Director(s)	Production country
Affliction		Paul Schrader	United States
Air Force One		Wolfgang Petersen	United States
The Bride's Journey	Il viaggio della sposa	Sergio Rubini	Italy
Cop Land		James Mangold	United States
Deceiver		Jonas and Joshua Pate	United States
Heroines	Héroïnes	Gérard Krawczyk	France
Marquise		Véra Belmont	France
Mimic		Guillermo del Toro	United States
The Tango Lesson	La lección de tango	Sally Potter	Argentina, United Kingdom

=== Venetian workshop ===
English title	Original title	Director(s)	Production country
Alors, voila		Michel Piccoli	France
The Collector	Neitoperho	Auli Mantila	Finland
Malemare		Pasquale Mazzarro	Italy
Miramar		Júlio Bressane	Brazil
The Night of the Painter	Der tag des malers	Werner Nekes	Germany
The Sanguinaires	Les Sanguinaires	Laurent Cantet	France
The Sticky Fingers of Time		Hilary Brougher	United States
Strawberry Fields		Rea Tajiri	United States
Subway Stories		Bob Balaban, Patricia Benoit, Julie Dash, Jonathan Demme, Ted Demme, Abel Ferrara, Alison Maclean, Craig McKay, Lucas Platt, Seth Rosenfeld	United States
Tamas and Juli	Tamás és Juli	Ildikó Enyedi	Hungary
Tatuaggi		Laura Angiulli	Italy
The Tree of Hanging Destinies	L'albero dei destini sospesi	Rachid Benhadj	Italy
Non Fiction
4 Little Girls		Spike Lee	United States
As Time Goes By	去日苦多	Ann Hui	Taiwan
HHH: Portrait de Hou Hsiao-hsien		Olivier Assayas	France, Taiwan
In memoriam Gyöngyössy Imre		Katalyn Peteny, Barna Kabay	Hungary
Kippur		Amos Gitai	Israel
Still Love You After All These	念你如昔	Stanley Kwan	Taiwan, China
The Voice of Bergman	Bergmans rost	Gunnar Bergdahl	Sweden
The Year After Dayton	Das Jahr nach Dayton	Nikolaus Geyrhalter	Austria

=== Special screenings ===
English title	Original title	Director(s)	Production country
Tribute to Alida Valli
The Third Man		Carol Reed	United Kingdom
Tribute to Gerard Depardieu
Hurricane Rosy	Temporale Rosy	Mario Monicelli	Italy, France
Tribute to Marcello Mastroianni
Marcello Mastroianni: I Remember (long version)	Mi ricordo, sì, io mi ricordo	Anna Maria Tatò	Italy
Tribute to Roberto Rossellini
Roberto Rossellini: il mestiere di uomo		Beppe Cino	Italy
The Taking of Power by Louis XIV	La prise de pouvoir par Louis XIV	Roberto Rossellini	France

== Independent sections ==
=== Venice International Film Critics' Week ===
The following feature films were selected to be screened as in competition for this section:

English title	Original title	Director(s)	Production country
The Fifth Season	Fasl-e panjom	Rafi Pitts	Iran
Gummo		Harmony Korine	United States
Marie from the Bay of Angels	Marie Baie des Anges	Manuel Pradal	France
Masumiyet		Zeki Demirkubuz	Turkey
Dance of the Wind	Swara Mandal	Rajan Khosa	India
To Die for Tano	Tano da morire	Roberta Torre	Italy
Unmade Beds		Nicholas Barker	United Kingdom

== Official awards ==
=== Main competition ===
- Golden Lion: Hana-bi by Takeshi Kitano
- Grand Special Jury Prize: Ovosodo by Paolo Virzi
- Golden Osella:
  - Best Original Screenplay: Nettoyage à sec for Gilles Taurand
  - Best Cinematography: Ossos for Emmanuel Machuel
  - Best Original Music: Chinese Box for Graeme Revell
- Volpi Cup for Best Actor: Wesley Snipes for One Night Stand
- Volpi Cup for Best Actress: Robin Tunney for Niagara, Niagara

=== Luigi de Laurentis award for a debut film ===
- To Die for Tano by Roberta Torre

=== Golden Lion for Lifetime Achievement ===
- Gérard Depardieu
- Stanley Kubrick
- Alida Valli

== Independent awards ==
=== The President of the Italian Senate's Gold Medal ===
- The Thief by Pavel Chukhraj

=== Prize of the International Youth Jury ===
- The Thief by Pavel Chukhraj

=== FIPRESCI Prize ===
- Love Stories by Jerzy Stuhr
- Twenty Four Seven by Shane Meadows
  - Honorable Mention: Harmony Korine for Gummo

=== OCIC Award ===
- The Winter Guest by Alan Rickman
  - Honorable Mention:
    - Jerzy Stuhr by Love Stories
    - Nouri Bouzid by Bent Familia

=== UNICEF Award ===
- The Thief by Pavel Chukhraj

=== UNESCO Award ===
- La strana storia di Banda Sonora by Francesca Archibugi)

=== Pasinetti Award ===
- Best Film: Giro di lune tra terra e mare
- Best Actor: Edoardo Gabbriellini for Ovosodo
- Best Actress: Emma Thompson for The Winter Guest

=== Pietro Bianco Award ===
- Bernardo Bertolucci

=== Isvema Award ===
- Giro di lune tra terra e mare by Giuseppe M. Gaudino

=== FEDIC Award ===
- To Die for Tano by Roberta Torre
  - Honorable Mention: Amleto... frammenti by Bruno Bigoni

=== Little Golden Lion ===
- Ovosodo by Paolo Virzi

=== Anicaflash Prize ===
- Love Stories by Jerzy Stuhr

=== Elvira Notari Prize ===
- Bent Familia by Nouri Bouzid

=== Bastone Bianco Award ===
- Alors voilà by Michel Piccoli

=== Sergio Trasatti Award ===
- Love Stories by Jerzy Stuhr
- In memoriam Gyöngyössy Imre by Barna Kabay

=== CinemAvvenire Award ===
- The Winter Guest by Alan Rickman

=== Enzo Serafin Award ===
- Ovosodo by Italo Petriccione

=== Kodak Award ===
- To Die for Tano by Roberta Torre
