= Antonio Pennarella =

Italian actor (1960–2018)

- Born: 27 May 1960; Naples, Italy
- Died: 24 August 2018 (aged 58); Naples, Italy
- Occupation: Actor
- Years active: 1988-2018
- Height: 1.75 m (5 ft 9 in)

Antonio Pennarella (27 May 1960 – 24 August 2018) was an Italian actor.

== Biography ==
Pennarella began his acting career on TV in the 1980s and became in the following 30 years one of the most known faces on the TV screen, getting roles for TV series such as Un Posto al Sole.

During his career he worked with directors like Marco Bellocchio, Francesco Maselli, Mario Martone and Daniele Luchetti.

He died on 24 August 2018, aged 58, after a long illness.

== Partial filmography ==
- The Butterfly's Dream (1994)
- Black Holes (1995)
- The Meter Reader (1995)
- The Vesuvians (1997)
- Red Moon (2001)
- Pater Familias (2002)
- On My Skin (2003)
- Mario's War (2005)
- The Red Shadows (2009)
- We Believed (2010)
- Piazza Fontana: The Italian Conspiracy (2012)
- Those Happy Years (2013)
- Song'e Napule (2013)
- Perez. (2014)
- The Legendary Giulia and Other Miracles (2015)
- Natale col Boss (2015)
- A Holy Venetian Family (2015)
- Indivisible (2016)
