= Toni Bertorelli =

Italian actor (1948–2017)

- Born: 18 March 1948; Barge, Piedmont, Italy
- Died: 25 May 2017 (aged 69); Rome, Italy
- Occupation: Actor
- Years active: 1971–2016

Toni Bertorelli (18 March 1948 – 26 May 2017) was an Italian actor. He performed in over sixty films.

== Biography ==
Bertorelli was born in Barge, Piedmont, Italy.

Bertorelli began his acting career in 1969 working with his friend Carlo Cecchi. He starred in early 1980s movies, but gained more popularity in the 1990s, starring in Mario Martone's Death of a Neapolitan Mathematician and Marco Tullio Giordana's Who Killed Pasolini?

During the 2000s, Bertorelli worked with directors like Nanni Moretti, Marco Bellocchio and Mel Gibson. In 2016, he played the role of Cardinal Caltanissetta in Paolo Sorrentino's short series The Young Pope.

Bertorelli died on 26 May 2017, at the age of 69, after a long illness.

== Filmography ==
Film
Year	Title	Role	Notes
1974	E cominciò il viaggio nella vertigine	Biktasev	
1983	Stangata napoletana		
1988	Tutta colpa della SIP	Lamberti	
1992	Death of a Neapolitan Mathematician	Antonio Alcamo	
1995	Who Killed Pasolini?	Inspector Pigna	
1996	La tenda nera		
1996	Cous-cous	Frankie	
1997	The Grey Zone	Judge Giudice Consoli	
1997	The Prince of Homburg	Elector	
1998	Elvjs e Merilijn	Colonel	
1999	Besame mucho	Don Tommaso	
2000	Johnny the Partisan	Johnny's Father	
2000	Holy Tongue	Krondano	
2000	Zora the Vampire	Dracula	
2001	La regina degli scacchi	Sterlizia	
2001	Territori d'ombra	Franz	
2001	The Son's Room	Patient	
2001	The Words of My Father	Zeno's Father	
2001	Light of My Eyes	Mario	
2002	My Mother's Smile	Ludovico Bulla	
2003	Now or Never	David's Father	
2004	The Passion of the Christ	Annas ben Seth	
2004	Pontormo – un amore eretico	Priore San Lorenzo	
2004	A luci spente	Ettore Benedetti	
2004	L'eretico - Un gesto di coraggio	Inquisitore	
2005	La passione di Giosué l'Ebreo	Don Isaac	
2005	Romanzo Criminale	La Voce	
2006	The Caiman	Indro Montanelli	
2007	Black Sun	Inspector	
2007	Silk	Verdun	
2015	Latin Lover	Picci	
2015	Blood of My Blood	Doctor Cavanna	

TV
Year	Title	Role	Notes
1992	Il Giovane Mussolini	Primo	3 episodes
1999	Sospetti		3 episodes
2002	St. Francis	Pope Innocent III	TV movie
2007	War and Peace	Prince Vasily Kuragin	4 episodes
2008	Pinocchio	The Fox	TV movie
2016	The Young Pope	Cardinal Caltanissetta	10 episodes, (final appearance)
