= Giogiò Franchini =

Italian film editor (born 1959)

- Born: 11 July 1959 (age 67); Naples, Italy
- Occupation: Film editor
- Years active: 1992-present

Giogiò Franchini (born 11 July 1959) is an Italian film editor, whose career spanned over 30 years.

== Life and career ==
Born in Naples, Franchini is the son of a lawyer. He started his career on stage as a light designer, and in 1992 he was put under contract by production company Megaris, collaborating to their television and film projects.

In 1998, Franchini won a Ciak d'Oro for Roberta Torre's To Die for Tano, and in 2005 he won a second Ciak d'Oro for Paolo Sorrentino's The Consequences of Love. In 2006, he received a Flaiano Prize for his work in Antonio Capuano's Mario's War and Sergio Rubini's Our Land. In 2008, he won a David di Donatello for best editing for Andrea Molaioli's The Girl by the Lake.

== Selected filmography ==
- Sacred Silence (1996)
- To Die for Tano (1997)
- The Vesuvians (1997)
- The Dust of Naples (1998)
- One Man Up (2001)
- Red Moon (2001)
- Winter (2002)
- The Remains of Nothing (2004)
- The Consequences of Love (2004)
- Mario's War (2005)
- Texas (2005)
- Our Land (2006)
- The Family Friend (2006)
- The Girl by the Lake (2007)
- At a Glance (2007)
- Lecture 21 (2008)
- The Seed of Discord (2008)
- Marriage and Other Disasters (2010)
- Dark Love (2010)
- La pecora nera (2010)
- The Jewel (2011)
- Kryptonite! (2011)
- Drifters (2011)
- Welcome Mr. President (2013)
- Miele (2013) )
- A Woman as a Friend (2014)
- Italiano medio (2015)
- Slam (2016)
- Omicidio all'italiana (2017)
- Bloody Richard (2017)
- Euphoria (2018)
- The Man Without Gravity (2019)
- Padrenostro (2020)
- The Time of Indifference (2020)
- Figli (2020)
- Rose Stone Star (2020)
- I fratelli De Filippo (2021)
- Last Night of Amore (2023)
- The Art of Joy (2024)
- My Tennis Maestro (2025)
