= Teresa Saponangelo =

Italian actress

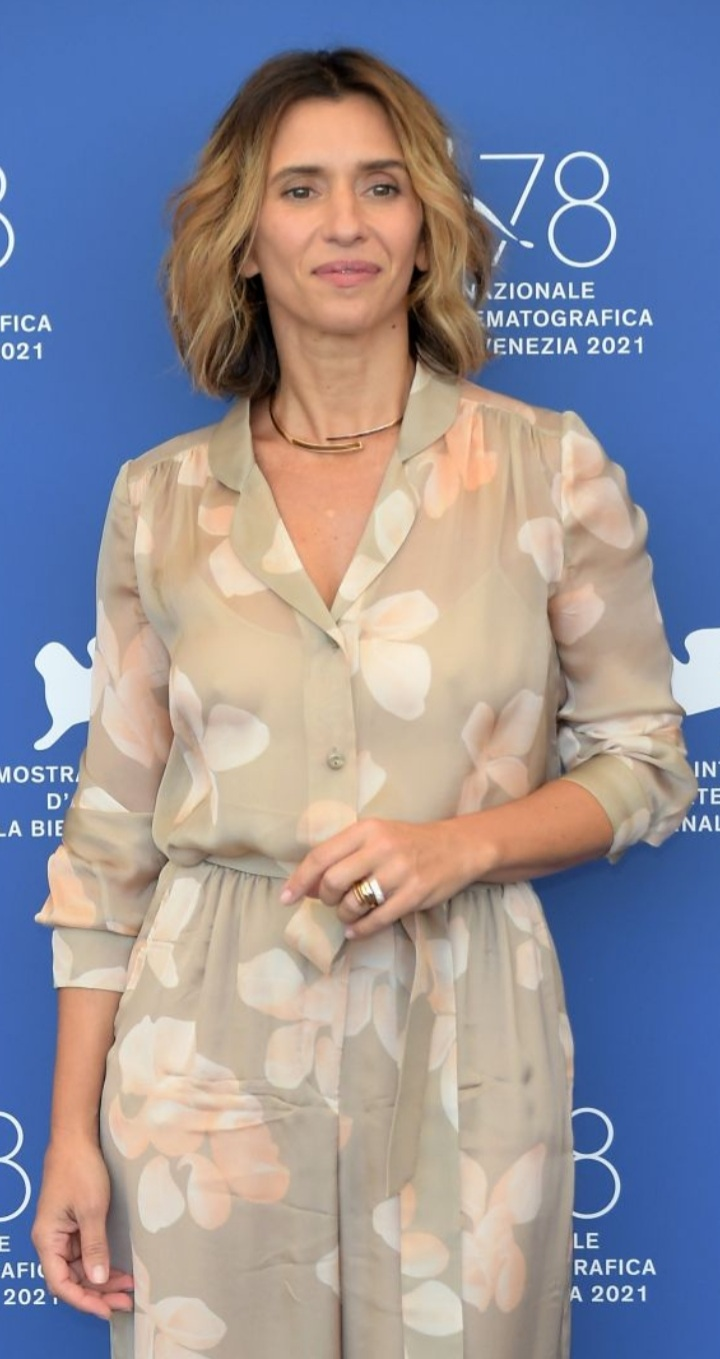
- Saponangelo at the 78th Venice International Film Festival in 2021
- Born: 22 October 1973 (age 52); Taranto, Apulia, Italy
- Education: École Philippe Gaulier; Accademia d'Arte Drammatica della Calabria
- Occupation: Actress

Teresa Saponangelo (born 22 October 1973) is an Italian film, television and stage actress. She has received numerous accolades including the David di Donatello Award, two Nastro d'Argento Awards of three nominations, and the Ubu Award.

Saponangelo's many film credits include Pájaros, Paolo Sorrentino's The Hand of God, for which she won the David di Donatello Award for Best Actress, the Nastro d'Argento Award for Best Actress, and the Pasinetti Award from the Venice Film Festival. She additionally won the Nastro d'Argento Award for Best Actress for Il buco in testa and received a nomination for In the Beginning There Was Underwear.

== Life and career ==
Teresa Saponangelo was born in Taranto, the daughter of a workman and a housewife, and lost her father at the age of two. In 1976 she moved to Naples, next to the Politeama Theater, with her mother and her brother. She graduated from Diploma di Musica (DAMS) at Roma Tre University, and appeared in a play titled Dentro la Cronaca dentro la storia by P. Amato.

After attending several dramatic societies, Saponangelo made her official stage debut in Giacomo Rizzo's Ce penza mammà. In 1994, she completed her studies at the Calabria School of Dramatic Arts in Reggio Calabria, at the suggestion of Giorgio Albertazzi, and under Philippe Gaulier at École Philippe Gaulier in France.

In 1994 she made her film debut in Il Verificatore by Stefano Incerti, and then appeared in films directed by Paolo and Vittorio Taviani, Sergio Rubini, Paolo Virzì, and Silvio Soldini, and on stage with directors Toni Servillo, Antonio Capuano, and Mario Martone, among others.

In 2000 she was nominated for Nastro d'Argento's Best Actress for her performance in Anna Negri's In the Beginning There Was Underwear; the same year she won the Ubu Award for her performance as Dorina in the stage play Tartufo.

== Filmography ==
=== Films ===
Year	Title	Role(s)	Notes	Ref.
1995	The Meter Reader	Valeria		
1995	Travelling Companion	Friend at Café	Cameo appearance	
1996	August Vacation	Irene Vitiello		
1996	Isotta	Caterina		
1996	Sacred Silence	Annamaria Pica		
1997	The Acrobats	Giusy		
1997	The Vesuvians	Teresa	Segment: "Il diavolo in bottiglia"	
1997	The Grey Zone	Patient	Cameo appearance	
1998	The Dust of Naples	Teresa		
1998	Dolce far niente	Rosa		
1999	In the Beginning There Was Underwear	Imma		
2000	Tutto l'amore che c'è	Maura		
2002	Two Friends	Maria		
2002	La vita degli altri	Luisa		
2004	I Can See It in Your Eyes	Chiara		
2007	Ossidiana	Maria Palligiano		
2008	Black and White	Esmeralda		
2008	Your Whole Life Ahead of You	Movie actress	Cameo appearance	
2010	La pecora nera	Teresa		
2010	Come Undone	Miriam		
2011	Il paese delle spose infelici	Natuccio's mother		
2014	La stoffa dei sogni	Maria Campese		
2017	Gramigna	Anna		
2018	Il bene mio	Rita		
2019	Procelain	Cristina		
2021	The Hand of God	Maria		
2023	Born for You	Teresa		
2023	I limoni d'inverno	Eleonora		
2024	Birds Flying East	Elisabetta		
2025	Hungry Bird			

=== Television ===
Year	Title	Role(s)	Notes	Ref.
2004	Luisa Sanfelice	Assunta	Television film	
2006	Attacco allo Stato	Maria Amore	Television film	
2008	La squadra	Alessia Marciano	Episode: "Panni sporchi"	
2008	La nuova squadra	Alessia Marciano	Main role	
2011	Rossella	Paolina Andrei	Main role	
2014	Squadra antimafia – Palermo oggi	Carmela Ragno	5 episodes	
2015	La dama velata	Maddalena Staineri	Main role	
2016	Il sindaco pescatore	Carla	Television movie	
2017	Sirene	Stefania Maldini	Main role	
2017	Purché finisca bene	Paola	Episode: "Bastano un paio di baffi"	
2020	Vivi e lascia vivere	Daniela Sonnino	Main role	
2022	Vincenzo Malinconico, Unsuccessful Lawyer	Nives	Recurring role	
2025	Sara: Woman in the Shadows	Sara		
