= In the Beginning There Was Underwear =

- Directed by: Anna Negri
- Written by: Rossana Campo; Ivan Cotroneo; Davide Ferrario; Doriana Leondeff; Anna Negri
- Cinematography: Giovanni Cavallini
- Music by: Dominik Scherrer
- Release date: 1999
- Language: Italian

In the Beginning There Was Underwear (Italian: In principio erano le mutande) is a 1999 Italian romantic comedy film written and directed by Anna Negri. It was screened in the "Forum" section at the 49th Berlin International Film Festival.

== Cast ==
- Teresa Saponangelo: Imma
- Stefania Rocca: Teresa
- Bebo Storti: Michele
- Filippo Timi: Tasca
- Monica Scattini: Lady Driver
- Pao Pei Andreoli: Marco
