= Tonino De Bernardi =

Italian film director (1937)

- Born: 24 May 1937 (age 89); Chivasso, Piedmont, Italy
- Citizenship: Italian
- Education: University of Turin
- Known for: underground cinema, experimental cinema
- Spouse: Mariella Navale
- Awards: Venice International Film Festival, Nomination Best film Premio Orizzonti, Medea Miracle, Venice International Film Festival (2007), Nomination Golden Lion, Appassionate, World Wide Video Festival (1999), La Haya, First Prize (ex-aequo with Jean-Luc Godard, 1989)
- Scientific career
- Fields: Cinema
- Thesis: Neoclassical Stravinsky
- Academic advisors: Massimo Mila

Tonino De Bernardi (born May 24, 1937) is an Italian auteur and screenwriter, a prolific anti-commercial director with more than 40 feature films in credits.

== Life and career ==
Tonino di Bernardi was born in Chivasso near Turin to Olga Bagnasacco and, after graduating in literature with Massimo Mila, with a thesis on neoclassical Igor Stravinsky, Tonino De Bernardi joined the Cooperativa Cinema Indipendente Italiano in 1967, based first in Naples and then in Rome. In Turin he met Paolo Menzio ("Il mostro verde", 16mm, in competition at Knokke-le-Zoute 1967–68, EXPRMNTL, Experimental Film Festival) and Pia Epremian De Silvestris (De Bernardi acted, together with Mariella Navale, in "Medea" and other films of hers, and Pia, in turn, appears in De Bernardi's works). In Rome, the Cooperative's films were often screened at festivals organized at the Filmstudio '70 (from March 1968). Among others, the members of the cooperative included Giorgio Turi, Adamo Vergine, Alfredo Leonardi, Gianfranco Baruchello, Massimo Bacigalupo (who later became a close friend of Tonino and Mariella), Luca Patella, Piero Bargellini, Guido Lombardi, and Anna Lajolo.

As recalled by the director, at the age of 29 he filmed his first movie titled Cara Meri, but the tape had been lost over the years. De Bernardi's second film, Il Mostro Verde (The Green Monster) was created in collaboration with Paolo Menzio, a close friend. Il Mostro Verde opened a trilogy La favolosa storia in which de Bernardi boldly explored transgressions of gender and sexual binaries. The experimental visuals, featuring audio-visual juxtapositions, split-screen, and a flamboyant colour palette.

Massimo Bacigalupo recalled the impression of first time seeing Il Bestiario:

Il Bestiario, four rolls by Tonino De Bernardi projected simultaneously on the screen, with magnetic sound. In these, images of faces and large drapes and disguises were shown, revealing De Bernardi's passion for intersections and overrepressions of the sexes as well as colours, all a burble of multicoloured monsters after the green one in the first film with Menzio.

De Bernardi was a school teacher in Casalborgone until 1992. His first ‘official’ feature film, Elettra da Sofocle, was released in 1987. The movie was shot in Casalborgone with non-professional actors from the city.

By the end of the 1980s, De Bernardi was better known and appreciated abroad than in Italy. It was only in 1991 that he received his first recognition, followed by headlines in major national newspapers. His next film, Viaggio a Sodoma, brought him the main prize at the World Wide Video Festival 1989 in the Netherlands. Decades later, de Bernardi admitted that it was the award that he was still most proud of. In 1993, he concluded his tetralogia with Uccelli del desiderio, well received at the Torino Film Festival and nominated for Best Italian Fiction Film. In 1994, his film Piccoli Orrori received the Special Mention prize at the Taormina Film Fest.

In 1999, his Appassionata was selected for the Venice Film Festival. Filmed in the back streets of Naples, the movie was praised for its bold concept and execution, although criticised for not being internationally understandable by being ‘too Italian’. In Appassionata, De Bernardi discovered Filippo Timi, an actor that would become a cult performer in Italy. Timi also starred in the lead role in De Bernardi's Rosatigre. Released in 2000, the film could be described as a Bildungsroman: it follows the protagonist Antonello, a fragile and irreverent transvestite played by Timi, as he embarks in journeys and relationships, while trying to figure out his own life. The film was selected for Settimana della Critica of the Venice Film Festival 2005.

De Bernardi's Passato presente/Angeli laici cadono (2005) is a film about various forms of migration, a work that reflects work, society, relationships and family, mixing the present and the past.

His 2007 film Médée miracle starring Isabelle Huppert closed the Orizzonti section of the 64th Venice Film Festival. De Bernardi's Medea is a contemporary interpretation of Euripides’ tragedy. The critics praised the film as a 'precious gift to the audience’, a clandestine charm. This film can be called the most conventional in De Bernardi's filmography: it is shot mainly in color, has a standard length of 90 minutes, and is in the classic 35 mm format.

Released in 2009, Pane/Piazza delle Camelie told a story of Carlo e Grazia, bread bakers from a small town in Tuscany. The hardships of their lives, long nights of hard work with no days off, is contrasted by stories of young and modern city dwellers. In Pane/Piazza delle Camelie de Bernardi tried to explore our present and its contradictions, in the juxtaposition of old and new, from one generation to the next.

In 2023, Tonino de Bernardi donated his archive to the Museo Nacional del Cinema.

== Style and themes ==
De Bernardi's approach, as confirmed by the auteur himself, is rooted in the American underground cinema of the 1960s, he refers to Jonas Mekas as the figure who inspired him not to rely on the industry. His style is deeply experimental, non-conventional, some critics even described his movies as ‘non-film’. He always tried to distance from the ‘traditional’ cinema and its norms. For example, the film Rapporto coniugal parentale (1971-1975) was largely created from family videos, where De Bernardi and his wife Mariella Navale reflected on their lives as spouses and parents. In 1982 he released Donne, a 12-hour Super 8 film, that was screened 6 days a week for 2 hours per day.

De Bernardi never had a producer or a production company to sponsor his projects. Many of his films were made with the help of friends and starred non-professional artists in the lead roles. However, such stars as Bernardo Bertolucci, Enrico Ghezzi, Mario Martone, are also parts of his cinematic universe.

De Bernardi's early movies seem strongly connected to Arte Povera. A recurrent theme and a constant model followed by De Bernardi in his narrative films is the Greek tragedy: classic works of Sophocles, Euripides, Aeschylus, ancient mythology.

In his films he puts the spotlight on heroes who are often ignored by society, pushed to the margins. The director prefers women as protagonists, as he explained, he grew up mostly surrounded by women, their strength and sensitivity defined his perception of the world. In his films, de Bernardi wanted to give a voice to them, who are usually oppressed and wounded.

== Influence and recognition ==
Italian critics have characterized De Bernardi as an uncompromising figure in national cinema, while a 2022 retrospective at the Centre Pompidou highlighted his sustained work within experimental film.

In 2018, a Portuguese director Teresa Villaverde premiered her experimental film Galileo's Thermometer: A meeting of minds with Tonino De Bernardi at the International Film Festival Rotterdam. For three summer months, the documentary followed the daily life of the director and his wife, interspersed with memories, poems, music, films, landscapes.

Tonino De Bernardi – One Time, One Encounter, a dedication to de Bernardi, was filmed in 2022 by Daniele Segre.

== Awards ==
- Lifetime Achievement Award, Lucca Film Festival, 2024;
- Venice International Film Festival, Nomination Best Film Premio Orizzonti, Medea Miracle, 2007
- Venice International Film Festival, Nomination Golden Lion, Appassionate, 1999
- Taormina Film Fest, Mención Especial, Piccoli orrori, 1994
- Taormina Film Fest, Nomination Golden Charybdis, Piccoli orrori, 1994
- Torino Film Festival, Nomination Best Italian Fiction Film, Uccelli mendichi, uccelli d'amore, uccelli perduti, 1993
- Torino Film Festival, Nomination Best Italian Film, Leçons de ténèbres n. 2 e 3, 1991
- World Wide Video Festival, La Haya, First Prize (ex-aequo with Jean-Luc Godard), 1989
- Torino Film Festival, Nomination Best Feature Film, Elettra, 1987

== Filmography ==
- before 1967 – Cara Meri;
- 1967 – Il mostro verde;
- 1967 – Il Bestiario;
- 1968-1969 – Dei;
- 1971-1972 – Il quadrato;
- 1973-1976 – Il rapporto coniugal parentale;
- 1977-1979 – L’io e le aggregazioni;
- 1980-1982 – Donne;
- 1988 – Viaggio a Sodoma;
- 1994 – Piccoli orrori;
- 1997 – Fiori del destino;
- 1999 – Appassionate;
- 2000 – Rosatigre;
- 2001 – La strada nel bosco;
- 2001 – Farelavita;
- 2002 – Lei;
- 2002 – Le cinéma dans tous ses états;
- 2003 – Serva e padrona;
- 2003 – Latitudini (2003);
- 2004 – Marlene de Sousa;
- 2005 – Passato presente;
- 2006 – Accoltellati (Accoltellatori);
- 2007 – Médée miracle (2007);
- 2008 – Pane/Piazza delle camelie (2008);
- 2010 – Butterfly – L’attesa;
- 2011 – Ed è così. Circa. Più o meno (2011);
- 2012 – Casa dolce casa (2012);
- 2013 – Hotel de l’Univers (2013);
- 2014 – Jour et nuit - Delle donne e degli uomini perduti (2014);
- 2015 – Il sogno dell’India - Quarant’anni dopo (2015);
- 2016 – Mudar De Vida - Libera vita;
- 2018 – Ifigenia in Aulide (2018);
- 2019 – Resurrezione (2019);
- 2022 – Ou n'etes vous?;
- 2022 – Universi circoscritti 2.

== Bibliography ==
- Anthony Cristiano, Experimental and Independent Italian Cinema-Legacies and Transformations Into the Twenty-First Century, Edinburgh University Press, 2020, ISBN 9781474474054
- Andrea Mariani, Denis Lotti, Diego Cavallotti, Scrivere la storia, costruire l’archivio-Note per una storiografia del cinema e dei media, Meltemi, 2021, ISBN 9788855194167
- Angela Bianca Saponari, Federico Zecca, Oltre l’inetto-Rappresentazioni plurali della mascolinità nel cinema italiano, Meltemi, 2021, ISBN 9788855195270
- Sergio Toffetti, Stefano Francia di Celle, Dalle lontane province. Il cinema di Tonino De Bernardi, Lindau, 1995, ISBN 9788871801278

== Literature ==
- Simoni, Paolo (2018). "Lo spazio incerto. Curare gli archivi del cinema sperimentale e d'artista". Cinergie – Il cinema e le altre arti. 14. ISSN 2280-9481.
- Cristiano, Anthony; Coen, Carlo (2020). Experimental and Independent Italian Cinema (PDF). Edinburgh: Edinburgh University Press. ISBN 9781474474054.
- Francione, Fabio (2002). Marco Melani. Il viandante ebbro. Scritti, testimonianze, conversazioni (PDF). Alessandria: Edizioni Falsopiano.
