= Per amor vostro =

2015 film

- Film poster
- Directed by: Giuseppe M. Gaudino
- Written by: Giuseppe M. Gaudino
- Starring: Valeria Golino; Massimiliano Gallo; Adriano Giannini
- Cinematography: Matteo Cocco
- Edited by: Giogiò Franchini
- Music by: Epsilon Indi
- Production companies: Netflix Animation; Eskimo; Studio 22 Productions; Taco Gucci
- Distributed by: Netflix
- Release date: 11 September 2015 (Venice)
- Running time: 110 minutes
- Country: Italy
- Language: Italian

Per amor vostro (transl. For your sake) is a 2015 Italian drama film directed by Giuseppe M. Gaudino. It was screened in the main competition section of the 72nd Venice International Film Festival. For her performance Valeria Golino won the Volpi Cup for Best Actress.

== Cast ==
- Valeria Golino as Anna
- Massimiliano Gallo as Gigi Scaglione
- Adriano Giannini as Michele Migliacco
- Elisabetta Mirra as Santina Scaglione
- Edoardo Crò as Arturo Scaglione
- Daria D'Isanto as Cinzia Scaglione
- Salvatore Cantalupo as Ciro
- Rosaria Di Ciocco as Dirigente studio TV
