= The Mayor of Rione Sanità =

2019 film

- Theatrical release poster
- Italian: Il sindaco del Rione Sanità
- Directed by: Mario Martone
- Written by: Mario Martone; Ippolita Di Majo
- Based on: Il sindaco del Rione Sanità by Eduardo De Filippo
- Produced by: Carlotta Calori; Francesca Cima; Nicola Giuliano
- Starring: Francesco Di Leva; Massimiliano Gallo; Roberto De Francesco
- Cinematography: Ferran Paredes Rubio
- Edited by: Jacopo Quadri
- Music by: Ralph P
- Production companies: Indigo Film; Rai Cinema; Malìa
- Distributed by: Nexo Digital
- Release dates: 30 August 2019 (Venice); 30 September 2019 (Italy)
- Running time: 115 minutes
- Country: Italy
- Language: Italian

The Mayor of Rione Sanità (Italian: Il sindaco del Rione Sanità) is a 2019 Italian crime drama film directed by Mario Martone, based on the 1960 play of the same name by Eduardo De Filippo. The film is intended as a modern take on the play, inspired by the theatrical adaptation directed by Martone in 2018, with several members of the cast returning. It was selected to compete for the Golden Lion at the 76th Venice International Film Festival.

== Plot ==
In the Rione Sanità neighborhood of Naples, Antonio Barracano –known as “The Mayor”– is an undisputed authority amongst both common people and the Camorra, whose job is to settle disputes outside the law, even by unorthodox methods. When he's asked to help a young man determined to kill his father, however, Barracano will have to make a choice regarding his self-imposed moral code.

== Cast ==
- Francesco Di Leva as Antonio Barracano
- Massimiliano Gallo as Arturo Santaniello
- Roberto De Francesco as Fabio Della Ragione
- Adriano Pantaleo
- Daniela Ioia
- Giuseppe Gaudino
- Gennaro Di Colandrea
- Lucienne Perreca
- Salvatore Presutto
- Viviana Cangiano
- Domenico Esposito
- Ralph P
- Armando De Giulio
- Daniele Baselice
- Morena di Leva
- Ernesto Mahieux

== Release ==
The film had its world premiere on 30 August 2019 at the Venice International Film Festival. It had a limited release in Italy from 30 September to 2 October 2019 by Nexo Digital.

== Reception ==
The film received an eight-minute standing ovation during its premiere in Venice. Game Today Magazine prized the acting proof of the cast ensemble, in particularly the performance of Francesco Di Leva, and defined the film: "[...] a Greek tragedy philologically wiped out by shootings, blood and violence, all kept off-screen. A chamber drama of funereal impassivity but of moral heartbeats fortunately more visceral than verbose [...]". Cineuropa wrote that: "At a great distance from the Gomorra of television, Martone's film is a story without time or place, about guilt, redemption and hope — as shown by the protagonist’s responsible gesture at the film’s end, open and non-pacifying, and which De Filippo, already 60 years ago, had written without any sense of false optimism. With The Mayor of Rione Sanità, the Neapolitan director once more creates a contact between cinema and theatre, inspired by Polanski, Fassbinder, Kurosawa and certainly Hitchcock, moving his characters in large but closed spaces, and putting them in focus with lengthy close-ups". The Hollywood Reporter's Deborah Young wrote that Martone's film: "[..] is a challenging work whose verbal violence is engrossing but also repellent. It is certainly one of the director’s more successful films, but it suffers from the same intellectual barriers that have made his work so difficult to access for general audiences. As fascinating as the actors’ performances are to watch, their meaning is not so easy to interpret, and many willing viewers will leave the film more bemused than enlightened".
