= Sara: Woman in the Shadows =

2025 Italian television series

- Genre: Crime drama
- Written by: Donatella Diamanti; Mario Cristiani; Giovanni Galassi
- Directed by: Carmine Elia
- Starring: Teresa Saponangelo; Claudia Gerini
- Composer: Ralf Hildenbeutel
- Country of origin: Italy
- Original language: Italian
- No. of series: 1
- No. of episodes: 6

Production
- Producers: Carlo Degli Esposti; Nicola Serra
- Cinematography: Marco Cuzzupoli
- Production company: Palomar

Original release
- Network: Netflix
- Release: 3 June 2025

Sara: Woman in the Shadows (Italian: Sara - La donna nell'ombra) is an Italian crime drama television series starring Teresa Saponangelo in the title role. It was released on Netflix in June 2025.

== Cast ==
- Teresa Saponangelo as Sara Morozzi

- Angela Fontana as young Sara

- Claudia Gerini as Teresa

- Elena Giovanardi as young Teresa

- Flavio Furno as Davide Pardo
- Chiara Celotto as Viola
- Carmine Recano as Massimiliano
- Antonio Gerardi as Tarallo
- Maria Pia Gambardella as Annamaria
- Pia Lanciotti as Rosaria
- Erasmo Genzini as Sergio Minucci
- Peppino Mazzotta as Enrico Vigilante
- Ernesto Mahieux as Sergio's kidnapper
- Fabio De Caro as Sergio's kidnapper
- Francesco Acquaroli as Catapano
- Ivan Castiglione as Ludovico Terzani
- Gabriele Guerra as Di Blasio
- Clotilde Sabatino as Marta
- Giacomo Giorgio as Attilio Musella
- Massimo Popolizio as Corrado Lembo
- Giuseppe De Rosa as Anzovino
- Nello Mascia as the professor

== Production ==
The series was produced by Palomar. It is based on the Maurizio De Giovanni's crime novel series Le indagini di Sara ('The Investigations of Sara').

== Release ==
The series was internationally released on Netflix on 3 June 2025.

== Reception ==
On the review aggregator website Rotten Tomatoes, 80% of 5 critics' reviews are positive. Decider's critic John Serba praised the character dynamics of the series and noted "If we're lucky, there'll be a few let's see her lip-read her way out of THIS one moments to enliven the series; if not, it might still be pretty good anyway".
