= Fabrizia Ramondino =

Italian writer

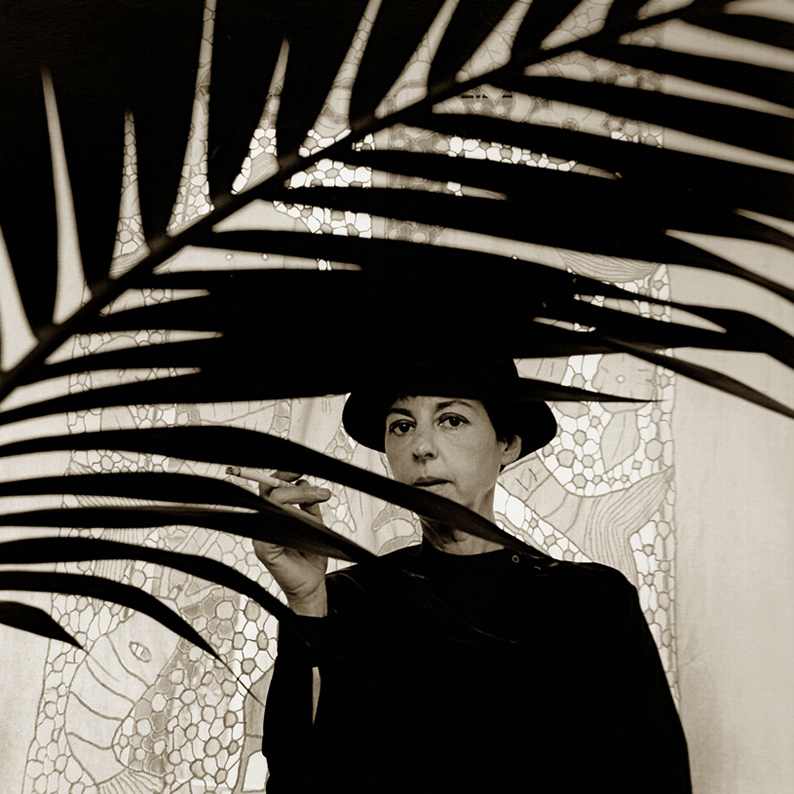
- Fabrizia Ramondino in 1987, photographed by Augusto De Luca
- Born: 31 August 1936; Naples
- Died: 23 June 2008 (aged 71); Gaeta
- Known for: Italian author of fiction
- Movement: Social activist

Fabrizia Ramondino (1936–2008) was an Italian author who has many works "which includes and crosses the boundaries between poetry, novels, plays, travelogues, memoirs, confession, self-reflection, anthropological, cultural and linguistic comment" according to Adalgisa Giorgio, who has conducted research of Ramondino's life and works.

== Ramondino's life ==
Fabrizia Ramondino was born in Naples in 1936 and moved to the island of Majorca that same year after her father was named Italian consul. She was raised on this small Spanish island until she was eight years old. For the rest of her life, she lived in different countries, including France, Germany, and Italy. Her travels also took her to China, Quebec, Australia and the Sahara. Ramondino spent many years in Naples which is the culture she relates to most in her writing. During her time in Naples, Ramondino volunteered as a teacher at the Associazione Risveglio Napoli school. She obtained a degree in languages at Naples Eastern University. She also worked as a French teacher at multiple state schools. She was a political and social activist for Centro di Coordinamento Campano, "a small organisation of the new left which worked primarily with the urban unemployed and poor agricultural labourers". Ramondino gave birth to her first daughter in Naples. These different cultures that she has been faced with throughout her life shape and inspire every piece of Ramondino's work. In 1944, Ramondino returned to Naples. She lived in France from 1948 to 1950, then she returned to Naples. From 1954 to 1956, Ramondino lived in Germany. She returned to Italy, living in Naples and Rome before going back to Naples in 1960. She received a degree in languages from the Istituto Universitario Orientale. Between 1966 and 1984, she taught French. She left Naples for Itri after the earthquake in 1980.

In 1981, she published her first novel Althénopis. During the 1808s, she was a journalist for Il Mattino and other newspapers. Ramondino worked with Mario Martone on the 1992 film Morte di un matematico napoletano. Again with Martone, she wrote the 1994 play Terremoto con madre e figlia.

Ramondino was a finalist for the Grinzane Cavour Prize in 1999 for L’isola riflessa. She was awarded the Flaiano literary prize in 2000 and received the Pasolini Poetry Award for Per un sentiero chiaro in 2004.

She died in Gaeta at the age of 71.

== Ramondino's writing ==
Ramondino is an author known to relate all of her writing to her experiences. Naples is the main culture that Ramondino absorbs into her writing. Not only does she have the setting of her novels and stories in Naples, but she "placed [herself] in the position of partial outsider(s) to the culture and languages". By doing so, she sets her work apart and allows herself to observe the "mores of the middle and upper bourgeoisie, with the class consciousness of a materialist" and making her "an exile in her own homeland". This perspective that she has in her writing is demonstrated as she approaches the Neapolitan language and also as an outsider. Ramondino "only occasionally inserts words of Neapolitan origin" into her work. She also often uses footnotes to help one understand these words. Ramondino wraps her audience in this sense of looking in from the outside of culture in her readings. She intertwines them flawlessly into the culture of the cities her stories are set in.

== Selected works ==
Her works include:

- Torie di patio (1983)
- Star di casa (1991)
- In viaggio (1995)
- L’isola riflessa (1998)

== Bibliography ==
- Giorgio, Adalgisa. "Fabrizia Ramondino." Home. Institute of Modern Languages Research, n.d. Web. 18 Oct. 2014.
- Marotti, Maria O. Italian Women Writers from the Renaissance to the Present: Revising the Canon. University Park, Pa: Pennsylvania State University Press, 1996. Print.
- Riva, Massimo. Italian Tales: An Anthology of Contemporary Italian Fiction. New Haven, CT: Yale University Press, 2004. Print.
