= The Mayor (1997 film) =

1997 film by Ugo Fabrizio Giordani

- Directed by: Ugo Fabrizio Giordani
- Produced by: Antonio Avati; Pupi Avati
- Starring: Anthony Quinn; Raoul Bova; Maria Grazia Cucinotta; Anna Bonaiuto; Franco Citti; Romina Mondello; Lino Troisi
- Cinematography: Pasquale Rachini
- Music by: Antonio Di Pofi
- Release date: 1997
- Country: Italy

The Mayor (Italian: Il sindaco) is a 1997 Italian drama film directed by Ugo Fabrizio Giordani. It is based on the Eduardo De Filippo's play Il sindaco del Rione Sanità.

== Cast ==
- Anthony Quinn: Antonio Barracano
- Raoul Bova: Rafiluccio Santaniello
- Maria Grazia Cucinotta: Rituccia
- Lino Troisi: Fabio Della Ragione
- Anna Bonaiuto: Armida
- Romina Mondello: Geraldina
- Franco Citti: Arturo Santaniello
- Gaetano Amato: Pasquale 'o naso
