= Onda su onda =

- Theatrical Release Poster
- Directed by: Rocco Papaleo
- Written by: Federica Pontremoli; Rocco Papaleo; Walter Lupo
- Produced by: Benedetto Habib; Fabrizio Donvito; Marco Cohen
- Starring: Rocco Papaleo; Alessandro Gassmann; Luz Cipriota; Massimiliano Gallo; Silvia Pérez
- Cinematography: Maura Morales Bergmann
- Edited by: Christian Lombardi
- Music by: Francesco Accardo; Rudy Pusateri
- Production companies: La Productora Films; Indiana Production; Warner Bros. Entertainment Italia
- Distributed by: Warner Bros. Pictures
- Release date: 18 February 2016
- Country: Italy
- Language: Italian

Onda su onda is a 2016 Italian comedy film directed by Rocco Papaleo and released on February 18, 2016, by Warner Bros. Pictures.

== Cast ==
- Rocco Papaleo as Gegè Cristofori
- Alessandro Gassmann as Ruggero
- Luz Cipriota as Gilda Mandarino
- Massimiliano Gallo as Comandante De Lorenzo
- Silvia Pérez as Rosalba Bolena
- Jerry Accardo as Eros
- Maximiliano Pereyra as Peaton
