= Sacred Silence =

- Directed by: Antonio Capuano
- Written by: Antonio Capuano
- Starring: Fabrizio Bentivoglio
- Cinematography: Antonio Baldoni
- Edited by: Giogiò Franchini
- Release date: 1996
- Language: Italian

Sacred Silence (Italian: Pianese Nunzio, 14 anni a maggio) is a 1996 Italian film directed by Antonio Capuano that deals with a Catholic priest, his pederastic relationship with a Napolitan street boy, and the domination of daily life in Southern Italy by the Camorra. The title translates as Pianese Nunzio, 14 in May and the movie was released in the US with the title Sacred Silence.

== Plot ==
Don Lorenzo Borrelli (Fabrizio Bentivoglio) is a priest in a poor neighborhood in Naples where Mafia killings are a daily occurrence and most young people see organized crime as a way to earn respect. Don Borelli tries as best as he can to persuade the adolescents that the Camorra is at odds with Catholicism, but has to learn that nothing will change as long as their parents silently accept the Mafia supremacy.

Borrelli's personal life centers on his relationship with a 13-year-old choir boy, Nunzio Pianese (Emanuele Gargiulo), who is not only strikingly handsome but also a very talented musician. Nunzio plans on becoming a priest as well, as the easy life of a priest without worries about the future appeals to him.

The mobsters figure that a child molestation charge is a convenient way to get rid of the incendiary Don Lorenzo and try to get the local authorities to investigate. Meanwhile, Nunzio begins to doubt if he should stay his course or give in to the pressure to denounce Don Lorenzo.

In the end, Nunzio seems to give in and eventually reports Don Lorenzo for molestation, despite knowing that he was the only person who ever cared about his future.

== Cast ==
- Fabrizio Bentivoglio as Don Lorenzo Borrelli
- Emanuele Gargiulo as Nunzio Pianese
- Rosaria De Cicco as Rosaria
- Teresa Saponangelo as Anna Maria Pica
- Antonella Stefanucci as Sandra
- Tonino Taiuti as Cuccarini
