= We'll Be Young and Beautiful =

2018 drama film

- Directed by: Letizia Lamartire
- Screenplay by: Marco Borromei; Letizia Lamartire; Anna Zagaglia
- Starring: Barbora Bobuľová; Alessandro Piavani; Massimiliano Gallo
- Cinematography: Giuseppe Chessa
- Edited by: Fabrizio Franzini
- Music by: Matteo Buzzanca
- Release date: 2018
- Language: Italian

We'll Be Young and Beautiful (Italian: Saremo giovani e bellissimi) is a 2018 Italian drama film co-written and directed by Letizia Lamartire.

The film premiered at the 75th edition of the Venice Film Festival, in the Venice International Critics' Week sidebar. Its theme song "Tic tac", composed by Matteo Buzzanca and Lorenzo Vizzini and performed by Barbora Bobuľová, got a Nastro d'argento nomination for best original song.

== Cast ==
- Barbora Bobuľová as Isabella
- Alessandro Piavani as Bruno
- Massimiliano Gallo as Umberto
- Federica Sabatini as Arianna
- Elisabetta De Vito as Amalia
- Ciro Scalera as Giorgio
- Victoria Silvestro as Martina
- Matteo Buzzanca as Torrione
