= Lola Pagnani =

Italian actress (born 1972)

- Born: Anna Lola Pagnani Stravos; 3 April 1972 (age 54); Rome, Italy
- Other names: Lola Stravos; Anna Lola Pagnani
- Years active: 1989–present

Lola Pagnani (born 3 April 1972) is an Italian actress.

== Life and career ==
She was born in Rome as Anna Lola Pagnani Stavros, the daughter of writer and screenplayer Enzo Pagnani. She graduated in Paris at the age of 17 years in contemporary dance, and was the first dancer of Momix for the World Tour, and successively collaborated on the choreography of the Cirque du Soleil in Montreal. She was first dancer at the Opera House in Munich under the direction of Lina Wertmüller and conductor Giuseppe Sinopoli. Afterwards she graduated in contemporary dance at Alvin Ailey American Dance Theater in New York City. Later she studied acting at the HB Studio, also in New York. She then returned to Italy.

Back in Italy she started working with members of the Italian and international cinema and theatre, such as Ettore Scola, Giulio Base, Lina Wertmüller; she also played for Spike Lee and John Turturro and Abel Ferrara. In Italy she was a testimonial of Lavazza with Tullio Solenghi and Riccardo Garrone and worked for two consecutive years at the talkshow Maurizio Costanzo Show. She was invited to work with Enrico Montesano, Marco Columbro, Barbara De Rossi, Blas Roca Rey, Enrico Brignano, Nino Manfredi, Vittorio Gassman and Shelley Winters, who took her under her personal custody to study to Los Angeles at the Actors Studio. She also studied privately with Teddey Sherman in Los Angeles.

She worked with Rai International in New York in several programs and hosted PoP Italia. She can boast collaborations with the magazine Associazione Via Condotti of Gianni Battistoni.

Lately she has decided to make a documentary along with American producer and director Melissa Balin, inspired by a personal legal fact as a victim of a camorra plot. The project is named Women Seeking Justice and will include stories of injustice from all over the globe. She speaks Italian, French, Spanish and English fluently.

== Filmography ==
=== Cinema ===
- Trafitti da un raggio di sole (1995) – Fabiola
- The Dust of Naples (1996) – Rosita
- The Nymph (1996) – Lucia
- Ferdinando and Carolina (1999) – Sara Goudar
- La bomba (1999) – Daisy
- Il pranzo della domenica (2002)
- Gente di Roma (2003)
- Women Seeking Justice (2007)

=== Television ===
- Pazza famiglia (1995)
- Commissario Raimondi (1998) – Esmeralda
- Anni 50 (1998)
- La squadra (2000)
- Un posto al sole (2001) – Roberta Cantone
- Francesca e Nunziata (2001)
- Carabinieri 5 (2005)
- Un ciclone in famiglia 2 (2005)
- Donne sbagliate (2006)
- Capri (2006) – Maria Rosaria

=== Theater ===
- Vergine Regina (1996)
- Anatra all'arancia (1997)
- Carmen (1987)
