= Hungry Bird (film) =

2025 film by Antonio Capuano

- Italian theatrical release poster
- Italian: L'isola di Andrea
- Directed by: Antonio Capuano
- Written by: Antonio Capuano
- Produced by: Andrea Leone; Antonella Di Martino; Dario Formisano; Nicola Giuliano; Lucy De Crescenzo
- Starring: Teresa Saponangelo; Vinicio Marchioni; Andrea Migliucci
- Cinematography: Matteo Cocco
- Edited by: Diego Liguori
- Production companies: Mosaicon Film; Eskimo; Indigo Film; Europictures; Rai Cinema
- Distributed by: Europictures
- Release dates: 5 September 2025 (Venice); 2 October 2025 (Italy)
- Running time: 101 minutes
- Country: Italy
- Language: Italian

Hungry Bird (Italian: L'isola di Andrea, lit. 'Andrea's island') is a 2025 Italian drama film written and directed by Antonio Capuano. It stars Teresa Saponangelo, Vinicio Marchioni, and Andrea Migliucci. The film had its world premiere out of competition at the 82nd Venice International Film Festival on 5 September 2025. It received a theatrical release in Italy on 2 October 2025 by Europictures.

== Cast ==
- Teresa Saponangelo as Marta
- Vinicio Marchioni as Guido
- Andrea Migliucci as Andrea
- Marina Ferrara
- Gaia Bassi
- Angela Tamburrino
- Valeria Vaiano

== Production ==
Principal photography began on 6 May 2024. The film was shot over five weeks in Naples, specifically in Mergellina, Chiaia, Vomero, and Posillipo.

== Release ==
The film had its world premiere out of competition at the 82nd Venice International Film Festival on 5 September 2025. It received a theatrical release in Italy on 2 October 2025.
