= The Dust of Naples =

- Directed by: Antonio Capuano
- Written by: Antonio Capuano; Paolo Sorrentino; Tonino Taiuti
- Cinematography: Pasquale Rachini
- Edited by: Giogiò Franchini
- Music by: Marco Zurzolo
- Release date: June 1998
- Running time: 100 minutes
- Language: Italian

The Dust of Naples (Italian: Polvere di Napoli) is a 1998 Italian comedy film written and directed by Antonio Capuano. starring Silvio Orlando, Tonino Taiuti, Lola Pagnani. The film was produced by Gianni Minervini, Gian Mario Feletti, Giorgio Magliulo.

== Cast ==
- Silvio Orlando: Ciriaco - Ciarli
- Tonino Taiuti: Gerri
- Lola Pagnani: Rosita
- Teresa Saponangelo: Teresa
- Antonino Iuorio: Bibberò
- Gigio Morra: Bilancione
- Giovanni Esposito: Mimmo
