= Children of the Night (2016 film) =

2016 drama film

- Directed by: Andrea De Sica
- Screenplay by: Andrea De Sica; Mariano Di Nardo; Gloria Malatesta
- Starring: Vincenzo Crea; Ludovico Succio; Fabrizio Rongione
- Cinematography: Stefano Falivene
- Edited by: Alberto Masi
- Music by: Andrea De Sica; Leo Rosi
- Distributed by: 01 Distribution
- Release date: 2016
- Language: Italian

Children of the Night (Italian: I figli della notte) is a 2016 Italian-Belgian drama film co-written and directed by Andrea De Sica, in his feature film debut.

== Cast ==
- Vincenzo Crea as Giulio
- Ludovico Succio as Edoardo
- Fabrizio Rongione as Mathias
- Yuliia Sobol as Elena
- Luigi Bignone as Riccardo

== Release ==
The film premiered in competition at the 34th Torino Film Festival. It was released in Italian cinemas on 31 May 2017.

== Reception ==
For this film De Sica was awarded the Nastro d'Argento Award for Best New Director and received a David di Donatello nomination in the same category.

Paolo Mereghetti described the film as "an unusually harsh film, going against the grain of Italian cinema", which "seeks to offer a wholly unflinching portrait of a youth whose parents are absent [...], left alone to face its own solitude and vulnerabilities".
