= The Spectator (film) =

- Directed by: Paolo Franchi
- Starring: Barbora Bobuľová; Andrea Renzi; Brigitte Catillon
- Cinematography: Giuseppe Lanci
- Music by: Carlo Crivelli
- Release date: 2004
- Running time: 98 minutes
- Country: Italy
- Language: Italian

The Spectator (Italian: La spettatrice) is a 2004 Italian romance-drama film written and directed by Paolo Franchi. It was screened at the 2004 Tribeca Film Festival. The film was paired by several critics with the works by Krzysztof Kieślowski.

== Cast ==
- Barbora Bobuľová - Valeria
- Andrea Renzi - Massimo
- Brigitte Catillon - Flavia
- Chiara Picchi - Sonia
- Matteo Mussoni - Andrea
- Giorgio Podo - Lo conosciuto pub
- Carlotta Centanni - L'agente immobiliare
- Cesare Cremonini - Il gufo

== See also ==
- List of Italian films of 2004
