= Il sindaco del Rione Sanità =

Play written by Eduardo De Filippo

Il sindaco del Rione Sanità ("The Mayor of Rione Sanità", also "The Syndicate") is a play in three acts by Neapolitan screenwriter and actor Eduardo De Filippo. It was written in 1960 and first presented on stage that same year by Eduardo himself, at the Quirino theatre in Rome.

The play is set in Rione Sanità, a well known, degraded neighborhood in Naples. Eduardo has commented that the plot was inspired from a real-life story, and specifically from some "Campoluongo", a furniture-maker who lived in Rione Sanità and was respected by the population as a local authority (i.e., a sort of "Mayor"). Campoluongo was in fact a friend of Eduardo, as well as of a number of other Neapolitan actors, including Totò and Nino Taranto, who reportedly benefited from the "protection" of Campoluongo when filming in Naples. In the play, this character is named "Barracano". Eduardo himself used to play this role on stage.

== Reception and discussion ==
Il sindaco del Rione Sanità was acclaimed by both the audience and the critics, while raising much controversy for its unusual ethical perspective. The main character Barracano is in fact depicted both as a criminal (for example, he doesn't hesitate to threaten to kill another character) and as sincerely committed to applying justice. Some critics have thus interpreted Barracano as essentially a Camorra boss or a "Godfather", and have expressed perplexity over the ambiguous representation of this character as "good". Others have noted that a correct interpretation of the character must take into account Eduardo's pessimistic view on the Italian and Neapolitan judicial system and society, as well as the wide differences between the Neapolitan society described by Eduardo and that of modern Camorra. Barracano's moral system is not in direct contrast with the law per se; rather, he is driven by the belief that while, in theory, "the law is meant for good", nevertheless in practice "men eat each other", and the poor and downtrodden are doomed to be mistreated, rather than protected, by the judicial system. For what concerns the identification of Barracano's alternative moral system with the Camorra honor code, Eduardo denied that Campoluongo/Barracano was a Camorrist; he was rather a Mammasantissima, i.e., someone who lived outside legality (a guappo) but that the people would call for to be protected from injustice.

== Adaptations ==
The original play starring Eduardo as Barracano was both presented in theatres and aired on Italian television (in 1964). Since then, it has been played on stage by a number of theatrical companies, including that of Carlo Giuffrè, longtime partner of Eduardo. A film adaptation entitled The Mayor was produced in 1996, starring Anthony Quinn in the role of Barracano; the story differs from the original play in a few respects, most notably for being set in the United States instead of Naples and for Barracano being unequivocally depicted as a Mafia "Godfather". The 2012 Chichester Festival Theatre revival of the play as The Syndicate featured Ian McKellen as the Neapolitan godfather.

In 2019, Mario Martone directed a film adaptation of the play, titled The Mayor of Rione Sanità.
