= Red Moon (2001 film) =

2001 film by Antonio Capuano

- Directed by: Antonio Capuano
- Written by: Antonio Capuano
- Produced by: Andrea De Liberato
- Cinematography: Tommaso Borgstrom
- Edited by: Giogiò Franchini
- Music by: Lelio De Tullio
- Release date: 2001
- Running time: 116 minutes
- Country: Italy
- Language: Italian

Red Moon (Italian: Luna rossa) is a 2001 Italian crime-drama film written and directed by Antonio Capuano. It entered the competition at the 58th Venice International Film Festival.

== Cast ==
- Carlo Cecchi as Antonino
- Licia Maglietta as Irene
- Toni Servillo as Amerigo
- Italo Celoro as Tony
- Domenico Balsamo as Oreste
- Antonia Truppo as Orsola
- Antonino Iuorio as Egidio
- Valeria Vaiano as Woman clan
- Lucia Ragni as Rita
- Susy Del Giudice as Elena
- Angela Pagano as Mariella
- Antonio Pennarella as Libero
- Stefania De Francesco as Libero's wife
- Luca Riemma as Frank
