= Bloody Richard =

Riccardo va all'inferno
- Theatrical release poster
- Directed by: Roberta Torre
- Screenplay by: Valerio Bariletti; Roberta Torre
- Based on: Richard III by William Shakespeare
- Produced by: Paolo Guerra
- Starring: Massimo Ranieri; Sonia Bergamasco
- Cinematography: Matteo Cocco
- Edited by: Giogiò Franchini
- Production companies: Agidi Srl; Rosebud Entertainment Pictures
- Distributed by: Medusa Film
- Release date: 27 November 2017
- Running time: 91 minutes
- Country: Italy
- Language: Italian

Bloody Richard (Italian: Riccardo va all'inferno, lit. 'Richard goes to hell') is a 2017 Italian musical drama film directed by Roberta Torre, starring Massimo Ranieri and inspired on William Shakespeare's Richard III.

The film has been presented out of competition at the 35th Turin Film Festival.

== Plot ==
Riccardo Mancini leaves a psychiatric hospital where he spent long years due to a mysterious crime. He is determined to take revenge and conquer power within his underworld family; he will have no qualms about getting rid of his brothers and those who hinder his path and he will do so by singing.

== Cast ==
- Massimo Ranieri as Riccardo Mancini
- Sonia Bergamasco as The Queen Mother
- Silvia Gallerano as Betta Mancini
- Ivan Franěk as Romolo Lo Zingaro (The Gypsy)
- Tommaso Ragno as Edoardo Mancini La Jena (The Hyena)
