= Awa Ly =

French singer (born 1977)

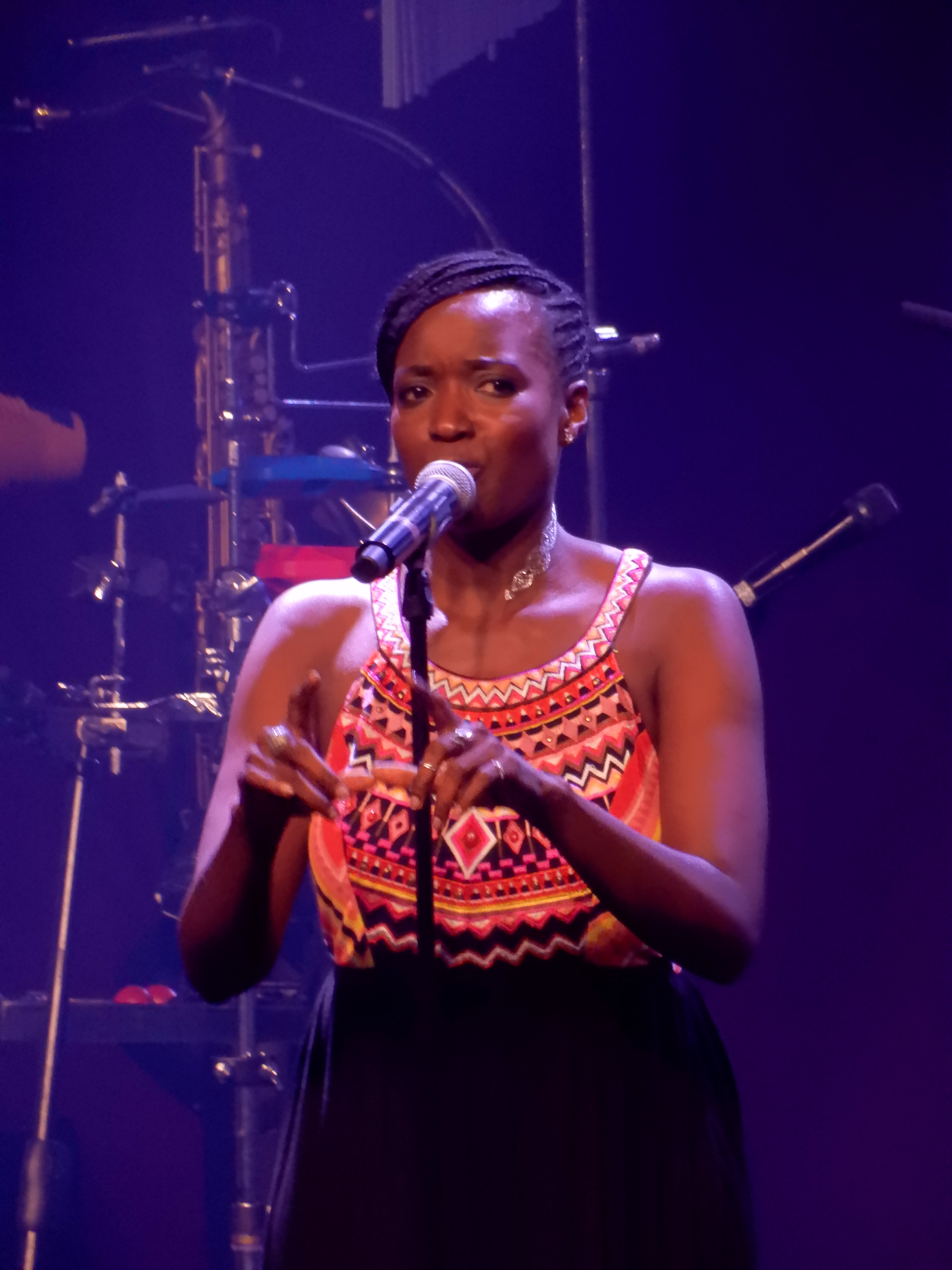

Background information
- Born: January 4, 1977 (age 49); Paris, France
- Genres: Soul; pop; folk; jazz
- Occupations: Singer; songwriter
- Years active: 2008–present
- Label: Rising Bird
- Website: awalymusic.com

Awa Ly (born 4 January 1977) is a French singer, songwriter, and actress of Senegalese origin who lives in Rome, Italy. She has released three studio albums, Modulated (2009), Five and a Feather (2016), and Safe and Sound (2020). As an actress, she played in several movies, including Black and White (2008), La nostra vita (2010), and Escort in Love (2011).

== Biography ==
Awa Ly was born and raised in Paris. Her parents are from Senegal and most of her family lives in Dakar. She currently lives in Rome and works as an actress, singer and songwriter.

Ly's debut studio album, Modulated, was released in 2009.

In 2011, Ly played in the Italian film Escort in Love by Daniele Luchetti besides Paola Cortellesi, Raoul Bova and Rocco Papaleo.

She accompanied Pino Daniele in summer 2013 on an international tour after having already performed with him in the United States and Canada.

Ly has previously used My Major Company, a fan-funded music label in France, and for finishing her five-track EP, which was recorded at Funkhaus in Berlin in December 2013, she was seeking funding via the French crowdfunding platform KissKissBankBank. The self-titled EP was released in 2014.

On March 25, 2016, Ly released her second full-length studio album, Five and a Feather.

On March 20, 2020, Ly released her third studio album, Safe and Sound.

== Filmography ==
Year	Title	Role(s)	Notes
2008	Black and White	Veronique	
2009	The Front Line	Jazz singer	Cameo appearance
2010	La nostra vita	Celeste	
2010	20 Cigarettes	Nurse	Cameo appearance
2011	Escort in Love	Abeba	
2015	Anna e Yusef	Karima	Television movie
2017	The Bastards of Pizzofalcone	Maman	Episode: "Misericordia"
2017	Fortunata	Nun	Uncredited
2019	Scappo a casa	Jamilah	
2020	The Time of Indifference	Marame	

== Discography ==
=== Studio albums ===
- 2009: Modulated
- 2016: Five and a Feather
- 2020: Safe and Sound

=== EPs ===
- 2011: Parole Prestate
- 2014: Awa Ly

=== Singles ===
- 2015: "Let Me Love You"
- 2019: "Close Your Eyes"
- 2020: "Mesmerizing"
