= Matteo Cocco =

Italian cinematographer (born 1985)

- Born: 29 December 1985 (age 40); Tuscany, Italy
- Occupation: Cinematographer
- Years active: 2003-present

Matteo Cocco (born 29 December 1985) is an Italian cinematographer.

== Life and career ==
Born in Tuscany, Cocco grew up in Rome. Between 2005 and 2008, he studied cinematography at the Centro Sperimentale di Cinematografia. In 2008, in search of better job opportunities he moved to Germany, where his career had a breakout thanks to his work in Philip Gröning's award-winning film The Police Officer's Wife.

In 2016, Cocco received a Nastro d'Argento nomination for his work in Per amor vostro and Pericle. Thanks to his cinematography in Giorgio Diritti's 2020 film Hidden Away, he won a David di Donatello for Best Cinematography, a European Film Award for Best Cinematographer, and a Globo d'oro.

== Selected filmography ==
- The Police Officer's Wife (2013)
- Per amor vostro (2015)
- Pericle (2016)
- Il colore nascosto delle cose (2017)
- Bloody Richard (2017)
- On My Skin (2018)
- Roads (2019)
- Hidden Away (2020)
- Exile (2020)
- Dark Glasses (2022)
- Cold Copy (2023)
- My Tennis Maestro (2025)
- Hungry Bird (2025)
- The Weight (2026)
- Masterplan (2026)
