= The Nymph =

- Directed by: Lina Wertmüller
- Screenplay by: Ugo Pirro; Lina Wertmüller
- Based on: Ninfa plebea by Domenico Rea
- Produced by: Ciro Ippolito; Fulvio Lucisano
- Starring: Lucia Cara; Raoul Bova; Stefania Sandrelli
- Cinematography: Ennio Guarnieri
- Edited by: Pierluigi Leonardi
- Music by: Ennio Morricone
- Release date: 1996
- Country: Italy

Ninfa plebea, internationally released as The Nymph, is a 1996 Italian comedy-drama film directed by Lina Wertmüller. It is based on the Strega Prize winning novel of the same name by Domenico Rea.

== Plot ==
During World War II, Miluzza, a sensual adolescent girl comes of age in a small Southern Italian village.

== Cast ==
- Lucia Cara as Miluzza
- Raoul Bova as Pietro
- Stefania Sandrelli as Nunziata
- Isa Danieli as Gesummia
- Peppe De Rosa as Don Peppe
- Lorenzo Crespi as Dino
- Simona Patitucci as Rosinella
- Giuditta del Vecchio as Annuzza
- Lola Pagnani as Lucia
