= Rehearsals for War =

1998 film

- Film poster
- Directed by: Mario Martone
- Written by: Mario Martone
- Produced by: Angelo Curti; Andrea Occhipinti; Kermit Smith
- Starring: Andrea Renzi
- Cinematography: Pasquale Mari
- Edited by: Jacopo Quadri
- Release date: 15 September 1998
- Running time: 113 minutes
- Country: Italy
- Language: Italian

Rehearsals for War (Italian: Teatro di guerra) is a 1998 Italian drama film directed by Mario Martone. It was screened in the Un Certain Regard section at the 1998 Cannes Film Festival.

== Cast ==
- Andrea Renzi - Leo
- Iaia Forte - Luisella Cielo
- Maurizio Bizzi - Maurizio
- Salvatore Cantalupo - Rosario
- Antonello Cossia - Antonello
- Francesca Cutolo - Francesca
- Giovanna Giuliani - Giovanna
- Vincenzo Saggese - Vincenzo
- Lucia Vitrone - Lucia
- Roberto De Francesco - Diego
- Marco Baliani - Vittorio
- Nina Di Majo - Giornalista
- Beniamino Femiano - Varriale
- Tatà Donnabella - Capo redattore
- Toni Servillo - Franco Turco
- Anna Bonaiuto - Sara Cataldi
