= Lorenzo Crespi =

Italian actor (born 1971)

- Born: Vincenzo Leopizzi; 13 August 1971 (age 54); Messina, Italy
- Occupation: Actor

Lorenzo Crespi (born Vincenzo Leopizzi on 13 August 1971) is an Italian actor.

== Life and career ==
Born in Messina, Crespi made his film debut in 1995, in Pappi Corsicato's Black Holes. He later went on to work with director Dario Argento in The Stendhal Syndrome.

In 1998, he won the Globo d'oro for best breakthrough actor for his performance in Porzûs. In 2007, Crespi starred in the television series Gente di mare.

== Selected filmography ==
=== Film ===
- Black Holes (1995)
- The Stendhal Syndrome (1995)
- The Nymph (1996)
- Marianna Ucrìa (1997)
- Porzûs (1997)
- Un Hada (2016)

=== Television ===
- Il ritorno di Sandokan – miniserie TV, 4 episodi (1996)
- The Return of Sandokan (TV, 1996)
- La principessa e il povero – film TV (1997)
- Operazione Odissea – film TV (1999)
- Donne di mafia – film TV (2001)
- Carabinieri (TV, 2002 – 2003)
- Gente di mare (TV, 2005 – 2007)
- Imperium: Pompeii (TV, 2007)
- Mogli a pezzi – serie TV (2008)
- Vita da paparazzo – film TV (2008)
