= Andrea Renzi (actor) =

Italian actor

- Born: Andrea Renzi; 7 February 1963 (age 63); Rome, Italy
- Occupations: Actor; filmmaker
- Years active: 1992–present
- Height: 1.75 m (5 ft 9 in)

Andrea Renzi is an Italian actor. He has performed in more than 20 films since 1992.

== Selected filmography ==
Film
Year	Title	Role	Notes
1992	Death of a Neapolitan Mathematician	Leo	
1998	Rehearsals for War	Leo	
2001	The Ignorant Fairies	Massimo	
2001	One Man Up	Antonio Pisapia	
2003	The Cruelest Day	Francesco	
2004	The Spectator	Massimo	
2005	The Tiger and the Snow	Dr. Guzzelli	
2006	Don't Make Any Plans for Tonight	Alessandro	
2008	Parlami d'amore	Lorenzo	
2010	We Believed	Sigismondo Castromediano	
2011	Mozzarella Stories	Accountant	
2013	Long Live Freedom	De Bellis	
2015	WAX: We Are the X	Saverio	
20022	Dry	President	
