= Dark Love (film) =

2010 film

- Film poster
- Italian: L'amore buio
- Directed by: Antonio Capuano
- Starring: Irene De Angelis; Gabriele Agrio; Luisa Ranieri; Corso Salani; Valeria Golino; Anna Ammirati
- Cinematography: Tommaso Borgstrom
- Edited by: Giogiò Franchini
- Music by: Pasquale Catalano
- Release dates: September 2, 2010 (Venice Film Festival); September 3, 2010 (Italy)
- Running time: 110 minutes
- Language: Italian

Dark Love (Italian: L'amore buio) is a 2010 Italian drama film directed by Antonio Capuano. It premiered out of competition at the 67th Venice International Film Festival.

== Plot ==
Irene (De Angelis) is a well-to-do young woman who is gang-raped by a quartet of thuggish Neapolitan teenage boys. One of them, Ciro (Agrio) begins a correspondence with her after his conviction, as both victim and victimiser seek catharsis through artistic expression.

== Cast ==
- Irene De Angelis: Irene
- Gabriele Agrio: Ciro
- Luisa Ranieri: Mother of Irene
- Corso Salani: Father of Irene
- Valeria Golino: Prison psychologist
- Anna Ammirati: Irene's analyst
- Fabrizio Gifuni: Psychotherapist
