= Medea Miracle =

2007 film

- Directed by: Tonino De Bernardi
- Produced by: Ronald Chammah; Tonino De Bernardi
- Starring: Isabelle Huppert; Tommaso Ragno
- Cinematography: Tommaso Borgstrom
- Edited by: Pietro Lassandro
- Release date: 2007
- Running time: 81 minutes
- Countries: France; Italy
- Language: French

Medea Miracle (French: Médée Miracle) is a 2007 French-Italian drama film directed by Tonino De Bernardi and starring Isabelle Huppert and Tommaso Ragno.

== Cast ==
- Julia Camps - Girl
- Eugenia Capizzano - Medea employed
- Lou Castel - Creo
- Rossella Dassu - Louise
- Giulietta De Bernardi - Martha
- Maria de Medeiros - Medea's friend
- Isabelle Huppert - Irène / Médée
- Teresa Momo - Girl
- Tommaso Ragno - Jason
- Isabelle Ruth - Homeless woman
- Marco Sgrosso - Absirtho

== See also ==
- Isabelle Huppert on screen and stage
