= Miele (film) =

2013 film

- Film poster
- Directed by: Valeria Golino
- Written by: Francesca Marciano; Valeria Golino; Valia Santella
- Based on: novel A nome tuo by Mauro Covacich
- Produced by: Viola Prestieri; Riccardo Scamarcio
- Starring: Jasmine Trinca; Carlo Cecchi; Libero De Rienzo; Vinicio Marchioni; Iaia Forte; Roberto De Francesco
- Cinematography: Gergely Pohárnok
- Edited by: Giogiò Franchini
- Distributed by: BIM Distribuzione (Italy)
- Release date: 1 May 2013
- Running time: 96 minutes
- Country: Italy
- Language: Italian

Miele is a 2013 Italian drama film directed by Valeria Golino. It was screened in the Un Certain Regard section at the 2013 Cannes Film Festival where it won a commendation from the Ecumenical Jury. It was also nominated for the 2013 Lux Prize.

== Cast ==
- Jasmine Trinca as Irene/Miele
- Carlo Cecchi as Carlo Grimaldi
- Libero De Rienzo as Rocco
- Vinicio Marchioni as Stefano
- Iaia Forte as Clelia
- Roberto De Francesco as Filippo
- Barbara Ronchi as Sandra
- Massimiliano Iacolucci as Irene's father
- Claudio Guain as Ennio
- Valeria Bilello as Irene's mother

== Reception ==
=== Critical response ===
Miele has an approval rating of 100% on review aggregator website Rotten Tomatoes, based on 16 reviews, and an average rating of 7.5/10. Metacritic assigned the film a weighted average score of 75 out of 100, based on 7 critics, indicating generally favorable reviews.

=== Accolades ===
List of Accolades
Award / Film Festival	Category	Recipient(s)	Result
67th Nastri d'Argento	Best New Director	Valeria Golino	Won
67th Nastri d'Argento	Best Producer	Riccardo Scamarcio and Viola Prestieri	Nominated
67th Nastri d'Argento	Best Actress	Jasmine Trinca	Won
67th Nastri d'Argento	Best Supporting Actor	Carlo Cecchi	Nominated
67th Nastri d'Argento	Best Editing	Giogiò Franchini	Nominated
67th Nastri d'Argento	Best Sound	Emanuele Cecere	Won
66th Cannes Film Festival	Un Certain Regard Award	Valeria Golino	Nominated
66th Cannes Film Festival	Prize of the Ecumenical Jury - Special Mention	Valeria Golino	Won
59th David di Donatello Awards
59th David di Donatello Awards	Best New Director	Valeria Golino	Nominated
59th David di Donatello Awards	Best Script	Francesca Marciano, Valia Santella & Valeria Golino	Nominated
59th David di Donatello Awards	Best Producer	Riccardo Scamarcio and Viola Prestieri	Nominated
59th David di Donatello Awards	Best Actor	Carlo Cecchi	Nominated
59th David di Donatello Awards	Best Actress	Jasmine Trinca	Nominated
59th David di Donatello Awards	Best Cinematography	Gergely Poharnok	Nominated
59th David di Donatello Awards	Best Editing	Giogiò Franchini	Nominated
53rd Italian Golden Globe
53rd Italian Golden Globe	Best First Feature	Valeria Golino	Won
53rd Italian Golden Globe	Best Actress	Jasmine Trinca	Won
