= Massimiliano Gallo =

Italian actor and singer (born 1968)

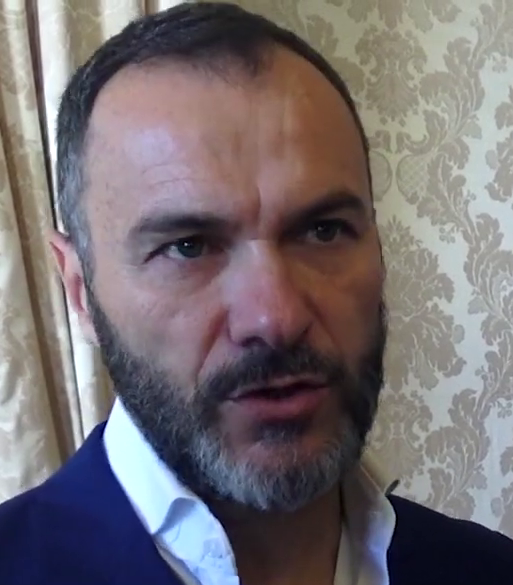
- Born: 19 June 1968 (age 57); Naples, Campania, Italy
- Occupation(s): Actor, singer
- Years active: 1973–present
- Height: 1.75 m (5 ft 9 in)

Massimiliano Gallo (born 19 June 1968) is an Italian actor and singer.

== Biography ==
Son of singer Nunzio Gallo, he made his debut in theater at the age of five and was the star of several TV series for children shot for RAI. In 1988 he founded, together with his brother Gianfranco, the theatrical "Gallo Company."

After more than 35 years on stage, Gallo debuted on movie screens in 2008, directed by his friend and colleague Vincenzo Salemme. During the following years he worked with directors like Ferzan Özpetek, Marco Risi and Maria Sole Tognazzi. He also took part in Paolo Sorrentino's series The Young Pope.

In 2017 he lent his voice to the vicious druglord Salvatore Lo Giusto in the animated film Cinderella the Cat.

== Filmography ==
=== Film ===
Year	Title	Role(s)	Notes
2008	No Problem	Salvatore	
2009	Fort Apache Napoli	Valentino Gionta	
2010	Loose Cannons	Salvatore	
2011	Mozzarella Stories	Angelo Tatangelo	
2011	Kryptonite!	Arturo	
2012	Magnificent Presence	Dr. Cuccurullo	
2013	La santa	Agostino	
2013	L'ultimo goal	Gerardo	
2013	Neve	Gaetano	
2014	Perez.	Luca Buglione	
2015	Si accettano miracoli	Galliano	
2015	Burning Love	Father Ciro	
2015	Me, Myself and Her	Stefano	
2015	Per amor vostro	Luigi Scaglione	
2015	Effetti indesiderati	Ciro La Vecchia	
2015	Babbo Natale non viene da nord	The Doctor	
2016	Onda su onda	Chief De Lorenzo	
2016	Zeta: A Hip Hop Story	Massimiliano De Simone	
2017	Vieni a vivere a Napoli	Angelo	
2017	The Startup	Remo Achilli	
2017	La parrucchiera	Salvatore	
2017	Cinderella the Cat	Salvatore Lo Giusto (voice)	Voice role
2017	Nato a Casal di Principe	Arturo	
2017	Veleno	Cosimo Cardano	
2017	Metti una notte	Vincenzo Cafoni	
2018	Reckless	Captain Greppi	
2018	Una festa esagerata	Lello	
2018	Bob & Marys	Lawyer Aiello	
2018	We'll Be Young and Beautiful	Umberto	
2019	The Mayor of Rione Sanità	Arturo Santaniello	
2019	Pinocchio	Crow / Circus Owner / Mastiff #1	
2020	7 ore per farti innamorare	Alfonso	
2020	Villetta con ospiti	Inspector Carmine Panti	
2020	The Players	Massimiliano	
2021	The Hand of God	Franco	
2021	Il silenzio grande	Valerio Primic	
2022	Jumping from High Places	Paolo	
2024	Vanished into the Night	Nicola	

=== Television ===
Year	Title	Role(s)	Notes
2005	Cefalonia	Lattanzio	Television movie
2011	The Secret of Water	Romano Gruglio	Main role
2012	Il generale dei briganti	Giacinto Albini	Television movie
2013	Il clan dei camorristi	Antonio Vescia	Main role
2013	Volare: La grande storia di Domenico Modugno	Giuseppe Gramitto	Docuseries
2013	Benvenuti a tavola	Peppe	Episode: "La trappola"
2013	Un caso di coscienza	Carmine Di Matteo	Episode: "Un figlio da amare"
2014	Per amore del mio popolo	Father Antonio Esposito	Television movie
2015	Una grande famiglia	Domenico Salsano	Recurring role (season 3)
2016	The Young Pope	Captain Becchi	Episode: "Episodio 6"
2017	Sirens	Carmine Gargiulo	Main role
2017–2023	The Bastards of Pizzofalcone	Luigi Palma	Main role
2019	Figli del destino	Policeman	Television movie
2019–present	Imma Tataranni: Deputy Prosecutor	Pietro De Ruggeri	Main role
2022	Filumena Marturano	Domenico Soriano	Television movie
2022–present	Vincenzo Malinconico, Unsuccessful Lawyer	Vincenzo Malinconico	Lead role
2023	Napoli milionaria!	Gennaro Jovine	Television movie
2024	These Ghosts!	Pasquale Lojacono	Television movie

== Awards and nominations ==
Year	Award	Category	Work	Result	Ref.
2023	Ciak d'Oro Serie TV	Best Italian Actor	Vincenzo Malinconico, avvocato d’insuccesso	Nominated	
