= Death of a Neapolitan Mathematician =

- Directed by: Mario Martone
- Written by: Mario Martone; Fabrizia Ramondino
- Produced by: Angelo Curti; Antonietta De Lillo; Giorgio Magliulo
- Starring: Carlo Cecchi; Anna Bonaiuto; Renato Carpentieri; Toni Servillo; Antonio Neiwiller; Licia Maglietta
- Cinematography: Luca Bigazzi
- Edited by: Jacopo Quadri
- Music by: Michele Campanella
- Distributed by: Radiotelevisione Italiana
- Release date: 8 September 1992
- Running time: 108 minutes
- Country: Italy
- Language: Italian

Death of a Neapolitan Mathematician (Italian: Morte di un matematico napoletano) is a 1992 Italian drama film, written and directed by Mario Martone.

The film earned nine awards and was nominated for two, with director and writer Mario Martone winning seven awards.

== Cast ==
- Carlo Cecchi as Renato Caccioppoli
- Anna Bonaiuto as Anna
- Renato Carpentieri as Luigi Caccioppoli
- Toni Servillo as Pietro
- Licia Maglietta as Emilia
- Antonio Neiwiller as Don Simplicio
- Andrea Renzi as Leo
- Alessandra D'Elia as Stella
- Roberto De Francesco as Leonardo
- Lucio Amelio as the Marquis
- Toni Bertorelli as Antonio Alcamo
- Antonino Iuorio as Ferdinando
- Patrizio Rispo as Stefanini
- Sergio Solli as the Magistrate
- Enzo Moscato as Biondino
- Vincenzo Salemme as Communist Party militant
- Nicola Di Pinto as Communist Party leader

== Awards ==
=== Won ===
- 49th Venice International Film Festival 1992:
  - Grand Special Jury Prize – Mario Martone
  - Kodak Cinecritica Award – Mario Martone
  - Pasinetti Award – Best Actor: Carlo Cecchi
- Angers European First Film Festival 1993:
  - C.I.C.A.E. Award – Mario Martone
  - European Jury Award – Feature Film: Mario Martone
  - SACD Grand Prize – Mario Martone
- David di Donatello Awards 1993:
  - David Award – Best New Director: Mario Martone
  - Special David Award – Carlo Cecchi
- Italian National Syndicate of Film Journalists 1993:
  - Silver Ribbon Award – Best New Director: Mario Martone

=== Nominated ===
- European Film Awards 1993:
  - European Film Award – Best Actor: Carlo Cecchi
- Italian National Syndicate of Film Journalists 1993:
  - Silver Ribbon – Best Actor: Carlo Cecchi
