= Vito and the Others =

1991 drama film

- Directed by: Antonio Capuano
- Screenplay by: Antonio Capuano
- Starring: Nando Triola
- Cinematography: Antonio Baldoni
- Edited by: Valentina Migliaccio
- Release date: 1991
- Country: Italy
- Language: Italian

Vito and the Others (Italian: Vito e gli altri) is a 1991 Italian crime drama film written and directed by Antonio Capuano. It premiered at the 48th Venice International Film Festival.

== Cast ==
- Nando Triola as Vito
- Giovanni Bruno as Gaetano
- Rosaria De Cicco as Aunt Rosetta
- Mario Lenti as Aniello
- Pina Leone as Miriam
- Giuseppina Fusco as Alba
- Antonio Iaccarino as Formaggino

== Production ==
The screenplay of the film won the 1988 Solinas Prize. It had a budget of 400 millions lire.

== Release ==
The film had its world premiere at the 48th edition of the Venice Film Festival, in the Venice International Film Critics' Week competition sidebar, in which it won the Kodak-Cinecritica Prize.

== Reception ==
La Repubblica's film critic Callisto Cosulich praised the film, comparing it to Marco Risi's Boys on the Outside but "allergic to any sociological instance", and noting that its very low budget ultimately worked in its favor, as "had it been more polished and technically accomplished, might have risked slipping into outright sensationalism." Leonardo Autera from Corriere della Sera also lauded the film, calling it "an exemplary demonstration of a style, unconstrained by preconceived schemes yet cohesive and rich in expressiveness", showcasing Capuano's "command of unusual expressive means that extend well beyond mere experimentation."

For this film Capuano won the Nastro d'Argento for Best New Director.
