= Domenico Rea =

Italian writer (1921–1994)

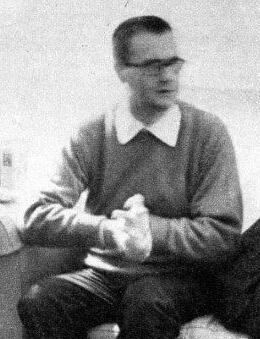
- Born: 8 September 1921; Naples, Italy
- Died: 26 January 1994 (aged 72); Naples, Italy
- Occupation: Writer

Domenico Rea (8 September 1921 – 26 January 1994) was an Italian writer and journalist.

== Life and career ==
Born in Naples, the son of a carabiniere and a midwife, Rea grew up in Nocera Inferiore, and in 1940, he penned the preface to a volume of verses of the Franciscan friar Angelo Iovino, his first published work. He made his debut as journalist in the weekly magazine Il Popolo fascista. After the war, he became a local secretary of the Italian Communist Party, and obtained a diploma from the Istituto Magistrale. After releasing his first novella, La figlia di Casimiro Clarus (1945), and a collection of short stories, Spaccanapoli (1947), he moved to Campinas, in the state of São Paulo. Returned to Naples in 1949, he had his breakout with the collection of short stories Gesù, fate luce, which won the Viareggio Prize and placed second at the Strega Prize. Following the violent suppression of the Hungarian Revolution of 1956, Rea left the Italian Communist Party and departed from Paese Sera, subsequently starting to collaborate with other newspapers, notably Corriere della sera.

In 1959, Rea released his first novel, Una vampata di rossore, inspired by the last days of his sick mother. At the beginning of the 1970s, he started collaborating with RAI and became theatre critic for Il Mattino. After numerous collection of short stories, essays, and two stage plays, in 1992, he released his second novel Ninfa plebea, which won the Strega Prize and was adapted into a film with the same title by Lina Wertmüller. After suffering a stroke on 8 January 1994, he died on 26 January, at the age of 72.
