= Appassionate =

1999 musical drama film

- Directed by: Tonino De Bernardi
- Screenplay by: Tonino De Bernardi; Mario Sesti
- Produced by: Donatella Palermo
- Starring: Anna Bonaiuto; Inês de Medeiros; Iaia Forte; Galatea Ranzi; Isabel Ruth
- Cinematography: Tommaso Borgstrom
- Edited by: Fiorella Giovannelli
- Music by: Nuccio Tortora
- Release date: 1999
- Language: Italian

Appassionate (lit. 'Passionate'), also known as Appassionata, is a 1999 Italian musical drama film co-written and directed by Tonino De Bernardi. It premiered into the main competition at the 56th Venice International Film Festival.

== Cast ==
- Anna Bonaiuto as Maddalena
- Inês de Medeiros as Madonna
- Iaia Forte as Rosa
- Galatea Ranzi as Caterina
- Isabel Ruth as Pina
- Salvatore Cantalupo as Oreste
- Carlo Cecchi as padre
- Roberto De Francesco as Michele
- James Thierrée as Joel
- Filippo Timi as Ricky
