= Black and White (2008 Italian film) =

- Theatrical release poster
- Italian: Bianco e nero
- Directed by: Cristina Comencini
- Written by: Cristina Comencini; Giulia Calenda
- Starring: Fabio Volo; Ambra Angiolini; Aïssa Maïga; Eriq Ebouaney; Anna Bonaiuto; Franco Branciaroli; Teresa Saponangelo; Katia Ricciarelli
- Cinematography: Fabio Cianchetti
- Edited by: Cecilia Zanuso
- Release date: 7 March 2008
- Running time: 100 minutes
- Country: Italy
- Language: Italian
- Box office: $8,096,913

Black and White (Italian: Bianco e nero) is a 2008 Italian romantic comedy-drama film directed by Cristina Comencini. The film deals with race and inter-racial relationships when the married Carlo (Fabio Volo) falls in love with Nadine, the wife of his own wife's colleague.

== Plot ==
Carlo Lodoli is a young computer technician, married to Elena, a cultural mediator. The couple have a daughter named Giovanna. One night at an information evening hosted by Elena's work, Carlo walks outside to smoke in the night air in the middle of the talk, when he meets Nadine, a beautiful, rebellious woman and the wife of Elena's colleague Bertrand, from Senegal. As the pair talk outside, Carlo slowly begins to fall in love with Nadine. He then discovers through Elena, that Bertrand is Nadine's husband. After Carlo and Elena visit and talk to Nadine at the Senegalese embassy, where she works, Carlo suggests to Elena that they invite Nadine and her two children, Felicite and Christian, to Giovanna's birthday party, which she reluctantly agrees to. During the party, Carlo becomes fixated by Nadine, who also begins having feelings for Carlo, when he frequently comes to her rescue when Elena's father Alphonse repeatedly attempts to flirt with her. Later on having established their attraction for one another, Nadine asks Carlo to repair her computer in order to maintain contact. She arrives at Carlo's repair shop, where subtle hints that they are in love with each other emerge while Carlo looks at her computer. Eventually, one day when Elena and Bertrand are away on a business trip, Carlo calls over to Nadine's house to repair her computer. When Carlo leaves, he suddenly knocks on the door and is invited in by Nadine. The pair then make love in Nadine's living room, and begin an affair. When their respective spouses discover the affair however, Carlo and Nadine are ejected from their homes. Carlo goes to live with his mother while Nadine is placed in the storage area of an apartment for women run by her sister Veronique. A few weeks later, Nadine calls to Carlo's computer shop, looking to pay for her computer, but Carlo's co-worker Dante reveals to her that Carlo was evicted by Elena, causing her to become angry and ranting to Dante about her situation from the affair. When Carlo, who has been trying to reconcile with Elena, is informed through a phone call by Dante that Nadine had called to his shop earlier and still thinks of him, he hurries to the Senegalese embassy to see Nadine again. Despite initial tension, Carlo and Nadine walk outside the embassy, confessing their feeling and begin kissing again. They then return to Nadine's new apartment, have sex, laugh and kiss each other. Carlo and Nadine then continue to see each other. However, after pressures from their respective races, Carlo and Nadine eventually return to their respective spouses. Sometime later, however, Carlo and Nadine meet again by chance at their old lovers rendezvous spot. Realising that they still love each other, Carlo and Nadine decide to remain together, despite the consequences they know they will face. The film ends as Carlo and Nadine embrace and kiss each other in the middle of the park next to a church, symbolising their commitment to stay one another. They subsequently divorce their spouses and begin their new relationship together.

== Cast ==
- Fabio Volo as Carlo
- Ambra Angiolini as Elena
- Aïssa Maïga as Nadine
- Eriq Ebouaney as Bertrand
- Katia Ricciarelli as Olga
- Anna Bonaiuto as Adua
- Franco Branciaroli as Alfonso
- Teresa Saponangelo as Esmeralda
- Billo Thiernothian as Ahamdou
- Awa Ly as Veronique
- Bob Messini as Dante

== See also ==
- Movies about immigration to Italy
