= Gente di mare (TV series) =

- Starring: Lorenzo Crespi; Vanessa Gravina; Fabio Fulco; Antonio Milo
- Country of origin: Italy
- No. of seasons: 2
- No. of episodes: 51

Original release
- Network: Rai 1
- Release: 2005 – 2007

Gente di mare (Seafarers or People of the Sea) is an Italian television series.

== Series premise ==
A young Italian naval officer, Angelo Sammarco, is transferred to Calabria, Italy, where he works with the men and women of the Tropea Coast Guard.

== Cast ==
- Lorenzo Crespi as Angelo Sammarco
- Vanessa Gravina as Margherita Scanò
- Patrizio Rispo as Giacomo Onorato
- Mirco Petrini as Salvatore Terrasini
- Fabio Fulco as Davide Ruggeri
- Frank Crudele as Pietro Melluso
- Antonio Milo as Sante Lo Foco
- Giada Desideri as Elena Dapporto
- Myriam Catania as Gloria Lo Bianco
- Alessandro Lucente as Paolo Zannoni
- Davide Ricci as Luca Rebecchi
- Chiara Francini as Marzia Meniconi
- Cosimo Cinieri as Luigi Cordari
- Eros Pagni as Carmine Amitrano
- Rosa Pianeta as Viviana Amitrano
- Tiziana Lodato as Sofia Amitrano
- Angelo Infanti as Franco Leonetti
- Francesca Chillemi as Verna Leonetti

== See also ==
- List of Italian television series
