= Black Holes (film) =

- Directed by: Pappi Corsicato
- Cinematography: Italo Petriccione
- Music by: Pappi Corsicato
- Release date: 1995
- Running time: 92 minutes
- Country: Italy
- Language: Italian

Black Holes (Italian: I buchi neri) is a 1995 Italian romance film directed by Pappi Corsicato.

== Cast ==
- Iaia Forte as Angela
- Vincenzo Peluso as Adamo
- Manuela Arcuri as Adelaide
- Lorenzo Crespi as Adelmo
- Tosca D'Aquino as Donna dei panni
- Ninni Bruschetta as Client
