= Rossana Campo =

Italian writer and painter

- Born: 17 October 1963 (age 62); Genoa, Italy
- Education: University of Genoa
- Occupations: Novelist; essayist; painter
- Writing career
- Notable work: In principio erano le mutande (1992)

Rossana Campo (born 17 October 1963 in Genoa, Italy) is an Italian writer and painter. She is of Neapolitan descent.

== Bibliography ==
- In principio erano le mutande, ("In the beginning were the pants"), Feltrinelli, Milan, 1992.
- Il pieno di super ("Premium gasoline full tank"), Feltrinelli, Milan, 1993.
- Mai sentita così bene ("Never felt so good"), Feltrinelli, Milan, 1995.
- L'Attore americano, ("The American actor"), Feltrinelli, Milan, 1997.
- Il Matrimonio di Maria, ("Maria's wedding"), Feltrinelli, Milan, 1998.
- Mentre la mia bella dorme ("While my beauty sleeps"), Feltrinelli, Milan, 1999.
- Sono pazza di te ("Mad about you"), Feltrinelli, Milan, 2001.
- L'Uomo che non ho sposato ("The man I didn't marry"), Feltrinelli, Milan, 2003.
- Duro come l'amore ("Hard as love"), Feltrinelli, Milan, 2005.
- Più forte di me ("Can't help it"), Feltrinelli, Milan, 2007.
- Lezioni di arabo ("Arabic lessons"), Feltrinelli, Milan, 2010.
- Felice per quello che sei. Confessioni di una buddista emotiva, Giulio Perrone editore, Rome, 2012.
- Il posto delle donne ("The place of women"), Ponte alle Grazie, Florence, 2013.
- Piccoli Budda, Gallucci, Rome, 2013
- Fare l'amore ("Making love"), Ponte alle Grazie, Florence, 2014.
