= Porzûs =

- Directed by: Renzo Martinelli
- Written by: Renzo Martinelli; Furio Scarpelli
- Cinematography: Giuliano Giustini
- Music by: Flavio Colusso
- Distributed by: Compagnia Distribuzione Internazionale; Buena Vista International
- Release date: 1997
- Country: Italy
- Language: Italian

Porzûs (also spelled Porzus) is a 1997 Italian historical war-drama film written and directed by Renzo Martinelli. For his performance in this film Lorenzo Crespi won the Globo d'oro for best breakthrough actor, while Gastone Moschin was nominated for Silver Ribbon for best supporting actor.

== Plot ==
One of the survivors of the Porzûs massacre, Storno, travels to Slovenia to visit Geko, who did not see since the end of the war. The two recall all the dramatic events that have seen them protagonists between late 1944 and February 1945.

== Cast ==
- Lorenzo Crespi as Carlo Tofani "Geko" (young)
- Gastone Moschin as Carlo Tofani "Geko" (old)
- Lorenzo Flaherty as Umberto Pautassi "Storno" (young)
- Gabriele Ferzetti as Umberto Pautassi "Storno" (old)
- Giuseppe Cederna as "Nullo"
- Giulia Boschi as Ada Zambon
- Bruno Bilotta as "Dinamo"
- Massimo Bonetti as "Gobbo"
- Lino Capolicchio as "Galvano"
- Gianni Cavina as "Spaccaossi"
- Salvatore Calaciura as "Africa"
- Victor Cavallo as "Scabbia"
- Mariella Valentini as Albina
- Pietro Ghislandi as "Faccia-smorta"
