= Giuseppe M. Gaudino =

Italian film director

Giuseppe Mario Gaudino (born 16 May 1957) is an Italian director, screenwriter, documentarist and set designer. His cinema mainly focuses on social alienation and cultural displacement.

Born in Pozzuoli, Naples, Gaudino got a degree in set design at the Accademia di Belle Arti di Napoli and later enrolled at the Centro Sperimentale di Cinematografia in Rome, graduating in 1982. He debuted in 1984 with the silent short film Aldis, which was screened at the Venice Film Festival.

After directing several documentaries and being active as set designer in a number of films, Gaudino made his feature film debut in 1997 with the experimental drama Moonspins Between Land and Sea. The film was entered into the main competition at the 54th Venice International Film Festival, winning the Isvema Award and the Pasinetti Award for best film. The film also won the Tiger Award at the 1998 International Film Festival Rotterdam and the Grolla d'oro for best film.

His 2015 film Per amor vostro was screened in the main competition section of the 72nd Venice International Film Festival and for her performance in the film Valeria Golino won the Volpi Cup for Best Actress.
