= Giuseppe De Rosa =

Italian actor (born 1951)

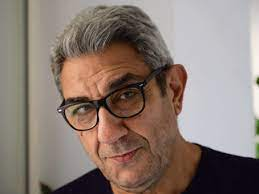
- Born: 7 November 1951 (age 74); Castellammare di Stabia, Italy
- Other names: Beppe De Rosa, Peppe De Rosa
- Height: 1.83 m (6 ft 0 in)

Giuseppe De Rosa (born 7 November 1951), also known as Beppe De Rosa or Peppe De Rosa, is an Italian film and television actor.

== Biography ==
Giuseppe De Rosa began his career in the theater around the second half 1970s often working on texts written by Eduardo De Filippo and Armando Pugliese.

Giuseppe De Rosa arrives at the cinema in the eighties in the roles of wealthy men; until the second half of the 1990s, the actor's notoriety remained linked mostly to the dialectal contexts in typical comedies, and even after making himself known to the cinema and television audience, the characters played by Giuseppe De Rosa would still recall this artistic cliché, for example in 1950s, where he plays the role of Don Raffaele, an arrogant property owner.

Since the nineties, Giuseppe De Rosa has acted on the small screen too, often working with the director Pier Francesco Pingitore who offered him roles such as that of Pope Alexander VI in the television film Imperia, the great courtesan.

Much appreciated by various directors, including Nanni Loy, Giuseppe De Rosa is co-protagonist together with Tommaso Bianco and Luigi Petrucci of the episode Package, double package and counter package which entitles the director's last film before his death.

== Selected filmography ==
- La gatta da pelare (1981)
- Where's Picone? (1983)
- What if Gargiulo Finds Out? (1988)
- Street Kids (1989)
- The Nymph (1996)
- Freewheeling (2000)
- South Kensington (2001)
- The Jokes (2004)
- Into Paradiso (2010)
- Welcome Mr. President (2013)
