= Anna Bonaiuto =

Italian actress (born 1950)

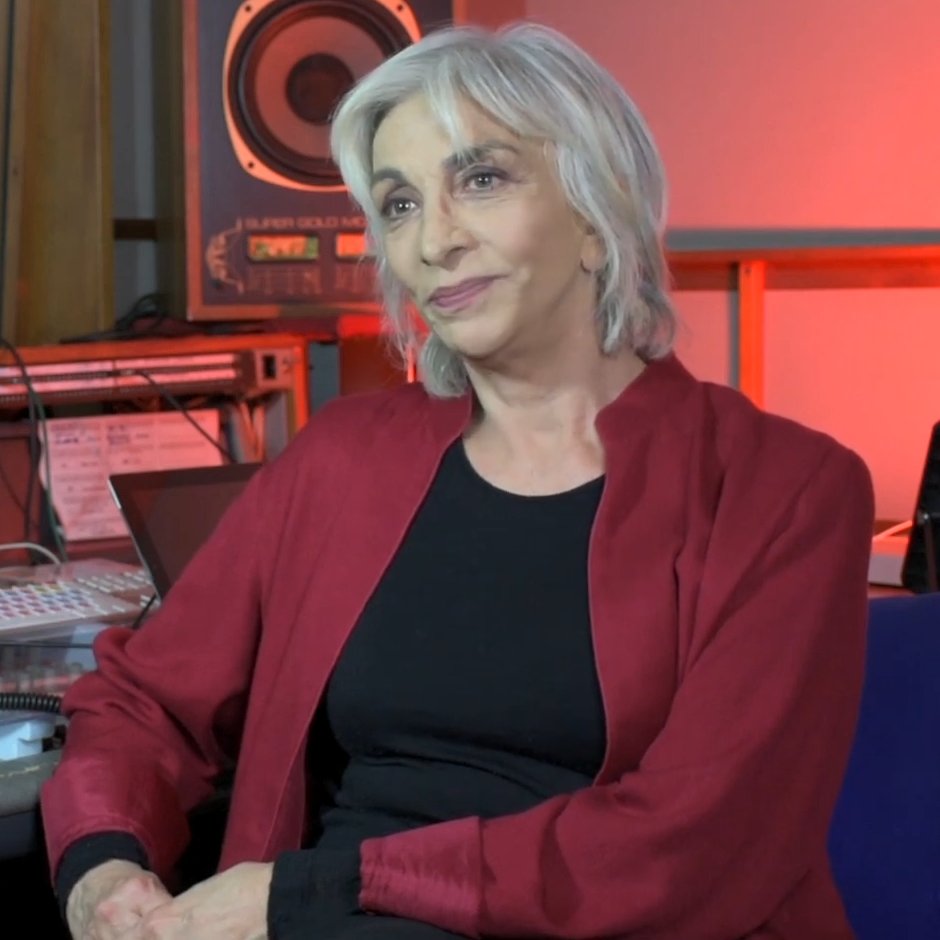
- Born: 28 January 1950 (age 76); Latisana, Italy
- Occupation: Actress
- Years active: 1973–present

Anna Bonaiuto (born 28 January 1950) is an Italian actress. She has appeared in 48 films and television shows since 1973. She starred in L'amore molesto, which was entered into the 1995 Cannes Film Festival.

== Selected filmography ==
Year	Film	Role	Notes
1973	Love and Anarchy	Prostitute	
1977	A Spiral of Mist	Armida	
1977	Ladies' Doctor	Rosalia Saggarrò	
1989	Donna d'ombra	Carla	Nominated—David di Donatello for Best Actress; Nominated—Italian Golden Globe Award for Best Actress
1990	The King's Whore	Countess Longhi	
1992	Brothers and Sisters	Gloria	Grolla d'oro for Best Actress; Nominated—Nastro d'Argento for Best Actress
1992	Death of a Neapolitan Mathematician	Anna	
1993	Where Are You? I'm Here	Mother	Volpi Cup for best supporting actress
1993	Giovanni Falcone	Francesca Morvillo	
1994	Il Postino: The Postman	Matilde	
1995	Nasty Love	Delia	(The film is based on the novel Troubling Love by Elena Ferrante); David di Donatello for Best Actress; Nastro d'Argento for Best Actress; Italian Golden Globe Award for Best Actress; Grolla d'oro for Best Actress
1997	The Vesuvians		
1998	Rehearsals for War	Sara Cataldi	Nominated—David di Donatello for Best Actress
1998	First the Music, then the Words	Marina Moltedo	
1999	Appassionate	Maddalena	
2006	The Caiman	Pubblico Ministero	
2007	My Brother Is an Only Child	Bella Nastri	Nominated—Golden Ciak for Best Supporting Actress
2007	The Girl by the Lake	Mrs. Sanzio	Nominated—David di Donatello for Best Actress; Nominated—Nastro d'Argento for Best Supporting Actress (also for Black and White)
2008	Black and White	Adua	
2008	Il Divo	Livia Danese, Giulio Andreotti's wife	Nominated—Nastro d'Argento for Best Supporting Actress; Nominated—Golden Ciak for Best Supporting Actress
2010	Me, Them and Lara	Beatrice Mascolo	Nominated—Golden Ciak for Best Supporting Actress
2010	We Believed	Cristina Trivulzio Belgiojoso	
2012	The Worst Christmas of My Life	Clara	
2013	Long Live Freedom	Evelina Pileggi	Nominated—David di Donatello for Best Supporting Actress
2014	Good for Nothing	Boss	
2015	Banana	Professor Colonna	
