= To Die for Tano =

1997 Italian musical comedy film by Roberta Torre

- Directed by: Roberta Torre
- Cinematography: Daniele Ciprì
- Edited by: Giogiò Franchini
- Music by: Nino D'Angelo
- Release date: 1997
- Country: Italy
- Language: Italian

Tano da morire (internationally released as To Die for Tano) is a 1997 Italian musical comedy film written and directed by Roberta Torre. It is loosely inspired by actual life events of Tano Guarrasi, a butcher and a jealous brother of four sisters who was also a little mafia boss and who was killed in his shop in September 1990.

== Plot ==
Tano Guarrasi is a butcher in the Vucciria market in Palermo as a cover for the fact that he is also an important member of the mafia. At the beginning of the film we witness his murder, and then retrace the steps that led him to join the mafia, as well as exploring his relationships with his family. This is represented by flashbacks with comic musical numbers. Tano is welcomed into the family with a dance in the style of Saturday Night Fever, accompanied by the song "Simme a' mafia". Then, the family mourns his death in a rap style, with the song "'O rap 'e Tano". Some scenes are filmed on location in the Vucciria market, and in others the market is recreated in the studio by set designer Fabrizio Lupo, who in collaboration with director of photography Daniele Ciprì successfully recreates the atmosphere of a neighbourhood theatre.

== Awards ==
It entered the 54th Venice International Film Festival, in which it won the FEDIC Award, the Kodak Award and the Luigi De Laurentiis Award for best directorial debut film. The film also won two David di Donatello (for best score and best new director) and three Nastro d'Argento (best score, best new director and best supporting role, an award given to the entire female cast).

== Cast ==
- Ciccio Guarino: Tano Guarrasi
- Mimma de Rosalia: Franca Guarrasi, sister of Tano
- Adele Liotta: sister of Tano
- Mariella Aliotta: sister of Tano
- Annamaria Gonfalone: sister of Tano
- Francesca Di Cesare: Anna
- Antonina Uzzo: Concetta
