= Roberta Torre =

Italian film director

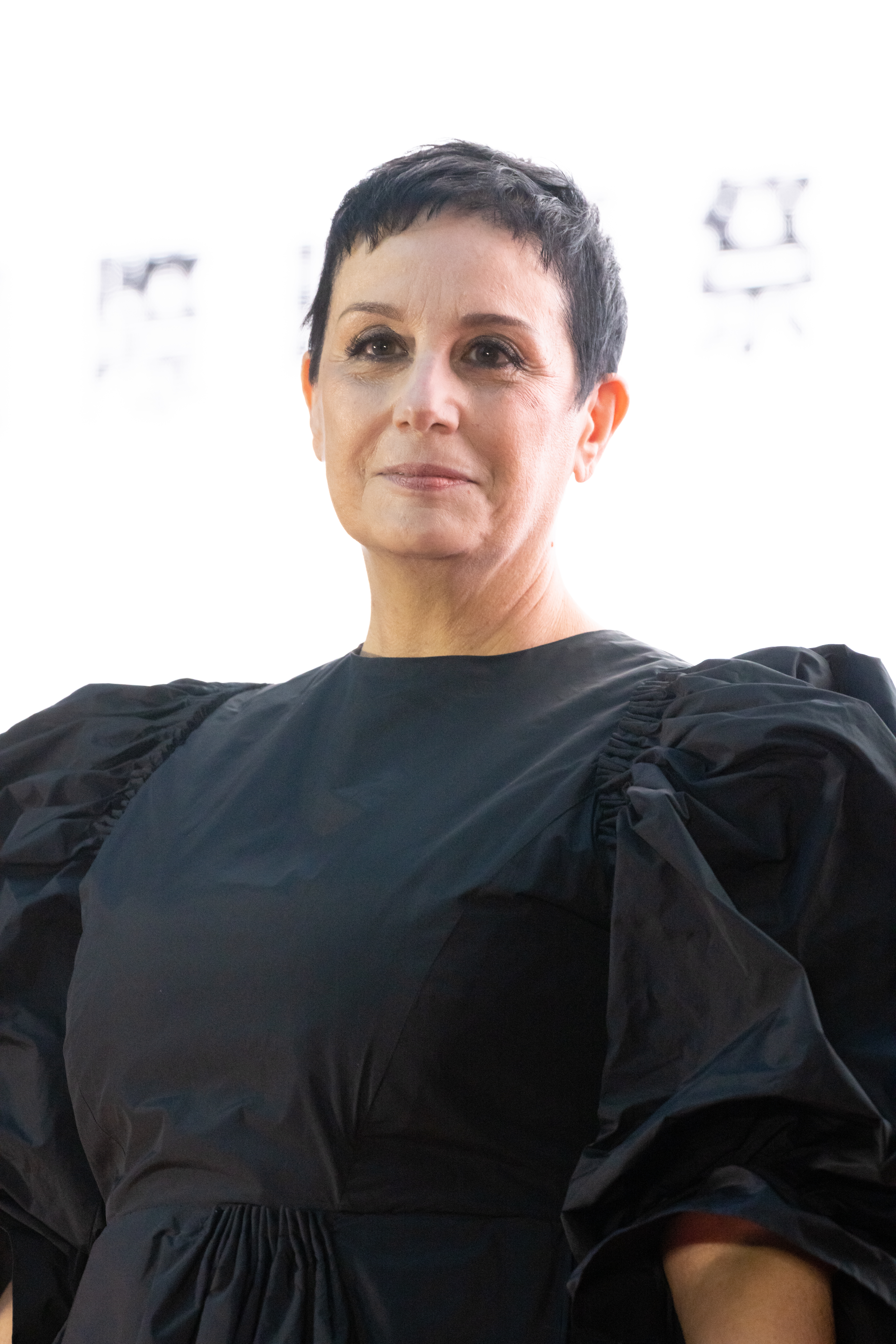
- Torre at the 2022 Tokyo International Film Festival
- Born: 21 September 1962 (age 63); Milan, Italy
- Occupations: Film director, screenwriter
- Years active: 1994-present

Roberta Torre (born 21 September 1962) is an Italian film director and screenwriter. In 1997 she won the Nastro d'argento for best new director with her first film, Tano da morire ("To Die for Tano"). The film entered the 54th Venice International Film Festival, winning the FEDIC Award, the Kodak Award and the Luigi De Laurentiis Award for best directorial debut film. The film also won two David di Donatello (for best score and best new director) and two other Nastro d'Argento for best score and best supporting role (an award given to the entire female cast).

== Biography ==
Roberta Torre was born in Milan. She studied Acting and Drama in Scuola d’Arte Drammatica Paolo Grassi, then Directing and Screenwriting in Casa del Teatro e del Cinema. There she met Ermanno Olmi, whom she refers to as the person who mostly shaped her artistic views and perception.

In 1990, Torre moved to Palermo, where she lived and worked for 10 years. In that period, she mostly focused on documentaries and short films. In 1990, she directed Tempo da buttare which won Aiace award at the 51st Venice International Film Festival. In 1994, she released Senti amor mio? and Le anime corte shorts. In 1996, she presented her documentary La vita a volo d’angelo at the Venice Film Festival. Her first feature film, To Die for Tano, was screened at the 54th Venice International Film Festival and brought her FEDIC Award, the Kodak Award and the Luigi De Laurentiis Award for best directorial debut film, as well as two David di Donatello (for best score and best new director) and three Nastro d'Argento (best score, best new director and best supporting role, an award given to the entire female cast).

In 2013, she was invited as an artist in residence to Indiana University Bloomington. In the following year, she led a postgraduate course on drama, art production and directing at Mills College at Northeastern University.

In 2022, her film Le favolose, premiered at the Giornate degli Autori in Venice. The film was well received by audience and critics, it was screened at numerous film festivals around the world and acclaimed at the Tokyo Film Festival and the London LGBTQIA+ Film Festival. Le favolose brought Torre Best Director Award in the Envision section at International Documentary Film Festival Amsterdam.

Torre received Celebration of Lives Award at 2023 Biografilm Festival in Bologna.

== Selected filmography ==
=== Documentaries and shorts ===
- La notte quando è morto Pasolini (2009)

=== Feature films ===
- To Die for Tano (1997)
- Sud Side Stori (2000)
- Il viaggio lungo di Arul, Rani e Vivetas (2002)
- Angela (2002)
- La malacanzone (2005)
- Mare nero (2006)
- Lost Kisses (2010)
- Bloody Richard (2017)
- Mi fanno male i capelli (2023)

=== TV series ===
- Extravergine (2019)

== Sources ==
- Enrico, Lancia (1998). I premi del cinema. Gremese Editore. ISBN 8877422211.
