= The Vesuvians =

- Directed by: Antonio Capuano, Pappi Corsicato, Antonietta De Lillo, Stefano Incerti and Mario Martone
- Starring: Toni Servillo
- Cinematography: Luca Bigazzi
- Release date: 1997
- Running time: 140 minutes
- Country: Italy
- Language: Italian

The Vesuvians (Italian: I vesuviani) is a 1997 Italian anthology film directed by Antonio Capuano, Pappi Corsicato, Antonietta De Lillo, Stefano Incerti and Mario Martone. It consists of five segments, all set in Naples. It was entered into the main competition at the 54th Venice International Film Festival.

== Cast ==
- Anna Bonaiuto
- Toni Servillo
- Iaia Forte
- Renato Carpentieri
- Teresa Saponangelo
- Clelia Rondinella
