= Carlo Cecchi =

Italian actor (1939–2026)

- Born: 25 January 1939
- Died: 23 January 2026 (aged 86)

Carlo Cecchi (25 January 1939 – 23 January 2026) was an Italian actor and theater director.

Born in Florence, Cecchi studied under the Living Theatre and with the Workshop of Eduardo De Filippo. He appeared in films such as La sua giornata di gloria (1969), Le Mans (1971) and Death of a Neapolitan Mathematician (1992). In 1971, he directed in Florence a theatre cooperative playing works by Shakespeare, Mayakovsky, Brecht, Chekhov, and Molière.

Cecchi died on 23 January 2026, at the age of 86.

== Selected filmography ==
- Le Mans (1971)
- The Escort (1993)
- The Horseman on the Roof (1995)
- Stealing Beauty (1996)
- The Mysterious Enchanter (1996)
- Hamam (1997)
- The Red Violin (1998)
- Milonga (1999)
- Appassionate (1999)
- Red Moon (2001)
- The Good Pope: Pope John XXIII (2003)
- The Goodbye Kiss (2006)
- Miele (2013)
- Martin Eden (2019)
- God Laughs (2026)
