= Antonietta De Lillo =

Italian film director (born 1960)

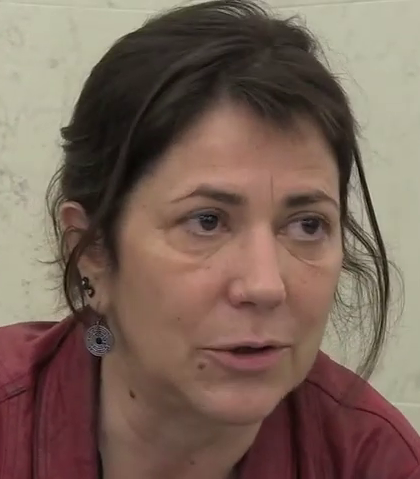
- De Lillo at the 2021 Bergamo Film Meeting
- Born: 6 March 1960 (age 65); Naples, Italy
- Occupation: Film director

Antonietta De Lillo (born 6 March 1960) is an Italian film director, screenwriter, producer and documentarist.

== Life and career ==
Born in Naples, De Lillo started her career collaborating with various publications as a photographer and later as a journalist. After studying at the DAMS department of the University of Bologna, she moved to Rome, where she entered the film industry as assistant operator.

De Lillo made her film debut co-directing with Giorgio Magliulo the 1986 comedy Una casa in bilico, which got the duo a nomination for David di Donatello for best new directors. After directing several documentaries and another film with Magliulo (Matilda, 1990), in 1995 she made her solo feature film debut with Vittoria's Tales.

Following a segment in the anthology film The Vesuvians, in 2001 De Lillo directed It's Not Right, which entered the main competition at the Locarno Film Festival and for which she was nominated for the Nastro d'Argento for best story. Her 2004 historical drama The Remains of Nothing premiered out of competition at the 61st Venice International Film Festival. For the film she received a nomination for Nastro d'Argento for best screenplay. In the following years, she directed several biographical documentaries, notably La pazza della porta accanto about poet Alda Merini and Fulci Talks about Lucio Fulci.

== Selected filmography ==
- Una casa in bilico (1986)
- Matilda (1990)
- Vittoria's Tales (1995)
- The Vesuvians (segment: Maruzzella, 1997)
- It's Not Right (2001)
- The Remains of Nothing (2004)
- All Human Rights for All (segment: Articolo 20, 2008)
- La pazza della porta accanto (documentary, 2013)
- Let's Go (documentary, 2014)
- Oggi insieme, domani anche (documentary, 2015)
- Il signor Rotpeter (2017)
- Fulci Talks (documentary, 2020)
- The Eye of the Hen (documentary, 2024)
