= Pappi Corsicato =

Italian film director

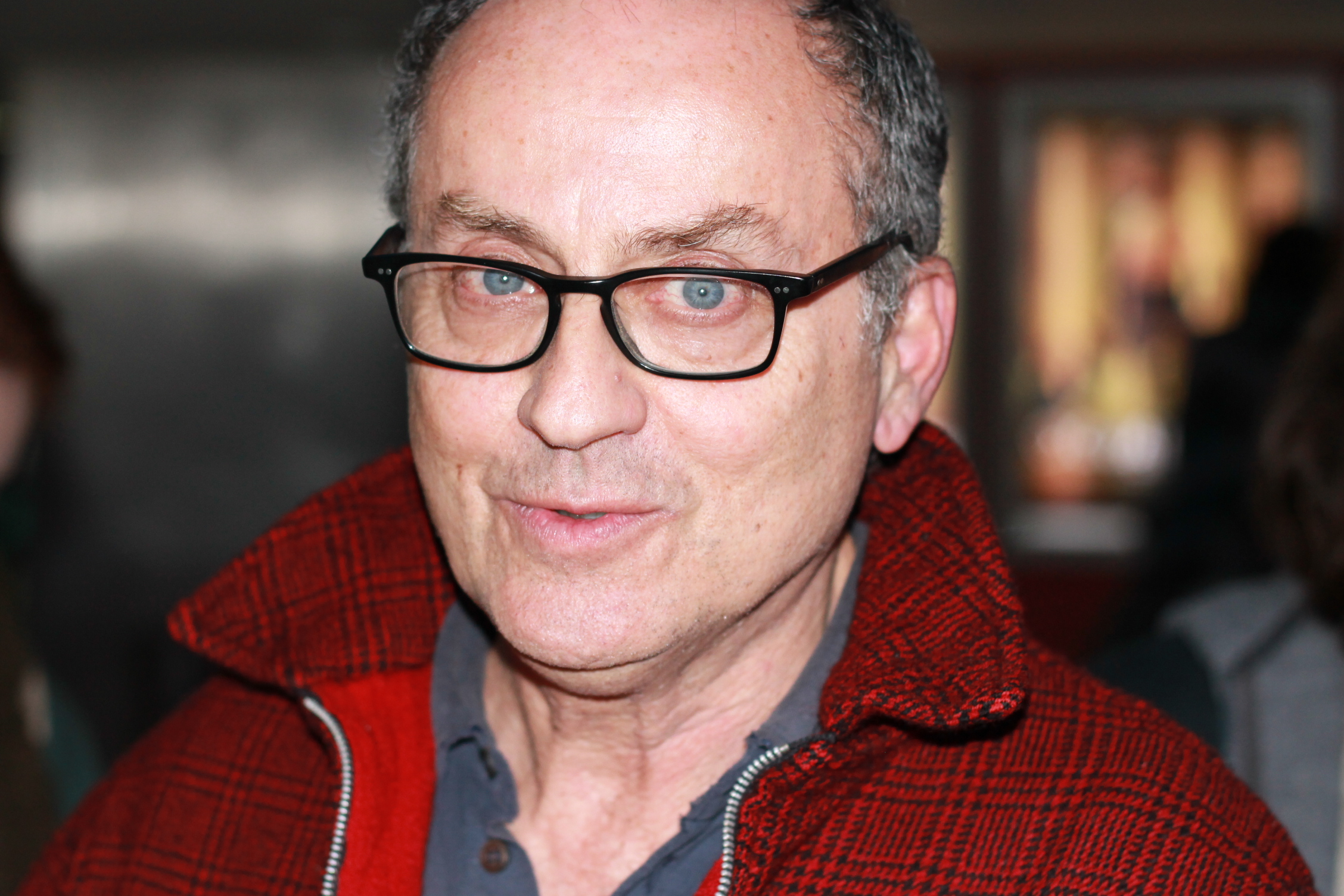
- Corsicato in 2017
- Born: Pasquale Corsicato; 12 June 1960 (age 65); Naples, Italy
- Occupations: Film director, screenwriter
- Years active: 1993–present

Pasquale "Pappi" Corsicato (born 12 June 1960) is an Italian film director and screenwriter.

== Selected filmography ==
- Libera (1993)
- Black Holes (1995)
- The Vesuvians (1997)
- Chimera (2001)
- The Seed of Discord (2008)
- Armando Testa - Povero ma moderno (2009)
- Another Woman's Face (2012)
- Julian Schnabel: A Private Portrait (2017)
- Pompeii: Sin City (2021)
- Deceitful Love (TV series, 2024)
