= Mario Martone =

Italian film director (born 1959)

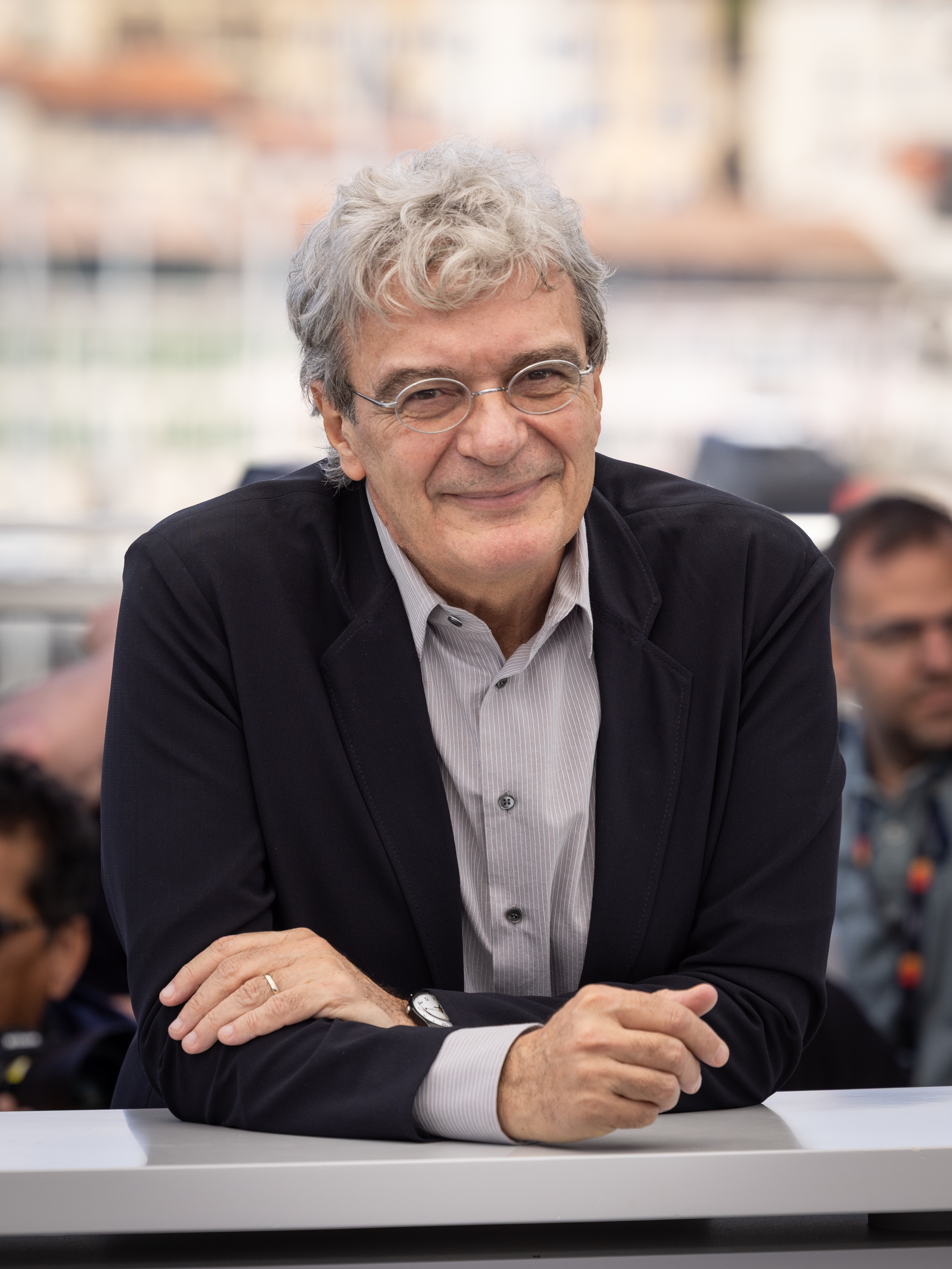
- Martone at the 2025 Cannes Film Festival
- Born: 20 November 1959 (age 66); Naples, Italy
- Occupations: Film director, screenwriter
- Years active: 1985–present

Mario Martone (born 20 November 1959) is an Italian filmmaker. He has directed more than 30 films since 1985. His films have been shown in prestigious international film festivals around the world.

His films Nasty Love (1995), Nostalgia (2022) and Fuori (2025) were selected competed for the Palme d'Or at the Cannes Film Festival. While Death of a Neapolitan Mathematician (1992), The Vesuvians (1997), We Believed (2010), Leopardi (2014), Capri-Revolution (2018), The Mayor of Rione Sanità (2019) and The King of Laughter (2021) were selected to compete for the Golden Lion at the Venice Film Festival.

== Career ==
=== Filmmaking ===
Martone's Death of a Neapolitan Mathematician (1992) was his feature film debut and had its world premiere at the 49th Venice International Film Festival, where it won the Grand Special Jury Prize (2nd place).

His thriller film Nasty Love (1995), based on Elena Ferrante's Troubling Love, had its world premiere at the main competition of the 1995 Cannes Film Festival, where it was nominated for the Palme d'Or. It received positive reviews from critics, while Martone won a David di Donatello for Best Director.

In 1997, he co-directed the anthology film The Vesuvians with Antonio Capuano, Pappi Corsicato, Antonietta De Lillo and Stefano Incerti. The film had its world premiere at the main competition at the 54th Venice International Film Festival, where it was nominated for the Golden Lion.

Martone's drama film Rehearsals for War (1998) had its world premiere at the Un Certain Regard section of the 1998 Cannes Film Festival. While his thriller film The Scent of Blood (2004) had its world premiere at the Directors' Fortnight section of the 2004 Cannes Film Festival.

After a six-year-long filmmaking hiatus, Martone returned with the drama film We Believed (2010). The film had its world premiere at the main competition at the 67th Venice International Film Festival, where it was nominated for the Golden Lion. It follows the 19th-century Young Italy political movement.

He followed with the drama film Leopardi (2014), which had its world premiere at the main competition at the 71st Venice International Film Festival, where it was nominated for the Golden Lion. Starring Elio Germano, it follows the short life of the Italian poet Giacomo Leopardi.

His period drama film Capri-Revolution (2018) also had its world premiere at the main competition at the 75th Venice International Film Festival, where it was nominated for the Golden Lion. It follows a commune of young artists from Northern Europe establishes itself on the rural island of Capri shortly before World War I.

Martone's crime drama film The Mayor of Rione Sanità (2019) had its world premiere at the main competition at the 76th Venice International Film Festival, where it was nominated for the Golden Lion. It follows the Camorra activities in the Rione Sanità neighborhood of Naples.

His biographical drama film The King of Laughter (2021) marked Martone's fifth feature film in a row to be nominated for the Golden Lion, at the 78th Venice International Film Festival. Starring Toni Servillo, it follows actor and playwright Eduardo Scarpetta's legal battle against Gabriele D'Annunzio over his parody of the latter's The Daughter of Iorio (1904).

His drama film Nostalgia (2022) had its world premiere at the main competition of the 2022 Cannes Film Festival, where it was nominated for the Palme d'Or, marking Martone's return to the festival main competition after nearly thirty years. Starring Pierfrancesco Favino, it received positive reviews from critics and Martone won his first Nastro d'Argento for Best Director, alongside wins for Best Actor (Favino), Best Screenplay and Best Supporting Actor (Francesco Di Leva and Tommaso Ragno).

In 2023, Martone directed Massimo Troisi: Somebody Down There Likes Me, it had its world premiere at the Berlinale Special section of the 73rd Berlin International Film Festival. It is a personal journey in Massimo Troisi's cinema.

Martone's biographical drama film Fuori (2025) had its world premiere at the main competition of the 2025 Cannes Film Festival, where it was nominated for the Palme d'Or. It follows the Italian writer Goliarda Sapienza, arrested for theft. It received mix reviews, but also received 10 nominations at the 2025 Nastro d'Argento, where it won Best Actress (Valeria Golino) and Best Supporting Actress (Matilda De Angelis and Elodie).

==== Upcoming films ====
In 2026, Martone started filming his next feature film starring Toni Servillo, Scherzetto.

=== Operas ===
He is also a noted stage director for operas. He staged the premiere performance of Lorenzo Ferrero's opera Charlotte Corday, which opened at Teatro dell'Opera di Roma on 21 February 1989.

Martone has since also staged three new productions of Gioachino Rossini's operas in the Rossini Opera Festival: Matilde di Shabran (2004, 2012), Torvaldo e Dorliska (2006, 2017), Aureliano in Palmira (2014, 2023).

== Filmography ==
=== Feature films ===
Year	English title	Original title	Notes
1992	Death of a Neapolitan Mathematician	Morte di un matematico napoletano	Grand Special Jury Prize at the 49th Venice International Film Festival
1993	Rasoi		
1995	Nasty Love	L'amore molesto	
1997	The Vesuvians	I vesuviani	Co-directed with Antonio Capuano, Pappi Corsicato, Antonietta De Lillo and Stefano Incerti
1998	Rehearsals for War	Teatro di guerra	
2001	Lulu		
2004	The Scent of Blood	L'odore del sangue	
2010	We Believed	Noi credevamo	
2014	Leopardi		
2018	Capri-Revolution		
2019	The Mayor of Rione Sanità	Il sindaco del Rione Sanità	
2021	The King of Laughter	Qui rido io	
2022	Nostalgia		Nastro d'Argento for Best Director
2025	Fuori		
2026	Trick	Scherzetto	

=== Documentaries ===
Year	English title	Original title
2005	Caravaggio, the Last Act	Caravaggio, l'ultimo tempo
2023	Massimo Troisi: Somebody Down There Likes Me	Laggiù qualcuno mi ama

=== Short films ===
Year	English title	Original title
1985	Nella città barocca	
1994	Miracoli, storie per corti	
1994	L'unico paese al mondo	
1996	Una Storia Saharawi	

=== Television ===
Year	English title	Original title	Notes
1985	Perfidi incanti		TV movie
1998	La terra trema		
