= Antonio Capuano (director) =

Italian film director

- Born: 9 April 1940 (age 86); Naples, Italy
- Occupations: Film director, screenwriter
- Years active: 1991–present

Antonio Capuano (born 9 April 1940) is an Italian film director and screenwriter.

After a long apprenticeship in television as a set designer (working on, amongst other things, the television series Sheridan, squadra omicidi), Capuano debuted in the world of cinema. In 1991, he started with the feature film Vito and the Others, a film about the difficult life of street children in Naples, winner of the eighth Settimana Internazionale della Critica at the Venice Film Festival. Success came in 1996 with the film Sacred Silence, which tells the story of a young altar boy abused by his parish priest.

Thereafter, he directed other films such as The Dust of Naples (1998) and Luna Rossa (2001), which won a Golden Lion nomination at the 58th Venice Film Festival. Another success was Mario's War (2005), for which Capuano won the critics' prize at the David di Donatello in 2006. He also directed segments in the collective films L'unico paese al mondo (1994) and I vesuviani (1997), and then Giallo? and L'amore buio.

Ciro Capano portrays a semi-fictionalized version of Capuano in Paolo Sorrentino's 2021 film The Hand of God.

== Selected filmography ==
- Vito and the Others (1991)
- Sacred Silence (1996)
- The Dust of Naples (1998)
- Red Moon (2001)
- Mario's War (2005)
- Dark Love (2010)
- Hungry Bird (2025)
