= The Sea Beyond (TV series) =

- Italian: Mare fuori
- Genre: Drama; Romance; Thriller; Teen drama; Erotic; Tragedy; Coming-of-age
- Created by: Cristiana Farina
- Starring: Carolina Crescentini; Carmine Recano; Valentina Romani; Nicolas Maupas; Massimiliano Caiazzo; Giacomo Giorgio; Artem Tkachuk; Domenico Cuomo; Serena De Ferrari; Matteo Paolillo; Antonio Orefice; Nicolò Galasso; Serena Codato; India Santella; Clotilde Esposito; Ludovica Coscione; Claudia Primavesi; Agostino Chiummariello; Carmen Pommella; Paola Benocci; Anna Ammirati; Vincenzo Ferrera; Antonio De Matteo; Kyshan Wilson; Filippo Soave; Maria Esposito; Alessandro Orrei; Lucredia Guidone; Maddalena Starnaiuolo; Francesco Panarella; Giuseppe Pirozzi; Salahudin Tijani; Clara; Yeva Sai; Luca Garone
- Music by: Stefano Lentini
- Opening theme: "'O mar for" composed and produced by Stefano Lentini, Lorenzo Gennaro, Matteo Paolillo, featuring Raiz
- Country of origin: Italy
- Original languages: Italian; Neapolitan
- No. of seasons: 5
- No. of episodes: 62

Production
- Producer: Roberto Sessa
- Camera setup: Videotape; Single-camera
- Running time: 60 minutes
- Production companies: Rai Fiction; Picomedia

Original release
- Network: Rai 2; Netflix
- Release: September 23, 2020 – present

The Sea Beyond (Italian: Mare fuori [ˈmaːre ˈfwɔːri], lit. '[The] Sea Outside') is an Italian drama television series that first aired on Rai 2 on 23 September 2020. It was created by Cristina Farina.

The first season premiered in Italy on 23 September 2020 and ended on 28 October 2020. The second debuted on 17 November 2021, ending on 22 December. The third series aired in the first half of February 2023 on the Rai owned streaming platform RaiPlay, and was later broadcast on television beginning from 15 February 2023, ending on 22 March.

== Plot ==
Carmine Di Salvo and Filippo Ferrari are arrested on the same day in Naples, but they seem to have nothing in common: Carmine dreams of becoming a professional hairdresser, despite being born into a Camorra family from which he would only like to escape so he can build an honest future; Filippo, on the other hand, is a promising pianist born into a very wealthy family in Milan who is on vacation in Naples. The two teenagers are locked up on the same night and sent to the same youth detention centre. Carmine was born into the world of crime and knows its rules perfectly, but for Filippo, it's like having landed on another planet where even the language (Neapolitan) is something he struggles to understand.

Both are immediately noticed by the inmate Ciro Ricci, son of a Camorra boss who has established himself as a sort of boss within the walls of the penitentiary. With the help of the loyal soldiers in his gang, Ciro begins to torment the two new arrivals. In the women's section comes Naditza, a Romani teenager who got herself arrested on purpose, not for the first time. She has been trying to escape her parents, who have arranged a marriage for her in the tradition of the Roma people.

Inmates have particularly difficult histories: some come from criminal families and have no intention of changing their lives; others have made mistakes because they were exasperated by abuse and mistreatment; still others, born into honest families, have been fascinated by the so-called "system" and the illusion of the comfort it would guarantee.

To try to make the inmates understand that it is possible to radically change direction and live honestly are the director Paola Vinci, the commander of the penitentiary police Massimo Esposito, the educator Beppe Romano and the various guards. Each of them, in their own way and with different methods, tries to demonstrate to the young prisoners that a different way is always possible.

== Cast and characters ==
=== Main ===
==== Introduced in season one ====
- Carolina Crescentini as Paola Vinci (season 1-3)
- Carmine Recano as Massimo Esposito
- Valentina Romani as Naditza Prigoanã (season 1-3)
- Nicolas Maupas as Filippo Ferrari (season 1-3)
- Massimiliano Caiazzo as Carmine Di Salvo (season 1-4)
- Giacomo Giorgio as Ciro Ricci (season 1; guest season 2-5)
- Artem Tkachuk as Giuseppe Pagano
- Domenico Cuomo as Gianni Russo (season 1-5)
- Serena De Ferrari as Viola Torri (season 1-3)
- Matteo Paolillo as Edoardo Conte (season 1-4)
- Antonio Orefice as Antonio Ascione (season 1-2; guest season 3-4)
- Nicolò Galasso as Gaetano Sannino (season 1-3; guest season 4)
- Serena Codato as Gemma Doria (season 1-3)
- India Santella as Serena Rizzo (season 1)
- Clotilde Esposito as Silvia Scacco (season 1-5)
- Ludovica Coscione as Teresa Polidori (season 1-5)
- Chiara Primavesi as Anita Ferrari (season 1-2)
- Agostino Chiummariello as Gennaro Fusco
- Carmen Pommella as Nunzia
- Paola Benocci as Amelia (season 1)
- Anna Ammirati as Elisabetta Centola (season 1-3)
- Vincenzo Ferrera as Giuseppe Romano
- Antonio De Matteo as Lino
- Raiz as Salvatore Ricci (season 1-4; guest season 5-6)

==== Introduced in season two ====
- Kyshan Wilson as Kubra Hailo (season 2-4)
- Maria Esposito as Rosa Ricci (season 3-6; guest season 2)
- Alessandro Orrei as Domenico Varriale (season 3-5; guest season 2)
- Filippo Soave as Salvatore Baldi (season 2)

==== Introduced in season three ====
- Lucrezia Guidone as Sofia Durante (season 3-6)
- Maddalena Stornaiuolo as Maddalena
- Francesco Panarella as Luigi Di Meo (season 3-6)
- Giuseppe Pirozzi as Raffaele Di Meo (season 3-6)
- Salahudin Tijani Imrana as Diego (season 3-6)
- Clara as Giulia Bertolacci (season 3-4)
- Yeva Sai as Alina Donetzka (season 4-6; guest season 3)

==== Introduced in season four ====
- Luca Varone as Angelo (season 5-6; guest season 4)

==== Introduced in season five ====
- Alfonso Capuozzo as Simone Caramitti
- Manuele Velo as Tommaso Aponte
- Francesco Luciani as Samuele Zego
- Francesco Di Tullio as Federico Notari
- Elisa Tonelli as Sonia (season 5-6)
- Rebecca Mogavero as Marta

==== Introduced in season six ====
- Romano Reggiani as Stefano Stazi
- Francesca Agostini as Claudia Conti
- Cartisia Somma as Sharon
- Carlotta Pinto as Marika
- Greta De Rosa as Annarella
- Virginia Bocelli as Stella Mazzanti
- Joyce Huang as Mei Ling

== Episodes ==
Series	Episodes	Originally released	
Series	Episodes	First released	Last released
1	12	23 September 2020	28 October 2020
2	12	17 November 2021	22 December 2021
3	12	1 February 2023	13 February 2023
4	14	14 February 2024	27 March 2024
5	12	26 March 2025	7 May 2025
6	12	4 March 2026	15 April 2026

=== Season 1 (2020) ===
No. overall	No. in season	Title	Directed by	Written by	Original release date
1	1	"Broken Lives" "Vite spezzate"	Carmine Elia	Maurizio Careddu; Cristiana Farina	23 September 2020
Paola Vinci becomes the director of a juvenile prison in Naples that seeks to reeducate and rehabilitate its young inmates. Carmine Di Salvo and Filippo Ferrari are two teenagers of the same age who come from different walks of life. Carmine Di Salvo was born to a Camorrista family in Naples, but is seen as weak by his family. After being fired from his job, Carmine visits the beach with his girlfriend Nina, but is attacked by Nazario Valletta, a member of a rival Camorra clan of his family. Though first paralysed by fear, Carmine stabs Nazario several times and is arrested. Filippo Ferrari is a wealthy young pianist from Milan who visits Naples on holiday. At the train station, he meets a Roma girl named Naditza, who steals his wallet and watch. That night, Filippo visits a nightclub with friends. Filippo accidentally causes his friend Greg's death and is arrested. Both teenagers, having been accused of murder, are taken to the juvenile prison. They are immediately targeted by Ciro Ricci, the most feared inmate in the prison.
2	2	"Crime Education" "Educazione criminale"	Carmine Elia	Maurizio Careddu; Cristiana Farina	23 September 2020
3	3	"Family Rules" "Ogni famiglia ha le sue regole"	Carmine Elia	Maurizio Careddu; Cristiana Farina; Peppe Fiore	30 September 2020
4	4	"Who Finds a Friend Finds a Treasure" "Chi trova un amico trova un tesoro"	Carmine Elia	Maurizio Careddu; Cristiana Farina; Peppe Fiore	30 September 2020
5	5	"The Cure of Revenge" "La vendetta per guarire"	Carmine Elia	Maurizio Careddu; Cristiana Farina; Luca Monesi	7 October 2020
6	6	"The Belonging" "L'appartenenza"	Carmine Elia	Maurizio Careddu; Cristiana Farina	7 October 2020
7	7	"Evil Love" "L'amore malvagio"	Carmine Elia	Maurizio Careddu; Cristiana Farina	14 October 2020
8	8	"Know Yourself" "Conosci te stesso"	Carmine Elia	Maurizio Careddu; Cristiana Farina; Luca Monesi	14 October 2020
9	9	"Broken Bonds" "Legami spezzati"	Carmine Elia	Maurizio Careddu; Cristiana Farina	21 October 2020
10	10	"The Shapes of Love" "Le forme dell'amore"	Carmine Elia	Maurizio Careddu; Cristiana Farina	21 October 2020
11	11	"The Right Thing" "Fai la cosa giusta"	Carmine Elia	Maurizio Careddu; Cristiana Farina	28 October 2020
12	12	"Die to Live" "Morire per vivere"	Carmine Elia	Maurizio Careddu; Cristiana Farina	28 October 2020

=== Season 2 (2021) ===
No. overall	No. in season	Title	Directed by	Written by	Original release date
13	1	"The Family That Will Be" "La famiglia che verrà"	Milena Cocozza	Maurizio Careddu; Cristiana Farina	17 November 2021
14	2	"Joy and Pain" "Nella gioia e nel dolore"	Milena Cocozza	Maurizio Careddu; Cristiana Farina	17 November 2021
15	3	"I’m Not Like You" "Io non sono come voi"	Milena Cocozza	Maurizio Careddu; Cristiana Farina	24 November 2021
16	4	"Love Who Hurts" "Amare chi fa male"	Milena Cocozza	Maurizio Careddu; Cristiana Farina	24 November 2021
17	5	"Water Above The Bridge" "Il passato che ritorna"	Milena Cocozza	Maurizio Careddu; Cristiana Farina; Luca Monesi	1 December 2021
18	6	"Mom is Mom" "La mamma è sempre la mamma"	Milena Cocozza	Maurizio Careddu; Cristiana Farina; Luca Monesi	1 December 2021
19	7	"Choiches Weigh" "Il peso delle scelte"	Ivan Silvestrini	Maurizio Careddu; Cristiana Farina; Luca Monesi	8 December 2021
20	8	"The Shapes of Love" "Le forme dell'amore"	Ivan Silvestrini	Maurizio Careddu; Cristiana Farina; Luca Monesi	8 December 2021
21	9	"Revelations" "Rivelazioni"	Ivan Silvestrini	Unknown	8 December 2021
22	10	"Nothing is at it Seems" "Niente è mai come sembra"	Ivan Silvestrini	Unknown	15 December 2021
23	11	"Guilty of Innocence" "Colpevole d'innocenza"	Ivan Silvestrini	Unknown	22 December 2021
24	12	"Breaking Point" "Il punto di rottura"	Ivan Silvestrini	Unknown	22 December 2021

=== Season 3 (2023) ===
No. overall	No. in season	Title	Directed by	Written by	Original release date
25	1	"Necessary Hate" "L'odio necessario"	Ivan Silvestrini	Maurizio Careddu; Cristiana Farina	1 February 2023
26	2	"Lure of Blood" "Il richiamo del sangue"	Ivan Silvestrini	Maurizio Careddu; Cristiana Farina	1 February 2023
27	3	"Double Revenge" "Doppia vendetta"	Ivan Silvestrini	Maurizio Careddu; Cristiana Farina	1 February 2023
28	4	"Love is Salvation" "L'amore che salva"	Ivan Silvestrini	Maurizio Careddu; Cristiana Farina	1 February 2023
29	5	"Love Isn't Real" "L'amore non esiste"	Ivan Silvestrini	Maurizio Careddu; Cristiana Farina; Angelo Petrella	1 February 2023
30	6	"The Age of Innocence" "L'età dell'innocenza"	Ivan Silvestrini	Maurizio Careddu; Cristiana Farina; Luca Monesi	1 February 2023
31	7	"Die to Rise" "Per nascere bisogna morire"	Ivan Silvestrini	Maurizio Careddu; Cristiana Farina	13 February 2023
32	8	"The Day of the End" "Un giorno tutto finisce"	Ivan Silvestrini	Maurizio Careddu; Cristiana Farina; Angelo Petrella	13 February 2023
33	9	"The Stages of Love" "Le fasi dell'amore"	Ivan Silvestrini	Maurizio Careddu; Cristiana Farina; Angelo Petrella	13 February 2023
34	10	"Rules of Friendship" "Le regole dell'amicizia"	Ivan Silvestrini	Maurizio Careddu; Cristiana Farina; Angelo Petrella	13 February 2023
35	11	"Friendship Is Forever" "Un'amicizia è per sempre"	Ivan Silvestrini	Maurizio Careddu; Cristiana Farina	13 February 2023
36	12	"The Choice" "La scelta"	Ivan Silvestrini	Maurizio Careddu; Cristiana Farina	13 February 2023

== Production ==
The series was created by Cristiana Farina, who co-wrote the script with Maurizio Careddu. Produced by Rai Fiction and Picomedia, the series is filmed in the naval base on Via Acton in Naples. Other filming locations in Naples include Maschio Angioino, the Caracciolo seafront, Galleria Umberto I, the Rione Sanità and Montesanto districts, Toledo underground station, the Centro direzionale, and Posillipo.

While airing the first season, producer Roberto Sessa confirmed that the second season was in production. Filming of the second season began on 19 April 2021 and lasted 19 weeks.

At the end of the last episode of the second season, the third season was announced, then officially confirmed in January 2022, the shooting of which began in the spring of the same year.

In March 2022, while the third season was still in the works, the decision to renew the series for the fourth season was confirmed.

In January 2023, when the third season was about to be released, the series had another renewal for the fifth and sixth seasons as well.

== Release ==
The first and second seasons were first broadcast by Rai 2 in 2020 and in 2021, and the episodes were added to the catalog of the RaiPlay platform a few hours after broadcasting on live TV. The only exceptions were episodes 1 and 2 of the second season, which were instead distributed by RaiPlay two days before the broadcast on Rai 2.

In May 2022, however, Rai lost the rights to distribute the series, which was consequently removed entirely from its video-on-demand platform. On 10 June 2022, the first two seasons of the series were added to the Netflix catalog, and only at this point did the series become a cult phenomenon, gaining great attention from audiences and critics.

For the third season of the series, however, the rights for broadcasting via streaming return to RaiPlay, which on 1 February 2023, publishes the first six episodes thus anticipating the first viewing on live TV. RaiPlay, on the same date, also republished the first two seasons that had been removed a year earlier.

On 13 February 2023, RaiPlay released the remaining six unedited episodes. On the platform it ranks at the top of the ranking of the most viewed on-demand serial programmes in a single day with almost 2.7 million views in 24 hours and from September 2020 up to that moment the fiction has had 80 million views overall.

During the same period, the first two seasons of the series continue to be popular on Netflix. The broadcast on live television of the third season (for the first time already fully distributed in streaming) began on 15 February 2023.

Thanks to the production and distribution company Beta Film, the series was distributed in France, Germany, Scandinavia and Spain, and is also viewable in Latin America, Israel, and the Nordic countries.

== Music ==
The soundtrack, composed and produced by Stefano Lentini, was released in five albums, each corresponding to one of the show's five seasons. It achieved remarkable success in Europe, with over 70 million streams on both Spotify and YouTube. Stefano Lentini was awarded double platinum and two gold records, marking a unique achievement in the viral success of a film score for a series entirely produced in Italy. The music combines classical compositions with prominent electronic elements, featuring a significant focus on original piano pieces and original songs. Almost all the songs in the series are sung by *Raiz, interpreter of Don Salvatore in the series and leader of the musical group "Almamegretta". Part of the music was performed by the RAI National Symphony Orchestra and the "I Piccoli Cantori" choir from Barcellona Pozzo di Gotto, and mixed by Grammy Award-winning sound engineer Geoff Foster. Stefano Lentini stated that the great success of the soundtrack is mainly due to the wide artistic freedom he was able to apply during the writing process, working with a team that gave him complete freedom in the compositional and arranging choices.

== Awards and nominations ==
Year	Award	Category	Nominee	Result	Ref.
2021	Cilento Fest	Best Actor	Raiz	Won	
2021	Cilento Fest	Best Soundtrack	Stefano Lentini	Won	
2022	Premio Berenice	Best Composer	Stefano Lentini	Nominated	
2023	Ciak d'Oro Serie TV	Best Audience Series Under 30	The Sea Beyond	Won	
2023	Nastri d'Argento Grandi Serie	Series of the Year	The Sea Beyond	Won	
2024	SIAE Music Awards	Best Soundtrack (Tv Series)	Stefano Lentini	Won	
2025	SIAE Music Awards	Best Soundtrack (Streaming)	Stefano Lentini	Won	
