= I Piccoli Cantori =

The Associazione Corale I Piccoli Cantori (in English: Little Singers Choral Association), simply known as I Piccoli Cantori or I Piccoli Cantori di Barcellona Pozzo di Gotto, is a famous Italian choir from the city of Barcellona Pozzo di Gotto, in Sicily.

The choir has won awards in contests such as the International Polyphonic Competition - Guido of Arezzo in Arezzo, Italy (1st prize in children's choir category, 2018), the Vittorio Veneto National Competition (two 1st prizes and the Grand Prize "Efrem Casagrande" in 2022), the International Choral Competition - professor Georgi D. Dimitrov in Varna, Bulgaria (1st prize in children's and youth choirs category, 2023), and the European Music Festival for Young People in Neerpelt, Belgium (three 1st prizes "cum laude" and one 1st prize "summa cum laude" in 2024).

I Piccoli Cantori choir also recorded the soundtrack of the Italian TV series The Sea Beyond ("Mare Fuori") and Belcanto, both composed by Stefano Lentini.

== History ==
The Associazione Corale I Piccoli Cantori was founded in 1999 by its current conductor Salvina Miano, with the goal of promoting choral and musical education in the area. After initially performing in festivals throughout Italy, the choir won many awards in multiple competitions:

- 2012 - Vittorio Veneto City Trophies National Choral Competition - 3rd place (children's voices)
- 2013 - "B. Albanese" Competition of Caccamo - 1st place
- 2013 - "Il Garda in coro" National Competition of Malcesine - 3rd place (sacred polyphony) - 3rd place (secular polyphony) - special prize for best sacred repertoire
- 2015 - "InCanto Mediterraneo" International Choral Festival of Milazzo - silver medal
- 2015 - Guido of Arezzo National Competition - 2nd place (children's voices) - Feniarco special prize for communicative quality in musical expression
- 2015 - A.M.A. Calabria National Competition of Lamezia Terme - 1st place
- 2017 - "Il Garda in coro" National Competition of Malcesine - 1st place (junior) - 1st place (children's voices) - Winner of the "Il Garda in coro" Grand Prix
- 2018 - Guido of Arezzo International Polyphonic Competition - 1st place (children's voices) - 3rd place (sacred polyphony)
- 2022 - Vittorio Veneto City Trophies National Choral Competition - 1st place (children's voices) - 1st place (sacred polyphony) - special prize for the best project-programme - Winner of the Efrem Casagrande Grand Prix
- 2023 - "Professor G. Dimitrov" International Choral Competition of Varna - 1st place (children's and youth voices) - special prize for the best performance of a Bulgarian piece by a foreign choir - special prize for best conducting
- 2024 - European Music Festival for Young People of Neerpelt - 1st prize cum laude (children's voices) - 1st prize Summa cum laude (mixed youth) - 1st prize cum laude (children's voices Pennant Series) - 1st prize cum laude (equal voices youth Pennant Series)
- 2025 - "Il Cantagiovani" International Competition and Festival - 1st place (sacred and secular polyphony) - "Dante Cianciaruso" special prize for the highest score in the performance of an early music piece

== Members ==
The conductor of the I Piccoli Cantori choir is Salvina Miano (its founder), while the president is Salvatore Perdichizzi. There are around fifty members among the three main groups (children's choir, equal voices youth choir, mixed youth choir). The accompanists are pianists Dario T. Pino (children and equal voices) and Anita Munafò (children and mixed choir).
