= Georgi Dimitrov (disambiguation) =

Georgi Dimitrov (1882–1949) was a Bulgarian communist and prime minister of the country from 1946 to 1949.

Georgi Dimitrov may also refer to:

- G. M. Dimitrov (1903–1972), Bulgarian politician
- Georgi Dimitrov Dimitrov (born 1958), Bulgarian sociologist
- Georgi Dimitrov (alpine skier) (1930–2024), Bulgarian Olympic skier
- Georgi Dimitrov (footballer, born 1931) (1931–1978), Bulgarian football player
- Georgi Dimitrov (footballer, born 1959) (1959–2021), Bulgarian football player
- Georgi Dimitrov (composer) (1904–1979), Bulgarian composer
- Georgi Dimitrov (conductor), Bulgarian conductor with the Rousse Philharmonic Orchestra
- Georgi Dimitrov (gymnast) (born 1911), Bulgarian Olympic gymnast
