= Ammirati =

Ammirati is a surname of Italian origin, derived from the medieval given name Ammiratus, which means "commander". Notable people with the surname include:

- Anna Ammirati (born 1979), Italian actress
- Anthony Ammirati (born 2003), French pole vaulter
