= Vincenzo Ferrera =

Italian actor (born 1973)

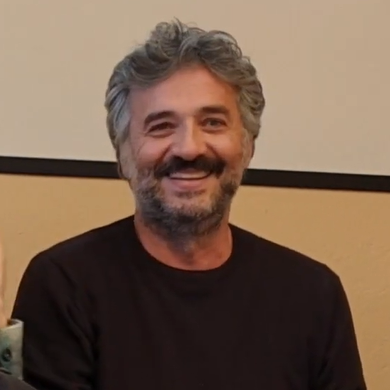
- Vincenzo Ferrera in 2023
- Born: 21 April 1973 (age 53); Palermo, Italy
- Occupation: Actor
- Years active: 2004–present

Vincenzo Ferrera (born 21 April 1973) is an Italian actor.

== Biography ==
Vincenzo Ferrera was born in Palermo. He has shown an interest in acting since he was a teenager. Ferrera started taking part in theater organizations immediately after high school. He entered the world of entertainment with the Teatro Biondo school and with the Gruppo della Rocca. In 2008, he participated in the Rai 3 soap opera Agrodolce, in the role of Stefano Martorana.

Ferrera also appeared in the film Borsellino's angels in 2003, directed by Rocco Casareo, in the role of Vincenzo Li Muli, the miniseries An almost perfect dad, directed by Maurizio Dell'Orso, broadcast by Rai 1, in which he was co-protagonist with Michele Placido, Il capo dei capi, in the role of Commissioner Beppe Montana, broadcast in 2007 on Canale 5, The thirteenth apostle, The young Montalbano, Un posto al sole, in the role of Eduardo Nappi and Utopia in the role of Mino Pecorelli. In Mare fuori is the educator Beppe Romano while in Survivors he is Gaetano Russo.

== Filmography ==
=== Cinema ===
- Monella, directed by Tinto Brass (1998)
- Rose e pistole, directed by Carla Apuzzo (1998)
- I fetentoni, directed by Alessandro Di Robilant (1999)
- Quartetto, directed by Salvatore Piscicelli (2001)
- La rivincita, directed by Armenia Balducci (2002)
- La repubblica di San Gennaro, directed by Massimo Costa (2003)
- Alla fine della notte, directed by Salvatore Piscicelli (2003)
- ...e dopo cadde la neve, directed by Donatella Baglivo (2005)
- Amore e libertà - Masaniello, directed by Angelo Antonucci (2006)
- L'amore buio, directed by Antonio Capuano (2010)
- Breve storia di lunghi tradimenti, directed by Davide Marengo (2012)
- Ma che bella sorpresa, directed by Alessandro Genovesi (2015)
- Adesso tocca a me, directed by Francesco Miccichè (2017)
- La mia banda suona il pop, directed by Fausto Brizzi (2020)
- La notte più lunga dell'anno, directed by Simone Aleandri (2022)

=== Television ===
- Positano, directed by Vittorio Sindoni - miniseries (1996)
- Non lasciamoci più, directed by Vittorio Sindoni - miniseries (2000)
- Inviati speciali, directed by Francesco Laudadio - TV film (2001)
- Sospetti 2, directed by Gianni Lepre - miniseries (2003)
- La squadra (2004)
- Joe Petrosino, directed by Alfredo Peyretti - TV film (2006)
- Donna detective, directed by Cinzia TH Torrini - miniseries (2007–2010)
- Il generale Dalla Chiesa, directed by Giorgio Capitani - TV film (2007)
- Scusate il disturbo, directed by Luca Manfredi - miniseries (2009)
- Io e mio figlio - Nuove storie per il commissario Vivaldi, directed by Luciano Odorisio - miniseries, 1 episode (2010)
- All Stars, directed by Massimo Martelli (2010)
- Tutti i padri di Maria, directed by Luca Manfredi - miniseries (2010)
- L'oro di Scampia, directed by Marco Pontecorvo - TV film (2014)
- Una pallottola nel cuore, directed by Luca Manfredi - episode 3 "Il passato che ritorna" (2014)
- Non uccidere, directed by Giuseppe Gagliardi - miniseries, 6º episodio (2015)
- L'allieva, episode 6 "Corno d'Africa" (2016)
- Paolo Borsellino - Adesso tocca a me, directed by Francesco Micciché - documentary (2017)
- Squadra mobile - Operazione Mafia Capitale, directed by Alexis Sweet, 14 episodes (2017)
- In punta di piedi, directed by Alessandro D'Alatri - TV film (2018)
- Mare fuori, directed by Carmine Elia, Milena Cocozza e Ivan Silvestrini (2020-in corso)
- Una sola debole voce (A single weak voice), directed by Alberto Sironi - TV miniseries (1999)
- Un medico in famiglia 2 (A doctor in the family 2), directed by Tiziana Aristarco and Riccardo Donna - TV series (2000)
- Via Zanardi, 33, directed by Antonello De Leo - sit-com (2001)
- Un papà quasi perfetto (An almost perfect dad), directed by Maurizio Dell'Orso - TV miniseries (2003)
- Come mosche (Like flies), directed by Eugenio Cappuccio - TV film (2003)
- Distretto di Polizia 6 (Police District 6), directed by Antonello Grimaldi - TV series, episodes 6x17 and 6x19 (2006)
- Il capo dei capi (The Boss of Bosses), directed by Alexis Sweet and Enzo Monteleone - TV miniseries (2007)
- Agrodolce (Bittersweet), various directors - soap opera (2008–2009)
- Il tredicesimo apostolo - Il prescelto (The Thirteenth Apostle - The Chosen One), directed by Alexis Sweet - TV series (2012)
- Un posto al sole (A Place in the Sun), various directors - soap opera (2013-ongoing)
- Utopia (2014), episode 2x01
- Un medico in famiglia 9 (A doctor in the family) - TV series, episodes 11, 23 (2014)
- Il giovane Montalbano (The Young Montalbano) - TV series (2012), directed by Gianluca Tavarelli - episode Back to the origins
- Un passo dal cielo 3 (One step from heaven 3) - TV series - episode Friends for the skin (2015)
- Squadra antimafia 7 (Anti-mafia squad 7) - TV series, episodes 7x04, 7x05, 7x06 (2015)
- Boris Giuliano - Un poliziotto a Palermo (Boris Giuliano - A Cop in Palermo), directed by Ricky Tognazzi - TV miniseries (2016)
- Don Matteo 10 - TV series (2016) episode: (Resurrezione) Resurrection
- La mossa del cavallo - C'era una volta Vigata (The Horse Moves - Once Upon a Time Vigata), directed by Gianluca Maria Tavarelli - TV film (2018)
- Il cacciatore (The Hunter) - TV series 7 episodes (2018)
- Duisburg - Bloodline, directed by Enzo Monteleone - TV film (2019)
- Mare fuori (Sea Outside), directed by Carmine Elia, Milena Cocozza and Ivan Silvestrini - TV series (2020-ongoing)
- Sopravvissuti (Survivors), directed by Carmine Elia - TV series (2022)
- Per Elisa - Il caso Claps (For Elisa - The Claps Case), directed by Marco Pontecorvo - TV miniseries (2023)
- Noi siamo leggenda (We are legend), directed by Carmine Elia - TV series (2023)
