= Carmine Recano =

Italian actor (born 1980)

- Born: 28 November 1980 (age 45); Naples, Italy
- Occupation: Actor
- Years active: 1999–present
- Spouse: Donatella Tipaldi (m. 2024)
- Children: 2

Carmine Recano (Italian pronunciation: [ˈkarmine reˈkaːno]; born 28 November 1980) is an Italian actor. He is best known for playing Commander Massimo Esposito in the teen drama television series The Sea Beyond (2020–2023).

== Biography ==
Recano was born in Naples and raised in the district of Secondigliano. His father was a baker and his mother was a homemaker. He began acting by chance after accompanying a friend to an audition at the age of 17.

He married Donatella Tipaldi in 2024. They have two children.

== Filmography ==
=== Film ===
| Year | Title | Role | Ref. |
|---|---|---|---|
| 1999 | Un nuovo giorno | Roberto | |
| 2001 | The Ignorant Fairies | Israele | |
| 2001 | Terrarossa | Filippo | |
| 2002 | La vita degli altri | Salvatore | |
| 2002 | Pesi leggeri | Nino | |
| 2003 | Three-Step Dance | Luca | |
| 2003 | I cinghiali di Portici | Antimo | |
| 2004 | A Children's Story | Damiano | |
| 2008 | A Perfect Day | Poliziotto | |
| 2010 | Loose Cannons | Marco | |
| 2011 | Tatanka | Rosario | |
| 2012 | Faccia d'angelo | Ispettore Bruno Ricci | |
| 2014 | The Price of Crime | Gennaro Cavani | |
| 2014 | La strada dritta | Gaetano De Angelis | |
| 2017 | Naples in Veils | Domenico | |
| 2018 | Anche senza di te | Luca | |
| 2019 | The Goddess of Fortune | Doctor | |
| 2024 | Diamonds | Leonardo Cavani | |

=== Television ===
| Year | Title | Role | Notes | Ref. |
|---|---|---|---|---|
| 2001 | Don Matteo | Marco Baldini | 1 episode | |
| 2002 | Un posto al sole | Ciro Gambardella | 1 episode | |
| 2003–2005 | Sospetti | Ridge | 9 episodes | |
| 2006 | Orgoglio | | 1 episode | |
| 2006 | Crimini | | 1 episode | |
| 2006–2008 | Capri | Carmelo | 2 episodes | |
| 2007 | Gente di mare | | 1 episode | |
| 2008 | Carabinieri | | 1 episode | |
| 2008 | Provaci ancora prof! | Renato Aiello | 1 episode | |
| 2009–2011 | La nuova squadra | | | |
| 2013 | Il clan dei camorristi | Antonio Ruggero | 3 episodes | |
| 2014 | Gli anni spezzati | Luca Varesi | 1 episode | |
| 2017 | Amore pensaci tu | Jacopo La Neve | 20 episodes | |
| 2019–2023 | La porta rossa | Federico Testa | | |
| 2020–2023 | The Sea Beyond | Massimo Esposito | 8 episodes | |
| 2022 | Sopravvissuti | Ivan De Santis | 2 episodes | |
| 2025 | Belcanto | Domenico Bernasca | 8 episodes | |
| 2025 | Sara: Woman in the Shadows | Massimiliano Tamburi | 6 episodes | |
| 2025 | Noi del Rione sanità | Don Giuseppe Santoro | | |
