= La nuova squadra =

- Genre: Police procedural; Drama
- Starring: Rolando Ravello; Pietro Taricone; Lisa Galantini; Elaine Bonsangue; Federico Tocci; Tony Sperandeo; Ciro Esposito; Antonio Milo; Carmine Recano; Gennaro Silvestro; Marco Giallini; Irene Ferri; Gabriele Mainetti; Teresa Saponangelo; Luigi Petrucci; Antonio Pennarella; Duccio Giordano; Andrea Tidona; Antonio Gerardi; Marcella Granito; Vanni Corbellini; Flavio Montrucchio; Francesco Pannofino
- Country of origin: Italy
- Original language: Italian
- No. of seasons: 3
- No. of episodes: 84

Original release
- Network: Rai Uno
- Release: 12 March 2008 – 18 March 2011

La nuova squadra is an Italian television series.

== See also ==
- List of Italian television series
