= Eleonora Daniele =

Italian actress and television presenter

- Born: 20 August 1976 (age 49); Padua, Italy
- Occupations: TV host, former actress

Eleonora Daniele (born 20 August 1976) is an Italian television presenter and former actress. She currently hosts the early morning programme, Unomattina, on Rai Uno. She considers herself Roman Catholic.

== Biography ==
The last of four siblings, she spent her childhood in Saonara, where her parents ran a delicatessen.

After graduating from high school, she took up acting, participating in a few theater productions. In the spring of 2001 came her first television experience as an extra in the program La sai l'ultima?, broadcast on Canale 5. In the fall of that year, she became known among the general public by taking part as a contestant in the Grande Fratello season 2 of the Reality television Big Brother, where she was eliminated during the tenth episode with 44 percent of the vote. At the time of her participation in the program she was working at a bank.
