= Clotilde Esposito =

Italian actress

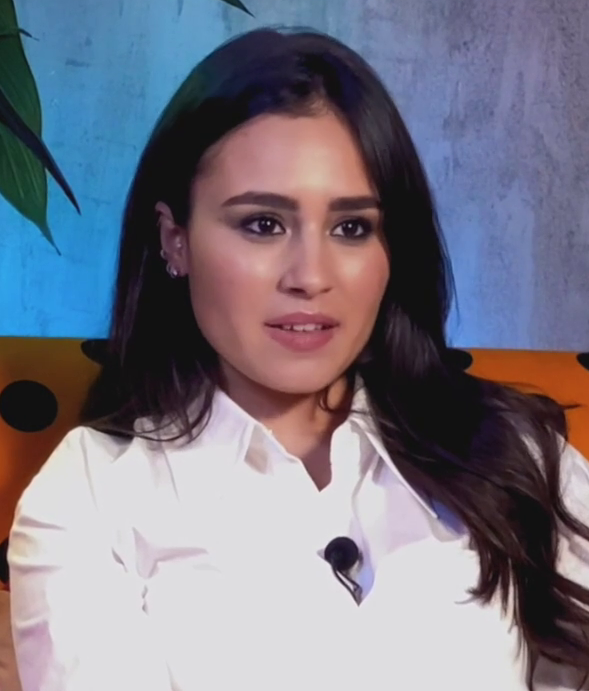
- Born: 20 April 1997 (age 28); Naples, Italy
- Occupation: Actress

Clotilde Esposito (born 20 April 1997) is an Italian theatre and film actress. She is best known for playing Silvia Scacco in the Italian drama television series The Sea Beyond (2020–present).

== Biography ==
Clotilde Esposito was born in Naples, she studied acting at the "La Ribalta" School of Cinema, Theater and Dance in Castellammare di Stabia from 2012 to 2017 and graduated in law. In 2012 she played the character of Greta Fournier as a teenager in the soap opera Un posto al sole. The following year she took part in the fiction Pupetta - Il coraggio e la passione and in 2014 she was in the cast of the film Milionari by Alessandro Piva. In 2015 she took part in a workshop at the La Ribalta acting school together with casting director Pino Pellegrino and the fiction Sotto copertura. Between 2014 and 2017 she took part in Furore while starting from 2020 she will become part of the permanent cast of The Sea Beyond. She's currently dating italian rapper Kid Yugi.

== Filmography ==
=== Cinema ===
- Milionari, directed by Alessandro Piva (2014)

=== Television ===
- Un posto al sole - TV series (2012)
- Pupetta - Il coraggio e la passione TV series (2013)
- Sotto copertura - serie TV (2015)
- Furore - TV series (2014–2017)
- The Sea Beyond (2020–present)
