= Grande Fratello season 1 =

Season of television series

Grande Fratello
- Season 1
- Presented by: Daria Bignardi
- No. of days: 99
- No. of housemates: 10
- Winner: Cristina Plevani
- Runner-up: Salvatore "Salvo" Veneziano

Release
- Original network: Canale 5
- Original release: 14 September – 21 December 2000

Season chronology
- Next → Season 2

Grande Fratello 1 is the first season of the Italian version of the reality show franchise Big Brother. It follows ten contestants, known as housemates, who are isolated from the outside world for an extended period of time in a custom-built house. Every two weeks, one housemate is evicted by a public vote. The last remaining housemate, Cristina Plevani, was declared the winner.

The first season debuted on 14 September 2000 and concluded on 21 December 2000.

== Format ==
Every two weeks, the housemates were called to the confessional to nominate someone, choosing two housemates whom they wished the public to vote on. The two or more housemates with the most nominations would face the public vote, and the least popular housemate was evicted from the house.

== Housemates ==
Housemates	Age	Birthplace	Occupation	Day entered	Day exited	Status
Cristina Plevani	28	Iseo	Lifeguard	1	99	Winner
Salvatore "Salvo" Veneziano	25	Syracuse	Pizzeria Chef	1	99	Runner-up
Pietro Taricone	25	Frosinone	Student	1	99	3rd Place
Rocco Casalino	28	Frankenthal, Germany	Engineer	1	92	7th Evicted
Maria Antonietta Tilloca	27	Alghero	Artist	1	85	6th Evicted
Marina La Rosa	23	Messina	Student	1	71	5th Evicted
Sergio Volpini	25	Ancona	Surfer	1	57	4th Evicted
Lorenzo Battistello	27	Vicenza	Chef	1	43	3rd Evicted
Roberta Beta	35	Milan	Employee	1	29	2nd Evicted
Francesca Piri	24	Galatina	Student	1	15	1st Evicted

== Nominations table ==
	Week 2	Week 4	Week 6	Week 8	Week 10	Week 12	Week 13	Week 14 Final		Nominations received
Cristina	Francesca, Roberta	Pietro, Roberta	Lorenzo, Marina	Marina, Rocco	Marina, Rocco	Rocco, Salvo	Pietro, Rocco	Winner (Day 99)		15
Salvo	Marina, Roberta	Maria, Roberta	Lorenzo, Sergio	Cristina, Sergio	Cristina, Marina	Cristina, Maria	Pietro, Rocco	Runner-Up (Day 99)		5
Pietro	Maria, Roberta	Marina, Roberta	Lorenzo, Maria	Cristina, Sergio	Maria, Marina	Cristina, Maria	Cristina, Salvo	Third Place (Day 99)		9
Rocco	Maria, Roberta	Pietro, Roberta	Cristina, Sergio	Cristina, Sergio	Cristina, Maria	Cristina, Maria	Cristina, Salvo	Evicted (Day 92)		9
Maria	Roberta, Sergio	Marina, Salvo	Lorenzo, Marina	Marina, Rocco	Marina, Rocco	Pietro, Rocco	Evicted (Day 85)			9
Marina	Roberta, Sergio	Pietro, Roberta	Cristina, Sergio	Cristina, Sergio	Cristina, Salvo	Evicted (Day 71)				15
Sergio	Francesca, Roberta	Pietro, Roberta	Lorenzo, Marina	Marina, Rocco	Evicted (Day 57)					11
Lorenzo	Francesca, Roberta	Pietro, Roberta	Cristina, Sergio	Evicted (Day 43)						6
Roberta	Marina, Pietro	Lorenzo, Marina	Evicted (Day 29)							16
Francesca	Roberta, Sergio	Evicted (Day 15)								3
Nominated	Francesca, Roberta, Sergio	Pietro, Roberta	Lorenzo, Sergio	Cristina, Sergio	Cristina, Marina	Cristina, Maria	Cristina, Pietro, Rocco, Salvo	Cristina, Pietro, Salvo		
Evicted	Francesca; 66.3% to evict	Roberta; 58% to evict	Lorenzo; 54% to evict	Sergio; 65% to evict	Marina; 83% to evict	Maria; 51.2% to evict	Rocco; 55% to evict	Pietro; 15% to win	Salvo; 25% to win	
Evicted	Francesca; 66.3% to evict	Roberta; 58% to evict	Lorenzo; 54% to evict	Sergio; 65% to evict	Marina; 83% to evict	Maria; 51.2% to evict	Rocco; 55% to evict	Cristina; 60% to win		

== Viewership ==
Grande Fratello started with five million viewers at the launch of the show. Viewing figures increased fast, with ten million viewers watching the eighth episode. It reached sixteen million viewers at the season finale.
