= Positano (miniseries) =

1996 Italian television miniseries

- Created by: Vittorio Sindoni
- Composer: Gianni Mazza
- Country of origin: Italy
- No. of seasons: 1
- No. of episodes: 4

Original release
- Network: Rai 1
- Release: 1996 – 1966

Positano is a 1996 Italian television comedy mini series written and directed by Vittorio Sindoni. It was broadcast on Rai 1.

== Cast ==
- Amanda Sandrelli as Daria
- Milly Carlucci as Luisa
- Duccio Giordano as Andrea
- Marta Armando as Lucilla
- Andrea Giordana
- Lorenzo Iavarone
- Angelo Infanti
- Ivo Garrani
- Anna Ammirati
- Franco Angrisano
- Carlotta Miti
- Gianfranco Barra
