= One Kiss (film) =

- Theatrical release poster
- Directed by: Ivan Cotroneo
- Written by: Ivan Cotroneo; Monica Rametta
- Produced by: Francesca Cima
- Starring: Rimau Grillo Ritzberger; Valentina Romani; Leonardo Pazzagli
- Cinematography: Luca Bigazzi
- Edited by: Ilaria Fraioli
- Production companies: Indigo Film; Titanus; Lucky Red; Rai Cinema; Friuli Venezia Giulia Film Commission
- Distributed by: Lucky Red
- Release date: 31 March 2016
- Running time: 101 min
- Country: Italy
- Language: Italian

One Kiss is a 2016 Italian film, directed by Ivan Cotroneo and based on the novel of the same name, written by him and published in 2010 by Bompiani. The film's main themes are homophobia and bullying in schools.

== Plot ==
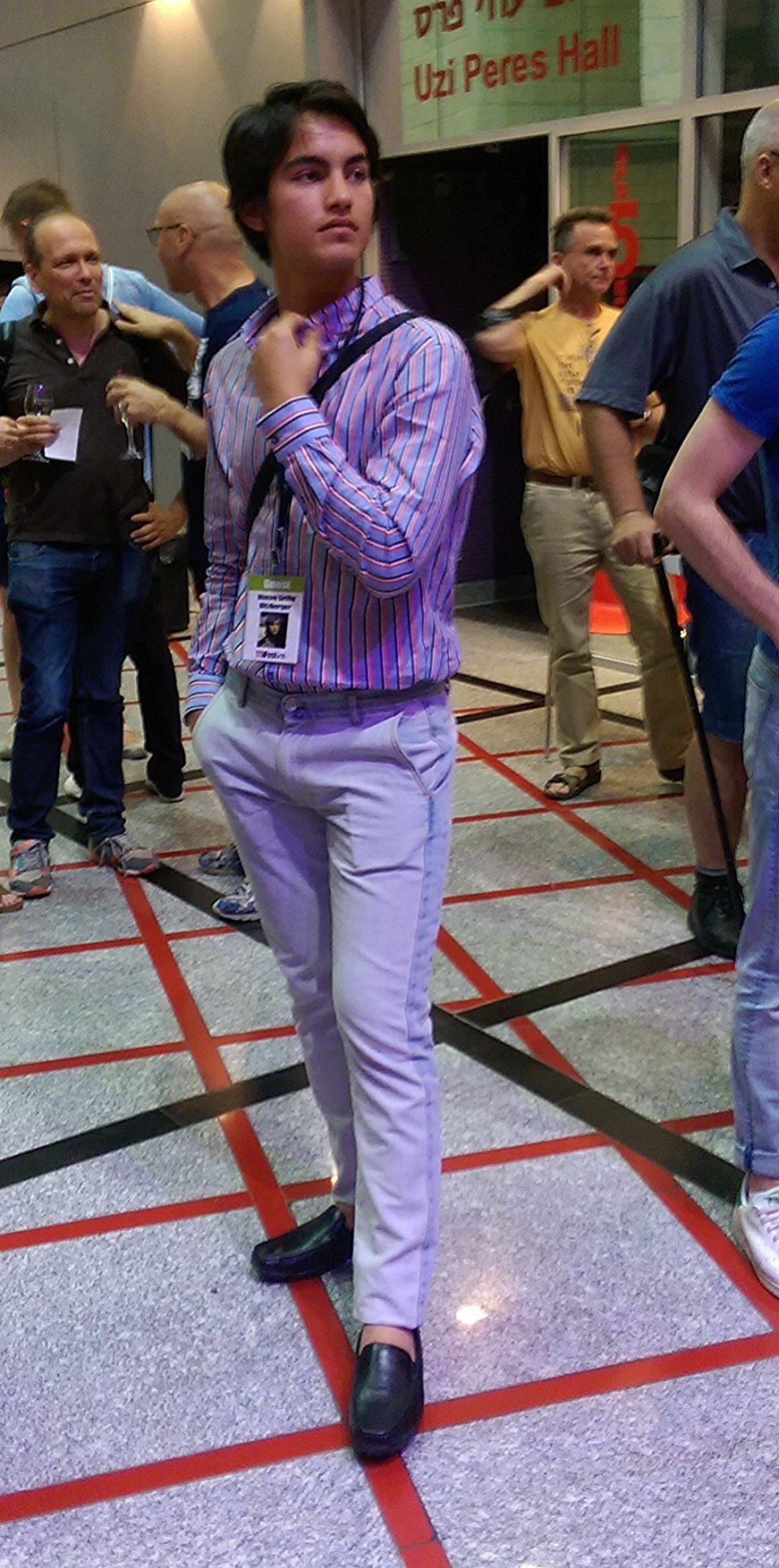
Rimau Grillo Ritzberger at TLVFest closing night Israeli premier of the film

Antonio is a basketball player in a high school team, a rising star, but it doesn't make him popular in his school, which is in a small northern Italian town. He is a closeted kid, spending most of the time silent and grieving over his older brother's death. Most of his teammates consider him dumb. Blu is a sharp and smart girl, who, after being discovered to have had sex with her boyfriend and three of his friends at the same time, is fighting with graffiti that is sprayed on the school walls, which calls her a slut. The new kid, Lorenzo, is openly gay. He has just been adopted from an orphanage in Turin and guards himself with extravagant behaviour and an extreme sense of fashion. The three teenagers start an unusual, but good friendship, fighting against bullying schoolmates with immense success. But, then, one single kiss changes their future, leading to a great tragedy.

== Cast ==
- Rimau Grillo Ritzberger as Lorenzo
- Valentina Romani as Blu
- Leonardo Pazzagli as Antonio
- Simonetta Solder as Blu's mother
- Giorgio Marchesi as Blu's father
- Thomas Trabacchi as Lorenzo's father
- Susy Laude as Lorenzo's mother
- Laura Mazzi as Antonio's mother
- Sergio Romano as Antonio's father
- Alessandro Sperduti as Massimo

== Release ==
=== Film festivals ===
- Seattle International Film Festival. 31 May 2016.
- Tel Aviv International LGBT Film Festival. 7 June 2016.

== Awards and nominations ==
- Nastro d'Argento. 2016.
- Guglielmo Biraghi Award. for Rimau Grillo Ritzberger, Valentina Romani, Leonardo Pazzagli and Alessandro Sperduti.
