= Grande Fratello season 2 =

Season of television series

Grande Fratello
- Season 2
- Presented by: Daria Bignardi
- No. of days: 92
- No. of housemates: 16
- Winner: Flavio Montrucchio
- Runner-up: Emanuela "Lalla" Sempio

Release
- Original network: Canale 5
- Original release: 20 September – 20 December 2001

Season chronology
- ← Previous; Season 1 Next → Season 3

Grande Fratello 2 is the second season of the Italian version of the reality television franchise Big Brother. The show was produced by Endemol and aired from 20 September 2001 to 20 December 2001.

== Contestants ==
Housemates	Age	Birthplace	Occupation	Day entered	Day exited	Status
Flavio Montrucchio	26	Turin	Financial promoter	22	92	Winner
Emanuela "Lalla" Sempio	26	Milan	Bartender	22	92	Runner-up
Amata "Tati" Albero	21	Monopoli	Student	1	92	3rd Place
Francesco Maria Gagliardelli	30	Domodossola	Bartender	1	92	4th Place
Alessandro Luckas	26	Naples	Dentist	1	85	9th Evicted
Mascia Ferri	28	Ravenna	Bartender	1	78	8th Evicted
Filippo Romeo	25	Genoa	Bricklayer	1	71	7th Evicted
Eleonora Daniele	25	Padua	Banker	1; 3	1; 64	6th Evicted
Lorenzo Paolini	25	Arezzo	Fitness instructor	1	50	5th Evicted
Emanuela Potini	30	Ascoli Piceno	Chef	1	36	4th Evicted
Mathias Mougoue	27	Ngaoundéré, Cameroon	Student	1	29	3rd Evicted
Serena Donati	25	Viareggio	Businesswoman	1	15	2nd Evicted
Filippo Nardi	32	London, UK	Count	1	13	Walked
Laura Marinelli	25	Rome	Student	1	6	Walked
Luana Spagnolo	26	Wynigen, Switzerland	Unemployed	1	3	Ejected
Giacomo Bartolomei	33	Rome	Employee	1	1	1st Evicted

== Nominations table ==
	Week 1		Week 2	Week 4	Week 5	Week 7	Week 9	Week 10	Week 11	Week 12	Week 13 Final		Nominations received
	Male	Female	Week 2	Week 4	Week 5	Week 7	Week 9	Week 10	Week 11	Week 12	Week 13 Final		Nominations received
Flavio	Not in House			Exempt	Eleonora, Lalla, Lorenzo	Lalla, Lorenzo, Tati	Eleonora, Lalla, Tati	Alessandro, Lalla, Tati	Francesco, Lalla, Tati	Francesco, Lalla, Tati	Winner (Day 92)		19
Lalla	Not in House			Exempt	Emanuela, Flavio, Romeo	Alessandro, Flavio, Romeo	Alessandro, Flavio, Romeo	Flavio, Mascia, Romeo	Alessandro, Flavio, Mascia	Alessandro, Flavio, Francesco	Runner-Up (Day 92)		27
Tati	Mathias	No nomination	Emanuela, Lorenzo, Serena	Emanuela, Mathias, Romeo	Alessandro, Lalla, Romeo	Alessandro, Flavio, Romeo	Alessandro, Flavio, Romeo	Alessandro, Flavio, Mascia	Alessandro, Flavio, Mascia	Alessandro, Flavio, Francesco	Third place (Day 92)		25
Francesco	No nomination	Eleonora	Alessandro, Eleonora, Mascia	Lorenzo, Romeo, Tati	Alessandro, Romeo, Tati	Eleonora, Lorenzo, Tati	Eleonora, Lalla, Tati	Flavio, Mascia, Romeo	Flavio, Mascia, Tati	Alessandro, Flavio, Lalla	Fourth place (Day 92)		9
Alessandro	No nomination	Eleonora	Emanuela, Romeo, Serena	Emanuela, Romeo, Tati	Lalla, Lorenzo, Tati	Eleonora, Lorenzo, Tati	Eleonora, Lalla, Tati	Lalla, Romeo, Tati	Francesco, Lalla, Tati	Francesco, Lalla, Tati	Evicted (Day 85)		23
Mascia	Mathias	No nomination	Eleonora, Francesco, Lorenzo	Lorenzo, Mathias, Romeo	Lalla, Lorenzo, Romeo	Lalla, Lorenzo, Romeo	Eleonora, Lalla, Tati	Lalla, Romeo, Tati	Francesco, Lalla, Tati	Evicted (Day 78)			9
Romeo	No nomination	Eleonora	Eleonora, Lorenzo, Tati	Eleonora, Emanuela, Lorenzo	Alessandro, Emanuela, Lalla	Lalla, Lorenzo, Mascia	Eleonora, Lalla, Tati	Alessandro, Lalla, Tati	Evicted (Day 71)				25
Eleonora	Not eligible	Nominated	Emanuela, Romeo, Serena	Lorenzo, Mathias, Romeo	Emanuela, Flavio, Lalla	Alessandro, Flavio, Lalla	Alessandro, Flavio, Francesco	Re-evicted (Day 64)					18
Lorenzo	No nomination	Luana	Eleonora, Filippo, Romeo	Eleonora, Emanuela, Romeo	Alessandro, Emanuela, Lalla	Alessandro, Flavio, Romeo	Evicted (Day 50)						17
Emanuela	Giancarlo	No nomination	Alessandro, Eleonora, Tati	Lorenzo, Mathias, Romeo	Flavio, Lalla, Romeo	Evicted (Day 36)							12
Mathias	Nominated	Not eligible	Eleonora, Filippo, Serena	Alessandro, Eleonora, Mascia	Evicted (Day 29)								4
Serena	Giancarlo	No nomination	Alessandro, Eleonora, Tati	Evicted (Day 15)									5
Filippo	No nomination	Eleonora	Emanuela, Lorenzo, Serena	Walked (Day 13)									2
Laura	Giancarlo	No nomination	Walked (Day 6)										N/A
Luana	Not eligible	Nominated	Ejected (Day 3)										N/A
Giancarlo	Nominated	Evicted (Day 1)											N/A
Notes	1	2	none								3		
Nominated For Eviction	Mathias, Giancarlo	Eleonora, Luana	Eleonora, Emanuela, Lorenzo, Serena	Eleonora, Lorenzo, Mathias, Romeo	Alessandro, Emanuela, Lalla, Romeo	Alessandro, Flavio, Lalla, Lorenzo, Romeo	Eleonora, Lalla, Tati	Lalla, Romeo, Tati	Flavio, Francesco, Lalla, Mascia, Tati	Alessandro, Flavio, Francesco, Lalla	Flavio, Francesco, Lalla, Tati		
Walked	none	Laura	Filippo	none									
Ejected	none	Luana	none										
Evicted	Giancarlo; 3 of 5 votes to evict	Eleonora; 4 of 5 votes to evict	Serena; 27.1% to evict	Mathias; 33.1% to evict	Emanuela; 57% to evict	Lorenzo; 58.4% to evict	Eleonora; 44.6% to evict	Romeo; 42.1% to evict	Mascia; 48.9% to evict	Alessandro; 57% to evict	Francesco; 14% to win	Tati; 18.7% to win	
Evicted	Giancarlo; 3 of 5 votes to evict	Eleonora; 4 of 5 votes to evict	Serena; 27.1% to evict	Mathias; 33.1% to evict	Emanuela; 57% to evict	Lorenzo; 58.4% to evict	Eleonora; 44.6% to evict	Romeo; 42.1% to evict	Mascia; 48.9% to evict	Alessandro; 57% to evict	Lalla; 27.7% to win		
Survived	Mathias; 2 of 5 votes to evict	Luana; 1 of 5 votes to evict	Emanuela; 26.8% Lorenzo; 24.6% Eleonora; 21.5%	Lorenzo; 32.5% Eleonora; 19% Romeo; 15.4%	Alessandro; Lalla; Romeo	Alessandro; Flavio; Lalla; Romeo	Tati; 40.4% Lalla; 15%	Lalla; Tati	Francesco; 23.4% Tati; 12.1% Flavio; 11.4% Lalla; 4.3%	Flavio; Francesco; Lalla	Flavio; 39.6% to win		

=== Notes ===
- ^Note 1: The boys had to each vote to evict either Eleonora & Luana. Eleonora received the most evict votes and she was evicted. The girls had to each vote to evict either Giancarlo or Mathias. Giancarlo received the most evict votes and he was evicted.
- ^Note 2: Eleonora re-entered the house as a replacement for Luana.
- ^Note 3: For the final week, the public were voting to win, rather than to evict.

== TV Ratings ==
Episode	Date	Viewers	Share
1	20 September 2001	7,911,000	33,04%
2	27 September 2001	7,488,000	30,06%
3	4 October 2001	7,649,000	31,30%
4	11 October 2001	7,556,000	31,09%
5	18 October 2001	7,859,000	32,06%
6	25 October 2001	7,649,000	31,05%
7	1º November 2001	6,992,000	29,95%
8	8 November 2001	8,167,000	32,32%
9	15 November 2001	8,006,000	31,51%
10	22 November 2001	none	
11	29 November 2001	8,414,000	32,53%
12	6 December 2001	8,654,000	33,82%
Semifinal	13 December 2001	none	
Final	20 December 2001	10,990,000	44,18%
Average		8,111,000	32,74%
