= Donna Detective =

- Genre: Police procedural; Crime drama
- Created by: Cinzia Torrini
- Starring: Lucrezia Lante della Rovere; Kaspar Capparoni; Sara Santostasi; Luca Ward; Massimiliano Benvenuto; Flavio Montrucchio; Anna Ammirati; Stefano Masciarelli; Helene Nardini; Manuela Maletta; Toni Garrani; Ralph Palka; Luis Molteni
- Country of origin: Italy
- Original language: Italian
- No. of seasons: 2
- No. of episodes: 22

Production
- Running time: 55-100 minutes

Original release
- Network: Rai 1
- Release: November 25, 2007 – June 1, 2010

Donna Detective is an Italian police procedural television series.

== See also ==
- List of Italian television series
