= Kryptonite! =

2011 film

- Film poster
- Directed by: Ivan Cotroneo
- Written by: Monica Rametta; Ivan Cotroneo; Ludovica Rampoldi
- Starring: Valeria Golino: Cristiana Capotondi; Luca Zingaretti; Libero De Rienzo; Fabrizio Gifuni
- Cinematography: Luca Bigazzi
- Edited by: Giogiò Franchini
- Music by: Pasquale Catalano
- Release date: 4 November 2011
- Running time: 98 minutes
- Country: Italy
- Language: Italian

Kryptonite! (Italian: La kryptonite nella borsa) is a 2011 Italian comedy film directed by Ivan Cotroneo.

== Cast ==
- Valeria Golino as Rosaria
- Cristiana Capotondi as Titina
- Luca Zingaretti as Antonio
- Antonia Truppo as Valeria
- Libero De Rienzo as Salvatore
- Luigi Catani as Peppino
- Vincenzo Nemolato as Gennaro
- Monica Nappo as Assunta
- Massimiliano Gallo as Arturo
- Lucia Ragni as Carmela
- Gennaro Cuomo as Federico
- Sergio Solli as Vincenzo
- Anita Caprioli as Madonna
- Fabrizio Gifuni as Matarrese

== Awards ==
Awards
Award	Category	Recipients and nominees	Result
67th Silver Ribbon Awards	Best Comedy	Ivan Cotroneo	Nominated
67th Silver Ribbon Awards	Best Actress	Valeria Golino	Nominated
67th Silver Ribbon Awards	Best Costumes	Rossano Marchi	Nominated
57th David di Donatello Awards	Best Actress	Valeria Golino	Nominated
57th David di Donatello Awards	Best Supporting Actress	Cristiana Capotondi	Nominated
57th David di Donatello Awards	Best Costumes	Rossano Marchi	Nominated
57th David di Donatello Awards	Best Make Up	Maurizio Fazzini	Nominated
57th David di Donatello Awards	Best Hairstyling	Mauro Tamagnini	Nominated
52nd Globi d'oro	Best Actress	Valeria Golino	Nominated
28th Ciak d'oro	Best Actress	Valeria Golino	Won
28th Ciak d'oro	Best Cinematography	Fabio Cianchetti	Won
28th Ciak d'oro	Best Costumes	Rossano Marchi	Won
