= La porta rossa =

2017 Italian noir television series

- Season 1 DVD cover
- Italian: La porta rossa
- Genre: Noir
- Created by: Carlo Lucarelli; Giampiero Rigosi
- Screenplay by: Carlo Lucarelli; Giampiero Rigosi; Sofia Assirelli; Michele Cogo (s. 1–2); Davide Orsini (s. 2–3)
- Directed by: Carmine Elia (s. 1–2); Gianpaolo Tescari (s. 3)
- Starring: Lino Guanciale; Gabriella Pession; Valentina Romani
- Music by: Stefano Lentini
- Opening theme: It's Not Impossible by Stefano Lentini and Charlie Winston
- Country of origin: Italy
- Original language: Italian
- No. of seasons: 3
- No. of episodes: 32

Production
- Executive producer: Stefania Balduini (s. 3)
- Producers: Anouk Andaloro (Rai); Maurizio Tini (VelaFilm, s. 1–2: Garbo, s. 3); Michele Zatta (Rai, s. 1); Luigi Mariniello (Rai, s. 1–2); Tommaso Dazzi (VelaFilm, s. 1–2); Giulio Luciani (Rai, s. 3); Maite Carpio (Garbo, s. 3)
- Cinematography: Roberto Cimatti (s. 1–2); Alessandro Pesci (s. 1); Marcello Montarsi (s. 3)
- Editors: Lorenzo Fanfani (s. 1); Marco Garavaglia (s. 2); Alessio Rivellino (s. 3)
- Running time: 50–60 minutes
- Production companies: Rai Fiction; VelaFilm (s. 1–2); Garbo Produzioni (s. 3)

Original release
- Network: Rai 2
- Release: February 22, 2017 – February 1, 2023

La porta rossa ([la ˈpɔrta ˈrossa], lit. 'The Red Door') is an Italian noir television series created by Carlo Lucarelli and Giampiero Rigosi for Rai Fiction. It premiered on Rai 2 on February 22, 2017 and concluded on February 1, 2023, having aired 32 episodes over three seasons.

The pilot episode attracted the largest audience of the night, amassing 3.284 million viewers, more than double the network average at the time. The series was praised for being "the only [Italian] mainstream TV crime series that resembles genre literature and not a mainstream TV drama", its "modern and demanding" visuals and dark setting, but its second season was criticized as "excessively distressing".

== Series overview ==
Trieste. Leonardo Cagliostro (Lino Guanciale), an impulsive police commissioner not at all inclined to follow procedures and directives dictated by his superiors, is investigating the most difficult case of his career: his own murder.

In fact, Cagliostro was killed during a solitary police action, but, instead of walking through the red door leading to the afterlife, he chose to stay in the earthly world, thus becoming a ghost, to find his killer: this is the only way he'll be able to save his estranged wife, magistrate Anna Mayer (Gabriella Pession), who, according to some visions that Cagliostro has been having since his death, will be murdered by the same killer during the Christmas season. He is helped by Vanessa Rosic (Valentina Romani), a 17-year-old student who finds out she can communicate with the dead and is the only one who can see and hear him, and Jonas Sala (Andrea Bosca), a fellow ghost who helps Cagliostro to get used to his new condition.

Cagliostro soon finds out that his killer, most likely, is one of his colleagues, who would therefore be leading a double life linked to the trafficking of a new lethal drug plaguing Trieste, the Red Ghost, that the commissioner was investigating just before being killed. However, all of his colleagues seem to have something to hide and therefore are all possible suspects. Even Antonio Piras (Ettore Bassi), Anna's colleague who has always been in love with her and always harbored a mutual, ill-concealed hatred towards Cagliostro, and Anna's father, Elvio (Tommaso Ragno), who never approved of their wedding, seem to have skeletons in their closets.

== Cast and characters ==
=== Main ===
- Lino Guanciale as Leonardo "Leo" Cagliostro: an impulsive police commissioner
- Gabriella Pession as Anna Mayer: Cagliostro's magistrate wife
- Valentina Romani as Vanessa Rosic: a 17-year-old high school student who can communicate with the dead

=== Recurring ===
- Gaetano Bruno as Diego Paoletto: policeman and Cagliostro's colleague
- Elena Radonicich as Stella Mariani: policewoman and Cagliostro's former lover
- Pierpaolo Spollon as Filip Vesna: Vanessa's friend
- Cecilia Dazzi as Eleonora Pavesi: Vanessa's mother
- Alessia Barela as Stefania Pavesi: Vanessa's aunt
- Lavinia Longhi as Beatrice Mayer: Anna's sister
- Daniela Scarlatti as Adele Mayer: Anna's mother
- Antonio Gerardi as Stefano Rambelli (seasons 1–2): deputy commissioner who was like a father figure to Cagliostro
- Fausto Sciarappa as Valerio Lorenzi (seasons 1–2): Cagliostro's colleague and best friend
- Ettore Bassi as Antonio Piras (seasons 1–2): Anna's colleague
- Pia Lanciotti as Patrizia Durante (seasons 1–2): Raffaele's mother
- Paola Benocci as Caterina Lorenzi (seasons 1–2): Valerio's wife
- Massimo Palazzini as don Giulio Giannini (seasons 1–2): priest and Valerio Lorenzi's confessor
- Tommaso Ragno as Elvio Mayer (seasons 1–2): Anna's father
- Andrea Bosca as Jonas Sala (seasons 1–2): a ghost who helps Cagliostro after his death. Cagliostro's biological father
- Carmine Recano as Federico (season 2): waiter and Vanessa's friend, also able to communicate with the dead
- Ivan Zerbinati as Albertini (seasons 2–3)
- Raniero Monaco di Lapio as Raffaele Gherardi (season 1): a rich guy who dates Vanessa for a while. He is killed by Rambelli
- Roberto Gudese as Davide Rambelli (season 1): Stefano's son
- Yuliya Mayarchuk as Helena Cassian (season 1): stripper and Cagliostro's former informant
- Catrinel Marlon as Helke (season 1): Piras's girlfriend
- Valentina Munafò as Federica (season 1-3): Vanessa's former best friend and Filip's girlfriend
- Federica Girardello as Ilaria (season 1): Vanessa's friend
- Sandra Franzo as Mrs. Raspadori (season 1)
- Edoardo Ribatto as Eugenio Pertusi "il Messicano" (lit. 'The Mexican') (season 1): drug trafficker
- Santo Bellina as Michele Rizzo (season 1): drug trafficker
- Sergio Leone as Ragusa (season 1)
- Fortunato Cerlino as Marco Jamonte (season 2): deputy commissioner
- Antonia Liskova as Silvia Pes (season 2): Jonas's girlfriend. Cagliostro's biological mother
- Raffaella Rea as Lucia Bugatti (season 2): journalist and Paoletto's lover
- Alessandro Averone as Matteo Silvestrin (season 2): Enrico's son
- Benedetta Cimatti as Erika Jamonte (season 2): Marco Jamonte's daughter
- Claudio Corinaldesi as Mauro Brezigar (season 2): criminal
- Ivan Franek as Emin Vesna (season 2): Filip's father
- Fausto Russo Alesi as Attorney Scaglianti (season 2): Rambelli's defense lawyer
- Luciano Virgilio as Renato Silvestrin (season 2)
- Anita Kravos as Lana Vesna (season 2): Filip's mother
- Giorgia Senesi as Doctor Poropat (season 2)
- Alessandro Mizzi as Zagaria (season 2)
- Anna Melato as Regina (season 2)
- Fulvio Falzarano as Judge Tagliaferri (season 2)
- Leonardo De Colle as Cesare (season 2)
- Eugenio Papalia (season 2)
- Linda Gennari as Daria (season 2): Paoletto's wife
- Francesco Migliaccio as Bepin (season 2)
- Alessandro Piavani (season 2)
- Michel Schermi as Josif Struna (season 2)
- Veronika Logan as Deputy prosecutor Longhi (season 2)
- Roberto Citran as Vittorio Alessi (season 2): prosecutor
- Paolo Mazzarelli as Luka Levani (season 3): custodian of the Parapsychology Study Center
- Nicola Pannelli as Professor Gabriele Braida (season 3)
- Roberto Zibetti as Ludovico Muric (season 3)
- Mauro Cardinali as Special commissioner Piero Furlan (season 3)
- Katia Greco as Inspector Simona Barbieri (season 3)
- Eugenio Krilov as Andrea Donda (season 3): Stella's stepbrother
- Alessandro Schiavo as Giordano (season 3)
- Giulia Sangiorgi as Ksenja Muric (season 3): Vanessa's new best friend
- Leonardo Ghini as Niccolò Muric (season 3)
- Francesco Bovara as Vittorio (season 3)
- Giusy Frallonardo as Prosecutor Camporesi (season 3)
- Francesco Gusmitta as Amalteo (season 3)
- Emma Abrami as Vanessa Cagliostro (season 3): Leonardo and Anna's daughter

== Episodes ==
Season	Episodes	Originally released	
Season	Episodes	First released	Last released
1	12	February 22, 2017	March 22, 2017
2	12	February 13, 2019	March 20, 2019
3	8	January 11, 2023	February 1, 2023

== Production ==
The series production started in 2015, and its working title was La verità di Anna (lit. 'Anna's Truth'). Creator Carlo Lucarelli described the writing process as particularly long, because "we were told it was too thriller, too little melodramatic, too fantasy or too little fantasy". Originally set in Turin, Piedmont, it was moved to Trieste, Friuli-Venezia Giulia, at the suggestion of director Carmine Elia, who had already shot a movie there in 2003. Screenwriters Giampiero Rigosi and Sofia Assirelli visited the city in October 2015 to adapt the script to the setting. Filming took place from February 29 to July 9, 2016 in locations such as the Porto Vecchio, the Melara district, Piazza Unità d'Italia and the Canal Grande, while a mountain scene was filmed for two days in Ravascletto. La porta rossa marked Lino Guanciale's first leading role. To play Cagliostro, the actor rewatched The Sixth Sense and River, and reread Thomas Mann and Fyodor Dostoevsky, likening his character to Ivan Karamazov "who gets crazy when he cannot give himself a logical explanation of the world".

Originally planned to last for one season only, it was renewed thanks to the positive audience reception, with Rai Fiction director Eleonora Andreatta confirming there would be a second season the day after the broadcast of the first season finale. The script reading was held on May 21, 2018, while filming took place from May 28 to October 20 in Trieste and at the Angoris Estate in Cormons.

The third and final season, directed by Gianpaolo Tescari, was confirmed on January 24, 2019 when Trieste and the FVG Film Commission renewed their collaboration to film movies, TV series and documentaries in the city. Lino Guanciale further confirmed it on March 20, breaking his own rule of leaving a series after two seasons. Filming was supposed to start in January 2020, but was postponed because of the COVID-19 lockdowns in Italy. It ultimately took place from August 30 to December 8, 2021. Filming locations included Palazzo Carciotti as the police headquarters, the Porto Vecchio, the Opicina power plant, Palazzo Vivante, the bathing establishment Ausonia in Trieste, and the Rupinpiccolo quarry in Sgonico. Later in July it was confirmed as part of the 2022–23 Rai television schedule: it started airing on January 11.

== Original soundtrack ==
The series soundtrack is composed by Stefano Lentini and performed by the RAI National Symphony Orchestra conducted by Emanuele Bossi. It was mixed at Air Studios by Geoff Foster and mastered by John Webber. The opening theme It's Not Impossible was composed by Stefano Lentini and Charlie Winston. The soundtrack albums for the first two seasons were made available for digital download, and a CD was included in each season DVD box.

The soundtrack for the third season was performed by the Rome Orchestra and released digitally on January 11, 2023. Amongst its 14 tracks, the album includes a new version of the opening theme It's Not Impossible and a remastering by Lentini of the second movement from Beethoven's Symphony No. 7.

== Reception ==
=== Critical response ===
La Repubblica's Antonio Dipollina opined that La porta rossa is "the only [Italian] mainstream TV crime series that resembles genre literature and not a mainstream TV drama". Vanity Fair Italia's Mario Manca wrote that the series, characterized by "intrigues to unravel, pending loves to clarify and a quadrille of twists to cushion", "stage[s] a story of borders, of limits, of universes and of conflicts like we haven't seen in a long time. The adventures of the Ghost-style ghost played by Lino Guanciale, strong and magnetic even though transparent and in the form of an ectoplasm, in fact, possess something magical, a sort of intrinsic strength". TVBlog's Paolo Stura believed that "[its] ability to masterfully blend supernatural and crime without damaging none of the two genres is something that must serve as a lesson to those who want to propose stories with a new flavour".

Movieplayer's Stefano Cocci gave the first season 3.5 stars out of 5, defining it as "an important experiment in the production landscape of Italian fiction". He praised the "modern and demanding" visuals and the narrative that "plays on the alternation of thriller, noir, romance and fantasy, often finding a resource in the alternating editing that underlines the highlight of each episode. Actors and actresses often move at night in a Trieste whipped by wind and rain, while the dark places of the characters' souls twist in the half-light where nothing is what it seems."

DavideMaggio.it's Stefania Stefanelli criticized the second season plot as "forced, complex and excessively distressing". Avvenire's Andrea Fagioli wrote that "the series novelty [...] had already run out a bit with its second season", and that the story "needed to be renewed with less action, more introspection, studies of characters' psychology and new mysteries".

=== Ratings ===
The series premiere of La porta rossa on February 22, 2017 was the most watched program of the night, amassing 3.284 million viewers, or a 13% rating, more than double the network average. The ratings continued to rise episode after episode, and the penultimate one of the first season recorded a 14.4% viewership rating with 3.399 million viewers. The series was one of the most streamed programs on RaiPlay as well. Its audience was mainly composed of females (63%), while 62% of the viewers were over 55.

The second season premiered on February 13, 2019 as one of the most anticipated shows of the year, amassing 3.043 million viewers, or a 12.5% rating. Compared to the first season, it recorded slightly lower ratings, also affected by the simultaneous broadcasting of the football championships on Rai 1, and the finale was watched by 2.807 million viewers (a 12.4% viewership rating).

The third season started airing three years later, with its premiere recording an 8.01% rating for 1.577 million viewers, a good result considering the changed viewers' habits and TV ratings since its premiere. The series finale achieved a 6.9% rating for 1.341 millions viewers.

Viewership and ratings per season of La porta rossa
Season	Episodes	First aired		Last aired		Avg. viewers (millions)
Season	Episodes	Date	Viewers (millions)	Date	Viewers (millions)	Avg. viewers (millions)
1	12	February 22, 2017	3.284	March 22, 2017	3.471	TBD
2	12	February 13, 2019	3.043	March 20, 2019	2.807	TBD
3	8	January 11, 2023	1.577	February 1, 2023	1.341	TBD

=== Accolades ===
La porta rossa won an award at the 2018 ShorTS International Film Festival for promoting Trieste in Italy and worldwide. Its soundtrack was a contender for Best Original Score and Best Song for Film at the 2017 Tenerife International Film Music Festival.

== Home media releases ==
The first two seasons were released on DVD in Region 2. They include behind-the-scenes featurettes, a photo gallery, a videoclip, and the original soundtrack CD.
