= Valentina Romani =

Italian actress (born 1996)

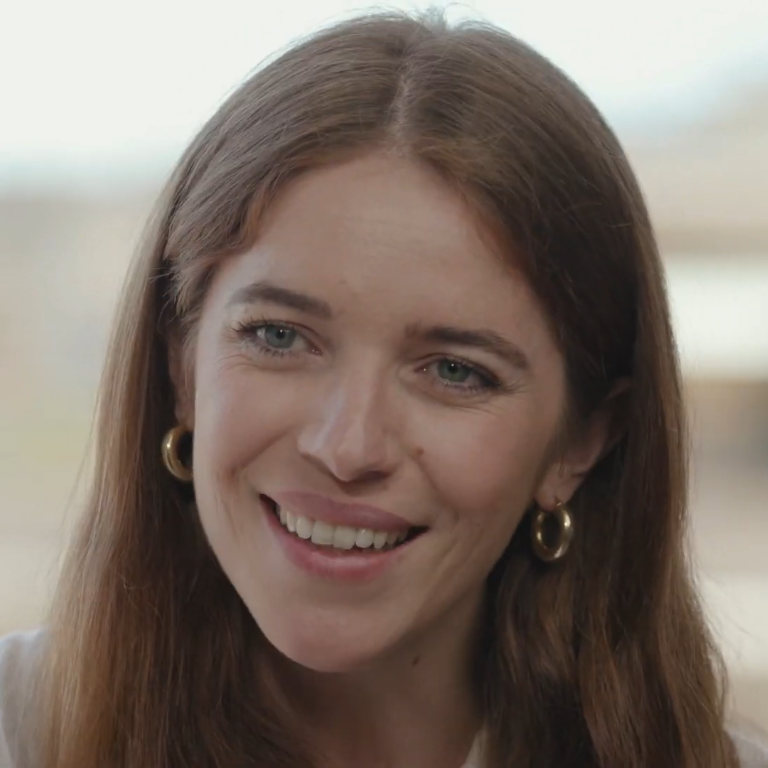
- Romani in 2024
- Born: 16 June 1996 (age 30); Rome, Italy
- Occupation: Actress
- Years active: 2014–present

Valentina Romani (Italian pronunciation: [va.lenˈti.na roˈma.ni]; born 16 June 1996) is an Italian actress. She is best known for playing Vanessa Rosic in the noir television series The Red Door (2017–2023) and Naditza in the crime drama television series The Sea Beyond (2020–2023).

== Biography ==
Romani was born in Rome to a family of athletes. She began acting at the age of six and also practised ballet for 13 years. Unlike her character Naditza in The Sea Beyond, she does not play the piano. In addition to acting, she also studies communications at university. In May 2024, her first novel, Guarda che è vero, was published by Rizzoli Libri.

== Filmography ==
=== Film ===
Year	Title	Role	Notes	Ref.
2016	One Kiss	Blu		
2020	White Snow	Stefania Belmondo		
2021	Carla	Anita Spelta	Television film	
2023	A Brighter Tomorrow	Emma		
2023	Elemental	Ember Lumen	Italian dub	
2025	Alla festa della rivoluzione			
TBA	Frammenti			
TBA	Un eroe italiano			

=== Television ===
Year	Title	Role	Notes	Ref.
2014	Che Dio ci aiuti		1 episode	
2015	Un passo dal cielo		1 episode	
2015	Fuoriclasse		1 episode	
2015	Questo è il mio paese	Chiara Ferrari	6 episodes	
2016	Tutto può succedere	Giada	10 episodes	
2017–2023	The Red Door	Vanessa Rosic	26 episodes	
2018	Skam Italia	Maria	3 episodes	
2018	Thou Shalt Not Kill	Laura DeCarolis	1 episode	
2018	Aldo Moro - Il professore	Lucia	Television film	
2020–2021	The Sea Beyond	Naditza	24 episodes	
2021	Alfredino - Una storia italiana	Laura Bortolani	2 episodes	
2023	Bardot	Peggy	4 episodes	
2023	Noi siamo leggenda	Lara	12 episodes	
2024	Everything Calls for Salvation	Angelica		
2024	Mike	Daniela Zuccoli	4 episodes	
2025	Gerri	Lea Coen		
2025	Natale senza Babbo	Santa Lucia	Television film	

=== Music videos ===
Year	Title	Artist	Role	Ref.
2016	"Hurts"	Mika	Herself	
2023	"Due"	Elodie	Herself	

== Awards and nominations ==
Award	Year	Category	Nominated work	Result	Ref.
Biraghi Award	2016	Best Young Actress	One Kiss	Won	
Ciak d'Oro Serie TV	2023	Best Audience Protagonist Under 30	The Red Door; The Sea Beyond	Nominated	
Giffoni Film Festival	2022	Explosive Talent Award		Won	
Penisola Sorrentina Award	2018	Best Leading Actress	Aldo Moro il professore	Won	

== Bibliography ==
- Romani, Valentina (2024). Guarda che è vero (in Italian). Rizzoli. ISBN 978-8817188241.
