= Super Naim Experience =

EP by Stefano Lentini and Laura Polimeno
- Released: September 30, 1999
- Genre: Folk, new-age, acoustic
- Length: 24:00
- Language: English, French, Spanish
- Producer: Stefano Lentini and Laura Polimeno

Super Naim Experience is the first Stefano Lentini album. Produced in 1999 by Lentini and Laura Polimeno. It is a collection of poems by Emily Dickinson, Samuel Beckett and Federico García Lorca, with original music by Lentini.

The album was released in September 1999 with the collaboration of klezmer musicians from the band Klezroym and the Kurdish percussionist, Mhossen Kassirosafar.

Regarding Super Naim Experience, Lentini said, "I was trying to create a new route for classical Lieder into a popular, folkish way."

== Track listing ==
1. "E.D." - 5:53
2. "Ye Mariners All" - 2:53
3. "Medley 1943/Dieppe/Saint-Lo" - 2:56
4. "Mrs. Gloom" - 5:35
5. "Maggio/Trasmundo" - 6:42

== Personnel ==
- Production
  - Paolo Modugno - recording and mixing
  - Stefano Lentini and Laura Polimeno - producers
- Performing artists
  - Stefano Lentini - acoustic guitars
  - Laura Polimeno - vocal
  - Andrea pandolfo - trumpet
  - Pasquale Laino - saxophone
  - Mhossen Kassirosafar - daf, zarb
