= Stabat Mater (album) =

Studio album by Stefano Lentini
- Released: October 7, 2013
- Length: 40:11
- Label: Milan Records
- Producer: Stefano Lentini, Emmanuel Chamboredon

Stefano Lentini chronology
Bakhita (2009)	Stabat Mater (2013)

Professional ratings
Review scores
Source	Rating
Spin magazine	7/10 stars
Corriere della Sera	(7.6/10)
Variety	6/10 stars

Stabat Mater is the sixth full-length album by Stefano Lentini. It was released on October 8, 2013. The single 'Stabat Mater' is a part of the soundtrack of Wong Kar Wai's The Grandmaster, 2014 Oscar Nominee. In an interview with the Pitchfork website, Lentini said: Sacred music is generally only referred to music based on religious texts. I think this is wrong. Any kind of music able to convey some Truth about existence should be regarded as “sacred”. It is neither a matter of sound nor of musical instrument. It is not a genre, but an attitude: whether it is symphonic or indie music, if there is some inner truth in it, a profound expressive intensity, then there’s sacredness. Whatever is human is necessarily sacred, because humanity always deserves to be respected and honoured. Before being “sacred” for its text, my Stabat Mater is mundanely sacred for the emotions it hopefully arouses.

== Track listing ==
All songs written by Stefano Lentini

1. "Stabat Mater" – 3:02
2. "Eight Sisters" – 6:16
3. "Alma" – 2:31
4. "Alma - Coda" – 3:10
5. "Viele Kleine" – 5:02
6. "Ave Maria" – 3:37
7. "Estrella Apagada" – 5:35
8. "Metamorphoseon" – 3:01
9. "Metamorphosis Outro" – 1:25
10. "Stabat Mater (Piano Suite)" – 6:24

== Personnel ==
- The City of Rome Contemporary Music Ensemble - orchestra
- Sandra Pastrana - soprano
- Stefano Lentini - piano, guitar, pipa
- Eunice Cangianiello - violin
- Luca Peverinii - cello
- Rossano Baldini - piano
- Marco Gonella - piano
- Paolo Innarella - bansuri
- Pasquale Laino - sax
- Antonella Capurso - choir
- Antonella - choir
- Adriano Caroletti - choir
- Giuseppe Nicodemo - choir
- Pierpaolo Giordano - choir
- Lur Mahazar - choir
