= Flavio Montrucchio =

Italian actor (born 1975)

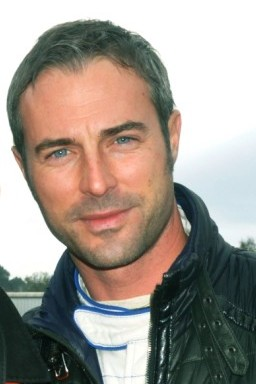
- Born: 15 May 1975 (age 51); Turin, Italy
- Occupations: Actor; television presenter

Flavio Montrucchio (born 15 May 1975 in Turin) is an Italian actor and television presenter.

== Biography ==
In 2001 he wins Grande Fratello (season 2). After that he is an actor both in television (CentoVetrine, Donna detective, Capri 2, Fidati di me, La nuova squadra 3, Baciati dall'amore, Provaci ancora prof! 4) and cinema (Si sente ca sono calabrese? Le avventure di Franco al Nord, 7/8 - Sette ottavi, Il soffio dell'anima, Una donna per amica).

Flavio Montrucchio is also a television host RAI, Discovery and Fox.

== Filmography ==
=== Films ===
Year	Title	Role(s)	Notes
2007	7/8 - Sette ottavi	Francesco	
2009	Il soffio dell'anima	Alex	
2014	A Woman as a Friend	Luca	

=== Televisione ===
Year	Title	Role(s)	Notes
2001	Grande Fratello	Himself / Contestant	Winner (season 2)
2002–2007	CentoVetrine	Alessandro Torre	Series regular
2007–2010	Donna Detective	Nanni Fortuna	Main role
2008	Capri	Federico Palmieri	Recurring role (season 2)
2008	Fidati di me	Paolo Sales	Miniseries
2011	La nuova squadra	Matteo Costa	Main role (season 3)
2011	Baciati dall'amore	Tommaso	Main role
2012	Tale e quale show	Himself / Contestant	Runner-up (season 2)
2012	Provaci ancora prof!	Paolo De Matteis	Main role (season 4)
2015	Zecchino d'Oro	Himself / Co-host	Singing competition
2016	Castrocaro Music Festival	Himself / Host	Singing competition
2017–2018	4 mamme	Himself / Host	Reality show
2019–present	Primo appuntamento	Himself / Host	Dating reality show
2020	Junior Bake Off Italia	Himself / Host	Cooking competition

== Theater ==
- Donna de Paradiso (2003)
- Un viaggiatore perso (2003)
- Grease (2004-2005)
- Aladin - Il musical (2011)
- Sette spose per sette fratelli (2014)

== Television ==
- Grande Fratello (season 2) (Canale 5, 2001)
- Tale e quale show 2 (Rai 1, 2012)
- Tale e quale show - Il torneo 1 (Rai 1, 2012)
- Tale e quale show - Duetti (Rai 1, 2013)
- Una notte per Caruso (Rai 1, 2014-2015)
- Techetechete' (Rai 1, 2015)
- Zecchino d'Oro (Rai 1, 2015)
- L'attesa (Rai 1, 2015)
- Castrocaro Music Festival (Rai 1, 2016)
- 4 mamme (Fox Life, 2017-2018)
- Primo appuntamento (Real Time, 2019–present)
- Bake Off Italia - All Stars Battle (Real Time, 2020)
- Junior Bake Off Italia (Real Time, 2020)
- Bake Off Italia - Dolci sotto un tetto (Real Time, 2021–present)
- Primo appuntamento Crociera (Discovery+, Real Time, 2021–present)
