= Ivan Cotroneo =

Italian writer and director

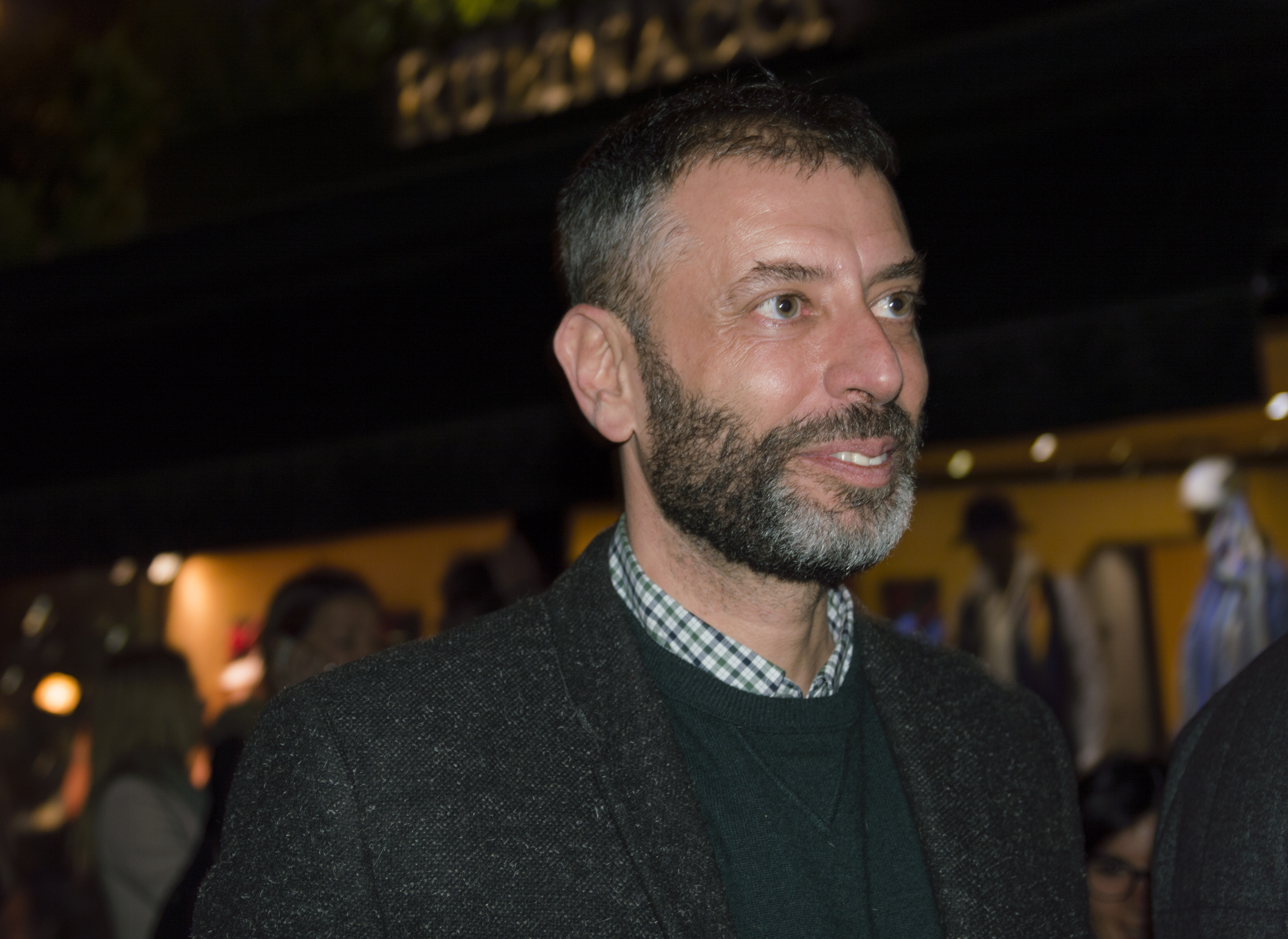
- Born: Naples, Italy
- Occupations: Writer, director, Scriptwriter
- Years active: 1997–present

Ivan Cotroneo is an Italian writer, scriptwriter, and director, known for I Am Love (2009), and Loose Cannons (2010), and his directorial debut feature film Kryptonite! (2011).

== Early life and education ==
After abandoning his law studies, Ivan Cotroneo moved to Rome, where he graduated in scriptwriting from the Experimental Center of Cinematography in 1992.

== Career ==
=== Film and television ===
Cotroneo's first experience in the film industry was working for the director Pappi Corsicato, for whom Cotroneo wrote the episode "La stirpe di Iana" of collective film The Vesuvians, and the screenplay for the feature film Chimera.

Cotroneo has worked as a writer for several television productions such as drama and TV miniseries on Italian television.

In 2009 he was a co-writer on I Am Love.

He co-wrote the screenplay of the film Loose Cannons with Ferzan Ozpetek in 2009. This screenplay won him Italian Golden Globe in 2010 for Best Screenplay. He was also nominated for David di Donatello and Silver Ribbon awards in 2010.

Cotroneo directed his first movie Kryptonite! in 2011. Cotroneo second directorial feature is the film One Kiss, based on his own book with the same name, released in Italian cinemas on March 31, 2016.

=== Other work ===
In addition to film and television, Cotroneo has also worked for stage productions. He adapted the Italian editions of Closer by Patrick Marber and The Rules of Attraction by Bret Easton Ellis.

He has also written comedy shows, including the Claudio Gioè monologue "If you are here tonight".

== Publications ==
Cotroneo published a collection of essays Il piccolo libro della rabbia (The Little Book of Anger) in 1999.

His first novel El re del mondo (The King of the World) was published in 2003.

== Partial filmography ==
=== Director and writer ===
- Kryptonite! (2011)
- Il Natale della mamma imperfetta (2013)
- One Kiss (2016)

=== Writer ===
- In the Beginning There Was Underwear (1999)
- Chimera (2001)
- Paz! (2002)
- Ginger and Cinnamon (2003)
- Piano, solo (2007)
- The Man Who Loves (2008)
- I Am Love (2009)
- The Front Line (2009)
- Loose Cannons (2010)
- A Five Star Life (2013)
- Me, Myself and Her (2015)

== Bibliography ==
- 1999 - Il piccolo libro della rabbia (The Little Book of Anger ), Bompiani, ISBN 88-452-4263-3
- 2003 - Il re del mondo (The King of the World ), Bompiani, ISBN 88-452-5390-2
- 2005 - Cronaca di un disamore (Chronicles of a Lack of Love ), Bompiani, ISBN 88-452-5982-X
- 2007 - La kryptonite nella borsa (Kryptonite!), Bompiani, ISBN 88-452-5988-9
- 2010 - Un bacio (One Kiss ), Bompiani, ISBN 978-88-452-6542-6
