= Patrick Mower =

English actor (born 1938)

- Born: Patrick Archibald Shaw; 12 September 1938 (age 88); Oxford, Oxfordshire, England
- Occupation: Actor
- Years active: 1964–present
- Spouse: Anya Pope (m. 1996)
- Children: 3

Patrick Mower (born Patrick Archibald Shaw; 12 September 1938) is an English actor. He is known for his portrayal of Rodney Blackstock in the ITV soap opera Emmerdale, a role he first played in 2000. Mower has appeared in a wide range of films and television series, including Swizzlewick, The Devil Rides Out, Monella, Callan, Special Branch and Target.

== Early life and education ==
Mower was born the youngest of three boys in Oxford, to a Welsh father and an English mother, Peggy. In his 2007 autobiography, Mower states that he believed for years that his year of birth was 1940, but later he discovered that his birth was not registered and he was born on 12 September 1938. After first training as an engineering draughtsman at the Cowley plant of Pressed Steel Company, Mower graduated from RADA.

== Career ==
Mower first came to prominence in the early 1970s, as the ruthless government assassin James Cross in the ITV spy series Callan. In 1970 he was offered to play Heathcliff, in the film Wuthering Heights (1970), but he was unavailable because he was busy filming Cry of the Banshee (1970). He then appeared as DCI Tom Haggerty in Special Branch, Det. Supt. Steve Hackett, the lead character in the police series Target, and featured in one of the last Carry On films, Carry On England. In the late 1960s, at the age of 28, Mower auditioned and was considered for the role of James Bond in the James Bond franchise. However, he was told that he was too young. Mower's television roles afterwards included guest appearances in Jason King, Space: 1999, UFO, Minder, The Sweeney and Bergerac. In October 2000, he made his first appearance as Rodney Blackstock in the ITV soap opera Emmerdale, a role he has portrayed since.

== Filmography ==
=== Film ===
Year	Title	Role	Notes
1968	The Devil Rides Out	Simon Aron	
1969	The Smashing Bird I Used to Know	Harry Spenton	
1970	Incense for the Damned	Richard Fountain	
1970	Cry of the Banshee	Roderick	
1971	Percy	James Vaile	
1971	Black Beauty	Sam Greener	
1971	To Catch a Spy	James Fenton	
1976	Carry On England	Sergeant Len Able	
1976	One Away	Tam Bass	
1977	The Devil's Advocate	Il Lupo	
1984	Escape from El Diablo		
1998	Monella	André	
2000	The Asylum	Dr. Adams	

=== Television ===
Year	Title	Role	Notes
1964	Swizzlewick	Kenneth Wiley	26 episodes
1964	Mary Barton	Harry Carson	2 episodes
1966	The Avengers	Duboys	Episode: "A Sense of History"
1967–1968	Haunted	Michael West	8 episodes
1970	UFO	Cass Fowler	Episode: "The Square Triangle"
1970	Mystery and Imagination	Malcolm Ross	Episode: "Curse of the Mummy"
1970–1972	Callan	Cross	14 episodes
1972	Jason King	Achille	Episode: "Nadine"
1973	The Protectors	Santana	1 episode
1973–1974	Special Branch	Detective Chief Inspector Tom Haggerty	16 episodes
1973-1978	Whodunnit?	Self (panelist)	16 episodes
1975	State of Emergency	Paul Frederick	3 episodes
1975	The Sweeney	Colin McGruder	2 episodes
1976	Space: 1999	Dave Reilly	Episode: "All That Glisters"
1977–1978	Target	Det. Supt. Steve Hackett	17 episodes
1981	Bergerac	Eddie St. Pierre	Episode: "Last Chance For A Loser"
1982–1983	Marco Polo	Brother Damian	6 episodes
1983	The Dark Side of the Sun	Don Tierney	6 episodes
1984	Tales Of The Unexpected	Walter	Episode: "The Last of the Midnight Gardeners"
1984	Minder	Clive Cosgrove	Episode: "A Number of Old Wives Tales"
1984	Hammer House of Mystery and Suspense	John Patrick Duncan	Episode: "Czech Mate"
1997	Chucklevision	Petrovich Liningrad	Episode: "The Perils of Petrovich"
2000–present	Emmerdale	Rodney Blackstock	Series regular
2001	Lily Savage's Blankety Blank		

== Radio ==
- The Shuttleworths, Open Mind, episode 1, UFOs, 2006, appears as self

Mower also appeared in the lead role of Detective Constable 'Birdie' Partridge in Chris Boucher (writer)'s 1981 mystery radio serial A Walk in the Dark.

== Stage work ==
Mower’s early career included extensive work in the theatre, encompassing both classical and contemporary productions. His stage appearances included roles in plays such as St. Joan at the Old Vic, Twelfth Night at the Royal Court Theatre, and John Gabriel Borkman and Caesar and Cleopatra in West End productions, demonstrating a grounding in classical repertory. In later years, he continued to appear on stage in regional theatre, including a 1999 production of Carl at the Chester Gateway Theatre. These theatre engagements ran alongside his better-known work in television and film.

Year	Production	Role	Venue / Company	Ref
c.1960s	St. Joan	Role unspecified	Old Vic, London	
c.1960s	Twelfth Night	Role unspecified	Royal Court Theatre, London	
c.1960s	John Gabriel Borkman	Role unspecified	West End	
c.1960s	Caesar and Cleopatra	Role unspecified	West End	
1999	Carl	Bing-Bong	Chester Gateway Theatre	
