= Monella (film) =

1998 film by Tinto Brass

- Theatrical release poster
- Directed by: Tinto Brass
- Written by: Tinto Brass; Carla Cipriani; Barbara Alberti
- Story by: Tinto Brass; Carla Cipriani
- Produced by: Giovanni Bertolucci
- Starring: Anna Ammirati; Patrick Mower; Max Parodi
- Cinematography: Massimo Di Venanzo
- Edited by: Tinto Brass
- Music by: Pino Donaggio
- Release date: 26 June 1998
- Running time: 105 minutes
- Country: Italy
- Language: Italian
- Budget: $2,400,000

Monella (titled Frivolous Lola in English-speaking markets) is a 1998 Italian comedy-erotic film directed by Tinto Brass.

== Plot ==
In the 1960s, in the Veneto region, two young people named Lola and Tommaso come from completely different worlds. Tommaso is the son of a wealthy family that owns a small bakery, which he is trying to expand into a larger factory to take advantage of the economic boom. His family, especially his mother, is very strict about social appearances and values. On the other hand, Lola is a bold and free-spirited girl whose mother, Zaira, used to work as a stewardess on the passenger ship Normandie and now lives with André, the former chef of the same ship. Their relationship is complicated, and it is possible that Lola is André’s daughter.

Because of Lola’s character and past, Tommaso has decided to abstain from sexual relations with her until marriage, while satisfying his desires with other women, including prostitutes. However, Lola cannot bear the wait and tries to attract his attention through provocative behavior and daring walks. The film mainly focuses on Lola’s attempts to seduce Tommaso.

Lola’s first attempt to get close to Tommaso in the bakery’s storage room is interrupted by the sudden arrival of Tommaso’s apprentice. A second attempt also fails during a walk by the riverbank.

Later, in a café, a serious argument breaks out between them. Lola draws attention by dancing to the song “Let’s Twist Again” with three unknown soldiers, but Tommaso interrupts the dance and gets into a fight with them. After this incident, their paths diverge: Lola gets into a car with a stranger who tries to seduce her, but she manages to escape; meanwhile, Tommaso takes his anger out on a prostitute, insulting Lola in the process.

Lola then tries to attract André, who is interested in her, but her mother’s intervention stops this from succeeding.

Finally, Lola schemes and pretends she has been assaulted by the stranger in the car. Instead of feeling sympathy, Tommaso becomes angry that someone else has been with his fiancée before him. He then abandons his previous intentions and finally has sex with Lola for the first time, although he still directs his usual insults at her. This marks the beginning of their married life.

In the end, they get married and invite all their friends to the wedding feast. There is a rumor that Lola also has a relationship with André during the celebration, without Tommaso knowing about it.

== Cast ==
- Anna Ammirati as Lola
- Patrick Mower as André
- Max Parodi as Masetto
- Susanna Martinková as Michelle
- Antonio Salines as Pepè
- Francesca Nunzi as Wilma
- Vittorio Attene as Ginetto
- Laura Trotter as Carmelina
- Carlo Reali as Toni
- Maurizio Prudenzi as Remo
- Edith Rozanyai as Carla
- Alberto Capone as Gildo
- Serena Grandi as Zaira
- Tinto Brass as Orchestra Conductor (uncredited)

== Production ==
Filming took place in Pomponesco, in the province of Mantua, in July 1997. The town's deputy mayor, Francesco Coppi, told l'Unità that he had lent the production his pink bicycle for several scenes. The newspaper reported that the bicycle had apparently been taken to Rome for further filming with Anna Ammirati. Brass said he first met Ammirati when he was driving and she was riding a bicycle.

In 2002, La Stampa reported that a black bicycle from the 1950s used in the film had been given to actress and Cinecittà marketing director Carole André by longtime studio guard Nando Cacciamani. André kept it in her office at the studios.

== Release ==
Monella was released in Italy on 29 January 1998. Before the release, Senator Michele Bonatesta called for the removal of an advertising poster showing Ammirati on a bicycle with two clergymen behind her.

The Italian censorship board initially restricted the film to viewers aged 18 and over. On appeal the minimum age was lowered to 14 after cuts, including a reduction of a scene involving clergymen and a bicycle saddle.
