= Pietro Taricone =

Italian actor and television personality (1975–2010)

- Born: 4 February 1975; Frosinone, Italy
- Died: 29 June 2010 (aged 35); Terni, Italy
- Occupations: Actor; television personality
- Years active: 2000—2010
- Known for: Grande Fratello

Pietro Taricone (4 February 1975 – 29 June 2010) was an Italian actor, television personality, and reality show contestant on Grande Fratello. An avid athlete and extreme sport enthusiast, he was nicknamed "O’ guerriero" ('The Warrior').

Taricone was born in Frosinone. He was a contestant on the first season of Grande Fratello, the Italian version of Big Brother, in 2000. On the show, Taricone had an affair with fellow contestant Cristina Plevani after just three days in the house. Taricone came in third place on the show, while Plevani won the season. However, the show launched Taricone's career and he later appeared in Italian television and film roles.

Taricone had one daughter, Sofia, with Kasia Smutniak, a Polish model and actress.

Taricone and Smutniak took part in a skydive over Terni, Umbria, in June 2010. During the jump, Taricone waited to open his parachute until he was just 100 metres (330 ft) from the ground and thus could not stop his fall in time before he hit the ground. He suffered severe back, leg, and head injuries in the accident.

He died on 29 June 2010, after more than nine hours of surgery, at the age of 35.
