= Georgi Dimitrov (gymnast) =

Bulgarian gymnast

- Георги Димитров
- Born: 27 January 1911

Gymnastics career
- Discipline: Men's artistic gymnastics
- Country represented: Bulgaria

Georgi Dimitrov (Bulgarian: Георги Димитров) (born 27 January 1911, date of death unknown) was a Bulgarian gymnast. He competed in eight events at the 1936 Summer Olympics.
