= Provaci ancora prof! =

Italian TV series (2005-2017)

- Genre: Teen comedy
- Created by: Margherita Oggero
- Starring: Veronica Pivetti; Enzo Decaro; Paolo Conticini; Pino Ammendola; Ludovica Gargari; Cesare Bocci; Flavio Montrucchio
- Composers: Kristian Sensini and Pino Donaggio
- Country of origin: Italy
- No. of seasons: 7
- No. of episodes: 46

Production
- Running time: 100 minutes
- Production companies: Endemol Italia, Rai Fiction

Original release
- Network: Rai 1
- Release: November 6, 2005 – October 19, 2017

Provaci ancora prof! (English: Try again teacher!) is an Italian television series.

== Plot ==
The show follows the story of Camilla Baudino, a high school teacher that often finds herself involved in some crimes. Camilla, an amateur detective, collaborates with policemen to resolve these cases and in the meantime she takes care of her husband and daughter.

== Main characters ==
- Camilla Baudino (seasons 1–7), starring Veronica Pivetti.
  Inquisitive and stubborn literature teacher in the technical school Fibonacci in Rome first (seasons 1–4), in the Nelson Mandela Institute in Turin then (seasons 5–6) and in a night class for adults also in Turin finally (season 7). She is Renzo's wife and Livietta's mother. She collaborates with the commissioner Gaetano Berardi, whom she is strongly attracted to, every time a crime somehow concerning her occurs; after the arrival of the commissioner Paolo Matteis, she continues to collaborate with the police secretly, thanks to Torre and Marchese. During season 4, she separates from Renzo and starts a relationship with Mario Visconti, but in the end she gets back together with her husband. During season 5, she moves to Turin, where she finds again the commissioner Berardi and the inspector Torre. During season 6, she breaks up with Renzo a second time, after finding out he cheated on her with Carmen and got his lover pregnant; she then gets engaged with the commissioner Berardi. During the last episodes of season 7, she moves to Naples, where Gaetano has been relocated.
- Renzo Ferrero (seasons 1–7), starring Enzo Decaro.
  Good hearted and sarcastic architect, he is Camilla's husband and Livietta's father. He is not happy at all with Camilla collaborating with the police in relation to murders, as he mainly fears that his wife could get into troubles or risky situations. He is also suspicious of Gaetano, whom he often considers Camilla's lover. During season 2, he is strongly attracted to Pamela, his daughter's dance teacher, a feeling which ends with the woman flying to New York. During season 4, he separates from Camilla and starts a relationship with his young colleague Carmen; however, when Carmen tells him they must move to America to keep working together, he understands how much he loves his family and eventually comes back to his wife. During season 6, he has a one-night stand with Carmen in Venice and gets her pregnant with Lorenzo, also called Renzito. After he breaks up with Camilla, he longs for coming back to his wife again, despite the latter has got engaged with Gaetano.
- Gaetano Berardi (seasons 1–3, 5–7), starring Paolo Conticini.
  Charming and kind police commissioner, he manages the investigations Camilla gets involved in. He has a relationship with the gallerist Bettina during season 1, with the prosecutor Sonia De Giorgis during season 2 and with Roberta, whom he nearly marries with, during season 3. He and Camilla are clearly attracted to each other, but he tries to forget the teacher in the end of season 3. During season 4, he never appears as he is said to have got married and become quaestor in Sondrio. During season 5, he comes back in Camilla's life and, during season 6, he succeeds in engaging with her, taking advantage of her marital crisis. Since then, he is very jealous of Renzo, acknowledging the latter is still in love with Camilla, and annoyed of the chaotic family life the teacher lives. In the last episode of season 7, he gets another displacement and starts living with Camilla in Naples.
- Pasquale Torre (seasons 1–7), starring Pino Ammendola.
  Nice neapolitan detective, he is Berardi's and De Matteis' friend, as well as Camilla's informant. During season 5, he moves to Turin following Berardi's displacement. Although he does not like Turin's weather and lifestyle, he finally settles in and engages with his colleague Luciana, who becomes his wife during season 6 and whom he is preatty jealous of.
- Livia "Livietta" Ferrero (seasons 1–7), starring Ludovica Gargari.
  Intelligent and clever Renzo and Camilla's daughter, she has a very good relationship with her parents. She is friend with Giulio, son of her mother's colleague Martina Predolin, and Nino, Berardi's nephew. During season 4, when she is 13, she has a crush on her dance mate Diego. During season 5, she lives some teenage issues with her parents, especially due to their move to Turin; in spite of that, she finds love, first in a boy charged with murder and later in a shy classmate. During season 6, she falls in love with George, a boy from London met during a study holiday, who becomes her husband and father of her daughter, named Camilla (nicknamed Cami) after the teacher. During season 7, she find out that George cheated on her, so she comes back to Turin with Cami and starts attending the faculty of architecture; she then starts a short relationship with Stefano Busi, one of her father's clients, who then turns out to be a womanizer; she finally gets back to George in London and decides to continue her studies in England.
- Marco De Matteis/Visconti (season 4), starring Cesare Bocci.
  Handsome and charming wine estate entrepreneur, he is the commissioner Paolo de Matteis' brother. His surname used to be "De Matteis", but he later adopted his mother's surname "Visconti". He starts a relationship with Camilla, whom he proposes to, but in the end the teacher breaks up with him to get back to her husband.
- Paolo De Matteis (season 4), starring Flavio Montrucchio.
  Painstaking and obsessive commissioner, he is Marco Visconti's brother. He dislikes Camilla, whose interference in police investigations he does not tolerate. He lives in his brother's house, despite Marco advises him to find his own home.
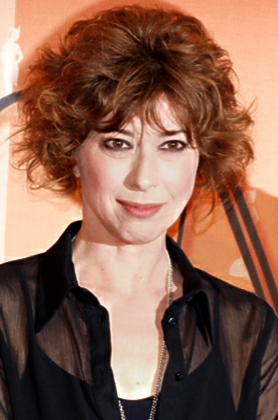
Veronica Pivetti is Camilla Baudino

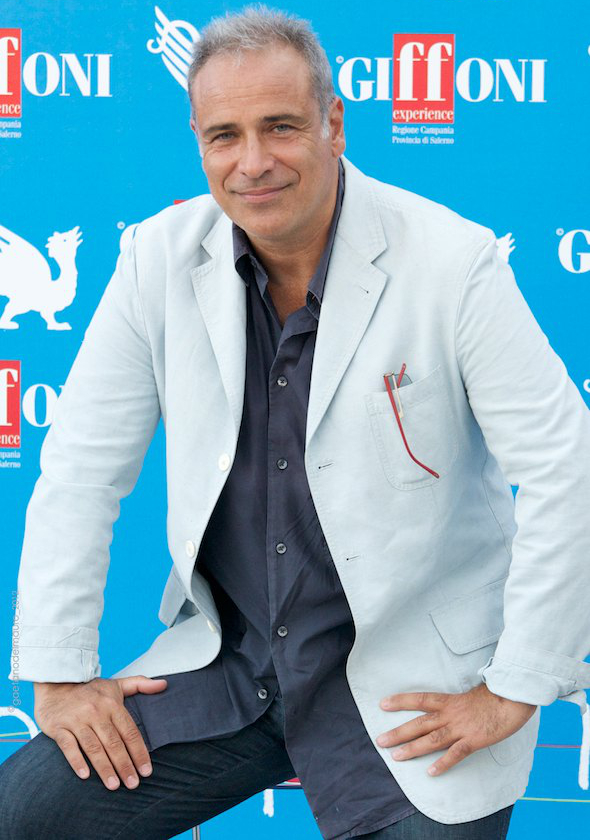
Enzo Decaro is Renzo Ferrero

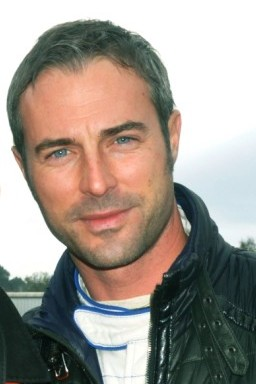
Flavio Montrucchio is Paolo De Matteis

== Locations ==
Seasons 1-4 are set in Rome mainly. Seasons 5-7 are set both in Rome and Turin.

== Social themes ==
- Divorce
- Drug addiction
- Illegal immigration
- Compulsive gambling
- 'Ndrangheta
- Murder
- Prostitution
- Kidnapping
- Ultras
- Usury
- Violence against women

== Episodes ==
| Season | Episodes | Originally released | |
| Season | Episodes | First released | Last released |
|---|---|---|---|
| 1 | 4 | November 6, 2005 | November 14, 2005 |
| 2 | 6 | April 15, 2007 | May 7, 2007 |
| 3 | 8 | September 18, 2008 | November 6, 2008 |
| 4 | 6 | February 19, 2012 | March 13, 2012 |
| 5 | 6 | September 12, 2013 | October 17, 2013 |
| 6 | 8 | September 10, 2015 | October 18, 2015 |
| 7 | 8 | September 14, 2017 | October 19, 2017 |

=== Season 1 (2005) ===
| No. | Title (Italian) | Title (English) | Directed by | Original release date |
|---|---|---|---|---|
| 1 | "Il regalo di Babbo Natale" | Santa Claus's Gift | Rossella Izzo | November 6, 2005 |
| 2 | "Un amore pericoloso" | A Dangerous Love | Rossella Izzo | November 7, 2005 |
| 3 | "Una piccola bestia ferita" | A Small Wounded Beast | Rossella Izzo | November 13, 2005 |
| 4 | "La mia compagna di banco" | My Classmate | Rossella Izzo | November 14, 2005 |

=== Season 2 (2007) ===
| No. in season | Title (Italian) | Title (English) | Directed by | Original release date |
|---|---|---|---|---|
| 1 | "La finestra sulla scuola" | The Window on the School | Rossella Izzo | April 15, 2007 |
| 2 | "Una mina vagante" | A Loose Cannon | Rossella Izzo | April 16, 2007 |
| 3 | "Dietro la porta" | Behind the Door | Rossella Izzo | April 22, 2007 |
| 4 | "L'amica americana" | The American friend | Rossella Izzo | April 29, 2007 |
| 5 | "Vita da cani" | A Dog's Life | Rossella Izzo | May 6, 2007 |
| 6 | "La strana ossessione" | The Strange Obsession | Rossella Izzo | May 7, 2007 |

=== Season 3 (2008) ===
| No. in season | Title (Italian) | Title (English) | Directed by | Original release date |
|---|---|---|---|---|
| 1 | "Due americane a Roma" | Two Americans in Rome | Rossella Izzo | September 18, 2008 |
| 2 | "Doppio imprevisto" | Unexpected Double | Rossella Izzo | September 25, 2008 |
| 3 | "La terza vittima" | The Third Victim | Rossella Izzo | October 2, 2008 |
| 4 | "Black light" | Black Light | Rossella Izzo | October 9, 2008 |
| 5 | "La signora dei cuoricini" | The Lady of the Little Hearts | Rossella Izzo | October 16, 2008 |
| 6 | "Una sera troppo fredda" | A Night Much Too Cold | Rossella Izzo | October 23, 2008 |
| 7 | "Per un pugno di mosche" | For A Fistful of Flies | Rossella Izzo | October 30, 2008 |
| 8 | "La prof della prof" | The Teacher of the Teacher | Rossella Izzo | November 6, 2008 |

=== Season 4 (2012) ===
| No. in season | Title (Italian) | Title (English) | Directed by | Original release date |
|---|---|---|---|---|
| 1 | "Un amore sbagliato" | A Wrong Love | Tiziana Aristarco | February 19, 2012 |
| 2 | "Doppio bersaglio" | Double Target | Tiziana Aristarco | February 20, 2012 |
| 3 | "La versione di Carmen" | Carmen's Version | Tiziana Aristarco | February 28, 2012 |
| 4 | "Il sogno del faraone" | The Pharaoh's Dream | Tiziana Aristarco | March 6, 2012 |
| 5 | "Cattivi maestri" | Bad Teachers | Tiziana Aristarco | March 12, 2012 |
| 6 | "Vincoli del cuore" | Constraints of the Heart | Tiziana Aristarco | March 13, 2012 |

=== Season 5 (2013) ===
| No. in season | Title (Italian) | Title (English) | Directed by | Original release date |
|---|---|---|---|---|
| 1 | "Il gioco del destino" | The Game of the Destiny | Tiziana Aristarco | September 12, 2013 |
| 2 | "Doppio inganno" | Double Deception | Tiziana Aristarco | September 19, 2013 |
| 3 | "Vite segrete" | Secret Lives | Tiziana Aristarco | September 26, 2013 |
| 4 | "L'ultima telefonata" | The Last Call | Tiziana Aristarco | October 3, 2013 |
| 5 | "La scatola dei ricordi" | The Box of Memories | Tiziana Aristarco | October 10, 2013 |
| 6 | "Le mani in tasca" | The Hands in the Pocket | Tiziana Aristarco | October 17, 2013 |

=== Season 6 (2015) ===
The series was renewed for a sixth season of 8 episodes and aired in 2015.

| No. in season | Title (Italian) | Title (English) | Directed by | Original release date |
|---|---|---|---|---|
| 1 | "Passioni sprecate" | TBA | Enrico Oldoini | September 10, 2015 |
| 2 | "Debiti pericolosi" | TBA | Enrico Oldoini | September 17, 2015 |
| 3 | "In trappola" | TBA | Enrico Oldoini | September 24, 2015 |
| 4 | "Le ali spezzate" | TBA | Enrico Oldoini | September 29, 2015 |
| 5 | "Il giro giusto" | TBA | Enrico Oldoini | October 1, 2015 |
| 6 | "L'ultima litigata" | TBA | Enrico Oldoini | October 4, 2015 |
| 7 | "Fuori servizio" | TBA | Enrico Oldoini | October 11, 2015 |
| 8 | "Primo amore" | TBA | Enrico Oldoini | October 18, 2015 |

=== Season 7 (2017) ===
The series was renewed for a seventh season of 8 episodes and will air in 2017.

| No. in season | Title (Italian) | Title (English) | Directed by | Original release date |
|---|---|---|---|---|
| 1 | "Cioccolato amaro" | TBA | Lodovico Gasparini | September 14, 2017 |
| 2 | "A luci spente" | TBA | Lodovico Gasparini | September 18, 2017 |
| 3 | "Sangue nel cortile" | TBA | Lodovico Gasparini | September 21, 2017 |
| 4 | "Ragioni superiori" | TBA | Lodovico Gasparini | September 28, 2017 |
| 5 | "Attenti al mago" | TBA | Lodovico Gasparini | October 5, 2017 |
| 6 | "Una scelta difficile" | TBA | Lodovico Gasparini | October 12, 2017 |
| 7 | "Errori a catena" | TBA | Lodovico Gasparini | October 18, 2017 |
| 8 | "La resa dei conti" | TBA | Lodovico Gasparini | October 19, 2017 |

== See also ==
- List of Italian television series
