= Stefano Lentini =

Italian composer (born 1974)

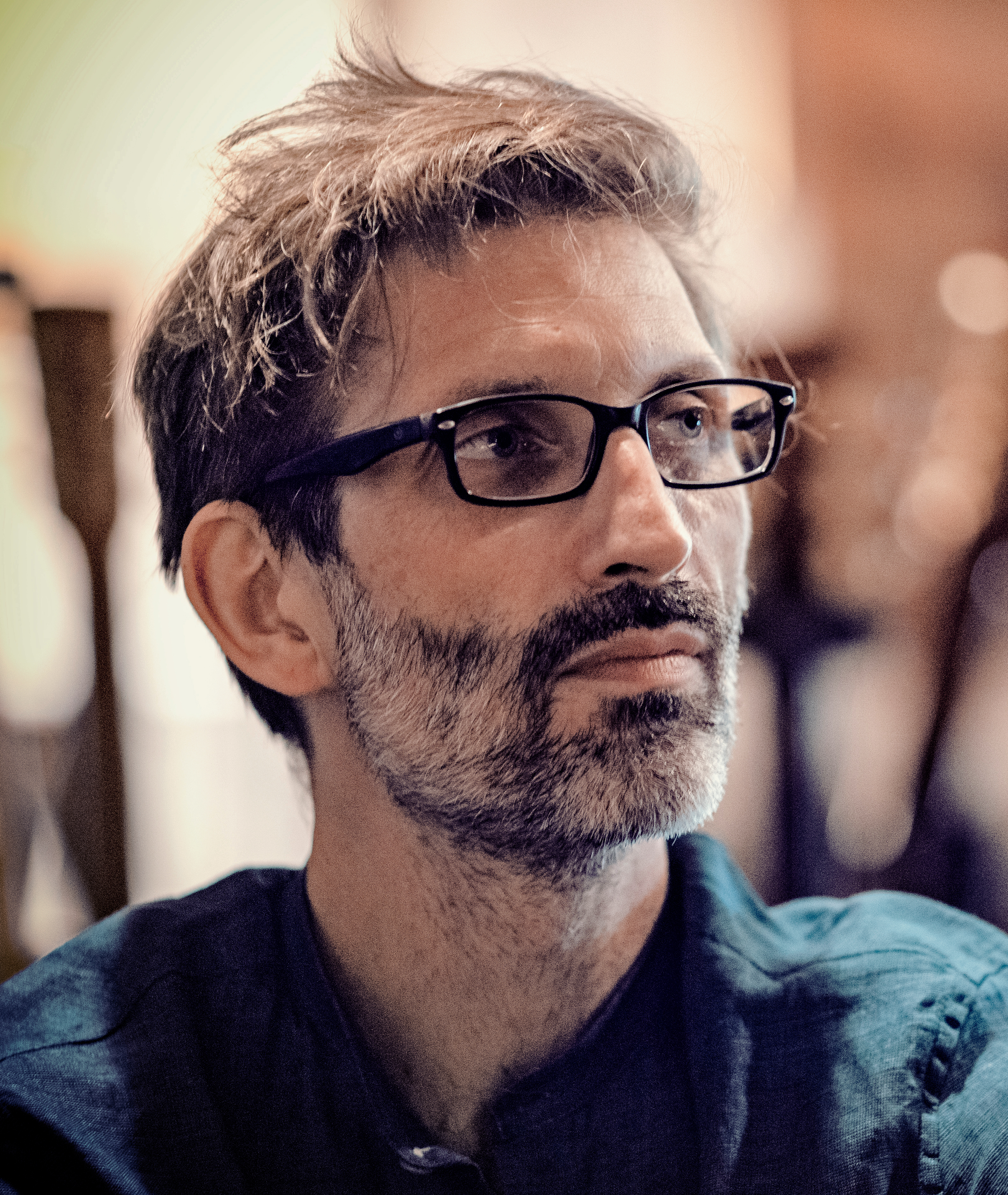
- Lentini in 2024

Background information
- Born: 26 November 1974 (age 51)
- Origin: Rome, Italy
- Genres: Film score, alt classic, indie classic
- Occupations: Composer, musician, songwriter
- Instruments: Guitar, bass guitar, flute, pipa, piano, drums, recorder
- Years active: 1999–present
- Labels: Rai Com; C.A.M. Milan Records; Coloora Records
- Website: www.stefanolentini.net

Stefano Lentini (born 26 November 1974) is an Italian composer based in Rome. He has extensively composed and produced music for film, television, and theatre, working across a wide range of genres.

His musical journey began with a classical guitar crafted by his grandfather, a carpenter, using wood from old wardrobe doors. Lentini started composing and recording music at an early age. A multi-instrumentalist, he is recognized for his distinctive guitar melodies but also plays piano, bass, drums, flute, lute, and various other instruments. Through multitrack recording, he often performs all instrumental parts on his albums. His compositions frequently incorporate rich string orchestrations, resulting in a symphonic and cinematic sound.

Lentini's television work has been screened in Italy and around the world and includes the TV series Belcanto, The Sea Beyond (seasons 1–6), The Red Door (seasons 1–3), Braccialetti Rossi (seasons 1–3) (International Emmy Kids Awards nominee), El Maestro, Bakhita, and Drawn for Jury Duty. He composed the soundtrack for the feature films Maresia (Premiered at the 2015 Festival des Films du Monde, Montreal), The Nest of the Turtledove (Best Ukrainian Film, Odesa 2016), and Grazing The Wall (Selected at the 69th Venice International Film Festival). He collaborated with Wong Kar-Wai on the soundtrack for The Grandmaster, a film nominated for two Academy Awards, and contributed to the soundtrack of the short film Self 05, produced by Antony Vaccarello for Yves Saint Laurent. His album Stabat Mater was among the iTunes Top 10 Original Score Albums in Belgium, Italy, France, Hong Kong, Singapore, and Taiwan. It also reached No.1 in Hong Kong. His soundtrack for The Sea Beyond was awarded two gold records and a double platinum certification. Streaming numbers have exceeded 100 million plays on Spotify and YouTube. Additionally, as a producer and composer, he received three SIAE Awards in 2023 and 2024.

Lentini makes use of a variety of instruments, often playing many of them himself on the same track and writes music in various time signatures. He is considered part of the cross-chamber music genre, but his influences are very broad. Lentini's music often has spiritual themes, and many of his songs draw inspiration from real stories.

== Biography ==
Lentini's first instrument was the guitar, built by his grandfather using wood from the doors of an antique wardrobe. Ever since he was young, he has dedicated himself to the composition and arrangement of music. He made his debut at the Folkstudio, a historic nightclub in Rome. He graduated with high honors in Cultural Anthropology and studied Ethnomusicology in Rome and London.

A multi-instrumentalist, Stefano Lentini is known for his use of unconventional tunes on the guitar, but he also plays electric bass, piano, drums, and several other instruments, often playing all of these on his albums through the use of multitrack recording. While in school, he studied the lute and flute, which he also plays on his albums. This multitude of instruments, including string orchestrations, figures prominently in his compositions, giving his music a symphonic sound.

== Selected filmography ==
Year	Title	Director	Studio	Notes
2026	The Sea Beyond Se06	Beniamino Catena	Picomedia; Rai Fiction	
2026	Free Women	Michele Soavi	Endemol Shine Italy; Rai Fiction	
2026	Morbo K	Francesco Patierno	Fabula Pictures; Rai Fiction	
2025	The Sea Beyond SE05	Ludovico Di Martino	Picomedia; Rai Fiction	
2025	‘’Belcanto	Carmine Elia	Rai Fiction; Lucky Red	
2024	The Sea Beyond SE04	Ivan Silvestrini	Picomedia; Rai Fiction	
2024	‘’Studio Battaglia Se02	Simone Spada	Rai Fiction; Palomar	
2023	‘’Survivors’’	Carmine Elia	Rodeo; Rai Fiction	
2023	‘’Mare Fuori Se03	Ivan Silvestrini	Picomedia; Rai Fiction	
2023	‘’S’’tudio Battaglia	Simone Spada	Palomar; Rai Fiction	
2021	Mare Fuori Se02	Milena Cocozza, Ivan Silvestrini	Picomedia; Rai Fiction	
2020	Mare Fuori	Carmine Elia	Picomedia; Rai Fiction	
2020	The Devil's Clock	Alessandro Angelini	Rai Fiction; Picomedia	
2019	La porta rossa Se02	Carmine Elia	Vela Film; Rai Fiction; Garbo Film	
2019	De Sable et de Feu	Souheil Ben-Barka	Jal's Production; Flat Parioli	
2019	Liberi di scegliere	Giacomo Campiotti	Bibi Film; Rai Fiction	
2018	Taranta on the Road	Salvatore Allocca	Marvin Film; Vega's Project	
2018	Tainted Love	Marta Carocci Vovcs	Premier Film	
2017	La porta rossa Se01	Carmine Elia	Vela Film; Rai Fiction	
2017	The Ballerina	Steven Pullen	Old Dominion	
2016	Braccialetti Rossi Se03	Giacomo Campiotti	Palomar; Rai Fiction	
2016	Maresia	Marcos Guttmann	Solar Movies; Bird Film	
2016	Jehanne	Marion Cavaillé	Esav	
2015	Tango per la Libertà	Alberto Negrin	Compagnia Leone Cinematografica; Rai Fiction; Rai 1	
2015	Braccialetti Rossi Se02	Giacomo Campiotti	Palomar; Rai Fiction	
2014	Sarà un Paese	Nicola Campiotti	Indrapur Cinematografica	
2014	Non è mai troppo tardi	Giacomo Campiotti	Bibi Film; Rai Fiction	
2014	Braccialetti Rossi Se01	Giacomo Campiotti	Palomar; Rai Fiction	
2013	The Grandmaster	Wong Kar-wai	Block 2 Pictures; Jet Tone Films; Sil-Metropole Organisation; Bona International Film Group	Composed with Shigeru Umebayashi and Nathaniel Méchaly
2013	Ausgepresst Wie Zitronen	Andreas Pichler	Miramonte Film; Arte	
2013	Country of Bodies: Bombay in Dance	Puneet Rakheja	Little Red Car	
2012	Ailes de Mercure	Olivier Beaudoin	Beauodin Production	
2012	Waves	Pilli Cortese	Woho	
2012	Sfiorando il muro	Silvia Giralucci	Doclab	
2011	Silvio, one of us	Andreas Pichler	Miramonte Film; ORF	
2010	Skin deep	Franco Di Chiera	ABC; Doclab; Electric Pictures Pty Ltd	
2010	Il Sorteggio	Giacomo Campiotti	Artis; Rai Fiction	
2010	La Nuova Armata Brancaleone	Mario Monicelli	Carlo Rossellini	
2009	399 B.C.	Nicola Campiotti	Prana Film	
2009	Bakhita	Giacomo Campiotti	Titania Produzioni; Rai Fiction	
2008	Torpedos im Morgengrauen - Das letzte Schlachtschiff des Kaiser	Maria-Magdalena Koller	Interspot Film; ORF; Vidicom; ARTE; ZDF; BMUKK; DocLab; MTV; SF	
2006	Shooting Silvio	Berardo Carboni	Mork&Berry; Kubla Khan; Cinedance	
2005	Excellent Cadavers	Marco Turco	Doclab; Rai 3 Artline Films; France 2 BBC Storyville; Yle Teema; Svt; SBS TV Australia	Composed with Andrea Pandolfo
2005	La Via del successo	Leonardo D'Agostini	Dorje Film	
2005	Smart	Leonardo D'Agostini	Studio Universal	

== Discography ==
- Anima Mundi, Concept Album Stefano Lentini & Leléka (Coloora, 2026)
- Morbo K", Original Soundtrack from the TV Series Rai Com - Second Round (2026)
- Free Women", Original Soundtrack from the TV Series Rai Com (2026)
- The Sea Beyond 6", Original Soundtrack from the TV Series Rai Com (2026)
- Belcanto, Original Soundtrack from the TV Series Coloora (2025)
- The Sea Beyond 5, Original Soundtrack from the TV Series Rai Com (2025)
- Studio Battaglia 2, Colonna sonora originale della Serie Tv Curci (2024)
- The Sea Beyond 4, Original Soundtrack from the TV Series Rai Com (2024)
- The Sea Beyond 3, Original Soundtrack from the TV Series Rai Com (2023)
- The Red Door Season 03, Original Soundtrack from the TV Series Rai Com (2023)
- Survivors", Original Soundtrack from the TV Series Rai Com (2022)
- Studio Battaglia, Colonna sonora originale della Serie Tv Curci (2022)
- Mare Fuori Seconda Stagione, Colonna sonora originale della Serie Tv Rai Com (2022)
- Venere Coloora (2020)
- Mare Fuori, Colonna sonora originale della Serie Tv Rai Com (2020)
- The Devil's Clock, Colonna sonora originale della Serie Tv Cinevox (2020)
- La Porta Rossa Season 02, Colonna sonora originale della Serie Tv Rai Com (2019)
- Fury Coloora Records (2018)
- La porta rossa, Colonna sonora originale della Serie Tv Rai Com (2017)
- Stabat Mater - As Seen in Wong Kar Wai's "The Grandmaster" Milan Records, Warner Classics (2013)
- Watanka Original Music from the Television Series Braccialetti rossi, Edizioni Curci (2014)
- Non è mai troppo tardi Original Motion Picture Soundtrack, RAI (2014)
- Bakhita Original Motion Picture Soundtrack, RAI (2011)
- Cinematic Soundscape Soundtrack, RAI (2011)
- Tango & Popular Vibes Soundtrack, RAI (2011)
- Il sorteggio Original Soundtrack Motion Picture', RAI (2010)
- Una piccola piccola storia, Le Disco de Rondone (2009)
- Shooting Silvio Original Soundtrack, C.A.M. Original Soundtracks (2007)
- Soundtrack Sampler, Various Artists, C.A.M. Original Soundtracks (2007)
- Soundtrack Sampler, Various Artists, C.A.M. Original Soundtracks (2006)
- Super Naim Experience', Self produced (1999)

Collaborations:

- Primo, Clara, Warner Music Group (2024)
- Human, Stefano Lentini and Tom Baxter, Coloora (2023)
- As I Am, Charlie Winston, tôt Ou tard (2023)
- Braccialetti Rossi, Carosello (2014)
- In un altro Paese OST, C.A.M. Original Soundtracks (2005)

== Curiosity ==
His album Stabat Mater - As Seen in Wong Kar Wai's "The Grandmaster" is iTunes Top 10 Original Score Albums in Belgium, Italy, France, Hong Kong, Taiwan. Lentini collaborates with English songwriter Charlie Winston for the Main Title of the TV Series The Red Door. The song, titled "It's Not Impossible" was n#2 in the iTunes Soundtrack Chart in Italy. In 2026, he released Anima Mundi, a concept album created with Ukrainian artist Leléka and recorded with a symphony orchestra and choir of more than 80 performers. The project brings together classical and folk-pop elements, exploring the legacy passed from adults to children and the responsibility that comes with it. The track First Steps was featured in the cult Italian series The Sea Beyond se6, whose first four seasons are currently distributed globally by Netflix in 190 countries.
