= Georgi Dimitrov Dimitrov =

Bulgarian sociologist (born 1958)

Georgi D. Dimitrov (Bulgarian: Георги Д. Димитров; born April 13, 1958) is a Bulgarian sociologist and professor at the European Studies department of Sofia University. Doctor Habilis in Sociology (2000). He works in the field of historical sociology. Major works on: history and sociology of sociology, education reform, modernity, European civilisation, Bulgarian society.
