= Anna Ammirati =

Italian actress (born 1979)

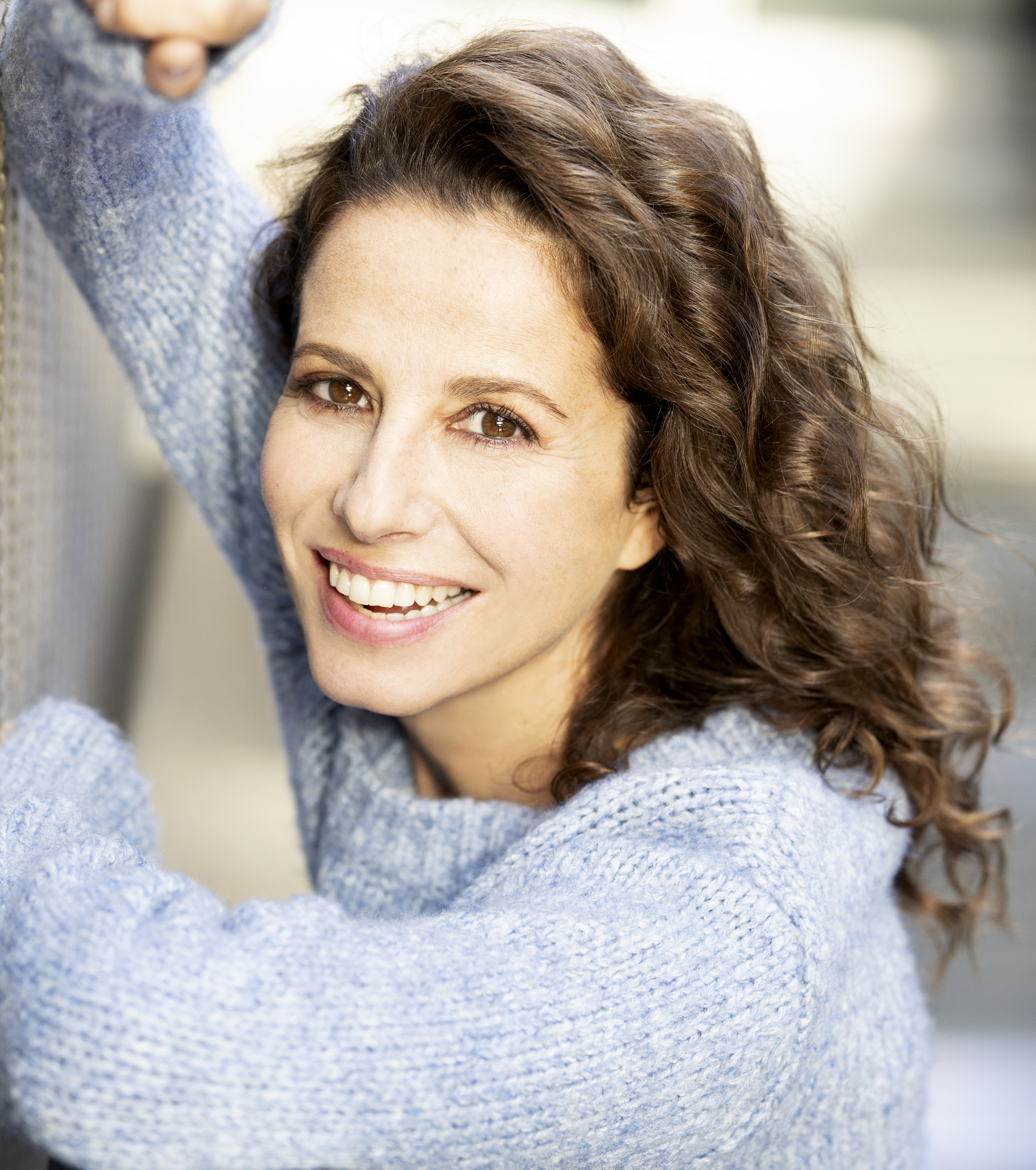
- Ammirati in 2024
- Born: January 1, 1979 (age 47); Naples, Italy
- Occupation: Actress
- Years active: 1996–present

Anna Ammirati (born January 1, 1979) is an Italian actress.

== Career ==
After finishing a liceo artistico in Campania, Ammirati moved to Rome to study psychology. During her studies she was cast in minor acting roles, starting with the miniseries Positano.

In 1997, she applied at a casting session at Cinecittà organised by director Tinto Brass to find the lead actress for Monella. Her greatest success came with this early role, but like many other Brass finds, her later career was of much lower profile.

Ammirati now lives in London but she has been active on the Italian acting scene with cinematic films as well as TV series such as Io e mio figlio - Nuove storie per il commissario Vivaldi.
