= Campania 1 (Chamber of Deputies constituency) =

- Chamber of Deputies; Electoral constituency
- Region: Campania
- Electorate: 2,379,167 (2022) 2,401,003 (2018)
- Major settlements: Naples

Current constituency
- Created: 1993
- Seats: 18
- Members: M5S (11); FI (1); PD (2); AIV (1); FdI (2); AVS (1)

Campania 1 is one of the 29 constituencies (Italian: circoscrizioni) represented in the Chamber of Deputies, the lower house of the Italian parliament. The constituency currently elects 18 deputies. Its boundaries correspond to those of the Metropolitan City of Naples, within the Campania region. The electoral system uses a parallel voting system, which act as a mixed system, with 3/8 of seats allocated using a first-past-the-post electoral system and 5/8 using a proportional method, with one round of voting.

The constituency was first established by the Mattarella law on 4 August 1993 and later confirmed by the Calderoli law on 21 December 2005 and by the Rosato law on 3 November 2017. The current borders of the districts were created as a result of the 2020 Italian Constitutional Referendum.

== Members of the Parliament ==
=== Legislature XIX (2022-Present) ===
Single-member districts
District			Deputy	Coalition	Party	Ref
N.	Name	Map	Deputy	Coalition	Party	Ref
01	Giugliano in Campania		Antonio Caso		Five Star Movement	
02	Napoli: Quartiere 19 - Fuorigrotta		Sergio Costa		Five Star Movement	
03	Napoli: Quartiere 7 - San Carlo All'Arena		Dario Carotenuto		Five Star Movement	
04	Casoria		Pasqualino Penza		Five Star Movement	
05	Acerra		Carmela Auriemma		Five Star Movement	
06	Somma Vesuviana		Carmen Di Lauro		Five Star Movement	
07	Torre del Greco		Gaetano Amato		Five Star Movement	

Multi-member districts
District			Deputy	Coalition	Party	Ref
N.	Name	Map	Deputy	Coalition	Party	Ref
01	Campania 1 - P01		Raffaele Bruno	Five Star Movement		
01	Campania 1 - P01		Marianna Ricciardi	Five Star Movement		
01	Campania 1 - P01		Michele Schiano di Visconti	Centre-right	Brothers of Italy	
01	Campania 1 - P01		Roberto Speranza	Centre-left	Democratic Party	
01	Campania 1 - P01		Gilda Sportiello	Five Star Movement		
02	Campania 1 - P02		Francesco Emilio Borrelli	Centre-left	Greens and Left Alliance	
02	Campania 1 - P02		Alessandro Caramiello	Five Star Movement		
02	Campania 1 - P02		Annarita Patriarca	Centre-right	Forza Italia	
02	Campania 1 - P02		Ettore Rosato	Action – Italia Viva		
02	Campania 1 - P02		Marco Sarracino	Centre-left	Democratic Party	
02	Campania 1 - P02		Marta Schifone	Centre-right	Brothers of Italy	

=== 2018–present ===
Single-member districts
District			Deputy	Party
N.	Name	Map	Deputy	Party
01	Giugliano in Campania		Salvatore Micillo	Five Star Movement
02	Nola		Silvana Nappi	Five Star Movement
03	Acerra		Luigi Di Maio	Five Star Movement
04	Casoria		Vincenzo Spadafora	Five Star Movement
05	Naples–San Carlo all'Arena		Doriana Sarli	Five Star Movement
06	Naples–Ponticelli		Rina De Lorenzo	Five Star Movement
07	Naples–San Lorenzo		Raffaele Bruno	Five Star Movement
08	Naples–Fuorigrotta		Roberto Fico	Five Star Movement
09	Pozzuoli		Andrea Caso	Five Star Movement
10	Portici		Gianfranco Di Sarno	Five Star Movement
11	Torre del Greco		Luigi Gallo	Five Star Movement
12	Castellammare di Stabia		Catello Vitiello	Five Star Movement

Multi-member districts
District			Party	Deputy
N.	Name	Map	Party	Deputy
01	Campania 1 – 01		Five Star Movement	Concetta Giordano
01	Campania 1 – 01		Five Star Movement	Iolanda Di Stasio
01	Campania 1 – 01		Forza Italia	Antonio Pentangelo
01	Campania 1 – 01		Forza Italia	Marta Fascina
01	Campania 1 – 01		Democratic Party	Gennaro Migliore
01	Campania 1 – 01		League	Giuseppina Castiello
01	Campania 1 – 01		Free and Equal	Michela Rostan
02	Campania 1 – 02		Five Star Movement	Gilda Sportiello
02	Campania 1 – 02		Five Star Movement	Alessandro Amitrano
02	Campania 1 – 02		Five Star Movement	Flora Frate
02	Campania 1 – 02		Forza Italia	Mara Carfagna
02	Campania 1 – 02		Democratic Party	Paolo Siani
03	Campania 1 – 03		Five Star Movement	Teresa Manzo
03	Campania 1 – 03		Five Star Movement	Luigi Iovino
03	Campania 1 – 03		Five Star Movement	Carmen Di Lauro
03	Campania 1 – 03		Forza Italia	Paolo Russo
03	Campania 1 – 03		Democratic Party	Raffaele Topo
