= Elena Bouryka =

Russian-Italian actress

Elena Bouryka (born 29 July 1983 in Moscow) is a Russian-born actress who currently lives and works in Italy.

She played Baby Pozzi in the Sky Cinema miniseries Moana.

== Filmography ==
=== Film ===
- The Torturer, directed by Lamberto Bava (2005)
- Passo a due, directed by Andrea Barzini (2005)
- Notte prima degli esami, directed by Fausto Brizzi (2006)
- Agente matrimoniale, directed by Christian Bisceglia (2006)
- Ma l'amore... si, directed by Marco Costa and Tonino Zangardi (2006)
- Family Game, directed by Alfredo Arciero (2007)
- L'abbuffata, directed by Mimmo Calopresti (2007)
- Tutte le donne della mia vita, directed by Simona Izzo (2007)
- Lillo e Greg - The movie!, directed by Luca Rea (2007)
- E guardo il mondo da un oblò, directed by Stefano Calvagna (2007)
- Tris di donne e abiti nuziali, directed by Vincenzo Terracciano (2008)
- Le cose in te nascoste, directed by Vito Vinci (2008)
- Penso che un sogno così, directed by Marco De Luca (2008)
- Cartoline da Roma (Postcards from Rome), directed by Giulio Base (2008)
- Piede di Dio, directed by Luigi Sardiello (2009)
- Barbarossa, directed by Renzo Martinelli (2009)
- La soluzione migliore, directed by Luca Mazzieri (2009)
- Blood Red Karma, directed by Antonio Nardone

=== TV ===
- La squadra 3, various directors - TV series (2002)
- Isolati (2003)
- Abasso il frollocone (2003/04)
- Stracult (2003/04/05/06/07)
- Bla bla bla (2005)
- Carabinieri 4, directed by Raffaele Mertes TV series (2005)
- Elisa di Rivombrosa, directed by Cinzia TH Torrini and Stefano Alleva - TV series (2005)
- L'ultimo rigore 2, directed by Sergio Martino - miniseries (2006)
- R.I.S. 2 - Delitti imperfetti - Episode: Testimone silenzioso, directed by Alexis Sweet - TV series (2006)
- Moana, directed by Alfredo Peyretti - miniseries (2009)
- Io e mio figlio - Nuove storie per il commissario Vivaldi, directed by Luciano Odorisio - miniseries (2010)

=== Short subjects ===
- Metti a fuoco alcune cose, directed by Fabrizio Finamore
- La voce del cuore, directed by Ugo Mangini
- Autostop, directed by Simone Bonacelli (2007)
- All Human Rights for All, directed by Giorgio Treves (2008)
