= Moana (miniseries) =

- Directed by: Alfredo Peyretti
- Starring: Violante Placido
- Music by: Pivio & Aldo De Scalzi
- Country of origin: Italy
- Original language: Italian

Original release
- Network: Sky Cinema
- Release: 1 December – 2 December 2009

Moana is a 2009 Italian biographical dramatic miniseries directed by Alfredo Peyretti.

The miniseries premiered at the 2009 Roma Fiction Fest, and was broadcast in two parts on 1 and 2 December of the same year on Sky Cinema. Moana recounts the life of iconic Italian pornographic actress Moana Pozzi. Actress Ilona Staller sued the production for unauthorized use of the character "Cicciolina", of which she owned the rights; the case was eventually dismissed by the court.

== Cast ==
- Violante Placido as Moana Pozzi
- Fausto Paravidino as Riccardo Schicchi
- Gaetano Amato as Pasquale
- Michele Venitucci as Antonio Di Ciesco
- Giorgia Würth as Cicciolina
- Antonella Salvucci as Ramba
- Elena Bouryka as Baby Pozzi
