= Gaetano Amato =

Italian actor, writer and politician

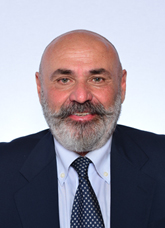

Deputy of the Italian Republic
- Incumbent
- Assumed office October 13, 2022

Personal details
- Born: July 5, 1957 (age 68) Castellammare di Stabia, Italy
- Party: Five Star Movement
- Education: Parthenope University of Naples
- Occupation: Politician, actor, writer

Gaetano Amato (born in Castellammare di Stabia, 5 July 1957) is an Italian actor, writer and politician.

== Biography ==
Amato has worked in cinema, television and theatre. He is famous for his numerous participations in television series such as La squadra, Il Grande Torino, L'uomo sbagliato, L'ultimo padrino, Crimini e Il coraggio di Angela.

He is also the author of novels, including The Witness of 2009 (finalist for the Bancarella Prize). Amato also writes for cabaret, theatre and cinema.

== Political activity ==
During the regional elections campaign 2010, he was a candidate for regional councillor for the province of Naples, obtaining 1,659 votes and not being elected.

Subsequently, he joined the Five Star Movement and in the 2022 Italian general election he was a candidate for the Chamber of Deputies in the single-member constituency Campania 1 – 07 (Torre del Greco), being elected with 34.3% (equal to 51,089 votes) ahead of Annarita Patriarca of the centre-right (33.99%) and Sandro Ruotolo of the centre-left (21.79%).

=== Political views ===
On his Facebook profile, dealing with foreign policy, he strongly criticized the president of Ukraine Volodymyr Zelenskyj and the President of the United States Joe Biden; from an internal point of view, however, he expressed himself polemically against Giuseppe Conte, Luigi Di Maio and Rocco Casalino, as well as, in 2014, against the 5-Star Movement itself, which prevented the actor from running as a candidate on their lists due to the previous experience, albeit as an independent, in the lists of Italia dei Valori, arriving at defining the discipline of the M5S "Ku Klux Klan rules", while confirming his vote for training. Furthermore, in 2015, again on Facebook, he harshly attacked politicians who opposed cutting annuities.

== Filmography ==
=== Cinema ===
- La posta in gioco, directed by Sergio Nasca (1987)
- Street Kids, directed by Nanni Loy (1989)
- Pacco, doppio pacco e contropaccotto, directed by Nanni Loy (1993)
- Giovanni Falcone, directed by Giuseppe Ferrara (1993)
- Malesh - Lascia che sia, directed by Angelo Cannavacciuolo (1993)
- Pianese Nunzio, 14 anni a maggio, directed by Antonio Capuano (1996)
- Il sindaco, directed by Ugo Fabrizio Giordani (1996)
- Tre uomini e una gamba, directed by Aldo, Giovanni e Giacomo e Massimo Venier (1997)
- Santo Stefano, directed by Angelo Pasquini (1997)
- Un bel dì vedremo, directed by Tonino Valerii (1997)
- Crimine contro crimine, directed by Aldo Florio (1999)
- Un nuovo giorno, directed by Aurelio Grimaldi (1999)
- Il manoscritto di Van Hecken, directed by Nicola De Rinaldo (1999)
- Senza movente, directed by Luciano Odorisio (1999)
- Nella terra di nessuno, directed by Gianfranco Giagni (1999)
- I banchieri di Dio - Il caso Calvi, directed by Giuseppe Ferrara (2002)
- Un mondo d'amore, directed by Aurelio Grimaldi (2003)
- Signora, directed by Francesco Laudadio (2004)
- Verso nord, directed by Stefano Reali (2004)
- Segui le ombre, directed by Lucio Gaudino (2004)
- Padiglione 22, directed by Livio Bordone (2006)
- Liberarsi: figli di una rivoluzione minore directed by Salvatore Romano (2007)
- Se sarà luce sarà bellissimo - Moro: Un'altra storia, directed by Aurelio Grimaldi (2008)
- Basilicata coast to coast, directed by Rocco Papaleo (2009)
- Una vita violata, directed by Riccardo Sesani (2009)
- Linea di konfine, directed by Fabio Massa (2009)
- To Rome with Love, directed by Woody Allen (2012)
- All Roads Lead to Rome, directed by Ella Lemhagen (2015)
- A Napoli non-piove mai, directed by Sergio Assisi (2014)
- Natale col boss, directed by Volfango De Biasi (2015)
- Il viaggio, directed by Alfredo Arciero (2017)
- Ed è subito sera, directed by Claudio Insegno (2018)
- A mano disarmata, directed by Claudio Bonivento (2019)
- Io Giusy, directed by Nilo Sciarrone (2021)

== Italian dubbing ==
- Elio Zamuto in Giovanni Falcone

== See also ==
- List of members of the Italian Chamber of Deputies, 2022–
