= Ramba (actress) =

Italian pornographic actress

- Born: Ileana Carisio; 19 September 1967 (age 58); Salerno, Italy
- Other name: Malù

Ileana Carisio, best known with the stage names of Ramba, Malù or Malù Ramba (born 19 September 1967) is an Italian former pornographic actress whose career spanned over six years.

== Biography ==
Carusio studied singing and then worked as a model and fashion model. She began her career as a porn star after meeting a man in Genoa, Riccardo Schicchi, founder and manager of the agency "Diva Futura"; she was the first actress to join the agency in 1983. Her statuesque beauty of the Mediterranean type guaranteed her success almost immediately. In 1986 Carusio participated in the live show, delicious curves, alongside to Cicciolina, Moana Pozzi and Cornelia Oltean. The show was an incredible success, but her innumerable controversies caused a legal trial for a complaint of obscenity which ended with a sentence of six months and a fine for Riccardo Schicchi and the actresses. She made her film debut in 1987, in Abat-jour, a soft-core film directed by Lorenzo Onorati and in which she was the main actress alongside Aldo Sambrell and Baby Pozzi.

Carusio retired around 1990.

== Comics ==
A comics based on her character was published between 1992 and 1994.

== Filmography ==
- I vizi segreti degli italiani quando credono di non essere visti (1987)
- Abat-jour (1988)
- Femmine (1988)
- Eravamo così (1989)
- Il vizio di Baby e l'ingordigia di Ramba (1989)
- La Storia di Lady Chatterley (1989)
- Lady Emanuelle (1989)
- L'amante (1989)
- Rose Bluelight (1989)
- Games of Desire (1990)
- Scent of Passion (1990)
- La strana voglia (1990)
- Impudicizia (1991)
- Una Donna per tutti (1991)
- Gatta alla pari (1993)
- Innamorata (1995)
- La settima stanza (1995)
