= Hikikomori Italia =

Mental health association in Italy

Hikikomori Italy
- National Association in regards of Voluntary Social Retreat
- Hikikomori Italia
- Formation: 2017; 9 years ago
- Founded at: Italy
- Headquarters: Nerviano (MI), Via Monfalcone 2
- Region served: Italy, Vatican City
- Official language: Italian
- President: Marco Crepaldi
- Affiliations: Hikikomori Italia Genitori
- Website: https://www.hikikomoriitalia.it/

Hikikomori Italia or National Association in regards of Voluntary Social Retreat is an association created in 2017 by Marco Crepaldi, and is also the parent organization affiliated to Hikikomori Italia Genitori (English: Hikikomori Italy Parents). The association is active in almost every region of Italy and offers in-home or online help for hikikomori and their parents. The association also involved itself in the national discourse around the topic of hikikomori in Italy and publicized its opinions on quantitative studies and definitions of surrounding the phenomenon. As of 2026 the Hikikomori Italy association has been mentioned by the Italian government in numerous papers citing their estimates on the overall population of hikikomori in Italy and the possibility to cooperate with the association in campaigns to combat the phenomenon on a national scale. Before the creation of the association Marco Crepaldi, its founder, managed a blog under the same name.

== Purpose ==
The association states that its goal is "to combat and reduce voluntary social isolation (hikikomori) and all potentially related problems [...] through information and awareness-raising activities, direct support, counseling, and training". The association offers its services to thousands of families with members affected by hikikomori syndrome.

== History ==
=== Background ===
==== Social background ====
A map of Mezzogiorno (Southern Italy) and Settentrione (Northern Italy)

The very first identification of the phenomenon in Italy were in 2007, when the term started to be used to identify sporadic instances.

On 12 April 2008, interviewer Claudia Pierdominici managed to interview Tamaki Saitō, who coined the term "hikikomori". During the interview they discussed filial dependence in Japan, Korea and Italy (specifically the term "mammoni" in Italy) and also the presence of hikikomori in Italy, specifically in Sicily.

Carla Ricci, an Italian-Japanese researcher, confronted the phenomenon of Hikikomori in Italy with the one in Japan and recorded that there are similarities between the two societies. The social elements in common with Japan which generated the phenomenon in Italy, according to her research, included: "families overprotecting their own children, narcissism, close relationship between mother and child and uncertainty caused by social conditions, which may lead some individuals to withdraw socially, especially those who are emotionally fragile". These similarities were also observed by other researchers who confirmed some of them, such as Antonio Piotti who also noted that Italian and Japanese Hikikomori shared "school phobia, similar relationship dynamics with their mothers, and hobbies revolving around imagination".

In 2017, Karin Bagnato, also identified the existence of a Hikikomori phenomenon in Italy and stated that it was also affected by the North–south divide in Italy. According to the research, Southern hikikomori are more common in middle-lower class families, often have more siblings, and tend to exhibit violent outbursts and anger issues, particularly toward overprotective mothers, reflecting stronger mother/child symbiosis. Northern hikikomori show fewer of such behaviors, influenced by their different social surrounding and economic conditions.

==== National background prior to the formation ====
Historical analysis on the topic in 2013 suggests that the Italian National Federation of the Orders of Physicians, Surgeons and Dentists had identified up to 240,000 socially withdrawn individuals in the country, without however labelling them as "Hikikomori". Meanwhile, also in 2013, the Italian Psychiatry Society had estimated that up to 3,000,000 individuals between the age range of 15 to 40 years old had exhibited symptoms of being "Hikikomori". This latest estimate is challenged due to the common confusion in estimates between Hikikomori, NEET and simple internet addiction disorder.

In 2013 Francesco de Michele published a case study of a 28-year-old man in Italy who had spent the last 10 years "in a state of almost complete isolation" and only using the internet as a way to communicate with the outside world. He identified this individual as a "clear" case of an Italian Hikikomori.

=== Blog period (2013 – 2017) ===
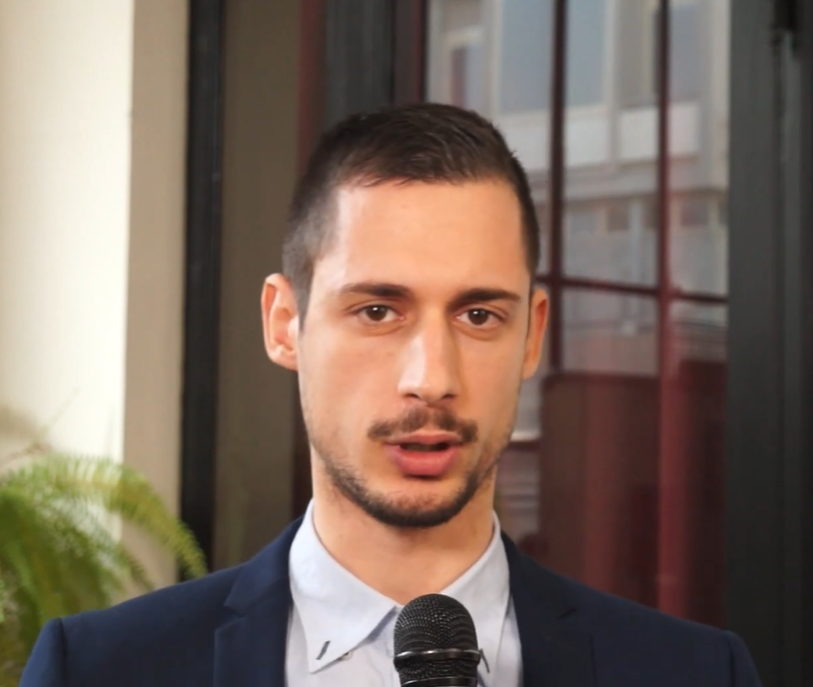
Marco Crepaldi, founder of the blog and association in an interview in 2018.

The origins of the association date back to 2013, when the "association" was merely an online blog with active users posting up to 10,000 messages a day at the time. The blog itself was created by Marco Crepaldi who specializes in social psychology and digital communication and at the time had just made a thesis on the topic released to the University of Milano-Bicocca.

Two kinds of people approached the blog at the time: people who wanted to be part of a community and worried parents requesting help and ignorant on what to do.

The objective of the blog was to raise public and institutional awareness on the topic and also create a net of support for those affected by the phenomenon. According to primary sources, 3,000 members were subscribed to the blog upon its creation.

The blog had at some point become its own Facebook group in September 2016.

=== Activities as an association (2017 onwards) ===
==== 2017 ====
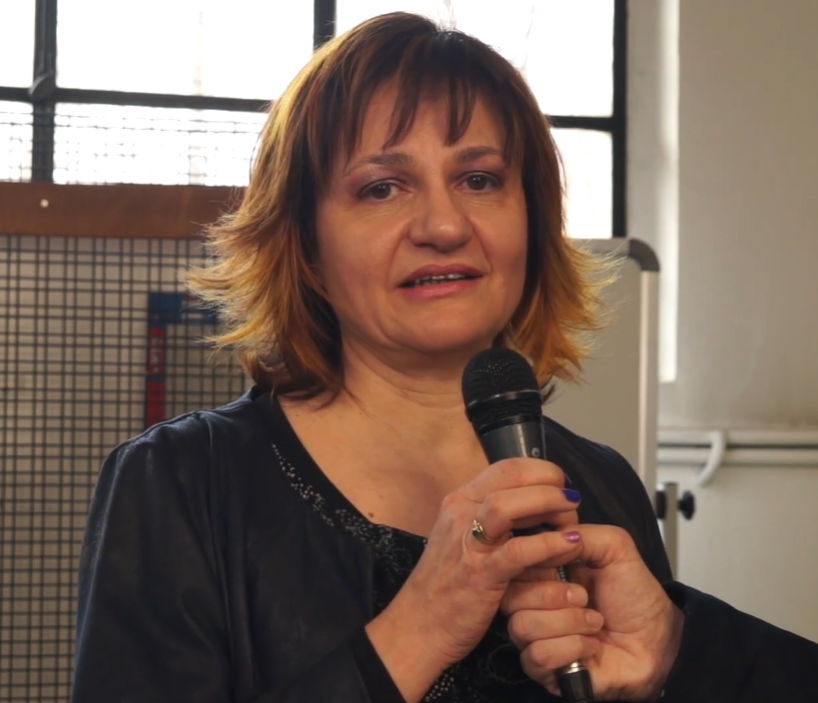
Elena Carolei, president of the Hikikomori Italia Genitori association in 2018, the parent-oriented sister association of Hikikomori Italia

In 2017 the online blogs transforms into a proper association, and in June 2017 "Hikikomori Italia Genitori" is also founded, aimed at offering "support to the parental role, to combat the voluntary social withdrawal of their children" and with Elena Carolei as acting president of the association.

==== 2018 ====
In February 2018 the Facebook group had 800 members and 600 active users in the overall online community exchanging up to 10,000 messages a day. In that year the association, alongside its affiliated organization, Hikikomori Italia Genitori, planned out an awareness campaign on a national level in various regions including Campania, Emilia Romagna, Lombardy and Piedmont.

On 20 February 2018 Hikikomori Italia Genitori, in collaboration with the Regional School Office for Piedmont, Forte Chance Piemonte, the Candellieri Favero Association, ASAPI, and the IIS Avogadro of Turin, and sponsored officially by the Metropolitan City of Turin and the Piedmont Region organized a convention in which experts (and members of the association), parents, and school officials discussed the phenomenon, its symptoms, online community, diagnostic challenges, public health responses, and school inclusion strategies. The event drew significant media coverage and attention. 200 people participated. The convention had a regional focus, and within it, it was stated that at least five new Hikikomori cases occurred monthly in the city of Turin alone.

A video published by the Metropolitan City of Turin on the convention by Hikikomori Italia that took place in Turin, 20 February 2018.

Following the conference in February 2018, on 19 October 2018 the Piedmont region decuded to release an official "memorandum of understanding" between itself, the Regional School Office for Piedmont (Ministry of Education, University, and Research), and the Hikikomori Italia and Hikikomori Genitori Association. The protocol recognized Hikikomori as a "growing phenomenon" that impact people between 14 and 30 year old. The protocol was signed to raise awareness and action in public spaces as to limit such phenomenon.

On 15 March 2018, 13:30 UTC, a conference by Hikikomori Italia took place in Naples in collaboration with "Genitori Campani" (Campanian parents).

On 20 April 2018 the Hikikomori Italia association held a conference in Zelarino, Venice, with the patronage the Municipality of Venice, the Order of Psychologists of Veneto, and the OMCeO lagoon association. Venetian speakers called for practical interventions at the community level, including home visits, individualized school plans and a network of support for Hikikomori, highlighting the association's role.

Up until 20 April 2018 the "Punta di Ferro" mall in Forlì hosted an awareness campaign portal organized by Hikikomori Italia and CNCC.

On 5 November 2018 the Emilia-Romagna region announced the "Regional Multiannual Plan for Adolescence (lasting from 2018–2020)", which formally recognizes hikikomori as an emerging form of adolescent distress, distinct from open conflict and characterized by extreme isolation and withdrawal from school, social life, and even family environments. In the document the region committed itself to evaluating the possibility of a memorandum of understanding with the Regional School Office and the Hikikomori Italia Genitori Association regarding the topic in order to work together against the rising problem.

On 11 December 2018, Marco Crepaldi, the President of the Hikikomori Italia association, participated in a convention named "Videogames, betting and social withdrawal. When the virtual surpasses reality" organized by the Auto Mutuo Aiuto Trento Association (AMA) in collaboration with the Municipality of Trento and the Progetto 92 cooperative. During the convention Crepaldi stated that all of the Hikikomori cases identified and helped by the association in Trentino were male and within the middle school age range (11 years old to 14 years old).

==== 2019 ====
On 4 March 2019 Hikikomori Italia and the Editorial Society of Milan jointly hosted the "Hikikomori, il fenomeno invisibile" event.

On 9 April 2019, Marco Crepaldi, in behalf of the Hikikomori Italia association participated in the "Challenges of adolescence: The Hikikomori phenomenon" conference held in Bologna by the Metropolitan City of Bologna, Gian Franco Minguzzi Institution and CTSS Metropolitana with the patronage of the Italian Ministry of Education, University, and Research.

On 6 May 2019 the association was guested to speak about the Hikikomori phenomenon in a conference in San Benedetto del Tronto, moderated by Paola Petrucci, the Equality Councilor for the Province of Ascoli Piceno.

Between 10 May 2019 and 11 May 2019 the Hikikomori Italia association participated, in Rimini, alongside the Minotauro foundation, numerous special guests and the South Tyrolean Edizioni Centro Studi Erickson in a conference focused on Hikikomoris. Thousands of participants were expected, including members of the Italian Society of Transfusion Medicine and Immunohematology.

On 11 May 2019 it was decided by Hikikomori Italia that their online spaces would become inactive from then on due to the impossibility by the association to fully moderate such spaces and to also verify the age of the users.

On 24 September 2019, Tiziana Testoni, the Hikikomori Italia association coordinator of Parma and Piacenza area, participated in the "Aspettando la buona battaglia" ("Awaiting the good battle") conference held in Parma in order to promote the book "Generazione Hikikomori. Isolarsi dal mondo tra web e manga" written by writer Anna Maria Caresta.

On 1 December 2019 Vatican City-based Caritas Internationalis and Hikikomori Italia jointly launched the "Hikikomori project", funded through 8x1000 funds. The project's aim is to study the phenomenon and understand it in order to act against it.

On 5 December 2019 the Hikikomori Italia association held a conference in Marche for the very first time. It is also the very first time the association ever operated in the region.

==== 2020 ====
On 22 January 2020 a convention held by the Department of Welfare, Family, and Adolescents of the Municipality of Civitanova Marche, the Women's Information Help Desk, and the Praxis Association of Macerata regarding the topic of Hikikomori. They were given the patronage by the Order of Social Workers of the Marche Region and Association of Hikikomori Italia in a joint statement.

On 3 February 2020 the Hikikomori Italia association signed a "memorandum of understanding" with the Regional Health Service and the Municipality of Cesena, Emilia-Romagna, and the region allocated funds to fight the phenomenon in their 2020 budget.

By November 2020 it was reported that the association Hikikomori Italia Genitori had 600 members and around 60 local parent support groups active across 17 regions of Italy, thus excluding the Aosta Valley, Basilicata and Molise.

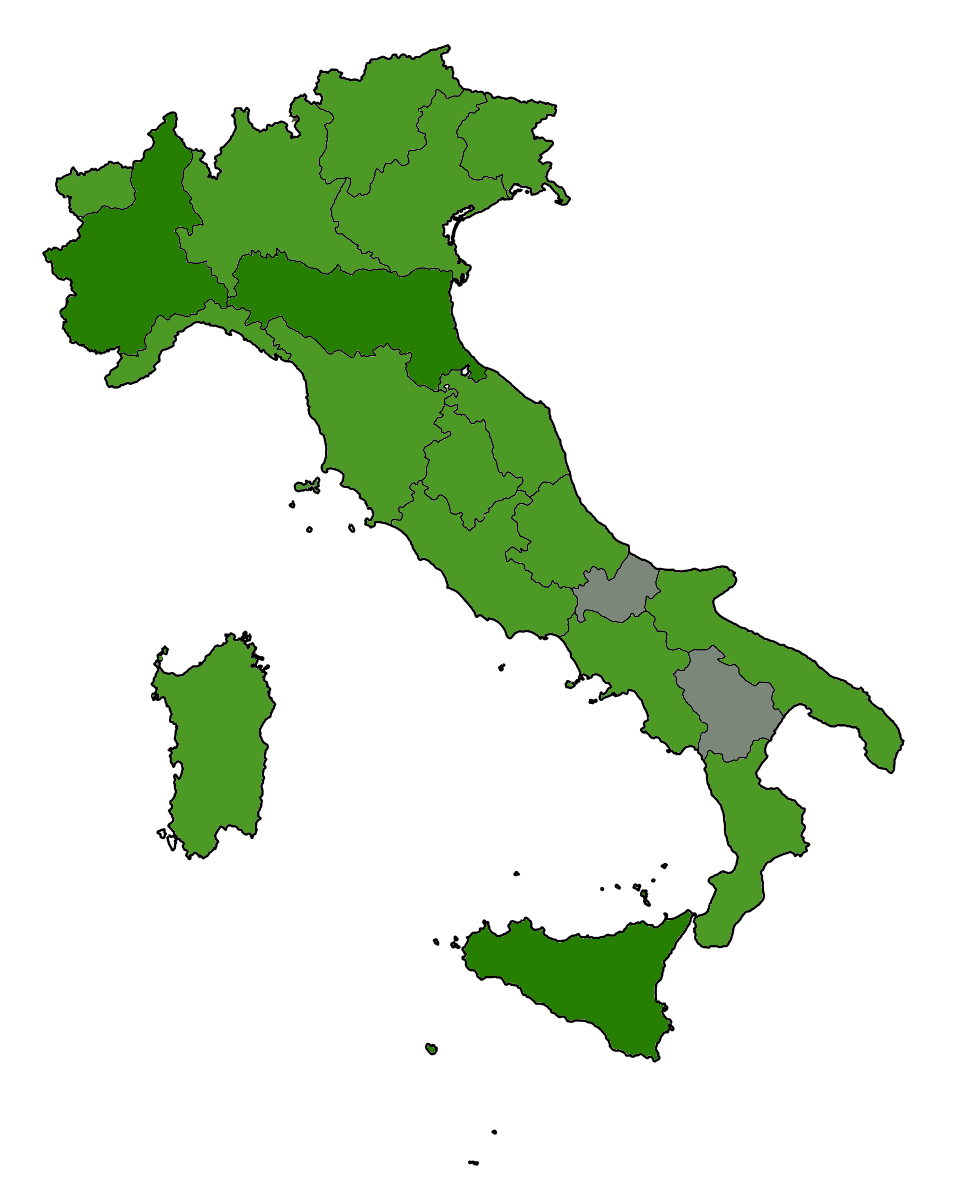
Map of regions where Hikikomori Italia operates in Regions where the association has a memorandum of understanding in, and at least an office Regions where the association has at least one active office Regions where the association is active but has no official offices in

==== 2021 ====
In April 2021, it was reported by Italian newspaper Corriere della Sera that dozens of families had requested help to the Hikikomori Italia association in the city of Brescia, and that the phenomenon was rising locally.

On 28 December 2021 it was announced that the Hikikomori Italia association would have an active office in the autonomous region of the Aosta Valley, an area where it had never operated before. This was done thanks to the help of project Movi-Menti, and its partner cooperatives Noi e Gli Altri and Enaip VdA.

==== 2022 ====
On 10 March 2022 a "memorandum of understanding" was signed by Hikikomori Italia Genitori, Hikikomori Italia, the Order of Psychologists of Sicily, and the Italian Society of Pediatric Psychology with the approval of the region in order to fight the phenomenon in Sicily. Thanks to the memorandum, starting from May 2022, pamphlets promoting awareness and prevention of Hikikomori syndrome were distributed in high schools in Palermo by the General Directorate of the Regional Education Office for Sicily and the Hikikomori Italia Genitori association.

On 18 October 2023 the association was formally mentioned by the Chambers of Deputies alongside its estimate of the overall population of Hikikomori in Italy.

==== 2023 ====
In 2023 the Health Commission of Italy held an hearing chaired by Vice President Domenico Rossi and proposed by Democratic Party member Diego Sarno. Diego Sarno shared his will to propose future policies on the matter of Hikikomori in Italy. In that same conference, Elena Carolei, the president of the parent wing of the association, stated the association was currently supporting "4,000 families, approximately 400 of which are in Piedmont".

==== 2025 ====
On 26 February 2025 the first regional law on the prevention of Hikikomori is firmed in Apulia. In the law decree the association is mentioned, and its definition of Hikikomori is explicitly cited.

On 27 February 2025 Five Star Movement MP Antonio Caso organized jointly with the Hikikomori Italia association a conference in Palazzo Montecitorio, the seat of the Chamber of Deputies, the lower house of the Italian Parliament. Italian radio host Rajae Bezzaz was also present at the conference.

On 6 March 2025 the Italian parliament discussed the possibility to involve the Hikikomori Italia association in a direct campaign to combat the phenomenon and discussed possible cooperation with it.

On 28 July 2025 Panathlon International and Hikikomori Italia signed a memorandum of understanding with the aim to fight the phenomenon of hikikomori in Italy via Panathlon's official channels.

On 27 October 2025 a conference by Hikikomori Italia association took place in Cagliari in the Council Chamber of the Regional Council of Sardinia. Following the conference, Regional authorities stressed the urgent need for coordinated policies, resources, and training to protect youth well-being, recognizing Hikikomori as a potential risk.

On 22 November 2025 a convention took place in Bisceglie, with the president of the Hikikomori Italia Genitori association being present.

==== 2026 ====
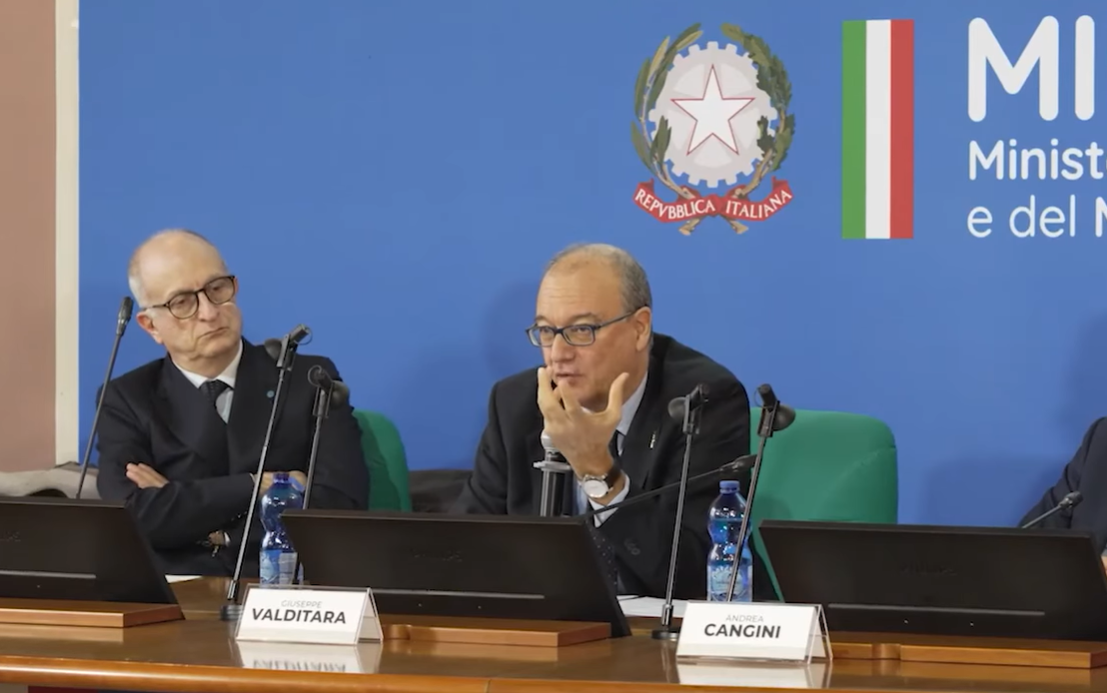
A photo of the convention that took place on 11 February 2026 in the Ministry of Education, University and Research where Hikikomori Italia's president, Marco Crepaldi, was invited to speak

In January 2026, Hikikomori Italia was one of the funders and supporters of the Reconnect Project alongside the European Union's Erasmus+ program. The project aims to reintegrate European hikikomoris into public society and sees the collaboration of various associations across the European Union.

On 11 February 2026 the Ministry of Education, University and Research organized a convention called "Book, Paper, and Pen. The Value of Reading and Writing on Paper in the Age of Artificial Intelligence". The convention was chaired by Minister Giuseppe Valditara and was moderated by Andrea Cangini. Marco Crepaldi was officially invited and represented his association during the meeting. President Marco Crepaldi, during the convention, highlighted how isolation could possibly, according to him, fuel a new form of emotional dependence on artificial intelligence.

Between 2 May and 3 May 2026, the 2026 Cammini di Francesco festival in Montone and Perugia dedicated itself to spreading awareness of the hikikomori phenomenon in Italy, selling out all of its tickets on its first day. One of the guests was Kenta Suzuki, who announced to donate all his cachet from the event to Hikikomori Italia. Other guests included Concita De Gregorio and Erica Mou. A regional representative of the Hikikomori Italia organization was also present, Lorena Fabi.

Daniela Ruffino, from Action party, alongside Hikikomori Italia, proposed a national law to sustain families with hikikomoris within them, with a 50 million annual budget.

On 4 June 2026, Raffaele Aveta, member of the Five Star Movement, jointly with Hikikomori Italia, presented a law proposal for the local handling of the hikikomori phenomenon to the Regional Council of Campania.

== Services ==
=== Assistance to hikikomori ===
The association states that they offer psychological help online or in-home. Psychologists interacting with clients are voluntarily trained and selected by the association to aid hikikomori in needs and their families. Services by the association are completely free and funded through the use of the money the association gains from 5x1000 funds.

=== Assistance to parents ===
Hikikomori Italia and Hikikomori Italia Parenti offer a plan composed of six phases in order to assist parents of hikikomori individuals.

The first step is to introduce parents of hikikomori to the national online mutual-support group offered by the association, fostering discussions with others in similar situations and helping to reduce feelings of isolation. The second step of support offered by the association is to encourage parents to deepen their understanding of the hikikomori phenomenon through video lectures and personal testimonials from other people in similar situations. The third step is to involve parents in regional groups, allowing them to actively participate in in-person meetings guided by association-affiliated psychologists. During the fourth step, parents participate in seminars and events organized by the association. Once reached the fifth step, the parent will have changed significantly their attitude toward their child, building one based on reciprocal trust. The final phase, number six, involves individual and family psychotherapy.

=== Headquarter ===
The headquarter of the association is located in Nerviano, Milan, in Via Montefalcone street, number 2. Both of the sister associations have the same headquarter.

== Research and estimates ==
=== Hikikomori phases ===
According to Hikikomori Italia and its founder and president there are "three phases" of hikikomori, the third being the most problematic.

==== Phase one (Pre-Hikikomori) ====
According to Hikikomori Italia, in this phase pre-hikikomoris sporadically refuse to attend class or public meetings and start to abandon activities such as sports or other social events. This is due perceivance of a drive towards social isolation.

==== Phase two ====
According to the association's own definition, phase two is when the person stops going to school or to other public spaces, only keeping relations with their parents and online friends. Hikikomori Italia states that it's a mistake to cut off internet and encourages to discuss about the situation with the school, which can offer a personalized educational plan if necessary. The negative emotions experienced during social interactions is associated with direct relationships, which in this stage are completely rejected.

==== Phase three ====
According to Hikikomori Italia, the third phase begins when the individual is almost fully isolated and starts cutting relations with their parents and online friends/spaces. This is the most vulnerable phase and individuals within it have a higher risk of developing psychopathologies according to the association.

=== Estimates from the association ===
Back in March 2023 the association claimed there were 100,000 hikikomori in Italy, and according to a research on 288 parents who were members of the Association at the time 87% of them were male and were aged 20 years old on average, with also a significant margin for people aged around 15 years old. This was in contrast with the nationally held quantitative study of 2023 which stated that 44.000 and 54.000 were hikikomoris.

In 2024, the average age also had changed, with the association stating that the average age was now around 15 years old.

In 2025 the association estimated that there were 200,000 hikikomori in Italy, double then the previous estimates. The average age was now around 22 years old, whilst the percentage of female hikikomori had increased, with the male population now being 80% of the total. The estimate was done involving over 400 participants.

=== Statements on the 2023 National Research Council's quantitative study ===
Following the release of the first quantitative study on the phenomenon of hikikomori in Italy, pursued by Italian Institute of Clinical Physiology (part of the National Research Council) together with Gruppo Abele Onlus, Hikikomori Italia released a critique of it on their official website.

Hikikomori Italia stated that the study's conclusion that the phenomenon is more prevalent in central and southern Italy contrasts with the association's own experience, which it reports as consisting largely of requests for assistance from northern regions.

The association also questioned several aspects of the study's methodology, including what it considered a low reported proportion of individuals who had experienced bullying, the lack of clarity regarding the duration defined as a "significant period of isolation," and the fact that the data were collected during the COVID-19 pandemic. Hikikomori Italia further noted that, as acknowledged by the study itself, the sample consisted of students still attending school and therefore did not include individuals who had already dropped out, or what it called "Phase 2 Hikikomoris".

== Criticism ==
According to Angela Laera from the Association of Cognitive Psychology the estimates given by Hikikomori Italia on the numbers of Hikikomori present in Italy are not accurate as they base themselves merely from the requests and subjects that interact with the association itself rather than on a statistical analysis.

== Filmography ==
The Hikikomori Italia Genitori association aided in the creation of the 2023 movie The Snail, in which the protagonist is a 15 year old Hikikomori who secluded herself in her own room for the last 33 days, having lost trust in everyone but her grandfather. The movie was directed and scripted by Roberto Gasparro.

== See also ==
- Hikikomori
