= Viaggio =

Viaggio may refer to:

- Viaggio Air, a former Bulgarian airline
- Siemens Viaggio Comfort, a railroad passenger car
- Siemens Viaggio Light, a single-deck passenger train
- Fiat Viaggio, a compact sedan based on the Dodge Dart (PF)

== See also ==
- Il viaggio (disambiguation)
