= Bets and Wedding Dresses =

- Directed by: Vincenzo Terracciano
- Starring: Sergio Castellitto
- Cinematography: Fabio Cianchetti
- Edited by: Marco Spoletini
- Music by: Nicola Piovani
- Release date: 2009
- Country: Italy
- Language: Italian

Bets and Wedding Dresses (Italian: Tris di donne e abiti nuziali) is a 2009 Italian drama film written and directed by Vincenzo Terracciano. It was screened out of competition at the 66th Venice International Film Festival.

== Cast ==
- Sergio Castellitto: Franco Campanella
- Martina Gedeck: Josephine Campanella
- Paolo Briguglia: Giovanni Campanella
- Raffaella Rea: Luisa Campanella
- Iaia Forte: Mariellina
- Elena Bouryka: Caterina
- Gigio Morra: Matteo
- Flavio Parenti: Fabrizio
