= Il viaggio =

Il viaggio may refer to:

- The Voyage (1921 film), an Italian silent drama film
- The Voyage (1974 film), an Italian film
- Il viaggio (2017 film), an Italian film
