= Michela Rostan =

Italian politician (born 1982)

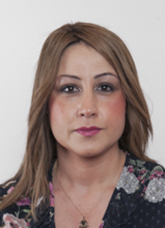
- Rostan in 2018

Member of the Chamber of Deputies
- In office 15 March 2013 – 12 October 2022
- Constituency: Campania 1 (2013–2018); Campania 1 – P01 (2018–2022)

Personal details
- Born: 25 January 1982 (age 44)
- Party: Lega (since 2024)

Michela Rostan (born 25 January 1982) is an Italian politician serving as a member of the Regional Council of Campania since 2025. From 2013 to 2022, she was a member of the Chamber of Deputies.
