= Vittoria Risi =

Italian pornographic actress (born 1978)

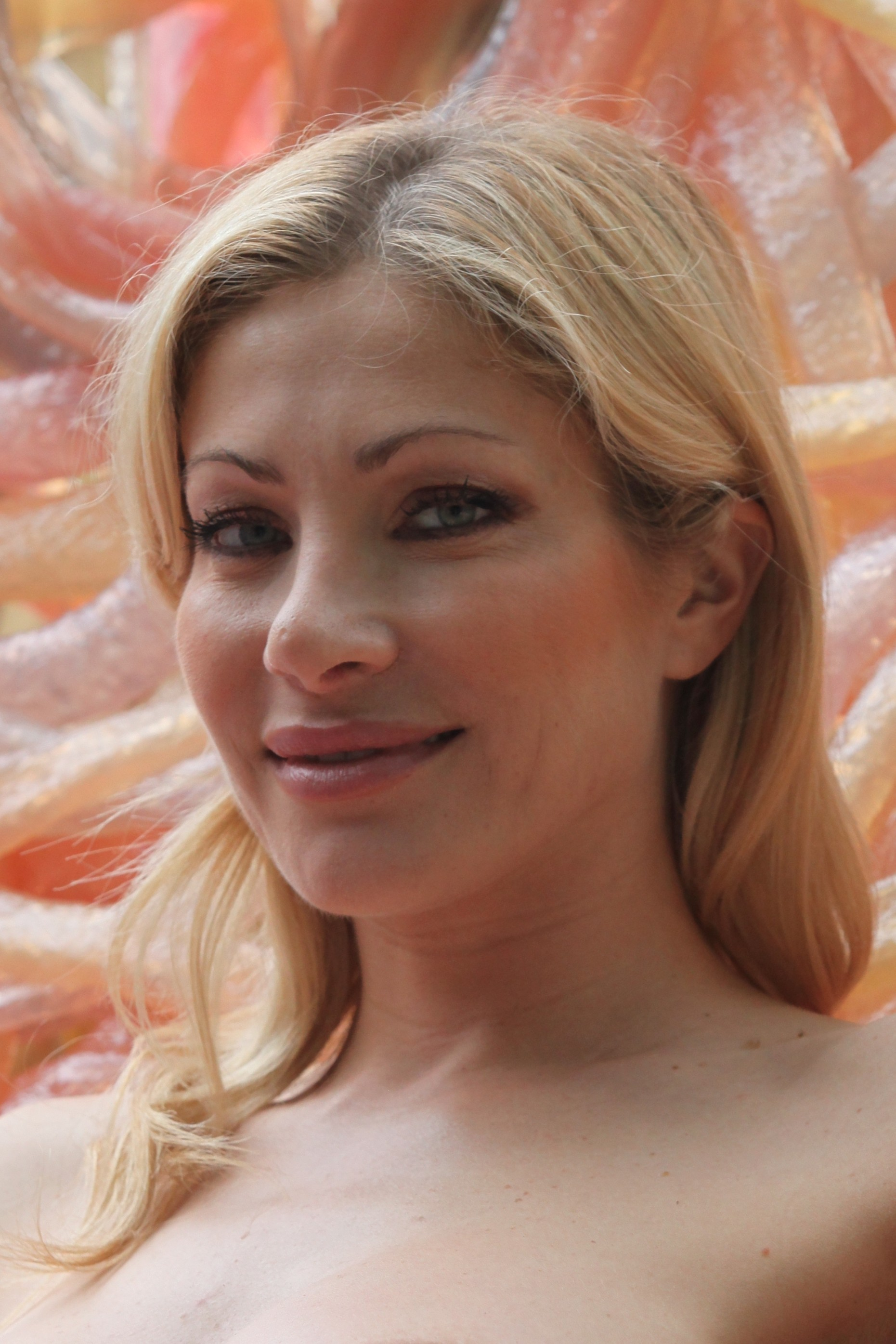
- Vittoria Risi at the 2011 Venice Biennale
- Born: Tiziana Zennaro; 3 November 1978 (age 47); Venice, Italy.

Tiziana Zennaro, best known as Vittoria Risi (born 3 November 1978) is an Italian pornographic actress and television personality.

== Life and career ==
Born in Pellestrina, Venice (Italy), Risi graduated from the Academy of Fine Arts, then she started a career as a real estate agent in her hometown and as a painter. She debuted in the adult industry in 2008, starring in the film Barcelona in love.

In June 2008, Risi took part in the Sky Italia docufiction Ciak, si giri!. In 2010 she played Moana Pozzi in I Segreti di Moana directed by Riccardo Schicchi. The same year she featured a human representation of the Giorgione's paint "La Nuda" in an exhibition about the artist at Palazzo Grimani in Venice. In 2011 Risi took part in the 54th edition of the Venice Biennale of Contemporary Art posing nude in the installation of Gaetano Pesce, part of the "Italian Pavilion" curated by Vittorio Sgarbi.

Risi appeared on several television programs including Matrix, Stracult, Ciao Darwin, Artù and Niente di personale. She also starred in the practical jokes of the FX show Sexy Camera all’italiana (2011-2012).

== Awards ==
- 2010 Venus Award - Best Newcomer Actress (Europe)
