= Marta Schifone =

Italian politician (born 1980)

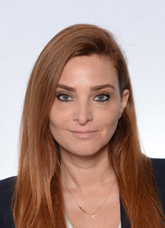
- Schifone in 2022

Member of the Chamber of Deputies
- Incumbent
- Assumed office 13 October 2022
- Constituency: Campania 1

Personal details
- Born: 9 October 1980 (age 45)
- Party: Brothers of Italy
- Parent: Luciano Schifone (father)

Marta Schifone (born 9 October 1980) is an Italian politician of Brothers of Italy who was elected member of the Chamber of Deputies in 2022. She is the daughter of former MEP Luciano Schifone.

== Biography ==
The daughter of Luciano Schifone, a member of the MSI, AN, and PdL parties who served multiple terms as a regional councilor, regional councilor, and Member of the European Parliament, she was born in Naples, where she earned a degree with honors in Pharmacy from the University of Naples Federico II. She later specialized in Cosmetology at the University of Ferrara and is a member of the Italian Society of Chemistry and Cosmetological Sciences (SICC).
