= Dio c'è =

- Directed by: Alfredo Arciero
- Written by: Alfredo Arciero
- Starring: Riccardo Rossi; Chiara Noschese
- Cinematography: Roberto Benvenuti
- Edited by: Paolo Benassi
- Music by: Fabrizio Bondi
- Release date: August 21, 1998
- Running time: 80 minutes
- Country: Italy
- Language: Italian

Dio c'è is a 1998 Italian comedy film directed by Alfredo Arciero.

== Cast ==
- Riccardo Rossi as Riccardo
- Chiara Noschese as Chiara
- Daniele Formica as Barbone
- Ivo Garrani as Ettore
- Wanna Marchi as Chiara's mother
- Miranda Martino as Riccardo's mother
- Luigi Montini as Mangoni
- Elisabetta Pezzoni as Roberta
- Maurizio Santilli as Vinicio
