= Family Game (2007 film) =

- Directed by: Alfredo Arciero
- Written by: Alfredo Arciero; Marina Polla De Luca
- Starring: Sandra Ceccarelli; Stefano Dionisi; Fabio Troiano
- Cinematography: Stefano Paradiso
- Edited by: Paolo Benassi
- Music by: Louis Siciliano
- Release date: October 2007 (Festival du Film Italien de Villerupt)
- Running time: 94 minutes
- Country: Italy
- Language: Italian

Family Game is a 2007 Italian drama film directed by Alfredo Arciero.

== Cast ==
- Sandra Ceccarelli as Lisa
- Stefano Dionisi as Vittorio
- Fabio Troiano as Andrea
- Mattia Cicinelli as Mattia
- Elena Bouryka as Martina
- Manuela Spartà as Valeria
- Eros Pagni as the father
