= Michele Schiano di Visconti =

Italian politician (born 1962)

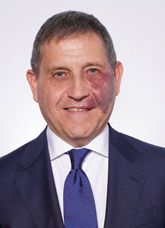
- Schiano Di Visconti in 2022

Member of the Chamber of Deputies
- Incumbent
- Assumed office 13 October 2022
- Constituency: Campania 1

Personal details
- Born: 26 February 1962 (age 64)
- Party: Brothers of Italy

Michele Schiano di Visconti (born 26 February 1962) is an Italian politician of Brothers of Italy who was elected member of the Chamber of Deputies in 2022. Since 2024, he has served as secretary of Brothers of Italy in Naples.

== Biography ==
Born in Mugnano di Napoli (Naples), he earned a degree in medicine and surgery from the University of Naples Federico II and began working as a medical director at ASL Napoli 2 Nord, combining his professional career with political activities.

In 2011, he became an adjunct professor for the sports science degree program at the Parthenope University of Naples.

He has been married to Ira Fele (born 1972) since September 17, 1998.
