= Antonella Salvucci =

Italian actress and journalist

- Born: 18 December 1981 (age 44); Civitavecchia, Lazio, Italy
- Occupation: Actress

Antonella Salvucci (born 18 December 1981) is an Italian actress and model.

== Biography ==
She began her career as a model, and later played roles in television dramas including Carabinieri, Il maresciallo Rocca, Distretto di Polizia, Un medico in famiglia 3, Rex, Era mio fratello, Il bello delle donne 2, La stagione dei delitti, and Moana.

In her film career, she has played various roles including the lead in Eugénie's Sentimental Education, directed by Aurelio Grimaldi, and minor roles in films including The Torturer by Lamberto Bava, The Family Friend by Paolo Sorrentino, Night of the Sinner by Alessandro Perrella, The Red Dot by Marco Carlucci,The Anger by Louis Nero, and Red Riding Hood by Giacomo Cimini.

In the field of television, she leads the cinema column, Ciak si gira on the internet channel Primo Italia TV. All editions of Fantafestival with prestigious names such as F. Murray Abraham, Roger Corman, Dario Argento, and all editions of Roma Film Festival with Giancarlo Giannini, Lina Wertmüller, Abel Ferrara, Willem Dafoe, on Rai 2 the TV Format dedicated to New Talents "New Stars Notte", and hosts other prestigious cinema awards in Italy and abroad.

In 2000, she released Fever. She made her theatrical debut in 2004 in the musical comedy Vampiri directed by Bruno Maccallini, and in 2008 she played the heroine Lara Croft in the musical Pulcinella directed by Lino Moretti.

In December 2020, she was awarded the Vincenzo Crocitti International Award.

=== Filmography ===
==== Fiction TV ====
- 2000 – Assassins accidentally directed by Vittorio De Sisti
- 2001 – Marshal Rocca 3 directed by Josè Maria Sanchez
- 2002 – The beauty of women 2 directed by Maurizio Ponzi
- 2003 – A doctor in the family directed by Claudio Norza
- 2003 – The season of crimes directed by Claudio Bonivento
- 2005 – Carabinieri 5 directed by Sergio Martino
- 2005 – Police District 5 directed by Lucio Gaudino
- 2007 – He was my brother directed by Claudio Bonivento
- 2008 – Damn director miserydirected by Lina Wertmüller
- 2009 – Moana directed by Alfredo Peyretti
- 2011 – Night before the exams'82 directed by Elisabetta Marchetti
- 2013 – The two laws directed by Luciano Manuzzi
- 2014 – The Restorer directed by Enrico Oldoini

==== Cinema ====
- 2002 – Open your eyes and dreams directed by Rosario Errico
- 2003 – The playground of the senses directed by Enrico Bernard
- 2003 – Crazy Blood directed by Gaetano Russo
- 2003 – The Red Dot directed by Giacomo Cimini
- 2005 – The Sentimental Education of Eugenie directed by Aurelio Grimaldi
- 2005 – The Torturer directed by Lamberto Bava
- 2006 – The Family Friend directed by Paolo Sorrentino
- 2006 – The red spot directed by Marco Carlucci
- 2008 – The anger directed by Louis Nero
- 2009 – Night of the Sinner directed by Alessandro Perrella
- 2011 – 5 directed by Francesco Dominedò
- 2011 – Bloody Sin directed by Domiziano Cristopharo
- 2011 – Young Europe directed by Matteo Vicino
- 2011 – Bellerofonte directed by Domiziano Cristopharo
- 2012 – Tulpa - Perdizioni mortali directed by Federico Zampaglione
- 2013 – Midway - Between life and death directed by John Real
- 2014 – The Second Chance directed by D. Gulli
- 2015 – Milano in the Cage directed by Fabio Bastianello
- 2015 – The Voice and the Diva directed by Michael Oblowitz
- 2016 – The American connection directed by J. Espanol
- 2016 – The Carillon directed by John Real
- 2017 – Feel the dead- the Rising directed by John Real
- 2017 – Odio la Juventus directed by L. Minoli
- 2018 – The Music Box directed by John Real
- 2018 – The Poison Rose directed by Francesco Cinquemani
- 2019 – Shelter directed by C.Bido

=== TV ===
- 2000 Gran Gala Academy of the Sanremo Song with Giancarlo Magalli
- Dal 2002 -Ciak turns (journal as video dedicated to deepening and film promotion)
- 2003 – Fantafestival (fino al 2011)
- 2004 – Roma Film Festival – Gala di cinema dedicated to Marcello Mastroianni su RaiSat Cinema World
- 2004 – Premio internazionale della Fotografia Cinematografica Gianni Di Venanzo (fino al 2010)
- 2006 – Trailers FilmFest (fino al 2013)
- 2006 – Format TV Numeri 1 su Rai 2
- 2006 – Premio Fregene per Fellini
- 2006 – Premio 80 anni Radiocorriere TV
- 2007 – XII Prize Sorrento Peninsula Arturo Esposito
- 2007 – 15 edition of Cinema Award Mirto D'Oro
- 2007 – Writing and Image Award Film Festival (fino al 2010)
- 2008 – Premio Flaiano 35^ edizione with Andrea Vianello su Rai 3
- 2008 – International Short Film Festival (fino al 2009)
- 2009 – New Stars Night format TV dedicato a Nuovi Talenti (fino al 2010) su Rai 2
- 2010 – 2nd Prize A literary fiction book in the drawer
- 2010 – Prize A life in film
- 2010 – Premio Flaiano 37^ edizione su Rai 3
- 2010 – Final Reate Festival su Rai 1
- 2011 – XI Edition of the Carthage International Award
- 2011 – International Award on Road Safety BLUE PLATE
- 2011 – 3rd Prize A literary fiction book in the drawer 3º Premio letterario di narrativa Un libro nel cassetto
- 2011 – Miss Summer Artwork Fashion
- 2011 – Premio Flaiano 38^ edizione with Dario Vergassola su Rai 3
- 2011 – 3^ 3 edition Maratea Film Festival
- 2011 – 3rd International Film Festival Award Valsele
- 2011 – 68 ^ Show On Film Festival of the Venice Biennale 68^
- 2011 – Italian Art and Fashion World
- 2012 – Premio Flaiano 39^ edizione with Dario Vergassola su Rai 3
- 2012 – 4th of fiction Literary Prize A book in the drawer
- 2012 – International Road Safety Award BLUE PLATE
- 2013 – XII Edition of The International Prize Carthage
- 2013 – National Final Competition High School Game with Alessandro Greco
- 2013 – A Dream For The Cinema Edition national competition
- 2013 – Fashion Award for A face model
- 2013 – 11°Angel Film Awards Monaco Internacional Film Festival
- 2014 – Gran Gala 64º Festival di Sanremo
- 2014 – National Final Competition High School Game with Alessandro Greco
- 2014 – XIII Edition of the International Prize Carthage
- 2014 – XII edition of War and Peace
- 2014 – XII Edition of TrailersFilmFest
- 2015 – Gran Gala 65th Sanremo Festival
- 2015 – 10th Festival of Cortinametraggio [
- 2015 – 15th Edition Grand Prix Corallo
- 2015 – Premio Flaiano 42^ edizione with Lucio Valentini
- 2015 – XIII Edizione di TrailersFilmFest
- 2016 – VI Gran Gala of Liguria Edition Numbers One city of Sanremo
- 2016 – Live From Cannes on Iris
- 2016 – National Final Competition High School Game with Alessandro Greco
- 2016 – Live From Ischia on Iris
- 2017 – VII Grand Gala of Liguria Edition Numbers One city of Sanremo

=== Advertising ===
- 2001 – Spot Televisivo Permaflex directed by Leone Pompucci
- 2004 – Testimonial Cerbiatto e Festival Crociere
- 2004 – Magazine Fotografare cover July
- 2009 – Magazine Elaborare Cover December
- 2010 – Magazine Cover Ruoteclassiche September
- 2010 – 2011 Televendita Ricapil Rapido, foam for hair loss, with Marco Di Buono
- 2011 – Testimonial book series tells Rome
- 2014 – Testimonial Postepay Fias Card
- 2014 – No Violence

=== Theater ===
- 2004 – Musical Vampiri directed by Bruno Maccallini at the Teatro De' Servi
- 2008 – Musical Pulcinella directed by Lino Moretti, in the role of Lara Croft at the Teatro Sistina

=== Other ===
==== Videoclip ====
- 2005 – Panico by B-Nice directed by Luigi Cozzi
- 2013 – Trasparente by Marco Rò directed by Angelo Puzzutiello
- 2014 – Come fossi un burattino by Falsidei
- 2015 – Polvere e cenere by Rione Roots

==== Discography ====
- 2000 – Fever by Antonella Salvucci, music by Roberto Russo
