= Marco Sarracino =

Italian politician (born 1989)

- Sarracino in 2022

Member of the Chamber of Deputies
- Incumbent
- Assumed office 13 October 2022
- Constituency: Campania 1

Personal details
- Born: 21 June 1989 (age 37) Villaricca
- Party: Democratic Party

Marco Sarracino (born 21 June 1989) is an Italian politician of the Democratic Party who was elected member of the Chamber of Deputies in 2022. Within the Democratic Party, he is responsible for Southern Italy.

== Biography ==
Born in Villaricca (Naples), he earned his high school diploma from the Vittorio Emanuele II Classical High School in Naples and a bachelor’s degree in business administration from the University of Naples Federico II.

In 2013, he joined the national leadership of the PD, becoming the youngest member; he was part of Giuseppe Civati faction within the party until he left in 2015.
