= Hikikomori =

Reclusive adolescents or adults

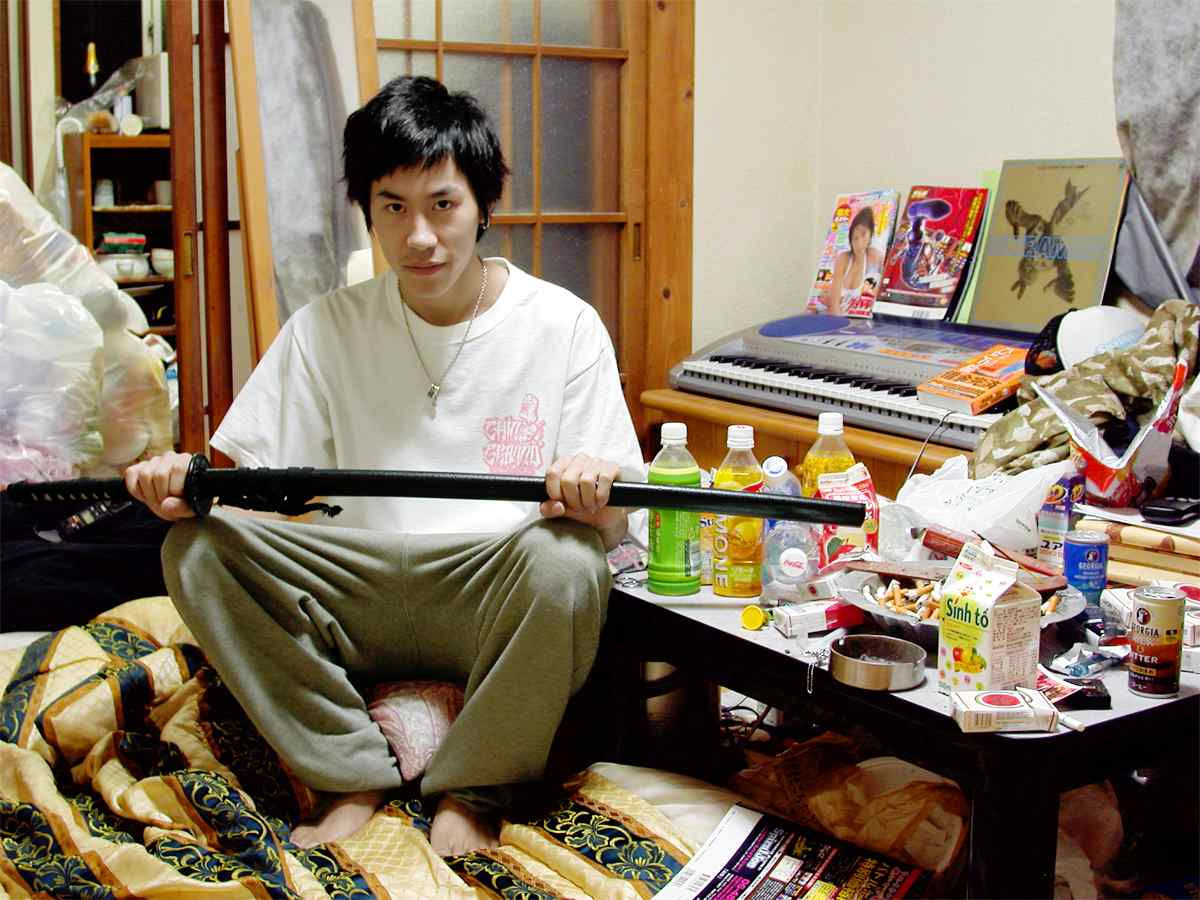
A young Japanese man living as a hikikomori in 2004

Hikikomori (Japanese: 引きこもり or ひきこもり [çi̥kʲikomoɾʲi], lit. 'pulling inward, being confined') are reclusive adolescents or adults who withdraw from social life, often seeking extreme degrees of isolation and confinement. The term refers to both the sociological phenomenon in general and the individuals belonging to this societal group, who have been described as "modern hermits". Hikikomori has been an increasing problem in Japan since the 1990s, with estimates suggesting that over a million individuals are affected. While the phenomenon is most associated with Japan, cases with similar conditions have also been reported in other parts of the world.

The key characteristics of hikikomori include a marked avoidance of social situations and interaction, a retreat into one's home (often a single room) for at least six months, and significant functional impairment or distress. While not a formal psychiatric diagnosis in itself, hikikomori can co-occur with various mental health conditions such as depression, anxiety disorders, or developmental disorders. The etiology is complex and multifaceted, involving individual psychological vulnerabilities (such as a history of bullying or academic failure, and personality traits like introversion or high sensitivity to shame), familial dynamics (including parent-child relationships and communication issues), and broader societal pressures related to education, employment, and social expectations in contemporary societies.

The understanding and societal response to hikikomori have evolved, with various support systems and treatment approaches being explored. The issue raises significant concerns regarding individual well-being, family burden, and the social integration of a considerable segment of the population.

== Etymology and definition ==
The Japanese term hikikomori (引きこもり or ひきこもり) is composed of the verbs hiku (引く, "to pull, draw, retreat") and komoru (籠る, "to shut oneself up, stay inside"). It describes both the condition of severe social withdrawal and the individuals who experience it. Psychiatrist Tamaki Saitō, who extensively researched and popularized the term with his 1998 book Shakaiteki Hikikomori: Owaranai Shishunki (Social Hikikomori: Adolescence without End), provided an early influential definition:

a state that has become a problem by the late twenties, that involves cooping oneself up in one's own home and not participating in society for six months or longer, but that does not seem to have another psychological problem as its principal source.

Saitō's initial definition emphasized hikikomori as a primary form of social withdrawal, distinct from other mental illnesses, although he later acknowledged that psychiatric treatment might be necessary. The Japanese Ministry of Health, Labour and Welfare (MHLW) in its 2003 guideline (updated in 2010) described hikikomori as a "psycho-sociological phenomenon" rather than a single disease entity, characterized by withdrawal from social participation (school, work, interactions outside home) and staying at home for more than six months, typically affecting individuals under 30. The MHLW guidelines also noted that while hikikomori is principally a non-psychotic phenomenon, it may co-occur with conditions like schizophrenia.

A more recent consensus among psychiatrists, as summarized by Kato, Kanba & Teo (2020), defines hikikomori as:

a form of pathological social withdrawal or social isolation whose essential feature is physical isolation in one's home. The person must meet the following criteria: a) marked social isolation in one's home; b) duration of continuous social isolation of at least 6 months; c) significant functional impairment or distress associated with the social isolation.

This definition explicitly recognizes that hikikomori can co-occur with other mental disorders, differing from Saitō's earlier emphasis on it as a primary condition. The term is used to describe both the phenomenon and the individuals affected by it.

== Characteristics ==
The primary characteristic of hikikomori is a state of severe social withdrawal where individuals confine themselves to their homes, often to a single room, for extended periods, typically six months or longer. This isolation involves a marked avoidance of social participation, such as attending school or work, and a reluctance to engage in social interactions even with family members.

Common behavioral patterns include a reversal of sleep-wake cycles (sleeping during the day and being active at night), excessive time spent on solitary activities like using the internet, playing video games, or watching television, and sometimes neglecting personal hygiene. While some may occasionally leave home for specific purposes, such as visiting a convenience store, their overall social engagement remains extremely limited. Some hikikomori individuals may also exhibit aggressive or violent behavior within the household, though this is not a universal characteristic.

Psychologically, individuals in hikikomori often experience significant distress. This can manifest as feelings of shame, inadequacy, anxiety, depression, and a profound sense of apathy or loss of motivation. Fear of others (anthropophobia) and obsessive-compulsive tendencies can also accompany the withdrawal. Saitō noted that many cases involve individuals who were initially perceived as "good" or introverted children who did not go through a typical rebellious phase. However, he also emphasized that there is not one fixed personality trait that manifests in every case. The experience often involves a loss of connection with the future, as described by Kazuki Ueyama: "The present was everything. I didn't have the ability to think about the future".

The phenomenon predominantly affects males, with Saitō reporting that 80% of the cases he dealt with were men. Government surveys also indicate a higher prevalence in males; for example, the 2016 Cabinet Office survey found 63.3% of hikikomori aged 15–39 were men, and the 2019 survey for those aged 40–64 found 76.6% were men. While often associated with adolescents and young adults, with onset typically occurring in the mid-teens to late twenties, hikikomori can persist for many years, leading to an aging population of individuals in withdrawal, sometimes referred to as the "80-50 problem" (parents in their 80s caring for hikikomori children in their 50s).

== Prevalence ==
Estimating the exact number of hikikomori in Japan is challenging due to the hidden nature of the condition and the shame often associated with it. Psychiatrist Tamaki Saitō, in his 1998 book, suggested that there could be "hundreds of thousands of people" living in this state, a figure that was significantly higher than previous estimates and sparked wider public and media attention. He later posited the number could be around or even over one million.

Japanese government surveys have provided varying estimates for different age groups.

- A 2010 Cabinet Office survey estimated 696,000 hikikomori aged 15 to 39.
- A 2016 Cabinet Office survey reported an estimated 541,000 individuals in the same 15–39 age group. The apparent decrease was considered potentially misleading as it did not account for the aging of the hikikomori population beyond this surveyed age range. This survey found that 34.7% of these hikikomori had been in withdrawal for more than seven years, a significant increase from 16.9% in the 2010 survey.
- A 2019 Cabinet Office survey focusing on the 40–64 age group estimated 613,000 hikikomori individuals. This survey highlighted the issue of prolonged withdrawal and the "80-50 problem" (parents in their 80s caring for hikikomori children in their 50s).

Combining these figures, media reports in 2019 suggested that over one million people in Japan were living as hikikomori. These surveys often define hikikomori as staying at home for six months or more and not participating in school, work, or social interactions outside the family. However, the majority of those identified as hikikomori in these surveys do leave their homes occasionally (e.g., for hobbies or to go to a convenience store), with only a small percentage (e.g., 4.2% of the 40–64 age group in the 2019 survey) never leaving their rooms. The stigma associated with hikikomori and the methodological challenges of surveying a reclusive population mean that official figures may still underestimate the true prevalence of the condition. Saitō himself maintained that the total figure was likely between one million and 1.5 million, even after the 2010 government survey.

== Contributing factors ==
The development of hikikomori is understood to be a result of a complex interplay of societal, familial, and individual factors, rather than a single cause.

=== Societal factors ===
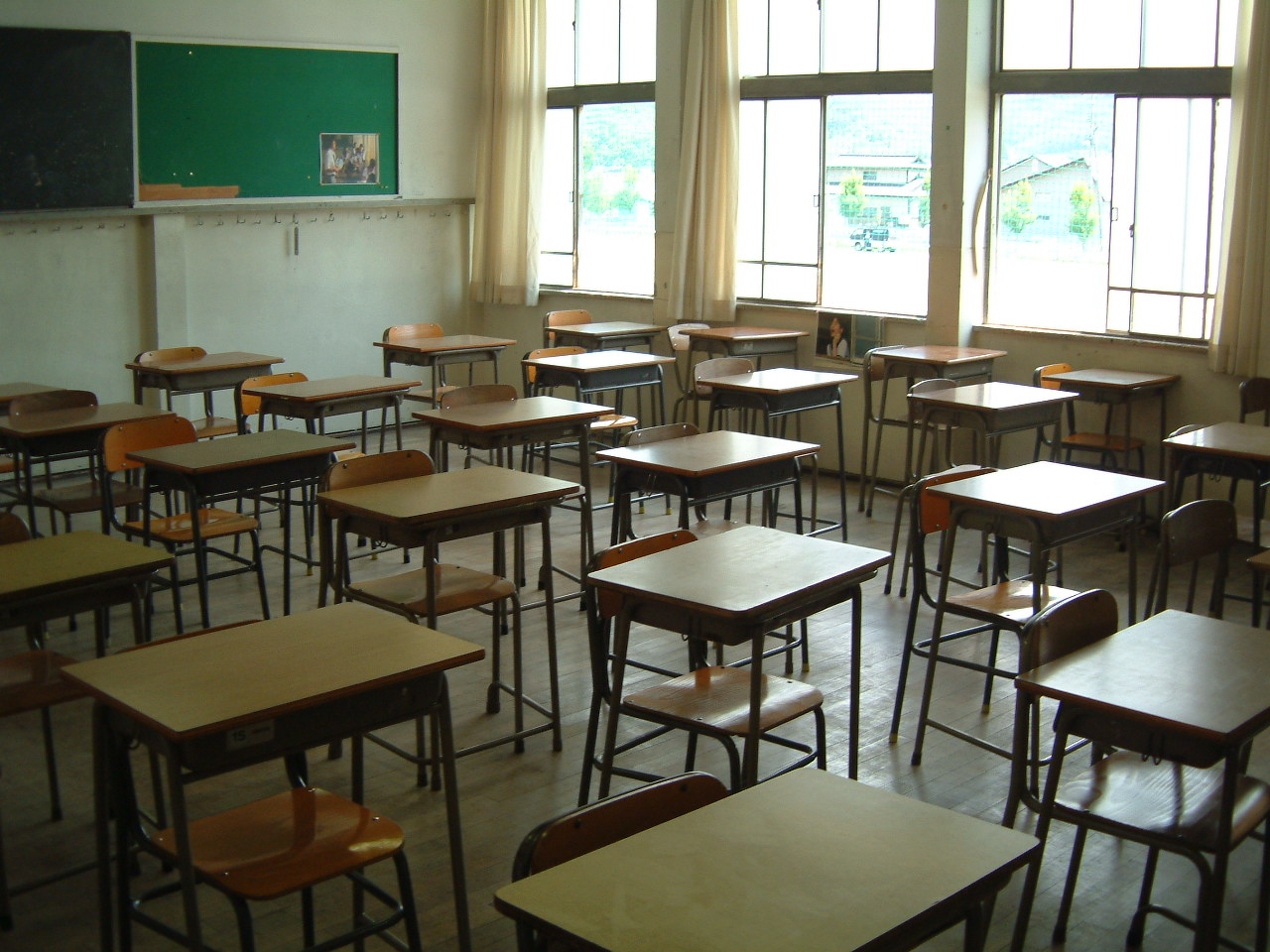
Japanese high school classroom. Rigid education is often cited as a contributing factor to hikikomori.

Several aspects of modern Japanese society are considered to contribute to the phenomenon. The highly competitive and rigid Japanese educational system is often cited as a major stressor. Tamaki Saitō argues that the system fosters an illusion of infinite possibilities while simultaneously imposing uniform evaluation standards. This can lead to intense pressure, bullying, and a fear of failure, making it difficult for some individuals to develop a stable sense of self or find their place. School non-attendance (futōkō) is often a precursor to or an early stage of hikikomori.

Changes in the labor market since the economic stagnation of the 1990s, including the decline of the traditional lifetime employment model, have made it harder for young people to secure stable, full-time jobs. The rise of precarious work (freeter) and individuals Not in Education, Employment, or Training (NEETs) reflects these difficulties. The pressure to succeed in a narrow definition of a "normal" life path (education followed by stable employment and marriage) can be overwhelming for those who deviate or struggle to meet these societal expectations.

Furthermore, the Japanese welfare system traditionally relied heavily on corporations (corporate welfare) and families to provide life security, with a less developed public social safety net for working-age individuals compared to some Western countries. As corporate welfare has shrunk, the burden on families to support non-working adult children has increased. This "familialistic welfare regime" can trap individuals in a state of dependency within the home, especially when public support systems are insufficient or carry a strong stigma.

=== Familial factors ===
Family dynamics play a significant role in the development and maintenance of hikikomori. Saitō described a common pattern of an overly close or codependent mother-child relationship and an emotionally or physically absent father. In such families, the child may struggle to achieve psychological separation and independence. This over-reliance on the maternal figure, often termed amae (a desire for indulgent dependency), can hinder maturation.

Communication problems within the family, including a lack of open dialogue or an inability to address conflicts constructively, can exacerbate the isolation. The family, often out of shame or a sense of responsibility, may inadvertently enable the withdrawal by providing for the individual's needs without encouraging social reintegration, creating what Saitō termed the "hikikomori system". This system involves a breakdown of communication and a state where the individual, family, and society lose functional contact with one another.

=== Individual factors ===
Individual psychological vulnerabilities can also predispose a person to hikikomori. These may include a history of bullying, academic or social failures, difficulties in interpersonal relationships, or pre-existing mental health conditions such as depression, anxiety disorders, or developmental disabilities like autism spectrum disorder, although hikikomori itself is not solely defined by these conditions.

Personality traits such as introversion, high sensitivity, perfectionism, or a strong fear of shame and failure can make individuals more susceptible to social withdrawal in the face of perceived social pressures or setbacks. Saitō's concept of "adolescence without end" suggests that some individuals in hikikomori are stuck in a prolonged adolescent state, unable to transition to adult roles and responsibilities. The experience of shame (haji) and social stigma associated with not conforming to societal expectations often becomes a powerful force maintaining the withdrawal. Individuals may feel a profound loss of self-worth and develop a deep-seated fear of judgment from others.

== Social and familial impact ==
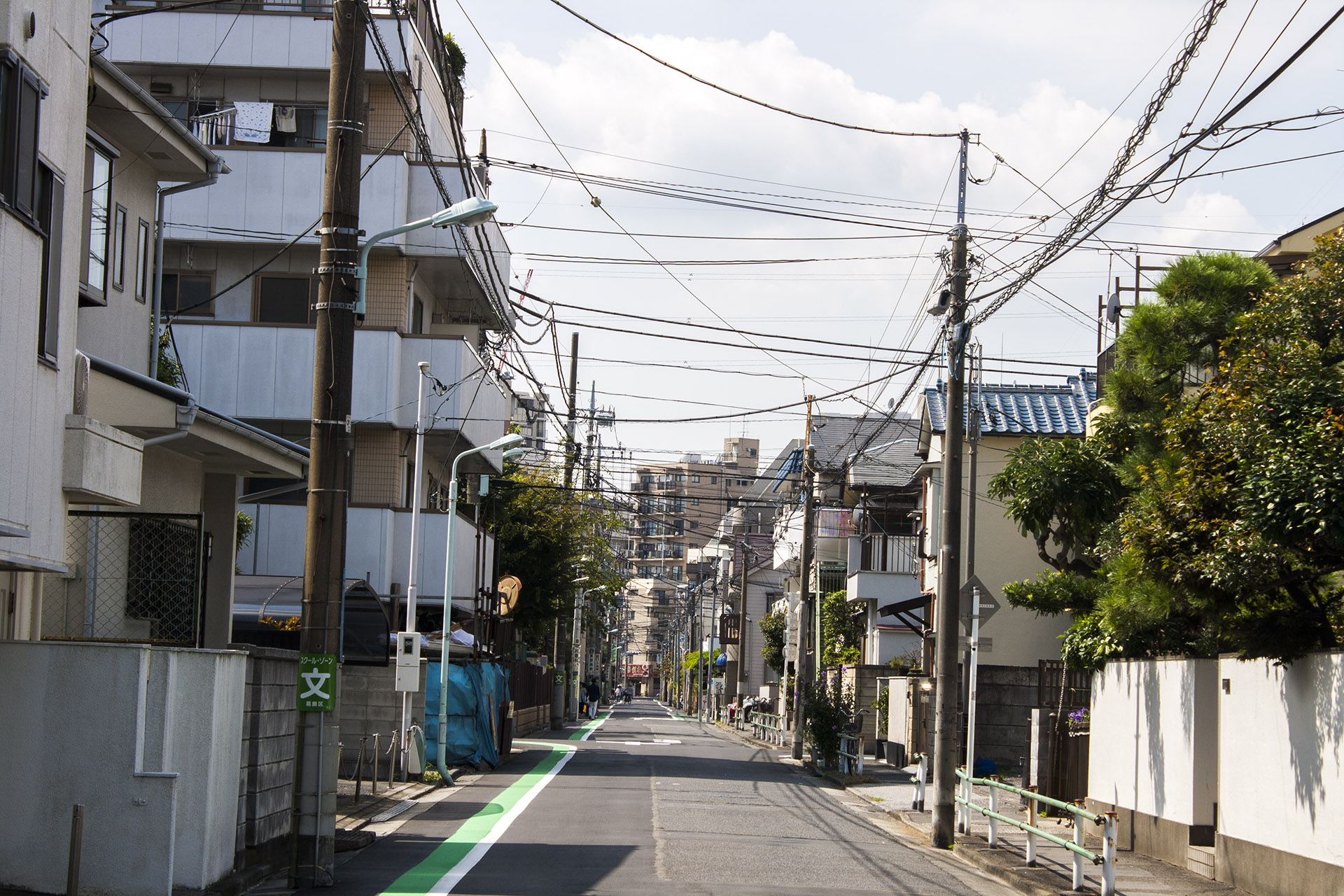
A residential street in Tokyo

The phenomenon of hikikomori has profound impacts on the individuals experiencing it, their families, and society at large.

For the individuals, hikikomori often leads to what Tamaki Saitō termed an "adolescence without end", a state of prolonged dependency and arrested development. They may experience a deterioration of social skills, increased anxiety about social interaction, and a deepening sense of isolation and hopelessness. The prolonged withdrawal can exacerbate or lead to mental health issues such as depression or anxiety disorders, although the relationship between hikikomori and pre-existing psychiatric conditions is complex and not always causal. Individuals often suffer from a strong sense of shame, self-blame, and a feeling of being a burden to their families. The experience of time can become distorted, with a focus on an oppressive present and an inability to envision a future.

For families, hikikomori creates significant emotional and financial strain. Parents often feel a mixture of guilt, anxiety, frustration, and helplessness. Communication within the family frequently breaks down, leading to a "hikikomori system" where interactions become minimal or dysfunctional, reinforcing the withdrawal. Domestic violence, either from the hikikomori individual towards parents or vice versa, can occur in some cases. The aging of parents and their hikikomori children has led to the "8050 problem" (parents in their 80s caring for hikikomori children in their 50s), raising severe concerns about long-term care and financial support after the parents are no longer able to provide it. Families often face social stigma and may try to hide the situation from relatives and the community.

From a societal perspective, hikikomori represents a loss of human potential and a challenge to social integration. The economic impact includes the loss of productive members of the workforce and potential long-term costs associated with welfare and healthcare. The phenomenon has also prompted public discourse and policy debates in Japan regarding youth issues, mental health, and the adequacy of social support systems.

Based on prior outbreaks (e.g. SARS and MERS), studies have shown that due to increased loneliness, quarantined individuals during COVID-19 have heightened stress-related mental disturbances. Considering that political, social, or economical challenges already bring people to express hikikomori-like behavior, researchers theorize that since all the aforementioned factors are by-products of a pandemic, a hikikomori phenomenon may become more common in a post-pandemic world. In fact, people who do experience mental disturbances in Japan generally view seeking the help of a psychiatrist as shameful or a reason for them to be socially shunned. Experts predict an increase in focus on issues such as the mental health problems now affecting youth, and specifically through effective telemedicine services to either the affected individual or their respective family unit. Furthermore, with hikikomori becoming more prevalent amid a pandemic, experts theorize that it will bring out more empathy and constructive attention towards the issue.

== Support and treatment ==
Addressing hikikomori involves a range of approaches, from psychiatric and psychological interventions to social support and family counseling. There is no single universally effective treatment, and strategies often need to be tailored to the individual's and family's specific circumstances.

Psychiatrist Tamaki Saitō, a pioneer in the field, emphasized the importance of professional intervention, especially for chronic cases. He viewed hikikomori not primarily as a mental illness to be cured by medication, but as a "pathological system" involving the individual, family, and society that needed to be untangled. Key elements of his approach include:

- Family counseling: Saitō stressed the crucial role of parents in the recovery process. Initial consultations often involve only the parents, aiming to change family dynamics, improve communication, and reduce behaviors that enable withdrawal. The goal is to break the "hikikomori system" by restoring functional communication between the individual and the family, and then between the family and society.
- Gradual reintegration: The aim is to slowly re-engage the individual with the outside world. This may start with small steps like leaving their room, interacting with family members, and eventually venturing outside the home for short periods.
- Avoiding coercion: Saitō cautioned against forceful methods, emphasizing that treatment should not be coercive, though parents have the right to guide their child towards help.
- Understanding, not blaming: Families are encouraged to understand that hikikomori is not simply "laziness" and to avoid confrontational "well-reasoned arguments" that can further alienate the individual.

Support beyond psychiatric clinics has become increasingly important.

- Non-profit organizations (NPOs): Various NPOs and support groups have emerged in Japan to assist hikikomori individuals and their families. These organizations offer a range of services, including shared living spaces, group activities, counseling, and vocational support. Examples include the KHJ National Federation of Families with Hikikomori, which advocates for families and supports research, and organizations like Newstart that provide residential programs.
- Community youth support centers: The Japanese government has established these centers to provide consultation and support for hikikomori and NEET individuals, often focusing on employment.
- Self-help groups: These groups provide a space for hikikomori individuals and their parents to share experiences and offer mutual support.

Challenges in providing support include the resistance of many hikikomori individuals to seek help, the stigma associated with the condition, and the difficulty in finding appropriate and accessible services. The debate continues on whether hikikomori should be primarily viewed as a medical/psychiatric issue requiring clinical treatment or a psychosocial phenomenon needing broader social and community-based interventions. Many approaches now recognize the need for multifaceted support that addresses individual psychological needs, family dynamics, and social reintegration.

== Global perspectives ==
While hikikomori was first identified and extensively studied in Japan, the phenomenon of severe social withdrawal among adolescents and young adults is not unique to the country. Increasing research and media reports have identified hikikomori-like cases in various parts of the world, including other East Asian countries like South Korea, as well as in Europe (e.g., France, Italy, Spain), North America, and Australia. Foreign associations focused on rising awareness on the topic and help hikikomori in their own nations exist outside of Japan, an example being Hikikomori Italia in Italy.

Tamaki Saitō, in his 2013 English edition, included a chapter on international comparisons, noting that while similar cases existed, cultural factors shaped their manifestation and societal response. For example, he observed that in some Western societies, prolonged withdrawal might lead to homelessness rather than confinement within the family home, due to different family structures and welfare systems. However, back on 12 April 2008, during an interview by Italian interviewer Claudia Pierdominici, he explicitly mentioned the presence of hikikomori in Italy, specifically in Sicily.

Nicolas Tajan's 2021 work, Mental Health and Social Withdrawal in Contemporary Japan: Beyond the Hikikomori Spectrum, extensively explores the globalization of social isolation. He argues that hikikomori, while deeply embedded in the Japanese sociocultural context (such as its education system, family structures, and labor market pressures), also reflects broader trends in modern, often neoliberal, societies. His research includes case studies of hikikomori in France, highlighting both similarities and differences in how the condition presents and is understood. For instance, the trigger for withdrawal in Japan might more often be related to avoiding failure in a highly structured system, while in France, it might follow a more concrete "problem" or failure in affective or social domains.

The debate over whether hikikomori is a "culture-bound syndrome" specific to Japan continues. While the DSM-5 does not include hikikomori as a distinct diagnostic category or a culture-bound syndrome, the increasing international reports suggest it may be a more universal human response to certain psychological, familial, and societal pressures, albeit one whose expression is significantly shaped by local cultural contexts. Factors like high academic pressure, employment insecurity, difficulties in social transitioning to adulthood, and the impact of technology on social interaction are common across many industrialized nations. However, the specific family dynamics, societal expectations around work and social participation, and the availability and nature of support systems differ, influencing how hikikomori manifests and is addressed globally.

== In popular culture ==
The phenomenon of hikikomori has been a subject of interest and depiction in various forms of popular culture, both within Japan and internationally, reflecting and sometimes shaping public understanding of the issue.

In literature, Tamaki Saitō's foundational 1998 book, Hikikomori: Adolescence without End, played a significant role in bringing the term and the condition to widespread public and academic attention in Japan. Autobiographical accounts from individuals who have experienced hikikomori, such as Kazuki Ueyama's From Me, Who Was a "Hikikomori" (2001) and Minoru Katsuyama's Hikikomori Calendar (2001), have provided first-person perspectives on the experience. The novel Ikebukuro West Gate Park (1997) by Ira Ishida featured a hikikomori character and was adapted into a popular TV drama, manga, and anime, further disseminating the image of hikikomori. Another example is the 2002 novel Welcome to the N.H.K. by Tatsuhiko Takimoto, which inspired a popular manga and anime of the same title.

In film and television, hikikomori has been explored through documentaries and fictional narratives. The 2008 omnibus film Tokyo! included a segment titled "Shaking Tokyo", directed by Bong Joon-ho, which portrays a hikikomori man whose life is disrupted by an earthquake and an encounter with a pizza delivery girl. Various television documentaries in Japan and internationally (e.g., by the BBC) have covered the topic, often focusing on the personal stories of hikikomori individuals and their families, and the efforts of support organizations. The 2020 video game Omori, developed by Omocat, is another notable example of hikikomori in media.

These cultural depictions can influence public perception. While they can raise awareness and empathy, they may also contribute to certain stereotypes, such as the image of the hikikomori as exclusively male, young, and addicted to the internet or video games, even though research indicates a more diverse reality.

== See also ==
- Agoraphobia
- Anomie
- Asociality
- Avoidant personality disorder
- Avolition
- Herbivore men
- Incel
- Jōhatsu (disappearance)
- Karoshi (death by overwork)
- Taijin kyofusho (social phobia)
- Tang ping (lying flat)
