= Iolanda Di Stasio =

Italian politician (born 1992)

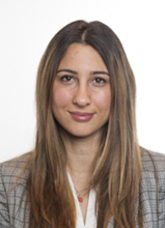
- Iolanda Di Stasio in 2018

Member of the Chamber of Deputies
- In office 23 March 2018 – 12 October 2022
- Constituency: Campania 1

Personal details
- Born: 24 February 1992 (age 34) Naples, Italy
- Party: Together for the Future (since 2022)
- Other political affiliations: Five Star Movement (until 2022)

Iolanda Di Stasio (born 24 February 1992) is an Italian politician. She was a member of the Chamber of Deputies, elected with the Five Star Movement in the 2018 Italian general election. In 2022, following Luigi Di Maio's split, she joined Together for the Future.

== Biography ==
Born in Naples, she grew up and was educated in Afragola, a municipality in the metropolitan city of Naples, where she graduated from the Brunelleschi state scientific high school, with a focus on science and language. Immediately after graduation, she enrolled in the Faculty of Law at the University of Naples Federico II without completing her studies.

She is married to Pierfrancesco Dettori, one of the major collaborators of Luigi Di Maio.

== Political career ==
=== Activist ===
At a very young age, she approached the 5 Star Movement in 2012, participating in the activities of the Afragola Meetup.

In 2017, she denounced possible connections between organized crime and the tenders for the construction of the Afragola high-speed line station. As an activist first and then as a spokesperson, she dealt with issues related to the Campania region, such as organized crime and the Land of Fires (Terra dei fuochi).

=== Parliamentarian ===
In the 2018 Italian general election she ran for the Italian Parliament in the Campania 1 constituency and was elected to the Chamber of Deputies.

Since 21 June 2018, she was a member of the Foreign Affairs Committee for the Chamber of Deputies and of the Justice Commission, replacing the Undersecretary of State for Justice Vittorio Ferraresi.

In January 2019 she was elected president of the Permanent Committee on Human Rights in the Chamber.

In February 2019 she was appointed President of the UIP (Inter-Parliamentary Union) "Italy - Dominican Republic and Haiti". On 20 December 2019 she presented as the first signatory a bill aimed at the concrete definition of Italy's exclusive economic zone in the Mediterranean Sea, an initiative considered functional to align Italy in the race to define rights in extra-territorial waters already started by countries such as Greece and Algeria.

On 21 June 2022, Luigi Di Maio split from the Five Star Movement, following the disagreements between him and the president of the M5S Giuseppe Conte. Di Stasio joined Insieme per il futuro (Ipf), becoming its group leader in the Chamber two days later.

In the early political elections of 25 September 2022, she was nominated for re-election to the Chamber for the electoral list of Ipf (Impegno Civico - Centro Democratico), as head of the list in the multi-member constituency Campania 1, but she was not elected.

== See also ==
- List of members of the Chamber of Deputies of Italy, 2018–2022
- 2018 Italian general election
- Legislature XVIII of Italy
- Movimento 5 Stelle
- Insieme per il futuro
