= Carmen Di Lauro =

Italian politician (born 1988)

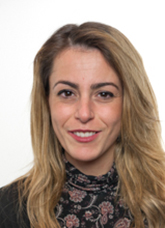
- Di Lauro in 2018

Member of the Chamber of Deputies
- Incumbent
- Assumed office 23 March 2018
- Constituency: Campania 1 – P03 (2018–2022); Campania 1 – U06 (2022–present)

Personal details
- Born: 24 March 1988 (age 38)
- Party: Five Star Movement

Carmen Di Lauro (born 24 March 1988) is an Italian politician serving as a member of the Chamber of Deputies since 2018. She has served as secretary of the committee on childhood and adolescence since 2023.
