= Dario Carotenuto =

Italian politician (born 1978)

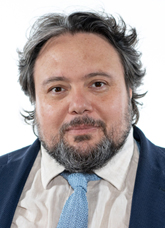
- Carotenuto in 2024

Member of the Chamber of Deputies
- Incumbent
- Assumed office 13 October 2022
- Constituency: Campania 1 – U03

Personal details
- Born: 11 February 1978 (age 48)
- Party: Five Star Movement

Dario Carotenuto (born 11 February 1978) is an Italian politician serving as a member of the Chamber of Deputies since 2022. From 2022 to 2024, he served as secretary of the committee on public and private sector employment.
