= Alessandro Caramiello =

Italian politician (born 1977)

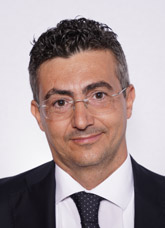
- Caramiello in 2022

Member of the Chamber of Deputies
- Incumbent
- Assumed office 13 October 2022
- Constituency: Campania 1 – P02

Personal details
- Born: 7 July 1977 (age 48)
- Party: Five Star Movement

Alessandro Caramiello (born 7 July 1977) is an Italian politician serving as a member of the Chamber of Deputies since 2022. From 2017 to 2022, he was a municipal councillor of Portici.
