= Francesco Emilio Borrelli =

Italian politician (born 1973)

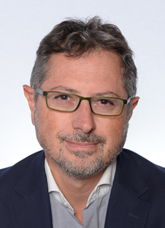
- Borrelli in 2022

Member of the Chamber of Deputies
- Incumbent
- Assumed office 13 October 2022
- Constituency: Campania 1 – P02

Personal details
- Born: 14 August 1973 (age 52)
- Party: Green Europe (since 2021)

Francesco Emilio Borrelli (born 14 August 1973) is an Italian politician serving as a member of the Chamber of Deputies since 2022. From 2015 to 2022, he was a member of the Regional Council of Campania.
