= Marianna Ricciardi =

Italian politician (born 1994)

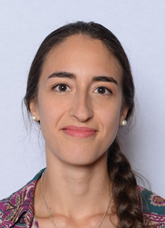
- Ricciardi in 2022

Member of the Chamber of Deputies
- Incumbent
- Assumed office 13 October 2022
- Constituency: Campania 1 – 01

Personal details
- Born: 13 January 1994 (age 32)
- Party: Five Star Movement

Marianna Ricciardi (born 13 January 1994) is an Italian politician serving as a member of the Chamber of Deputies since 2022. She previously worked as a physician.
