= Gilda Sportiello =

Italian politician (born 1987)

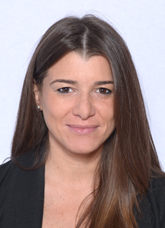
- Sportiello in 2022

Member of the Chamber of Deputies
- Incumbent
- Assumed office 23 March 2018
- Constituency: Campania 1 – P02 (2018–2022); Campania 1 – P01 (2022–present)

Personal details
- Born: 19 February 1987 (age 39)
- Party: Five Star Movement

Gilda Sportiello (born 19 February 1987) is an Italian politician serving as a member of the Chamber of Deputies since 2018. She has served as secretary of the Chamber since 2022.
