= Marco Costa =

Italian footballer (born 1997)

Personal information
- Date of birth: 7 April 1997 (age 29)
- Place of birth: Vaprio d'Adda, Italy
- Height: 1.85 m (6 ft 1 in)
- Position: Centre back

Team information
- Current team: Borgosesia

Youth career
- 2012–2014: Monza

Senior career*
Years	Team	Apps	(Gls)
2014–2017	Monza	17	(0)
2015–2016	→ Giana Erminio (loan)	2	(0)
2017–2019	Caronnese	64	(1)
2019–2020	Borgosesia	22	(0)
2020-	Ponte San Pietro	35	(0)
- * Club domestic league appearances and goals as of 21:11, 08 October 2021 (UTC)

Marco Costa (born 7 April 1997) is an Italian footballer who plays as a centre back for Borgosesia Calcio. He began his senior career with Monza in the 2014–15 Lega Pro season, and also played at that level in 2015–16 on loan at Giana Erminio.
