= Raffaele Bruno =

Italian politician (born 1974)

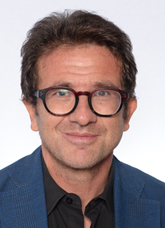
- Bruno in 2022

Member of the Chamber of Deputies
- Incumbent
- Assumed office 23 March 2018
- Constituency: Campania 1 – U07 (2018–2022); Campania 1 – P01 (2022–present)

Personal details
- Born: 3 May 1974 (age 52)
- Party: Five Star Movement

Raffaele Bruno (born 3 May 1974) is an Italian politician serving as a member of the Chamber of Deputies since 2018. He has served as secretary of the European Union affairs committee since 2025.
