= Pasqualino Penza =

Italian politician (born 1986)

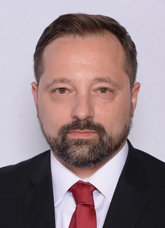
- Penza in 2022

Member of the Chamber of Deputies
- Incumbent
- Assumed office 13 October 2022
- Constituency: Campania 1 – U04

Personal details
- Born: 16 January 1986 (age 40)
- Party: Five Star Movement

Pasqualino Penza (born 16 January 1986) is an Italian politician serving as a member of the Chamber of Deputies since 2022. From 2020 to 2021, he was an assessor of Caivano.
