= Baby Pozzi =

Italian pornographic film actress (born 1963)

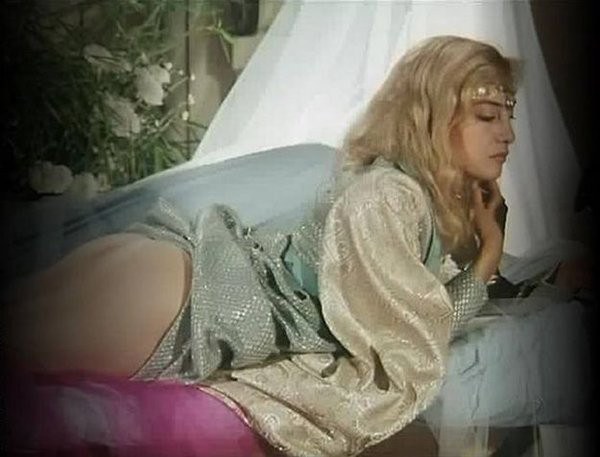
- Pozzi, c. 1990s
- Born: Maria Tamiko Pozzi; 1 June 1963 (age 63); Genoa, Italy
- Occupations: Actress, porn star
- Years active: 1988–95
- Relatives: Moana Pozzi (sister)

Maria Tamiko Pozzi (born 1 June 1963), best known by the stage name Baby Pozzi, is an Italian former pornographic film actress.

Born in Genoa, Liguria, she is the younger sister of the pornographic actress and television personality Moana Pozzi. She started her career with some shows in clubs, while attending school to become a chemical analyst. After entering Riccardo Schicchi's agency, "Diva Futura", as a secretary, she debuted in the adult industry in 1987 and retired in 1991. She then moved to France, where she volunteered in an orphanage. In 1995, after her sister's death through assisted suicide at the age of 33, she briefly rejoined the industry but only for some live shows. Outside of her adult career, she had a leading role in the erotic film Abat-Jour, which was directed by Lorenzo Onorati.

In 2009, a character based on her was played by Elena Bouryka in the miniseries Moana.
