= Moana Pozzi =

Italian pornographic film actress (1961–1994)

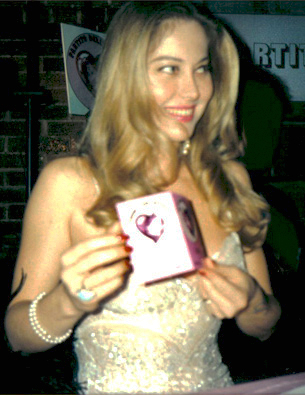
- Pozzi in 1992
- Born: Anna Moana Rosa Pozzi; 27 April 1961; Genoa, Italy
- Died: 15 September 1994 (aged 33); Lyon, France
- Other names: Moana, Linda Heveret, Margaux Jobert, Anna Maria Pozzi, Anna Moana Pozzi, Moanna, Moanna Pozzi
- Years active: 1986–1994
- Height: 1.78 m (5 ft 10 in)
- Political party: Love Party
- Children: 1
- Relatives: Baby Pozzi (sister)

Anna Moana Rosa Pozzi (Italian: [ˈanna moˈaːna ˈrɔːza ˈpottsi]; 27 April 1961 – 15 September 1994), also known mononymously as Moana, was an Italian pornographic film actress, television personality and politician.

== Early life ==
Pozzi was born in Genoa, Italy, the daughter of Alfredo Pozzi, a nuclear engineer, and Rosanna, a housewife. Her name, Moana, is a Polynesian name meaning "ocean". In her youth, Pozzi lived for periods of time in Canada and Brazil, due to the nature of her father's work requiring him to travel. By the time she was thirteen years old, the family had returned to their native Italy, where she finished school. In 1979, a few weeks before her 18th birthday, she gave birth to her only child, a son named Simone, who was raised by her parents and told that his mother was his older sister. The family moved to France in 1980 and Pozzi, then 19 years old, decided to stay in Rome.

In Rome, Pozzi started working as a model and studied acting. Sometimes she performed in television advertisements or as a walk-on in comedy movies. In 1981, she performed in her first hardcore movie, Valentina, ragazza in calore (Valentina, Girl in Heat), credited as Linda Heveret. A minor scandal ensued since, at the same time the movie was in theatres, she was still working on a children's television programme, Tip Tap Club, on Rete 2. She denied being the same person, but was suspended from television anyway. This gave Pozzi her first popularity in newspapers and magazines. In 1985, Federico Fellini wanted her to perform in his movie Ginger and Fred.

== Career ==
Pozzi performed in about 100 porn movies, mostly in Italy, but also some in Los Angeles with Gerard Damiano as director. She sold about 1 million videotapes. She was on the covers of 50 major magazines, not including pictorials in porn magazines. She was reportedly worth more than 50 billion lire (1990 prices), about 26 million euros. In 1993 she worked as a runway model for the designer Chiara Boni, walking the catwalk for that year's autumn/winter collection. Boni said, "Moana was something more than a pornstar, she went beyond very strong concepts." The following year she walked for Fendi.

== Death and aftermath ==
In 1994, Pozzi fell ill, unable to eat without vomiting, and losing weight. She took time off from work to travel with her husband Antonio Di Ciesco to India and then to France. She died in Lyon, France, on 15 September 1994, at the age of 33, reportedly of liver cancer. The cause of her death has been a subject of debate, with numerous suggestions being made, ranging from Pozzi being a spy for the KGB, killed by exposure to radioactive polonium, to dying from the result of assisted suicide orchestrated by her husband. In 2007, her husband, Di Ciesco, told a Rome newspaper he injected air into Moana's intravenous medicine drip after she sought his help to end her suffering. Some people have questioned whether or not Pozzi died, and believe she may have faked her death to escape fame.

In 2006, over a decade after her death, the Italian crime show Chi l'ha visto? aired her death certificate which showed she had indeed died of liver cancer, along with her cremation certificate, showing her ashes had been given to family members. Despite the release of paperwork and interviews with family members, the public and media has continued to speculate on how or if Pozzi died. Also in 2006, Simone Pozzi revealed to the public that he was her son, not her brother as he had been raised to believe. As told by him, he was born in 1979, just a few weeks before his mother's 18th birthday, and was told growing up that his grandparents were his parents and that his mother was his older sister, to avoid the scandal of an out-of-wedlock birth in the family. Pozzi's mother confirmed the claims. Later that year, he, along with investigative journalist Francesca Parravicini, published a book about Pozzi's personality, career and relationships.

== Legacy ==
Pozzi was a popular and beloved figure in Italy and made a name for herself outside of the pornography industry. Following her death, The New Yorker remarked on the country being in mourning as the result of her death and the Archbishop of Naples gave a homily in her honor. In fact, she considered herself Roman Catholic. During her lifetime, Pozzi supported LGBT rights, denounced the Mafia, and campaigned for legalization of sex work. Upon her death, she left much of her fortune to cancer research. Since she remains a well-known figure in Italy, it is believed that the Walt Disney Company made the decision to release the animated film Moana as Oceania in Italy and changed the title character's name to Vaiana for that localization.

Pozzi inspired the main character of the 1999 film Guardami (Look at Me). The 2009 miniseries Moana, based on her life, was directed by Alfredo Peyretti and starred Violante Placido in the title role. In 2010, her former manager Riccardo Schicchi produced and directed I segreti di Moana (The Secrets of Moana), in which the title role was played by Vittoria Risi. Pozzi was portrayed by Denise Capezza in the 2024 Italian film Diva Futura.

== Books ==
- Pozzi, Moana (1991). La filosofia di Moana (self-published) (in Italian). Rome: Moana's club. OCLC 1352509030.
- Pozzi, Moana (1992). Il sesso secondo Moana (self-published) (in Italian). Rome: Moana's club.

== Bibliography ==
- Bonetti, Noa (1994). Un'amica di nome Moana: confidenze a cuore aperto di un'indimenticabile star a luci rosse (in Italian). Milan: Sperling & Kupfer. ISBN 88-200-2061-0.
- D'Agostino, Patrizia; Tentori, Antonio; Teodorani, Alda (1995). Pornodive: storia delle amiche proibite degli italiani (in Italian). Preface by Ernestina Miscia. Rome: Castelvecchi. ISBN 88-8210-019-7.
- Di Quarto, Andrea; Giordano, Michele (1997). Moana e le altre: vent'anni di cinema porno in Italia (in Italian). Rome: Gremese. ISBN 88-7742-067-7.
- Fantauzzi, Brunetto (1995). La pornoViva: il terribile segreto di Moana (in Italian). Rome: Flash.
- Fantauzzi, Brunetto (2005). E... viva Moana: giallo politico! Chi ha ucciso la pornodiva del potere (in Italian). Rome: Pettirosso.
- Fantauzzi, Brunetto (2006). Moana: la spia nel letto del potere (in Italian). Rome: Edizioninuove. ICCU IT\ICCU\LO1\1263209.
- Fantauzzi, Brunetto (2009). Moana: amori e segreti (in Italian). Ariccia: First Class. ICCU IT\ICCU\TO0\1931165.
- Giusti, Marco (2004). Moana (in Italian). Milan: Mondadori. ISBN 88-04-53306-4.
- Krumm, Ermanno, ed. (2003). Mimmo Rotella: Moana ultimo mito Galleria Cà di Frà - Galleria Tega, 25 settembre 2003 (in Italian). Rome: Prearo. ISBN 88-7348-032-2.
- Pozzi, Simone (2005). La verità su mia sorella Moana Pozzi (in Italian). Turin: Seneca.
- Pozzi, Simone (2006). Parravicini, Francesca (ed.). Moana: tutta la verità (in Italian). Reggio Emilia: Aliberti. ISBN 88-7424-134-8.
