= La squadra =

- Genre: Police procedural; Crime drama
- Created by: Claudio Norza
- Starring: Massimo Bonetti; Renato Carpentieri; Mario Porfito; Giovanni Guidelli; Federico Tocci; Tony Sperandeo; Gea Lionello; Massimo Wertmüller; Chiara Salerno; Vincenzo Failla; Giovanni Rienzo; Alessia Barela; Ilaria D'Elia; Saba Anglana; Ana Valeria Dini; Anna Foglietta; Michela Andreozzi; Andrea Marrocco; Gaetano Amato; Cecilia Dazzi; Luca Venantini; Vanno Bramati; Flavio Albanese; Gennaro Silvestro; Ester Botta; Roberto Zibetti; Ines Nobili; Alexandra Filotei; Ferdinando Maddaloni
- Country of origin: Italy
- No. of seasons: 8
- No. of episodes: 221

Original release
- Release: March 3, 2000 – December 5, 2007

La squadra is an Italian police procedural television series.

== See also ==
- List of Italian television series
