= Alfredo Arciero =

Italian film director

- Born: 10 September 1968 (age 56); Caserta, Italy
- Occupation(s): Film director, screenwriter

Alfredo Arciero (born 10 September 1968) is an Italian film director and screenwriter.

== Filmography ==
=== Director ===
- Dio c'è (1988)
- Family Game (2007)
- Il viaggio (2017)

=== Screenwriter ===
- Dio c'è (1998)
- Teste di cocco (2000)
- Sei forte, maestro – TV series (2000-2001)
- Angelo il custode – TV series (2001)
- Promessa d'amore (2004)
- Don Matteo – TV series (2006, 2008)
- Family Game (2007)
- Intelligence - Servizi & segreti – TV series (2009)
- Sharm el Sheikh - Un'estate indimenticabile (2010)
- Il tredicesimo apostolo - Il prescelto – TV series (2012)
- Benvenuti a tavola - Nord vs Sud – TV series (2013)
- Squadra antimafia - Palermo oggi – TV series (2014)
- Il viaggio (2017)
