= Antonio Caso (politician) =

Italian politician (born 1984)

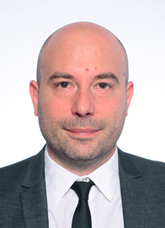
- Caso in 2022

Member of the Chamber of Deputies
- Incumbent
- Assumed office 13 October 2022
- Constituency: Campania 1 – U01

Personal details
- Born: 5 February 1984 (age 42)
- Party: Five Star Movement

Antonio Caso (born 5 February 1984) is an Italian politician serving as a member of the Chamber of Deputies since 2022. From 2017 to 2022, he was a municipal councillor of Pozzuoli.
