= Annarita Patriarca =

Italian politician (born 1971)

Member of the Chamber of Deputies
- Incumbent
- Assumed office 13 October 2022
- Constituency: Campania 1 – P02

Personal details
- Born: 27 July 1971 (age 54)
- Party: Forza Italia (since 2013)

Annarita Patriarca (born 27 July 1971) is an Italian politician serving as a member of the Chamber of Deputies since 2022. From 2020 to 2022, she was a member of the Regional Council of Campania. From 2009 to 2012, she served as mayor of Gragnano.
