= Il viaggio (2017 film) =

2017 Italian comedy-drama film

- Film poster
- Directed by: Alfredo Arciero
- Screenplay by: Alfredo Arciero; Alessio Billi
- Story by: Maurizio Santilli
- Starring: Maurizio Santilli; Danila Stalteri; Daniela Terreri; Marco Caldoro; Fabio Ferrari; Gaetano Amato
- Cinematography: Francesco Ciccone
- Edited by: Rinaldo Marisili
- Music by: Antonio Di Iorio
- Release date: April 6, 2017
- Running time: 96 minutes
- Country: Italy
- Language: Italian

Il viaggio (lit. 'The Journey') is a 2017 Italian comedy-drama film directed by Alfredo Arciero.

== Plot ==
The stories of five people, a politician, an actress, a university assistant, an oenologist and an entrepreneur, are intertwined aboard a train along the Sulmona-Carpinone railway, the so-called "Trans-Siberian of Italy", between Abruzzo and Molise. Influenced by the beauty of the landscapes and the encounters with unknown people who are on the same train, the journey becomes an opportunity for them to reflect on their life and on the importance of the values of love, friendship and solidarity.

== Cast ==
- Maurizio Santilli as Maurizio
- Danila Stalteri as Noemi
- Daniela Terreri as Daniela
- Marco Caldoro as Marco
- Fabio Ferrari as Fabio
- Gaetano Amato as Alfredo
- Lucianna De Falco as Serena
- Angelo Orlando as the friar
- Sergio Sivori as Professor Terzi
- Angela Pepi as Patrizia
- Barbara Petti as Paola
- Palma Spina as Palma
- Diego Florio as Aarif
