= Day of the Dead (disambiguation) =

Day of the Dead is a holiday celebrated in Mexico and elsewhere on October 28 through November 3.

Day of the Dead, Día de los Muertos, or Día de Muertos may also refer to:

== Film and television ==
=== Day of the Dead franchise ===
- Day of the Dead (1985 film), a horror film, the third installment in George A. Romero's Living Dead series
  - Day of the Dead 2: Contagium, a 2005 film that is an unofficial prequel to the 1985 film
  - Day of the Dead (2008 film), a 2008 remake of the 1985 film
  - Day of the Dead: Bloodline a 2018 remake of the 1985 film
  - Day of the Dead (soundtrack), a soundtrack album from the 1985 film
  - Day of the Dead (TV series), a 2021 television series based on the 1985 film

=== Films ===
- Día de muertos (film), a 1988 Mexican comedy-drama film
- Candyman 3: Day of the Dead, a 1999 American supernatural slasher film, the third installment of the Candyman series

=== Television episodes ===
- "Code Name: Day of the Dead", Acapulco H.E.A.T. season 2, episode 4 (1998)
- "Day of the Dead", Babylon 5 season 5, episode 8 (1998)
- "Day of the Dead", Carnivàle season 1, episode 11 (2003)
- "Day of the Dead", Land's End episode 6 (1995)
- "Day of the Dead", Lonesome Dove: The Series season 2, episode 10 (1995)
- "Day of the Dead", Murder, She Wrote season 8, episode 19 (1992)
- "Day of the Dead", Penny Dreadful: City of Angels episode 10 (2020)
- "Day of the Dead", The Brokenwood Mysteries series 10, episode 2 (2024)
- "Incident of the Day of the Dead", Rawhide season 2, episode 1 (1959)
- "The Day of the Dead", Atlantis series 2, episode 5 (2014)
- "The Day of the Dead", Billy the Kid season 2, episode 4 (2023)
- "The Day of the Dead", Let's Go Luna! season 1, episode 2b (2018)
- "The Day of the Dead Caper", Carmen Sandiego season 3, episode 2 (2020)
- "The Day of the Dead", Pocoyo series 4 special, episode 32 (2021)

== Literature ==
- Day of the Dead, a 2004 novel J. A. Jance
- Day of the Dead, a 2018 novel by Nicci French
- Days of the Dead, a 1992 novel by Ashley McConnell
- Days of the Dead, a 1997 novel by David Downing under the pseudonym David Monnery
- Days of the Dead, a 1994 picture book by Kathryn Lasky
- Days of the Dead, a 2003 Benjamin January mystery novel by Barbara Hambly
- The Day of the Dead, a 2004 novel by Eoin McNamee under the pseudonym John Creed
- The Day of the Dead, a 2004 novel by Tracey West, the sixth installment in the Scream Shop series
- The Day of the Dead: The Autumn of Commissioner Ricciardi, a 2010 Commissario Ricciardi novel by Maurizio De Giovanni

== Music ==
- Day of the Dead (2016 album), a Grateful Dead tribute album by Red Hot Organization
- Day of the Dead (Hollywood Undead album), 2015
  - "Day of the Dead" (song), the title song
- "Day of the Dead", a song by Sopor Aeternus and The Ensemble of Shadows, from the album La Chambre d'Echo
- Day of the Dead EP, a 2004 EP by Dog Fashion Disco
- Dia de los Muertos (band)
- The Day of the Dead (album), a 1978 album by Graham Collier

== Other ==
- The Day of the Dead, an 1859 painting by William-Adolphe Bouguereau

=== Television episodes with title plays ===
- "El Dia de los Muertos Estupidos", The Grim Adventures of Billy & Mandy season 6, episode 11a (2007)
- "Murder on the Day of the Dead", Death in Paradise series 7, episode 5 (2018)
- "Night of the Day of the Dead", Lizzie McGuire season 1, episode 24 (2001)

== See also ==
- All Souls' Day, a Catholic holiday
- Bon Festival, a Japanese Buddhist custom
- Festival of the Dead, held by many cultures throughout the world
- Ghost Festival, a traditional Buddhist and Taoist festival held in Asian countries
- Qingming Festival, a traditional Chinese festival
