= Pagliacci =

Opera by Ruggero Leoncavallo

- Opera by Ruggero Leoncavallo
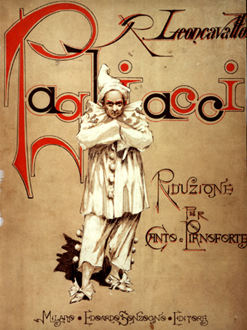
- Cover of first piano/vocal score, published in 1892
- Librettist: Ruggero Leoncavallo
- Language: Italian
- Premiere: 21 May 1892; Teatro Dal Verme, Milan

Pagliacci (Italian pronunciation: [paʎˈʎattʃi]; literal translation, 'Clowns') (Note: The title is sometimes incorrectly rendered in English with a definite article as I pagliacci. Pagliacci is the Italian plural for "clowns", and although i is the corresponding plural definite article, it is not used in the original title.) is an Italian opera in a prologue and two acts, with music and libretto by Ruggero Leoncavallo. The opera tells the tale of Canio, actor and leader of a commedia dell'arte theatrical company, who murders his wife Nedda and her lover Silvio on stage during a performance. Canio portrays on stage the character of Pagliaccio (Pierrot), while Nedda portays Pierrot's unfaithful lover Columbina.

Pagliacci premiered at the Teatro Dal Verme in Milan on 21 May 1892, conducted by Arturo Toscanini, with Adelina Stehle as Nedda, Fiorello Giraud as Canio, Victor Maurel as Tonio, and Mario Ancona as Silvio. Soon after its Italian premiere, the opera played in London (with Nellie Melba as Nedda) and in New York (on 15 June 1893, with Agostino Montegriffo as Canio). Pagliacci is the best-known of Leoncavallo's ten operas and remains a staple of the repertoire. Pagliacci is often staged with Cavalleria rusticana by Pietro Mascagni, a double bill known colloquially as "Cav/Pag".

== Origin and disputes ==
Leoncavallo was a little-known composer when Pietro Mascagni's Cavalleria rusticana premiered around 1890. After seeing Mascagni's success, Leoncavallo decided to write an opera in response: one act composed in the verismo style.

Leoncavallo claimed that he based the story of Pagliacci on an incident from his childhood: the 1865 murder of a Leoncavallo family servant, Gaetano Scavello, killed by Gaetano D'Alessandro, with his brother Luigi acting as accomplice. The incident stemmed from a series of perceived romantic entanglements involving Scavello, Luigi D'Alessandro, and a village girl with whom both men were infatuated. Leoncavallo's father, a judge, presided as magistrate over the criminal investigation.

Leoncavallo originally titled his story Il pagliaccio (The Clown). The baritone Victor Maurel, who was cast as the first Tonio, requested that Leoncavallo change the title from the singular Il pagliaccio to the plural Pagliacci (Clowns), to broaden dramatic interest from Canio alone to include Tonio (his own role).

The French author Catulle Mendès sued Leoncavallo for plagiarism after learning of the plot of Leoncavallo's libretto from an 1894 French translation. Mendès thought it resembled his 1887 play La Femme de Tabarin ("Tabarin's Wife"), which was structured as a play-within-the-play and featured a clown murdering his wife. Leoncavallo pleaded ignorance of Mendès's play. Later, there were counter-accusations that Mendès's play resembled Don Manuel Tamayo y Baus's Un Drama Nuevo (1867). Mendès dropped his lawsuit. Scholar Matteo Sansone has suggested that Leoncavallo had ample opportunity to be exposed to new French art and musical works while living in Paris from 1882 to 1888, including potentially Mendès's play, another version of La femme de Tabarin by Paul Ferrier, and Tabarin, an opera composed by Émile Pessard that was based on Ferrier's play.

== Composition ==
The opening Prologue was written for Maurel "as an afterthought", as Leoncavallo said in a conversation with the critic and singing teacher Herman Klein during his visit to London for the UK premiere in 1893: he wrote it "as an inducement to a clever, but rather egotistical baritone to sing the part of Tonio, who felt it wasn't important enough for an artist of his distinction. Perhaps he was right. Anyhow I thought the matter over and hit upon the idea that a prologue, sung before the curtain by one of the humblest characters, would prove something of a novelty and by no means out of place. Being, as you know, my own librettist, I quickly wrote the words and sketched the music. My baritone was delighted, both with the notion and the result, and I am bound to add that it proved one of the most striking features of the opera when I brought it out at the Dal Verme, Milan, just a year ago."

Towards the end of the prologue, singers often interpolate a high A♭ and a high G, although these do not appear in the original full score. In an Australian newspaper article in December 1893, the baritone Guigliemo Caruson, who had already sung the part in Genoa earlier that year said that "whilst rehearsing under Signor Leoncavallo's immediate direction, the composer gave his consent to the interpolation remarking that it was very effective, but that he would not add it to the score as he did not wish to force the note upon voices it did not suit." (Note: "Musical and Dramatic Notes". The Sydney Morning Herald. 2 December 1893. p. 4 – via Trove. NB: In this article, Caruson claims to have sung at the 'old' Metropolitan Opera under the impresarios Abbey, Schoeffel and Grau before performing in Guatemala. This seems to have been in 1889, see However, the trio of impresarios didn't return to the 'Met' until 1891, and he probably meant the Auditorium Theatre, Chicago.)

== Performance history ==
Pagliacci received mixed critical reviews after its world premiere, but was instantly successful with the public and has remained so ever since.

The UK premiere of Pagliacci took place at the Royal Opera House, Covent Garden, under the management of Sir Augustus Harris in London on 19 May 1893, supervised by the composer. Nellie Melba sang Nedda, with Fernando De Lucia as Canio and Mario Ancona as Tonio, M. Bonnard (Beppe) and Richard Green (Silvio). The conductor was Luigi Mancinelli.

The US premiere followed a month later at the Grand Opera House in New York City on 15 June 1893, conducted by Gustav Hinrichs, with Selma Kronold (Nedda), American tenor Agostino Montegriffo (Canio), and Giuseppe Campanari (Tonio).

The 'old' Metropolitan Opera House first staged the work on 11 December as a double-bill with Orfeo ed Euridice, with the same cast as the London premiere with Melba in the role of Nedda, De Lucia as Canio, and Ancona as Tonio. The Met again staged Pagliacci as a double-bill with the same cast and conductor, this time followed by Cavalleria rusticana on 22 December 1893 with Emma Calvé as Santuzza, conducted by Enrico Bevignani. The two operas have since been frequently performed in this double-bill, a pairing referred to in the operatic world colloquially as "Cav and Pag".

The Belgian premiere (in a French translation) took place on 14 February 1895 at the Theatre de la Monnaie, Brussels, with Cécile Simonnet as Nedda, conducted by Philippe Flon.

In 1902, the opera received its French premiere at the Paris Opera, with legendary tenor Jean de Reszke as Canio in what would be his last public performance, as he would later retire from the stage to focus on teaching and to spend more time with his family.

Pagliacci was produced alone in Washington National Opera's November 1997 production by Franco Zeffirelli. The re-organised New York City Opera presented Pagliacci in 2016 on a double bill with Rachmaninoff's Aleko.

== Roles ==
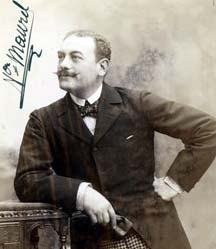
French baritone Victor Maurel, creator of the role of Tonio

Roles in the opera and in the commedia dell'arte, voice types, premiere cast
Role	Role in Commedia dell'arte	Voice type	Premiere cast, 21 May 1892 Conductor: Arturo Toscanini
Canio, head of the troupe	Pagliaccio (Pierrot), Colombina's husband	tenor	Fiorello Giraud
Nedda, Canio's wife, in love with Silvio	Colombina, Pagliaccio's wife, in love with Arlecchino	soprano	Adelina Stehle
Tonio, actor with physical deformity	Taddeo, Colombina's servant	baritone	Victor Maurel
Beppe (Peppe (Note: According to Konrad Dryden, the original spelling of the character's name was "Peppe" (Dryden 2007, p. 38).)), actor	Arlecchino, Colombina's lover	tenor	Francesco Daddi
Silvio, Nedda's lover		baritone	Mario Ancona
Chorus of villagers

== Synopsis ==
Place: Calabria, near Montalto, on the Feast of the Assumption
Time: between 1865 and 1870

=== Prologue ===
During the orchestral introduction, Tonio, dressed as his commedia dell'arte character Taddeo, pokes his head through the curtain, advances, and addresses the audience. ("Si può?... Si può?... Signore! Signori! ... Un nido di memorie"). He reminds the audience that actors have feelings too, and that the show is about real people. Tonio returns behind the curtain, which then rises for the main action.

=== Act 1 ===
At three o'clock in the afternoon, the commedia troupe enters the village to the cheering of the villagers. Canio describes the night's performance: the troubles of Pagliaccio. He says the play will begin at ventitré ore, an agricultural method of time-keeping that means the play will begin an hour before sunset. (Note: Literally "the twenty-third hour", but not 23:00 hours (11pm), as translated in some libretti. The term refers to when the hours were counted from one avemmaria della sera (evening angelus) to the next, and hence one hour before avemmaria or as in some libretti "at sundown". This Italian time was in use between the fourteenth and eighteenth centuries, but persisted in some isolated rural communities as here, till the mid nineteenth century (Swan 1892, "Time" p. 40). In other operas it appears in Rigoletto and Un ballo in maschera.) As Nedda steps down from the cart, Tonio offers his hand, but Canio pushes him aside and helps her down himself.

The villagers suggest drinking at the tavern. Canio and Beppe accept, but Tonio stays behind. The villagers tease Canio that Tonio is planning an affair with Nedda. Canio warns everyone that while he may act the foolish husband in the play, in real life he will not tolerate other men making advances to Nedda. Shocked, a villager asks if Canio really suspects her. He says no, and sweetly kisses her on the forehead. As the church bells ring vespers, he and Beppe leave for the tavern, leaving Nedda alone.

Nedda is frightened by Canio's vehemence ("Qual fiamma avea nel guardo"), but the birdsong comforts her ("Stridono lassù"). Tonio returns and confesses his love for her, but she laughs. Enraged, Tonio grabs Nedda, but she takes a whip, strikes him and drives him off. Silvio, who is Nedda's lover, comes from the tavern, where he has left Canio and Beppe drinking. He asks Nedda to elope with him after the performance and, though she is afraid, she agrees. Tonio, who has been eavesdropping, leaves to inform Canio so that he might catch Silvio and Nedda together. Canio and Tonio return and, as Silvio escapes, Nedda calls after him, "I will always be yours!"

"Vesti la giubba"
Performed by Enrico Caruso, recorded on March 17, 1907

"No! Pagliaccio non son!"
Performed by Enrico Caruso

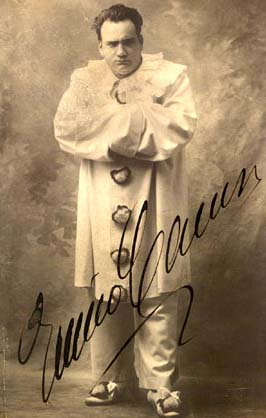
Enrico Caruso as Canio in Pagliacci, one of his signature roles

Canio chases Silvio, but does not catch him and does not see his face. He demands that Nedda tell him the name of her lover, but she refuses. He threatens her with a knife, but Beppe disarms him. Beppe insists that they prepare for the performance. Tonio tells Canio that her lover will give himself away at the play. A heartbroken Canio is left alone to put on his costume and prepare to laugh ("Vesti la giubba" – "Put on the costume").

=== Act 2 ===
As the crowd arrives, Nedda, costumed as Colombina, collects their money. She whispers a warning to Silvio, and the crowd cheers as the play begins.

Colombina's husband Pagliaccio has gone away until morning, and Taddeo is at the market. Alone, she anxiously awaits her lover Arlecchino, who comes to serenade her ("O Colombina") from beneath her window. Taddeo returns and confesses his love, but she mocks him. She lets Arlecchino in through the window. He boxes Taddeo's ears and kicks him out of the room, and the audience laughs.

Arlecchino and Colombina dine, and he gives her a sleeping potion to use later, "so that when Pagliaccio returns, she can drug him and elope with Arlecchino." Taddeo then bursts in, warning them that Pagliaccio is suspicious of his wife and is about to return. As Arlecchino escapes through the window, Colombina tells him, "I will always be yours!"

As Pagliaccio enters, he hears Colombina speak this line and, now as Canio, exclaims "Nome di Dio! Quelle stesse parole!" – "Name of God! Those same words!" He tries to continue the play, but loses control and demands to know her lover's name. Nedda, hoping to keep to the performance, calls Canio by his stage name "Pagliaccio" to remind him of the audience's presence. He answers with his arietta: "No! Pagliaccio non son!" – "I am not Pagliaccio!" He sings that if his face is pale, it is not from the stage makeup but from the shame she has brought him. The crowd is impressed by his emotional performance and cheers him, without realizing that it is real.

Nedda, trying to continue the play, admits that she has been visited by the innocent "Arlecchino". Canio, furious and forgetting the play, demands the name of her lover. Nedda swears she will never tell him, and it becomes apparent that they are not acting. Side-stage, Beppe asks Tonio to intervene, but Tonio refrains and prevents Beppe from halting the action. Silvio begins to fight his way toward the stage. Canio, grabbing a knife from the table, stabs Nedda. As she dies, she calls: "Help! Silvio!" Silvio attacks Canio, but Canio kills him as well. The horrified audience then hears the celebrated final line:

"La commedia è finita!" – "The comedy is finished!"

==== Assignment of the final line ====
In the original manuscript, Tonio sang the opera's final line, "La Commedia è finita!", paralleling the prologue, also sung by Tonio. The appropriation of this final line by Canio dates back to 1895. John Wright has analysed the dramaturgy of the opera in the context of assignment of the final line, and concluded that the original assignment of the final line to Tonio is the most consistent and appropriate assignment. Wright says that Tonio shows more deliberate control in his manipulation of the other characters to obtain his revenge upon Nedda, after she has rejected him, and is more aware of the demarcation between life and art. By contrast, Canio is unaware of the behind-the-scenes manipulations and surrenders control of his perception of the difference between life and art as the opera proceeds.

In the present day, the assignment of the final line to Canio has continued to be standard. Several exceptions, where Tonio delivers the final line, include:

- December 1959 production at the Royal Opera House, Covent Garden, directed by Franco Zeffirelli
- 1968 RAI-TV production directed by Herbert von Karajan
- 1982 television film directed by Franco Zeffirelli
- His Master's Voice recording conducted by Riccardo Muti (EMI CMS7 63650-2)
- Philips recording conducted by Muti (Philips 0289 434 1312), in conjunction with live performances in Philadelphia in February 1992
- 1998 English-language recording on Chandos (CHAN 3003) (Note: In the liner notes, the synopsis indicates Canio as stating the final line, inconsistent with the presentation of the libretto in the booklet. The English title given to the opera in this recording is 'The Touring Company'.)
- 2007 Teatro Real production directed by Giancarlo del Monaco, in which Tonio's prologue is inserted into the double-bill before the overture to Cavalleria rusticana, the finale of which segues directly into the first act of Pagliacci (Opus Arte OA0983D)
- 2008 Seattle Opera production
- 2010 Opera Grand Rapids production
- 2014 San Diego Opera production
- 2015 Metropolitan Opera production
- 2019 Maggio Musicale Fiorentino production
- 2024 Opera Holland Park production
- 2026 Teatro Colón production

== Orchestration ==
The orchestra consists of 2 flutes, 1 piccolo, 2 oboes, 1 cor anglais, 2 clarinets, 1 bass clarinet, 3 bassoons, 4 horns, 3 trumpets, 3 trombones, 1 tuba, 2 harps, timpani, tubular bells, percussion (triangle, cymbals, bass drum, glockenspiel, and tam-tam) and strings. Additionally, there is an onstage violin, oboe, trumpet, and bass drum.

== Recordings and other media ==
1907 recording of Pagliacci

In 1907, Pagliacci was the first opera to be recorded in its entirety, with the Puerto Rican tenor Antonio Paoli as Canio and under Leoncavallo's personal supervision. In 1931, it became the first complete opera to be filmed with sound, in a now-obscure version starring the tenor Fernando Bertini as Canio, in his only film, with the San Carlo Opera Company. Franco Zeffirelli directed his 1981 La Scala production with Plácido Domingo and Teresa Stratas for a 1982 television airing, which has since been released on DVD. The movie's soundtrack received a Grammy nomination for Best Opera Recording. Pagliacci was also recorded in English in 1997, and released commercially in 1998, for the Chandos "Opera in English" label with Dennis O'Neill as Canio, Alan Opie as Tonio, and Rosa Mannion as Nedda.

In 1991, Kent State University student Michael Mould began translating Pagliacci into English for a comics adaptation, but died on USAir Flight 405 before he could complete it. Marc Andreyko finished Mould's translation as The Clowns, a one-shot written by P. Craig Russell and illustrated by Galen Showman. Published in 1998 by Dark Horse Comics, The Clowns is dedicated in memory of Mould.

== References in popular culture ==
- In the Agatha Christie short story "Swan Song", a tale of revenge referencing Tosca, the final line is "la commedia e finita!"
- In the 1936 film The Great Ziegfeld, a section of "Vesti la giubba" is featured during the famously large-scale "A Pretty Girl Is Like a Melody" sequence. A closeup of Canio marks the only cut in the entire scene.
- In Batman comic books and media adaptations, the Joker, an insane supervillain who resembles a clown with homicidal tendencies, often makes references to this opera. For instance, the character makes a reference to the lyrics in the story, "The Case of the Joker's Crime Circus" in Batman No. 4. In addition, the opera is featured in the Batman television series episode "The Joker is Wild", where the Joker is disguised as the lead character of the opera, singing "Vesti la giubba".
- The song "(I'm Afraid) The Masquerade Is Over", written by Allie Wrubel and Herb Magidson and popularized in 1939 by both the Larry Clinton and Jimmy Dorsey orchestras, references Pagliacci in the lines, "I guess I'll have to play Pagliacci and get myself a clown's disguise/And learn to laugh like Pagliacci with tears in my eyes." The song was most notably covered by Marvin Gaye in 1961 for Motown Records.
- In the 1943 German and Italian films Lache Bajazzo and I pagliacci, simultaneously produced, a clown who has been jailed for jealously murdering his wife narrates his story to the composer Leoncavallo.
- The song "Mr. Sandman", written by Pat Ballard and popularized in 1954 by The Chordettes, references Pagliacci in the lines, "Give him a lonely heart like Pagliacci, And lots of wavy hair like Liberace."
- The 1970 Smokey Robinson and the Miracles hit "The Tears of a Clown" references Pagliacci in the lines "Just like Pagliacci did, I try to keep my sadness hid". An earlier song cowritten by Robinson, "My Smile Is Just a Frown Turned Upside", sung by Carolyn Crawford in 1964, had included the same line.
- In the 49th episode of the sitcom Seinfeld, "The Opera", the characters attend a production of Pagliacci.
- In Batman: The Animated Series, episode 52 "Birds of a Feather", story by Chuck Menville and directed by Frank Pour, Oswald Chesterfield Cobblepot, also known as the Penguin, goes out with Veronica Vreeland to see the opera Pagliacci, in which he tries to sing with the clown, but he is way out of tune.
- In Shock Corridor, one of the patients is named after the opera. This patient has a caricature of Canio above his bed.
- In Cabrini, the famous solo "Vesti la giubba" is sung by Rolando Villazón playing Enrico DiSalvo.
- The protagonist of Pagliacci, Canio, also appears as a legendary joker card in the poker-themed video game Balatro. The Canio joker card grows more powerful when face cards are destroyed, a nod to the murders Canio commits.
- The opera is performed in The Simpsons episode "The Italian Bob" (2005) in which Sideshow Bob sings the final verse of "Vesti la giubba".
- Pagliacci is referenced in I Will Have Vengeance, the first novel in the Commissario Ricciardi series by Maurizio De Giovanni and its television adaptation. The story follows a murder inquiry at a Neapolitan theatre where the opera was on stage, and the murder mimicking the plot.
- Episode 4 of the 4th season of Netflix drama The Diplomat is entitled 'Pagliacci'. The fictional UK Prime Minister Nicol Trowbridge is found preparing for a speech in a flash-forward, singing along with a recording of the opera. In the scene, he makes his way down the stairs of 10 Downing St, as Tonio, in clown costume in a hallucination.
- Spike Jones, the American comedian and bandleader created a 1950 spoof tribute of the opera in his popular number 'Pal-Yat-Chee', sung by the characters Homer & Jethro.
- In a Kellogg's ad in the 1960s, actor Johnny Haymer sang "No more Rice Krispies / We ran out of Rice Krispies," to the tune of Vesti la giubba.
