= Fever Season =

Fever Season may refer to:

- Fever Season, a 1987 science fiction anthology in the Merovingen Nights series
- Fever Season, a 1998 novel by Barbara Hambly in the Benjamin January mysteries series
- Fever Season (EP), a 2019 extended play by GFriend
