= The Witches of Wenshar =

Fantasy novel by Barbara Hambly

- Author: Barbara Hambly
- Series: Sun Wolf and Starhawk
- Genre: Fantasy
- Publisher: Del Rey Books
- Publication date: 1987
- ISBN: 978-0345329349
- Preceded by: The Ladies of Mandrigyn
- Followed by: The Unschooled Wizard

The Witches of Wenshar is a fantasy novel by Barbara Hambly published in 1987. It is the sequel to The Ladies of Mandrigyn, the first book of Hambly's Sun Wolf and Starhawk series.

== Premise ==
Seeking training in the arts of magic, former mercenaries Sun Wolf and Starhawk travel to the southern kingdom of Wenshar and become involved in a series of supernatural murders.

== Plot summary ==
Nine months after the events of The Ladies of Mandrigyn, Sun Wolf and Starhawk arrive in the southern kingdom of Wenshar. Sun Wolf seeks training from professed sorceress Kaletha, but they clash over her methods and Sun Wolf doubts her true abilities.

Sun Wolf rescues King Osgard from a bandit ambush outside a tavern and brings him back to his 16-year-old daughter, Taswind. Osgard enlists Sun Wolf to train his nine-year-old son Jeryn in combat, taking over for the unsuccessful tutelage of the boy's uncle, Commander Nanciormis. After consulting with Starhawk, Sun Wolf tentatively agrees to a test period of one week.

While staying in Tandieras, the King's fortress, Sun Wolf and Starhawk are troubled by signs of dark forces at work. They encounter unexplained animal sacrifices and visions in middle of the night. Starhawk practices meditation to soothe her mind, and Sun Wolf tries in vain to teach Jeryn, who lasts only a few hours before quitting. Sun Wolf continues his training with Kaletha and is joined by Anshebbeth, Taswind's governess, who struggles to find her abilities.

Princess Taswind prefers wearing boy's clothes and shows great physical skill, but she is bound to study wifely duties for her upcoming marriage to Incarsyn, a prince from a neighboring kingdom. Jeryn rejects physical training and prefers his studies in the library. The boy is rebuked by Osgard for his cowardice, and Osgard then chastises Sun Wolf for associating with Kaletha, believing that she is witch who will bring the curses of Wenshar back to his kingdom. Sun Wolf leaves Osgard's employ and retreats to the abandoned desert city of old Wenshar but is followed by Jeryn.

Starhawk and Taswind escape the princess's meeting with her betrothed prince to mount a search party to old Wenshar, which is rumored to be inhabited by demons since its destruction 150 years ago. After finding Jeryn, the group is caught in a deadly sandstorm, but they are saved when Taswind uses her hidden magical abilities.

Sun Wolf returns to Tandieras to use his own powers to heal Taswind. Soon after, a series of gruesome murders occurs in the king's fortress, leading to a failed attack on Commander Nanciormis. Sun Wolf and Starhawk discover that Kaletha possesses ancient books of magic written by the Witches of Wenshar, which can be used to summon demons.

Prince Incarsyn is found slain, and Sun Wolf is arrested and accused of the murders. Under threat of Starhawk's torture, he falsifies a confession and is sentenced to die the following day. Taswind and Jeryn use their knowledge of Tandieras's secret tunnels to help sun Wolf and Starhawk escape.

Sun Wolf attempts to trap the demons with magic, but his plans are disrupted when Nanciormis and Kaletha lead a team of soldiers to capture the group. Sun Wolf and Starhawk deduce that Anshebbeth has been the architect of the murders, using Kaletha's ancient books as a source of power when she could not meet Kaletha's expectations. Unable to control the demons, Anshebbeth's jealousy and obsession with her secret lover, Nanciormis, directed the dark forces to attack the victims.

Exposed, Anshebbeth slays Kaletha at a sacred altar and pleads forgiveness from Nanciormis. The demons react to Anshebbeth's emotions and attack Nanciormis, but Anshebbeth sacrifices herself to save him. The demons tear her apart and disappear now that the source of their summoning has gone.

King Osgard learns the truth but sends Sun Wolf and Starhwak away from the city for their own safety. Sun Wolf sends Taswind to Mandrigyn to study with Yirth, his former teacher. He takes some books of magic with him as he and Starhawk move on in search of a new mentor.

== Reception ==
Dave Langford reviewed The Witches of Wenshar for White Dwarf #96, and stated that "It's easy to make a mystery when only the author knows precisely how this world's magic works; but Hambly issues enough clues for a Christie-like semblance of fairness, and the pages turn increasingly quickly."

In Issue 12 of Gateways, Susan Kreider commented, "With Sun Wolf and Starhawk, Barbara Hambly has created two of the most interesting characters in fantasy today, [but] some of the other character are less convincing." Kreider also noted the use of anachronistic modern phrases like "pretty sure". Kreider also felt the many descriptions of the desert "seems interesting, but eventually [is] overdone." Despite these issues, Kreider concluded, "Nevertheless, The Witches of Wenshar is a well-plotted and interesting fantasy adventure."

== Other reviews ==
- Faren Miller, in Locus, #317 (June 1987)
- Phyllis McDonald, in Interzone, #23 (Spring 1988)
