= Traveling with the Dead =

Horror novel

- Cover of first edition
- Author: Barbara Hambly
- Cover artist: Wictor Sadowski
- Language: English
- Series: James Asher Chronicles
- Genre: Horror/mystery
- Publisher: Del Rey/Ballantine
- Publication date: 1995
- Publication place: United States
- Media type: Print (hardcover)
- Pages: 343
- ISBN: 0-345-38102-5
- Preceded by: Those Who Hunt the Night
- Followed by: Blood Maidens

Traveling with the Dead is a 1995 horror/mystery novel by American writer Barbara Hambly. It was first published in hardcover by Del Rey/Ballantine in September 1995, with a paperback edition following from the same publisher in November 1996. The first British edition was published in paperback by Voyager in September 1995. An ebook edition was issued by Open Road Integrated Media in March 2011. The novel has also been translated into French. The novel placed second in the 1996 Locus Poll Award for Best Horror/Dark Fantasy Novel, and won the 1996 Lord Ruthven Award for fiction.

== Plot summary ==
In this sequel to Those Who Hunt the Night, professor James Asher and his young wife, Lydia, are again swept up in the dangerous world of the undead.

It is 1908, and a weary Asher, traveling home from his tiresome duties as executor of a relative's estate, spots Charles Farren, vampire Earl of Ernchester, clearly involved in some intrigue with mercenary and enemy spy Ignace Karolyi. Asher, who had left the secret service years ago to wed Lydia, reluctantly trails the pair to Paris, wiring Lydia to alert her to the danger.

But Lydia is aware of something Asher does not know: an obscure footnote in one of her medical journals clues her into the fact that the safe house Asher is planning to use is in the hands of a double agent, actually in league with Karolyi. To save her husband, Lydia seeks the assistance of the oldest of the London vampires: the enigmatic and haughty Simon Ysidro.

Ysidro agrees to help, to keep Farren from forming an alliance with humans, but on one condition: over Lydia's strenuous objections, he recruits a drab but romantic-minded governess, Margaret Potton, to travel with them as Lydia's chaperon. The three of them trail Asher across Europe to Constantinople, as he joins forces with Farren's strong-willed and alluring vampire-wife, Anthea.

In Constantinople, the trail dies, as Asher has been kidnapped by the vampire lord of the city, who is struggling to keep control as a rival seeks to destroy him. Asher tries to uncover his own role in the power struggle, for this may hold the key to his survival.

Meanwhile, Lydia and Ysidro explore the city, Lydia through Asher's diplomatic connections, Ysidro through his nocturnal prowlings, seeking any clue as to where Asher and Charles have disappeared to, even as Margaret's obsession with Ysidro and jealousy of Lydia endanger them all.

Only by unwinding the threads of money trails, strange business transactions, and a series of increasingly gruesome murders can Ysidro and Lydia find Charles and Asher, and escape the city alive.
