= Damaged (film) =

2024 film by Terry McDonough

- Release poster
- Directed by: Terry McDonough
- Screenplay by: Koji Steven Sakai; Gianni Capaldi; Paul Aniello
- Story by: Paul Aniello; Gianni Capaldi
- Produced by: Paul Aniello; Gianni Capaldi; Roman Kopelevich
- Starring: Samuel L. Jackson; Vincent Cassel; Gianni Capaldi; Laura Haddock; John Hannah; Kate Dickie
- Cinematography: Matthias Pötsch
- Edited by: Luis de la Madrid; Sean Albertson; Kurt Nishimura
- Music by: Andrea Ridolfi
- Production companies: Red Sea Media; Tartan Bridge Films; High Five Films
- Distributed by: Signature Entertainment (United Kingdom); Lionsgate (United States)
- Release date: April 12, 2024
- Running time: 97 minutes
- Countries: United Kingdom; United States
- Language: English

Damaged is a 2024 crime thriller film directed by Terry McDonough and starring Samuel L. Jackson, Vincent Cassel and Gianni Capaldi. It follows Chicago-based detective Dan Lawson (Jackson) who investigates a string of serial killings in Scotland alongside another detective, Walker Bravo (Cassel). As the case continues, Lawson discovers a pattern similar to another killing spree he handled five years prior.

Damaged was released in select theaters, including on demand and digital on April 12, 2024. The film received negative reviews from critics.

== Premise ==
Chicago homicide detective Dan Lawson is called upon by Scottish authorities to assist in the investigation of a string of serial killings alongside another detective, Walker Bravo. Lawson discerns a pattern that connects with another killing spree he investigated five years prior.

== Cast ==
- Samuel L. Jackson as Det. Dan Lawson
- Vincent Cassel as Det. Walker Bravo
- Gianni Capaldi as Glen Boyd
- Kate Dickie as Laura Kessler
- John Hannah as Colin McGregor
- Laura Haddock as Marie Boyd
- Brian McCardie as Avery Thompson
- Elaine C. Smith as Elizabeth Walsh
- Brian Pettifer as Village Man
- Mark Holden as Captain Ford

== Production ==
In March 2023, it was announced that filming began in Scotland. Filming wrapped in May 2023.

== Release ==
Damaged was released in select theaters and on demand and digital on April 12, 2024.

== Reception ==
On the review aggregator website Rotten Tomatoes, 27% of 22 critics' reviews are positive, with an average rating of 4.6/10.
