= Dragonsbane =

1985 fantasy novel by Barbara Hambly

- First edition, cover art by Michael Whelan
- Author: Barbara Hambly
- Cover artist: Michael Whelan
- Language: English
- Series: Winterlands
- Genre: Fantasy novel
- Published: 1985 (Del Rey Books)
- Publication place: United States
- Media type: Print (Paperback)
- Pages: 352
- ISBN: 0-345-31572-3
- OCLC: 13000587
- Followed by: Dragonshadow

Dragonsbane is a fantasy novel written by author Barbara Hambly and published by Del Rey Books in 1985.

== Plot summary ==
A witch, Jenny Waynest, and lord, John Aversin, who live in the decaying Northlands are approached by a young southern noble, Gareth, who requests they slay a dragon in the capital city of Bel to the south. The pair agree on the condition the king send troops to the north to fend off bandits. On arriving, it is revealed that Gareth is not a mere noble, but the prince of the realm seeking aid against the wishes of his father. The dragon is revealed as Morkeleb the Black, an ancient and powerful dragon, now inhabiting the caverns of the gnomes. In addition, the sorceress Zyerne is revealed to hold the king in her power, dominating him with the goal of capturing the power of the Stone in the heart of the gnomish Deep. John is persuaded to kill Morkeleb, with Jenny's assistance, but is himself wounded and Jenny is forced to save the dragon's life in exchange for that of John's. In saving Morkeleb's life, Jenny's weak powers are much augmented, allowing her to confront Zyerne but also tempting her to transform into a dragon and abandon the concerns of humanity. Zyrene enters the Deep, attempting to claim its magic, but is defeated when the Stone is destroyed by John, Jenny and Morkeleb. Jenny accepts Morkeleb's offer to transform into a dragon, but later returns to the North, unable to live without her humanity.

== Awards and nominations ==
Dragonsbane was a Locus Award nominee in 1986 and 1987.

== Critical reception ==
Overall, the critical reception to Hambly's book was positive.

In the September 1986 issue of Locus, Faren Miller praised the novel, stating, "This is literary alchemy of a high order, and it confirms Hambly's place as one of the best new fantasists." Miller noted "When the author is Barbara Hambly, prepare for something special."

Dave Langford reviewed Dragonsbane for White Dwarf #79, and stated that "her hero slays dragons only with extreme reluctance and by fighting dirty, the traditional witch is not only the hero's lover but a strong heroine in her own right, and the dragon is a damned sight more sympathetic than some of its victims."

Betsy Shorb, writing for School Library Journal, observed, "This fantasy is peopled with appealing, fully delineated characters, even the dragon Morkeleb. The conflict between the need to love and the need to develop one's talents add even more interest to an already interesting quest."

In Issue 13 of Gateways, Susan Kreider noted, "Once again, Barbara Hambly presents fascinating and believable characters at the center of her story ... [but] by far the most intriguing character in Dragonsbane, however, is the dragon himself, Markeleb." Kreider was disappointed in the end of the book, pointing out "The last page of the penultimate chapter ends the story quite effectively, and the reader may come away from the book with the impression that the last chapter was added on under an editor's pressure for a happy ending."

Dave Roy, writing for Curled Up with a Good Book, wrote, "Dragonsbane has everything you could look for in a fantasy book: wonderful characterization, non-stereotypical dragons, beautiful prose--and it's self-contained as well." Speaking more on characterization, Roy noted, "Hambly's characterization is first-rate, and she plays most of her characters against stereotype. ... I would be remiss if I didn't mention the dragon. Hambly has created a truly three-dimensional character in him.... He's not your normal dragon, and he's more than just an adversary."

Fantasy Cafe site gave the book an 8 out of 10, writing, "While it was a somewhat slow paced book, Dragonsbane managed to pull me in immediately with the way it introduced the characters in the very first chapter. ... Hambly took what felt like a very traditional fantasy story and made it unexpectedly unique." Moreover, the unique love story also received the reviewer's approval: "It was about established, mature love that’s existed for a while.... It was a nice change to read about a couple who has been together for a while instead of romance filled with significant glances and conversations and wondering when/how the two people would end up together."

During episode #794 of the Tim Ferriss Show, Brandon Sanderson credited that reading Dragonsbane in middle school was the book that opened his eyes to the importance of reading, and the magic of authors connecting to readers on a profound level.

== Editions ==
- Dragonsbane (ebook)

Published March 29, 2011, Open Road Integrated Media ebook, 342 pages

- Dragonsbane (Winterlands #1)

Published March 23, 2011, Open Road Kindle Edition

- Dragonsbane (Mass Market Paperback)

Published May 12, 1987, Del Rey Mass Market Paperback, 341 pages

- Dragonsbane (Winterlands #1)

Published December 12, 1985, Del Rey Mass Market Paperback, 352 pages
