= The Bastards of Pizzofalcone =

Italian police procedural television series

- Italian DVD cover (Season 1)
- Italian: I bastardi di Pizzofalcone
- Genre: Police procedural; Crime drama
- Based on: I bastardi di Pizzofalcone by Maurizio de Giovanni
- Written by: Silvia Napolitano; Francesca Panzarella; Maurizio de Giovanni; Dido Castelli; Salvatore De Mola; Graziano Diana; Salvatore Basile; Angelo Petrella; Paolo Terracciano
- Directed by: Carlo Carlei; Alessandro D'Alatri; Monica Vullo
- Starring: Alessandro Gassmann; Carolina Crescentini; Massimiliano Gallo; Tosca D'Aquino; Gianfelice Imparato; Antonio Folletto; Simona Tabasco; Serena Iansiti; Gennaro Silvestro
- Composers: Pasquale Catalano; Andrea Ridolfi; Vito Abbonato
- Country of origin: Italy
- Original languages: Neapolitan; Italian
- No. of seasons: 4
- No. of episodes: 22

Production
- Producers: Giusi Buondonno; Francesca Loiero
- Cinematography: Armando Buttafava Bonalloggi; Marco Pieroni
- Editors: Carlo Fontana; Emiliano Bellardini; Danilo Perticara
- Running time: 97–108 minutes
- Production companies: Clemart; Rai Fiction

Original release
- Network: Rai 1
- Release: 9 January 2017 – 13 November 2023

The Bastards of Pizzofalcone (Italian: I bastardi di Pizzofalcone) is an Italian police procedural crime drama television series based on the I bastardi di Pizzofalcone novels by Maurizio de Giovanni. It premiered on Rai 1 on 9 January 2017, and ran for four seasons.

== Plot ==
A group of ragtag detectives from the Pizzofalcone police station in Naples investigate complex cases.

== Cast ==
- Alessandro Gassmann as Inspector Giuseppe Lojacono
- Carolina Crescentini as Prosecutor Laura Piras
- Massimiliano Gallo as Commissioner Luigi Palma
- Tosca D'Aquino as Deputy Superintendent Ottavia Calabrese
- Gianfelice Imparato as Deputy Commissioner Giorgio Pisanelli
- Antonio Folletto as Agent Marco Aragona
- Simona Tabasco as Agent Alessandra "Alex" Di Nardo
- Serena Iansiti as Medical Examiner Rosaria Martone
- Gennaro Silvestro as Assistant Chief Francesco Romano
- Maria Vera Ratti as Commissioner Elsa Martini

== Episodes ==
=== Series overview ===
Series	Episodes	Originally released		
Series	Episodes	First released	Last released	Network
1	6	9 January 2017	6 February 2017	Rai 1
2	6	8 October 2018	12 November 2018	Rai 1
3	6	20 September 2021	25 October 2021	Rai 1
4	4	23 October 2023	13 November 2023	Rai 1

=== Season 1 ===
No. overall	No. in season	Title	Duration	Original release date
1	1	"Bastards" (I bastardi)	104 min	9 January 2017
2	2	"Anger" (Rabbia)	97 min	10 January 2017
3	3	"Neighbors" (Vicini)	104 min	16 January 2017
4	4	"Cold" (Gelo)	106 min	23 January 2017
5	5	"Mercy" (Misericordia)	108 min	30 January 2017
6	6	"Darkness" (Buio)	97 min	6 February 2017

=== Season 2 ===
No. overall	No. in season	Title	Duration	Original release date
7	1	"Babies" (Cuccioli)	106 min	8 October 2018
8	2	"Bread" (Pane)	105 min	15 October 2018
9	3	"Jewelry" (Gioielli)	101 min	22 October 2018
10	4	"Tango"	107 min	29 October 2018
11	5	"Souvenir"	105 min	5 November 2018
12	6	"Betrayals" (Tradimenti)	105 min	12 November 2018

=== Season 3 ===
No. overall	No. in season	Title	Duration	Original release date
13	1	"Fires" (Fuochi)	99 min	20 September 2021
14	2	"Empty" (Vuoto)	104 min	27 September 2021
15	3	"Roses" (Rose)	97 min	3 October 2021
16	4	"Wedding" (Nozze)	107 min	11 October 2021
17	5	"Blood" (Sangue)	105 min	18 October 2021
18	6	"Truth" (Verità)	99 min	25 October 2021

=== Season 4 ===
No. overall	No. in season	Title	Duration	Original release date
19	1	"Music" (Musica)	TBA	23 October 2023
20	2	"Flowers" (Fiori)	TBA	30 October 2023
21	3	"Angels" (Angeli)	TBA	6 November 2023
22	4	"Deceptions" (Inganni)	TBA	13 November 2023

== Production ==
The series is filmed in various locations around Naples, including the Palazzo Carafa di Santa Severina, the Certosa di San Martino, the Toledo station, the Quartieri Spagnoli, Mergellina, the Universitá Monte Sant'Angelo, Santa Caterina a Formiello, Sant'Anna dei Lombardi, Largo Tarsia, the Piazza del Gesù Nuovo, Largo Sellaria, Villa Gallotti, and the Centro Direzionale.

== Release ==
The pilot episode was aired on 9 January 2017, while the second episode aired the following day.

The second season premiered on 8 October 2018.

The third season began production in late 2018 and premiered on 20 September 2021.

The fourth season began airing on 23 October 2023.

== Reception ==
=== Awards and nominations ===
Year	Award	Category	Nominee(s)	Result	Ref.
2022	Nastri d'Argento Grandi Serie	Best Crime Series	I bastardi di Pizzofalcone	Won	

== Controversy ==
The lesbian relationship between Alex Di Nardo and Rosaria Martone resulted in complaints from the Catholic newspaper Avvenire as well as from Maurizio Lupi, a member of the Italian Parliament and Popular Area coalition. In response, star Alessandro Gassmann tweeted, "I want to thank Avvenire for the controversy over the lesbian scenes in Pizzofalcone! They bring luck! See you Monday!!"
