= Fiorello Giraud =

Italian opera singer

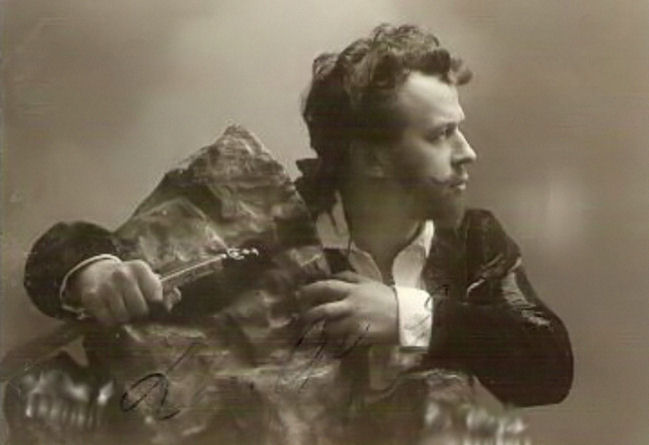
Fiorello Giraud as Don José in Carmen

Fiorello Giraud (22 October 1870 – 28 March 1928) was an Italian operatic tenor who sang leading roles in many Italian opera houses during the course of his career, including La Scala, the Teatro Regio di Parma, and the Teatro Regio di Torino, as well as in Spain, Portugal, and Latin America. He is remembered today for having created the role of Canio in the world premiere of Leoncavallo's Pagliacci.

== Life ==
Giraud was born in Parma, the son of the tenor Lodovico Giraud, and began studying singing with tenor Enrico Barbacini at the Parma Conservatory. He made his stage debut in December 1891 at the Teatro Civico in Vercelli as Lohengrin. The following year he sang Canio in the world premiere of Pagliacci at the Teatro Dal Verme in Milan, a role which he sang many more times in his career. Most of his roles were in the lyric tenor and spinto tenor Italian repertoire. However, later in his career his voice had become heavy enough to take on further Wagnerian roles such as Tristan in Tristan und Isolde, Walther in Die Meistersinger von Nürnberg, and Siegfried in the first performance of Götterdämmerung at La Scala.

After he retired from the stage, he taught singing in Parma where he died in 1928 at the age of 57.

== Recordings ==
According to the Marston website:

=== Gramophone & typewriter, ltd. ===
==== April 1904, Milan / With piano, Salvatore Cottone ====
1.	TANNHÄUSER: Dir töne Lob! (Sia lode a te!) (Wagner)	2:37
	(2190h) 52047	
2.	DIE MEISTERSINGER: Am stillen Herd (Nel verno al piè) (Wagner)	3:31
	(2191h) 52048	
3.	DIE MEISTERSINGER: Fanget an! So rief der Lenz in den Wald (Appena il mite aprile) (Wagner)	3:29
	(274i) 052071	
4.	CARMEN: La fleur que tu m’avais jetée (Il fior che avevi a me tu dato)(Bizet)	3:29
	(272i) 052069	
5.	LUISA MILLER: Quando le sere al placido (Verdi)	3:29
	(273I) 052070	
6.	ANDREA CHÉNIER: Come un bel dì di maggio (Giordano)	2:42
	(2188h) 52046	
7.	Oblio! (Tosti)	2:47
	(2192h) 52049	
8.	Ancora! (Tosti)	4:04
	(271i) 052067	
=== The gramophone company, ltd. ===
==== 1916-1917, Milan / With orchestra ====
9.	Rosa (Tosti)	3:47
	16 March 1916; (6439ae) 7-52081	
10.	Sogno (Tosti)	2:48
	16 March 1916; (6440ae) 7-52082	
11.	Io ricordo, madonna, quella sera (No. 1 from Per Lei) (Tosti)	3:02
	16 March 1916; (6441ae)7-52084	
12.	Invano! (Tosti)	3:30
	16 March 1916; (6443ae) 052085	
13.	Serenata (Toselli)	2:48
	18 March 1916; (6445ae) 052091	
14.	Lungi (Tosti)	3:12
	18 March 1916; (6446ae) 052088	
15.	Primavera (Tosti)	2:43
	18 March 1916; (6447ae) 052089	
16.	Oblio! (Tosti)	2:57
	1 April 1916; (6488ae) 7-52083	
17.	Ave Maria (Grigolata)	3:27
	1 April 1916; (6489ae) 052090	
18.	Non m’ama più (Tosti)	3:31
	1 April 1916; (6490ae) 052086	
19.	JOCELYN: Berceuse (Godard)	2:48
	18 July 1917 (20092b) 7-252182	
20.	Sérénade d’autrefois (Serenata medioevale) (Silvestri)	3:26
	18 July 1917; (20093 ½ b) 7-52133	
