= The Time of the Dark =

1982 fantasy novel by Barbara Hambly

The Time of the Dark is a novel by Barbara Hambly published in 1982. It is the first volume of the Darwath Trilogy.

== Plot ==
The Time of the Dark is the first of a three-part series of novels set in Darwath, a mystical realm located near to ours across the Void. In this novel, the wizard Ingold Inglorion recruits two people from our world – Rudy Solis and Gil Patterson – to help him in his battles against the Dark, a powerful race bent on destroying or enslaving all of mankind.

== Reception ==
Dave Langford reviewed The Time of the Dark for White Dwarf #67, and wrote that "cleverly anti-romantic touches make this a lot more appealing than you might expect from the cover or the chill news that it's volume 1 of a trilogy. Above average, I suppose."
