= The Walls of Air =

The Walls of Air is a novel by Barbara Hambly published in 1983. It is the second part of The Darwath Trilogy.

== Plot summary ==
The Walls of Air is the second of a three-part series of novels set in Darwath, a mystical realm located near to ours across the Void. In this novel, the wizard Ingold Inglorion and his recruits from our world - Rudy Solis and Gil Patterson - lead the refugees to a form of safety from the Dark in the Keep of Dare. Rudy and Ingold set off to find the Hidden City of Quo. There they hope to find the Archmage Lothiro and the magical might of the Wizards of Darwath, hidden from the Dark behind the Walls of Air.

== Chapter outline ==
Chapter one: The Dark besiege the Keep of Dare. Rudy finds a wizard's room and a seeing stone.

Chapter two: The Dark attempt to break into the Keep. Ingold holds the doors - but only the wizards can see it. Ingold and Rudy leave for Quo.

Chapter three: The journey to Quo begins. Rudy beings to learn.

Chapter four: Gil stands guard. Minalde delivers food to the refugees of Penambra.

Chapter five: Ingold and Rudy continue their journey. They meet refugees in the desert.

Chapter six: The refugees at the Tall Gates ambush the forage party for their food. Criminals sneak out for extra food. Gil is forced to kill.

Chapter seven: An execution. Gil begins to investigate the church records. Gil and the queen search for and find the seeing room. Gil recognizes her love for Ingold.

Chapter eight: Rudy gets lost. Alone, he heads west towards Quo.

Chapter nine: Rudy is captured by White Raiders. Ingold saves him from death by spear. The Dark have abandoned the north.

Chapter ten: Rudy and Ingold visit an abandoned hole of the Dark with the White Raiders.

Chapter eleven: The imperial messenger arrives. Gil and Alde search the Keep. Gil makes a discovery about Quo.

Chapter twelve: The Walls of Air. Rudy and Ingold are attacked and misled. They slay the dragon that was once a council member.

Chapter thirteen: Snelgrin, corrupted by the Dark, attempts to kill Tir and open the gates, only to be stopped by Gil.

Chapter fourteen: The city of wizards is found, completely destroyed by the Dark. Lohiro is there - but only a puppet for the Dark. Lohiro is slain.

Chapter fifteen: The journey back to the Keep of Dare. A summons is answered.

Chapter sixteen: The story of the fall of Quo is told.

== Reception ==
Dave Langford reviewed The Walls of Air for White Dwarf #69, writing, "Nothing's truly original [...] and Hambly's making much better use of routine materials."

== Reviews ==
- Review by Roger C. Schlobin (1983) in Fantasy Newsletter, #57 March 1983
- Review by Chris Henderson (1983) in Whispers #19-20, October 1983
