= Raffaella Ocone =

Professor of Chemical Engineering

- Born: Morcone, Italy
- Occupation: Professor of Chemical Engineering

Academic background
- Education: Princeton University University of Naples Federico II

Academic work
- Institutions: Heriot-Watt University
- Notable works: Special Topics in Transport Phenomena, Elsevier (2001)

Raffaella Ocone OBE FRSE FREng is Professor of Chemical Engineering at Heriot-Watt University and a Fellow of the Royal Academy of Engineering. In 2006, she was awarded the title Cavaliere of the Order of Merit of the Italian Republic and in the 2019 New Year Honours she was appointed OBE.

== Early life and education ==
Ocone was born in Morcone, Italy. She graduated from the University of Naples Federico II with a Laurea (degree) in Chemical Engineering. In 1989, she achieved her MA, and in 1992 her PhD, both from Princeton University.

== Career ==
Ocone's first role after her PhD was as a lecturer at the University of Naples Federico II, from 1991 to 1995. Following this, she was a reader at the University of Nottingham, and a visiting professor at Louisiana State University in the US and the Claude Bérnard University, Lyon in France. She was the first “Caroline Herschel Visiting Professor” at RHUR Universität, Bochum, Germany (July–November 2017) and the recipient of a Visiting Research Fellowship from the Institute for Advanced Studies, University of Bologna, Italy (March–April 2018).

She has been professor of chemical engineering at Heriot-Watt University since 1999, and she was the first female professor of chemical engineering in Scotland. In 2003 she became a Chartered Engineer with the Engineering Council. She is also a Chartered Scientist with the Science Council.

Her research is in the field of modelling of complex reactive systems, for which she has been internationally recognised, including election as Fellow to a number of Royal Societies. Her work has application to the design and operation of industrial systems involving material flow. In 2013 Ocone was elected a Fellow of the Royal Academy of Engineering, which she described as "the greatest accolade for an engineer". She is an authority on complex reactive systems, and her research has been applied to the development of carbon capture and storage technologies. She co-authored at Royal Academy of Engineering report, funded by the UK government, on the biofuels industry.

She has an interest in ethics and engineering and chaired the Royal Academy of Engineering’s Teaching Ethics group.

=== Awards ===
- Fellow of the Institution of Chemical Engineers (2003)
- Fellow of the Royal Society of Chemistry (2003)
- Fellow of the Royal Society of Edinburgh (2006)
- Cavaliere (Knighthood), Order of the Star of Italian Solidarity (2006)
- Fellow of the Royal Society of Arts (2009)
- Fellow of the Royal Academy of Engineering (2013)
- Established Career Felliowship Heriot-Watt University (2019)
- Order of the British Empire (for services to engineering) (2019)

=== Public engagement ===
Ocone wrote on the 2040 ban on new petrol and diesel cars and on the sustainability of BECCS for The Conversation, an independent news source from the academic and research community. In 2016 she hosted an event in conversation with author Roberto Constantini at the Italian Institute in Edinburgh, discussing the success of the detective story. The previous year, she took part in a similar event with author Maurizio de Giovanni. 2018 she delivered a lecture at the plenary session on Investigating Wet Particle Systems.as part of the discussion on 21st century energy mix. She has challenged some of the proposed solutions to the carbon crisis such as the conversion of power stations to use wood chips.

== Selected publications ==
- Makkawi, Y; Ocone, R (2011). "Mass transfer in fluidized bed drying of moist particulate". Mass Transfer. INTECH. ISBN 978-953-307-215-9.
- Adam, M; Calemma, V; Galimberti, F; Gambaro, C; Heiszwolf, J; Ocone, R (2012). "Continuum Lumping Kinetics of Complex Reactive Systems". Chemical Engineering Science. 76: 154–164. Bibcode:2012ChEnS..76..154A. doi:10.1016/j.ces.2012.03.037.
- Ocone, R (2012). "Transport Phenomena in Packed Bed Reactor Technology for Chemical Looping Combustion". Chemical Engineering Research and Design. 90 (10): 1625–1631. Bibcode:2012CERD...90.1625O. doi:10.1016/j.cherd.2012.02.012.
- Adam, M; Arrighi, V; Ocone, R (2012). "Continuum Lumping for Step Growth Polymerisation". Chemical Engineering Research and Design. 90: 2287–2292. doi:10.1016/j.cherd.2012.05.005.
- Adam, M; Ocone, R (2013). "Kinetics Investigations of Kraft Lignin Pyrolysis". Industrial & Engineering Chemistry Research. 52 (26): 8645–8654. doi:10.1021/ie400979x.
- Ocone, R (2013). "Ethics and the Accreditation". Education for Chemical Engineers. 8: 113–118. doi:10.1016/j.ece.2013.07.002.
- Astarita, G; Ocone, R (2001). Special Topics in Transport Phenomena. Elsevier Science. ISBN 9780080541549.
