= Dog Wizard =

1992 novel by Barbara Hambly

- Dog Wizard cover
- Author: Barbara Hambly
- Language: English
- Series: The Windrose Chronicles
- Genre: Fantasy novel
- Publisher: Del Rey Books
- Publication date: December 1992
- Publication place: United States
- Media type: Print (Paperback)
- Pages: 389 pp (paperback)
- ISBN: 978-0-345-37714-2
- OCLC: 27299339
- Preceded by: The Silicon Mage

Dog Wizard is a fantasy novel by Barbara Hambly and published by Del Rey Books in February, 1993. The book was a 1994 Locus Award nominee, and the third book of the Windrose Chronicles.

== Synopsis ==
The story opens with the exiled wizard Antryg Windrose and his companion Joanna living in California after their escape through the void to Earth, after being condemned to death in the previous book, The Silicon Mage.

The story continues as Joanna is kidnapped from her apartment by a mysterious person wearing the robes of a mage. Antryg is forced to respond to the call of the wizards who condemned them in order to track her whereabouts. After he arrives at the Citadel of Wizards, he realizes that he was brought there for a completely different reason, and that the wizards have no idea where Joanna is or who kidnapped her.
