= Those Who Hunt the Night =

Horror novel

- Cover of first edition under original title
- Author: Barbara Hambly
- Language: English
- Series: James Asher Chronicles
- Genre: Horror/mystery
- Publisher: Unwin Paperbacks
- Publication date: 1988
- Publication place: United Kingdom
- Media type: Print (paperback)
- Pages: 306
- ISBN: 0-04-440244-9
- Followed by: Traveling with the Dead

Those Who Hunt the Night is a 1988 horror/mystery novel by American writer Barbara Hambly.

It was first published in paperback by the British publisher Unwin Paperbacks in November 1988 under the title Immortal Blood. The first American edition was published in hardcover by Del Rey/Ballantine in December 1988 under the title Those Who Hunt the Night, which has been used for all subsequent English-language editions; a paperback edition followed from the same publisher in July 1989, and was reprinted in May 1991 and October 1995. A book club edition was issued by Del Rey in conjunction with the Science Fiction Book Club in June 1989. An ebook edition was issued by Open Road Integrated Media in March 2011.

The novel has also been translated into French. The novel won the 1989 Locus Award for Best Horror Novel.

== Plot summary ==
The 20th century is just under way, and somebody is killing the vampires of London. Against the wishes of his fellow undead, Simon Ysidro, oldest of the London vampires, seeks the assistance of Oxford professor James Asher, former spy for the British government. Ysidro gains Asher's cooperation by threatening the life of his beautiful young wife, Lydia.

Unbeknownst to Ysidro, Asher enlists the help of his wife, a physician with a keenly analytical mind. Asher prowls the streets and crypts of London with Ysidro, entering the dark underworld of the undead, as Lydia combs property records and medical journals for clues as to who might have the means and the motive to carry out the slaughter.

Asher's theory is that the killer must be a vampire himself, one able to remain awake and active in the daytime. Lydia develops a theory as to how such a vampire might come to be. Together Asher and Ysidro travel to Paris to seek out the mythical eldest of all vampires, Brother Anthony, who might be either the killer himself, or the key to the killer's undoing.

What they discover is a threat to the living as well as the undead. A scientist seeking to artificially endow British agents with the powers of vampires is behind the killings. The scientist's son has been transformed into a hybrid vampiric monster who can walk in the daylight, but craves the blood of other vampires to arrest the degeneration of his body. Asher and Ysidro, aided by Brother Anthony, destroy the hybrid vampire and end the threat. Ysidro leaves Asher and Lydia in peace and vanishes from their lives.

== Reception ==
Gahan Wilson, writing in Weird Tales, called Those Who Hunt the Night "a rousing melodrama" with "very beautifully realized vampires".
