= Andrea Ridolfi =

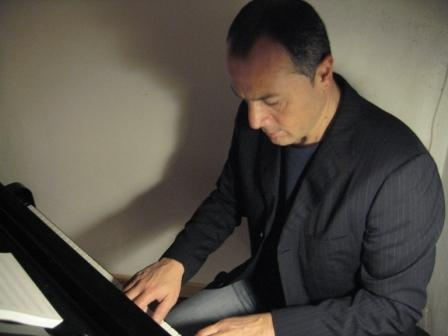
- Occupations: Musician; composer; orchestral director
- Years active: 1986–present

Andrea Ridolfi is an Italian musician, composer, and conductor.

== Discography ==
| Year | Title | Director | Notes |
|---|---|---|---|
| 1986 | E se dovesse capitare a te? | Massimo Russo | Play |
| 1989 | Parole e Crociate | Massimo Russo | Play |
| 1989 | Alien degli abissi | Antonio Margheriti | Film |
| 1989 | Marco e Laura dieci anni fa | Carlo Tuzii | TV movie |
| 1992 | Dio ce ne scampi e liberi | Sibilla Damiani | Film |
| 1996 | B.B.K., Baby Bounty Killer | Alessandro Valori | Short film |
| 1997 | Loggerheads | —N/a | Cartoon |
| 1998– 1999 | Domenica in | Roberto Croce; Stefano Vicario | TV entertainment programme |
| 1999 | Quattro scatti per l'Europa | Ivan Carlei | Short film |
| 2005– 2008 | La squadra | —N/a | TV series; 52 episodes |
| 2009 | Romanelli - Missione a Budapest | Gilberto Martinelli | Documentary |
| 2010 | Quando si diventa grandi | Massimo Bonetti | Film |
| 2011 | Il generale Della Rovere | Carlo Carlei | TV series |
| 2012 | Ben e Clara, le ultime lettere | —N/a | TV documentary series |
| 2012 | Il generale dei briganti | Paolo Poeti | TV series |
| 2012 | Sándor Márai e Napoli - Il sapore amaro della libertà | Gilberto Martinelli | Documentary |
| 2012 | Nel segno del tricolore - Italiani e ungheresi nel Risorgimento | Gilberto Martinelli | Documentary |
| 2013 | The Outsider - Il cinema di Antonio Margheriti | Edoardo Margheriti | Documentary |
| 2013 | Il disordine del cuore | Edoardo Margheriti | Film |
| 2013 | Un caso di coscienza | Luigi Perelli | TV series; 6 episodes |
| 2013 | La farfalla granata | Paolo Poeti | Film |
| 2014 | Il portone di piombo | Gilberto Martinelli | Documentary |
| 2015 | La Scala di Milano: Ungheresi alla Scala | Gilberto Martinelli | Documentary |
| 2015 | Roma o morte - La vita del colonnello di Garibaldi | Gilberto Martinelli | Documentary |
| 2015 | La storia di Árpád Weisz | Gilberto Martinelli | Documentary |
| 2016 | Il sindaco pescatore | Maurizio Zaccaro | Film |
| 2017 | The Bastards of Pizzofalcone | Carlo Carlei | TV series; 6 episodes |
| 2019 | Operation Budapest | Gilberto Martinelli | Documentary |
| 2020 | Stai Sereno (Stay Calm) | Davide Dapporto | Film |
| 2021 | La fuggitiva | Carlo Carlei | TV series; 8 episodes |
| 2021– 2022 | Mina Settembre | Tiziana Aristarco | TV series; 24 episodes |
| 2023 | Fiori Sopra l'Inferno | Carlo Carlei | TV series; 6 episodes |
| 2024 | Damaged | Terry McDonough | Film; English-language debut |

=== Other works ===
- 1991 – La condanna (sound engineer), directed by Marco Bellocchio
