= Inspector Ricciardi =

Italian crime drama television series

- Italian poster
- Italian: Il commissario Ricciardi
- Genre: Crime drama; Detective fiction
- Based on: Il commissario Ricciardi series by Maurizio De Giovanni
- Directed by: Alessandro D'Alatri; Gianpaolo Tescari
- Starring: Lino Guanciale; Antonio Milo; Enrico Ianniello; Serena Iansiti; Maria Vera Ratti; Mario Pirrello; Pepe Servillo; Marco Palvetti; Nunzia Schiano; Fabrizia Sacchi; Fiorenza D'Antonio; Christoph Hülsen
- Country of origin: Italy
- Original language: Italian
- No. of seasons: 3
- No. of episodes: 14

Production
- Running time: 98–110 minutes
- Production companies: Rai Fiction; Clemart

Original release
- Network: Rai 1
- Release: 25 January 2021 – present

Inspector Ricciardi (Italian: Il commissario Ricciardi) is an Italian crime drama television series based on the novels by Maurizio De Giovanni. It was first aired on Rai 1 on 25 January 2021.

== Premise ==
The series takes place in Naples in the 1930s at the height of Fascist Italy. Police Commissioner Luigi Ricciardi holds a powerful secret: he can see the ghosts of people who have died violent deaths and listen to their last thoughts. This ability, inherited from his mother, is a great help in his work but is also a cause of unhappiness.

== Cast ==
=== Main ===
- Lino Guanciale as Luigi Alfredo Ricciardi
- Antonio Milo as Raffaele Maione
- Enrico Ianniello as Bruno Modo
- Serena Iansiti as Livia Lucani
- Maria Vera Ratti as Enrica Colombo
- Mario Pirrello as Angelo Garzo
- Peppe Servillo as Don Pierino Fava
- Marco Palvetti as Falco
- Nunzia Schiano as Rosa Vaglio
- Fabrizia Sacchi as Lucia Caputo
- Fiorenza D'Antonio as Bianca Palmieri di Roccaspina
- Christoph Hülsen as Manfred Kaspar von Brauchitsch

=== Recurring ===
- Adriano Falivene as Bambinella
- Massimo De Matteo as Giulio Colombo
- Susy Del Giudice as Maria Tritone
- Roberto Giordano as Camarda
- Veronica D'Elia as Nelide
- Giovanni Allocca as Cesarano
- Nicola Acunzo as Sebastiano Ponte

== Episodes ==
=== Series overview ===
Series	Episodes	Originally released		
Series	Episodes	First released	Last released	Network
1	6	25 January 2021	1 March 2021	Rai 1
2	4	6 March 2023	21 March 2023	Rai 1
3	4	10 November 2025	1 December 2025	Rai 1

=== Season 1 ===
Season 1 premiered on 25 January 2021.

No. overall	No. in season	Title	Duration	Original release date
1	1	"Vengeance Will Be Mine" (Il senso del dolore)	104 min	25 January 2021
2	2	"Blood Curse" (La condanna del sangue)	109 min	1 February 2021
3	3	"Everyone in Their Place" (Il posto di ognuno)	100 min	8 February 2021
4	4	"The Day of the Dead" (Il giorno dei morti)	100 min	15 February 2021
5	5	"Viper" (Vipera)	98 min	22 February 2021
6	6	"At the Bottom of Your Heart" (In fondo al tuo cuore)	108 min	1 March 2021

=== Season 2 ===
Season 2 premiered on 6 March 2023.

No. overall	No. in season	Title	Duration	Original release date
7	1	"Fever" (Febbre)	102 min	6 March 2023
8	2	"Souls of Glass" (Anime di vetro)	106 min	13 March 2023
9	3	"Unnamed Serenade" (Serenata senza nome)	103 min	20 March 2023
10	4	"Winter Swallows" (Rondini d'inverno)	110 min	21 March 2023

=== Season 3 ===
Season 3 premiered on 10 November 2025.

No. overall	No. in season	Title	Duration	Original release date
11	1	"By My Hand" (Per mano mia)	TBC	10 November 2025
12	2	"The Living and the Dead" (I vivi e i morti)	TBC	17 November 2025
13	3	"The Angel's Purgatory" (Il purgatorio dell'angelo)	TBC	24 November 2025
14	4	"The Cry of Dawn" (Il pianto dell'alba)	TBC	1 December 2025

== Production ==
The series was filmed in various locations around Naples, including the Teatro di San Carlo, the Museo di Capodimonte, Villa Pignatelli, the Royal Palace of Portici, Capua, Castel Volturno, and Nocera Inferiore.
