= The Ladies of Mandrigyn =

1984 fantasy novel by Barbara Hambly

- Author: Barbara Hambly
- Language: English
- Genre: Fantasy
- Published: 1984
- Publisher: Ballantine Books
- Pages: 311
- ISBN: 9780345309198
- OCLC: 10612016

The Ladies of Mandrigyn is a fantasy novel by Barbara Hambly published in 1984.

== Premise ==
The Ladies of Mandrigyn is a novel in which a female resistance trains to fight for their occupied territory against an evil sorcerer.

== Plot summary ==
Following a successful siege, mercenary captain Sun Wolf and his female second in command Starhawk prepare their army to return home.

They are visited by Sheera, a wealthy noblewoman from Mandrigyn. The men of her city have been captured by the evil wizard Altiokis and forced to work in the mines below his fortress. Sun Wolf refuses her offer to hire his army, stating he knows better than to battle against magic.

Sheera covertly drugs Sun Wolf and kidnaps him to a ship bound for Mandrigyn. Sheera's untrained magician Yirth poisons him with a deadly drug called "anzid", and he will die if he does not receive the daily spells which hold back its effects. Sun Wolf agrees to train a force of females Sheera has assembled in Mandrigyn so they can storm the mines and reclaim the men.

Discovering his absence, Starhawk suspects Sun Wolf has been taken to Altiokis's stronghold in Grimscarp. She deserts the company and embarks to find Sun Wolf, joined by Fawn, Sun Wolf's concubine. They meet the old wizard Anyog, who, like Yirth, has limited power because he never passed the final trial which would unlock his magic potential.

Starhawk and her companions encounter a group of zombie-like nuuwa, creatures whose minds have been destroyed by a magical parasite. During their battle, Fawn is badly injured, and they bring her to Anyog's home town to allow her time to heal. Fawn decides that she cannot live the life of a mercenary's lover and decides to marry Anyog's merchant nephew instead. Their conversation awakens Starhawk's true feelings for Sun Wolf. She realizes that she loves him and must continue her hunt, even if he is already dead.

In Mandrigyn, Sun Wolf begins training Sheera's group of women in secret, disguised as a slave of her wealthy household. The women initially resent his strict methods but grow stronger and deadlier as they practice at night in the secluded orangery on Sheera's estate. While interacting with the females in his new company, Sun Wolf's thoughts turn to Starhawk, and he admits to himself that he loves her and relies on her company.

Sun Wolf grows frustrated with his situation and escapes the city, choosing death by the poison in his body over the months ahead of him in Sheera's service. He takes shelter in the wilderness, preparing to die as the pain in his body escalates and the anzid takes effect. In his delirium, his spirit reaches out to Starhawk in a dream; he tells her that he is in Mandrigyn and he's dying. However, he survives the night and is found by Yirth's magic abilities. He returns to Mandrigyn and realizes that he has developed wizard-like powers. Meanwhile, Starhawk learns from Anyog that the final trial to awaken a wizard's latent power is anzid.

Sun Wolf is spotted by Dark Eagle, a former mercenary rival who now commands Altiokis's forces. Sun Wolf uses his powers to escape the nuuwa guarding him but is betrayed by a disgruntled member of his female force. Dark Eagle recaptures him and escorts him to Grimscarp to face Altiokis.

Starhawk arrives in Mandrigyn and joins with Sheera's forces. They decide to storm the mines to free the townsmen and then charge through to Grimscarp before Sun Wolf is killed.

Sun Wolf is interrogated by Altiokis, who shows him the true source of evil wizard's power is an interdimensional force he has captured in the bottom of his citadel. Fearing Sun Wolf's wizard-like powers, Altiokis locks him a room with a parasite that will transform him into a nuuwa, but Sun Wolf uses his military training to gouge out his eye before the magical creature can eat through to his brain.

Sheera's female force arrives with the male fighters freed from the mines. They battle Dark Eagle's men and the nuuwa commended by Altiokis's mind control, but Sun Wolf kills Altiokis and the nuuwa turn against Dark Eagle. Sun Wolf uses his magical powers to ignite explosive powder to expose the interdimensional force to sunlight and banish it from their world. Sun Wolf and Starhawk heal from battle and admit their love for each other. They decide to leave their mercenary life behind to seek out training for Sun Wolf's new abilities.

== Reception ==
Dave Langford reviewed The Ladies of Mandrigyn for White Dwarf #86 and stated that "Add unpleasant magical gimmicks and well-drawn characters, and the result is a ripping fantasy yarn."

== Reviews ==
- Review by Faren Miller (1984) in Locus, #279 April 1984
- Review by Richard Law (1984) in Fantasy Review, September 1984
- Review by C. J. Henderson (1984) in Whispers #21-22, December 1984
- Review by Ken Brown (1987) in Interzone, #19 Spring 1987
