= Barbara Hambly =

American novelist and screenwriter (born 1951)

- Hambly at Worldcon 2026
- Born: August 28, 1951 (age 75); San Diego, California, U.S.
- Education: University of California, Riverside
- Occupations: Novelist; short story author; screenwriter
- Writing career
- Pen name: Barbara Hamilton
- Genres: Science fiction, fantasy, horror, mystery, historical fiction
- Notable awards: Lord Ruthven Award (1996)
- Website: barbarahambly.com

Barbara Hambly (born August 28, 1951) is an American novelist and screenwriter within the genres of fantasy, science fiction, mystery, and historical fiction.

She is the author of the bestselling Benjamin January mystery series featuring a free man of color, a musician and physician, in New Orleans in the antebellum years. Other historical fiction by Hambly includes novels about Mary Todd Lincoln and Abigail Adams.

Her science fiction novels occur within an explicit multiverse, as well as within previously existing settings (notably as established by Star Trek and Star Wars).

== Early life and education ==
Hambly was born in San Diego, California and grew up in Montclair, California. Her parents, Everett Edward Hambly Jr. and Florence Elizabeth (Moraski) Hambly, are from Fall River, Massachusetts; and Scranton, Pennsylvania (respectively). She has an older sister, Mary Ann Sanders, and a younger brother, Everett Edward Hambly, III. In her early teens, after reading J. R. R. Tolkien's The Lord of the Rings, she affixed images of dragons to her bedroom door. She became interested in costumery from an early age, and has been a long-time participant in Society for Creative Anachronism activities. In the mid-1960s, the Hambly family spent a year in Australia.

Hambly has a Master's in Medieval History from the University of California, Riverside. She completed her degree in 1975 and spent a year in Bordeaux as part of her studies.

== Career ==
She chose work that allowed her time to write; all of her novels contain a biography paragraph with a litany of jobs: high school teacher, model, waitress, technical editor, all-night liquor store clerk, and Shotokan karate instructor. Her first published novel was The Time of the Dark (1982).

Hambly served as President of the Science Fiction and Fantasy Writers of America from 1994 to 1996. Her works have been nominated for many awards in the fantasy and horror fiction categories, winning a Locus Award for Best Horror Novel Those Who Hunt the Night (1989) (released in the UK as Immortal Blood) and the Lord Ruthven Award for fiction for its sequel, Traveling with the Dead (1996).

From 2006 to 2023, Hambly taught at Los Angeles Pierce College as an adjunct assistant professor in the history and humanities department. The Barbara Hambly Papers are archived at University of California, Riverside.

== Marriage and personal life ==
From 1998 to 2000 Hambly was married to George Alec Effinger, a science fiction writer, who died in 2002. She lives in Los Angeles. Hambly speaks freely of suffering from seasonal affective disorder, which was undiagnosed for some time.

== Themes within fantasy ==
Hambly's work has several themes. She has a penchant for unusual characters within the fantasy genre, such as the menopausal witch and reluctant scholar-lord in the Winterlands trilogy, or the philologist secret service agent in the vampire novels.

Her writing is filled with rich descriptions and characters whose actions bear consequences for both their lives and relationships, suffusing her series with a sense of loss and regret. Hambly's characters suffer the pain of frustrated aspirations to a degree that is uncommon in most fantasy novels.

Though using many standard clichés and plot devices of the fantasy genre, her works explore the ethical implications of the consequences of these devices, and what their effect is for the characters, were they real people. In avoiding the "...easy consolatory self-identification of genre fantasy" (p. 449) and refusing to let her work be guided more explicitly by conventions and the desires of her audience, Hambly may have missed out on more remunerative success and acclaim.

Although magic exists in many of her settings, it is not used as an easy solution but follows rules and takes energy from the wizards. In the Darwath, Windrose, and Sun-Cross stories, unusual settings are justified as alternate universes.

Hambly heavily researches her settings, either in person or through books, frequently drawing upon her degree in medieval history for background and depth.

== Bibliography ==
=== Benjamin January mysteries ===
This historical mystery series begins with A Free Man of Color (1997) and features Benjamin January, a brilliant, classically educated, free colored surgeon and musician living in New Orleans during the antebellum years of the 1830s. At the time, New Orleans had a large and prosperous population of free people of color. Born a slave, as his mother was enslaved, January was freed as a young child by his mother's lover, under the plaçage system. Provided with an excellent education, he gained fluency in several classical and modern languages, and was thoroughly versed in the whole of classical Western learning and arts. He studied medicine in Paris, where he trained as a surgeon. He returned to Louisiana to escape the memory of his late wife, a woman from North Africa. As a free black in Louisiana, he cannot find work as a surgeon. He earns a modest living by his exceptional talent as a musician.

1. A Free Man of Color (1997)
2. Fever Season (1998)
3. Graveyard Dust (1999)
4. Sold Down the River (2000)
5. Die upon a Kiss (2001)
6. Wet Grave (2002)
7. Days of the Dead (2003)
8. Dead Water (2004)
9. Dead and Buried (2010)
10. The Shirt on His Back (2011)
11. Ran Away (2011)
12. Good Man Friday (2013)
13. Crimson Angel (2014)
14. Drinking Gourd (2016)
15. Murder in July (2017)
16. Cold Bayou (2018)
17. Lady of Perdition (2019)
18. House of the Patriarch (2020)
19. Death and Hard Cider (Hardcover—June 7, 2022)
20. The Nubian's Curse (Hardcover—January 2, 2024)
21. Murder in the Trembling Lands (Hardcover—July 1, 2025)

==== Short stories ====
- "Libre" (2006, short story in Ellery Queen's Mystery Magazine, November 2006, Salute to New Orleans issue. Available on Hambly's website.)
- "There Shall Your Heart Be Also" (2007, short story in New Orleans Noir, ed. Julie Smith. Available on Hambly's website.)
- "A Time to Every Purpose Under Heaven" (2010, short story starring Rose and Dominique, and taking place while Benjamin is away (plot of The Shirt on His Back). Available on Hambly's website.)

=== Historical fiction ===
- Search the Seven Hills [originally The Quirinal Hill Affair] (1983)
- The Emancipator's Wife (2005; finalist for the Michael Shaara Prize for Excellence in a Civil War Novel, 2006)
- Patriot Hearts (2007)
- Homeland: A Novel (2009)

=== Abigail Adams Mysteries (written as Barbara Hamilton) ===
1. The Ninth Daughter (2009)
2. A Marked Man (2010)
3. Sup with the Devil (2011)

=== Sherlock Holmes short story pastiches ===
1. "The Adventure of the Antiquarian’s Niece" (2003, Shadows Over Baker Street, ed. Michael Reaves & John Pelan, narrated by Dr. Watson)
2. "The Dollmaker of Marigold Walk" (2003, My Sherlock Holmes, ed. Michael Kurland, narrated by Mrs. Mary Watson)
3. "The Lost Boy" (2008, Gaslight Grimoire, ed. J. R. Campbell and Charles Prepolec, narrated by Mrs. Mary Watson)
4. "The Adventure of the Sinister Chinaman" (2010, Sherlock Holmes: Crossovers Casebook, ed. Howard Hopkins, narrated by Dr. Watson)

=== Anne Steelyard: The Garden of Emptiness ===
1. An Honorary Man (2008, graphic novel)
2. The Gate of Dreams and Starlight (2009, graphic novel)
3. A Thousand Waters (2011, graphic novel)

=== Darwath ===
1. The Time of the Dark (1982)
2. The Walls of Air (1983)
3. The Armies of Daylight (1983)
4. Mother of Winter (1996; Locus Award nominee 1997)
5. Icefalcon's Quest (1998)
6. "Pretty Polly" (2010, original short story available on Hambly's website.)
7. "Elsewhere" (2017, Amazon/Kindle)
8. "The Dreamers of Black Rock" (2018, Amazon/Kindle)

=== Sun Wolf and Starhawk ===
1. The Ladies of Mandrigyn (1984; Locus Award nominee, 1985)
2. The Witches of Wenshar (1987; Locus Award nominee, 1988)
3. The Unschooled Wizard (The Ladies of Mandrigyn & The Witches of Wenshar omnibus; 1987)
4. The Dark Hand of Magic (1990)
5. "A Night with the Girls" (2010, an original short story available on Hambly's website)
6. "Fairest in ihe Land" (2011, an original short story available on Hambly's website)
7. "Nanya of the Butterflies" (2015)
8. "Hazard" (2017)
9. "Gwenael" (2018)

=== Winterlands ===
1. Dragonsbane (1985; Locus Award nominee, 1986 and 1987)
2. Dragonshadow (1999; Locus Award nominee, 2000)
3. Knight of the Demon Queen (2000; Locus Award nominee, 2001)
4. Dragonstar (2002)
5. Princess (2010, novella starring John Aversin. Now available on Hambly's website.)
6. Shadowbaby (2013, novelette published on Amazon/Kindle)
7. "Damselblossom" [or "Damsel Blossom"; the title appears both ways in the front matter] (2015, novelette published on Amazon/Kindle)
8. "Hag in the Water" (2017, novelette published on Amazon/Kindle)
9. "Cat's Paw" (2024, novelette published on Amazon/Kindle)

=== The Windrose Chronicles ===
1. The Silent Tower (1986)
2. The Silicon Mage (1988)
3. Darkmage (1988, omnibus of The Silent Tower and The Silicon Mage)
4. Dog Wizard (1993; Locus Award nominee, 1994)
5. Stranger at the Wedding (also published as Sorcerer's Ward; 1994)—not the same main characters, but set in the same universe
6. "Firemaggot" (2010, an original short story available on Smashwords)
7. "Corridor" (2011, an original short story available on Smashwords)
8. "Plus-One" (2012, an original short story available on Smashwords)
9. "Personal Paradise" (2014, an original short story available on Smashwords)
10. "Zénobie" (July 2015, an original short story available on Smashwords)
11. "...Pretty Maids All in a Row" (October 2015)
12. "Karate Masters vs the Invaders from Outer Space" (December 2017)
13. "Just Like Real People" (October 2019)
14. "Temporary Quarters" (2024, Amazon/Kindle)

=== Star Trek Universe ===
1. Ishmael (1985)
2. Ghost-Walker (1991)
3. Crossroad (1994)

=== James Asher, Vampire novels ===
1. Those Who Hunt the Night, AKA Immortal Blood (UK title) (1988; Locus Award winner for Best Horror Novel in 1989)
2. Traveling with the Dead (1995; Locus Award nominee, 1996, winner of the Lord Ruthven Award, 1996)
3. Blood Maidens (2010)
4. Magistrates of Hell (2012)
5. The Kindred of Darkness (U.K. 2013, U.S. 2014)
6. Darkness on His Bones (2015)
7. Pale Guardian (U.K. 2016, U.S. 2017)
8. Prisoner of Midnight (U.S. 2019)

The short story "Gravemould and Ectoplasm" (2019, Amazon/Kindle) is a sequel to Prisoner of Midnight.

The short story "Sunrise on Running Water" (2007, published in the anthology Dark Delicacies II: Fear) is set in the world of the James Asher novels but does not feature Asher himself.

=== Beauty and the Beast ===
1. Beauty and the Beast novelization (1989)
2. Song of Orpheus (1990)

=== Sun-Cross ===
1. The Rainbow Abyss (1991; Locus Award nominee, 1992)
2. The Magicians of Night (1992; Locus Award nominee, 1993)

=== Star Wars universe ===
- Children of the Jedi (1995)
- "Nightlily: The Lovers' Tale" (1995, short story in the anthology Tales from the Mos Eisley Cantina)
- "Taster's Choice: The Tale of Jabba's Chef" (1996, short story from the anthology Tales from Jabba's Palace)
- "Murder in Slushtime" (1997, short story published in Star Wars Adventure Journal 14)
- Planet of Twilight (1997)

=== Raven Sisters ===
- Sisters of the Raven (2002)
- Circle of the Moon (2005)

=== Silver Screen historical mystery series ===
- Scandal in Babylon (2021). Not exactly a sequel to Bride of the Rat God, which was a supernatural fantasy. Hambly decided that the same characters, with the same names and mostly the same backstories, would work well in a mystery, eventually a series, without supernatural elements.
- One Extra Corpse (2023)
- Saving Susy Sweetchild (2024)
- Death in the Palace (2026)

=== Standalone works ===
- Bride of the Rat God (1994; Locus Award nominee, 1995) and (sequel) Castle of Horror (April 2016, Amazon/Kindle)
- Magic Time (2002) (with Marc Zicree. The first of a trilogy. The other two volumes are by other authors: Angelfire by Marc Scott Zicree and Maya Kaathryn Bohnhoff, and Ghostlands by Marc Scott Zicree and Robert Charles Wilson.)
- Renfield: Slave of Dracula (2006)
- "Someone Else's Shadow" (short story in the Night's Edge anthology)
- The Iron Princess (2023)

== Television credits ==
- Jayce and the Wheeled Warriors (1985)
- M.A.S.K. (1985)
- She-Ra: Princess of Power (1986)
- The Centurions (1986)
- Starcom: The U.S. Space Force (1987)
