= Maurizio De Giovanni =

Italian author of mystery novels (born 1958)

Maurizio de Giovanni (born March 31, 1958, in Naples) is an Italian author of mystery novels.

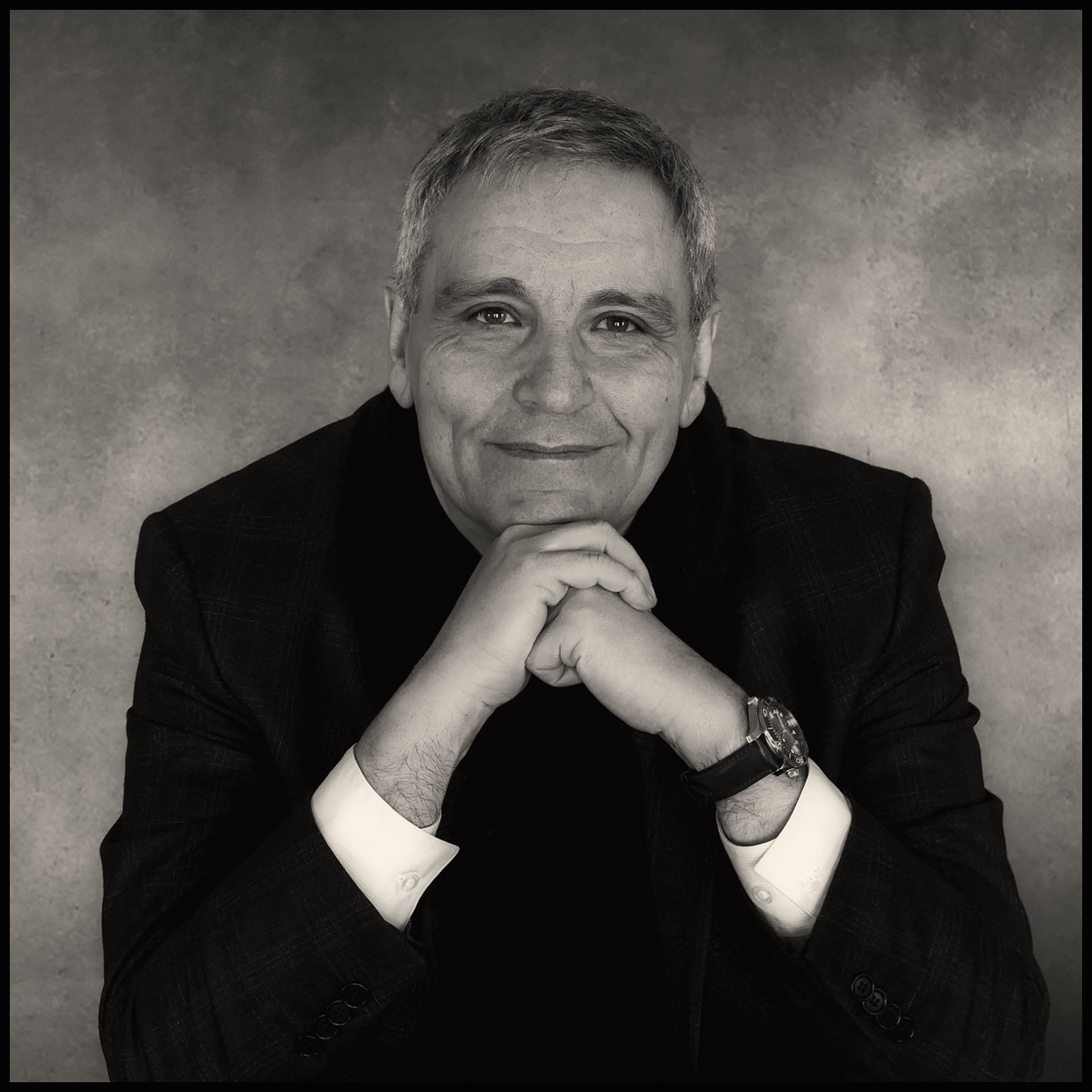
Maurizio de Giovanni photographed by Augusto De Luca

== Biography ==
Maurizio de Giovanni was born in Naples in 1958; he has spent the majority of his life living and working there. In 2005 he decided to join a Porsche Italia competition reserved for giallo novelists, and that's where he came up with the character of Commissario Ricciardi, main protagonist of his first short story, “I vivi e I morti”. This was the start of his career as a writer. Subsequently, I Vivi e i morti served as an inspiration for Le lacrime del pagliaccio (reissued as Il senso del dolore (2007), later translated as I will have vengeance – The winter of commissario Ricciardi), whose detective Ricciardi then became the protagonist for a series of very popular murder novels.

Following this, in 2008, Blood curse – The springtime of commissario Ricciardi was released. In 2009 came Everyone in their place – The summer of commissario Ricciardi and finally, in 2010, The day of the dead – The autumn of commissario Ricciardi was released. He started to gain a wider audience and made a name for himself because of this series.

In 2011 he had his first book published by Einaudi, By my hand – A commissario Ricciardi mystery.

In 2012 de Giovanni wrote in the noir genre with a book titled The Crocodile (Il metodo del coccodrillo), introducing a new main character, Ispettore Lojacono.

In the same year, together with Einaudi, he published the pocket version of the seasons’ novels and the brand new Viper – A commissario Ricciardi mystery.

In 2013 The Bastards of Pizzofalcone (I Bastardi di Pizzofalcone) was released. The book was inspired by the 87th Precinct novels from author Ed McBain, and marked De Giovanni's transition from the noir genre to the police procedural. Soon after, he published Darkness for the Bastards of Pizzofalcone (Buio per i Bastardi di Pizzofalcone), the second entry in what would become the 'Pizzofalcone' novels. In 2017, The Bastards of Pizzofalcone was adapted as a televisions series of the same name for Rai 1.

In the same month as Darkness was completed, his short story Un giorno di Settembre a Natale, contained in the anthology Regalo di Natale, was published by the editor Sellerio.

2014 was a prolific year for de Giovanni. Not only were 15 of his noir stories released in the Mani insanguinate anthology, he also had two new novels published: Bottom of your heart (by Einaudi) and Gelo per i bastardi di Pizzofalcone.

In 2015, Glass souls, the 8th installment in the Ricciardi's series, was released. In the same year, he appeared at an event at the Italian Cultural Institute in Edinburgh, in conversation with academic Raffaella Ocone discussing the success of the detective story.

In 2016, de Giovanni had both Serenata senza nome. Notturno per il commissario Ricciardi and Pane per i Bastardi di Pizzofalcone published.

The majority of his works are currently translated into the following languages: English, Spanish, Catalan, French and German.

He's an atheist.

== Works ==
=== Commissario Ricciardi series ===
- 2006 – Le lacrime del pagliaccio, Graus Editore; re-published in 2007, by Fandango, as Il senso del dolore: l'inverno del commissario Ricciardi.
  - 2012 – I Will Have Vengeance: The Winter of Commissario Ricciardi, Europa World Noir. Translated from the Italian by Anne Milano Appel.
- 2008 – La condanna del sangue: la primavera del commissario Ricciardi, Fandango
  - 2013 – Blood Curse: The Springtime of Commissario Ricciardi, Europa World Noir. Translated from the Italian by Antony Shugaar
- 2009 – Il posto di ognuno: l'estate del commissario Ricciardi, Fandango
  - 2013 – Everyone in Their Place: The Summer of Commissario Ricciardi, Europa World Noir. Translated from the Italian by Antony Shugaar
- 2010 – Il giorno dei morti: l'autunno del commissario Ricciardi, Fandango
  - 2014 – The Day of the Dead: The Autumn of Commissario Ricciardi, Europa World Noir. Translated from the Italian by Antony Shugaar
- 2011 – Per mano mia: il Natale del commissario Ricciardi, Einaudi
  - 2014 – By My Hand: The Christmas of Commissario Ricciardi, Europa World Noir. Translated from the Italian by Antony Shugaar
- 2012 – L'omicidio Carosino: le prime indagini del commissario Ricciardi, Cento Autori
- 2012 – Vipera: nessuna resurrezione per il commissario Ricciardi, Einaudi
  - 2015 – Viper: No Resurrection for Commissario Ricciardi, Europa World Noir. Translated from the Italian by Antony Shugaar
- 2014 – "Febbre" (short story contained in the anthology Giochi criminali), Einaudi
- 2014 – In fondo al tuo cuore: inferno per il commissario Ricciardi, Einaudi
  - 2015 – The Bottom of Your Heart: Inferno for Commissario Ricciardi, Europa World Noir. Translated from the Italian by Antony Shugaar
- 2015 – Anime di vetro: falene per il commissario Ricciardi, Einaudi
  - 2017 – Glass Souls: Moths for Commissario Ricciardi, Europa World Noir. Translated from the Italian by Antony Shugaar
- 2016 – Serenata senza nome. Notturno per il commissario Ricciardi, Einaudi
  - 2018 – Nameless Serenade: Nocturne for Commissario Ricciardi, Europa World Noir. Translated from the Italian by Antony Shugaar
- 2017 – Rondini d'inverno: sipario per il commissario Ricciardi, Einaudi
  - 2023 – Winter Swallows: Ring Down the Curtains for Commissario Ricciardi, Europa World Noir. Translated from the Italian by Antony Shugaar
- 2018 – Il purgatorio dell'angelo: confessioni per il commissario Ricciardi, Einaudi
- 2019 - Il pianto dell'alba: Ultima ombra per il commissario Ricciardi, Einaudi
- 2022 - Caminito: Un aprile del commissario Ricciardi, Einaudi
- 2023 - Soledad. Un dicembre del commissario Ricciardi, Einaudi
- 2024 - Volver. Ritorno per il commissario Ricciardi, Einaudi

=== The Bastards of Pizzofalcone series ===
- 2012 – Il metodo del coccodrillo, Mondadori
  - 2013 – The Crocodile, Europa World Noir. Translated from the Italian by Antony Shugaar
- 2013 – I Bastardi di Pizzofalcone, Einaudi
  - 2016 – The Bastards of Pizzofalcone, Europa World Noir. Translated from the Italian by Antony Shugaar
- 2013 – Buio per i Bastardi di Pizzofalcone, Einaudi
  - 2016 – Darkness for the Bastards of Pizzofalcone, Europa World Noir. Translated from the Italian by Antony Shugaar
- 2014 – Gelo per i Bastardi di Pizzofalcone, Einaudi
  - 2019 – Cold for the Bastards of Pizzofalcone, Europa World Noir. Translated from the Italian by Antony Shugaar
- 2015 – Cuccioli per i Bastardi di Pizzofalcone, Einaudi
  - 2020 – Puppies: A Bastards of Pizzofalcone Book, Europa World Noir. Translated from the Italian by Antony Shugaar
- 2016 – Pane per i Bastardi di Pizzofalcone, Einaudi
  - 2022 – Bread for the Bastards of Pizzofalcone, Europa World Noir. Translated from the Italian by Antony Shugaar
- 2017 – Souvenir per i Bastardi di Pizzofalcone, Einaudi
- 2018 – Vuoto per i Bastardi di Pizzofalcone, Einaudi
- 2019 – Nozze per i Bastardi di Pizzofalcone, Einaudi
- 2020 – Fiori per i Bastardi di Pizzofalcone, Einaudi
- 2021 – Angeli per i Bastardi di Pizzofalcone, Einaudi

=== Articles and short stories about sports ===
- 2008 – Juve-Napoli 1–3: la presa di Torino, Cento Autori
- 2009 – Ti racconto il 10 maggio, Cento Autori
- 2010 – Miracolo a Torino: Juve Napoli 2–3, Cento Autori
- 2010 – Storie azzurre, Cento Autori (anthology)
- 2010 – "Maradona è meglio 'e Pelé" (short article contained in Per segnare bisogna tirare in porta, Spartaco)
- 2014 – La partita di pallone: storie di calcio, Sellerio editore (anthology)
- 2015 – Il resto della settimana, Rizzoli

=== Miscellaneous ===
- 2005 – Il maschio dominante, Graus & Boniello
- 2007 – Le beffe della cena ovvero piccolo manuale dell'intrattenimento in piedi, Kairòs
- 2010 – L'ombra nello specchio, Kairòs
- 2010 – Mammarella, Cagliostro ePress
- 2011 – "Scusi, un ricordo del terremoto dell'ottanta?" (short story contained in the anthology Trema la terra, Neo edizioni e Una lunga notte, Cento Autori)
- 2012 – Gli altri fantasmi, Spartaco
- 2012 – Respirando in discesa, Senza Patria
- 2012 – Per amore di Nami, Zefiro
- 2013 – Gli altri, Tunué (comic book derived from Gli altri fantasmi)
- 2013 – "Un giorno di Settembre a Natale" (short story contained in the anthology Regalo di Natale, Sellerio)
- 2013 – "Il tappo del 128" (short story contained in the anthology Racconti in sala d'attesa, Caracò)
- 2014 – Le mani insanguinate, Cento Autori (anthology)
- 2014 – Verità imperfette, Del Vecchio Editore (co-written with other authors)
- 2015 – "Ti voglio bene" in Roberto Colonna (editor), Il fantastico. Tradizioni a confronto, Salerno, Edizioni Arcoiris, 2014
- 2015 – "Istantanee" in Maurizio de Giovanni (editor) Nessuno ci ridurrà al silenzio, Cento Autori (anthology)
- 2015 – Una mano sul volto, Ad est dell'equatore (contained in an anthology against the violence on women)
- 2015 – La solitudine dell'anima, Cento Autori (anthology) ISBN 978-88-6872-036-0, a secret short story about a young Ricciardi is contained in this anthology.
- 2017 – Vita quotidiana dei Bastardi di Pizzofalcone, Einaudi, ISBN 978-8806233938, to accompany the release of the television series I bastardi di Pizzofalcone, de Giovanni gives voice to the characters of the investigative team.

== Theatre ==
=== Adaptation ===
- 2015 – Qualcuno volò sul nido del cuculo, directed by Alessandro Gassmann

== Television ==
=== Scriptwriter ===
- 2017 – The Bastards of Pizzofalcone, TV crime drama directed by Carlo Carlei.
- 2021 – Inspector Ricciardi, TV crime drama directed by Alessandro D'Alatri and Gianpaolo Tescari
- 2021 – Mina Settembre, TV drama directed by Tiziana Aristarco
- 2023 – Resta con me, TV miniseries directed by Monica Vullo.
- 2025 – Sara: Woman in the Shadows, TV crime drama directed by Carmine Elia

=== Host ===
- 2023 – La biblioteca dei sentimenti, Television programme
