= Benjamin January mysteries =

Series of historical murder mystery novels by Barbara Hambly

Benjamin January
- First appearance: A Free Man of Color
- Created by: Barbara Hambly

In-universe information
- Gender: Male
- Occupation: Musician, teacher, physician
- Family: Livia Janvier Levesque (mother); Olympe "Olympia Snakebones" Corbier (sister); Dominique "Minou" Janvier (half-sister)
- Spouse: Rose Vitrac
- Nationality: American

The Benjamin January mysteries are a series of historical murder mystery novels by Barbara Hambly. January, the main character of the books, is an African American surgeon, pianist, teacher and amateur sleuth.

The books are set in and around New Orleans during the 1830s and 1840s, and focus primarily on the free black community which existed at that time and place. The first book, A Free Man of Color, was published in 1997, and the series is still on-going. The first eight books in the series were published by Bantam Press, the subsequent ten were published by Severn House Publishers. The second book in the series, Fever Season, was named a New York Times Notable Mystery Book of 1998. Seven books in the series (Fever Season, Dead Water, The Shirt on His Back, Ran Away, Good Man Friday, Crimson Angel, and Drinking Gourd) have received starred reviews from Publishers Weekly.

== Major recurring characters ==
Benjamin January
Former slave, freed as a child by his placée mother's lover. He trained in Paris as a surgeon, but works primarily as a piano player and teacher. He is very tall, and very dark-skinned, which is a significant impediment to his medical career in pre-Civil War New Orleans. He lived in France for many years, but returned to New Orleans when his first wife, Ayasha, an Algerian woman, died of cholera.

Rose Vitrac
The mixed-race daughter of a placée, whose mother had raised her to become a placée in turn. But Rose was more interested in learning, particularly natural sciences, and eventually managed to secure an education and establish herself as a schoolteacher, in order to assist other free colored girls. She is close friends with both Benjamin and Hannibal, and eventually marries Benjamin.

Hannibal Sefton
Benjamin's friend and fellow musician (a violin player). He is Anglo-Irish, was educated at Oxford and plays a "hundred guinea violin" ("Graveyard Dust"). In Dead and Buried, it is revealed that Hannibal's birth name is Alexander Stuart, and that he could, if he wanted, lay claim to the Foxford estate, as Viscount (or Lord, both titles appear in the book) Foxford, the title currently belonging to his son, Germanicus ("Gerry") Stuart, Lord Foxford. Alec (Hannibal) had faked his death in Paris and moved to New Orleans, stating that his wife, Philippa, would be "a better custodian of Foxford Priory than an opium-swilling fiddle player". Since faking his death, Hannibal has lived in poverty. He has tuberculosis, and is addicted to alcohol and laudanum, though he eventually manages to break both habits. Hannibal is one of the few white people willing to socialize with people of color. The formal white society of Americans is more segregated than that of creole French.

Dominique "Minou" Janvier
Benjamin's younger mixed-race half-sister, the daughter of his mother and her white protector. Dominique is the placée of a wealthy white gentleman, Henri, with whom she has a daughter, Charmian.

Olympe "Olympia Snakebones" Corbier
Benjamin's younger sister (older than Dominique). She is a locally prominent Voodoo practitioner, as well as a wife and mother. Both she and Benjamin were fathered by a slave before their mother became a placée. She was freed at the same time as her mother and brother. Her oldest children, ZiZi-Marie and Gabrielle are also recurring characters.

Livia Janvier Levesque
The mother of Benjamin, Olympe, and Dominique. She is a former placée, and now a minor land owner. She is half-white, and extremely status-conscious. She was born a slave. Her placée protector paid for her freedom and that of her children.

Lieutenant Abishag Shaw
A white policeman, originally from Kentucky, who is significantly smarter and better educated than he pretends to be. Unlike many of the other policemen, Shaw is interested in true justice and has often proved sympathetic to Benjamin's concerns. He does not appear to support the institution of slavery, though he obeys the customs of black-white interactions, at least in public.

Henri Viellard
Dominique's protector and the father of her two children: Charles-Henri (deceased) and Charmian.

Chloe Viellard (née St. Chinian)
Henri's fiancée, later his wife; a young heiress who controls her own property. Chloe likes Dominique and accepts her place with Henri, feeling that they both have a role in his life.

Augustus Mayerling
Fencing master, introduced in the first book, a woman passing as a man. She marries Madeleine (Dubonnet) Trepagier at the end of the book "by Protestant ceremony."

Madeleine (Dubonnet) Trepagier Mayerling
Former student of Benjamin's, abused by her late husband, Arnaud Trepagier. Marries Augustus Mayerling at the end of the first book. Both characters recur throughout the series.

== Works in the series ==
The Benjamin January mysteries series consists of nineteen novels and five short stories to date.

=== Novels ===
1. A Free Man of Color (1997)
2. Fever Season (1998)
3. Graveyard Dust (1999)
4. Sold Down the River (2000)
5. Die upon a Kiss (2001)
6. Wet Grave (2002)
7. Days of the Dead (2003)
8. Dead Water (2004)
9. Dead and Buried (2010)
10. The Shirt on His Back (2011)
11. Ran Away (2011)
12. Good Man Friday (2013)
13. Crimson Angel (UK August 2014, US December 2014)
14. Drinking Gourd (UK and US February 2016)
15. Murder in July (UK August 2017, US December 2017)
16. Cold Bayou (UK May 2018, US September 2018)
17. Lady of Perdition (UK September 2019, US January 2020)
18. House of the Patriarch (UK October 2020, US January 2021)
19. Death and Hard Cider (UK March 2022, US June 2022)
20. The Nubian's Curse (January 2024)
21. Murder in the Trembling Lands (Hardcover - July 1, 2025)

=== Short stories ===
- "Libre" (2006, published in Ellery Queen’s Mystery Magazine, November 2006, Salute to New Orleans issue): Benjamin solves a mystery relating to the disappearance of a placée's daughter, who was shortly to have become a placée herself. Hannibal and Dominique assist.
- "There Shall Your Heart Be Also" (2007, published in New Orleans Noir): Benjamin and Hannibal are asked to help when a stranger attempts to steal Kentucky Williams' bible.
- "A Time to Every Purpose Under Heaven" (2010, self-published): Rose, with the help of Dominique, solves the murder of a neighbor while Benjamin is away during The Shirt on His Back.
- "Hagar" (2015, self-published): While attending a costume party, Rose witnesses the murder of a plantation owner's wife. She attempts to protect the maid accused of the crime by finding the real murderer. Hannibal, Livia, and Shaw assist. Set during Good Man Friday.
- "Death on the Moon" (2016, self-published): A con-artist comes to New Orleans, claiming he can show aliens living on the moon through the use of a special telescope. When one of the "aliens" is murdered, Rose sets out to find the real victim with the help of Hannibal. Set between Days of the Dead and Dead Water.

All the short stories are available for download on Hambly's website.

== Book synopses ==
A Free Man of Color
Newly arrived in New Orleans after spending most of his adult life in Paris, Benjamin is accused of the murder of a placée named Angelique as he is the last known person to see her alive. Benjamin struggles to find the real killer before he is jailed and executed for the murder. He also tries to help the widow of Angelique's former protector, a white woman who may have had her own reasons for wanting Angelique dead.

Fever Season
During a cholera and yellow fever epidemic, Benjamin deals with a runaway slave girl, Cora, who is wanted for poisoning her master, Otis Redfern. He also meets Rose, the head-mistress of a school for free colored girls, when he helps to treat several of the students who have yellow fever. The kidnapping of free blacks to sell them as slaves forms a major subplot to the novel. Delphine LaLaurie is central to the novel's climax.

Graveyard Dust
Benjamin's sister Olympe is accused of murder and Benjamin must find the real killer in order to prevent her execution. Olympe's role as a voodoo practitioner is used against her to raise suspicion, and voodoo plays an important part in the mystery. Marie Laveau is an important secondary character.

Sold Down the River
The white planter who formerly owned Benjamin and his family asks Benjamin to determine the source of a series of violent incidents on his plantation. Benjamin agrees, but must go undercover as a slave, taking along Hannibal to serve as his master. The ruse places Benjamin in a great deal of danger, as well as bringing back unwelcome memories of his childhood as a slave.

Die upon a Kiss
An opera troupe, composed mostly of Italians, arrives in New Orleans. Benjamin and Hannibal are hired to play in the orchestra. However, after the director and several other members of the troupe are attacked, Benjamin investigates the cause, which he suspects is related to an attempt to censor the production of an operatic version of Othello, due to racist anger over the central black/white romance. In a subplot, Dominique finds herself pregnant and struggles with the decision to keep the child. The smuggling of slaves from Cuba and Africa into America, despite the 1808 Act Prohibiting Importation of Slaves, is another important plot thread.

Wet Grave
The aging former placée of a pirate is killed under mysterious circumstances. Benjamin and Rose find themselves caught up in the workings of someone else's plot, on the run in the bayous and marshes. Historical events involving pirates, including Jean Lafitte, are relevant to the plot, as well as slave rebellions, leprosy, and hurricanes. Henri and Chloe marry, putting Henri and Dominique's relationship in peril. Benjamin and Rose marry at the end of the book.

Days of the Dead
In Mexico City, Hannibal has been accused of poisoning the son of a prominent local landowner. Benjamin and Rose, at his request, come to find the true murderer amid a complicated tangle of relationships and suspects, and to rescue Hannibal both from execution and from captivity by a rich madman. Santa Anna plays a minor role in the plot.

Dead Water
A great deal of money has been embezzled from the bank where Benjamin and Rose keep their money. To prevent the bank's collapse, and thus save Rose's school for colored girls, Benjamin, Rose, and Hannibal follow the embezzler onto a steamboat to recover the stolen money. The embezzler's murder complicates matters greatly. The Underground Railroad appears for the first time in the series, and Benjamin agrees to join, offering his home as a safe house. This will form a background detail in many of the subsequent novels. Jefferson Davis, future president of the Confederacy, plays a role as one of the other passengers on the steamboat.

Dead and Buried
At a friend's funeral, Benjamin discovers a different body in the coffin— that of a white man that Hannibal recognizes. Hannibal's history, which he has long kept a secret, proves relevant to the mystery. The issue of 'passing' plays an important part in the novel.

The Shirt on His Back
Lieutenant Shaw's younger brother was murdered while working in a fur trading company in the Rocky Mountains. Shaw, Benjamin, and a newly-sober Hannibal travel to a trade rendezvous to find the killer. At the end of the book, Rose gives birth to Benjamin's first child, John.

Ran Away
A former Turkish ambassador moves to New Orleans, but is the first suspect when two of his concubines are murdered. Nearly half the book takes place in a flashback to Paris, 1827, where Benjamin had previously met the Turk. Benjamin's relationship with his first wife, Ayasha, is described in greater detail.

Good Man Friday
A friend of Chloe and Henri Viellard disappears while traveling in Washington DC. Chloe, Henri, Dominique, and Benjamin go to the capital to investigate, becoming involved in subplots with early baseball, slave-stealers, mathematical codes, and Edgar Allan Poe.

Crimson Angel
Rose's white half-brother is murdered in a plot to recover the Vitrac family's long-lost treasure (as well as secrets hidden with the money) from their former sugar plantation on Haiti. After an attempt on Rose's life, she and Benjamin retreat to the countryside of southern Louisiana. When the killers follow them there, Rose, Benjamin, and Hannibal head to Cuba to investigate before eventually reaching Haiti itself.

Drinking Gourd
Benjamin and Hannibal take summer jobs working for a traveling minstrel show, which brings them to Vicksburg, Mississippi. While there, Benjamin's connections on the Underground Railroad call on his aid both as a doctor and a detective. An important organizer has been accused of murder, and it is up to Benjamin to prove his innocence without revealing the secrets of the Underground Railroad.

Murder in July
When an Englishman is found dead in New Orleans, the British consul – who met Benjamin during his visit to Washington, D.C. – offers Benjamin a reward to solve the case. Benjamin is at first reluctant to get involved, but as matters complicate, he realizes that this murder is connected to another one he investigated in 1832 in Paris, during the June Rebellion. The book alternates between the two time periods, allowing Ayasha and other characters from Ran Away to reappear. Hannibal is revealed to have knowledge about both cases.

Cold Bayou
A friend of Benjamin and Rose, the elderly Veryl St-Chinian, has engaged himself to an eighteen-year-old illiterate former prostitute. The rich St-Chinian family is outraged at the thought of the upcoming marriage, particularly as it would give the bride financial control of the family's vast holdings. When the bride's maid is murdered in what may have been an attempt on the bride's life, Benjamin sets out to investigate. The stakes are raised when it's revealed that the bride holds the papers to a long-ago debt from Simon Fourchet, Benjamin's former owner, meaning Ben, his mother, siblings, and children may all still be legally slaves.

== Analysis ==
The series, beginning with A Free Man of Color, follows Benjamin January, a brilliant, classically educated free colored surgeon and musician living in New Orleans during the Belle Époque of the 1830s, when New Orleans had a large and prosperous free colored demimonde. January was born a slave but freed as a young child and provided with an excellent education; he is fluent in several classical and modern languages and thoroughly versed in the whole of classical Western learning and arts. Although trained in Paris as a surgeon, he has returned to Louisiana to escape the memory of his dead Parisian wife. As he is a very dark-skinned black man, he cannot find work as a surgeon in Louisiana. Instead, he earns a modest living as a musician.

Each title is an entertaining murder mystery with a complex plot and well-developed characters, and each explores many aspects of Creole society. However, most tend to emphasize some particular element of antebellum Louisiana life, such as Voodoo religion (Graveyard Dust), opera and music (Die Upon a Kiss), the annual epidemics of yellow fever and malaria (Fever Season), fear of miscegenation (Dead and Buried), or the harsh nature of commercial sugar production (Sold Down the River).

Important themes running throughout the series are 1) the cultural clash between the rising Protestant English-speaking Anglo-Americans on the one hand and the declining Catholic, French-speaking Creoles on the other, 2) the extreme regard of Creole society for "how" colored a person is (quite alien to modern readers), 3) January's bitterness at the many forms of racial injustice he observes, 4) the complex, partially race-based sexual politics of colonial French society, and 5) January's ongoing attempts to balance the primal, open, and frank African outlook acquired in his early childhood with the more restrained and rational European worldview he now holds. This last theme occurs most often with respect to music, spirituality, and respect for law and social custom.
